= 2026 Major League Rugby season =

Ninth season of Major League Rugby

- Countries: United States (6 teams)
- Date: March 29 – June 21, 2026
- Champions: Chicago Hounds (1st title)
- Runners-up: California Legion
- Matches played: 33
- Tries scored: 282 (average 8.5 per match)

The 2026 Major League Rugby season was the ninth season of Major League Rugby (MLR), the professional rugby union competition sanctioned by USA Rugby. The regular season began on March 28, with the season being concluded on June 21 in the MLR Championship Final. The 2026 season featured six teams, a downsizing from the previous season, the lowest in the league's history.

For the second time, the MLR Championship Final was played at SeatGeek Stadium in Bridgeview, Illinois.

== Records, milestones, and notable statistics ==
Preseason

- Major League Rugby and the United States Rugby Players Association (USRPA) signed the first-ever collective bargaining agreement in American rugby history.
- The Seattle Seawolves played the Stormers XXIII at Cape Town Stadium on March 22, the first international friendly match in the club's history. The Seawolves lost 45–14.

Week 1

- Anthem RC earns the first victory in franchise history, defeating the California Legion 39–26 and ending a 32-game losing streak.

Week 2

- Chicago flanker Maclean Jones becomes the first player with 50 appearances in franchise history.
- The California Legion pick up their first win in franchise history, defeating the reigning MLR Champion New England Free Jacks 43–5. The 38-point deficit is also the largest margin of defeat in Free Jacks' history.
- Jason Robertson (DC) scores 11 points to move to the fourth highest all-time scorer in MLR history, surpassing Sam Malcom.
- Davy Coetzer (SEA) scores 18 points to move to the fifth highest all-time scorer in MLR history, surpassing Sam Malcolm and Mack Mason.

Week 3

- Anthem RC defeats the Seattle Seawolves, 34–25, at American Legion Memorial Stadium, the first home victory in franchise history.
- Johan Momsen (ARC) becomes the third player in MLR history with 1,000 tackles completed in league play.
- In the first-ever broadcast of Sunday Night Rugby, the Chicago Hounds defeat the California Legion, 48–24. The Hounds move to 2–0–0 to start the season for the first time in franchise history.
- Joe Mano (CAL) becomes the fourth player in MLR history with 40 career tries scored.

Week 4

- Luke White (CHI) becomes the fifth player in MLR history to appear in 100 games.
- The game between Old Glory DC and Anthem RC featured an MLR-record five 1st Overall MLR Draft Picks: Conner Mooneyham (2020), Sam Golla (2022), Erich Storti (2024), and Will Sherman (2025) for Anthem, and Rick Rose (2023) for DC. The previous record of four was set in 2025 between Anthem RC and the Miami Sharks, and featured Mooneyham, Golla, Storti, and Rose.
- Davy Goetzer (SEA) scores 19 points, becoming the fourth player in MLR history to surpass 400 points scored.

Week 5

- The Chicago Hounds defeated the Seattle Seawolves 59–22, the first win over Seattle in franchise history. The Hounds also tied franchise records for points and tries (9) in a game, and set a new franchise record for largest margin of victory (37 points), while Seattle broke a franchise record for most points conceded in a game.
- Mark O'Keeffe (CHI) becomes the sixth player in MLR history to surpass 5,000 meters gained in a career.
- Christopher Hilsenbeck (CHI) becomes the highest-scoring player in franchise history with 137 career points for the Hounds.
- Emmanuel Albert (CHI) becomes the second MLR draftee to surpass 500 career tackles.
- Bailey Wilson (NE) becomes the fourth player in MLR history to surpass 800 career tackles.

Week 6

- The Seattle Seawolves win their 73rd game all-time, surpassing the San Diego Legion as the winningest club in MLR history.
- Riekert Hattingh (SEA) becomes the first forward to score a conversion kick in MLR history.
- Christopher Hilsenbeck (CHI) scores 17 points, tying the club's single-game scoring record.
- Jason Robertson (DC) scores 14 points to move to 412 career points, the fifth player to surpass 400 points scored.

Week 7

- The New England Free Jacks defeat the California Legion in the 100th match in Free Jacks' history. The Free Jacks are the first non-founding team in MLR history, and just the sixth overall, to reach the 100-game milestone.
- Riekert Hattingh (SEA) becomes the sixth player in MLR history to appear in 100 games, and the fourth to surpass 1,000 career tackles.
- The Chicago Hounds set a franchise record for points scored in a game in a 61–36 victory over Anthem RC. The combined 97 points also makes it the highest scoring game in both teams' histories, and the fourth highest scoring game in MLR history.

Week 8

- The Chicago Hounds win a franchise-record seventh straight game, clinching their third straight playoff berth.

Week 9

- Jake Turnbull (CHI) becomes the seventh player in MLR history to appear in 100 games.
- Tevita Naqali (DC) makes his 77th appearance for the Flags, surpassing Jack Iscaro for most appearances in franchise history.
- Jake Turnbull and Nathan Den Hoedt (CHI) both surpass 700 career tackles.
- Cory Daniel (DC) becomes the fifth player in MLR history to surpass 1,000 career tackles.

Week 11

- The Chicago Hounds become the first team in MLR history to finish the regular season with a perfect record, going 10-0-0 and finishing with 50 points, the maximum amount possible. The team also sets league records for points-per-game (46.1) and tries-per-game (6.9).

Semi-Finals

- The Chicago Hounds and California Legion advance to the MLR Championship Final for the first time in their franchises' histories.
- The California Legion and Seattle Seawolves score a combined 77 points, while the Chicago Hounds and Old Glory DC score a combined 81 points, the two highest scoring playoff games in MLR history.
- The Chicago Hounds set MLR records for points scored (59) and winning margin (37) in a playoff game.
- Duncan Matthews (SEA) becomes the seventh player in MLR history with 5,000 career meters gained.
- Coby Miln (CAL) sets a new MLR record for points scored in a playoff game (23).

Championship Final

- The Chicago Hounds win their first championship, defeating the California Legion, 35-17. The Hounds are the first team in MLR season to complete a perfect season. Lucas Rumball earned Man-of-the-Match honors.
- The 52-combined points scored makes the 2026 MRL Championship Final the highest-scoring championship game in league history.The Hounds set records for points scored in an MLR Championship Final (35), and total points scored in single postseason (94).

Postseason

- Jason Robertson (DC) wins the inaugural Comeback Player of the Year Award.

== Format and competition ==
In December 2025, Major League Rugby (MLR) announced the schedule for the upcoming 2026 season, which included major changes to the competition's format. At the time of the scheduled release, five MLR teams had folded (Houston SaberCats, Miami Sharks, New Orleans Gold, and Utah Warriors), while two other clubs (San Diego Legion, RFC Los Angeles) merged to create a new team known as California Legion. Subsequently six teams were still active in the MLR.

The new season format, as announced by the MLR, is a six-team competition, without any conference divisions:

- Each team plays ten regular-season games, facing every other team twice (home and away).
- The top four teams qualify for the playoffs; #1 vs #4 and #2 vs #3 in the semi-finals.

=== Officiating ===
Ahead of the 2026 season, MLR announced the introduction of the Referee Review System (RRS), replacing the television match official (TMO) with an In Stadium Replay Operator (ISRO) with the goal of enhancing real-time decision-making and ensuring consistency across matches. Under this system, the on-field referee can request assistance or a team may challenge a referee's decision, similar to replay review in other North American sports leagues. Teams will be allowed two challenges per game, and will retain a challenge if the call is successfully overturned.

In addition, unsuccessful challenges within the final five minutes of either half will result in the forfeiture of all remaining team challenges. A review may only be initiated within two phases of play of the incident, with the exception of violations of Law 9, which may be reviewed at any stage of the game. The game clock will be stopped during each review, and teams are unable to substitute during the review. After each match, the league will complete a post-match review to ensure compliance and track statistics from the RRS.

== Teams and personnel ==
=== Overview ===
Team	Stadia information		Coach	Captain
Team	Stadia	Capacity	Coach	Captain
Anthem RC	American Legion Memorial Stadium, Charlotte, North Carolina	10,500	Agustín Cavalieri	Sam Golla
California Legion	The Great Park, Irvine, California	5,500	Stephen Hoiles	Jason Damm
California Legion	Torero Stadium, San Diego, California	6,000	Stephen Hoiles	Jason Damm
California Legion	Wallis Annenberg Stadium, Los Angeles, California	3,000	Stephen Hoiles	Jason Damm
California Legion	St Mary's Stadium, Moraga, California	5,500	Stephen Hoiles	Jason Damm
California Legion	Heart Health Park, Sacramento, California	11,569	Stephen Hoiles	Jason Damm
Chicago Hounds	SeatGeek Stadium, Bridgeview, Illinois (Note: Round 4 fixture was relocated to Geodis Park in Nashville, Tennessee)	20,000	Chris Latham	Lucas Rumball
New England Free Jacks	Veterans Memorial Stadium, Quincy, Massachusetts	5,000	Ryan Martin	Joe Johnston
Old Glory DC	George Mason Stadium, Fairfax, Virginia	5,000	Simon Cross	Rob Harley
Seattle Seawolves	Starfire Stadium, Tukwila, Washington	4,500	Allen Clarke	Riekert Hattingh

=== Locations ===
2026 Major League Rugby season (the United States)

== Regular season ==
=== Standings ===
2026 Major League Rugby standings
Pos	Team	Pld	W	D	L	PF	PA	PD	TF	TA	TB	LB	Pts	Qualification
1	z- Chicago Hounds	10	10	0	0	461	252	+209	69	39	10	0	50	Playoffs
2	c- Seattle Seawolves	10	6	0	4	311	308	+3	43	42	6	1	31	Playoffs
3	x- California Legion	10	5	0	5	330	277	+53	48	41	7	1	28	Playoffs
4	x- Old Glory DC	10	4	0	6	242	300	−58	33	39	4	2	22	Playoffs
5	e- New England Free Jacks	10	3	0	7	215	290	−75	29	42	3	2	17	
6	e- Anthem RC	10	2	0	8	243	375	−132	36	55	5	0	13	

Updated to match(es) played on May 31, 2026. Source: Major League Rugby

Notes

- z – Clinched home field advantage for the entire playoffs
- c – Clinched home field advantage for the conference semi-finals
- x – Clinched playoff spot
- e – Eliminated from playoff contention

=== Round-by-round ===
The table below shows each team's progression throughout the season. For each round, their cumulative points total is shown with the overall log position in brackets:

Team progression
Team	1	2	3	4	5	6	7	8	9	10	11	SF	Final
Anthem RC	5 (1st)	5 (3rd)	10 (2nd)	10 (3rd)	11 (3rd)	Bye	12 (4th)	12 (6th)	12 (6th)	13 (6th)	13 (6th)		
California Legion	1 (2nd)	6 (1st)	7 (3rd)	12 (2nd)	17 (2nd)	Bye	18 (2nd)	19 (3rd)	24 (2nd)	29 (2nd)	29 (3rd)		
Chicago Hounds	Bye	5 (2nd)	10 (1st)	15 (1st)	20 (1st)	25 (1st)	30 (1st)	35 (1st)	40 (1st)	45 (1st)	50 (1st)		
New England Free Jacks	Bye	0 (6th)	1 (6th)	2 (6th)	7 (5th)	7 (6th)	11 (6th)	12 (5th)	16 (4th)	17 (4th)	17 (5th)		
Old Glory DC	Bye	0 (5th)	4 (5th)	8 (4th)	8 (4th)	9 (5th)	10 (5th)	14 (4th)	14 (5th)	16 (5th)	21 (4th)		
Seattle Seawolves	Bye	5 (4th)	5 (4th)	6 (5th)	6 (6th)	11 (3rd)	16 (3rd)	21 (2nd)	21 (3rd)	26 (3rd)	31 (2nd)		
Key:	Win	Draw	Loss	Bye	DNQ = Did not qualify								

=== Matches ===
Home \ Away	ANT	CAL	CHI	FRE	OLD	SEA
Anthem RC	—	26–55	19–33	7–20	14–31	34–25
California Legion	26–39	—	26–36	43–5	42–10	38–31
Chicago Hounds	61–36	48–24	—	50–26	49–31	42–10
New England Free Jacks	38–26	26–21	19–35	—	19–21	11–27
Old Glory DC	29–21	23–36	32–33	24–23	—	25–30
Seattle Seawolves	57–21	33–19	22–59	36–28	33–16	—

Updated to match(es) played on unknown. Source: Major League Rugby
Legend: Blue = home team win; Yellow = draw; Red = away team win.

== Fixtures ==
=== Round 1 ===
March 28, 2026
15:00 PDT (UTC−07)

California Legion	26–39	Anthem RC
Try: Semu 7' m James 40+2' c Sugars 69' c Houston 77' c Con: Miln (3/4) 40+3', 70', 78'	Report	Try: Mooneyham (2) 12' m, 28' c Robb 17' m Storti 56' c Godfrey 63' c Gurovich 74' m Con: Carty (3/6) 28', 56', 64'; Pen: Carty (1/1) 3'

The Great Park, Irvine
Referee: Robin Kaluzniak (Canada)

Bye/s: Chicago Hounds, New England Free Jacks, Old Glory DC, Seattle Seawolves

=== Round 2 ===
April 3, 2026
19:30 PDT (UTC−07)

Seattle Seawolves	33–16	Old Glory DC
Try: Lindemuth 5' c Warner 57' c Smith 80+1' c Con: Coetzer (3/3) 6', 57', 80+1'; Pen: Coetzer (4/4) 34', 39', 48', 75'	Report	Try: Humphreys 54'; Con: Robertson (1/1) 55'; Pen: Robertson (3/3) 9', 25', 51'

Starfire Stadium, Tukwila
Referee: Derek Summers

April 4, 2026
16:00 ET (UTC−05)

Anthem RC	19–33	Chicago Hounds
Try: Smith 21'; Godfrey 68'; Safodien 72'; Con: Carty (2/3) 68', 73'	Report	Try: Flesch 13', 36'; Lopeti 23'; Penalty try 52'; O'Keeffe 59'; Con: Hilsenbeck (3/4) 14', 36', 60'

American Legion Memorial Stadium, Charlotte
Referee: Luke Rogan

April 4, 2026
16:00 PDT (UTC−07)

California Legion	43–5	New England Free Jacks
Try: Taufete'e 16', 40'; Miln 26'; Leaney 50'; Sugars 62'; Crimp 73'; Con: Miln (5/6) 17', 27', 40', 51', 63'; Pen: Miln 35'	Report	Try: de la Rambelje 40+1'

Torero Stadium, San Diego
Referee: Mike Lawrenson

=== Round 3 ===
April 11, 2026
16:00 EDT (UTC-05)

New England Free Jacks	19–21	Old Glory DC
Try: Geiger 10'; Lennon 40'; Salmon 48'; Con: Hodgson (2/3) 11', 41'	Report	Try: Daniel 25', 34'; LeFevre 46'; Con: Robertson (3/3) 25', 35', 46'

Veterans Memorial Stadium, Quincy
Referee: Robin Kaluzniak

April 12, 2026
16:00 EDT (UTC-05)

Anthem RC	34–25	Seattle Seawolves
Try: Robb 7'; Roberts 26'; Esdale 31'; Sherman 60'; Con: Carty (4/4) 8', 26', 32', 61'; Pen: Carty (2/2) 64', 79'	Report	Try: Lindenmuth 22'; Ryan 28'; Rossouw 69'; Con: Coetzer (1/2) 23'; Bennett 70'; Pen: Coetzer 11', 20'

American Legion Memorial Stadium, Charlotte
Referee: Mike Lawrenson

April 12, 2026
20:00 CDT (UTC-06)

Chicago Hounds	48–24	California Legion
Try: Fourie 2', 43'; Rumball 22', 34'; Lopeti 27', Casares 53'; Harvey 59'; Videla 68'; Con: Hilsenbeck (3/7) 35', 43', 60'; Videla 69'	Report	Try: Williams 17'; Sugars 36'; Timpson 65'; Mano 73'; Con: Miln (2/4) 17', 74'

SeatGeek Stadium, Bridgeview
Referee: Luke Rogan

=== Round 4 ===
April 18, 2026
16:00 EDT

Anthem RC	14–31	Old Glory DC
Try: Leonard 47'; Mooneyham 69'; Con: Keane (2/2) 47', 70'	Report	Try: Schumaker 8'; Humphreys 26'; Myhill 31'; Rizzo 34'; Depperschmidt 62'; Con: Robertson (3/5) 9', 32', 34'

American Legion Memorial Stadium, Charlotte
Referee: Shanda Assmus

April 19, 2026
16:00 EDT

Chicago Hounds	50–26	New England Free Jacks
Try: Fourie 7'; Abel 23', 62' de Haas 28'; O'Keeffe 33'; Devoto 40'; Den Hoedt 57'; Albert 57'; Con: Hilsenbeck (3/6) 8', 24', 29'; Botha (1/1) 34'; Videla (1/1) 69'	Report	Try: van der Bank 13'; Sylvia 18'; Tupou 51'; McVeigh 72'; Con: Hodgson (3/4) 14', 52', 73'

Geodis Park, Nashville
Referee: Peter Pender

April 19, 2026

California Legion	38–31	Seattle Seawolves
Try: Treacy 25'; Smith 35'; Houston 44'; Bertranou 68'; Mano 72'; Con: Miln (5/5) 26', 36', 44', 68', 74'; Pen: Miln (1/1) 78'	Report	Try: Coetzer 13', 50'; Liulamaga 18'; Chan-Tung 75'; Con: Coetzer (4/4) 13', 19', 51', 76'; Pen: Coetzer (1/1) 29'

Wallis Annenberg Stadium, Los Angeles
Referee: Derek Summers

=== Round 5 ===
April 24, 2026
22:00 EDT

Seattle Seawolves	22–59	Chicago Hounds
Try: Ryan 18'; Matthews 70'; Chan-Tung 77'; Con: Coetzer (1/1) 19'; Boyer (1/2) 71'; Pen: Coetzer (1/1) 10'	Report	Try: Webster 3', 40', 41'; Rumball 7'; Flesch 13', 36'; O'Keeffe 29'; Oworu 50'; Fourie 56'; Con: Hilsenbeck (5/7) 8', 14', 36', 40', 42'; Botha (2/2) 51', 57'

Starfire Stadium, Tukwila
Referee: David Vosalevu

April 26, 2026
16:00 EDT

New England Free Jacks	38–26	Anthem RC
Try: van der Bank 1'; Hodgson 8'; Tupou 43'; Lennon 48'; Salmon 67'; Con: Hodgson (5/5) 2', 8', 44', 49', 68'; Pen: Hodgson (1/1) 21'	Report	Try: Telea-Ilalio 36'; Going 40'; Akina 72'; Robb 79'; Con: Carty (3/4) 41', 72', 79'

Veterans Memorial Stadium, Quincy
Referee: Luke Rogan

April 26, 2026
19:00 EDT

Old Glory DC	23–36	California Legion
Try: Kirby Myhill 46'; Robinson 69'; Powers 80+1'; Con: Robertson (1/3) 80+2'; Pen: Robertson (2/2) 14', 23'	Report	Try: Houston 10', 42'; Maluia 53'; Mano 71'; Smith 77'; Con: Miln (4/5) 11', 43', 54', 77'; Pen: Miln (1/1) 32'

George Mason Stadium, Fairfax
Referee: Peter Pender

=== Round 6 ===
May 3, 2026
16:00 EDT

New England Free Jacks	11–27	Seattle Seawolves
Try: Salmon 14'; Pen: Hodgson (2/2) 31', 36'	Report	Try: Hand 19', 57'; Ryan 49'; Vavao 79'; Con: Rossouw (2/3) 20', 58'; Hattingh (1/1) 80'; Pen: Rossouw (1/1) 44'

Veterans Memorial Stadium, Quincy
Referee: Robin Kaluzniak

May 3, 2026
18:30 EDT

Chicago Hounds	49–31	Old Glory DC
Try: Fourie 5', 27'; Abel 13'; Flesch 32'; Devoto 36'; Videla 80+1'; Con: Hilsenbeck (4/5) 6', 13', 28', 33'; Videla (1/1) 80+2'; Pen: Hilsenbeck (3/3) 62', 68', 74'	Report	Try: Penalty try 1'; Robertson 7', 70'; Hoyland 19'; Nelligan 55'; Con: Robertson (2/4) 8', 20'

SeatGeek Stadium, Bridgeview
Referee: David Vosalevu

Bye/s: California Legion, Anthem RC

=== Round 7 ===
May 9, 2026
16:00 EDT

New England Free Jacks	26–21	California Legion
Try: Topou 8', 38'; Palmer 18'; Con: Hodgson (1/3)19'; Pen: Hodgson (3/3) 43', 54', 78'	Report	Try: Smith 14'; Bertranrou 58'; Houston 83'; Con: Miln (2/2)15', 59'; Crimp (1/1) 84'

Veterans Memorial Stadium, Quincy
Referee: Mike Lawrenson

May 10, 2026
16:00 EDT

Old Glory DC	25–30	Seattle Seawolves
Try: Rizzo 36', 39'; Hoyland 68'; Con: Robertson (2/3) 40', 69'; Pen: Robertson (2/2) 2', 71'	Report	Try: Fatu 44'; Warner 51'; Hand 56'; Kriel 63'; Con: Rossouw (2/4) 52', 64'; Pen: Rossouw (2/2) 11', 24'

George Mason Stadium, Fairfax
Referee: Luke Rogan

May 10, 2026
18:30 EDT

Chicago Hounds	61–36	Anthem RC
Try: Oworu 8'; Jones 13', 23'; O'Keeffe 25', 31'; Fourie 50'; Webster 59'; Wall 68'; Kinneeveauk 79'; Con: Videla (8/9) 9', 14', 23', 32', 51', 60', 69', 80'	Report	Try: Akina 3'; Momsen 13', 23'; Esdale 42'; Fuala'au 54'; Robb 73'; Con: Carty (3/6) 20', 28', 55'

SeatGeek Stadium, Bridgeview
Referee: Federico Anselmi

=== Round 8 ===
May 16, 2026
16:00 EDT

California Legion	26–36	Chicago Hounds
Try: Bertranou 16'; Mano 31'; Sugars 37'; Apulu 71'; Con: Miln (3/4) 17', 32', 72'	Report	Try: Webster 7'; Devoto 23'; Pifeleti 61'; Flesch 68'; Harvey 77'; Con: Hilsenbeck (4/5) 24', 62', 69', 78'; Pen: Hilsenbeck (1/1) 65'

St Mary's Stadium, Moraga
Referee: Luke Rogan

May 17, 2026
16:00 EDT

Seattle Seawolves	57–21	Anthem RC
Try: Warner 2', 21'; Kotze 8'; Redelinghuys 14'; Tuamoheloa 19'; Rossouw 24'; Matthews 51'; Ryan 65'; Botchar 79'; Con: Coetzer (6/9) 2', 9', 15', 20', 22', 25'	Report	Try: Robb 5'; Roberts 35'; Mooneyham 41'; Con: Carty (3/3) 5', 36', 42'

Starfire Stadium, Tukwila
Referee: Robin Kaluzniak

May 17, 2026
18:30 EDT

Old Glory DC	24–23	New England Free Jacks
Try: Depperschmidt 4'; Penalty try 34'; Hoyland 56'; Con: Robertson (2/2) 5', 57'; Pen: Robertson (1/1) 69'	Report	Try: Lennon 6'; LeSage 25'; Con: Hodgson (2/2) 7', 26'; Pen: Hodgson (3/3) 39', 49', 61'

George Mason Stadium, Fairfax
Referee: Robbie Jenkinson

=== Round 9 ===
May 23, 2026
19:00 EDT

Anthem RC	7–20	New England Free Jacks
Try: Alikhan 48'; Con: Carty (1/1) 48'	Report	Try: Lennon 30'; Niuafe 52'; Gerlach 80'; Con: Hodgson (1/3) 32'; Pen: Hodgson (1/1) 71'

American Legion Memorial Stadium, Charlotte
Referee: Luke Rogan

May 24, 2026
16:00 EDT

Chicago Hounds	57–17	Seattle Seawolves
Try: Kinneeveauk 3'; Brown 17', 43' de Haas 21', 60'; Jones 39'; Videla 48'; Botha 72'; Albert 78'; Con: Hilsenbeck (6/7) 4', 18', 22', 40', 44', 61'; Videla (1/2) 79'	Report	Try: Coetzer 12'; Futi 25'; Pederson 75'; Con: Coetzer (1/3) 75'

SeatGeek Stadium, Bridgeview
Referee: Robbie Jenkins

May 24, 2026
20:00 EDT

California Legion	42–10	Old Glory DC
Try: Smith 4', 47'; Damm 23'; Kofe 40'; Taufeteʻe 66'; Mano 67'; Con: Miln (6/6) 5', 24', 41', 48', 66', 68'	Report	Try: Rizzo 14'; Vermeulen 53'

Heart Health Park, Sacramento
Referee: Robin Kaluzniak

=== Round 10 ===
May 30, 2026
16:00 EDT

Old Glory DC	32–33	Chicago Hounds
Try: Rizzo 12', 23'; Daniel 32'; Myhill 42'; Con: Robertson (3/4) 24', 34', 43'; Pen: Robertson (2/2) 54', 57'	Report	Try: Den Hoedt 5'; Fourie 37', 49'; Flesch 64', 71'; Con: Hilsenbeck (5/5) 6', 38', 50', 65', 71'

George Mason Stadium, Fairfax
Referee: Federico Anselmi

May 31, 2026
16:00 EDT

Anthem RC	26–55	California Legion
Try: Godfrey 22'; Robb 45'; Going 68', 74'; Con: Carty (3/4) 23', 47', 74'	Report	Try: Chan 2'; Williams 19'; Semu 25'; Crimp 28', 55', 61'; Bertranou 37'; Houston 80+2'; Con: Miln (6/8) 3', 20', 25', 38', 56', 62'; Pen: Miln (1/1) 51'

American Legion Memorial Stadium, Charlotte
Referee: Peter Pender

May 31, 2026
21:00 EDT

Seattle Seawolves	36–28	New England Free Jacks
Try: Ryan 13', 49'; Penalty try 44'; Kotze 63'; Rossouw 65'; Con: Coetzer (3/4) 14', 50', 64'; Pen: Jones (1/1) 79'	Report	Try: Hemopo 25'; LeSage 54'; Topou 72'; Mackenzie 77'; Con: Hodgson (4/4) 26', 55', 73', 78'

Starfire Stadium, Tukwila
Referee: Robin Kaluzniak

=== Round 11 ===
June 6, 2026
16:00 EDT

Old Glory DC	29–21	Anthem RC
Try: Bonasso 2'; Robertson 17'; LeFevre 39'; Humphreys 73'; Con: Robertson (3/4) 3', 40', 74'; Pen: Robertson (1/1) 78'	Report	Try: Akina 31'; Smith 48'; Storti 60'; Con: Carty (3/3) 32', 49', 61'

George Mason Stadium, Fairfax
Referee: Federico Anselmi

June 7, 2026
14:00 EDT

New England Free Jacks	19–35	Chicago Hounds
Try: Tupou 32'; Higgins 35'; Lennon 48'; Con: Hodgson (2/3) 35', 49'	Report	Try: Penalty try 24'; Loots 38', 67', 77'; Webster 72'; Con: Videla (4/4) 39', 67', 73', 78'

Veterans Memorial Stadium, Quincy
Referee: Derek Summers

June 7, 2026
22:00 EDT

Seattle Seawolves	33–19	California Legion
Try: Ryan 14'; Matthews 28'; Kriel 32', 59'; Pederson 42'; Con: Coetzer (4/5) 15', 29', 34', 43'	Report	Try: Bertranou 5'; Timpson 37'; Tavai 78'; Con: Miln (2/3) 38', 78'

Starfire Stadium, Tukwila
Referee: Luke Rogan

== Playoffs ==
=== Bracket ===
Semi-finals
June 14 - Tukwila
Seattle Seawolves	34
California Legion	43
June 15 - Bridgeview
Chicago Hounds	59
Old Glory DC	22

Championship Final
June 21 – Bridgeview
California Legion	17
Chicago Hounds	35

=== Semi-finals ===
June 14, 2026
22:00 EDT

Seattle Seawolves	34–43	California Legion
Try: McLean 32', 70'; Rossouw 52'; Con: Coetzer (2/3) 33', 53'; Pen: Coetzer (5/5) 20', 27', 40', 45', 56'	Report	Try: Mano 15'; Damm 41'; Murphy 61'; Lopeti 66'; Con: Miln (4/4) 16', 42', 61', 67'; Pen: Miln (5/5) 9', 24', 34', 58', 74'

Starfire Stadium, Tukwila
Referee: Robin Kaluzniak

June 15, 2026
20:00 EDT

Chicago Hounds	59–22	Old Glory DC
Try: Fourie 14'; Brown 18', 62'; Kinneeveauk 29'; Wall 33'; Flesch 52'; Rumball 61'; Baska 70'; Con: Hilsenbeck (6/6) 15', 19', 30', 34', 53', 61'; Videla (2/2) 62', 71'; Pen: Hilsenbeck (1/1) 6'	Report	Try: Myhill 54'; Humphreys 75'; Robinson 78'; Con: Emery (1/1) 55'; Schucmacher (1/2) 75'; Pen: Emery (1/1) 2'

SeatGeek Stadium, Bridgeview
Referee: Derek Summers

=== Championship Final ===
June 21, 2026
18:00 CDT (UTC−05)

Chicago Hounds	35–17	California Legion
Try: Fourie 6'; Flesch 26'; Wall 47'; Den Hoedt; Con: Hilsenbeck (3/4) 7', 27', 34'; Pen: Hilsenbeck (3/3) 4', 43', 80'	Report	Try: Miln 60'; Timpson 65'; Con: Miln (2/2) 60', 66'; Pen: Miln (1/1) 16'

SeatGeek Stadium, Bridgeview
Attendance: est. 4,400
Referee: Robin Kaluzniak

== Player scoring ==
The top five try and point scorers during the 2026 Major League Rugby season are:

Last updated: June 24, 2026

Most tries
No	Player	Team	Tries
1	(Australia) Theo Fourie	Chicago Hounds	11
2	(Canada) Mason Flesch	Chicago Hounds	10
3	(United States) Paddy Ryan	Seattle Seawolves	7
4	(United States) John Rizzo	Old Glory DC	6
4	(New Zealand) Sione Tupou	New England Free Jacks	6

Most points
No	Player	Team	Pts
1	(New Zealand) Coby Miln	California Legion	115
2	(United States) Christopher Hilsenbeck	Chicago Hounds	104
3	(New Zealand) Jason Robertson	Old Glory DC	88
4	(South Africa) Davy Coetzer	Seattle Seawolves	83
5	(England) Joel Hodgson	New England Free Jacks	75

== Awards ==
Award	Player	Team	Position	Ref.
Coach of the Year	(Australia) Chris Latham	Chicago Hounds	N/A	
Player of the Year	(Canada) Brock Webster	Chicago Hounds	Fullback	
Rookie of the Year	(New Zealand) Campbell Rob	Anthem RC	Hooker	
Back of the Year	(Argentina) Gonzalo Bertranou	California Legion	Scrum-Half	
Forward of the Year	(Canada) Mason Flesch	Chicago Hounds	Flanker/Lock	
Comeback Player of the Year	(New Zealand) Jason Robertson	Old Glory DC	Fly-half	

=== All-League Teams ===
Major League Rugby announced its First and Second All-MLR Teams in July 2026. The Chicago Hounds were the most represented team, with seven players in the First Team and four in the Second Team.

Position	First Team	Second Team
Loosehead Prop	(Canada) Cali Martinez (DC)	(United States) Payton Telea-Ilalio (ARC)
Hooker	(Australia) Theo Fourie (CHI)	(United States) Joe Taufete'e (CAL)
Tighthead Prop	(Australia) Charlie Abel (CHI)	(United States) Tonga Kofe (CAL)
Left Lock	(United States) Jason Damm (CAL)	(United States) Rick Rose (DC)
Right Lock	(United States) Nathan Den Hoedt (CHI)	(United States) Tomás Casares (CHI)
Blindside Flanker	(Canada) Mason Flesch (CHI)	(United States) Cory Daniel (DC)
Openside Flanker	(United States) Paddy Ryan (SEA)	(Australia) Maclean Jones (CHI)
Number-8	(Canada) Lucas Rumball (CHI)	(United States) Benjamin Bonasso (DC)
Scrum-Half	(Argentina) Gonzalo Bertranou (CAL)	(United States) Ruben de Haas (CHI)
Fly-Half	(New Zealand) Jason Robertson (DC)	(New Zealand) Coby Miln (CAL)
Inside-Centre	(United States) Joe Mano (CAL)	(United States) John Rizzo (DC)
Outside-Centre	(Australia) Bill Meakes (CAL)	(Chile) Santiago Videla (CHI)
Left Wing	(United States) Tavite Lopeti (CHI)	(Namibia) Divan Rossouw (SEA)
Right Wing	(United States) Julian Roberts (ARC)	(England) Perry Humphreys (DC)
Fullback	(Canada) Brock Webster (CHI)	(South Africa) Duncan Matthews (SEA)

== Television coverage ==
The 2026 season saw the introduction of Sunday Night Rugby, the league's first weekly primetime game. The broadcast includes a pregame show similar to the NFL's Monday Night Countdown, as well as a post-match show, both hosted by former San Diego Legion and United States international fly-half Will Hooley. The 2026 Sunday Night Rugby schedule consisted of nine regular season matches, beginning in Week 3, as well as one semifinal match during the MLR Playoffs. Matches were broadcast on ESPN+, with a few select matches aired on ESPN2. In addition to Hooley, the broadcast team for the 2026 season consisted of Ben Holden (Play-by-Play Commentator), Claudia Bellofatto (In-Studio Announcer), and Brianna Kim (Analyst/Reporter).

Despite the downsizing of the league from eleven teams to six, MLR saw a 27% increase in streaming viewership per game and a 55% increase in national television viewership per game from the 2025 season.
