= 2026 Major League Rugby final =

Championship rugby match

2026 Major League Rugby Championship Final
- Event: 2026 Major League Rugby season
Chicago Hounds	California Legion
35	17
- Match details
- Date: June 21, 2026
- Venue: SeatGeek Stadium, Bridgeview, Illinois
- Man of the Match: Lucas Rumball (Hounds)
- Referee: Robin Kaluzniak (Canada)
- Weather: Rainy day 61 °F (16 °C); 94% humidity

The 2026 Major League Rugby Championship Final was the eighth Major League Rugby (MLR) championship match, held at the conclusion of the eighth season of the rugby union club competition in North America. The match was played on June 21, 2026, at SeatGeek Stadium in Bridgeview, Illinois. It was contested by the California Legion and Chicago Hounds, with Chicago defeating California 35-17 to claim their first championship and complete the first perfect season in league history. It is currently the highest-scoring championship game in MLR history at 52 combined points, surpassing the previous record of 50 scored in 2025.

== Background ==
=== Road to the final ===
2026 Major League Rugby standings
Pos	Team	Pld	W	D	L	PF	PA	PD	TF	TA	TB	LB	Pts	Qualification
1	z- Chicago Hounds	10	10	0	0	461	252	+209	69	39	10	0	50	Playoffs
2	c- Seattle Seawolves	10	6	0	4	311	308	+3	43	42	6	1	31	Playoffs
3	x- California Legion	10	5	0	5	330	277	+53	48	41	7	1	28	Playoffs
4	x- Old Glory DC	10	4	0	6	242	300	−58	33	39	4	2	22	Playoffs
5	e- New England Free Jacks	10	3	0	7	215	290	−75	29	42	3	2	17	
6	e- Anthem RC	10	2	0	8	243	375	−132	36	55	5	0	13	

Updated to match(es) played on May 31, 2026. Source:

Notes

- z – Clinched home field advantage for the entire playoffs
- c – Clinched home field advantage for the conference semi-finals
- x – Clinched playoff spot
- e – Eliminated from playoff contention

==== Semi-finals ====
14 June 2026
22:00 EDT

Seattle Seawolves	34-43	California Legion
Try: McLean 32', 70'; Rossouw 52'; Con: Coetzer (2/3) 33', 53'; Pen: Coetzer (5/5) 20', 27', 40', 45', 56'	Report	Try: Mano 15'; Damm 41'; Murphy 61'; Lopeti 66'; Con: Miln (4/4) 16', 42', 61', 67'; Pen: Miln (5/5) 9', 24', 34', 58', 74'

Starfire Stadium, Tukwila
Referee: Robin Kaluzniak

15 June 2026
20:00 EDT

Chicago Hounds	59-22	Old Glory DC
Try: Fourie 14'; Brown 18', 62'; Kinneeveauk 29'; Wall 33'; Flesch 52'; Rumball 61'; Baska 70'; Con: Hilsenbeck (6/6) 15', 19', 30', 34', 53', 61'; Videla (2/2) 62', 71'; Pen: Hilsenbeck (1/1) 6'	Report	Try: Myhill 54'; Humphreys 75'; Robinson 78'; Con: Emery (1/1) 55'; Schucmacher (1/2) 75'; Pen: Emery (1/1) 2'

SeatGeek Stadium, Bridgeview
Referee: Derek Summers

=== Venue selection ===
On February 16, 2026, MLR announced that SeatGeek Stadium in Bridgeview, Illinois would host the Championship Final. It is the home stadium of Chicago Hounds and the second league championship to be hosted in the venue, after the 2023 Major League Rugby final.

== Broadcasting ==
The Championship Final was broadcast in the United States on ESPN2, with streaming on ESPN+.

== Championship Final ==
June 21, 2026
19:00 CDT (UTC−05)

Chicago Hounds	35-17	California Legion
Try: Fourie 6'; Flesch 26'; Wall 47'; Den Hoedt; Con: Hilsenbeck (3/4) 7', 27', 34'; Pen: Hilsenbeck (3/3) 4', 43', 80'	Report	Try: Miln 60'; Timpson 65'; Con: Miln (2/2) 60', 66'; Pen: Miln (1/1) 16'

SeatGeek Stadium, Bridgeview
Attendance: est. 4,400
Referee: Robin Kaluzniak
Canada

=== Rosters ===
Chicago Hounds	California Legion

LP	1	(United States) Oti Pifeleti	(substituted off) 60'
HK	2	(Australia) Theo Fourie	(substituted off) 75'
TP	3	(Australia) Charlie Abel	(substituted off) 66'
LL	4	(United States) Brandon Harvey	(substituted off) 55'
RL	5	(Australia) Nathan Den Hoedt	(substituted off) 66'
BF	6	(Canada) Mason Flesch
OF	7	(Canada) Lucas Rumball (c)
N8	8	(United States) Jake Kinneeveauk
SH	9	(United States) Ruben de Haas	(substituted off) 75'
FH	10	(United States) Christopher Hilsenbeck
LW	11	(United States) Peyton Wall
IC	12	(England) Ollie Devoto
OC	13	(United States) Tavite Lopeti	(substituted off) 60'
RW	14	(United States) Noah Brown
FB	15	(Canada) Brock Webster
Replacements:
HK	16	(United States) Jackson Zabierek	(substituted on) 75'
PR	17	(United States) Jake Turnbull	(substituted on) 60'
PR	18	(Brazil) Wilton Rebolo	(substituted on) 66'
LK	19	(United States) Tomás Casares	(substituted on) 55'
FL	20	(United States) Emmanuel Albert	(substituted on) 66'
SH	21	(United States) Michael Baska	(substituted on) 75'
FH	22	(South Africa) Reece Botha
CE	23	(Chile) Santiago Videla	(substituted on) 60'
Coach:
(Australia) Chris Latham

LP	1	(Tonga) Ma'ale Muti	(substituted off) 35'
HK	2	(United States) Joe Taufete'e	(substituted off) 55'
TP	3	(United States) Tonga Kofe	(substituted off) 55'
LL	4	(Fiji) Keni Nasoqeqe	(substituted off) 48'
RL	5	(United States) Jason Damm (c)
BF	6	(United States) Lance Williams	(substituted off) 25'	(substituted on) 35'
OF	7	(England) Ed Timpson	(substituted off) 75'
N8	8	(Australia) Ben Houston
SH	9	(Argentina) Gonzalo Bertranou
FH	10	(New Zealand) Coby Miln
LW	11	(United States) Joe Mano	(substituted off) 75'
IC	12	(Australia) Bill Meakes
OC	13	(United States) Cassh Maluia
RW	14	(Australia) Oscar Treacy	(substituted off) 32'	(substituted on) 43'	(substituted off) 59'
FB	15	(New Zealand) Rory van Vugt
Replacements:
HK	16	(United States) Ale Lopeti	(substituted on) 32'	(substituted off) 35'	(substituted on) 55'
PR	17	(Australia) Declan Leaney	(substituted on) 35'
PR	18	(United States) Justus Tavai	(substituted on) 25'	(substituted off) 43'	(substituted on) 55'
LK	19	(United States) Ronan Murphy	(substituted on) 48'
FL	20	(United States) Cyrille Cama	(substituted on) 75'
SH	21	(United States) Tasman Smith
CE	22	(United States) Corbin Smith	(substituted on) 59'
WG	23	(New Zealand) Cole Semu	(substituted on) 75'
Coach:
(Australia) Stephen Hoiles

== Officials ==
Referee: Robin Kaluzniak

Touch Judge/Assistant 1: Derek Summers

Touch Judge/Assistant 2: Luke Rogan

Robin Kaluzniak, who officiated more matches in Major League Rugby in the 2026 season than any other referee, became the first Canadian official to referee an MLR final.
