= 2025 MLR Draft =

General information
- Date: August 21, 2025

Overview
- League: Major League Rugby
- Teams: 8

The 2025 Major League Rugby Collegiate Draft was the sixth annual for rugby union in North America, held on August 21, 2025.

== Format ==
The 2025 MLR Collegiate Draft was held on August 21, 2025. The first round was broadcast on ESPNU, with the second and third rounds announced via team's social media. 26 players were selected across three rounds. Eight teams participated in the draft, though the Houston SaberCats and Utah Warriors would both fold prior to the 2026 Major League Rugby season.

== Player Selection ==
Round	Pick #	Team	Player	Position	College
1	1	Anthem RC	Will Sherman	Lock	UCLA
1	2	Anthem RC	Campbell Robb	Hooker	Central Washington
1	3	Seattle Seawolves	Tiai Vavao	Flanker	Central Washington
1	4	Old Glory DC	Connor Devos	Prop	Lindenwood
1	5	California Legion	Oscar Treacy	Wing	Central Washington
1	6	Chicago Hounds	Elias Garza	Prop	Life University
1	7	Utah Warriors	Jacob Ince	Center	University of Guelph
1	8	California Legion	Ieremia Ieremia	Flanker	California
1	9	New England Free Jacks	Adam Chadwick	Hooker	Life University
2	10	New England Free Jacks	Tevita Mapa	Flanker	Life University
2	11	Seattle Seawolves	Charlie Walsh	Prop	California
2	12	Old Glory DC	Jamie Phillips	Hooker	Dartmouth
2	13	California Legion	Joshua Cox	Fullback	UCLA
2	14	Chicago Hounds	Bastien Brunello	Fullback	Mount St. Mary's University
2	15	Utah Warriors	Filimone Manu	Fullback	American International College
2	16	Houston SaberCats	King Matu Jr.	Flanker	Saint Mary's College of California
2	17	New England Free Jacks	Leon Best	Prop	Life University
3	18	Anthem RC	Chad Tinney	Prop	Lindenwood
3	19	New England Free Jacks	Jack Worobel	Lock	Vermont
3	20	Seattle Seawolves	Keelin Coyle	Fly-Half	South Florida
3	21	Old Glory DC	Merlin M'Cloud	Flanker	Victoria
3	22	California Legion	Grant Meadows	Flanker	Brock University
3	23	Chicago Hounds	Lachlan McDonald	Fullback	Walsh University
3	24	Utah Warriors	Jacob Hall	Scrum-Half	Arizona
3	25	Houston SaberCats	Ian Roudybush	Flanker	Penn State
3	26	New England Free Jacks	Remy Thomson	Scrum-Half	Walsh University

Source: MLR

Players were selected from 17 different schools, including three in Canada, with Life University leading all universities with four players drafted. For the first time, every player selected had some form of national collegiate honors on their resume.
