= Cali Martinez =

Canadian rugby union player

- Full name: Calixto José Martinez
- Born: 13 October 1996 (age 30) White Rock, British Columbia, Canada
- Height: 174 cm (5 ft 9 in)
- Weight: 116 kg (256 lb; 18 st 4 lb)

Rugby union career
- Position: Prop
- Current team: Old Glory DC
Senior career
Years	Team	Apps	(Points)
2023–	Old Glory DC	45	(0)
- Correct as of 12 December 2025
International career
Years	Team	Apps	(Points)
2015	Canada U20		
2024–	Canada	12	(0)
- Correct as of 12 December 2025

Cali Martinez (born 13 October 1996) is a Canadian rugby union player, currently playing for Old Glory DC in Major League Rugby (MLR). His preferred position is prop.

== Early career ==
Martinez is from White Rock, British Columbia and attended the University of British Columbia where he won the Canadian University Championship. He attended the Earl Marriott high school in the region before this. In 2015, he represented the Canada U20 team.

== Professional career ==
Martinez was drafted third overall in the 2022 MLR Draft by Old Glory DC, making him the highest selection for a Canadian player. He made his debut for the side in round 1 of the 2023 Major League Rugby season against the Chicago Hounds. He would make a further eleven appearances in 2023. He has remained with the side since, re-signing for the 2026 Major League Rugby season in November 2025.

Martinez made his debut for the Canada national team in July 2024, debuting against Romania.
