= California Legion =

Professional rugby union team in California

- Founded: July 30, 2025; 15 months ago
- Location: Los Angeles County; Orange County; San Diego County
- Region: Southern California
- Grounds: Championship Soccer Stadium (Capacity: 5,500); Torero Stadium (Capacity: 6,000); Wallis Annenberg Stadium (Capacity: 2,145); Saint Mary's Stadium (Capacity: 5,500); Heart Health Park (Capacity: 11,569)
- CEO: Adam Freier
- Coach: Glen Jackson
- Captain: Jason Damm
- Most appearances: 7 players (12)
- Top scorer: Coby Miln (130)
- Most tries: Ben Houston & Joe Mano (both 6)
- League: Major League Rugby
- 2026: Runners-Up; 3rd in MLR

Official website
- legion.rugby

The California Legion are a professional rugby union team based in Southern California that competes in Major League Rugby (MLR). The team was established in July 2025 following a merger between two former Southern Californian MLR teams: San Diego Legion and Rugby Football Club Los Angeles. The team began play in the 2026 Major League Rugby.

== History ==
During the months after the 2025 Major League Rugby season four teams from across the league had merged or disbanded. Beginning with the July 30 announcement of a merger between San Diego Legion and Rugby Football Club Los Angeles of Southern California, the same day New Orleans Gold announced it would not take part in the 2026 season. Less than two months later, in September 2025 another MLR franchise, the Houston Sabercats, also announced they would not be taking part in the 2026 season.

The San Diego Legion, for which the California Legion's logo is based on, were a foundation team for MLR. During their tenure they achieved one conference title, and made two Championship Final appearances (2019, 2023). The Rugby Football Club Los Angeles was established in late 2023 after being relocated from Atlanta.

The California Legion made their on-field debut on March 28, 2026, losing to Anthem Rugby Carolina 39-26 at Championship Soccer Stadium in Irvine, California. California would win their first game the following week over the New England Free Jacks 45-3. The Legion would finish their inaugural season with a record of five wins and five losses, finishing third in the standings and qualifying for the playoffs. In the 2026 semifinals, the Legion defeated the Seattle Seawolves 43-34, the highest scoring postseason game in MLR history to that point. Legion fly-half Coby Miln set an MLR record for points in a post-season match with 23. The Legion would lose to the Chicago Hounds in the 2026 MLR final. Scrum-half Gonzalo Bertranou earned MLR Back of the Year honors for the second-consecutive season.

In September 2026, Legion head coach Stephen Hoiles departed the team to take an assistant coaching position with the New South Wales Waratahs. Three days later, former Fijian Drua coach and international referee Glen Jackson was announced as the new head coach of the Legion.

== Players and personnel ==
=== Current squad ===
The California Legion squad for the 2026 Major League Rugby season is:

2026 California Legion squad
**Props**: (Samoa) Fred Apulu *; (United States) **Tonga Kofe**; (Australia) Declan Leaney; (United States) Ma'ake Muti; (Scotland) Michael Scott; (United States) Justus Tavai; **Hookers**: (Fiji) Cyrille Cama *; (United States) Ale Lopeti; (England) Ben Sugars; (United States) **Joe Taufeteʻe**; **Locks**: (United States) **Jason Damm** **(c)**; (United States) **Vili Helu**; (United States) Chase Jones; (Fiji) Keni Nasoqeqe *	**Back row**: (Australia) Ben Houston; (United States) Ronan Murphy; (United States) **Christian Poidevin**; (England) Ed Timpson; (South Africa) Jurie van Vuuren; (United States) **Lance Williams**; **Scrum-halves**: (Argentina) **Gonzalo Bertranou**; (United States) Tas Smith; **Fly-halves**: (United States) Matt Anticev; (Wales) Steffan Crimp *; (New Zealand) Coby Miln	**Centres**: (Australia) Nick Chan; (United States) **Cassh Maluia**; (Australia) Bill Meakes; (New Zealand) Cole Semu *; **Wings**: (United States) **Ryan James**; (United States) **Joe Mano**; (Australia) Oscar Treacy *; **Fullbacks**: (United States) Corbin Smith; (New Zealand) Rory van Vugt
**(c)** denotes the team captain. **Bold** denotes internationally capped players. * denotes players qualified to play for United States on residency or dual nationality. Source:

=== Head coach ===
- (Australia) Stephen Hoiles (2026)
- (New Zealand) Glen Jackson (2027-present)

=== Technical staff ===
The team's technical staff as of 2026 is as follows:

- (Australia) Dave Dennis, Assistant coach, Defence (2026–present)
- (Ireland) Dave Clancy, Assistant coach, Backs (2026–present)
- (New Zealand) Todd Thornley, Assistant coach, Forwards (2026–present)
- (Canada) Sebastian Pearson, Performance lead (2026–present)

== Records ==
=== Season standings ===
Season	Conference	Regular season										Postseason						
Season	Conference	Pos	Pld	W	D	L	F	A	+/−	BP	Pts	Pld	W	L	F	A	+/−	Result
2026	N/A	3rd	10	5	0	5	330	277	+53	8	28	2	1	1	60	69	-9	Lost MLR Championship Final (Chicago)
Totals			10	5	0	5	330	277	+53	8	28	2	1	1	60	60	-9	1 playoff appearance

== Honors ==
=== Players ===
Honor	Player Name	Season	Ref.
MLR Back of the Year	Gonzalo Bertranou	2026	
