= Ollie Devoto =

England international rugby union player

- Born: Oliver Jonathan Devoto; 22 September 1993 (age 33) Yeovil, England
- Height: 1.91 m (6 ft 3 in)
- Weight: 103 kg (16 st 3 lb; 227 lb)
- School: The Gryphon School; Bryanston School
- Occupation: Professional rugby union player

Rugby union career
- Position(s): Centre, Fly-half, Full-back
Amateur team(s)
Years	Team	Apps	(Points)
2000–2012	Sherborne RFC		
Senior career
Years	Team	Apps	(Points)
2012–2016	Bath	85	(60)
2016–2024	Exeter Chiefs	127	(110)
2025–2026	Chicago Hounds	24	(30)
- Correct as of 22 June 2026
International career
Years	Team	Apps	(Points)
2013	England U20	7	(8)
2015–2016	England A	3	(5)
2016–2020	England	2	(0)
- Correct as of 2 February 2020

Oliver Jonathan Devoto (born 22 September 1993) is an English former rugby union player. His position was as a utility back primarily at centre. He made two appearances at international level for England.

== Early life ==
Devoto was born in Yeovil, Somerset and grew up in Sherborne in Dorset. The Devoto surname is of Ligurian origin. He was educated at The Gryphon School in Sherborne. Devoto started playing for his local club Sherborne RFC from when he was seven years old and stayed there through all of their age groups. While with Sherborne, Devoto represented Dorset & Wiltshire at under-16 and under-18 levels and played for the South West under-16 side. He was picked up by the Bath Rugby academy at the age of sixteen, and was granted a sixth form scholarship at Bryanston School.

== Club career ==
=== Bath Rugby: 2012–2016 ===
An injury crisis during the 2012–13 season amongst Bath's backs saw Devoto promoted to the 1st XV squad, and he made his first team debut as a substitute in Bath's Premiership match against London Wasps on 8 September 2012.

On 1 March 2013, Devoto joined RFU Championship side Cornish Pirates on a dual-registration deal but didn't make an appearance for the Penzance-based club.

In March 2014, Devoto was named 2014 LV= breakthrough player for his performances in the 2014–15 LV Cup, as part of the award his former club Sherborne RFC received a £1,000 donation.

Devoto played for the vast majority of Bath's 2015 Premiership final loss to Saracens, replacing the injured Anthony Watson after seven minutes.

=== Exeter Chiefs: 2016–2024 ===
On 15 January 2016 it was announced that Devoto had signed for fellow Premiership side Exeter Chiefs on a three-year contract. In his first season at the club he started in the 2016–17 Premiership Rugby final as Exeter defeated Wasps to become champions of England for the first time in their history. The following season he was a member of the side that won the last edition of the Anglo-Welsh Cup beating former team Bath in the final.

Devoto came off the bench as a substitute during the 2020 European Rugby Champions Cup final as Exeter defeated Racing 92 to become champions of Europe. A week later he started in the 2019–20 Premiership Rugby final as Exeter overcame Wasps to complete an historic league and European double.

Devoto won his last trophy with Exeter when he came on as a replacement during their 2022–23 Premiership Rugby Cup final victory against London Irish. In May 2024 having scored 21 tries in 127 appearances during an eight-year spell it was announced that Devoto would be leaving the club.

=== Major League Rugby: 2025–2026 ===
In 2025, Devoto joined Chicago Hounds. The last game of his career saw him start in the 2026 Major League Rugby final as Chicago Hounds defeated California Legion to become champions for the first time in their history.

In June 2026, Devoto announced his retirement from the sport.

== International career ==
Devoto was a member of the England U19 development team. He was called up to the England U20 side for the 2013 Six Nations Under 20s Championship and made his debut at that level off the bench as his side overcame France 40–10. After impressing in that performance, he was selected at full-back in the final two matches of the tournament, as his England side beat Italy and Wales to retain the Six Nations trophy. Devoto was then included in their squad for the 2013 IRB Junior World Championship and scored a try in England's record 109–0 victory over the United States. He was a replacement in the final as England triumphed over Wales to become junior World Champions for the first time.

In June 2014, Devoto was included in an England XV for their match against the Barbarians. He came on as a replacement for his Bath teammate Jonathan Joseph and played for the last 21 minutes in England's 39–29 defeat. In January 2015, Devoto was included in the England A squad for the first time. On 30 January 2015 he made his first appearance at that level as a replacement against Ireland Wolfhounds.

On 13 January 2016 Devoto received his first call up to the senior England squad by new coach Eddie Jones for the 2016 Six Nations Championship. His only involvement in the tournament was as an unused replacement in the opening round against Scotland as England went on to complete a Grand Slam.

On 29 May 2016 Devoto made his England Test debut as a substitute in their 27–13 win against Wales at Twickenham. In June 2016 he was included in the England A squad that toured South Africa and scored a try in the opening game as England defeated South Africa to win the series. After Joe Marchant was ruled out of their 2017 tour of Argentina through a toe injury, Devoto was called up as an injury replacement although did not make an appearance.

Devoto gained his second and ultimately last cap for England coming on as a substitute in a defeat to France during their opening match of the 2020 Six Nations Championship. He was an unused replacement in the next round against Scotland at Murrayfield as England went on to win the tournament.

== Honours ==
Chicago Hounds

- 1× Major League Rugby: 2026
- All Major League Rugby Second team: 2025

Exeter

- 1× European Rugby Champions Cup: 2019–20
- 2× Premiership Rugby: 2016–17, 2019–20
- 1× Anglo-Welsh Cup: 2017–18
- 1× Premiership Rugby Cup: 2022–23

Bath

- 1× Premiership Rugby runner up: 2014–15

England

- 1× Six Nations Championship: 2020

England U20

- 1× World Rugby Junior World Championship: 2013
- 1× Six Nations Under 20s Championship: 2013
