= Tomás Casares =

American rugby union player

- Born: 11 April 1999 (age 27) Buenos Aires, Argentina
- Height: 193 cm (6 ft 4 in)
- Weight: 105 kg (231 lb; 16 st 7 lb)

Rugby union career
- Position: Lock / Flanker / Number 8
- Current team: Chicago Hounds
Senior career
Years	Team	Apps	(Points)
2023	New England Free Jacks	0	(0)
2024–2025	Miami Sharks	22	(12)
2026–	Chicago Hounds		
- Correct as of 22 January 2026
International career
Years	Team	Apps	(Points)
2024–	United States	3	(0)
- Correct as of 22 January 2026

Tomás Casares (born 11 April 1999) is an Argentine-born American rugby union player, currently playing for the Chicago Hounds in Major League Rugby (MLR). His preferred position is lock, flanker or number 8.

== Early career ==
Casares was born in Buenos Aires, Argentina, but attended college in the United States, attending Thomas More University. He is American qualified through his American-born father.

== Professional career ==
Casares was the 17th overall selection in the 2022 MLR Draft, signing with New England Free Jacks. After not making an appearance for New England in the 2023 season, he was selected by the Miami Sharks in the expansion draft ahead of the 2024 Major League Rugby season. He would debut for the side in their opening fixture against the Chicago Hounds. After making a further 13 appearances in 2024, he would re-sign for 2025. Ahead of the 2026 Major League Rugby season, he signed for the Chicago Hounds.

Casares made his debut for the United States national team in November 2024, debuting against Portugal.
