= Brandon Harvey =

American rugby union player

- Born: 13 June 2002 (age 24) United States
- Height: 199 cm (6 ft 6 in)
- Weight: 117 kg (258 lb; 18 st 6 lb)

Rugby union career
- Position: Lock
- Current team: Chicago Hounds
Senior career
Years	Team	Apps	(Points)
2024–2025	San Diego Legion	9	(0)
2026–	Chicago Hounds		
- Correct as of 20 December 2025
International career
Years	Team	Apps	(Points)
2025–	United States	1	(0)
- Correct as of 20 December 2025

Brandon Harvey (born 13 June 2002) is an American rugby union player, currently playing for the Chicago Hounds in Major League Rugby (MLR). His preferred position is lock.

== Early career ==
Harvey is from the United States and played club rugby for Charlotte Tigers and attended North Carolina. He then moved to Wales to attend Cardiff Metropolitan University.

== Professional career ==
Ahead of the 2024 Major League Rugby season, Harvey signed for the San Diego Legion. He debuted in the side for round 15 of the season against Anthem, and went on to represent the side in that seasons playoffs. He returned to the side for the 2025 season, before signing for the Chicago Hounds ahead of the 2026 Major League Rugby season.

Harvey made his debut for the United States national team in November 2025, debuting against Georgia.
