= Jason Robertson (rugby union) =

Rugby union player

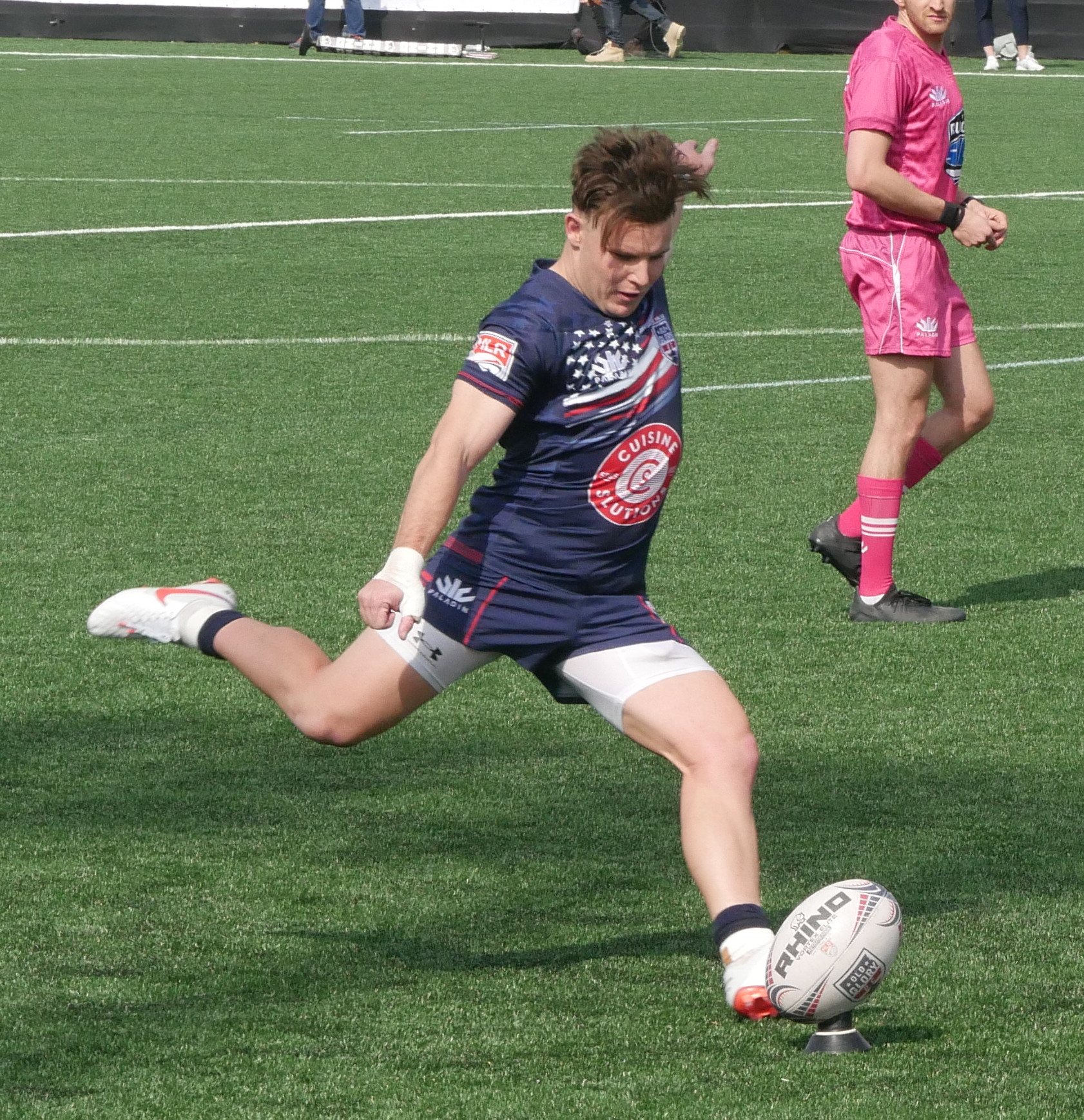
- Jason Robertson kicks a penalty goal for Old Glory DC
- Born: 17 November 1994 (age 32) Harare, Zimbabwe
- Height: 1.75 m (5 ft 9 in)
- Weight: 84 kg (13.2 st; 185 lb)
- School: Ruzawi School

Rugby union career
- Position(s): Fly-half, Fullback, Centre
Senior career
Years	Team	Apps	(Points)
2016	Waikato	5	(35)
2018–2019, 2026–	Bay of Plenty	19	(70)
2020–2021, 2024–2026	Old Glory DC	53	(455)
2020–2021	Counties Manukau	8	(57)
2021–2022	Narbonne	18	(187)
2022–2023	Bayonne	16	(16)
2024	Southland	5	(10)
2026–	Yakult Levins		
- Correct as of 27 April 2026
International career
Years	Team	Apps	(Points)
2026-	Zimbabwe	2	(5)
- Correct as of 14 November 2026

Jason Robertson (born 17 November 1994) is a Zimbabwean-born New Zealand rugby union player, currently playing for Old Glory DC. His preferred position is fly-half.

== Professional career ==
Robertson signed for Major League Rugby side Old Glory DC ahead of the 2020 Major League Rugby season, and re-signed ahead of the 2021 Major League Rugby season.

He had previously represented Waikato and Bay of Plenty in the Mitre 10 Cup. In 2020 he joined Counties Manukau for the 2020 Mitre 10 Cup. After the end of the 2021 season, he signed with French club Narbonne, which was recently promoted to Pro D2.

Prior to the start of the 2024 MLR season, Jason Robertson re-signed with Old Glory DC. Robertson is the highest-scoring player in franchise history and is the MLR's all-time leader in drop goals scored.

Coming back from season-ending injury suffered during the 2025 season, Robertson was named to the All-MLR First team and was awarded the first-ever Comeback Player of the Year Award in 2026.

== Honors ==
- MLR Comeback Player of the Year: 2026
- All-MLR First Team: 2026
