= Mason Flesch =

Canadian international rugby union player (born 1999)

- Born: 18 November 1999 (age 26) Cobourg, Ontario, Canada
- Height: 1.96 m (6 ft 5 in)
- Weight: 113 kg (17.8 st; 249 lb)

Rugby union career
- Positions: Flanker; back row
Senior career
Years	Team	Apps	(Points)
2021–23	Toronto Arrows	27	(0)
2024–26	Chicago Hounds	42	(104)
2026–	Newcastle Red Bulls	0	(0)
- Correct as of 20 July 2026
International career
Years	Team	Apps	(Points)
2019	Canada U20	3	(0)
2021–	Canada	26	(40)
- Correct as of 21 October 2026

Mason Flesch (born 18 November 1999) is a Canadian professional rugby union player, who currently plays as a flanker for the PREM Rugby club Newcastle Red Bulls and the Canadian national team. He previously played for the Toronto Arrows and Chicago Hounds of the Major League Rugby in the USA.

== Professional career ==
Flesch signed for Major League Rugby side Toronto Arrows for the 2021 Major League Rugby season. Flesch made his debut for Canada in the 2023 Rugby World Cup Qualifiers. Following the folding of the Arrows after the 2023 MLR season, Flesch was selected by the Chicago Hounds in a dispersal draft.

In October 2026, he signed for English professional side Newcastle Red Bulls, becoming the first Canadian player to sign for an English top tier side in seven years.

== Honors ==
- 2026 MLR Forward of the Year
