= John LeFevre =

Writer and former investment banker

John LeFevre (born 1980) is a former Salomon Brothers and Citigroup investment banker and bond syndicate executive. LeFevre is known for creating the anonymous Goldman Sachs Elevator (@GSElevator) Twitter handle. The account purported to reflect and satirize banking culture, and accumulated considerable followers and press coverage. Goldman Sachs and Citigroup launched internal investigations in an attempt to identify the source(s) of the tweets. It was later revealed by media outlet Gawker that LeFevre had possibly plagiarized tweets from self-proclaimed 'Gadabout' John Munson.

== Life ==
LeFevre attended Choate Rosemary Hall in Wallingford, Connecticut and Babson College in Wellesley, Massachusetts. LeFevre joined Salomon Brothers in 2001, serving in its New York, London, and Hong Kong offices. The Asset magazine referred to LeFevre as "one of the most prolific syndicate managers in Asia." He later worked for Amias Berman & Co., a capital markets and private equity boutique founded by two former Citi bankers. In 2010, LeFevre signed paperwork with Goldman Sachs to run its Asian bond syndicate desk, but ultimately was prevented from joining Goldman Sachs due to a non-compete clause. LeFevre left the industry in 2012 to write his memoir, which was published in 2015 which and became a New York Times Bestseller. The book was optioned by Paramount as a movie with Zac Efron set to star.

== GSElevator ==
LeFevre created the @GSElevator Twitter in August 2011 as an "homage" to an earlier account called @CondeElevator, which shared supposedly overheard snippets from publisher Condé Nast. He would later describe his goal as "to illuminate Wall Street culture in an entertaining and insightful way". The account proved immediately successful and within a couple weeks, LeFevre (anonymously) was interviewed by Kevin Roose at The New York Times. By 2014, the account had over 600000 followers.

LeFevre later began writing articles and banking guides for Business Insider under the name "Goldman Sachs Elevator".

== Straight to Hell ==
In 2014, LeFevre began shopping around a book proposal based on his life as a banker, to be released under a pseudonym and marketed as by the man behind @GSElevator. The proposed title, under which it was eventually published, was Straight to Hell: True Tales of Deviance, Debauchery and Billion Dollar Deals.

Barron's called the book "a classic of the genre."
