= SeatGeek Stadium =

Soccer stadium in Illinois, United States

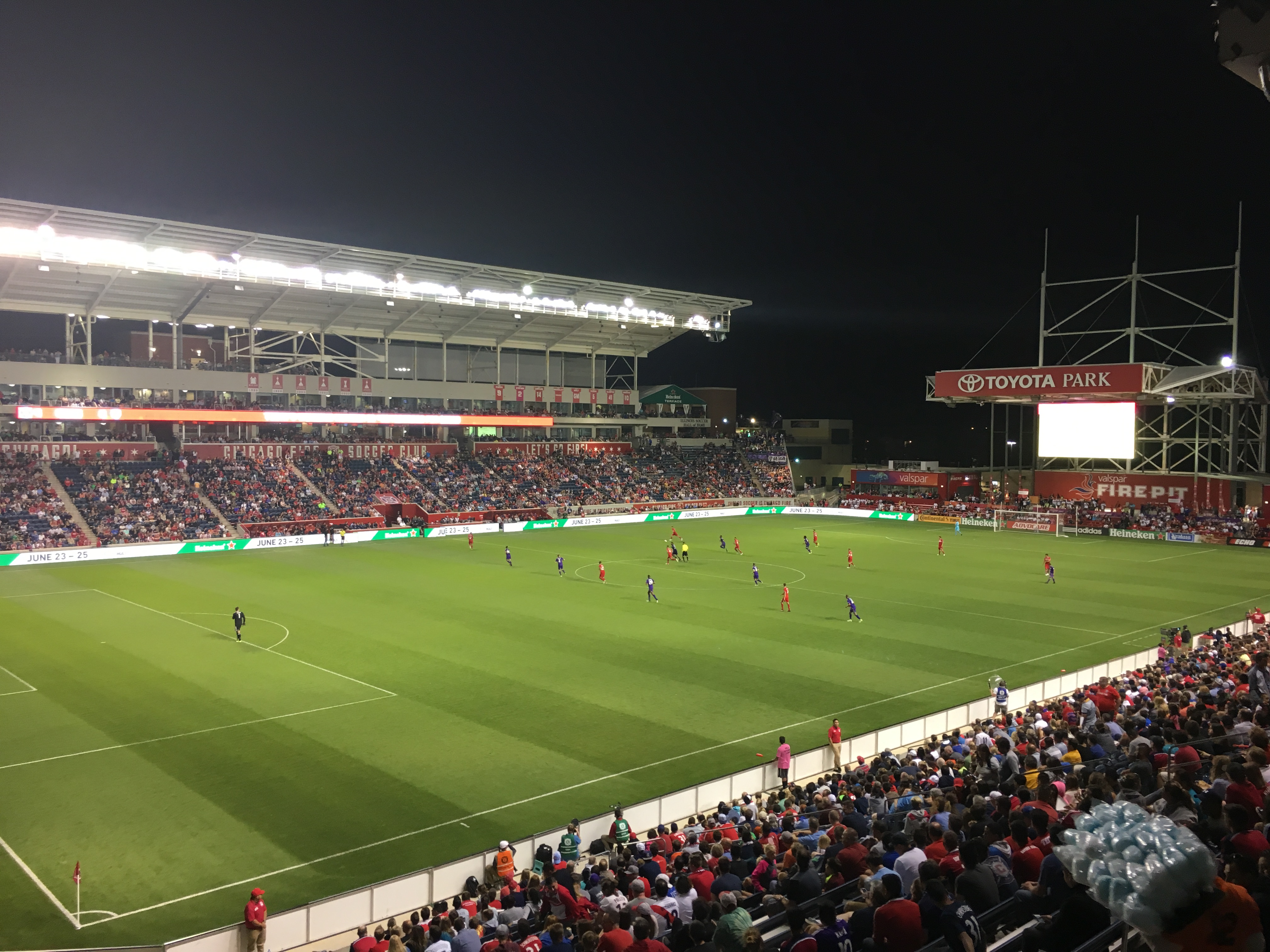
- SeatGeek Stadium (then Toyota Park) in 2017

- Location within Chicago metropolitan area Location within Illinois Location within the United States
- Former names: Toyota Park (2006–2018)
- Address: 7000 South Harlem Avenue; Bridgeview, Illinois; United States
- Coordinates: 41°45′53″N 87°48′22″W
- Owner: Village of Bridgeview
- Operator: Oak View Group
- Capacity: 20,000 (association football) up to 28,000 (concerts)
- Surface: Poa pratensis
- Field size: 120 x 75 yards

Construction
- Groundbreaking: November 30, 2004; 21 years ago
- Opened: June 11, 2006; 20 years ago
- Cost: $98 million ($157 million in 2025 dollars)
- Architect: Rossetti Architects
- Project manager: ICON Venue Group
- Structural engineers: John A. Martin & Associates
- Services engineers: A. Epstein & Sons International
- General contractors: Turner Construction; Harbour Contractors

Tenants
- Soccer: Chicago Fire FC (MLS; 2006–2019, 2020-present, select games); Chicago Fire FC II (MLSNP; 2022–present); Chicago Stars FC (WPS, NWSL; 2009–2010, 2016–2025); Northwestern Wildcats soccer (NCAA DI; 2015); Chicago State Cougars soccer (NCAA DI; 2021); Roosevelt Lakers soccer (NAIA; 2010–2019); Chicago House AC (NISA; 2021); Other: Chicago State Cougars football (NCAA DI; 2026–present); Chicago Hounds (MLR; 2023–present) Chicago Machine (MLL; 2007–2009); Chicago Bliss (LFL; 2011–2012, 2015–2017)

SeatGeek Stadium is a stadium in Bridgeview, Illinois, United States, about 12 miles southwest of downtown Chicago. It is the home stadium of Chicago Fire FC II of MLS Next Pro, the Chicago Hounds of Major League Rugby, and the Chicago State Cougars football team. The stadium has also hosted the Chicago Fire of Major League Soccer, Chicago Stars FC of the National Women's Soccer League, Chicago Machine of Major League Lacrosse, Chicago Bliss of the Legends Football League, Chicago State Cougars men's and women's soccer teams of NCAA Division I, and Chicago House AC of the National Independent Soccer Association. Originally Toyota Park when it opened on June 11, 2006, the facility has a capacity of 20,000 and was developed at a cost of around $100 million. The naming rights agreement with SeatGeek went into effect following the Fire's 2018 season.

== History ==
The Chicago Fire entered Major League Soccer as an expansion team in 1998, playing its first four seasons at Soldier Field in Chicago, which they shared with the National Football League (NFL)'s Chicago Bears. Beginning in 2002, the club moved to Cardinal Stadium (now Benedetti–Wehrli Stadium) in Naperville for two seasons while Soldier Field was renovated, leading to calls for a soccer-specific venue. The Fire received several bids before announcing Bridgeview as the winner in 2003. Construction on the Bridgeview venue began on November 30, 2004, and was completed on June 11, 2006.

=== Naming rights ===
In 2006, Toyota entered into a ten-year naming rights agreement and renamed the new stadium Toyota Park. In 2016, it was reported that Toyota had opted against renewing their naming rights. Despite this, the stadium continued to be known as Toyota Park through the 2018 season. Afterwards, new sponsor SeatGeek assumed stadium naming rights starting with the 2019 Fire season.

The naming rights agreement signed in 2018 was the first such agreement SeatGeek entered into. It was reported that as part of the deal, SeatGeek would also serve as the venue's primary ticketing service starting in 2019. The company reportedly promised that they would work to "bring more live programming, including premier concerts, music festivals and international sporting events" to the stadium.

=== Future ===
The Fire and Bridgeview began negotiating a re-evaluation of the stadium lease in 2018, shortly after Joe Mansueto acquired his stake in the team. In early April 2019, several media reports emerged about a potential contract buyout that would allow the Fire to move back to Chicago, playing temporarily at Soldier Field once again. On May 8, 2019, Fire president Nelson Rodriguez confirmed that the team was negotiating a tentative deal with the village to terminate their lease, which was slated to run through 2036, at an estimated cost of $65 million. The terms of the deal were confirmed on July 9, 2019. In consideration for releasing the Fire and MLS from the lease, the Fire will put money toward a "multisport recreation and entertainment center" at the site. On September 3, 2025, the Stars announced plans to move to Northwestern University for the 2026 season. On January 27, 2021, Chicago House AC of the NISA announced that they had selected SeatGeek Stadium as their home.

Nevertheless, beginning in 2022, because of Soldier Field availability, the Fire have played late-season and playoff matches at the stadium while its new Chicago stadium is being built. Moreover, its MLS Next Pro affiliate Chicago Fire FC II is based out of Bridgeview.

== Design ==
Incorporating traditional stadium features from American and European facilities, SeatGeek Stadium includes predominantly covered seating, a brick facade and stone entry archway, and first rows placed fewer than three yards from the field. It includes 42 executive suites, six larger party suites, the Illinois Soccer Hall of Fame, and the Fire club offices, as well as a large stadium club/banquet room measuring over 9,000 square feet (840 m^{2}).

A practice facility with two fields (one natural grass; the other artificial turf) for the Fire club and its youth programs lies next to the stadium. The stadium's design allows expansion of 50% more seating at negligible expense. Its 120-by-75-yard (110 by 69 m) natural grass field's $1.7 million turf management system comprises full heating, drainage, and aeration capabilities.

A permanent stage allows the stadium to host concerts and quickly change configurations. A typical conversion from soccer to stage takes no more than 18 hours. The field accommodates 8,000 additional chairback seats for concerts and other stage events. SeatGeek Stadium is currently operated by Spectra.

In July 2016, two large-scale murals were designed and painted by artist Tony Passero on the east and west walls of the stadium's stage suites. The murals measure 14 feet high by 27 feet in length, and are named "Offense" and "Defense".

== Major soccer events ==
Date	Teams	Competition	Attendance
September 10, 2008	United States 3–0 Trinidad and Tobago	2010 FIFA World Cup qualification–CONCACAF	11,452
October 11, 2016	Mexico 1–0 Panama	Friendly	19,017
June 8, 2021	Canada 4–0 Suriname	2022 FIFA World Cup Qualification - CONCACAF	0
June 15, 2021	Canada 3–0 Haiti	2022 FIFA World Cup Qualification - CONCACAF	0

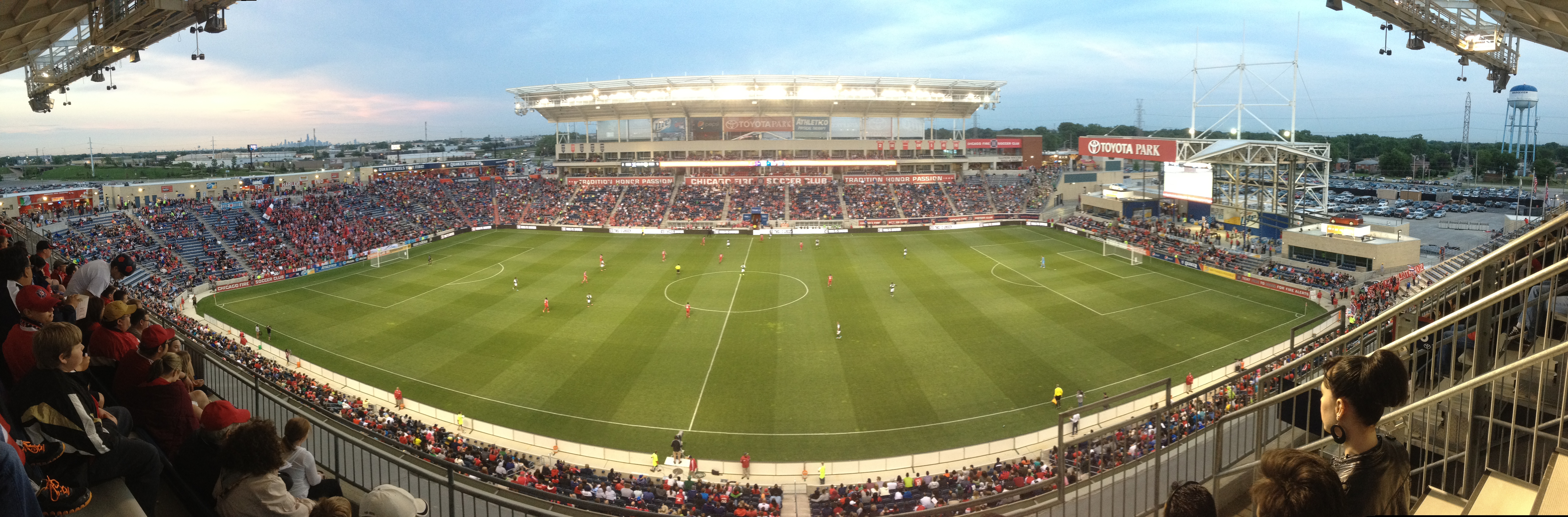
Panoramic view of SeatGeek Stadium (then Toyota Park) on June 8, 2013, during a regular season match between the Chicago Fire and the Portland Timbers. Downtown Chicago is visible on the horizon on the left.

On November 27, 2010, SeatGeek Stadium was the venue for the 2011 FIFA Women's World Cup qualification match between USA and Italy; USA defeated Italy 1–0 and advanced to the World Cup. SeatGeek Stadium was the venue for the 2006 MLS All-Star Game, in which the MLS side defeated Chelsea F.C. 1–0. The stadium also hosted the 2006 Lamar Hunt U.S. Open Cup's final, in which the Chicago Fire defeated the LA Galaxy 3–1.

SeatGeek Stadium hosts annual friendly matches between Chicago Fire and the popular European and Mexican clubs, which in the past included Tottenham Hotspur F.C., A.C. Milan, Everton, C.D. Guadalajara, Club America, Santos Laguna, and others. SeatGeek Stadium hosted four matches during the group stage of the 2014 CONCACAF Women's Championship.

== Rugby union ==
SeatGeek Stadium hosted its first international rugby match in 2007, with the United States Eagles losing 6–10 to provincial side Munster. In June 2008 the stadium hosted three matches of the Churchill Cup, including United States vs Canada, England Saxons vs Scotland A, and Ireland Wolfhounds vs Argentina Jaguares. On June 6, 2009, the stadium hosted a 2009 mid-year rugby test series match between United States and Wales in a warmup match for the US in its campaign to qualify for the 2011 Rugby World Cup.

Date	Winner	Score	Opponent	Competition	Attendance	Ref.
August 25, 2007	Munster	26–10	United States	2007 Setanta Challenge Cup	8,260	
June 21, 2008	Canada	26–10	United States	2008 Churchill Cup Bowl Final	—N/a	
June 21, 2008	Ireland A	33–8	Argentinian XV	2008 Churchill Cup Plate Final	—N/a	
June 21, 2008	England A	36–19	Scotland A	2008 Churchill Cup Final	—N/a	
June 13, 2009	Wales	48–15	United States	June tests	6,264	
November 4, 2016	Māori All Blacks	54–7	United States	end-of-year tests	18,700	
July 5, 2024	Romania	22–20	United States	mid-year tests	—N/a	

When the Chicago Hounds joined Major League Rugby ahead of the 2023 season, SeatGeek Stadium was announced as their home stadium. SeatGeek Stadium hosted the 2023 and 2026 MLR finals.

== Other sports events ==
SeatGeek Stadium served as the home site for Roosevelt University men's and women's soccer matches from 2010 until 2019, when the team moved their matches to Illinois Institute of Technology's on-campus stadium. It was announced in December 2019 that the Chicago Blitz of the Extreme Football League would play their inaugural season at SeatGeek Stadium.

The first college football game at the stadium took place on September 7, 2013, between DIII schools John Carroll and Saint Norbert, a game which John Carroll won 41–0.

For their 2021 season, the Chicago State Cougars men's and women's soccer teams played at the stadium.

== Concerts and music festivals ==
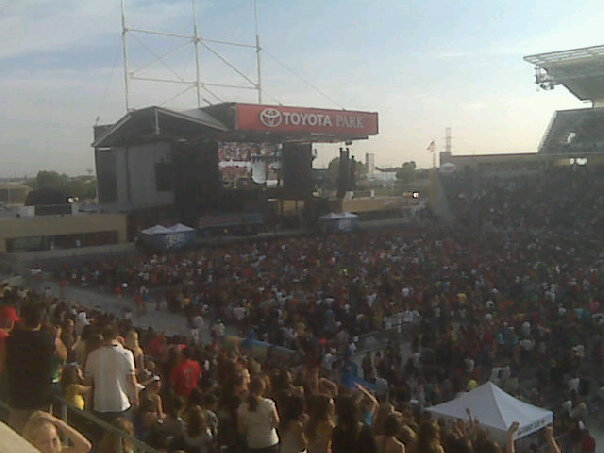
The concert stage at SeatGeek Stadium, as seen during the 2010 B96 Pepsi Summer Bash

From 2006 to 2015, SeatGeek Stadium has been the host venue for Chicago radio station B96's annual summer concert, The B96 Pepsi Summer Bash. The Crossroads Guitar Festival was held on July 28, 2007, and again on June 26, 2010.

=== Concerts ===
Date	Artist(s)	Opening act(s)	Tour	Tickets sold	Revenue	Additional notes
July 8, 2007	Dave Matthews Band	Guster	2007 Summer Tour	—	—	
June 6, 2008	Dave Matthews Band	Sharon Jones & the Dap-Kings	2008 Summer Tour	—	—	
July 24, 2008	Jimmy Buffett	—	The Year of Still Here Tour	—	—	
July 26, 2008	Jimmy Buffett	—	The Year of Still Here Tour	—	—	
June 13, 2009	Kelly Clarkson	—	All I Ever Wanted Summer Fair Tour	—	—	This concert was a part of the "B96 Pepsi SummerBash"
July 31, 2009	Korn	Powerman 5000; Filter	Escape from the Studio Tour	—	—	
August 8, 2009	Jimmy Buffett	—	The Summerzcool Tour	—	—	Ilo Ferreria, Jake Shimabukuro and Joe Perry of Aerosmith were special guests.
August 11, 2009	Phish	—	Late Summer Tour 2009	—	—	
August 15, 2009	Jimmy Buffett	—	The Summerzcool Tour	—	—	Ilo Ferreria was the special guest. This show featured a unique medley of "Tryin’ to Reason with Hurricane Season" with a verse of "Banana Republics" in the middle before going back to "Tryin’ to Reason with Hurricane Season."
June 11, 2010	Phish	—	Early Summer Tour 2010	—	—	
August 14, 2010	Jimmy Buffett	—	Under the Big Top Tour	—	—	
June 9, 2011	Kenny Chesney	Billy Currington; Uncle Kracker	Goin' Coastal Tour	—	—	
July 23, 2011	Jimmy Buffett	Ilo Ferreira	Welcome to Fin Land Tour	—	—	This show was plagued by many technical issues before the power finally went out after Fins. Jimmy performed the first encore while they waited for power to be restored. Once restored, the band came back for the second encore.
August 26, 2012	Evanescence; Chevelle; Halestorm; Cavo; New Medicine	—	Carnival of Madness	—	—	
July 12, 2013	Bob Dylan	Wilco; My Morning Jacket; Richard Thompson Electric Trio	Americanarama Festival of Music	11,075 / 13,068	$689,308	
July 14, 2017	Kiss	—	Kissworld Tour	—	—	This concert was part of Chicago Open Air.

=== Music festivals ===
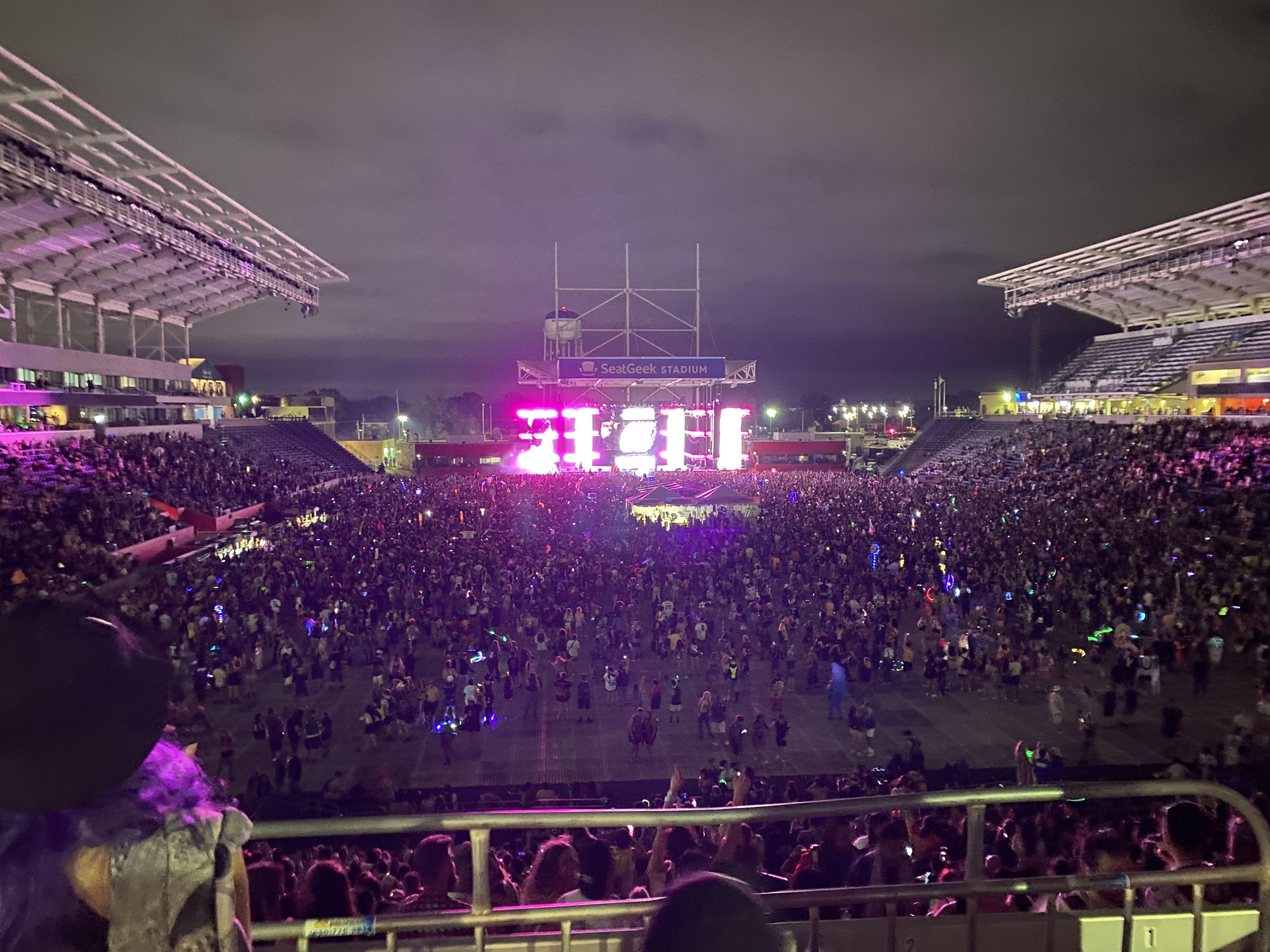
Illenium closing out the night on the stadium stage at North Coast Music Festival 2022

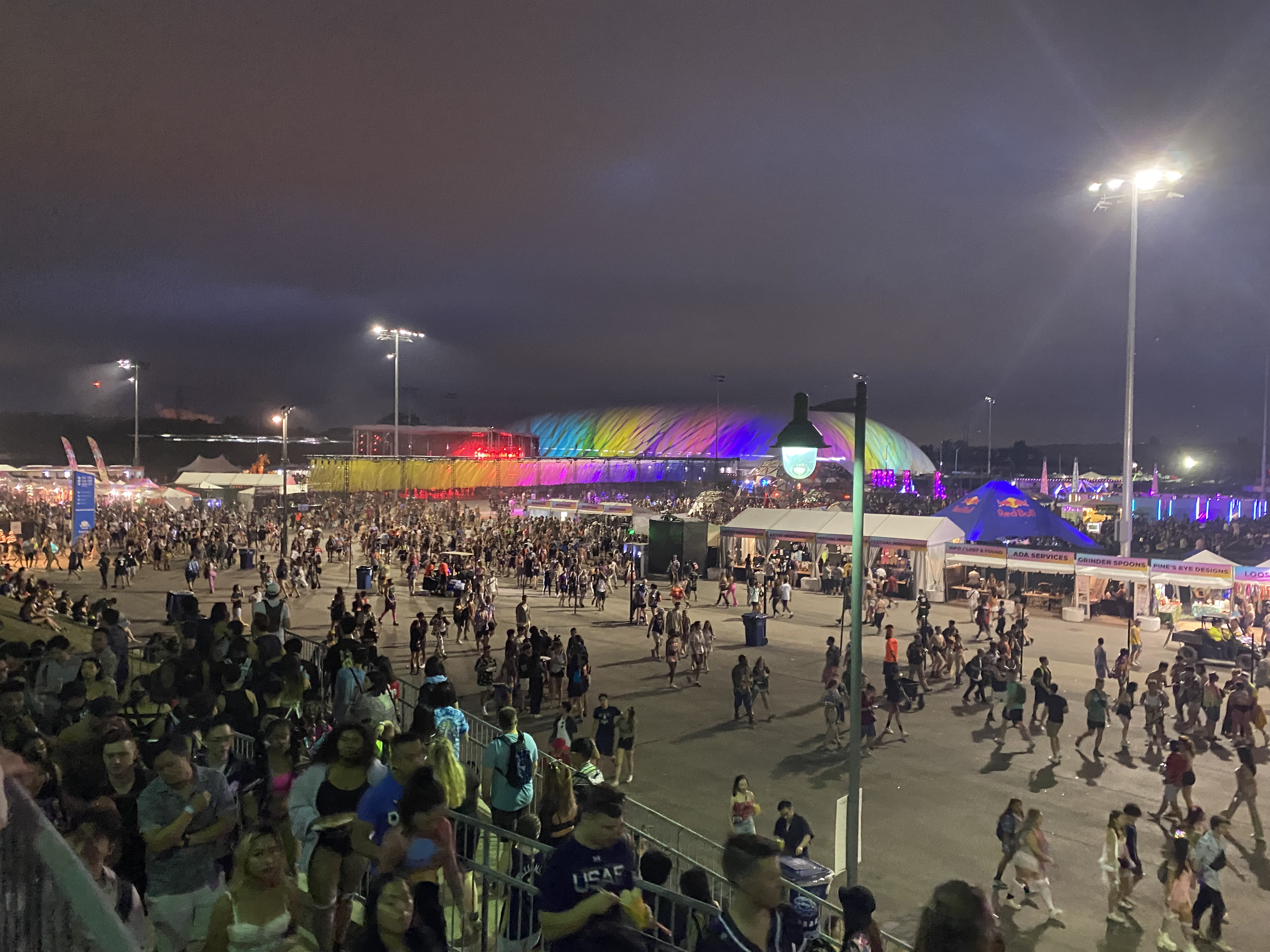
Festival grounds at North Coast Music Festival 2022

Festival	Dates	Headliner(s)
Chicago Open Air	July 14–17, 2016	Rammstein; Disturbed; Slipknot
Chicago Open Air	July 14–16, 2017	Kiss; Korn; Ozzy Osbourne
Chicago Open Air	May 18–19, 2019	System of a Down; Tool
North Coast Music Festival	September 3–5, 2021	Kaskade; Louis the Child; GRiZ; Ganja White Night; Zeds Dead; Rezz
North Coast Music Festival	September 2–4, 2022	Armin van Buuren; Fisher; Illenium; Diplo; Porter Robinson; Kaytranada
The Summer Smash	June 24–27, 2023	Kid Cudi; Future; Playboi Carti

== Accessibility ==
Pace operates the #387 SeatGeek Stadium Express nonstop from the Midway Orange Line Station for Chicago Fire matches and special events. A $2.475 million transit center operated by Pace was constructed at the east end of the stadium's parking lot in 2014.

The Fire had also provided bus transportation from nine different bar locations in the city to and from the games. However upon moving back to Soldier Field that service is no longer offered for SeakGeek Stadium.

== See also ==
- List of sports venues with the name Toyota

Preceded by Soldier Field	Home of Chicago Fire FC; 2006–2019	Succeeded by Soldier Field
Preceded by Red Bull Arena; Centreville Bank Stadium	Host of MLR Championship; 2023; 2026	Succeeded by Snapdragon Stadium; TBD
