= Mark O'Keeffe =

American rugby union player

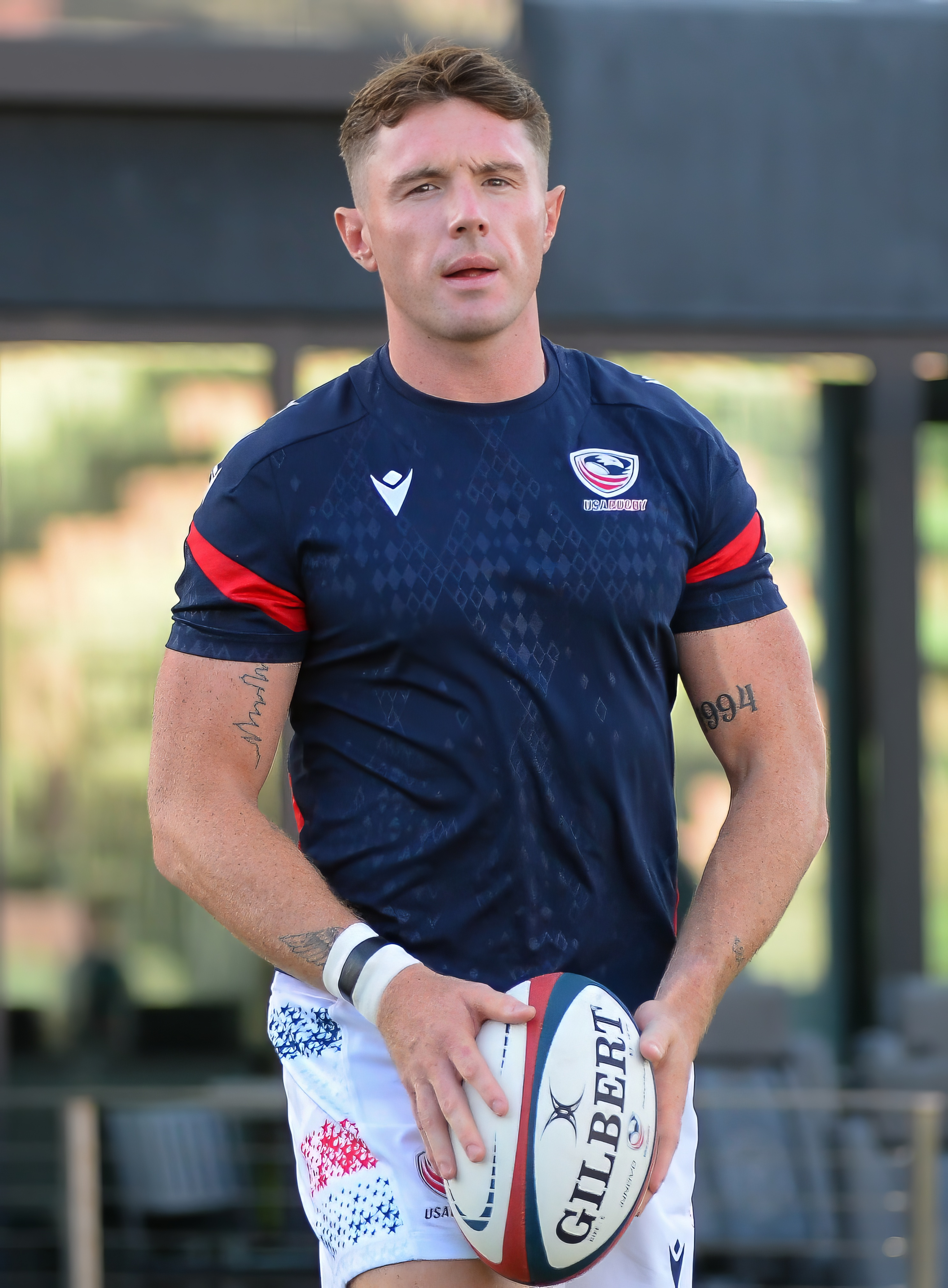
- O'Keeffe with United States men's national rugby union team in 2026
- Born: 13 September 1993 (age 33) Dublin, Ireland
- Height: 185 cm (6 ft 1 in)
- Weight: 101 kg (223 lb; 15 st 13 lb)

Rugby union career
- Position: Centre / Wing
- Current team: Chicago Hounds
Senior career
Years	Team	Apps	(Points)
2019–2020	Rugby United New York	18	(25)
2021	Rugby ATL	13	(35)
2022	Austin Gilgronis	14	(46)
2023–	Chicago Hounds	37	(30)
- Correct as of 8 December 2025
International career
Years	Team	Apps	(Points)
2024–	United States	4	(5)
- Correct as of 8 December 2025

Mark O'Keeffe (born 13 September 1993) is an Irish-born American rugby union player, currently playing for the Chicago Hounds in Major League Rugby (MLR). His preferred position is centre or wing.

== Early career ==
O'Keeffe is from Dublin and attended St Michael's College, Dublin, playing in the 2013 Leinster Schools Cup final. He was a member of both Leinster's and Connacht's academies. He is qualified for the United States on residency grounds.

== Professional career ==
O'Keeffe first signed for Rugby United New York ahead of the 2019 Major League Rugby season. He remained with the team in 2020, however departed when the COVID-19 pandemic cancelled the season. He returned to the States to join Rugby ATL ahead of the 2021 season, before transferring to the Austin Gilgronis ahead of 2022. Following the Gilgronis' departure from competition, he was picked up by the Chicago Hounds ahead of the 2023 season.

O'Keeffe made his debut for the United States national team in November 2024, debuting against Tonga. He scored his first try in the Eagles next fixture against Spain.
