= 2018 South American Six Nations =

- Date: May 5 – May 20, 2018
- Countries: Brazil; Chile; Paraguay; Uruguay; Argentina; Colombia

Final positions
- Champions: Brazil

Tournament statistics
- Matches played: 9

The 2018 South American Six Nations, or 6 Naciones Sudamericano, was the 40th edition of the rugby union tournament between South American national teams. This year the tournament was renamed South American Six Nations, replacing the South American Rugby Championship, which was last played in 2017. For the first time, the tournament had six nations participating, including Brazil, Colombia, Paraguay and Chile. Because of superior quality of their national teams, Uruguay and Argentina sent Uruguay A national rugby union team and Argentina XV national rugby union team, the nations' second national rugby team, for this tournament. Unlike the previous year, this tournament abolished a round-robin format and was divided in two groups: The West Conference, composed of Argentina XV, Chile, and Colombia; and the East Conference, made up of Brazil, Uruguay XV, and Paraguay. Each team played the teams in the other conference once.

As the first South American Six Nations championship, this tournament marked a few milestones. Brazil was the South American champion for the first time, after defeating the Argentinian XV team for 36–33 in Buenos Aires. This was the first time ever a Brazilian side defeated an Argentinian side in international rugby union. Conquering the Championship was a milestone for Brazilian rugby, which have been improving ever since the 2000s and received more investments preceding the 2016 Summer Olympics. Also a first, reigning champions Uruguay decided to use a second team to play the Championship, failing to produce results as they finished fourth. Furthermore, this tournament was also the first time that Colombia entered a first level South American tournament. Like Brazil, rugby in Colombia is still an underdeveloped sport which have been going through a process of increasing investments and improving results in the sport.

== Standings ==
Pos	Team	Pld	W	D	L	PF	PA	PD	BP	Pts
1	Brazil	3	3	0	0	131	50	+81	1	13
2	Argentina	3	2	0	1	161	54	+107	3	11
3	Chile	3	2	0	1	131	48	+83	1	9
4	Uruguay	3	1	0	2	61	91	−30	2	6
5	Paraguay	3	1	0	2	31	187	−156	0	4
6	Colombia	3	0	0	3	36	121	−85	1	1

== Matches ==
=== Round 1 ===
5 May 2018

Colombia	5-26	Uruguay

Cicuentenario Stadium, Medellín

5 May 2018

Paraguay	3-64	Argentina

Héroes de Curupaytí Stadium, Asunción

5 May 2018

Brazil	28-12	Chile

Canindé Stadium, São Paulo

=== Round 2 ===
12 May 2018

Uruguay	20-22	Chile

Charrúa Stadium, Montevideo

12 May 2018

Argentina	33-36	Brazil

Club Newman Stadium, Buenos Aires

12 May 2018

Paraguay	28-26	Colombia

Héroes de Curupaytí Stadium, Asunción

=== Round 3 ===
19 May 2018

Brazil	67-5	Colombia

SPAC Santo Amaro, São Paulo

19 May 2018

Chile	97-0	Paraguay

Old Grangonian Club, Santiago

20 May 2018

Argentina	64-15	Uruguay

Club Newman Stadium, Buenos Aires

== See also ==
- 2019 Rugby World Cup – Americas qualification
