= Campbell Robb =

Irish rugby union player

- Born: 25 February 1882 Galway, County Galway, Ireland
- Died: 6 September 1958 (aged 76) Ipswich, Suffolk, England

Rugby union career
- Position: Wing
International career
Years	Team	Apps	(Points)
1904–06	Ireland	5	(3)

Campbell Robb (25 February 1882 — 6 September 1958) was an Irish international rugby union player.

Born in Galway, Robb attended Campbell College and Queen's College Belfast.

Robb played varsity rugby during his medical studies as a three-quarter for Queen's College RFC and was capped five times on the wing for Ireland from 1904 to 1906, with his only try coming in his last match against Scotland.

An officer in the Royal Army Medical Corps, Robb attained the rank of captain and served in the Middle East in World War I, during which was put in charge of a hospital in Palestine.

Robb was Chief Medical Officer for Egyptian State Railways, prior to independence, and later worked in Ipswich, Suffolk, where he was chairman of the Health Executive Council.

== See also ==
- List of Ireland national rugby union players
