= United States Rugby Players Association =

- Abbreviation: USRPA
- Type: Trade union
- Legal status: 501(c)(5) organization
- Location: United States
- Executive Director: Michael Young
- Website: https://www.usarugbyplayers.org/

The United States Rugby Players Association, also referred to as the USRPA, is the union of professional Major League Rugby players, as well as the national teams for men's XV, women's XV, men's sevens, and women's sevens.

United States Rugby Players Association is a member of International Rugby Players Association (IRPA).

== History ==
On January 25, 2024, Major League and the United States Rugby Players Association announced the signing of a Voluntary Recognition Agreement, allowing the USRPA to become the representative body for all MLR players. In February 2026, the USRPA and MLR signed the first collective bargaining agreement in American rugby history.
