= Paddy Ryan (rugby union, born 1998) =

US international rugby union player

- Born: October 13, 1998 (age 28) County Kildare, Ireland
- School: Newbridge College

Rugby union career
- Position: Flanker
Senior career
Years	Team	Apps	(Points)
2017–20	Northampton Saints		
2020–21	Cornish Pirates		
2021–23	Ampthill		
2023–	Coventry		
International career
Years	Team	Apps	(Points)
2023–	United States	5	(5)

Paddy Ryan (born October 13, 1998) is an Irish-American professional rugby union player.

A native of County Kildare, Ryan is the son of Irish judo champion Paul Ryan and Boston-born Cathy Ryan. He competed with his parents and sister Aoife in the fifth season of RTÉ television series Ireland's Fittest Family. Educated at Newbridge College, Ryan was a Leinster underage representative back-rower and trained with Ulster's sub-academy.

Ryan started his career with Northampton and won a premiership with their reserves (Wanderers) in the 2017/18 season. He remained there until 2020 and played on loan at Bedford, Coventry and Leicester. After Northampton, Ryan had stints with the Cornish Pirates and Ampthill. He was signed by Coventry in 2023 and was first capped by the United States in that year's international against Romania in Bucharest, scoring a debut try in a 14-point win for the Americans.

== See also ==
- List of United States national rugby union players
