= Anthem Rugby Carolina =

Professional rugby union club in North Carolina

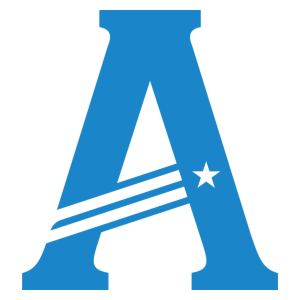
- Nickname: The Rising Stars
- Founded: February 5, 2024; 2 years ago
- Disbanded: 2026; 0 years ago
- Location: Charlotte, North Carolina
- Ground: American Legion Memorial Stadium (Capacity: 10,500)
- Most caps: Dan Hanson (31)
- Top scorer: Luke Carty (59)
- Most tries: Conner Mooneyham & Te Rangatira Waitokia (both 7)
- League: Major League Rugby
- 2026: DNQ; 6th in MLR
Team kit

Anthem Rugby Carolina, shortened to Anthem RC, were an American professional rugby union team based in Charlotte, North Carolina, that competed in Major League Rugby (MLR). The team was founded in 2024, and began to play during the 2024 season. Unlike other MLR teams, Anthem RC was funded by governing bodies, USA Rugby and World Rugby, in the aim to improve the USA Eagles so they may qualify for the 2027 Men's Rugby World Cup, and be competitive for the US-hosted 2031 Rugby World Cup.

== History ==
Anthem RC finished the 2024 season 0–16, the third winless season in MLR history after the 2019 Austin Elite and 2022 Dallas Jackals. Despite the team's struggle, Anthem back Junior Gafa was named MLR Rookie of the Year, with scrum-half Siaosi Nai and left wing Cael Hodgson earning First XV honors.

Anthem RC announced the appointment of Patrick Stack as its first team president on January 14, 2025. On March 31, 2025, Anthem RC became the first team in MLR history to field a roster entirely composed of domestic players in 25–17 loss to the Seattle Seawolves.

After two winless seasons, Anthem RC won the first game in franchise history, defeating the California Legion 39-26 in the opening game of the 2026 season.

During an Inside MLR podcast released on July 29, 2026, Will Hooley and MLR co-president Alexander Magleby announced that the contract between World Rugby, USA Rugby and Major League Rugby had ended, leaving Anthem's future in question. Magleby also commented that the MLR was talking with several groups in the Charlotte metropolitan area to take over Anthem RC or possibly replace it with a new team. While neither the league nor the team released a statement confirming it, America Rugby News reported on the team's disbandment and, as of August 2026, Anthem RC was removed from the MLR website.

== Players and personnel ==
=== Head coach ===
- (Samoa) Alama Ieremia (2024–present)

=== Technical staff ===
The team's technical staff as of 2024 was as follows:

- (South Africa) Neethling Gericke - Assistant Coach, Forwards (2024–present)
- (Samoa) Elvis Seveali'i - Assistant Coach, Backs and Skills (2024–present)
- (United States) Brendan Keane - Assistant Coach (2024–present)
- (Benin) Matoko Noudehou - Physical Performance Coach (2024–present)
- (United States) Zach Fournier - Lead Athletic Trainer (2024–present)
- (United States) Michael Sheridan - Assistant Athletic Trainer (2024–present)
- (United States) Luke Richmond - Analyst (2024–present)
- (Republic of Ireland) Darran Coleman - Team Manager (2024–present)

== Records ==
=== Season standings ===
| Season | Conference | Regular season | | | | | | | | | | Postseason | | | | | | |
| Season | Conference | Pos | Pld | W | D | L | F | A | +/− | BP | Pts | Pld | W | L | F | A | +/− | Result |
|---|---|---|---|---|---|---|---|---|---|---|---|---|---|---|---|---|---|---|
| 2024 | Eastern | 6th | 16 | 0 | 0 | 16 | 323 | 676 | -353 | 7 | 7 | - | - | - | - | - | - | Did not qualify |
| 2025 | Eastern | 6th | 16 | 0 | 0 | 16 | 282 | 570 | -288 | 5 | 5 | - | - | - | - | - | - | Did not qualify |
| 2026 | N/A | 6th | 10 | 2 | 0 | 8 | 243 | 375 | -132 | 5 | 13 | - | - | - | - | - | - | Did not qualify |
| Totals | | | 42 | 2 | 0 | 40 | 843 | 1,621 | -773 | 17 | 25 | - | - | - | - | - | - | 0 postseason appearances |

== 2024 season ==
Anthem Rugby Carolina played 16 games in the 2024 regular season. They did not make the playoffs.

| Date | Opponent | Home/Away | Location | Result |
|---|---|---|---|---|
| March 3 | New England Free Jacks | Home | American Legion Memorial Satdium | Lost, 13–46 |
| March 9 | New Orleans Gold | Away | Gold Mine on Airline | Lost, 34–19 |
| March 17 | Dallas Jackals | Home | American Legion Memorial Stadium | Lost, 28–68 |
| March 23 | Miami Sharks | Away | AutoNation Sports Field | Lost, 50–21 |
| March 30 | Old Glory DC | Home | American Legion Memorial Stadium | Lost, 32–46 |
| April 5 | Utah Warriors | Away | Zions Bank Stadium | Lost, 44–19 |
| April 14 | Chicago Hounds | Away | SeatGeek Stadium | Lost, 59–26 |
| April 27 | New Orleans Gold | Home | American Legion Memorial Stadium | Lost, 5-40 |
| May 3 | Seattle Seawolves | Away | Starfire Stadium | Lost, 29–13 |
| May 10 | Houston SaberCats | Home | American Legion Memorial Stadium | Lost, 15–38 |
| May 18 | RFC Los Angeles | Home | American Legion Memorial Stadium | Lost, 29–33 |
| June 1 | Old Glory DC | Away | Maryland SoccerPlex | Lost, 47–29 |
| June 9 | San Diego Legion | Away | Snapdragon Stadium | Lost, 34–24 |
| June 16 | Miami Sharks | Home | American Legion Memorial Stadium | Lost, 14–30 |
| June 22 | Chicago Hounds | Home | American Legion Memorial Stadium | Lost, 29–38 |
| June 29 | New England Free Jacks | Away | Veterans Memorial Stadium | Lost, 40–7 |

== 2025 season ==
Anthem Rugby Carolina played 16 games in the 2025 regular season.

| Date | Opponent | Home/Away | Location | Result |
|---|---|---|---|---|
| February 15 | NOLA Gold | Away | Gold Mine on Airline | Lost, 35–14 |
| February 21 | San Diego Legion | Home | American Legion Memorial Stadium | Lost, 52–5 |
| February 28 | Miami Sharks | Home | Mecklenburg County Sportsplex | Lost, 32–31 |
| March 8 | Old Glory DC | Away | Maryland SoccerPlex | Lost, 26–22 |
| March 22 | Houston SaberCats | Home | American Legion Memorial Stadium | Lost, 46–45 |
| March 29 | Seattle Seawolves | Away | Starfire Stadium | Lost, 25–17 |
| April 5 | NOLA Gold | Home | American Legion Memorial Stadium | Lost, 33–19 |
| April 13 | Chicago Hounds | Away | SeatGeek Stadium | Lost, 28–20 |
| April 18 | New England Free Jacks | Home | American Legion Memorial Stadium | Lost, 26–6 |
| April 23 | Seattle Seawolves | Home | Mecklenburg County Sportsplex | Lost, 60–19 |
| April 27 | Miami Sharks | Away | Baptist Health Community Field | Lost, 31–5 |
| May 10 | RFCLA | Away | Wallis Annenberg Stadium | Lost, 45–17 |
| May 18 | Old Glory DC | Home | American Legion Memorial Stadium | Lost, 41–19 |
| May 24 | Chicago Hounds | Home | American Legion Memorial Stadium | Lost, 33–19 |
| May 30 | Utah Warriors | Away | Zions Bank Stadium | Lost, 31–10 |
| June 8 | Houston SaberCats | Away | SaberCats Stadium | Lost, 26–14 |

== 2026 season ==
Anthem RC played 10 matches in the 2026 season.

| Date | Opponent | Home/Away | Location | Result |
|---|---|---|---|---|
| March 28 | California Legion | Away | Championship Soccer Stadium | Won, 39–26 |
| April 4 | Chicago Hounds | Home | American Legion Memorial Stadium | Lost, 33-19 |
| April 12 | Seattle Seawolves | Home | American Legion Memorial Stadium | Won, 34-25 |
| April 18 | Old Glory DC | Home | American Legion Memorial Stadium | Lost, 14-31 |
| April 26 | New England Free Jacks | Away | Veterans Memorial Stadium | Lost, 38-26 |
| May 10 | Chicago Hounds | Away | SeatGeek Stadium | Lost, 61-36 |
| May 17 | Seattle Seawolves | Away | Starfire Stadium | Lost, 57-21 |
| May 23 | New England Free Jacks | Home | American Legion Memorial Stadium | Lost, 20–7 |
| May 31 | California Legion | Home | American Legion Memorial Stadium | Lost, 55-26 |
| Jun 5 | Old Glory DC | Away | George Mason Stadium | Lost, 29-21 |

== Honors ==
=== Player ===
| Honor | Player | Season |
|---|---|---|
| MLR Rookie of the Year | Junior Gafa | 2024 |
| MLR Rookie of the Year | Campbell Robb | 2026 |

== See also ==
Anthem Inc
