= Santiago Videla =

Chile international rugby union player

- Full name: Santiago Videla Cambiaso
- Born: 16 January 1998 (age 28) Santiago, Chile
- Height: 1.75 m (5 ft 9 in)
- Weight: 75 kg (165 lb; 11 st 11 lb)

Rugby union career
- Position(s): Fly-half, Wing
- Current team: Selknam
Senior career
Years	Team	Apps	(Points)
2020–2023	Selknam	21	(112)
- Correct as of 28 August 2023
International career
Years	Team	Apps	(Points)
2017	Chile U20	4	(0)
2017–	Chile	17	(116)
- Correct as of 9 October 2021

Santiago Videla Cambiaso (born 16 January 1998) is a Chilean professional rugby union player who plays as a fly-half for Super Rugby Americas club Selknam and the Chile national team.

== Club career ==
Videla developed his ability at grassroots level, representing the Old Boys club in Chile, before joining his first professional side. His first opportunity came when he joined the recently established Selknam club and was a member of the team's initial squad that competed in the Súper Liga Americana de Rugby competition.

Videla made his debut and was selected at fly-half against Peñarol during the 2020 season. He then became a part of Selknam's greatest historic achievement, qualifying for the 2022 final. Despite being a key member of the squad during the season, Videla was not selected to play.

== International career ==
In November 2017, Videla received his first cap for Chile in a match against Kenya. Chile won convincingly, 23–3, showcasing Videla's abilities and potential at world level. This marked the start of Videla's international rugby union career. His debut was particularly noteworthy as it coincided with five other players making their test debuts.

One of the most memorable moments in Videla's international career occurred in July 2022 when he played a pivotal role in Chile's qualification for the 2023 Rugby World Cup. In a closely contested match against the United States, he slotted a crucial penalty goal in the 75th minute, sealing a 31–29 victory in Glendale, Colorado. This historic win secured Chile's spot in the Rugby World Cup.

The pinnacle of Videla's international journey came with his selection to play on the right wing in Chile's first Rugby World Cup match against Japan.

== Career statistics ==
=== List of international tries ===
No.	Date	Venue	Opponent	Score	Result	Competition
1	25 November 2017	Sparda-Bank-Hessen-Stadion, Offenbach am Main, Germany	Germany	10–32	Won	Friendly
2	19 May 2018	Old Grangonian Club, Chicureo, Chile	Paraguay	97–0	Won	2018 South American Six Nations
3	19 May 2018	Old Grangonian Club, Chicureo, Chile	Paraguay	97–0	Won	2018 South American Six Nations
4	19 May 2018	Old Grangonian Club, Chicureo, Chile	Paraguay	97–0	Won	2018 South American Six Nations
5	11 May 2019	Old Grangonian Club, Chicureo, Chile	Uruguay XV	32–39	Lost	2019 South American Six Nations
6	11 May 2019	Old Grangonian Club, Chicureo, Chile	Uruguay XV	32–39	Lost	2019 South American Six Nations
7	9 October 2021	Estadio Elías Figueroa Brander, Valparaíso, Chile	Canada	33–24	Won	2023 Rugby World Cup qualification

As of match played 9 October 2021
