= Christopher Hilsenbeck =

German rugby union player

- Full name: Christopher Hilsenbeck
- Born: 10 January 1992 (age 34) California, United States of America
- Height: 184 cm (6 ft 0 in)
- Weight: 84 kg (185 lb; 13 st 3 lb)
- University: TBS Education

Rugby union career
- Position: Fly-half, Inside Centre
- Current team: Biarritz Olympique
Youth career
- 1998-2008: TSV Handschuhsheim
- 2008-2012: US Colomiers
Senior career
| Years | Team | Apps | (Points) |
| 2012–2017 | US Colomiers | 54 | (182) |
| 2017–2022 | RC Vannes | 122 | (820) |
| 2022–2023 | US Carcassonne | 13 | (38) |
| 2023 | Rugby ATL | 4 | (13) |
| 2023–2024 | Biarritz Olympique | 14 | (45) |
| 2025– | Chicago Hounds | 5 | (42) |
| 2012– | Total | 212 | (1,140) |
- Correct as of 6 April 2025
International career
| Years | Team | Apps | (Points) |
| 2010 | Germany under-18 | | |
| 2012–2019 | Germany | 21 | (85) |
| 2025– | United States | 7 | |
- Correct as of 5 July 2026

Christopher Hilsenbeck (born 10 January 1992) is an American-German rugby union player who plays for the Chicago Hounds in the MLR.

== Career ==
=== Club ===
He began his career at TSV Handschusheim in Germany before joining US Colomiers where he stayed for nine years.

Joining RC Vannes in 2017 he went on to score 820 points in 122 appearances After 5 years he joined fellow Pro D2 side Carcassonne, signing a two-year contract. He left his contract early returning to his home country to finish the 2022/23 season with Rugby ATL in Atlanta.

Before the start of the 2023/24 season he returned to France to play for Biarritz.

=== International ===
He played for Germany in the FIRA-AER Under-18 European Championship in 2010, before making his debut for the senior side in 2012.

He is qualified to play for the United States with World Rugby Eligibility laws.

== Personal life ==
He was born in Northridge, California and grew up in Heidelberg, Germany. He began playing rugby in Heidelberg with Tim Menzel, and both are still have a close relation.

== Honours ==
Chicago Hounds

- All Major League Ruby first team (2025)
