= Noah Brown (rugby union) =

American rugby union player (born 2001)

- Born: 10 January 2001 (age 25) South Bend, Indiana, United States
- Height: 183 cm (6 ft 0 in)
- Weight: 96 kg (212 lb; 15 st 2 lb)

Rugby union career
- Position: Wing
- Current team: Chicago Hounds
Senior career
Years	Team	Apps	(Points)
2024–	Chicago Hounds	28	(37)
- Correct as of 9 December 2025
International career
Years	Team	Apps	(Points)
2024–	United States	1	(0)
- Correct as of 9 December 2025
National sevens team
Years	Team		Comps
2022–	United States		2
- Correct as of 9 December 2025

Noah Brown (born 10 January 2001) is an American rugby union player, currently playing for the Chicago Hounds in Major League Rugby (MLR). His preferred position is wing.

== Early career ==
Brown is from South Bend, Indiana and attended Indiana University. While still at Indiana, Brown represented the USA Falcons at sevens, and made his full United States sevens debut at the 2022 Hong Kong Sevens.

== Professional career ==
Brown was drafted fourth in the first round of the 2023 MLR Draft by the Chicago Hounds. He made his debut for the side in Round 3 of the 2024 Major League Rugby season against Old Glory DC. He remained with the team for the 2025 season, and signed on for the 2026 season in December 2025.

Brown made his debut for the United States national team in November 2024, debuting against Spain.
