= Perry Humphreys =

English rugby union player

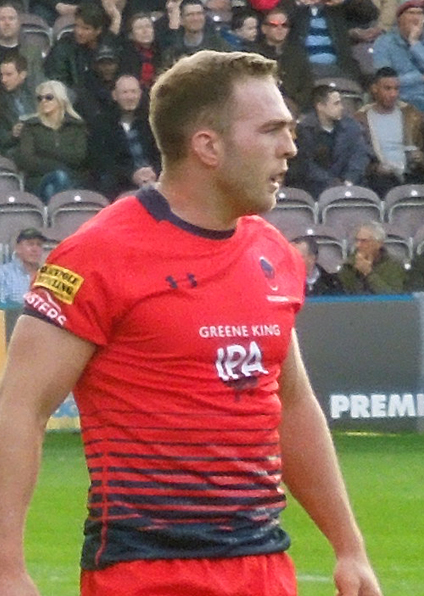
- Full name: Perry Benjamin Humphreys
- Born: 17 October 1994 (age 32) Lincoln, England
- Height: 1.83 m (6 ft 0 in)
- Weight: 94 kg (14 st 11 lb; 207 lb)

Rugby union career
- Position(s): Winger, Fullback
- Current team: Worcester Warriors
Youth career
- 2011-14: Leicester Tigers
- 2014: Nottingham (loan)
- 2014-16: Worcester Warriors
- 2015: Cinderford (loan)
Senior career
Years	Team	Apps	(Points)
2014-2022	Worcester Warriors	106	(120)
- Correct as of 23 November 2018

Perry Humphreys (born 17 October 1994) is an English rugby union player, recently playing with English Premiership side Worcester Warriors. He can play as a winger or fullback.

== Rugby career ==
=== Leicester Tigers ===
Perry Humphreys was a member of the Leicester Tigers academy squad between 2011 and 2014. He made his début for Leicester in the 2013/14 LV Cup, coming off the bench against Ospreys in a 39–16 win.

He also had a short loan spell at Nottingham during this period, appearing in 2 RFU Championship games.

=== Worcester Warriors ===
Perry joined the Worcester academy in the summer of 2014. He was a key member of the Cavaliers side that reached the A league final and won the British and Irish Cup in 2015. During this season he scored 3 tries in the B&I Cup, including a solo score in the 15–13 B&I Cup semi-final win against Leinster A and three tries in seven games in the Aviva A League. Perry also made one appearance for Cinderford in National League 1, making a good impression on début.

Humphreys signed a Worcester first team deal in February 2016. He made his premiership debut for Worcester Warriors against Saracens in the London Double Header at Twickenham. He came off the bench at half time the following week against Gloucester, scoring a solo effort in the corner. He has gone on to score in subsequent gameweeks against Bath and Sale. On 5 October 2022 all Worcester players had their contacts terminated due to the liquidation of the company to which they were contracted.

=== Old Glory DC ===
Perry signed for Old Glory DC to play in Major League Rugby.
