= Ben Sugars =

English rugby union player

- Born: 6 April 2001 (age 25) Leeds, England
- Height: 187 cm (6 ft 2 in)
- Weight: 106 kg (234 lb; 16 st 10 lb)
- University: University of Nottingham

Rugby union career
- Position: Hooker
- Current team: RFC Los Angeles
Senior career
Years	Team	Apps	(Points)
2020	Yorkshire Carnegie	3	(0)
2021–2022	Nottingham	1	(0)
2024	Waratahs	4	(0)
2025–	RFC Los Angeles	0	(0)
- Correct as of 11 December 2024

Ben Sugars (born 6 April 2001) is an English rugby union player, who played for the Waratahs in Super Rugby. His preferred position is hooker.

== Early career ==
Born in Leeds, Sugars attended the University of Nottingham. With dual English and Australian nationality, Sugars moved to Australia in 2023 and joined Randwick.

== Professional career ==
Sugars originally made his debut at hometown side Yorkshire Carnegie before switching to Nottingham while studying in the city. Following moving to Australia, Sugars was called into the Waratahs squad ahead of Round 12 of the 2024 Super Rugby Pacific season, making his debut against the Brumbies. Following the season, he would sign for RFC Los Angeles for the 2025 Major League Rugby season.
