= Theo Fourie =

Australian rugby union player

- Born: 9 November 2000 (age 26) South Africa
- Height: 180 cm (5 ft 11 in)
- Weight: 110 kg (243 lb; 17 st 5 lb)
- School: Rockhampton Grammar School

Rugby union career
- Position: Hooker
Senior career
Years	Team	Apps	(Points)
2023	Melbourne Rebels	1	(0)
2024	NSW Waratahs	3	
2025	Queensland Reds	3	
2026-Present	Chicago Hounds	11	(55)

Theo Fourie (born 9 November 2000) is an Australian rugby union player, who currently plays for the Chicago Hounds. He has previously played for the Melbourne Rebels, New South Wales Waratahs and Queensland Reds His preferred position is hooker.

== Early career ==
Fourie was born and grew up in South Africa, before moving to Australia, where he attended Rockhampton Grammar School in Queensland. After leaving school, Fourie represented Souths, and was named in the Queensland Reds academy squad in 2019. At the end of the 2019 season, Fourie was named in the 2020 Junior Wallabies squad for the annual Junior World Cup, but covid would see the tournament and any international matches for the year cancelled.

== Professional career ==
Fourie first moved to Melbourne, training with the Rebels in 2020, before featuring again in pre-season for the side in 2021 and 2022, although injury restricted him in 2022. He continued to play for Souths during this period. In July 2022, Fourie was confirmed as signing for the Rebels on a full-time basis ahead of the 2023 Super Rugby Pacific season. He made his debut for the Rebels in Round 14 of the 2023 season, coming on as a replacement against the Force. It was to be his only appearance for the Rebels, as he was announced as a signing for the 2024 season at the Waratahs.

== Super Rugby statistics ==
As of 16 July 2023

Season	Team	Games	Starts	Sub	Mins	Tries	Cons	Pens	Drops	Points	Yel	Red
2023	Rebels	1	0	1	2	0	0	0	0	0	0	0
Total		1	0	1	2	0	0	0	0	0	0	0
