= Lucas Rumball =

Canada international rugby union player

- Full name: Lucas James Rumball
- Born: 2 August 1995 (age 31) Markham, Ontario
- Height: 1.88 m (6 ft 2 in)
- Weight: 105 kg (231 lb)

Rugby union career
- Position: Back-row
- Current team: Chicago Hounds
Senior career
Years	Team	Apps	(Points)
2019-	Toronto Arrows	11	(10)
- Correct as of 7 March 2020
International career
Years	Team	Apps	(Points)
2016–present	Canada	35	(20)
- Correct as of 26 September 2019

Lucas James Rumball (born 2 August 1995) is a Canadian rugby union player who generally plays as a back-row. He represents the Canada internationally and currently plays for the Chicago Hounds in Major League Rugby (MLR).

He was included in the Canadian squad for the 2019 Rugby World Cup in Japan, marking his first World Cup appearance.

== Career ==
He made his international debut for Canada against the Uruguay on 6 February 2016. He made his first World Cup match appearance against the Italy on 26 September 2019 in Canada's opening match of the tournament in Pool B. Italy defeated Canada 48–7.

== Club statistics ==
As of 7 March 2020

Season	Team	Games	Starts	Sub	Tries	Cons	Pens	Drops	Points	Yel	Red
MLR 2019	Toronto Arrows	6	6	0	1	0	0	0	5	0	0
MLR 2020	Toronto Arrows	5	4	1	1	0	0	0	5	0	0
Total		11	10	1	2	0	0	0	10	0	0

== Honours ==
Chicago Hounds

- All Major League Ruby Second team (2025)
