= Chicago Hounds (rugby union) =

Professional rugby union team from Chicago, Illinois, US

- Full name: Chicago Hounds
- Founded: 2022; 4 years ago
- Location: Bridgeview, Illinois
- Ground: SeatGeek Stadium (Capacity: 20,000)
- CEO: James English
- Coach: Chris Latham
- Captain: Lucas Rumball
- Most caps: Maclean Jones (57)
- Top scorer: Christopher Hilsenbeck (213)
- Most tries: Dylan Fawsitt (23)
- League: Major League Rugby
- 2026: Champions; 1st in MLR
Team kit

Official website
- www.chicagohounds.com

The Chicago Hounds are an American professional rugby union team based in the Chicago metropolitan area that competes in Major League Rugby (MLR). The team was founded in 2022 and is co-owned by a small group of investors including majority owner Peter Bernick and part-owners (and longtime Chicago rugby players) Matt Satchwell and Phil Groves. Their home stadium is SeatGeek Stadium. Games are broadcast on Fox Chicago Plus.

== History ==
On November 17, 2022, Major League Rugby announced the Chicago Hounds as the newest expansion franchise to begin play in 2023, following the discontinuation of the MLR franchises in Austin and Los Angeles. The Hounds compete in the Eastern Conference. Their first game was against Old Glory DC on February 18, 2023. The Hounds finished their inaugural season ranked 5th among the 6 teams of the Eastern Conference and 9th among the 12 teams then in MLR. Of their three wins that season, two were against the Dallas Jackals in a rivalry match dubbed the Dog Bowl.

In the 2026 Major League Rugby season, the Hounds became the first team in league history to finish with a perfect season, going 10-0-0 enroute to a 35-17 victory over the California Legion in the MLR Championship Final. The 2026 Hounds also set new league records for points-per-game average (46.1), tries-per-game (6.9), points scored (81) and winning margin (36) in a playoff game, points scored in a championship game (35) and total points in a single postseason (94). Chris Latham was named Coach of the Year, with Brock Webster and Lucas Rumball earning Player of the Year and Forward of the Year honors, respectively.

== Home field ==
The team plays its home matches at SeatGeek Stadium in Bridgeview, Illinois.

== Players and personnel ==
=== Current squad ===
The Chicago Hounds squad for the 2026 Major League Rugby season is:

2026 Chicago Hounds squad
**Props**: (United States) **Charlie Abel**; (United States) Koby Baker; (United States) **Fakaʻosi Pifeleti**; (Brazil) **Wilton Rebolo**; (United States) **Jake Turnbull**; (United States) **Luke White**; **Hookers**: (Argentina) Tomás Bekerman *; (Australia) Theo Fourie; (United States) Jackson Zabierek; **Locks**: (United States) **Tomás Casares**; (United States) **Nathan Den Hoedt**; (United States) **Brandon Harvey**; (United States) Malcolm May	**Back row**: (United States) Emmanuel Albert; (Canada) **Mason Flesch**; (Australia) Maclean Jones; (United States) Jake Kinneeveauk; (Canada) **Matt Oworu**; (Canada) **Lucas Rumball** **(c)**; **Scrum-halves**: (United States) **Michael Baska**; (United States) **Ruben de Haas**; (United States) Mathis Demandolx; **Fly-halves**: (South Africa) Reece Botha *; (United States) **Christopher Hilsenbeck**	**Centres**: (England) **Ollie Devoto**; (South Africa) Tiaan Loots *; (United States) **Tavite Lopeti**; **Wings**: (United States) **Noah Brown**; (United States) **Mark O'Keeffe**; (United States) Jason Tidwell; (United States) Peyton Wall; **Fullbacks**: (Chile) **Santiago Videla**; (Canada) **Brock Webster**
**(c)** denotes the team captain. **Bold** denotes internationally capped players. * denotes players qualified to play for United States on residency or dual nationality. Source:

=== Head coaches ===
- (Australia) Sam Harris (2023–2024)
- (Australia) Chris Latham (2025–present)

== Assistant coaches ==
- (Australia) Todd Dammers, Defense, Forwards Coach (2025–present)
- (Ireland) Noel Reid, Attack, Backs Coach (2025–present)
- (England) Jamie Beamish, Head of Performance/Strength & Conditioning (2023–present)

== Records ==
=== Season standings ===
Season	Conference	Regular season										Postseason						
Season	Conference	Pos	Pld	W	D	L	F	A	+/−	BP	Pts	Pld	W	L	F	A	+/−	Result
2023	Western	5th	16	3	0	13	327	497	-170	8	20	-	-	-	-	-	-	Did not qualify
2024	Eastern	3rd	16	8	1	7	454	387	+67	11	45	2	1	1	62	44	+18	Lost Conference Final (NE)
2025	Eastern	2nd	16	11	0	5	422	353	+69	9	52	2	1	1	47	37	+10	Lost Conference Final (NE)
2026	N/A	1st	10	10	0	0	461	252	+209	10	50	2	2	0	94	39	+56	Won MLR Championship (CAL)
Totals			58	32	1	25	1,664	1,489	+175	38	167	6	4	2	203	120	+83	3 postseason appearances

== Honors ==
Major League Rugby
Playoff Appearances	Major League Rugby Championships
2024, 2025, 2026	2026

=== Players ===
Honor	Player Name	Season
MLR Player of the Year	Brock Webster	2026
MLR Rookie of the Year	Peyton Wall	2025
MLR Forward of the Year	Mason Flesch	2026

== 2023 season ==
The Hounds played 16 games in the 2023 season. Home games were played at SeatGeek Stadium. The Hounds had their first-ever regular season victory on March 18 against the Dallas Jackals.

Date	Opponent	Home/Away	Location	Result
February 18	Old Glory DC	Away	Segra Field	Lost, 42–27
March 5	Utah Warriors	Home	SeatGeek Stadium	Lost, 14–10
March 11	Toronto Arrows	Home	SeatGeek Stadium	Lost, 34–31
March 18	Dallas Jackals	Home	SeatGeek Stadium	Won, 24–22
March 26	Seattle Seawolves	Home	SeatGeek Stadium	Lost, 27–5
April 2	Houston SaberCats	Home	SeatGeek Stadium	Lost, 38–21
April 8	New England Free Jacks	Away	Veterans Memorial Stadium	Lost, 31–19
April 16	San Diego Legion	Away	Snapdragon Stadium	Lost, 48–24
April 23	NOLA Gold	Home	SeatGeek Stadium	Lost, 37–24
May 6	Rugby ATL	Away	Silverbacks Park	Lost, 27–12
May 14	New York Ironworkers	Home	SeatGeek Stadium	Lost, 21–20
May 20	Seattle Seawolves	Away	Starfire Sports Complex	Lost, 35–13
May 27	Houston SaberCats	Away	SaberCats Stadium	Lost, 40–33
June 3	San Diego Legion	Home	SeatGeek Stadium	Lost, 14–36
June 10	Utah Warriors	Away	Zions Bank Stadium	Won, 26–24
June 17	Dallas Jackals	Away	Choctaw Stadium	Won, 29–28
