= Bill Meakes =

Australian rugby union player

- Born: William Meakes; 23 February 1991 (age 35) Manly, New South Wales, Australia
- Height: 1.85 m (6 ft 1 in)
- Weight: 93 kg (14 st 9 lb; 205 lb)
- School: St Joseph's College, Hunters Hill

Rugby union career
- Position: Centre
- Current team: RFCLA
Amateur team(s)
Years	Team	Apps	(Points)
2009–2012	Northern Suburbs		
2013	Randwick		
2013–2014	Clifton		
Senior career
Years	Team	Apps	(Points)
2014–2016	Gloucester	45	(25)
2016–2017	Perth Spirit	11	(16)
2018	Melbourne Rising	4	(10)
2020–2021	London Irish	7	(0)
2021–2022	LA Giltinis	27	(25)
2023–2024	Chicago Hounds	30	(10)
2025–	RFCLA	13	(30)
- Correct as of 8 July 2025
Super Rugby
Years	Team	Apps	(Points)
2017	Western Force	14	(5)
2018–2020	Rebels	47	(55)
- Correct as of 24 October 2020
International career
Years	Team	Apps	(Points)
2011	Australia U20	4	(0)
- Correct as of 24 February 2021
National sevens team
Years	Team		Comps
2011–2022	Australia		5
- Correct as of 8 July 2025

Bill Meakes (born 23 February 1991) is an Australian professional rugby union player currently playing for RFCLA in Major League Rugby (MLR). He also has represented Australia in rugby sevens. His usual position is centre.

Meakes was previously contracted to the Western Force in Perth and Gloucester in the English Premiership. He also played for the LA Giltinis and Chicago Hounds in the MLR.

== Early life ==
Meakes was born in Manly on Sydney's Northern Beaches. He attended St Joseph's College, Hunters Hill and during his final year there in 2008 was selected to represent New South Wales at the Australian Schools Rugby Championships.

== Rugby career ==
Meakes played his club rugby at Northern Suburbs and then Randwick. In 2011 he played for the Australia U20 team that finished third at the IRB Junior World Championship, defeating France by 30–17 in the third place playoff. He was also capped for Australia sevens, playing in the 2011–12 IRB Sevens World Series.

In 2013, Meakes moved to England as he played for Clifton RFC, a local rugby union club based in Bristol. In early 2014, Meakes linked up with Gloucester Rugby having played for Clifton since his arrival in the UK as a non-contracted player. He did enough to earn an academy contract for the 2014–15 season. On 15 January 2015, Meakes signed his first professional contract with Gloucester since his move to the English club became permanent.

In 2016, Meakes was released from his contract with Gloucester to make his debut in Super Rugby with Perth-based Western Force from the 2017 season.

Following a year with Western Force, Meakes signed with rivals Melbourne Rebels for both the 2018 and 2019 Super Rugby seasons. He signed a one-year contract extension with the Rebels for the 2020 Super Rugby season.

On 28 October 2020, Meakes returns to England to sign with Premiership side London Irish on a short-term deal until the end of January 2021 as injury cover.

He joined Major League Rugby side LA Giltinis following his time at London Irish. He competed for Australia at the 2022 Rugby World Cup Sevens in Cape Town.

Meakes has never played for the Wallabies.

== Super Rugby statistics ==
As of 12 September 2020

Season	Team	Games	Start	Sub	Mins	T	C	PG	DG	Pts	YC	RC
2017	Force	14	14	0	1074	1	0	0	0	5	0	0
2018	Rebels	16	10	6	959	4	0	0	0	20	2	0
2019	Rebels	16	14	2	1107	5	0	0	0	25	1	0
2020	Rebels	6	6	0	480	1	0	0	0	5	1	0
2020 AU	Rebels	9	6	3	564	1	0	0	0	5	0	0
Total		61	50	11	4184	12	0	0	0	60	4	0

== Honours ==
RFC Los Angeles

- All Major League Ruby first team (2025)
