= Joe Mano =

US international rugby union player

- Full name: Joseph Saitia Mano
- Born: July 2, 1995 (age 31) Hawaii, U.S.
- Height: 5 ft 11 in (180 cm)
- Weight: 200 lb (91 kg)

Rugby union career
- Position: Wing
Senior career
Years	Team	Apps	(Points)
2021–2025	Utah Warriors	54	(195)
2026-	California Legion		
International career
Years	Team	Apps	(Points)
2023–	United States	2	(20)

Joseph Saitia Mano (born July 2, 1995) is a professional rugby union player from American Samoa.

== Early life ==
Born in Hawaii, Mano was named after his elder brother, who died of cancer shortly after Mano's birth. He was brought up in the village of Lauliʻi in American Samoa and attended Fa’asaō Marist High School.

== Rugby career ==
Mano, a winger, represented American Samoa in rugby sevens qualifying matches for the 2020 Tokyo Olympics. He has played Major League Rugby for the Utah Warriors since 2021. His 14 tries for Utah in the 2023 season was matched only by New England's Paula Balekana. In 2023, Mano scored a hat-trick on debut for the United States against Brazil in Villajoyosa, Spain, becoming the first Eagles debutant to achieve the feat in the professional era.

== Honours ==
Utah Warriors

- All Major League Rugby first team (2025)

== See also ==
- List of United States national rugby union players
