= Gonzalo Bertranou =

Argentine rugby union player

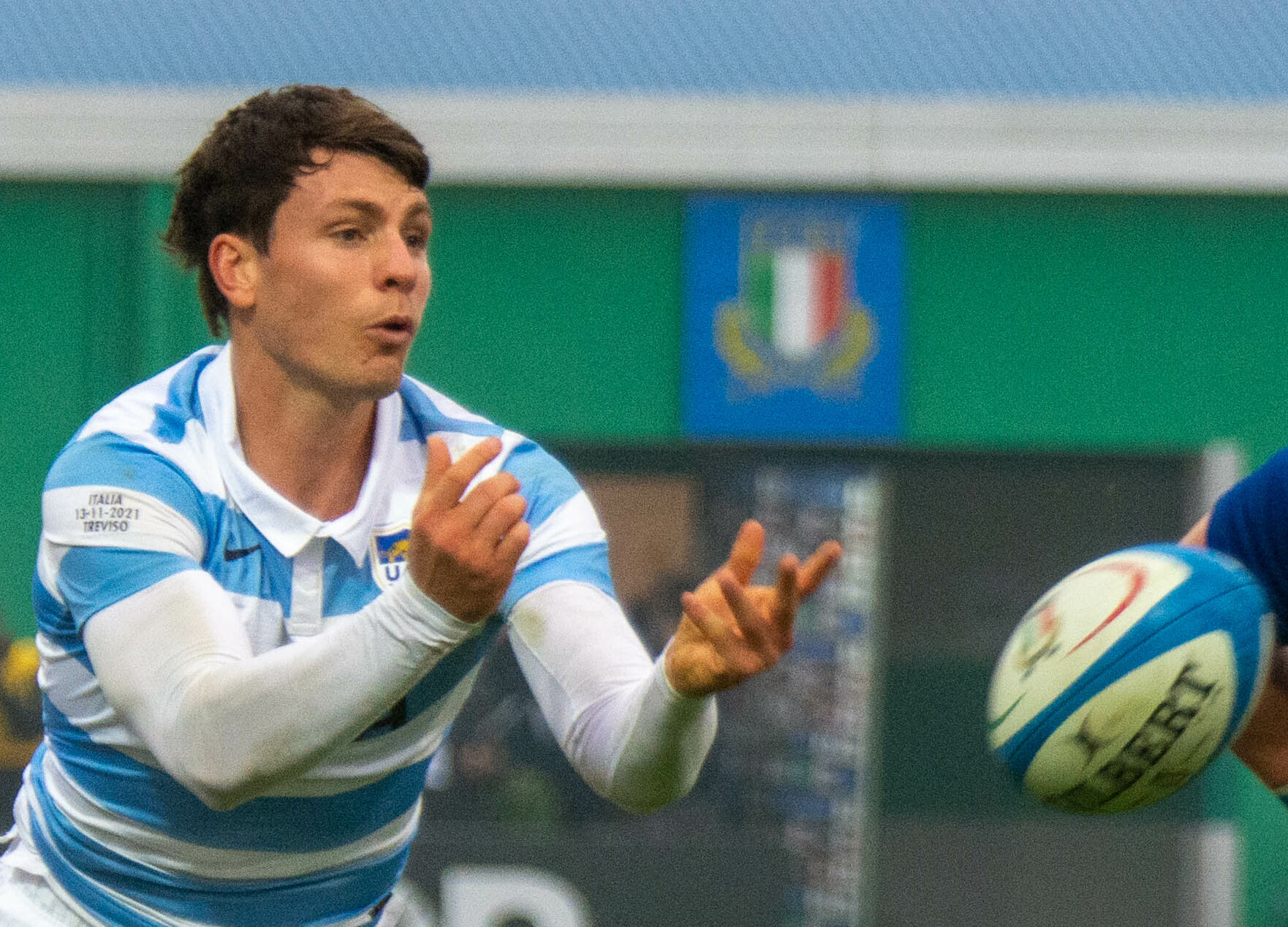
- Born: 31 December 1993 (age 32) Mendoza, Argentina
- Height: 1.74 m (5 ft 9 in)
- Weight: 72 kg (159 lb; 11 st 5 lb)

Rugby union career
- Position: Scrum-half
- Current team: Unattached
Senior career
Years	Team	Apps	(Points)
2016−2020	Jaguares	44	(35)
2019	Jaguares XV	5	(20)
2021–2024	Dragons	29	(0)
2024	Cardiff	3	(0)
- Correct as of 22 September 2024
International career
Years	Team	Apps	(Points)
2015–2017	Argentina XV	9	(20)
2015–	Argentina	63	(30)
- Correct as of 22 September 2024

Gonzalo Bertranou (born 31 December 1993) is an Argentine professional rugby union player who plays as a scrum-half for the Argentina national team.

== Club career ==
Bertranou is a regular player for Argentina Jaguars, since 2013, being currently their captain. He played at 2015 World Rugby Nations Cup, where Argentina Jaguars was runners-up to Romania.

In 2021 Bertranou signed for Welsh side Dragons RFC, leaving the club at the conclusion of the 2023–2024 season. He also had a short spell on loan at Cardiff.

In November 2024, Bertranou signed with Rugby Football Club Los Angeles in California, USA for the 2025 Major League Rugby season. He won the MLR Back of the Year Award in 2025 and 2026.

== International career ==
Bertranou had his first cap for Argentina at the 71–7 win over Paraguay, at 23 May 2015, for the South American Rugby Championship, in Asunción. He played for Argentina in the Rugby World Cup 2019 and Rugby World Cup 2023.

== Honours ==
- Major League Rugby Back of the Year: 2025, 2026
- All Major League Rugby First Team: 2025, 2026
