= 2022 MLR Draft =

General information
- Date(s): August 18, 2022

Overview
- League: Major League Rugby
- First selection: Sam Golla, Lock/Flanker, Dallas Jackals

The 2022 MLR Collegiate Draft was the third annual for rugby union in North America, held on August 18, 2022. The draft was the first MLR draft held after the inaugural Major League Rugby Combine.

== Format ==
The MLR Collegiate Draft 2022 took place on August 18, 2022, and the first portion was aired on FS2.

== Player selections ==
Rd	Pick #	MLR team	Player	Pos.	College
1	1	Dallas Jackals	Sam Golla	Lock/Flanker	California
1	2	New Orleans Gold	Sebastiano Villani	Scrumhalf	St. Bonaventure
1	3	Old Glory DC	Cali Martinez	Prop	University of British Columbia
1	4	Rugby ATL	Seth Purdey	Center	California
1	5	Toronto Arrows	Owain Ruttan	Flanker	University of British Columbia
1	6	New Orleans Gold	Chase Jones	Lock/Flanker	Saint Mary's College
1	7	New Orleans Gold	Trent Rogers	Tighthead Prop	Kutztown University
1	8	Dallas Jackals	Ethan Hager	Wing	University of Victoria
1	9	Utah Warriors	Tai Kauwe	Scrumhalf	Kutztown University
1	10	Rugby ATL	Matt Gelhaus	Lock	Kutztown University
1	11	Utah Warriors	Gabe Kettering	Hooker	Lindenwood
1	12	Seattle Seawolves	Shane Barry	Flyhalf	UCLA
1	13	Rugby United New York	Doyle Hedgepeth	Loosehead Prop	Queens University of Charlotte
2	14	Dallas Jackals	Kyle Fulton	Wing	Arizona
2	15	Old Glory DC	Collin Grosse	Lock/Flanker	Army
2	16	Seattle Seawolves	Sam Wegert	Center	Trinity Western University
2	17	New England Free Jacks	Tomás Casaras	Number Eight	Thomas More University
2	18	Utah Warriors	Greg Janowick	Lock	Tennessee
2	19	Old Glory DC	Jack Manzo	Hooker	California
2	20	Dallas Jackals	Matías Caramuti	Flyhalf	Thomas More University
2	21	San Diego Legion	Oliver Kane	Tighthead Prop	University of San Diego
2	22	Rugby ATL	Jack Shaw	Center/Wing	Bishop's University
2	23	Dallas Jackals	Nolan Buckley	Back Row	UMass Lowell
2	24	Dallas Jackals	Mazvita Nyamarebvu	Center	Arkansas State University
2	25	Seattle Seawolves	Neal Moylett	Back Row	Lindenwood
2	26	Old Glory DC	Alex Balladares	Loosehead Prop	Queens University of Charlotte
3	27	New Orleans Gold	Christian Olney	Wing/Fullback	Ohio State University
3	28	Old Glory DC	Mike Weir	Flyhalf	Dartmouth College
3	29	Rugby United New York	Bill Whiteside	Lock	Lindenwood
3	30	Utah Warriors	Sam Buckley	Tighthead Prop	Lindenwood
3	31	Toronto Arrows	Gabe Casey	Utility Back	University of Victoria
3	32	Toronto Arrows	Denver Fatt	Tighthead Prop	University of Victoria
3	33	Utah Warriors	John DuPree	Openside Flanker	Central Washington University
3	34	San Diego Legion	KoiKoi Nelligan	Hooker	Army
3	35	Rugby ATL	Evan Conlon	Scrumhalf	Lindenwood
3	36	Dallas Jackals	Jason Tidwell	Utility Back	Texas A&M
3	37	New England Free Jacks	Ivan Pula	Prop	Central Washington University
3	38	Seattle Seawolves	James Kuahiwinui	Tighthead Prop	Iowa Central Community College
3	39	Houston SaberCats	Brandon Karnes	Prop	Iowa State University

Source: American Rugby News
