= Coby Miln =

New Zealand rugby union player

- Born: 15 June 1999 (age 27) New Zealand
- Height: 192 cm (6 ft 4 in)
- Weight: 95 kg (209 lb; 14 st 13 lb)
- School: Hamilton Boys' High School

Rugby union career
- Position: First five-eighth
- Current team: Force
Senior career
Years	Team	Apps	(Points)
2022	Munakata Sanix Blues	7	(61)
2025–	Force	1	(2)
- Correct as of 15 March 2025

Coby Miln (born 15 June 1999) is a New Zealand rugby union player, who plays for the Force. His preferred position is first five-eighth.

== Early career ==
Miln is from New Zealand and attended Hamilton Boys' High School. Having not won a contract in New Zealand, he moved to Australia playing club rugby for Randwick. He moved to Warringah in 2024 where he was the top points scorer in the 2024 Shute Shield.

== Professional career ==
Miln played professionally in Japan in 2022, joining Munakata Sanix Blues for the 2022 Japan Rugby League One season. Following his Shute Shield performances, he was named in the Western Force squad for their South African tour in September 2024. In March 2025, he was called into the Force squad for the 2025 Super Rugby Pacific season as an injury replacement, debuting in the Round 5 fixture against the Crusaders.
