= Nathan Den Hoedt =

Australian rugby union player

- Born: 6 January 1997 (age 29) Australia
- Height: 1.99 m (6 ft 6 1/2 in)
- Weight: 114 kg (18.0 st; 251 lb)

Rugby union career
- Position: Lock
Amateur team(s)
| Years | Team | Apps | (Points) |
- Randwick
Senior career
| Years | Team | Apps | (Points) |
| 2018 | Brisbane City | 7 | (5) |
| 2019 | NSW Country Eagles | 5 | (0) |
| 2021–2022 | LA Giltinis | 31 | (10) |
| 2023– | Houston SaberCats | 14 | (0) |
- Correct as of 26 June 2023

Nathan Den Hoedt (born 6 January 1997) is an Australian rugby union player, currently playing for the Houston SaberCats of Major League Rugby (MLR). His preferred position is lock.

== Professional career ==
Den Hoedt signed for Major League Rugby side LA Giltinis ahead of the 2021 Major League Rugby season. He had previously played in the National Rugby Championship for both Brisbane City and NSW Country Eagles.

== Honours ==
Houston SaberCats

- All Major League Ruby first team (2025)
