= 2026 World Rugby Pacific Nations Cup =

Rugby union competition

2026 Pacific Nations Cup
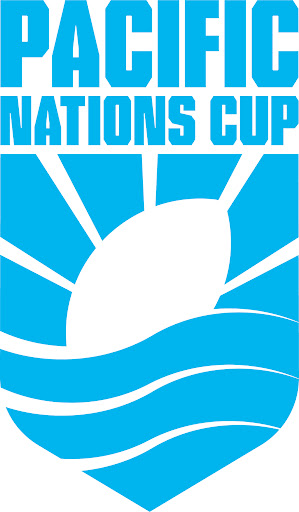

Tournament details
- Host: Japan
- Dates: 12–19 September 2026 (7 days)
- Teams: Canada; Fiji; Japan; United States

Final positions
- Champions: Japan (4th title)
- Runner-up: Fiji
- Third place: Canada
- Fourth place: United States

Tournament statistics
- Matches played: 4
- Tries scored: 31 (7.75 per match)
- Top scorer(s): Sam Greene (28)
- Most tries: Mason Flesch (3)

The 2026 World Rugby Pacific Nations Cup (Note: Known as the Asahi Super Dry Pacific Nations Cup for sponsorship reasons.) was the eighteenth Pacific Nations Cup (PNC) tournament. The tournament featured a condensed version, hosted over two matchdays in Japan between four teams with semi-finals, a third-place game and a final.

Fiji were the defending champions, going into the tournament having won the previous two editions back-to-back (2024, 2025). Japan won the tournament for the fourth time after defeating Fiji 20–15 in the Grand Final. Canada defeated the United States 19–16 for third place.

== Background ==
The 2026 edition of the PNC tournament featured a new four-team format with Japan, Fiji, Canada, and the United States. Semi-finals were held in Ōsaka on 12 September, followed by the third-place play-off and final in Tokyo on 19 September. Defending champions Fiji were aiming for a third consecutive title.

The competition formed an important part of preparations for the 2027 Rugby World Cup in Australia and aligns with World Rugby's revamped international calendar. Although Samoa and Tonga did not compete in this edition, they instead played in the new Nations Cup in July and continue to receive development support.

== Bracket ==
Semi-finals
12 September – Higashiōsaka
Fiji	45
Canada	29
12 September – Higashiōsaka
Japan	63
United States	14

Final
19 September – Tokyo
Fiji	15
Japan	20
Third place play-off
19 September – Tokyo
Canada	19
United States	16

== Matches ==
=== Semi-finals ===
12 September 2026
16:00 JST (UTC+09)

Fiji	45–29	Canada
Try: Salawa 1' c Lomani 5' c Armstrong-Ravula 23' m Ravai 31' c Ikanivere 46' c Murray (2) 51' m, 61' c Con: Armstrong-Ravula (5/7) 2', 6', 32', 47', 62'	Report	Try: Flesch (2) 8' c, 69' c Parry 35' c Tremblay 66' m Con: McMullin (3/4) 8', 36', 70'; Pen: McMullin (1/1) 27'

Hanazono Rugby Stadium, Higashiōsaka
Referee: Katsuki Furuse (Japan)

FB	15	Isikeli Rabitu
RW	14	Joji Nasova
OC	13	Virimi Vakatawa
IC	12	Kalaveti Ravouvou		(substituted off) 58'
LW	11	Manasa Mataele		(substituted off) 62'
FH	10	Isaiah Armstrong-Ravula
SH	9	Frank Lomani		(substituted off) 68'
N8	8	Isoa Tuwai		(substituted off) 62'
BF	7	Motikai Murray
OF	6	Kitione Salawa Jr.
RL	5	Temo Mayanavanua		(substituted off) 58'
LL	4	Mesake Vocevoce
TP	3	Mesake Doge		(substituted off) 68'
HK	2	Tevita Ikanivere (c)		(substituted off) 68'
LP	1	Peni Ravai		(substituted off) 68'
Substitutions:
HK	16	Penaia Cakobau		(substituted on) 68'
PR	17	Meli Tuni		(substituted on) 68'
PR	18	Inoke Ravuiwasa		(substituted on) 68'
LK	19	Isoa Nasilasila		(substituted on) 58'
LK	20	Joseva Tamani	(red card) 74'	(substituted on) 58'
SH	21	Terio Tamani	(yellow card) 78'	(substituted on) 62'
FH	22	Caleb Muntz		(substituted on) 68'
FH	23	Tuidraki Samusamuvodre		(substituted on) 58'
Coach:
Senirusi Seruvakula

FB	15	Takoda McMullin	(substituted off) 9'	(substituted on) 15'
RW	14	Kyle Tremblay
OC	13	Jacob Ince
IC	12	Ben LeSage	(substituted off) 47'	(substituted on) 58'
LW	11	Jamie Armstrong
FH	10	Spencer Jones	(substituted off) 62'
SH	9	Jason Higgins	(substituted off) 62'
N8	8	Lucas Rumball (c)
OF	7	Siôn Parry	(substituted off) 64'
BF	6	Mason Flesch
RL	5	Izzak Kelly	(substituted off) 56'
LL	4	Daragh Doyle
TP	3	Kyle Steeves	(substituted off) 29'
HK	2	Dewald Kotze	(substituted off) 47'
LP	1	Sam Miller	(substituted off) 52'
Substitutions:
HK	16	Austin Creighton	(substituted on) 47'
PR	17	Emerson Prior	(substituted on) 52'
PR	18	Bryce Worden	(substituted on) 29'
LK	19	Barnaby Waddell	(substituted on) 56'
BR	20	Ethan Fryer	(substituted on) 64'
SH	21	Stephen Webb	(substituted on) 62'
FH	22	Cooper Coats	(substituted on) 9'	(substituted off) 15'	(substituted on) 62'
CE	23	Josh McIndoe	(substituted on) 47'	(substituted off) 58'
Coach:
Steve Meehan

Player of the Match:
Motikai Murray (Fiji)

Assistant referees:
Koki Yamauchi (Japan)
Ibuki Tetsuka (Japan)
Television match official:
Graham Cooper (Australia)

Notes:

- Penaia Cakobau, Inoke Ravuiwasa, Terio Tamani and Isoa Tuwai (all Fiji) made their international Test debuts.
- Fiji equaled their record win-streak against Canada following this result (5).

12 September 2026
19:05 JST (UTC+09)

Japan	63–14	United States
Try: Hirose 2' c Stolberg 5' c Riley (2) 9' c, 42' c Harada 16' c Otsuka 41' c Cornelsen 54' c Ha'angana 61' c Greene 64' c Con: Greene (9/9) 3', 5', 9', 17', 42', 43', 55', 61', 65'	Report	Try: Klein 24' c Lopeti 34' c Con: Hilsenbeck (2/2) 25', 35'

Hanazono Rugby Stadium, Higashiōsaka
Attendance: 13,559
Referee: Jordan Way (Australia)

FB	15	Sam Greene
RW	14	Inoke Burua
OC	13	Dylan Riley
IC	12	Yuya Hirose		(substituted off) 57'
LW	11	Kazuma Ueda		(substituted off) 58'
FH	10	Ryūnosuke Itō
SH	9	Naoto Saitō (c)		(substituted off) 57'
N8	8	Jack Cornelsen	(yellow card) 76'
BF	7	Kanji Shimokawa
OF	6	Ben Gunter		(substituted off) 57'
RL	5	Harry Hockings
LL	4	Michael Stolberg		(substituted off) 45'
TP	3	Shuhei Takeuchi		(substituted off) 46'
HK	2	Mamoru Harada		(substituted off) 65'
LP	1	Sojiro Otsuka		(substituted off) 46'
Substitutions:
HK	16	Kenji Sato		(substituted on) 65'
PR	17	Sena Kimura		(substituted on) 46'
PR	18	Takumi Inaba		(substituted on) 46'
BR	19	Esei Ha'angana		(substituted on) 57'
BR	20	Tiennan Costley		(substituted on) 58'
BR	21	Faulua Makisi		(substituted on) 45'
SH	22	Shinobu Fujiwara		(substituted on) 57'
FH	23	Samisoni Tua		(substituted on) 57'
Coach:
Eddie Jones

FB	15	Mitch Wilson
RW	14	Mark O'Keeffe		(substituted off) 61'
OC	13	Tavite Lopeti
IC	12	Dominic Besag
LW	11	Noah Brown
FH	10	Christopher Hilsenbeck		(substituted off) 44'
SH	9	Ruben de Haas		(substituted off) 69'
N8	8	Makeen Alikhan
OF	7	Paddy Ryan
BF	6	Marno Redelinghuys		(substituted off) 61'
RL	5	Nathan Den Hoedt		(substituted off) 46'
LL	4	Jason Damm (c)	(yellow card) 51'
TP	3	Tonga Kofe		(substituted off) 44'	(substituted on) 69'
HK	2	Shilo Klein		(substituted off) 44'
LP	1	Payton Talea		(substituted off) 44'
Substitutions:
HK	16	Joe Taufeteʻe		(substituted on) 44'
PR	17	Fakaʻosi Pifeleti		(substituted on) 44'
PR	18	Alex Maughan		(substituted on) 44'	(substituted off) 69'
LK	19	Sam Golla		(substituted on) 46'
BR	20	Benjamín Bonasso		(substituted on) 61'
SH	21	Michael Baska		(substituted on) 69'
FH	22	Luke Carty		(substituted on) 44'
WG	23	Julian Roberts		(substituted on) 61'
Coach:
Scott Lawrence

Player of the Match:
Mamoru Harada (Japan)

Assistant referees:
Damon Murphy (Australia)
Morgan White (Hong Kong China)
Television match official:
Graham Cooper (Australia)

Notes:

- Japan's 63 points was their record score against the United States, surpassing their previous best of 47 points scored in 1999 and 2025, respectively.
- The 49-point margin was the largest victory Japan had achieved against the United States, surpassing the 26-point record they set in 2025.
- Japan equaled their longest win-streak against the United States (5), dating back to their 28–18 win in the 2015 Rugby World Cup.

=== Third place play-off ===
19 September 2026
16:00 JST (UTC+09)

Canada	19–16	United States
Try: LeSage 10' c Flesch 17' m Kilgour 59' c Con: McMullin (2/3) 11', 60'	Report	Try: Pifeleti 22' c Con: Carty (1/1) 23'; Pen: Carty (3/4) 39', 43', 72'

Chichibunomiya Rugby Stadium, Tokyo
Referee: Katsuki Furuse (Japan)

FB	15	Takoda McMullin
RW	14	Kyle Tremblay
OC	13	Jacob Ince
IC	12	Ben LeSage
LW	11	Jamie Armstrong	(substituted off) 21'
FH	10	Cooper Coats
SH	9	Jesse Kilgour	(substituted off) 69'
N8	8	Lucas Rumball (c)
OF	7	Ethan Fryer	(substituted off) 75'
BF	6	Mason Flesch
RL	5	Izzak Kelly	(substituted off) 54'
LL	4	Daragh Doyle
TP	3	Kyle Steeves	(substituted off) 77'
HK	2	Foster DeWitt	(substituted off) 51'
LP	1	Sam Miller	(substituted off) 52'
Substitutions:
HK	16	Dewald Kotze	(substituted on) 51'
PR	17	Emerson Prior	(substituted on) 52'
PR	18	Bryce Worden	(substituted on) 77'
LK	19	Barnaby Waddell	(substituted on) 54'
BR	20	Cody Nhanala	(substituted on) 75'
SH	21	Stephen Webb	(substituted on) 69'
CE	22	Spencer Jones
FH	23	Liam James	(substituted on) 21'
Coach:
Steve Meehan

FB	15	Mitch Wilson
RW	14	Julian Roberts
OC	13	Dominic Besag
IC	12	Cassh Maluia	(substituted off) 55'
LW	11	Noah Brown
FH	10	Luke Carty
SH	9	Ruben de Haas
N8	8	Makeen Alikhan
OF	7	Lance Williams	(substituted off) 35'
BF	6	Marno Redelinghuys
RL	5	Nathan Den Hoedt	(substituted off) 61'
LL	4	Jason Damm (c)
TP	3	Tonga Kofe	(substituted off) 46'
HK	2	Shilo Klein	(substituted off) 51'	(substituted on) 79'
LP	1	Fakaʻosi Pifeleti	(substituted off) 46'
Substitutions:
HK	16	Joe Taufeteʻe	(substituted on) 51'	(substituted off) 79'
PR	17	Payton Talea	(substituted on) 46'
PR	18	Mason Pedersen	(substituted on) 46'
LK	19	Sam Golla	(substituted on) 61'
BR	20	Benjamín Bonasso	(substituted on) 35'
SH	21	Michael Baska
FH	22	Christopher Hilsenbeck
CE	23	Tavite Lopeti	(substituted on) 55'
Coach:
Scott Lawrence

Player of the Match:
Mason Flesch (Canada)

Assistant referees:
Koki Yamauchi (Japan)
Ibuki Tetsuka (Japan)
Television match official:
Matt Rodden (Hong Kong China)

Notes:

- Cassh Maluia (United States) made his international Test debut.

=== Grand Final ===
19 September 2026
19:05 JST (UTC+09)

Fiji	15–20	Japan
Try: Vakatawa 11' c Ikanivere 26' m Con: Muntz (1/2) 11'; Pen: Armstrong-Ravula (1/1) 65'	Report	Try: Harada 22' c Gunter 59' m Tua 72' m Con: Greene (1/2) 23'; Pen: Greene (1/2) 7'

Chichibunomiya Rugby Stadium, Tokyo
Attendance: 17,421
Referee: Jordan Way (Australia)

FB	15	Isaiah Armstrong-Ravula		(substituted off) 75'
RW	14	Joji Nasova
OC	13	Virimi Vakatawa
IC	12	Tuidraki Samusamuvodre		(substituted off) 60'
LW	11	Isaac Ratuimatavuki-Kneepkens
FH	10	Caleb Muntz
SH	9	Frank Lomani		(substituted off) 73'
N8	8	Elia Canakaivata
BF	7	Motikai Murray
OF	6	Kitione Salawa Jr.
RL	5	Temo Mayanavanua		(substituted off) 22'
LL	4	Mesake Vocevoce
TP	3	Mesake Doge	(yellow card) 19'	(substituted off) 51'
HK	2	Tevita Ikanivere (c)
LP	1	Peni Ravai		(substituted off) 60'
Substitutions:
HK	16	Kavaia Tagivetaua
PR	17	Vilikesa Nairau		(substituted on) 60'
PR	18	Samu Tawake		(substituted on) 51'
BR	19	Isoa Tuwai		(substituted on) 22'
HK	20	Penaia Cakobau
SH	21	Sam Wye		(substituted on) 73'
FB	22	Seta Tamanivalu		(substituted on) 75'
WG	23	Isikeli Rabitu		(substituted on) 60'
Coach:
Senirusi Seruvakula

FB	15	Sam Greene	(substituted off) 68'
RW	14	Inoke Burua
OC	13	Dylan Riley
IC	12	Yuya Hirose	(substituted off) 32'
LW	11	Tomoki Osada	(substituted off) 66'
FH	10	Ryūnosuke Itō
SH	9	Naoto Saitō (c)	(substituted off) 57'
N8	8	Faulua Makisi
BF	7	Kanji Shimokawa
OF	6	Ben Gunter
RL	5	Harry Hockings	(substituted off) 49'
LL	4	Jack Cornelsen
TP	3	Shuhei Takeuchi	(substituted off) 71'
HK	2	Mamoru Harada	(substituted off) 71'
LP	1	Sojiro Otsuka	(substituted off) 66'
Substitutions:
HK	16	Kenji Sato	(substituted on) 71'
PR	17	Sena Kimura	(substituted on) 66'
PR	18	Takumi Inaba	(substituted on) 71'
LK	19	Michael Stolberg	(substituted on) 49'
BR	20	Esei Ha'angana	(substituted on) 68'
BR	21	Tiennan Costley	(substituted on) 66'
SH	22	Shinobu Fujiwara	(substituted on) 57'
FH	23	Samisoni Tua	(substituted on) 32'
Coach:
Eddie Jones

Player of the Match:
Ben Gunter (Japan)

Assistant referees:
Damon Murphy (Australia)
Morgan White (Hong Kong China)
Television match official:
Matt Rodden (Hong Kong China)

Notes:

- This was Japan's first win against Fiji since 2019, and their first Pacific Nations Cup title won in a final.

== Player statistics ==
As of 19 September 2026.

=== Points scorers ===
Pos.	Player	Team	Pts.
1	Sam Greene	Japan	28
2	Isaiah Armstrong-Ravula	Fiji	18
3	Mason Flesch	Canada	15
4	Takoda McMullin	Canada	13
5	Luke Carty	United States	11
6	Motikai Murray	Fiji	10
6	Dylan Riley	Japan	10
6	Tevita Ikanivere	Fiji	10
6	Mamoru Harada	Japan	10
10	Twenty players		5

=== Try scorers ===
Pos.	Player	Team	Tries
1	Mason Flesch	Canada	3
2	Motikai Murray	Fiji	2
2	Dylan Riley	Japan	2
2	Tevita Ikanivere	Fiji	2
2	Mamoru Harada	Japan	2
6	Twenty players		1

== Participants ==
Team	Coach	Captain	World Rugby Ranking	
Team	Coach	Captain	Start (Note: As of 7 September 2026)	End (Note: As of 21 September 2026)
Canada	Steve Meehan	Lucas Rumball	24th	22nd
Fiji	Senirusi Seruvakula	Tevita Ikanivere	9th	10th
Japan	Eddie Jones	Naoto Saitō	12th	9th
United States	Scott Lawrence	Jason Damm	14th	15th

=== Squads ===
Caps and ages are as of the first match of the tournament (12 September 2026).

==== Canada ====
On 25 August 2026, Canada announced a 32-player squad for their September tour of Japan, including a one-off test match against Japan and their Pacific Nations Cup campaign.

Player	Position	Date of birth (age)	Caps	Club/province
Austin Creighton	Hooker	6 June 2000 (aged 26)	3	(Brazil) Cobras Brasil Rugby
Foster DeWitt	Hooker	26 May 1996 (aged 30)	8	(Uruguay) Peñarol
Dewald Kotze	Hooker	14 June 1997 (aged 29)	16	(England) Rotherham Titans
Sam Miller	Prop	5 June 2002 (aged 24)	8	(Portugal) Benfica
Emerson Prior	Prop	4 June 1998 (aged 28)	9	(Canada) Westshore
Kyle Steeves	Prop	31 January 2000 (aged 26)	9	(Australia) Hunter Wildfires
Sam Turner	Prop	31 March 1998 (aged 28)	0	(England) Clifton Rugby
Bryce Worden	Prop	18 July 1995 (aged 31)	1	(Australia) West Harbour
Callum Botchar	Lock	3 October 1997 (aged 28)	10	(Canada) James Bay
Ryan Cozens	Lock	7 September 2004 (aged 22)	0	(England) Reading Rams
Daragh Doyle	Lock	21 September 2005 (aged 20)	3	(Ireland) Clontarf
Izzak Kelly	Lock	9 April 2000 (aged 26)	17	(Portugal) Benfica
Barnaby Waddell	Lock	19 December 2001 (aged 24)	3	(England) Camborne
Mason Flesch	Back row	18 November 1999 (aged 26)	24	(United States) Chicago Hounds
Ethan Fryer	Back row	27 May 2002 (aged 24)	5	(Uruguay) Peñarol
Cody Nhanala	Back row	30 October 2001 (aged 24)	3	(Canada) UBC Thunderbirds
Sion Parry	Back row	29 October 1998 (aged 27)	20	(Wales) Ebbw Vale
Lucas Rumball	Back row	2 August 1995 (aged 31)	68	(United States) Chicago Hounds
Jason Higgins	Scrum-half	28 March 1995 (aged 31)	31	(Ireland) Cork Constitution
Jesse Kilgour	Scrum-half	17 December 2004 (aged 21)	2	(Canada) Aurora Barbarians
Stephen Webb	Scrum-half	15 December 2005 (aged 20)	3	(Canada) UBC Thunderbirds
Cooper Coats	Fly-half	6 October 1996 (aged 29)	24	(Canada) UVIC Vikes
Liam James	Fly-half	21 September 1996 (aged 29)	3	(Canada) UBC Old Boys Ravens
Jacob Ince	Centre	14 September 2002 (aged 23)	2	(New Zealand) Taranaki
Spencer Jones	Centre	17 July 1997 (aged 29)	18	(New Zealand) Hamilton Old Boys
Ben LeSage	Centre	24 November 1995 (aged 30)	40	(United States) New England Free Jacks
Josh McIndoe	Centre	4 August 2005 (aged 21)	2	(Canada) UVIC Vikes
Takoda McMullin	Wing	1 May 2002 (aged 24)	8	(Canada) Bayside Sharks
Isaac Olson	Wing	1 July 2000 (aged 26)	8	(Canada) Castaway Wanderers
Kyle Tremblay	Wing	27 August 1999 (aged 27)	8	(Canada) Bayside Sharks
Jamie Armstrong	Fullback	16 December 2001 (aged 24)	1	(Canada) Ottawa Irish
Jack Gore	Fullback	15 November 2007 (aged 18)	0	(Canada) Laurier Golden Hawks

==== Fiji ====
Fiji announced a 31-man squad in on 25 August 2026 ahead of the tournament.

Player	Position	Date of birth (age)	Caps	Club/province
Penaia Cakobau	Hooker	28 December 1993 (aged 32)	0	(Fiji) Fijian Drua
Tevita Ikanivere	Hooker	6 September 1999 (aged 27)	34	(Japan) Tochigi Honda Heat
Kavaia Tagivetaua	Hooker	5 June 2003 (aged 23)	1	(Fiji) Fijian Drua
Mesake Doge	Prop	1 April 1993 (aged 33)	28	(Fiji) Fijian Drua
Vilikesa Nairau	Prop	6 March 2002 (aged 24)	0	(England) Saracens
Livai Natave	Prop	20 April 1999 (aged 27)	9	(England) Worcester Warriors
Peni Ravai	Prop	16 June 1990 (aged 36)	55	(Fiji) Fijian Drua
Inoke Ravuiwasa	Prop	4 September 1996 (aged 30)	0	(Fiji) Suva
Samu Tawake	Prop	11 September 1996 (aged 30)	16	(Fiji) Fijian Drua
Meli Tuni	Prop	29 June 2000 (aged 26)	3	(Fiji) Fijian Drua
Temo Mayanavanua	Lock	9 November 1997 (aged 28)	36	(Fiji) Fijian Drua
Isoa Nasilasila	Lock	13 September 1999 (aged 26)	32	(Japan) JR East Green Warriors Tokatsu
Joseva Tamani	Lock	2 April 1997 (aged 29)	2	(Fiji) Fijian Drua
Mesake Vocevoce	Lock	16 May 2003 (aged 23)	18	(Fiji) Fijian Drua
Elia Canakaivata	Back row	12 July 1996 (aged 30)	22	(England) Sale Sharks
Motikai Murray	Back row	8 August 2003 (aged 23)	5	(Fiji) Fijian Drua
Kitione Salawa Jr.	Back row	23 May 2001 (aged 25)	14	(Fiji) Fijian Drua
Isoa Tuwai	Back row	4 June 2002 (aged 24)	0	(Fiji) Fijian Drua
Philip Baselala	Scrum-half	14 September 2004 (aged 21)	4	(Fiji) Fijian Drua
Frank Lomani	Scrum-half	18 April 1996 (aged 30)	46	(Fiji) Fijian Drua
Terio Tamani	Scrum-half	6 July 1994 (aged 32)	0	Fiji Sevens
Sam Wye	Scrum-half	11 November 2000 (aged 25)	7	(New Zealand) North Harbour
Isaiah Armstrong-Ravula	Fly-half	7 January 2004 (aged 22)	20	(Fiji) Fijian Drua
Caleb Muntz	Fly-half	30 October 1999 (aged 26)	23	(France) Provence
Maleli Nauvasi	Centre	3 December 2006 (aged 19)	0	(Fiji) Fijian Drua
Tuidraki Samusamuvodre	Centre	16 February 1998 (aged 28)	2	(Fiji) Fijian Drua
Virimi Vakatawa	Centre	1 May 1992 (aged 34)	1	(Fiji) Fijian Drua
Kemu Valetini	Centre	26 August 1994 (aged 32)	5	(Fiji) Fijian Drua
Manasa Mataele	Wing	27 November 1996 (aged 29)	3	(Fiji) Fijian Drua
Joji Nasova	Wing	9 June 2000 (aged 26)	3	(Fiji) Fijian Drua
Isaac Ratuimatavuki-Kneepkens	Wing	19 July 1999 (aged 27)	0	(Australia) Southern Districts
Kalaveti Ravouvou	Wing	6 June 1998 (aged 28)	17	(England) Bristol Bears
Isikeli Rabitu	Fullback	22 January 2005 (aged 21)	1	(Fiji) Fijian Drua

==== Japan ====
On 9 September, Japan named a 30-player squad ahead of their World Rugby Pacific Nations Cup.

Player	Position	Date of birth (age)	Caps	Club/province
Mamoru Harada	Hooker	15 April 1999 (aged 27)	17	(Japan) Toshiba Brave Lupus
Kenji Sato	Hooker	4 January 2003 (aged 23)	11	(Japan) Saitama Wild Knights
Sho Furuhata	Prop	10 December 1996 (aged 29)	1	(Japan) Saitama Wild Knights
Kanato Hirano	Prop	8 February 2000 (aged 26)	0	(Japan) Tochigi Honda Heat
Takumi Inaba	Prop	24 July 2002 (aged 24)	1	(Japan) Shizuoka Blue Revs
Sena Kimura	Prop	24 June 1999 (aged 27)	3	(Japan) Tochigi Honda Heat
Sojiro Otsuka	Prop	5 July 2004 (aged 22)	6	(Japan) Toshiba Brave Lupus
Shuhei Takeuchi	Prop	9 December 1997 (aged 28)	29	(Japan) Tokyo Sungoliath
Ruan Botha	Lock	10 January 1992 (aged 34)	0	(Japan) Kubota Spears
Jack Cornelsen	Lock	13 October 1994 (aged 31)	35	(Japan) Saitama Wild Knights
Harry Hockings	Lock	28 July 1998 (aged 28)	8	(Japan) Tokyo Sungoliath
Michael Stolberg	Lock	27 March 1992 (aged 34)	4	(Japan) Toshiba Brave Lupus
Shin Takeuchi	Lock	7 August 2000 (aged 26)	0	(Japan) Urayasu D-Rocks
Tiennan Costley	Back row	14 June 2000 (aged 26)	17	(Japan) Kobe Steelers
Ben Gunter	Back row	24 October 1997 (aged 28)	23	(Japan) Saitama Wild Knights
Esei Ha'angana	Back row	21 April 1999 (aged 27)	2	(Japan) Urayasu D-Rocks
Faulua Makisi	Back row	20 February 1997 (aged 29)	26	(Japan) Kubota Spears
Kanji Shimokawa	Back row	17 January 1999 (aged 27)	27	(Japan) Tokyo Sungoliath
Shinobu Fujiwara	Scrum-half	8 February 1999 (aged 27)	19	(Japan) Kubota Spears
Naoto Saitō	Scrum-half	26 August 1997 (aged 29)	34	(Japan) Tokyo Sungoliath
Ryūnosuke Itō	Fly-half	10 November 2004 (aged 21)	6	(Japan) Meiji University
Samisoni Tua	Fly-half	24 May 1995 (aged 31)	6	(Japan) Urayasu D-Rocks
Yuya Hirose	Centre	7 April 2001 (aged 25)	8	(Japan) Kubota Spears
Tomoki Osada	Centre	25 November 1999 (aged 26)	26	(Japan) Saitama Wild Knights
Dylan Riley	Centre	2 May 1997 (aged 29)	44	(Japan) Saitama Wild Knights
Inoke Burua	Wing	30 May 1999 (aged 27)	1	(Japan) Kobe Steelers
Haruto Kida	Wing	9 April 1999 (aged 27)	4	(Japan) Kubota Spears
Kazuma Ueda	Wing	4 December 2002 (aged 23)	7	(Japan) Kobe Steelers
Sam Greene	Fullback	16 August 1994 (aged 32)	8	(Japan) JR East Green Warriors Tokatsu
Takuro Matsunaga	Fullback	13 August 1998 (aged 28)	11	(Japan) Toshiba Brave Lupus Tokyo

==== United States ====
On 31 August 2026, a 31-man squad was announced for the Pacific Nations Cup.

Player	Position	Date of birth (age)	Caps	Club/province
Shilo Klein	Hooker	4 May 1999 (aged 27)	9	Unattached
Campbell Robb	Hooker	10 September 2002 (aged 24)	0	Unattached
Joe Taufeteʻe	Hooker	4 October 1992 (aged 33)	36	(United States) California Legion
Tonga Kofe	Prop	2 February 1996 (aged 30)	9	(United States) California Legion
Alex Maughan	Prop	4 April 1995 (aged 31)	9	Unattached
Ma'ake Muti	Prop	1 August 1997 (aged 29)	0	(United States) California Legion
Mason Pedersen	Prop	18 September 1996 (aged 29)	2	(United States) Seattle Seawolves
Fakaʻosi Pifeleti	Prop	19 August 1996 (aged 30)	1	(United States) Chicago Hounds
Payton Telea-Ilalio	Prop	17 August 1998 (aged 28)	7	Unattached
Jason Damm (c)	Lock	26 January 1995 (aged 31)	18	(United States) California Legion
Nathan Den Hoedt	Lock	6 January 1997 (aged 29)	3	(United States) Chicago Hounds
Sam Golla	Lock	7 May 1999 (aged 27)	8	Unattached
Brandon Harvey	Lock	13 June 2002 (aged 24)	4	(United States) Chicago Hounds
Makeen Alikhan	Back row	10 October 2001 (aged 24)	8	Unattached
Benjamín Bonasso	Back row	1 June 1997 (aged 29)	13	(United States) Old Glory DC
Marno Redelinghuys	Back row	6 January 1993 (aged 33)	9	(United States) Seattle Seawolves
Paddy Ryan	Back row	13 October 1998 (aged 27)	21	(United States) Seattle Seawolves
Lance Williams	Back row	19 February 1993 (aged 33)	1	(United States) California Legion
Michael Baska	Scrum-half	17 November 1994 (aged 31)	6	(United States) Chicago Hounds
Ruben de Haas	Scrum-half	9 October 1998 (aged 27)	47	(United States) Chicago Hounds
Ethan McVeigh	Scrum-half	14 December 1999 (aged 26)	9	(United States) New England Free Jacks
Luke Carty	Fly-half	24 September 1997 (aged 28)	27	Unattached
Davy Cotzer	Fly-half	5 February 1999 (aged 27)	0	(United States) Seattle Seawolves
Christopher Hilsenbeck	Fly-half	10 January 1992 (aged 34)	8	(United States) Chicago Hounds
Dominic Besag	Centre	6 August 2004 (aged 22)	21	(United States) Saint Mary's
Tavite Lopeti	Centre	20 November 1998 (aged 27)	29	(United States) Chicago Hounds
Cassh Maluia	Centre	3 October 1998 (aged 27)	0	(United States) California Legion
Tom Pittman	Centre	8 April 1999 (aged 27)	3	Unattached
Noah Brown	Wing	10 January 2001 (aged 25)	1	(United States) Chicago Hounds
Mark O'Keeffe	Wing	13 September 1993 (aged 32)	5	(United States) Chicago Hounds
Julian Roberts	Wing	11 May 2000 (aged 26)	3	Unattached
Mitch Wilson	Fullback	15 April 1996 (aged 30)	22	(United States) New England Free Jacks

== See also ==
- 2026 men's rugby union internationals
- 2026 Nations Championship
- 2026 World Rugby Nations Cup
