= Cassh Maluia =

Former American football player (born 1998)

No. 46
- Position: Linebacker

Personal information
- Born: October 3, 1998 (age 28); Compton, California, U.S.
- Listed height: 6 ft 0 in (1.83 m)
- Listed weight: 248 lb (112 kg)

Career information
- High school: Paramount (Paramount, California)
- College: Wyoming (2016–2019)
- NFL draft: 2020: 6th round, 204th overall pick

Career history
- New England Patriots (2020); Tennessee Titans (2021)*; American Raptors (2023); Chicago Hounds (2024-present)
- * Offseason or practice squad member only
- Stats at Pro Football Reference

Cassh Maluia (born October 3, 1998) is an American former professional football player who is a professional rugby player with the Chicago Hounds. He played in the National Football League (NFL) as a linebacker.

Maluia played college football for the Wyoming Cowboys, and was selected by the New England Patriots in the sixth round of the 2020 NFL draft.

== College football ==
Maluia grew up in Compton, California and signed with Wyoming, the first school to offer him a football scholarship, out of high school. As a sophomore, Maluia recorded 74 tackles. In his senior season in 2019, he had 61 tackles (including seven for a loss), half a sack, and two interceptions while starting at weak-side linebacker. He earned honorable mention all-Mountain West Conference honors. In his career at Wyoming, Maluia had 197 tackles and 16.5 tackles for loss.

== American football ==
=== New England Patriots ===
Maluia was selected by the New England Patriots in the sixth round of the 2020 NFL draft with the 204th overall pick. He was waived on September 5, 2020, and signed to the practice squad the next day. He was promoted to the active roster the following day. He was waived on November 10, 2020, and re-signed to the practice squad two days later. He was elevated to the active roster on November 14 and December 28 for the team's weeks 10 and 16 games against the Baltimore Ravens and Buffalo Bills, and reverted to the practice squad after each game. On January 2, 2021, Maluia was promoted to the active roster. He was waived after the season on March 23, 2021.

Maluia re-signed with the Patriots on August 7, 2021, but was waived on August 24, 2021. Maluia then signed with the Tennessee Titans on August 26, 2021, but was waived on August 29, 2021.

== Rugby ==
=== Professional ===
Maluia switched football codes in 2023 to play rugby for the American Raptors in the Super Rugby Americas league. In 2024, Maluia signed with Major League Rugby's Chicago Hounds as an outside back.

=== International ===
Maluia debuted for the United States men's national rugby union team in 2026 at the 2026 World Rugby Pacific Nations Cup.
