= United States men's national rugby union team =

Men's rugby union team

United States
- Nickname: Eagles
- Emblem: Bald eagle
- Union: USA Rugby
- Head coach: Scott Lawrence
- Captain: AJ MacGinty
- Most caps: Todd Clever (76)
- Top scorer: Mike Hercus (465)
- Top try scorer: Vaea Anitoni (26)
- Home stadium: Various
First colors	Second colors

World Rugby ranking
- Current: 14 (as of July 6, 2026)
- Highest: 12 (2018, 2019)
- Lowest: 20 (2008, 2022)

First international
- United States 8–12 Australia (California, United States; November 16, 1912)

Biggest win
- United States 91–0 Barbados (California, United States; July 1, 2006)

Biggest defeat
- England 106–8 United States (London, England, August 21, 1999)

World Cup
- Appearances: 9 (first in 1987)
- Best result: Pool stage (1987, 1991, 1999, 2003, 2007, 2011, 2015, 2019)
Medal record
Men's rugby
Gold medal – first place	1920 Antwerp	Team
Gold medal – first place	1924 Paris	Team
- Website: usa.rugby

The United States men's national rugby union team, nicknamed the Eagles, represents the United States in men's international rugby union competitions. USA Rugby is the national governing body for the sport of rugby union in the United States, and is a member of Rugby Americas North, one of six regional governing bodies under World Rugby. Until rugby returned to Olympic competition, with sevens at the 2016 Rio Games, the United States was the reigning Olympic rugby champion, having won gold at the 1920 and 1924 Summer Olympics.

As of July 2026, the men's Eagles are ranked 14th in the world by the World Rugby Rankings. Their previous highest ranking was 12th, achieved ahead of the 2019 World Cup. The team's lowest ranking was 20th, first following a winless campaign in the 2008 Churchill Cup and second for a single week in 2022 during the 2023 World Cup qualifying tournament.

The highest profile tournament in which the men's Eagles play is the Rugby World Cup. The men's Eagles have played in all but two Rugby World Cups since the tournament began in 1987. The United States is hosting the 2031 Rugby World Cup.

The United States currently compete in the Pacific Nations Cup every Summer. Previously, the U.S. has competed in the now-defunct Churchill Cup and the Pan American Championship. In April 2015, USA Rugby announced the creation of a new, annual International Championship to be contested among the top-6 ranked rugby nations in the Americas: Argentina, Brazil, Canada, Chile, Uruguay and the United States. The contest was named the Americas Rugby Championship and began in 2016 with the final tournament taking place in 2019. The United States won the 2017 Americas Rugby Championship after drawing with Argentina XV. It was the United States' first 15-a-side rugby union title in over 90 years.

== History ==
=== Early years: 1872–1913 ===
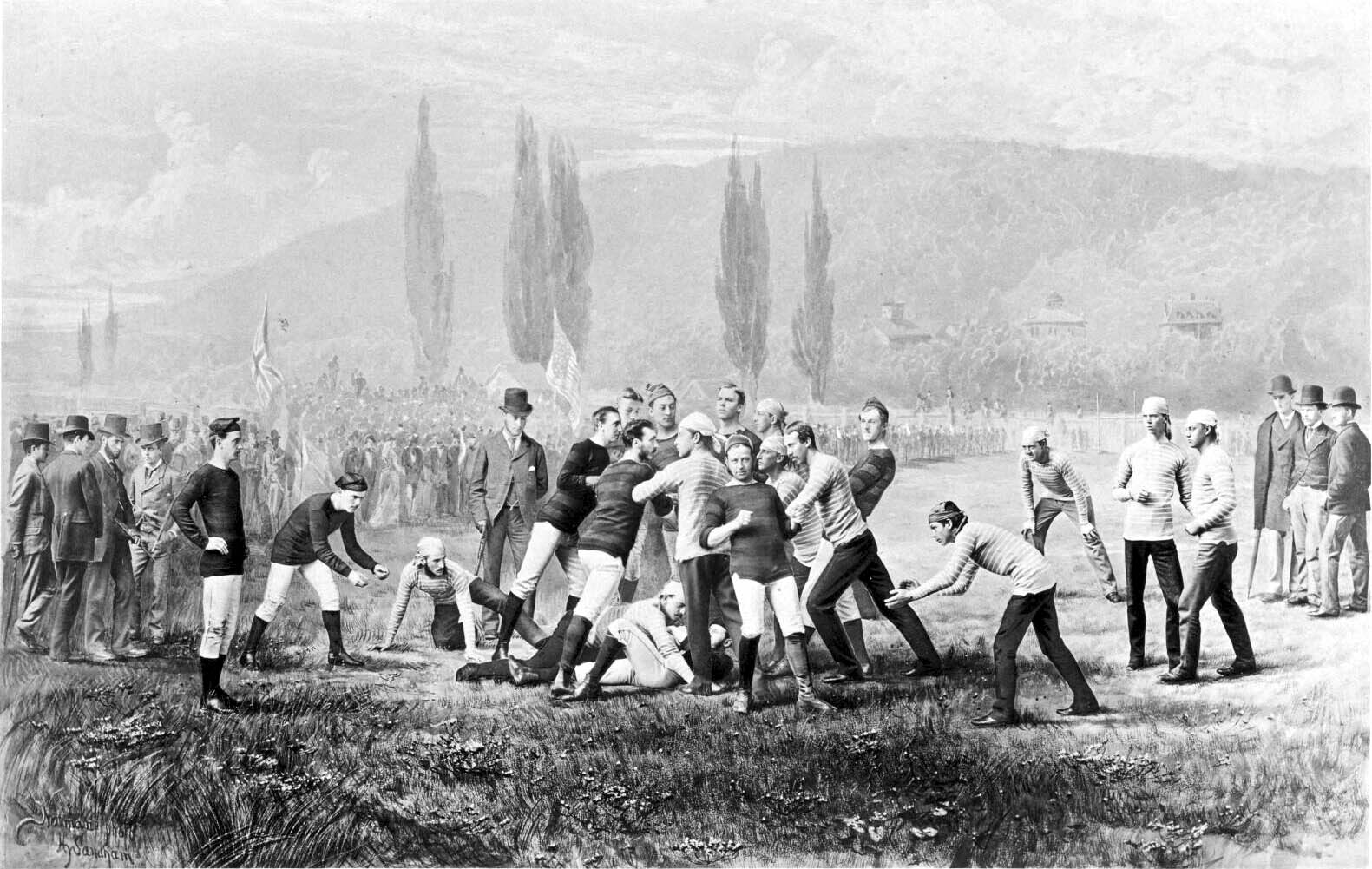
The Harvard–McGill game of 1874

Informal football games such as rugby became popular in the United States in the mid-19th century. Rugby union was played as early as 1872 among rugby clubs in the San Francisco Bay Area composed mainly of British expatriates. On December 2, 1882, the first Californian representative rugby team to play an outside opponent, took on a group of rugby-playing ex-Britons, who called themselves the Phoenix Rugby Club of San Francisco. California lost to the Phoenix club 7–4.

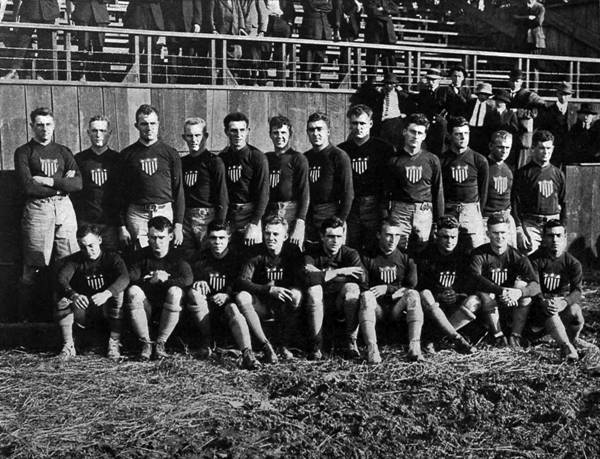
The USA side that played Australia at California Field during the Wallabies 1912 tour of Canada and the U.S.

The first recorded rugby game in the U.S. was played in May 1874 when local Harvard University hosted Canadian McGill University. The game sparked an interest on college campuses nationwide. In 1876 Yale, Harvard, Princeton, and Columbia formed the Intercollegiate Football Association, which largely used the rugby code. In 1886 Harvard's Oscar Shafter Howard introduced these rules to the campus of the University of California, Berkeley.

American football was fierce, and as injuries mounted, the public became alarmed at its brutalities and President Theodore Roosevelt threatened to outlaw the sport. Beginning in 1906, rugby union became the game of choice at Stanford University, University of California, Berkeley and several other colleges in California. Rugby's popularity, however, was short lived, and the sport had died out by the outbreak of World War I.

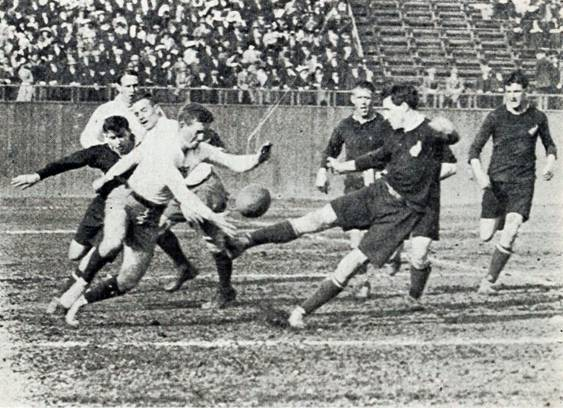
USA vs All Blacks Test match during the 1913 New Zealand tour of North America

A California student team toured Australia and New Zealand in 1910, and invited their hosts to return the visit. Australia obliged by touring North America in 1912, and the U.S. national team played its first international match on November 16, 1912 against Australia in Berkeley, California. The visitors won 12–8. A year later, the U.S. hosted New Zealand at the same venue on November 15, 1913, but the Kiwis ran away with the contest 51–3 in front of 10,000 spectators.

=== Olympic Gold: 1920 and 1924 ===
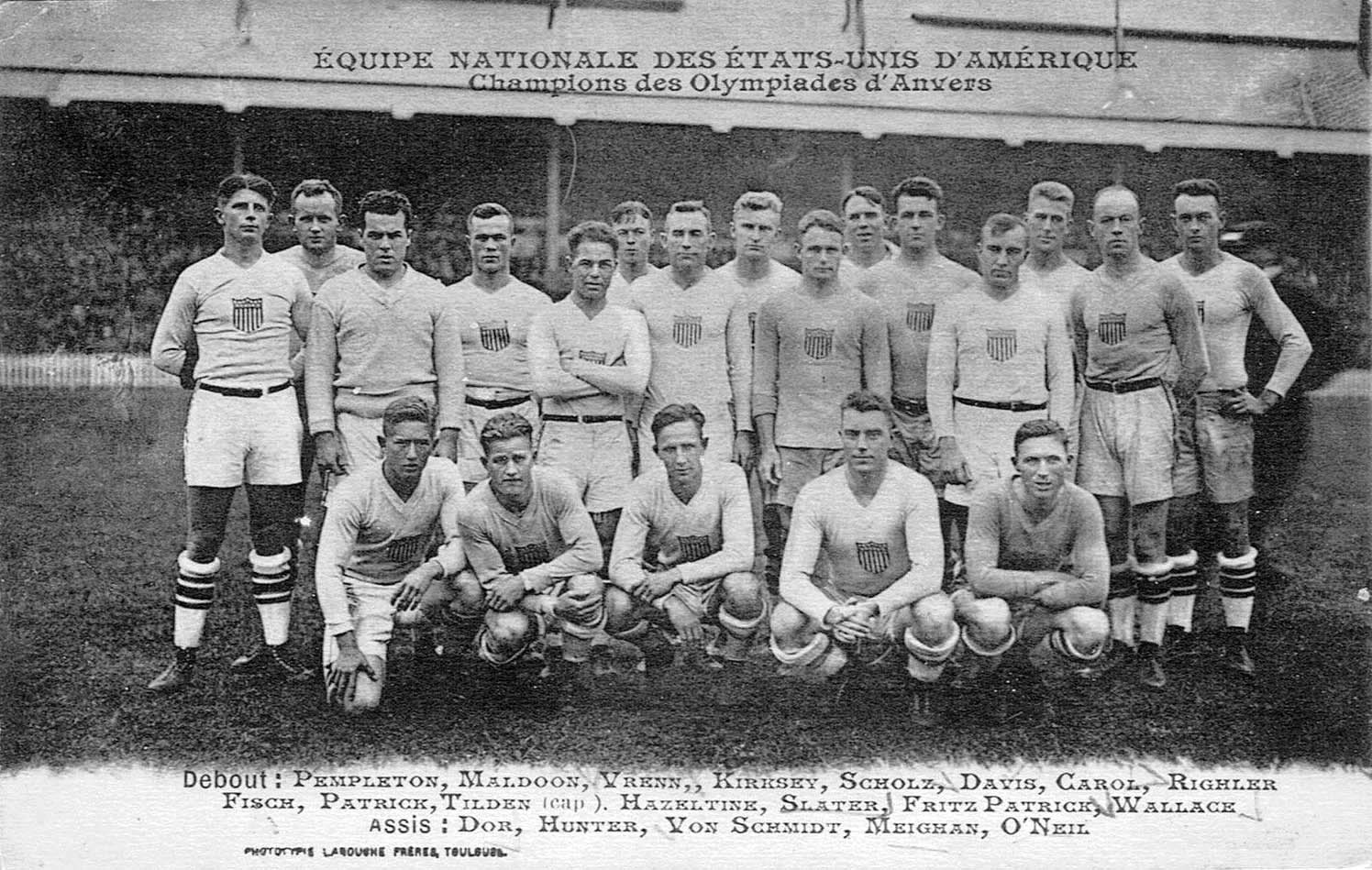
The U.S. rugby team for the October 1920 test match vs France

Following the end of World War I, the U.S. participated in the Inter-Allied Games where they defeated Romania, before losing to a France XV side, a match in which no caps were awarded. Rugby union had not been played competitively in most of the U.S. for more than a decade before the 1920 Olympics. The U.S. Olympic committee decided that because "California is the only state playing Rugby in the US, the Committee will give sanction but no financial aid". Harry Maloney, coach at Stanford University and then-president of the California rugby union, assembled a mostly California-based team, with seven players from Stanford, six from the University of California, Berkeley and five from Santa Clara University. The Olympic Games Committee of the Amateur Athletic Union paid the expenses to transport the team from California to the games in Antwerp. By the time the US Rugby team arrived in Europe, Czechoslovakia and Romania had withdrawn from the competition. France and the U.S. were the only teams left to compete. The U.S. won a shock 8–0 victory over France to earn the gold medal.

The stunned French suggested that the U.S. team tour France, which they did; winning three out of the four matches they played. Between 1920 and 1924, however, rugby union virtually disappeared once again in the U.S., as American football soared in popularity.

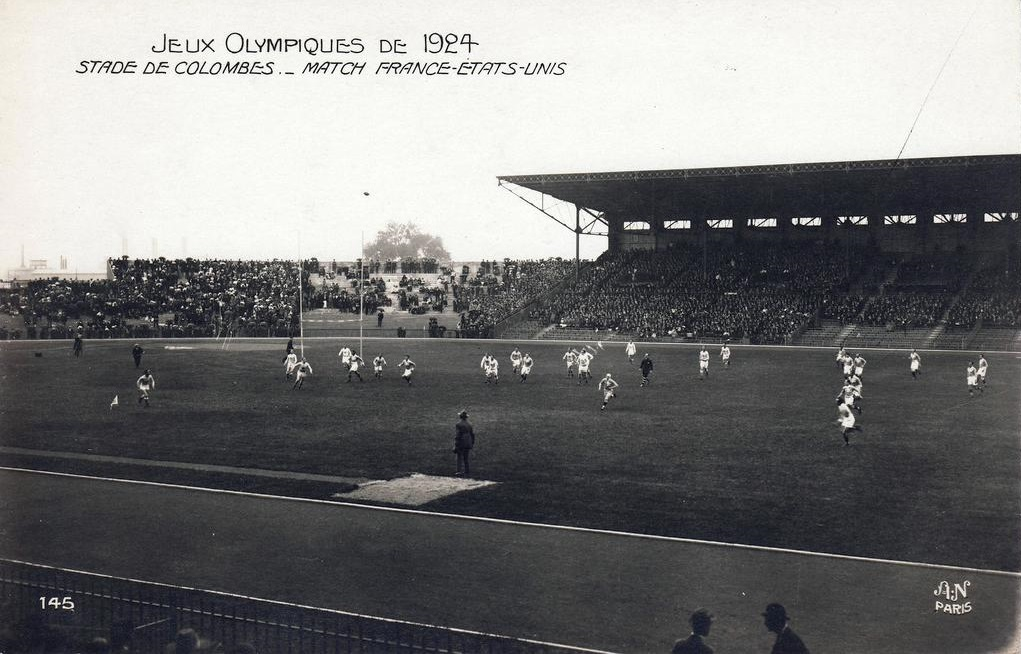
France vs U.S. rugby match during the 1924 Summer Olympics

The 1924 Paris Olympics caused France to challenge the U.S. to defend its title. Once again, the U.S. Olympic Committee granted permission but no funds. Nonetheless, seven players of the 1920 team dusted off their boots, raised $20,000, found 15 new players including some American football players who had never played in a rugby union match. The assembled U.S. team was again based heavily from Northern California, with 9 Stanford alumni, 5 from Santa Clara, and 3 from Cal. The team headed for England to play some tuneup matches, where they were beaten four times.

The French Olympic Committee (FOC) had scheduled the rugby event to kick off the 1924 Paris Games at Colombes Stadium in Paris. Romania and the U.S. were expected to provide only token opposition for the European champions. On Sunday, May 11, the U.S. defeated Romania 39 to 0, including nine tries.

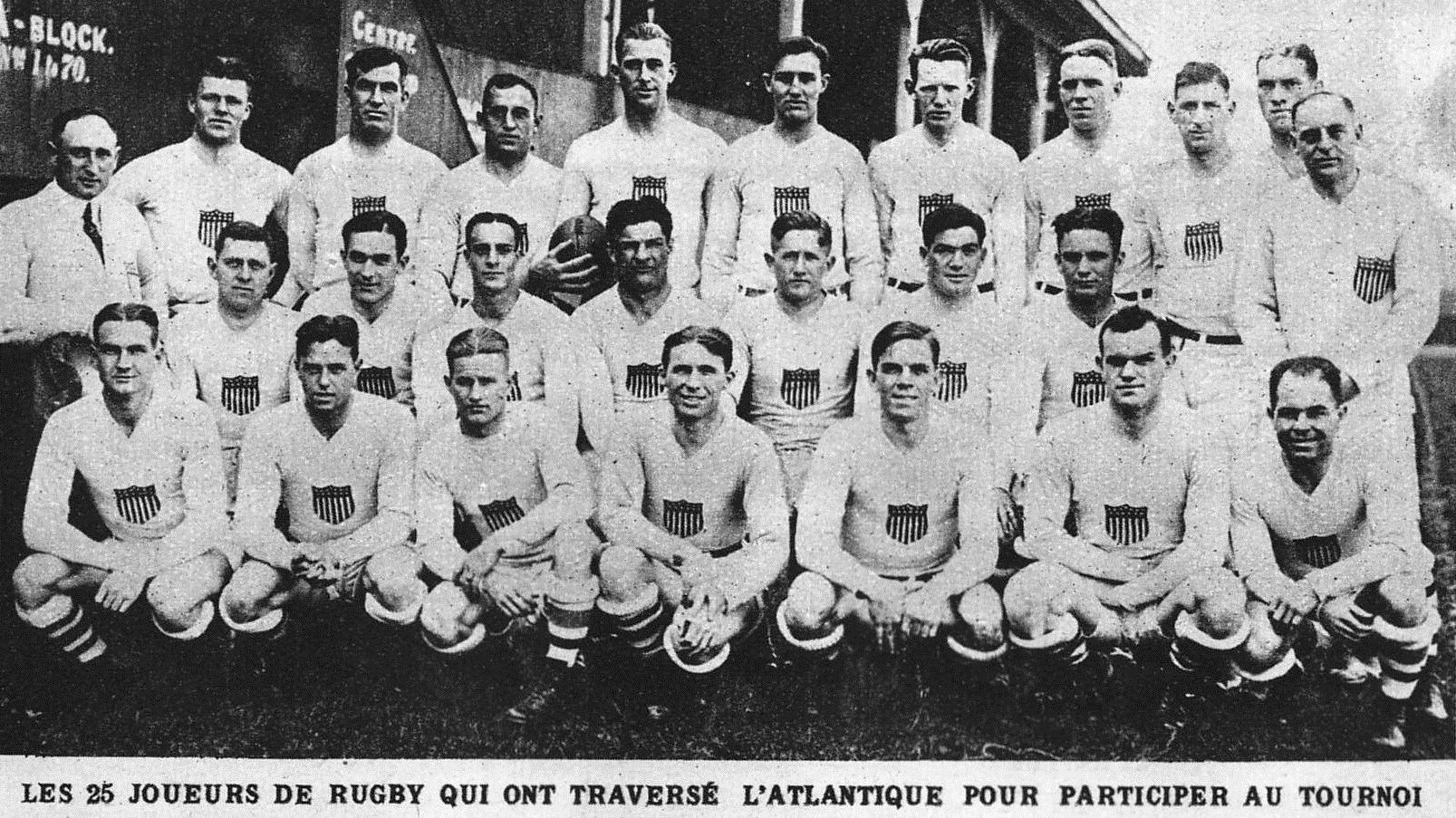
The U.S. team that won gold in the 1924 Summer Olympics in Paris

The final was played at Colombes Stadium on May 18 before an estimated crowd of 30,000–50,000 that had gathered to watch the rugby final and the awarding of the first medal of the 1924 Olympics. Bookmakers set the odds at five to one with a 20-point spread. However, the Americans were not intimidated, and the American captain Babe Slater wrote in his diary before the match "we are sure going to let them know they have been in a battle." Despite the odds, the U.S. team started well, led by captain Colby "Babe" Slater, and led 3–0 at the half. Heavy tackling by the Americans, derived from American football, intimidated and exhausted the French, as the U.S. scored four tries in the second half to defeat the French 17–3. Rare vintage film footage of the 1924 gold medal match was released in the documentary, "A Giant Awakens: the Rise of American Rugby".

Shortly after the 1924 Olympics, however, the International Olympic Committee (IOC) removed rugby union as an Olympic sport. Without the Olympic incentive, the sport's growth in America collapsed and the game remained dormant.

=== The 1960s and 1970s ===
The sport then enjoyed a renaissance, beginning in the 1960s and continuing through the 1970s. This created the need for a national governing body to represent the United States in the international rugby community. The United States of America Rugby Football Union (now known as USA Rugby) was formed in 1975 by four territorial organizations (Pacific Coast, West, Midwest, and East). The first Eagles match was played against Australia in 1976, before a crowd of 7,000 at Glover Stadium in Anaheim. The Wallabies won 24–12.

The U.S. also performed well against France in Chicago, losing the game 14–33, in front of 8,000 fans. The next season the Eagles played two internationals, one against England (XV-not capped) at Twickenham on their 1977 United States rugby union tour of England, which they lost 37–11, and the other against Canada, which they also lost, 17–6. The U.S. played the Canadians again in 1978, and defeated them 12–7 in Baltimore. They then travelled to Canada in 1979 and lost 19–12 in Toronto.

=== The 1980s ===
The U.S. national team came to further prominence during the 1980s, and from the start of the decade, were playing a notably larger number of games every season. They did however lose all three of their games in 1980, all at home. They could not muster up a win in 1981 either, losing 3–6 to Canada, and 7–38 to South Africa, in what was considered to be the lowest attended international rugby match, with only 30 spectators present at a private polo ground in Glenville, New York. In 1982, the U.S. drew Canada 3–3. They travelled to Australia in 1983 to play the Wallabies, and lost 49–3 in Sydney. The U.S. played its first-ever match against Japan in 1985, winning 16–15 at the Prince Chichibu Memorial Stadium.

The U.S. participated in 1987 in the first ever Rugby World Cup in New Zealand and Australia. The U.S. were in Pool 1, alongside co-hosts Australia, England and Japan. The U.S. won their first ever World Cup game, defeating Japan 21–18 at Ballymore Stadium in Brisbane, with fullback Ray Nelson scoring 13 points. The U.S. lost both subsequent matches; 47–12 against the Wallabies and 34–6 against England. The U.S. finished third in the pool, out of contention for the quarterfinals.

The Eagles first met Wales at Cardiff in November 1987 as the final match of their 1987 tour, where Wales, who had just finished third in the inaugural Rugby World Cup, enjoyed a 46–0 win. In 1988, the Eagles had mixed success in their tour of Europe, defeating Romania but losing to the Soviet Union.

=== The 1990s ===
The U.S. notched three consecutive wins from September 1990 to May 1991 — all against Japan — for the first three-match win streak in U.S. team history.

The U.S. made their way through a qualifying tournament to reach the 1991 Rugby World Cup in the United Kingdom, pooled with defending champions New Zealand, hosts England, and Italy in a tough group. In their first match of the tournament, Italy defeated them 30–9. Next, New Zealand defeated them 46–6. Hosts England won 37–9 at Twickenham. The U.S. finished fourth in the pool.

The Eagles came close to beating an Australian XV side, at Riverside in 1993, losing 22–26.

In round one of the Americas qualifying tournament for the 1995 Rugby World Cup the U.S. defeated Bermuda 60–3 to advance to round two. Argentina defeated the Eagles twice in close games in the series to qualify, leaving the U.S. missing out on the 1995 Rugby World Cup in South Africa.

The Eagles had a successful tour of Europe in 1998, beating Spain and Portugal. Also in 1998, the U.S. played Fiji for the first time, losing 9–18 in Suva.

The Eagles set out to qualify for the 1999 Rugby World Cup in Wales. In round four of the Americas qualifying tournament in Buenos Aires, the United States lost 52–24 to Argentina and 31–14 to Canada, but defeated Uruguay 21–16 in their last game to qualify for the 1999 tournament. The U.S. played in the 1999 Pacific Rim Championship, notching its first-ever victories over Fiji (25–14) and Tonga (30–10).

However, the Eagles subsequently suffered their heaviest defeat ever, losing 106–8 to England in a warmup match before the 1999 Rugby World Cup.

The Eagles entered the 1999 Rugby World Cup in pool E alongside Australia, Ireland and Romania. In their first game, the United States went down 53–8 to Ireland. They then lost to Romania 27–25. Australia defeated the Eagles 55–19 in their final game of the tournament, seeing the Eagles finish fourth in the pool. The Eagles, however, had the honor of being the only side to score a try against the eventual champions, Australia, during the entire tournament.

=== The 2000s ===
In qualifying matches for the 2003 Rugby World Cup the U.S. finished third in the Americas. The U.S. won the repechage and qualified for the 2003 tournament by beating Spain 62–13 and 58–13. The Super Powers Cup was first contested in 2003 between Japan, Russia and the United States. The U.S. then followed up with victories over Japan and Canada. This was the first time the Eagles had won four consecutive tests since making their international debut in 1976.

At the 2003 Rugby World Cup the Eagles finished fourth of five in their pool. In the first match against Fiji, the Americans led 13–3 early in the second half, but Fiji regained the lead and secured a 19–18 win, with the Eagles suffering their ninth consecutive World Cup loss. The U.S. then lost to Scotland. The Americans defeated Japan 39–26, behind 17 points by Mike Hercus, for their first win in a Rugby World Cup since 1987 (also against Japan). The U.S. closed the tournament with a loss to France, concluding the tournament with a 1–3 record.

The 2004 Super Powers Cup saw the addition of Canada. The U.S. beat Russia in the third-place play-off. The U.S. toured Europe in November 2004, losing 55–6 to Ireland and 43–25 to Italy. The 2005 Super Cup took part between the U.S., Canada, Japan and Romania. The U.S. lost 30–26 to Canada but beat a Romanian team stripped of their France-based players 23–16 in the third place play-off.

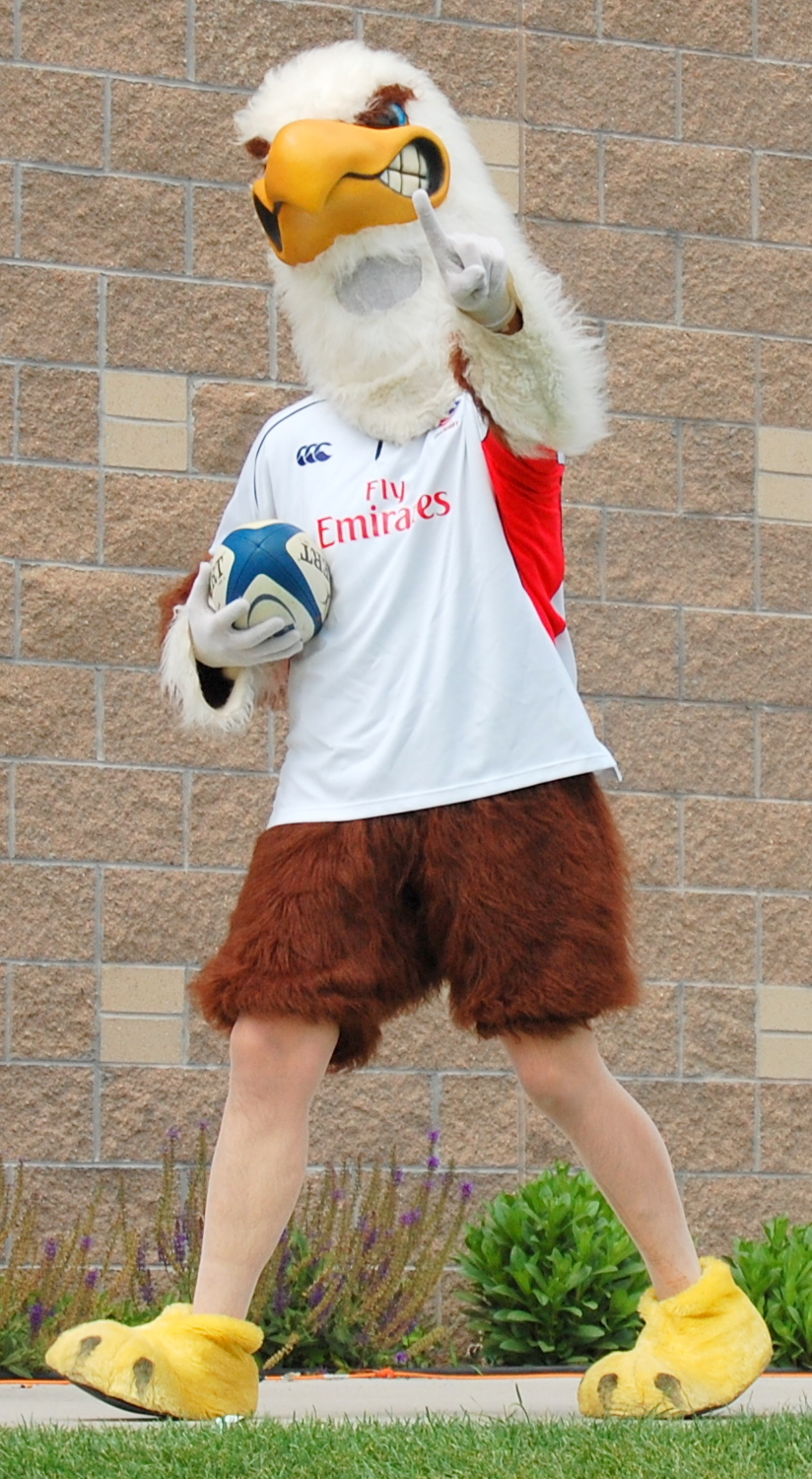
The U.S. Eagle mascot during 2010 Churchill Cup.

The U.S. campaign to qualify for the 2007 Rugby World Cup began in 2006. The U.S. lost 56–7 to Canada, resulting in a home/away play-off against Uruguay. The U.S. defeated Uruguay 42–13 in the first match and 26–7 in the second to send them through to the Rugby World Cup.

In the 2007 Rugby World Cup, the U.S. joined England, Samoa, South Africa and Tonga in Pool A. The Eagles, ranked 13th in the world standings, lost all 4 games in Pool A, scoring 1 bonus point in the game against Samoa. Coached by New Zealander Peter Thorburn, the Eagles started off with tough match against the defending world champions England, losing 28–10. The U.S. was then beaten by Tonga 25–15, lost to Samoa 25–21, and lost their final match to highly favored South Africa 64–15. The Eagles, however, had a major highlight in the South Africa match. After a Todd Clever interception and a pair of passes, Takudzwa Ngwenya sped down the sideline and outran the speedster Bryan Habana to score a try that received Try of the Year honors at the 2007 IRB Awards.

Following the resignation of Scott Johnson, on March 5, 2009 Eddie O'Sullivan was named the new national coach.

The Eagles finished a solid 2009 campaign at a mark of 4–5, with a 4–3 record in full internationals. In the 2009 Churchill Cup, the Eagles lost to Ireland and Wales, but defeated Georgia to take home the Bowl.

=== The 2011 Rugby World Cup cycle ===
The Eagles split a World Cup qualifying series with Canada, but lost on aggregate points. The Eagles then faced Uruguay in a two-game playoff. In November 2009, the United States booked their place at the 2011 Rugby World Cup with two wins against Uruguay, winning the home leg 27–6 in Florida.

The Eagles played 7 matches in 2010: 3 home matches in June at the Churchill Cup, finishing with a 1–2 record, and 4 matches in Europe in the Fall, finishing 1–3. In the June 2010 Churchill Cup, the US beat Russia 39–22, before losing to the England Saxons 32–9 and France A 24–10. For the November 2010 tests, the Eagles traveled to Europe. The Eagles defeated Portugal 22–17, but lost to Scotland A 25–0, and lost to Georgia 19–17. The Eagles finished 2010 ranked 16th in the world, and with a record in test matches of 2 wins (Russia, Portugal) and 1 loss (Georgia).

The buildup to the 2011 Rugby World Cup started in June with three matches in the Churchill Cup. The Eagles dropped their first matches to the England Saxons 87–8 and to Tonga 44–13, before defeating Russia 32–25. 2011 was the final Churchill Cup. The Eagles finalized their 2011 Rugby World Cup preparations with three test matches in August. The Eagles lost to Canada 28–22, lost their second match against Canada 27–7. and lost to Japan 20–14. The Eagles had a 1–5 record in test matches for the year in their preparations for the 2011 Rugby World Cup.

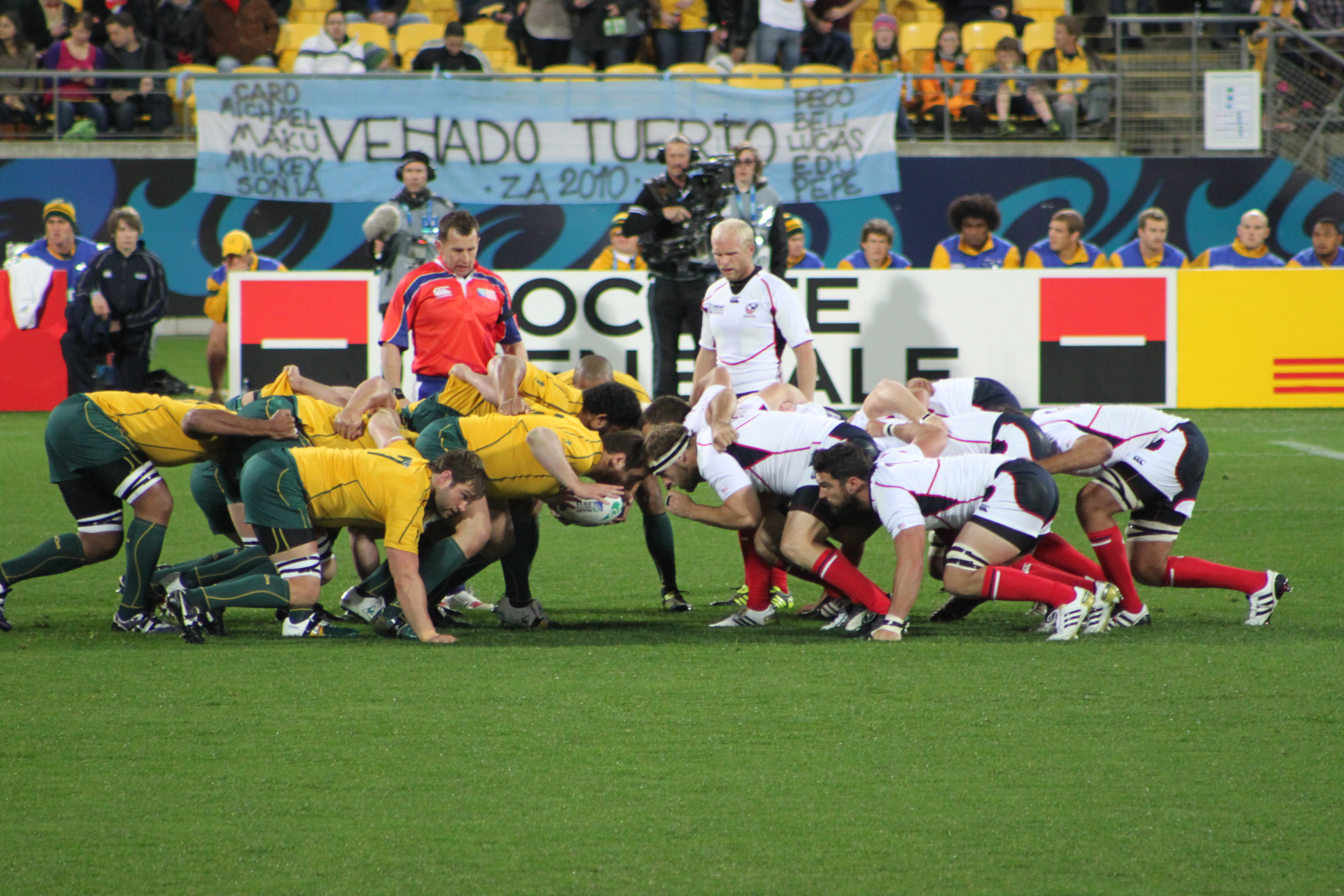
Australia scrum against the U.S. at the 2011 RWC.

In their 2011 Rugby World Cup opening match against Ireland the Eagles defense initially held, before conceding their first try at the 39' mark. The final tally was 22–10. The Eagles came into the World Cup with their measuring mark for success as being a win over Russia. The Americans took a 10–3 lead into the half, and held on to win 13–6. For their third match, Australia dominated, leading to the final result of 67–5, the worst defeat a U.S. team has ever suffered to Australia. The final match saw the Eagles playing Italy for a third-place finish in Pool C. The Italians finished with a 27–10 victory. The defeat marked the end of the 2011 Rugby World Cup for the U.S.

The Eagles finished 2011 with a record of 2–7 in full tests. The performances in the Rugby World Cup showed improvement, and the win over Russia left the team with a 1–3 RWC record and feeling as a modest success. The World Cup also saw prop Mike MacDonald become both the most capped Eagle in World Cup play (11 caps) and the most capped Eagle of all time at 65 caps. Also notable was the performance of lock John van der Giessen, who achieved the most lineout steals of all players in the 2011 Rugby World Cup, despite appearing in only three matches.

=== The 2015 Rugby World Cup cycle ===
The Eagles played three matches in North America during the 2012 June international window. This was a regular series of international tests for the United States against Tier 1 (Italy) and Tier 2 (Canada, Georgia) opponents, as the Churchill Cup is no longer held. The highlights of the June tests were a win over higher-ranked Georgia, and a match against Italy at BBVA Compass Stadium in Houston that drew a record crowd of 17,214. The Eagles also played three matches in Europe during the November 2012 tests. The Eagles finished their European tour with 2 wins (Romania, Russia) and 1 loss (Tonga) — the first time since 1998 that the Eagles had concluded a European tour with a winning record — and improved in ranking from 17th to 16th.

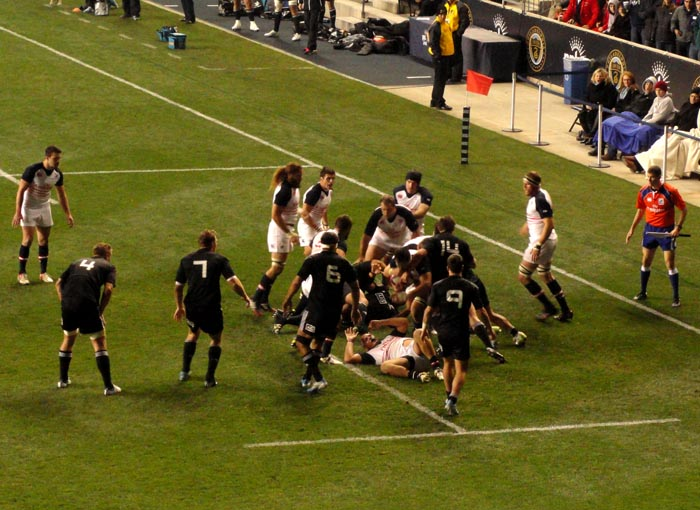
The U.S. v. the Māori All Blacks at PPL Park in 2013.

The U.S. played five matches during the June 2013 international test window, with one test match against Ireland and four matches as part of the 2013 IRB Pacific Nations Cup. The U.S. started with competitive matches against Canada (9–16), Ireland (12–15), and Tonga (9–18), but finished with double-digit losses against Fiji (10–35) and Japan (20–38), and sliding to #18 in the rankings. In August 2013, the U.S. played a home-and-away series against Canada as part of qualifying for the 2015 Rugby World Cup. The U.S. lost both matches by an aggregate score of 20–40, meaning the U.S. must play Uruguay in 2014 as part of 2015 RWC qualifying. In November 2013, the U.S. lost 19–29 to the Māori All Blacks at PPL Park in Philadelphia before a sold-out crowd of 18,500.

Throughout late 2013 and early 2014, a number of U.S. players signed contracts to play professionally overseas. Of the players called into the U.S. national team in March 2014 for two home-and-away 2015 Rugby World Cup qualifying matches against Uruguay, 14 of the 26 were playing professionally overseas, with 10 playing professionally in England. The Eagles defeated Uruguay 59–40 on aggregate over two tests during 2014 to qualify for the 2015 Rugby World Cup. During the June 2014 test window, the U.S. played competitive matches against higher ranked Scotland and Japan, and the test window culminated with a 38–35 victory over Canada. Subsequently, in November 2014 the Eagles were defeated 74–6 by New Zealand in a match played in front of a crowd of more than 61,000 spectators at Soldier Field, Chicago.

The Eagles began a lengthy assembly in build up to the 2015 Rugby World Cup with the 2015 Pacific Nations Cup. On July 18, the U.S. dropped the opening PNC match 21–16 to Samoa. The team bounced back to upset Japan 23–18. The Eagles, however, fell to Tonga in the final preliminary match for the PNC 33–19. In the resulting fifth-place match, the Eagles edged rival Canada 15–13. The victory was the second consecutive over team Canada. Three weeks later, Canada and the U.S. met again in a World Cup warmup match. For the first time, the U.S. laid claim to a three-match win streak over team Canada after defeating the Canadians 41–23. Continuing on the road to the World Cup, the U.S. faced off against English Premiership side Harlequins, where the Americans fell to the visitors 24–19. The Eagles returned to Soldier Field to compete against the #2 ranked Australia Wallabies. The Americans trailed 14–10 at the half. In the second half, the Wallabies capitalized on American errors and pushed the match out of reach: Australia 47, the U.S. 10.

=== Professionalization of the domestic league (2016–present) ===
The Professional Rugby Organization (PRO Rugby) began a professional rugby competition in 2016. Five teams played a 10-match schedule from April to July. Each PRO Rugby team had a quota for overseas players and U.S. Eagles internationals. The U.S. national team included 14 professionals in the starting lineup for the June 2015 test against Italy — six U.S.-based professionals and eight overseas professionals. PRO Rugby did not last long, however, with the competition folding after only one season.

Professional rugby returned in 2018 with the advent of Major League Rugby, a seven-team competition that runs from April to early July. U.S. head coach Gary Gold called up an all-professional squad for the June 2018 tests, drawing from a mix of Major League Rugby players and overseas professionals. During the June 2018 tests, the U.S. defeated Scotland 30–29 to give the U.S. its first win over a Tier 1 nation since beating France at the 1924 Olympics. In the November tests, the U.S added wins against Canada (42–17), Samoa (30–29), and Romania (31–5) to ensure their longest full international test win streak in team history with 10. The streak ended with a defeat to Ireland in Dublin. In their first match of the 2019 Rugby World Cup, they were defeated (45–7) against England.

In 2022, the Eagles failed to qualify for a World Cup for the first time since the 1995 edition having participated in the prior six tournaments. In the Final Qualification Tournament they drew with Portugal 16–16, but as a result of a points difference, Portugal advanced to their second-ever Rugby World Cup. Earlier in the qualification process the U.S. lost a two-game series, 50–34 to Uruguay and then lost by a single point to Chile on aggregate.

After defeating Romania 53–24 in November 2026, the Eagles alongside Georgia were crowned joint champions of the inaugural World Rugby Nations Cup, their first silverware since winning the 2018 Americas Rugby Championship.

== Recent results ==
The following table shows the results of the U.S. national team during the previous 24 months, as well as upcoming fixtures.

Notes:

- Opponent rank is listed as of the date of the match.
- Green shading indicates a win or tie against a higher ranked opponent. Red shading indicates a loss or tie against a lower ranked opponent.

Date	Opponent	Opp Rank	Result	Venue	Attendance	Event	Top U.S. scorer
October 15, 2027	Japan			Adelaide Oval		Rugby World Cup	
October 9, 2027	Samoa			Perth Stadium		Rugby World Cup	
October 2, 2027	France			Docklands Stadium		Rugby World Cup	
November 21, 2026	Georgia	13	L 10–38	Mikheil Meskhi Stadium		Nations Cup	Hilsenbeck, Ryan (5)
November 14, 2026	Romania	23	W 53–24	Stadionul National Arcul de Triumf		Nations Cup	Hilsenbeck, McLean (10)
November 8, 2026	Hong Kong	23	W 28–26	Stade Marcel-Verchère	2,700	Nations Cup	Hilsenbeck (6)
October 30, 2026	Australia A	—N/a	L 0–52	Sports Illustrated Stadium		Non-capped test match	—N/a
October 24, 2026	Australia A	—N/a	L 12–61	Geodis Park	8,186	Non-capped test match	Baska, O'Keeffe (5)
September 19, 2026	Canada	24	L 16–19	Chichibunomiya Rugby Stadium		Pacific Nations Cup	Carty (11)
September 12, 2026	Japan	12	L 14–63	Hanazono Rugby Stadium	13,559	Pacific Nations Cup	Klein, Lopeti (5)
August 15, 2026	Argentina XV	—N/a	W 25–24	Inter Miami CF Stadium		Non-capped test match	Carty (10)
July 18, 2026	Spain	16	W 29–22	WakeMed Soccer Park	7,397	Nations Cup	Five tied (5)
July 11, 2026	Zimbabwe	25	W 31–15	Memorial Stadium	~3,000	Nations Cup	Carty (9)
July 4, 2026	Portugal	14	W 30–29	Dick's Sporting Goods Park	10,500	Nations Cup	Hilsenbeck (15)
November 15, 2025	Romania	21	W 26–18	Stadionul Arcul de Triumf		end-of-year tests	Carty (12)
November 8, 2025	Georgia	11	L 30–43	Adjarabet Arena		end-of-year tests	Carty (15)
November 1, 2025	Scotland	8	L 0–85	Murrayfield Stadium	56,589	end-of-year tests	—N/a
September 14, 2025	Samoa	14	W 29–13	Dick's Sporting Goods Park	6,452	Pacific Nations Cup	Wilson (6)
September 9, 2025	Japan	13	L 21–47	Heart Health Park	6,079	Pacific Nations Cup	Pifeleti (10)
August 22, 2025	Canada	25	L 20–34	McMahon Stadium	11,587	Pacific Nations Cup	MacGinty (10)
July 19, 2025	England	5	L 5–40	Audi Field	19,079	mid-year tests	Klein (5)
July 12, 2025	Spain	16	L 20–31	Memorial Stadium	6,129	mid-year tests	MacGinty (10)
July 5, 2025	Belgium	22	W 36–17	Memorial Stadium		mid-year tests	MacGinty (6)
November 23, 2024	Spain	17	W 26–23	Estadio Nacional Complutense		end-of-year tests	Lopeti (10)

== Overall record and rankings ==
Men's World Rugby Rankings Top 20 as of 16 November 2026
Rank	Change (Note: Change from the previous week)	Team	Points
1	Steady	South Africa	91.53
2	Steady	New Zealand	90.65
3	▲1	France	89.05
4	▼1	Ireland	88.70
5	Steady	England	86.99
6	Steady	Scotland	85.28
7	Steady	Australia	82.24
8	Steady	Argentina	82.09
9	▲1	Wales	79.37
10	▼1	Fiji	77.79
11	Steady	Italy	75.84
12	Steady	Japan	75.25
13	Steady	Georgia	74.23
14	▲1	United States	68.39
15	▼1	Portugal	68.24
16	▲3	Samoa	67.60
17	▲1	Chile	67.00
18	▼2	Spain	66.53
19	▼2	Tonga	65.58
20	Steady	Uruguay	65.17

United_States's historical rankings

Source: World Rugby
Graph updated to 16 November 2026

Representative rugby matches played by the United States national XV at test level up to November 14, 2026.
Opponent	Played	Won	Lost	Drawn	Win %	For	Against	Diff
Argentina	9	0	9	0	0%	136	294	−158
Argentina Jaguars	1	0	1	0	0%	30	34	−4
Australia	8	0	8	0	0%	78	368	−290
Australia XV	1	0	1	0	0%	22	26	−4
Barbados	1	1	0	0	100%	91	0	+91
Belgium	1	1	0	0	100%	36	17	+19
Bermuda	1	1	0	0	100%	60	3	+57
Brazil	5	4	1	0	80%	200	74	+126
Canada	68	25	41	2	36.76%	1,262	1,566	−304
Chile	8	6	2	0	75%	336	125	+211
England	8	0	8	0	0%	93	381	−288
England XV	2	0	2	0	0%	11	96	−85
England A	4	0	4	0	0%	29	194	−165
Fiji	7	1	6	0	14.29%	100	165	−65
France	8	1	7	0	12.5%	102	214	−112
France XV	1	1	0	0	100%	8	0	+8
Georgia	8	3	5	0	37.5%	183	182	+1
Germany	1	1	0	0	100%	46	17	+29
Hong Kong	9	5	4	0	55.56%	229	224	+5
Ireland	11	0	11	0	0%	125	489	−364
Ireland XV	1	0	1	0	0%	7	32	−25
Ireland Wolfhounds	2	0	2	0	0%	22	74	−52
Italy	5	0	5	0	0%	74	154	−80
Japan	27	13	13	1	48.15%	734	711	+23
Kenya	1	1	0	0	100%	68	14	+54
New Zealand	4	0	4	0	0%	29	275	−246
New Zealand XV	1	0	1	0	0%	6	53	−47
Māori	1	0	1	0	0%	6	74	−68
Portugal	6	4	1	1	66.67%	170	130	+40
Romania	13	10	3	0	76.92%	360	185	+175
Russia	8	8	0	0	100%	280	110	+170
Samoa	9	3	6	0	33.33%	170	187	−17
Scotland	8	1	7	0	12.5%	103	376	−273
Scotland XV	1	0	1	0	0%	12	41	−29
Scotland A	1	0	1	0	0%	9	13	−4
South Africa	4	0	4	0	0%	42	209	−167
Soviet Union	1	0	1	0	0%	16	31	−15
Spain	7	6	1	0	85.71%	286	117	+169
Tonga	11	2	9	0	18.18%	189	289	−100
Tunisia	1	1	0	0	100%	47	13	+34
Uruguay	20	15	4	1	75%	612	364	+248
Wales	7	0	7	0	0%	86	305	−219
Wales XV	1	0	1	0	0%	18	24	−6
Zimbabwe	1	1	0	0	100%	31	15	+16
Total	303	115	183	5	37.95%	6,554	8,265	−1,711

=== Wins against Tier 1 nations ===
The following is a list of U.S.'s wins against Tier 1 countries, including XV sides:

September 5, 1920	United States	8–0	France XV	(Belgium) Olympisch Stadion, Antwerp
	Try: Joseph Hunter; Con: Dink Templeton; Pen: Dink Templeton	Report		Attendance: 55,000

May 18, 1924	France	3–17	United States	(France) Stade Olympique Yves-du-Manoir, Colombes
	Try: Henri Galau	Report	Try: Jack Patrick; Lefty Rogers; Linn Farrish (2); Caesar Mannelli; Con: Charlie Doe	Attendance: 20,000

February 3, 2018	United States	17–10	Argentina XV	(United States) StubHub Center, Carson, California
17:00 PST	Try: Tony Lamborn 57'm Pen: Will Magie (2/4) 16', 42'; Will Hooley (2/2) 70', 77'	Report	Try: Santiago Montagner 38'c Con: Juan Cruz González (1/1) 39'; Pen: Juan Cruz González (1/2) 23'	Attendance: 6,500; Referee: Chris Assmus (Canada)

June 16, 2018	United States	30–29	Scotland	(United States) BBVA Compass Stadium, Houston
	Try: Joe Taufete'e (2) 37' c, 42' c Hanco Germishuys 58' c Con: AJ MacGinty (3/3) 38', 43', 60'; Pen: AJ MacGinty (3/3) 16', 28', 47'	Report	Try: Blair Kinghorn 1' c Penalty try 24'; George Turnere 33' c Dougie Fife 80' m Con: Blair Kinghorn (2/3) 2', 35'; Pen: Blair Kinghorn (1/2) 40'	Attendance: 11,300; Referee: Wayne Barnes (England)

August 15, 2026	United States	25–24	Argentina XV	(United States) Inter Miami CF Stadium, Fort Lauderdale
	Try: Klein 22', Alikhan 34' c, Redelinghuys 62' c Con: Carty (2/3) 35', 63'; Pen: Carty (2/2) 4', 53'	Report	Try: Martin Vaca 9', Nicolas Viola 30', Franco Rossetto 40' c, Thiago Sbrocco 71' c Con: Ignacio Dogliani (2/4) 40', 72'	Referee: Jeremy Rozier (France)

=== Record against Tier 1 teams ===
The following table shows the top ten best U.S. results in test matches against Tier 1 opponents.

Pts Diff	Result	Opponent	Date
+14	W (17–3)	France	1924-05-18
+1	W (30–29)	Scotland	2018-06-16
–3	L (26–29)	Argentina	1996-09-14
–3	L (12–15)	Ireland	2013-06-08
–4	L (8–12)	Australia	1912-11-16
–4	L (20–24)	Italy	2016-06-18
–5	L (11–16)	Argentina	1994-06-20
–5	L (23–28)	Wales	1997-07-12
–6	L (22–28)	Argentina	1994-05-28

== Rivalry with Canada ==
The United States' biggest rival is Canada, having played more test matches against Canada than any other nation. The two teams first met in 1977, and have played every year since then with the exceptions of 2010 and 2020, 2022–2023. As of the end of 2026, the two sides have met 68 times, with 25 wins for the U.S., 41 wins for Canada, and 2 draws.

The U.S. and Canada routinely play each other in qualifying matches for the Rugby World Cup. They have met in the qualification stages for every tournament, with the exception of the 1987 invitational tournament and the 1995 tournament, for which Canada had automatically qualified by reaching the quarterfinals in the 1991 Rugby World Cup. Between 2016 and 2019, the teams played each other annually in the now defunct Americas Rugby Championship.

== Rugby World Cup ==
The United States has qualified for every Rugby World Cup except the 1995 and 2023 tournament. The United States will host the 2031 tournament. The best result that the U.S. has managed at a Rugby World Cup is to win one game, which it accomplished in 1987, 2003, and again in 2011.

Rugby World Cup record									Qualification						
Year	Round	Pld	W	D	L	PF	PA	Squad	Pos	Pld	W	D	L	PF	PA
(New Zealand) (Australia) 1987	Pool stage	3	1	0	2	39	99	Squad	Invited						
(England) (France) (Ireland) (Scotland) (Wales) 1991	Pool stage	3	0	0	3	24	113	Squad	3rd	4	1	0	3	29	69
(South Africa) 1995	Did not qualify								P/O	3	1	0	2	93	47
(Wales) 1999	Pool stage	3	0	0	3	52	135	Squad	3rd	3	1	0	2	59	99
(Australia) 2003	Pool stage	4	1	0	3	86	125	Squad	P/O	8	4	0	4	224	165
(France) 2007	Pool stage	4	0	0	4	61	142	Squad	P/O	4	3	0	1	173	76
(New Zealand) 2011	Pool stage	4	1	0	3	38	122	Squad	P/O	4	3	0	1	84	75
(England) 2015	Pool stage	4	0	0	4	50	156	Squad	P/O	4	1	1	2	79	80
(Japan) 2019	Pool stage	4	0	0	4	52	156	Squad	P/O	2	1	1	0	80	44
(France) 2023	Did not qualify								P/O	9	5	1	3	277	189
(Australia) 2027	Qualified								3rd	3	1	0	2	70	95
(United States) 2031	Qualified as Hosts								Automatically qualified						
Total	—	29	3	0	26	402	1048	—	—	44	21	3	20	1171	939
Champions; Runners–up; Third place; Fourth place; Home venue

== Other tournaments ==
=== Honors ===
Americas Rugby Championship

- Champion (2): 2017, 2018

Olympics

- Gold Medal (2): 1920, 1924

World Rugby Nations Cup

- Champion (1): 2026

=== World Rugby Nations Cup ===
Tournament	U.S. record	U.S. finish	Leading U.S. scorer	U.S. wins
2026	5–0	1st / 6	Christopher Hilsenbeck (27)	Portugal, Zimbabwe, Spain, Hong Kong, Romania

=== Pacific Nations Cup ===
The Pacific Nations Cup has been held since 2006 and the United States has been a participant in seven tournaments.

Tournament	U.S. record	U.S. finish	Leading U.S. scorer	U.S. wins
2013	0–4	5th / 5	Chris Wyles (19)	—N/a
2014	1–1	2nd / 3	Chris Wyles (32)	Canada
2015	2–2	5th / 6	AJ MacGinty (44)	Japan, Canada
2019	2–1	3rd / 6	AJ MacGinty (28)	Canada, Samoa
2024	1–3	4th / 6	Luke Carty (25)	Canada
2025	1–2	5th / 6	Luke Carty/Kapeli Pifeleti/AJ MacGinty (10)	Samoa
2026	0–2	4th / 4	Luke Carty (11)	—N/a

=== Americas Rugby Championship ===
The Americas Rugby Championship involved the six highest ranked rugby nations in North and South America (Argentina XV, Brazil, Canada, Chile, United States, and Uruguay). It was first contested in 2016.

Tournament	U.S. record	U.S. finish	Leading U.S. scorer	U.S. wins
2016	2–1–2	2nd	James Bird (32)	Canada, Chile
2017	4–1–0	1st	Ben Cima (36)	Uruguay, Brazil, Canada, Chile
2018	5–0–0	1st	Will Magie (38)	Argentina XV, Uruguay, Brazil, Canada, Chile
2019	3–0–2	3rd	Joe Taufete'e (30)	Brazil, Canada, Chile

=== Summer Olympics ===
Rugby was included as an Olympic sport four times from 1900 to 1924, with the United States winning the last two of those tournaments — 1920 and 1924. After a lengthy absence, rugby returned to the Summer Olympics in 2016, albeit in the rugby sevens format.

Olympics	U.S. finish	U.S. record	Defeated
(France) 1900 Paris	(U.S. did not participate)		
(United Kingdom) 1908 London	(U.S. did not participate)		
(Belgium) 1920 Antwerp	Gold	1–0	France
(France) 1924 Paris	Gold	2–0	France, Romania

=== Defunct competitions ===
==== Pacific Rim Rugby Championship ====
Year	Winner	Runner-up	Third place	Refs
1996	Canada	Hong Kong	United States	
1997	Canada	Hong Kong	Japan	
1998	Canada	Hong Kong	United States	
1999	Japan	Western Samoa	United States	
2000	Fiji	Western Samoa	Tonga	
2001	Fiji	Western Samoa	Japan	

==== Churchill Cup ====
Year	Host nation(s)	U.S. record	U.S. finish / # Teams
2003	Canada	1–2	2nd / 3
2004	Canada	0–2	4th / 4
2005	Canada	1–1	3rd / 4
2006	Canada & United States	0–3	6th / 6
2007	England	0–3	6th / 6
2008	Canada & United States	0–3	6th / 6
2009	United States	1–2	5th / 6
2010	United States	1–2	4th / 6
2011	England	1–2	5th / 6

==== Super Cup ====
Year	Champion	Second	Third	Fourth	US Record (W–L)
2003	Russia	United States	Japan	N/A	1–1
2004	Japan	Canada	United States	Russia	1–1
2005	Canada	Japan	United States	Romania	1–1

== Coaches ==
=== Current coaching staff ===
Correct as of November 29, 2026

Position	Name
Head coach	(United States) Scott Lawrence
Backs and kicking coach	(New Zealand) Stephen Brett
Defence coach	(Australia) Nathan Grey
Forwards and contact coach	(New Zealand) Dan Perrin

=== Coaching history ===
Below is a table of USA rugby coaching records during test matches. Non-capped matches are not included. Months listed reflect the month of the first and last match coached. Correct as of November 14, 2026

Coach	Season(s)	GP	W	D	L	Win %	Championships / notes
—N/a	November 1912	1	0	0	1	0%	First International test match
—N/a	November 1913	1	0	0	1	0%	
—N/a	June 1919	1	1	0	0	100%	1–1 at the Inter-Allied Games (Match against France XV was uncapped)
(Ireland) Harry Maloney (trainer/selector) (Australia) Daniel Carroll (player/coach)	September 1920 – October 1920	2	1	0	1	50%	1920 Olympic Gold Medal
(United States) Charlie Austin	May 1924	2	2	0	0	100%	1924 Olympic Gold Medal
(England) Dennis Storer	January 1976	1	0	0	1	0%	First U.S. national team coach in the modern era
(England) Dennis Storer (England) Ray Cornbill	June 1976 – June 1982	12	1	1	10	8.33%	
(New Zealand) Ron Mayes	June 1983 – May 1987	9	3	1	5	33.33%	
(Ireland) George Hook (New Zealand) Ron Mayes	May 1987 – June 1987	3	1	0	2	33.33%	1–2 at the 1987 RWC
(England) Jim Perkins	November 1987 – October 1991	22	7	0	15	31.82%	0–3 at the 1991 RWC
(United States) Clarence Culpepper	April 1992 – June 1992	2	1	0	1	50%	
(United States) Jack Clark	June 1993 – October 1999	48	16	0	32	33.33%	First coach to fail to qualify for a Rugby World Cup (1995). 0–3 at the 1999 RWC
(Australia) Duncan Hall	May 2000 – June 2001	12	3	0	9	33.33%	
(United States) Tom Billups	December 2001 – June 2005	32	12	0	20	37.5%	1–3 at the 2003 RWC
(New Zealand) Peter Thorburn	June 2006 – September 2007	14	3	0	11	21.43%	0–4 at the 2007 RWC
(Australia) Scott Johnson	June 2008 – November 2008	6	1	0	5	16.67%	
(Ireland) Eddie O'Sullivan	May 2009 – September 2011	19	8	0	11	42.11%	1–3 at the 2011 RWC
(United States) Mike Tolkin	June 2012 – October 2015	34	11	1	22	32.35%	0–4 at the 2015 RWC
(New Zealand) John Mitchell	February 2016 – July 2017	16	8	1	7	50%	Americas Rugby Championship: (2017)
(New Zealand) Dave Hewett	November 2017	2	1	0	1	50%	Interim
(South Africa) Gary Gold	February 2018 – November 2022	34	20	1	13	58.82%	Americas Rugby Championship: (2018); 0–4 at the 2019 RWC. Failed to qualify for the 2023 RWC
(United States) Scott Lawrence	August 2023 – present	30	15	0	15	50%	World Rugby Nations Cup: (2026)
Total	1912–present	303	115	5	183	37.95%	

== Players ==
=== Current squad ===
On November 3, the USA named a 30-player squad ahead of the 2026 World Rugby Nations Cup European-African-Asian Series.

- Caps Updated: November 14, 2026 (after Romania v USA)

Note: Flags indicate national union for the club/province as defined by World Rugby.

Player	Position	Date of birth (age)	Caps	Club/province
Kaleb Geiger	Hooker	May 4, 1996 (age 30)	15	(United States) New England Free Jacks
Shilo Klein	Hooker	May 4, 1999 (age 27)	10	Unattached
Sean McNulty	Hooker	October 7, 1995 (age 31)	6	(United States) Seattle Seawolves
Kapeli Pifeleti	Hooker	September 1, 1999 (age 27)	28	(France) Provence Rugby
Charlie Abel	Prop	January 29, 1992 (age 34)	3	(France) Oyonnax
Jack Iscaro	Prop	August 4, 1997 (age 29)	22	(France) Stade Français Paris
Ezekiel Lindenmuth	Prop	July 14, 1997 (age 29)	12	(New Zealand) Counties Manukau
Tonga Kofe	Prop	February 2, 1996 (age 30)	11	(United States) California Legion
Justus Tavai	Prop	June 26, 1998 (age 28)	0	(United States) Seattle Seawolves
Payton Telea-Ilalio	Prop	August 17, 1998 (age 28)	8	Unattached
Jason Damm (c)	Lock	January 26, 1995 (age 31)	21	(United States) California Legion
Nathan Den Hoedt	Lock	January 6, 1997 (age 29)	5	(United States) Chicago Hounds
Rhyno Herbst	Lock	July 5, 1996 (age 30)	1	(United States) Seattle Seawolves
Sam Golla	Lock	May 7, 1999 (age 27)	10	Unattached
Makeen Alikhan	Back row	October 10, 2001 (age 25)	9	Unattached
Benjamín Bonasso	Back row	June 1, 1997 (age 29)	15	(United States) Old Glory DC
Jamason Faʻanana-Schultz	Back row	June 13, 1996 (age 30)	14	(United States) New England Free Jacks
Nafi Ma'afu	Back row	June 18, 1998 (age 28)	6	(France) Montauban
Marno Redelinghuys	Back row	January 6, 1993 (age 33)	11	(United States) Seattle Seawolves
Paddy Ryan	Back row	December 11, 1990 (age 35)	22	(United States) Seattle Seawolves
Michael Baska	Scrum-half	November 17, 1994 (age 32)	7	(United States) Chicago Hounds
Spencer Huntley	Scrum-half	November 11, 2006 (age 20)	1	(England) Hartpury
Oscar Lennon	Scrum-half	May 15, 2000 (age 26)	2	(England) Bristol Bears
Christopher Hilsenbeck	Fly-half	January 10, 1992 (age 34)	10	(United States) Chicago Hounds
Tom Pittman	Fly-half	April 8, 1999 (age 27)	4	Unattached
Dominic Besag	Centre	August 6, 2004 (age 22)	23	(United States) Saint Mary's
Tavite Lopeti	Centre	November 20, 1998 (age 28)	31	(United States) Chicago Hounds
Cassh Maluia	Centre	October 3, 1998 (age 28)	2	(United States) California Legion
Noah Brown	Wing	January 10, 2001 (age 25)	3	(United States) Chicago Hounds
Perry Mayo	Wing	April 9, 2002 (age 24)	5	(France) Nevers
Rufus McLean	Wing	March 2, 2000 (age 26)	9	(France) Stade Français Paris
Connor Mooneyham	Wing	March 28, 1996 (age 30)	8	Unattached
John Rizzo	Wing	June 20, 1998 (age 28)	0	(United States) Old Glory DC
Mitch Wilson	Fullback	April 15, 1996 (age 30)	22	(United States) New England Free Jacks

=== Player records ===
==== Most caps ====
Rank	Player	Pos	Span	Caps	Starts
1	Todd Clever	Flanker	2003–2017	76	73
2	Cam Dolan	Number 8	2013–2023	67	58
2	Mike MacDonald	Prop	2000–2012	67	56
4	Luke Gross	Lock	1996–2003	62	61
5	Alec Parker	Lock	1996–2009	58	51
6	Mike Petri	Scrum-half	2007–2015	57	40
7	Louis Stanfill	Lock	2005–2015	56	45
8	Blaine Scully	Wing	2011–2019	54	50
8	Chris Wyles	Fullback	2007–2015	54	51
10	Paul Emerick	Center	2003–2012	53	49
10	Dave Hodges	Flanker	1996–2004	53	48

Last updated: August 23, 2025. Statistics include officially capped matches only.

==== Most tries ====
Rank	Player	Pos	Span	Mat	Tries
1	Vaea Anitoni	Wing	1992–2000	46	26
2	Joe Taufete'e	Hooker	2015–	38	23
3	Cam Dolan	Number 8	2013–2023	67	21
4	Paul Emerick	Center	2003–2012	53	17
5	Todd Clever	Flanker	2003–2017	76	16
5	Mike Te'o	Fullback	2016–2021	30	16
5	Chris Wyles	Fullback	2007–2015	54	16
8	Nate Augspurger	Wing	2016–2025	51	15
8	Blaine Scully	FB / Wing	2011–2019	54	15
10	Hanco Germishuys	Flanker	2016–2022	29	14

Last updated: September 19, 2026. Statistics include officially capped matches only.

==== Most points ====
Rank	Player	Pos	Span	Mat	Points
1	Mike Hercus	Fly-half	2002–2009	48	465
2	AJ MacGinty	Fly-half	2015–	43	425
3	Matt Alexander	Fly-half	1995–1998	24	286
4	Chris Wyles	Fullback	2007–2015	54	222
5	Luke Carty	Fly-half	2021–	31	152
6	Chris O'Brien	Fly-half	1988–1994	20	144
7	Mark Williams	Center	1987–1999	37	143
8	Vaea Anitoni	Wing	1992–2000	46	130
9	Joe Taufete'e	Hooker	2015–	38	115
10	Kevin Dalzell	Scrumhalf	1996–2003	42	109

Last updated: September 19, 2026. Statistics include officially capped matches only.

=== Award winners ===
The following United States players have been recognised at the World Rugby Awards since 2001:

World Rugby Player of the Year
Year	Nominees	Winners
2019	Joe Taufete'e	—

World Rugby Try of the Year
Year	Date	Scorer	Match	Tournament
2007	30 September	Takudzwa Ngwenya	vs. South Africa	Rugby World Cup

== Stadiums and attendance ==
The Eagles do not have an official home stadium. Boxer Stadium in San Francisco was the unofficial home of the Eagles from 1996 to 2000, hosting 12 of their 17 test matches. The Eagles also played several of their home games at Infinity Park in Glendale, Colorado. The Eagles played a home match against a Tier 1 nation every June from 2012 to 2014, in front of large crowds at BBVA Stadium in Houston, Texas. Since 2012, the Eagles have played at other MLS stadiums, such as Talen Energy Stadium in the Philadelphia area and the Dignity Health Sports Park in the Los Angeles area. The Eagles play some of their less high-profile matches at smaller soccer venues. Three of the largest attendances for international rugby matches on U.S. soil did not involve the United States national team. 61,500 watched Ireland defeat New Zealand 40–29 at Soldier Field on November 5, 2016. 61,841 watched the All Blacks defeat Ireland in the rematch at Soldier Field in 2025. 68,173 watched the Springboks beat the All Blacks at M&T Bank Stadium in 2026.

Below is a table of USA Eagles matches played in the U.S. in which the attendance was greater than 10,000 fans:

Rank	Attendance	Opponent	Date	Venue	Metro area
1	61,500	New Zealand	November 1, 2014	Soldier Field (NFL)	Chicago, Ill.
2	39,720	New Zealand	October 23, 2021	FedEx Field (NFL)	Washington D.C.
3	30,051 (Note: This match was part of a triple header, with the other two matches featuring Ireland vs Italy and the USA women vs New Zealand Black Ferns.)	Māori All Blacks	November 3, 2018	Soldier Field (NFL)	Chicago, Ill.
4	23,212	Australia	September 5, 2015	Soldier Field (NFL)	Chicago, Ill.
5	22,370	Ireland	June 10, 2017	Red Bull Arena (MLS)	New York, N.Y.
6	20,181	Ireland	June 8, 2013	BBVA Compass Stadium (Note: Now known as BBVA Stadium.) (MLS)	Houston, Tex.
7	20,001	Scotland	June 8, 2014	BBVA Compass Stadium (MLS)	Houston, Tex.
8	19,079	England	July 19, 2025	Audi Field (MLS)	Washington D.C.
9	18,700	Māori All Blacks	November 4, 2016	Toyota Park (Note: Now known as SeatGeek Stadium.) (MLS)	Bridgeview, Ill.
10	18,500	Māori All Blacks	November 9, 2013	PPL Park (Note: Now known as Talen Energy Stadium.) (MLS)	Chester, Pa.
11	17,418	Scotland	July 12, 2024	Audi Field (MLS)	Washington D.C.
12	17,214	Italy	June 3, 2012	BBVA Compass Stadium (MLS)	Houston, Tex.
13	14,000	New Zealand XV	October 9, 1980	San Diego Stadium (Note: Now known as SDCCU Stadium.) (NFL)	San Diego, Calif.
14	13,591	Chile	February 20, 2016	Lockhart Stadium (Note: Demolished in 2019 and replaced on-site by Inter Miami CF Stadium.) (NASL)	Fort Lauderdale, Fla.
15	13,000	South Africa	December 1, 2001	Robertson Stadium (Note: Demolished in 2012 and replaced on-site by TDECU Stadium.) (FBS)	Houston, Tex.
16	11,300	Scotland	June 16, 2018	BBVA Compass Stadium (MLS)	Houston, Tex.
17	est. 10,500	Portugal	July 4, 2026	Dick's Sporting Goods Park (MLS)	Commerce City, CO
18	10,241	Argentina XV	February 6, 2016	BBVA Compass Stadium (MLS)	Houston, Tex.

== Other U.S. national teams ==
=== USA Falcons ===
Americas Rugby Championship
Year	Champion	U.S. result
2009	Argentina Jaguars	4th
2010	Argentina Jaguars	3rd
2011	Not held due to the 2011 Rugby World Cup	
2012	Argentina Jaguars	4th
2013	Argentina Jaguars	2nd
2014	Argentina Jaguars	2nd
2015	Not held due to the 2015 Rugby World Cup	

The USA Falcons, formerly the USA Selects is the second national rugby team for the United States. The USA Falcons is a developmental team, usually fielding younger players looking to break into the U.S. national team, and sometimes including amateur domestic U.S. national team players who need more high-level matches.

The USA Selects formerly participated in the Americas Rugby Championship, when the tournament only featured "A" sides for Argentina, Canada, the United States, and Uruguay. The USA Selects best results in the ARC were their second-place finishes in 2013 and 2014 Since 2016, the ARC only features an A team from Argentina along with the national sides of Brazil, Canada, Chile, Uruguay, and the United States. The USA Falcons now play in a separate tournament known as the Americas Pacific Challenge.

=== Women's national team ===
The U.S. women's national team, officially formed in 1987, has been an international powerhouse since its inception, although more recently have fallen behind other powerhouses such as England and New Zealand on the world rankings. The Eagles won the first official World Cup in 1991, and finished second in the two following World Cups (1994, 1998). The Eagles have set a high standard for international competition, leading an ensuing wave of women's rugby growth and game development worldwide. The US finished 7th in the 2002 tournament. The women's national team traveled to the United Kingdom in January 2006 to play Scotland, Ireland and England, winning all three games. The 2006 Women's Rugby World Cup was held in Edmonton, Canada.

== See also ==
- Rugby union in the United States
- USA Rugby
- United States national rugby sevens team
- United States national under-20 rugby union team
- List of United States national rugby union players
- Rugby World Cup
- American Cougars
