= Inoke Ravuiwasa =

Fijian rugby union player

- Born: 4 September 1996 (age 30) Taveuni, Fiji
- Height: 183 cm (6 ft 0 in)
- Weight: 115 kg (254 lb; 18 st 2 lb)
- School: Ratu Kadavulevu School

Rugby union career
- Position: Prop
- Current team: Drua
Senior career
Years	Team	Apps	(Points)
2027–	Drua	0	(0)
- Correct as of 2 November 2026
International career
Years	Team	Apps	(Points)
2026–	Fiji	2	(0)
- Correct as of 2 November 2026

Inoke Ravuiwasa (born 4 September 1996) is a Fijian rugby union player, who plays for the Drua. His preferred position is prop.

== Early career ==
Ravuiwasa was born in Tavuki, Taveuni and attended Ratu Kadavulevu School. He represented Fiji at U20 level in 2016, and played his Skipper Cup rugby for the Police and Suva. In 2026, he moved to Australia to play club rugby in Canberra for Western District Lions.

== Professional career ==
In August 2026, Ravuiwasa was announced as signing for the Drua, before later being named in their squad for the 2027 Super Rugby Pacific season.

In August 2026, Ravuiwasa was named in the Fiji squad for the 2026 World Rugby Pacific Nations Cup. He made his debut for the national side against Canada.
