= Tonga Kofe =

USA international rugby union player

- Born: 2 February 1996 (age 30) Portland, Oregon
- Height: 6 ft 2 in (1.88 m)
- Weight: 143 kg (315 lb; 22 st 7 lb)
- University: Portland State University

Rugby union career
- Position: Prop
- Current team: California Legion
Senior career
Years	Team	Apps	(Points)
2024–2025	Utah Warriors	22	(12)
2025–2026	Leicester Tigers	3	(0)
- Correct as of 7 February 2026
International career
Years	Team	Apps	(Points)
2025–	United States	6	(0)
- Correct as of 2 March 2026

Semise "Tonga" Kofe is an American professional rugby union player, who plays as a Prop for California Legion in Major League Rugby and the United States men's national rugby union team. He previously played for Utah Warriors in MLR and Leicester Tigers in Premiership Rugby.

== Club career ==
Tonga Kofe played for the Utah Warriors in Major League Rugby during the 2024 and 2025 seasons. He made 16 appearances in 2025, including scoring 2 tries, as the Utah Warriors finished top of the Western conference, before losing in the Western Conference final. He was named to the All-MLR Second XV team of the season.

He joined Leicester Tigers in August 2025.

== International career ==
Tonga Kofe made his debut for the US in July 2025 in a win against Belgium. He was named in the USA's squad for the Pacific Nations Cup.
