= Mitch Wilson (rugby union) =

American rugby union player

- Full name: Mitchell Wilson
- Born: 15 April 1996 (age 30) Sydney, Australia
- Height: 174 cm (5 ft 9 in)
- Weight: 77 kg (170 lb; 12 st 2 lb)

Rugby union career
- Position: Wing / fullback
- Current team: Anthem RC
Amateur team(s)
Years	Team	Apps	(Points)
2021-	Mystic River Rugby Club		
Senior career
Years	Team	Apps	(Points)
2020–2024	New England Free Jacks	58	(102)
2025	Anthem RC	11	(47)
2026-	New England Free Jacks	10	(0)
- Correct as of 10 November 2026
International career
Years	Team	Apps	(Points)
2016	USA U20		
2018–2019	USA Selects		
2022–	United States	19	(26)
- Correct as of 10 November 2026

Mitch Wilson (born 15 April 1996) is an Australian-born American rugby union player, currently playing for the New England Free Jacks in Major League Rugby (MLR). His preferred position is wing or fullback.

== Early career ==
Wilson is from Sydney in Australia. He grew up playing rugby league for Emu Plain Rugby League Club. He started playing rugby at the under-six level and continued at Emu Plain until he was 14 years old.

His family moved to Oviedo, Florida when he was 15. He attended Life University from 2015 to 2019. He served as captain for his last three years, and earned another four All-American nods. He won three D1A national championships, in 2017, 2018 and 2019. He also played with Mystic River Rugby Club in the American Rugby Premiership.

Wilson served as an assistant coach for Dartmouth College in the fall of 2019.

== Professional career ==
Wilson joined the New England Free Jacks ahead of the 2020 Major League Rugby season. He was the first player in Free Jacks history to score a trie. During the 2021 season Wilson appeared in nine matches for the club scoring three tries and one penalty for 18 points. During the 2022 season, Wilson appeared in 15 matches, scoring seven tries, four penalties and two conversions for 49 points overall. This led to him being named to the All Major League Rugby first team at the end of the season. In September 2022, he signed a two year contract extension with the Free Jacks. He appeared in 13 matches during the 2023 season scoring four tries, the following year he appeared in 17 matches scoring one tries. Both years he helped the club win the MLR championship in 2023 and 2024. On May 15, 2024, he made his 50th cap for the club.

In 2025 he signed with Anthem RC, appearing in 11 games, he scored 47 points (one trie, four penalties and 14 conversions.

In December of 2025, it was announced Wilson would return to the New England Free Jacks for the 2026 season.

== International career ==
Wilson represented the USA U20 team in 2016, before earning selection for the USA Selects in 2018 and 2019. He made his debut for the full United States side in 2022, making his debut against Kenya. Wilson was selected for the United States side in the 2025 and 2026 Pacific Nations cup along with the 2026 Nations Cup.

== Honours ==
New England Free Jacks

- Major League Rugby Championship: (2023, 2024)
- All MLR first team (2022)

== Personal life ==
Wilson graduated university with magna cum laude honours, earning a BA in Business Administration.
