= Sam Golla =

US international rugby union player

- Born: May 7, 1999 (age 27) Arlington, Texas, United States
- School: East High School
- University: UC Berkeley

Rugby union career
- Position: Lock / Flanker
Senior career
Years	Team	Apps	(Points)
2023–	Dallas Jackals		
International career
Years	Team	Apps	(Points)
2023–	United States	5	(0)

Sam Golla (born May 7, 1999) is an American international rugby union player.

A forward, Golla was born in Arlington, Texas and grew up in Denver, where he attended East High School, where he won two Colorado state championships, including as a captain his senior year. He played varsity rugby at UC Berkeley.

Golla was signed by the Dallas Jackals in 2022 as the No. 1 overall pick in the Major League Rugby college draft.

In 2023, Golla was named Major League Rugby "Rookie of the Year" and made his international debut for the United States in a Test against Romania in Bucharest, which they won by 14 points.

== See also ==
- List of United States national rugby union players
