= Mamoru Harada =

Japanese rugby union player

- Full name: Mamoru Harada
- Born: 15 April 1999 (age 27) Japan
- Height: 1.75 m (5 ft 9 in)
- Weight: 101 kg (15 st 13 lb; 223 lb)

Rugby union career
- Position: Hooker
- Current team: Toshiba Brave Lupus
Senior career
| Years | Team | Apps | (Points) |
| 2020 | Sunwolves | 0 | (0) |
| 2022–2025 2026– | Toshiba Brave Lupus | 55 | (60) |
| 2026 | Moana Pasifika | 8 | (0) |
- Correct as of 1 June 2025
International career
| Years | Team | Apps | (Points) |
| 2019 | Japan U20 | 7 | (10) |
| 2024– | Japan | 23 | (25) |
- Correct as of 1 June 2022

Mamoru Harada (原田 衛, Mamoru Harada; born 15 April 1999) is a Japanese rugby union player who plays as a hooker. He most recently played for Moana Pasifika.
