= Shilo Klein =

US international rugby union player

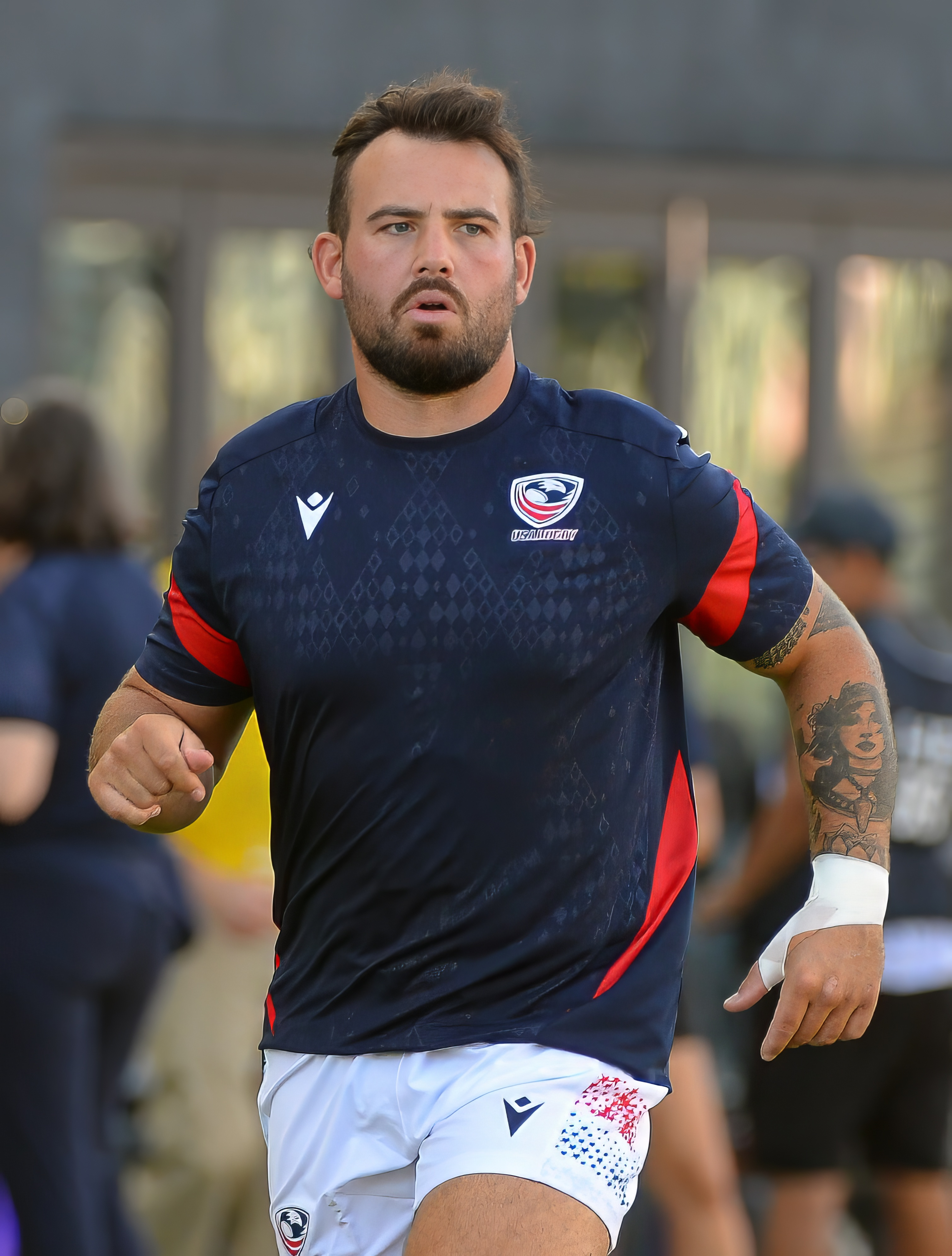
- Klein with United States men's national rugby union team in 2026
- Born: 4 May 1999 (age 27) Sacramento, California, United States
- Height: 180 cm (5 ft 11 in)
- Weight: 108 kg (238 lb; 17 st 0 lb)
- School: St. Andrews College

Rugby union career
- Position: Hooker
- Current team: Zebre Parma
Senior career
| Years | Team | Apps | (Points) |
| 2018-2022 | Canterbury | 23 | (15) |
| 2022-2022 | Crusaders | 5 | (5) |
| 2022-2024 | North Harbour | 20 | (5) |
| 2024-2025 | San Diego Legion | 31 | (62) |
| 2025-2026 | Zebre Parma | 5 | (0) |
- Correct as of 28 November 2024
International career
| Years | Team | Apps | (Points) |
| 2019 | New Zealand U20 | 5 | (5) |
| 2024– | United States | 2 | |
- Correct as of 28 November 2024

Shilo Klein is a rugby union player who plays for Italian team Zebre Parma in United Rugby Championship (URC). His playing position is hooker.

As club career he played in the past for the Crusaders in Super Rugby and for San Diego Legion in American Major League Rugby.

Klein was born in the United States. He was brought up in Christchurch, New Zealand, where he attended St. Andrews College. He played for the New Zealand under-20 team, then switched and debuted for the United States team in 2024.
