= Dominic Besag =

US international rugby union player (born 2004)

- Born: August 6, 2004 (age 22) Danville, California
- Height: 6 ft (183 cm)
- Weight: 215 lb (98 kg)
- University: Saint Mary's College of California

Rugby union career
- Position: Center
International career
| Years | Team | Apps | (Points) |
| 2023– | United States | 18 | (25) |
- Correct as of 6 July 2025

Dominic Besag (born August 6, 2004) is an American international rugby union player who plays for the United States as a center.

A Danville, California native, Besag was educated at De La Salle High School and has played rugby from a young age, starting at the Danville Oaks. He attended Saint Mary's College and participated in the San Diego Legion academy.

Besag captained the United States under-20s team in 2023 and received a senior call-up that year for the Eagles' tour of Europe, making his debut off the bench in a Test match against Georgia in Tbilisi.

On July 16, 2026, it was widely reported that Besag had signed a deal with the Sharks. However, Besag later revealed that he was only on trial with the South African side for two weeks and never officially signed a deal.

== See also ==
- List of United States national rugby union players
