= Payton Telea-Ilalio =

American rugby union player

- Born: 17 August 1998 (age 28) San Francisco, California, United States
- Height: 180 cm (5 ft 11 in)
- Weight: 116 kg (256 lb; 18 st 4 lb)

Rugby union career
- Position: Prop
Senior career
| Years | Team | Apps | (Points) |
| 2022 | Austin Gilgronis | 5 | (10) |
| 2023 | American Raptors | | |
| 2024–2025 | San Diego Legion | 27 | (10) |
| 2026 | Anthem Carolina | | |
- Correct as of 8 December 2025
International career
| Years | Team | Apps | (Points) |
| 2024– | United States | 7 | (5) |
- Correct as of 8 December 2025

Payton Telea-Ilalio (born 17 August 1998) is an American rugby union player who played for the Anthem Carolina in Major League Rugby (MLR). His preferred position is prop.

== Early career ==
Telea-Ilalio is from San Francisco and attended Saint Mary's College of California, where he won the Rudy Scholz award in 2020. He represented the USA U20 side in 2018.

== Professional career ==
Telea-Ilalio signed his first professional contract for the Austin Gilgronis during the 2022 Major League Rugby season, scoring two tries on his debut. After the 'Gilgronis' were suspended, and then withdrew from competition, he joined the American Raptors ahead of the 2023 Super Rugby Americas season. He would return to the MLR ahead of the 2024 season, signing for San Diego Legion. He would remain in San Diego for the 2025 season, before joining Anthem Carolina ahead of the 2026 season.

Telea-Ilalio made his debut for the United States national team in September 2024, debuting against Samoa. He scored his first try against Japan the following September.
