= Michael Baska =

United States rugby union player

- Born: 17 November 1994 (age 31) Overland Park, Kansas, United States
- Height: 1.86 m (6 ft 1 in)
- Weight: 88 kg (13.9 st; 194 lb)

Rugby union career
- Position: Scrum-half
Senior career
Years	Team	Apps	(Points)
2018–2019	New Orleans Gold	18	(20)
2020–	Utah Warriors	15	(20)
- Correct as of 4 July 2021
International career
Years	Team	Apps	(Points)
2021–	United States	2	(5)
- Correct as of 10 July 2021

Michael Baska (born 17 November 1994) is a United States rugby union player, currently playing for the Utah Warriors of Major League Rugby (MLR) and the United States national team. His preferred position is scrum-half.

== Professional career ==
Baska signed for Major League Rugby side Utah Warriors for the 2021 Major League Rugby season, having also played for the side in 2020, and played for the New Orleans Gold in 2018 and 2019.

Baska debuted for United States against England during the 2021 July rugby union tests.
