= Makeen Alikhan =

US international rugby union player

- Full name: Makeen Alikhan
- Born: 10 October 2001 (age 25) Vancouver, Canada
- Height: 189 cm (6 ft 2 in)
- Weight: 102 kg (225 lb; 16 st 1 lb)
- School: Epsom College
- University: University of Bristol

Rugby union career
- Position: Flanker
Youth career
- 20??–2021: Harlequins
Senior career
Years	Team	Apps	(Points)
2021–2024	Harlequins	4	(5)
2021–2023	→Worthing RFC (loan)	6	(5)
2024	→Dallas Jackals (loan)	13	(15)
2025-	Anthem RC	22	(20)
- Correct as of 16 August 2026
International career
Years	Team	Apps	(Points)
2020	USA under-20		
2025-	United States	9	(10)
2026	United States XV	1	(5)
- Correct as of 16 August 2026

Makeen Alikhan (born 10 October 2001) is a rugby union player who played for Anthem Rugby Carolina in the MLR. He also has played for the United States national rugby union team since 2025.

== Career ==
=== Club ===
Alikhan captained Epsom College 1st XV in the National Schools Champions Trophy, he was later named in the Schools Rugby 2019/20 Dream Team.

He signed his first professional contract with Harlequins in 2021, making his debut against Saracens in the Premiership Rugby Cup. His first try for Harlequins came in a 7-45 win over Oxford University. He made his debut for Worthing in a 17–0 win over Rochford Hundred.

He was named in the Dallas Jackals roster for the 2024 Major League Rugby season. His first appearance came in the second round of the 2024 MLR season, coming off the bench in the 48th minute, of a 23-30 loss against San Diego Legion. His first start came in a 27-30 loss against the Houston SaberCats, starting at openside flanker he scored a try in the 45' minute.

Ahead of the 2025 MLR season Alikhan joined Anthem RC, making his debut in the first round of the competition scoring a try against NOLA Gold.

=== International ===
On 15 May 2020, he was called up the USA under-20 squad. He was named in the USA Eagles Extended Player Squad for 2024. He scored a try on his Eagles debut in a win over Belgium in July 2025.
