= World Rugby Pacific Nations Cup =

Rugby union competition

- Current season, competition or edition: 2026 World Rugby Pacific Nations Cup
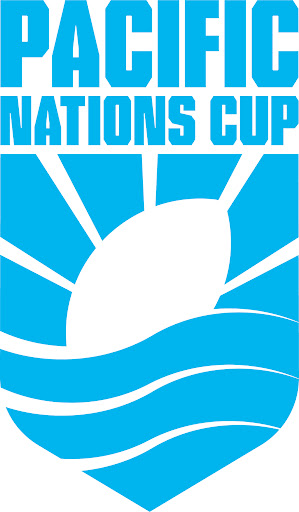
- Sport: Rugby union
- Founded: 2006; 20 years ago
- First season: 2006
- No. of teams: Canada; Fiji; Japan; Samoa; Tonga; United States
- Most recent champion: Japan (2026)
- Most titles: Fiji (7 titles)
- Website: world.rugby/pacific-nations-cup

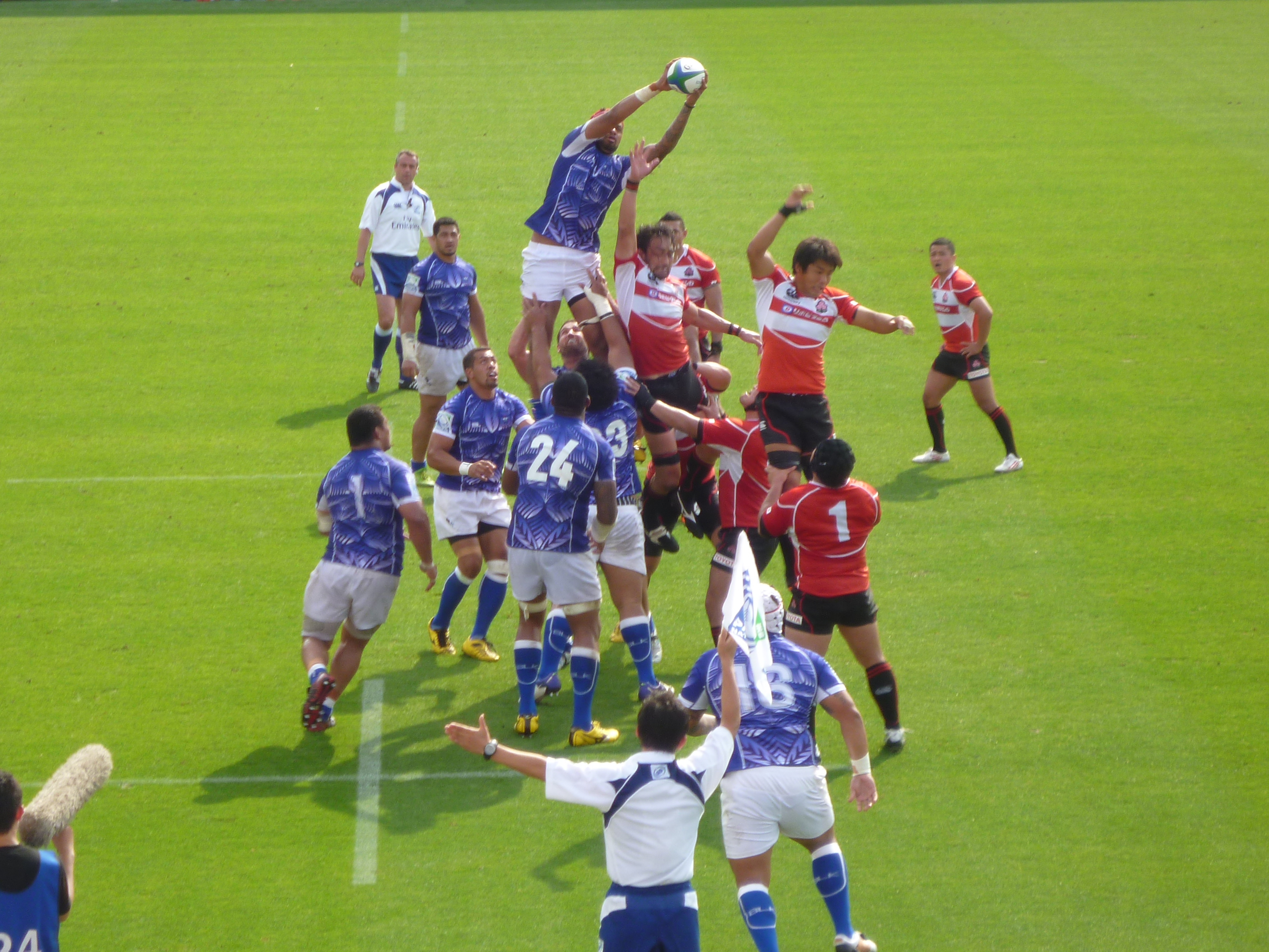
2012 Pacific Nations Cup match at Tokyo, in which Samoa defeated Japan 27–26.

The Pacific Nations Cup is an international rugby union competition held between Fiji, Samoa, Tonga, Canada, Japan and the United States. First held in 2006, the tournament is intended to strengthen the Tier 2 rugby teams by providing competitive test matches in a tournament format.

Former teams include the Junior All Blacks (2006, 2007, 2009), Australia A (2007, 2008, 2015), Georgia (2018) and the Māori All Blacks (2008). The inaugural tournament was the only one that carried the title of IRB Pacific 5 Nations; from 2007 the competition was known as the IRB Pacific Nations Cup and subsequently the World Rugby Pacific Nations Cup.

== Format ==
The tournament is a round-robin, where each team plays one match against each of the other teams. There are four points for a win, two points for a draw and none for a defeat. There are also bonus points offered with one bonus point for scoring four or more tries in a match and one bonus point for losing by 7 points or fewer.

The tournament generally occurs every year in the June mid-year international test window. The tournament was played mainly throughout June, with the last round in early July. The revised tournament begins in May due to pre-existing Test commitments and concludes in late June.

== History ==
The Pacific Nations Cup was funded as an International Rugby Board (IRB) tournament which was part of the $US50 million, three-year, global strategic investment programme launched in August 2005. The competition was aimed at developing the Pacific Rim sides in the second tier of the rugby countries: Fiji, Japan, Samoa and Tonga. The Junior All Blacks were also invited to compete, who are New Zealand's second XV. "The IRB Pacific 5 Nations is a tournament that will provide more certainty for Fiji, Japan, Samoa and Tonga in terms of regular high level Test match rugby, while also providing a high level of competition for the Junior All Blacks," said Mark Egan, the IRB's Head of Rugby Services.

In the first year only it was called the Pacific 5 Nations and did not include Australia. Australia had been invited to take part in the inaugural 2006 tournament but decided against sending a team stating that they wanted to focus on their domestic competition. The inaugural tournament kicked off 3 June 2006 and was played in a round-robin format, with some games being held in Australia. The Junior All Blacks won all of their matches en route to winning the 2006 tournament. The inaugural tournament was a success in providing a platform for Pacific states and Japan in gaining valuable exposure.

Australia A joined an expanded competition for the 2007 season. The inclusion of Australia A meant that the tier 2 teams would have an even greater number of matches in the buildup to the 2007 Rugby World Cup. For Australia, it provided a stepping stone for Wallaby selection. Following the 2008 tournament, however, the ARU announced Australia A would not play in 2009 due to the current economic environment. Australia has not participated again until 2022.

In 2008, the New Zealand Māori team replaced the Junior All Blacks in the competition. The New Zealand Rugby Union (NZRU) had decided that the New Zealand Māori needed to play more matches at home and that the Junior All Blacks would not be assembled in 2008 for reasons of "player welfare." The Junior All Blacks returned for the 2009 tournament, but no New Zealand team has participated since then.

From 2010 to 2012, the Pacific Nations Cup was a four-team tournament, contested by Japan, Fiji, Samoa and Tonga, with Samoa winning in 2010 and 2012, and Japan winning in 2011.

In January 2013, the IRB announced that both the United States and Canada teams would be joining the 2013 competition on a permanent basis. For the first time, the reigning champion Samoan team did not compete as they took part in a competition in South Africa.

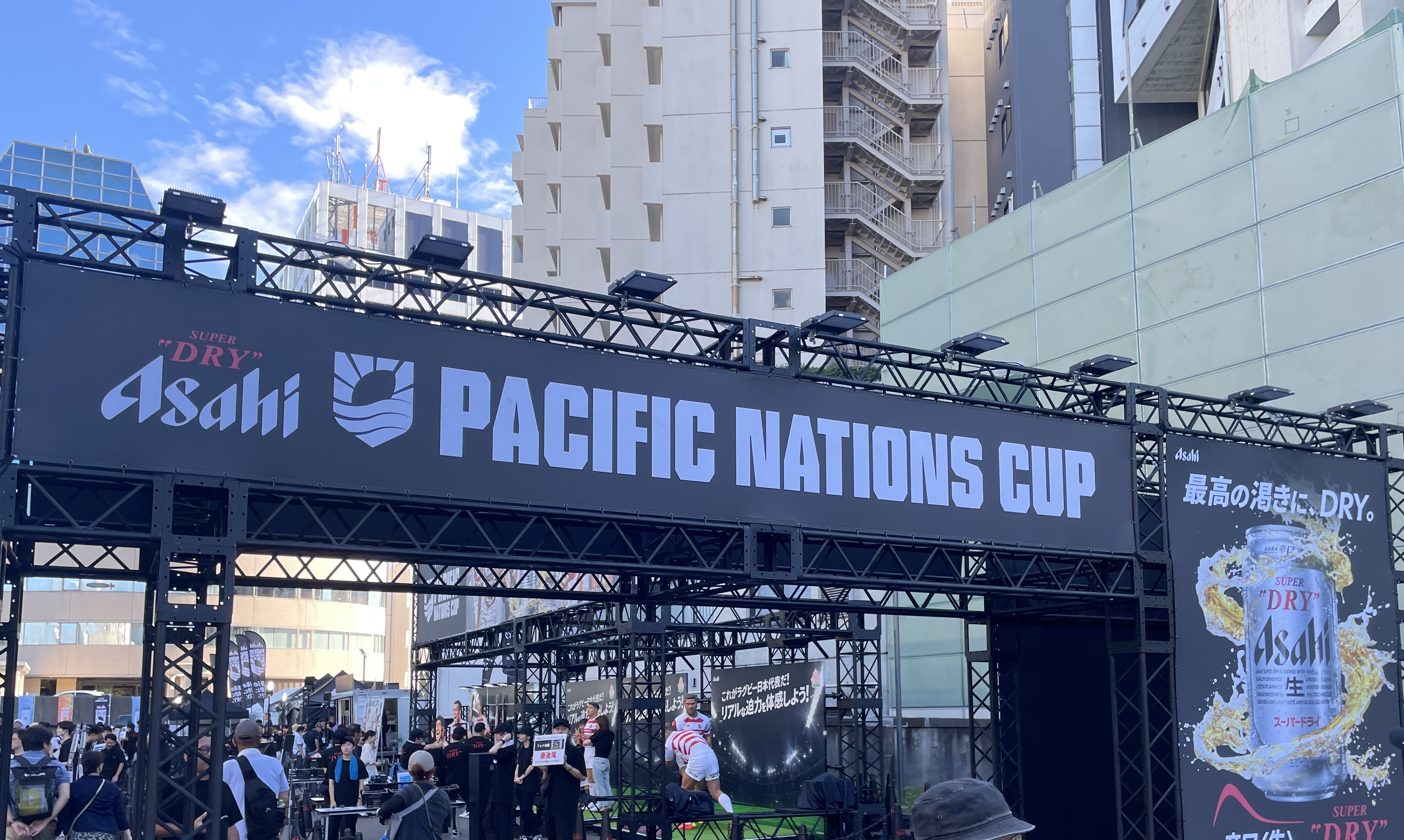
2024 Pacific Nations Cup advertising during the Finals series hosted in Japan.

The Pacific Nations Cup was downscaled for 2016 and 2017 with these two editions featuring only Fiji, Samoa and Tonga. The sides from Canada, Japan and United States played in their respective regional qualifiers for the 2019 Rugby World Cup. As part of the Oceanian qualification, places at the 2019 Rugby World Cup were awarded to the two top teams of the 2016 and 2017 PNC (on aggregate), whereas the bottom team played a repechage match against the second best Rugby Europe Championship team. Georgia was invited for the 2018 tournament hosted in Suva.

For 2019, Canada, Japan and the United States returned to the tournament, serving as a prelude to the 2019 Rugby World Cup. Japan won without losing a match.

The tournament was not held in 2020 or 2021, largely due to the COVID-19 pandemic and other related logistical issues. It was revived in 2022, with the ever-present Fiji, Samoa and Tonga being joined by Australia A. Samoa won all three matches, ahead of Australia A.

In October 2023, World Rugby announced that beginning in 2024 the Pacific Nations Cup will be contested by six permanent teams from North America, the Pacific, and Asia: Canada, Fiji, Japan, Samoa, Tonga, and the United States. The competition format would, however, be staged with a round-robin pool stage followed by a knockout stage (finals), hosted by Japan or the United States, to decide the tournament winner, unlike the previous format. In August 2024, it was revealed that the 2025 edition (finals hosted by the United States) of the Pacific Nations Cup would double as the qualification tournament for the newly expanded 2027 Rugby World Cup, merging North America and the Asia-Pacific regions, replacing the former regional qualification method. With this announcement, five of the six teams that compete in the Pacific Nations Cup will automatically qualify for the 2027 Rugby World Cup as Fiji and Japan had qualified via the 2023 Rugby World Cup Pool stage.

== Teams ==
=== 2006–2022 ===
The teams in the Pacific Nations Cup and their finishing positions are as follows:

Team	06	07	08	09	10	11	12	13	14	15	16	17	18	19	22
Pacific teams
Fiji	3rd	4th	4th	2nd	2nd	3rd	2nd	1st	2nd	1st	1st	1st	1st	2nd	3rd
Samoa	2nd	3rd	3rd	3rd	1st	4th	1st	—N/a	1st^{*}	2nd	2nd	3rd	4th	4th	1st
Tonga	4th	5th	6th	5th	4th	2nd	3rd	3rd	3rd	3rd	3rd	2nd	2nd	5th	4th
Other teams
Canada	—N/a	—N/a	—N/a	—N/a	—N/a	—N/a	—N/a	2nd	3rd	6th	—N/a	—N/a	—N/a	6th	—N/a
Japan	5th	6th	5th	4th	3rd	1st	4th	4th	1st^{*}	4th	—N/a	—N/a	—N/a	1st	—N/a
United States	—N/a	—N/a	—N/a	—N/a	—N/a	—N/a	—N/a	5th	2nd	5th	—N/a	—N/a	—N/a	3rd	—N/a
Former teams
Australia A	—N/a	2nd	2nd	—N/a	—N/a	—N/a	—N/a	—N/a	—N/a	—N/a	—N/a	—N/a	—N/a	—N/a	2nd
Georgia	—N/a	—N/a	—N/a	—N/a	—N/a	—N/a	—N/a	—N/a	—N/a	—N/a	—N/a	—N/a	3rd	—N/a	—N/a
Junior All Blacks	1st	1st	—N/a	1st	—N/a	—N/a	—N/a	—N/a	—N/a	—N/a	—N/a	—N/a	—N/a	—N/a	—N/a
(Māori people) New Zealand Māori	—N/a	—N/a	1st	—N/a	—N/a	—N/a	—N/a	—N/a	—N/a	—N/a	—N/a	—N/a	—N/a	—N/a	—N/a

=== 2024–present ===
The teams in the Pacific Nations Cup from the 2024 season and their finishing positions are as follows:

Team	24	25	26
Canada	6th	4th	3rd
Fiji	1st	1st	2nd
Japan	2nd	2nd	1st
Samoa	3rd	6th	—N/a
Tonga	5th	3rd	—N/a
United States	4th	5th	4th

Notes:

^ * The 2014 tournament was split into conferences without crossover matches or finals. Samoa and Japan won their respective conference titles.

== Commercial sponsorship ==
On 20 June 2008 the International Rugby Board announced that regional financial institution ANZ had agreed to become presenting sponsor of the competition, as well as the FORU Oceania Cup and the Pacific Rugby Cup.

On 16 August 2024, World Rugby and Asahi Breweries Limited announced that Asahi Super Dry would be the title sponsor and official beer of the competition.

== Results ==
Year	Finals host	Gold medal match			Bronze medal match			Teams
Year	Finals host	Gold medal	Score	Silver medal	Bronze medal	Score	Fourth place	Teams
2006	—N/a	Junior All Blacks	round-robin	Samoa	Fiji	round-robin	Tonga	5
2007	—N/a	Junior All Blacks	round-robin	Australia A	Samoa	round-robin	Fiji	6
2008	—N/a	New Zealand Māori	round-robin	Australia A	Samoa	round-robin	Fiji	6
2009	—N/a	Junior All Blacks	round-robin	Fiji	Samoa	round-robin	Japan	5
2010	—N/a	Samoa	round-robin	Fiji	Japan	round-robin	Tonga	4
2011	—N/a	Japan	round-robin	Tonga	Fiji	round-robin	Samoa	4
2012	—N/a	Samoa	round-robin	Fiji	Tonga	round-robin	Japan	4
2013	—N/a	Fiji	round-robin	Canada	Tonga	round-robin	Japan	5
2014 (Note: In 2014, the Pacific Nations Cup was played between two conferences (Asia/Pacific, Pacific Islands).)	—N/a	Japan Samoa	round-robin; two conferences	United States Fiji	Canada Tonga	round-robin; two conferences	—N/a	6
2015	Canada	Fiji	39–29; Swangard Stadium, Burnaby	Samoa	Tonga	31–20; Swangard Stadium, Burnaby	Japan	6
2016	—N/a	Fiji	round-robin	Samoa	Tonga	round-robin	—N/a	3
2017	—N/a	Fiji	round-robin	Tonga	Samoa	round-robin	—N/a	3
2018	—N/a	Fiji	round-robin	Tonga	Georgia	round-robin	Samoa	4
2019	—N/a	Japan	round-robin	Fiji	United States	round-robin	Samoa	6
2022	—N/a	Samoa	round-robin	Australia A	Fiji	round-robin	Tonga	4
2024	Japan	Fiji	41–17; Hanazono Stadium, Higashiōsaka	Japan	Samoa	18–13; Hanazono Stadium, Higashiōsaka	United States	6
2025	United States	Fiji	33–27; America First Field, Salt Lake City	Japan	Tonga	35–24; America First Field, Salt Lake City	Canada	6
2026	Japan	Japan	20–15; Chichibunomiya Stadium, Tokyo	Fiji	Canada	19–16; Chichibunomiya Stadium, Tokyo	United States	4

=== Champions record ===
Team	Champions	Runners-up	Third	Fourth
Fiji	7 (2013, 2015, 2016, 2017, 2018, 2024, 2025)	6 (2009, 2010, 2012, 2014*, 2019, 2026)	3 (2006, 2011, 2022)	2 (2007, 2008)
Samoa	4 (2010, 2012, 2014*, 2022)	3 (2006, 2015, 2016)	5 (2007, 2008, 2009, 2017, 2024)	3 (2011, 2018, 2019)
Japan	4 (2011, 2014*, 2019, 2026)	2 (2024, 2025)	1 (2010)	4 (2009, 2012, 2013, 2015)
Junior All Blacks	3 (2006, 2007, 2009)	—N/a	—N/a	—N/a
New Zealand Māori	1 (2008)	—N/a	—N/a	—N/a
Tonga	—N/a	3 (2011, 2017, 2018)	6 (2012, 2013, 2014*, 2015, 2016, 2025)	3 (2006, 2010, 2022)
Australia A	—N/a	3 (2007, 2008, 2022)	—N/a	—N/a
Canada	—N/a	1 (2013)	2 (2014*, 2026)	1 (2025)
United States	—N/a	1 (2014*)	1 (2019)	2 (2024, 2026)
Georgia	—N/a	—N/a	1 (2018)	—N/a
*The 2014 tournament was split into conferences without crossover matches or finals. Samoa and Japan won their respective conference titles and thus were declared joint champions.

=== Summary ===
Pacific Nations Overall Table (2006–2026)
Team	P	W	D	L	W%	PF	PA	Diff.	TF	TA	TB	LB	Pts
Fiji	59	38	2	19	64.41%	1,560	1,240	+320	202	146	27	9	192
Samoa	52	25	2	25	48.08%	1,177	1,154	+23	139	132	12	8	124
Japan	50	23	0	27	46%	1,290	1,416	−126	155	190	18	8	118
Tonga	56	18	1	37	32.14%	1,169	1,652	−483	138	201	10	11	95
Junior All Blacks	13	13	0	0	100%	556	160	+396	80	21	12	0	64
Australia A	13	9	1	3	69.23%	489	252	+237	66	31	8	2	48
United States	22	7	0	15	31.82%	436	600	−164	45	75	5	4	37
Canada	22	5	0	17	22.73%	448	693	−245	55	85	5	4	29
New Zealand Māori	5	5	0	0	100%	134	62	+72	18	10	1	0	21
Georgia	2	1	0	1	50%	31	52	−21	3	8	0	0	4

Updated: 24 September 2026
W is 4 points. D is 2 points. 1 bonus point given for TB or LB.
Points and bonus points tally includes playoff matches.

== Top scorers ==
The following tables contain points and tries scored in the Pacific Nations Cup.

=== Top points scorers ===
Rank	Player	Team	Points
1	Kurt Morath	Tonga	188
2	Lee Seung-Sin	Japan	143
3	Ayumu Goromaru	Japan	142
4	Seremaia Bai	Fiji	130
5	Taniela Rawaqa	Fiji	103
6	James Arlidge	Japan	102
7	Caleb Muntz	Fiji	99
8	Ben Volavola	Fiji	97
9	Sonatane Takulua	Tonga	86
10	AJ MacGinty	United States	82

Last updated: 19 September 2026
Source: statbunker.com

=== Top try scorers ===
Rank	Player	Team	Tries
1	David Lemi	Samoa	11
2	Hosea Gear	Junior All Blacks	10
3	Tevita Ikanivere	Fiji	8
3	Sonatane Takulua	Tonga	8
3	Anthony Tuitavake	Junior All Blacks	8
6	Takashi Kikutani	Japan	7
6	Leone Nakarawa	Fiji	7
6	Dylan Riley	Japan	7
6	Hendrick Tui	Japan	7
6	Lachlan Turner	Australia A	7
6	Fetuʻu Vainikolo	Tonga	7

Last updated: 19 September 2026
Source: statbunker.com

== Venues ==
Below is a table listing all the venues that have been used in the tournaments, listed with the number of matches each venue has hosted annually and historically:

Table updated to 2026 tournament

Stadium	Location	Years (No. of Matches)	Total
America First Field	(United States) Salt Lake City	2025 (2)	2
Apia Park	(Samoa) Apia	2007 (3), 2008 (2), 2009 (1), 2010 (5), 2014 (1), 2016 (1), 2017 (1), 2019 (1), 2024 (1)	16
Avaya Stadium	(United States) San Jose	2015 (2)	2
Ballymore Stadium	(Australia) Brisbane	2008 (1)	1
BC Place	(Canada) Vancouver	2024 (1)	1
BCU International Stadium	(Australia) Coffs Harbour	2007 (2)	2
BMO Field	(Canada) Toronto	2015 (3)	3
Carisbrook	(New Zealand) Dunedin	2006 (1), 2007 (1)	2
Central Coast Stadium	(Australia) Gosford	2006 (2)	2
Chichibunomiya Rugby Stadium	(Japan) Tokyo	2007 (1), 2011 (1), 2012 (3), 2013 (2), 2024 (3), 2026 (2)	12
Churchill Park	(Fiji) Lautoka	2007 (2), 2008 (2), 2009 (5), 2010 (1), 2011 (3), 2012 (1), 2013 (1), 2014 (1), 2019 (1), 2022 (4)	20
Dairy Farmers Stadium	(Australia) Townsville	2007 (1)	1
Dick's Sporting Goods Park	(United States) Denver	2025 (3)	3
Ellerslie Rugby Park	(Canada) Edmonton	2014 (1)	1
Hanazono Rugby Stadium	(Japan) Higashiōsaka	2019 (1), 2024 (2), 2026 (2)	5
Heart Health Park	(United States) California	2014 (1), 2015 (2), 2025 (1)	4
HFC Bank Stadium	(Fiji) Suva	2006 (2), 2007 (2), 2009 (2), 2011 (2), 2014 (1), 2015 (1), 2016 (2), 2018 (4), 2019 (4), 2022 (2), 2024 (1), 2025 (1)	24
Honjō Athletic Stadium	(Japan) Kitakyushu	2006 (1)	1
Infinity Park	(United States) Glendale	2019 (1)	1
Kamaishi Recovery Memorial Stadium	(Japan) Kamaishi	2019 (1)	1
Kumagaya Rugby Ground	(Japan) Kamaishi	2024 (1)	1
Lawaqa Park	(Fiji) Sigatoka	2009 (1)	1
Level-5 Stadium	(Japan) Fukuoka	2008 (1)	1
McLean Park	(New Zealand) Napier	2008 (1)	1
McMahon Stadium	(Canada) Calgary	2025 (1)	1
Mizuho Rugby Stadium	(Japan) Nagoya	2012 (2), 2013 (2)	4
Nagai Stadium	(Japan) Osaka	2006 (1)	1
Nippatsu Mitsuzawa Stadium	(Japan) Kanagawa	2013 (1)	1
North Harbour Stadium	(New Zealand) Auckland	2006 (1), 2008 (1)	2
North Sydney Oval	(Australia) Sydney	2008 (1)	1
Olympic Stadium	(Japan) Tokyo	2008 (1)	1
Richardson Memorial Stadium	(Canada) Kingston, Ontario	2013 (1)	1
Rotorua International Stadium	(New Zealand) Rotorua	2025 (1)	1
Sendai Stadium	(Japan) Sendai	2007 (1), 2008 (1)	2
Sydney Football Stadium	(Australia) Sydney	2007 (1), 2008 (1)	2
StubHub Center	(United States) Los Angeles	2013 (1), 2014 (1), 2024 (1)	3
Swangard Stadium	(Canada) British Columbia	2014 (1), 2015 (4)	5
Teufaiva Sport Stadium	(Tonga) Nukuʻalofa	2007 (1), 2008 (2), 2009 (1), 2017 (2), 2024 (1), 2025 (1)	8
Twin Elm Rugby Park	(Canada) Ottawa	2013 (1)	1
Waikato Stadium	(New Zealand) Waikato	2008 (1)	1
Yarrow Stadium	(New Zealand) New Plymouth	2006 (2)	2
Yurtec Stadium Sendai	(Japan) Sendai	2025 (1)	1

== See also ==
- World Rugby Pacific Challenge
