= 2024 World Rugby Pacific Nations Cup =

Rugby union competition

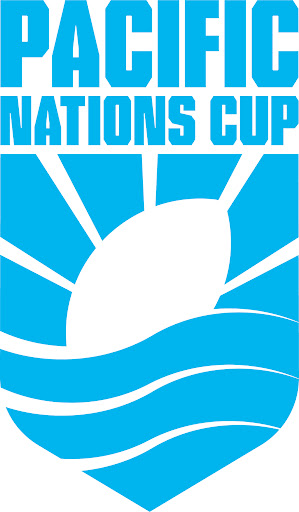

Tournament details
- Host: Japan (Finals)
- Dates: 23 August – 21 September 2024 (29 days)
- Teams: Canada; Fiji; Japan; Samoa; Tonga; United States

Final positions
- Champions: Fiji (6th title)
- Runner-up: Japan
- Third place: Samoa
- Fourth place: United States

Tournament statistics
- Matches played: 11
- Tries scored: 80 (7.27 per match)
- Top scorer(s): Lee Seung-sin (60)
- Most tries: Elia Canakaivata (4); Vuate Karawalevu (4); Dylan Riley (4)

The 2024 World Rugby Pacific Nations Cup (Note: Known as the Asahi Super Dry Pacific Nations Cup for sponsorship reasons.) was the sixteenth Pacific Nations Cup (PNC) tournament and the first with a new format design. Similar to the 2019 tournament, the same teams played each other, with the same round-robin structure. However, unlike 2019, the 2024 edition had a finals series following the pool stage (hosted in Japan), to decide the champion.

While Samoa, Fiji, Tonga and Japan did play each other in the lead-up to the 2023 Rugby World Cup, no official PNC tournament took place in 2023. As such, Samoa are the defending champions, having gone undefeated at the 2022 iteration of the tournament.

Fiji won the 2024 title, beating Japan in the Grand Final, 41–17.

== Pool stage ==
=== Pool A ===
Pos	Team	Pld	W	D	L	PF	PA	PD	TF	TA	TB	LB	Pts	Qualification
1	Fiji	2	2	0	0	92	35	+57	13	4	2	0	10	Advance to Semi-finals
2	Samoa	2	1	0	1	59	59	0	7	8	1	0	5	Advance to Semi-finals
3	Tonga	2	0	0	2	36	93	−57	5	13	0	0	0	

Source: World Rugby

23 August 2024
18:00 FJT (UTC+12)

(1 BP) Fiji	42–16	Samoa
Try: Salawa Jr. (3) 5' m, 55' c, 79' m Masi 30' c Lomani 60' c Karawalevu 74' m Con: Muntz (3/6) 31', 56', 61'; Pen: Muntz (2/2) 40', 44'	Report	Try: Leilua 17' c Con: Leuila (1/1) 18'; Pen: Leuila (3/3) 13', 27', 36'

HFC Stadium, Suva
Referee: James Doleman (New Zealand)

FB	15	Vuate Karawalevu
RW	14	Selestino Ravutaumada
OC	13	Iosefo Masi
IC	12	Inia Tabuavou		(substituted off) 73'
LW	11	Epeli Momo		(substituted off) 64'
FH	10	Caleb Muntz
SH	9	Frank Lomani		(substituted off) 67'
N8	8	Elia Canakaivata		(substituted off) 66'
OF	7	Kitione Salawa Jr.
BF	6	Meli Derenalagi
RL	5	Temo Mayanavanua	(yellow card) 35'
LL	4	Isoa Nasilasila		(substituted off) 66'
TP	3	Samu Tawake		(substituted off) 62'
HK	2	Tevita Ikanivere (c)		(substituted off) 66'
LP	1	Haereiti Hetet		(substituted off) 40'
Replacements:
HK	16	Mesu Dolokoto		(substituted on) 66'
PR	17	Eroni Mawi		(substituted on) 40'
PR	18	Peni Ravai		(substituted on) 62'
LK	19	Mesake Vocevoce		(substituted on) 66'
FL	20	Albert Tuisue		(substituted on) 66'
SH	21	Moses Sorovi		(substituted on) 67'
FH	22	Isaiah Armstrong-Ravula		(substituted on) 64'
CE	23	Apisalome Vota		(substituted on) 73'
Coach:
Mick Byrne

FB	15	Tomasi Alosio
RW	14	Tuna Tuitama	(yellow card) 65'
OC	13	Lalomilo Lalomilo
IC	12	Alapati Leiua
LW	11	Pisi Leilua		(substituted off) 64'
FH	10	D'Angelo Leuila		(substituted off) 67'
SH	9	Melani Matavao		(substituted off) 64'
N8	8	Olajuwon Noa		(substituted off) 38'
OF	7	Murphy Taramai
BF	6	Theo McFarland (c)
RL	5	Sam Slade
LL	4	Ben Nee-Nee		(substituted off) 72'
TP	3	Marco Fepulea'i		(substituted off) 23'
HK	2	Andrew Tuala		(substituted off) 54'
LP	1	Aki Seiuli		(substituted off) 72'
Replacements:
HK	16	Sama Malolo		(substituted on) 54'
PR	17	Tietie Tuimauga		(substituted on) 23'
PR	18	Brook Toomalatai		(substituted on) 72'
LK	19	Senio Toleafoa		(substituted on) 72'
FL	20	Jonah Mau'u		(substituted on) 38'
SH	21	Danny Tusitala		(substituted on) 64'
FH	22	Afa Moleli		(substituted on) 67'
CE	23	Stacey Ili		(substituted on) 64'
Coach:
Mahonri Schwalger

Assistant referees:
Angus Mabey (New Zealand)
Reuben Keane (Australia)
Television match official:
Richard Kelly (New Zealand)

Notes:

- Vuate Karawalevu (Fiji), Lalomilo Lalomilo, Jonah Mau'u, Brook Toomalatai and Tuna Tuitama (all Samoa) made their international debuts.

30 August 2024
17:00 WST (UTC+13)

(1 BP) Samoa	43–17	Tonga
Try: Ili 18' c Tuitama (2) 21' c, 42' c Moore-Aiono (2) 46' m, 74' c Slade 77' c Con: Leuila (3/4) 19', 22', 43'; Iona (2/2) 75', 78'; Pen: Leuila (1/2) 29'	Report	Try: Inisi (2) 57' c, 64' c Con: Pellegrini (2/2) 58', 64'; Pen: Pellegrini (1/1) 49'

Apia Park, Apia
Referee: Takehito Namekawa (Japan)

FB	15	Afa Moleli	(substituted off) 61'
RW	14	Tuna Tuitama
OC	13	Stacey Ili
IC	12	Alapati Leiua
LW	11	Tomasi Alosio
FH	10	D'Angelo Leuila	(substituted off) 53'
SH	9	Melani Matavao	(substituted off) 58'
N8	8	Iakopo Mapu	(substituted off) 56'
OF	7	Izaiha Moore-Aiono
BF	6	Theo McFarland (c)
RL	5	Sam Slade
LL	4	Ben Nee-Nee	(substituted off) 65'
TP	3	Tietie Tuimauga	(substituted off) 50'
HK	2	Sama Malolo	(substituted off) 62'
LP	1	Aki Seiuli	(substituted off) 72'
Replacements:
HK	16	Luteru Tolai	(substituted on) 62'
PR	17	Andrew Tuala	(substituted on) 72'
PR	18	Brook Toomalatai	(substituted on) 50'
LK	19	Michael Curry	(substituted on) 65'
FL	20	Jonah Mau'u	(substituted on) 56'
SH	21	Danny Tusitala	(substituted on) 58'
FH	22	Rodney Iona	(substituted on) 52'
CE	23	Lalomilo Lalomilo	(substituted on) 61'
Coach:
Mahonri Schwalger

FB	15	Nikolai Foliaki
RW	14	Esau Filimoehala	(substituted off) 45'
OC	13	Fine Inisi
IC	12	Fetuli Paea
LW	11	John Tapueluelu	(substituted off) 68'
FH	10	Patrick Pellegrini
SH	9	Manu Paea	(substituted off) 48'
N8	8	Lotu Inisi
OF	7	Hapakuki Moala-Liava'a	(substituted off) 58'
BF	6	Tupou Afungia
RL	5	Onehunga Havili	(substituted off) 48'
LL	4	Harison Mataele
TP	3	Ben Tameifuna (c)
HK	2	Penisoni Fineanganofo
LP	1	Tau Koloamatangi	(substituted off) 55'
Replacements:
HK	16	Solomone Aniseko
PR	17	Jethro Felemi	(substituted on) 55'
PR	18	Brandon Televave
LK	19	Tevita Ahokovi	(substituted on) 48'
FL	20	Sosefo Sakalia	(substituted on) 58'
SH	21	Aisea Halo	(substituted on) 48'
FH	22	Tyler Pulini	(substituted on) 68'
CE	23	Sam Tuitupou	(substituted on) 45'
Coach:
Tevita Tuʻifua

Assistant referees:
Angus Mabey (New Zealand)
Katsuki Furuse (Japan)

Notes:

- Tupou Afungia, Tevita Ahokovi, Esau Filimoehala, Penisoni Fineanganofo, and Sam Tuitupou (all Tonga) all made their international debuts.

6 September 2024
16:00 TOT (UTC+13)

Tonga	19–50	Fiji (1 BP)
Try: Paea 18' c F. Inisi 28' c Pellegrini 36' m Con: Pellegrini (2/3) 18', 29'	Report	Try: Masi (2) 2' m, 77' c Ikanivere 5' c Canakaivata (2) 11' c, 41' c Tabuavou 58' c Derenalagi 71' c Con: Muntz (6/7) 6', 12', 42', 59', 71', 78'; Pen: Muntz (1/1) 57'

Teufaiva Sport Stadium, Nukuʻalofa
Referee: Angus Gardner (Australia)

FB	15	Nikolai Foliaki
RW	14	Esau Filimoehala	(substituted off) 65'
OC	13	Fine Inisi	(substituted off) 65'
IC	12	Fetuli Paea
LW	11	Sam Tuitupou
FH	10	Patrick Pellegrini
SH	9	Aisea Halo	(substituted off) 64'
N8	8	Lotu Inisi
OF	7	Tupou Ma'afu Afungia	(substituted off) 60'
BF	6	Tevita Ahokovi
RL	5	Onehunga Havili	(substituted off) 47'
LL	4	Harison Mataele
TP	3	Ben Tameifuna (c)	(substituted off) 54'
HK	2	Solomone Aniseko	(substituted off) 51'
LP	1	Jethro Felemi	(substituted off) 51'
Replacements:
HK	16	Penisoni Fineanganofo	(substituted on) 51'
PR	17	Salesi Tuifua	(substituted on) 51'
PR	18	Brandon Televave	(substituted on) 54'
LK	19	Paea Fonoifua	(substituted on) 60'
FL	20	Sosefo Sakalia	(substituted on) 47'
SH	21	Siaosi Nai	(substituted on) 64'
FH	22	Tyler Pulini	(substituted on) 65'
WG	23	Latu Akauola	(substituted on) 65'
Coach:
Tevita Tuʻifua

FB	15	Isaiah Armstrong-Ravula
RW	14	Vuate Karawalevu
OC	13	Iosefo Masi
IC	12	Adrea Cocagi	(red card) 16'
LW	11	Epeli Momo		(substituted off) 51'
FH	10	Caleb Muntz
SH	9	Frank Lomani		(substituted off) 69'
N8	8	Albert Tuisue		(substituted off) 54'
OF	7	Elia Canakaivata
BF	6	Meli Derenalagi
RL	5	Temo Mayanavanua		(substituted off) 64'
LL	4	Mesake Vocevoce
TP	3	Samu Tawake		(substituted off) 54'
HK	2	Tevita Ikanivere (c)		(substituted off) 70'
LP	1	Eroni Mawi		(substituted off) 60'
Replacements:
HK	16	Mesu Dolokoto		(substituted on) 70'
PR	17	Haereiti Hetet		(substituted on) 60'
PR	18	Peni Ravai		(substituted on) 54'
LK	19	Ratu Rotuisolia		(substituted on) 64'
FL	20	Kitione Salawa Jr.		(substituted on) 54'
SH	21	Peni Matawalu		(substituted on) 69'
CE	22	Inia Tabuavou
FB	23	Ilaisa Droasese		(substituted on) 51'
Coach:
Mick Byrne

Assistant referees:
Reuben Keane (Australia)
George Myers (Australia)
Television match official:
Damon Murphy (Australia)

Notes:

- Siaosi Nai and Salesi Tuifua (both Tonga) made their international debut.
- Fiji scored the most points in a match against Tonga, surpassing the 47 points scored in 2003.

=== Pool B ===
Pos	Team	Pld	W	D	L	PF	PA	PD	TF	TA	TB	LB	Pts	Qualification
1	Japan	2	2	0	0	96	52	+44	13	7	2	0	10	Advance to Semi-finals
2	United States	2	1	0	1	52	56	−4	7	7	1	0	5	Advance to Semi-finals
3	Canada	2	0	0	2	43	83	−40	6	12	1	0	1	

Source: World Rugby

25 August 2024
14:00 PDT (UTC−07)

(1 BP) Canada	28–55	Japan (1 BP)
Try: Coe 37' c Rumball 45' c Tal. McMullin 50' c Tak. McMullin 80' c Con: Nelson (4/4) 38', 46', 51', 80'	Report	Try: Tuitama 4' c Dearns (2) 7' c, 28' c Shimokawa 22' c Riley 30' c Seung-sin 43' c Naikabula 68' m Osada 81' m Con: Seung-sin (6/6) 5', 8', 23', 29', 31', 44'; Pen: Seung-sin (1/1) 26'

BC Place, Vancouver
Referee: Eoghan Cross (Ireland)

FB	15	Cooper Coats	(substituted off) 60'
RW	14	Andrew Coe	(substituted off) 69'
OC	13	Ben LeSage
IC	12	Talon McMullin	(substituted off) 71'
LW	11	Nic Benn
FH	10	Peter Nelson
SH	9	Jason Higgins
N8	8	Lucas Rumball (c)
OF	7	Ethan Fryer	(substituted off) 66'
BF	6	Mason Flesch
RL	5	Kaden Duguid
LL	4	Izzak Kelly	(substituted off) 63'
TP	3	Conor Young	(substituted off) 57'
HK	2	Andrew Quattrin	(substituted off) 57'
LP	1	Calixto Martinez	(substituted off) 57'
Replacements:
HK	16	Dewald Kotze	(substituted on) 57'
PR	17	Djustice Sears-Duru	(substituted on) 57'
PR	18	Cole Keith	(substituted on) 57'
LK	19	James Stockwood	(substituted on) 63'
FL	20	Matthew Oworu	(substituted on) 66'
SH	21	Brock Gallagher	(substituted on) 71'
FH	22	Mark Balaski	(substituted on) 69'
CE	23	Takoda McMullin	(substituted on) 60'
Coach:
Kingsley Jones

FB	15	Yoshitaka Yazaki
RW	14	Jone Naikabula
OC	13	Dylan Riley
IC	12	Nicholas McCurran
LW	11	Malo Tuitama	(substituted off) 63'
FH	10	Lee Seung-sin	(substituted off) 63'
SH	9	Shinobu Fujiwara	(substituted off) 63'
N8	8	Faulua Makisi	(substituted off) 54'
OF	7	Kanji Shimokawa
BF	6	Tiennan Costley
RL	5	Warner Dearns
LL	4	Sanaila Waqa	(substituted off) 65'
TP	3	Keijiro Tamefusa	(substituted off) 47'
HK	2	Atsushi Sakate	(substituted off) 47'
LP	1	Shogo Miura	(substituted off) 47'
Replacements:
HK	16	Mamoru Harada	(substituted on) 47'
PR	17	Takayoshi Mohara	(substituted on) 47'
PR	18	Shuhei Takeuchi	(substituted on) 47'
LK	19	Eishin Kuwano	(substituted on) 65'
FL	20	Isaiah Collins-Mapusua	(substituted on) 54'
SH	21	Taiki Koyama	(substituted on) 63'
CE	22	Harumichi Tatekawa (c)	(substituted on) 63'
CE	23	Tomoki Osada	(substituted on) 63'
Coach:
Eddie Jones

Assistant referees:
Kat Roche (United States)
Luke Rogan (United States)
Television match official:
Derek Summers (United States)

Notes:

- Kaden Duguid (Canada), Isaiah Collins-Mapusua, Nicholas McCurran and Malo Tuitama (all Japan) made their international debuts.
- This was Japan's biggest victory against Canada in Canada (by margin).

31 August 2024
18:00 PDT (UTC−07)

(1 BP) United States	28–15	Canada
Try: Mooneyham (2) 9' m, 15' m Wilson 38' m Pifeleti 55' c Con: Carty (1/4) 56'; Pen: Carty (2/2) 7', 48'	Report	Try: Benn 26' m Coats 60' c Con: Nelson (1/2) 61'; Pen: Nelson (1/1) 4'

Dignity Health Sports Park, Carson
Referee: Gianluca Gnecchi (Italy)

FB	15	Mitch Wilson
RW	14	Conner Mooneyham
OC	13	Tavite Lopeti
IC	12	Tommaso Boni	(substituted off) 61'
LW	11	Nate Augspurger
FH	10	Luke Carty
SH	9	Juan-Philip Smith	(substituted off) 73'
N8	8	Jamason Faʻanana-Schultz	(substituted off) 61'
OF	7	Cory Daniel	(substituted off) 61'
BF	6	Paddy Ryan
RL	5	Greg Peterson (c)
LL	4	Jason Damm
TP	3	Alex Maughan	(substituted off) 61'
HK	2	Kapeli Pifeleti	(substituted off) 61'
LP	1	Jack Iscaro	(substituted off) 77'
Replacements:
HK	16	Sean McNulty	(substituted on) 61'
PR	17	Jake Turnbull	(substituted on) 77'
PR	18	Pono Davis	(substituted on) 61'
LK	19	Vili Helu	(substituted on) 61'
FL	20	Thomas Tu'avao	(substituted on) 61'
SH	21	Ethan McVeigh	(substituted on) 73'
FH	22	Dominic Besag	(substituted on) 61'
CE	23	Chris Mattina
Coach:
Scott Lawrence

FB	15	Andrew Coe
RW	14	Takoda McMullin
OC	13	Ben LeSage
IC	12	Talon McMullin		(substituted off) 56'
LW	11	Nic Benn
FH	10	Peter Nelson
SH	9	Jason Higgins
N8	8	Lucas Rumball (c)
OF	7	Ethan Fryer
BF	6	Mason Flesch
RL	5	Kaden Duguid		(substituted off) 69'
LL	4	Izzak Kelly		(substituted off) 42'
TP	3	Conor Young		(substituted off) 61'
HK	2	Andrew Quattrin		(substituted off) 66'
LP	1	Calixto Martinez	(yellow card) 47'				(substituted off) 66'
Replacements:
HK	16	Dewald Kotze		(substituted on) 66'
PR	17	Djustice Sears-Duru			(substituted on) 50'	(substituted off) 57'	(substituted on) 66'
PR	18	Cole Keith		(substituted on) 61'
LK	19	James Stockwood		(substituted on) 69'
FL	20	Matthew Oworu		(substituted on) 42'	(substituted off) 50'	(substituted on) 57'
SH	21	Brock Gallagher
FH	22	Mark Balaski
CE	23	Cooper Coats		(substituted on) 56'
Coach:
Kingsley Jones

Assistant referees:
Eoghan Cross (Ireland)
Federico Vedovelli (Italy)
Television match official:
Matteo Liperini (Italy)

Notes:

- Pono Davis and Sean McNulty (both United States) made their international debut.

7 September 2024
19:05 JST (UTC+09)

(1 BP) Japan	41–24	United States
Try: McCurran 14' c Waqa 22' c Harada 39' c Riley 44' c Tuitama 66' c Con: Seung-sin (5/5) 15', 23', 40', 45', 67'; Pen: Seung-sin (2/2) 5', 62'	Report	Try: Faʻanana-Schultz 30' c Augspurger (2) 51' c, 58' c Con: Carty (3/3) 31', 52', 59'; Pen: Carty (1/1) 18'

Kumagaya Rugby Ground, Kumagaya
Referee: Hollie Davidson (Scotland)

FB	15	Takuya Yamasawa	(substituted off) 53'
RW	14	Jone Naikabula	(substituted off) 49'
OC	13	Dylan Riley
IC	12	Nicholas McCurran
LW	11	Malo Tuitama
FH	10	Lee Seung-sin
SH	9	Shinobu Fujiwara	(substituted off) 64'
N8	8	Faulua Makisi	(substituted off) 51'
OF	7	Kanji Shimokawa
BF	6	Tiennan Costley
RL	5	Warner Dearns
LL	4	Sanaila Waqa	(substituted off) 59'
TP	3	Keijiro Tamefusa	(substituted off) 46'
HK	2	Atsushi Sakate	(substituted off) 38'
LP	1	Shogo Miura	(substituted off) 49'
Replacements:
HK	16	Mamoru Harada	(substituted on) 38'
PR	17	Takayoshi Mohara	(substituted on) 49'
PR	18	Shuhei Takeuchi	(substituted on) 46'
LK	19	Amato Fakatava	(substituted on) 59'
FL	20	Isaiah Collins-Mapusua	(substituted on) 51'
SH	21	Taiki Koyama	(substituted on) 64'
CE	22	Harumichi Tatekawa (c)	(substituted on) 53'
CE	23	Tomoki Osada	(substituted on) 49'
Coach:
Eddie Jones

FB	15	Mitch Wilson
RW	14	Conner Mooneyham
OC	13	Tavite Lopeti	(substituted off) 40'	(substituted on) 52'
IC	12	Tommaso Boni			(substituted off) 68'
LW	11	Nate Augspurger
FH	10	Luke Carty
SH	9	Ruben de Haas	(substituted off) 53'
N8	8	Jamason Faʻanana-Schultz	(substituted off) 71'
OF	7	Cory Daniel	(substituted off) 49'
BF	6	Paddy Ryan
RL	5	Greg Peterson (c)	(substituted off) 59'
LL	4	Vili Helu
TP	3	Alex Maughan	(substituted off) 46'
HK	2	Kapeli Pifeleti	(substituted off) 62'
LP	1	Jack Iscaro	(substituted off) 62'
Replacements:
HK	16	Sean McNulty	(substituted on) 62'
PR	17	Jake Turnbull	(substituted on) 62'
PR	18	Paul Mullen	(substituted on) 46'
LK	19	Jason Damm	(substituted on) 59'
FL	20	Thomas Tu'avao	(substituted on) 71'
FL	21	Moni Tongaʻuiha	(substituted on) 49'
SH	22	Juan-Philip Smith	(substituted on) 53'
CE	23	Dominic Besag	(substituted on) 40'	(substituted off) 52'	(substituted on) 68'
Coach:
Scott Lawrence

Assistant referees:
Sam Grove-White (Scotland)
Morgan White (Hong Kong)
Television match official:
Aaron Paterson (New Zealand)

== Finals series ==
=== Bracket ===
Semi-finals
14 September – Tokyo
Fiji	22
United States	3
15 September – Tokyo
Samoa	27
Japan	49

Grand Final
21 September – Higashiōsaka
Fiji	41
Japan	17
Bronze Final
21 September – Higashiōsaka
United States	13
Samoa	18

=== Fifth-place play-off ===
14 September 2024
16:00 JST (UTC+09)

Tonga	30–17	Canada
Try: Moala-Liava'a 10' c Tapueluelu (2) 15' c, 80' m Unga 26' m Con: Pellegrini (2/4) 11', 16'; Pen: Pellegrini (2/2) 47', 70'	Report	Try: Quattrin 20' c Tak. McMullin 67' c Con: Nelson (2/2) 21', 68'; Pen: Nelson (1/1) 6'

Chichibunomiya Rugby Stadium, Tokyo
Referee: Nic Berry (Australia)

FB	15	Josiah Unga
RW	14	Nikolai Foliaki		(substituted off) 75'
OC	13	Fine Inisi		(substituted off) 77'
IC	12	Fetuli Paea
LW	11	John Tapueluelu
FH	10	Patrick Pellegrini
SH	9	Aisea Halo		(substituted off) 75'
N8	8	Lotu Inisi
OF	7	Tupou Ma'afu Afungia		(substituted off) 65'
BF	6	Hapakuki Moala-Liava'a		(substituted off) 19'
RL	5	Tevita Ahokovi
LL	4	Harison Mataele		(substituted off) 54'
TP	3	Ben Tameifuna (c)		(substituted off) 58'
HK	2	Sosefo Sakalia		(substituted off) 73'
LP	1	Jethro Felemi	(yellow card) 19'			(substituted off) 54'
Replacements:
HK	16	Penisoni Fineanganofo		(substituted on) 73'
PR	17	Salesi Tuifua		(substituted on) 19'	(substituted off) 30'	(substituted on) 54'
PR	18	Tau Koloamatangi		(substituted on) 58'
LK	19	Kelemete Finau-Fetuli		(substituted on) 54'
FL	20	Vutulongo Puloka		(substituted on) 65'
SH	21	Manu Paea		(substituted on) 75'
WG	22	Latu Akauola		(substituted on) 75'
TBD	23	Kafaikamoana Vaea		(substituted on) 77'
Coach:
Tevita Tuʻifua

FB	15	Cooper Coats		(substituted off) 77'
RW	14	Andrew Coe
OC	13	Takoda McMullin
IC	12	Ben LeSage		(substituted off) 60'
LW	11	Josiah Morra
FH	10	Peter Nelson
SH	9	Jason Higgins		(substituted off) 75'
N8	8	Lucas Rumball (c)
OF	7	Ethan Fryer	(yellow card) 70'
BF	6	Matthew Oworu		(substituted off) 60'
RL	5	Mason Flesch
LL	4	Kaden Duguid		(substituted off) 71'
TP	3	Conor Young		(substituted off) 62'
HK	2	Andrew Quattrin		(substituted off) 68'
LP	1	Calixto Martinez		(substituted off) 32'
Replacements:
HK	16	Dewald Kotze		(substituted on) 68'
PR	17	Cole Keith		(substituted on) 32'
PR	18	Tyler Matchem		(substituted on) 62'
LK	19	Callum Botchar		(substituted on) 71'
FL	20	Siôn Parry		(substituted on) 60'
SH	21	Brock Gallagher		(substituted on) 75'
FH	22	Mark Balaski		(substituted on) 77'
CE	23	Talon McMullin		(substituted on) 60'
Coach:
Kingsley Jones

Assistant referees:
Takehito Namekawa (Japan)
Katsuki Furuse (Japan)
Television match official:
Damon Murphy (Australia)

Notes:

- Tyler Matchem (Canada), Vutulongo Puloka (Tonga), Josiah Unga (Tonga) and Kafaikamoana Vaea (Tonga) all made their international debut.

=== Semi-finals ===
14 September 2024
19:05 JST (UTC+09)

Fiji	22–3	United States
Try: Canakaivata (2) 26' c, 51' c Lomani 60' m Con: Muntz (2/3) 27', 52'; Pen: Muntz (1/1) 23'	Report	Pen: Mattina (1/2) 4'

Chichibunomiya Rugby Stadium, Tokyo
Referee: Craig Evans (Wales)

FB	15	Isaiah Armstrong-Ravula		(substituted off) 73'
RW	14	Vuate Karawalevu
OC	13	Iosefo Masi
IC	12	Inia Tabuavou
LW	11	Epeli Momo		(substituted off) 40'
FH	10	Caleb Muntz
SH	9	Frank Lomani		(substituted off) 68'
N8	8	Elia Canakaivata		(substituted off) 58'	(substituted off) 68'
OF	7	Kitione Salawa Jr.
BF	6	Meli Derenalagi
RL	5	Temo Mayanavanua
LL	4	Isoa Nasilasila
TP	3	Samu Tawake		(substituted off) 56'	(substituted off) 70'
HK	2	Tevita Ikanivere (c)	(yellow card) 55'	(substituted off) 67'
LP	1	Eroni Mawi		(substituted off) 56'
Replacements:
HK	16	Mesu Dolokoto		(substituted on) 67'
PR	17	Haereiti Hetet		(substituted on) 56'
PR	18	Peni Ravai		(substituted on) 56'	(substituted off) 70'
LK	19	Ratu Rotuisolia
FL	20	Albert Tuisue			(substituted on) 68'
SH	21	Peni Matawalu		(substituted on) 68'
CE	22	Apisalome Vota		(substituted on) 73'
FB	23	Ilaisa Droasese		(substituted on) 40'
Coach:
Mick Byrne

FB	15	Toby Fricker	(substituted off) 73'
RW	14	Conner Mooneyham
OC	13	Dominic Besag
IC	12	Tavite Lopeti
LW	11	Nate Augspurger (c)	(substituted off) 75'
FH	10	Chris Mattina
SH	9	Ruben de Haas	(substituted off) 39'
N8	8	Thomas Tu'avao
OF	7	Cory Daniel	(substituted off) 68'
BF	6	Paddy Ryan
RL	5	Jason Damm
LL	4	Vili Helu	(substituted off) 40'
TP	3	Paul Mullen	(substituted off) 35'
HK	2	Sean McNulty	(substituted off) 47'
LP	1	Jack Iscaro	(substituted off) 20'	(substituted on) 29'
Replacements:
HK	16	Kapeli Pifeleti	(substituted on) 47'
PR	17	Jake Turnbull	(substituted on) 20'	(substituted off) 29'
PR	18	Pono Davis	(substituted on) 35'
LK	19	Greg Peterson	(substituted on) 40'
FL	20	Moni Tongaʻuiha	(substituted on) 68'
CE	21	Bryce Campbell	(substituted on) 75'
WG	22	Rand Santos	(substituted on) 73'
CE	23	Juan-Philip Smith	(substituted on) 39'
Coach:
Scott Lawrence

Assistant referees:
Hollie Davidson (Scotland)
Sam Grove-White (Scotland)
Television match official:
Tual Trainini (France)

Notes:

- Rand Santos and Toby Fricker (both United States) made their international debut.

15 September 2024
15:05 JST (UTC+09)

Samoa	27–49	Japan
Try: Tuitama 13' c Matavao 52' c Lalomilo 72' c Con: Iona (3/3) 14', 53', 73'; Pen: Iona (2/2) 25', 29'	Report	Try: Riley 6' c Penalty try 10'; Osada 16' c Seung-sin 39' c Shimokawa 44' c Fujiwara 58' c Takahashi 79' c Con: Seung-sin (6/6) 7', 17', 40', 45', 59', 80'

Chichibunomiya Rugby Stadium, Tokyo
Referee: Paul Williams (New Zealand)

FB	15	Tomasi Alosio
RW	14	Tuna Tuitama
OC	13	Lalomilo Lalomilo
IC	12	Alapati Leiua		(substituted off) 59'
LW	11	Elisapeta Alofipo	(yellow card) 10'
FH	10	Rodney Iona
SH	9	Melani Matavao		(substituted off) 60'
N8	8	Iakopo Mapu
OF	7	Izaiha Moore-Aiono		(substituted off) 47'
BF	6	Theo McFarland (c)
RL	5	Sam Slade		(substituted off) 29'
LL	4	Ben Nee-Nee
TP	3	Marco Fepulea'i		(substituted off) 62'
HK	2	Sama Malolo		(substituted off) 61'
LP	1	Aki Seiuli		(substituted off) 64'
Replacements:
HK	16	Luteru Tolai		(substituted on) 61'
PR	17	Andrew Tuala		(substituted on) 64'
PR	18	Brook Toomalatai		(substituted on) 62'
LK	19	Michael Curry		(substituted on) 29'
FL	20	Murphy Taramai		(substituted on) 47'
SH	21	Danny Tusitala		(substituted on) 60'
FH	22	Afa Moleli
CE	23	Melani Nanai		(substituted on) 59'
Coach:
Mahonri Schwalger

FB	15	Lee Seung-sin
RW	14	Tomoki Osada
OC	13	Dylan Riley
IC	12	Nicholas McCurran	(substituted off) 70'
LW	11	Malo Tuitama
FH	10	Harumichi Tatekawa (c)	(substituted off) 62'
SH	9	Shinobu Fujiwara	(substituted off) 66'
N8	8	Faulua Makisi	(substituted off) 62'
OF	7	Kanji Shimokawa
BF	6	Amato Fakatava
RL	5	Warner Dearns
LL	4	Epineri Uluviti	(substituted off) 61'
TP	3	Shuhei Takeuchi	(substituted off) 62'
HK	2	Mamoru Harada	(substituted off) 75'
LP	1	Shogo Miura
Replacements:
HK	16	Kenta Matsuoka	(substituted on) 75'
PR	17	Takato Okabe
PR	18	Keijiro Tamefusa	(substituted on) 62'
LK	19	Isaiah Collins-Mapusua	(substituted on) 61'
FL	20	Tiennan Costley	(substituted on) 62'
SH	21	Taiki Koyama	(substituted on) 66'
CE	22	Yusuke Kajimura	(substituted on) 70'
CE	23	Taichi Takahashi	(substituted on) 62'
Coach:
Eddie Jones

Assistant referees:
Hollie Davidson (Scotland)
Sam Grove-White (Scotland)
Television match official:
Tual Trainini (France)

Notes:

- Elisapeta Alofipo and Melani Nanai (both Samoa) made their international debuts.

=== Bronze Final ===
21 September 2024
16:00 JST (UTC+09)

United States	13–18	Samoa
Try: Fricker 7' c Con: Carty (1/1) 8'; Pen: Carty (2/3) 5', 53'	Report	Try: Mapu 42' c Nanai 78' m Con: Iona (1/2) 43'; Pen: Iona (2/3) 15', 32'

Hanazono Rugby Stadium, Higashiōsaka
Referee: Ben O'Keeffe (New Zealand)

FB	15	Toby Fricker
RW	14	Conner Mooneyham
OC	13	Dominic Besag
IC	12	Tommaso Boni
LW	11	Mitch Wilson		(substituted off) 79'
FH	10	Luke Carty
SH	9	Juan-Philip Smith		(substituted off) 64'
N8	8	Jamason Faʻanana-Schultz		(substituted off) 59'
OF	7	Cory Daniel		(substituted off) 59'
BF	6	Paddy Ryan
RL	5	Greg Peterson (c)
LL	4	Jason Damm	(yellow card) 73'
TP	3	Alex Maughan		(substituted off) 50'
HK	2	Kapeli Pifeleti		(substituted off) 64'
LP	1	Jake Turnbull		(substituted off) 64'
Replacements:
HK	16	Sean McNulty		(substituted on) 64'
PR	17	Payton Telea-Ilalio		(substituted on) 64'
PR	18	Pono Davis		(substituted on) 50'
FL	19	Thomas Tu'avao		(substituted on) 59'
FL	20	Moni Tongaʻuiha		(substituted on) 59'
FL	21	Vili Helu		(substituted on) 64'
SH	22	Ethan McVeigh
FH	23	Rand Santos		(substituted on) 79'
Coach:
Scott Lawrence

FB	15	Tomasi Alosio
RW	14	Tuna Tuitama
OC	13	Lalomilo Lalomilo	(substituted off) 72'
IC	12	Alapati Leiua	(substituted off) 41'
LW	11	Elisapeta Alofipo
FH	10	Rodney Iona
SH	9	Melani Matavao	(substituted off) 62'
N8	8	Iakopo Mapu
OF	7	Izaiha Moore-Aiono	(substituted off) 58'
BF	6	Theo McFarland (c)
RL	5	Michael Curry	(substituted off) 47'
LL	4	Ben Nee-Nee
TP	3	Marco Fepulea'i	(substituted off) 79'
HK	2	Sama Malolo	(substituted off) 58'
LP	1	Aki Seiuli	(substituted off) 62'
Replacements:
HK	16	Luteru Tolai	(substituted on) 58'
PR	17	Andrew Tuala	(substituted on) 62'
PR	18	Brook Toomalatai	(substituted on) 79'
LK	19	Sam Slade	(substituted on) 47'
FL	20	Jonah Mau'u	(substituted on) 58'
SH	21	Danny Tusitala	(substituted on) 62'
FH	22	Afa Moleli	(substituted on) 72'
CE	23	Melani Nanai	(substituted on) 41'
Coach:
Mahonri Schwalger

Assistant referees:
Craig Evans (Wales)
Takehito Namekawa (Japan)
Television match official:
Tual Trainini (France)

=== Grand Final ===
21 September 2024
19:05 JST (UTC+09)

Fiji	41–17	Japan
Try: Karawalevu (2) 32' c, 70' c Loganimasi (2) 59' c, 75' c Tuisue 67' c Con: Muntz (5/5) 33', 60', 68', 71', 76'; Pen: Muntz (2/2) 10', 56'	Report	Try: Riley 20' c Tuitama 78' c Con: Seung-sin (2/2) 21', 78'; Pen: Seung-sin (1/1) 7'

Hanazono Rugby Stadium, Higashiōsaka
Referee: Nic Berry (Australia)

FB	15	Isaiah Armstrong-Ravula
RW	14	Vuate Karawalevu
OC	13	Iosefo Masi	(substituted off) 32'
IC	12	Inia Tabuavou
LW	11	Ilaisa Droasese	(substituted off) 57'
FH	10	Caleb Muntz
SH	9	Frank Lomani
N8	8	Elia Canakaivata	(substituted off) 63'
OF	7	Kitione Salawa Jr.	(substituted off) 28'
BF	6	Meli Derenalagi	(substituted off) 32'
RL	5	Temo Mayanavanua	(substituted off) 58'
LL	4	Isoa Nasilasila
TP	3	Samu Tawake	(substituted off) 68'
HK	2	Tevita Ikanivere (c)
LP	1	Eroni Mawi	(substituted off) 57'
Replacements:
HK	16	Mesu Dolokoto
PR	17	Haereiti Hetet
PR	18	Meli Tuni
LK	19	Mesake Vocevoce	(substituted on) 58'
FL	20	Albert Tuisue	(substituted off) 32'	(substituted on) 63'
SH	21	Peni Matawalu
CE	22	Apisalome Vota	(substituted on) 32'
FB	23	Ponepati Loganimasi	(substituted on) 57'
Coach:
Mick Byrne

FB	15	Lee Seung-sin
RW	14	Tomoki Osada
OC	13	Dylan Riley
IC	12	Nicholas McCurran		(substituted off) 61'
LW	11	Malo Tuitama
FH	10	Harumichi Tatekawa (c)		(substituted off) 52'
SH	9	Shinobu Fujiwara		(substituted off) 54'
N8	8	Faulua Makisi
OF	7	Kanji Shimokawa		(substituted off) 61'
BF	6	Amato Fakatava		(substituted off) 44'
RL	5	Warner Dearns
LL	4	Epineri Uluviti
TP	3	Shuhei Takeuchi		(substituted off) 46'
HK	2	Mamoru Harada	(yellow card) 38'		(substituted off) 69'
LP	1	Shogo Miura		(substituted off) 46'
Replacements:
HK	16	Kenta Matsuoka		(substituted off) 48'	(substituted on) 69'
PR	17	Takato Okabe		(substituted on) 46'
PR	18	Keijiro Tamefusa		(substituted on) 46'
LK	19	Isaiah Collins-Mapusua
FL	20	Tiennan Costley		(substituted on) 61'
SH	21	Taiki Koyama		(substituted on) 54'
CE	22	Yusuke Kajimura		(substituted on) 61'
CE	23	Junta Hamano		(substituted on) 52'
Coach:
Eddie Jones

Assistant referees:
Paul Williams (New Zealand)
Morgan White (Hong Kong)
Television match official:
Damon Murphy (Australia)

Notes:

- Ponepati Loganimasi (Fiji), and Junta Hamano (Japan) are all set for their international debut.

== Statistics ==
As of 21 September 2024.

=== Point scorers ===
Top point-scorers
Pos.	Player	Position	Tries	Con.	Pen.	Drop.	Points
1	Lee Seung-sin	Fly-half	2	19	4	0	60
2	Caleb Muntz	Fly-half	0	16	6	0	50
3	Patrick Pellegrini	Fly-half	1	6	3	0	26
4	Luke Carty	Fly-half	0	5	5	0	25
5	Rodney Iona	Fly-half	0	6	4	0	24
6	Elia Canakaivata	Number eight	4	0	0	0	20
6	D'Angelo Leuila	Number eight	0	4	4	0	20
6	Dylan Riley	Centre	4	0	0	0	20
6	Peter Nelson	Fly-half	0	7	2	0	20
10	Kitione Salawa Jr.	Back row	0	0	0	3	15

=== Try scorers ===
Top try-scorers
Pos.	Player	Position	Tries
1	Elia Canakaivata	Flanker	4
1	Dylan Riley	Centre	4
3	Iosefo Masi	Centre	3
3	Kitione Salawa Jr.	Flanker	3
3	Tuna Tuitama	Wing	3
3	Malo Tuitama	Wing	3
3	Vuate Karawalevu	Wing	3
7	three players		2

== Participants and squads ==
Caps and clubs as per the first match of the tournament (23 August 2024).

Team	Stadium			Coach	Captain	World Rugby Ranking	
Team	Home stadium	Capacity	Location	Coach	Captain	Start (Note: As at 19 August 2024.)	End (Note: As at 23 September 2024.)
Canada	BC Place	54,500	Vancouver, British Columbia	Kingsley Jones	Lucas Rumball	21st	22nd
Fiji	HFC Bank Stadium	15,000	Suva, Rewa	Mick Byrne	Tevita Ikanivere	10th	9th
Japan	Kumagaya Rugby Ground	30,000	Kumagaya, Saitama	Eddie Jones	Harumichi Tatekawa	14th	14th
Japan	Chichibunomiya Rugby Stadium	27,188	Aoyama, Tokyo (Semi-finals)	Eddie Jones	Harumichi Tatekawa	14th	14th
Japan	Hanazono Rugby Stadium	30,000	Higashiōsaka, Osaka (Grand Final)	Eddie Jones	Harumichi Tatekawa	14th	14th
Samoa	Apia Park	12,000	Apia, Tuamasaga	Mahonri Schwalger	Theo McFarland	13th	13th
Tonga	Teufaiva Sport Stadium	10,000	Nukuʻalofa, Tongatapu	Tevita Tuʻifua	Ben Tameifuna	16th	16th
United States	Dignity Health Sports Park	27,000	Carson, California	Scott Lawrence	Greg Peterson	19th	19th
United States	Dignity Health Sports Park	27,000	Carson, California	Scott Lawrence	Nate Augspurger	19th	19th

=== Canada ===
On 12 August, Canada name an initial 35-player squad ahead of the Pacific Nations Cup.

Tyler Matchem was called up on 12 September for Canada's Fifth-place play-off against Tonga.

Player	Position	Date of birth (age)	Caps	Club/province
Dewald Kotze	Hooker	14 June 1997 (aged 27)	1	(United States) Dallas Jackals
Jesse Mackail	Hooker	18 May 1996 (aged 28)	1	(Canada) Pacific Pride
Andrew Quattrin	Hooker	29 August 1996 (aged 27)	22	(United States) New England Free Jacks
Cole Keith	Prop	7 May 1997 (aged 27)	31	(United States) New England Free Jacks
Calixto Martinez	Prop	13 October 1996 (aged 27)	1	(United States) Old Glory DC
Sam Miller	Prop		0	(Canada) Pacific Pride
Tyler Matchem	Prop		0	(Canada) Pacific Pride
Liam Murray	Prop	17 October 1997 (aged 26)	10	(United States) Dallas Jackals
Conor Young	Prop	15 August 1995 (aged 29)	7	(United States) Los Angeles
Kaden Duguid	Lock	August 23, 1999 (aged 25)	0	(Canada) Vancouver Highlanders
Mason Flesch	Lock	18 November 1999 (aged 24)	8	(United States) Chicago Hounds
Izzak Kelly	Lock		4	(Australia) Cottesloe
Josh Larsen	Lock	April 4, 1994 (aged 30)	21	(United States) New England Free Jacks
James Stockwood	Lock		2	(Canada) Pacific Pride
Callum Botchar	Back row	October 3, 1997 (aged 26)	1	(United States) New Orleans Gold
Ethan Fryer	Back row	27 May 2001 (aged 23)	1	(United States) New England Free Jacks
Matt Klimchuk	Back row	30 April 2002 (aged 22)	1	(Canada) Pacific Pride
Matthew Oworu	Back row	29 July 2000 (aged 24)	4	(Canada) Pacific Pride
Sion Parry	Back row	29 October 1998 (aged 25)	4	(Wales) Ebbw Vale
Lucas Rumball (c)	Back row	2 August 1995 (aged 29)	53	(United States) Chicago Hounds
Brock Gallagher	Scrum-half	13 July 1998 (aged 26)	2	(United States) Dallas Jackals
Jason Higgins	Scrum-half	28 March 1995 (aged 29)	15	(United States) Chicago Hounds
Jesse Kilgour	Scrum-half		0	(Canada) Pacific Pride
Mark Balaski	Fly-half		1	(Canada) Pacific Pride
Gradyn Bowd	Fly-half	August 27, 1992 (aged 31)	10	(United States) Old Glory DC
Peter Nelson	Fly-half	5 October 1992 (aged 31)	21	(Ireland) Dungannon
Ben LeSage	Centre	24 November 1995 (aged 28)	32	(United States) New England Free Jacks
Spencer Jones	Centre	July 17, 1997 (aged 27)	8	(United States) Utah Warriors
Takoda McMullin	Centre	1 May 2002 (aged 22)	2	(Canada) Vancouver Highlanders
Talon McMullin	Centre	1 May 2002 (aged 22)	2	(Canada) Vancouver Highlanders
Nic Benn	Wing	28 April 2001 (aged 23)	2	(United States) Dallas Jackals
Rhys James	Wing		0	(Canada) Pacific Pride
Kainoa Lloyd	Wing	21 May 1994 (aged 30)	24	(Canada) Toronto Saracens
Josiah Morra	Wing	7 February 1998 (aged 26)	3	(Canada) Toronto Saracens
Cooper Coats	Fullback	6 October 1996 (aged 27)	12	(Canada) Halifax Tars
Andrew Coe	Fullback	8 April 1996 (aged 28)	20	(United States) Los Angeles

=== Fiji ===
On 13 August 2024 the Fiji named a 30-player squad for their opening Pacific Nations Cup test against Samoa.

Ponepati Loganimasi and Meli Tuni were called up to the Fiji team and named in their twenty-three man squad on 19 September for their final match against Japan.

Player	Position	Date of birth (age)	Caps	Club/province
Mesu Dolokoto	Hooker	21 January 1995 (age 31)	13	(Fiji) Fijian Drua
Tevita Ikanivere (c)	Hooker	6 September 1999 (age 26)	15	(Fiji) Fijian Drua
Kavaia Tagivetaua	Hooker	5 June 2003 (aged 21)	0	(Fiji) Fijian Drua
Haereiti Hetet	Prop	10 July 1997 (aged 27)	7	(Fiji) Fijian Drua
Jone Koroiduadua	Prop	10 March 1999 (aged 25)	2	(Fiji) Fijian Drua
Eroni Mawi	Prop	2 June 1996 (aged 28)	33	(England) Saracens
Livai Natave	Prop	20 April 1999 (aged 25)	3	(Fiji) Fijian Drua
Peni Ravai	Prop	16 June 1990 (aged 34)	45	(Fiji) Fijian Drua
Samu Tawake	Prop	11 November 1996 (aged 27)	6	(Fiji) Fijian Drua
Meli Tuni	Prop	29 June 2000 (aged 24)	0	(Fiji) Fijian Drua
Meli Derenalagi	Lock	26 November 1998 (aged 25)	7	(Fiji) Fijian Drua
Temo Mayanavanua	Lock	9 November 1997 (aged 26)	17	(England) Northampton Saints
Isoa Nasilasila	Lock	13 September 1999 (aged 24)	14	(Fiji) Fijian Drua
Ratu Leone Rotuisolia	Lock	21 February 1998 (aged 26)	2	(Fiji) Fijian Drua
Mesake Vocevoce	Lock	16 May 2003 (aged 21)	0	(Fiji) Fijian Drua
Elia Canakaivata	Back row	12 July 1996 (aged 28)	2	(Fiji) Fijian Drua
Kitione Salawa Jr.	Back row	23 May 2001 (aged 23)	2	(Fiji) Fijian Drua
Albert Tuisue	Back row	6 June 1993 (aged 31)	26	(England) Gloucester
Frank Lomani	Scrum-half	18 April 1996 (aged 28)	33	(Fiji) Fijian Drua
Ratu Peni Matawalu	Scrum-half	8 July 1997 (aged 27)	7	(Fiji) Fijian Drua
Moses Sorovi	Scrum-half	15 January 1996 (aged 28)	0	(Fiji) Fijian Drua
Caleb Muntz	Fly-half	30 October 1999 (aged 24)	5	(Fiji) Fijian Drua
Isaiah Armstrong-Ravula	Fly-half	7 January 2004 (aged 20)	2	(Fiji) Fijian Drua
Iosefo Masi	Centre	9 May 1998 (aged 26)	4	(Fiji) Fijian Drua
Inia Tabuavou	Centre	31 August 2002 (aged 21)	2	(France) Racing 92
Apisalome Vota	Centre	6 October 1996 (aged 27)	0	(Fiji) Fijian Drua
Adrea Cocagi	Wing	1 March 1994 (aged 30)	1	(France) Castres
Vuate Karawalevu	Wing	5 March 2001 (aged 23)	0	(Australia) New South Wales Waratahs
Epeli Momo	Wing	22 October 1999 (aged 24)	0	(Fiji) Fijian Drua
Selestino Ravutaumada	Wing	17 January 2000 (aged 24)	7	(Fiji) Fijian Drua
Ilaisa Droasese	Fullback	13 September 1999 (aged 24)	9	(Fiji) Fijian Drua
Ponepati Loganimasi	Fullback	26 March 1998 (aged 26)	0	Fijian Drua / Fiji sevens

=== Japan ===
On 7 August 2024, Japan named a 35-player squad for the Pacific Nations Cup.

Amato Fakatava, not named in the teams initial squad, was named in the starting twenty-three for Japan's second pool fixture against the United States.

Taichi Takahashi and Yusuke Kajimura were called up to Japan's squad ahead of their Semi-final match against Samoa on 15 September.

Junta Hamano was named as a replacement in Japan's squad for their final match against Fiji on 21 September.

Player	Position	Date of birth (age)	Caps	Club/province
Mamoru Harada	Hooker	15 April 1999 (aged 25)	3	Toshiba Brave Lupus Tokyo
Kenta Matsuoka	Hooker	6 June 1997 (aged 27)	0	Kobelco Kobe Steelers
Atsushi Sakate	Hooker	21 June 1993 (aged 31)	44	Saitama Wild Knights
Yusuke Kizu	Prop	2 December 1995 (aged 28)	5	Toyota Verblitz
Shogo Miura	Prop	8 June 1995 (aged 29)	9	Toyota Verblitz
Takayoshi Mohara	Prop	17 March 2000 (aged 24)	3	Shizuoka Blue Revs
Takato Okabe	Prop	19 February 1995 (aged 29)	2	Yokohama Canon Eagles
Shuhei Takeuchi	Prop	9 December 1997 (aged 26)	6	Urayasu D-Rocks
Keijiro Tamefusa	Prop	3 September 2001 (aged 22)	3	Kubota Spears Funabashi Tokyo Bay
Warner Dearns	Lock	11 April 2002 (aged 22)	14	Toshiba Brave Lupus Tokyo
Amato Fakatava	Lock	7 December 1994 (aged 29)	8	Black Rams Tokyo
Eishin Kuwano	Lock	11 October 1994 (aged 29)	1	Shizuoka Blue Revs
Amanaki Saumaki	Lock	8 March 1997 (aged 27)	5	Kobelco Kobe Steelers
Epineri Uluviti	Lock	7 July 1996 (aged 28)	0	Mitsubishi Sagamihara DynaBoars
Sanaila Waqa	Lock	17 July 1995 (aged 29)	5	Hanazono Kintetsu Liners
Isaiah Collins-Mapusua	Back row	21 December 2000 (aged 23)	0	Toyota Verblitz
Tiennan Costley	Back row	14 June 2000 (aged 24)	2	Kobelco Kobe Steelers
Faulua Makisi	Back row	20 January 1997 (aged 27)	8	Kubota Spears Funabashi Tokyo Bay
Isaiah Mapusua	Back row	21 December 2000 (aged 23)	0	Toyota Verblitz
Kanji Shimokawa	Back row	17 January 1999 (aged 25)	6	Tokyo Sungoliath
Kai Yamamoto	Back row	17 March 2000 (aged 24)	1	Tokyo Sungoliath
Shinobu Fujiwara	Scrum-half	8 February 1999 (aged 25)	2	Kubota Spears Funabashi Tokyo Bay
Taiki Koyama	Scrum-half	31 October 1994 (aged 29)	2	Saitama Wild Knights
Yamato Murata	Scrum-half	15 October 2004 (aged 19)	0	Kyoto Sangyo University
Rikiya Matsuda	Fly-half	3 May 1994 (aged 30)	39	Toyota Verblitz
Lee Seung-sin	Fly-half	13 January 2001 (aged 23)	14	Kobelco Kobe Steelers
Junta Hamano	Centre	2 May 2001 (aged 23)	0	Kobelco Kobe Steelers
Yusuke Kajimura	Centre	13 September 1995 (aged 28)	0	Yokohama Canon Eagles
Nicholas McCurran	Centre	13 June 1996 (aged 28)	0	Toyota Verblitz
Tomoki Osada	Centre	25 November 1999 (aged 24)	10	Saitama Wild Knights
Harumichi Tatekawa (c)	Centre	2 December 1989 (aged 34)	56	Kubota Spears Funabashi Tokyo Bay
Samisoni Tua	Centre	24 May 1995 (aged 29)	3	Urayasu D-Rocks
Dylan Riley	Centre	2 May 1997 (aged 27)	20	Saitama Wild Knights
Kohaku Ebisawa	Wing	27 October 2004 (aged 19)	0	Meiji University
Jone Naikabula	Wing	12 April 1994 (aged 30)	11	Toshiba Brave Lupus Tokyo
Koga Nezuka	Wing	15 September 1998 (aged 25)	2	Kubota Spears Funabashi Tokyo Bay
Malo Tuitama	Wing	23 March 1996 (aged 28)	0	Shizuoka Blue Revs
Taichi Takahashi	Fullback	24 June 1996 (aged 28)	1	Toyota Verblitz
Takuya Yamasawa	Fullback	21 September 1994 (aged 29)	9	Saitama Wild Knights
Yoshitaka Yazaki	Fullback	12 May 2004 (aged 20)	3	Waseda University

=== Samoa ===
On 14 August, Samoa named a 31-player squad for the opening test of the Pacific Nations Cup against Fiji.

After initially not being named in the squad, players Lalomilo Lalomilo (centre), Brook Toomalatai (prop), Jonah Mau'u (flanker) and Danny Tusitala (scrum-half) were all named in the opening round of the tournament.

Samoa called-up Elisapeta Alofipo and Melani Nanai ahead of their Semi-final match against Japan on 15 September.

Player	Position	Date of birth (age)	Caps	Club/province
Sama Malolo	Hooker	19 February 1998 (aged 26)	9	(New Zealand) Moana Pasifika
Luteru Tolai	Hooker	1 June 1998 (aged 26)	3	(France) Biarritz
Andrew Tuala	Hooker	9 March 1991 (aged 33)	3	(Australia) Hunter Wildfires
Lolani Faleiva	Prop	22 December 1991 (aged 32)	2	(New Zealand) Taradale
Marco Fepulea'i	Prop	25 April 1995 (aged 29)	3	(France) Colomiers
Aki Seiuli	Prop	22 December 1992 (aged 31)	5	(Wales) Dragons
Brook Toomalatai	Prop		0	(New Zealand) New Brighton RC
Kalolo Tuiloma	Prop	24 June 1990 (aged 34)	4	(New Zealand) Taradale
Tietie Tuimauga	Prop	5 August 1993 (aged 31)	6	(France) US Montauban
Michael Curry	Lock	2 March 1994 (aged 30)	5	(New Zealand) Moana Pasifika
Theo McFarland (c)	Lock	16 October 1995 (aged 28)	14	(England) Saracens
Ben Nee-Nee	Lock	12 May 1993 (aged 31)	5	(Japan) Kamaishi Seawaves
Sam Slade	Lock	28 August 1997 (aged 26)	8	(New Zealand) Moana Pasifika
Senio Toleafoa	Lock	26 August 1993 (aged 30)	5	(France) Nevers
Iakopo Mapu	Back row	4 November 1997 (aged 26)	4	(New Zealand) Moana Pasifika
Izaiha Moore-Aiono	Back row	3 March 2000 (aged 24)	1	(England) Ampthill
Jonah Mau'u	Back row	28 July 1998 (aged 26)	0	(United States) New Orleans Gold
Olajuwon Noa	Back row	28 December 1989 (aged 34)	6	(United States) New Orleans Gold
Taleni Seu	Back row	26 December 1993 (aged 30)	9	(Japan) Toyota Industries Shuttles Aichi
Murphy Taramai	Back row	17 August 1992 (aged 32)	1	(Japan) Shimizu Koto Blue Sharks
Fred Tuilagi	Back row	9 June 1997 (aged 27)	0	(Samoa) Marist St. Joseph
Melani Matavao	Scrum-half	19 November 1995 (aged 28)	17	(New Zealand) Moana Pasifika
Jonathan Taumateine	Scrum-half	28 September 1996 (aged 27)	16	(New Zealand) Moana Pasifika
Danny Tusitala	Scrum-half	18 October 1991 (aged 32)	2	(United States) Old Glory DC
Rodney Iona	Fly-half	17 August 1991 (aged 33)	6	(United States) New Orleans Gold
D'Angelo Leuila	Fly-half	18 January 1997 (aged 27)	26	(New Zealand) Moana Pasifika
Afa Moleli	Fly-half		2	(New Zealand) University of Auckland
Stacey Ili	Centre	11 May 1991 (aged 33)	7	(New Zealand) Thames Valley
Alapati Leiua	Centre	21 September 1988 (aged 35)	32	(New Zealand) Ponsonby
Lalomilo Lalomilo	Centre	12 February 1999 (aged 25)	0	(New Zealand) Moana Pasifika
Elisapeta Alofipo	Wing	11 December 1997 (aged 26)	0	Samoa sevens
Tomasi Alosio	Wing	26 January 1992 (aged 32)	4	(United States) Anthem RC
Pisi Leilua	Wing	12 May 1995 (aged 29)	1	(New Zealand) Waipu
Owen Niue	Wing		1	(Samoa) Afega
Tuna Tuitama	Wing	25 February 2000 (aged 24)	0	(New Zealand) Moana Pasifika
Melani Nanai	Fullback	3 August 1993 (aged 31)	0	(Canada) Vancouver Highlanders
Danny Toala	Fullback	26 March 1999 (aged 25)	14	(New Zealand) Moana Pasifika

=== Tonga ===
On 17 August 2024, Tonga named a 30-player squad for the Pacific Nations Cup.

Players Penisoni Fineanganofo, Tupou Ma'afu Afungia, and Sosefo Sakalia were named in the squad for Tonga's second round fixture against Samoa.

Salesi Tuifua was selected for Tonga's second fixture in Pool A against Fiji.

Kafaikamoana Vaea, Vutulongo Puloka and Josiah Unga were all called up for Tonga ahead of their Fifth-place play-off match against Canada on 14 September.

Player	Position	Date of birth (age)	Caps	Club/province
Solomone Aniseko	Hooker	8 March 1997 (aged 27)	1	(England) Marlborough RFC
Penisoni Fineanganofo	Hooker	20 March 1998 (aged 26)	0	New Zealand sevens
William Fonohema	Hooker		0	(New Zealand) Hawke's Bay
Sekope Lopeti-Moli	Hooker	12 August 1996 (aged 28)	1	(New Zealand) Moutere RFC
Sosefo Sakalia	Hooker	14 December 1991 (aged 32)	13	
Jethro Felemi	Prop	1 January 1994 (aged 30)	10	(New Zealand) North Shore
Tau Koloamatangi	Prop	3 January 1995 (aged 29)	12	(New Zealand) Moana Pasifika
Duke Nginingini	Prop		4	(New Zealand) North Harbour
Ben Tameifuna (c)	Prop	30 August 1991 (aged 32)	35	(France) Bordeaux Bègles
Salesi Tuifua	Prop		0	(New Zealand) Moana Pasifika / Counties Manukau
Brandon Televave	Prop		1	(Tonga) Houmale'eia
Tevita Ahokovi	Lock		0	(New Zealand) Auckland Marist
Kelemete Finau-Fetuli	Lock		3	(New Zealand) Papatoetoe
Paea Fonoifua	Lock	8 March 1993 (aged 31)	0	(New Zealand) North Harbour
Harison Mataele	Lock	1 January 1994 (aged 30)	5	(Australia) Eastern Suburbs
Vutulongo Puloka	Lock		1	
Lotu Inisi	Back row	26 April 1999 (aged 25)	4	(New Zealand) Moana Pasifika
Josh Kaifa	Back row	21 July 1992 (aged 32)	2	(New Zealand) Hawke's Bay
Tupou Ma'afu Afungia	Back row	12 September 1999 (aged 24)	0	(United States) San Diego Legion
Hapakuki Moala-Liava'a	Back row	9 November 1996 (aged 27)	1	(New Zealand) Manurewa
Sione Takai	Back row		1	(New Zealand) Pakuranga United
Aisea Halo	Scrum-half	29 June 1993 (aged 31)	7	(New Zealand) Moana Pasifika
Siaosi Nai	Scrum-half	19 September 1999 (aged 24)	0	(United States) Anthem Rugby Carolina
Manu Paea	Scrum-half	17 September 2001 (aged 22)	12	(New Zealand) Moana Pasifika
Patrick Pellegrini	Fly-half	28 September 1998 (aged 25)	4	(New Zealand) Moana Pasifika
Tyler Pulini	Fly-half		1	(New Zealand) Kumeu
Semisi Ma'asi	Fly-half	18 January 2001 (aged 23)	1	(New Zealand) Hihifo Rugby
Nikolai Foliaki	Centre	25 December 1997 (aged 26)	5	(Australia) Western Force
Fine Inisi	Centre	19 May 1998 (aged 26)	10	(New Zealand) Moana Pasifika
Fetuli Paea	Centre	16 August 1994 (aged 30)	7	(Italy) Zebre Parma
Latu Akauola	Wing		0	(Tonga) Ha`Atafu
Esau Filimoehala	Wing		0	(New Zealand) Karaka
John Tapueluelu	Wing	7 April 1999 (aged 25)	1	(New Zealand) Kumeu
Sam Tuitupou	Fullback		0	Tonga sevens
Josiah Unga	Fullback		0	(New Zealand) Marist Brothers Old Boys
Kafaikamoana Vaea	Fullback		0	

=== United States ===
On 15 August 2024, the United States announced a 31-player squad for the Pacific Nations Cup.

Payton Telea-Ilalio was named in the United States' replacements for their squad in their final match against Samoa.

Player	Position	Date of birth (age)	Caps	Club/province
Cyrille Cama	Hooker	April 23, 2001 (aged 23)	0	(United States) San Diego Legion
Sean McNulty	Hooker	July 10, 1995 (aged 29)	0	(United States) Miami Sharks
Kapeli Pifeleti	Hooker	1 September 1999 (aged 24)	12	(England) Saracens
Pono Davis	Prop	August 4, 1997 (aged 27)	0	(United States) Houston SaberCats
Jack Iscaro	Prop	4 August 1997 (aged 27)	7	(United States) Old Glory DC
Alex Maughan	Prop	24 April 1995 (aged 29)	3	(United States) RFC Los Angeles
Paul Mullen	Prop	16 November 1991 (aged 32)	35	(United States) Utah Warriors
Payton Telea-Ilalio	Prop	17 August 1998 (aged 26)	0	(United States) San Diego Legion
Jake Turnbull	Prop	17 July 1993 (aged 31)	7	(United States) Anthem RC
Jason Damm	Lock	26 January 1995 (aged 29)	2	(United States) RFC Los Angeles
Greg Peterson (c)	Lock	31 August 1989 (aged 34)	44	(United States) San Diego Legion
William Waguespack	Lock	March 3, 1998 (aged 26)	0	(United States) New Orleans Gold
Cory Daniel	Back row	September 11, 1995 (aged 28)	3	(United States) Old Glory DC
Jamason Faʻanana-Schultz	Back row	13 June 1996 (aged 28)	11	(United States) Old Glory DC
Vili Helu	Back row	20 March 1996 (aged 28)	7	(United States) San Diego Legion
Paddy Ryan	Back row	13 October 1998 (aged 25)	7	(United States) San Diego Legion
Moni Tongaʻuiha	Back row	October 5, 1994 (aged 29)	6	(United States) New Orleans Gold
Thomas Tu’avao	Back row	27 October 1993 (aged 30)	6	(United States) Utah Warriors
Ruben de Haas	Scrum-half	9 October 1998 (aged 25)	31	(South Africa) Cheetahs
Ethan McVeigh	Scrum-half	14 December 1999 (aged 24)	1	(United States) Old Glory DC
Juan-Philip Smith	Scrum-half	30 March 1994 (aged 30)	2	(United States) Seattle Seawolves
Luke Carty	Fly-half	27 September 1997 (aged 26)	16	(United States) Chicago Hounds
Rand Santos	Fly-half		0	(United States) University of California
Dominic Besag	Centre	August 6, 2004 (aged 20)	2	(United States) Saint Mary's College
Tommaso Boni	Centre	15 January 1993 (aged 31)	6	(United States) Old Glory DC
Bryce Campbell	Centre	21 September 1994 (aged 29)	46	(United States) Chicago Hounds
Tavite Lopeti	Centre	20 November 1998 (aged 25)	14	(United States) Seattle Seawolves
Nate Augspurger	Wing	31 January 1990 (aged 34)	43	(United States) Chicago Hounds
Conner Mooneyham	Wing	26 March 1996 (aged 28)	1	(United States) Seattle Seawolves
Mitch Wilson	Wing	15 April 1996 (aged 28)	8	(United States) New England Free Jacks
Toby Fricker	Fullback	July 20, 1995 (aged 29)	0	(United States) New England Free Jacks
Chris Mattina	Fullback	March 31, 1993 (aged 31)	5	(United States) San Diego Legion
