= Malo Tuitama =

Rugby union player (born 1996)

Malo Tuitama マロ・ツイタマ
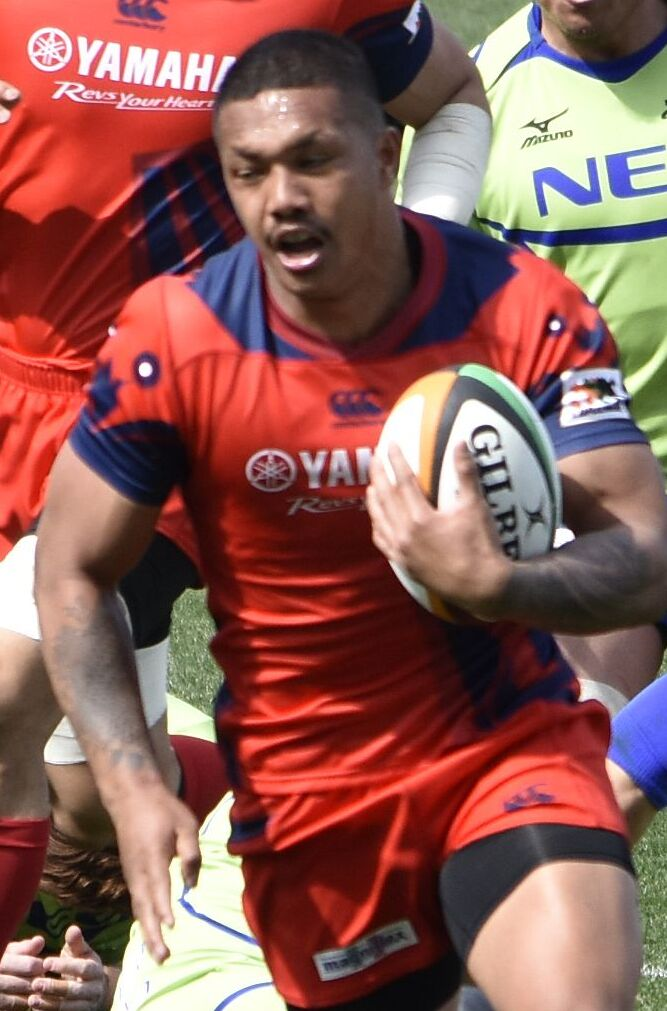
- Tuitama with the Blue Revs in 2021
- Born: 23 March 1996 (age 30) Malie, Upolu, Western Samoa
- Height: 182 cm (6 ft 0 in)
- Weight: 91 kg (201 lb; 14 st 5 lb)
- School: Tangaroa College; Porirua College; Scots College, Wellington
- Notable relatives: Alapati Leiua (uncle); Ofisa Treviranus (uncle)

Rugby union career
- Position(s): Wing, Centre, Fullback
- Current team: Shizuoka Blue Revs
Youth career
- 2014: Hurricanes U18s
Senior career
Years	Team	Apps	(Points)
2015–2018	Wellington	24	(65)
2019–	Shizuoka Blue Revs	79	(390)
- Correct as of 17 May 2025
International career
Years	Team	Apps	(Points)
2016	New Zealand U20	5	(15)
2024–	Japan	9	(15)
- Correct as of 30 August 2025

Malo Tuitama (Japanese: マロ・ツイタマ; born 23 March 1996) is a professional rugby union player currently playing with the Shizuoka Blue Revs in the Japan Rugby League One (JRLO) and the Japan national team. His main playing position is left wing, however he has been deployed as a centre and a fullback. Born in Samoa, Tuitama represents Japan at senior international level and represented New Zealand at youth international level.

== Early life and background ==
Tuitama was born in the village of Malie on the island of Upolu in Western Samoa in 1996. His uncles, Alapati Leiua, and Ofisa Treviranus were also born there. Tuitama and his family moved to New Zealand in 2003, initially to Wellington but then to Auckland, before returning to Wellington in 2012. He was educated at Tangaroa College in Auckland, and spent a year at Porirua College before transferring to Scots College, Wellington in 2013. While at Scots College, Tuitama was selected in the Hurricanes U18s. Speaking to Stuff, Wellington Rugby's rugby development co-ordinator Dave King said of Tuitama: "He's a very promising young man and certainly has the potential for a professional career [in rugby]."

In 2016 Tuitama was selected in the New Zealand U20 team ahead of the 2016 World Rugby Under 20 Championship in England.

== Rugby career ==
=== Wellington ===
Between 2016 and 2018, Tuitama represented the Wellington Lions in the National Provincial Championship (NPC). He made four appearances during his debut season in the 2016 Mitre 10 Cup. In 2017, he contributed significantly to Wellington's championship-winning campaign, featuring in ten matches, scoring five tries, and regularly coming off the bench in the latter stages of the season. His performances helped secure the team's promotion to the Premiership division for 2018.

While Wellington faced tougher competition following promotion, Tuitama's involvement increased notably in 2018. He played in ten matches, nine of them as a starter, and improved his try count to six. Over the course of his three seasons with Wellington, Tuitama made 24 appearances and scored a total of 13 tries.

=== Shizuoka Blue Revs ===
In April 2019, Tuitama was named as one of three new signings for the Yamaha Júbilo (now known as the Shizuoka Blue Revs) in the Japanese Top League. He played in all six of the teams opening fixtures for the 2020 Top League season before it was cancelled due to the COVID-19 pandemic, scoring eleven tries in the process; equating a try ratio of 1.83 per game.

Tuitama played six of Yamaha's eight games during the 2021 Top League season (which was shortened and re-configured due to the COVID-19 pandemic). He started in every match he played at left wing, and scored nine tries in total, including a hat-trick against the Hino Red Dolphins in Round 1. Yamaha lost to the Kubota Spears in the Round of 16.

Between 2022 and 2023, Tuitama appeared in 20 matches for the Shizuoka Blue Revs, establishing himself as a regular starter in the latter season, during which he recorded nine tries. He finished the period with 15 tries in total and was occasionally deployed at outside centre, a departure from his usual position. During these two seasons, the Blue Revs struggled for form, finishing eighth consecutively and narrowly avoiding the relegation play-offs.

The 2023–24 season marked the most prolific period of Tuitama's career to date. He led the competition in tries, recording multiple tries in five matches, including a hat-trick against the Sagamihara DynaBoars in a high-scoring encounter ultimately lost 53–45. Scoring as many tries as appearances, Tuitama earned a reputation as a fan favourite and drew the attention of incoming national coach Eddie Jones, who successfully brought the 28-year-old into the Japan setup. Despite his strong individual performance, the Blue Revs finished eighth for the third consecutive year — once again narrowly avoiding the relegation play-offs.

In the 2024–25 season, Tuitama featured in all but one match for a markedly improved Shizuoka Blue Revs side. He scored 11 tries, including back-to-back hat-tricks in Rounds 2 and 3, maintaining his reputation as a consistent attacking threat. The Blue Revs finished fourth in the regular season standings, securing a place in the playoffs, but were eliminated in the quarter-finals following a 20–35 defeat to the Kobe Steelers.

== International career ==
Eligible to represent Japan, New Zealand, and his native Samoa, Malo Tuitama committed to the Brave Blossoms following a standout 2023–24 season with the Shizuoka Blue Revs. He made his international debut on 25 August 2024 against Canada at BC Place in Vancouver in the 2024 Pacific Nations Cup (PNC). Tuitama started on the left wing and scored the first try of the match in the fourth minute. Japan won 28–55. Tuitama went on to play in all of Japan's matches in the PNC, scoring three tries overall.

Months later, in the 2024 Autumn Internationals, Tuitama started in Japan's matches against New Zealand, France, and Uruguay; being moved to fullback for the latter two.

In August 2025, Tuitama was called up to Japan's squad for the 2025 Pacific Nations Cup.
