= Tomoki Osada =

Japan international rugby union player

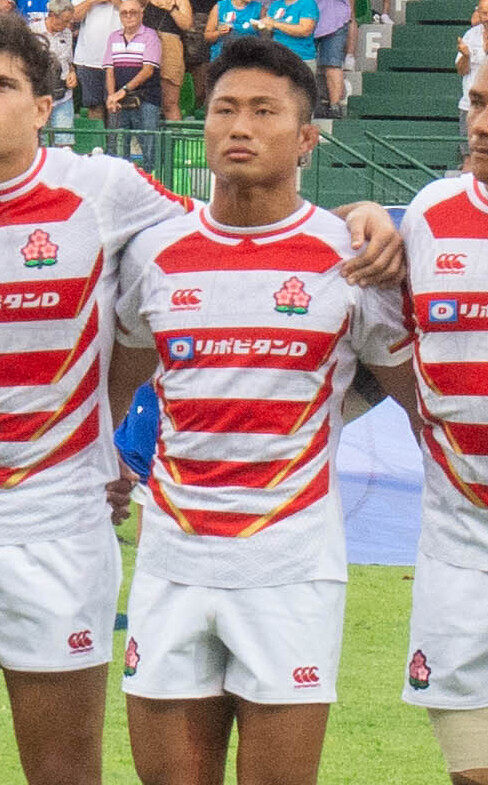
- Osada with Japan in 2023
- Full name: Tomoki Osada
- Born: 25 November 1999 (age 26) Kyoto, Japan
- Height: 1.79 m (5 ft 10 in)
- Weight: 90 kg (14 st 2 lb; 200 lb)
- University: Waseda University

Rugby union career
- Position(s): Centre, Wing
- Current team: Saitama Wild Knights
Senior career
| Years | Team | Apps | (Points) |
| 2022– | Saitama Wild Knights | 65 | (145) |
International career
| Years | Team | Apps | (Points) |
| 2019 | Japan U20 | | |
| 2023– | Japan | 28 | (20) |
| 2024 | Japan XV | 3 | (0) |
- Correct as of 22 November 2025

Tomoki Osada (長田智希, Osada Tomoki; born 25 November 1999) is a Japanese rugby union player who plays as a centre for Japan and Saitama Wild Knights in the Japan Rugby League One.

== Biography ==
Tomoki was born in Kyoto Prefecture. He captained Tōkai University Gyōsei High School to a national championship and secured a berth in an all-Japan schoolboy 15. He later stamped his authority playing for Waseda University, where, as a fresher, he positioned himself as a regular starter.

== Career ==
He was an integral member of the Saitama Wild Knights squad, which emerged as runners-up in the 2022–23 Japan Rugby League One – Division 1 after losing the final against Kubota Spears Funabashi Tokyo Bay, in a closely fought contest as it went down the wire with the final scoreline of 15 - 17, being tilted in favor of Kubota Spears Funabashi Tokyo Bay. He was adjudged as the rookie of the year for his notable performance in the 2022/23 Japan Rugby League One season and was also subsequently named in the league’s team of the year for the 2022/23 season.

Osada was named in Japanese squad for the 2023 World Rugby Pacific Nations Cup, a tournament which was organised for the preparation of the Pacific nations ahead of the 2023 Rugby World Cup. He made his international debut against Samoa on 22 July 2023 at the 2023 World Rugby Pacific Nations Cup.

He was also included in Japanese squad for the 2023 Rugby World Cup and his first World Cup match came against England in a Pool D clash which was played at Allianz Riviera. In August 2024, he was named in the 34-member Japanese squad for the 2024 World Rugby Pacific Nations Cup. Japan eventually emerged as runners-up to Fiji after losing by 41–17 in the Grand Final.

He was also a member of the Saitama Wild Knights squad which emerged as runners-up in the 2023–24 Japan Rugby League One – Division 1 against Toshiba Brave Lupus Tokyo.
