= Tuna Tuitama =

Samoa international rugby union player

- Born: 25 February 2000 (age 26) Samoa
- Height: 188 cm (6 ft 2 in)
- Weight: 82 kg (181 lb; 12 st 13 lb)
- School: Leulumoega Fou College

Rugby union career
- Position: Wing
Senior career
Years	Team	Apps	(Points)
2025–2026	Moana Pasifika	0	(0)
- Correct as of 10 December 2024
International career
Years	Team	Apps	(Points)
2024–	Samoa	4	(15)
- Correct as of 10 December 2024
National sevens team
Years	Team		Comps
2020–	Samoa Sevens		15
- Correct as of 10 December 2024

Tuna Tuitama (born 25 February 2000) is a Samoan rugby union player, who played for Moana Pasifika. His preferred position is wing.

== Early career ==
Tuitama was born in Samoa and grew up on the island in the villages of Mulifanua and Faleasiu. He attended Leulumoega Fou College where he began playing rugby.

== Professional career ==
Tuitama began his professional career representing the Samoa Sevens team in 2020 having played club rugby for Aana Chiefs. In 2024 he earned selection for the Samoa nation 15-aside team, making his debut in the 2024 World Rugby Pacific Nations Cup against Fiji, going on to make another 3 appearances in the tournament. He was then named in the Moana Pasifika squad for the 2025 Super Rugby Pacific season in November 2024.
