= 2020 MLR Draft =

First annual North American rugby union draft

General information
- Date: June 12, 2020

Overview
- 24 total selections in 2 rounds
- League: Major League Rugby
- First selection: Conner Mooneyham, Wing/Center, Dallas Jackals
- Most selections (4): Dallas Jackals and Utah Warriors
- Fewest selections (2): ATL, Austin, LA, New England, New Orleans, DC, San Diego, Seattle

The 2020 MLR Collegiate Draft was the first of its kind for rugby union in North America. On April 8, 2020, the MLR announced that on June 13, 2020, they will host their first collegiate MLR Draft. All of the participating teams for the 2021 season, except the Toronto Arrows, participated in the draft.

== Format ==
Major League Rugby first ever Collegiate Draft was held on June 13, 2020.

The Draft consisted of four rounds and the order of selection was determined by the inverse order of standings from the abbreviated 2020 Season from COVID-19, with expansion teams placed at the head of it. Once selected, teams used a "draft-and-follow" approach and had until one MLR season after the player's collegiate eligibility ended, to reach an agreement with the athlete.

Players must have played U.S. collegiate rugby in the one year preceding the draft (between June 13, 2019 to June 12, 2020); AND Must have completed three years of college OR be at least 21 years of age. These criteria allow for athletes who have completed their Junior year to declare for the Draft while continuing to play in Collegiate competition as long as they remain eligible.

=== Hosts ===
MLR analyst Dan Power and MLR reporter Dani Wexelman were hosts of the Draft, and were joined by Stacy Paetz, sideline reporter for MLR games and host of MLR All-Access.

== Player selections ==
Rd	Pick #	MLR team	Player	Pos.	College	Division	Conference	Notes
1	1	Dallas Jackals	Conner Mooneyham	Wing/Center	Life	D1-A	Mid-South	2019 Collegiate All-American (2nd team)
1	2	New Orleans Gold	Brian Nault	Prop	Central Washington	D1-A	Independent	from LA
1	3	Utah Warriors	Derek Ellingson	Center/Wing	Saint Mary's	D1-A	California	from Houston
1	4	Austin Gilgronis	Lui Sitama	Center/Utility Back	American International	D1-A	Liberty	
1	5	Seattle Seawolves	Aaron Matthews	Center	Saint Mary's	D1-A	California	2018 Collegiate All-American (2nd team); 2019 Collegiate All-American (2nd team); 2019 Rudy Scholz Award Finalist; 2020 Rudy Scholz Award Nominee
1	6	New England Free Jacks	Justin Johnson	Openside Flanker	Life	D1-A	Mid-South	2019 Collegiate All-American (2nd team)
1	7	Utah Warriors	John Powers	Wing/Fullback	Iona	D1-A	Liberty	
1	8	Rugby ATL	Michael Matarazzo	Number 8/Lock	Notre Dame	D1-A	Independent	2018 Collegiate All-American (3rd team)
1	9	Dallas Jackals	Tommy Clark	Flanker/Lock	American International	D1-A	Liberty	from New York; 2018 Collegiate All-American (2nd team); 2019 Collegiate All-American (3rd team); 2020 Rudy Scholz Award Finalist
1	10	New Orleans Gold	Andrew Guerra	Flanker	Notre Dame College	D1-A	Rugby East	
1	11	Old Glory DC	Casey Renaud	Lock	Kutztown	D1-A	Rugby East	
1	12	San Diego Legion	Patrick Madden	Fly-Half/Center	Cal Poly	D1-A	California	2020 Rudy Scholz Award Finalist
2	13	Dallas Jackals	Levi Van Lanen	Center	Wisconsin–Whitewater	D2		2016 D2 Collegiate All-American 7s (1st team); 2017 D2 Collegiate All-American 7s (1st team); 2018 D2 Collegiate All-American 7s (1st team); 2019 D2 Collegiate All-American 7s (1st team)
2	14	LA Giltinis	Watson Filikitonga	Center	Iona	D1-A	Liberty	
2	15	Utah Warriors	Danny Giannascoli	Fly-Half/Fullback	Loyola Maryland	NSCRO	Mid-Atlantic	from Houston; 2019 NSCRO All-American; 2020 NSCRO All-American
2	16	Austin Gilgronis	Mason Koch	Hooker	Dartmouth	D1-AA	Ivy League	
2	17	Seattle Seawolves	Nicholas Taylor	Center/Fly-Half	Lindenwood	D1-A	Mid-South	
2	18	New England Free Jacks	Spencer Krueger	Prop	Ohio State	D1-A	Big 10	2018 Collegiate All-American (3rd team)
2	19	Utah Warriors	Elijiah Hayes	Prop	Iowa Central			
2	20	Rugby ATL	John Scotti	Wing/Center	Arkansas State	D1-A	Mid-South	
2	21	Dallas Jackals	Bronson Teles	Number 8/Lock	Arizona	D1-A	PAC	from New York; 2019 Collegiate All-American (2nd team); 2020 Rudy Scholz Award Nominee
2	22	LA Giltinis	Stephan McLeish	Hooker/Flanker	Lindenwood	D1-A	Mid-South	2020 Rudy Scholz Award Nominee
2	23	Old Glory DC	Matthew Gordan	Lock/Number 8	Mary Washington	D1-A	Rugby East	2019 Collegiate All-American (1st team)
2	24	San Diego Legion	Cole Zarcone	Wing	Central Washington	D1-A	Independent	2019 Collegiate All-American 7s (1st team); 2020 Rudy Scholz Award Nominee
