= Aroha Lam =

New Zealand rugby union player

- Born: 3 June 1978 (age 48)

Rugby union career
- Position: Halfback
Amateur team(s)
Years	Team	Apps	(Points)
	Auckland Marist		(0)
Provincial / State sides
Years	Team	Apps	(Points)
1999–2002	Counties Manukau	14	(20)
2003–?	Auckland		(0)
International career
Years	Team	Apps	(Points)
2004	New Zealand	3	(0)

Aroha Lam (née Moore; born 3 June 1978) is a former New Zealand rugby union player.

== Rugby career ==
Lam made three appearances for the Black Ferns when she was selected for the squad for the 2004 Churchill Cup tournament in Canada.

She made her international debut on 8 June 2004 in a warm-up match against Canada in Vancouver. Her second test against the Eagles saw her side score 35 unanswered points. In her final appearance, her side hammered England 38–0 to win the inaugural tournament in Edmonton.

== Personal life ==
Lam's son, Izaiha Moore-Aiono, played for England's under-20 side in 2019.
