= Tupou Afungia =

Tonga international rugby union player

- Full name: Tupou Ma'afu-Afungia
- Born: 12 September 1999 (age 27) Tonga
- Height: 187 cm (6 ft 2 in)
- Weight: 105 kg (231 lb; 16 st 7 lb)
- School: Westlake Boys High School

Rugby union career
- Position: Flanker
Senior career
Years	Team	Apps	(Points)
2022	Hawke's Bay	1	(15)
2023–2024	San Diego Legion	24	(27)
2025	New Orleans Gold	11	(0)
2026	Moana Pasifika	1	(0)
- Correct as of 7 March 2026
International career
Years	Team	Apps	(Points)
2019	Tonga U20		
2024–	Tonga	9	(5)
- Correct as of 9 November 2025

Tupou Afungia (born 12 September 1999) is a Tongan rugby union player, who played for Moana Pasifika. His preferred position is flanker.

== Early career ==
Afungia is from Tonga and represented their national side at both under-16 and under-20 level. He moved to New Zealand for schooling and attended Westlake Boys High School where he played rugby. Following schooling he moved to the Hawke's Bay region to become part of their academy, while also playing club rugby for the Māori Agricultural College Old Boys.

== Professional career ==
Afungia signed his first professional contract for the San Diego Legion, signing for the 2023 Major League Rugby season. He re-signed for the 2024 season making 24 appearances in total for the side. Ahead of the 2025 Major League Rugby season, he transferred to New Orleans Gold where he was re-united with former coach Danny Lee. He signed for Moana Pasifika ahead of the 2026 Super Rugby Pacific season.

Afungia made his international debut for Tonga in the 2024 World Rugby Pacific Nations Cup debuting against Samoa.
