= Izaiha Moore-Aiono =

Samoan rugby union player

- Born: Izaiha Moore-Aiono; 3 March 2000 (age 26) Auckland, New Zealand
- Height: 1.83 m (6 ft 0 in)
- Weight: 99 kg (15 st 8 lb)
- School: Wellington College, Berkshire

Rugby union career
- Position(s): Flanker, Number 8
- Current team: Castres
Amateur team(s)
Years	Team	Apps	(Points)
–	Bracknell RFC	–	(–)
–	Esher RFC	–	(–)
Senior career
Years	Team	Apps	(Points)
2020–23	London Irish	9	(0)
2022–23	→ Ealing Trailfinders	–	(–)
2023	Northampton Saints	4	(0)
2023–24	Ampthill	21	(10)
2024	Saracens	3	(10)
2025–	Castres	1	(0)
- Correct as of 29 January 2025
International career
Years	Team	Apps	(Points)
2018	England U19s	1	(0)
2019	England U20s	1	(5)
2024–	Samoa	4	(15)
- Correct as of 29 January 2025

Izaiha Moore-Aiono (born 3 March 2000) is a professional rugby union player, who currently plays as a back row forward for Castres in the French Top 14. Born in New Zealand, he represents Samoa at international level after qualifying on ancestry grounds.

== Early life ==
Moore-Aiono was born in Auckland, New Zealand to Māori and Samoan parents. His mother, Aroha Lam (née Moore), played rugby at test level for the Black Ferns, earning three caps in 2004. His father, Rudal Aiono, is of a Samoan family originating from Fasito'o Uta in Upolu and Sataua in Savai'i.

When he was six years old, Moore-Aiono moved with his family to Queensland in Australia, where he began playing rugby league in the junior section of NRL side North Queensland Cowboys. At the age of 13, he emigrated to England, settling in Berkshire. While a student at Wellington College, Moore-Aiono switched to rugby union, representing both Bracknell and the Berkshire county team, before he was recruited into the London Irish junior academy in 2015. During his time in the club's senior academy, he spent the 2018–19 season dual-registered the National League 1 side Esher.

== Club career ==
Moore-Aiono made his senior debut for London Irish during the 2019–20 season, coming on as a replacement in a Premiership match against Harlequins in September 2020. His first league start followed in the 2020–21 season, against Sale Sharks in December 2020. Playing as a flanker or number 8, the majority of Moore-Aiono's appearances for London Irish took place in the Premiership Rugby Cup, whilst he also had a spell on loan with the RFU Championship club Ealing Trailfinders.

In June 2023, Moore-Aiono was made redundant and left without a club, after London Irish was suspended from all rugby competitions, upon entering into administration due to financial insolvency. Subsequently, he was signed by Northampton Saints on a short-term contract in August, featuring as a guest player in the 2023–24 Premiership Rugby Cup, and in a friendly fixture against the Barbarians. Once this deal ended, Moore-Aiono transferred to Ampthill in October, for the remainder of the 2023–24 RFU Championship. He featured 18 times for the team across their league and cup campaign, scoring two tries.

The following season, Moore-Aiono joined Saracens on a trial basis, ahead of the start of the 2024–25 Premiership Rugby Cup, and scored two tries in as many appearances to begin his time at the club. At the end of this trial period, he was recruited by Castres in France, on a short-term 'medical joker' deal, to cover for injuries in the Top 14 club's senior squad.

== International career ==
Moore-Aiono was eligible to represent four different nations under World Rugby criteria. He qualified for New Zealand and Samoa via ancestry, and also England and Australia on residency grounds.

At age-grade level, Moore-Aiono represented England, with his first start for the England U19s occurring in a win over Wales in April 2019. This was followed a month later with a try-scoring debut for the England U20s, in a victory against South Africa.

Having opted to represent his ancestral home country of Samoa at test level, Moore-Aiono received his first senior call-up for the 2024 summer internationals. He made his test debut for Samoa on 5 July 2024, starting at openside flanker and scoring a try in the nation's 33–25 triumph over Italy. He earned three further caps during Samoa's bronze medal-winning campaign in the 2024 Pacific Nations Cup, which included a brace of tries against Tonga.
