= Shogo Miura =

Japan international rugby union player

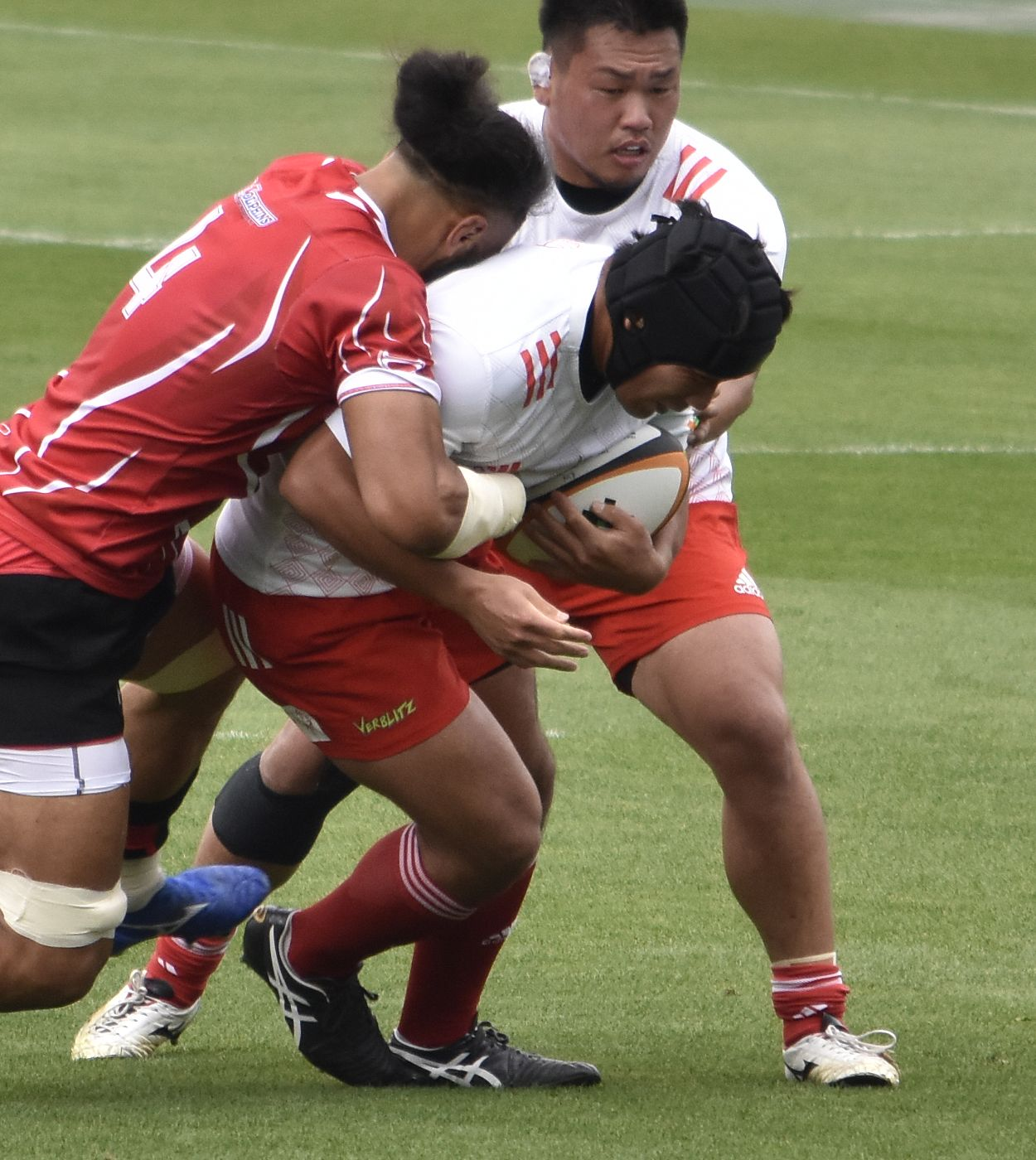
- Full name: Shogo Miura
- Born: 7 June 1995 (age 31) Akita City, Japan
- Height: 1.80 m (5 ft 11 in)
- Weight: 113 kg (17 st 11 lb; 249 lb)

Rugby union career
- Position: Prop
- Current team: Toyota Verblitz
Senior career
Years	Team	Apps	(Points)
2018–present	Toyota Verblitz	110	(15)
2019	Sunwolves	1	(0)
- Correct as of 21 February 2021
International career
Years	Team	Apps	(Points)
2014–2015	Japan U20	14	(0)
2016–	Japan	7	(0)
- Correct as of 21 February 2021

Shogo Miura (三浦昌悟, Miura Shōgo; born 7 June 1995) is a Japanese rugby union player who plays as a prop. He currently plays for Sunwolves in Super Rugby and Toyota Verblitz in Japan's domestic Top League.
