= Conor Young =

Canadian rugby union player

- Born: 15 August 1995 (age 31) Yamba, New South Wales, Australia
- Height: 185 cm (6 ft 1 in)
- Weight: 114 kg (251 lb; 17 st 13 lb)

Rugby union career
- Position: Prop
- Current team: New England Free Jacks
Senior career
Years	Team	Apps	(Points)
2017	Greater Sydney Rams		
2023–	New England Free Jacks		
- Correct as of 20 March 2023
International career
Years	Team	Apps	(Points)
2015	Canada U20		
2022–	Canada	1	(0)
- Correct as of 20 March 2023

Conor Young (born 15 August 1995) is an Australian-born Canadian rugby union player, currently playing for the New England Free Jacks. His preferred position is prop.

== Early career ==
Young is from Yamba, New South Wales and has represented the Southern Districts since 2014. Between 2019 and 2022, he represented Southern Knights in Scotland's Super 6 competition.

== Professional career ==
Young's first spell as a professional was for Greater Sydney Rams in the 2017 National Rugby Championship. He signed for the New England Free Jacks ahead of the 2023 Major League Rugby season.

Young is Canadian qualified, and represented Canada U20 in 2015. He made his debut for the full Canada side against Netherlands in late 2022.
