= Taichi Takahashi =

Japanese rugby union player

Taichi Takahashi 高橋汰地
- Born: 24 June 1996 (age 30) Hyōgo Prefecture, Japan
- Height: 180 cm (5 ft 11 in)
- Weight: 91 kg (201 lb; 14 st 5 lb)
- School: Josho Gauken High School
- University: Meiji University

Rugby union career
- Position(s): Wing, Fullback
- Current team: Toyota Verblitz
Senior career
Years	Team	Apps	(Points)
2019–	Toyota Verblitz	81	(265)
- Correct as of 13 April 2025
International career
Years	Team	Apps	(Points)
2022–	Japan	2	(5)
- Correct as of 13 April 2025

Taichi Takahashi (born 24 June 1996) is a Japanese rugby union player, who plays for Toyota Verblitz. His preferred position is wing.

== Early career ==
Takahashi attended Josho Gakuen High School before attending Meiji University.

== Professional career ==
After leaving university, Takahashi joined Toyota Verblitz in 2019, and made his official debut for the side in Round 1 of the 2020 Top League against Yamaha Júbilo. His performances for Toyota Verblitz earned him selection for the Japan national side for their European tour in 2021, although he did not play on the tour. He would though make his debut for Japan in July 2022, coming on as a replacement against France. He has gone on to win a further two caps, scoring a try against Samoa.

In 2023, Takahashi represented the Barbarians.
