= Dylan Riley (rugby union) =

South African-born Japanese international rugby union player (born 1997)

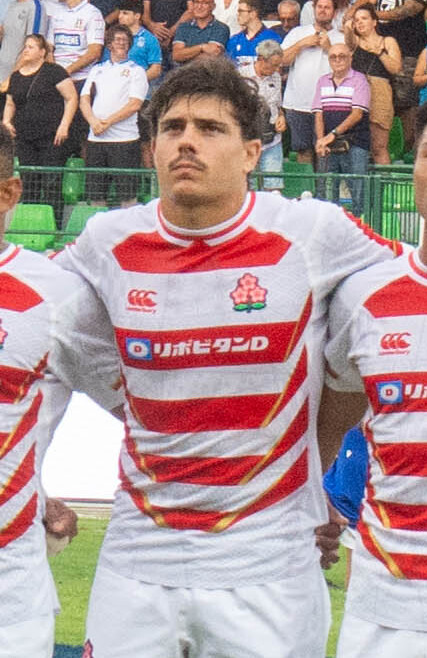
- Riley with Japan in 2023
- Born: 2 May 1997 (age 29) Durban, KwaZulu-Natal, South Africa
- Height: 1.87 m (6 ft 2 in)
- Weight: 102 kg (225 lb; 16 st 1 lb)
- School: The Southport School

Rugby union career
- Position(s): Centre, Wing
- Current team: Panasonic Wild Knights
Senior career
Years	Team	Apps	(Points)
2017	Brisbane City	5	(10)
2018–	Panasonic Wild Knights	92	(240)
- Correct as of 17 February 2025
International career
Years	Team	Apps	(Points)
2017	Australia U20	2	(5)
2021–	Japan	48	(65)
2023	Japan XV	2	(0)
- Correct as of 20 November 2024
Medal record
Boy's rugby sevens
Representing Australia
Commonwealth Youth Games
Silver medal – second place	2015 Apia	Team competition
Men's rugby union
Oceania U20 Championship
Runner-up	2017 Gold Coast	Team competition

Dylan Riley (ディラン・ライリー, Diran Rairī; born 2 May 1997) is a professional rugby union player who plays as a centre for Japan Rugby League One club Saitama Wild Knights. Born in South Africa, he represents Japan at international level after qualifying on residency grounds.

== Early life ==
Dylan Riley was born in Durban, and emigrated to Australia with his parents when he was eleven. He was educated at The Southport School on the Gold Coast, Queensland. He later studied sports at Bond University.

== International career ==
Dylan Riley represented Australia national school team in 2015.

In 2017, he was selected for the Australian U20 to play in the Oceania Youth Championship. He then competed in the World Rugby U-20 Championship in Georgia. Excluded from his preferred position of second centre by Izaia Perese, he played only two matches during the competition and scored one try.

In April 2021, after spending more than three years in Japan, he declared that he wanted to represent the country internationally. In the process, Jamie Joseph selected him for the first time with the Japan team in order to prepare for the test match against the British & Irish Lions. He did not play in this match, but earned his first selection a few months later against his country of origin on 23 October 2021 in Ōita.

He was called up to the national team to prepare for the 2023 World Cup. He was then selected for the final squad for the World Cup. He started in three of the four matches played by his team.

== Honours ==
Saitama Wild Knights

- 1× League One – D1: 2022
- 1× Top League: 2021
