= Jonah Mau'u =

New Zealand rugby union player

- Born: 28 July 1998 (age 28) Canberra, Australia
- Height: 183 cm (6 ft 0 in)
- Weight: 106 kg (234 lb; 16 st 10 lb)

Rugby union career
- Position(s): Flanker, Number 8
- Current team: New Orleans Gold
Senior career
Years	Team	Apps	(Points)
2021–2023	Northland	23	(20)
2023	Moana Pasifika	10	(0)
2024–	New Orleans Gold	10	(25)
- Correct as of 4 August 2024

Jonah Mau'u (born 28 July 1998) is a New Zealand rugby union player, currently playing for New Orleans Gold. His position is flanker or number 8.

== Early career ==
Mau'u attended Royal School Dungannon in Northern Ireland in 2017. While in Northern Ireland, he represented Dungannon RFC and also represented Ulster in a friendly fixture.

Mau'u was born in Canberra, Australia and has Samoan and Croatian parentage. His brothers are both internationals for Croatia at rugby. Mau'u also attended school in Auckland and Hong Kong before settling in Northland.

== Professional career ==
Mau'u was named in the Northland squad for the 2021 Bunnings NPC season, and was again named in the 2022 squad. After spending pre-season with the Moana Pasifika side, he was announced in the side for Round 1 of the 2023 Super Rugby Pacific season against the Drua.
