= Alapati Leiua =

Samoa international rugby union player

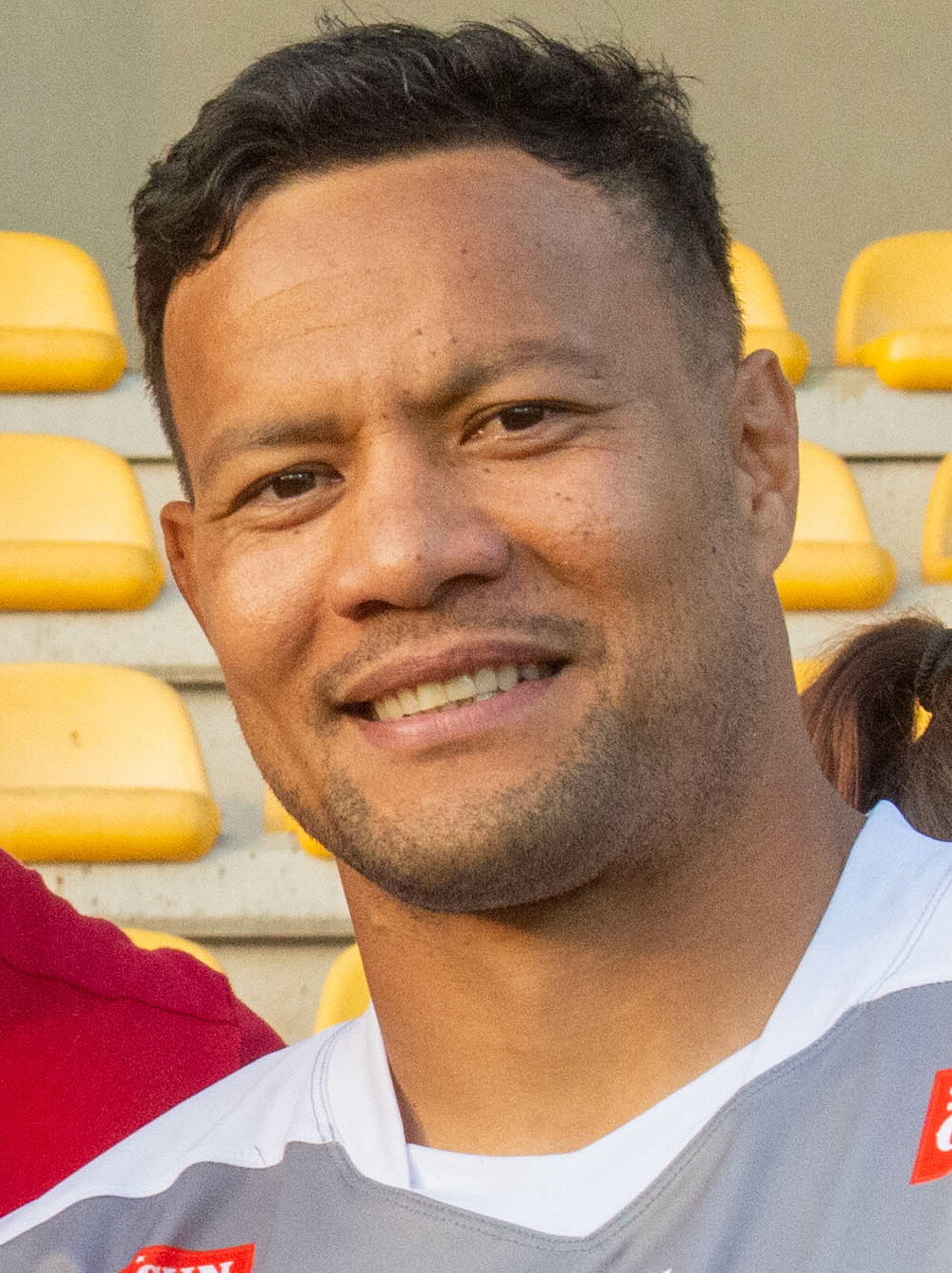
- Born: 21 September 1988 (age 38) Malie, Western Samoa
- Height: 1.85 m (6 ft 1 in)
- Weight: 100 kg (220 lb; 15 st 10 lb)
- School: Porirua College

Rugby union career
- Position(s): Centre, Wing
Senior career
Years	Team	Apps	(Points)
2009–2013	Wellington	52	(100)
2010–2014	Hurricanes	49	(45)
2014–2017	Wasps	39	(30)
2017–2022	Bristol Bears	101	(130)
2022	Waikato	7	(5)
2022	Stormers	4	(0)
2023	Shizuoka Blue Revs	3	(10)
- Correct as of 14 May 2023
International career
Years	Team	Apps	(Points)
2013–	Samoa	33	(45)
- Correct as of 14 May 2023

Alapati Leiua (born 21 September 1988) is a Samoan professional rugby union player who plays as a centre for Japan Rugby League One club Shizuoka Blue Revs and the Samoa national team.

== Professional career ==
Born and raised in Samoa, Leiua moved to Wellington as a 16 year old to attend Porirua College.

On 29 April 2014, Leiua moved to England as he signed for the Wasps in the Aviva Premiership for the 2014–15 season. It was announced on 30 January 2017 that he would be starting the 2017/18 season with Bristol
