= Marco Fepulea'i =

New Zealand rugby union player

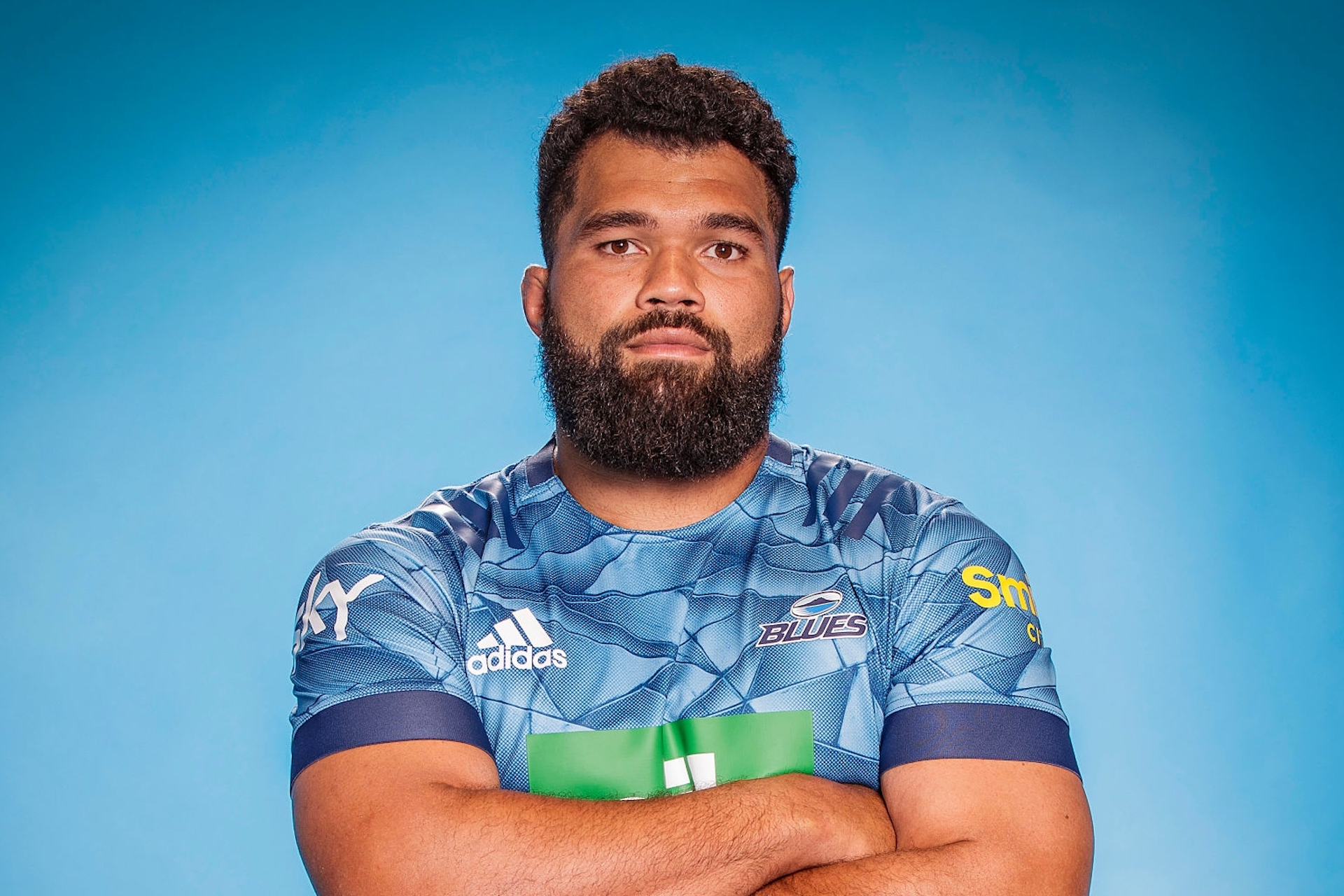
- Born: 25 April 1995 (age 31) Auckland, New Zealand
- Height: 183 cm (6 ft 0 in)
- School: Auckland Grammar School

Rugby union career
- Position: Prop
- Current team: Mont-de-Marsan
Senior career
Years	Team	Apps	(Points)
2017–2020	Auckland	22	(5)
2019–2020	Colorado Raptors	16	(5)
2021	Auckland	0	(0)
2021–2022	LA Giltinis	19	(10)
2022–2025	Colomiers	60	(5)
2025–2026	Bayonne	5	(0)
2026	Mont-de-Marsan	12	(0)
2026–	Gloucester	0	(0)
- Correct as of 19 June 2023
International career
Years	Team	Apps	(Points)
2015	Samoa U20s	5	(0)
2022	Samoa	8	(0)
- Correct as of 19 June 2023

Marco Fepulea'i (born 25 April 1995) is a New Zealand-born Samoan professional rugby union player. He plays as a prop for Mont-de-Marsan in the French Pro D2 competition after becoming a Samoa national team player, attending the Pacific Nations Cup in 2022.

Fepulea'i previously played for Samoa U20s internationally and Auckland in the Mitre 10 Cup.

He competed two seasons for the Colorado Raptors and for the La Giltinis in the American Major League Rugby competition and for the Super Rugby side Blues for the 2021 Super Rugby Aotearoa season.

On 25 August 2022, Fepuleai moves to France to join Colomiers from the 2022–23 season, option for a further season in the Pro D2 competition. Afterwards, he was a medical joker for Bayonne in the Top 14 at the start of the 2025–26 season. On 15 December 2025, he returned to the Pro D2 to sign for Mont-de-Marsan for the rest of the 2025–26 season.

On 12 June 2026, Fepuleai would move to England to sign for Gloucester in the Premiership Rugby competition for the 2026–27 season.
