= Jack Iscaro =

American rugby union player

- Born: August 4, 1997 (age 29) Germany
- Height: 185 cm (6 ft 1 in)
- Weight: 123 kg (271 lb; 19 st 5 lb)
- School: Gonzaga College High School
- University: University of California, Berkeley

Rugby union career
- Position: Loosehead Prop
- Current team: Stade Français Paris
Senior career
Years	Team	Apps	(Points)
2022–2025	Old Glory DC	76	(27)
2025-	Stade Français Paris	16	(10)
- Correct as of 23 June 2026
International career
Years	Team	Apps	(Points)
2022-	United States	21	(5)
2026	Barbarians F.C.	1	
- Correct as of 28 July 2026

Jack Iscaro (born August 4, 1997) is an American rugby union player who currently plays for Top 14 club Stade Français and for the United States men's national team. His preferred position is loosehead prop.

== Early career ==
Born in Germany, Iscaro grew up in Olney, Maryland, part of the Washington DC metro area. He attended the University of California, Berkeley where he won two Championships in 2018 and 2019.

== Club career ==
After leaving university, Iscaro signed for Glasgow Warriors on a training contract. He signed for Old Glory DC ahead of the 2020 Major League Rugby season, although didn't debut until the 2021 season due to injury. Iscaro was a stalwart for Old Glory DC since his MLR debut in 2021, starting 56 of his 76 appearances. As well as being a regular first-choice loosehead prop for the USA Eagles, the scrummager was a 4x All-MLR selection and was named in the All-MLR First XV twice, in 2023 and 2025.

In October 2025, Iscaro signed a short-term contract for French team Stade Français Paris as a medical joker. The team re-signed him later in December 2025 to a deal until 2027. The extension for Iscaro marks a significant transition in his professional career. His performance during the initial months of the 2025-2026 campaign prompted the club to offer a permanent three-year agreement

Under the terms of the new deal, Iscaro is now under contract with Stade Français until June 2027. The move solidifies his position as a primary representative of United States rugby in the European top flight. Since debuting for the USA Eagles in 2022, Iscaro has earned 18 caps and has established himself as a cornerstone of the national team’s scrum. His retention ensures he will continue to compete at the sport’s highest club level in the lead-up to the 2027 Rugby World Cup.

Iscaro was named in the Barbarian F.C. Men's Team ahead of the June 27, 2026, clash with Wales at Allianz Stadium Twickenham. The Baa-Baas have named a strong squad containing 20 internationals from 12 different nations.

== International career ==
Iscaro represented the United States under-20 team in 2017. He earned selection for the full United States side in 2022, making his debut against Kenya.

== Honours ==
Old Glory DC

- All Major League Ruby first team (2023; 2025)
