= Adrea Cocagi =

Fijian rugby union player

- Born: 1 March 1994 (age 32)
- Height: 186 cm (6 ft 1 in)
- Weight: 105 kg (16 st 7 lb)

Rugby union career
- Position: Centre
Senior career
Years	Team	Apps	(Points)
2012–13	L'Aquila		
2013–14	Stade Français		
2014–16	Tarbes Pyrénées		
2016–20	USA Perpignan		
2020–	Castres Olympique		
International career
Years	Team	Apps	(Points)
2022–	Fiji	2	(0)

Adrea Cocagi (born 1 March 1994) is a Fijian professional rugby union player.

== Biography ==
Cocagi, raised in Serua Province, is the youngest of eight brothers and picked up rugby union while in primary school. He attended Lomary Secondary School and in his late teens was offered a scholarship by the National Rugby League's Newcastle Knights, but ended up pursuing a career in rugby union Based in France since 2013, Cocagi has played for Stade Français, Tarbes Pyrénées, USA Perpignan and most recently Castres Olympique.

=== International ===
Cocagi represented the Fiji under-20s at the 2014 IRB Junior World Championship. He had to wait until 2022 to receive a call up to the Fiji Test side and made his debut off the bench against Ireland at Aviva Stadium, Dublin.

== See also ==
- List of Fiji national rugby union players
