= Katsuki Furuse =

Japanese international rugby union referee

- Born: 25 January 2002 (age 24) Ōnojō, Fukuoka Prefecture, Japan

Rugby union career
- Position: Hooker
Refereeing career
Years	Competition	Apps
2021–	Japan Rugby League One	
2023	National Provincial Championship	
2023	Heartland Championship	
2024	World Rugby U20 Trophy	
2024–	Test matches	

Katsuki Furuse (古瀬 勝貴, Furuse Katsuki; born January 25, 2002) is a Japanese rugby union and World Rugby referee.

== Background ==
Furuse was born on 25 January 2002 in Ōnojō, Fukuoka Prefecture. Growing up, Furuse played rugby in junior high school, playing as a hooker and serving as his team's captain. However, he opted to become a referee rather than a player. In 2018, Furuse passed the Kyusyu Rugby Football Union B-level exam, becoming the youngest person to obtain a referee license. In 2020, Furuse enrolled at Waseda University and joined the Waseda University Rugby Football Club as a referee.

== Refereeing career ==
In 2021, Furuse was selected by the Japan Rugby Football Union as an A-class certified referee. That year, at 19, Furuse refereed his first professional match in the Top Challenge League.

In 2023, Furuse was appointed to officiate at the National Provincial Championship, officiating a match between Northland and Canterbury. In 2024, Furuse was selected as an assistant referee at the Six Nations Under 20s Championship. Later that year, Furuse was selected by World Rugby to officiate the World Rugby U20 Trophy, in an initiative to develop young talent and expand the pool for the 2027 Rugby World Cup. Furuse made his test debut that same year on 16 November, officiating a test match between Hong Kong and Brazil.

In 2025, during the World Rugby U20 Championship match between Australia and South Africa, Furuse was forced to use a mobile phone to communicate with the television match official (TMO) following equipment failure. Later that year, Furuse was invited by the French Rugby Federation as part of an exchange program. Furuse officiated two Pro D2 matches that season, earning praise for his performances.
