= Vuate Karawalevu =

Fiji international rugby league footballer

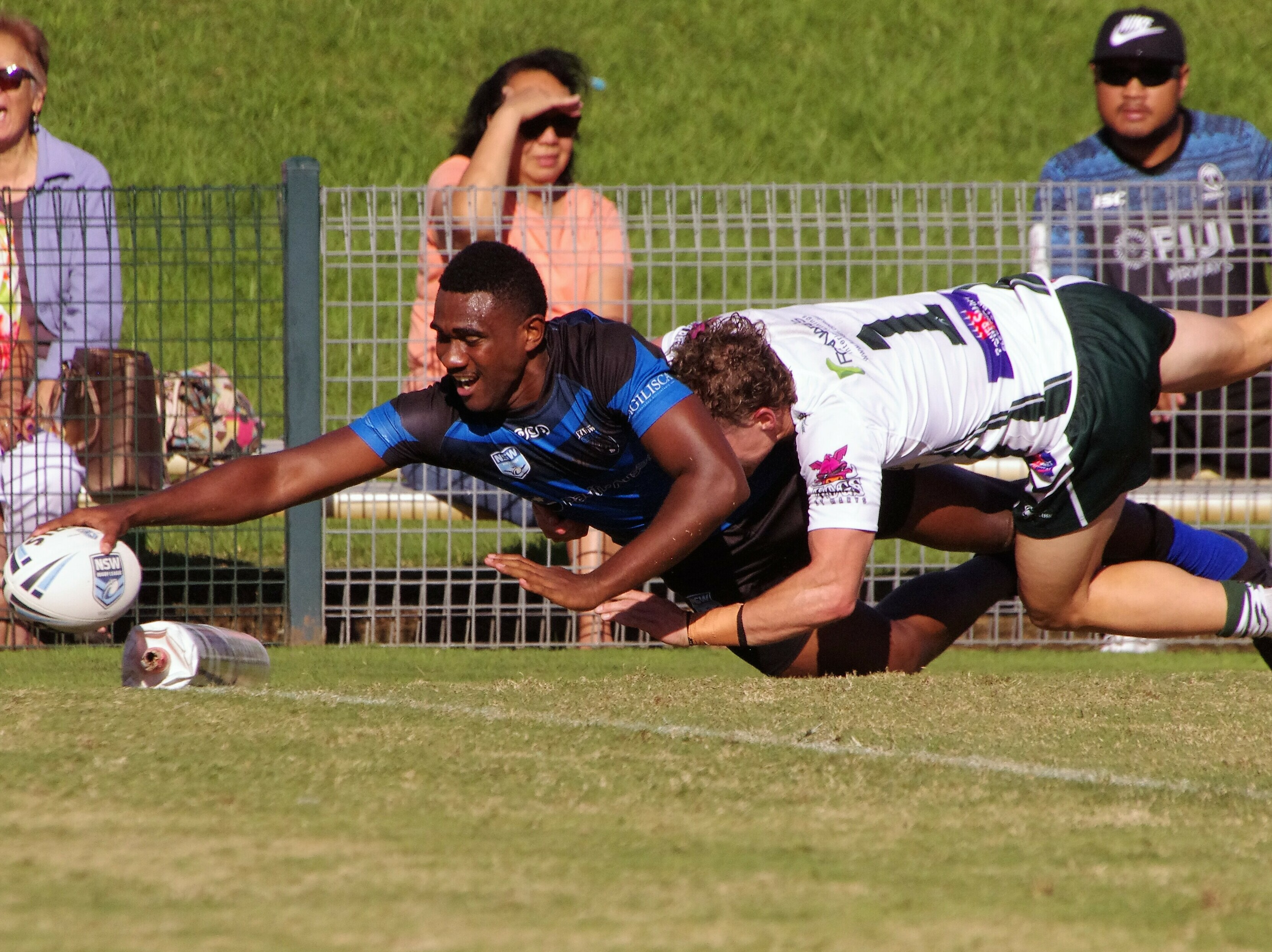

Personal information
- Full name: Vuate Karawalevu
- Born: 5 March 2001 (age 25) Suva, Fiji
- Height: 193 cm (6 ft 4 in)
- Weight: 104 kg (229 lb; 16 st 5 lb)

Playing information

Rugby league
- Position: Wing, Fullback
Club
Years	Team	Pld	T	G	FG	P
2023	Sydney Roosters	0	0	0	0	0
Representative
Years	Team	Pld	T	G	FG	P
2022	Fiji Bati	3	0	0	0	0

Rugby union
Club
Years	Team	Pld	T	G	FG	P
2024	NSW Waratahs	2	1	0	0	5
2025	Fijian Drua	7	4	0	0	20
2025-	Castres	16	4	0	0	20
	Total	25	9	0	0	45
Representative
Years	Team	Pld	T	G	FG	P
2024–	Fiji	7	4	0	0	20
- Source: As of 3 June 2025

Vuate Karawalevu (born 5 March 2001) is a Fijian professional Dual code footballer who plays as a winger for the Fijian Drua in the Super Rugby Pacific and Fiji at international level. He signed for Top 14 side, Castres Olympique in 2025.

== Background ==
Karawalevu was born in Suva, Central Division, Fiji.

He was educated at the Marist Brothers High School.

== Playing career ==
=== Club career ===
Karawalevu was contracted to the Sydney Roosters in the NRL playing in their Jersey Flegg cup side in 2024

While under contract at the Roosters, he played for the Kaiviti Silktails in the Ron Massey Cup in 2021–2023.

Karawalevu also played in 2021 for the Roosters Jersey Flegg Cup side.

Playing as a winger he scored 7 tries in just 6 games for the North Sydney Bears in the 2022 NSW Cup.

=== International career ===
In October 2022 Karawalevu was named in the Fiji squad for the 2021 Rugby League World Cup.

In October 2022 he made his international début for the Fiji Bati side against Italy.

In October 2023 Karawalevu has rejoined the 15-a-side game with the NSW Waratahs ahead of the 2024 Super Rugby Pacific campaign on a two-year deal.

After not being given enough game time at the Waratahs, he was being recruited by the Fijian Drua for the 2025 Super Rugby Pacific season scoring 4 tries in his debut season.
