= Vili Helu =

American rugby union player (born 1996)

- Full name: Viliami Helu
- Born: 20 March 1996 (age 30) Alamo, California, United States
- Height: 193 cm (6 ft 4 in)
- Weight: 107 kg (236 lb; 16 st 12 lb)

Rugby union career
- Position: Lock / Flanker / Number 8
- Current team: Kurita Water Gush
Senior career
Years	Team	Apps	(Points)
2020–2023	Rugby ATL	44	(20)
2024–2025	San Diego Legion	31	(20)
2025-	Kurita Water Gush	12	(15)
- Correct as of 19 December 2023
International career
Years	Team	Apps	(Points)
2022–	USA Falcons XV		
2022–	United States	23	(5)
- Correct as of 6 July 2025

Vili Helu (born 20 March 1996) is an American rugby union player, currently playing for Rugby ATL. His preferred position is flanker or number 8, but he can also play as a lock.

== Early career ==
Helu is from Alamo, California, and was selected for Team USA for the Youth Olympic Games. He attended Saint Mary's College of California where he achieved All-American honours.

== Professional career ==
Helu signed for Rugby ATL in 2019 ahead of the 2020 Major League Rugby season. He has remained with the team since.

Helu toured with the USA Falcons XV side to South Africa in 2022. He made his debut for the full United States side in 2022, making his debut against Kenya.
