= Ben Nee-Nee =

Samoa international rugby union player

Benjamin Petaia Nee-Nee
- Born: Benjamin Petaia Nee-Nee; 12 May 1993 (age 33) New Zealand
- Height: 198 cm (6 ft 6 in)
- Weight: 114 kg (17 st 13 lb; 251 lb)
- School: Botany Downs Secondary College

Rugby union career
- Position(s): Lock, Flanker
- Current team: Kamaishi Seawaves
Senior career
Years	Team	Apps	(Points)
2021–	Kamaishi Seawaves	67	(70)
Provincial / State sides
Years	Team	Apps	(Points)
2015–2017	Auckland	13	(5)
2018–2019	North Harbour	19	(0)
Super Rugby
Years	Team	Apps	(Points)
2018	Blues	8	(0)
International career
Years	Team	Apps	(Points)
2018-	Samoa	17	(0)

Ben Nee-Nee (born 12 May 1993) is a New Zealand rugby union player who plays for the Blues in the Super Rugby competition. His position of choice is lock.
