= Conner Mooneyham =

American rugby union player

- Born: 28 March 1996 (age 30) Rocklin, California, United States
- Height: 183 cm (6 ft 0 in)
- Weight: 93 kg (205 lb; 14 st 9 lb)

Rugby union career
- Position: Wing
Senior career
Years	Team	Apps	(Points)
2021–2022	Austin Gilgronis	23	(42)
2023–2024	Seattle Seawolves	21	(15)
2025–2026	Anthem Carolina	9	(17)
- Correct as of 8 December 2025
International career
Years	Team	Apps	(Points)
2024–	United States	7	(10)
- Correct as of 8 December 2025

Conner Mooneyham (born 28 March 1996) is an American rugby union player who played for the Anthem Carolina in Major League Rugby (MLR). His preferred position is wing.

== Early career ==
Mooneyham is from Rocklin, California but grew up in Magnolia, Texas before attending Life University.

== Professional career ==
Mooneyham was the first selection in the 2020 MLR Draft for the Dallas Jackals, however joined the Austin Gilgronis ahead of the 2021 Major League Rugby season. He remained with the team until it was disbanded at the end of the 2022 season, where he was picked up by Rugby ATL in the dispersal draft, however chose to sign with the Seattle Seawolves instead. He would compete for Seattle in the 2023 and 2024 seasons, before being traded to Anthem Carolina ahead of the 2025 season.

Mooneyham made his debut for the United States national team in July 2024, debuting against Scotland. He scored his first tries against Canada in September.
