= Thomas Tu'avao =

US international rugby union player (born 1993)

Thomas Tu’avao
- Full name: Thomas James Tu’avao
- Born: October 27, 1993 (age 33) Cheshire, England
- Height: 6 ft 3 in (191 cm)
- Weight: 230 lb (104 kg)
- School: Wade Deacon High School; Lincoln High School
- University: American River College

Rugby union career
- Position: Back-row
Senior career
| Years | Team | Apps | (Points) |
| 2020– | Utah Warriors | | |
International career
| Years | Team | Apps | (Points) |
| 2023– | United States | 5 | (5) |

Thomas James Tu’avao (born October 27, 1993) is an English-born American professional rugby union player.

== Biography ==
Tu’avao, son of former Leigh Centurions rugby league player Hamoni Tu'avao, was born in Cheshire in the north of England and is of Tongan descent. He attended Wade Deacon High School and played rugby league for Widnes St Maries during his youth. Finishing his schooling in California, Tu’avao was an American football player at Stockton's Lincoln High School and continued with the sport in college, playing as a defensive lineman.

A back-row forward, Tu’avao moved to Utah after completing missionary work for the LDS Church and began playing for the Utah Misfits. He has played Major League Rugby for the Utah Warriors since 2020.

He made his international debut for the United States in 2023, gaining his first cap against Romania in Bucharest.

== See also ==
- List of United States national rugby union players
