= Inia Tabuavou =

Fijian rugby union player (born 2002)

- Born: 31 August 2002 (age 24)
- Height: 185 cm (6 ft 1 in)
- Weight: 101 kg (223 lb)
- School: Natabua High School

Rugby union career
- Position(s): Wing, Centre, Fullback
Senior career
Years	Team	Apps	(Points)
2021–2024	Racing 92	21	(15)
2025 -	Fijian Drua	11	
International career
Years	Team	Apps	(Points)
2024–	Fiji	10	(5)

Inia Tabuavou (born 31 August 2002) is a Fijian international rugby union player.

Raised in Lautoka, Tabuavou was educated at Natabua High School. His mother Salesia was widowed in 2013 and the family were financially supported by Inia's elder brother, a member of the Fijian military.

Tabuavou is a strong running centre and plays his rugby in France with Racing 92.

In 2024, Tabuavou made his debut for Fiji in a match against Georgia. He made his second appearance for Fiji against New Zealand in San Diego on 19 July 2024. Fiji lost the game 5 - 47. During the game Tabuavou gave a solid tackle to Cortez Ratima which lead to a concussion.

2 August 2024 Inia Tabuavou signed a 2-year deal with the Fijian Drua for 2025-2026 Super Rugby season.

== See also ==
- List of Fiji national rugby union players
