= Iakopo Mapu =

Samoan rugby union player

- Full name: Iakopo Petelo Mapu
- Born: 4 November 1997 (age 29)
- Height: 183 cm (6 ft 0 in)
- Weight: 106 kg (16 st 10 lb; 234 lb)
- School: Massey High School

Rugby union career
- Position(s): Flanker, Number 8
Senior career
Years	Team	Apps	(Points)
2024–2025	Northampton Saints	7	(10)
2025–	Stade Français Paris	0	(0)
International career
Years	Team	Apps	(Points)
2018–	Samoa	14	(5)
- Correct as of 15 July 2024

Iakopo Petelo Mapu (born 4 November 1997) is a Samoan international rugby union player.

Mapu grew up in the village of Fale'ula on the north coast of Upolu, Samoa's second-largest island, where he was educated at Wesley College (Samoa). He came to New Zealand on a rugby scholarship to finish his schooling at Massey High School in Auckland.

A try-scoring number eight, Mapu first played test rugby for Samoa in 2018, making his debut off the bench against the USA in San Sebastián, Spain. He is contracted to Moana Pasifika and currently plays with Kia Toa.

On 21 November 2024, Mapu would travel to England to sign for Northampton Saints in the Gallagher Premiership for the rest of the 2024–25 season.

On 1 July 2025, Mapu would move to France as he signs for Top 14 side Stade Français Paris for the 2025-26 season after spending a season at Northampton.

== See also ==
- List of Samoa national rugby union players
