= 2023–24 Japan Rugby League One – Division 1 =

Rugby union competition in Japan

2023–24 Japan Rugby League One – D1
- Countries: Japan
- Number of teams: 12
- Date: 9 December 2023 – 26 May 2024
- Champions: Brave Lupus Tokyo
- Promoted: Mie Heat
- Relegated: Hanazono Liners
- Matches played: 106
- Attendance: 972,434 (average 9,174 per match)
- Highest attendance: 56,486 (Saitama Wild Knights vs. Brave Lupus Tokyo, 26 May 2024)
- Top point scorer: Bryn Gatland, Kobe Steelers (217)
- Top try scorer: Malo Tuitama, Shizuoka Blue Revs (15)

Official website
- league-one.jp/en

The 2023–24 Japan Rugby League One – Division 1 season is the thirteenth top flight league season played from December 2023 through to May 2024, in the newly rebranded Japan Rugby League One. The competition consisted of twelve teams, including one promoted team from Division 2, the Mie Heat.

== Format ==
The format and schedule was announced on 6 September 2023. It will consist of a round-robin fixture, before entering into a knockout style play-off for the final four teams. It featured two conferences (A, B). Teams in each conference played the teams in their respective conference twice (one at home, one away), and six matches against all the teams in the other conference, three being at home and three away. Each team played a total of sixteen seasonal fixtures, plus additional play-off matches, including relegation play-offs.

== Teams and personnel ==
Club	Prefecture	Coach	Stadium	Capacity
Black Rams Tokyo リコーブラックラムズ東京	Tokyo	Peter Hewat	Komazawa Olympic Park Stadium	20,010
Brave Lupus Tokyo 東芝ブレイブルーパス東京	Tokyo	Todd Blackadder	Ajinomoto Stadium	49,970
Hanazono Liners 花園近鉄ライナーズ	Osaka	Yoshitake Mizuma	Hanazono Rugby Stadium	30,000
Kobe Steelers コベルコ神戸スティーラーズ	Hyōgo	Dave Rennie	Noevir Stadium Kobe	30,132
Mie Heat 三重ホンダヒート	Mie	Kieran Crowley	Mie Suzuka Sports Garden	12,000
Sagamihara DynaBoars 三菱重工相模原ダイナボアーズ	Kanagawa	Glenn Delaney	Sagamihara Gion Stadium	15,300
Saitama Wild Knights 埼玉パナソニックワイルドナイツ	Saitama	Robbie Deans	Kumagaya Rugby Ground	24,000
Shizuoka Blue Revs 静岡ブルーレヴズ	Shizuoka	Yuichiro Fujii	Yamaha Stadium	15,165
Spears Tokyo Bay クボタスピアーズ船橋・東京ベイ	Chiba	Frans Ludeke	Edogawa Stadium	6,950
Tokyo Sungoliath 東京サントリーサンゴリアス	Tokyo	Tanka Kiyonori	Chichibunomiya Rugby Stadium	27,188
Toyota Verblitz トヨタヴェルブリッツ	Aichi	Ben Herring	Paloma Mizuho Rugby Stadium	15,000
Yokohama Eagles 横浜キヤノンイーグルス	Kanagawa	Keisuke Sawaki	NHK Spring Mitsuzawa Football Stadium	15,454

Locations of the 2023–24 Division 1 teams
2023–24 Division 1 teams in Greater Tokyo Area

== Ladder ==
Pos	Team	Pld	W	D	L	PF	PA	PD	TF	TA	TB	LB	Pts	Qualification or relegation
1	Saitama Wild Knights	16	16	0	0	747	275	+472	106	39	11	0	75	Qualification for Play-off Semi-finals
2	Brave Lupus Tokyo (C)	16	14	1	1	554	373	+181	81	49	7	0	65	Qualification for Play-off Semi-finals
3	Tokyo Sungoliath	16	10	1	5	584	425	+159	83	58	5	3	50	Qualification for Play-off Semi-finals
4	Yokohama Eagles	16	10	0	6	518	446	+72	75	63	6	3	49	Qualification for Play-off Semi-finals
5	Kobe Steelers	16	9	1	6	647	459	+188	89	59	5	2	45	
6	Spears Tokyo Bay	16	8	1	7	554	447	+107	78	63	5	5	44	
7	Toyota Verblitz	16	9	0	7	498	450	+48	72	59	5	2	43	
8	Shizuoka Blue Revs	16	6	2	8	501	513	−12	71	76	3	2	33	
9	Sagamihara DynaBoars	16	6	0	10	457	637	−180	62	93	0	3	27	
10	Black Rams Tokyo (O)	16	3	0	13	321	503	−182	46	69	1	4	17	Qualification for relegation play-offs
11	Mie Heat (O)	16	1	0	15	242	744	−502	32	112	0	3	7	Qualification for relegation play-offs
12	Hanazono Liners (R)	16	1	0	15	353	704	−351	51	102	0	2	6	Qualification for relegation play-offs

Updated to match(es) played on unknown. Source: league-one.jp
Rules for classification: 1) Points; 2) Number of wins; 3) Point difference
(C) Champion; (O) Play-off winner(s); (R) Relegated

== Fixtures ==
Each team will play five teams twice and six teams once for a total of sixteen home and away matches.

Home \ Away	BRT	BLT	HL	KS	MH	SDB	SWK	SBR	STB	TSG	TV	YE
Black Rams Tokyo	—						26–50	29–36			18–45	
Brave Lupus Tokyo	40–33	—		40–40	40–12	41–19		43–30	24–20	36–27		27–7
Hanazono Liners	34–23	32–50	—		19–20	36–46	0–49		19–56		14–47	33–52
Kobe Steelers		39–46	60–17	—	80–15		18–28	63–19	34–38	27–36	57–22	
Mie Heat	14–24	7–8		31–33	—	26–31		13–62	0–75	16–34		21–50
Sagamihara DynaBoars	24–31		30–29	14–43		—	21–81	53–45			20–34	35–40
Saitama Wild Knights	44–17	36–24	33–24			53–12	—			24–20	43–27	53–12
Shizuoka Blue Revs		20–59		26–30	43–14		19–45	—	31–31	25–29	24–8	
Spears Tokyo Bay		20–22		39–29	61–24	28–34	22–55	19–23	—	26–52	27–31	
Tokyo Sungoliath	62–0	19–26	34–14	44–36	60–10			31–31	26–45	—		35–37
Toyota Verblitz	15–8		47–30		54–7	54–40	7–40			38–39	—	35–31
Yokohama Eagles	24–8		66–26			43–19	14–43	34–17	26–29		24–22	—

Updated to match(es) played on 5 May 2024. Source: league-one.jp
Legend: Blue = home team win; Yellow = draw; Red = away team win.

== Promotion/Relegation play-offs ==
The relegation play-offs will take place in May 2024.

=== Overview ===
Team 1	Agg.	Team 2	1st leg	2nd leg
(D1) Black Rams Tokyo	95–21	Green Rockets Tokatsu (D2)	40–21	55–0
(D1) Mie Heat	72–63	Shuttles Aichi (D2)	57–39	15–24
(D1) Hanazono Liners	42–56	Urayasu D-Rocks (D2)	12–21	30–35

=== Matches ===
All times Japan Standard Time (JST) (UTC+9)

Black Rams Tokyo v Green Rockets Tokatsu

18 May 2024
14:30 JST (UTC+9)

Green Rockets Tokatsu	21–40	Black Rams Tokyo
	Report

Kashiwanoha Stadium
Attendance: 5,062

25 May 2024
14:30 JST (UTC+9)

Black Rams Tokyo	55–0	Green Rockets Tokatsu
	Report

Sagamihara Gion Stadium
Referee: 2,523

Mie Heat v Shuttles Aichi

18 May 2024
12:00 JST (UTC+9)

Shuttles Aichi	39–57	Mie Heat
	Report

Paloma Mizuho Rugby Stadium
Attendance: 2,771

25 May 2024
12:00 JST (UTC+9)

Mie Heat	15–24	Shuttles Aichi
	Report

Mie Suzuka Sports Garden
Attendance: 4,230

Hanazono Liners v Urayasu D-Rocks

18 May 2024
12:00 JST (UTC+9)

Urayasu D-Rocks	21–12	Hanazono Liners
	Report

Edogawa Stadium
Attendance: 5,004

24 May 2024
19:00 JST (UTC+9)

Hanazono Liners	30–35	Urayasu D-Rocks
	Report

Hanazono Rugby Stadium
Attendance: 7,883

== Season play-offs ==
Bracket

Semi-finals
18 May – Aoyama (Tokyo)
Saitama Wild Knights	20
Yokohama Eagles	17
19 May – Aoyama (Tokyo)
Brave Lupus Tokyo	28
Tokyo Sungoliath	20

Final
26 May – Shinjuku (Tokyo)
Saitama Wild Knights	20
Brave Lupus Tokyo	24
Third place
25 May – Aoyama (Tokyo)
Tokyo Sungoliath	40
Yokohama Eagles	33

=== Semi-finals ===
18 May 2024
14:05 JST (UTC+9)

Saitama Wild Knights	20–17	Yokohama Eagles
	Report

Chichibunomiya Rugby Stadium
Attendance: 15,464

19 May 2024
14:05 JST (UTC+9)

Brave Lupus Tokyo	28–20	Tokyo Sungoliath
	Report

Chichibunomiya Rugby Stadium
Attendance: 17,133

=== 3rd Place Playoff ===
25 May 2024
12:05 JST (UTC+9)

Tokyo Sungoliath	40 - 33	Yokohama Eagles
	Report

Chichibunomiya Rugby Stadium
Attendance: 9,509

=== Final ===
26 May 2024
15:05 JST (UTC+9)

Saitama Wild Knights	20 - 24	Brave Lupus Tokyo
	Report

Japan National Stadium
Attendance: 56,486

== Attendances ==
The average attendance was 8,250.

#	Club	Average attendance
1	Tokyo Sungoliath	14,039
2	Toyota Verblitz	12,884
3	Kobe Steelers	10,596
4	Yokohama Eagles	10,531
5	Saitama Wild Knights	10,376
6	Brave Lupus Tokyo	10,045
7	Spears Tokyo Bay	8,188
8	Shizuoka Blue Revs	7,640
9	Black Rams Tokyo	7,511
10	Hanazono Liners	5,550
11	Sagamihara DynaBoars	5,519
12	Mie Heat	4,271
