= Porirua College =

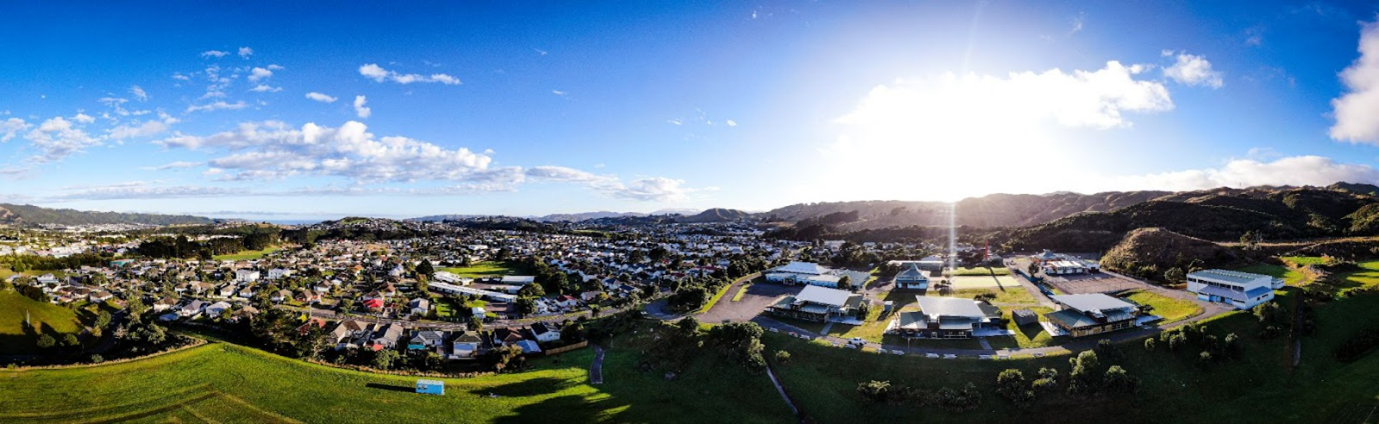

Address
- 64 Driver Crescent, Cannons Creek, Porirua, New Zealand

Information
- Type: Co-educational state secondary school
- Motto: "Whiti Te Rā" – The Rising Sun
- Established: 1968
- Ministry of Education Institution no.: 255
- Principal: Ragne Maxwell
- Enrolment: 577
- Website: Official website

Porirua College is a co-educational state secondary school located in Cannons Creek, Porirua, New Zealand. The school provides education to students from Year 9 to 13 (ages 12 to 18) in Porirua East.

== Demographics ==
As of July 2022, Porirua College had an enrolment of 606 students, with equal representation of male and female students. Among the student population, 60% identified as Pacific Islanders, and 29% identified as Māori.

As of 2024, Porirua College has an Equity Index of 532, placing it amongst schools whose students have the most socioeconomic barriers to achievement (roughly equivalent to deciles 1 and 2 under the former socio-economic decile system).

== History ==
Established in 1968, Porirua College underwent a complete rebuild and now features modern learning spaces. In 2020, the Education Review Office (ERO) recognized the school's curriculum as culturally responsive, offering diverse learning opportunities.

== Notable alumni ==
- Aaradhna – singer and songwriter
- Robbie Fruean – rugby union player
- Neil Ieremia – dancer and choreographer
- Ayesha Leti-I'iga – rugby union player
- Tupe Lualua – dancer and choreographer
