= Kanji Shimokawa =

Japan international rugby union player

Kanji Shimokawa 下川甲嗣
- Full name: Kanji Shimokawa
- Born: 7 January 1999 (age 27) Fukuoka, Japan
- Height: 187 cm (6 ft 2 in)
- Weight: 100 kg (220 lb; 15 st 10 lb)
- School: Shuyukan High School
- University: Waseda University

Rugby union career
- Position(s): Flanker, Lock
- Current team: Suntory Sungoliath
Youth career
- 2017-2021: Waseda University
Senior career
Years	Team	Apps	(Points)
2020-	Suntory Sungoliath	77	(30)
- Correct as of 26 July 2024
International career
Years	Team	Apps	(Points)
2018	Japan under-20		
2022-	Japan XV	3	(0)
2022-	Japan	33	(5)
- Correct as of 26 July 2024

Kanji Shimokawa (下川 甲嗣, Shimokawa Kanji; born 7 January 1999) is a Japanese rugby union player who plays for Tokyo Sungoliath in the Japan Rugby League One.

== Career ==
=== Club career ===
Shimokawa joined Tokyo Sungoliath in 2020, he made 2 appearances in his first season including scoring on debut in a 94–31 win over NTT Communications Shining Arcs.

=== International career ===
He featured for the Japan XV three times against Australia A.

He made his debut coming off the bench against New Zealand. In 2023 he was called up to the Rugby World Cup to replace Uwe Helu. He went on to make his Rugby World Cup debut and first international start against Chile.
