= Malie =

Village in Upolu, Samoa

Coordinates: 13°48′S 171°49′W

Malie is a village on the island of Upolu in Samoa. It is located on the north coast in the Electoral Constituency (Faipule District) of Sagaga Le Usoga which forms part of the larger political district of Tuamasaga. The village has been a traditional headquarters for the Malietoa, one of the four paramount families and royal titles of Samoa. The village has a population of 2247.

== Geography ==
Malie's western border lies by the western bay at Vaifoa, next to Fale'ula. Between the two villages is the promontory Satea. Another five minutes further west and inland lies Malie itself with its large malae, on which lies the large stone tomb of Malietoa Molī, father of Malietoa Laupepa. Immediately adjacent is Lalau, forming Malie's boundary.

== Tuamasaga ==
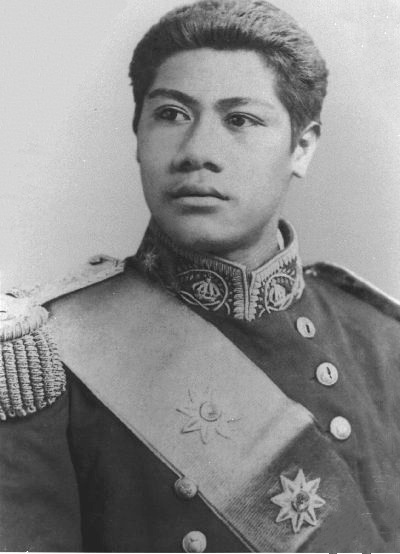
One of four Paramount Chiefs of Samoa, Malietoa Tanumafili I

As part of Tuamasaga, both Malie and Afega play the leading role in governance of the region and are addressed collectively as "Tuisamau ma Auimatagi" in matters of national importance, particularly when Pule and Tumua (Samoa's orator chiefs) are gathered in ceremony. Afega holds preeminence as the administrative capital of Tuamasaga while Malie holds equal preeminence as the seat of the Malietoa as well as the Auimatagi and the faleupolu of Malie. The great fono (council) of Tuamasaga meets at Malie during times of peace and is why the malae at Malie is called malae o le filemu (gathering place of peace). In many affairs – especially during war – Auimatagi is called upon on behalf of Malie in deliberations to determine whether and when and where the fono is to take place.

== Malietoa ==
The residential grounds of the Malietoa are called 'Feagaimaleata' ("together with the dawn"). Further inland one can still see the stones on which the heads of the human sacrifices were smashed prior to being prepared for Malietoa Faigā's meals.

The current Malietoa, Malietoa Molī, was bestowed the honor in Malie in August 2018. The right of the matai of Malie to bestow the honor came under legal challenges, with criminal contempt of court charges being laid against sixteen chiefs, though those challenges were ultimately dismissed. The matter has since been resolved with all parties concerned acquiescing to the judgement rendered by the Lands & Titles Court together with the wishes of both Afega and Malie to have Malietoa Molī continue as the current holder of the paramount title.

== Fa'alupega: Honorific Salutations of Malie ==
Tulouna a Auimatagi

Tulouna a lo outou to'afitu

Tulouna Fa'amausili ma Mauala'ivao

Tulouna o lou alii, o lau Susuga a Malietoa
