= 2025 World Rugby Pacific Nations Cup =

Rugby union competition

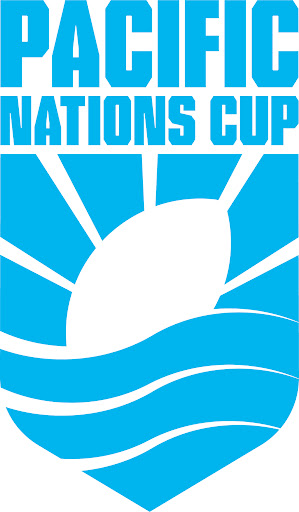

Tournament details
- Host: United States (Finals)
- Dates: 23 August – 20 September 2025 (28 days)
- Teams: Canada; Fiji; Japan; Samoa; Tonga; United States

Final positions
- Champions: Fiji (7th title)
- Runner-up: Japan
- Third place: Tonga
- Fourth place: Canada

Tournament statistics
- Matches played: 11
- Tries scored: 86 (7.82 per match)
- Attendance: 56,305 (5,119 per match)

2027 Rugby World Cup – Pacific qualification
Tournament details
- Dates: 23 August 2025 – 20 September 2025
- No. of nations: 4

The 2025 World Rugby Pacific Nations Cup (Note: Known as the Asahi Super Dry Pacific Nations Cup for sponsorship reasons.) was the seventeenth Pacific Nations Cup (PNC) tournament and was the second edition under its new format that was launched in 2024. World Rugby announced in 2023 that the Finals series hosts will be the United States, alternating from the previous Finals series hosts Japan.

Fiji were the defending champions, after they defeated Japan in the 2024 final 41–17.

== World Cup qualification ==
The 2025 edition also doubled up as the Pacific (Americas North, Oceania and Japan) qualifying process for the 2027 Men's Rugby World Cup, with the top three teams (outside of Fiji and Japan who have already qualified) qualifying for the Rugby World Cup as Pacific 1, 2 and 3. The remaining sixth team in the competition, later had two further opportunities to qualify. Initially, they advanced as Pacific 4 to a Sudamérica / Pacific play-off match against Sudamérica 2, for a chance to qualify for the World Cup as the Sudamérica / Pacific play-off winner. The loser of that match then advanced to the Final Qualification Tournament.

(Rankings as of first qualification match in this region)

| Nation | Rank | Began play | Qualifying status |
|---|---|---|---|
| Australia | 6 | N/A | Qualified with Top 12 finish at 2023 World Cup |
| Canada | 25 | 23 August 2025 | Qualified on 6 September 2025 / as Pacific 2 on 20 September 2025 |
| Fiji | 9 | N/A | Qualified with Top 12 finish at 2023 World Cup |
| Japan | 14 | N/A | Qualified with Top 12 finish at 2023 World Cup |
| New Zealand | 1 | N/A | Qualified with Top 12 finish at 2023 World Cup |
| Samoa | 13 | 23 August 2025 | Advanced to Pacific / Sudamérica qualifying play-off as Pacific 4 on 14 September 2025 |
| Tonga | 19 | 23 August 2025 | Qualified on 6 September 2025 / as Pacific 1 on 20 September 2025 |
| United States | 16 | 23 August 2025 | Qualified as Pacific 3 on 14 September 2025 |

== Pool stage ==
The Pool stage effectively divided the six teams in two zones, a Southern Hemisphere Pacific islands group featuring traditional rivals Fiji, Samoa and Tonga, and a Northern Hemisphere North Pacific Rim group containing North American rivals Canada and the United States, along with Japan. Each team played a single round robin within its zone, with the top two teams in each zone moving on to playoff semifinals which are inter-zonal. The third-placed team in each group also played an inter-zonal tie to decide 5th and 6th place.

=== Pool A ===
| Pos | Team | Pld | W | D | L | PF | PA | PD | TF | TA | TB | LB | Pts | Qualification |
|---|---|---|---|---|---|---|---|---|---|---|---|---|---|---|
| 1 | Fiji | 2 | 2 | 0 | 0 | 61 | 25 | +36 | 8 | 3 | 2 | 0 | 10 | Advance to Semi-finals |
| 2 | Tonga | 2 | 1 | 0 | 1 | 40 | 48 | −8 | 4 | 6 | 0 | 0 | 4 | Advance to Semi-finals |
| 3 | Samoa | 2 | 0 | 0 | 2 | 31 | 59 | −28 | 4 | 7 | 0 | 0 | 0 | |

Source: World Rugby

23 August 2025
15:00 TOT (UTC+13)

| Tonga | 30–16 | Samoa |
| Try: Moala 7' c Takulua 25' c Moli 75' c Con: Pellegrini (3/3) 8', 26', 77'; Pen: Pellegrini (3/3) 19', 36', 67' | Report | Try: Tuitama 61' m Nanai 80+1' m Pen: Alatimu (2/2) 32', 39' |

Teufaiva Sport Stadium, Nukuʻalofa
Attendance: 3,000
Referee: Angus Gardner (Australia)

| FB | 15 | Charles Piutau |
| RW | 14 | Fine Inisi | (substituted off) 76' |
| OC | 13 | Solomone Kata |
| IC | 12 | Fetuli Paea |
| LW | 11 | John Tapueluelu |
| FH | 10 | Patrick Pellegrini |
| SH | 9 | Sonatane Takulua | (substituted off) 57' |
| N8 | 8 | Lotu Inisi |
| BF | 7 | Siosiua Moala | (substituted off) 76' |
| OF | 6 | Tanginoa Halaifonua |
| RL | 5 | Harison Mataele | (substituted off) 57' |
| LL | 4 | Leva Fifita |
| TP | 3 | Ben Tameifuna (c) | (substituted off) 52' |
| HK | 2 | Siua Maile | (substituted off) 52' |
| LP | 1 | Siegfried Fisiʻihoi | (substituted off) 52' |
Substitutions:
| HK | 16 | Sam Moli | (substituted on) 52' |
| PR | 17 | Salesi Tuifua | (substituted on) 52' |
| PR | 18 | Solomone Tukuafu | (substituted on) 52' |
| LK | 19 | Tupou Afungia | (substituted on) 57' |
| FL | 20 | Fotu Lokotui | (substituted on) 76' |
| SH | 21 | Augustine Pulu | (substituted on) 57' |
| FB | 22 | Josiah Unga |
| WG | 23 | Nikolai Foliaki | (substituted on) 76' |
Coach:
Tevita Tuʻifua

| FB | 15 | Lolagi Visinia |
| RW | 14 | Tomasi Alosio | (substituted off) 57' |
| OC | 13 | Melani Nanai |
| IC | 12 | Henry Taefu |
| LW | 11 | Tuna Tuitama |
| FH | 10 | AJ Alatimu | (substituted off) 52' |
| SH | 9 | Melani Matavao | (substituted off) 52' |
| N8 | 8 | Iakopo Mapu |
| OF | 7 | Theo McFarland (c) | (substituted off) 47' |
| BF | 6 | Taleni Seu |
| RL | 5 | Sam Slade | (substituted off) 65' |
| LL | 4 | Ben Nee-Nee |
| TP | 3 | Michael Alaalatoa | (substituted off) 68' |
| HK | 2 | Pita Anae Ah-Sue | (substituted off) 56' |
| LP | 1 | Aki Seiuli | (substituted off) 56' |
Substitutions:
| HK | 16 | Luteru Tolai | (substituted on) 56' |
| PR | 17 | Jarred Adams | (substituted on) 56' |
| PR | 18 | Brad Amituanai | (substituted on) 68' |
| LK | 19 | Michael Curry | (substituted on) 65' |
| FL | 20 | Olajuwon Noa | (substituted on) 47' |
| FL | 21 | Joel Lam | (substituted on) 52' |
| FH | 22 | Rodney Iona | (substituted on) 52' |
| WG | 23 | Elisapeta Alofipo | (substituted on) 57' |
Coach:
Tusi Pisi

Assistant referees:
Jordan Way (Australia)
Michael Winter (New Zealand)
Television match official:
James Leckie (Australia)

Notes:

- Solomone Tukuafu (Tonga), Joel Lam, Brad Amituanai, and Jarred Adams (all Samoa) made their international debuts.
- This was Tonga's first win over Samoa since their 28–18 win in 2018.

30 August 2025
15:00 FJT (UTC+12)

| (1 BP) Fiji | 32–10 | Tonga |
| Try: Tamanivalu 13' c Ravouvou 21' c Ikanivere 63' c Rakuro 68' m Con: Muntz (3/4) 14', 22', 64'; Pen: Muntz (2/2) 7', 56' | Report | Try: Pulu 2' c Con: Pellegrini (1/1) 3'; Pen: Pellegrini (1/1) 40+1' |

HFC Bank Stadium, Suva
Attendance: 3,000
Referee: Karl Dickson (England)

| FB | 15 | Isaiah Armstrong-Ravula |
| RW | 14 | Kalaveti Ravouvou |
| OC | 13 | Tuidraki Samusamuvodre | (substituted off) 67' |
| IC | 12 | Seta Tamanivalu | (substituted off) 68' |
| LW | 11 | Ponepati Loganimasi |
| FH | 10 | Caleb Muntz |
| SH | 9 | Philip Baselala | (substituted off) 67' |
| N8 | 8 | Viliame Mata | (substituted off) 59' |
| BF | 7 | Elia Canakaivata | (substituted off) 50' | (substituted on) 59' |
| OF | 6 | Etonia Waqa |
| RL | 5 | Temo Mayanavanua | (substituted off) 64' |
| LL | 4 | Isoa Nasilasila |
| TP | 3 | Mesake Doge | (substituted off) 51' |
| HK | 2 | Tevita Ikanivere (c) | (substituted off) 67' |
| LP | 1 | Eroni Mawi | (substituted off) 51' |
Substitutions:
| HK | 16 | Zuriel Togiatama | (substituted on) 67' |
| PR | 17 | Haereiti Hetet | (substituted on) 51' |
| PR | 18 | Samu Tawake | (substituted on) 51' |
| LK | 19 | Mesake Vocevoce | (substituted on) 64' |
| FL | 20 | Motikai Murray | (substituted on) 50' |
| SH | 21 | Sam Wye | (substituted on) 67' |
| FB | 22 | Kemu Valetini | (substituted on) 68' |
| WG | 23 | Taniela Rakuro | (substituted on) 67' |
Coach:
Mick Byrne

| FB | 15 | Salesi Piutau (c) |
| RW | 14 | Fine Inisi |
| OC | 13 | Solomone Kata |
| IC | 12 | Fetuli Paea | | (substituted off) 50' |
| LW | 11 | John Tapueluelu |
| FH | 10 | Patrick Pellegrini |
| SH | 9 | Augustine Pulu | | (substituted off) 56' |
| N8 | 8 | Siosiua Moala | (yellow card) 10' (red card) 68' |
| BF | 7 | Fotu Lokotui | | (substituted off) 64' |
| OF | 6 | Tupou Afungia |
| RL | 5 | Harison Mataele | | (substituted off) 50' |
| LL | 4 | Tanginoa Halaifonua |
| TP | 3 | Solomone Tukuafu | | (substituted off) 28' | (substituted on) 39' | (substituted off) 52' |
| HK | 2 | Sam Moli | | (substituted off) 41' |
| LP | 1 | Siegfried Fisiʻihoi | | (substituted off) 69' |
Substitutions:
| HK | 16 | Siua Maile | | (substituted on) 41' |
| PR | 17 | Feao Fotuaika | | (substituted on) 28' | (substituted off) 39' | (substituted on) 52' |
| PR | 18 | Salesi Tuifua | | (substituted on) 69' |
| LK | 19 | Justin Mataele | | (substituted on) 50' |
| FL | 20 | Talimoni Finau | | (substituted on) 64' |
| SH | 21 | Sonatane Takulua | | (substituted on) 56' |
| FB | 22 | Josiah Unga | | (substituted on) 65' | (substituted off) 78' |
| CE | 23 | Willis Halaholo | | (substituted on) 50' | (substituted off) 65' |
Coach:
Tevita Tuʻifua

Assistant referees:
Takehito Namekawa (Japan)
Katsuki Furuse (Japan)
Television match official:
Brett Cronan (Australia)

Notes:

- Motikai Murray, Taniela Rakuro, Tuidraki Samusamuvodre and Etonia Waqa (all Fiji), Talimoni Finau, Willis Halaholo (all Tonga) made their international debut.

6 September 2025
15:00 NZST (UTC+12)

| Samoa | 15–29 | Fiji (1 BP) |
| Try: Ah-Sue 4' m Lam 19' c Con: Iona (1/2) 20'; Pen: Iona (1/1) 10' | Report | Try: Ikanivere 14' m Tamanivalu 37' c Kuruvoli 60' c Ravouvou 80' c Con: Muntz (2/3) 38', 61'; Valetini (1/1) 80+1'; Pen: Muntz (1/1) 65' |

Rotorua International Stadium, Rotorua (New Zealand)
Attendance: 7,000
Referee: Takehito Namekawa (Japan)

| FB | 15 | Lolagi Visinia |
| RW | 14 | Elisapeta Alofipo | | (substituted off) 80' |
| OC | 13 | Melani Nanai |
| IC | 12 | Henry Taefu |
| LW | 11 | Tuna Tuitama |
| FH | 10 | Rodney Iona | | (substituted off) 65' |
| SH | 9 | Joel Lam | | (substituted off) 58' |
| N8 | 8 | Iakopo Mapu |
| OF | 7 | Alamanda Motuga | | (substituted off) 58' |
| BF | 6 | Taleni Seu | (yellow card) 51' (red card) 80' |
| RL | 5 | Michael Curry | | (substituted off) 61' | (substituted on) 66' |
| LL | 4 | Ben Nee-Nee |
| TP | 3 | Michael Alaalatoa (c) | | (substituted off) 73' |
| HK | 2 | Pita Anae Ah-Sue | | (substituted off) 46' |
| LP | 1 | Aki Seiuli | | (substituted off) 53' |
Substitutions:
| HK | 16 | Luteru Tolai | | (substituted on) 46' |
| PR | 17 | Jarred Adams | | (substituted on) 53' |
| PR | 18 | Brad Amituanai | | (substituted on) 73' |
| FL | 19 | Olajuwon Noa | | (substituted on) 61' | (substituted off) 66' |
| FL | 20 | Malaesaili Elato | | (substituted on) 69' |
| SH | 21 | Connor Tupai | | (substituted on) 58' |
| FH | 22 | AJ Alatimu | | (substituted on) 65' |
| FB | 23 | Tomasi Alosio | | (substituted on) 80' |
Coach:
Tusi Pisi

| FB | 15 | Isaiah Armstrong-Ravula |
| RW | 14 | Kalaveti Ravouvou |
| OC | 13 | Tuidraki Samusamuvodre | (substituted off) 69' |
| IC | 12 | Seta Tamanivalu | (substituted off) 50' |
| LW | 11 | Ponepati Loganimasi |
| FH | 10 | Caleb Muntz |
| SH | 9 | Simione Kuruvoli | (substituted off) 73' |
| N8 | 8 | Elia Canakaivata |
| BF | 7 | Kitione Salawa Jr. | (substituted off) 64' |
| OF | 6 | Etonia Waqa |
| RL | 5 | Temo Mayanavanua | (substituted off) 65' |
| LL | 4 | Isoa Nasilasila |
| TP | 3 | Samu Tawake | (substituted off) 48' |
| HK | 2 | Tevita Ikanivere (c) | (substituted off) 63' |
| LP | 1 | Haereiti Hetet | (substituted off) 73' |
Substitutions:
| HK | 16 | Zuriel Togiatama | (substituted on) 63' |
| PR | 17 | Meli Tuni | (substituted on) 73' |
| PR | 18 | Mesake Doge | (substituted on) 48' |
| LK | 19 | Mesake Vocevoce | (substituted on) 65' |
| FL | 20 | Motikai Murray | (substituted on) 64' |
| SH | 21 | Philip Baselala | (substituted on) 73' |
| FB | 22 | Kemu Valetini | (substituted on) 50' |
| WG | 23 | Taniela Rakuro | (substituted on) 69' |
Coach:
Mick Byrne

Assistant referees:
Angus Mabey (New Zealand)
Katsuki Furuse (Japan)
Television match official:
Richard Kelly (New Zealand)

Notes:

- Malaesaili Elato (Samoa) made his international debut.

=== Pool B ===
| Pos | Team | Pld | W | D | L | PF | PA | PD | TF | TA | TB | LB | Pts | Qualification |
|---|---|---|---|---|---|---|---|---|---|---|---|---|---|---|
| 1 | Japan | 2 | 2 | 0 | 0 | 104 | 36 | +68 | 15 | 5 | 2 | 0 | 10 | Advance to Semi-finals |
| 2 | Canada | 2 | 1 | 0 | 1 | 49 | 77 | −28 | 7 | 10 | 1 | 0 | 5 | Advance to Semi-finals |
| 3 | United States | 2 | 0 | 0 | 2 | 41 | 81 | −40 | 5 | 12 | 0 | 0 | 0 | |

Source: World Rugby

22 August 2025
19:00 MDT (UTC–6)

| (1 BP) Canada | 34–20 | United States |
| Try: Ardron (4) 3' c, 21' m, 37' m, 57' c Nelson 61' c Con: Nelson (3/5) 4', 57', 62'; Pen: Nelson (1/1) 45' | Report | Try: Besag 9' c McLean 17' c Con: MacGinty (2/2) 10', 18'; Pen: MacGinty (2/2) 35', 42' |

McMahon Stadium, Calgary
Attendance: 11,587
Referee: Luke Pearce (England)

| FB | 15 | Peter Nelson |
| RW | 14 | Isaac Olson | (substituted off) 55' |
| OC | 13 | Noah Flesch | (substituted off) 80' |
| IC | 12 | Ben LeSage |
| LW | 11 | Josiah Morra |
| FH | 10 | Cooper Coats |
| SH | 9 | Jason Higgins | (substituted off) 80' |
| N8 | 8 | Tyler Ardron |
| BF | 7 | Lucas Rumball (c) |
| OF | 6 | Matthew Oworu | (substituted off) 59' |
| RL | 5 | Evan Olmstead |
| LL | 4 | Piers Von Dadelszen | (substituted off) 80' |
| TP | 3 | Cole Keith | (substituted off) 80' |
| HK | 2 | Dewald Kotze | (substituted off) 78' |
| LP | 1 | Cali Martinez | (substituted off) 80' |
Substitutions:
| HK | 16 | Jesse Mackail | (substituted on) 78' |
| PR | 17 | Emerson Prior | (substituted on) 80' |
| PR | 18 | Kyle Steeves | (substituted on) 80' |
| FL | 19 | Mason Flesch | (substituted on) 59' |
| FL | 20 | Siôn Parry | (substituted on) 80' |
| SH | 21 | Stephen Webb | (substituted on) 80' |
| CE | 22 | Spencer Jones | (substituted on) 80' |
| WG | 23 | Nic Benn | (substituted on) 55' |
Coach:
Steve Meehan

| FB | 15 | Erich Storti | | (substituted off) 68' |
| RW | 14 | Rufus McLean | | (substituted off) 75' |
| OC | 13 | Dominic Besag |
| IC | 12 | Tavite Lopeti |
| LW | 11 | Lauina Futi |
| FH | 10 | AJ MacGinty | (yellow card) 65' |
| SH | 9 | Juan-Philip Smith | | (substituted off) 74' |
| N8 | 8 | Makeen Alikhan | | (substituted off) 72' |
| OF | 7 | Cory Daniel | | (substituted off) 36' |
| BF | 6 | Benjamín Bonasso (c) | | (substituted off) 51' |
| RL | 5 | Jason Damm |
| LL | 4 | Marno Redelinghuys |
| TP | 3 | Tonga Kofe | | (substituted off) 40' |
| HK | 2 | Kapeli Pifeleti | | (substituted off) 51' |
| LP | 1 | Jack Iscaro | | (substituted off) 51' |
Substitutions:
| HK | 16 | Kaleb Geiger | | (substituted on) 51' |
| PR | 17 | Ezekiel Lindenmuth | | (substituted on) 51' |
| PR | 18 | Pono Davis | | (substituted on) 40' |
| LK | 19 | Tevita Naqali | | (substituted on) 72' |
| FL | 20 | Vili Helu | | (substituted on) 51' |
| FL | 21 | Christian Poidevin | | (substituted on) 36' |
| SH | 22 | Ethan McVeigh | | (substituted on) 74' |
| FH | 23 | Tom Pittman | | (substituted on) 68' |
Coach:
Scott Lawrence

Player of the Match:
Tyler Ardron (Canada)

Assistant referees:
Adam Leal (England)
Anthony Woodthorpe (England)
Television match official:
Eric Gauzins (France)

Notes:

- Stephen Webb (Canada) made his international debut.
- This was Canada's first win in the Pacific Nations Cup since their 36–27 win over Tonga in 2013.
- This was Canada's first win over the United States since their 34–21 win in 2021.

30 August 2025
17:00 JST (UTC+9)

| (1 BP) Japan | 57–15 | Canada |
| Try: Fakatava (2) 3' c, 55' c Dearns 38' c Greene 59' m Gunter 65' c Osada 73' c Ishida (2) 77' c, 80+4' c Con: Lee (7/8) 49', 4', 56', 66', 75', 78', 80+5'; Pen: Lee (1/1) 13' | Report | Try: Parry 22' c Mackail 79' m Con: Nelson (1/2) 22'; Pen: Nelson (1/1) 29' |

Yurtec Stadium, Sendai
Attendance: 11,187
Referee: Paul Williams (New Zealand)

| FB | 15 | Sam Greene |
| RW | 14 | Kippei Ishida |
| OC | 13 | Dylan Riley | | (substituted off) 70' |
| IC | 12 | Charlie Lawrence |
| LW | 11 | Malo Tuitama | | (substituted off) 46' |
| FH | 10 | Lee Seung-sin |
| SH | 9 | Shinobu Fujiwara | | (substituted off) 49' |
| N8 | 8 | Amato Fakatava | | (substituted off) 63' |
| OF | 7 | Kanji Shimokawa | | (substituted off) 66' |
| BF | 6 | Ben Gunter |
| RL | 5 | Warner Dearns (c) |
| LL | 4 | Waisake Raratubua | (yellow card) 31' |
| TP | 3 | Shuhei Takeuchi | | (substituted off) 53' |
| HK | 2 | Hayate Era | | (substituted off) 66' |
| LP | 1 | Sena Kimura | | (substituted off) 52' |
Substitutions:
| HK | 16 | Kenji Sato | | (substituted on) 66' |
| PR | 17 | Kenta Kobayashi | | (substituted on) 52' |
| PR | 18 | Keijiro Tamefusa | | (substituted on) 53' |
| FL | 19 | Tiennan Costley | | (substituted on) 66' |
| FL | 20 | Faulua Makisi | | (substituted on) 63' |
| SH | 21 | Kenta Fukuda | | (substituted on) 49' |
| CE | 22 | Yuya Hirose | | (substituted on) 70' |
| CE | 23 | Tomoki Osada | | (substituted on) 46' |
Coach:
Eddie Jones

| FB | 15 | Shane O'Leary |
| RW | 14 | Josiah Morra |
| OC | 13 | Ben LeSage |
| IC | 12 | Spencer Jones | (substituted off) 61' |
| LW | 11 | Nic Benn | (substituted off) 73' |
| FH | 10 | Peter Nelson |
| SH | 9 | Jason Higgins | (substituted off) 75' |
| N8 | 8 | Matthew Oworu | (substituted off) 56' | (substituted on) 73' |
| BF | 7 | Lucas Rumball (c) | | (substituted off) 73' |
| OF | 6 | Siôn Parry |
| RL | 5 | Mason Flesch | (substituted off) 66' |
| LL | 4 | Piers Von Dadelszen |
| TP | 3 | Cole Keith | (substituted off) 57' |
| HK | 2 | Dewald Kotze | (substituted off) 68' |
| LP | 1 | Cali Martinez | (substituted off) 67' |
Substitutions:
| HK | 16 | Jesse Mackail | (substituted on) 68' |
| PR | 17 | Emerson Prior | (substituted on) 67' |
| PR | 18 | Conor Young | (substituted on) 57' |
| LK | 19 | Callum Botchar | (substituted on) 66' |
| FL | 20 | Matt Heaton | (substituted on) 56' |
| SH | 21 | Stephen Webb | (substituted on) 75' |
| CE | 22 | Noah Flesch | (substituted on) 61' |
| FH | 23 | Brenden Black | (substituted on) 73' |
Coach:
Steve Meehan

Assistant referees:
Jordan Way (Australia)
Damon Murphy (Australia)
Television match official:
Glenn Newman (New Zealand)

Notes:

- Charlie Lawrence, Kenta Kobayashi, Kenji Sato, Yūya Hirose (all Japan) made their international debut.
- Japan's 57 points was the most they had scored against Canada. It was also Japan's biggest-ever victory against Canada (by margin), surpassing the 38-point margin they achieved in 2001.

6 September 2025
18:00 PDT (UTC–7)

| United States | 21–47 | Japan (1 BP) |
| Try: Pifeleti (2) 30' c, 38' c Talea 79' c Con: Hilsenbeck (2/2) 31', 39'; Carty (1/1) 79' | Report | Try: Gunter 12' c Fakatava (2) 22' c, 44' m Dearns (2) 26' c, 62'; Shimokawa 33' c Ishida 70'; Con: Lee (6/7) 13', 23', 27', 34', 63', 71' |

Heart Health Park, Sacramento
Attendance: 6,079
Referee: Craig Evans (Wales)

| FB | 15 | Erich Storti |
| RW | 14 | Rufus McLean | | (substituted off) 40' |
| OC | 13 | Dominic Besag |
| IC | 12 | Tavite Lopeti |
| LW | 11 | Toby Fricker |
| FH | 10 | Christopher Hilsenbeck | | (substituted off) 51' |
| SH | 9 | Ruben de Haas | | (substituted off) 67' |
| N8 | 8 | Makeen Alikhan | | (substituted off) 14' |
| OF | 7 | Christian Poidevin | (yellow card) 67' |
| BF | 6 | Paddy Ryan |
| RL | 5 | Jason Damm (c) |
| LL | 4 | Marno Redelinghuys | | (substituted off) 35' | (substituted on) 40' | (substituted off) 68' |
| TP | 3 | Kaleb Geiger | | (substituted off) 45' |
| HK | 2 | Kapeli Pifeleti | | (substituted off) 55' |
| LP | 1 | Ezekiel Lindenmuth | | (substituted off) 45' |
Substitutions:
| HK | 16 | Shilo Klein | | (substituted on) 55' |
| PR | 17 | Payton Talea | | (substituted on) 45' |
| PR | 18 | Pono Davis | | (substituted on) 45' |
| LK | 19 | Tevita Naqali | | (substituted on) 35' | (substituted off) 40' | (substituted on) 68' |
| FL | 20 | Vili Helu | | (substituted on) 14' |
| SH | 21 | Ethan McVeigh | | (substituted on) 67' |
| FH | 22 | Luke Carty | | (substituted on) 51' |
| FB | 23 | Mitch Wilson | | (substituted on) 40' |
Coach:
Scott Lawrence

| FB | 15 | Sam Greene |
| RW | 14 | Kippei Ishida |
| OC | 13 | Dylan Riley |
| IC | 12 | Charlie Lawrence | (substituted off) 55' |
| LW | 11 | Tomoki Osada | (substituted off) 67' |
| FH | 10 | Lee Seung-sin |
| SH | 9 | Kenta Fukuda | (substituted off) 40' |
| N8 | 8 | Amato Fakatava | (substituted off) 55' |
| OF | 7 | Kanji Shimokawa | (substituted off) 67' |
| BF | 6 | Ben Gunter |
| RL | 5 | Warner Dearns (c) |
| LL | 4 | Waisake Raratubua |
| TP | 3 | Shuhei Takeuchi | (substituted off) 55' |
| HK | 2 | Hayate Era | (substituted off) 63' |
| LP | 1 | Kenta Kobayashi | (substituted off) 55' |
Substitutions:
| HK | 16 | Kenji Sato | (substituted on) 63' |
| PR | 17 | Sena Kimura | (substituted on) 55' |
| PR | 18 | Keijiro Tamefusa | (substituted on) 55' |
| FL | 19 | Akito Okui | (substituted on) 67' |
| FL | 20 | Faulua Makisi | (substituted on) 55' |
| SH | 21 | Shinobu Fujiwara | (substituted on) 40' |
| CE | 22 | Yuya Hirose | (substituted on) 55' |
| WG | 23 | Haruto Kida | (substituted on) 67' |
Coach:
Eddie Jones

Assistant referees:
Damian Schneider (Argentina)
Robin Kaluzniak (Canada)
Television match official:
Tual Trainini (France)

Notes:

- Haruto Kida and Akito Okui (both Japan) made their international debuts.

== Finals series ==
=== Bracket ===
Semi-finals
14 September – Denver
Fiji | 63
Canada | 10
14 September – Denver
Japan | 62
Tonga | 24

Grand Final
20 September – Salt Lake City
Fiji | 33
Japan | 27
Bronze Final
20 September – Salt Lake City
Canada | 24
Tonga | 35

=== Fifth-place play-off ===
14 September 2025
12:35 MDT (UTC−6)

| Samoa | 13–29 | United States |
| Try: Nanai 61' c Con: Leali'ifano (1/1) 62'; Pen: Iona (2/4) 4', 33' | Report | Try: Fricker 22' m Carty 66' c Damm 73' c Geiger 76' c Con: Wilson (3/3) 68', 74', 77'; Pen: Carty (1/3) 36' |

Dick's Sporting Goods Park, Commerce City
Attendance: 6,452 (Note: This fixture was sold under a single ticket across both semi-finals and Fifth-place play-off.)
Referee: Damian Schneider (Argentina)

| FB | 15 | Lolagi Visinia |
| RW | 14 | Elisapeta Alofipo |
| OC | 13 | Melani Nanai |
| IC | 12 | Henry Taefu |
| LW | 11 | Tuna Tuitama | (yellow card) 79' |
| FH | 10 | Rodney Iona | | (substituted off) 48' |
| SH | 9 | Connor Tupai |
| N8 | 8 | Iakopo Mapu | | (substituted off) 60' |
| OF | 7 | Alamanda Motuga |
| BF | 6 | Olajuwon Noa |
| RL | 5 | Michael Curry | | (substituted off) 55' |
| LL | 4 | Ben Nee-Nee |
| TP | 3 | Michael Alaalatoa (c) | | (substituted off) 74' |
| HK | 2 | Luteru Tolai | | (substituted off) 60' |
| LP | 1 | Aki Seiuli | | (substituted off) 55' |
Substitutions:
| HK | 16 | Ray Niuia | | (substituted on) 60' |
| PR | 17 | Jarred Adams | | (substituted on) 55' |
| PR | 18 | Marco Fepulea'i | | (substituted on) 74' |
| FL | 19 | Potu Leavasa Jr. | | (substituted on) 55' |
| FL | 20 | Abraham Papali'i | | (substituted on) 60' |
| SH | 21 | Melani Matavao | | (substituted on) 60' |
| FH | 22 | Christian Leali'ifano | | (substituted on) 48' |
| FB | 23 | Tomasi Alosio |
Coach:
Tusi Pisi

| FB | 15 | Mitch Wilson |
| RW | 14 | Rufus McLean |
| OC | 13 | Dominic Besag |
| IC | 12 | Tommaso Boni |
| LW | 11 | Toby Fricker | | (substituted off) 43' | (substituted on) 48' | (substituted off) 77' |
| FH | 10 | Christopher Hilsenbeck | | (substituted off) 15' |
| SH | 9 | Ruben de Haas |
| N8 | 8 | Paddy Ryan | | (substituted off) 74' |
| OF | 7 | Cory Daniel |
| BF | 6 | Vili Helu | | (substituted off) 77' |
| RL | 5 | Jason Damm (c) |
| LL | 4 | Marno Redelinghuys |
| TP | 3 | Pono Davis | (yellow card) 37' |
| HK | 2 | Kapeli Pifeleti | | (substituted off) 68' |
| LP | 1 | Jack Iscaro | | (substituted off) 63' |
Substitutions:
| HK | 16 | Kaleb Geiger | | (substituted on) 68' |
| PR | 17 | Ezekiel Lindenmuth | | (substituted on) 63' |
| PR | 18 | Maliu Niuafe | | (substituted on) 43' | (substituted off) 48' |
| LK | 19 | Tevita Naqali | | (substituted on) 77' |
| FL | 20 | Christian Poidevin | | (substituted on) 74' |
| SH | 21 | Ethan McVeigh |
| FH | 22 | Luke Carty | | (substituted on) 15' |
| CE | 23 | Erich Storti | | | | (substituted on) 77' |
Coach:
Scott Lawrence

Assistant referees:
Andrew Brace (Ireland)
Craig Evans (Wales)
Television match official:
Marius van der Westhuizen (South Africa)
Foul play review officer:
Tual Trainini (France)

Notes:

- Potu Leavasa Jr. and Abraham Papali'i (both Samoa) and Maliu Niuafe (United States) made their international debuts.
- This was the United States biggest winning margin over Samoa (16 points) surpassing the 3-point difference set in 2019.

=== Semi-finals ===
14 September 2025
15:35 MDT (UTC−6)

| Japan | 62–24 | Tonga |
| Try: Era 10' c Fakatava 18' c Dearns 32' c Riley 42' c Fujiwara 55' c Sato 72' c Tamefusa 77' c Penalty try 79'; Con: Lee (7/7) 11', 19', 34', 43', 56', 73', 78'; Pen: Lee (2/2) 49', 58' | Report | Try: Lokotui 6' m Tameifuna 26' c Poloniati 38' c Tapueluelu 63' m Con: Pellegrini (2/4) 50', 59' |

Dick's Sporting Goods Park, Commerce City
Attendance: 6,452
Referee: Luc Ramos (France)

| FB | 15 | Sam Greene |
| RW | 14 | Kippei Ishida |
| OC | 13 | Dylan Riley |
| IC | 12 | Charlie Lawrence | (substituted off) 56' |
| LW | 11 | Tomoki Osada |
| FH | 10 | Lee Seung-sin |
| SH | 9 | Shinobu Fujiwara | (substituted off) 73' |
| N8 | 8 | Amato Fakatava | (substituted off) 56' |
| OF | 7 | Kanji Shimokawa | (substituted off) 67' |
| BF | 6 | Ben Gunter |
| RL | 5 | Warner Dearns (c) |
| LL | 4 | Jack Cornelsen | (substituted off) 64' |
| TP | 3 | Shuhei Takeuchi | (substituted off) 61' |
| HK | 2 | Hayate Era | (substituted off) 59' |
| LP | 1 | Sena Kimura | (substituted off) 50' |
Substitutions:
| HK | 16 | Kenji Sato | (substituted on) 59' |
| PR | 17 | Kenta Kobayashi | (substituted on) 50' |
| PR | 18 | Keijiro Tamefusa | (substituted on) 61' |
| LK | 19 | Waisake Raratubua | (substituted on) 64' |
| FL | 20 | Tiennan Costley | (substituted on) 67' |
| FL | 21 | Faulua Makisi | (substituted on) 56' |
| SH | 22 | Kenta Fukuda | (substituted on) 73' |
| CE | 23 | Yuya Hirose | (substituted on) 56' |
Coach:
Eddie Jones

| FB | 15 | Charles Piutau |
| RW | 14 | Nikolai Foliaki | | (substituted off) 72' |
| OC | 13 | Fetuli Paea |
| IC | 12 | Willis Halaholo | | (substituted off) 48' |
| LW | 11 | John Tapueluelu |
| FH | 10 | Patrick Pellegrini |
| SH | 9 | Sonatane Takulua | | (substituted off) 74' |
| N8 | 8 | Siosiua Moala |
| BF | 7 | Fotu Lokotui | | | | (substituted off) 57' |
| OF | 6 | Tupou Afungia | (yellow card) 55' |
| RL | 5 | Harison Mataele | | (substituted off) 25' | (substituted on) 39' |
| LL | 4 | Veikoso Poloniati | | (substituted off) 72' | (substituted on) 77' |
| TP | 3 | Ben Tameifuna (c) | | (substituted off) 47' |
| HK | 2 | Sam Moli | | (substituted off) 59' |
| LP | 1 | Siegfried Fisiʻihoi | | (substituted off) 74' |
Substitutions:
| HK | 16 | Sosefo Sakalia | | (substituted on) 74' |
| PR | 17 | Tau Koloamatangi | | (substituted on) 59' |
| PR | 18 | Solomone Tukuafu | | (substituted on) 47' |
| LK | 19 | Justin Mataele | | (substituted on) 72' | (substituted off) 77' |
| FL | 20 | Tevita Ahokovi | | (substituted on) 25' | (substituted off) 39' | (substituted on) 57' |
| SH | 21 | Siaosi Nai | (yellow card) 79' | (substituted on) 74' |
| FH | 22 | James Faiva | | (substituted on) 72' |
| FB | 23 | Josiah Unga | | (substituted on) 48' |
Coach:
Tevita Tuʻifua

Player of the Match:
Shuhei Takeuchi (Japan)

Assistant referees:
Andrew Brace (Ireland)
Robin Kaluzniak (Canada)
Television match official:
Tual Trainini (France)
Foul play review officer:
Marius van der Westhuizen (South Africa)

Notes:

- Japan achieved their largest victory against Tonga in this match, surpassing their previous high of 34 points (41–7) set in 2019.

14 September 2025
18:35 MDT (UTC−6)

| Fiji | 63–10 | Canada |
| Try: Rakuro (2) 4' c, 40' m Vocevoce 9' c Waqa 15' c Ravouvou (3) 29' c, 57' c, 66' m Mawi 33' c Nasova 41' m Con: Valetini (6/9) 5', 10', 16', 30', 34', 58'; Pen: Valetini (2/2) 22', 53' | Report | Try: Gallagher 59' c Con: Nelson (1/1) 60'; Pen: Nelson (1/1) 7' |

Dick's Sporting Goods Park, Commerce City
Attendance: 6,452
Referee: Eoghan Cross (Ireland)

| FB | 15 | Ponepati Loganimasi | | (substituted off) 77' |
| RW | 14 | Kalaveti Ravouvou |
| OC | 13 | Seta Tamanivalu | | (substituted off) 3' |
| IC | 12 | Inia Tabuavou |
| LW | 11 | Taniela Rakuro |
| FH | 10 | Kemu Valetini |
| SH | 9 | Simione Kuruvoli | | (substituted off) 56' |
| N8 | 8 | Viliame Mata | | (substituted off) 40' |
| BF | 7 | Elia Canakaivata | | (substituted off) 64' |
| OF | 6 | Etonia Waqa | (yellow card) 43' |
| RL | 5 | Isoa Nasilasila | | (substituted off) 67' |
| LL | 4 | Mesake Vocevoce |
| TP | 3 | Mesake Doge | (red card) 35' |
| HK | 2 | Tevita Ikanivere (c) | | (substituted off) 60' |
| LP | 1 | Eroni Mawi | | (substituted off) 64' |
Substitutions:
| HK | 16 | Zuriel Togiatama | | (substituted on) 60' |
| PR | 17 | Haereiti Hetet | | (substituted on) 64' |
| PR | 18 | Samu Tawake | | (substituted on) 40' |
| LK | 19 | Temo Mayanavanua | | (substituted on) 67' |
| FL | 20 | Motikai Murray | | (substituted on) 64' |
| SH | 21 | Sam Wye | | (substituted on) 58' |
| FB | 22 | Caleb Muntz |
| WG | 23 | Joji Nasova | | (substituted on) 3' |
Coach:
Mick Byrne

| FB | 15 | Shane O'Leary |
| RW | 14 | Nic Benn | | | (substituted off) 75' |
| OC | 13 | Noah Flesch |
| IC | 12 | Spencer Jones |
| LW | 11 | Josiah Morra |
| FH | 10 | Peter Nelson | (substituted off) 14' | (substituted on) 29' |
| SH | 9 | Jason Higgins | (substituted off) 58' |
| N8 | 8 | Matthew Oworu |
| BF | 7 | Siôn Parry | (substituted off) 58' |
| OF | 6 | Mason Flesch (c) |
| RL | 5 | Callum Botchar | (substituted off) 51' |
| LL | 4 | Piers Von Dadelszen | (substituted off) 61' |
| TP | 3 | Cole Keith | (substituted off) 58' |
| HK | 2 | Dewald Kotze | (substituted off) 58' |
| LP | 1 | Cali Martinez | (substituted off) 58' |
Substitutions:
| HK | 16 | Jesse Mackail | (substituted on) 58' |
| PR | 17 | Emerson Prior | (substituted on) 58' |
| PR | 18 | Conor Young | (substituted on) 58' |
| LK | 19 | Izzak Kelly | (substituted on) 51' |
| FL | 20 | Matt Heaton | (substituted on) 58' |
| SH | 21 | Brock Gallagher | (substituted on) 58' |
| CE | 22 | Talon McMullin | (substituted on) 61' |
| WG | 23 | Kainoa Lloyd | (substituted on) 14' | (substituted off) 29' | (substituted on) 75' |
Coach:
Steve Meehan

Player of the Match:
Kalaveti Ravouvou (Fiji)

Assistant referees:
Craig Evans (Wales)
Lex Weiner (United States)
Television match official:
Tual Trainini (France)
Foul play review officer:
Marius van der Westhuizen (South Africa)

Notes:

- Joji Nasova (Fiji) made his international debut.
- This match was Fiji's largest victory against Canada and surpassed their previous best of 40 points (17–57) set in 2017.

=== Bronze Final ===
20 September 2025
16:35 MDT (UTC−6)

| Tonga | 35–24 | Canada |
| Try: Afungia 11' c Pellegrini (3) 34' c, 62' c, 71' c Fisiʻihoi 57' c Con: Pellegrini (5/5) 12', 35', 58', 63', 72' | Report | Try: Oworu 39' c Gallagher 45' c Nelson 68' c Con: Nelson (3/3) 39', 46', 68'; Pen: Nelson (1/1) 60' |

America First Field, Salt Lake City
Attendance: 8,000 (Note: This fixture was sold under a single ticket across both the Bronze and Grand Final.)
Referee: Eoghan Cross (Ireland)

| FB | 15 | Josiah Unga | | (substituted off) 72' |
| RW | 14 | Nikolai Foliaki | (yellow card) 68' |
| OC | 13 | Charles Piutau |
| IC | 12 | Fetuli Paea |
| LW | 11 | John Tapueluelu |
| FH | 10 | Patrick Pellegrini | | (substituted off) 73' |
| SH | 9 | Sonatane Takulua | | (substituted off) 79' |
| N8 | 8 | Siosiua Moala |
| BF | 7 | Tupou Afungia |
| OF | 6 | Tevita Ahokovi |
| RL | 5 | Harison Mataele | | (substituted off) 69' |
| LL | 4 | Veikoso Poloniati | | (substituted off) 77' |
| TP | 3 | Ben Tameifuna (c) | | (substituted off) 52' | (substituted on) 72' |
| HK | 2 | Sam Moli | | (substituted off) 69' |
| LP | 1 | Siegfried Fisiʻihoi |
Substitutions:
| HK | 16 | Sosefo Sakalia | | (substituted on) 69' |
| PR | 17 | Leopino Maupese |
| PR | 18 | Tau Koloamatangi | | (substituted on) 52' | (substituted off) 72' |
| LK | 19 | Talimoni Finau | | (substituted on) 69' |
| FL | 20 | Sam Tuitupou | | (substituted on) 77' |
| SH | 21 | Siaosi Nai | | (substituted on) 79' |
| CE | 22 | Willis Halaholo | | (substituted on) 72' |
| FH | 23 | James Faiva | | (substituted on) 73' |
Coach:
Tevita Tuʻifua

| FB | 15 | Nic Benn | | (substituted off) 75' |
| RW | 14 | Jack Shaw |
| OC | 13 | Spencer Jones | | (substituted off) 75' |
| IC | 12 | Talon McMullin |
| LW | 11 | Josiah Morra |
| FH | 10 | Peter Nelson |
| SH | 9 | Brock Gallagher | | (substituted off) 56' |
| N8 | 8 | Matthew Oworu |
| BF | 7 | Siôn Parry | | (substituted off) 68' |
| OF | 6 | Mason Flesch (c) |
| RL | 5 | Izzak Kelly | | (substituted off) 61' |
| LL | 4 | Piers Von Dadelszen |
| TP | 3 | Cole Keith | | (substituted off) 61' | (substituted on) 70' |
| HK | 2 | Dewald Kotze | | (substituted off) 79' |
| LP | 1 | Cali Martinez | | (substituted off) 61' |
Substitutions:
| HK | 16 | Austin Creighton | | (substituted on) 79' |
| PR | 17 | Emerson Prior | | (substituted on) 61' |
| PR | 18 | Kyle Steeves | (yellow card) 69' | (substituted on) 61' |
| LK | 19 | Callum Botchar | | (substituted on) 61' | (substituted off) 70' |
| FL | 20 | Matt Heaton | | (substituted on) 68' |
| SH | 21 | Jason Higgins | | (substituted on) 56' |
| CE | 22 | Noah Flesch | | (substituted on) 75' |
| FH | 23 | Shane O'Leary | | (substituted on) 75' |
Coach:
Steve Meehan

Player of the Match:
Patrick Pellegrini (Tonga)

Assistant referees:
Lex Weiner (United States)
Luke Rogan (United States)
Television match official:
Mike Adamson (Scotland)
Foul play review officer:
Marius van der Westhuizen (South Africa)

Notes:

- Austin Creighton and Jack Shaw (both Canada) made their international debuts.

=== Grand Final ===
20 September 2025
19:35 MDT (UTC−6)

| Japan | 27–33 | Fiji |
| Try: Era (2) 5' c, 60' c Nakakusu 47' c Con: Lee (3/3) 6', 47', 61'; Pen: Lee (2/2) 20', 64' | Report | Try: Vocevoce 21' c Tabuavou 31' m Ikanivere 35' c Nasova (2) 40' c, 43' c Con: Muntz (4/5) 22', 36', 41', 44' |

America First Field, Salt Lake City
Attendance: 8,000
Referee: Damian Schneider (Argentina)

| FB | 15 | Ichigo Nakakusu | (substituted off) 48' |
| RW | 14 | Tomoki Osada |
| OC | 13 | Dylan Riley |
| IC | 12 | Charlie Lawrence | (substituted off) 40' |
| LW | 11 | Haruto Kida | (substituted off) 10' | (substituted on) 20' |
| FH | 10 | Lee Seung-sin |
| SH | 9 | Shinobu Fujiwara | (substituted off) 61' |
| N8 | 8 | Amato Fakatava | (substituted off) 13' | (substituted on) 24' | (substituted off) 77' |
| OF | 7 | Kanji Shimokawa | (substituted off) 65' |
| BF | 6 | Faulua Makisi |
| RL | 5 | Warner Dearns (c) |
| LL | 4 | Jack Cornelsen |
| TP | 3 | Shuhei Takeuchi | (substituted off) 70' |
| HK | 2 | Hayate Era | (substituted off) 70' |
| LP | 1 | Kenta Kobayashi | (substituted off) 77' |
Substitutions:
| HK | 16 | Kenji Sato | (substituted on) 70' |
| PR | 17 | Ryosuke Iwaihara | (substituted on) 77' |
| PR | 18 | Keijiro Tamefusa | (substituted on) 70' |
| FL | 19 | Tiennan Costley | (substituted on) 77' |
| FL | 20 | Akito Okui | (substituted on) 13' | (substituted off) 24' | (substituted on) 65' |
| SH | 21 | Kenta Fukuda | (substituted on) 61' |
| CE | 22 | Shōgo Nakano | (substituted on) 40' |
| CE | 23 | Yuki Ikeda | (substituted on) 10' | (substituted off) 20' | | (substituted on) 48' |
Coach:
Eddie Jones

| FB | 15 | Ponepati Loganimasi |
| RW | 14 | Joji Nasova |
| OC | 13 | Kalaveti Ravouvou |
| IC | 12 | Inia Tabuavou | | (substituted off) 48' |
| LW | 11 | Taniela Rakuro | | (substituted off) 73' |
| FH | 10 | Caleb Muntz |
| SH | 9 | Simione Kuruvoli | | (substituted off) 48' |
| N8 | 8 | Viliame Mata | (yellow card) 53' | (substituted off) 70' |
| BF | 7 | Elia Canakaivata | | (substituted off) 67' |
| OF | 6 | Etonia Waqa |
| RL | 5 | Temo Mayanavanua | | (substituted off) 45' |
| LL | 4 | Mesake Vocevoce |
| TP | 3 | Mesake Doge | | (substituted off) 64' |
| HK | 2 | Tevita Ikanivere (c) | | (substituted off) 65' |
| LP | 1 | Eroni Mawi | (yellow card) 62' | (substituted off) 51' | (substituted on) 57' |
Substitutions:
| HK | 16 | Zuriel Togiatama | | (substituted on) 65' |
| PR | 17 | Haereiti Hetet | | (substituted on) 51' | (substituted off) 57' |
| PR | 18 | Samu Tawake | | (substituted on) 64' |
| LK | 19 | Isoa Nasilasila | | (substituted on) 45' |
| FL | 20 | Kitione Salawa Jr. | | (substituted on) 70' |
| SH | 21 | Sam Wye | | (substituted on) 48' |
| FB | 22 | Kemu Valetini | | (substituted on) 48' |
| FH | 23 | Isaiah Armstrong-Ravula | | (substituted on) 73' |
Coach:
Mick Byrne

Assistant referees:
Luke Pearce (Ireland)
Robin Kaluzniak (Canada)
Television match official:
Marius van der Westhuizen (South Africa)
Foul play review officer:
Mike Adamson (Scotland)

Notes:

- Yuki Ikeda and Ryosuke Iwaihara (both Japan) made their international debuts.

== Final standings ==
| R | Team | Pl | P | W | D | L | PF | PA | Diff. | TF | TA | 2027 Rugby World Cup status | Nations Championship status |
|---|---|---|---|---|---|---|---|---|---|---|---|---|---|
| 1 | Fiji | A | 4 | 4 | 0 | 0 | 157 | 62 | +95 | 22 | 7 | 2023 Rugby World Cup pool stage | Championship |
| 2 | Japan | B | 4 | 3 | 0 | 1 | 193 | 93 | +100 | 26 | 14 | 2023 Rugby World Cup pool stage | Championship |
| 3 | Tonga | A | 4 | 2 | 0 | 2 | 99 | 134 | –35 | 13 | 17 | Qualified as Pacific 1 | Second division |
| 4 | Canada | B | 4 | 1 | 0 | 3 | 83 | 175 | –92 | 11 | 24 | Qualified as Pacific 2 | Second division |
| 5 | United States | B | 3 | 1 | 0 | 2 | 70 | 95 | –25 | 9 | 13 | Qualified as Pacific 3 | Second division |
| 6 | Samoa | A | 3 | 0 | 0 | 3 | 44 | 88 | –44 | 5 | 11 | Advanced to Pacific / Sudamérica qualifying play-off | |

== Statistics ==
As of 20 September 2025.

=== Point scorers ===
Top point-scorers
| Pos. | Player | Tries | Con. | Pen. | Drop. | Points |
|---|---|---|---|---|---|---|
| 1 | Lee Seung-sin | 0 | 23 | 5 | 0 | 61 |
| 2 | Patrick Pellegrini | 3 | 11 | 4 | 0 | 49 |
| 3 | Peter Nelson | 2 | 8 | 4 | 0 | 38 |
| 4 | Caleb Muntz | 0 | 9 | 3 | 0 | 27 |
| 5 | Kalaveti Ravouvou | 5 | 0 | 0 | 0 | 25 |
| 5 | Amato Fakatava | 5 | 0 | 0 | 0 | 25 |
| 7 | Tyler Ardron | 4 | 0 | 0 | 0 | 20 |
| 7 | Kemu Valetini | 0 | 7 | 2 | 0 | 20 |
| 7 | Warner Dearns | 4 | 0 | 0 | 0 | 20 |
| 10 | Tevita Ikanivere | 3 | 0 | 0 | 0 | 15 |
| 10 | Joji Nasova | 3 | 0 | 0 | 0 | 15 |
| 10 | Taniela Rakuro | 3 | 0 | 0 | 0 | 15 |
| 10 | Hayate Era | 3 | 0 | 0 | 0 | 15 |
| 10 | Kippei Ishida | 3 | 0 | 0 | 0 | 15 |

=== Try scorers ===
Top try-scorers
| Pos. | Player | Tries |
|---|---|---|
| 1 | Kalaveti Ravouvou | 5 |
| 1 | Amato Fakatava | 5 |
| 3 | Tyler Ardron | 4 |
| 3 | Warner Dearns | 4 |
| 5 | Tevita Ikanivere | 3 |
| 5 | Joji Nasova | 3 |
| 5 | Taniela Rakuro | 3 |
| 5 | Hayate Era | 3 |
| 5 | Kippei Ishida | 3 |
| 5 | Patrick Pellegrini | 3 |

== Participants ==
Caps and clubs as per the first match of the tournament (22 August 2025).

| Team | Stadium | | | Coach | Captain | World Rugby Ranking | |
| Team | Home stadium | Capacity | Location | Coach | Captain | Start (Note: As of 18 August 2025) | End (Note: As of 22 September 2025) |
|---|---|---|---|---|---|---|---|
| Canada | McMahon Stadium | 35,400 | Calgary, Alberta | Steve Meehan | Lucas Rumball | 25th | 24th |
| Fiji | HFC Bank Stadium | 15,446 | Suva, Rewa Province | Mick Byrne | Tevita Ikanivere | 9th | 9th |
| Japan | Yurtec Stadium | 19,134 | Sendai, Miyagi Prefecture | Eddie Jones | Warner Dearns | 14th | 13th |
| Samoa | Rotorua International Stadium | 26,000 | Rotorua, Bay of Plenty (New Zealand) | Tusi Pisi | Theo McFarland | 13th | 15th |
| Tonga | Teufaiva Sport Stadium | 10,000 | Nukuʻalofa, Tongatapu | Tevita Tuʻifua | Ben Tameifuna | 19th | 17th |
| United States | Heart Health Park | 11,569 | Sacramento, California | Scott Lawrence | Benjamín Bonasso | 16th | 16th |
| United States | Dick's Sporting Goods Park | 18,061 | Commerce City, Colorado (Semi-finals) | Scott Lawrence | Benjamín Bonasso | 16th | 16th |
| United States | America First Field | 20,213 | Sandy, Utah (Grand Final) | Scott Lawrence | Benjamín Bonasso | 16th | 16th |

=== Squads ===
Note: Ages, caps and clubs/franchises are of 22 August 2025, the starting date of the tournament.

==== Canada ====
On 19 August, Canada named a 28-player squad ahead of the opening round of the Pacific Nations Cup.

On 25 August, Callum Botchar, Austin Creighton, Brock Gallagher and Shane O’Leary joined up with the squad ahead of their Round 2 clash with Japan, replacing Tyler Ardron, Cooper Coats, Talon McMullin and Evan Olmstead.

Ahead of the finals two rounds, Kainoa Lloyd and Jack Shaw were called up to the squad.

| Player | Position | Date of birth (age) | Caps | Club/province |
|---|---|---|---|---|
| Austin Creighton | Hooker | 6 June 2000 (aged 25) | 0 | (Canada) James Bay |
| Dewald Kotze | Hooker | 14 June 1997 (aged 28) | 6 | (United States) Seattle Seawolves |
| Jesse Mackail | Hooker | 18 May 1996 (aged 29) | 3 | (United States) Seattle Seawolves |
| Cole Keith | Prop | 7 May 1997 (aged 28) | 40 | (United States) New England Free Jacks |
| Cali Martinez | Prop | 13 October 1996 (aged 28) | 8 | (United States) Old Glory DC |
| Emerson Prior | Prop | 4 June 1998 (aged 27) | 1 | (United States) Utah Warriors |
| Kyle Steeves | Prop | 31 January 2000 (aged 25) | 3 | (United States) New England Free Jacks |
| Conor Young | Prop | 15 August 1995 (aged 30) | 12 | (United States) Los Angeles |
| Callum Botchar | Lock | 3 October 1997 (aged 27) | 5 | (United States) New Orleans Gold |
| Evan Olmstead | Lock | 21 February 1991 (aged 34) | 37 | (France) Agen |
| Izzak Kelly | Lock | 9 April 2000 (aged 25) | 0 | (Canada) Capilano |
| Tyler Ardron | Back row | 16 June 1991 (aged 34) | 41 | (France) Castres Olympique |
| Mason Flesch | Back row | 18 November 1999 (aged 25) | 13 | (United States) Chicago Hounds |
| Matt Heaton | Back row | 9 February 1993 (aged 32) | 38 | (United States) Los Angeles |
| Matthew Oworu | Back row | 29 July 2000 (aged 25) | 10 | (United States) Chicago Hounds |
| Siôn Parry | Back row | 29 October 1998 (aged 26) | 9 | (Wales) Ebbw Vale |
| Lucas Rumball | Back row | 2 August 1995 (aged 30) | 67 | (United States) Chicago Hounds |
| Piers von Dadelszen | Back row | 25 March 2000 (aged 25) | 6 | (United States) New England Free Jacks |
| Brock Gallagher | Scrum-half | 13 July 1998 (aged 27) | 7 | (United States) Seattle Seawolves |
| Jason Higgins | Scrum-half | 28 March 1995 (aged 30) | 21 | (United States) Chicago Hounds |
| Stephen Webb | Scrum-half | 15 December 2005 (aged 19) | 0 | (Canada) Balmy Beach RFC |
| Brenden Black | Fly-half | 28 April 2004 (aged 21) | 1 | (Canada) Oakville Crusaders |
| Peter Nelson | Fly-half | 5 October 1992 (aged 32) | 28 | (Ireland) Dungannon |
| Shane O'Leary | Fly-half | 12 March 1993 (aged 32) | 16 | (United States) Miami Sharks |
| Noah Flesch | Centre | 12 February 2003 (aged 22) | 4 | (United States) Chicago Hounds |
| Spencer Jones | Centre | 17 July 1997 (aged 28) | 9 | (United States) Utah Warriors |
| Ben LeSage | Centre | 24 November 1995 (aged 29) | 40 | (United States) New England Free Jacks |
| Talon McMullin | Centre | 5 January 2002 (aged 23) | 6 | (Canada) UBC Thunderbirds |
| Nic Benn | Wing | 28 April 2001 (aged 24) | 6 | (United States) Utah Warriors |
| Josiah Morra | Wing | 7 February 1998 (aged 27) | 7 | (United States) New England Free Jacks |
| Kainoa Lloyd | Wing | 21 May 1994 (aged 31) | 28 | (United States) New England Free Jacks |
| Isaac Olson | Wing | 1 July 2000 (aged 25) | 6 | (United States) New England Free Jacks |
| Jack Shaw | Wing | 21 May 1994 (aged 31) | 0 | (United States) New England Free Jacks |
| Cooper Coats | Fullback | 6 October 1996 (aged 28) | 19 | (United States) New Orleans Gold |

==== Fiji ====
On 11 August, Fiji named a 29-player squad ahead of the Pacific Nations Cup.

On 16 August, Semi Radradra withdrew from the squad due to injury and was replaced in the squad by Joji Nasova.

| Player | Position | Date of birth (age) | Caps | Club/province |
|---|---|---|---|---|
| Tevita Ikanivere | Hooker | 6 September 1999 (aged 25) | 24 | (Fiji) Fijian Drua |
| Zuriel Togiatama | Hooker | 3 February 1999 (aged 26) | 5 | (Fiji) Fijian Drua / Counties Manukau |
| Mesake Doge | Prop | 1 April 1993 (aged 32) | 19 | (Fiji) Fijian Drua |
| Haereiti Hetet | Prop | 10 July 1997 (aged 28) | 17 | (Fiji) Fijian Drua / Bay of Plenty |
| Eroni Mawi | Prop | 2 June 1996 (aged 29) | 42 | (England) Saracens |
| Samu Tawake | Prop | 11 November 1996 (aged 28) | 13 | (Fiji) Fijian Drua |
| Meli Tuni | Prop | 29 June 2000 (aged 25) | 1 | (Fiji) Fijian Drua |
| Temo Mayanavanua | Lock | 9 November 1997 (aged 27) | 26 | (England) Northampton Saints |
| Isoa Nasilasila | Lock | 13 September 1999 (aged 25) | 22 | (Fiji) Fijian Drua |
| Mesake Vocevoce | Lock | 16 May 2003 (aged 22) | 9 | (Fiji) Fijian Drua |
| Etonia Waqa | Lock | 2 June 1999 (aged 26) | 0 | (Fiji) Fijian Drua |
| Elia Canakaivata | Back row | 12 July 1996 (aged 29) | 12 | (Fiji) Fijian Drua |
| Viliame Mata | Back row | 22 October 1991 (aged 33) | 35 | (England) Bristol Bears |
| Motikai Murray | Back row | 8 August 2003 (aged 22) | 0 | (Fiji) Fijian Drua |
| Kitione Salawa Jr. | Back row | 23 May 2001 (aged 24) | 9 | (Fiji) Fijian Drua |
| Isoa Tuwai | Back row | 4 June 2002 (aged 23) | 0 | (Fiji) Fijian Drua |
| Simione Kuruvoli | Scrum-half | 2 January 1999 (aged 26) | 18 | (Fiji) Fijian Drua |
| Philip Baselala | Scrum-half | 14 September 2004 (aged 20) | 1 | (Fiji) Fijian Drua |
| Sam Wye | Scrum-half | 11 November 2000 (aged 24) | 1 | (New Zealand) Counties Manukau |
| Isaiah Armstrong-Ravula | Fly-half | 7 January 2004 (aged 21) | 11 | (Fiji) Fijian Drua |
| Caleb Muntz | Fly-half | 30 October 1999 (aged 25) | 15 | (Fiji) Fijian Drua |
| Semi Radradra | Centre | 13 June 1992 (aged 33) | 21 | (Japan) Shizuoka Blue Revs |
| Inia Tabuavou | Centre | 31 August 2002 (aged 22) | 8 | (Fiji) Fijian Drua |
| Seta Tamanivalu | Centre | 23 January 1992 (aged 33) | 3 | (Japan) Toshiba Brave Lupus Tokyo |
| Ponepati Loganimasi | Wing | 26 March 1998 (aged 27) | 4 | (Fiji) Fijian Drua |
| Joji Nasova | Wing | 9 June 2000 (aged 25) | 0 | (India) Hyderabad Heroes |
| Kalaveti Ravouvou | Wing | 6 June 1998 (aged 27) | 8 | (England) Bristol Bears |
| Taniela Rakuro | Wing | 28 May 2000 (aged 25) | 0 | (Fiji) Fijian Drua / Taranaki |
| Tuidraki Samusamuvodre | Fullback | 16 February 1998 (aged 27) | 0 | (Fiji) Fijian Drua |
| Kemu Valetini | Fullback | 26 August 1994 (aged 30) | 1 | (Fiji) Fijian Drua |

==== Japan ====
On 12 August, Japan named a 37-player squad ahead of the Pacific Nations Cup.

On 14 August, Yuki Ikeda withdrew due to injury and was replaced by Charlie Lawrence.

On 16 August, Ryōsuke Iwaihara and Yuya Hirose were additional call-ups, with Hirose replacing the injured Siosaia Fifita.

On 19 August, Epineri Uluiviti withdrew from the squad due to injury.

On 20 August, Yota Kamimori withdrew form the squad due to injury and was replaced by Taishi Tsumura.

| Player | Position | Date of birth (age) | Caps | Club/province |
|---|---|---|---|---|
| Hayate Era | Hooker | 18 September 2001 (aged 23) | 1 | (Japan) Kubota Spears |
| Mamoru Harada | Hooker | 15 April 1999 (aged 26) | 12 | (Japan) Toshiba Brave Lupus |
| Kenji Sato | Hooker | 4 January 2003 (aged 22) | 0 | (Japan) Saitama Wild Knights |
| Ryosuke Iwaihara | Prop | 6 October 1996 (aged 28) | 0 | (Japan) Yokohama Canon Eagles |
| Yota Kamimori | Prop | 26 April 1999 (aged 26) | 2 | (Japan) Kubota Spears |
| Sanshiro Kihara | Prop | 20 January 2003 (aged 22) | 0 | (Japan) Tokyo Sungoliath |
| Sena Kimura | Prop | 24 June 1999 (aged 26) | 1 | (Japan) Toshiba Brave Lupus |
| Kenta Kobayashi | Prop | 2 June 1999 (aged 26) | 0 | (Japan) Tokyo Sungoliath |
| Taishi Tsumura | Prop | 30 April 2001 (aged 24) | 0 | (Japan) Black Rams Tokyo |
| Shuhei Takeuchi | Prop | 9 December 1997 (aged 27) | 15 | (Japan) Tokyo Sungoliath |
| Keijiro Tamefusa | Prop | 3 September 2001 (aged 23) | 11 | (Japan) Kubota Spears |
| Jack Cornelsen | Lock | 13 October 1994 (aged 30) | 22 | (Japan) Saitama Wild Knights |
| Warner Dearns | Lock | 11 April 2002 (aged 23) | 23 | (Japan) Toshiba Brave Lupus |
| Shohei Ito | Lock | 1 May 1997 (aged 28) | 0 | (Japan) Toshiba Brave Lupus |
| Waisake Raratubua | Lock | 17 March 1998 (aged 27) | 2 | (Japan) Kobe Steelers |
| Epineri Uluiviti | Lock | 7 July 1996 (aged 29) | 8 | (Japan) Sagamihara DynaBoars |
| Tiennan Costley | Back row | 14 June 2000 (aged 25) | 6 | (Japan) Kobe Steelers |
| Amato Fakatava | Back row | 7 December 1994 (aged 30) | 14 | (Japan) Black Rams Tokyo |
| Ben Gunter | Back row | 24 October 1997 (aged 27) | 11 | (Japan) Saitama Wild Knights |
| Faulua Makisi | Back row | 20 January 1997 (aged 28) | 16 | (Japan) Kubota Spears |
| Akito Okui | Back row | 17 September 2001 (aged 23) | 0 | (Japan) Toyota Verblitz |
| Amanaki Saumaki | Back row | 8 March 1997 (aged 28) | 5 | (Japan) Kobe Steelers |
| Kanji Shimokawa | Back row | 17 January 1999 (aged 26) | 14 | (Japan) Tokyo Sungoliath |
| Shu Yamamoto | Back row | 1 June 1996 (aged 29) | 0 | (Japan) Black Rams Tokyo |
| Shinobu Fujiwara | Scrum-half | 8 February 1999 (aged 26) | 12 | (Japan) Kubota Spears |
| Kenta Fukuda | Scrum-half | 19 December 1996 (aged 28) | 1 | (Japan) Tokyo Sungoliath |
| Shuntaro Kitamura | Scrum-half | 28 March 2002 (aged 23) | 1 | (Japan) Shizuoka Blue Revs |
| Sam Greene | Fly-half | 16 August 1994 (aged 31) | 1 | (Japan) Shizuoka Blue Revs |
| Ichigo Nakakusu | Fly-half | 1 June 2000 (aged 25) | 2 | (Japan) Black Rams Tokyo |
| Lee Seung-sin | Fly-half | 13 January 2001 (aged 24) | 20 | (Japan) Kobe Steelers |
| Yuya Hirose | Centre | 7 April 2001 (aged 24) | 0 | (Japan) Kubota Spears Funabashi Tokyo Bay |
| Yuki Ikeda | Centre | 21 May 1995 (aged 30) | 0 | (Japan) Black Rams Tokyo |
| Charlie Lawrence | Centre | 27 May 1998 (aged 27) | 0 | (Japan) Mitsubishi Sagamihara DynaBoars |
| Shōgo Nakano | Centre | 11 June 1997 (aged 28) | 9 | (Japan) Tokyo Sungoliath |
| Tomoki Osada | Centre | 25 November 1999 (aged 25) | 17 | (Japan) Saitama Wild Knights |
| Dylan Riley | Centre | 2 May 1997 (aged 28) | 30 | (Japan) Saitama Wild Knights |
| Siosaia Fifita | Wing | 20 December 1998 (aged 26) | 16 | (Japan) Toyota Verblitz |
| Kippei Ishida | Wing | 28 April 2000 (aged 25) | 2 | (Japan) Yokohama Canon Eagles |
| Haruto Kida | Wing | 9 April 1999 (aged 26) | 0 | (Japan) Kubota Spears |
| Malo Tuitama | Wing | 23 March 1996 (aged 29) | 8 | (Japan) Shizuoka Blue Revs |
| Jingo Takenoshita | Fullback | 11 June 2004 (aged 21) | 0 | (Japan) Meiji University |

==== Samoa ====
On 14 August, Samoa named a 28-player squad ahead of the Pacific Nations Cup.

After Samoa's bye week in round 2, Malaesaili Elato and Alamanda Motuga were included in Samoa's team for their round 3 game.

Ahead of Samoa's fifth-place play-off match against the USA, Potu Leavasa Jr., Abraham Papali'i and Christian Leali'ifano were called up to the squad.

| Player | Position | Date of birth (age) | Caps | Club/province |
|---|---|---|---|---|
| Pita Anae Ah-Sue | Hooker | 16 December 1992 (aged 32) | 1 | (United States) Houston Sabercats / Waikato |
| Ray Niuia | Hooker | 19 June 1991 (aged 34) | 15 | (New Zealand) Massey |
| Luteru Tolai | Hooker | 1 June 1998 (aged 27) | 7 | (France) Biarritz |
| Jarred Adams | Prop | 26 September 1996 (aged 28) | 0 | (New Zealand) Suburbs Rugby Club |
| Michael Alaalatoa | Prop | 28 August 1991 (aged 33) | 20 | (France) Clermont |
| Brad Amituanai | Prop | | 0 | (Australia) Waratahs |
| Marco Fepulea'i | Prop | 25 April 1995 (aged 30) | 7 | (France) Colomiers |
| Aki Seiuli | Prop | 22 December 1992 (aged 32) | 10 | (United States) Utah Warriors |
| Michael Curry | Lock | 2 March 1994 (aged 31) | 9 | (New Zealand) Moana Pasifika |
| Malaesaili Elato | Lock | | 0 | (New Zealand) Marist Rugby Club |
| Potu Leavasa Jr. | Lock | 10 January 1996 (aged 29) | 0 | (Australia) Palmyra Rugby Club |
| Ben Nee-Nee | Lock | 12 May 1993 (aged 32) | 10 | (Japan) Kamaishi Seawaves |
| Sam Slade | Lock | 28 August 1997 (aged 27) | 13 | (New Zealand) Moana Pasifika |
| Niko Jones | Back row | 22 July 2000 (aged 25) | 1 | (New Zealand) Waitemata |
| Iakopo Mapu | Back row | 4 November 1997 (aged 27) | 8 | (France) Stade Français |
| Theo McFarland (c) | Back row | 16 October 1995 (aged 29) | 20 | (England) Saracens |
| Alamanda Motuga | Back row | 11 September 1994 (aged 30) | 7 | (New Zealand) Moana Pasifika |
| Olajuwon Noa | Back row | 28 December 1989 (aged 35) | 7 | (United States) Seattle Seawolves |
| Abraham Papali'i | Back row | 20 June 1993 (aged 32) | 0 | (France) Castres Olympique |
| Taleni Seu | Back row | 26 December 1993 (aged 31) | 11 | (Japan) Toyota Industries Shuttles Aichi |
| Joel Lam | Scrum-half | 17 May 2002 (aged 23) | 0 | (New Zealand) Burnside Rugby Club |
| Melani Matavao | Scrum-half | 19 November 1995 (aged 29) | 22 | (New Zealand) Moana Pasifika |
| Connor Tupai | Scrum-half | 8 December 1999 (aged 25) | 1 | (United States) San Diego Legion |
| AJ Alatimu | Fly-half | 25 March 1993 (aged 32) | 7 | (New Zealand) Counties Manukau |
| Rodney Iona | Fly-half | 17 August 1991 (aged 34) | 12 | (United States) Seattle Seawolves |
| Christian Leali'ifano | Fly-half | 24 September 1987 (aged 37) | 8 | Unattached |
| Melani Nanai | Centre | 3 August 1993 (aged 32) | 2 | (Canada) Capilano |
| Henry Taefu | Centre | 2 April 1993 (aged 32) | 12 | (Japan) Red Hurricanes Osaka |
| Elisapeta Alofipo | Wing | 11 December 1997 (aged 27) | 2 | (Australia) Hunter Wildfires |
| Tuna Tuitama | Wing | 25 February 2000 (aged 25) | 5 | (New Zealand) Moana Pasifika |
| Lolagi Visinia | Wing | 17 January 1993 (aged 32) | 3 | (New Zealand) Suburbs Rugby Club |
| Tomasi Alosio | Fullback | 26 January 1992 (aged 33) | 9 | (New Zealand) Ardmore Marist |
| Theodore Steffany | Fullback | | 0 | (New Zealand) Auckland Marist |

==== Tonga ====
On 18 August, Tonga named a 30-player squad ahead of the Pacific Nations Cup.

Ahead of the final two rounds, Tevita Ahokovi, Tau Koloamatangi, Leopino Maupese, Siaosi Nai, Sam Tuitupou and Veikoso Poloniati were called up to the squad.

| Player | Position | Date of birth (age) | Caps | Club/province |
|---|---|---|---|---|
| Siua Maile | Hooker | 18 February 1997 (aged 28) | 14 | (Italy) Benetton |
| Sam Moli | Hooker | 24 December 1998 (aged 26) | 19 | (New Zealand) Moana Pasifika |
| Sosefo Sakalia | Hooker | 14 December 1991 (aged 33) | 22 | (Tonga) Kolomotu’a RC |
| Siegfried Fisiʻihoi | Prop | 8 June 1987 (aged 38) | 28 | (France) Massy |
| Feao Fotuaika | Prop | 23 April 1993 (aged 32) | 5 | (Australia) ACT Brumbies |
| Tau Koloamatangi | Prop | 3 January 1995 (aged 30) | 16 | Unattached |
| Leopino Maupese | Prop | | 0 | (Australia) Wests Rugby |
| Ben Tameifuna | Prop | 30 August 1991 (aged 33) | 40 | (France) Bordeaux Bègles |
| Salesi Tuifua | Prop | 27 December 2002 (aged 22) | 4 | (New Zealand) Pakuranga |
| Solomone Tukuafu | Prop | 13 September 1996 (aged 28) | 0 | (France) Biarritz |
| Tupou Afungia | Lock | 12 September 1999 (aged 25) | 6 | (United States) New Orleans Gold |
| Tevita Ahokovi | Lock | | 6 | (Australia) Gordon RFC |
| Leva Fifita | Lock | 29 July 1989 (aged 36) | 36 | (France) Narbonne |
| Harison Mataele | Lock | 1 January 1994 (aged 31) | 10 | (France) Mont-de-Marsan |
| Justin Mataele | Lock | | 3 | (England) Bury St Edmunds |
| Veikoso Poloniati | Lock | 27 August 1995 (age 31) | 3 | Unattached |
| Talimoni Finau | Back row | 13 February 1996 (aged 29) | 0 | (New Zealand) Takapuna |
| Tanginoa Halaifonua | Back row | 20 September 1996 (aged 28) | 16 | (France) Stade Français |
| Lotu Inisi | Back row | 26 April 1999 (aged 26) | 10 | (New Zealand) Moana Pasifika |
| Fotu Lokotui | Back row | 19 March 1992 (aged 33) | 18 | (France) Agen |
| Siosiua Moala | Back row | 29 May 1989 (aged 36) | 2 | (New Zealand) Poverty Bay |
| Sam Tuitupou | Back row | | 2 | Tonga sevens |
| Aisea Halo | Scrum-half | 29 June 1993 (aged 32) | 11 | (New Zealand) Moana Pasifika |
| Siaosi Nai | Scrum-half | 9 September 1999 (aged 25) | 1 | |
| Augustine Pulu | Scrum-half | 4 January 1990 (aged 35) | 6 | (Japan) Hino Red Dolphins |
| Sonatane Takulua | Scrum-half | 11 January 1991 (aged 34) | 57 | (France) Chambéry |
| James Faiva | Fly-half | 13 June 1994 (aged 31) | 20 | (Australia) West Harbour |
| Patrick Pellegrini | Fly-half | 28 September 1998 (aged 26) | 12 | (New Zealand) Moana Pasifika |
| Willis Halaholo | Centre | 6 June 1990 (aged 35) | 0 | (New Zealand) Suburbs |
| Solomone Kata | Centre | 3 December 1994 (aged 30) | 12 | (England) Leicester Tigers |
| Fetuli Paea | Centre | 16 August 1994 (aged 31) | 15 | (Italy) Zebre Parma |
| Nikolai Foliaki | Wing | 25 December 1997 (aged 27) | 8 | (United States) New Orleans Gold |
| Fine Inisi | Wing | 19 May 1998 (aged 27) | 14 | (New Zealand) Moana Pasifika |
| John Tapueluelu | Wing | 7 April 1999 (aged 26) | 5 | (New Zealand) Alhambra |
| Charles Piutau | Fullback | 31 October 1991 (aged 33) | 9 | (Japan) Shizuoka Blue Revs |
| Josiah Unga | Fullback | 15 May 2003 (aged 22) | 3 | (New Zealand) Auckland Marist |

==== United States ====
On 14 August, the United States announced a 39-player squad ahead of the Pacific Nations Cup.

Ahead of USA's second game in round 3, Luke Carty was called up to the squad.

| Player | Position | Date of birth (age) | Caps | Club/province |
|---|---|---|---|---|
| Kaleb Geiger | Hooker | May 4, 1996 (aged 29) | 5 | (United States) New England Free Jacks |
| Shilo Klein | Hooker | May 4, 1999 (aged 26) | 5 | (United States) San Diego Legion |
| Kapeli Pifeleti | Hooker | September 1, 1999 (aged 25) | 19 | (France) Provence |
| Pono Davis | Prop | August 4, 1997 (aged 28) | 8 | (United States) Houston SaberCats |
| Jack Iscaro | Prop | August 4, 1997 (aged 28) | 13 | (United States) Old Glory DC |
| Tonga Kofe | Prop | February 2, 1996 (aged 29) | 3 | (England) Leicester Tigers |
| Ezekiel Lindenmuth | Prop | July 14, 1997 (aged 28) | 1 | (United States) Houston Sabercats |
| Alec McDonnell | Prop | July 16, 1996 (aged 29) | 0 | Unattached |
| Maliu Niuafe | Prop | | 0 | (United States) San Diego Legion |
| Payton Talea | Prop | August 17, 1998 (aged 27) | 3 | (United States) San Diego Legion |
| Jake Turnbull | Prop | July 17, 1993 (aged 32) | 14 | (Australia) Eastern Suburbs |
| Jason Damm | Lock | January 26, 1995 (aged 30) | 9 | (United States) San Diego Legion |
| Nafi Ma'afu | Lock | June 18, 1998 (aged 27) | 0 | (France) Montauban |
| Tevita Naqali | Lock | June 21, 1996 (aged 29) | 3 | (United States) Old Glory DC |
| Marno Redelinghuys | Lock | January 6, 1993 (aged 32) | 3 | (United States) Houston Sabercats |
| Rick Rose | Lock | July 28, 2001 (aged 24) | 0 | Unattached |
| Makeen Alikhan | Back row | October 10, 2001 (aged 23) | 2 | (United States) Anthem RC |
| Benjamín Bonasso (c) | Back row | June 1, 1997 (aged 28) | 10 | Unattached |
| Cory Daniel | Back row | September 11, 1995 (aged 29) | 13 | (United States) Old Glory DC |
| Vili Helu | Back row | March 20, 1996 (aged 29) | 17 | (United States) San Diego Legion |
| Christian Poidevin | Back row | September 9, 1998 (aged 26) | 2 | (United States) San Diego Legion |
| Paddy Ryan | Back row | December 11, 1990 (aged 34) | 14 | (United States) San Diego Legion |
| Lance Williams | Back row | February 19, 1993 (aged 32) | 9 | (United States) Utah Warriors |
| Ruben de Haas | Scrum-half | October 9, 1998 (aged 26) | 36 | Unattached |
| Ethan McVeigh | Scrum-half | December 14, 1999 (aged 25) | 4 | (United States) Old Glory DC |
| Juan-Philip Smith | Scrum-half | March 30, 1994 (aged 31) | 9 | (United States) Seattle Seawolves |
| Luke Carty | Fly-half | 24 September 1997 (aged 27) | 22 | Unattached |
| Christopher Hilsenbeck | Fly-half | January 10, 1992 (aged 33) | 2 | (United States) Chicago Hounds |
| AJ MacGinty | Fly-half | February 26, 1990 (aged 35) | 42 | (England) Bristol Bears |
| Tom Pittman | Fly-half | April 8, 1999 (aged 26) | 2 | (United States) Anthem RC |
| Dominic Besag | Centre | August 6, 2004 (aged 21) | 9 | (United States) Saint Mary's |
| Tommaso Boni | Centre | January 15, 1993 (aged 32) | 9 | (United States) Old Glory DC |
| Tavite Lopeti | Centre | November 20, 1998 (aged 26) | 21 | (United States) San Diego Legion |
| Erich Storti | Centre | October 14, 2000 (aged 24) | 4 | (United States) Anthem RC |
| Nate Augspurger | Wing | January 31, 1990 (aged 35) | 51 | (United States) Chicago Hounds |
| Noah Brown | Wing | October 1, 2001 (aged 23) | 1 | (United States) Chicago Hounds |
| Lauina Futi | Wing | January 5, 1996 (aged 29) | 5 | (United States) Seattle Seawolves |
| Rufus McLean | Wing | March 2, 2000 (aged 25) | 1 | (United States) Houston Sabercats |
| Toby Fricker | Fullback | April 15, 1996 (aged 29) | 5 | (United States) Anthem RC |
| Mitch Wilson | Fullback | April 15, 1996 (aged 29) | 13 | (United States) Anthem RC |

== See also ==
- 2027 Men's Rugby World Cup qualifying
- 2027 Men's Rugby World Cup – Regional play-off and Final Qualification Tournament
- 2025 mid-year rugby union tests
