= Valetini =

Valetini is a surname. Notable people with the surname include:

- Kemu Valetini (born 1994), Fijian rugby union player
- Rob Valetini (born 1998), Australian rugby union player
