= Tukuafu =

Tukuafu is a surname. Notable people with the surname include:

- Will Tukuafu (born 1984), American football player
- Solomone Tukuafu, New Zealand rugby union player
