= Tevita Tuʻifua =

Tonga international rugby union player

- Born: Tevita Hemilitoni Tu'ifua; October 15, 1975 (age 51) Nomuka, Tonga
- Height: 6 ft 0 in (1.83 m)
- Weight: 213 lb (97 kg)

Rugby union career
- Position(s): Wing, Centre
Amateur team(s)
Years	Team	Apps	(Points)
2004–2005	Te Papapa Onehunga		
2006–2007	Karaka		
2009	Mt Wellington RFC		
Provincial / State sides
Years	Team	Apps	(Points)
2004	Auckland	4	(25)
2005–2007	Counties Manukau	15	(30)
2008	Taranaki		
International career
Years	Team	Apps	(Points)
2003–2007	Tonga	15	(20)
National sevens team
Years	Team		Comps
2002–2007	Tonga 7s		12
Coaching career
- Years: Team
- 2012–2024: Tonga 7s
- 2024–: Tonga

Tevita Tu'ifua (born 15 October 1975) is a Tongan rugby union coach and former player who played wing and centre.

He is the current head coach of the Tongan national team having previously coached the national 7s side, who he also represented as a player.

== Playing career ==
Born in Nomuka, Tonga, Tuʻifua played primarily as a wing and centre. He earned 15 caps for the Tongan national team between 2003 and 2007, scoring 20 points through four tries. He debuted on 4 July 2003 in a match against Fiji in Nadi and later went on to represent Tonga in two Rugby World Cups, participating in three matches in 2003 and four matches in 2007.

He also played internationally for the Tonga 7s side, playing in 12 events on the World Rugby Sevens Series from 2002 and 2007, debuting during the 2003 Brisbane Sevens. He also represented Tonga during the 2006 Commonwealth Games in Melbourne.

At the club level, he played for Auckland from 2003 before moving to Counties Manukau in 2005 and later Taranaki in 2008. His provincial career in New Zealand included 19 games, during which he scored a total of 55 points.

Prior to his provincial career, Tuʻifua played amateur rugby for Te Papapa Onehunga and Karaka, before ending with Mt Wellington RFC in 2009.

Tuʻifua also represented Tonga at international Rugby League level.

== Coaching career ==
After retiring from playing, Tuʻifua transitioned into coaching, firstly as the defence coach for Tonga 7s from 2012, before becoming the head coach in 2018.

As head coach, he led Tonga 7s in two World Rugby Sevens Series events during the 2018–19 season, and in the inaugural World Rugby Sevens Challenger Series in 2020. He also led the side to the 2022 Commonwealth Games (finishing in 11th place) and the 2022 Rugby World Cup Sevens (finishing in 20th place).

Despite performances on the world stage in 2022, Tonga later went onto to become champions of the Challenger Series in 2023.

In 2024, Tuʻifua was appointed as the new head coach of the national team at 15s level, replacing Toutai Kefu who had been in post since 2016. This was not the first time Tuʻifua had been involved in coaching at 15s, having been assistant coach to Mana Otai during the 2015 World Rugby Pacific Nations Cup, seeing Tonga finish third, and the 2015 Rugby World Cup.

Tuʻifua's first campaign in charge was winless home series during the 2014 July tests, with losses to Italy, Spain and the Queensland Reds. His first win came in September against Canada (30–17) to see the Ikale Tahi finish in fifth place during the 2024 World Rugby Pacific Nations Cup.

Tonga later went on to lose all their games during the November tests, losing to Romania, USA and Georgia.

Sporting positions
Preceded by (Australia) Toutai Kefu	Tonga National Rugby Union Coach; 2024–Present	Succeeded by Incumbent
