= 2024 MLR Draft =

General information
- Date: August 28, 2024

Overview
- League: Major League Rugby
- First selection: Erich Storti, Center, Anthem RC

The 2024 Major League Rugby Collegiate Draft was the fifth annual for rugby union in North America, held on August 28, 2024.

== Format ==
The 2024 MLR Collegiate Draft was held on August 28, 2024. For the first time, the draft was hosted on The Rugby Network. The fifth iteration of the draft was also shorter, featuring 36 players selected compared to 39 in the previous two seasons.

== Player selections ==
Rd	Pick #	MLR team	Player	College
1	1	Anthem RC	Erich Storti	Saint Mary's College of California
1	2	Anthem RC	Neil Jacob Trainor	Queen's University
1	3	Miami Sharks	Calvin Michael Ihrig	Lindenwood
1	4	New England Free Jacks	Kaipono Kayoshi	Saint Mary's College of California
1	5	Anthem RC	Jeron Wayne Pantor	Life University
1	6	New Orleans Gold	Aidan Warwick King	Pennsylvania State University
1	7	San Diego Legion	Inoke Waqavesi	Saint Mary's College of California
1	8	Houston SaberCats	Alex Aguero	California
1	9	Dallas Jackals	Darius Law	Life University
1	10	Chicago Hounds	Peyton Justin Wall	Indiana
1	11	Seattle Seawolves	Calvin Liulamaga	Central Washington University
1	12	Old Glory DC	Raymond Lawrence Santiago	Rennselaer Polytechnic Institute
2	13	Anthem RC	Ernest Vailou George Freeman	Arizona
2	14	New England Free Jacks	Matthew Carrion	Life University
2	15	Old Glory DC	Aidan Scott Ridgway	Arkansas State University
2	16	Utah Warriors	Ammon Tielu Sagala	BYU
2	17	Old Glory DC	Aaron Tanaka Juma	Wheeling University
2	18	New Orleans Gold	Dalton West Musselman	Pennsylvania State University
2	19	San Diego Legion	Hunter Chuhlantseff	Saint Mary's College of California
2	20	Houston SaberCats	Jake Negrete	Saint Mary's College of California
2	21	Seattle Seawolves	Joshua Thomas Schwartz	Queens University of Charlotte
2	22	Chicago Hounds	Jake Chandler Kinneeveauk	University of Utah
2	23	Seattle Seawolves	Connor Richard Williams	University of Ottawa
2	24	Anthem RC	Le'Donn Mathis	Lindenwood
3	25	Anthem RC	Ashawnty Staples	Notre Dame College
3	26	RFC Los Angeles	Patrick Maurice Beattie	California State University, Long Beach
3	27	Miami Sharks	Lautoro Soto Ansay	Lindenwood
3	28	Utah Warriors	Cole Pearce Semu	BYU
3	29	Old Glory DC	Sebastian Schefermann	Mary Washington University
3	30	Utah Warriors	Nicholas Andiarena	Adrian College
3	31	San Diego Legion	Daniel George Bay	UC Santa Barbara
3	32	RFC Los Angeles	Caleb Tomasin	California
3	33	RFC Los Angeles	Lleyton Christian Delzell	Saint Mary's College of California
3	34	Chicago Hounds	Alexander Amid Hernandez	Marian University
3	35	Seattle Seawolves	Jamie Jason Robert Armstrong	University of Ottawa
3	36	New England Free Jacks	Emanuel Lai	Santa Clara University

Source: MLR
