= Hayate Era =

Hayate Era 江良颯
- Era with Japan in 2026
- Born: 18 September 2001 (age 25) Higashiōsaka, Osaka, Japan
- Height: 172 cm (5 ft 8 in)
- Weight: 106 kg (234 lb; 16 st 10 lb)
- University: Teikyo University

Rugby union career
- Position: Hooker
- Current team: Kubota Spears
Youth career
- 2017–2020: Osaka Tōin High School
- 2020–2024: Teikyo University
Senior career
Years	Team	Apps	(Points)
2024–	Kubota Spears	37	(40)
- Correct as of 10 November 2026
International career
Years	Team	Apps	(Points)
2018	Japan U17		
2025	Japan XV	1	(0)
2025–	Japan	11	(20)
- Correct as of 10 November 2026

Hayate Era (Japanese: 江良颯, romanized: Era Hayate; born 18 September 2001) is a Japanese rugby union player who currently plays as a hooker for the Japan Rugby League One club the Kubota Spears and the Japan national team.

== Youth career ==
Era was born in Higashiōsaka, Osaka Prefecture in 2001 and began playing rugby at 2-years-old, attending OTJ Rugby School and Higashiōsaka Rugby School in his early years where his primary position was in the backline. In junior and senior grade, Era made the transition to the hooker position while attending Hiraoka Junior High School and Osaka Tōin High School between 2017 and 2020. During his time at the latter institution, Era represented Kinki U17 at the Kobelco Cup, the national high school representative tournament, winning the competition in 2018. He was later selected in a Japan U17 squad, also known as the Japan high school national team.

In 2020, Era joined Teikyo University. Upon his acquisition, Japanese publication 4 years. noted his ball-carrying ability, and mentioned his potential as a first-team hooker. During his tenure at Teikyo, Era won three back-to-back All-Japan University Rugby Championship titles as the teams starting hooker, captaining the side in his fourth and final year at the school.

== Career ==
=== Kubota Spears ===
As one of the most sought-after young forwards in Japan, it was speculated that Era would likely be recruited by the Tokyo Sungoliath or the Mie Honda Heat in the Japan Rugby League One ahead of the 2023–24 season. In January 2024, the Kubota Spears announced the signing of Era via their Instagram. He played his first game for the club against the Chiefs from the Super Rugby in a pre-season fixture.

In the 2023–24 season, Era played six matches for the Spears after returning from university, scoring three tries from his opening three games. Following his sixth appearance, the Spears announced that Era would be out of the squad for an extended period to undergo surgery after sustaining an injury.

Era returned to the squad ahead of their pre-season for the following season (2024–25). He played 19 games, starting in just under half below starting hooker Malcolm Marx, which saw the Spears run into the final where Era scored three tries. Era's presence declined in 2025–26 as he returned from injury sustained while playing for the Japan national team in late 2025. Era played 12 games, starting in four, scoring two tries as the Kubota Spears finished runners-up for the second year in a row.

== International career ==
In June 2025, Era was announced in the Japan XV squad for their June match against the Māori All Blacks. He made his international debut against the Māori All Blacks on 28 June at the Chichibunomiya Rugby Stadium. Japan XV lost 20–53. The following month, Era was named as the reserve hooker for Japan in their opening match of the Welsh tour, although he did not make an appearance. He subsequently made his official Test debut against Wales in the second Test, coming off the bench for Mamoru Harada in the 37th minute at Noevir Stadium Kobe. Although Japan lost the match, the series was drawn 1–1.

Era made his first Test start for Japan at hooker against Canada in their first match of the Pacific Nations Cup in what was a record win against the side. Era scored his first Test try for Japan against Tonga in the tournaments semi-final match, which was subsequently another record win by the Japan team. In the tournament final, Era, starting in his fourth straight Test for Japan, scored a double against Fiji at America First Field in Salt Lake City.

Following Japan's Test match against Australia in the 2025 Autumn Internationals, Era suffered a serious injury and did not return to fitness for several months. He made his Test return in the inaugural Nations Championship in July 2026, playing in all three of Japan's Tests against Italy, Ireland, and France, respectively.

== Career statistics ==
=== Club ===
As of 11 November 2026.

Statistics by club, season and competition
Club	Season	League			
Club	Season	Division	Apps	Tries	Points
Kubota Spears	2023–24	Japan Rugby League One	6	3	15
Kubota Spears	2024–25	Japan Rugby League One	19	3	15
Kubota Spears	2025–26	Japan Rugby League One	12	2	10
Kubota Spears	Total		37	8	40

=== International ===
As of 11 November 2026.

Statistics by team and year
Team	Year	Statistic		
Team	Year	Apps	Tries	Points
Japan XV	2025	1	0	0
Japan	2025	6	3	15
Japan	2026	5	1	5
Total		11	4	20

=== International tries ===
List of international tries scored by Hayate Era
No.	Opponent	Location	Competition	Date	Result	Ref.
1	Tonga	Dick's Sporting Goods Park, Commerce City	2025 Pacific Nations Cup	14 September 2025	62–24	
2	Fiji	America First Field, Salt Lake City	2025 Pacific Nations Cup	20 September 2025	27–33	
3	Fiji	America First Field, Salt Lake City	2025 Pacific Nations Cup	20 September 2025	27–33	
4	Ireland	Newcastle International Sports Centre, Newcastle	2026 Nations Championship	11 July 2026	20–36	

== Awards and honours ==
Teikyo University

- All-Japan University Rugby Championship: 2022, 2023, 2024
