= Isaac Olson =

Canada international rugby union player

- Isaac Olson on April 15, 2023 at York Lions Stadium in Toronto
- Born: 1 July 2000 (age 26) Vernon, British Columbia, Canada
- Height: 1.90 m (6 ft 3 in)
- Weight: 102 kg (16.1 st; 225 lb)

Rugby union career
- Position: Wing
Senior career
Years	Team	Apps	(Points)
2022–	New England Free Jacks	23	(10)
- Correct as of 7 July 2025
International career
Years	Team	Apps	(Points)
2021–	Canada	5	(10)
- Correct as of 7 July 2025

Isaac Kenneth Olson (born 1 July 2000) is a Canadian rugby union player, currently playing for the New England Free Jacks of Major League Rugby (MLR) and the Canada national team. His preferred position is wing.

== Early life ==
A native of Vernon, British Columbia, Olson played rugby through high school at Fulton Secondary School where he also played American football and basketball. Following his graduation in 2018, Olson began playing club rugby with Coldstream Rugby Club and Okanagan RFC.

== Professional career ==
Olson would play for the Pacific Pride Academy before joining the MLR.

Olson signed for Major League Rugby side New England Free Jacks for the 2022 Major League Rugby season.

International Career

He represented Canada’s U20 team and developed at the Pacific Pride Academy, where he honed his rugby skills.

Olson debuted for Canada against Belgium during the 2021 end-of-year rugby union internationals.

== Honours ==
New England Free Jacks

- Major League Rugby Championship: 3x (2023, 2024, 2025)
