= Matt Oworu =

Canadian rugby union player

- Full name: Matthew Oworu
- Born: 29 July 2000 (age 26) Calgary, Alberta , Canada
- Height: 188 cm (6 ft 2 in)
- Weight: 111 kg (245 lb; 17 st 7 lb)
- Notable relative: James Oworu (brother)

Rugby union career
- Position: Flanker / Number 8
- Current team: Chicago Hounds
Senior career
Years	Team	Apps	(Points)
2025–	Chicago Hounds	13	(0)
- Correct as of 13 December 2025
International career
Years	Team	Apps	(Points)
2022–	Canada	16	(20)
- Correct as of 13 December 2025
National sevens team
Years	Team		Comps
2021–2024	Canada Sevens		26
- Correct as of 13 December 2025

Matt Oworu (born 29 July 2000) is a Canadian rugby union player, currently playing for Chicago Hounds in Major League Rugby (MLR). His preferred position is flanker or number 8.

== Early career ==
Oworu is from Calgary in Alberta , but grew up in Zimbabwe where he first began playing rugby, before returning to Canada to represent join the Pacific Pride system. While in Zimbabwe, Oworu studied at Lewisam Primary School and Churchill high school and captained the Zimbabwe U18 side at Craven Week and Zimbabwe U20.

== Professional career ==
Oworu started out professionally representing the Canada Sevens, debuting at the 2021 Canada Sevens in Vancouver. He would appear at a further 25 tournaments for the side, including the 2022 Commonwealth Games, and 2022 Rugby Sevens World Cup, before committed to the 15-aside game. He signed for the Chicago Hounds ahead of the 2025 Major League Rugby season, debuting in round 4 of the season against the Miami Sharks. He re-signed for the side ahead of the 2026 season.

Oworu made his debut for the Canada national team in July 2022, debuting against Belgium .
