= Mt Wellington RFC =

Coordinates: 36.9091489°S 174.8349046°E

(New Zealand) Mount Wellington Rugby Football Club
- Union: Auckland Rugby Football Union
- Location: Mt Wellington, Auckland
- Ground: Hamlin Park
- President: Mike Makaua
- League: Auckland Premier

Official website
- www.mtwellingtonrugby.co.nz

Mt Wellington Rugby Football Club is a rugby union club based in Auckland, New Zealand. At senior level, the club fields four teams - Premier, Reserves, U-21 and U-19 - through a joint venture with Te Papapa Onehunga RFC.
