= Kyle Steeves =

Canadian rugby union player

- Born: 31 January 2000 (age 26) Winnipeg, Canada
- Height: 185 cm (6 ft 1 in)
- Weight: 116 kg (256 lb; 18 st 4 lb)

Rugby union career
- Position: Prop
- Current team: New England free jacks
Senior career
Years	Team	Apps	(Points)
2023–2024	Dallas Jackals	31	(10)
2025-	New England Free Jacks	7	(5)
- Correct as of 5 July 2025
International career
Years	Team	Apps	(Points)
2022–	Canada	1	(0)
- Correct as of 17 March 2024

Kyle Steeves (born 31 January 2000) is a Canadian rugby union player, currently playing for the New England free jacks in Major League Rugby (MLR). His preferred position is prop.

== Early career ==
Steeves is from Winnipeg and attended St. Paul's High School, where he wrestled before playing rugby. He plays his club rugby for the Manitoba Wombats.

== Professional career ==
Steeves played for the Pacific Pride before joining the Dallas Jackals ahead of the 2023 Major League Rugby season. He would play for them the following year in 2024. He would then sign with the New England Free jacks in 2025 winning a MLR championship.

Steeves made his Canada debut in 2022, featuring in the match against Namibia.
