= Damián Schneider =

Argentine rugby union referee

Damian Schneider
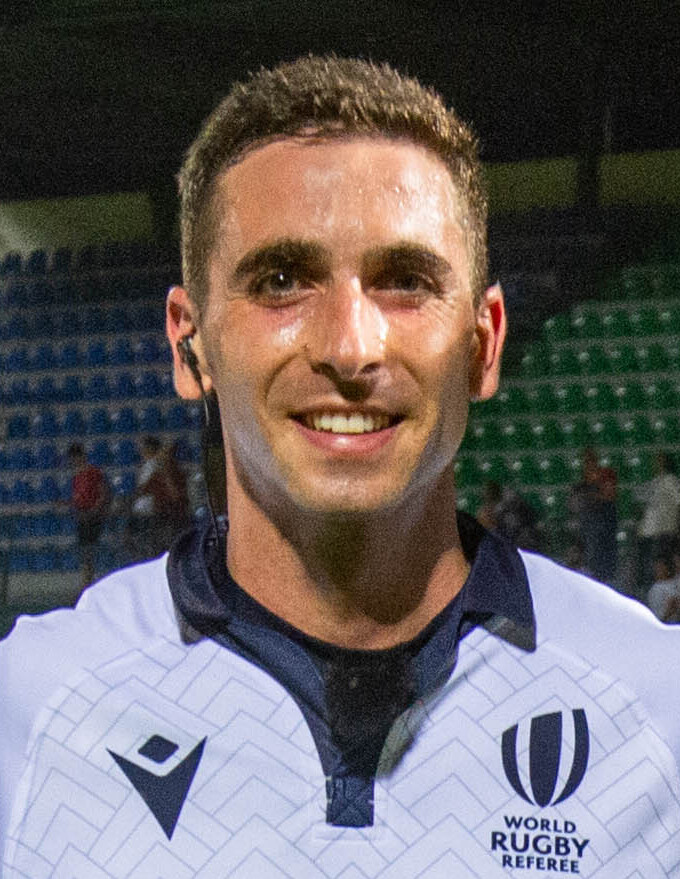
- Schneider officiating at the 2022 U20 Six Nations Summer Series
- Born: 1992 (age 33–34) Rosario, Santa Fe, Argentina

Rugby union career
Refereeing career
Years	Competition	Apps
2016-	SVNS	
2016-	World Rugby Nations Cup	
2018-	Rugby World Cup Sevens	
2018-	Summer Youth Olympics	
2016-2019	Americas Rugby Championship	
2021-	Summer Olympics	
2023-	Rugby World Cup	
2023-	Six Nations Under 20s Championship	
2023-	World Rugby U20 Championship	
2024-	Six Nations Championship	
2024-	The Rugby Championship	
2025-	Pacific Nations Cup	

Damian Schneider is an Argentine rugby union referee, who regularly officiates in the Super Rugby Americas competition, and has also officiated in New Zealand's National Provincial Championship and France's Pro D2. He is part of the Argentine Rugby Union, and officiates at both 7s and XVs.

== Career ==
By trade, Schneider is a qualified lawyer having studied law at the National University of Rosario.

He played rugby for Old Resian, but a youth injury forced him to stop playing and later began to referee locally.

In 2016, he made his elite debut on the then World Rugby Sevens Series (now SVNS), and later went onto referee within the 2016 World Rugby Nations Cup. He was also selected for the 2018 Rugby World Cup Sevens in San Francisco, and went to the 2018 Summer Youth Olympics to officiate within the Rugby Sevens event.

During this time, he started to officiate in XVs for World Rugby, becoming a regular referee in the Americas Rugby Championship between 2016 and 2019, and in 2017, he became an official referee on the World Rugby sevens series referee panel. In 2021, he was selected on the referee panel for the 2020 Summer Olympics (played in 2021) in Tokyo.

By 2022, Schneider became more involved with World Rugby appointed games, and acted as an assistant referee during the 2023 Rugby World Cup Final Qualification Tournament in Dubai. This later led to Schneider's involvement at World Rugby U20s level, seeing him referee France U20 against Wales U20 during the 2023 Six Nations Under 20s Championship.

Schneider was selected for the 2023 World Rugby U20 Championship, where he officiated three games, including the final between France U20 and Ireland U20. He later then made his Tier 1 competition debut during the 2024 Six Nations Championship, and later the 2024 Rugby Championship, acting as an assistant during the tournaments.

In June 2024, he made his World Rugby debut as the main referee when he took charge of Japan XV against the Māori All Blacks during the 2024 mid-year tests. He later refereed his first Tier 1 side when Tonga hosted Italy during the same window.

In September 2025, he refereed the 2025 World Rugby Pacific Nations Cup final between Japan and Fiji.
