= Dewald Kotze =

Canadian rugby union player

- Born: 14 June 1997 (age 29) Phalaborwa, Limpopo, South Africa
- Height: 183 cm (6 ft 0 in)
- Weight: 110 kg (243 lb; 17 st 5 lb)

Rugby union career
- Position: Hooker
- Current team: Seattle Seawolves
Senior career
Years	Team	Apps	(Points)
2022–2024	Dallas Jackals	35	(70)
2025–	Seattle Seawolves	16	(15)
- Correct as of 8 December 2025
International career
Years	Team	Apps	(Points)
2024–	Canada	13	(0)
- Correct as of 8 December 2025

Dewald Kotze (born 14 June 1997) is a professional rugby union player who currently plays as a hooker ffor the Seattle Seawolves in Major League Rugby (MLR). Born in South Africa, he represents Canada at international level.

== Early career ==
Kotze is from Kriel in South Africa, but moved to Edmonton, Alberta as a 14-year-old. Having played club rugby for Strathcona Druids he earned a call-up to the Pacific Pride in 2019.

== Professional career ==
Kotze signed for the Dallas Jackals ahead of the 2022 Major League Rugby season. He remained with the team for the 2023 and 2024 seasons, scoring five tries in a game in 2024, before the team withdrew from competition at the end of the season. He joined the Seattle Seawolves ahead of the 2025 season.

Kotze made his debut for the Canada national team in July 2024, debuting against Romania.
