= Phil Mack =

Canada international rugby union player

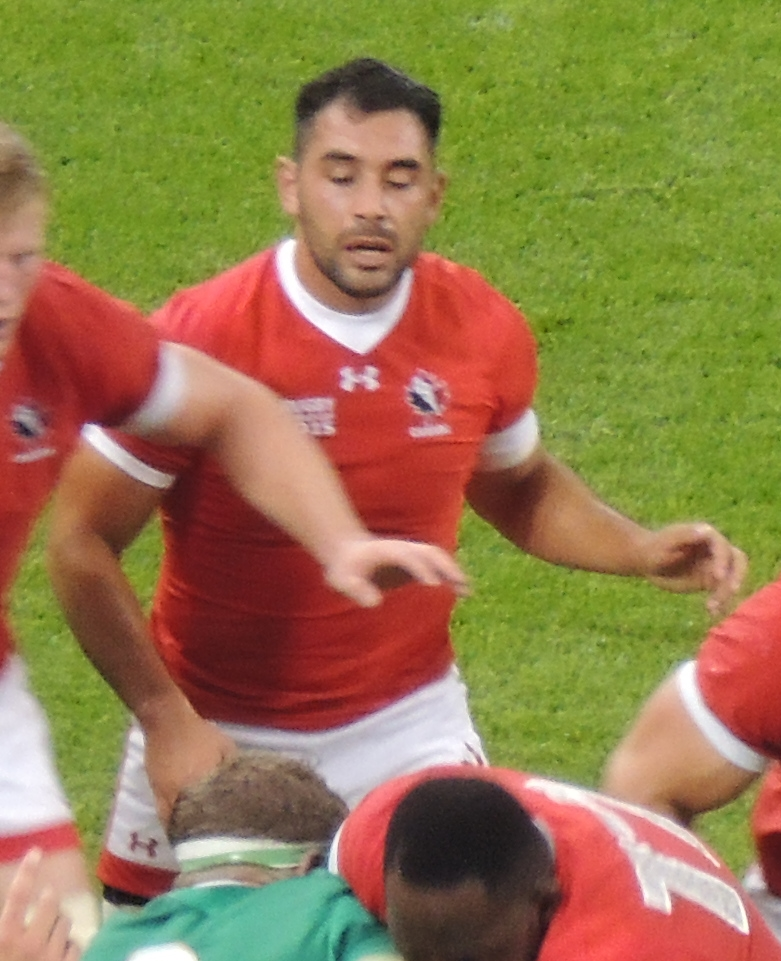
- Born: 18 September 1985 (age 41) Victoria, British Columbia
- Height: 1.63 m (5 ft 4 in)
- Weight: 81 kg (179 lb)
- School: Oak Bay Secondary School
- University: University of Victoria

Rugby union career
- Position: Scrumhalf
Senior career
Years	Team	Apps	(Points)
2013	Ospreys		
2018–20	Seattle Seawolves	25	(15)
- Correct as of 28 July 2019
Provincial / State sides
Years	Team	Apps	(Points)
2009–18	BC Bears		
International career
Years	Team	Apps	(Points)
2009–20	Canada	59	(15)
- Correct as of 17 April 2022
National sevens team
Years	Team		Comps
2006–16	Canada 7s		
Coaching career
- Years: Team
- 2018: Seattle Seawolves
- 2019–20: Seattle Seawolves (Assistant)
- 2020-21: Pacific Pride (Assistant)
- 2021-24: Pacific Pride
- 2024-: Canada Sr. Men (Attack coach)

Phil Mack (born 18 September 1985 in Victoria, British Columbia) is a rugby union scrum-half who played for the Seattle Seawolves in Major League Rugby (MLR). He was the Seawolves head coach, winning an MLR Championship Shield in 2018. He also plays for the Canada national rugby union team. He is currently an assistant coach for the Pacific Pride rugby team.

He played for Oak bay Secondary school, a historic rugby program in his home town. Phil also played for the BC Bears in Canada.

== Professional Rugby Career ==
Mack made his debut for Team Canada in 2009 and was part of the Canada squad at the 2015 Rugby World Cup.

In 2013, he signed a short-term contract with the Ospreys.

In 2018, Mack signed with the Seattle Seawolves in the inaugural season of Major League Rugby as a player/head coach. He was the starting scrum-half. His team went onto win the first ever MRL Shield trophy in the Championship against the Glendale Raptors.

In 2019, Mack continued his MLR career with the Seawolves as a player and full-time backs coach and won another Shield trophy, becoming a back-to-back champion.

In 2020, Mack played two games for Canada in the Pacific Nations Cup tournament. He started against South Africa in what would be his 59th and final cap for his country. He considered retirement but got another opportunity to coach the Seawolves again.

Although Mack started the season as an assistant coach, the season was suspended due to the COVID-19 pandemic in 2020 and he was let go from the team for next season because of budget cutbacks.

== Personal life ==
Mack is a member of the Toquaht First Nation. He created Thunder Rugby to promote rugby within the Indigenous community on Vancouver Island.

In 2020, Mack and his wife, Becky welcomed a new baby boy, Tate Joseph, into their family.
