= Callum Botchar =

Canadian rugby union player

- Born: October 3, 1997 (age 29) Ottawa, Canada
- Height: 194 cm (6 ft 4 in)
- Weight: 112 kg (247 lb)
- School: Magee Secondary School
- University: University of British Columbia

Rugby union career
- Position: Back-row
Senior career
Years	Team	Apps	(Points)
2024–	NOLA Gold		
International career
Years	Team	Apps	(Points)
2022–	Canada	2	(0)

Callum Botchar (born October 3, 1997) is a Canadian rugby union player.

Botchar, born in Ottawa, grew up in Vancouver and attended Magee Secondary School.

A back-row forward, Botchar came through the Pacific Pride academy. He had a season in New Zealand with New Plymouth Old Boys in 2023 and the following year was signed by NOLA Gold to play Major League Rugby.

Botchar was capped twice for Canada in 2022, playing matches against Belgium and Netherlands.

== See also ==
- List of Canada national rugby union players
