= Steve Meehan =

Australian rugby union coach

- Born: Stephen Meehan; 1966 (age 59–60) Queensland, Australia

Rugby union career
- Position: Head Coach of Canada
Coaching career
- Years: Team
- 2002–2006: Stade Français Paris (Ast. coach)
- 2006–2011: Bath Rugby
- 2012–2013: Western Force
- 2013–2015: Queensland Reds
- 2014: Queensland Country
- 2015–2017: Toulon
- 2017–2019: Kintetsu Liners
- 2019: Western Force
- 2020–2023: GPS Rugby
- 2024–pres.: Canada

Stephen Meehan is an Australian professional rugby union coach, who is currently serving as the head coach of Canada. With over 20 years of coaching experience, Meehan has coached in the Top 14 in France, Super Rugby in Australia, and the Top League in Japan. He led English club Bath to win the European Challenge Cup in 2008 and was the head coach of the Queensland Country team for the inaugural season of Australia's National Rugby Championship in 2014.

== Early life ==
Stephen Meehan grew up in Brisbane, the second youngest of six. He attended Marist College Ashgrove in the 1980s, along with brothers Bryan, Kevin and David. The college, which also produced John Eales and Matthew Hayden, was a hothouse of ideas on running rugby. The first team was coached by former Wallaby centre Barry Honan and his mantra – "running and passing as opposed to kicking" – was a major influence on Meehan's ideas about rugby.

Meehan didn't have much of a player career, with an injury in his first year out of school causing his shoulder to repeatedly pop out of place.

== Coaching ==
After Meehan finished playing, he turned to coaching, first at age-grade rugby at his local club, before becoming the colts head coach at GPS Rugby in 1995. In later worked closely with the Queensland Reds as an Under 19 selector, head coach of the Brisbane representative team, Combined States Under 19 backs coach, and head coach of the Brisbane Cyclone team when they became the East Coast Series champions.

=== France Top-16 and England Premiership ===
From July 2002, he moved to France to serve as Assistant Coach (Backs and Skills) at Stade Français, firstly under Nick Mallett from 2004–05 before later assisting Fabien Galthié until 2006. During his tenure, Stade reached the Final of the French Championship three years running, winning the Top 16 final in 2003 and 2004 Top 16. Stade Français were also finalists in 2005, losing to Toulouse in Edinburgh.

In June 2006, Meehan joined Bath as the new backs coach, before being temporarily promoted to head coach in August 2006. His role was made permanent in December 2006 and he went on to lead the club to their first silverware in 10 years, when Bath won the European Challenge Cup in 2008. In October 2009, Meehan signed a contract extension, to keep him at Bath until 2012. However, following the appointment of Sir Ian McGeechan as director of rugby at the club in 2010, and his subsequent assumption of responsibility for coaching, Meehan and the club reached an agreement whereby he would leave at the end of the 2010/11 season

=== Super Rugby and NRC ===
Returning to Australia, Meehan served as attack coach for the Western Force in 2013, before joining the Queensland Reds in the same role in 2014.

He also coached Queensland Country in the inaugural National Rugby Championship season in 2014, which saw the side finish in eighth place with just two wins.

He remained in Queenslands for a further season, and after two poor seasons under Richard Graham, Meehan left his post at the Reds to return to France.

=== France Top-14 and Japan Top League ===
Meehan joined Toulon as an assistant coach ahead of the 2015–16 Top 14 season, and in his debut season at the club, Toulon finished as runners-up in the French league. In his second season, Toulon once against made the final, but fell short in the final once again.

After the 2016–17 season, Meehan joined Japan Rugby League One side, Kintetsu Liners as Backs Coach. Kintetsu Liners were later relegated at the end of the 2017–18 Top League season, and despite finishing top during the 2018 Top Challenge League to contend for promotion, Kintetsu Liners failed to return to the top division after losing in the play-offs.

Meehan later left the Japanese side to return to Australia.

=== Global Rapid Rugby and QPR ===
In March 2019, Meehan returned to the Western Force as Defence Coach ahead of the 2019 Global Rapid Rugby season, where the Force won all of their games.

By the end of 2019, Meehan returned to Queensland, firstly as Director of Rugby at Brisbane Boys' College, before later being appointed as Director of Rugby for Queensland Premier Rugby club side GPS.

In 2021, he helped the side to the final of the Premier Rugby league, but lost to University of Queensland 29–12.

=== Canada ===
Meehan signed with MLR side, the Toronto Arrows, as Head Coach in October 2023, replacing Peter Smith. However, the team was disbanded due to financial reasons and did not compete in the 2024 season.

He was later appointed as Head Coach for the national team of Canada in December 2024.

Sporting positions
Preceded by (Wales) Kingsley Jones	Canada National Rugby Union Coach; 2024–	Succeeded by Incumbent
