= Kenta Fukuda =

Japanese rugby union player (born 1996)

- Born: 19 December 1996 (age 29) Ibaraki, Japan
- Height: 1.73 m (5 ft 8 in)
- Weight: 80 kg (176 lb; 12 st 8 lb)

Rugby union career
- Position: Scrum-half
- Current team: Honda Heat
Senior career
Years	Team	Apps	(Points)
2020–2024	Toyota Verblitz	34	(50)
2024–2026	Suntory Sungoliath	35	(20)
2026–	Honda Heat		
- Correct as of 28 August 2023
International career
Years	Team	Apps	(Points)
2023–	Japan	10	(5)
- Correct as of 28 August 2023

Kenta Fukuda (福田健太, Fukuda Kenta; born 19 December 1996) is a Japanese professional rugby union player who plays as a scrum-half for Japan Rugby League One club Toyota Verblitz and the Japan national team.

== Club career ==
He currently plays for Toyota Verblitz in Japan's domestic Japan Rugby League One. He was signed to the Sunwolves squad for the 2020 Super Rugby season, but did not make an appearance for the side.
