= Siôn Parry =

Canada international rugby union player

- Born: October 29, 1998 (age 28)
- Height: 183 cm (6 ft 0 in)
- Weight: 96 kg (212 lb)
- School: Whitchurch High School

Rugby union career
- Position: Flanker
Senior career
Years	Team	Apps	(Points)
2018–2019	Bedwas		
2019–	Pontypridd		
International career
Years	Team	Apps	(Points)
2023–	Canada	2	(0)

Siôn Parry (born October 29, 1998) is a Welsh Canadian rugby union player.

== Early life ==
Parry hails from Rhiwbina in the outskirts of Cardiff and was educated at Whitchurch High School.

== Rugby career ==
An openside flanker, Parry played for Bedwas in the 2017–18 season of the Welsh Premier Division, then moved on to Pontypridd. Parry, whose mother is from Ontario, was called up by Canada in 2023 after their Welsh-born coach Kingsley Jones saw a highlights video of Parry that had been sent to him by a mutual contact. He gained two caps in 2023, both against Tonga, the first off the bench and the second as part of the starting lineup.

== See also ==
- List of Canada national rugby union players
