= Ben Gunter =

Japan international rugby union player

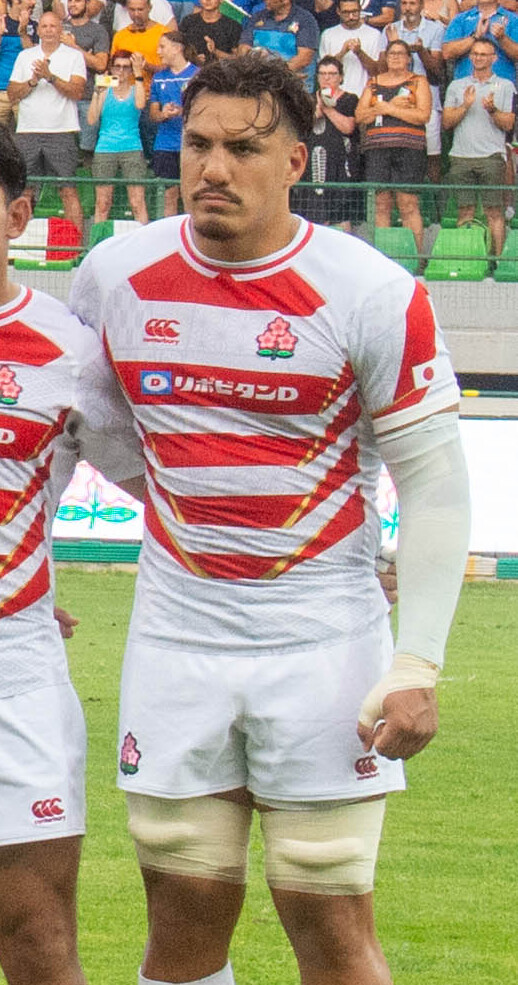
- Gunter with Japan in 2023
- Born: 24 October 1997 (age 29) Bangkok, Thailand
- Height: 1.95 m (6 ft 5 in)
- Weight: 120 kg (265 lb; 18 st 13 lb)
- School: Brisbane Boys' College

Rugby union career
- Position(s): Flanker, Number 8
- Current team: Panasonic Wild Knights
Senior career
Years	Team	Apps	(Points)
2016–	Panasonic Wild Knights	108	(85)
2019	Sunwolves	10	(0)
- Correct as of 28 August 2023
International career
Years	Team	Apps	(Points)
2021–	Japan	29	(25)
- Correct as of 28 August 2023

Ben Gunter (ベン・ガンター, Ben Gantā; born 24 October 1997) is a professional rugby union player who plays as a flanker for Japan Rugby League One club Saitama Wild Knights. Born in Thailand, he represents Japan at international level after qualifying on residency grounds.

== Early life ==
Born in Thailand, then in his youth moved to Australia and grew up in Gunnedah, New South Wales. His junior clubs were the Narrabri Blue Boars and the Gunnedah Red Devils.

== International career ==
After 3 Top League seasons for Panasonic Wild Knights, Ben Gunter received his first call-up to his adopted country.

On Saturday, 23 October 2021, Ben made his international debut for Japan against Australia at the Showa Denko Dome in Oita, starting at flanker.
