= Maliu Niuafe =

American rugby union player

- Born: 3 July 2003 (age 23) California, United States
- Height: 193 cm (6 ft 4 in)
- Weight: 127 kg (280 lb; 20 st 0 lb)

Rugby union career
- Position: Prop
- Current team: New England Free Jacks
Senior career
Years	Team	Apps	(Points)
2025	RFC Los Angeles	15	(0)
2025–	Auckland	0	(0)
2026–	New England Free Jacks		
- Correct as of 9 December 2025
International career
Years	Team	Apps	(Points)
2025–	United States	3	(0)
- Correct as of 9 December 2025

Maliu Niuafe (born 3 July 2003) is an American rugby union player, currently playing for the New England Free Jacks in Major League Rugby (MLR). His preferred position is prop.

== Early career ==
Niuafe was born in California, but raised in New Zealand. He attended Aorere College in Auckland and represented the Blues academy at U18 and U20 level. He was named in the New Zealand U20 side in 2023.

== Professional career ==
Niuafe signed his first professional contract for RFC Los Angeles ahead of the 2025 Major League Rugby season. He would make fifteen appearances in his first season, before returning to New Zealand in the off-season, where he was named in the Auckland squad for the 2025 Bunnings NPC. He signed for the New England Free Jacks ahead of the 2026 Major League Rugby season.

Niuafe made his debut for the United States national team in September 2025, debuting against Samoa.
