= Jarred Adams =

Samoan rugby union player

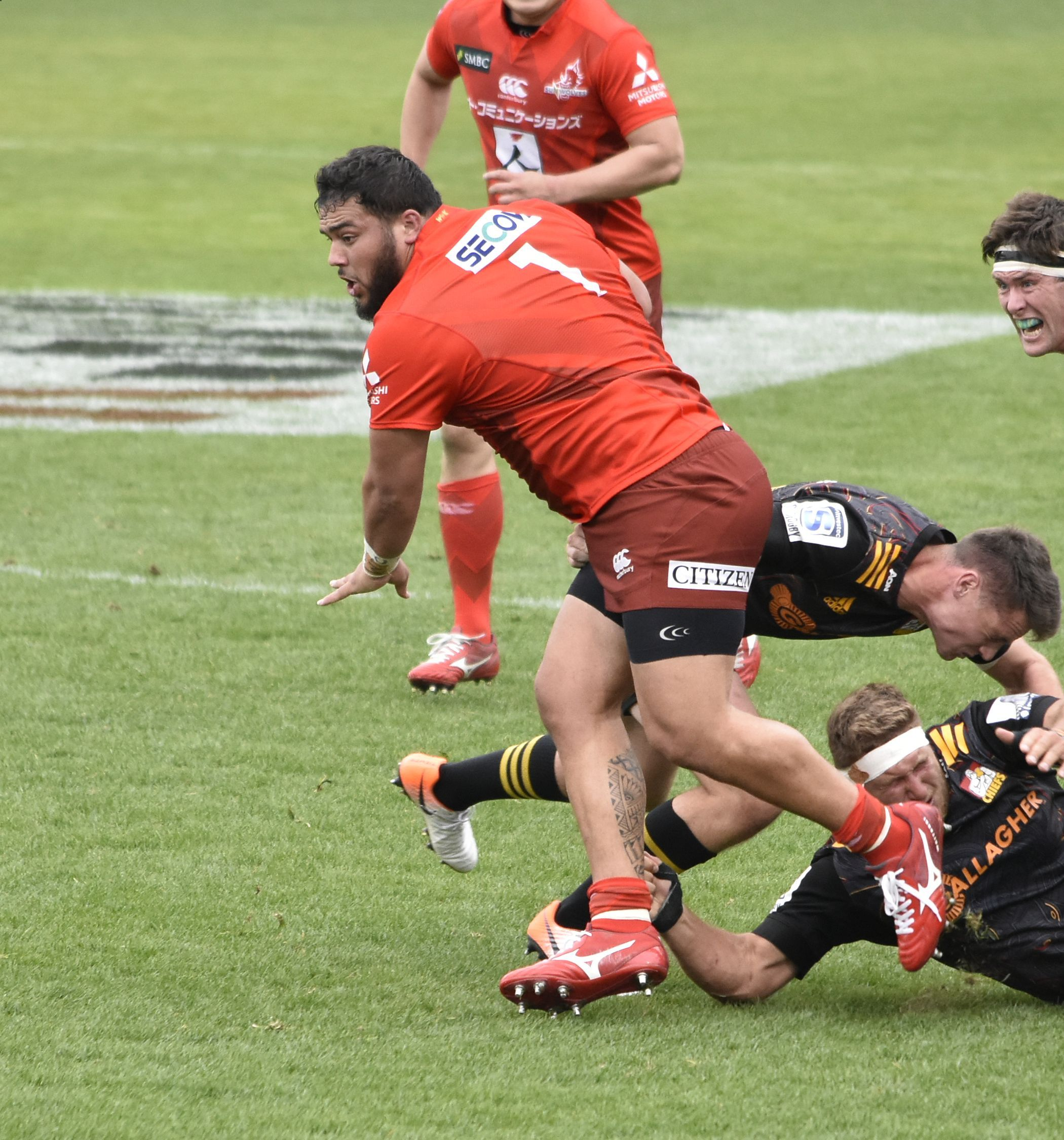
- Full name: Jarred Adams
- Born: 26 September 1996 (age 30) Auckland, New Zealand
- Height: 180 cm (5 ft 11 in)
- Weight: 122 kg (269 lb; 19 st 3 lb)
- School: Wesley College

Rugby union career
- Position: Prop
- Current team: Northland, New Orleans Gold
Senior career
Years	Team	Apps	(Points)
2016–2017	Counties Manukau	6	(0)
2018–2020	Auckland	29	(5)
2020	Sunwolves	5	(0)
2021–2022	Munakata Sanix Blues	9	(0)
2021	Manawatu	7	(10)
2022–	Northland	25	(0)
2023–	New Orleans Gold	29	(10)
- Correct as of 21 September 2024
International career
Years	Team	Apps	(Points)
2015–2016	Samoa U20	9	(5)
2025–	Samoa	6	(0)
- Correct as of 21 September 2024

Jarred J. Adams (born 26 September 1996) is a Samoan Rugby union player who plays as a prop for Northland in the Bunnings NPC. He also plays for the New Orleans Gold in Major League Rugby (MLR) in the USA.

== Career ==
Adams attended Wesley College and made his provincial debut for Counties Manukau in 2016. He then made 29 appearances for Auckland between 2018 and 2020. Adams signed with Manawatu for the 2021 Bunnings NPC season.
