= Harison Mataele =

Tongan rugby union player

- Full name: Albert Harison Mataele
- Born: 18 June 1994 (age 32) Tonga
- Height: 203 cm (6 ft 8 in)
- Weight: 117 kg (258 lb; 18 st 6 lb)

Rugby union career
- Position: Lock
- Current team: Seattle Seawolves
Senior career
Years	Team	Apps	(Points)
2024–2025	Mont-de-Marsan	8	(0)
2026–	Seattle Seawolves		
- Correct as of 10 December 2025
International career
Years	Team	Apps	(Points)
2014	Tonga U20		
2021–	Tonga	16	(0)
- Correct as of 10 December 2025

Harison Mataele (born 18 June 1994) is a Tongan rugby union player, currently playing for the Seattle Seawolves in Major League Rugby (MLR). His preferred position is lock.

== Early career ==
Mataele is from Tonga but grew up in New Zealand. He played his club rugby for Grammar TEC in Auckland while working as a personal trainer. In 2014, he represented the Tonga U20 side. He played club rugby in Australia between 2022 and 2024, playing for Manly and Eastern Suburbs.

== Professional career ==
Mataele signed his first professional contract when he joined Mont-de-Marsan during the 2024–25 Rugby Pro D2 season. After making eight appearances for the side he returned to New Zealand. In December 2025, he signed for the Seattle Seawolves ahead of the 2026 Major League Rugby season.

Mataele made his debut for the Tonga national team in July 2021, debuting against New Zealand. He has gone on to win a further fifteen caps for Tonga since.
