= Rob Valetini =

Australia international rugby union player

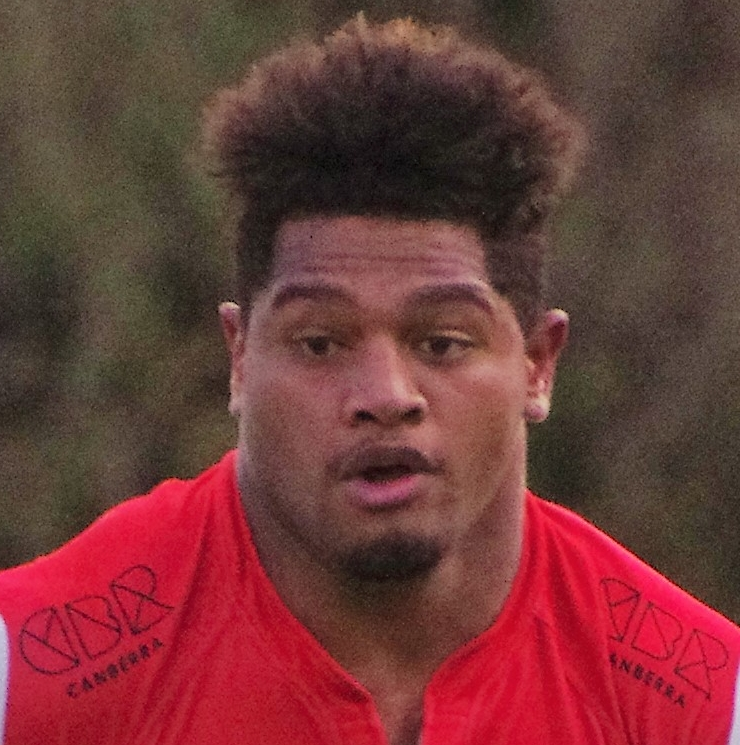
- Born: Robert Valetini; 3 September 1998 (age 28) Melbourne, Victoria, Australia
- Height: 193 cm (6 ft 4 in)
- Weight: 113 kg (249 lb; 17 st 11 lb)
- School: Westall Secondary College
- Notable relative: Kemu Valetini (brother)

Rugby union career
- Position(s): Number 8, Flanker
- Current team: Brumbies
Senior career
Years	Team	Apps	(Points)
2016	Melbourne Rising	2	(0)
2017–2019	Canberra Vikings	21	(50)
2018–	Brumbies	110	(110)
- Correct as of 5 June 2026
International career
Years	Team	Apps	(Points)
2017	Australia U20	5	(0)
2019–	Australia	71	(25)
- Correct as of 17 October 2026

Robert Valetini (born 3 September 1998) is an Australian rugby union player who plays as a back row forward for the Brumbies in Super Rugby and for Australia.

== Early life ==
The son of Fijian parents – father Manueli Valetini and mother Finau Valetini – the Melbourne-born Robert Valetini attended Westall Secondary College. He played representative rugby for Victorian state teams at under-16, under-18 and under-20 levels. A broken leg in his last year at school meant he missed a chance at selection for the 2016 Australian Schoolboys team, but he was called up to play for the Melbourne Rising in the National Rugby Championship (NRC) later that season.

== Professional career ==
While still at school, Valetini signed an Extended Playing Squad contract with the Brumbies for the 2017 season. His parents told him the move to Canberra would give him valuable life experience and he was just the second Australian rugby forward to sign a Super Rugby contract while still a schoolboy.

Valetini did not play much rugby in the early part of his first year due to hand and ankle injuries, but he joined the Australia Under-20 team to play in the 2017 World Championship in Georgia. In 2017, Valetini signed a two-year full-time Super Rugby contract with the Brumbies until 2019, before playing NRC for the Canberra Vikings in 2017.

Valetini made his Brumbies debut in February 2018 against the Sunwolves.

Valetini made his international debut for Australia at Bankwest Stadium in Sydney against Samoa in September 2019.

Valetini was heavily involved with the Wallabies in 2020 and 2021, appearing against New Zealand, South Africa and Argentina.

In August 2023, Valetini was named in the 33-man Wallabies squad for the 2023 Rugby World Cup in France.

Valetini was awarded the annual John Eales Medal in 2023 and 2024.
