= Siegfried Fisiʻihoi =

Tonga international rugby union player

Siegfried Fisi'ihoi
- Born: 8 June 1987 (age 39) Vavaʻu, Tonga
- Height: 1.84 m (6 ft 0 in)
- Weight: 125 kg (276 lb; 19 st 10 lb)
- School: Rotorua Boys' High School

Rugby union career
- Position: Prop
- Current team: Pau
Senior career
Years	Team	Apps	(Points)
2012–2013	East Coast	16	(45)
2014–2017	Bay of Plenty	32	(20)
2016–2017	Chiefs	25	(0)
2017–2019	Stade Français	37	(15)
2019–	Pau	66	(20)
- Correct as of 28 August 2023
International career
Years	Team	Apps	(Points)
2017–	Tonga	23	(15)
- Correct as of 28 August 2023

Siegfried Fisi'ihoi (born 8 June 1987) is a Tongan professional rugby union player who plays as a prop for Top 14 club Pau and the Tonga national team.

== Early life ==
Born in Tonga, Fisi'ihoi moved to New Zealand in his teens and attended Rotorua Boys' High School where he initially played his rugby as a number eight. He stayed in the Bay of Plenty after school and was playing for their development side in 2010 when a minor liquor ban breach flagged up that he had overstayed his visa and he was subsequently deported back to Tonga. He was able to return to New Zealand the following year and played club rugby for Rotoiti while also having a spell playing for East Coast in the Heartland Championship.

== Club career ==
=== Bay of Plenty ===
Something of a late bloomer, Fisi'ihoi's first experience of senior provincial rugby came at the age of 27 when he made the Bay of Plenty squad for the 2014 ITM Cup. Playing largely off the bench in his debut season, he scored 2 tries in 7 appearances as the Steamers finished bottom of the Championship log. 2015 saw him play in 10 of the Steamers 11 Championship matches as they enjoyed a much better campaign, finishing in 3rd place before being eliminated by Hawke's Bay at the semi-final stage. He again made 10 appearances in 2016 to help the Bay to 4th place in the Championship and another exit at the semi-final stage, this time at the hands of Otago.

=== Chiefs ===
Solid domestic performances for the Bay of Plenty in 2014 and 2015 saw him named in the Chiefs wider training group ahead of the 2016 Super Rugby season. Injuries to fellow props Nepo Laulala and Pauliasi Manu meant that he got plenty of game time during his first year in Hamilton. He made 9 substitute appearances during his debut campaign as his new side reached the competition's semi-finals before going down to New Zealand rivals and eventual winners, the Hurricanes. As a reward for his displays throughout the season, he was promoted to the Chiefs senior squad for 2017.

== Career statistics ==
=== Club summary ===
Year	Team	Played	Start	Sub	Tries	Cons	Pens	Drop	Points	Yel	Red
2016	Chiefs	9	0	9	0	0	0	0	0	0	0
Career		9	0	9	0	0	0	0	0	0	0

as of 11 December 2016
