= Erich Storti =

American rugby union player

- Born: 14 October 2000 (age 26) Concord, California, United States
- Height: 183 cm (6 ft 0 in)
- Weight: 91 kg (201 lb; 14 st 5 lb)

Rugby union career
- Position: Centre / Fullback
Senior career
Years	Team	Apps	(Points)
2025–2026	Anthem Carolina	12	(10)
- Correct as of 8 December 2025
International career
Years	Team	Apps	(Points)
2024–	United States	8	(0)
- Correct as of 8 December 2025

Erich Storti (born 14 October 2000) is an American rugby union player who played for the Anthem Carolina in Major League Rugby (MLR). His preferred position is centre or fullback.

== Early career ==
Storti is from Concord, California and attended Saint Mary's College of California. His father Marty has previously attended the college, along with his brother, Mario.

Erich and Mario grew up playing various sports. Although younger, Mario consistently had the edge on Erich. Standing 6 inches taller than Erich and with a faster top speed, Mario helped Erich compete from an early age.

== Professional career ==
Storti was the first overall pick in the 2024 MLR Draft for Anthem Carolina. He made his debut for the side in Round 1 of the 2025 Major League Rugby season against New Orleans Gold.

Storti made his debut for the United States national team in November 2024 prior to his professional debut, debuting against Portugal.
