= Taniela Rakuro =

Fijian rugby union player

- Born: 28 May 2000 (age 26) Malomalo, Nadroga, Fiji

Rugby union career
- Position: Wing
- Current team: Drua
Senior career
Years	Team	Apps	(Points)
2023–	Drua	23	(45)
2025	Taranaki	1	(25)
- Correct as of 19 July 2025

Taniela Rakuro (born 28 May, 2000) is a Fijian rugby union player who plays for the Drua and Taranaki in the NPC as an injury replacement for Kini Naholo. His preferred position is wing.

== Early career ==
Rakuro is from Malomalo in Nadroga. He plays for Nadroga in the Skipper Cup.

== Professional career ==
Rakuro originally signed for the Drua as a development player ahead of the 2023 Super Rugby Pacific season. He was promoted to the main squad on a short-term deal ahead of the season in February 2023 and made his debut in Round 1 of the season against Moana Pasifika, scoring the winning try on debut, on what was the first occasion that he had left Fiji.
