= Ethan McVeigh =

American rugby union player

- Born: 14 December 1999 (age 26) San Diego, California, United States
- Height: 176 cm (5 ft 9 in)
- Weight: 90 kg (198 lb; 14 st 2 lb)

Rugby union career
- Position: Scrum-half
- Current team: New England Free Jacks
Senior career
Years	Team	Apps	(Points)
2021	San Diego Legion	9	(10)
2023	American Raptors		
2024–2025	Old Glory DC	29	(10)
2026–	New England Free Jacks		
- Correct as of 8 December 2025
International career
Years	Team	Apps	(Points)
2024–	United States	7	(0)
- Correct as of 8 December 2025

Ethan McVeigh (born 14 December 1999) is an American rugby union player, currently playing for the New England Free Jacks in Major League Rugby (MLR). His preferred position is scrum-half.

== Early career ==
McVeigh is from San Diego and attended St. Augustine High School before attending Cardiff Metropolitan University. He represented the USA U20s in 2019.

== Professional career ==
McVeigh signed for the San Diego Legion during the 2021 Major League Rugby season while still a student at Cardiff Met. Having completed his studies, he returned to America to sign for the American Raptors ahead of the 2023 Super Rugby Americas season. He re-joined the MLR ahead of the 2024 Major League Rugby season, signing for Old Glory DC where he played for the next two seasons. He signed for the New England Free Jacks ahead of the 2026 season.

McVeigh made his debut for the United States national team in July 2024, debuting against Scotland.
