= Te Papapa Onehunga RFC =

Coordinates: 36.912327245°S 174.797896620°E

(New Zealand) Te Papapa Onehunga Rugby Football & Sports Club
- Union: Auckland Rugby Football Union
- Founded: 1944; 82 years ago
- Location: Onehunga, Auckland
- Ground: Fergusson Domain
- President: John Matahiki
- League: Auckland Premier

Official website
- www.tp.org.nz

Te Papapa Onehunga Rugby Football & Sports Club is a rugby union club based in Auckland, New Zealand. The club was established in 1944 and is affiliated with the Auckland Rugby Football Union. In addition to rugby union, the club is also active in netball, touch rugby, squash, darts, indoor bowls and cricket.
