= Solomone Tukuafu =

New Zealand rugby union player

- Born: New Zealand

Rugby union career
- Position: Prop
- Current team: Chiefs
Senior career
Years	Team	Apps	(Points)
2022–	Chiefs	1	(0)
- Correct as of 19 March 2022

Solomone Tukuafu is a New Zealand rugby union player who plays for the Chiefs in Super Rugby. His playing position is prop. He was named in the Chiefs squad for Round 5 of the 2022 Super Rugby Pacific season.
