= Kemu Valetini =

Fijian rugby union player (born 1994)

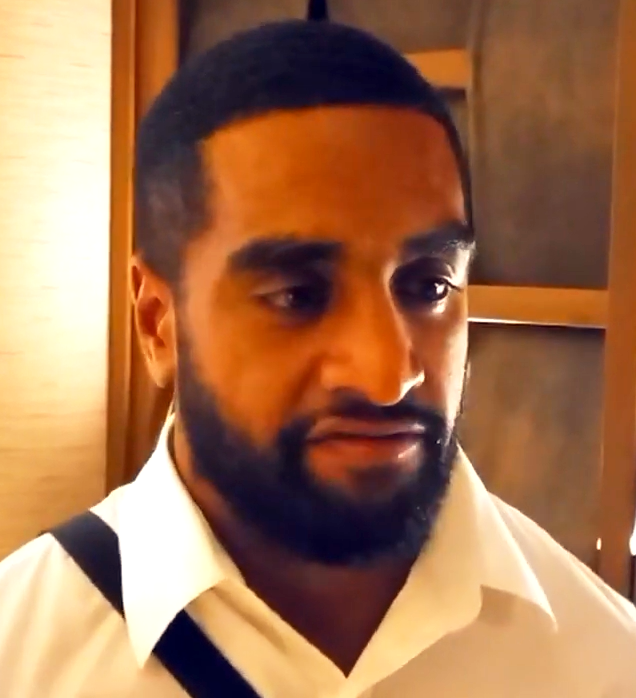
- Valetini in 2023
- Born: 26 August 1994 (age 32) Melbourne, Australia
- Height: 185 cm (6 ft 1 in)
- Weight: 110 kg (243 lb; 17 st 5 lb)
- Notable relative: Rob Valetini (brother)

Rugby union career
- Position: Fly-half / Centre
- Current team: Drua
Senior career
Years	Team	Apps	(Points)
2018	Melbourne Rising		
2019–2020	Valladolid RAC	13	(87)
2023–	Drua	26	(35)
- Correct as of 19 March 2023
International career
Years	Team	Apps	(Points)
2023-	Fiji	6	(10)

Kemueli Valetini (born 26 August 1994) is a Fijian rugby union player, currently playing for the Drua. His preferred position is fly-half or centre.

== Early career ==
Valetini grew up in Melbourne, and played in the Dewar Shield for the Harlequins club. He is the brother of Australia international Rob Valetini.

== Professional career ==
Valetini began his professional career in Melbourne with the Melbourne Rising, and trained with the full Rebels side. Following a knee injury, he moved to Spain to represent Valladolid RAC but returned due to the COVID-19 pandemic and another knee injury. In 2022, he joined Manly, where he impressed. He was picked up by the Drua on a short-term contract during the 2023 Super Rugby Pacific season, and made his debut in Round 3 of the season against the Crusaders, where he kicked the winning penalty to seal the victory.
