= Pacific Pride (rugby union) =

Canadian rugby union club, based in Langford, BC

- Full name: Rugby Canada National Development Academy
- Union: Rugby Canada
- Founded: 2019
- Ground: Starlight Stadium
- Coach: (Canada) Phil Mack
- League(s): British Columbia Premier League; Coastal Cup

The Rugby Canada National Development Academy or Pacific Pride is a Canadian rugby union team that is based in Langford, British Columbia. The team acts as the high-performance development academy for Rugby Canada.

== History ==
Originally active between 1996 and 2005, the Pacific Pride program was developed as a U-23 academy to support the development of young players in Canada. David Clark was the inaugural head coach of the program. The original incarnation of the Pacific Pride program was run by Rugby Canada and the Commonwealth Centre for Sport Development.

The Pride was resurrected in 2019 as a high-performance development academy intended for players between the ages of 18 and 24.

== Personnel ==
=== Current squad ===
The 2021-22 Canadian Development Academy squad.

Backs
Player	Position	Year
Caleb Barker	Scrum-half	1
Sam Reimer	Scrum-half	1
Sean Snyman	Scrum-half	1
Kai Khan	Fly-half	1
Max Stewart	Fly-half	1
Justin Taylor	Fly-half	1
Taylor de Souza	Centre	1
Dawson Fatoric	Centre	1
Sion Griffiths	Centre	2
Isaac Olson	Centre	2
D'Shawn Bowen	Wing	3
Oliver Mackenzie	Wing	1
Jack Morris	Wing	1
Anton Ngongo	Wing	3
Kal Sager	Wing	1
Gabriel Smith	Wing	1
Mark Balaski	Full-back	1

Forwards
Player	Position	Year
Peter Ingoldsby	Hooker	1
Owen Lavado	Hooker	1
Tyler Wong	Hooker	2
Chris Atkinson	Prop	2
Daniel Cooper	Prop	1
Aaron Clarke	Prop	1
William den Ouden	Prop	1
Tyler Matchem	Prop	1
Kyle Steeves	Prop	1
Callum Botchar	Lock	1
Alistair Bruce	Lock	1
Thomas Davidson	Lock	3
Callum O'Neill	Lock	1
Conor Turner	Lock	1
Noah Flesch	Back row	1
Ethan Fryer	Back row	1
Matt Klimchuk	Back row	1
Zephyr Melnyk	Back row	1
Cody Nhanala	Back row	3
Zack Raymond	Back row	1
Taitusi Vikilani	Back row	3

=== Coaching staff ===
- Head Coach: Phil Mack

=== Former head coaches ===
- (Canada) Jamie Cudmore (2019-2021)
