= 2021 Major League Rugby season =

- Countries: United States (11 teams); Canada (1 team)
- Date: March 20 – August 1
- Champions: LA Giltinis (1st title)
- Runners-up: Rugby ATL
- Matches played: 99
- Highest attendance: 7,389; LA Giltinis vs Rugby ATL (August 1, 2021)
- Tries scored: 679 (average 6.9 per match)
- Top point scorer: Dan Hollinshead (111)
- Top try scorer: D. T. H. van der Merwe (11)

Official website
- majorleague.rugby

The 2021 Major League Rugby season was the fourth season of Major League Rugby, the professional rugby union competition sanctioned by USA Rugby. The regular season began on March 20, 2021.

One team made their debut in 2021: the LA Giltinis. The season also marks the first team departure in the league's history, with the Colorado Raptors. MLR history was made when United States Rugby referee Kat Roche became the first woman in a lead officiating role in a match (Seattle Seawolves vs Houston SaberCats on July 15).

== Teams and format ==
Locations of teams in Major League Rugby
Western Conference Eastern Conference

Conference	Club	Metro area	Stadium	Capacity	Coach	Captain
Western Conference	Austin Gilgronis	Austin, Texas	Bold Stadium	5,000	(New Zealand) Sam Harris	(United States) Bryce Campbell
Western Conference	Houston SaberCats	Houston, Texas	Aveva Stadium	4,000	(Australia) Paul Healy	(Australia) Luke Beauchamp (Australia) De Wet Roos
Western Conference	LA Giltinis	Los Angeles, California	Los Angeles Memorial Coliseum	77,500	(Australia) Darren Coleman	(Australia) Dave Dennis
Western Conference	San Diego Legion	San Diego, California; Las Vegas, Nevada (Note: Team has temporarily relocated for the 2021 season.); Los Angeles, California; Chula Vista, California	Torero Stadium; James Regional Sports Park; Dignity Health Track & Facility; Chula Vista Elite Athlete Training Center	6,000	(Scotland) Scott Murray (United States) Zack Test	(South Africa) Joe Pietersen
Western Conference	Seattle Seawolves	Seattle, Washington	Starfire Stadium (Note: Starfire Stadium is in the Seattle suburb of Tukwila, Washington.)	4,500	(Namibia) Kees Lensing (to April 23, 2021) (United States) Pate Tuilevuka (from April 23, 2021, to May 27, 2021) (Ireland) Allen Clarke (from May 27, 2021)	(United States) Riekert Hattingh
Western Conference	Utah Warriors	Salt Lake City, Utah	Zions Bank Stadium	5,000	(United States) Shawn Pittman	(Australia) Bailey Wilson
Eastern Conference	New England Free Jacks	Boston, Massachusetts	Union Point Sports Complex; Veterans Memorial Stadium	2,000; 5,000	(New Zealand) Ryan Martin	(Canada) Josh Larsen
Eastern Conference	New Orleans Gold	New Orleans, Louisiana	Gold Mine	10,000	(Australia) Nate Osborne	(Canada) Kyle Baillie
Eastern Conference	Old Glory DC	Washington, D.C.	Segra Field	5,000	(New Zealand) Andrew Douglas	(Scotland) Mungo Mason (United States) Thretton Palamo
Eastern Conference	Rugby United New York	New York, New York; Jersey City, New Jersey	MCU Park; Cochrane Stadium	7,000; 4,000	(New Zealand) Marty Veale	(United States) Dylan Fawsitt
Eastern Conference	Rugby ATL	Atlanta, Georgia	Lupo Family Field (Note: Lupo Family Field is in the Atlanta suburb of Marietta, Georgia.)	2,500	(United States) Scott Lawrence	(Canada) Matt Heaton (South Africa) Ryan Nell
Eastern Conference	Toronto Arrows	Toronto, Ontario; Atlanta, Georgia (Note: Team has temporarily relocated for the 2021 season.)	Lupo Family Field	2,500	(Canada) Chris Silverthorn	(Canada) Ben LeSage (Canada) Lucas Rumball

== Trial laws ==
Several new rules were introduced for the 2021 season, some of which are not practiced in other rugby leagues:

- Kick Clock: Kickers will now have sixty seconds as opposed to ninety seconds for both conversions and penalties.
- Seven points will be automatically awarded for any try scored directly under the posts and kicking a conversion will no longer be necessary.
- Referees will work with stricter protocols that will limit the number of scrums to two per incident – the original plus one reset for a collapse, penalty, or freekick.
- The offside line will be the feed line/channel of the scrum to allow for unimpeded access to the ball at the back of the scrum for the attacking team.
- No longer will a red card mean a team plays a man down for the remainder of the match. Under the new law a red card would lead to a player being sent off and the team goes down to 14 players for 20 minutes. After 20 minutes, the player can be replaced with another player on the bench.

== Regular season ==
The regular season consists of eighteen weeks, with each team playing 16 matches, beginning on March 20, 2021.

=== Standings ===
Season Standings
Western Conference
Pos	Team	P	W	D	L	PF	PA	PD	TF	TA	TB	LB	Pts
1	LA Giltinis (CH)	16	12	0	4	545	305	+240	80	37	11	4	63
2	Utah Warriors (SF)	16	10	0	6	506	464	+42	72	65	13	4	57
3	Austin Gilgronis	16	9	0	7	389	317	+72	51	43	7	4	47
4	San Diego Legion	16	6	0	10	430	464	-34	61	63	9	5	38
5	Seattle Seawolves	16	4	0	12	343	461	-118	46	63	4	6	26
6	Houston SaberCats	16	2	0	14	274	550	-276	31	80	3	2	13
Eastern Conference
Pos	Team	P	W	D	L	PF	PA	PD	TF	TA	TB	LB	Pts
1	Rugby ATL (RU)	16	11	0	5	420	321	+99	58	41	9	4	57
2	Rugby United New York (SF)	16	10	0	6	448	419	+29	60	59	10	3	53
3	New Orleans Gold	16	10	1	5	375	378	-3	49	47	7	2	51
4	New England Free Jacks	16	10	0	6	382	351	+31	52	50	7	1	48
5	Old Glory DC	16	6	1	9	409	490	-81	56	65	8	5	39
6	Toronto Arrows	16	5	0	11	411	412	-1	53	56	5	5	30
If teams are level at any stage, tiebreaker criteria are as follows (coin tosses or draw of lots will be used if those below fail): 1. number of matches won 2. the difference between points for and points against 3. the number of tries scored 4. the most points scored 5. the difference between tries for and tries against 6. the fewest red cards received 7. the fewest yellow cards received
Green background indicates teams in position for the Playoffs (CH) Champions. (RU) Runners-up. (SF) Losing semi-finalists. Last Updated: July 18, 2021

=== Matches ===
Home \ Away	AUS	HOU	LA	NE	NO	DC	ATL	NY	SD	SEA	TOR	UTA
Austin Gilgronis		26–0	3–17				17–15	16–9	11–14	42–15	47–21	28–30
Houston SaberCats	9–28		35–48	0–32		13–21			34–32	30–24	10–19	5–24
LA Giltinis	31–17	52–5		42–27	20–21	47–17			45–17	57–26		38–27
NE Free Jacks	22–18				9–17	38–34	22-19	22–6		25–21	14–12	22–21
New Orleans Gold	15–18	28–26		30–29		26–26	7–8	51–28			22–14	29–24
Old Glory DC	29–25			35–22	21–25		30–23	10–46	38–29	22–18	19–40	
Rugby ATL		33–15	17–12	33–18	38–28	32–12		17–27	41–22		21–14	
Rugby United NY		54–19	18–16	29–19	32–35	38–34	31–24				12–53	28–29
San Diego Legion	14–33	39–11	13–19	17–33	43–17			29–36		34–21		31–29
Seattle Seawolves	31–36	40–21	14–29		30–6		6–25	21–23	21–15			28–29
Toronto Arrows			16–43	17–28	12–18	34–28	29–33	24–31	30–40	52–7		
Utah Warriors	45–24	50–43	34–29			34–33	31–41		45–41	15–20	39–24	

Updated to match(es) played on July 17, 2021
Colors: Blue: home team win; Yellow: draw; Red: away team win.

=== Scheduled matches ===
==== Week 1 (March 20–21) ====
March 20	(2 BP) San Diego Legion	29–36	Rugby United NY (1 BP)	James Regional Sports Park
15:00 PDT	Try: Siaosi Mahoni 4'; Psalm Wooching 11'; Cronan Gleeson 33'; Ryan Matyas 66'; Con: Dylan Audsley (2/3) 5', 34'; Automatic conversion 11'; Pen: Dylan Audsley (1/1) 48'	Report	Try: Hanco Germishuys 6'; Faʻasui Fuatai 18'; Will Leonard (2) 20', 55'; Dylan Fawsitt (2) 62', 69'; Con: Dan Hollinshead (3/6) 7', 19', 63'; Cards: James Rochford (yellow card) 39'	Attendance: 0 Referee: Scott Green (USAR) Assistants: Austin Reed (USAR) & Jacob Gonzalez (USAR) Man of the Match: Dylan Fawsitt (Rugby United NY)

March 20	(1 BP) LA Giltinis	42–27	New England Free Jacks	Los Angeles Memorial Coliseum
15:30 PDT	Try: D. T. H. van der Merwe (2) 5', 9'; Angus Cottrell 20'; Mahe Vailanu 45'; Adam Ashley-Cooper 58'; Pago Haini 73'; Con: Matt Giteau (5/5) 6', 10', 21', 46', 59'; Luke Carty (1/1) 74'; Cards: Christian Poidevin (yellow card) 23'	Report	Try: Joe Johnston 15'; Beaudein Waaka 37'; Vili Tolutaʻu 78'; Con: Harrison Boyle (2/2) 16', 79'; Beaudein Waaka (1/1) 38'; Pen: Beaudein Waaka 23'; John Poland; Cards: Aleki Morris-Lome (yellow card) 26'; Mitch Wilson (yellow card) 30'; John Poland (red card) 52'	Referee: Derek Summers (USAR) Assistants: Marquise Goodwin (USAR) & Andrew Stockton (USAR) Man of the Match: D. T. H. van der Merwe (LA Giltinis)

March 20	Rugby ATL	21–14	Toronto Arrows (1 BP)	Life University Running Eagles Stadium
19:00 EDT	Try: Chance Wenglewski 6'; Johan Momsen 22'; Neethling Gericke 38'; Con: Bautista Ezcurra (3/3) 7', 23', 39'; Pen: Bautista Ezcurra (0/1)	Report	Try: Jack McRogers 2'; Tomás de la Vega 11'; Con: Automatic conversion 2'; Andrew Ferguson (1/1) 12'; Pen: Andrew Ferguson (0/1)	Referee: Mike Lash (NZR) Assistants: Cisco Lopez (USAR) & Dave Edwards (USAR) Man of the Match:

March 20	Houston SaberCats	30–24	Seattle Seawolves (1 BP)	AVEVA Stadium
19:00 CDT	Try: Zach Pangelinan 36'; Paula Balekana 56'; Matías Freyre 67'; Con: Automatic Conversion 36', 56'; Sam Windsor (1/1) 68'; Pen: Sam Windsor (3/3) 13', 23', 75'	Report	Try: Les Soloai 12'; Rhyno Herbst 38'; Ross Neal 58'; Con: Ben Cima (1/1) 12'; Mathew Turner (2/2) 39', 59'; Pen: Mathew Turner (1/1) 43'	Referee: Jack Gohl (RA) Assistants: Joey Swatzell (USAR) & Jarrod Ford (USAR) Man of the Match: Matías Freyre (Houston SaberCats)

March 20	(2 BP) Austin Gilgronis	28–30	Utah Warriors (1 BP)	Bold Stadium
19:00 CDT	Try: Hugh Roach 20'; Moe Abdelmonem 55'; Penalty try 69'; Paddy Ryan 77'; Con: Mack Mason (3/3) 21', 56', 78'; Automatic conversion 69'; Pen: Mack Mason (0/1)	Report	Try: Michael Baska 27'; Lance Williams 32'; Sama Malolo 52'; Jurie van Vuuren 65'; Con: Automatic conversion 27'; Hagen Schulte (1/3) 53'; Pen: Hagen Schulte (2/2) 5', 71'; Cards: Sama Malolo (yellow card) 19'; Lance Williams (yellow card) 38'; Jurie van Vuuren (yellow card) 69'	Referee: Moe Chaudhry (RC) Assistants: Kat Roche (USAR) & Butch Neuenschwander (USAR) Man of the Match:

March 21	(1 BP) NOLA Gold	26–26	Old Glory DC	The Gold Mine
15:00 CDT	Try: Eric Howard 8'; Holden Yungert 40'; Carl Meyer 53'; Juan Cappiello 76'; Con: Carl Meyer (2/3) 40', 77'; Automatic conversion 53'	Report	Try: Danny Tusitala (2) 25', 45'; Con: Automatic conversion 25'; Jason Robertson (1/1) 46'; Pen: Jason Robertson (4/4) 3', 10', 34', 69'	Referee: Luke Rogan (USAR) Assistants: Allen Alongi (USAR) & Rob Halcomb (USAR) Man of the Match: Jamason Faʻanana-Schultz (Old Glory DC)

==== Week 2 (March 27–28) ====
March 27	(1 BP) NOLA Gold	51–28	Rugby United NY (1 BP)	The Gold Mine
15:00 CDT	Try: Joeli Tikoisuva (3) 2', 45', 58'; Penalty try 17'; Cam Dolan 21'; Damian Stevens 51'; Con: Carl Meyer (2/2) 7', 40'; Automatic conversion 17', 46'; Damian Stevens (2/2) 52', 59'; Pen: Carl Meyer (2/2) 7', 40'; Damian Stevens (1/1) 69'; Cards: Joeli Tikoisuva (yellow card) 16'; Moni Tonga’uiha (yellow card) 32'; Nikola Bursic (yellow card) 55'	Report	Try: Ben Foden 13'; Faʻasui Fuatai 24'; Samu Tawake 32'; Benjamín Bonasso 48'; Con: Dan Hollinshead (3/3) 14', 25', 33'; Automatic conversion 48'; Cards: Quinn Ngawati (yellow card) 17'	Referee: Moe Chaudhry (RC) Assistants: Allen Alongi (USAR) & Saade Bou-Mikael (USAR) Man of the Match:

March 27	Old Glory DC	30–23	Rugby ATL (1 BP)	Segra Field
17:00 EDT	Try: Callum Gibbins 50'; Danny Tusitala 53'; Tevita Naqali 73'; Con: Danny Tusitala (3/3) 51', 54', 74'; Pen: Danny Tusitala (3/3) 9', 19'. 59'; Cards: Stan South (yellow card) 58'	Report	Try: Rowan Gouws 29'; Mark O'Keeffe 75'; Con: Robbie Petzer (2/2) 30', 76'; Pen: Robbie Petzer (3/4) 12', 22', 34'; Cards: Conor Keys (yellow card) 50'	Referee: Derek Summers (USAR) Assistants: Mike O'Brien (USAR) & Gavin McCandless (USAR) Man of the Match: Mike Sosene-Feagai (Old Glory DC)

March 27	Houston SaberCats	0–32	New England Free Jacks (1 BP)	AVEVA Stadium
19:00 CDT	Pen: Sam Windsor (0/2); Cards: Charlie Connolly (yellow card) 53'	Report	Try: Pieter Jansen 1'; Dougie Fife (2) 48', 63'; Justin Johnson 54'; Con: John Poland (2/3) 49', 55'; Automatic conversion 63'; Pen: John Poland (1/1) 58'; Mitch Wilson (1/1) 70'; Cards: Harrison Boyle (yellow card) 15'; Josh Larsen (yellow card) 17'; Kyle Ciquera (yellow card) 72'	Referee: Luke Rogan (USAR) Assistants: Joey Swatzell (USAR) & Jarrod Ford (USAR) Man of the Match: Dougie Fife (New England Free Jacks)

March 27	(1 BP) Utah Warriors	39–24	Toronto Arrows	Zions Bank Stadium
19:00 MDT	Try: Sama Malolo (2) 31', 45'; Lance Williams 38'; Mike Te'o 62'; Fraser Hurst 70'; Con: Hagen Schulte (4/5) 32', 39', 46', 63'; Pen: Hagen Schulte (2/2) 9', 16'; Drop: Hagen Schulte (0/1); Cards: Josh Whippy (red card) 73'; Joseph Mano (yellow card) 77'	Report	Try: Tayler Adams 52'; Jason Higgins 54'; Manuel Diana 79'; Con: Tayler Adams (3/3) 53', 55', 79'; Pen: Tayler Adams (1/2) 23'	Referee: Jack Gohl (RA) Assistants: Kahlil Harrison (USAR) & Kage Green (USAR) Man of the Match: Aston Fortuin (Utah Warriors)

March 28	(1 BP) Austin Gilgronis	11–14	San Diego Legion	Bold Stadium
17:00 PDT	Try: Jamie Mackintosh 56'; Con: Mack Mason (0/1); Pen: Mack Mason (2/2) 9', 53'	Report	Try: Travis Larsen 63'; Carlo de Nysschen 73'; Con: Joe Pietersen (1/1) 64'; Automatic conversion 73'; Cards: Travis Larsen (yellow card) 77'	Referee: Mike Lash (NZR) Assistants: Kat Roche (USAR) & Butch Neuenschwander (USAR) Man of the Match:

March 28	(1 BP) LA Giltinis	57–26	Seattle Seawolves (1 BP)	Los Angeles Memorial Coliseum
17:30 PDT	Try: Charlie Abel 2'; Luke White 5'; Harrison Goddard (3) 12', 39', 47'; Adam Ashley-Cooper 28'; Ryan James 34'; Angus Cottrell (2) 49', 73'; Con: Matt Giteau (5/7) 6', 13', 29', 40', 48'; Luke Carty (1/2) 74'; Cards: Mahe Vailanu (yellow card) 18'; Angus Cottrell (yellow card) 62'	Report	Try: Riekert Hattingh 19'; James Malcolm (3) 53', 58', 62'; Con: Automatic conversion 19'; Ben Cima (2/3) 59', 63'	Referee: Lex Weiner (USAR) Assistants: Marquise Goodwin (USAR) & Andrew Stockton (USAR) Man of the Match: Harrison Goddard (LA Giltinis)

==== Week 3 (April 3) ====
April 3	New England Free Jacks	22–21	Utah Warriors (1 BP)	Union Point Sports Complex
16:30 EDT	Try: Joe Johnston 38'; Dougie Fife 43'; Con: Beaudein Waaka (0/2); Pen: Beaudein Waaka (4) 26', 40', 51', 58'; Cards: Ronan McCusker (yellow card) 65'	Report	Try: Josh Whippy 30'; Penalty try 65'; Mike Te'o 80'; Con: Hagen Schulte (2/2) 31', 80'; Automatic conversion 65'; Cards: Jurie van Vuuren (yellow card) 25'	Referee: Mike Lash (NZR) Assistants: Amelia Luciano (USAR) & Pearce Mara (USAR) Man of the Match: Joe Johnston (New England Free Jacks)

April 3	Old Glory DC	19–40	Toronto Arrows (1 BP)	Segra Field
17:00 EDT	Try: Thretton Palamo 39'; Jamason Faʻanana-Schultz 58'; James King 78'; Con: Danny Tusitala (2/3) 39', 79'; Cards: Stan South (yellow card) 29'	Report	Try: Tyler Rowland 10'; Manuel Diana 12'; Ben LeSage 41'; Gastón Mieres 65'; Jason Higgins 67'; Con: Tayler Adams (2/4) 13', 68'; Automatic conversion 41'; Pen: Tayler Adams (1/2) 18'; Will Kelly (1/1) 80'; Drop: Tayler Adams (1/1) 40'	Attendance: 700; Referee: Luke Rogan (USAR) Assistants: Mike O'Brien (USAR) & Gavin McCandless (USAR) Man of the Match:

April 3	(1 BP) Rugby ATL	41–22	San Diego Legion	Lupo Family Field
19:00 EDT	Try: Mark O'Keeffe (2) 5', 32'; Martini Talapusi 41'; Jason Damm 68'; Con: Robbie Petzer (3/4) 6', 42', 69'; Pen: Robbie Petzer (5/5) 28', 40', 50', 64', 73'	Report	Try: Bjorn Basson 2'; Psalm Wooching 20'; Dylan Audsley 78'; Con: Joe Pietersen (1/2) 21'; Automatic conversion 78'; Pen: Joe Pietersen (1/1) 14'	Attendance: 750; Referee: Jack Gohl (RA) Assistants: Cisco Lopez (USAR) & Dave Edwards (USAR) Man of the Match: Rory van Vugt (Rugby ATL)

April 3	(1 BP) Austin Gilgronis	26–0	Houston SaberCats	Bold Stadium
19:00 CDT	Try: Mason Koch (2) 12', 27'; Jamie Mackintosh 31'; Rodrick Waters 77'; Con: Mack Mason (3/4) 28', 31', 78'; Pen: Mack Mason (0/1); Cards: Will Magie (yellow card) 71'	Report	Pen: Sam Windsor (0/1); Cards: Diego Magno (yellow card) 26'; Nicolás Solveyra (yellow card) 38'; Zachary Short (yellow card) 76'	Referee: Derek Summers (USAR) Assistants: Kat Roche (USAR) & Butch Neuenschwander (USAR) Man of the Match: Mason Koch 2nd annual "Texas Cup" match winners: Austin Gilgronis (2–0)

Bye/s: LA Giltinis, NOLA Gold, Rugby United NY, Seattle Seawolves

==== Week 4 (April 10–11) ====
April 10	Toronto Arrows	16–43	LA Giltinis (1 BP)	The Gold Mine
12:30 CDT	Try: Manuel Montero 63'; Con: Tayler Adams (1/1) 64'; Pen: Tayler Adams (3/3) 2', 28', 33'; Cards: Gaston Cortes (yellow card) 37'	Report	Try: Corey Thomas 8'; Adam Ashe 39'; John Ryberg 41'; Angus Cottrell 45'; Harrison Goddard 59'; Harry McNulty 75'; Con: Matt Giteau (4/5) 9', 40', 42', 46'; Luke Burton (1/1) 76'; Pen: Matt Giteau (1/1) 5'	Referee: Lex Weiner (USAR) Assistants: Allen Alongi (USAR) & Saade Bou-Mikael (USAR) Man of the Match:

April 10	(1 BP) NOLA Gold	15–18	Austin Gilgronis	The Gold Mine
15:30 CDT	Try: Julián Domínguez 62'; Joeli Tikoisuva 72'; Con: Carl Meyer (1/2) 63'; Pen: Carl Meyer (1/1) 30'	Report	Try: Pele Cowley 5'; Rodrick Waters 79'; Con: Mack Mason (1/2) 6'; Pen: Mack Mason (2/2) 15', 58'	Referee: Jack Gohl (RA) Assistants: Allen Alongi (USAR) & Saade Bou-Mikael (USAR) Man of the Match: Mack Mason (Austin Gilgronis)

April 10	(1 BP) Houston SaberCats	34–32	San Diego Legion (2 BP)	AVEVA Stadium
19:00 CDT	Try: Veramu Dikidikilati 15'; Penalty try 21'; Paula Balekana 33'; Matías Freyre 44'; Con: Sam Windsor (3/3) 16', 34', 45'; Automatic conversion 21'; Pen: Sam Windsor (2/6) 40', 69'; Drop: Taylor Howden (0/1); Sam Windsor (0/1)	Report	Try: Dylan Audsley 13'; Bjorn Basson 17'; Joe Pietersen 23'; Peter Malcolm 59'; Cam Clark 80'; Con: Joe Pietersen (2/5) 14', 24'; Pen: Joe Pietersen (1/1) 42'; Cards: Cecil Afrika (yellow card) 21'	Referee: Moe Chaudhry (RC) Assistants: Joey Swatzell (USAR) & Jarrod Ford (USAR) Man of the Match: Nick Boyer (Houston SaberCats)

April 10	(1 BP) Utah Warriors	15–20	Seattle Seawolves	Zions Bank Stadium
19:00 MDT	Try: Veremalua Vugakoto 21'; Cliven Loubser 56'; Con: Automatic conversion 21'; Hagen Schulte (0/1); Pen: Hagen Schulte (1/1) 64'	Report	Try: Andrew Durutalo 14'; Sitiveni Tamaivena 31'; Aaron Matthews 67'; Con: Kieran Joyce (1/3) 15'; Pen: Kieran Joyce (1/2) 47'; Cards: Djustice Sears-Duru (yellow card) 19'	Referee: Derek Summers (USAR) Assistants: Kage Green (USAR) & Niku Kurger (USAR) Man of the Match: Devereaux Ferris (Seattle Seawolves)

April 11	Rugby ATL	17–27	Rugby United NY	Lupo Family Field
15:00 EDT	Try: Marko Janse van Rensburg 22'; Ross Deacon 75'; Rory van Vugt 79'; Con: Robbie Petzer (1/3) 23'; Pen: Robbie Petzer (0/1); Drop: Bautista Ezcurra (0/1); Cards: Marno Redelinghuys (yellow card) 45'; Bautista Ezcurra (yellow card) 59'	Report	Try: Quinn Ngawati 12'; Dan Hollinshead 17'; Samu Tawake 48'; Con: Dan Hollinshead (1/1); Automatic conversion (2) 17', 48'; Pen: Dan Hollinshead (2/3) 3', 58'; Cards: Andrew Ellis (yellow card) 45'	Referee: Mike Lash (NZR) Assistants: Cisco Lopez (USAR) & Dave Edwards (USAR) Man of the Match: Dan Hollinshead (RUNY)

Bye/s: New England Free Jacks, Old Glory DC

==== Week 5 (April 17–18) ====
April 17	(1 BP) Toronto Arrows	52–7	Seattle Seawolves	Lupo Family Field
10:30 EDT	Try: Joaquín Tuculet 3'; Ben LeSage 9'; Ross Braude 28'; Pat Parfrey 45'; Jack McRogers 56'; Jason Higgins 61'; Gaston Cortes 74'; Con: Tayler Adams (5/5) 4', 10', 57', 62', 75'; Automatic conversion (2) 28', 45'; Pen: Tayler Adams (1/1) 16'	Report	Try: Mike Shepherd 53'; Con: Ben Cima (1/1) 54'	Referee: JP Doyle (RFU) Assistants: Henrique Platais (CBRu) & Cisco Lopez (USAR) Man of the Match:

April 17	(1 BP) NOLA Gold	30–29	New England Free Jacks (2 BP)	The Gold Mine
16:00 EDT	Try: Moni Tonga’uiha 20'; Julián Domínguez 34'; JP du Plessis 46'; John Sullivan 69'; Con: Carl Meyer (1/3) 35'; Automatic conversion 69'; Pen: Carl Meyer (2/2) 13', 27'	Report	Try: Mitch Wilson 24'; Dougie Fife (2) 31', 65'; John Poland 65'; Harry Barlow 72'; Con: Beaudein Waaka (2/5) 32', 44'	Referee: Scott Green (USAR) Assistants: Allen Alongi (USAR) & Saade Bou-Mikael (USAR) Man of the Match: Cam Dolan (NOLA Gold)

April 17	(1 BP) San Diego Legion	31–29	Utah Warriors (2 BP)	Dignity Health Track & Facility
19:00 EDT	Try: Cam Clark 1'; Ryan Matyas 13'; Peter Malcolm 25'; Jasa Veremalua (2) 67', 74'; Con: Automatic conversion 1'; Santiago González Iglesias (1/2) 14'; Cecil Afrika (1/2) 75'	Report	Try: Mike Te'o 7'; Tyler Fisher 23'; Hagen Schulte 57'; Bailey Wilson 80'; Con: Hagen Schulte (2/3) 24', 80'; Automatic conversion 57'; Pen: Hagen Schulte (1/2) 47'	Referee: Jack Gohl (RA) Assistants: Austin Reed (USAR) & Jacob Gonzalez (USAR) Man of the Match: Tevita Tameilau (San Diego Legion)

April 17	(1 BP) Houston SaberCats	33–48	LA Giltinis (1 BP)	AVEVA Stadium
20:00 EDT	Try: Robbie Povey (2) 10', 41'; Taylor Howden 23'; Nick Boyer 52'; Con: Sam Windsor (2/4) 42', 53'; Pen: Sam Windsor (3/4) 21', 31', 35'	Report	Try: Harrison Goddard (2) 2', 32'; D. T. H. van der Merwe 15'; Nathan Den Hoedt 26'; Angus Cottrell 36'; Mahe Vailanu (2) 45', 65'; Lindsey Stevens 75'; Con: Luke Carty (2/5) 16', 33'; Matt Giteau (0/1); Luke Burton (2/2) 66', 76'	Referee: Luke Rogan (USAR) Assistants: Jarrod Ford (USAR) & Mitch Damm (USAR) Man of the Match: Angus Cottrell (LA Giltinis)

April 17	Austin Gilgronis	17–15	Rugby ATL (1 BP)	Bold Stadium
20:00 EDT	Try: Isaac Ross 19'; Conner Mooneyham 74'; Con: Mack Mason (2/2) 20', 75'; Pen: Mack Mason (1/1) 80'	Report	Try: Marko Janse van Rensburg 35'; Mark O'Keeffe 56'; Con: Robbie Petzer (1/2) 57'; Pen: Robbie Petzer (1/2) 78'	Referee: Moe Chaudhry (RC) Assistants: Joey Swatzell (USAR) & Butch Neuenschwander (USAR) Man of the Match: Conner Mooneyham (Austin Gilgronis)

April 18	(1 BP) Rugby United NY	38–34	Old Glory DC (2 BP)	Cochrane Stadium
14:30 EDT	Try: Andrew Ellis 5'; Troy Lockyear 20'; Dylan Fawsitt 34'; Dan Hollinshead 48'; Quinn Ngawati 61'; Con: Dan Hollinshead (4/4) 6', 21', 35', 62'; Automatic conversion 48'; Pen: Dan Hollinshead (1/1) 40'; Cards: Benjamín Bonasso (yellow card) 67'	Report	Try: Sam Cusano 14'; Callum Gibbins 18'; D'Montae Noble 30'; Renata Roberts-Tenana 50'; Josh Brown 67'; Con: Jason Robertson (2/4) 19', 68'; Automatic conversion 50'; Pen: Jason Robertson (1/1) 44'	Referee: Mike Lash (NZR) Assistants: Lex Weiner (USAR) & Miles McIvor (USAR) Man of the Match: Troy Lockyear (Rugby United NY)

==== Week 6 (April 24–25) ====
April 24	(1 BP) Rugby ATL	38–28	NOLA Gold (1 BP)	Lupo Family Field
17:30 EDT	Try: Jeremy Misailegalu 2'; Rory van Vugt 4'; Bautista Ezcurra 13'; Adriaan Carelse 54'; Marno Redelinghuys 62'; Con: Bautista Ezcurra (0/1); Automatic conversion 4'; Adriaan Carelse (1/3) 63'; Pen: Adriaan Carelse (3/3) 24', 29', 76'	Report	Try: Dino Waldren (2) 11', 19'; Pat O'Toole 27'; Cam Dolan 44'; Con: Automatic conversion 11'; Carl Meyer (3/3) 20', 28', 45'	Referee: JP Doyle (RFU) Assistants: Henrique Platais (CBRu) & Cisco Lopez (USAR) Man of the Match: Adriaan Carelse (Rugby ATL)

April 24	(1 BP) LA Giltinis	45–17	San Diego Legion	Los Angeles Memorial Coliseum
18:00 PDT	Try: John Ryberg 1'; Angus Cottrell 3'; Christian Poidevin 5'; D. T. H. van der Merwe (2) 21', 40'; JP Smith 25'; Sean McNulty 45'; Con: Luke Burton (4/6) 2', 4', 6', 22'; Automatic conversion 45'; Cards: Luke Burton (yellow card) 50'	Report	Try: Tevita Tameilau 13'; Ryan Matyas 34'; Bjorn Basson 68'; Con: Santiago González Iglesias (1/3) 14'; Cards: Save Totovosau (yellow card) 17'	Referee: Scott Green (USAR) Assistants: Marquise Goodwin (USAR) & Andrew Stockton (USAR) Man of the Match: Angus Cottrell (LA Giltinis)

April 24	(1 BP) Utah Warriors	50–43	Houston SaberCats (2 BP)	Zions Bank Stadium
19:00 MDT	Try: Joseph Mano 6'; Mike Te'o (2) 11', 18'; Mika Kruse (2) 24', 43'; Michael Baska 35'; Thomas Tu’avao 60'; Con: Hagen Schulte (6/7) 7', 12', 19', 36', 44', 61'; Pen: Hagen Schulte (1/2) 68'	Report	Try: Sam Windsor 1'; Nick Boyer 4'; Robbie Povey (3) 30', 46', 73'; Adriaan Booysen 57'; Con: Sam Windsor (4/5) 31', 47', 58', 74'; Automatic conversion 4'; Pen: Sam Windsor (1/1) 14'	Referee: Federico Anselmi (UAR) Assistants: Kahlil Harrison (USAR) & Niku Kruger (USAR) Man of the Match: Mike Te'o (Utah Warriors)

April 25	Rugby United NY	12–53	Toronto Arrows (1 BP)	Cochrane Stadium
14:00 EDT	Try: Luke Hume 3'; Andrew Ellis 50'; Con: Dan Hollinshead (1/2) 51'	Report	Try: Joaquín Tuculet 15'; Manuel Montero (3) 21', 37', 75'; Mike Sheppard 45'; Gastón Mieres 54'; Jason Higgins 77'; Con: Automatic conversion 15'; Tayler Adams (5/6) 38', 46', 55', 76', 78'; Pen: Tayler Adams (2/4) 67', 72'	Referee: Derek Summers (USAR) Assistants: Miles McIvor (USAR) Man of the Match: Ben LeSage (Toronto Arrows)

April 25	(1 BP) Old Glory DC	35–22	New England Free Jacks	Segra Field
15:30 EDT	Try: Danny Tusitala 27'; Mike Dabulas 31'; Mike Sosene-Feagai 39'; Osea Kolinisau 80'; Con: Jason Robertson (3/3) 28', 32', 40'; Pen: Jason Robertson (3/3) 12', 22', 61'; Cards: Stan South (yellow card) 51'	Report	Try: Dougie Fife (2) 8', 58'; Harry Barlow 66'; Con: Beaudein Waaka (1/1) 9'; Pen: Beaudein Waaka; Cards: Ronan McCusker (yellow card) 25'	Referee: Lex Weiner (USAR) Assistants: Mike O'Brien (USAR) & Gavin McCandless (USAR) Man of the Match:

April 25	(1 BP) Austin Gilgronis	42–15	Seattle Seawolves	Bold Stadium
18:00 CDT	Try: Isaac Ross (2) 23', 48'; Zinzan Elan-Puttick (2) 39', 42'; Christian Ostberg 75'; Ned Hodson 80', +2'; Con: Mack Mason (2/4) 24', 49'; Kurt Morath (1/2) 76'; Pen: Mack Mason (2/2) 14', 36'; Kurt Morath (0/1); Cards: Robbie Coetzee (yellow card) 8'	Report	Try: Ross Neal 16'; Riekert Hattingh 71'; Con: Kieran Joyce (1/1) 17'; Juan Pablo Aguirre (0/1); Pen: Kieran Joyce (1/1) 28'	Referee: Luke Rogan (USAR) Assistants: Kat Roche (USAR) & Butch Neuenschwander (USAR) Man of the Match: Zinzan Elan-Puttick (Austin Gilgronis)

==== Week 7 (May 1–2) ====
May 1	San Diego Legion	17–33	New England Free Jacks (1 BP)	Los Angeles Memorial Coliseum
14:00 PDT	Try: Jasa Veremalua 52'; Ryan Matyas 65'; Bjorn Basson 80'; Con: Cecil Afrika (1/1) 53'; Patrick Madden (0/1); Tai Enosa (0/1); Cards: Travis Larsen (yellow card) 56'	Report	Try: Dougie Fife (2) 6', 63'; John Poland (2) 13', 15'; Kensuke Hatakeyama 69'; Con: Automatic conversion (2) 6', 13'; Beaudein Waaka (2/3) 16', 64'; Cards: Vili Tolutaʻu (yellow card) 33'	Referee: Moe Chaudhry (RC) Assistants: Austin Reed (USAR) & Jacob Gonzalez (USAR) Man of the Match: Psalm Wooching (San Diego Legion)

May 1	LA Giltinis (1 BP)	47–17	Old Glory DC	Los Angeles Memorial Coliseum
18:00 PDT	Try: Langilangi Haupeakui 11'; Adam Ashley-Cooper 15'; D. T. H. van der Merwe (2) 27', 47'; Matt Giteau 32'; JP Smith 36'; Angus Cottrell 60'; Con: Matt Giteau (6/5) 12', 16', 33', 37', 48'; Automatic conversion 60'	Report	Try: Osea Kolinisau 71'; D'Montae Noble 73'; Con: Jason Robertson (2/2) 71', 74'; Pen: Jason Robertson (1/1) 5'	Referee: JP Doyle (RFU) Assistants: Marquise Goodwin (USAR) & Andrew Stockton (USAR) Man of the Match: JP Smith (LA Giltinis)

May 2	NOLA Gold	22–14	Toronto Arrows	Gold Mine
11:00 CDT	Try: Cam Dolan 57'; Julián Domínguez (2) 61', 75'; Con: Damian Stevens (2/3) 58', 76'; Pen: Damian Stevens (1/2) 68'; Cards: Hanno Dirksen (yellow card) 77'	Report	Try: Manuel Montero (2) 7', 32'; Con: Tayler Adams (2/2) 8', 33'; Pen: Tayler Adams (0/2); Cards: Tayler Adams (yellow card) 68'	Referee: Federico Anselmi (UAR) Assistants: Allen Alongi (USAR) & Rob Halcomb (USAR) Man of the Match: Julián Domínguez (NOLA Gold)

May 2	(1 BP) Seattle Seawolves	21–23	Rugby United NY	Starfire Stadium
17:00 PDT	Try: Ross Neal (2) 6', 31'; James Malcolm 38'; Con: Mathew Turner (1/1) 7'; Kieran Joyce (2/2) 32', 39'; Pen: Kieran Joyce (0/2); Mathew Turner (0/1)	Report	Try: Dylan Fawsitt 47'; Hanco Germishuys 72'; Con: Dan Hollinshead (2/2) 48', 73'; Pen: Dan Hollinshead (3/3) 16', 24', 76'	Referee: Jack Gohl (RA) Assistants: Denny Russell (USAR) & Brett Johnson (USAR) Man of the Match: Dylan Fawsitt & Hanco Germishuys (Rugby United NY)

Bye/s: Austin Gilgronis, Houston SaberCats, Rugby ATL, Utah Warriors

==== Week 8 (May 8–9) ====
May 8	(1 BP) New England Free Jacks	22–18	Austin Gilgronis (1 BP)	Union Point Sports Complex
16:00 EDT	Try: Harry Barlow (2) 38', 68'; Erich de Jager 51'; Wian Conradie 58'; Con: Beaudein Waaka (1/4) 52'; Pen: Beaudein Waaka (0/1); Cards: Quentin Newcomer (yellow card) 46'	Report	Try: Conner Mooneyham 10'; Pele Cowley 47'; Con: Mack Mason (1/2) 48'; Pen: Mack Mason (2/2) 15', 31'; Cards: Sebastian de Chaves (yellow card) 57'; Conner Mooneyham (yellow card) 72'; Paddy Ryan (yellow card) 75'	Referee: Luke Rogan (USAR) Assistants: Amelia Luciano (USAR) & Nick Tricarico (USAR) Man of the Match:

May 8	(1 BP) NOLA Gold	28–26	Houston SaberCats (1 BP)	Gold Mine
15:00 CDT	Try: Pat O'Toole (2) 6', 20'; Penalty try 24'; Nikola Bursic 72'; Con: Timothée Guillimin (3/3) 7', 21', 73'; Automatic conversion 24'	Report	Try: Nick Boyer 39'; Paula Balekana (2) 61', 69'; Con: Sam Windsor (1/3) 62'; Pen: Sam Windsor (3/3) 11', 17', 27'; Cards: Nika Khatiashvili (yellow card) 24'	Referee: Moe Chaudhry (RC) Assistants: Allen Alongi (USAR) & Rob Halcomb (USAR) Man of the Match: Timothée Guillimin (NOLA Gold)

May 8	(2 BP) Toronto Arrows	29–33	Rugby ATL (1 BP)	Lupo Family Field
19:00 EDT	Try: Mike Sheppard 7'; Ben LeSage 9'; Gastón Mieres 53'; Tomás de la Vega 63'; Con: Tayler Adams (3/4) 8', 10', 64'; Pen: Tayler Adams (1/1) 75'; Cards: Andrew Quattrin (yellow card) 3'	Report	Try: Marko Janse van Rensburg (2) 4', 43'; Jason Damm 31'; Mark O'Keeffe 36'; Ross Deacon 80+2'; Con: Adriaan Carelse (4/5) 32', 37', 44', 80+3'	Referee: JP Doyle (RFU) Assistants: Cisco Lopez (USAR) & Dave Edwards (USAR) Man of the Match: 1st annual "Fire and Ice Cup" match winners: Rugby ATL (1–0)

May 8	(1 BP) Utah Warriors	34–33	Old Glory DC (2 BP)	Zions Bank Stadium
20:00 MDT	Try: Jared Whippy 12'; Aston Fortuin 29'; Penalty try 56'; Mika Kruse 80+2'; Con: Hagen Schulte (3/3) 13', 30', 80+3'; Automatic conversion 56'; Pen: Hagen Schulte (2/2) 11', 67'	Report	Try: Doug Fraser 16'; Jamason Faʻanana-Schultz 33'; Renata Roberts-Tenana 49'; Callum Gibbins 73'; Con: Jason Robertson (1/3) 34'; Automatic conversion 49'; Pen: Jason Robertson (2/2) 9', 69'; Drop: Jason Robertson (1/1) 20'; Cards: Apisai Naikatini (yellow card) 55'	Referee: Scott Green (USAR) Assistants: Kahlil Harrison (USAR) & Niku Kruger (USAR) Man of the Match: Aston Fortuin (Utah Warriors)

May 9	Rugby United NY	18–16	LA Giltinis (1 BP)	Cochrane Stadium
13:00 EDT	Pen: Dan Hollinshead (6/7) 14', 37', 42', 51', 60', 74'; Cards: Samu Tawake (yellow card) 70'	Report	Try: D. T. H. van der Merwe 27'; Con: Luke Burton (1/1) 28'; Pen: Luke Burton (3/3) 8', 53', 71'; Cards: Adam Ashe (yellow card) 73'	Referee: Mike Lash (NZR) Assistants: Lex Weiner (USAR) & Miles McIvor (USAR) Man of the Match: Dan Hollinshead (Rugby United NY) 1st annual "Champagne Cup" match winners: Rugby United NY (1–0)

May 9	Seattle Seawolves	21–15	San Diego Legion (1 BP)	Starfire Stadium
17:00 PDT	Try: Ross Neal 5'; Sitiveni Tamaivena 58'; Con: AJ Alatimu (1/2) 6'; Pen: AJ Alatimu (3/3) 20', 62', 66'	Report	Try: Cole Zarcone 40'; Bjorn Basson 54'; Con: Carlo de Nysschen (1/2) 55'; Pen: Carlo de Nysschen (1/3) 49'	Referee: Federico Anselmi (UAR) Assistants: Brett Johnson (USAR) & Ryan Curtis (USAR) Man of the Match:

==== Week 9 (May 15–16) ====
May 15	(1 BP) San Diego Legion	43–17	NOLA Gold	Chula Vista Elite Athlete Training Center
13:00 PDT	Try: Bjorn Basson 16'; Ethan McVeigh 30'; Cecil Afrika (2) 40', 54'; Joe Pietersen 44'; Carlo de Nysschen 74'; Con: Joe Pietersen (3/4) 17', 31', 45'; Carlo de Nysschen (1/1) 55'; Ryan Matyas (1/1) 75'; Pen: Joe Pietersen (1/1) 20'; Cards: Fakaʻosi Pifeleti (yellow card) 50'; Siaosi Mahoni (yellow card) 59'	Report	Try: Andrew Guerra 13'; Julián Domínguez 60'; Kevin Sullivan 68'; Con: Automatic conversion 13'; Timothée Guillimin (0/2); Cards: Hanno Dirksen (yellow card) 28'; Eric Howard (yellow card) 40'	Referee: Jack Gohl (RA) Assistants: Austin Reed (USAR) & Jacob Gonzalez (USAR) Man of the Match:

May 15	Houston SaberCats	10–19	Toronto Arrows	Aveva Stadium
19:00 CDT	Try: Cecil Garber 75'; Con: Sam Windsor (1/1) 76'; Pen: Sam Windsor (1/1) 40'; Cards: Nick Boyer (yellow card) 35'	Report	Try: Manuel Montero 21'; Tomás de la Vega 37'; Manuel Diana 64'; Con: Will Kelly (2/3) 38', 65'	Referee: Scott Green (USAR) Assistants: Kat Roche (USAR) & Butch Neuenschwander (USAR) Man of the Match:

May 15	(1 BP) Rugby ATL	33–18	New England Free Jacks	Lupo Family Field
20:00 EDT	Try: Marko Janse van Rensburg 3'; Te Rangatira Waitokia 20'; Adriaan Carelse 29'; Ross Deacon 71'; Mark O'Keeffe 79'; Con: Adriaan Carelse (2) 20', 71'; Cards: Mark O'Keeffe (yellow card) 80'	Report	Try: Harry Barlow 31'; John Poland 52'; Con: Beaudein Waaka 32'; Pen: Beaudein Waaka (2) 12', 23'; Cards: Vili Tolutaʻu (yellow card) 70'; Jackson Thiebes (yellow card) 70'	Referee: Mike Lash (NZR) Man of the Match:

May 15	Austin Gilgronis	16–9	Rugby United NY (1 BP)	Bold Stadium
19:00 CDT	Try: Hugh Roach 28'; Con: Mack Mason (1/1) 29'; Pen: Mack Mason (3/3) 4', 40', 51'		Pen: Dan Hollinshead (3/3) 2', 8', 12'; Cards: Will Leonard (yellow card) 19'	Referee: Federico Anselmi (UAR) Assistants: Joey Swatzell (USAR) & Jarrod Ford (USAR) Man of the Match: Hugh Roach (Austin Gilgronis)

May 15	(1 BP) LA Giltinis	38–27	Utah Warriors (1 BP)	SoFi Stadium
19:00 PDT	Try: Harrison Goddard (2) 2', 26'; Angus Cottrell (2) 40', 72'; Corey Thomas 51'; Con: Matt Giteau (3/3) 3', 40', 52'; Automatic conversion 26'; Luke Burton (1/1) 73'; Pen: Matt Giteau (1/1) 17'	Report	Try: Sama Malolo 6'; James Vaifale 58'; Jurie van Vuuren 70'; Lance Williams 80+2'; Con: Hagen Schulte (0/2); Calvin Whiting (1/1) 71'; Mike Te'o (1/1) 80+3'; Pen: Hagen Schulte (1/2) 11'	Attendance: 4,880; Referee: Derek Summers (USAR) Assistants: Marquise Goodwin (USAR) & Andrew Stockton (USAR) Man of the Match: Angus Cottrell (LA Giltinis)

May 16	(1 BP) Old Glory DC	22–18	Seattle Seawolves (1 BP)	Segra Field
12:00 EDT	Try: Renata Roberts-Tenana 17'; Doug Fraser 24'; Thretton Palamo 40'; Mike Sosene-Feagai 54'; Con: Jason Robertson (1/4) 40'	Report	Try: Kieran Joyce 9'; Ross Neal 32'; Con: AJ Alatimu (1/2) 10'; Pen: AJ Alatimu (2/2) 23', 28'	Referee: JP Doyle (RFU) Assistants: Mike O'Brien (USAR) & Gavin McCandless (USAR) Man of the Match: Renata Roberts-Tenana (Old Glory DC)

==== Week 10 (May 19–23) ====
May 19	Austin Gilgronis	3–17	LA Giltinis	Bold Stadium
20:00 CDT	Pen: Mack Mason (1/1) 37'	Report	Try: Lindsey Stevens 16'; John Ryberg 48'; Con: Matt Giteau (2/2) 17', 49'; Pen: Matt Giteau (1/1) 79'	Referee: JP Doyle (RFU) Assistants: Kat Roche (USAR) & Butch Neuenschwander (USAR) Man of the Match: Angus Cottrell (LA Giltinis)

May 22	(1 BP) NOLA Gold	29–24	Utah Warriors (1 BP)	The Gold Mine
19:00 CDT	Try: Julián Domínguez 5'; Pat O'Toole (2) 18', 47'; Kyle Rogers 59'; Con: Holden Yungert (2) 19', 48'; Damian Stevens 60'; Pen: Holden Yungert 40'	Report	Try: Michael Baska 21'; Mike Te'o 35'; Veremalua Vugakoto 74'; Con: Calvin Whiting 22'; Pen: Calvin Whiting 6'; Cards: James Vaifale (yellow card) 59'	Referee: Federico Anselmi (UAR) Assistants: Rob Halcomb (USAR) & Saade Bou-Mikael (USAR) Man of the Match:

May 22	Houston SaberCats	13–21	Old Glory DC	AVEVA Stadium
19:00 CDT	Try: Adriaan Booysen 46'; Con: Automatic conversion 46'; Pen: Sam Windsor (2/2) 11', 21'	Report	Try: Danny Tusitala 26'; Mike Dabulas 51'; Con: Jason Robertson (1/2) 52'; Pen: Jason Robertson (2/2) 36', 64'; Drop: Jason Robertson (1/1) 79'; Cards: Jamason Faʻanana-Schultz (red card) 70'	Referee: Mike Lash (NZR) Assistants: Joey Swatzell (USAR) & Jarrod Ford (USAR) Man of the Match:

May 23	(1 BP) Rugby United NY	29–19	New England Free Jacks	Cochrane Stadium
16:00 EDT	Try: Dylan Fawsitt (2) 7', 72'; Joel Miranda 12'; Apenisa Cakaubalavu 23'; Harry Bennett 43'; Con: Harry Bennett (1/4) 8'; Chris Mattina (1/1) 73'; Cards: Apenisa Cakaubalavu (yellow card) 53'	Report	Try: Joe Johnston 18'; Wian Conradie (2) 36', 49'; Con: John Poland (1/2) 19'; Beaudein Waaka (1/1) 50'; Cards: Aleki Morris-Lome (yellow card) 41'	Referee: Scott Green (USAR) Assistants: Luke Rogan (USAR) & Miles McIvor (USAR) Man of the Match: Andrew Ellis (Rugby United NY) 1st annual "Chowder Cup" match winners (first match): Rugby United NY (1–0)

May 23	Seattle Seawolves	6–25	Rugby ATL (1 BP)	Starfire Stadium
17:00 PDT	Pen: AJ Alatimu (2/2) 9', 19'	Report	Try: Bautista Ezcurra (2) 14', 75'; Johan Momsen 21'; Marko Janse van Rensburg 35'; Con: Automatic conversion 14'; Adriaan Carelse (0/2); Bautista Ezcurra (0/1); Pen: Adriaan Carelse (1/2) 44'; Cards: Ross Deacon (yellow card) 54'; Robbie Petzer (yellow card) 66'	Referee: Jack Gohl (RA) Assistants: Denny Russell (USAR) & Brett Johnson (USAR) Man of the Match: Bautista Ezcurra (Rugby ATL)

Bye/s: San Diego Legion, Toronto Arrows

==== Week 11 (May 29–30) ====
May 29	(1 BP) San Diego Legion	39–11	Houston SaberCats	Chula Vista Elite Athlete Training Center
13:00 PDT	Try: Tiaan Loots 22'; Joshua Furno 27'; Dean Muir 32'; Thomas Morani 77'; Keni Nasoqeqe 80'; Con: Automatic conversion (2) 22', 27'; Joe Pietersen (2) 78', 80'; Pen: Joe Pietersen (2) 8', 38'; Cards: Bjorn Basson (yellow card) 64'	Report	Try: Veramu Dikidikilati 47'; Pen: Sam Windsor (2) 6', 20'	Referee: Derek Summers (USAR) Man of the Match: Thomas Morani (San Diego Legion)

May 29	New England Free Jacks	14–12	Toronto Arrows (1 BP)	Union Point Sports Complex
16:00 EDT	Try: Josh Larsen 60'; Con: Beaudein Waaka (0/1); Pen: Beaudein Waaka (3/3) 9', 11', 19'	Report	Try: Adrian Wadden 12'; Joaquín Tuculet 65'; Con: Will Kelly (1/1) 13'; Tayler Adams (0/1); Pen: Will Kelly (0/1)	Referee: Luke Rogan (USAR) Assistants: Amelia Luciano (USAR) & Pearce Mara (USAR) Man of the Match:

May 29	Rugby ATL	17–12	LA Giltinis (1 BP)	Lupo Family Field
20:00 EDT	Try: Adriaan Carelse 22'; Ryan Rees 45'; Con: Adriaan Carelse (2/2) 23', 46'; Pen: Adriaan Carelse (1/1) 40'	Report	Try: D. T. H. van der Merwe 30'; Angus Cottrell 75'; Con: Matt Giteau (0/1); Luke Carty (1/1) 75'; Cards: Luke White (red card) 35'	Referee: JP Doyle (RFU) Assistants: Mike Lash (NZR) & Henrique Platais (CBRu) Man of the Match: Matt Heaton (Rugby ATL)

May 29	(1 BP) Utah Warriors	45–24	Austin Gilgronis	Zions Bank Stadium
19:00 MDT	Try: Aston Fortuin 10'; Matt Jensen 25'; Mika Kruse 38'; Bailey Wilson 45'; Mike Te'o 54'; Chad Gough 76'; Con: Calvin Whiting (4/4) 11', 39', 55', 77'; Automatic conversion (2) 25', 45'; Pen: Calvin Whiting (1/1) 3'	Report	Try: Sebastian de Chaves 51'; Paddy Ryan 60'; Cole Davis 73'; Con: Mack Mason (3/3) 52', 61', 74'; Pen: Mack Mason (1/1) 42'; Cards: Isaac Ross (yellow card) 37'	Referee: Federico Anselmi (UAR) Assistants: Kahlil Harrison (USAR) & Niku Kruger (USAR) Man of the Match: Mike Te'o (Utah Warriors)

May 30	Old Glory DC	10–46	Rugby United NY (1 BP)	Segra Field
13:00 EDT	Try: Steven Longwell 27'; Renata Roberts-Tenana 32'; Con: Jason Robertson (0/2)	Report	Try: Dylan Fawsitt 3'; Apenisa Cakaubalavu 7'; Nate Brakeley 12'; Ben Foden 20'; Kara Pryor 45'; Will Leonard 71'; Chris Mattina 79'; Con: Chris Mattina (3/6) 21', 46', 72'; Automatic conversion 7'; Pen: Chris Mattina (1/1) 37'; Cards: Kara Pryor (yellow card) 30'; Harry Bennett (yellow card) 31'	Referee: Scott Green (USAR) Assistants: Mike O'Brien (USAR) & Gavin McCandless (USAR) Man of the Match: Ben Foden (Rugby United NY)

Bye/s: New Orleans Gold, Seattle Seawolves

==== Week 12 (June 5–6) ====
June 5	Houston SaberCats	9–28	Austin Gilgronis (1 BP)	AVEVA Stadium
19:00 CDT	Pen: Sam Windsor (3/3) 39', 49', 62'; Cards: Jérémy Lenaerts (yellow card) 69'	Report	Try: Kurt Morath 27'; Maclean Jones 51'; Cam Dodson 69'; Jamie Mackintosh 80'; Con: Automatic conversion (2) 27', 51'; Kurt Morath (2/2) 70', 80'; Cards: Dominic Akina (yellow card) 45'; Sebastian de Chaves (yellow card) 57'	Referee: Jack Gohl (RA) Assistants: Joey Swatzell (USAR) & Jarrod Ford (USAR) Man of the Match: Cam Dodson (Austin Gilgronis) 2nd annual "Texas Cup" match winners (second match): Austin Gilgronis (3–0)

June 5	(1 BP) New Orleans Gold	7–8	Rugby ATL	Gold Mine
19:30 CDT	Try: Cam Dolan 39'; Con: Damian Stevens (1/1) 40'	Report	Try: Jeremy Misailegalu 13'; Con: Adriaan Carelse (0/1); Pen: Adriaan Carelse (1/1) 72'	Referee: Scott Green (USAR) Assistants: Kat Roche (USAR) & Allen Alongi (USAR) Man of the Match: Adriaan Carelse (Rugby ATL)

June 6	Toronto Arrows	30–40	San Diego Legion (1 BP)	Lupo Family Field
12:00 EDT	Try: Joaquín Tuculet 40'; Gastón Mieres 53'; Leandro Leivas 75'; Con: Tayler Adams (3/3) 40', 54', 76'; Pen: Tayler Adams (3/4) 15', 20', 46'	Report	Try: Ethan McVeigh 12'; Joshua Furno (2) 51', 60'; Tiaan Loots 71'; Con: Automatic conversion (3) 12', 51', 78'; Joe Pietersen (1/1) 61'; Pen: Joe Pietersen (3/3) 3', 7', 78'; Drop: Joe Pietersen 22'; Cards: Tiaan Loots (yellow card) 35'; Dan Pryor (yellow card) 67'	Referee: Federico Anselmi (UAR) Assistants: Henrique Platais (CBRu) & Cisco Lopez (USAR) Man of the Match: Joe Pietersen (San Diego Legion)

June 6	(1 BP) New England Free Jacks	38–34	Old Glory DC (2 BP)	Union Point Sports Complex
18:00 EDT	Try: Pieter Jansen 3'; Vili Tolutaʻu 10'; Erich de Jager 26'; Tera Mtembu 40'; Beaudein Waaka 45'; Penalty Try 56'; Con: Beaudein Waaka (2/4) 11', 40'; Automatic conversion 45', 56'	Report	Try: Cory Daniel (2) 15', 38'; Sam Cusano (2) 47', 77'; Jason Robertson 51'; D'Montae Noble 67'; Con: Jason Robertson (2/6) 39', 52'; Cards: Apisai Naikatini (yellow card) 56'	Referee: Mike Lash (NZR) Assistants: Amelia Luciano (USAR) & Nick Tricarico (USAR) Man of the Match: Pieter Jansen (New England Free Jacks)

June 6	(2 BP) Seattle Seawolves	28–29	Utah Warriors (1 BP)	Starfire Stadium
17:00 PDT	Try: Riekert Hattingh 17'; Ross Neal (2) 30', 50'; Naulia Dawai 34'; Con: Automatic conversion 17'; AJ Alatimu (3/3) 31', 35', 51'; Pen: AJ Alatimu (0/2)	Report	Try: Franco van der Berg 2'; Baliey Wilson 22'; Jurie van Vuuren 59'; Olive Kilifi 80'; Con: Calvin Whiting (3/4) 3', 60', 80'; Pen: Calvin Whiting (1/1) 40'	Referee: JP Doyle (RFU) Assistants: Denny Russell (USAR) & Ryan Curtis (USAR) Man of the Match: Olive Kilifi (Utah Warriors)

Bye/s: LA Giltinis, Rugby United New York

==== Week 13 (June 12–13) ====
June 12	(1 BP) Old Glory DC	21–25	New Orleans Gold	Segra Field
17:00 EDT	Try: Thretton Palamo 14'; Mungo Mason 23'; D'Montae Noble 80'; Con: Automatic conversion 14'; Jason Robertson (1/1) 24'; Mike Dabulas (1/1) 80'; Cards: Danny Tusitala (yellow card) 36'	Report	Try: Juan Cappiello 8'; Hanno Dirksen 28'; Julián Domínguez 49'; Con: Automatic conversion 8'; Holden Yungert (1/2) 29'; Pen: Holden Yungert (1/1) 44'; Damian Stevens (1/1) 71'; Cards: Juan Cappiello (yellow card) 36'; Eric Howard (yellow card) 40'; Brian Nault (yellow card) 78'	Referee: Derek Summers (USAR) Assistants: Gavin McCandless (USAR) & AN Other (USAR) Man of the Match: Hanno Dirksen (NOLA Gold)

June 12	(1 BP) Austin Gilgronis	47–21	Toronto Arrows	Bold Stadium
19:00 CDT	Try: Zinzan Elan-Puttick 13'; Robbie Coetzee 17'; Dominic Akina (2) 40', 61'; Kyle Breytenbach 50'; LaRome White 64'; Hugh Roach 75'; Con: Kurt Morath (4/5) 18', 40', 51', 76'; Automatic conversion (2) 61', 64'	Report	Try: Joaquín Tuculet 35'; Ben LeSage 70'; Mitch Richardson 78'; Con: Spencer Jones (0/3); Pen: Spencer Jones (2/2) 8', 47'	Referee: Luke Rogan (USAR) Assistants: Kat Roche (USAR) & Butch Neuenschwander (USAR) Man of the Match: Dominic Akina (Austin Gilgronis)

June 12	(1 BP) Utah Warriors	45–41	San Diego Legion (2 BP)	Zions Bank Stadium
19:00 MDT	Try: Thomas Tu’avao 38'; Jurie van Vuuren 44'; Aston Fortuin 55'; Mike Te'o 67'; Chad Gough 73'; James Vaifale 80'; Con: Calvin Whiting (5) 39', 56', 67', 74', 80'; Automatic conversion 44'; Pen: Calvin Whiting 19'	Report	Try: Fakaʻosi Pifeleti 7'; Dean Muir 27'; Thomas Morani 47'; Cam Clark 49'; Tiaan Loots 59'; Bjorn Basson 62'; Con: Joe Pietersen (4) 8', 28', 48', 63'; Drop: Joe Pietersen 42'; Cards: Carlo de Nysschen (yellow card) 51'	Referee: JP Doyle (RFU) Man of the Match: James Vaifale (Utah Warriors)

June 13	(1 BP) Rugby United NY	31–24	Rugby ATL (2 BP)	Belson Stadium
14:00 EDT	Try: Andrew Ellis 5'; Apenisa Cakaubalavu 23'; Kyle Sumsion 31'; Conor McManus 44'; James Rochford 60'; Con: Automatic conversion (3) 5', 44', 60'; Chris Mattina (0/2)	Report	Try: Jason Damm 12'; Johan Momsen 36'; Bautista Ezcurra 58'; Alex Maughan 69'; Con: Adriaan Carelse (2/4) 37', 70'	Referee: Federico Anselmi (UAR) Assistants: Lex Weiner (USAR) & Miles McIvor (USAR) Man of the Match: Nate Brakeley (Rugby United NY)

June 13	New England Free Jacks	25–21	Seattle Seawolves (1 BP)	Union Point Sports Complex
17:00 EDT	Try: Mitch Wilson 15'; Harry Barlow 55'; Pieter Jansen 75'; Con: Beaudein Waaka (2/3) 16', 76'; Pen: Beaudein Waaka (2/2) 11', 44'	Report	Try: Lauina Futi 3'; Suliasi Tamaivena (2) 24', 48'; Con: Automatic conversion (2) 3', 48'; AJ Alatimu (1/1) 25'	Referee: Scott Green (USAR) Assistants: Amelia Luciano (USAR) & Pearce Mara (USAR) Man of the Match: Wian Conradie (New England Free Jacks)

June 13	(1 BP) LA Giltinis	52–5	Houston SaberCats	Los Angeles Memorial Coliseum
16:00 PDT	Try: JP Smith (2) 6', 56'; D. T. H. van der Merwe 14'; Christian Poidevin 25'; Glenn Bryce 35'; Pago Haini (2) 51', 70'; Serupepeli Vularika 65'; Con: Matt Giteau (4/6) 15', 26', 36', 57'; Automatic conversion 65'; Luke Burton (1/1) 72'	Report	Try: Diego Magno 75'; Con: Sam Windsor (0/1)	Referee: Mike Lash (NZR) Assistants: Marquise Goodwin (USAR) & Jack Gohl (RA) Man of the Match: Pago Haini (LA Giltinis)

==== Week 14 (June 19–20) ====
June 19	(2 BP) Rugby United NY	28–29	Utah Warriors (1 BP)	Cochrane Stadium
14:30 EDT	Try: Apenisa Cakaubalavu 6'; Harry Bennett 23'; Sakaria Taulafo 35'; Wilton Rebolo 46'; Con: Automatic conversion (2) 6', 35'; Harry Bennett (2/2) 24', 47'; Pen: Harry Bennett (0/1); Cards: Nate Brakeley (yellow card) 59'	Report	Try: Sama Malolo 13'; Olive Kilifi 31'; Thomas Tu’avao 39'; Cliven Loubser 60'; Mika Kruse 77'; Con: Cliven Loubser (2/5) 14', 32'; Cards: Paul Mullen (yellow card) 22'	Referee: Scott Green (USAR) Assistants: Luke Rogan (USAR) & Lex Weiner (USAR) Man of the Match: Lance Williams (Utah Warriors)

June 19	(1 BP) Toronto Arrows	12–18	New Orleans Gold	Lupo Family Field
16:30 EDT	Try: Ben LeSage 27'; Gastón Mieres 63'; Con: Spencer Jones (1/2) 28'; Drop: Will Kelly (0/1)	Report	Try: Julián Domínguez 19'; Cam Dolan 52'; Con: Holden Yungert (1/2) 53'; Pen: Damian Stevens (2/2) 74', 80'	Referee: JP Doyle (RFU) Assistants: Henrique Platais (CBRu) & Cisco Lopez (USAR) Man of the Match:

June 19	(1 BP) Rugby ATL	33–15	Houston SaberCats	Lupo Family Field
20:00 EDT	Try: Ross Deacon (2) 14', 48'; Jason Damm (2) 36', 60'; Neethling Gericke 67'; Con: Adriaan Carelse (3/4) 49', 61', 68'; Automatic conversion 36'	Report	Pen: Sam Windsor (5/5) 17', 25', 33', 40', 45'	Referee: Jack Gohl (RA) Assistants: Henrique Platais (CBRu) & Cisco Lopez (USAR) Man of the Match: Jason Damm (Rugby ATL)

June 20	(1 BP) San Diego Legion	13–19	LA Giltinis	Torero Stadium
15:00 PDT	Try: Dean Muir 35'; Con: Joe Pietersen (1/1) 36'; Pen: Joe Pietersen (2/4) 5', 68'	Report	Try: John Ryberg (2) 38', 71'; Angus Cottrell 46'; Con: Luke Burton (1/2) 47'; Luke Carty (1/1) 73'; Pen: Luke Burton (0/2); Luke Carty (0/2); Cards: Luke Carty (yellow card) 30'	Referee: Mike Lash (NZR) Assistants: Austin Reed (USAR) & Deven O'Crump (USAR) Man of the Match: Bill Meakes (LA Giltinis) 1st annual "California Derby Trophy" match winners: LA Giltinis (1–0)

June 20	(2 BP) Seattle Seawolves	31–36	Austin Gilgronis (1 BP)	Starfire Stadium
17:00 PDT	Try: Lauina Futi (3) 10', 52', 71'; Mike Shepherd 43'; Tommy Hunkin-Clark 79'; Con: AJ Alatimu (2/3) 44', 53'); Automatic conversion 71'	Report	Try: Maclean Jones 7'; Hugh Roach (2) 16', 33'; Conner Mooneyham 54'; Frank Halai 66'; Con: Kurt Morath (3/4) 8', 17', 55'; Automatic conversion 66'; Pen: Kurt Morath (1/1) 75'	Referee: Federico Anselmi (UAR) Assistants: Denny Russell (USAR) & Ryan Curtis (USAR) Man of the Match: Hugh Roach (Austin Gilgronis)

Bye/s: New England Free Jacks, Old Glory DC

==== Week 15 (June 26–27) ====
June 26	(1 BP) Toronto Arrows	24–31	Rugby United NY (1 BP)	Lupo Family Field
16:30 EDT	Try: Joaquín Tuculet 16'; Mike Sheppard 40'; Mitch Richardson 60'; Con: Will Kelly (2/2) 17', 61'; Automatic conversion 40'; Pen: Will Kelly (1/1) 5'	Report	Try: Hanco Germishuys (2) 10', 45'; Apenisa Cakaubalavu 19'; Ben Foden 33'; Benjamín Bonasso 35'; Con: Harry Bennett (2/4) 34', 46'; Automatic conversion 35'	Referee: Mike Lash (NZR) Assistants: Lex Weiner (USAR) & Pete Chamberlain (USAR) Man of the Match: Hanco Germishuys (Rugby United NY)

June 26	New England Free Jacks	9–17	New Orleans Gold	Union Point Sports Complex
18:00 EDT	Pen: Beaudein Waaka (3/3) 10', 24', 27'; Cards: Aleki Morris-Lome (yellow card) 74'	Report	Try: Pat O'Toole 45'; Penalty try 52'; Con: Carl Meyer (1/1) 46'; Automatic Conversion 52'; Pen: Carl Meyer (1/2) 72'; Cards: Dino Waldren (yellow card) 23'; Devin Short (yellow card) 74'	Referee: Luke Rogan (USAR) Assistants: Amelia Luciano (USAR) & Mike Rudzinsky (USAR) Man of the Match: Cam Dolan (New Orleans Gold)

June 26	Houston SaberCats	5–24	Utah Warriors (1 BP)	Aveva Stadium
19:00 CDT	Try: Veramu Dikidikilati 16'; Con: Sam Windsor (0/1); Cards: Jérémy Lenaerts (yellow card) 40'	Report	Try: Josh Whippy 20'; Penalty try 40'; Mika Kruse 68'; Jurie van Vuuren 80'; Con: Calvin Whiting (1/3) 80'; Automatic conversion 40'; Cards: Michael Baska (yellow card) 51'	Referee: Scott Green (USAR) Assistants: Jarrod Ford (USAR) & Mitch Damm (USAR) Man of the Match: Mika Kruse (Utah Warriors)

June 26	(1 BP) Rugby ATL	32–12	Old Glory DC	Lupo Family Field
20:00 EDT	Try: Marko Janse van Rensburg 3'; Wikus Groenewald 16'; Austin White 39'; Mark O'Keeffe 48'; Con: Bautista Ezcurra (2/3) 4', 49'; Automatic conversion 16'; Pen: Bautista Ezcurra (1/2) 22'; Kurt Coleman (1/1) 76'; Cards: Jeremy Misailegalu (yellow card) 30'	Report	Try: Thretton Palamo 33'; Josh Brown 80'; Con: Jason Robertson (1/2) 34'; Cards: Renata Roberts-Tenana (yellow card) 46'	Referee: Federico Anselmi (UAR) Assistants: Lex Weiner (USAR) & Pete Chamberlain (USAR) Man of the Match:

June 26	San Diego Legion	14–33	Austin Gilgronis (1 BP)	Torero Stadium
19:00 PDT	Try: Bjorn Basson (2) 4', 36'; Con: Joe Pietersen (2/2) 5', 37'; Pen: Joe Pietersen (0/1); Cards: Dean Muir (yellow card) 69'; Chris Baumann (yellow card) 76'	Report	Try: Hugh Roach 19'; Bryce Campbell 28'; Jamie Mackintosh 42'; Ruben de Haas 61'; Lachlan McCaffrey 72'; Con: Kurt Morath (2/2) 20', 29'; Mack Mason (0/1); Will Magie (1/1) 62'; Automatic conversion 72'; Pen: Kurt Morath (0/1); Mack Mason (0/1)	Referee: JP Doyle (RFU) Assistants: Austin Reed (USAR) & Jacob Gonzalez (USAR) Man of the Match: Lachlan McCaffrey (Austin Gilgronis)

June 27	Seattle Seawolves	14–29	LA Giltinis (1 BP)	Starfire Stadium
17:00 PDT	Try: Sitiveni Tamaivena 45'; Conor McGill 54'; Con: AJ Alatimu (2/2) 46', 55'	Report	Try: Adam Ashe 2'; Cristian Rodriguez 20'; Ryan James 35'; Bill Meakes 40'; Con: Luke Carty (3/4) 2', 21', 36'; Pen: Luke Carty (1/1) 52'; Cards: Dave Dennis (yellow card) 44'; JP Smith (yellow card) 47'	Referee: Derek Summers (USAR) Assistants: Denny Russell (USAR) & Brett Johnson (USAR) Man of the Match:

==== Week 16 (July 3–4) ====
July 3	(1 BP) San Diego Legion	34–21	Seattle Seawolves	Chula Vista Elite Athlete Training Center
12:00 PDT	Try: Peter Malcolm 2'; Ryan Matyas (2) 19', 26'; Cole Zarcone 23'; Cam Clark 39'; Con: Santiago González Iglesias (3/5) 20', 27', 40'; Pen: Santiago González Iglesias (1/1) 72'	Report	Try: Rhyno Herbst 36'; James Malcolm 42'; Tommy Hunkin-Clark 66'; Con: AJ Alatimu (2/2) 37', 43'; Automatic conversion 66'; Cards: Lauina Futi (yellow card) 17'; Karsten Leitner (yellow card) 21'; Rhyno Herbst (yellow card) 45'	Referee: Scott Green (USAR) Assistants: Austin Reed (USAR) & Alexis Alfaro (USAR) Man of the Match: Cecil Afrika (San Diego Legion)

July 3	(1 BP) New England Free Jacks	22–6	Rugby United NY	Union Point Sports Complex
16:00 EDT	Try: Mitch Wilson 35'; Harrison Boyle 63'; Harry Barlow 71'; Tuidraki Samusamuvodre 80+4'; Con: Beaudein Waaka (1/3) 64'; Tuidraki Samusamuvodre (0/1); Pen: Beaudein Waaka (0/1)	Report	Pen: Dan Hollinshead (2/2) 56', 68'	Referee: JP Doyle (RFU) Assistants: Amelia Luciano (USAR) & Mike Rudzinsky (USAR) Man of the Match: Beaudein Waaka (New England Free Jacks)

July 4	(1 BP) Toronto Arrows	34–28	Old Glory DC (2 BP)	Lupo Family Field
18:00 EDT	Try: Andrew Ferguson (2) 30', 48'; Giuseppe du Toit 53'; Sam Malcolm 56'; Con: Automatic conversion 30'; Tayler Adams (3/3) 49', 54', 57'; Pen: Tayler Adams (2/3) 22', 69'; Cards: Joaquín Tuculet (yellow card) 70'	Report	Try: Renata Roberts-Tenana 16'; James King 27'; Cory Daniel 42'; Danny Thomas 70'; Con: Jason Robertson (4/4) 17', 28', 43', 71'; Cards: Danny Tusitala (yellow card) 75'	Referee: Mike Lash (NZR) Assistants: Cisco Lopez (USAR) & Pete Chamberlain (USAR) Man of the Match: Tayler Adams (Toronto Arrows)

July 4	(1 BP) LA Giltinis	20–21	NOLA Gold	Los Angeles Memorial Coliseum
19:00 PDT	Try: Dave Dennis 13'; Marco Fepulea'i 21'; Con: Matt Giteau (2/2) 14', 22'; Pen: Matt Giteau (1/1) 60'; Serupepeli Vularika (1/1) 75'; Cards: Pago Haini (yellow card) 26'	Report	Try: Joeli Tikoisuva 55'; Hanno Dirksen 78'; Con: Carl Meyer (1/2) 56'; Pen: Carl Meyer (3/4) 39', 52', 58'; Damian Stevens (0/1); Cards: Carl Meyer (yellow card) 19'; Kyle Rogers (yellow card) 70'	Referee: Federico Anselmi (UAR) Assistants: Marquise Goodwin (USAR) & Jack Gohl (RA) Man of the Match: Hanno Dirksen (NOLA Gold)

Bye/s: Austin Gilgronis, Houston SaberCats, Rugby ATL, Utah Warriors

==== Week 17 (July 10–11) ====
July 10	(1 BP) Rugby United NY	54–19	Houston SaberCats	Belson Stadium
14:00 EDT	Try: Andrew Ellis (2) 5', 13'; Dylan Fawsitt (2) 11', 19'; Samu Tawake 34'; Apenisa Cakaubalavu 36'; Max Dacey 75'; Joel Miranda 76'; Con: Automatic conversion (2) 5', 75'; Dan Hollinshead (5/6) 12', 14', 20', 35', 37'	Report	Try: Paula Balekana 1'; Veramu Dikidikilati 42'; Nick Boyer 69'; Con: Sam Windsor (1/2) 43'; Automatic conversion 69'	Referee: Moe Chaudhry (RC) Assistants: Luke Rogan (USAR) & Miles McIvor (USAR) Man of the Match: Dan Hollinshead (Rugby United NY)

July 10	(1 BP) Old Glory DC	38–29	San Diego Legion (1 BP)	Segra Field
17:00 EDT	Try: Tevita Naqali 14'; Jack Iscaro 24'; Mungo Mason 32'; Ciaran Hearn 43'; Josh Brown 64'; Apisai Naikatini 75'; Con: Jason Robertson (4/6) 15', 25', 44', 76'; Pen: Jason Robertson (0/1)	Report	Try: Cecil Afrika 18'; Keni Nasoqeqe 26'; Paddy Ryan 38'; Bjorn Basson 57'; Peter Malcolm 79'; Con: Santiago González Iglesias (2/4) 27', 58'; Cecil Afrika (0/1); Cards: Chris Baumann (yellow card) 70'	Referee: Federico Anselmi (UAR) Assistants: Mike O'Brien (USAR) & Gavin McCandless (USAR) Man of the Match: Apisai Naikatini (Old Glory DC)

July 10	(1 BP) LA Giltinis	31–17	Austin Gilgronis	Los Angeles Memorial Coliseum
17:30 PDT	Try: Penalty try 17'; Bill Meakes 25'; John Ryberg (2) 51', 72'; Harrison Goddard 65'; Con: Automatic conversion 17'; Matt Giteau (2/4) 52', 66'	Report	Try: Lachlan McCaffrey 13'; Hugh Roach 35'; Con: Mack Mason (2/2) 14', 36'; Pen: Mack Mason (1/1) 21'; Cards: Michael de Waal (yellow card) 17'	Referee: JP Doyle (RFU) Assistants: Marquise Goodwin (USAR) & Jack Gohl (RA) Man of the Match: JP Smith (LA Giltinis)

July 10	(1 BP) Utah Warriors	31–41	Rugby ATL (1 BP)	Zions Bank Stadium
20:00 MDT	Try: Danny Christensen (2) 24', 80'; Sama Malolo (3) 50', 57', 74'; Con: Hagen Schulte (2/4) 25', 58'; Automatic conversion 74'	Report	Try: Marko Janse van Rensburg 6'; Johan Momsen (2) 19', 52'; Vili Helu 29'; Ross Deacon 42'; Austin White 68'; Con: Automatic conversion 6'; Bautista Ezcurra (0/2); Robbie Petzer (1/1) 43'; Kurt Coleman (2/2) 52', 69'; Pen: Kurt Coleman (1/1) 78'	Attendance: 4,500; Referee: Scott Green (USAR) Assistants: Khalil Harrison (USAR) & Niku Kruger (USAR) Man of the Match: Johan Momsen (Rugby ATL)

July 11	Toronto Arrows	17–28	New England Free Jacks (1 BP)	Lupo Family Field
12:00 EDT	Try: Tomás de la Vega 61; Joaquín Tuculet 74'; Con: Andrew Ferguson (1/1) 62'; Automatic conversion 74'; Pen: Sam Malcolm (1/1) 18'	Report	Try: Stephan Coetzee 30'; Vili Tolutaʻu 35'; Harry Barlow 54'; Conor Kindregan 57'; Con: Beaudein Waaka (4/4) 31', 36', 55', 58'	Referee: Derek Summers (USAR) Assistants: Kat Roche (USAR) & Cisco Lopez (USAR) Man of the Match:

July 11	Seattle Seawolves	30–6	New Orleans Gold	Starfire Stadium
17:00 PDT	Try: James Malcolm (2) 40', 47'; JP Smith 59'; Con: AJ Alatimu (2/2) 40', 48'; Automatic conversion 59'; Pen: AJ Alatimu (2/2) 22', 35'; Kieran Joyce (1/1) 76'	Report	Pen: Carl Meyer (2/2) 37', 44'	Referee: Mike Lash (USAR) Assistants: Denny Russell (USAR) & Ryan Curtis (USAR) Man of the Match: JP Smith (Seattle Seawolves)

==== Week 18 (July 15–18) ====
July 15	(1 BP) Seattle Seawolves	40–21	Houston SaberCats	Starfire Stadium
19:00 PDT	Try: Victor Comptat 8'; Rhyno Herbst 13'; Samu Manoa 26'; James Malcolm 54'; Sitiveni Tamaivena 64'; Devereaux Ferris 75'; Con: Kieran Joyce (4/5) 9', 14', 27', 55'; Automatic conversion 64'; Pen: Kieran Joyce (0/1); Cards: Victor Comptat (yellow card) 47'	Report	Try: Adriaan Booysen 50'; Jérémy Lenaerts 57'; Paula Balekana 69'; Con: Sam Windsor (3/3) 51', 58', 70'; Cards: Apisai Tauyavuca (yellow card) 23'	Referee: Kat Roche (USAR) Assistants: Mike Lash (NZR) & Denny Russell (USAR) Man of the Match: AJ Alatimu (Seattle Seawolves)

July 17	(2 BP) Rugby United NY	32–35	New Orleans Gold (1 BP)	Belson Stadium
14:00 EDT	Try: Benjamín Bonasso 15'; Samu Tawake 25'; Hanco Germishuys 48'; Ben Foden 63'; Con: Automatic conversion (2) 15', 63'; Dan Hollinshead (1/2) 26'; Pen: Dan Hollinshead (2/3) 33', 76'; Cards: Kara Pryor (yellow card) 20'; Apenisa Cakaubalavu (yellow card) 30'; Kara Pryor (red card) 38'	Report	Try: Carl Meyer 3'; Pat O'Toole 31'; Julián Domínguez 58'; Moni Tonga’uiha 71'; Joeli Tikoisuva 79'; Con: Automatic conversion (3) 3', 31', 79'; Timothée Guillimin (2/2) 59', 72'; Cards: Juan Cappiello (yellow card) 38'	Referee: JP Doyle (RFU) Assistants: Luke Rogan (USAR) & Lex Weiner (USAR) Man of the Match: Hanco Germishuys (Rugby United NY)

July 17	(1 BP) Old Glory DC	29–25	Austin Gilgronis (1 BP)	Segra Field
17:00 EDT	Try: Jason Robertson 5'; D'Montae Noble 29'; Penalty try 38'; Mungo Mason 45'; Con: Jason Robertson (2/3) 6', 30'; Automatic conversion 38'; Pen: Jason Robertson (1/2) 15'	Report	Try: Dominic Akina 3'; Mack Mason 12'; Rodrick Waters 57'; Con: Mack Mason (2/3) 4', 58'; Pen: Mack Mason (2/2) 33', 78'; Cards: David Still (yellow card) 24'; Michael de Waal (yellow card) 37'	Referee: Scott Green (USAR) Assistants: Mike O'Brien (USAR) & Gavin McCandless (USAR) Man of the Match: Jason Robertson (Old Glory DC) 1st annual "Cuisine Solutions Cup" match winners: Old Glory DC (1–0)

July 17	(1 BP) Utah Warriors	34–29	LA Giltinis (2 BP)	Zions Bank Stadium
18:00 MDT	Try: Aston Fortuin 5'; Jurie van Vuuren 21'; Mika Baska 24'; Sama Malolo 37’, 53'; Mike Te'o 78'; Con: Hagen Schulte (2/2) 6', 79'	Report	Try: Adam Channel (2) 2', 45'; Ryan James 32'; Serupepeli Vularika 74'; Con: Luke Burton (2/2) 33', 57'	Referee: Mike Lash (NZR) Assistants: Kahlil Harrison (USAR) & Niku Kurger (USAR) Man of the Match: Sama Malolo (Utah Warriors)

July 18	New England Free Jacks	22–19	Rugby ATL (1 BP)	Veterans Memorial Stadium
16:00 EDT	Try: Wian Conradie 3'; Pieter Jansen 24'; Tuidraki Samusamuvodre 40'; Con: Beaudein Waaka (2/3) 4', 25'; Pen: Beaudein Waaka (1/1) 35'; Cards: Wian Conradie (yellow card) 55'; Tuidraki Samusamuvodre (yellow card) 66'	Report	Try: Ross Deacon 12'; Jeremy Misailegalu 60'; Ryan Nell 69'; Con: Kurt Coleman (2/3) 61', 70'	Referee: Federico Anselmi (ARU) Assistants: Amelia Luciano (USAR) & Mike Rudzinsky (USAR) Man of the Match:

Bye/s: San Diego Legion, Toronto Arrows

== Playoffs ==
=== Bracket ===
Semi-Finals
1	LA Giltinis	17
4	Utah Warriors	13
2	Rugby ATL	10
3	Rugby United New York	9

Finals
1	LA Giltinis	31
2	Rugby ATL	17

=== Semifinals ===
July 24, 2021	Rugby ATL	10–9	Rugby United NY	Lupo Family Field
20:00 EDT	Try: Alex Maughan 75'; Con: Kurt Coleman (1/1) 76'; Pen: Bautista Ezcurra (1/3) 9'; Cards: Chance Wenglewski (yellow card) 49'	Report	Pen: Harry Bennett (3/3) 34', 36', 61'; Cards: James Rochford (yellow card) 47'; Quinn Ngawati (yellow card) 68'	Attendance: 1,792; Referee: JP Doyle (RFU) Assistants: Mike Lash (NZR) & Mike O'Brien (USAR) TMO: Derek Summers (USAR) Man of the Match: Johan Momsen (Rugby ATL)

July 25, 2021	LA Giltinis	17–13	Utah Warriors	Los Angeles Memorial Coliseum
15:00 PDT	Try: Adam Ashley-Cooper 35'; Ryan James (2) 68', 77'; Con: Matt Giteau (1/1) 36'; Luke Burton (0/1); Luke Carty (0/1); Pen: Luke Carty (0/1)	Report	Try: Sama Malolo 58'; Con: Automatic conversion 58'; Pen: Hagen Schulte (2/2) 40', 48'; Drop: Hagen Schulte (0/1)	Referee: JP Doyle (RFU) Assistants: Scott Green (USAR) & Austin Reed (USAR) TMO: Davey Ardrey (USAR) Man of the Match: Harrison Goddard (LA Giltinis)

=== Final ===
August 1, 2021	LA Giltinis	31–17	Rugby ATL	Los Angeles Memorial Coliseum
13:00 PDT	Try: John Ryberg (2) 21', 24'; D. T. H. van der Merwe 53'; Con: Matt Giteau (2/3) 22', 54'; Pen: Matt Giteau (3/3) 19', 44', 70'; Luke Burton (1/1) 76'	Report	Try: Marko Janse van Rensburg 36'; Ross Deacon 78'; Con: Kurt Coleman (2/2) 37', 79'; Pen: Kurt Coleman (1/1) 15'	Attendance: 7,389; Referee: JP Doyle (RFU) Assistants: Federico Anselmi (ARU) & Kahlil Harrison (USAR) TMO: Derek Summers (USAR) Man of the Match: Matt Giteau (LA Giltinis)

== Player statistics ==
=== Top scorers ===
The top ten try and point scorers during the 2021 Major League Rugby season were:

Last updated: August 2, 2021

Most tries
No	Player	Team	Tries
1	(Canada) D. T. H. van der Merwe	LA Giltinis	11
2	(South Africa) Bjorn Basson	San Diego Legion	10
3	(Australia) Angus Cottrell	LA Giltinis	9
3	(Argentina) Julián Domínguez	NOLA Gold	9
3	(United States) Dylan Fawsitt	Rugby United NY	9
3	(Scotland) Dougie Fife	New England Free Jacks	9
3	(Australia) Harrison Goddard	LA Giltinis	9
3	(Australia) Sama Malolo	Utah Warriors	9
3	(United States) John Ryberg	LA Giltinis	9
3	(United States) Mike Te'o	Utah Warriors	9
11	(England) Harry Barlow	New England Free Jacks	8
11	(South Africa) Marko Janse van Rensburg	Rugby ATL	8
11	(Scotland) James Malcolm	Seattle Seawolves	8
11	(England) Ross Neal	Seattle Seawolves	8

Most points
No	Player	Team	Pts
1	(New Zealand) Dan Hollinshead	RUNY	111
2	(Australia) Sam Windsor	Houston SaberCats	110
3	(New Zealand) Jason Robertson	Old Glory DC	108
4	(New Zealand) Beaudein Waaka	New England Free Jacks	105
5	(New Zealand) Tayler Adams	Toronto Arrows	104
6	(Australia) Matt Giteau	LA Giltinis	96
6	(Australia) Mack Mason	Austin Gilgronis	96
8	(Germany) Hagen Schulte	Utah Warriors	87
9	(South Africa) Joe Pietersen	San Diego Legion	78
10	(South Africa) Carl Meyer	NOLA Gold	66

=== Sanctions ===
Player	Team	Red	Yellow
(New Zealand) Kara Pryor	Rugby United New York	1	1
(Ireland) John Poland	New England Free Jacks	1	0
(United States) Josh Whippy	Utah Warriors	1	0
(United States) Jamason Faʻanana-Schultz	Old Glory DC	1	0
(Australia) Luke White	LA Giltinis	1	0
(England) Stan South	Old Glory DC	0	3
(Ireland) Ronan McCusker	New England Free Jacks	0	2
(South Africa) Jurie van Vuuren	Utah Warriors	0	2
(Canada) Travis Larsen	San Diego Legion	0	2
(United States) Vili Tolutaʻu	New England Free Jacks	0	2
(South Africa) Hanno Dirksen	NOLA Gold	0	2
(Fiji) Apisai Naikatini	Old Glory DC	0	2
(New Zealand) Aleki Morris-Lome	New England Free Jacks	0	2
(Belgium) Jérémy Lenaerts	Houston SaberCats	0	2
(Samoa) Danny Tusitala	Old Glory DC	0	2
(Argentina) Juan Cappiello	NOLA Gold	0	2
(South Africa) Michael de Waal	Austin Gilgronis	0	2
(Canada) Quinn Ngawati	Rugby United NY	0	2
(Ireland) James Rochford	Rugby United NY	0	1
(Australia) Christian Poidevin	LA Giltinis	0	1
(New Zealand) Aleki Morris-Lome	New England Free Jacks	0	1
(United States) Mitch Wilson	New England Free Jacks	0	1
(Australia) Sama Malolo	Utah Warriors	0	1
(United States) Lance Williams	Utah Warriors	0	1
(United States) Joeli Tikoisuva	NOLA Gold	0	1
(United States) Moni Tonga’uiha	NOLA Gold	0	1
(Chile) Nikola Bursic	NOLA Gold	0	1
(Canada) Conor Keys	Rugby ATL	0	1
(Ireland) Charlie Connolly	Houston SaberCats	0	1
(New Zealand) Harrison Boyle	New England Free Jacks	0	1
(Canada) Josh Larsen	New England Free Jacks	0	1
(United States) Kyle Ciquera	New England Free Jacks	0	1
(American Samoa) Joseph Mano	Utah Warriors	0	1
(Australia) Angus Cottrell	LA Giltinis	0	1
(Australia) Mahe Vailanu	LA Giltinis	0	1
(United States) Will Magie	Austin Gilgronis	0	1
(Uruguay) Diego Magno	Houston SaberCats	0	1
(Argentina) Nicolás Solveyra	Houston SaberCats	0	1
(United States) Zachary Short	Houston SaberCats	0	1
(Argentina) Gaston Cortes	Toronto Arrows	0	1
(South Africa) Cecil Afrika	San Diego Legion	0	1
(Canada) Djustice Sears-Duru	Seattle Seawolves	0	1
(South Africa) Marno Redelinghuys	Rugby ATL	0	1
(Argentina) Bautista Ezcurra	Rugby ATL	0	1
(New Zealand) Andrew Ellis	Rugby United NY	0	1
(Argentina) Benjamín Bonasso	Rugby United NY	0	1
(Australia) Luke Burton	LA Giltinis	0	1
(Fiji) Save Totovosau	San Diego Legion	0	1
(South Africa) Robbie Coetzee	Austin Gilgronis	0	1
(New Zealand) Tayler Adams	Toronto Arrows	0	1
(United States) Quentin Newcomer	New England Free Jacks	0	1
(United States) Conner Mooneyham	Austin Gilgronis	0	1
(United States) Paddy Ryan	Austin Gilgronis	0	1

Player	Team	Red	Yellow
(Georgia (country)) Nika Khatiashvili	Rugby ATL	0	1
(Canada) Andrew Quattrin	Toronto Arrows	0	1
(Fiji) Samu Tawake	Rugby United NY	0	1
(Scotland) Adam Ashe	LA Giltinis	0	1
(United States) Faka'osi Pifeleti	San Diego Legion	0	1
(United States) Siaosi Mahoni	San Diego Legion	0	1
(Canada) Eric Howard	NOLA Gold	0	1
(United States) Nick Boyer	Houston SaberCats	0	1
(Ireland) Mark O'Keeffe	Rugby ATL	0	1
(United States) Jackson Thiebes	New England Free Jacks	0	1
(Ireland) Will Leonard	Rugby United NY	0	1
(American Samoa) James Vaifale	Utah Warriors	0	1
(Fiji) Apenisa Cakaubalavu	Rugby United NY	0	1
(United States) Ross Deacon	Rugby ATL	0	1
(South Africa) Robbie Petzer	Rugby ATL	0	1
(South Africa) Bjorn Basson	San Diego Legion	0	1
(New Zealand) Isaac Ross	Austin Gilgronis	0	1
(Australia) Harry Bennett	Rugby United NY	0	1
(United States) Dominic Akina	Austin Gilgronis	0	1
(South Africa) Sebastian de Chaves	Austin Gilgronis	0	1
(South Africa) Tiaan Loots	San Diego Legion	0	1
(New Zealand) Dan Pryor	San Diego Legion	0	1
(Canada) Eric Howard	NOLA Gold	0	1
(United States) Brian Nault	NOLA Gold	0	1
(South Africa) Carlo de Nysschen	San Diego Legion	0	1
(United States) Nate Brakeley	Rugby United NY	0	1
(United States) Paul Mullen	Utah Warriors	0	1
(United States) Luke Carty	LA Giltinis	0	1
(United States) Dino Waldren	NOLA Gold	0	1
(United States) Devin Short	NOLA Gold	0	1
(United States) Michael Baska	Utah Warriors	0	1
(United States) Jeremy Misailegalu	Rugby ATL	0	1
(New Zealand) Renata Roberts-Tenana	Old Glory DC	0	1
(South Africa) Dean Muir	San Diego Legion	0	1
(United States) Chris Baumann	San Diego Legion	0	1
(Australia) Dave Dennis	LA Giltinis	0	1
(South Africa) JP Smith	LA Giltinis	0	1
(American Samoa) Lauina Futi	Seattle Seawolves	0	1
(Canada) Karsten Leitner	Seattle Seawolves	0	1
(South Africa) Rhyno Herbst	Seattle Seawolves	0	1
(Argentina) Joaquín Tuculet	Toronto Arrows	0	1
(United States) Pago Haini	LA Giltinis	0	1
(South Africa) Carl Meyer	NOLA Gold	0	1
(United States) Kyle Rogers	NOLA Gold	0	1
(United States) Chris Baumann	San Diego Legion	0	1
(Fiji) Apenisa Cakaubalavu	Rugby United NY	0	1
(United States) Victor Comptat	Seattle Seawolves	0	1
(Fiji) Apisai Tauyavuca	Houston SaberCats	0	1
(United States) David Still	Austin Gilgronis	0	1
(Namibia) Wian Conradie	New England Free Jacks	0	1
(Fiji) Tuidraki Samusamuvodre	New England Free Jacks	0	1

== End of Season Awards ==
=== All-MLR Awards ===
Player of the Year	Forward of the Year	Back of the Year	Coach of the Year	Rookie of the Year
Mike Te'o; Utah Warriors	Johan Momsen; Rugby ATL	Bill Meakes; LA Giltinis	Shawn Pittman; Utah Warriors	Andrew Guerra; NOLA Gold

=== All-MLR First Team ===
The top 30 players throughout the season were selected to make up the first and second All-MLR teams. The selections were voted on by a group made up of MLR media, referees, and stats specialists.

The 2021 All-MLR First XV Team is:

Pos		Player	Team
FB	15	(United States) Mike Te'o	(United States) Utah Warriors
RW	14	(Argentina) Julián Domínguez	(United States) NOLA Gold
OC	13	(Canada) Ben LeSage	(Canada) Toronto Arrows
IC	12	(Australia) Bill Meakes	(United States) LA Giltinis
LW	11	(Canada) D. T. H. van der Merwe	(United States) LA Giltinis
FH	10	(Australia) Matt Giteau	(United States) LA Giltinis
SH	9	(Australia) Harrison Goddard	(United States) LA Giltinis
N8	8	(Namibia) Wian Conradie	(United States) New England Free Jacks
OF	7	(Canada) Lucas Rumball	(Canada) Toronto Arrows
BF	6	(Australia) Angus Cottrell	(United States) LA Giltinis
RL	5	(United States) Nate Brakeley	(United States) Rugby United New York
LL	4	(South Africa) Johan Momsen	(United States) Rugby ATL
TP	3	(United States) Dino Waldren	(United States) NOLA Gold
HK	2	(Australia) Sama Malolo	(United States) Utah Warriors
LP	1	(United States) Chance Wenglewski	(United States) Rugby ATL

=== All-MLR Second Team ===
The All-MLR Second XV Team is:

Pos		Player	Team
FB	15	(England) Ben Foden	(United States) Rugby United New York
RW	14	(Fiji) Paula Balekana	(United States) Houston SaberCats
OC	13	(Australia) Adam Ashley-Cooper	(United States) LA Giltinis
IC	12	(Ireland) Mark O'Keeffe	(United States) Rugby ATL
LW	11	(South Africa) Bjorn Basson	(United States) San Diego Legion
FH	10	(New Zealand) Jason Robertson	(United States) Old Glory DC
SH	9	(New Zealand) Andrew Ellis	(United States) Rugby United New York
N8	8	(United States) Jason Damm	(United States) Rugby ATL
OF	7	(New Zealand) Joe Johnston	(United States) New England Free Jacks
BF	6	(Argentina) Tomás de la Vega	(Canada) Toronto Arrows
RL	5	(Australia) Dave Dennis	(United States) LA Giltinis
LL	4	(South Africa) Aston Fortuin	(United States) Utah Warriors
TP	3	(South Africa) JP Smith	(United States) LA Giltinis
HK	2	(United States) Dylan Fawsitt	(United States) Rugby United New York
LP	1	(United States) Angus MacLellan	(United States) Utah Warriors

=== Honorable Mention ===
For the first time in MLR history, an additional 15 players were also named "Honorable Mention" because of the 'surplus of excellent nominees'.

Rank		Player	Team
	1	(New Zealand) Jamie Mackintosh	(United States) Austin Gilgronis
	2	(United States) Mike Sosene-Feagai	(United States) Old Glory DC
	3	(Australia) Charlie Abel	(United States) LA Giltinis
	4	(South Africa) Rhyno Herbst	(United States) Seattle Seawolves
	5	(Australia) Nathan Den Hoedt	(United States) LA Giltinis
	6	(Argentina) Benjamín Bonasso	(United States) Rugby United New York
	7	(Australia) Bailey Wilson	(United States) Utah Warriors
	8	(United States) Cam Dolan	(United States) NOLA Gold
	9	(United States) Michael Baska	(United States) Utah Warriors
	10	(New Zealand) Dan Hollinshead	(United States) Rugby United New York
	11	(United States) Mika Kruse	(United States) Utah Warriors
	12	(South Africa) JP du Plessis	(United States) NOLA Gold
	13	(United States) Bryce Campbell	(United States) Austin Gilgronis
	14	(United States) Jeremy Misailegalu	(United States) Rugby ATL
	15	(New Zealand) Beaudein Waaka	(United States) New England Free Jacks
