= Karsten Leitner =

Canadian rugby union player

- Born: 4 June 1995 (age 31) Canada
- Height: 1.86 m (6 ft 1 in)
- Weight: 96 kg (15.1 st; 212 lb)

Rugby union career
- Position: Wing
Senior career
Years	Team	Apps	(Points)
2021–	Seattle Seawolves	0	(0)
- Correct as of 2 April 2021
International career
Years	Team	Apps	(Points)
2015	Canada U20	4	(10)
2017	Canada A	1	(0)
- Correct as of 2 April 2021
National sevens team
Years	Team		Comps
2016–2017	Canada Sevens		4
- Correct as of 2 April 2021

Karsten Leitner (born 4 June 1995) is a Canadian rugby union player for the Seattle Seawolves of Major League Rugby (MLR). His preferred position is wing.

== Professional career ==
Leitner signed for Major League Rugby side Seattle Seawolves during the 2021 Major League Rugby season. Leitner had previously represented the Canada Sevens team at 4 competitions between 2016 and 2017, and also represented Canada A in 2017.
