= Pago Haini =

American rugby union player

- Born: Pagopago Haini; 16 December 1991 (age 34) American Samoa
- Height: 1.85 m (6 ft 1 in)
- Weight: 105 kg (16.5 st; 231 lb)

Rugby union career
- Position: Flanker
Senior career
Years	Team	Apps	(Points)
2018	Houston SaberCats	4	(0)
2019	New England Free Jacks	0	(0)
2021–2022	LA Giltinis	13	(15)
2023–	Rugby New York	11	(10)
2024-present	Seattle Seawolves	17	(15)
- Correct as of 29 January 2025
National sevens team
Years	Team		Comps
2017	United States Sevens		2
- Correct as of 30 January 2021

Pago Haini (born 16 December 1991) is an American rugby union player, currently playing for Rugby New York (Ironworkers) in Major League Rugby (MLR). His preferred position is flanker.

== Professional career ==
Haini signed for Major League Rugby side LA Giltinis ahead of the 2021 Major League Rugby season. He had previously represented Houston SaberCats in Major League Rugby and was signed to the New England Free Jacks. Haini has also represented United States Sevens at two competitions.
