= Sebastian de Chaves =

South African rugby union player

- Born: 30 October 1990 (age 36) Johannesburg, South Africa
- Height: 2.02 m (6 ft 7 1/2 in)
- Weight: 120 kg (18 st 13 lb; 265 lb)
- School: De La Salle Holy Cross College

Rugby union career
- Position: Lock
Senior career
Years	Team	Apps	(Points)
2012–2013	Mont de Marsan	19	(0)
2013–2016	Leicester Tigers	45	(5)
2016−2019	London Irish	53	(20)
2019–2020	Newcastle Falcons	39	(0)
2020	London Irish	8	(0)
2021–2022	Austin Gilgronis	21	(5)
2021-2022	Wasps	5	(0)
2022-	Newcastle Falcons	42	(8)
- Correct as of 13 August 2021
Provincial / State sides
Years	Team	Apps	(Points)
2012	Golden Lions	3	(0)
International career
Years	Team	Apps	(Points)
2010	South Africa Under-20		

Sebastian de Chaves (born 30 October 1990) is a South African rugby union footballer who plays for Newcastle Falcons in the Gallagher Premiership. He plays as a Lock.

== Club career ==
De Chaves initially played with the Golden Lions, reaching an Under-19s Currie Cup Final in 2009 and playing Vodacom Cup rugby in 2012. In the same year, De Chaves moved to Stade Montois in France, newly promoted into the Top14. De Chaves again moved team in 2013, this time to Aviva Premiership club Leicester Tigers.

On 31 March 2016 it was announced that De Chaves would join English side London Irish on a two-year deal from the end of the 2015–2016 season.

He joined Newcastle Falcons ahead of the 2019–20 RFU Championship season.

In August 2020, de Chaves signed for former club London Irish on a short-term deal for the remainder of the Premiership Rugby season. He was due to return to Newcastle Falcons ahead of their return to Premiership Rugby; however, he signed for Major League Rugby side Austin Gilgronis ahead of the 2021 season.

On 15 September 2021, he returned to England once again as he signed a short-term deal with Wasps from the 2021-22 season.

De Chaves signed a new contract with Newcastle ahead of the 2022/23 season, marking his second spell with the club. In January 2024 the club announced that De Chaves had agreed a new two-year term, extending his stay in Newcastle to the end of the 2025/26 season.

== International career ==
De Chaves is qualified to play for South Africa, Portugal and England. However, as of 2014, De Chaves has only represented the South African Under-20s Team, playing for them in the 2010 IRB Junior World Championship and finishing in third place.
