= Aleki Morris-Lome =

New Zealand rugby union player

- Born: 29 May 1994 (age 32) Dunedin, New Zealand
- Height: 1.80 m (5 ft 11 in)
- Weight: 94 kg (207 lb; 14 st 11 lb)

Rugby union career
- Position: Centre
Senior career
| Years | Team | Apps | (Points) |
| 2016–2018 | Southland | 18 | (10) |
| 2017–2018 | Getxo Artea | 13 | (25) |
| 2019– | Otago | 17 | (25) |
| 2021– | New England Free Jacks | 0 | (0) |
- Correct as of 31 January 2021

Aleki Morris-Lome (born 29 May 1994) is a New Zealand rugby union player, currently playing for the New England Free Jacks of Major League Rugby (MLR). His preferred position is centre.

== Professional career ==
Morris-Lome signed for Major League Rugby side New England Free Jacks ahead of the 2021 Major League Rugby season. He had previously represented Southland from 2016 to 2018 and Otago from 2019 in the Mitre 10 Cup.
