= Juan Cappiello =

Argentine rugby union player

- Born: 4 March 1992 (age 34) Argentina
- Height: 1.80 m (5 ft 11 in)
- Weight: 93 kg (14.6 st; 205 lb)

Rugby union career
- Position: Centre
Senior career
Years	Team	Apps	(Points)
2012–	Pucará	98	(85)
2018	Carcassonne	4	(5)
2019–2020	Mont-de-Marsan	12	(0)
2021–	New Orleans Gold	0	(0)
- Correct as of 31 January 2021
International career
Years	Team	Apps	(Points)
2012	Argentina U20s	3	(10)
2013–2018	Argentina XV	29	(61)
- Correct as of 31 January 2021
National sevens team
Years	Team		Comps
2014	Argentina Sevens		2
- Correct as of 31 January 2021

Juan Cappiello (born 4 March 1992) is an Argentine rugby union player, currently playing for NOLA Gold of Major League Rugby (MLR). His preferred position is centre.

== Professional career ==
Cappiello signed for Major League Rugby side New Orleans Gold ahead of the 2021 Major League Rugby season. He previously represented both Carcassonne and Mont-de-Marsan in the Pro D2.
