= Kieran Joyce (rugby union) =

Irish rugby union player

- Born: 24 July 1996 (age 30) Warwickshire, England
- Height: 1.85 m (6 ft 1 in)
- Weight: 99 kg (15.6 st; 218 lb)
- School: Solihull School
- University: Queen's University Belfast
- Notable relative: Conor Joyce (brother)

Rugby union career
- Position: Centre
Amateur team(s)
Years	Team	Apps	(Points)
- Birmingham & Solihull R.F.C.
2015–2016	Ulster Academy		
2015	Malone RFC		
2017–2019	Corinthians		
–	Connacht Academy		
Senior career
Years	Team	Apps	(Points)
2017–2019	Connacht	2	(0)
2021–	Seattle Seawolves	0	(0)
- Correct as of 26 February 2021
International career
Years	Team	Apps	(Points)
2013	Ireland Schoolboys		
2014	Irish Exiles		
- Correct as of 26 February 2021

Kieran Joyce (born 24 July 1996) is an English-born Irish rugby union player who is currently a member of the Seattle Seawolves of Major League Rugby (MLR). He plays as a centre.

Joyce previously represented Connacht and Corinthians in the All-Ireland League.

== Professional rugby career ==
=== Connacht ===
Whilst still in the academy, Joyce made his senior competitive debut for Connacht in their 22–10 home victory against French side Perpignan during the 2018–19 Challenge Cup on 8 December 2018.

=== Seattle Seawolves ===
Joyce signed with the Seattle Seawolves for the 2021 Major League Rugby season.
