= Apenisa Cakaubalavu =

Fijian rugby union player (born 1993)

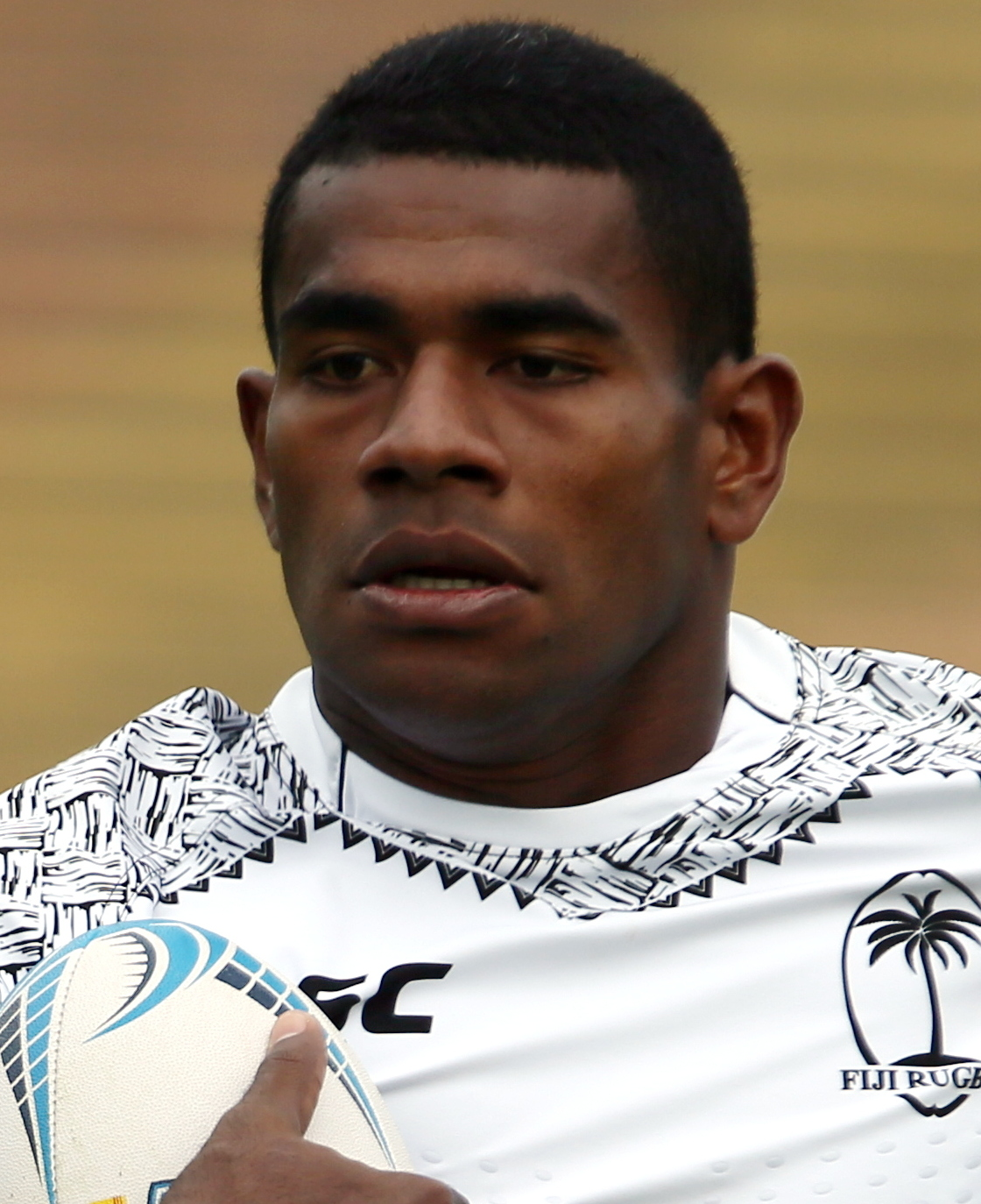
- Cakaubalavu in 2017
- Born: 14 February 1993 (age 33) Fiji
- Height: 1.80 m (5 ft 11 in)
- Weight: 90 kg (14 st; 200 lb)

Rugby union career
- Position: Wing
Senior career
Years	Team	Apps	(Points)
2021–	Rugby United New York	0	(0)
- Correct as of 31 January 2021
National sevens team
Years	Team		Comps
2017–2020	Fiji Sevens		13
- Correct as of 31 January 2021

Apenisa Cakaubalavu (born 14 February 1993) is a Fijian rugby union player who plays for Rugby United New York (RUNY) of Major League Rugby (MLR). His preferred position is wing.

== Professional career ==
Cakaubalavu signed for Major League Rugby side Rugby United New York ahead of the 2021 Major League Rugby season.

He had previously represented Fiji Sevens at 13 competitions between 2017 and 2020.
