= Gastón Cortés =

Argentine rugby union player (born 1985)

- Born: Rodrigo Gastón Cortés; 6 October 1985 (age 41) Cordoba, Argentina
- Height: 5 ft 11 in (180 cm)
- Weight: 240 lb (109 kg)

Rugby union career
- Position: Tighthead Prop
Senior career
Years	Team	Apps	(Points)
??–2012	Córdoba A.C.		
2012–18	Bristol Rugby	114	(35)
2018–2020	Leicester Tigers	10	(0)
2020	→Glasgow Warriors	0	(0)
2020–	Toronto Arrows	0	(0)
International career
Years	Team	Apps	(Points)
2011–14	Argentina XV	6	(0)
2019	Argentina	1	(0)
- Correct as of 10 September 2018

Rodrigo Gastón Cortés (born 6 October 1985) is an Argentinian international rugby union player who plays at prop for the Toronto Arrows of Major League Rugby (MLR).

Cortés played four times for Argentina in 2011 and 2012. He previously played over 100 games for Bristol Rugby between 2012 and 2018, and played for Leicester Tigers.

== Rugby Union career ==
=== Argentina ===
Born in Córdoba, Argentina, Cortés worked for his father's haulage company and played for Córdoba Athletic Club. Cortés made his international debut for Argentina on 22 May 2011 in the South American Rugby Championship against Chile as a replacement in a 61–6 win. He also played against Uruguay in the same year, he won his final two caps in the 2012 South American Rugby Championship featuring again in games against Chile and Uruguay.

=== Europe ===
Cortés signed for Bristol Rugby on 29 August 2012. Cortés played over 100 games for Bristol, including winning promotion from the RFU Championship twice.

After six seasons at Bristol, Cortés signed for Leicester Tigers on 18 May 2018, with the move to happen in the summer of 2018.

On 10 February 2020, it was announced that Garston would join Glasgow Warriors on a short-term loan.

=== Major League Rugby ===
In July 2020, it was confirmed that Cortés had signed for Major League Rugby side Toronto Arrows ahead of the 2021 season.
