= Carl Meyer (sportsperson, born 1991) =

South African rugby union and gridiron football player (born 1991)

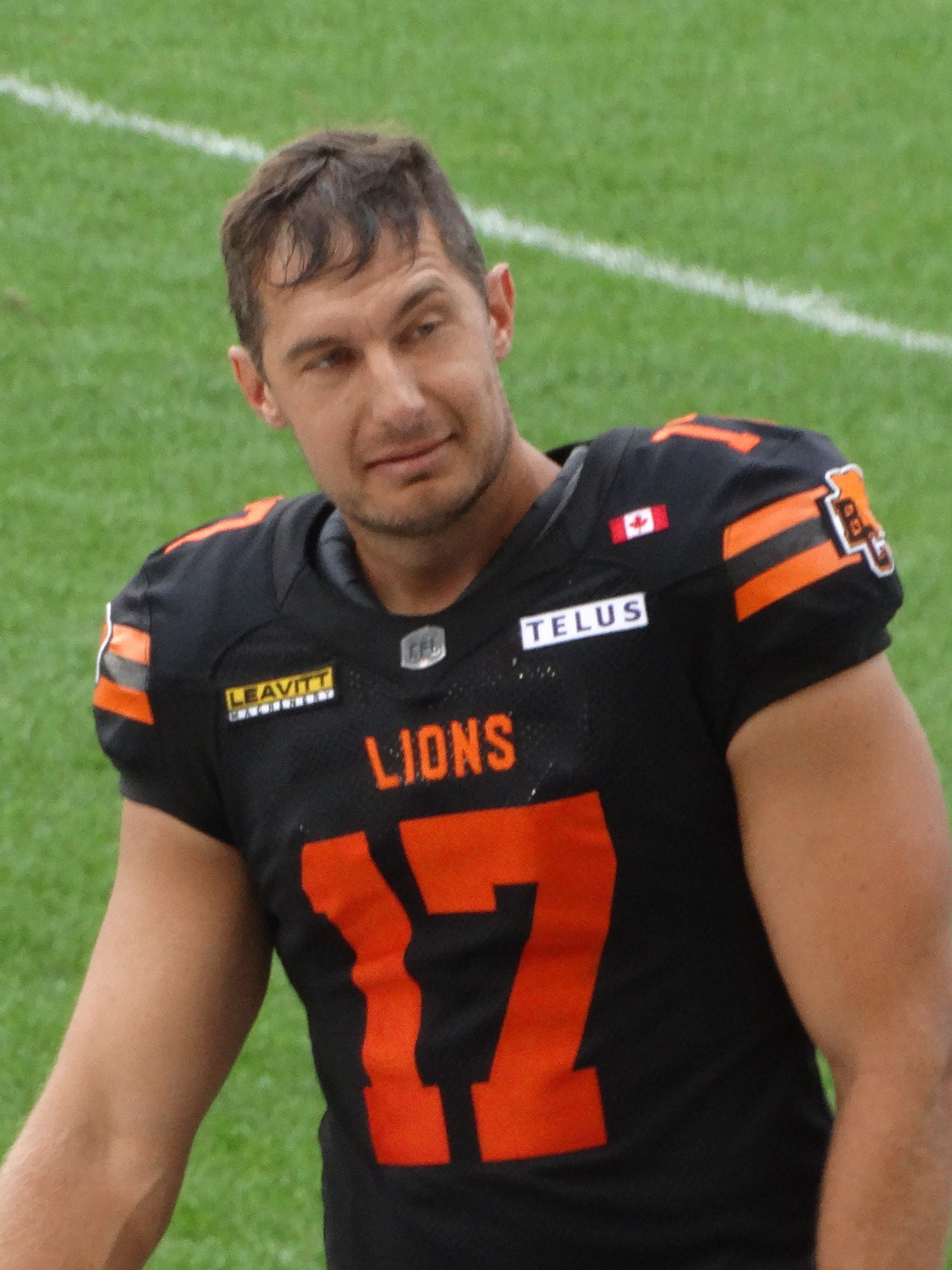
- Meyer with the BC Lions in 2025

No. 17 – BC Lions
- Position: Punter
- Roster status: Active
- CFL status: Global

Personal information
- Born: 27 May 1991 (age 35); Pietermaritzburg, South Africa
- Listed height: 6 ft 2 in (1.88 m)
- Listed weight: 235 lb (107 kg)

Career information
- College: KwaZulu-Natal
- CFL draft: 2024G: 1st round, 6th overall pick

Career history
- 2023: Jacksonville Sharks
- 2024–present: BC Lions

Awards and highlights
- NAL champion (2023)

Career CFL statistics as of 2026
- Games played: 37
- Punts: 177
- Punting yards: 8,555
- Punting average: 48.3
- Longest punt: 73
- Stats at CFL.ca

Other information

Rugby union career
Amateur team(s)
Years	Team	Apps	(Points)
2013–2015	Ebbw Vale		
2018–19	Ebbw Vale		
Senior career
Years	Team	Apps	(Points)
2014–18	Dragons	64	(75)
2020	New Orleans Gold		
- Correct as of 20 February 2020

Carl Meyer (born 27 May 1991) is a South African professional gridiron football punter for the BC Lions of the Canadian Football League (CFL). He has also played rugby union for the Dragons and NOLA Gold.

== Professional rugby career ==
Meyer made his debut for the Dragons regional team in 2014 having previously played for Ebbw Vale RFC. He was released by the Dragons at the end of the 2017–18 season. He also played as a fullback for NOLA Gold in Major League Rugby (MLR) in 2020.

== Professional gridiron career ==
=== Indoor football ===
Meyer played indoor American football as a placekicker for the Jacksonville Sharks, then of the National Arena League, in 2023. Meyer won a championship with the team in his lone season with the Sharks, where he appeared in four total games.

=== Canadian football ===
Meyer was selected by the BC Lions of the Canadian Football League (CFL) in the first round (6th overall) of the 2024 CFL global draft. On May 7, 2024, he was signed by the Lions. On Following training camp, he was re-assigned to the practice roster on June 2, 2024. Meyer made his CFL debut on 31 August 2024, against the Ottawa Redblacks, after filling in for the incumbent, Stefan Flintoft. He had four punts for a 42.3-yard average and a long of 52 in his only game played of the year.

After the Lions did not re-sign Flintoft in free agency, Meyer was named the team's punter to open the 2025 season.
