= Mungo Mason =

Scottish rugby union player (born 1995)

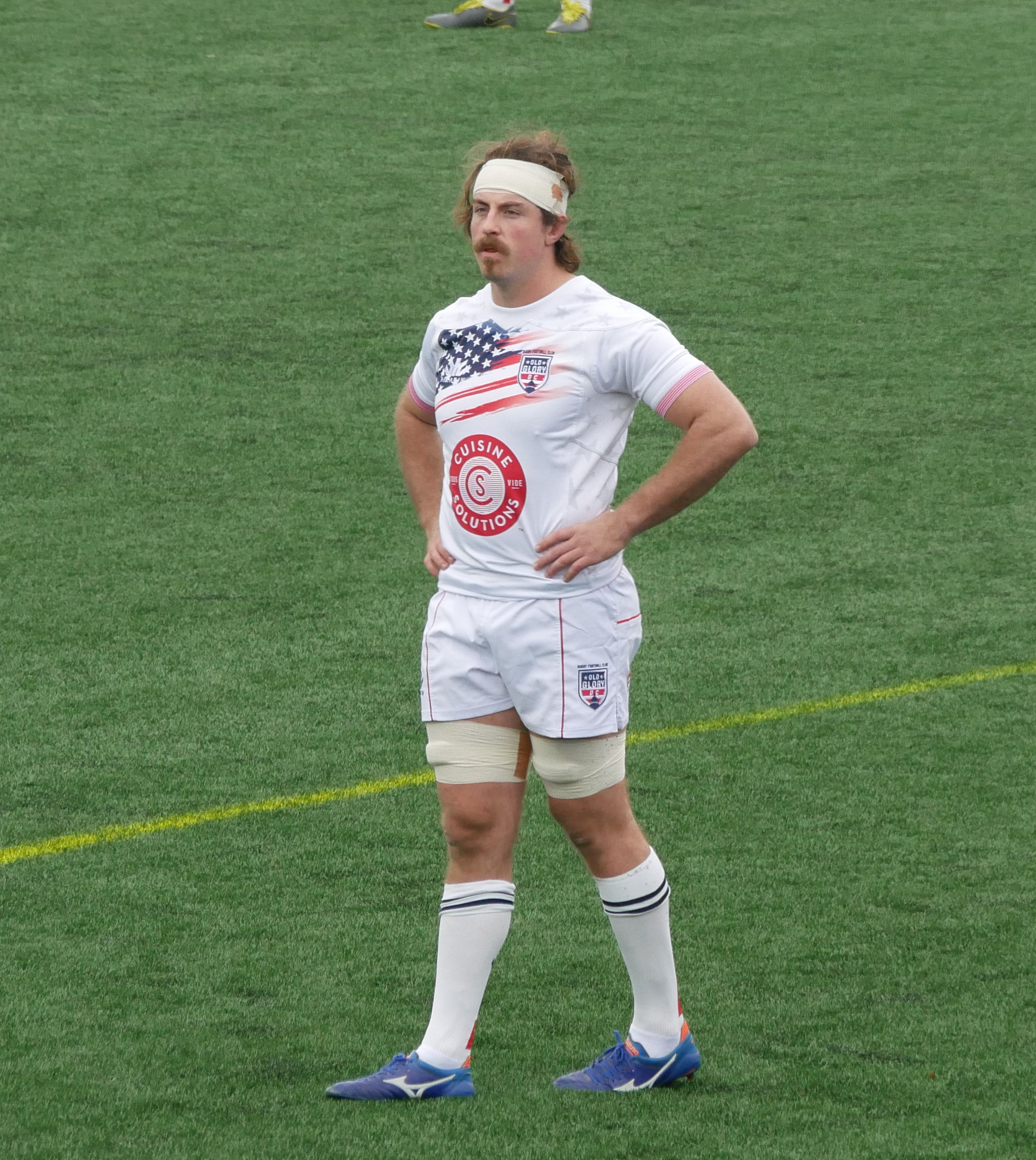
- Mungo Mason awaiting kickoff
- Born: 4 October 1995 (age 31) Carluke, Scotland
- Height: 6 ft 2 in (1.88 m)
- Weight: 218 lb (99 kg)
- School: Tauranga High School
- University: University of Waikato; Chicago-Kent College of Law

Rugby union career
- Position: Flanker / Number 8
- Current team: Zimbabwe Goshawks
Amateur team(s)
Years	Team	Apps	(Points)
2017–2018	Chicago Lions		
2019	Bay of Plenty Ngawha		
Senior career
Years	Team	Apps	(Points)
2018	San Diego Legion	0	(0)
2018–2019	Edinburgh	1	(0)
2020–2021	Old Glory DC	17	(20)
2020	Warringah Rats	9	(20)
2022–	Zimbabwe Goshawks		
National sevens team
Years	Team		Comps
2018–2019	Scotland		2

Mungo Mason (born 4 October 1995) is a Scottish professional rugby union player who plays as a flanker (back row) for Old Glory DC in Major League Rugby (MLR). He previously played for the San Diego Legion in MLR and Edinburgh in the Pro14.

== Early life ==
Born in Carluke, Scotland. His mother is Helen Mason a Senior Executive Director Commissioning at Department of Health & Human Services, Victoria. Mason was raised in New Zealand having moved to Tauranga aged 2 and lived in New Zealand until 2017 when Mungo moved to the United States to further his studies at Chicago-Kent College of Law upon the completion to his LLB degree at the University of Waikato through Sir Edmund Hillary scholarship.

== Professional career ==
While at Waikato, he was signed to play in the fledgling Major League Rugby competition in 2018 for the San Diego Legion before moving to Scotland where Mason was selected to play for Scotland in the 2018-19 World Rugby Sevens Series. He joined Old Glory DC in 2020, where he was a co-captain of the team wearing the number 7. After the 2021 season, he left to attend the University of Oxford for a Master of Sustainability, Enterprise and the Environment at St Cross College.
