= Bautista Ezcurra =

Argentine rugby union player

- Born: 21 April 1995 (age 31) Buenos Aires, Argentina
- Height: 1.81 m (5 ft 11 in)
- Weight: 90 kg (198 lb)

Rugby union career
- Position: Centre
- Current team: FC Grenoble
Amateur team(s)
Years	Team	Apps	(Points)
2013−2018	Hindú	51	(85)
Senior career
Years	Team	Apps	(Points)
2017–2020	Jaguares	27	(17)
2019	Jaguares XV	7	(5)
2021	Rugby ATL	16	(36)
2021-	FC Grenoble	46	(22)
- Correct as of 25 March 2024
International career
Years	Team	Apps	(Points)
2014–2015	Argentina Under-20	10	(5)
2015–2016	Argentina Sevens	57	(107)
2016−2019	Argentina XV	5	(0)
2018	Argentina	5	(0)
- Correct as of 29 September 2018

Bautista Ezcurra (born 21 April 1995) is an Argentine professional rugby union player. He currently plays for FC Grenoble in the French Pro D2.

He was selected for Argentina 7s's sevens squad for the 2016 Summer Olympics.

Ezcurra was named in the Jaguares training squad prior to the 2017 Super Rugby season.
