= Ross Neal =

English rugby union player

- Born: Ross John Neal; 3 December 1995 (age 30) Flackwell Heath, England
- Height: 6 ft 5 in (196 cm)
- Weight: 17 st (238 lb; 108 kg)

Rugby union career
- Position(s): Centre, Wing
- Current team: Seattle Seawolves
Senior career
Years	Team	Apps	(Points)
2014–2017	London Irish	6	(10)
2016–2018	London Scottish	27	(45)
2018–2019	Wasps	10	(40)
2020	London Irish	13	(15)
2020–present	Seattle Seawolves		
2021	Saracens		
- Correct as of 28 February 2022

Ross John Neal (born 3 December 1995) is an English rugby union player who currently plays as a wing and centre for the Seattle Seawolves in Major League Rugby (MLR). He previously played for the Saracens in the English Premiership.

== Career ==
Neal played for the London Irish under 18s and was signed on an academy contract. After limited appearances his contract was not renewed and he moved to London Scottish initially on loan but later as a permanent move. After an impressive season for London Scottish Neal was signed by Wasps in Premiership Rugby. Neal was a Wasps supporter when they played in High Wycombe.

After impressing in the cup Neal was selected for his Premiership debut on 24 November 2018 against Bristol Bears at the Ricoh Arena. Neal scored two tries and set up a second as Wasps won 32–28.

After appearing 13 times for Wasps Neal left the club in December 2019 to join the Seattle Seawolves in the USA's Major League Rugby competition.

In August 2020, Neal signed a short-term deal to return to former club London Irish for the remainder of the truncated 2019–20 season. He will return to the Seawolves once the MLR season resumes.
