= Adriaan Carelse =

South African rugby union player

- Full name: Adriaan John Carelse
- Born: 8 February 1995 (age 31) Somerset West, South Africa
- Height: 1.73 m (5 ft 8 in)
- Weight: 72 kg (11 st 5 lb; 159 lb)
- School: Hottentots Holland High School

Rugby union career
- Position: Fly-half / Fullback
- Current team: Seattle Seawolves
Youth career
- 2013–2014: Western Province
- 2015: Boland Cavaliers
Senior career
Years	Team	Apps	(Points)
2015–2018	Boland Cavaliers	54	(63)
2018–present	Free State Cheetahs	4	(2)
2019–present	Free State XV	6	(11)
2021	Rugby ATL		
2022	Dallas Jackals		
2023–	Seattle Seawolves		
- Correct as of 19 June 2022

Adriaan John Carelse (born 8 February 1995) is a South African rugby union player for the Seattle Seawolves of Major League Rugby (MLR). His regular position is fly-half of fullback. He previously played for Rugby ATL and the Dallas Jackals in the MLR.

He previously played for the Cheetahs in the Pro14, the Free State Cheetahs in the Currie Cup and the Free State XV in the Rugby Challenge.

== Rugby career ==
=== 2013–2014 : Western Province ===
Carelse was born in Somerset West. He attended and played rugby for Hottentots Holland High School, captaining their first team in 2013. He was selected to represent Western Province at the Under-18 Academy Week in the same year, kicking four conversions in his three matches.

In 2014, he was a member of the Western Province U19 squad that participated in the 2014 Under-19 Provincial Championship. He appeared in ten of their twelve matches during the regular season, scoring one try against the Golden Lions and a brace in their 43–24 victory over the Leopards as Western Province finished in third place on the log to qualify for the title play-offs. Carelse was an unused replacement in their 29–22 victory over the Free State in the semi-finals, but came on as a replacement in the final, helping his team win the title by beating the Blue Bulls U21s 33–26 in Cape Town.

=== 2015–present : Boland Cavaliers ===
Carelse moved to fellow Western Cape side Boland Cavaliers for the 2015 season. He was catapulted into their senior team that participated in the Currie Cup qualification series. He was named on the bench for their opening match of the season, a 32–22 victory over the Griffons in Malmesbury, but made his first class debut a week later, coming on as a replacement in their 17–48 defeat to Griquas in Kimberley. In his second replacement appearance a week later against the Border Bulldogs, Carelse scored his first try in first class rugby, scoring four minutes from the end in a 15–22 defeat. In his next appearance, a week later against the SWD Eagles, he scored his first points with the boot, kicking a penalty in the final minute of the match to secure a 28-all draw for his team. He was promoted to the starting lineup for the first time for their next match against the Falcons, scoring a try and a drop goal in a 29–16 victory, and also started their final match, a 17–61 defeat to the Leopards in Potchefstroom. The Boland Cavaliers won just two of their matches during the series to see them finish in fourth position, failing to qualify for the 2015 Currie Cup Premier Division, instead progressing to the First Division.

After starting two matches for the Boland U21 team in Group B of the 2015 Under-21 Provincial Championship, he returned to the first team, making two starts and two appearances as a replacement in the Currie Cup First Division. The team had a poor season, losing all five matches, and Carelse failed to score any points for the side. He returned to the Under-21 team for their final match of the regular season, converting seven of his side's fifteen tries in a 101–19 victory over Border U21 to finish secure top spot on the log. However, despite having home advantage in the semi-finals, they lost 15–19 to an SWD team that finished fourth on the log to be eliminated from the competition.

Carelse established himself as the Boland Cavaliers' first choice fly-half for the 2016 Currie Cup qualification competition, appearing in all fourteen of their matches and starting ten of those. He scored a single try during the competition in a 37–25 victory over a Sharks XV and contributed points with the boot in matches against Griquas and the Griffons. It proved to be a successful campaign under new head coach Brent Janse van Rensburg, with Boland finishing in third position in the competition to qualify for the Premier Division for the first time since 2009. He made his debut at that level in their opening match of the season, a 16–44 defeat to the Free State Cheetahs in Wellington.

Carelse signed with Rugby ATL for the 2021 Major League Rugby season.
