= Stan South =

English rugby union player

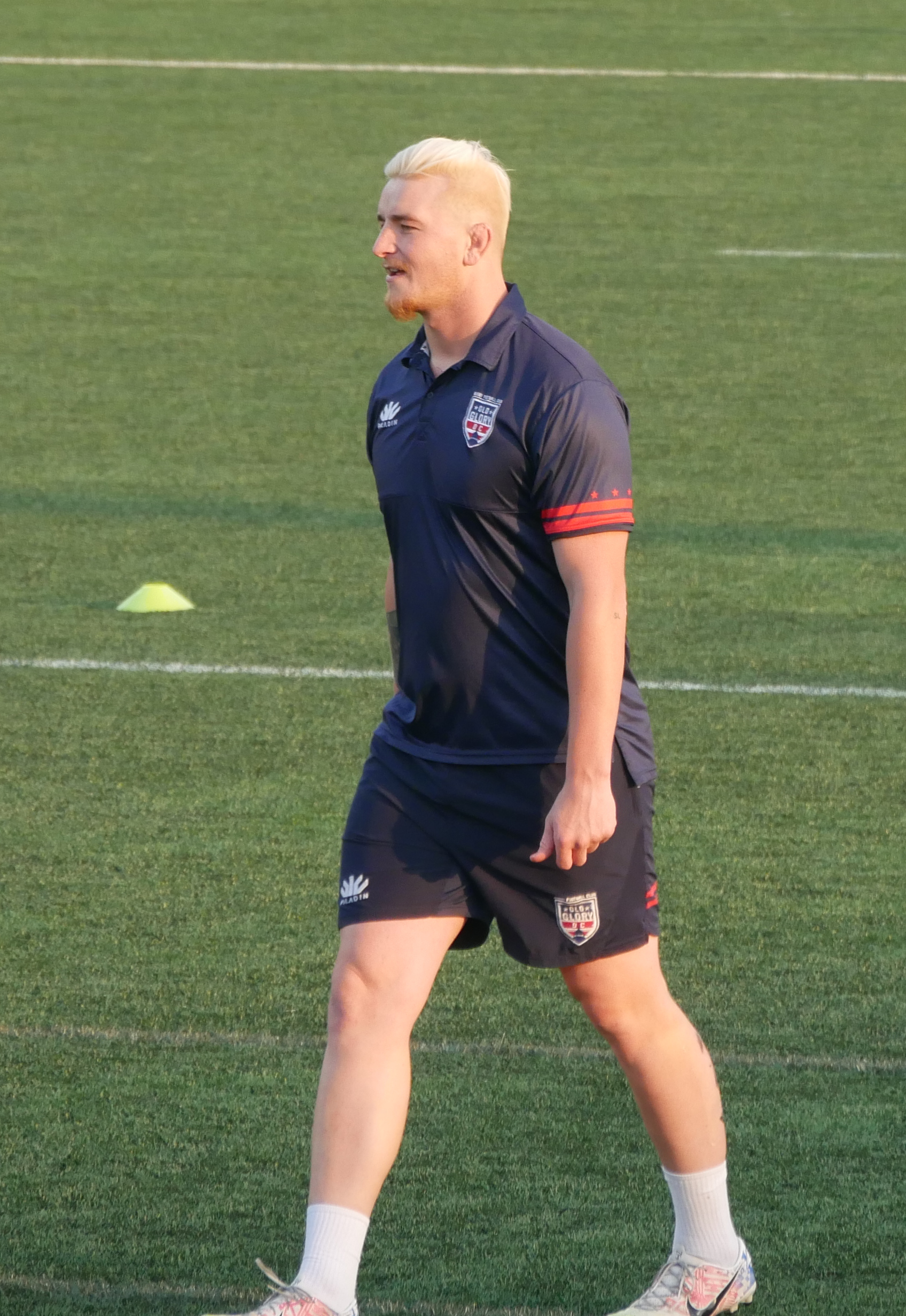
- Stan South with Old Glory DC
- Born: Stan South; 24 July 1996 (age 30) Southampton, England
- Height: 1.96 m (6 ft 5 in)
- Weight: 118 kg (18 st 8 lb; 260 lb)
- School: Whitgift School; John McGlashan College

Rugby union career
- Position: Lock
- Current team: Old Glory DC
Senior career
Years	Team	Apps	(Points)
2014–2019	Harlequins	30	(0)
2019–	Exeter Chiefs	4	(0)
2020	→ Edinburgh	0	(0)
2020–2021	Brive	3	(0)
2021-	Old Glory DC	27	(10)
- Correct as of 28 April 2022
International career
Years	Team	Apps	(Points)
2016	England U20	7	(0)

Stan South (born 24 July 1996) is an English professional rugby union player who currently plays for Old Glory DC of Major League Rugby (MLR) in the United States. He previously played lock or flanker for CA Brive.

South began his career at Harlequins and made his professional debut against Gloucester in the Anglo-Welsh Cup in 2015. He joined Exeter Chiefs on a one-year deal in 2019, despite having initially signed for Coventry. He joined Edinburgh on loan in February 2020 as cover during the Six Nations.

On 6 November 2020, South traveled to France to join Top 14 side Brive for the 2020–21 season.

Feeling stuck in his European rugby career, South travelled to the United States joined Old Glory DC in Major League Rugby for the 2021 season.

South was a member of the England under-20 team that won the 2016 World Rugby Under 20 Championship, starting the final in the second row.
