= Angus Cottrell =

Australian rugby union player

- Born: Angus Cottrell; 20 November 1989 (age 36) Brisbane, Queensland, Australia
- Height: 1.91 m (6 ft 3 in)
- Weight: 105 kg (16 st 7 lb)
- School: Brisbane Boys' College

Rugby union career
- Position: Flanker
Senior career
Years	Team	Apps	(Points)
2008–11	West Brisbane Bulldogs		
2015	Perth Spirit	6	(10)
2018–2019	Melbourne Rising	5	(10)
2021–2022	LA Giltinis	21	(70)
- Correct as of 2 March 2022
Super Rugby
Years	Team	Apps	(Points)
2012–2017	Force	56	(25)
2018–2020	Rebels	34	(20)
- Correct as of 3 November 2020

Angus Cottrell (born 20 November 1989) is an Australian former professional rugby union player. His playing position is flanker. He currently plays for the LA Giltinis of Major League Rugby (MLR).

He previously represented the Melbourne Rebels in Super Rugby.

== Early life ==
Cottrell was born in Brisbane, Australia and attended Brisbane Boys' College. His father, Nev Cottrell Jr, played representative rugby for Queensland in the late 1970s. His grandfather, Nev "Notchy" Cottrell, captained the Wallabies playing at hooker for two Tests against the British and Irish Lions in 1950.

Cottrell currently studies a Bachelor of Property and Real Estate/Bachelor of Commerce at Deakin University.

== Career ==
In 2011, while playing for West Brisbane Bulldogs in Queensland Premier Rugby, Cottrell was recruited by Super Rugby franchise the Western Force. He made his debut in Week 1 of the 2012 Super Rugby season against the Brumbies in Canberra.

Cottrell signed for the Melbourne Rebels for the 2018 Super Rugby season after failing to make the field for the Force during 2017 due to injury. After being tipped for an international debut by media during 2018, Cottrell was called into the Wallabies during the 2018 Rugby Championship as injury cover for Lukhan Tui.

Cottrell played two seasons for the LA Giltinis and was considered among the best forwards in Major League Rugby, playing a critical role in LA's successful 2021 title run. He announced his retirement from professional rugby in October 2022.

== Super Rugby statistics ==
As of 12 September 2020

Season	Team	Games	Starts	Sub	Mins	Tries	Cons	Pens	Drops	Points	Yel	Red
2012	Force	6	4	2	338	0	0	0	0	0	0	0
2013	Force	9	8	1	621	1	0	0	0	5	0	0
2014	Force	13	12	1	827	1	0	0	0	5	1	0
2015	Force	14	10	4	533	2	0	0	0	10	0	0
2016	Force	14	10	4	699	1	0	0	0	5	1	0
2017	Force	0	0	0	0	0	0	0	0	0	0	0
2018	Rebels	14	14	0	980	1	0	0	0	5	0	0
2019	Rebels	14	12	2	881	1	0	0	0	5	1	0
2020	Rebels	6	4	2	274	2	0	0	0	10	0	0
2020 AU	Rebels	0	0	0	0	0	0	0	0	0	0	0
Total		90	74	16	5312	9	0	0	0	45	3	0
