= Julián Domínguez (rugby union) =

Argentine rugby union player

- Full name: Julián Domínguez Widmer
- Born: 4 October 1996 (age 30) Buenos Aires, Argentina
- Height: 6 ft 2 in (1.88 m)
- Weight: 210 lb (95 kg; 15 st 0 lb)

Rugby union career
- Position: Winger
Amateur team(s)
Years	Team	Apps	(Points)
2015-2019	Club Pucará	51	(80)
Senior career
Years	Team	Apps	(Points)
2019	Jaguares XV	5	(40)
2020−2021	New Orleans Gold	19	(55)
2022	Austin Gilgronis		
International career
Years	Team	Apps	(Points)
2015-2016	Argentina u20s		
2016-	Argentina XV		
National sevens team
Years	Team		Comps
2017-2018	Argentina		

Julián Domínguez (born 4 October 1996) is a professional Argentine rugby union player who plays as a winger for the Chicago Hounds of Major League Rugby (MLR) in the United States. He previously played for the Austin Gilgronis and New Orleans Gold.

He previously played for the Jaguares XV in the Currie Cup, internationally for Argentina XV and for the Argentina Sevens team.
