= Tayler Adams =

New Zealand rugby union player

- Born: Tayler Adams; 24 November 1993 (age 32) Auckland, New Zealand
- Height: 1.76 m (5 ft 9 1/2 in)
- Weight: 81 kg (179 lb; 12 st 11 lb)
- School: Kelston Boys' High School
- University: Southern Institute of Technology
- Notable relative: Dan Adams (father)

Rugby union career
- Position(s): Scrum-half, Fly-half
- Current team: Toronto Arrows
Senior career
Years	Team	Apps	(Points)
2015	Greater Sydney Rams	5	(3)
2016–2017	NSW Country Eagles	17	(83)
2020–	Toronto Arrows	4	(9)
- Correct as of 15 March 2020
Provincial / State sides
Years	Team	Apps	(Points)
2012–2014, 2018–	Southland	27	(18)
- Correct as of 8 February 2019
Super Rugby
Years	Team	Apps	(Points)
2018	Rebels	2	(0)
- Correct as of 14 July 2018
International career
Years	Team	Apps	(Points)
2013	New Zealand U20	5	(10)
- Correct as of 24 April 2013

Tayler Adams (born 24 November 1993) is a New Zealand rugby union player who plays as a halfback for the Toronto Arrows in Major League Rugby (MLR). He also represents Southland in the ITM Cup.

== Career ==
He made his Southland debut in 2012, and his strong performances saw him named in the New Zealand national under-20 squad for the 2013 IRB Junior World Championship in France.

Between 2015 and 2018 he played in Australia, initially in the NRC, and in 2018 for the Melbourne Rebels in Super Rugby.

== Career ==
At the age of just 18 years he was whisked into the Stags squad in 2012 after brothers Jimmy and Scott Cowan departed. He made his debut in an 84–nil loss to Canterbury in Christchurch, and went on to also start in Southland's remaining three games of the season. He moved to Australia in 2015, playing for Greater Sydney Rams and NSW Country Eagles in the NRC, and in 2018 for the Melbourne Rebels in Super Rugby. He returned to Southland following the 2018 Super Rugby season. In 2019 he joined the Toronto Arrows ahead of the 2020 Major League Rugby season.

== Super Rugby statistics ==
As of 15 July 2018

Season	Team	Games	Starts	Sub	Mins	Tries	Cons	Pens	Drops	Points	Yel	Red
2018	Rebels	2	0	2	15	0	0	0	0	0	0	0
Total		2	0	2	15	0	0	0	0	0	0	0
