= Johan Momsen =

South African rugby union player

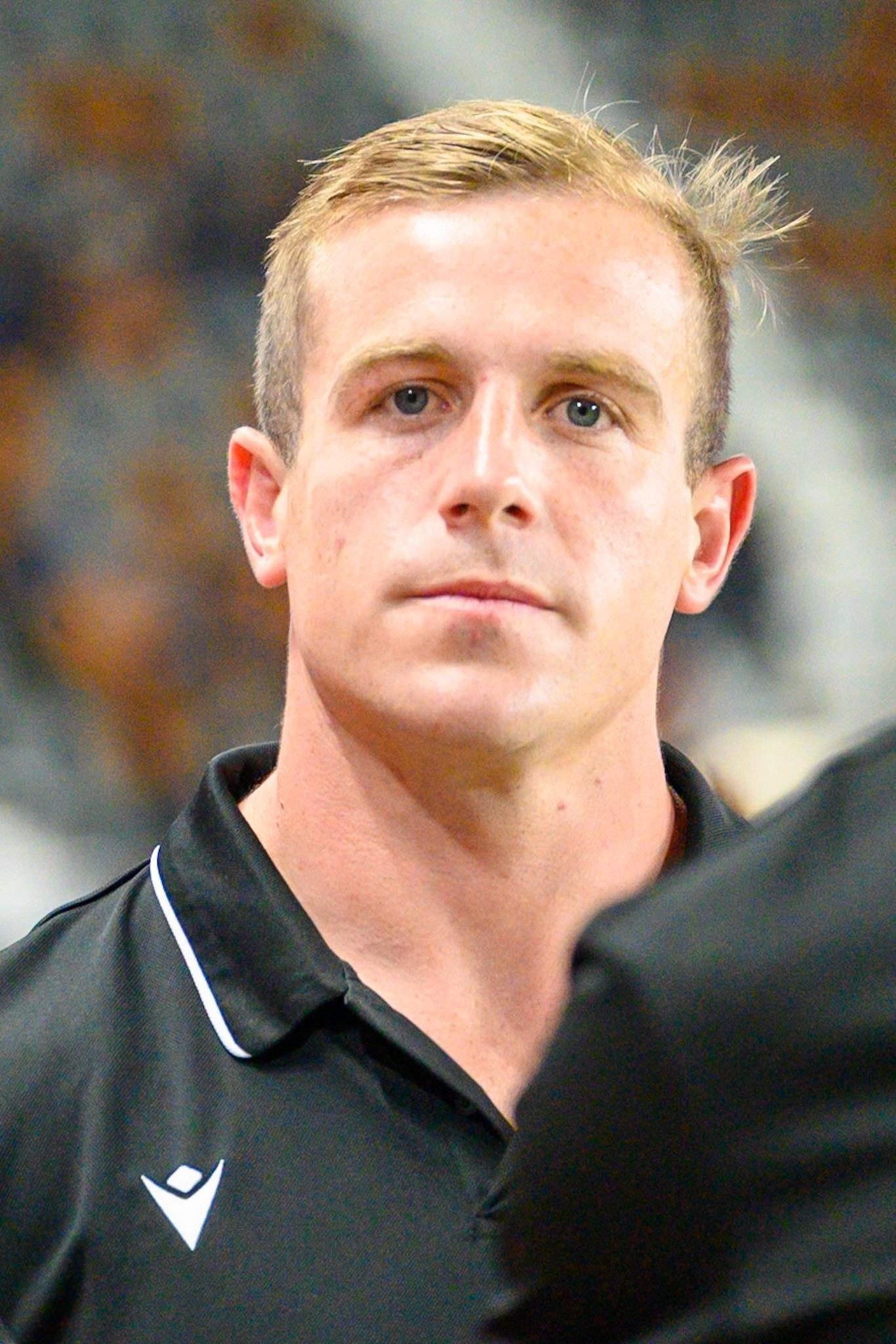
- Full name: Johannes Momsen
- Born: 21 August 1995 (age 31)
- Height: 1.96 m (6 ft 5 in)
- Weight: 113 kg (249 lb)
- School: Paarl Gimnasium
- University: University of Stellenbosch

Rugby union career
- Position: Lock
- Current team: Houston Sabercats
Amateur team(s)
Years	Team	Apps	(Points)
2015–2018	University of Stellenbosch		
Senior career
Years	Team	Apps	(Points)
2020–2023	Rugby ATL	53	(60)
2024–	Houston SaberCats	29	(20)
- Correct as of 8 July 2025
Provincial / State sides
Years	Team	Apps	(Points)
2019–2021	Griquas	22	(5)
- Correct as of 27 December 2021

Johannes Momsen (born 21 August 1995) is a South African rugby union player for Houston SaberCats of Major League Rugby (MLR).

He previously played for Griquas in the Currie Cup and the Rugby Challenge. His regular position is lock.

Momsen made his Currie Cup debut for Griquas in July 2019, coming on as a replacement lock in their opening match of the 2019 season against the Sharks.

In 2021, Momsen was named the 2021 MLR Forward of the Year.

In 2023, Momsen was traded to the Houston SaberCats in exchange for salary cap considerations.

== Honours ==
Houston SaberCats

- All Major League Ruby Second team (2025)
