= Hagen Schulte =

German rugby union player

- Born: 11 January 1993 (age 33) Christchurch, New Zealand
- Height: 1.83 m (6 ft 0 in)
- Weight: 90 kg (14 st 2 lb)
- School: St Bede's College, Christchurch
- University: Lincoln University

Rugby union career
- Position: Fly-half / Full Back
- Current team: Utah Warriors
Amateur team(s)
Years	Team	Apps	(Points)
–	Marist Albion		
2016–17	Glasgow Hawks		
2017-2018	Heidelberger RK		
2018-2019	CSM București		
Senior career
Years	Team	Apps	(Points)
2016-17	Glasgow Warriors	1	(0)
2020-2021	Utah Warriors	18	(105)
- Correct as of 10 July 2021
Provincial / State sides
Years	Team	Apps	(Points)
2015	Buller		
International career
Years	Team	Apps	(Points)
2017–	Germany	8	(0)

Hagen Schulte (born 11 January 1993 in Christchurch, New Zealand) is a rugby union player who currently plays for the Utah Warriors in Major League Rugby (MLR). Schulte usually plays as a fly-half but can also cover fullback. He previously played for Glasgow Warriors.

Born in New Zealand, Schulte was Scottish qualified to represent Scotland rugby because his grandmother is Scottish. He was also German qualified to play with the Germany national rugby union team, which later prompted a move to Germany.

== Rugby Union career ==
=== Amateur career ===
He formerly played for Marist Albion in Christchurch, New Zealand. He was top scorer in the Canterbury league before signing for the Warriors.

He also played for Canterbury at age grades.

He played for Buller province in 2015.

When not playing for Glasgow Warriors, his contract allows him to play for amateur club Glasgow Hawks.

Schulte left Scotland for the 2017-18 season to play in Germany for Heidelberger RK in the Rugby-Bundesliga.

=== Professional career ===
He trained with Glasgow Warriors in March 2016 before signing for the 2016–17 season. Schulte said on signing: "Following my trial last season, all has worked out and I’m delighted to sign for Glasgow Warriors. I try and pride myself on a running and kicking game. Coming over here and training couldn’t be more exciting."

Schulte made his debut for the Warriors in the pre-season match against Harlequins on the 20 August 2016.

He made his competitive debut for Glasgow in the Pro12 match against Scarlets on 10 February 2017.

On 4 May 2017 it was announced that Schulte would leave the club at the end of the season.

=== International career ===
In November 2017 Schulte was called up to the Germany national team for their Autumn internationals. He made his debut against the USA national side on 18 November 2017 at Full Back.
