= Renata Roberts-Tenana =

New Zealand rugby union player

- Born: 9 August 1993 (age 33) Ruatoria, New Zealand
- Height: 1.87 m (6 ft 1 1/2 in)
- Weight: 92 kg (203 lb; 14 st 7 lb)

Rugby union career
- Position(s): wing, fullback, centre
Senior career
Years	Team	Apps	(Points)
2018–2019, 2021	Northland	13	(15)
2020–2022	Old Glory DC	35	(75)
- Correct as of 2 July 2022

Renata C. Roberts-Tenana (born 9 August 1993) is a New Zealand rugby union player. His position is wing or fullback.

== Professional career ==
Roberts-Tenana signed for Major League Rugby side Old Glory DC ahead of the 2020 Major League Rugby season. He has previously represented Northland in 2 seasons of the Mitre 10 Cup. He returned to Northland during the 2021 Bunnings NPC.
