= List of 2024 Major League Rugby matches =

This article contains a list of all matches played during the 2024 MLR regular season.

== Scheduled matches ==
=== Week 1 (March 2–3) ===
March 2
16:00 EST (UTC−05:00)

New Orleans Gold	18–6	Old Glory DC
Try: Jackson-Hope 66'; Filimone 77'; Con: Botha 78'; Pen: Iona 61'; Botha 73'	Report	Pen: Robertson (2) 12' 16'; Cards: C. Daniel (yellow card) 60' to 70'

The Gold Mine
Attendance: 3,000
Referee: Luke Rogan

March 2
20:00 EST (UTC−05:00)

Houston Sabercats	22–15	Utah Warriors (1 BP)
Try: Murphy 4' van Dyk 16'; Tasi 61'; Con: Coetzer (2) 17' 62'; Pen: Coetzer 40+1'; Cards: Momsen (yellow card) 78' to end'	Report	Try: Jones 67'; Wilson 79'; Con: Hodgson 80'; Pen: Hodgson 14'; Cards: Moli (yellow card) 15' to 25'

Sabercats Stadium
Attendance: 2,908
Referee: Robin Kaluzniak

March 2
22:00 EST (UTC−05:00)

Seattle Seawolves	25–19	San Diego Legion (1 BP)
Try: Lopeti 79'; Con: Mason 80'; Pen: Mason (6) 9' 15' 20' 36' 53' 55'	Report	Try: Henderson 58'; Con: Henderson 59'; Pen: Henderson (4) 22' 26' 38' 72'; Cards: Cowan (yellow card) 19' to 29'; Payton Telea-Ilalio (red card) 52'

Starfire Stadium
Attendance: 3,000
Referee: Federico Anselmi

March 3
17:30 EST (UTC−05:00)

Miami Sharks (1BP)	19–23	Chicago Hounds
Try: McNulty 49'; Con: Etcheverry 50'; Pen: Etcheverry (4) 5' 15' 30' 65'; Cards: Ardao (yellow card) 18' to 28' van den Hoven (yellow card) 28' to 38'	Report	Try: Penalty try (2) 18' 28'; Pen: Carelse (3) 2' 8' 73'

AutoNation Field
Attendance: 4,500
Referee: Kahlil Harrison

March 3
19:00 EST (UTC−05:00)

Anthem RC	13–46	New England Free Jacks (1 BP)
Try: Gadsden 66'; Al-Jiboori 78'; Pen: Koller 15'	Report	Try: Davidowicz 3'; Quattrin 19'; MacDonald (3) 25' 46' 57'; LeSage (2) 32' 52'; Conradie 39'; Con: Potroz (2) 4' 53'; Cards: Larsen (yellow card) 15' to 25'

American Legion Memorial Stadium
Attendance: 2,307
Referee: Marquise Goodwin

March 3
20:45 EST (UTC−05:00)

RFC Los Angeles (2 BP)	29–32	Dallas Jackals (1 BP)
Try: Coe (2) 2' 27' van Vugt 11'; Damm 32'; Con: Hollinshead (3) 12' 28' 33'; Pen: Hollinshead 57'; Cards: Strang (yellow card) 40+1' to 51'; Maughan (yellow card) 40+2' to 52'; Kauika-Peterson (yellow card) 63' to 72'; Heaton (yellow card) 71' to 81'	Report	Try: Kotze (3) 19', 40+3', 72'; Richardson 44'; Con: Elías (3) 20' 40+4' 73'; Pen: Elías 7'; Drop: Elías 79'

Dignity Health Sports Park
Attendance: 400
Referee: Scott Green

=== Week 2 (March 9–10) ===
March 9
14:00 EST (UTC−05:00)

New England Free Jacks (2 BP)	34-35	Old Glory DC (1 BP)
Try: Balekana 4'; MacDonald 24'; Quattrin 38'; Wilson 45'; LeSage 54'; Con: Potroz (3) 5' 25' 39'; Pen: Potroz 11'; Cards: Keith (yellow card) 60' to 70'; Ralph (yellow card) 80' to end'	Report	Try: Vaca (3) 27' 33' 61'; Robertson 50'; Talataina 80+2'; Con: Robertson (5) 28' 34' 51' 62' 80+3'

Veterans Memorial Stadium
Attendance: 3,000
Referee: Scott Green

March 9
16:00 EST (UTC−05:00)

New Orleans Gold (1 BP)	34-19	Anthem RC
Try: Penalty try 7'; Fife 15' du Plessis 21'; Stevens 25'; Lopeti 55'; Mau'u 59'; Con: D. Jones 16'; Cards: Olajuwon Noa (red card) 74'	Report	Try: Barry 49'; Nai 61'; Al-Jiboori 66'; Con: Koller (2) 50' 62'; Cards: Leslie (yellow card) 7' to 17'

The Gold Mine
Referee: Khalil Harrison

March 9
16:00 EST (UTC−05:00)

Utah Warriors (1 BP)	29-15	Chicago Hounds
Try: Going 16'; Uhila 36'; Bradford 62'; Hamilton 79'; Con: Hodgson (3) 16' 37' 63'; Pen: Hodgson 77'	Report	Try: Domínguez 1'; Zhvania 54'; Con: Carelse 2'; Pen: Carelse 23'; Cards: Augspurger (yellow card) 16' to 26'

Zions Bank Stadium
Referee: Moe Chaudhry

March 9
22:00 EST (UTC−05:00)

Seattle Seawolves	29-18	Miami Sharks
Try: Stighling 31'; Sio 74'; Con: No kick 31'; Mason 75'; Pen: Mason (5) 4' 14' 24' 28' 64'; Cards: Elton (yellow card) 76' to end'	Report	Try: Bonasso 42'; Casares 77'; Con: Videla 78'; Pen: Etcheverry 18'; Videla 52'; Cards: Etete (yellow card) 27' to 37'

Starfire Stadium
Referee: Cisco Lopez

March 10
16:00 EDT (UTC−04:00)

Dallas Jackals (1 BP)	23-30	San Diego Legion (1 BP)
Try: Oliver 5'; Golla 73'; Steeves 80+3'; Con: Isaacs 6'; Pen: Isaacs (2) 25' 34'	Report	Try: Nonu 9'; Cowan 46'; Brache 54'; Grayson 59'; Con: McClutchie (2) 55' 60'; Pen: McClutchie (2) 16' 40'; Cards: Leuta (yellow card) 58' to 68'

Choctaw Stadium
Referee: Greg Gilliam

March 10
18:00 EDT (UTC−04:00)

RFC Los Angeles	12-27	Houston SaberCats
Try: Amiras 8'; Saunders 32'; Con: Hollinshead 8'	Report	Try: Nasoqeqe 18'; Redelinghuys 34'; Warner 65'; Con: Coetzer (3) 19' 35' 66'; Pen: Coetzer (2) 46' 60'

Dignity Health Sports Park
Referee: Derek Summers

=== Week 3 (March 16–17) ===
March 16
14:00 EDT (UTC−04:00)

New England Free Jacks	27-21	New Orleans Gold (1 BP)
Try: van der Bank 32'; MacDonald 51'; LeSage 77'; Con: Potroz (3) 33' 52' 78'; Pen: Potroz (2) 56' 65'	Report	Try: Filimone 13'; Jackson-Hope (2) 22' 80+2'; Con: Iona (2) 14' 23'; Botha 80+3'; Cards: Salmon (yellow card) 1' to 11'

Veterans Memorial Stadium
Attendance: 4,051
Referee: Cisco Lopez

March 16
16:00 EDT (UTC−04:00)

Old Glory DC	22-22	Chicago Hounds
Try: Vaca 17'; Müller (2) 26' 51'; Con: Robertson 18'; No kick 26'; Pen: Robertson 48'; Cards: Faʻanana-Schultz (red card) 28'	Report	Try: Boomer (2) 24' 44'; Zhvania 56'; Con: No kick 24'; Carelse 45'; Pen: Carelse 13'; Cards: Ryan (yellow card) 74' to end'

Maryland Soccerplex
Attendance: 2,500
Referee: Federico Anselmi

March 16
20:00 EDT (UTC−04:00)

Houston SaberCats (1 BP)	30-19	Miami Sharks
Try: Warner 14'; Nasoqeqe 20'; Misailegalu 57'; Penalty try 80+1'; Con: Alatimu 21'; No kick 80+1'; Pen: Alatimu (2) 39' 70'; Cards: Lindenmuth (yellow card) 35' to 45'	Report	Try: Bonasso 64'; Con: Etcheverry 65'; Pen: Etcheverry (4) 17' 25' 29' 36'; Cards: Inciarte (yellow card) 19' to 29'

SaberCats Stadium
Referee: Lex Weiner

March 16
21:00 EDT (UTC−04:00)

Utah Warriors	13-23	Seattle Seawolves
Try: Lochore 37'; Bradford 80+2'; Pen: Hodgson 2'	Report	Try: Pulu 23'; Taufete'e 30'; Stighling 42'; Con: Mason 31'; Pen: Mason (2) 8' 18'

Zions Bank Stadium
Referee: Luke Rogan

March 16
22:00 EDT (UTC−04:00)

San Diego Legion	19-18	RFC Los Angeles (1 BP)
Try: Brache 31'; Con: McClutchie 32'; Pen: McClutchie (4) 54' 69' 67' 76'; Cards: Cowan (yellow card) 16' to 26'	Report	Try: van Vuuren 20'; Stokes 78'; Con: Hollinshead 79'; Pen: Hollinshead 7' 42'; Cards: Maughan (yellow card) 47' to 57'

Snapdragon Stadium
Attendance: 10,000
Referee: Robin Kaluzniak

March 17
15:00 EDT (UTC−04:00)

Anthem RC (1 BP)	28-68	Dallas Jackals (1 BP)
Try: Turnbull 26'; Basser 41'; Shetler 49'; Penalty try 63'; Con: Koller (2) 27' 50'; No kick (2) 41' 63'; Cards: Barry (yellow card) 70' to 80'	Report	Try: Richardson 5'; Isaacs 9'; Oliver 14'; Benn 22'; Kotze 39'; Foley 43'; Gómez Vara 72'; Fuala'au 76'; Elías 79'; Bekerman 80+1'; Con: No kick (2) 5' 79'; Elías (7) 10' 23' 40' 44' 72' 77' 80+2'; Cards: Fry (yellow card) 18' to 28'; Isaacs (yellow card) 63' to 73'

American Legion Memorial Stadium
Referee: Moe Chaudhry

=== Week 4 (March 22–24) ===
March 22
22:30 EDT (UTC−04:00)

Seattle Seawolves (2 BP)	40-42	Houston SaberCats (1 BP)
Try: Stighling (2) 23' 79'; Mason 43'; Taufete'e (2) 56' 59'; Futi 74'; Con: Mason (2) 57' 60'; Pen: Mason 8'; Windsor 67'; Cards: Futi (yellow card) 25' to 35'; Mason (yellow card) 64' to 74'	Report	Try: Momsen 16'; Murphy 34'; Anae Ah-Sue 47'; Penalty try 64'; Tasi 72'; Con: Alatimu (3) 17' 35' 73'; No kick 64'; Pen: Alatimu (3) 20' 26' 40'; Cards: Lindenmuth (yellow card) 33' to 43'; Nasoqeqe (yellow card) 77' to end'

Starfire Sports Complex
Referee: Moe Chaudhry

March 23
16:00 EDT (UTC−04:00)

Old Glory DC	11-27	San Diego Legion (1 BP)
Try: Rizzo 40'; Pen: Robertson (2) 18' 27'; Cards: Martinez (yellow card) 63' to 73'	Report	Try: Loots 4'; Helu 45'; Roach 64'; Kearns 80+1'; Con: McClutchie (2) 5' 80+2'; Pen: McClutchie 73'

Maryland Soccerplex
Referee: George Myers

March 23
19:00 EDT (UTC−04:00)

Miami Sharks (1 BP)	50-21	Anthem RC
Try: O'Leary 4'; Ardao (2) 10' 48'; McNulty 12'; Grigg 32'; Videla 40+1'; Etcheverry 58'; Con: Etcheverry (5) 5' 11' 13' 33' 59'; No kick 48'; Pen: Etcheverry 29'	Report	Try: Waitokia 16'; Singh 36'; Shetler 49'; Con: No kick 16'; Koller (2) 37' 50'

AutoNation Field
Attendance: 3,000
Referee: Federico Anselmi

March 23
20:30 EDT (UTC−04:00)

Dallas Jackals	22-35	New Orleans Gold (1 BP)
Try: Golla 33'; Penalty try 40+2'; Torres 72'; Con: No kick 40+2'; Elías 73'; Drop: Elías 12'; Cards: Fry (yellow card) 19' to 29'	Report	Try: Filimone (2) 16' 38'; Fidow 21'; Iona 26'; Campbell 31'; Con: Iona (2) 22' 27'; Pen: Iona (2) 20' 79'; Cards: Adams (red card) 14'

Choctaw Stadium
Referee: Marquise Goodwin

March 24
14:00 EDT (UTC−04:00)

Chicago Hounds (1 BP)	17-22	New England Free Jacks
Try: Penalty try 32'; Jones 79'; Con: No kick 32'; Carelse 79'; Pen: Carelse 70'		Try: Potroz (2) 16' 38'; Hala-Ngatai 76'; Con: Potroz 17'; No kick 76'; Pen: Potroz 50'; Cards: MacDonald (yellow card) 32' to 42'

SeatGeek Stadium
Attendance: 3,000
Referee: Luke Rogan

March 24
18:00 EDT (UTC−04:00)

RFC Los Angeles (1 BP)	36-32	Utah Warriors (2 BP)
Try: Coe (2) 12' 68'; Damm 28'; Kauika-Petersen 42'; Kunatani 49'; Con: Hollinshead (3) 13' 29' 43'; No kick 50'; Pen: Hollinshead 19'; Cards: van Vuuren (yellow card) 8' to 18'		Try: I. Kruse 6'; Mano 36'; Souchon (2) 55' 74'; Manson 80'; Con: Hodgson (2) 75' 80'; Pen: Hodgson 31'

Dignity Health Sports Park
Attendance: 1,100
Referee: Cisco Lopez

=== Week 5 (March 29–31) ===
March 29
20:30 EDT (UTC−04:00)

Dallas Jackals (2 BP)	27-30	Houston SaberCats (1 BP)
Try: Muller 6'; Isaacs 24'; Richardson 40+5'; Alikhan 45'; Steeves 74'; Con: Isaacs 75'; Cards: Bur (yellow card) 12' to 22'	Report	Try: Murphy 2'; Albert (2) 17' 49'; Anae Ah-Sue 43'; Con: Coetzer (2) 3' 18'; Pen: Coetzer (2) 61' 79'; Cards: Redelinghuys (yellow card) 71' to 81'

Choctaw Stadium
Attendance: 700
Referee: George Myers

March 30
18:00 EDT (UTC−04:00)

Chicago Hounds (1 BP)	26-34	Seattle Seawolves (1 BP)
Try: Brown (2) 4' 19'; Domínguez 16'; Flesch 27'; Con: Carelse (3) 17' 20' 28'; Cards: Meakes (yellow card) 30' to 40'	Report	Try: Stighling 33'; Mason 40'; Smith 43'; Windsor 48'; Pulu 79'; Con: Mason (3) 40+1' 44' 80'; Pen: Mason 75'; Cards: Rossouw (yellow card) 36' to 46'; Taylor (yellow card) 54' to 64'

SeatGeek Stadium
Referee: Derek Summers

March 30
18:00 EDT (UTC−04:00)

Anthem RC (1 BP)	32-46	Old Glory DC (1 BP)
Try: Turnbull 38'; Waitokia 40'; Gafa 57'; Still 80'; Con: Koller (3) 39' 40+1' 58'; Pen: Koller (2) 3' 14'	Report	Try: B. Daniel 18'; Rizzo (2) 21' 73'; Gattas (2) 47' 62'; Müller 52'; Con: Robertson (4) 19' 22' 48' 63'; Bowd 74'; Pen: Robertson (2) 27' 44'; Cards: Müller (yellow card) 35' to 45'

American Legion Memorial Stadium
Referee: Lex Weiner

March 31
18:00 EDT (UTC−04:00)

Miami Sharks (1 BP)	21-22	San Diego Legion
Try: Etcheverry 35'; Inciarte 50'; Con: No kick 35'; Pen: Etcheverry (3) 10' 18' 22'	Report	Try: Roach 14'; Grayson 60'; Tupai 64'; Con: No kick 60'; McClutchie 65'; Pen: McClutchie 72'; Cards: Roach (yellow card) 30' to 40'

AutoNation Field
Referee: Luke Rogan

=== Week 6 (April 5–6) ===
April 5
21:00 EDT (UTC−04:00)

Utah Warriors (1 BP)	44–19	Anthem RC
Try: Souchon (2) 3' 53'; Manson (2) 18' 60'; Kruse 25'; Nel 72'; Lochore (2) 76' 80+2'; Con: Hodgson (2) 73' 77'; Cards: Souchon (yellow card) 40+2' to 50'	Report	Try: Barry 12'; Still 21'; Gafa 38'; Con: Koller (2) 13' 39'; Cards: Rivers (yellow card) 17' to 27'; Murray (yellow card) 77' to 80+2'

Zions Bank Stadium
Referee: Robin Kaluzniak (Canada)

April 5
22:30 EDT (UTC−04:00)

Seattle Seawolves (1 BP)	34–32	Dallas Jackals (2 BP)
Try: Kriel 25'; Haini 31'; Penalty try 51'; Donald 70'; Con: Mason (3) 26' 32' 71'; No kick 51'; Pen: Mason (2) 10' 79'	Report	Try: Kotze (5) 22' 35' 40' 48' 55'; Con: Isaacs (2) 36' 56'; Pen: Isaacs 17'; Cards: Winchester 51'

Starfire Sports Complex
Referee: Scott Green (USA)

April 6
16:00 EDT (UTC−04:00)

New Orleans Gold	21–38	Chicago Hounds (1 BP)
Try: Böhme 13'; Fidow 40'; Campbell 44'; Con: Iona (3) 14' 40+1' 45'; Cards: Paranihi (red card) 54'; Fife (yellow card) 57' to 67'	Report	Try: Scott (2) 22' 78'; Péculo 42'; Fawsitt (2) 52' 57'; Venter 69'; Con: Carelse (4) 43' 53' 58' 70'; Cards: Ryan (yellow card) 72' to 80'

The Gold Mine
Attendance: 2,500
Referee: George Myers (Australia)

April 6
16:30 EDT (UTC−04:00)

New England Free Jacks	25–3	Miami Sharks
Try: Larsen 4' von Dadelszen 41'; Nordli-Kelemeti 51'; Con: Potroz (2) 5' 52'; Pen: Potroz (2) 12' 24'	Report	Pen: Etcheverry 9'

Veterans Memorial Stadium
Referee: Derek Summers (USA)
Jarrod Ford (USA)

April 6
17:00 EDT (UTC−04:00)

Old Glory DC	22–22	RFC Los Angeles
Try: McVeigh 22'; C. Daniel 32'; Talataina 51'; Con: Robertson (2) 23' 33'; Pen: Robertson 59'	Report	Try: Hollinshead 5'; Leonard 15'; Damm 66'; Saunders 72'; Con: Hollinshead 67'; Cards: Vukašinović (yellow card) 13' to 23'; Maughan (yellow card) 20' (yellow-red card) 39'; Coe (yellow card) 38' to 48'; Katjijeko (yellow card) 79' to end'

Maryland Soccerplex
Referee: Moe Chaudhry (Canada)

=== Week 7 (April 12–14) ===
April 12
20:30 EDT (UTC−04:00)

Dallas Jackals	22–20	Utah Warriors (1 BP)
Try: Benn 2'; Malanos 30'; Bekerman 80'; Con: Winchester (2) 3' 31'; Pen: Winchester 53'	Report	Try: M. Kruse 14'; Manson 67'; Con: Hodgson (2) 15' 68'; Pen: Hodgson (2) 9' 55'; Cards: Prior (yellow card) 52' to 62'

Choctaw Stadium
Referee: Chris Assmus (Canada)

April 13
20:00 EDT (UTC−04:00)

Houston SaberCats (1 BP)	35–47	New England Free Jacks (1 BP)
Try: Dyer 4'; Misailegalu 25'; Coetzer (2) 33' 59'; Latu 67'; Erasmus 74'; Con: Alatimu 75'; Pen: Coetzer 21'	Report	Try: Hala-Ngatai 7'; Conradie 11'; Potroz 23' van der Bank (3) 40' 51' 77'; MacDonald 48'; Con: Potroz (6) 8' 12' 24' 40+1' 52' 78'; Cards: van der Bank (yellow card) 25' to 35'

SaberCats Stadium
Referee: Federico Anselmi (Argentina)

April 14
16:00 EDT (UTC−04:00)

San Diego Legion (1 BP)	33–20	New Orleans Gold
Try: Aoake 48'; Tupai 52'; Cama 74'; Penalty try 77'; Loots 79'; Con: McClutchie (2) 49' 53'; No kick (2) 74' 77'; Cards: Tupai (yellow card) 40+2' to 50'	Report	Try: Fidow 12'; Waguespack 33'; Con: D. Jones (2) 13' 34'; Pen: D. Jones (2) 37' 65'; Cards: Filimone (yellow card) 40+2' to 50'; O'Toole (yellow card) 77' to end'

Snapdragon Stadium
Referee: Cisco Lopez (USA)

April 14
16:00 EDT (UTC−04:00)

Chicago Hounds (1 BP)	59–26	Anthem RC (1 BP)
Try: Fawsitt (3) 6' 19' 40'; Higgins (3) 12' 52' 58'; Augspurger 24'; Matarazzo 76'; Venter 80+1'; Con: Carelse (5) 7' 13' 20' 53' 59'; Dooley (2) 77' 80+2'	Report	Try: Waitokia 27'; Fortune 36'; Koller 55'; Apikotoa 61'; Con: Koller 28'; No kick (2) 55' 61'

SeatGeek Stadium
Referee: Kahlil Harrison (USA)

April 14
18:00 EDT (UTC−04:00)

RFC Los Angeles	5-36	Seattle Seawolves (1 BP)
Try: Strang 45'; Cards: Saunders (yellow card) 58' to 68'	Report	Try: Hattingh (2) 27' 69'; Windsor 32'; Rossouw 59'; Pulu 80'; Con: Windsor (3) 28' 33' 60'; No kick 80'; Pen: Windsor 18'

Dignity Health Sports Park
Referee: George Myers (Australia)

=== Week 8 (April 20–21) ===
April 20
14:00 EDT (UTC−04:00)

New England Free Jacks	21–29	Seattle Seawolves
Try: van der Bank 21'; Penalty try 68'; Geiger 72'; Con: Potroz (2) 22' 73'; No kick 68'	Report	Try: Kriel 39'; Pryor 53'; Hattingh 56'; Con: Mason 57'; Pen: Mason (4) 2' 23' 31' 70'; Cards: Pryor (yellow card) 19' to 29'; Taufete'e (yellow card) 68' to 78'

Veterans Memorial Stadium
Referee: Luke Rogan (USA)

April 20
16:00 EDT (UTC−04:00)

New Orleans Gold (1 BP)	27–42	Miami Sharks (1 BP)
Try: Botha 18'; May 25'; Mau'u 56'; Filimone 69'; Con: Botha 26'; Iona 70'; Pen: Botha 2'; Cards: Noa (yellow card) 44' to 54'; Adams (yellow card) 78' to end' Feakes (red card) 80'	Report	Try: Hand 7'; Grigg (2) 15' 46'; Piussi 30'; Young 49'; Con: Videla (3) 8' 31' 47'; No kick 49'; Pen: Videla (3) 40' 79' 80+1'; Cards: McDonnell (yellow card) 68' to 78'; Grigg (yellow card) 76' to end'

The Gold Mine
Referee: Kat Roche (USA)

April 20
17:00 EDT (UTC−04:00)

Old Glory DC	17–38	Houston SaberCats (1 BP)
Try: C. Daniel 23'; Naqali 52'; Con: Robertson 24'; No kick 52'; Pen: Robertson 10'; Cards: Harley (yellow card) 26' to 36'	Report	Try: Coetzer 13'; Dyer 19' van Dyk 27' van Wyk 37'; Akina 73'; Con: Alatimu (5) 14' 20' 28' 38' 74'; Pen: Alatimu 7'

Maryland Soccerplex
Referee: Scott Green (USA)

April 21
18:00 EDT (UTC−04:00)

Chicago Hounds (1 BP)	54–31	RFC Los Angeles (1 BP)
Try: Augspurger (3) 2' 59' 80'; Landry (2) 11' 35'; Fawsitt 17'; Brown 61'; Flesch 67'; Con: Carelse (4) 18' 36' 62' 68'; No kick (2) 11' 33'; Dooley 80+1'; Cards: Jones (yellow card) 70' to 80'	Report	Try: van Vugt 20'; Hollinshead 24'; Saunders 52'; Kunatani 71'; Shaw 77'; Con: Hollinshead 25'; No kick (2) 52' 71'; Cards: Kunatani (yellow card) 19' to 29'

SeatGeek Stadium
Referee: Marquise Goodwin (USA)

April 21
18:00 EDT (UTC−04:00)

San Diego Legion (2 BP)	32–33	Utah Warriors
Try: Tupai 21'; Tameilau 42'; Te'o 56'; Cama 59'; Con: No kick 21'; McClutchie (2) 43' 60'; Pen: McClutchie (2) 4' 65'; Cards: Mickelson (yellow card) 35' to 45'; Tuivaiti (yellow card) 51' to 61'	Report	Try: Makene 28'; Manson (2) 40' 47'; Con: Hodgson (3) 29' 40+1' 48'; Pen: Hodgson (4) 37' 45' 52' 75'; Cards: Uhila (yellow card) 17' to 27'

Snapdragon Stadium
Referee: Lex Weiner (USA)

=== Week 9 (April 26–28) ===
April 26
21:00 EDT (UTC−04:00)

Utah Warriors (1 BP)	31–24	Old Glory DC (2 BP)
Try: Lochore 8'; Nel 14'; M. Kruse 25'; McClea 52'; Con: Hodgson (4) 9' 15' 26' 53'; Pen: Hodgson 77'; Cards: Lochore (yellow card) 68' to 78'; Bradford (yellow card) 78' to end'	Report	Try: Iscaro 31'; Robertson 61'; Penalty try 69'; Vaca 80'; Con: Robertson 62'; No kick 69'

Zions Bank Stadium
Referee: Federico Anselmi (Argentina)

April 27
19:30 EDT (UTC−04:00)

Anthem RC	5–40	New Orleans Gold (1 BP)
Try: Still 5'; Cards: Still (yellow card) 33' to 43'; Singh (yellow card) 46' to 56'	Report	Try: Iona 18'; Campbell 23'; D. Jones 34'; Depperschmidt 40'; Filimone (2) 47' 73'; Con: D. Jones (3) 19' 35' 48'; No kick 23'; Botha 74'

Truist Point
Referee: Marquise Goodwin (USA)

April 27
19:30 EDT (UTC−04:00)

Miami Sharks	17–38	Dallas Jackals (1 BP)
Try: Hand 48' du Toit 68'; Young 78'; Con: Videla 49'	Report	Try: Gómez Vara 5'; Alikhan 22'; Winchester 31'; Tidwell 42'; Malanos 52'; Torres 70'; Con: Elías (3) 6' 23' 53'; No kick 31'; Cards: Bekerman (red card) 75'

AutoNation Field
Referee: Scott Green (USA)

April 27
20:00 EDT (UTC−04:00)

Houston SaberCats (1 BP)	33–0	San Diego Legion
Try: Murphy (2) 13' 61'; Latu 27'; Penalty try 69'; Seth Smith 72'; Con: Coetzer (3) 14' 28' 62'; No kick 69'; Cards: Erasmus (yellow card) 40' to 50'	Report	Cards: Breen (yellow card) 26' to 36'; Ross (yellow card) 57' to 67'; Grayson (yellow card) 69' to 79'

SaberCats Stadium
Referee: Luke Rogan (USA)

April 28
17:00 EDT (UTC−04:00)

RFC Los Angeles	12–34	New England Free Jacks (1 BP)
Try: Shaw 38'; Kunatani 52'; Con: Hollinshead 39'; Cards: Kunatani (yellow card) 25' to 35'	Report	Try: Quattrin 14'; Baker 21'; Morgan-Puterangi (2) 30' 78'; MacDonald 44'; Con: No kick 14'; Potroz (2) 45' 79'; Pen: Potroz 74'

Dignity Health Sports Park
Referee: Robin Kaluzniak (Canada)

=== Week 10 (May 3–5) ===
May 3
22:30 EDT (UTC−04:00)

Seattle Seawolves (1 BP)	29–13	Anthem RC
Try: Perry 11'; Taufete'e 54'; Windsor 58'; Taylor 67'; Con: Windsor (3) 12' 59' 68'; Pen: Windsor 26'; Cards: Orr (yellow card) 60' to 70'; Pryor (yellow card) 80' to end'	Report	Try: Iacovino 40+1'; Waitokia 80+3'; Pen: Loubser 23'

Starfire Sports Complex
Referee: Chris Assmus (Canada)

May 4
18:00 EDT (UTC−04:00)

Old Glory DC	13–10	Miami Sharks (1 BP)
Try: Talataina 17'; Müller 57'; Pen: Robertson 78'	Report	Try: Ardao 40'; Con: No kick 40'; Pen: Videla 56'; Cards: Ardao (yellow card) 17' to 27'; Sole (yellow card) 21' to 31'; Grigg (yellow card) 78' to end'

Maryland Soccerplex
Referee: Marquise Goodwin (USA)

May 4
21:00 EDT (UTC−04:00)

Utah Warriors (1 BP)	24–29	Houston SaberCats (1 BP)
Try: Lochore 52'; Jensen 59'; Bradford 74'; Con: Hodgson (3) 53' 60' 75'; Pen: Hodgson 38'; Cards: Souchon (yellow card) 31' to 41'	Report	Try: Seth Smith 32'; Hill 42'; Wild 47'; Akina 61'; Con: Alatimu (3) 33' 48' 62'; Pen: Alatimu 26'; Cards: Nasoqeqe (yellow card) 54' to 64'; Hill (yellow card) 56' to 66'

Zions Bank Stadium
Referee: Lex Weiner (USA)

May 5
12:00 EDT (UTC−04:00)

New England Free Jacks (1 BP)	20–26	Chicago Hounds
Try: Baker 15'; Balekana (2) 43' 64'; Con: Morgan-Puterangi 65'; Pen: Potroz 27'; Cards: Baker (yellow card) 35' to 45'	Report	Try: Jones (2) 8' 41'; Fawsitt 37'; Con: Carelse 42'; Pen: Carelse (3) 21' 53' 60'

Veterans Memorial Stadium
Referee: Federico Anselmi (Argentina)

May 5
18:00 EDT (UTC−04:00)

San Diego Legion	30–24	Dallas Jackals (1 BP)
Try: Afungia 17'; James 23'; Sears-Duru 78'; Con: McClutchie (2) 18' 24'; Giteau 79'; Pen: McClutchie (2) 13' 57'; Giteau 64'	Report	Try: Gómez Vara (2) 7' 54'; Isaacs 21'; Malanos 66'; Con: Elías (2) 8' 55'; Cards: Bur (yellow card) 68' to 78'; Horcada (yellow card) 77' to end'

Snapdragon Stadium
Referee: Derek Summers (USA)

=== Week 11 (May 10–11) ===
May 10
19:00 EDT (UTC−04:00)

Anthem RC	15–38	Houston SaberCats
	Report

American Legion Memorial Stadium
Referee: Amelia Luciano (USA)

May 10
20:30 EDT (UTC−04:00)

Dallas Jackals	26–29	RFC Los Angeles
	Report

Choctaw Stadium
Referee: Kat Roche (USA)

May 11
15:00 EDT (UTC−04:00)

New Orleans Gold	32–31	Seattle Seawolves

The Gold Mine

May 11
18:00 EDT (UTC−04:00)

Chicago Hounds	21–22	Old Glory DC

SeatGeek Stadium

May 11
19:30 EDT (UTC−04:00)

Miami Sharks	20–19	Utah Warriors

AutoNation Field

=== Week 12 (May 18–19) ===
May 18
19:00 EDT (UTC−04:00)

Anthem RC	29-33	RFC Los Angeles

American Legion Memorial Stadium

May 18
20:00 EDT (UTC−04:00)

New Orleans Gold	21-14	Utah Warriors

The Gold Mine

May 18
20:00 EDT (UTC−04:00)

Houston SaberCats	23-22	Chicago Hounds

SaberCats Stadium

May 19
16:00 EDT (UTC−04:00)

San Diego Legion	23-24	New England Free Jacks

Snapdragon Stadium

May 19
19:00 EDT (UTC−04:00)

Dallas Jackals	14-7	Seattle Seawolves
	Report

Choctaw Stadium
Referee: Andrew Cole (Ireland)

=== Week 13 (May 24–26) ===
May 24
22:30 EDT (UTC−04:00)

Seattle Seawolves	26-24	Old Glory DC
	Report

Starfire Sports Complex
Referee: Damián Schneider (Argentina)

May 25
19:00 EDT (UTC−04:00)

Miami Sharks	15-13	New England Free Jacks
	Report

AutoNation Field
Referee: Andrew Cole (Ireland)

May 26
14:00 EDT (UTC−04:00)

Chicago Hounds	13-25	New Orleans Gold
	Report

SeatGeek Stadium
Referee: Luke Rogan (USA)

May 26
18:00 EDT (UTC−04:00)

RFC Los Angeles	19–27	San Diego Legion
	Report

Dignity Health Sports Park
Referee: Federico Anselmi (Argentina)

=== Week 14 (June 1–2) ===
June 1
19:00 EDT (UTC−04:00)

Old Glory DC	47-29	Anthem RC

Maryland Soccerplex

June 1
20:00 EDT (UTC−04:00)

New Orleans Gold	7-21	Houston SaberCats

The Gold Mine

June 1
22:00 EDT (UTC−04:00)

Utah Warriors	20-27	San Diego Legion

Zions Bank Stadium

June 2
14:00 EDT (UTC−04:00)

New England Free Jacks	26-24	Dallas Jackals
	Report

Veterans Memorial Stadium
Attendance: 4,821

June 2
18:00 EDT (UTC−04:00)

RFC Los Angeles	45-15	Miami Sharks

Dignity Health Sports Park

=== Week 15 (June 8–9) ===
June 8
19:00 EDT (UTC−04:00)

Old Glory DC	30-31	New England Free Jacks
	Report

Maryland Soccerplex
Referee: Robin Kaluzniak (Canada)

June 8
20:00 EDT (UTC−04:00)

Houston SaberCats	29-12	RFC Los Angeles
	Report

SaberCats Stadium
Referee: Luke Rogan (USA)

June 9
16:00 EDT (UTC−04:00)

San Diego Legion	34-24	Anthem RC
	Report

Snapdragon Stadium
Referee: Chris Assmus (Canada)

June 9
18:00 EDT (UTC−04:00)

Miami Sharks	13-20	New Orleans Gold
	Report

AutoNation Field
Referee: Scott Green (USA)

June 9
20:00 EDT (UTC−04:00)

Dallas Jackals	22-20	Chicago Hounds
	Report

Choctaw Stadium
Referee: Federico Anselmi (Argentina)

June 9
22:00 EDT (UTC−04:00)

Seattle Seawolves	68-29	Utah Warriors
	Report

Starfire Sports Complex
Referee: Saba Abulashvili (Georgia)

=== Week 16 (June 14–16) ===
June 14
20:30 EDT (UTC−04:00)

Dallas Jackals	34-36	Old Glory DC

Choctaw Stadium

June 15
19:00 EDT (UTC−04:00)

Chicago Hounds	22-16	San Diego Legion

SeatGeek Stadium

June 15
20:00 EDT (UTC−04:00)

Houston SaberCats	28-25	Seattle Seawolves

SaberCats Stadium

June 16
15:00 EDT (UTC−04:00)

New England Free Jacks	36-27	Utah Warriors

Veterans Memorial Stadium

June 16
15:00 EDT (UTC−04:00)

Anthem RC	14-30	Miami Sharks

American Legion Memorial Stadium

June 16
18:00 EDT (UTC−04:00)

RFC Los Angeles	21-38	New Orleans Gold

Dignity Health Sports Park

=== Week 17 (June 22–23) ===
June 22
18:00 EDT (UTC−04:00)

New Orleans Gold	27–17	New England Free Jacks

The Gold Mine

June 22
19:00 EDT (UTC−04:00)

Anthem RC	29–38	Chicago Hounds

American Legion Memorial Stadium

June 22
19:30 EDT (UTC−04:00)

Miami Sharks	17–12	Old Glory DC

AutoNation Field

June 22
22:00 EDT (UTC−04:00)

Utah Warriors	50–46	Dallas Jackals

Zions Bank Stadium

June 22
22:00 EDT (UTC−04:00)

Seattle Seawolves	29–12	RFC Los Angeles

Starfire Sports Complex

June 23
18:00 EDT (UTC−04:00)

San Diego Legion	37–24	Houston SaberCats

Snapdragon Stadium
Attendance: 5,000

=== Week 18 (June 28–29) ===
June 28
22:30 EDT (UTC−04:00)

Utah Warriors	24–31	RFC Los Angeles
	Report

America First Field
Attendance: 10,906

June 29
17:00 EDT (UTC−04:00)

New England Free Jacks	40–7	Anthem RC

Veterans Memorial Stadium

June 29
19:00 EDT (UTC−04:00)

Old Glory DC	27–24	New Orleans Gold

Maryland Soccerplex

June 29
19:00 EDT (UTC−04:00)

Chicago Hounds	38–26	Miami Sharks

SeatGeek Stadium

June 29
20:00 EDT (UTC−04:00)

Houston SaberCats	29–28	Dallas Jackals
	Report

SaberCats Stadium
Referee: Luke Rogan (USA)

June 29
22:00 EDT (UTC−04:00)

San Diego Legion	45–33	Seattle Seawolves
	Report

Snapdragon Stadium
Referee: Angus Mabey (New Zealand)
