= Wian Conradie =

Namibian rugby union player

- Born: 14 October 1994 (age 32) Windhoek, Namibia
- Height: 1.85 m (6 ft 1 in)
- Weight: 105 kg (16 st 7 lb; 231 lb)

Rugby union career
- Position: Flanker
Amateur team(s)
Years	Team	Apps	(Points)
2015–2019	UJ	15	(12)
Senior career
Years	Team	Apps	(Points)
2019	Welwitschias	1	(0)
2019–2020	Doncaster Knights	12	(0)
2021	Dallas Jackals	2	
2021–2022	Gloucester		
2021–	New England Free Jacks	63	(100)
- Correct as of 7 July 2016
International career
Years	Team	Apps	(Points)
2013−2014	Namibia U20	8	(20)
2015–	Namibia	17	(25)
- Correct as of 14 September 2019

Wian Conradie (born 14 October 1994) is a Namibian rugby union player who plays for the New England Free Jacks of Major League Rugby (MLR). Conradie previously played for Gloucester in the Premiership Rugby He was first named to Namibia's squad for the 2015 Rugby World Cup, as well as the 2019 and 2023 World Cup

== College career ==
From 2015 to 2019, Conradie attended University of Johannesburg, where he played on the schools rugby team. During his tenure he won the top student athlete awards all four years which is given to a student for both academic and sporting excellence. During his senior year he also won the FNB UJ rugby clubman of the year award, along with an award for his dedicated service to FNB UJ rugby.

== Pro career ==
After graduating Conradie would join the Namibian club Welwitschias playing one game for the club. He then joined the Doncaster Knights with whom he made 12 appearances for from 2019 to 2020. In June 2020, it was announced that he had signed with the Dallas Jackals of Major league Rugby.

On March 9, 2021, it was announced the New England Free Jacks had signed Conradie for the 2021 season. He appeared in all 18 games that year for the Free Jacks scoring four tries. At the end of the season he was named to the All-MLR first team. On 15 July 2021, Conradie went to England to play for Gloucester in the Premiership Rugby in the 2021-22 season.

In March 2022, Conradie returned to the Free Jacks. He appeared in nine game for the club scoring two tries as the Free Jacks reached the conference finals. Conradie returned to the Free Jacks once again for the 2023 season, where he showed his ability to rush through the gainline while also maintaining his role as a defensive stalwart. In 16 matches he had 216 carries, running for 1560 meters, and scoring seven tries, while making 234 tackles. As a result, he was named the Major League Rugby Forward of the year and was named to the All-MLR first team for a second time, as the Free Jacks won the MLR championship.

During the 2024 season he would appear in eight games before being sustaining a season ending knee injury. Conradie would make a full return the following year appearing in 16 games scoring five tries, helping the Free Jacks win their third straight MLR championship in 2025. He would also reach his 50th cap with the free jacks on March 15, 2025, vs Nola Gold. At the end of the year Conradie would be named to the all MLR first team for the third time in his career.

== International career ==
Conradie attended Windhoek High School where he would play for one of the best schools in Namibia. Conradie went on to represent Namibia in 2012, u18 Craven Week in South Africa along with the U19 Confederation of African Rugby tournament. In 2013, Conradie his nation qualify for the Junior World Cup in South Africa then going on to represent the U20 squad at the World Rugby Trophy in Chile.

Conradie made his international debut for Namibia during the 2015 World Cup. Since then he has continued to make appearances for the team. Including their appearances in the 2019 and 2023 World Cup. Conradie scored his first international hat trick in Namibia's 36–0 win over Kenya during 2023 World Cup qualifiers.

== Personal life ==
Growing up in Namibia Conradie was a multi sport athlete. Besides rugby he would participate in Track and Field and would even represent Namibia in field hockey at different youth levels. He would attend the University of Johannesburg earning a bachelor's degree in B-tech Quantity Surveying he would also play for the schools rugby team.

Conradie is married to his wife Amouré and they have a son together named Duan.

== Honours ==
New England Free Jacks

- Major League Rugby Championship: 3x (2023, 2024, 2025)
- Major League Rugby Forward of the year: (2023)
- All Major League Rugby first team: 3x (2021, 2023, 2025)
