= Kyle Ciquera =

US rugby union player

- Born: June 14th 1996 United States
- Height: 183 cm (6 ft 0 in)
- Weight: 118 kg (260 lb; 18 st 8 lb)
- School: Bishop Hendricken
- University: St. Bonaventure University

Rugby union career
- Position: Prop
Amateur team(s)
Years	Team	Apps	(Points)
2018–	Mystic River Rugby Club		
Senior career
Years	Team	Apps	(Points)
2019–	Free Jacks	65	(12)
- Correct as of June 8th 2025

Kyle Ciquera is an American rugby union player. He plays at Prop for the New England Free Jacks in Major League Rugby (MLR).

== Career ==
=== Amateur career ===
A native of Connecticut, Ciquera started playing Rugby during his first year at Bishop Hendricken High School. In 2014 he won the Massachusetts rugby championship and was named to the Massachusetts Select Team. He would then play at the colligente level attending St. Bonaventure. Where he would be named to the D1A All-Conference Rugby East first team 3 times. As well as being named All American 3 times during his tenure. He would also play for Mystic River Rugby Club.

=== Pro career ===
Ciquera would join the New England free jacks in 2019, a product of the free jacks academy pathway. He would be a part of the teams inaugural season during the 2020 MLR season resigning during the 2020 off season. Over the next couple of seasons he would end up becoming a fan favorite among free jacks fans. During the 2023 season he would help the team win their first ever MLR championship. In 2024 he would make his 50th cap for the club on April 20 vs Seattle. Being the second player in team history to achieve the honor. However he would suffer a ACL tear before the start of the playoffs. He would make a full recovery from a his ACL tear and return during the end of the 2025 season. Scoring the game winning trie during the Eastern conference championship as the Free jacks would then go on to win the 2025 MLR championship.

== Personal life ==
Ciquera played Ice Hockey growing up before eventually switching over to rugby. He has also been given the nickname the Eagle throughout his playing career.

After winning the 2023 MLR championship Ciquera would get to thrown out the first pitch at a Boston Red Sox's game in September 2023.

In 2024 Ciquera and teammate Andrew Quattrin would shave their iconic mullets for charity.

== Honours ==
New England Free Jacks

- Major League Rugby Championship: 3x (2023, 2024, 2025)
