= Ben LeSage =

Canadian rugby union player (born 1995)

- Full name: Benjamin Boselli LeSage
- Born: 24 November 1995 (age 30) Calgary, Alberta
- Height: 6 ft 0 in (1.83 m)
- Weight: 98 kg (216 lb; 15 st 6 lb)
- University: University of British Columbia

Rugby union career
- Position: Centre
Youth career
- –2016: Calgary Canucks
Amateur team(s)
Years	Team	Apps	(Points)
2016–19	UBC Thunderbirds		
2019	Calgary Canucks		
Senior career
Years	Team	Apps	(Points)
2020–21	Toronto Arrows	18	(25)
2022	LA Giltinis		
2023–	New England Free Jacks	43	(32)
- Correct as of 18 March 2023
Provincial / State sides
Years	Team	Apps	(Points)
2017–	Prairie Wolf Pack		
International career
Years	Team	Apps	(Points)
2016–	Canada	19	(0)
- Correct as of 5 February 2022

Benjamin LeSage (born 24 November 1995) is a Canadian rugby union player who plays as a centre for the New England Free Jacks in Major League Rugby (MLR) and for Canada internationally. He previously played for the Toronto Arrows and the LA Giltinis

He is the son of Margaret and Bernard LeSage and an older brother to Natalie LeSage. He was included in the Canadian squad for the 2019 Rugby World Cup which is held in Japan for the first time and also marks his first World Cup appearance.

== Early life and education ==
LeSage hails from Calgary, Alberta. He attended Dr. E.P. Scarlett High School but ended up playing rugby for the Henry Wise Wood Warriors, winning Athlete of the Year upon graduation. After graduating, LeSage enrolled at the University of British Columbia where, alongside playing varsity rugby with the UBC Thunderbirds, he completed a Bachelor of Applied Science in Mechatronics, Robotics, and Automation Engineering. He is a member of the Sigma Chi fraternity.

== Career ==
He would spend 3 year playing at the amateur level in Canada from 2016-2019.

He made his international debut for Canada against Romania on 19 November 2016. He made his first World Cup match appearance against Italy on 26 September 2019 in Canada's opening match of the tournament in Pool B. The match ended up in a losing cause for Canada, where Italy thrashed them in a one sided contest by scoring 48–7.

Ben join the MLR in 2020 playing in 18 games for the Toronto arrows scoring 5 tries.

Ben would sign with New England free jacks in 2023. In his first year with the club he would appear in 15 matches helping lead the free jacks to their first MLR championship. As well as being named to the all MLR first team at the end of the season. The following year in 2024 he would appear in 19 matches scoring 22 points, and winning another league title. He would also win the 2024 S. Marcus Calloway Community Impact Award winner.

== Club statistics ==
As of 9 February 2022

Season	Team	Games	Starts	Sub	Tries	Cons	Pens	Drops	Points	Yel	Red
MLR 2020	Toronto Arrows	5	5	0	0	0	0	0	0	0	0
MLR 2021	Toronto Arrows	13	13	0	5	0	0	0	25	0	0
MLR 2022	LA Giltinis	1	1	0	0	0	0	0	0	0	0
Total		19	11	0	5	0	0	0	25	0	0

== Honours ==
New England Free Jacks

- Major League Rugby Championship: 3x (2023, 2024, 2025)
- S. Marcus Calloway Community Impact Award: 2024
- All MLR first team (2023)
