= Josh Larsen (rugby union) =

Canada international rugby union player

- Born: Joshua Larsen; 4 April 1994 (age 32) Nanaimo, British Columbia
- Height: 1.96 m (6 ft 5 in)
- Weight: 113 kg (249 lb)
- University: Otago University

Rugby union career
- Position(s): Flanker, Lock
- Current team: New England Free Jacks
Amateur team(s)
Years	Team	Apps	(Points)
- Taieri RFC
Senior career
Years	Team	Apps	(Points)
2019	Austin Elite	13	(10)
2020-2025	New England Free Jacks	65	(20)
- Correct as of 1 March 2020
Provincial / State sides
Years	Team	Apps	(Points)
2016-18	Northland	12	(5)
2018	Otago	5	(0)
International career
Years	Team	Apps	(Points)
2014	Canada U20	4	(0)
2017-	Canada	15	(5)
- Correct as of 19 June 2019

Joshua Larsen (born 4 April 1994) is a Canadian rugby union player who played for the New England Free Jacks in Major League Rugby (MLR). He became an assistant coach from the team in 2025. His usual position is lock. He also represents Canada internationally.

== Playing career ==
While studying at Otago University getting a bachelor's degree in commerce. Larsen played at the amateur level for Taieri RFC. Then joining the Northland academy and eventually playing professionally for Northland from 2016 to 2018. He then finished out the 2018 season with Otago in New Zealand's the Mitre 10 Cup. In October 2018, it was announced he signed with Austin Elite in Major League Rugby. During the 2019 season making 13 appearances and scoring 2 tries.

He would then sign with the New England Free Jacks in 2020. Being a cornerstone of the team since its inception. Severing as the team's captain since his first year. During the shorted 2020 season he would appear in five matches scoring two tries. During the 2021 season he appeared and started 12 games scoring one tries, in October it was announced he had signed a two year contract extension with the Free Jacks. During the 2022 season he appeared in 17 games starting 15 of them. After appearing in three games during the 2023 season Larsen would dislocate his shoulder missing the rest of the season.

Larsen would make a full come back the following year. Helping lead the Free Jacks to back to back MLR championships in 2024 and 2025 appearing in 14 games both seasons scoring one trie. Larsen got his 50th cap with the Free Jacks on July 27, 2024.

=== International career ===
Larsen previously play for Canadas U20 squad. Then getting to make his debut for the national team in November 2017 vs Georgia.

Larsen would make the 2019 World Cup squad and make headlines after getting red carded in a match vs South Africa for driving his shoulder into Thomas du Toit. Larsen would then show his sportsmanship after the match. When he went into the Springboks locker room after the game and apologized.

=== Coaching career ===
On November 12, 2025, it was announced Larsen would remain with the New England Free Jacks however he would transition from a player role to an assistant coach.

In August 2026, it was announced Larsen was the new forwards coach for UCLA rugby.

== Personal life ==
Larsen was born in Nanaimo to a New Zealand-born father and Canadian mother. He is the brother of Travis Larsen who also plays rugby.

Since moving to the United States Larsen has become a fan of American sports such as football. He has also described himself as a coffee connoisseur.

Larsen threw out the ceremonial first pitch at a Boston Red Sox game on August 31, 2025.

== Club statistics ==
As of 15 November 2025

Season	Team	League	Games	Starts	Sub	Tries	Cons	Pens	Drops	Points	Yel	Red
2019	Austin Elite	MLR	13	13	0	2	0	0	0	10	0	0
2020	New England Free Jacks	MLR	5	5	0	2	0	0	0	10	1	0
2021	New England Free Jacks	MLR	12	12	0	1	0	0	0	5	1	0
2022	New England Free Jacks	MLR	17	15	2	0	0	0	0	0	2	0
2023	New England Free Jacks	MLR	3	3	0	0	0	0	0	0	0	0
2024	New England Free Jacks	MLR	14	9	5	1	0	0	0	5	1	0
2025	New England Free Jacks	MLR	14	1	13	0	0	0	0	0	0	0
Total			78	58	2	6	0	0	0	30	5	0

Source.

== Honours ==
New England Free Jacks

- Major League Rugby Championship: 3x (2023, 2024, 2025)

Otago

- Ranfurly Shield: 2018
