= Miami Sharks =

Miami Sharks may refer to:

- Miami Freedom, defunct soccer team originally known as the Miami Sharks
- Miami Sharks (rugby union), rugby union team
