= Paula Balekana =

Fijian rugby union player (born 1993)

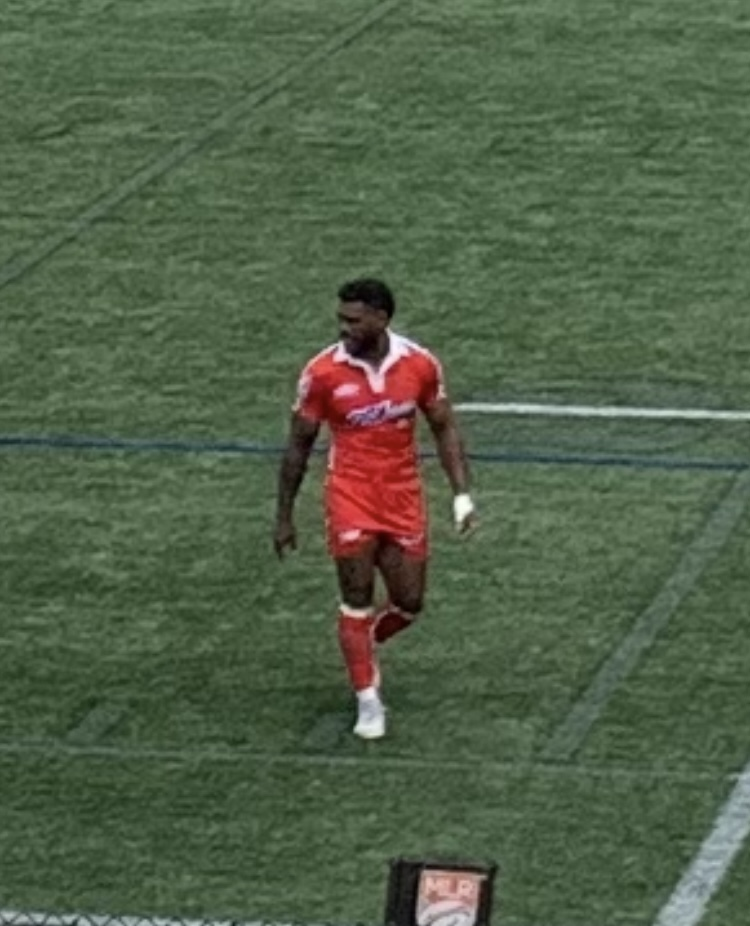
- Balekana with the Free Jacks in 2023
- Born: 18 May 1993 (age 33) Suva, Fiji
- Height: 1.83 m (6 ft 0 in)
- Weight: 90 kg (14 st 2 lb; 198 lb)
- School: Kelston Boys' High School

Rugby union career
- Position: Wing
- Current team: New England Free Jacks
Senior career
Years	Team	Apps	(Points)
2016−2017	Gordon	29	(120)
2017	Sydney Rays	3	(15)
2018–2020	Zebre	25	(20)
2021	Houston SaberCats	16	(30)
2022−	New England Free Jacks	58	(202)
2023	Hawke's Bay	7	(0)
2025	NorthLand	8	(0)
- Correct as of 1 August 2024

Paula Balekana (born 18 May 1993) is a Fijian rugby union player who currently plays as a wing for the New England Free Jacks in Major League Rugby (MLR). He previously played for the Houston SaberCats in MLR.

During his time in with the Free Jacks Balekana helped lead the team to a three-peat from 2023 to 2025, led the MLR in tries scored in both 2023 and 2025 and was named Major League Rugby player of the year in 2025.

He has also competed in the National Rugby Championship with the Sydney Rays, Zebre in the United Rugby Championship and the National Provincial Championship with multiple teams.

== Playing career ==
Balekana was named in the Sydney Rays squad for the 2017 National Rugby Championship season after having played for Gordon RFC in the Shute Shield. He made 29 appearances for the club, scoring 120 points. Afterwards, he played for Zebre during the 2018-19 Pro14 and 2019-20 Pro14 seasons.

In 2021 he was named to the MLR all second team, after scoring 6 tries in 16 matches.

After playing one year for Houston, he signed with the New England Free Jacks, scoring 6 tries in 12 matches during the 2022 season. The following year, during the 2023 season, Balekana led the MLR in tries, with 15, scoring 75 total points. He helped lead the Free Jacks to their first MLR championship.

He finished out the 2023 season playing for Hawke's Bay in New Zealand's domestic National Provincial Championship competition.

Balekana rejoined the Free Jacks in 2024 and helped the team win another title, scoring 4 tries in 15 appearances (all starts). In the 2025 season, he had a tremendous campaign, thriving on both sides of the ball starting all 15 games he appeared in. During a game vs. the Miami Sharks on April 6, he scored a career high three tries. He had 70 tackles and led the MLR in tries for a second time, with 15, including 2 in the MLR championship game, helping the Free Jacks win a third straight MLR title in the process. He also claimed his 50th cap for the club on April 5 vs Houston. At the end of the season, Balekana was named the 2025 Major League Rugby player of the year, and was selected to the all MLR first team.

Free Jacks' general manager Tom Kindley summed up Balekana's season by stating, "This season, his impact was immense—he consistently came up with game-changing moments on both sides of the ball, drawing on his experience and dogged drive to succeed." Balekana finished out the 2025 season with Northland in the National Provincial Championship.

In May 2026, Balekana rejoined the Free Jacks in the middle of the season however he only appeared in the final game of the season.

== Club statistics ==
As of 6 August 2026

Season	Team	League	Games	Starts	Sub	Tries	Cons	Pens	Drops	Points	Yel	Red
2018-2019	Zebre	MLR	18	14	4	3	0	0	0	15	0	0
2019-20	New England Free Jacks	MLR	9	8	1	1	0	0	0	5	1	0
2021	Houston Sabercats	MLR	16	16	0	6	0	0	0	30	0	0
2022	New England Free Jacks	MLR	12	12	0	6	0	0	0	32	1	0
2023	New England Free Jacks	MLR	17	16	1	15	0	0	0	75	0	0
2023	Hawke's Bay	NPC	7	4	3	0	0	0	0	0	0	0
2024	New England Free Jacks	MLR	15	15	0	4	0	0	0	15	0	0
2025	New England Free Jacks	MLR	14	14	0	15	0	0	0	75	1	0
2025	Northland	NPC	8	3	5	0	0	0	0	0	0	0
2026	New England Free Jacks	MLR	1	1	0	0	0	0	0	0	0	0
Total			117	103	14	50	0	0	0	247	3	0

== Honours ==
New England Free Jacks

- Major League Rugby Championship: 3x (2023, 2024, 2025)
- Major League Rugby player of the year: 2025
- All Major League Rugby first team (2025)

Houston SaberCats

- All Major League Rugby second team: (2021)

== Personal life ==
Balekana overcame adversity in his childhood: one of his brothers died unexpectedly when he was young, and his father became too sick to work. This would lead to his sister having to work at a young age. Balekana found rugby as an escape, playing frequently and dreaming of becoming a pro. This hard work led to him getting a scholarship offer to play at Kelston Boys' High School, and ultimately led to him becoming a pro.

Balekana is married to his wife, Setaita. The couple have two children together.
