= Malakai Hala-Ngatai =

New Zealand rugby union player (born 2003)

- Born: 7 January 2003 (age 23) New Zealand
- Height: 184 cm (6 ft 0 in)
- Weight: 125 kg (276 lb; 19 st 10 lb)
- School: Manukura

Rugby union career
- Position: Prop
- Current team: Manawatu
Senior career
Years	Team	Apps	(Points)
2023–	Manawatu	18	(5)
2024–2025	New England Free Jacks	30	(17)
2026	Moana Pasifika		
- Correct as of 9 November 2025
International career
Years	Team	Apps	(Points)
2023	New Zealand U20	4	(0)
- Correct as of 9 November 2025

Malakai Hala-Ngatai (born 7 January 2003) is a New Zealand rugby union player, who plays for Manawatu. His preferred position is prop.

== Early career ==
Hala-Ngatai was born in New Zealand but is of Tongan and Māori ancestry. He attended Manukura school where he played rugby and earned selection for the New Zealand Māori under-18 Ngā Whatukura team. He then earned selection for the Hurricanes U20 side in 2022, before earning selection for the New Zealand U20 side in 2023. He plays his club rugby for Kia Toa.

== Professional career ==
Hala-Ngatai has represented Manawatu in the National Provincial Championship since 2023, being named in the squad for the 2025 Bunnings NPC. In 2024, he joined the New England Free Jacks for the 2024 Major League Rugby season, helping them to win their second consecutive title, before returning for 2025 as they won their third consecutive title. He then signed for Moana Pasifika ahead of the 2026 Super Rugby Pacific season.
