= Dan Hollinshead =

New Zealand rugby union player

- Full name: Daniel Colin Hollinshead
- Born: 7 June 1995 (age 31) Tauranga, New Zealand
- Height: 186 cm (6 ft 1 in)
- Weight: 93 kg (205 lb; 14 st 9 lb)
- School: Tauranga Boys' College

Rugby union career
- Position: First five-eighth
- Current team: New England Free Jacks
Senior career
Years	Team	Apps	(Points)
2014–2020	Bay of Plenty	43	(253)
2017	Agen	13	(27)
2018	Coca-Cola Red Sparks	6	(19)
2019	Highlanders	2	(4)
2021	Rugby United New York	11	(107)
2021–2023	Rugby Club Vannes	16	(31)
2023	Rugby Southland	8	(33)
2024	RFC Los Angeles	9	(52)
2025	New England Free Jacks	8	(62)
2025	Rugby Southland		
- Correct as of 30 July 2025

Daniel Colin Hollinshead (born 7 June 1995 in New Zealand) is a New Zealand rugby union player who currently plays for New England Free Jacks of Major League Rugby (MLR). His playing position is fly-half.

He previously played for the Highlanders in Super Rugby. He was named in the Highlanders squad for week 13 in 2019.

After playing with four different clubs between 2021 and 2024, Hollinshead joined the New England Free Jacks, appearing in 8 games after their number 10 Jayson Potroz got injured. He scored coring 62 points including 13 in the 2025 MLR championship game helping the Free Jacks win 28–22 over Houston. Following the MLR title he rejoined Southland for the 2025 NPC season.
