= Andrew Quattrin =

Canadian rugby union player

- Full name: Andrew Joseph Quattrin
- Born: 29 August 1996 (age 30)
- Height: 6 ft 0 in (183 cm)
- Weight: 253 lb (115 kg; 18 st 1 lb)
- University: Laurier University

Rugby union career
- Position: Hooker
Amateur team(s)
Years	Team	Apps	(Points)
- Aurora Barbarians
Senior career
Years	Team	Apps	(Points)
2019–22	Toronto Arrows	48	(20)
2023-	New England Free Jacks	48	(92)
2023	Manawatu	5	(5)
2025	Valence Romans		
- Correct as of 10 July 2023
Provincial / State sides
Years	Team	Apps	(Points)
2016−18	Ontario Blues		
International career
Years	Team	Apps	(Points)
2016	Canada U20	1	(0)
2019–	Canada	16	(20)
- Correct as of 10 July 2023

Andrew Quattrin (born 29 August 1996) is a Canadian rugby union player. Quattrin plays Hooker for the New England Free Jacks in Major League Rugby (MLR) and plays for Valence Romans. He also represents Canada by playing for the Canadian rugby team. He was raised in Holland Landing, Ontario.

== Rugby career ==
=== Early career ===
Quattrin began playing rugby during his freshman year at Wilfrid Laurier University. While at Laurier, he was named a four-time Ontario University Association All-Star and Laurier’s only men’s rugby player to be named OUA MVP in 2017. He also earned the Fred Nichols Community Service award and was team captain.

=== International rugby ===
He previously represented Canada at age grade level playing for Canada U20 in 2016.

He made his debut for the Canadian national team on July 28, 2019 vs the USA in the Pacific Nations Cup. He also made 2 appearances in the 2019 World Cup.

=== Professional rugby union ===
Quattrin played for the Ontario Blues during the 2016 through the 2018 seasons.

On 11 December 2018, Quattrin signed a professional contract with the Toronto Arrows of Major League Rugby. Playing 3 seasons with the club from 2019-2022. Scoring 22 points.

During the 2022 MLR Championship Final, Quattrin was the recipient of the inaugural S. Marcus Calloway Community Impact Award. Quattrin was presented with a commemorative trophy and a $5,000 donation to his non-profit, Optimism Place.

He signed with the New England Free Jacks in 2023 and helped to lead them to back to back MLR championships in 2023, 2024. He was named to the All-MLR second team at the end of the 2024 season scoring 10 tries during the season. He appeared in 16 matches the following year in 2025 scoring 5 tries and winning a third straight MLR championship.

On August 26, 2025, Quattrin signed with the French club Valence Romans.

== Club statistics ==
As of 10 July 2023

Season	Team	Games	Starts	Sub	Tries	Cons	Pens	Drops	Points	Yel	Red
MLR 2019	Toronto Arrows	15	15	0	1	0	0	0	5	0	0
MLR 2020	Toronto Arrows	5	4	1	0	0	0	0	0	1	0
MLR 2021	Toronto Arrows	12	9	3	0	0	0	0	0	1	0
MLR 2022	Toronto Arrows	16	13	3	3	0	0	0	15	1	0
MLR 2023	New England Free Jacks	15	10	5	5	0	0	0	25	0	0
Total		63	51	12	9	0	0	0	45	3	0

== Honours ==
Toronto Arrows

- 1× S. Marcus Calloway Community Impact Award: 2022

New England Free Jacks

- 3× Major League Rugby Championship: 2023, 2024, 2025
- 1× All Major League Ruby Second team 2024.

== Personal life ==
Quattrin has made many charitable efforts such as initiating programs like the Operation Sock Drop (a sock collection for those in need) and food drop offs for Veterans in the Quincy, Massachusetts area, in collaboration with Roses Bounty food pantry in West Roxbury.

For seven years running, Quattrin has been helping run donation drives for Optimism Place, a Stratford, Ontario-based emergency shelter for women who are experiencing violence.

During his time with the Toronto Arrows he served as the team's community leader appearing at numerous community and charitable events in the city.
