= David Still =

American rugby union player

David Still (born August 23, 1998) is an American rugby union player who plays for the United States national rugby sevens team. He debuted for the USA 7s team at the 2021 Canada Sevens tournament. In rugby sevens, he generally plays as a forward given his size and strength, but also has the speed to play on the wing. He represented the U.S. at the 2022 Rugby World Cup Sevens.

During college, Still played American football as a linebacker at Saginaw State Valley University. After college, Still was recruited by, and in early 2021 joined, the Colorado XO rugby program, where he developed his rugby acumen. In June 2021, Still then signed with professional rugby team Austin Gilgronis of Major League Rugby.

On 2 February 2024, Still was named in the Anthem Rugby Carolina squad for the 2024 Major League Rugby season.
