= Manawatu (National Provincial Championship) =

NZ rugby union club, based in Palmerston North

- Official MRU emblem
- Union: Manawatū Rugby Union
- Nickname: Turbos
- Founded: 1886; 140 years ago
- Location: Takaro, Palmerston North, New Zealand
- Ground: Central Energy Trust Arena (Capacity: 18,000)
- CEO: Doug Tietjens
- Coach: Wesley Clarke
- Captain: TK Howden
- Most appearances: Gary Knight (145)
- Top scorer: Jason Holland (641)
- Most tries: Kenneth Granger (57)
- League: National Provincial Championship
- 2025: 11th
Team kit

Official website
- www.manawaturugby.co.nz

Manawatu (often known as the Manawatu Turbos) are a New Zealand professional rugby union team based in Palmerston North, New Zealand. The union was originally established in 1886, with the National Provincial Championship established in 1976. They now play in the reformed National Provincial Championship competition. They play their home games at Central Energy Trust Arena in Palmerston North in the Manawatū-Whanganui region. The team is affiliated with the Hurricanes Super Rugby franchise. Their home playing colours are green and white.

== Current squad ==
The Manawatū Turbos squad for the 2026 Hilux NPC season is:

2026 Manawatū squad
**Props**: (New Zealand) Joseph Gavigan; (New Zealand) Malakai Hala-Ngatai; (New Zealand) Darius Mafileo ^{WTG}; (New Zealand) Liam Pratt; (New Zealand) Feleti Sae-Taʻufoʻou; (Japan) Daigo Sasagawa; (New Zealand) Logan Wallace; (New Zealand) Flyn Yates; **Hookers**: (New Zealand) Vernon Bason; (Fiji) **Mesu Dolokoto** ^{ST} (Note: Dolokoto wasn’t named in the original Manawatū squad, but was announced in the side for Round 5.); (New Zealand) Alani Fakava; (New Zealand) Chris Finau ^{WTG}; (New Zealand) Nick Grogan ^{WTG}; (New Zealand) Raymond Tuputupu; **Locks**: (New Zealand) Reuben Allen; (Scotland) **Rob Harley**; (New Zealand) Angus Prouting; (Australia) Taine Roiri; (New Zealand) Ofa Tauatevalu ^{WTG}	**Loose forwards**: (New Zealand) Mosese Bason; (New Zealand) Dylan Hall ^{WTG}; (New Zealand) TK Howden **(c)**; (New Zealand) Brayden Iose; (New Zealand) Samuel Johnson ^{WTG}; (New Zealand) Tyler Laubscher; (New Zealand) Reuben Nelley ^{WTG}; (New Zealand) Rory Woods; **Halfbacks (scrum-halves)**: (Australia) Doug Philipson; (New Zealand) Regan Sword ^{WTG}; (New Zealand) Jai Tamati (injured); (New Zealand) Jordi Viljoen; (New Zealand) Bryn Wilson ^{WTG}; **First five-eighths (fly-halves)**: (New Zealand) Tevita Asi ^{WTG}; (New Zealand) **Brett Cameron** (injured); (New Zealand) Reece MacDonald; (New Zealand) Liam O’Connor ^{WTG}; (England) George Worboys	**Midfielders (centres)**: (New Zealand) Kyle Brown; (Tonga) **Ngani Laumape**; (New Zealand) Taofuka Paongo (injured); (New Zealand) James Tofa; **Outside backs**: (England) Albert Bradshaw; (New Zealand) Sam Coles; (Tonga) **Taniela Filimone**; (New Zealand) Hunter Kennedy ^{WTG}; (Fiji) Pita Manamanaivalu ^{WTG}; (New Zealand) Tamatoa Ropati ^{WTG}; (Tonga) **John Tapueluelu** ^{WTG}; (New Zealand) Pena Va'a; (New Zealand) Drew Wild
**(c)** denotes the team captain. **Bold** denotes internationally capped players.^{ST} denotes a short-term signing.^{WTG} denotes a wider training group member. denotes an injured player. Source:

== Honours ==
Manawatu have been overall Champions on one occasion, winning the title in 1980. Their full list of honours include:

National Provincial Championship First Division

- Winners: 1980

ITM Cup Championship Division

- Winners: 2014

== Current Super Rugby players ==
Players named in the 2025 Manawatu Turbos squad, who also earned contracts or were named in a squad for any side participating in the 2025 Super Rugby Pacific season.

Player	Team
Isaiah Armstrong-Ravula	Drua
Brett Cameron	Hurricanes
Taniela Filimone	Highlanders
TK Howden	Highlanders
Brayden Iose	Hurricanes
Feleti Sae-Taʻufoʻou	Moana Pasifika
Ofa Tauatevalu	Moana Pasifika
Raymond Tuputupu	Hurricanes
Jordi Viljoen	Hurricanes
