= Cameron Nordli-Kelemeti =

Fijian rugby union player (born 1999)

- Born: Cameron Nordli-Kelemeti; 20 September 1999 (age 27) Vatu, Fiji
- Height: 1.77 m (5 ft 10 in)
- Weight: 84 kg (13 st 3 lb)
- School: Terrington Hall Prep School; Durham School

Rugby union career
- Position: Scrum half
- Current team: Doncaster Knights
Senior career
Years	Team	Apps	(Points)
2018–2024	Newcastle Falcons	33	(5)
2021	→ Jersey Reds (loan)	3	(0)
2024-2026	New England Free Jacks	29	(30)
2026–	Doncaster Knights		
- Correct as of 11 February 2026

Cameron Nordli-Kelemeti (born 20 September 1999) is a Fijian rugby union player. His primary position is scrum half.

He has previously played for Newcastle Falcons and Jersey Reds. He would sign for the New England Free Jacks in 2024, being part of two championship teams in 2024 and 2025.

== Early life ==
Nordli-Kelemeti was born in Fiji, he was raised by his grandmother after his mother died when he was six years-old. Initially educated at LDS Primary school in Suva, at 11 he moved to Terrington Hall Prep School in North Yorkshire, England, on a scholarship. He then attended Durham School and after playing for Newcastle Falcons' under 18s he signed a full time contract with Newcastle in February 2018.

== Career ==
In November 2018 he made his first team debut for Newcastle as a substitute in a Premiership Rugby Cup win away to Harlequins. In February 2021, he joined Jersey Reds on loan in the RFU Championship, playing three times. His league debut for Newcastle came in 2021, as a replacement again against Harlequins.

In October 2023, he was signed by New England Free Jacks. He made 14 appearances during the 2024 season. The following year he would be a bigger role in the lineup appearing in 15 games and scoring 25 points winning a second straight MLR championship.

On 4 December 2025, Nordli-Kelemeti returns to England to sign a short-term contract with Doncaster Knights in the Champ Rugby for the rest of the 2025–26 season.

== Honours ==
New England Free Jacks

- Major League Rugby Championship: 2x (2024, 2025)
