= Stan van den Hoven =

Dutch rugby union player

- Born: 22 November 1998 (age 27) Netherlands
- Height: 2.03 m (6 ft 8 in)
- Weight: 113 kg (17.8 st; 249 lb)

Rugby union career
- Position: Lock
Senior career
Years	Team	Apps	(Points)
2019–2021	Bay of Plenty	17	(0)
2022	New England Free Jacks	16	(0)
2022	Taranaki	1	(0)
2023–	Manawatu	7	(0)
2024–2025	Miami Sharks	14	(0)
- Correct as of 19 March 2022

Stan van den Hoven (born 22 November 1998) is a Dutch rugby union player who last played for the Miami Sharks of Major League Rugby (MLR). His preferred position is lock.

== Professional career ==
The Miami Sharks signed Van den Hoven in February 2024 for the 2024 Major League Rugby Season. Previously, Van den Hoven signed for Major League Rugby side New England Free Jacks for the 2022 Major League Rugby season. He has also previously played for Bay of Plenty, making his debut in the 2019 Mitre 10 Cup, and was named in the squad for the 2021 Bunnings NPC.
