= 2025 Major League Rugby final =

Championship rugby match

2025 Major League Rugby Championship Final
- Event: 2025 Major League Rugby season
| New England Free Jacks (Eastern Conference) | Houston SaberCats (Western Conference) |
| 28 | 22 |
- Match details
- Date: June 28, 2025
- Venue: Centreville Bank Stadium, Pawtucket, Rhode Island
- Man of the Match: Brock Webster (Free Jacks)
- Referee: Luke Rogan United States)
- Attendance: 5,702
- Weather: Cloudy day 60.8 °F (16.0 °C); 52% humidity

The 2025 Major League Rugby Championship Final was the seventh Major League Rugby (MLR) championship match, held at the conclusion of the eighth season of the rugby union club competition in North America. The match was played on June 28, 2025, at Centreville Bank Stadium in Pawtucket, Rhode Island. It was contested by the Houston SaberCats and New England Free Jacks.

== Background ==
=== Road to the final ===
2025 MLR Eastern Conference
| | Club | P | W | D | L | PF | PA | PD | TF | TA | TB | LB | Pts |
|---|---|---|---|---|---|---|---|---|---|---|---|---|---|
| 1 | * – New England Free Jacks | 16 | 11 | 0 | 5 | 425 | 341 | +84 | 61 | 47 | 9 | 2 | 55 |
| 2 | c – Chicago Hounds | 16 | 11 | 0 | 5 | 422 | 353 | +69 | 57 | 49 | 7 | 2 | 53 |
| 3 | x – Old Glory DC | 16 | 8 | 0 | 8 | 438 | 478 | -40 | 63 | 67 | 11 | 2 | 45 |
| 4 | x – Miami Sharks | 16 | 8 | 0 | 8 | 380 | 442 | -62 | 45 | 66 | 6 | 3 | 41 |
| 5 | e – New Orleans Gold | 16 | 4 | 0 | 12 | 428 | 473 | -45 | 60 | 71 | 8 | 8 | 32 |
| 6 | e – Anthem Rugby Carolina | 16 | 0 | 0 | 16 | 282 | 570 | -288 | 42 | 86 | 2 | 3 | 5 |

Notes

- * - League Champions
- z – Clinched home field advantage for the entire playoffs
- c – Clinched home field advantage for the conference semi-finals
- y – Clinched conference title
- x – Clinched playoff spot
- e – Eliminated from playoff contention

==== Eastern Conference Semi-Final (June 15) ====
June 15, 2025
13:00 EDT

| New England Free Jacks | 32–10 | Miami Sharks |
| Try: Balekana 1' m Quattrin 29' c Simon-Peter Toleafoa 48' c Malan 78' c Con: Hollinshead (2/3) 30', 49'; Oscar Lennon (1/1) 78'; Pen: Hollinshead (1/1) 61'; Drop: Hollinshead (1/1) 65'; Cards: von Dadelszen 56' yellow | Report | Try: Myhill 57' c Con: O'Leary (1/1) 58'; Pen: O'Leary (1/2) 9' |

Veterans Memorial Stadium
Referee: Robin Kaluzniak

==== Eastern Conference Finals (June 21) ====
June 21, 2025
13:00 EDT

| New England Free Jacks | 21–20 | Chicago Hounds |
| Try: Melvin 53' c Nordli-Kelemeti 58' c Ciquera 77' c Con: Hollinshead (2/2) 54', 59'; Auto Conversion 78' | Report | Try: Swiel 11' c Noah Brown 43' c Con: Hilsenbeck (2/2) 12', 44'; Pen: Hilsenbeck (2/4) 18', 61' |

Veterans Memorial Stadium
Referee: Federico Anselmi

2025 MLR Western Conference
| | Club | P | W | D | L | PF | PA | PD | TF | TA | TB | LB | Pts |
|---|---|---|---|---|---|---|---|---|---|---|---|---|---|
| 1 | z – Utah Warriors | 16 | 11 | 0 | 5 | 529 | 443 | +86 | 77 | 59 | 12 | 2 | 58 |
| 2 | y – Houston SaberCats | 16 | 10 | 0 | 6 | 458 | 365 | +93 | 63 | 53 | 10 | 4 | 54 |
| 3 | x – RFC Los Angeles | 16 | 8 | 1 | 7 | 501 | 497 | +4 | 76 | 71 | 14 | 3 | 51 |
| 4 | x – Seattle Seawolves | 16 | 8 | 1 | 7 | 460 | 422 | +38 | 67 | 56 | 11 | 4 | 49 |
| 5 | e – San Diego Legion | 16 | 8 | 0 | 8 | 490 | 429 | +61 | 74 | 60 | 12 | 4 | 48 |

Notes

- * - League Champions
- z – Clinched home field advantage for the entire playoffs
- c – Clinched home field advantage for the conference semi-finals
- y – Clinched conference title
- x – Clinched playoff spot
- e – Eliminated from playoff contention

==== Western Conference Semi-Final (June 16) ====
June 16, 2025
18:30 CDT

| Houston SaberCats | 27–21 | RFC Los Angeles |
| Try: McLean 10' m Pita Anae-Ah Sue 18' c, 48' c Max Schumacher 43' m Con: Alatimu (2/4) 19', 49'; Pen: Alatimu (1/1) 66'; Cards: Scott 71' yellow Redelinghuys 76' yellow | Report | Try: Anstee 24' c Reece MacDonald 38' c Ben Houston 76' c Con: Lealiifano (3/3) 25', 39', 77' |

SaberCats Stadium
Referee: Lex Weiner

==== Western Conference Finals (June 21) ====
June 21, 2025
19:00 MDT

| Utah Warriors | 19–33 | Houston SaberCats |
| Try: Lance Williams 17' m Lasike 75' c Tu Vugakoto 81' c Con: Hodgson (2/3) 76', 82' | Report | Try: Basson 3' c Alatimu 30' c Tasi 35' c Drake Davis 54' c Seth Smith 65' m Con: Alatimu (4/4) 4', 31', 36', 55'; Cards: Redelinghuys 80' yellow |

Zions Bank Stadium
Referee: Robin Kaluzniak

=== Venue selection ===
On March 14, 2024, MLR announced that Centreville Bank Stadium in Pawtucket, Rhode Island would host the Championship Final. It is the home stadium of Rhode Island FC of the USLC and the first league championship to be hosted in the northeast since 2022; and will be the first major championship sporting event to be held at Centreville Bank Stadium.

== Broadcasting ==
The Championship Final was broadcast in the United States on ESPN2.

== Match ==
June 28, 2025
14:00 EDT (UTC−04)

| New England Free Jacks | 28–22 | Houston SaberCats |
| Try: Balekana 13' c, 69' m Caird 45' c Con: Hollinshead (3/4) 14', 46', 58'; Pen: Hollinshead (2/2) 7', 18' | Report | Try: Schumacher 20' c, 78 m D. Davis 51' c Con: Alatimu (2/3) 21', 52'; Pen: Alatimu (1/2) 10' |

Centreville Bank Stadium, Pawtucket
Attendance: 5,702
Referee: Luke Rogan United States)
