= 2024 Major League Rugby season =

Seventh season of Major League Rugby

- Countries: United States (12 teams)
- Date: March 2 – August 4
- Champions: New England Free Jacks (2nd title)
- Runners-up: Seattle Seawolves
- Matches played: 103
- Highest attendance: 12,085; Seattle Seawolves 11–20 New England Free Jacks; August 4, 2024
- Top point scorer: (New Zealand) Jayson Potroz (181)
- Top try scorer: (New Zealand) Michael Manson (14)

Official website
- majorleague.rugby

The 2024 Major League Rugby season was the seventh season of Major League Rugby, the professional rugby union competition sanctioned by USA Rugby. The regular season began on March 2, 2024, and lasted through June 29, 2024, followed by the Championship Series.

The Miami Sharks and Anthem Rugby Carolina made their league debut this season, as well as Rugby Football Club Los Angeles following their move from Atlanta. The Toronto Arrows and Rugby New York withdrew from the league following the 2023 season. This left a total of 12 teams competing for the 2024 season.

== Teams and format ==
Following the departure of Toronto and New York, the arrival of Miami and Charlotte, and the relocation of Atlanta to Los Angeles, the League had 12 teams for the 2024 season. As a result, Chicago was moved to the Eastern conference, ensuring both conferences had 6 teams each.

Locations of teams in Major League Rugby
Western Conference Eastern Conference

#	Club	Metro area	Stadium	Capacity	Coach	Captain
WESTERN	Dallas Jackals	Dallas, Texas	Choctaw Stadium	48,114	(Argentina) Agustín Cavalieri	(Argentina) Jerónimo Gómez Vara
WESTERN	Houston SaberCats	Houston, Texas	SaberCats Stadium	4,000	(South Africa) Pote Human	(South Africa) Johan Momsen
WESTERN	Rugby Football Club Los Angeles	Carson, California	Dignity Health Sports Park	27,000	(New Zealand) Stephen Brett	(Ireland) Niall Saunders
WESTERN	San Diego Legion	San Diego, California	Snapdragon Stadium	35,000	(New Zealand) Danny Lee	(Scotland) Blair Cowan
WESTERN	Seattle Seawolves	Seattle, Washington	Starfire Stadium	4,500	(Ireland) Allen Clarke	(United States) Riekert Hattingh
WESTERN	Utah Warriors	Salt Lake City, Utah	Zions Bank Stadium	5,000	(New Zealand) Greg Cooper	(United States) Bailey Wilson
EASTERN	Anthem Rugby Carolina	Charlotte, North Carolina	American Legion Memorial Stadium	10,500	(New Zealand) Alama Ieremia	(United States) Jake Turnbull
EASTERN	Chicago Hounds	Chicago, Illinois	SeatGeek Stadium	20,000	(Australia) Sam Harris	(Australia) Bill Meakes
EASTERN	Miami Sharks	Fort Lauderdale, Florida	AutoNation Sports Field	1,500	(Argentina) José Pellicena	(Argentina) Tomás Cubelli
EASTERN	New England Free Jacks	Boston, Massachusetts	Veterans Memorial Stadium	5,000	(South Africa) Scott Mathie	(Canada) Josh Larsen
EASTERN	New Orleans Gold	New Orleans, Louisiana	Gold Mine	10,000	(New Zealand) Cory Brown	(United States) Moni Tongaʻuiha
EASTERN	Old Glory DC	Washington, D.C.	Maryland SoccerPlex	5,000	(Scotland) Simon Cross	(United States) Jamason Faʻanana-Schultz

== Regular season ==
The regular season consisted of 18 weeks, with each team playing 16 matches, beginning on March 2, 2024, and ending on June 29.

=== Standings ===
2024 MLR Eastern Conference
	Club	P	W	D	L	PF	PA	PD	TF	TA	TB	LB	Pts
1	New England Free Jacks	16	11	0	5	463	344	119	65	45	8	3	55
2	New Orleans Gold	16	10	0	6	410	349	61	58	47	8	2	50
3	Chicago Hounds	16	8	1	7	454	387	67	65	51	7	4	45
4	Old Glory DC	16	7	2	7	394	416	-22	50	57	6	4	42
5	Miami Sharks	16	6	0	10	335	389	-54	40	51	4	4	32
6	Anthem Rugby Carolina	16	0	0	16	323	676	-353	47	102	6	1	7
Tiebreakers If teams are level at any stage, tiebreaker criteria are as follows (coin tosses or draw of lots will be used if those below fail): 1. number of matches won 2. the difference between points for and points against 3. the number of tries scored 4. the most points scored 5. the difference between tries for and tries against 6. the fewest red cards received 7. the fewest yellow cards received

2024 MLR Western Conference
	Club	P	W	D	L	PF	PA	PD	TF	TA	TB	LB	Pts
1	Houston SaberCats	16	14	0	2	478	347	131	66	47	11	0	67
2	Seattle Seawolves	16	11	0	5	498	373	125	63	49	9	4	57
3	San Diego Legion	16	11	0	5	421	374	47	51	45	7	4	55
4	Dallas Jackals	16	6	0	10	482	450	32	71	62	10	9	43
5	Utah Warriors	16	5	0	11	424	471	-47	60	67	7	8	35
6	RFC Los Angeles	16	5	1	10	367	473	-106	54	67	8	2	32
Tiebreakers If teams are level at any stage, tiebreaker criteria are as follows (coin tosses or draw of lots will be used if those below fail): 1. number of matches won 2. the difference between points for and points against 3. the number of tries scored 4. the most points scored 5. the difference between tries for and tries against 6. the fewest red cards received 7. the fewest yellow cards received

=== Matches ===
The following are the match results for the 2024 Major League Rugby regular season:

Home \ Away	CAR	CHI	DAL	HOU	LA	MIA	NE	NO	DC	SD	SEA	UTA
Anthem Rugby Carolina		29–38	28–68	15–38	29–33	14–30	13–46	5–40	32–46			
Chicago Hounds	59–26				54–31	38–26	17-22	13–25	21–22	22–16	26–34	
Dallas Jackals		22–20		27–30	26–29			22-35	34–36	23–30	14–7	22–20
Houston SaberCats		23–22	29–28		29–12	30–19	35–47			33–0	28–25	22–15
Rugby Football Club Los Angeles			29–32	12–27		45–15	12–34	21–38		19–27	5–36	36-32
Miami Sharks	50-21	19–23	17–38				15–13	13–20	17–12	21–22		20–19
New England Free Jacks	40–7	20–26	26–24			25–3		27–21	34–35		21–29	36–27
New Orleans Gold	34–19	21–38		7–21		27–42	27–17		18–6		32–31	21–14
Old Glory DC	47–29	22–22		17–38	22–22	13–10	30–31	27–24		11-27		
San Diego Legion	34–24		30–24	37–24	19–18		23–24	33–20			45–33	32–33
Seattle Seawolves	29–13		34–32	40-42	29–12	29–18			26–24	25–19		68–29
Utah Warriors	44–19	29–15	50–46	24–29	24–31				31–24	20–27	13–23	

Updated to match(es) played on May 2, 2024
Colors: Blue: home team win; Yellow: draw; Red: away team win.

== Championship Series ==
=== Bracket ===
Conference Semi-Finals
1	Houston Sabercats	22
4	Dallas Jackals	34
2	Seattle Seawolves	30
3	San Diego Legion	28
1	New England Free Jacks	33
4	Old Glory DC	29
2	New Orleans Gold	21
3	Chicago Hounds	45

Conference Finals
2	Seattle Seawolves	28
4	Dallas Jackals	25
1	New England Free Jacks	23
3	Chicago Hounds	17

Final
2	Seattle Seawolves	11
1	New England Free Jacks	20

The play-off draw is seeded based on final positions in the regular season conference tables.

The higher-ranked teams in the Conference Semi-finals and Conference Finals have home field advantage.

=== Conference Semi-Finals (July 20–21) ===
July 20, 2024
17:00 EDT (UTC−04:00)

New England Free Jacks	33−29	Old Glory DC
Try: MacDonald 3'; Melvin 35'; Lennon 40'; Con: Potroz 4' 36' 40+1'; Pen: Potroz 10' 15' 38' 59'	Report

Veterans Memorial Stadium
Referee: Lex Weiner (USA)

July 20, 2024
19:30 EDT (UTC−04:00)

Houston SaberCats	22−34	Dallas Jackals
	Report

SaberCats Stadium
Referee: Federico Anselmi (Argentina)

July 21, 2024
18:30 EDT (UTC−04:00)

New Orleans Gold	21−45	Chicago Hounds
	Report

Gold Mine
Referee: Scott Green (USA)

July 21, 2024
21:00 EDT (UTC−04:00)

Seattle Seawolves	30−28	San Diego Legion
	Report

Starfire Sports
Referee: Luke Rogan (USA)

=== Conference Finals (July 27–28) ===
July 27, 2024
13:00 EDT (UTC−04:00)

New England Free Jacks	23–17	Chicago Hounds
Try: R. MacDonald (2) 20' m, 23' m A. Quattrin 71' c Con: J. Potroz (1/3) 72'; Pen: J. Potroz (2/2) 45', 58'; Cards: C. Keys (yellow card) 54' to 64'	Report	Try: N. Augspurger 40' c D. Fawsitt 65' c Con: L. Carty (2/2) 40’+1', 66′ Pen: L. Carty (1/2) 54'

Veterans Memorial Stadium
Referee: Federico Anselmi (Argentina)

July 28, 2024
16:00 EDT (UTC−04:00)

Seattle Seawolves	28–25	Dallas Jackals
Try: Penalty try 22'; J. Taufete’e 36' c J. Smith 50' c R. Rees 78' c Con: M. Mason (1/1) 51'; S. Windsor (1/1) 79'; Pen: M. Mason (0/1); Cards: M. Ngakuru (yellow card) 30' to 40'	Report	Try: N. Benn (2) 12' c, 31' c T. Bekerman 73' m Con: J. Oliver (2/2) 13', 32'; Pen: J. Oliver (2/3) 3', 29'; Cards: J. Zeiss (yellow card) 21' to 31'; M. Alikhan (yellow card) 22' to 32'

Starfire Sports
Referee: Scott Green (USA)

=== Championship final (August 4) ===
August 4, 2024
1:00 pm PDT

Seattle Seawolves	11–20	New England Free Jacks
Try: J. Taufete’e 31' m Con: M. Mason (0/1); Pen: M. Mason (2/3) 25', 48'; Cards: T. Lopeti (yellow card) 52' to 62'	Report	Try: L. Malan 14'; Con: J. Potroz (0/1); Pen: J. Potroz (5/5) 9', 28', 40’+1', 45', 52'

Snapdragon Stadium
Attendance: 12,085
Referee: Luke Rogan (USA)

== Player statistics ==
=== Top scorers ===
The top five try and point scorers during the 2024 Major League Rugby season are:

Last updated: September 13, 2024

Most tries
No	Player	Team	Tries
1	(New Zealand) Michael Manson	Utah Warriors	14
1	(United States) Dylan Fawsitt	Chicago Hounds	14
3	(Tonga) Taniela Filimone	New Orleans Gold	11
3	(Canada) Dewald Kotze	Dallas Jackals	11
5	(Fiji) Semi Kunatani	RFCLA	10

Most points
No	Player	Team	Pts
1	(New Zealand) Jayson Potroz	New England Free Jacks	181
2	(Australia) Mack Mason	Seattle Seawolves	172
3	(New Zealand) Jason Robertson	Old Glory DC	138
4	(England) Joel Hodgson	Utah Warriors	111
5	(Samoa) AJ Alatimu	Houston Sabercats	85

MLR awards the try scorer 7 points when there is an Automatic Conversion (The ball is touched down between the post in the in-goal area).

== End of Season Awards ==
Award	Player	Team	Position	Ref.
Coach of the Year	Scott Mathie	New England Free Jacks	Head coach	
Player of the Year	Wayne van der Bank	New England Free Jacks	Center	
Rookie of the Year	Junior Gafa	Anthem Rugby Carolina	Center	
Back of the Year	Reece MacDonald	New England Free Jacks	Fly-half	
Forward of the Year	Jero Gomez Vara	Dallas Jackals	Flanker	
S. Marcus Calloway Community Impact	Ben LeSage	New England Free Jacks	Center	

== Attendances ==
#	Club	Average attendance
1	Seattle Seawolves	4,213
2	New England Free Jacks	3,756
3	San Diego Legion	3,482
4	Houston SaberCats	3,167
5	Old Glory DC	2,874
6	Utah Warriors	2,521
7	NOLA Gold	2,342
8	RFCLA	2,104
9	Chicago Hounds	1,967
10	Dallas Jackals	1,842
11	Miami Sharks	1,453
12	Anthem Rugby Carolina	1,350
