= Michael Manson (rugby union) =

New Zealand rugby union player

- Born: 5 July 2001 (age 25) Invercargill, New Zealand
- Height: 181 cm (5 ft 11 in)
- Weight: 87 kg (192 lb; 13 st 10 lb)
- School: Otago Boys' High School

Rugby union career
- Position: Wing
- Current team: Highlanders, Southland
Senior career
Years	Team	Apps	(Points)
2021	Otago	2	(0)
2022–	Southland	28	(60)
2024	Utah Warriors	12	(70)
2025–	Highlanders	3	(0)
- Correct as of 4 August 2025

Michael Manson (born 5 July 2001) is a New Zealand rugby union player, who plays for the Highlanders and Southland. His preferred position is wing.

== Early career ==
Manson is from Invercargill and attended Otago Boys' High School. He represented NZ Schools and the Highlanders U20s side.

== Professional career ==
Manson has represented Southland in the National Provincial Championship since 2022, being named in their full squad for the 2024 Bunnings NPC. He had previously represented Otago in 2021 and also had a spell at Utah Warriors for the 2024 Major League Rugby season. He was named in the Highlanders squad for the 2025 Super Rugby Pacific season in November 2024.
