= Reece MacDonald =

New Zealand rugby union player

- Born: 10 December 1997 (age 28) Durban, South Africa
- Height: 175 cm (5 ft 9 in)
- Weight: 83 kg (183 lb; 13 st 1 lb)
- Notable relative: Piet Visagie Grandfather Springbok 1967 - 1971

Rugby union career
- Position(s): First five-eighth, Fullback
- Current team: NEC Green Rockets
Senior career
Years	Team	Apps	(Points)
2019	Bay of Plenty	1	(2)
2019-2022	Gordon RFC	40	(234)
2022-2024	Free Jacks	30	(86)
2024, 2026-	Manawatu	6	(29)
2025	RFC Los Angeles	7	(35)
2025–	NEC Green Rockets	12	(22)
- Correct as of 11 July 2025

Reece Macdonald (born 10 December 1997) is a New Zealand rugby union player. He plays for RFC Los Angeles of the (MLR). As well as Green Rockets Tokatsu.

== Career ==
Macdonald comes from Mount Maunganui New Zealand. He played at the amateur level for the club Te Puna. He was signed by Bay of Plenty in 2018.

Macdonald moved to Sydney, where he became a key player for Gordon in the Shute Shield from 2019 to 2022, winning the Shute Shield in 2020 and being the competition’s top scorer in his last year with the club in 2022.

Macdonald later moved to the United States signing with the New England free jacks of the MLR. In his first year with the club he appeared in 14 matches scoring 29 points. Helping the team win the 2023 MLR championship. He rejoined the club for the 2024 season appearing in 16 matches and scoring 7 tries winning another MLR championship. At the end of the season Macdonald was named the MLR back of the year. Also being named to the all MLR first team.

He returned to New Zealand finishing out the year with Manawatu appearing in 6 games scoring 29 points.

Macdonald signed with RFC Los Angeles playing for them during the 2025 season.

On August 1st 2025 it was announced Macdonald would sign with the Green Rockets Tokatsu of Japan Rugby League One.

== Honours ==
New England Free Jacks

- MLR championship: 2x (2023, 2024)
- Major league rugby back of the year: (2024)
- All Major league rugby first team: (2024)

Gordon RFC

- Premiership Title Shute Shield: (2020)
- Club Championship: (2020)
