= Piers von Dadelszen =

Canada international rugby union player

- Born: March 25, 2000 (age 26) Toronto, ON, Canada
- Height: 6 ft 4 in (193 cm)
- Weight: 243 lb (110 kg)
- School: St. George's School (Vancouver) Whitgift School
- University: Oxford University

Rugby union career
- Position(s): Lock, Flanker
Senior career
Years	Team	Apps	(Points)
2024-2026	New England Free Jacks	33	(10)
2026-	Tokyo Gas Rugby Club	5	(10)
International career
Years	Team	Apps	(Points)
2022–	Canada	15	(5)

Piers von Dadelszen (born March 25, 2000) is a Canadian professional rugby union player and entrepreneur.

== Rugby career ==
Born in Toronto, Ontario, and brought up in Vancouver, British Columbia, von Dadelszen began his rugby career at Meraloma Rugby Club and St. George's School (Vancouver), Vancouver, and was a Canadian provincial and national under-age representative. He was educated initially at St. George's School (Vancouver) and, in England, at Whitgift School. He continued his studies at the University of Oxford and gained three Blues while playing for Oxford University RFC, as a back-rower and lock.

=== Professional ===
After completing his master's degree in engineering, von Dadelszen was signed by Major League Rugby team, the New England Free Jacks, for the 2024 season. He would make 33 appearances for the club between 2024 and 2025, scoring 2 tries, and winning both the 2024 and 2025 MLR championship.

=== International ===
In 2022, von Dadelszen was capped for Canada in matches against Spain and Namibia. He made a further two appearances in 2023, against Tonga in Nukuʻalofa.

In 2025, he started in the tests against Belgium (Man of the Match), Spain, the USA, Japan, Fiji, Tonga, Romania (1 try), Georgia, and Portugal. The victory against the USA resulted in Canada national rugby union team qualifying for the 2027 Men's Rugby World Cup.

== Honours ==
New England Free Jacks

- Major League Rugby Championship: 2x (2024, 2025)
- Rookie of the Year (2024)

Canada Senior Men’s 15

- Man of the Match: Canada vs Belgium (12 July 2025)

OURFC

- Major Stanley XV (2025)

== See also ==
- List of Canada national rugby union players
