= Jayson Potroz =

New Zealand rugby union player

- Born: 26 November 1991 (age 34) Strantford New Zealand
- Height: 183 cm (6 ft 0 in)
- Weight: 90 kg (198 lb; 14 st 2 lb)
- University: Francis Douglas Memorial College

Rugby union career
- Position(s): First five-eighth, fullback
- Current team: Taranaki, Free Jacks
Senior career
| Years | Team | Apps | (Points) |
| 2018– | Taranaki | 53 | (177) |
| 2023– | Free Jacks | 37 | (353) |
- Correct as of 11 July 2025

Jayson Potroz (born 26 November 1991) is a New Zealand rugby union player. He plays at fullback in the National Provincial Championship for Taranaki. He also played for the New England Free Jacks in Major League Rugby (MLR).

After playing college rugby and spending years in the developmental level Potroz debuted for Taranaki in 2018, where he helped the club gain promotion to the National Provincial Championship primer division and win the championship in 2023.

In 2023 he signed with the New England Free Jacks of the MLR where he became a key player in helping them complete a three-peat from 2023-2025. Potroz also led the MLR in points in both 2023 and 2024 and was the 2023 Major League Rugby Player of the Year.

== Career ==
Potroz has played premier club rugby in Taranaki since he left Francis Douglas Memorial College in 2009, first playing for Stratford until 2013, and now playing for Tukapa. He has played age group, development, and representative sevens, and featured in Taranaki pre-season matches for a number of years. However, he made his first-class debut in 2018 against Poverty Bay in a Ranfurly Shield pre-season match in Tikorangi, then against Wanganui in the second Ranfurly Shield pre-season match and came off the bench against Canterbury. He was best known in his first season for scoring a 55m intercept try in his third match of 2018. He scored three tries that year.

In 2019, Potroz started in all 10 matches for Taranaki, scoring a total of 17 points. He played nine matches at fullback and one on the wing. At the end of the season, he was named Back of the Year, the first non-Super Rugby player to win such an award. He also won Sevens Player of the Year. The following year, during the 2020 season, Potroz appeared in 11 matches, scoring 3 tries, 16 conversions and penalties for 95 total points.

In the Taranaki premier competition, Potroz has played over 100 matches for Tukapa and predominantly plays first-five eighth. In the 2017 club competition, he was the leading try scorer and highest points scorer.

During the 2021 season Potroz appeared in nine matches starting every game and scoring one trie as he and Taranaki won the NPC championship division defeating Otago to gain promotion to the premier division.

In September 2022, it was announced that Potroz would play for the New England Free Jacks in Major League Rugby competition in 2023. He was a key play maker for the team, starting 16 matches and having a superb kicking, running and passing game, and leading the MLR in scoring during the 2023 season with 146 points with 47 conversions, 15 penalties and one trie. This led to him being named MLR player of the year. In the postseason, he and the Free Jacks won the MLR championship defeating San Diego Legion. Portroz scored two penalty kicks and two conversions during the championship game, this led to him being named the championship match MVP.

He then returned to New Zealand to play for his province in the 2023 National Provincial Championship. Appearing in 11 matches starting 6 and scoring 26 points, (2 penalties 3 conversion and one trie) as he and Taranaki won the NPC championship vs Hawke's Bay, 22-19.

He returned to the Free Jacks for the 2024 season, where he started 17 matches and led the league in points for a second consecutive year with 181 (6 tries, 23 penalties and 41 conversions). He scored five penalties in the championship game as the Free Jacks beat Seattle 20-11. Potroz was named to the all MLR first team in both 2023 and 2024.

He returned to Taranaki after the 2024 MLR season, and claimed his 50th cap for the club on 31 August 2024. He appeared in six matches for the club that season scoring one conversion.

During the 2025 MLR season Potroz faced a couple of different injuries, and only appeared in four games, scoring 26 points. He eventually suffered a season-ending knee injury during match week 16 vs Seattle. He finished the year in a player-coach role winning a third MLR championship. In late 2025, it was confirmed Potroz had left the Free Jacks.

== Honours ==
New England Free Jacks

- Major League Rugby Championship: 3x (2023, 2024, 2025)
- Major league Rugby player of the year: (2023)
- Major League Rugby Championship game MVP: (2023)
- All Major League Rugby first team: 2x (2023, 2024)

Taranaki

- Bunnings National Provincial Championship (2023)
- Bunnings NPC championship division: (2021)
- Ranfurly Shield: (2020)
- NPC Back of the Year (2019)
- Sevens Player of the Year (2019)

== Personal life ==
Potroz has a girlfriend named Nicola Milby. The two have a daughter together named Mila.

Potroz also enjoys fishing and playing golf.

He once stated that after sustaining some injuries early in his career, he started to go down a different path and got a building apprenticeship. Around age 24 he decided to give sport one more shot, which eventually led to his professional career.
