= Shane O'Leary =

Canada international rugby union player

- Born: Shane Patrick O'Leary; 12 March 1993 (age 33) Cork, Ireland
- Height: 1.78 m (5 ft 10 in)
- Weight: 90 kg (14 st 2 lb)
- School: Killaloe Community College

Rugby union career
- Position(s): Centre, Fly-half
- Current team: Rouen; Toronto Arrows
Amateur team(s)
Years	Team	Apps	(Points)
- Scarriff
–	Young Munster		
Senior career
Years	Team	Apps	(Points)
2013–2014	Grenoble	5	(0)
2014–2017	Connacht	24	(44)
2017–2018	Ealing Trailfinders	9	(26)
2018–2020	Nottingham	35	(287)
2020–2022	Rouen	27	(52)
2023	Toronto Arrows	11	(52)
2024–2025	Miami Sharks	17	(108)
- Correct as of 16 June 2025
Provincial / State sides
Years	Team	Apps	(Points)
2017	Atlantic Rock	1	(0)
International career
Years	Team	Apps	(Points)
2013	Canada U20	4	(47)
2017–	Canada	13	(43)
- Correct as of 9 September 2019

Shane Patrick O'Leary (born 12 March 1993) is an Irish-born professional rugby union player who represents Canada at the international level. He primarily plays at fly-half, but has also played as a centre. O'Leary played for Major League Rugby side the Miami Sharks and for the Toronto Arrows in Major League Rugby (MLR).

He previously played for Nottingham, Ealing Trailfinders, Irish provincial side Connacht, MLR side Toronto Arrows, Rouen and Grenoble in France.

O'Leary qualifies as Canadian through his mother and first represented Canada when he played for their under-20 team at the 2013 Junior World Trophy. He began playing for the senior team in 2017 after being called up for trials ahead of the mid-year internationals.

== Early life ==
Born in Cork, O'Leary grew up in Ballina, County Tipperary. He received his secondary education at the community college in Killaloe. In his youth he played for the Scariff rugby team and made the Munster under-18 clubs side while a member there and later moved to Young Munster. While at Young Munster, O'Leary was part of the Munster Rugby under-age set up. Shane's father Declan is coaching services manager with Coaching Ireland, working with a wide variety of sports.

== Club career ==
=== Grenoble ===
Ahead of the 2013–14 season O'Leary moved to French side Grenoble in the Top 14, joining the team's academy. O'Leary had previously worked with Grenoble skills coach Mike Prendergast, who gave him his debut at Young Munster. Like O'Leary, Predergast was in his first season at the French club. O'Leary had also been assisted by Rugby Canada in his move to France, as the union had helped him to distribute information on himself and his availability to clubs around Europe in an attempt to break into professional rugby. Prendergast and O'Leary made up part a significant Irish contingent for the team, along with scrum-half James Hart, forwards coach Bernard Jackman and the captain Andrew Farley, an Australian-born former Ireland A player.

O'Leary impressed in the academy and was handed a debut for the senior side in the 2013–14 European Challenge Cup, coming on as a replacement against Bayonne on 10 October 2013. O'Leary made four further appearances, playing in the home and away games with London Wasps and Viadana. He was a replacement in all but one of these appearances, starting away to Wasps.

=== Connacht ===
It was announced in May 2014 that O'Leary would be returning to Ireland for the 2014–15 season. He signed for the provincial side Connacht, joining on a one-year deal. In his first season with the team O'Leary made four appearances in the Pro12, scoring two tries. He didn't feature in the 2014–15 Challenge Cup but featured in the team's play-off to qualify for the following season's Champions Cup. All of O'Leary's appearances for the senior team in his first year came from the bench. In August 2015, he agreed another one-year deal with Connacht.

In his second season, O'Leary played in three of Connacht's Challenge Cup games. He was used as a replacement against Newcastle Falcons in Galway, before starting the away fixture. O'Leary also started in the side's quarter-final meeting with his former club Grenoble. O'Leary continued to be used sparingly throughout the 2015–16 Pro12 campaign, but injuries to Jack Carty, AJ MacGinty and Craig Ronaldson led to him making more appearances later in the season. He made two starts and three substitute appearances in total during the course of the regular season as Connacht qualified for the league's play-offs. O'Leary was an unused substitute in the semi-final against Glasgow Warriors, but came on in the Grand Final against Leinster to help close out the game as Connacht claimed their first ever league title. He signed another contract extension in June 2016 to take him up to summer of 2017 with the province.

In the 2016–17 season, O'Leary appeared as a substitute in Connacht's opening five Pro12 games, and in the opening two rounds of the Champions Cup. He didn't in the Pro12 clash with Leinster, but returned for the following round against Newport Gwent Dragons. That month however, O'Leary suffered a concussion injury in training. This injury ruled O'Leary out for some time and he failed to make an appearance for the first team for the remainder of the season. In April 2017, it was announced that O'Leary would depart Connacht at the end of the season.

=== Atlantic Rock ===
In May 2017, O'Leary traveled to Canada to take part in trials for the national team. While there, he joined Canadian Rugby Championship side Atlantic Rock. O'Leary played in a single game for the St. John's-based side.

=== Ealing Trailfinders ===
In September 2017, it was announced that O'Leary had signed for Ealing Trailfinders in the English Championship. Signing for Ealing also meant linking up with Canadian international teammate Djustice Sears-Duru.

=== Nottingham ===
On 29 March 2018, O'Leary will leave Ealing Trailfinders to sign for English Championship rivals Nottingham ahead of the 2018-19 season.

=== Rouen ===
On 18 April 2020, O'Leary signs for French side Rouen in the Pro D2 ahead of the 2020–21 season.

=== Toronto Arrows ===
In October 2022 he signed with the Toronto Arrows for the 2023 MLR season.

== International career ==
Qualified to play for Canada through his mother who was born in New Brunswick, O'Leary contacted Mike Shelley of Rugby Canada to inform the union of his eligibility after he was overlooked for the Ireland under-20 team. O'Leary was chosen in the Canadian under-20 squad for the 2013 IRB Junior World Rugby Trophy. The faith in him was rewarded when he scored 45 points, finishing as the tournament's top scorer as Canada made it to the final, where they were beaten by the Italian under-20s.

In 2017 after departing Connacht, O'Leary was called up to trials for the Canadian senior team ahead of the team's June internationals. He was named to make his debut with a start at out-half in the team's opening game of the series against Georgia on 10 June 2017.
