= Camuzzi Gas =

Argentine natural gas distribution company

- Company type: Sociedad Anónima
- Traded as: BCBA: CGPA2
- Industry: Utilities
- Founded: 1992; 34 years ago
- Headquarters: Buenos Aires City, Argentina
- Key people: Alejandro Macfarlane, Chairman
- Products: Gas distribution
- Revenue: ▼30.30 billion ARS (2019)
- Net income: ▼ -4.28 billion ARS (2019)
- Subsidiaries: Camuzzi Gas del Sur; Camuzzi Gas Pampeana
- Website: www.camuzzigas.com

Camuzzi Gas is an Argentine natural gas distribution company that through its subsidiaries operates in the southernmost provinces of Argentina apart from Buenos Aires province, Camuzzi Gas Pampeana (in a part of the Buenos Aires Province and all La Pampa Province) and Camuzzi Gas del Sur un the following provinces Neuquén, Chubut, Río Negro, Santa Cruz and Tierra del Fuego; covers 45% of the country's concession areas, serving 2 (Note: Pampeana has 1.35 million customers and del Sur 650,000.) million customers.
