= Bailey Wilson =

US international rugby union player

- Born: 28 December 1999 (age 26) Sydney, Australia
- Height: 193 cm (6 ft 4 in)
- Weight: 98 kg (216 lb; 15 st 6 lb)

Rugby union career
- Position: Flanker / Number 8
- Current team: Utah Warriors
Senior career
Years	Team	Apps	(Points)
2020–	Utah Warriors	53	(30)
- Correct as of 17 March 2024
International career
Years	Team	Apps	(Points)
2022–	USA Falcons XV		
2023–	United States	1	(0)
- Correct as of 17 March 2024

Bailey Wilson (born 28 December 1999) is an American rugby union player, currently playing for the Utah Warriors in Major League Rugby (MLR). His preferred position is flanker or number 8.

== Early career ==
Wilson is from Sydney, Australia, however he moved to Utah aged 14, attending Lone Peak High School. He represented the USA U19 side.

== Professional career ==
Wilson first signed for the Utah Warriors ahead of the 2020 Major League Rugby season, and has represented the side since, being named captain for the 2023 and 2024 seasons.

Wilson has qualified to represent America on residency. He made his debut for the United States in 2023, against Spain.
