= Taniela Filimone =

Tongan rugby union player

- Born: 1 June 1999 (age 27) Lofanga, Tonga
- Height: 186 cm (6 ft 1 in)
- Weight: 99 kg (218 lb; 15 st 8 lb)
- School: Rotorua Boys' High School

Rugby union career
- Position: Centre / Wing / Fullback
- Current team: Highlanders, Manawatu
Senior career
Years	Team	Apps	(Points)
2021–	Manawatu	30	(65)
2023	New England Free Jacks	9	(15)
2024	New Orleans Gold	17	(55)
2025	Highlanders	5	(10)
- Correct as of 4 October 2025
International career
Years	Team	Apps	(Points)
2019	Tonga U20		
2024–	Tonga	4	(5)
- Correct as of 12 April 2025

Taniela Filimone (born 1 June 1999) is a Tongan rugby union player, who plays for Highlanders and Manawatu. His preferred position is centre, wing or fullback.

== Early career ==
Filimone was born in Tonga and originally attended Tupou College Toloa before attending Rotorua Boys' High School on a scholarship. He originally played his club rugby for Tauranga. In 2019 he represented Tonga U20.

== Professional career ==
Filimone has represented Manawatu in the National Provincial Championship since 2021, being named as a replacement player for the 2024 Bunnings NPC. In 2023, having previously spent time with the Chiefs in Super Rugby, he moved to America to play for the New England Free Jacks. In 2024 he transferred to the New Orleans Gold, scoring 11 tries across the 2024 Major League Rugby season. He was called into the Highlanders squad ahead of Round 9 of the 2025 Super Rugby Pacific season, making his debut against the Drua scoring two tries.

In July 2024, Filimone made his international debut for Tonga, representing them against Italy.
