= Niall Saunders =

Irish rugby union player

- Born: 21 December 1997 (age 28) Chertsey, England
- Height: 1.75 m (5 ft 9 in)
- Weight: 88 kg (13.9 st; 194 lb)

Rugby union career
- Position: Scrum-half
Senior career
Years	Team	Apps	(Points)
2017–2020	Harlequins	16	(0)
2021	Tel Aviv Heat	3	(17)
2022–	Utah Warriors	5	(10)
- Correct as of 19 March 2022
International career
Years	Team	Apps	(Points)
2016	Ireland U20	4	(0)
- Correct as of 19 March 2022

Niall Saunders (born 21 December 1997) is an English rugby union player, currently playing for the Rugby ATL of Major League Rugby (MLR). His preferred position is scrum-half.

== Professional career ==
Saunders signed for Major League Rugby side Utah Warriors for the 2022 Major League Rugby season. He has also previously played for Harlequins and the Tel Aviv Heat. Saunders had previously retired from rugby, before returning with Utah in 2022.
