= 2023 Major League Rugby final =

US Championship rugby union match

2023 Major League Rugby Championship Final
- Event: 2023 Major League Rugby season
San Diego Legion (Western Conference)	New England Free Jacks (Eastern Conference)
24	25
- Match details
- Date: July 8, 2023
- Venue: SeatGeek Stadium, Bridgeview, Illinois
- Man of the Match: Jayson Potroz (Free Jacks)
- Referee: Joe James (England)
- Attendance: 10,103
- Weather: Partly cloudy day 86 °F (30 °C); 53% humidity

The 2023 Major League Rugby Championship Final was the fifth Major League Rugby (MLR) championship match, held at the conclusion of the 6th season of the rugby union club competition in North America. The match was played on July 8, 2023, at SeatGeek Stadium in Bridgeview, Illinois. It was the first MLR Final to be held in Illinois, and the first since the 2019 final to be held at a pre-determined venue. The match was won by the New England Free Jacks over the San Diego Legion by a score of 25-24, claiming their first MLR Championship.

== Background ==
MLR Eastern Conference
	P	W	D	L	PF	PA	PD	TF	TA	TB	LB	Pts
New England Free Jacks (C)	16	14	0	2	556	273	+283	80	36	11	1	68
Rugby New York	16	8	0	8	428	387	+41	62	52	10	1	43
Old Glory DC (SF)	16	7	1	8	408	443	-35	60	62	11	2	43
New Orleans Gold	16	7	0	9	339	435	-96	46	61	6	1	35
Rugby ATL	16	5	1	10	355	428	-73	48	59	5	1	28
Toronto Arrows	16	1	2	13	306	601	-295	37	88	4	4	16
Tiebreakers If teams are level at any stage, tiebreaker criteria are as follows (coin tosses or draw of lots will be used if those below fail): 1. number of matches won 2. the difference between points for and points against 3. the number of tries scored 4. the most points scored 5. the difference between tries for and tries against 6. the fewest red cards received 7. the fewest yellow cards received
Green background indicates teams in position for the Eastern Conference Finals; Blue background indicates teams in position for the Eastern Conference Semi-Finals; Last Updated: July 9, 2023

MLR Western Conference
	P	W	D	L	PF	PA	PD	TF	TA	TB	LB	Pts
San Diego Legion (RU)	16	15	0	1	554	285	+269	81	41	13	1	74
Seattle Seawolves (SF)	16	12	0	4	509	348	+161	67	48	9	2	59
Houston SaberCats	16	10	0	6	484	413	+71	70	57	11	2	53
Utah Warriors	16	10	0	6	445	421	+24	63	59	8	2	50
Chicago Hounds	16	3	0	13	327	497	-170	43	70	4	4	20
Dallas Jackals	16	2	0	14	278	458	-180	41	64	6	5	19
Tiebreakers If teams are level at any stage, tiebreaker criteria are as follows (coin tosses or draw of lots will be used if those below fail): 1. number of matches won 2. the difference between points for and points against 3. the number of tries scored 4. the most points scored 5. the difference between tries for and tries against 6. the fewest red cards received 7. the fewest yellow cards received
Green background indicates teams in position for the Western Conference Finals; Blue background indicates teams in position for the Western Conference Semi-Finals; Last Updated: June 18, 2023

On March 16, 2023, MLR announced that the Championship Final would be held at SeatGeek Stadium, the home ground of the Chicago Hounds. The format for qualifying for the Championship Series remained the same from 2022, with the top-ranked team of each conference receiving a bye to the Conference Final, as well as home advantage. Likewise, the second-ranked team would host the third-ranked team of their respective conference, in the Eliminators.

In the Western Conference, San Diego Legion qualified for the Championship Series following a victory over the defending Champions, Rugby New York. They were then able to secure the top ranking with a victory over the Toronto Arrows. The second-ranked team, the Seattle Seawolves, qualified following a victory over the Utah Warriors. The third-ranked team, Houston Sabercats, qualified following a victory over Old Glory DC.

In the Eastern Conference, New England Free Jacks qualified both for the Championship Series, and the top ranking, with a victory over the Toronto Arrows. The second-ranked team, Old Glory DC, qualified for the Championship series following their victory over New Orleans Gold. Finally, defending Champions, Rugby New York, qualified after their victory over Rugby ATL.

== Championship Series ==
=== Western Conference ===
In the Western Eliminator, the Seattle Seawolves defeated Houston Sabercats 37-26, at Starfire Sports Stadium. This marked Seattle's fourth and Houston's second Championship Series appearances, respectfully. The teams had previously faced each other in the Championship Series in 2022.

June 24	Seattle Seawolves	37–26	Houston SaberCats	Starfire Stadium
15:00 PDT	Try: Charles Elton 30'; Adriaan Carelse 40'; Riekert Hattingh 68'; Juan-Philip Smith 78'; Con: AJ Alatimu (3/3) 31', 69', 79'; Automatic conversion 40'; Pen: AJ Alatimu (3/3) 23', 42', 49'; Cards: Sam Matenga (yellow card) 25'	Report	Try: Dom Akina 27'; Davey Coetzer 51'; Gideon van Wyk 60'; Louritz van der Schyff 80+1'; Con: Davey Coetzer (3/3) 28', 52', 60'; Danny Barrett (0/1); Drop: Gerrie Labuschagné (0/1)	Referee: Joe James (RFU) Assistants: Luke Rogan (USAR) & Austin Reed (USAR) TMO: Nick Hannon (USAR) Man of the Match: Riekert Hattingh (Seattle Seawolves)

In the Conference Final, Seattle were hosted by San Diego Legion, at Snapdragon Stadium, where the Legion won 32-10. This marked the third time San Diego has reached the Championship Series, and the first time they played in the Conference Final. Seattle reached their second Conference Final in succession. This also marked San Diego and Seattle's fourth encounter in the post-season, having previously met in the 2018 semi-final, 2019 final, and 2022 eliminator.

July 2	San Diego Legion	32–10	Seattle Seawolves	Snapdragon Stadium
15:00 PDT	Try: Fakaʻosi Pifeleti 25'; Tomas Aoake (2) 57', 67'; Marcel Brache 62'; Con: Will Hooley (2/3) 26, 58'; Automatic conversion 62'; Pen: Will Hooley (1/1) 23'; Drop: Ma'a Nonu (1/1) 11'; Cards: Nathan Sylvia (yellow card) 65'	Report	Try: Ben Landry 65'; Con: Jordan Chait (1/1) 66'; Pen: Jordan Chait (1/1) 39'	Referee: Cam Stone (NZR) Assistants: Luke Rogan (USAR) & Kahlil Harrison (USAR) TMO: Chris Assmus (RC) Man of the Match: Ma'a Nonu (San Diego Legion)

=== Eastern Conference ===
The Eastern Eliminator featured Rugby New York hosting Old Glory DC, with Washington upset New York 37-33. This was New York's third consecutive appearance in the Championship Series, having reached the Conference Final in 2021, and winning the Championship Final in 2022. This also marked DC's first appearance in the post-season, since their inception in 2020.

June 25	Rugby New York	33–37	Old Glory DC	Mount Vernon Memorial Stadium
18:00 EDT	Try: Faʻasui Fuatai 1'; Penalty try 27'; Dylan Fawsitt (2) 33', 51'; DaQuan Perry 80'; Con: Sam Windsor (3/4) 34', 51', 80+1'; Cards: Sam Davies (yellow card) 66'; Tevita Langi (yellow card) 67'	Report	Try: William Talataina 4'; Kyle Baillie 57'; Penalty try 67'; Kurt Baker 78'; Con: Joaquín Díaz Bonilla (3/3) 5', 58', 79'; Pen: Joaquín Díaz Bonilla (3/3) 8', 21', 38'; Cards: Kyle Baillie (yellow card) 27'; Lautaro Bavaro (yellow card) 33'	Attendance: 1,300; Referee: Federico Anselmi (UAR) Assistants: Chris Assmus (RC) & Cisco Lopez (USAR) TMO: Derek Summers (USAR) Man of the Match: Joaquín Díaz Bonilla (Old Glory DC)

In the Conference Final, New England Free Jacks hosted Old Glory DC, at Veterans Memorial Stadium, winning the match 25-7. This was New England's second Eastern Conference final, having finished top of the Eastern ranking in both 2022 and 2023, and DC's first. The match also marked New England's and DC's first encounter in the Championship Series.

July 1	New England Free Jacks	25–7	Old Glory DC	Veterans Memorial Stadium
17:30 EDT	Try: Le Roux Malan 4'; Andrew Quattrin 12'; Taniela Filimone 64'; Con: Automatic conversion 4'; Jayson Potroz (1/2) 65'; Pen: Jayson Potroz (2/2) 18', 40+3'	Report	Try: Thretton Palamo 72'; Con: Joaquín Díaz Bonilla (1/1) 73'	Attendance: 3,414; Referee: Joe James (RFU) Assistants: Federico Anselmi (UAR) & Peter Pender (RC) TMO: Chris Assmus (RC) Man of the Match: Mitch Jacobson (New England Free Jacks)

== Venue ==
On March 16, 2023, MLR announced that the Championship Final would be held at SeatGeek Stadium, the home ground of the Chicago Hounds. Part of the festivities includes a pre-match DJ set by Shaquille O'Neal (as DJ Diesel,) and a post-match concert by Dropkick Murphys.

== Broadcasting ==
The match was broadcast in the United States on Fox, averaging 269,000 viewers. It was available internationally on The Rugby Network.

== Match ==
The San Diego Legion were declared the "home" side, after accumulating more table points in the regular season.

July 8, 2023
14:00 CDT (UTC−05)

San Diego Legion	24–25	New England Free Jacks
Try: Poidevin 9' c Augspurger (2) 29' c, 60' c Con: Hooley (3/3) 10', 30', 61'; Pen: Hooley (1/1) 40'+2	Report	Try: Jacobson 4' c Balekana 45' c Malan 76' m Con: Potroz (2/3) 5', 46'; Pen: Potroz (2/2) 14', 18'

SeatGeek Stadium, Bridgeview
Attendance: 10,103
Referee: Joe James (England)
