= Jake Turnbull =

US international rugby union player

- Full name: Jake Turnbull
- Born: 17 July 1993 (age 33) Sydney
- Height: 188 cm (6 ft 2 in)
- Weight: 117 kg (258 lb; 18 st 6 lb)
- School: Waverley College

Rugby union career
- Position: Loosehead Prop
- Current team: Anthem RC
Senior career
| Years | Team | Apps | (Points) |
| 2012–2015 | Eastern Suburbs RUFC | ≥2 | (≥0) |
| 2015 | Glendale Raptors | | |
| 2016 | New York Athletic Club RFC | | |
| 2016 | Denver Stampede | 12 | (0) |
| 2017 | Eastern Suburbs RUFC | 9 | (0) |
| 2018–2019 | Houston Sabercats | 20 | (5) |
| 2020 | Old Glory DC | 5 | (0) |
| 2020 | Randwick DRUFC | 14 | (0) |
| 2021–2022 | Austin Gilgronis | 26 | (25) |
| 2022 | Eastern Suburbs RUFC | 6 | (10) |
| 2023 | Seattle Seawolves | 18 | (15) |
| 2024– | Anthem RC | 1 | (0) |
| 2012– | Total | ≥113 | (≥55) |
- Correct as of 8 March 2024
International career
| Years | Team | Apps | (Points) |
| 2016 | USA Selects | 2 | (5) |
| 2023– | USA | 5 | (0) |
| 2023 | USA XV | 1 | (0) |
- Correct as of 8 March 2024

Jake Turnbull (born 17 July 1993), is an Australian-born American international rugby union player who currently captains Anthem Rugby Carolina in the MLR.

== Club career ==
Born and raised in Sydney, Turnbull began playing rugby at his school, Waverley College, before joining Eastern Suburbs RUFC in 2012 playing in the NSW Shute Shield.

In 2015 he moved to the US to play for the Glendale Raptors in the Pacific Rugby Premiership, with Glendale winning the title that year with a 25–11 win over San Francisco Golden Gate RFC.

In 2016 he played for New York Athletic Club RFC in the American Rugby Premiership, before joining Denver Stampede for the inaugural PRO Rugby season, Turnbull played in all 12 of the Stampedes matches in the season with the Colorado-based side winning the competition. With the collapse of PRO Rugby Turnbull returned to Australia playing for Eastern Suburbs RUFC again.

In 2018 he joined Houston SaberCats ahead of the inaugural Major League Rugby season. He featured in 20 out of 24 possible matches for the SaberCats over his two seasons at the club. While at the SaberCats he worked as a youth development coach in their player pathway program. He joined Old Glory DC for the 2020 MLR season, however only featured 5 times with 3 starts due to the cancellation of the season due to the coronavirus pandemic. He returned to Australia and played for Randwick DRUFC.

He joined Austin Gilgronis in 2021 playing with them for two seasons. On the May 28 2022 in a win over San Diego Legion, Turbull became the 18th player to reach 50 MLR caps, he also scored two tries in the 44–28 victory. On June 7 due to breaches of the salary cap rules, Major League Rugby, the Austin Gilgronis from the playoffs. Turnbull once again returned to Australia to play for Eastern Suburbs RUFC.

In 2023 he joined Seattle Seawolves through the MLR dispersion draft. He played in all of Seattle's games in the 2023 MLR season. He joined the newly formed Anthem Rugby Carolina in 2024 captaining them in their first ever game, a 46–13 loss against the New England Free Jacks.

== International career ==
He qualifies for the US through his mother. He featured twice for the USA Selects side in 2016. Captaining the side against the Argentina XV and Uruguay XV in Montevideo. He made his full USA debut in a test match against Romania in 2023, coming off the bench in a 17–31 win. He played in a uncapped match for the USA against Toulouse, starting in the 24–21 win. He earned his first start in the final of the La Vila International Rugby Cup, beating Spain 12–42.
