= Mack Mason =

Australian rugby union player

- Born: Mack Mason; 19 January 1996 (age 30) Cairns, Queensland
- Height: 1.78 m (5 ft 10 in)
- Weight: 84 kg (13.2 st; 185 lb)
- School: Anglican Church Grammar School

Rugby union career
- Position: Fly-Half
- Current team: Seattle Seawolves
2016-2018	Eastern Suburbs	37	(280))
Senior career
Years	Team	Apps	(Points)
2015–2016	Queensland Country	8	(34)
2017	Greater Sydney Rams	7	(54)
2018–2019	NSW Country Eagles	10	(27)
2021–2022	Austin Gilgronis	27	(183)
2024-	Seattle Seawolves	18	(172)
Super Rugby
Years	Team	Apps	(Points)
2017-2019	Waratahs	6	(14)
International career
Years	Team	Apps	(Points)
- Australia U20

Mack Mason (born 19 January 1996) is an Australian rugby union player who plays as a fly-half for the Seattle Seawolves in the Major League Rugby (MLR).

He previously played for the New South Wales Waratahs in Super Rugby.

Mason made his Super Rugby debut on Sunday, 2 April against the Crusaders.
