= Joel Hodgson (rugby union) =

- Born: Joel James Hodgson; 1 August 1992 (age 34) Newcastle upon Tyne, England
- Height: 1.78 m (5 ft 10 in)
- Weight: 80 kg (12 st 8 lb; 176 lb)
- School: Royal Grammar School Newcastle

Rugby union career
- Position: Fly-half / Scrum-half
Senior career
Years	Team	Apps	(Points)
2010–14	Newcastle Falcons	37	(107)
2013–14	→Rotherham Titans	3	(15)
2014–15	Northampton Saints	5	(0)
2015–16	Yorkshire Carnegie	24	(79)
2016–22	Newcastle Falcons	68	(266)
2022	Glasgow Warriors	0	(0)
2022-25	Utah Warriors	49	(329)
2026-	New England Free Jacks	10	(75)
International career
Years	Team	Apps	(Points)
- England U18
2013–14	England U19		(3)

Joel Hodgson (born 1 August 1992) is an English rugby union player who plays for New England Free Jacks in Major League Rugby (MLR). He previously played for Newcastle Falcons and Northampton Saints in the Aviva Premiership.

== Rugby Union career ==
=== Professional career ===
He first started with Newcastle Falcons from the summer of 2010. He was loaned out to Rotherham Titans. On 13 June 2014, he left Kingston Park to join Northampton Saints from the 2014-15 season in the Aviva Premiership. After one season at Northampton, he departed to join Yorkshire Carnegie on a one-year deal in the RFU Championship from the 2015-16 season. On 21 April 2016, it was announced he would rejoin Newcastle Falcons.

On 3 August 2022 it was announced that he joined Glasgow Warriors in a short-term deal. He came on a replacement in the friendly match against Ayrshire Bulls on 2 September 2022.

On 13 August 2022 it was announced that he joined Utah Warriors to play in the Major League Rugby.

Following Utah folding after the 2025 MLR season, Hodgson was signed by the New England Free Jacks.

=== International career ===
He played for England U18 at scrum-half; and then moved to fly-half with England U19s.

== Honours ==
Utah Warriors

- All Major League Ruby Second team (2025)
