= Dallas Jackals =

Former professional rugby union team based in Dallas, Texas

- Founded: June 5, 2020
- Disbanded: 2024; 2 years ago
- Location: Arlington, Texas
- Ground: Choctaw Stadium (Capacity: 48,114)
- Most caps: Liam Murray (38)
- Top scorer: Martín Elías (116)
- Most tries: Dewald Kotze (14)
- League: Major League Rugby
- 2024: Western Conference: 4th Playoffs: Conference runner-up
1st kit	2nd kit

The Dallas Jackals were a Major League Rugby team that began play in the 2022 season as an expansion franchise. They were originally going to join the MLR for the 2021 season, but on January 19, 2021, the Jackals delayed their inaugural season to 2022. The team was based in Arlington, Texas, playing at Choctaw Stadium. The club ceased operations in September 2024 after three seasons of play.

== Sponsorship ==
Season	Kit manufacturer	Shirt sponsor
2024	Kappa	
2023	Paladin Sports	Baylor, Scott & White

== Personnel ==
=== Head coach ===
- (Australia) Michael Hodge (2021–2022)
- (Argentina) Augustin Cavalieri (2022-Present)

=== Assistant coach ===
- (Wales) Aaron Jarvis (2022–2022)
- Mario Ledesma (2023)
- Nate Osborne (2024)

=== Captains ===
- (United States) Calvin Gentry (2021)
- (England) Chris Pennell (2022–)
  - (England) Dylan Bower (Vice Captain) (2022)
- Jeronimo Gomez Vara (2023)
- Jeronimo Gomez Vara (Co-Captain) (2024)
- Samuel Golla (Co-Captain) (2024)

== Records ==
=== Season standings ===
Season	Conference	Regular season										Postseason						
Season	Conference	Pos	Pld	W	D	L	F	A	+/−	BP	Pts	Pld	W	L	F	A	+/−	Result
2022	Western	7th	16	0	0	16	198	752	-554	2	4	-	-	-	-	-	-	Did not qualify
2023	Western	6th	16	2	0	14	278	458	-180	11	19	-	-	-	-	-	-	Did not qualify
2024	Western	6th	16	6	0	10	482	450	+32	19	43	2	1	1	59	60	-1	Won Conference Semifinals (Houston Sabercats) 34-22; Lost Conference Final (Seattle Seawolves) 28-25
Totals			48	8	0	40	958	1,660	-702	13	23	2	1	1	59	60	-1	1 postseason appearance

== 2022 season ==
=== Regular season ===
Date	Opponent	Home/Away	Result
February 5	Austin Gilgronis	Away	Lost, 7-43
February 12	San Diego Legion	Away	Lost, 29-37
February 19	Houston SaberCats	Home	Lost, 33-38
February 26	Rugby United NY	Home	Lost, 5-41
March 5	Utah Warriors	Away	Lost, 22-69
March 12	New Orleans Gold	Home	Lost, 26-32
March 19	Seattle Seawolves	Home	Lost, 12-34
April 3	LA Giltinis	Away	Lost, 7-47
April 9	Houston SaberCats	Away	Lost, 6-31
April 16	Austin Gilgronis	Home	Lost, 3-55
April 23	Old Glory DC	Away	Lost, 10-50
April 30	San Diego Legion	Home	Lost, 14-53
May 8	Seattle Seawolves	Away	Lost, 7-74
May 14	Toronto Arrows	Away	Lost, 0-57
May 21	LA Giltinis	Home	Lost, 12-56
June 4	Utah Warriors	Home	Lost, 5-33

== 2023 season ==
The Jackals played 16 games in 2023. They had their first win in team history against the Toronto Arrows on April 1.

=== Regular season ===
Date	Opponent	Home/Away	Location	Result
February 19	Houston SaberCats	Home	Choctaw Stadium	Lost, 33-12
February 25	Utah Warriors	Away	Zions Bank Stadium	Lost, 33-25
March 3	Seattle Seawolves	Home	Choctaw Stadium	Lost, 35-10
March 11	San Diego Legion	Away	Snapdragon Stadium	Lost, 22-0
March 18	Chicago Hounds	Away	SeatGeek Stadium	Lost, 24-22
March 25	New England Free Jacks	Away	Veterans Memorial Stadium	Lost, 10-9
April 1	Toronto Arrows	Home	Choctaw Stadium	Won, 14-11
April 15	Houston SaberCats	Away	SaberCats Stadium	Lost, 33-21
April 22	San Diego Legion	Home	Choctaw Stadium	Lost, 47-38
April 28	Seattle Seawolves	Away	Starfire Sports Complex	Lost, 61-19
May 6	Old Glory DC	Home	Choctaw Stadium	Lost, 7-3
May 13	Utah Warriors	Home	Choctaw Stadium	Lost, 36-26
May 20	Rugby ATL	Away	Silverbacks Park	Won, 27-19
June 4	New York Ironworkers	Away	Memorial Field	Lost, 43-14
June 10	NOLA Gold	Home	Choctaw Stadium	Lost, 15-10
June 17	Chicago Hounds	Home	Choctaw Stadium	Lost, 29-28
