= AJ Alatimu =

Samoan rugby union player

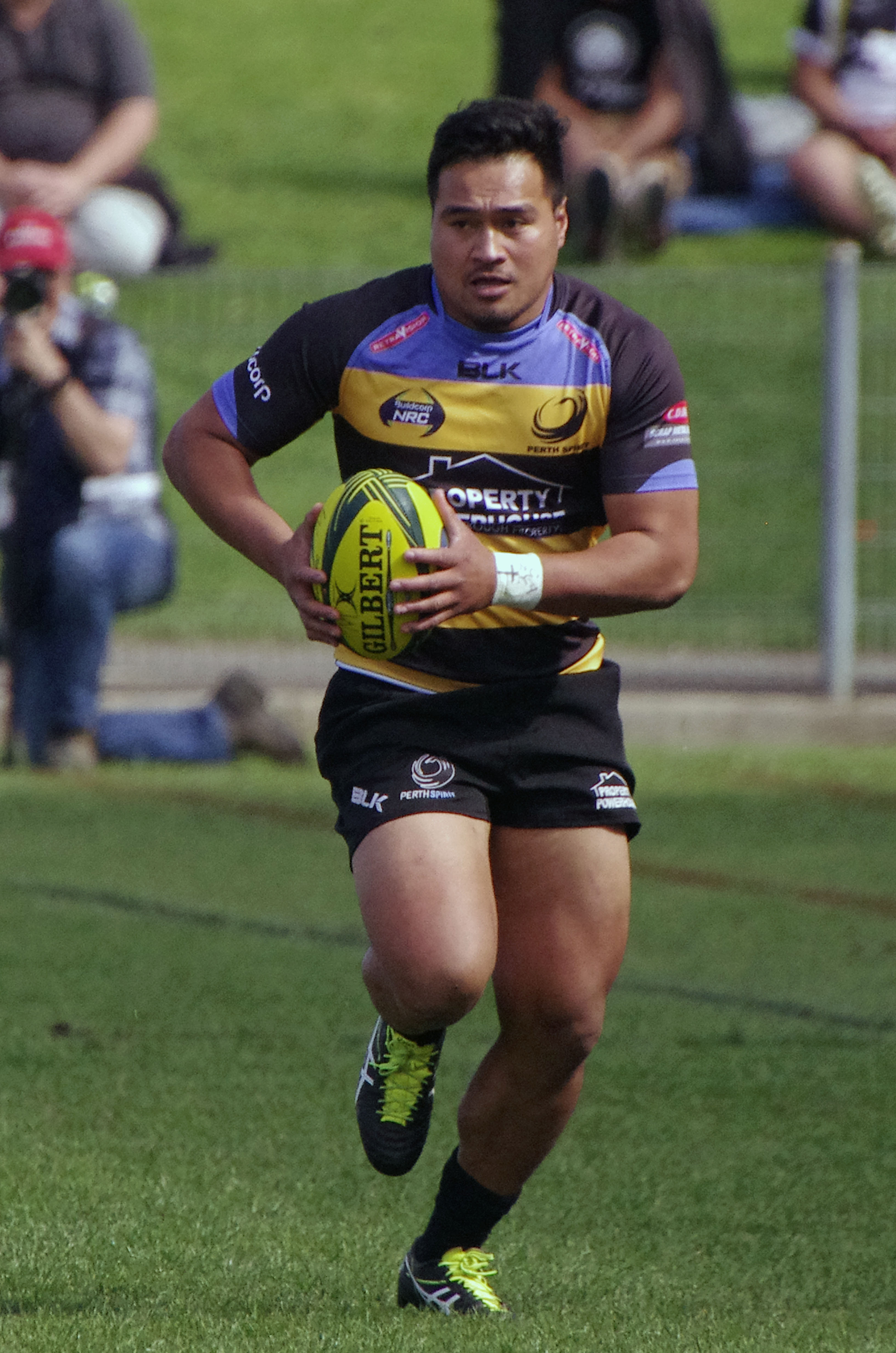
- Full name: AJ Mamoe Alatimu
- Born: 25 March 1993 (age 33) Apia, Samoa
- Height: 173 cm (5 ft 8 in)
- Weight: 108 kg (238 lb; 17 st 0 lb)
- School: James Cook High School

Rugby union career
- Position(s): Fly-half, Centre
- Current team: Counties Manukau
Senior career
Years	Team	Apps	(Points)
2016	Perth Spirit	8	(6)
2017	Brisbane City	5	(14)
2018–2020	Western Force	13	(0)
2021–2023	Seattle Seawolves	45	(321)
2022–	Counties Manukau	30	(140)
2024–2025	Houston Sabercats	29	(183)
- Correct as of 10 May 2021
International career
Years	Team	Apps	(Points)
2013	Samoa U20	4	(28)
2017–2019	Samoa	6	(4)
- Correct as of 20 July 2020

AJ Alatimu (born 25 March 1993) is a Samoan rugby union player who plays as a fly-half or centre for Counties Manukau in the National Provincial Championship in New Zealand. He holds the record as the all-time leading points scorer in Major League Rugby, with a total of 504 points, accumulated while playing for the Seattle Seawolves and the Houston Sabercats between 2021 and 2025.
