= 2024 Major League Rugby final =

Championship rugby match

2024 Major League Rugby Championship Final
- Event: 2024 Major League Rugby season
Seattle Seawolves (Western Conference)	New England Free Jacks (Eastern Conference)
11	20
- Match details
- Date: August 4, 2024
- Venue: Snapdragon Stadium, San Diego, California
- Man of the Match: Jed Melvin (Free Jacks)
- Referee: Luke Rogan United States)
- Attendance: 12,085
- Weather: Partly cloudy day 73.4 °F (23.0 °C); 76% humidity

The 2024 Major League Rugby Championship Final was the sixth Major League Rugby (MLR) championship match, held at the conclusion of the seventh season of the rugby union club competition in North America. The match was played on August 4, 2024, at Snapdragon Stadium in San Diego, California. It was contested by the Seattle Seawolves and New England Free Jacks.

== Background ==
=== Road to the final ===
2024 MLR Eastern Conference
	Club	P	W	D	L	PF	PA	PD	TF	TA	TB	LB	Pts
1	New England Free Jacks	16	11	0	5	463	344	119	65	45	8	3	55
2	New Orleans Gold	16	10	0	6	410	349	61	58	47	8	2	50
3	Chicago Hounds	16	8	1	7	454	387	67	65	51	7	4	45
4	Old Glory DC	16	7	2	7	394	416	-22	50	57	6	4	42
5	Miami Sharks	16	6	0	10	335	389	-54	40	51	4	4	32
6	Anthem Rugby Carolina	16	0	0	16	323	676	-353	47	102	6	1	7
Tiebreakers If teams are level at any stage, tiebreaker criteria are as follows (coin tosses or draw of lots will be used if those below fail): 1. number of matches won 2. the difference between points for and points against 3. the number of tries scored 4. the most points scored 5. the difference between tries for and tries against 6. the fewest red cards received 7. the fewest yellow cards received

2024 MLR Western Conference
	Club	P	W	D	L	PF	PA	PD	TF	TA	TB	LB	Pts
1	Houston SaberCats	16	14	0	2	478	347	131	66	47	11	0	67
2	Seattle Seawolves	16	11	0	5	498	373	125	63	49	9	4	57
3	San Diego Legion	16	11	0	5	421	374	47	51	45	7	4	55
4	Dallas Jackals	16	6	0	10	482	450	32	71	62	10	9	43
5	Utah Warriors	16	5	0	11	424	471	-47	60	67	7	8	35
6	RFC Los Angeles	16	5	1	10	367	473	-106	54	67	8	2	32
Tiebreakers If teams are level at any stage, tiebreaker criteria are as follows (coin tosses or draw of lots will be used if those below fail): 1. number of matches won 2. the difference between points for and points against 3. the number of tries scored 4. the most points scored 5. the difference between tries for and tries against 6. the fewest red cards received 7. the fewest yellow cards received

=== Venue selection ===
On March 14, 2024, MLR announced that Snapdragon Stadium in San Diego would host the Championship Final. It is the home stadium of the San Diego Legion and the third league championship to be hosted in the San Diego area; the Legion had hosted the 2018 final and 2019 final at Torero Stadium.

== Broadcasting ==
The Championship Final was broadcast in the United States on Fox.

== Match ==
August 4, 2024
13:00 PDT (UTC−07)

Seattle Seawolves	11–20	New England Free Jacks
Try: J. Taufete’e 31' m Pen: M. Mason (2/3) 25', 48'; Cards: T. Lopeti (yellow card) 52' to 62'	Report	Try: L. Malan 14'; Pen: J. Potroz (5/5) 9', 28', 40’+1', 45', 52'

Snapdragon Stadium, San Diego
Attendance: 12,085
Referee: Luke Rogan United States)
