= Miami Sharks (rugby union) =

Professional rugby union team from Miami, Florida

- Full name: Miami Sharks Rugby Club
- Founded: 2023; 3 years ago
- Disbanded: 2025; 1 year ago
- Location: Fort Lauderdale, Florida
- Ground: AutoNation Sports Field (Capacity: 5,000)
- Chairman: Ronaldo Strazzolini; Alejandro Macfarlane; Marcos Galperin
- Most caps: Guiseppe du Toit (33)
- Top scorer: Santiago Videla (120)
- Most tries: Manuel Ardao (10)
- League: Major League Rugby
- 2025: Eastern Conference: 4th Playoffs: Conference semi-finalist
Team kit

Official website
- miamisharks.com

The Miami Sharks were an American professional rugby union team based in the Miami metropolitan area that competed in Major League Rugby (MLR). The team was founded in 2023 and began play during the 2024 season. Their home stadium is AutoNation Sports Field in Fort Lauderdale, Florida, on the training grounds of Major League Soccer club Inter Miami CF.

== History ==
On February 8, 2023, Major League Rugby announced that the Miami Sharks would be joining the league in 2024. Owned by Argentine businessmen Ronaldo “Kony” Strazzolini, Alejandro Macfarlane, and Mercado Libre chairman Marcos Galperin, the team appointed former Toronto Arrows executive Mark Winokur as CEO, Mariano Marco as COO and former Argentina U20 manager José Pellicena as head coach. Pellicena has also previously served as an assistant with the Argentina national team under Mario Ledesma and former Super Rugby side Jaguares under Raúl Pérez.

On April 26, 2023 the Sharks announced the signing of Argentine international scrum-half Tomás Cubelli, the first player's signing of the team. The same day, the team held a launch party in Miami with a few Argentine company directors and personalities like tennis player Juan Martín del Potro, model Claudia Albertario and former Argentina international player Juan Martín Hernández who's one of the franchise's ambassadors.

On September 15, 2023 the Sharks announced that a partnership with Inter Miami CF would allow them to play home games at the AutoNation Sports Field, their training facility in Fort Lauderdale. The stadium capacity would be expanded to include up to 5,000 spectators.

== Colors and identity ==
The Sharks' crest displays a blue and white shark with pink strokes alongside a rugby ball and the term "Miami Sharks". The team main colors are neon-styled pink and blue that paid homage to the hit 1980s TV series Miami Vice which has become a symbol of Miami and identified with the city. Miami Vice relied on a pastel color pallet, reminiscent of the Miami Heat "Vice" special uniforms, that became very popular and inspired the team colours.

After the team's founding, the Sharks quickly unveiled three playing kits. One of the jerseys is mainly white with hints of electric blue and bright pink while the others display pink-to-black and blue-to-pink gradations.

Established by Bonaerenses, the team has a strong Argentine connection and ties with Latin America. Two of the three owners played rugby union in Argentina: Macfarlane for Belgrano Athletic Club like Pellicena, and Galperin for Club San Andrés. The latter stated: “We are excited to create a rugby experience in South Florida that will wake the Latin passion in the community and generate a sense of belonging.” Choices of coaching staff and executives reflect the club's Argentine identity.

== Ownership ==
The original ownership pool was led by three Argentine businessmen and company directors: financial services firm Magna Capital president Ronaldo “Kony” Strazzolini, natural gas distribution company Camuzzi Gas main shareholder Alejandro Macfarlane and e-commerce company Mercado Libre funder and CEO Marcos Galperin, the wealthiest man in Argentina with an estimated net worth of $5 billion. Alongside the three founding owners, other investors like Santiago Ocampo, Martín Migoya, Edgardo Defortuna and Gabriel Martino own shares.

== Players and personnel ==
=== Head coaches ===
- (Argentina) José “Cochi” Pellicena (2023-Present)

CEO

- Milagros Cubelli

== Records ==
=== Season standings ===
Season	Conference	Regular season										Postseason						
Season	Conference	Pos	Pld	W	D	L	F	A	+/−	BP	Pts	Pld	W	L	F	A	+/−	Result
2024	Eastern	5th	16	6	0	10	335	389	-54	8	32	-	-	-	-	-	-	Did not qualify
2025	Eastern	4th	16	8	0	8	380	442	-62	9	41	1	0	1	10	32	-22	Lost East Conference Eliminator (New England Free Jacks) 32-10
Totals			32	14	0	18	715	831	-116	17	73	1	0	1	10	32	-22	1 postseason appearance

== Sponsorships ==
The Sharks have signed sponsorship deals with investment advisory company BlackToro and Argentine financial services company VALO.
