= 2021 MLR Draft =

Second annual North American rugby union draft

General information
- Date: August 19, 2021

Overview
- 39 total selections in 3 rounds
- League: Major League Rugby
- First selection: Eric Naposki, Fullback, Dallas Jackals
- Most selections (5): Dallas Jackals
- Fewest selections (2): Rugby United New York

The 2021 MLR Collegiate Draft was the second annual for rugby union in North America. On August 19, 2021, the MLR hosted their second collegiate MLR Draft.

== Format ==
The MLR Collegiate Draft 2021 took place on Thursday, August 19, 2021. For viewers in the United States, the first hour of the Draft was broadcast on FS2 at 6:30 p.m. EDT. Following the first hour, coverage switched to The Rugby Network. For viewers outside of the U.S., the entire Draft was streamed on The Rugby Network beginning at 6:30 p.m. EDT.

Like the inaugural draft, MLR used a "Draft-and-Follow" approach, meaning rights to drafted players was assigned following the MLR Collegiate Draft. MLR teams may activate those rights at any point until the mid-point of the next competitive MLR season AFTER the player is eligible to play in the MLR (through graduation/expiry of college eligibility/relinquishment of college eligibility). Drafting teams may sign those players or trade player rights with other MLR teams.

A player that isn't signed by a team within the above-mentioned rights period, may enter the subsequent year's draft as long as they are eligible. If they lose their Collegiate Draft eligibility, they may enter the MLR if a team desires their services.

=== Order of selections ===
The order of selection was based on the reverse order of the regular season record during the 2021 MLR season. The Draft order is subject to change as teams make trades. Unlike the inaugural draft, this year's draft consisted of three rounds.

The draft order was determined by the reverse order of the league standings but is subject to change as teams make trades. The draft began with the expansion Dallas Jackals making the first pick, followed by the Houston SaberCats, Seattle Seawolves, Toronto Arrows, San Diego Legion, Rugby United New York (via Old Glory DC), Austin Gilgronis, New England Free Jacks, New Orleans Gold, Rugby United New York, Utah Warriors, Rugby ATL, and the 2021 MLR champion Los Angeles Giltinis.

=== Hosts ===
MLR All-Access' Stacy Paetz hosted this year's draft along with returning MLR analyst Dan Power and the first round pick of the Inaugural draft Conner Mooneyham were behind the desk. Also MLR sideline reporter Dani Wexelman returned to interview draftees.

== Player selections ==
Rd	Pick #	MLR team	Player	Pos.	College	Division	Conference	Notes
1	1	Dallas Jackals	Eric Naposki	Fullback	UCLA	D1-A	California/PAC	2018 & 2019 Collegiate All-American 7s (1st team/2nd team)
1	2	Houston SaberCats	Emmanuel Albert	Blindside Flanker	Lindenwood	D1-A	Mid-South	2021 Rudy Scholz Award Winner
1	3	Seattle Seawolves	Tavite Lopeti	Center	Saint Mary's	D1-A	California/PAC	2019 Collegiate All-American (1st team)
1	4	Toronto Arrows	Logan Martin-Feek	Fly-Half	UVic			2019 Canadian University All-Star
1	5	San Diego Legion	Jonah Dietenberger	Lock	Lindenwood	D1-A	Mid-South	
1	6	Rugby United New York (trade with Old Glory DC)	Chase Schor-Haskin	Back Row	Life	D1-A	Mid-South	2021 CRC 7s All-Star
1	7	Austin Gilgronis	Caleb Strum	Wing	Alabama	SCRC	Western Division	
1	8	New England Free Jacks	Cael Hodgson	Center/Wing	Lindenwood	D1-A	Mid-South	
1	9	Utah Warriors	Joey Backe	Hooker	Western Michigan	D1-AA	MAC	2021 CRC 7s All-Star
1	10	Dallas Jackals	DeCor Davis	Prop	Queens of Charlotte	D-2	SAC	
1	11	New Orleans Gold	George Sharpe	Hooker	Arkansas State	D1-A	Mid-South	
1	12	Rugby ATL	Isaac Bales	Hooker	Louisville	D-2		
1	13	LA Giltinis	Sam Klimkowski	Loosehead Prop	Notre Dame College	D1-A	East/Big 10	
2	14	Dallas Jackals	Aaron Gray	Wing	Kutztown	D1-A	East/Big 10	2019 Collegiate All-American (3rd team); 2019 Collegiate All-American 7s (2nd team)
2	15	Houston SaberCats	Tinashe Muchena	Number 8	Lindenwood	D1-A	Mid-South	2021 Rudy Scholz Award Nominee
2	16	Seattle Seawolves	Darell Williams	Wing	Life	D1-A	Mid-South	
2	17	Toronto Arrows	Bryce Worden	Tighthead Prop	UBC			2019 Canadian University All-Star
2	18	San Diego Legion	Thomas Capriotti	Hooker	Penn State	D1-A	Liberty	
2	19	Old Glory DC	Palema Roberts	Center	Life	D1-A	Mid-South	
2	20	Austin Gilgronis	Asa Carter	Blindside Flanker	Arkansas State	D1-A	Mid-South	2017 High School All-American
2	21	New England Free Jacks	Anthony Adamcheck	Prop	Penn State	D1-A	Liberty	
2	22	New Orleans Gold	Christan Alvarez	Scrumhalf	Penn State	D1-A	Liberty	
2	23	Dallas Jackals	Alejandro Torres	Fly-Half	Thomas More			2019 Sudaméria XV
2	24	Utah Warriors	Connor Burns	Fullback	Lindenwood	D1-A	Mid-South	2020 Rudy Scholz Award Nominee
2	25	Rugby ATL	Coleson Warner	Fly-Half	Lindenwood	D1-A	Mid-South	2019 Collegiate All-American 7s (2nd team)
2	26	LA Giltinis	James O'Neill	Openside Flanker	UVic			2017, 2018, 2019 Canadian University All-Star
3	27	Dallas Jackals	Calvin Gentry	Center	Memphis			2019 Collegiate All-American (2nd team)
3	28	Houston SaberCats	Dillon Shotwell	Hooker	Sam Houston State			
3	29	Seattle Seawolves	Ethan Scott	Scrumhalf	Memphis			
3	30	New Orleans Gold	Carmen Consolino	Fly-Half	American International	D1-A	Liberty	
3	31	San Diego Legion	Dominick Iacovino	Fullback	Grand Canyon			
3	32	Old Glory DC	Labi Koi-Larbi	Outside Center	Penn State	D1-A	Liberty	
3	33	Austin Gilgronis	Brandon Asbel	Hooker	Davenport Panthers	MRFU	Iowa Rugby Union	
3	34	New England Free Jacks	Zach Bastres	Outside Center	Northern Colorado			
3	35	Toronto Arrows	Sam Mace	Hooker	Ottawa		RSEQ	
3	36	Rugby United New York	Peter Reyes	Loosehead Prop	Kutztown	D1-A	East/Big 10	
3	37	Utah Warriors	Emerson Prior	Prop	Trent		OUA	
3	38	Rugby ATL	Sean Akins	Openside Flanker	Western Michigan	D1-AA	MAC	
3	39	LA Giltinis	Gerard Lowe	Flanker	Kutztown	D1-A	East/Big 10	2019 Collegiate All-American (3rd team)
