= Wayne van der Bank =

South African rugby union player (born 1997)

- Born: 7 January 1997 (age 29) Pretoria, South Africa
- Height: 1.84 m (6 ft 1/2 in)
- Weight: 89 kg (196 lb)
- School: Hoërskool Menlopark

Rugby union career
- Position: Centre
- Current team: New England Free Jacks
Senior career
Years	Team	Apps	(Points)
2017–2019	Golden Lions XV	12	(15)
2019	Golden Lions	1	(0)
2020–2021	Pumas	11	(5)
2022–	New England Free Jacks	64	(99)
- Correct as of 28 July 2025

Wayne van der Bank (born 7 January 1997) is a South African rugby union player for the New England Free Jacks in Major League Rugby (MLR) in the United States. His regular position is centre.

van der Bank originally started his career playing in South Africa in the Currie Cup with the likes of the Golden Lions and Pumas. He then joined the New England Free Jacks of the MLR where he helped the team complete a three-peat from 2023-2025. He was also the Major League Rugby Player of the Year in 2024.

== Pro career ==
A former Blue Bull youth player Wayne van der Bank was named in the 2017 South Africa U20s side. He was also named in the South African 7s Academy.

van der Bank previously played for the Golden Lions in the Currie Cup and the Golden Lions XV in the Rugby Challenge.

He made his Currie Cup debut for the Golden Lions in July 2019, starting their opening match of the 2019 season against the Pumas at inside centre. From 2020 to 21, Van Der Bank would stay in the Currie Cup now playing for Pumas he appeared in 11 matches scoring 1 trie.

In October of 2021, it was announced van Der Bank signed with the New England Free Jacks of Major League Rugby for the 2022 season. He appeared in 16 matches starting 14, and scored four tries during his first year with the club as they reached the Eastern Conference final.

During the 2023 season van der Bank would start 10 matches for the New England Free Jacks scoring two tries as the team won their first MLR championship.

The following year in 2024 he would have a break out year leading the league in both tackle breaks (69) and defenders beaten (92) as well as scoring 10 tries. This would lead to him being named Major league Rugby player of the year, as well as being named to the All MLR first team. He would also help the Free Jacks win a second consecutive championship beating the Seattle Seawolves in the final. Van der Bank was also featured on SportsCenter's top 10 plays for a trie he scored vs Athem Rugby in round 18 of the 2024 season. He was the only MLR player featured on the show that season.

During the 2025, season he would make his 50th cap for the free jacks. In total he would appear 14 matches making 8 starts and scoring one trie as he and the Free Jacks won a third straight championship at the end of the season.

van der Bank rejoined the Free Jacks for the 2026, campaign and served as captain for multiple games due to injuries suffered by Joe Johnston. He appeared in 7 games scoring two tries as the Free Jacks missed the postseason.

== Coaching career ==
In the Fall 2025, he joined the Harvard University Women’s Rugby team as an assistant coach.

== Honours ==
New England Free Jacks

- Major League championship: 2025
- Major league Rugby player of the year: 2024
- Major League Rugby Championship: 2024
- All Major League Rugby first team: 2024
- Major League Rugby Championship: 2023

== Personal life ==
van der Bank has two brothers and one sister. He is married to his wife Winicha.

In 2022 he studied to become a pastor.
