= Cara Cup =

International club rugby union competition

- Sport: Rugby union
- Instituted: 2019
- Number of teams: 5
- Country: United States; Ireland

The Cara Cup was an international club rugby union competition between the teams of the New England Free Jacks, of Major League Rugby, Connacht, Ulster, Munster, and Leinster, academy sides of Irish Pro14 teams.

== History ==
On November 9, 2018, This Is American Rugby reported that the Irish Rugby Football Union and New England Free Jacks would be joining forces to bring a high-level rugby union competition to the New England region in the spring of 2019. For the inaugural competition, Connacht, Leinster, Munster, and Ulster featured their academy squads, and the Free Jacks featured up-and-coming professional players from both Ireland and the United States.

== 2019 ==
Date	Opponent	Result	Home	Location	Notes
March 16, 2019	Connacht A	38–7	(United States) New England Free Jacks	Union Point Sports Complex	
March 20, 2019	Ulster A	21–44	Connacht A	Union Point Sports Complex	
March 24, 2019	Ulster A	43–15	(United States) New England Free Jacks	Union Point Sports Complex	
April 6, 2019	Munster A	38–19	(United States) New England Free Jacks	Irish Cultural Centre GAA Field	
April 10, 2019	Munster A	49–53	Leinster A	Union Point Sports Complex	
April 14, 2019	Leinster A	55–12	(United States) New England Free Jacks	Harvard Mignone Field	
