= Scott Mathie =

Former South African rugby union player/current coach

- Full name: Scott Mathie
- Born: 1 February 1983 (age 43) Durban
- Height: 1.80 m (5 ft 11 in)
- Weight: 82 kg (181 lb; 12 st 13 lb)
- Occupation: Head Coach

Rugby union career
- Position: Scrum-half
- Current team: Eastern Province Kings
Youth career
- 2002–2003: Blue Bulls
Senior career
Years	Team	Apps	(Points)
2004	Blue Bulls	16	(15)
2006–2008	Sharks	5	(0)
2006–2008	Sharks (Currie Cup)	42	(20)
2008–2011	Leeds Carnegie	59	(20)
2011–2012	Sale Sharks	10	(10)
2012–2013	Eastern Province Kings	23	(0)
- Correct as of 8 October 2013
Coaching career
- Years: Team
- 2019-2020: Griquas
- 2022-2024: New England Free Jacks
- 2024-2026: Edinburgh Rugby
- 2026-: Sharks
- Correct as of 6 February 2022

Scott Mathie (born 1 February 1983 in Durban, South Africa) is a rugby union current coach and former player. He played as a scrum-half for the Blue Bulls, Sharks, Leeds Carnegie, Sale Sharks and Eastern Province Kings. He retired in October 2013. He was previously the head coach of the New England Free Jacks in Major League Rugby (MLR). He is now the attacks coach at Sharks.

== Professional career ==
Mathie would play at University of Pretoria. He would then continue his rugby career with joined Blue Bulls. Winning the currie cup in 2004. He would then play 2 seasons with the Sharks. Then from 2008-2011 he would play for Leeds Carnegie making 59 appearances and scoring 20 points. As well as winning promotion to the English Premiership in his first year. He would then play for Eastern Province Kings in 2012. He made 23 appearances for them in 2012 and 2013. He was initially named in the Southern Kings squad for the 2013 Super Rugby season, but was later released to the 2013 Vodacom Cup squad.

== Coaching career ==
After retirement Mathie would find himself as the Head Coach of his alma mater Durban High School. He was later appointed assistant coach of the Griquas under Brent Ranse van Rensburg. He was further appointed as Head coach of the Griquas for the 2020-2021 season on the 5 September 2019. During his time with Griquas he was nicknamed “The Giant Killer” after leading his side to electrifying victories over Super Rugby-level opponents.

He was appointed as head coach of the New England Free Jacks for the 2022 season on 9 September 2021.

In Mathie first season as head coach of the free jacks he would find immediate success. Leading the team to a 13-3 record and their first ever playoff berth finishing as the 1 seed in the eastern conference. As the 1 seed the free jacks got to host the eastern conference championship but they would ultimately fall to New York rugby 24-16. Mathie would be named MLR Coach of the year at the end of the season. Being the first free jacks coach to given the honor. After a disappointing end to his first year Mathie and the free jacks would have a historic season the following year. During the 2023 season Mathie would lead the free jacks to a franchise record 14-2 record and once again securing the 1 seed in the eastern conference. They would once again host the eastern conference championship and go on to win fairly easily 25-7 over DC old glory. Securing the first conference championship in team history. Punching their ticket to their first appearance in the MLR championship. Mathie and the team would travel to seat geek stadium to play the San Diego legion for the 2023 MLR championship. Mathie and his team would go on to win a nail biter 25-24 to win the first MLR championship in team history. In 2024 Mathie would lead the free jacks to another successful season going 11-5 and getting the 1 seed for their 3rd year in a row. The MLR would add an extra playoff game during this season. The free jacks would beat DC old glory in the semi finals and would then go on to win the eastern conference championship for the second year in a row beating the Chicago Hounds. They would then play Seattle in the championship game. Mathie’s side would win the match 20-11 to go back to back as MLR champions making Mathie the first ever MLR coach to achieve that honor. At the end of the season he would be named coach of the year for the second time. Mathie would finish his time with the free jacks with a overall record of 38-10 and a playoff record of 5-1. Securing his spot in free jacks history.

On 16 August 2024 he was appointed Attack and Backs Coach at Edinburgh Rugby, a position he would hold for two seasons.

On 18 February 2026 it was announced Mathie had left Edinburgh to take the attack coaching position for Sharks.

== Head coaching record ==
Season	Team	Record	Standing	Postseason
2022	New England Free jacks	13-3	1st east	lost in eastern conference championship (24-16) Vs rugby New York
2023	New England Free jacks	14-2	1st east	Won Eastern conference Championship (25-7) Vs DC old Glory Won MLR Championship (25-24) Vs San Diego Legion
2024	New England Free jacks	11-5	1st east	Won Eastern conference semi final (33-29) Vs Dc old glory Won Eastern conference championship (23-17) Vs Chicago Hounds Won MLR championship (20-11) Vs Seattle Seawolves

== Honours ==
As a coach

New England free jacks

- x2 Major League Rugby Championship: 2023, 2024
- x2 Major League Rugby Coach of the: 2022, 2024

As a player

Blue Bulls

- Currie cup: 2004

Leads Carnegie

- Yorkshire Cup: 2009
- National Division One: 2008–09

Other

Following the New England Free Jacks 2024 championship win, Mathie and the Free Jacks were honored by the New England Patriots on 8 August 2024 during the Patriots game preseason game vs. the Carolina Panthers he was honored as the teams keeper of the light ringing Gillette Stadiums fog bell at the lighthouse prior to the kick off the game.

== Personal life ==
Mathie is married to his wife Leigh the couple have 2 children together.

Mathie was born to a South African mother and an English father from Newcastle. Because of this Mathie is a fan of the football club Newcastle United.
