= Ryan Martin (rugby union) =

New Zealand rugby union coach

- Born: New Zealand
- Occupation: Head Coach

Rugby union career
Coaching career
- Years: Team
- 2011-2016: Otago Boys High School
- 2016-2018: New Zealand Barbarians Schools side
- 2018-2020: Otago Mitre (Attack)
- 2018-2019: Asia Pacific Dragons
- 2020-2021: New England Free Jacks
- 2019-21: Melbourne Rebels (Attack)
- 2021-2024: Toyota Verblitz (Attack and backs)
- 2024: Northland Rugby Union (Attack)
- 2024-: New England free jacks
- 2025-: Northland Rugby Union

Ryan Martin is a New Zealand rugby union coach that has spent a majority of his career in New Zealand. He is currently the head coach of the New England Free Jacks of the MLR and Northland Rugby Union.

== Coaching career ==
A former schoolteacher, Martin began his coaching career in New Zealand at the Under-10 level in 2008. In 2011, he became the coach of his alma mater, Otago Boys High School. In 2012, he led the team to the national finals. During his five-year tenure, Martin maintained the team’s position in upper echelon of New Zealand Rugby and won 64 games.

In 2016, Martin was nationally recognized and assumed the head coaching role of the New Zealand Barbarians Schools side, working with the future talent of New Zealand Rugby at the international level. He led the Barbarians to an undefeated record against both Australian and Fijian Schools, winning the Trans-Tasman shield.

Martin then took the role of attack coach for the Otago Mitre 10 team for 2 seasons. He also served as the head coach of the Asia Pacific Dragons for one season, leading them in the 2019 global rapid rugby season.

In 2020 Martin, became the head coach for the New England Free Jacks, initially signing a three-year deal with the team. He led them to a 10–6 record during the 2021 season, though they missed the playoffs. Martin left the team after one to begin working with the Melbourne Rebels.

After completing his contract with the Rebels, Martin moved to Japan, serving as the attack and backs coach for Toyota Verblitz.

In 2024, Martin was named as the attack coach for Northland Rugby. Later that same year, it was also announced that he would return to the New England Free Jacks during the 2025 season for a second stint as head coach.

During the 2025 MLR season, Martin led the Free Jacks to an 11–5 record, finishing first in the Eastern conference. They went on to defeat the Miami Sharks 32–10 in the first round of the playoffs, followed by a narrow 21–20 win over the Chicago Hounds to win the Eastern conference championship. Martin and the Free Jacks then faced the Houston SaberCats in the 2025 Major League Rugby final, winning 28–22 to secure the Championship Shield. In the process, Martin helped the Free Jacks complete the first three-peat in North America professional sports since 2002, as the club had also won the title in the previous two seasons. For his efforts, Martin was named the Major league rugby coach of the year.

In 2025 Martin was promoted to head coach of Northland Rugby. He coached the team to a 5-1-4 record during the 2025 season however they finished in 9th place, narrowly missing the playoffs.

In August 2026, Martin helped lead Northland past Canterbury 36-12 to win the Ranfurly Shield, ending a 48 year drought since the Union had held the Shield. That season Martin led the club to more NPC wins than in any season in their history. During the postseason the club made the NPC championship final for the first time however they were defeated by Canterbury 43-24.

== Head coaching record ==
Team	Year	Record	Placement	Playoffs
Asia Pacific Dragons	2019	1–3	3rd	Did not qualify
New England Free Jacks	2021	10–6	4th east	Did not qualify
New England Free Jacks	2025	11–5	1st east	Won Eastern conference semi final (32-10) Vs Miami sharks; Won Eastern conference championship (21-20) Vs Chicago Hounds; Won MLR championship (28-22) Vs Houston Sabercats
Northland	2025	5-1-4	9th	Did not qualify
New England Free Jacks	2026	3-7	5th	Did not qualify
Northland	2026	7-3	2nd	Won Quarter-finals (26-21) vs. Tasman; Won Semifinals (38-19) vs. Otago; Lost Finals (43-23) vs. Canterbury

== Honours ==
New England free jacks

- Major League Rugby championship: (2025)
- Major league rugby coach of the year: (2025)

Northland Taniwha

- Ranfurly shield -Aug 26
