= Rugby Football Club Los Angeles =

Professional Rugby Union Team from Los Angeles, California, United States

Rugby FC Los Angeles
- Founded: 2018; 8 years ago
- Disbanded: July 30, 2025; 15 months ago
- Location: Los Angeles, California
- Ground: Wallis Annenberg Stadium (Capacity: 2,145)
- Most caps: Matt Heaton (69)
- Top scorer: Kurt Coleman (174)
- Most tries: Jason Damm (22)
- League: Major League Rugby
- 2025: Western Conference: 3rd Playoffs: Conference semi-finalist
1st kit	2nd kit

Official website
- rugbyfcla.com

Rugby FC Los Angeles (RFCLA) were an American professional rugby union team based in Los Angeles, California, that competed in Major League Rugby (MLR). The team began play in 2020 as Rugby ATL, based in Atlanta, Georgia, but announced they would relocate to Los Angeles for the 2024 season, under new ownership. In July 2025 it was announced that the team would merge with San Diego Legion to create a single, statewide rugby franchise, California Legion. They won the 2022 Rugby Allstars Championship with Jason Damm scoring all tries in the final against the Atlanta Hawks 35-0

== History ==
=== Rugby ATL ===
On September 21, 2018, Major League Rugby announced that Atlanta was one of the expansion teams joining the league for the 2020 season. The team name "Rugby ATL" was revealed on February 26, 2019. The team was unofficially known as the Rattlers and in 2021 an alternate logo with a rattlesnake was unveiled. Rugby ATL played its first three seasons at Lupo Family Field on the campus of Life University in the Atlanta suburb of Marietta. The field was damaged by flooding in September 2021 and the team moved to Silverbacks Park ahead of the 2022 season.

Following the death of their original team owner, S. Marcus Calloway, the ownership of the team was placed into an investment group, acquiring control of the franchise on an interim basis. The move kept Rugby ATL operational, until a permanent ownership group was acquired in 2023.

=== Rugby FC Los Angeles ===
On August 2, 2023, Major League Rugby announced that Rugby ATL would be relocating to a yet-to-be announced location for the 2024 season. On August 17, it was announced the team would relocate to Los Angeles. On December 21, it was announced that the team would be renamed to Rugby FC Los Angeles, abbreviated to RFCLA. This marked the return of Major League Rugby back to Los Angeles since the removal of the former LA Giltinis in October 2022. On the same day, it was announced that RFCLA would play out of Dignity Health Sports Park in Carson, CA.

In July 2025 it was announced that Rugby Football Club Los Angeles and San Diego Legion would unite to form a single, statewide rugby franchise, The California Legion.

== Sponsorship ==
Season	Kit manufacturer	Shirt sponsor	Other Shirt sponsor(s)
2019	Canterbury	None	None
2020–2023	Paladin Sports	Barbour Orthopedics and Spine	None
2020–2023	Paladin Sports	Barbour Orthopedics and Spine	Terrapin Beer Co. Body Armor Sports Drink

== Personnel ==
=== Head coaches ===
- (United States) Scott Lawrence (2020-2022)
- (New Zealand) Stephen Brett (2022–2024)
- (Australia) Stephen Hoiles (2025)

=== Assistant coaches ===
- (New Zealand) Stephen Brett (Attack, 2020–2021)
- (South Africa) Blake Bradford (2022–2025)

=== Captains ===
- Matt Heaton (2020–2025) (co-captain)
- Ryan Nell (2020–2025) (co-captain)

== Records ==
=== Season standings ===
Season	Conference	Regular season										Postseason						
Season	Conference	Pos	Pld	W	D	L	F	A	+/−	BP	Pts	Pld	W	L	F	A	+/−	Result
Rugby ATL
2020 (Note: 2020 regular season shortened and playoffs cancelled due to the COVID-19 pandemic.)	Eastern	5th	5	2	0	3	116	110	+6	4	12	-	-	-	-	-	-	Cancelled
2021	Eastern	2nd	16	11	0	5	420	321	+99	13	57	2	1	1	27	40	-13	Won East Conference Final (Rugby United New York) 10–9; Lost Major League Rugby final (LA Giltinis) 17–31
2022	Eastern	2nd	16	11	0	5	468	340	+128	11	57	1	0	1	19	26	-7	Lost East Conference Eliminator (Rugby New York) 19–26
2023	Eastern	5th	16	5	1	10	355	428	-73	6	28	-	-	-	-	-	-	Did not qualify
Rugby Football Club Los Angeles
2024	Western	6th	16	5	1	10	367	473	-106	10	32	-	-	-	-	-	-	Did not qualify
2025	Western	3rd	16	8	1	7	501	497	+4	17	51	1	0	1	21	27	-6	Lost West Conference Eliminator (Houston SaberCats) 27-21
Totals			85	42	3	40	2,227	2,169	+58	55	209	4	1	3	67	93	-26	3 postseason appearances

== 404 Rugby (2019) ==
Rugby ATL started with an exhibition side, called 404 Rugby. From September to November 2019, 404 Rugby played exhibition matches against Mystic River, NYAC, Old Blue, and USA Rugby men's club champions Life University.

=== 2019 season ===
All games in the 2019 season were exhibition games and did not count in the MLR standings.

Date	Opponent	Home/Away	Location	Result
September 7	Mystic River	Away	Pine Banks	50–25
September 14	Old Blue	Home	Lupo Family Field	45–6
September 28	New York Athletic Club	Away	Travers Island	42–17
October 5	Life University	Away	Lupo Family Field	22–21
October 12	New Orleans	Away	Gretna Park	55–24
October 19	Old Blue	Away	Columbia Soccer Stadium	17–25
November 2	New York Athletic Club	Home	Lupo Family Field	66–7
November 9	Life University	Home	Lupo Family Field	30–18

== 2020 season ==
On March 12, 2020, MLR announced the season would go on hiatus immediately for 30 days due to fears surrounding the 2019–2020 coronavirus pandemic. It was cancelled the following week

=== Regular season ===
Date	Opponent	Home/Away	Location	Result
February 9	Utah Warriors	Home	Life University Running Eagles Stadium	Won, 28–19
February 16	New Orleans Gold	Away	Gold Mine	Won, 22–10
February 23	Rugby United New York	Home	Life University Running Eagles Stadium	Lost, 19–22
March 1	Toronto Arrows	Home	Life University Running Eagles Stadium	Lost, 18–28
March 8	Old Glory DC	Away	Cardinal Stadium	Lost, 29–31
March 22	New England Free Jacks	Home	Life University Running Eagles Stadium	Cancelled
March 28	Austin Gilgronis	Away	Round Rock Multipurpose Complex	Cancelled
April 5	New Orleans Gold	Home	Life University Running Eagles Stadium	Cancelled
April 10	Rugby United New York	Away	MCU Park	Cancelled
April 19	Toronto Arrows	Away	Lamport Stadium	Cancelled
April 26	San Diego Legion	Home	Life University Running Eagles Stadium	Cancelled
May 2	Colorado Raptors	Away	Infinity Park	Cancelled
May 10	Seattle Seawolves	Home	Life University Running Eagles Stadium	Cancelled
May 17	Old Glory DC	Home	Life University Running Eagles Stadium	Cancelled
May 23	Houston SaberCats	Away	Aveva Stadium	Cancelled
May 30	New England Free Jacks	Away	Union Point Sports Complex	Cancelled

== 2021 season ==
=== Regular season ===
Date	Opponent	Home/Away	Result
March 20	Toronto Arrows	Home	Won, 21–14
March 27	Old Glory DC	Away	Lost, 23–30
April 3	San Diego Legion	Home	Won, 41–22
April 11	Rugby United New York	Home	Lost, 17–27
April 17	Austin Gilgronis	Away	Lost, 15–17
April 24	New Orleans Gold	Home	Won, 38–28
May 9	Toronto Arrows	Away	Won, 33–29
May 15	New England Free Jacks	Home	Won, 33–18
May 23	Seattle Seawolves	Away	Won, 25–6
May 29	LA Giltinis	Home	Won, 17–12
June 5	New Orleans Gold	Away	Won, 8–7
June 13	Rugby United New York	Away	Lost, 24–31
June 19	Houston SaberCats	Home	Won, 33–15
June 26	Old Glory DC	Home	Won, 32–12
July 10	Utah Warriors	Away	Won, 41–31
July 18	New England Free Jacks	Away	Lost, 19–22

=== Postseason ===
Date	Opponent	Home/Away	Result
July 24	Rugby United New York	Home	Won, 10–9
August 1	LA Giltinis	Away	Lost, 17–31

== 2022 season ==
=== Regular season ===
Date	Opponent	Home/Away	Result
February 5	Old Glory DC	Home	Won, 55–22
February 12	New Orleans Gold	Away	Won, 14–9
February 19	Rugby New York	Home	Lost, 31–36
March 5	Houston SaberCats	Home	Won, 29–22
March 12	Austin Gilgronis	Home	Won, 29–14
March 20	Old Glory DC	Away	Won, 27–13
March 26	New England Free Jacks	Home	Lost, 27-41
April 2	Toronto Arrows	Away	Won 20-14
April 9	New Orleans Gold	Away	Won, 34-17
April 24	San Diego Legion	Away	Won, 30-17
April 30	LA Giltinis	Home	Lost, 19-31
May 7	Utah Warriors	Away	Lost, 26-44
May 13	New England Free Jacks	Away	Lost, 10-15
May 22	Rugby New York	Away	Won, 38-3
May 28	Toronto Arrows	Home	Won, 34-23
June 3	New Orleans Gold	Home	Won, 45-19

=== Postseason ===
Round	Date	Opponent	Home/Away	Result
East Eliminator	June 11	Rugby New York	Home	Lost, 19–26

== 2023 season ==
=== Regular season ===
Date	Opponent	Home/Away	Location	Result
February 17	Toronto Arrows	Home	Silverbacks Park	Won, 17–10
February 24	Seattle Seawolves	Away	Starfire Sports Complex	Lost, 28–22
March 4	NOLA Gold	Home	Silverbacks Park	Won, 29–16
March 18	San Diego Legion	Home	Silverbacks Park	Lost, 10–35
March 25	Houston SaberCats	Away	SaberCats Stadium	Lost, 40–28
April 2	New York Ironworkers	Away	Memorial Field	Lost, 31–20
April 8	Old Glory DC	Home	Silverbacks Park	Won, 35–27
April 15	NOLA Gold	Away	The Gold Mine	Won, 23–7
April 22	New England Free Jacks	Away	Veterans Memorial Stadium	Lost, 23–13
May 6	Chicago Hounds	Home	Silverbacks Park	Won, 27–12
May 12	Toronto Arrows	Away	York Lions Stadium	Draw, 34–34
May 20	Dallas Jackals	Home	Silverbacks Park	Lost, 27–19
May 27	Utah Warriors	Away	Zions Bank Stadium	Lost, 28–12
June 2	New England Free Jacks	Home	Silverbacks Park	Lost, 35–14
June 10	New York Ironworkers	Home	Silverbacks Park	Lost, 39–24
June 17	Old Glory DC	Away	Segra Field	Lost, 36–28
