= Union Point Sports Complex =

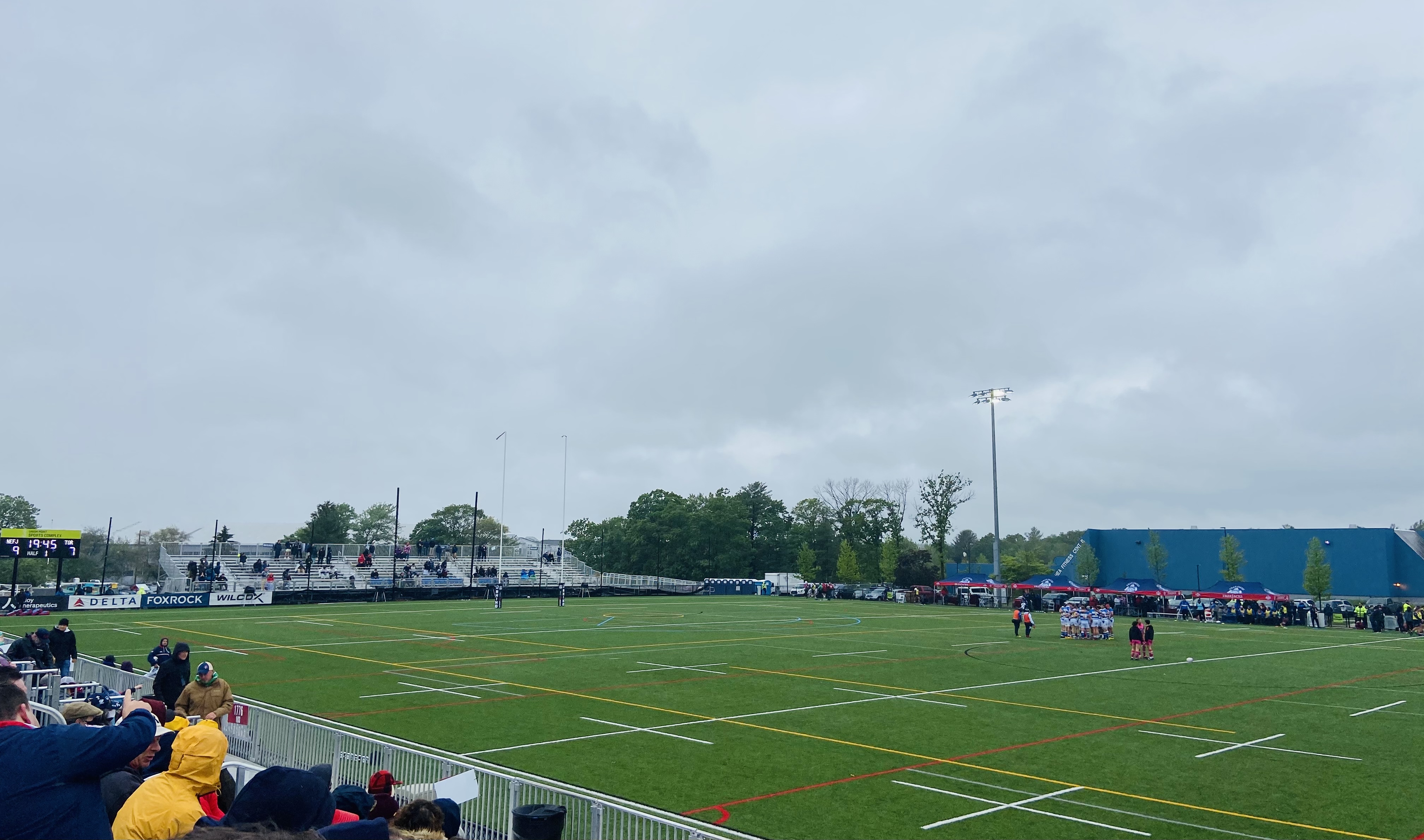
- Union Point Sports Complex Field 3
- Interactive map of Union Point Sports Complex
- Location: 170 Memorial Grove Avenue; Weymouth, Massachusetts, U.S.
- Coordinates: 42.160395°N 70.941585°W
- Surface: Synthetic turf
- Field size: 100m x 68m

Tenants
- Boston RFC (NERFU); New England Free Jacks (MLR) (2018–2021)

Website
- Website

Union Point Sports Complex is a multi-purpose sports complex in Weymouth, Massachusetts, and was home to the New England Free Jacks of Major League Rugby.

== History ==
Union Point is a 25-acre sports complex with indoor and outdoor facilities and is used for a variety of field sports; such as lacrosse, rugby union, and soccer.

On December 1, 2018, Union Point hosted its first professional rugby match, between the Free Jacks and Rugby United New York. Rugby United New York would win the match 38 to 35.

In the spring of 2019, Union Point hosted four matches of the Cara Cup, a rugby union competition hosted by the Free Jacks.

In the fall of 2019, the Free Jacks announced their schedule for the 2020 season and that Union Point would be their official home venue for their first full season in MLR.

== Rugby ==
=== International club matches ===
Date	Opponent	Result	Home	Competition	Notes
March 16, 2019	Connacht A (Ireland)	38–7	(United States) New England Free Jacks	Cara Cup	
March 20, 2019	Ulster A (Ireland)	21–44	(Ireland) Connacht A	Cara Cup	
March 24, 2019	Ulster A (Ireland)	43–15	(United States) New England Free Jacks	Cara Cup	
April 10, 2019	Munster A (Ireland)	49–53	(Ireland) Leinster A	Cara Cup	

== Facilities ==
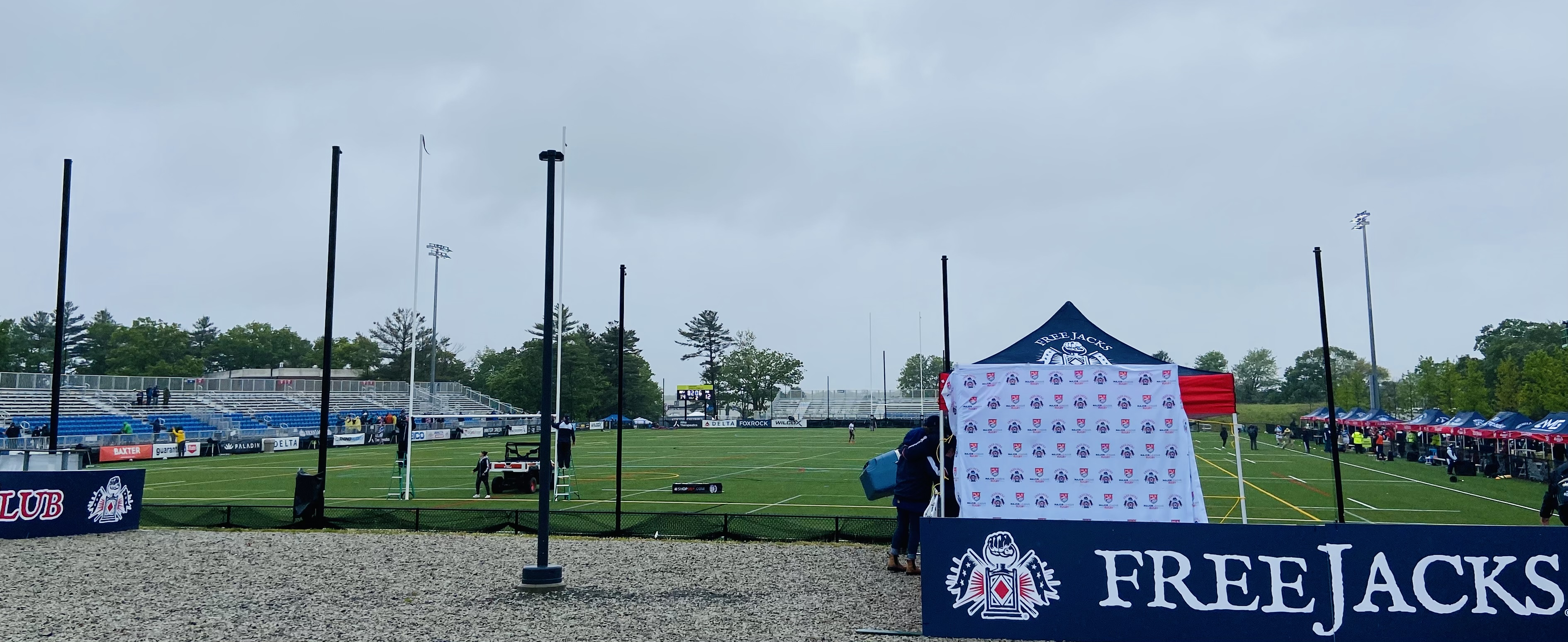
Field 3: view behind the posts

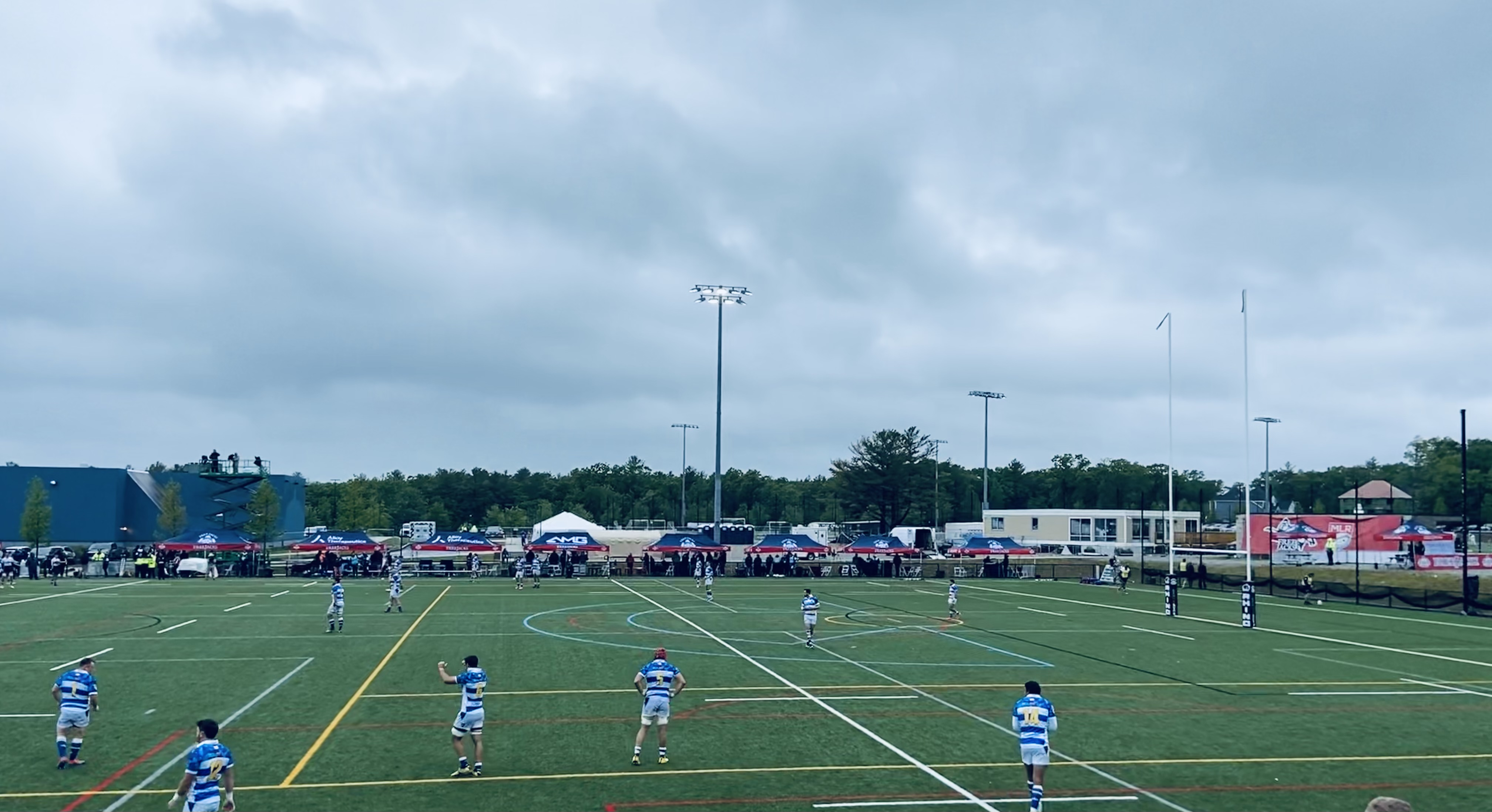
Field 3: view from the main stand

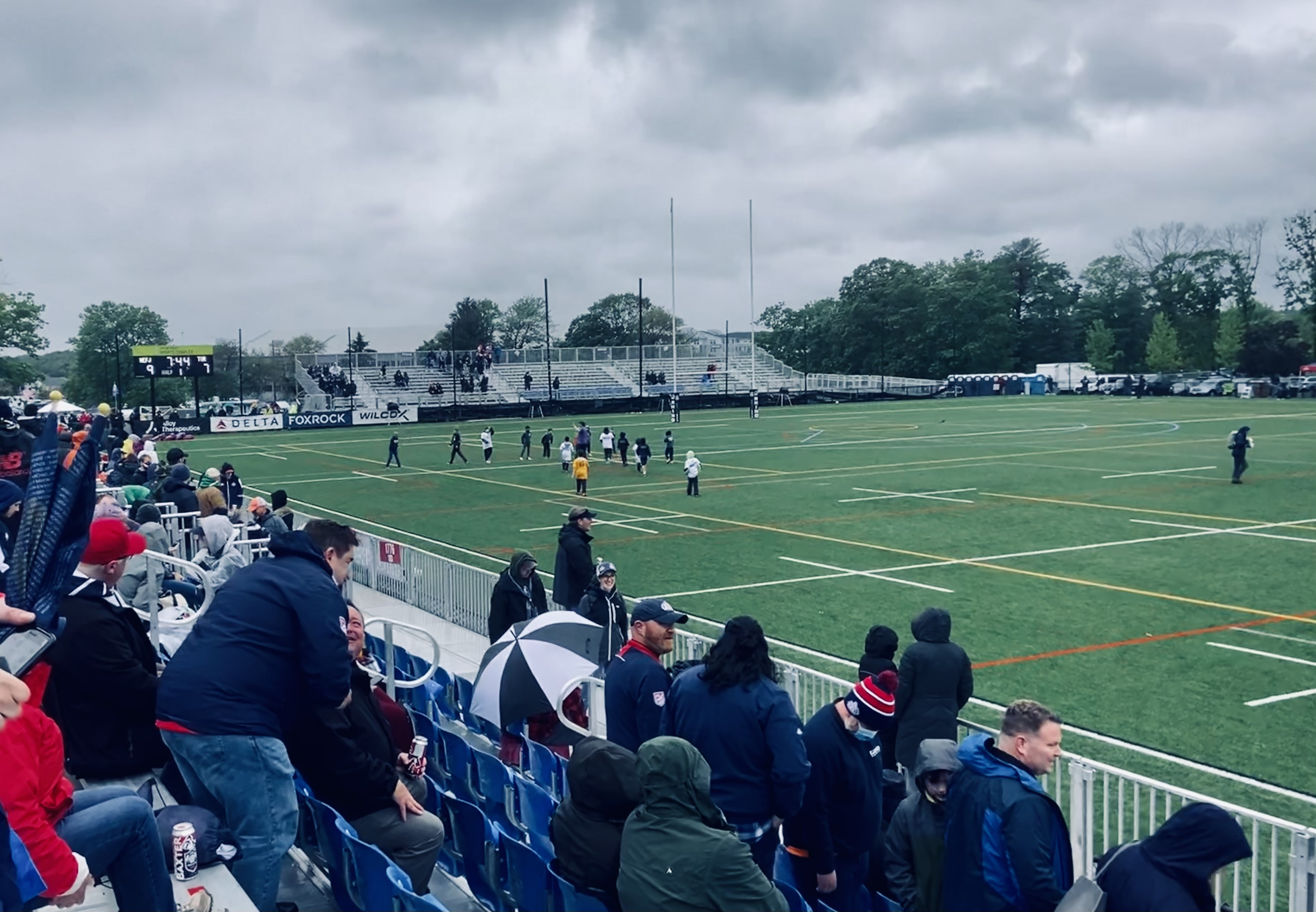
Field 3: view from the main stand

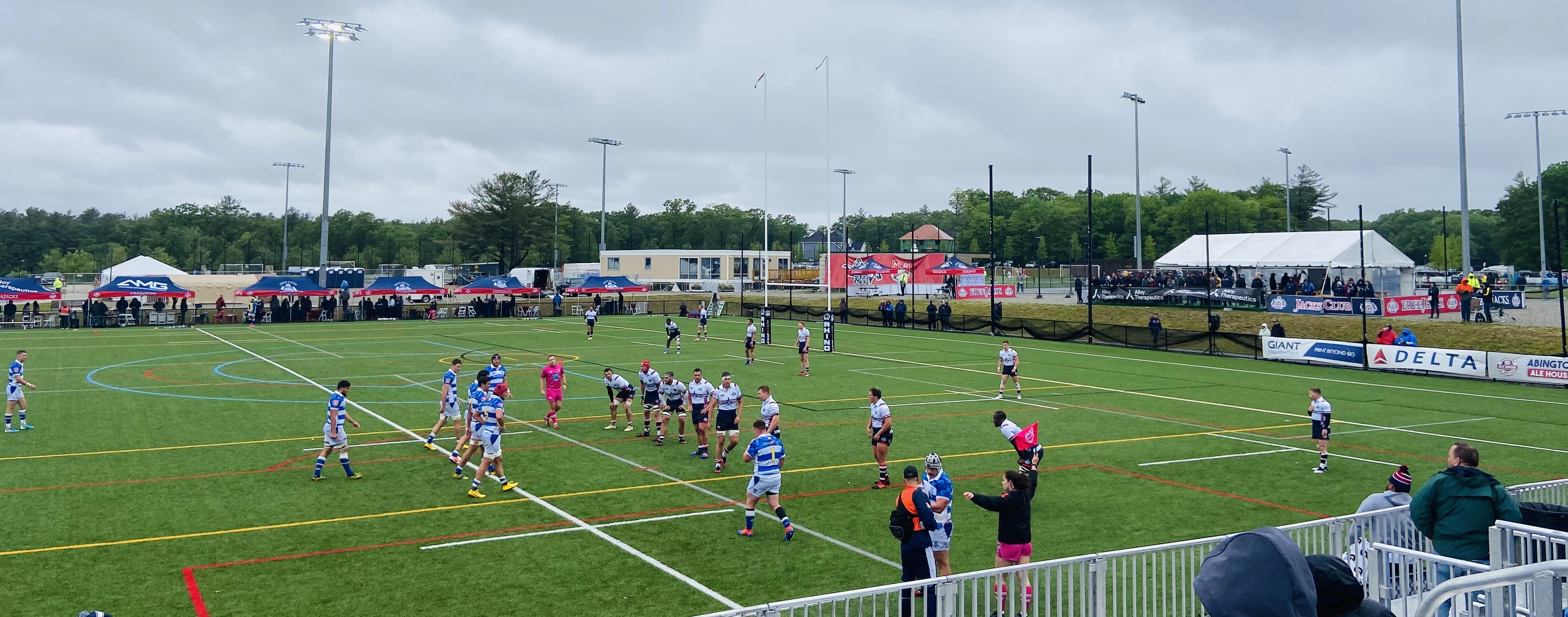
Field 3: 2021 New England Free Jacks vs Toronto Sparrows match
