= New Orleans Gold =

Professional rugby union team from New Orleans, Louisiana

(United States) New Orleans Gold
- Founded: 2017
- Disbanded: 2025; 1 year ago
- Location: Metairie, Louisiana
- Ground: Gold Mine on Airline (Capacity: 10,000)
- Most caps: Moni Tongaʻuiha (102)
- Top scorer: JP Eloff (219)
- Most tries: Pat O'Toole (17)
- League: Major League Rugby
- 2025: Eastern Conference: 5th Playoffs: DNQ
1st kit	2nd kit

Official website
- www.nolagoldrugby.com

The New Orleans Gold (stylized as NOLA Gold) were an American professional rugby union team based in the New Orleans metropolitan area that competed in Major League Rugby (MLR). The team was founded in 2017. Since January 2020, French rugby power ASM Clermont Auvergne has owned a minority stake in the team. The team withdrew from competition at the end of the 2025 Major League Rugby season, though a report by The Guardian suggested the Gold could rejoin the league at a later time.

== Home field ==
=== Gold Mine on Airline ===
The team played at the Gold Mine on Airline, also known as the Shrine on Airline and was previously Zephyr Field, in Metairie, Louisiana, on the East Bank of the New Orleans metropolitan area.

=== Joe Zimmerman Stadium ===
For the first two seasons of Major League Rugby in 2018 and 2019, the team played at Joe Zimmerman Stadium under the branding of Gold Stadium. The natural turf field with grandstand seating for up to 3,000 people is located on the West Bank at Marrero, Louisiana.

== Broadcasts ==
Home games were previously shown on Cox Sports Television. Ian McNulty and Geoffrey Ormsby are the on air talent.

In 2025, the Gulf Coast Sports & Entertainment Network became the official broadcast network of the team.

== Sponsorship ==
For the 2022 season, NOLA Gold partnered with local Louisiana, Port Orleans Brewing Company to make "GOLDen Ale". These 16-ounce cans will be available for purchase in the brewery's tap room and on tap at the start of the season. It will also be sold throughout the season in the team's home stadium, the Shrine on Airline.

Season	Kit manufacturer	Shirt sponsor
2018	XBlades	None
2019	XBlades	Louisiana Tourism
2020	Paladin Sports	None
2021	Paladin Sports	None
2022	Paladin Sports	Louisiana Tourism
2023	Paladin Sports	LCMC Health
2024	Paladin Sports	LCMC Health

== Players and personnel ==
=== Head coaches ===
- (Australia) Nate Osborne (2018–2021)
- (Samoa) Kane Thompson (2022–2023)
- (New Zealand) Cory Brown (2024)
- (New Zealand) Danny Lee (2025)

=== Assistant coaches ===
- (Samoa) Kane Thompson, forwards and defense (2019–2021, 2024-2025)
- (New Zealand) Taylor Howden, backs (2022-2025)
- Todd Fitzgerald (2017-2025), Assistant GM/assistant head coach/assistant coach/Director of Player Personnel
- (France) Nicolas Godignon, scrum, breakdown
- (New Zealand) Carlos Spencer (2022)

=== Captains ===
- Taylor Howden (2018)
- Eric Howard (2019–2020)
- Kyle Baillie (2021)
- Cam Dolan (2022–2025)

== Records ==
=== Season standings ===
Season	Conference	Regular season										Postseason						
Season	Conference	Pos	Pld	W	D	L	F	A	+/−	BP	Pts	Pld	W	L	F	A	+/−	Result
2018	-	6th	8	3	0	5	209	291	-82	5	17	-	-	-	-	-	-	Did not qualify
2019	-	5th	16	9	0	7	463	403	+60	17	53	-	-	-	-	-	-	Did not qualify
2020 (Note: 2020 regular season shortened and playoffs cancelled due to the COVID-19 pandemic.)	Eastern	3rd	5	3	0	2	135	102	+33	4	16	-	-	-	-	-	-	Cancelled
2021	Eastern	3rd	16	10	1	5	375	378	-3	9	51	-	-	-	-	-	-	Did not qualify
2022	Eastern	5th	16	4	0	12	358	517	-159	6	25	-	-	-	-	-	-	Did not qualify
2023	Eastern	4th	16	7	0	9	339	435	-96	6	35	-	-	-	-	-	-	Did not qualify
2024	Eastern	2nd	16	10	0	6	410	349	+61	10	50	1	0	1	21	45	-24	Lost Conference Semifinal (Chicago Hounds) 45–21
2025	Eastern	5th	16	4	0	12	428	473	-45	16	32	-	-	-	-	-	-	Did not qualify
Totals			109	50	1	58	2,717	2,948	-231	67	244	-	-	-	-	-	-	1 postseason appearance

== 2018 season ==
=== Exhibitions ===
Date	Opponent	Home/Away	Result
January 20	Capital Selects	Home	Won, 68–15
February 24	Houston SaberCats	Away	Won, 30–12
March 10	Glendale Raptors	Home	Lost, 14–38
March 28	Houston SaberCats	Home	Draw, 32–32
March 31	Austin Elite	Home	Won, 48–17
April 7	Austin Elite	Away	Won, 38–10

=== Regular season ===
Date	Opponent	Home/Away	Result
April 21	Houston SaberCats	Away	Won, 35–26
May 3	Austin Elite	Away	Lost, 17–30
May 12	Seattle Seawolves	Home	Lost, 29–31
May 19	Houston SaberCats	Home	Won, 24–20
May 27	Seattle Seawolves	Away	Lost, 26–55
June 3	Glendale Raptors	Home	Lost, 10–41
June 9	San Diego Legion	Home	Lost, 22–39
June 16	Utah Warriors	Away	Won, 46–43

== 2019 season ==
=== Exhibitions ===
Date	Opponent	Home/Away	Result
December 8, 2018	USA South Panthers	Home	Won, 45–10
December 15, 2018	Stars Rugby	Home	Won, 113–0
January 5, 2019	Midwest Selects	Home	Won, 74–0
January 12, 2019	Dallas Reds	Home	Won, 72–0

=== Regular season ===
Date	Opponent	Home/Away	Result
January 26	Toronto Arrows	Home	Won, 36-31
February 2	Glendale Raptors	Home	Won, 40-31
February 10	Seattle Seawolves	Home	Won, 41-31
February 16	Rugby United New York	Home	Lost, 24–27
March 2	Utah Warriors	Away	Won, 21-19
March 16	Houston SaberCats	Away	Won, 49-11
March 23	Austin Elite	Home	Won, 35–31
March 30	Glendale Raptors	Away	Lost, 33-34
April 7	Toronto Arrows	Away	Won, 35-31
April 13	Utah Warriors	Home	Won, 28-19
April 21	Seattle Seawolves	Away	Lost, 24–25
May 4	Austin Elite	Away	Won, 26-14
May 11	San Diego Legion	Home	Lost, 19–26
May 18	Houston SaberCats	Home	Lost, 20–27
May 26	Rugby United New York	Away	Lost, 22-24
June 2	San Diego Legion	Away	Lost, 10-22

== 2020 season ==
On March 12, 2020, MLR announced the season would go on hiatus immediately for 30 days due to fears surrounding the COVID-19 pandemic. One week later (March 19), MLR announced that it had canceled the rest of the 2020 season.

=== Regular season ===
Date	Opponent	Home/Away	Result
February 8	Old Glory DC	Home	Won, 46–13
February 16	Rugby ATL	Home	Lost, 10–22
February 22	Colorado Raptors	Away	Won, 27–20
February 29	San Diego Legion	Home	Lost, 21–25
March 7	New England Free Jacks	Home	Won, 31–22
March 13	Utah Warriors	Away	Postponed, later canceled
March 28	Toronto Arrows	Home	Canceled
April 5	Rugby ATL	Away	Canceled
April 11	Old Glory DC	Away	Canceled
April 18	Rugby United New York	Home	Canceled
April 25	New England Free Jacks	Away	Canceled
May 3	Toronto Arrows	Away	Canceled
May 9	Houston SaberCats	Home	Canceled
May 17	Seattle Seawolves	Away	Canceled
May 23	Austin Gilgronis	Home	Canceled
May 30	Rugby United New York	Away	Canceled

== 2021 season ==
=== Regular season ===
Date	Opponent	Home/Away	Result
March 21	Old Glory DC	Home	Draw, 26–26
March 27	Rugby United New York	Home	Won, 51–28
April 10	Austin Gilgronis	Home	Lost, 15–18
April 17	New England Free Jacks	Home	Won 30-29
April 24	Rugby ATL	Away	Lost, 28-38
May 2	Toronto Arrows	Home	Won, 22-14
May 8	Houston SaberCats	Away	Won, 28-26
May 15	San Diego Legion	Away	Lost, 17-43
May 22	Utah Warriors	Home	Won, 29-24
June 5	Rugby ATL	Home	Lost, 7-8
June 12	Old Glory DC	Away	Won, 25-21
June 20	Toronto Arrows	Away	Won, 18-12
June 27	New England Free Jacks	Away	Won, 17-9
July 4	LA Giltinis	Away	Won, 21-20
July 11	Seattle Seawolves	Away	Lost, 6-30
July 17	Rugby United New York	Away	Won, 35-32

== 2022 season ==
=== Regular season ===
Date	Opponent	Home/Away	Result
February 5	New England Free Jacks	Home	Lost, 13-24
February 12	Rugby ATL	Home	Lost, 9-14
February 19	Toronto Arrows	Home	Lost, 23-24
March 4	Seattle Seawolves	Away	Won, 25-24
March 12	Dallas Jackals	Away	Won, 32-26
March 19	Rugby New York	Home	Lost, 19-30
March 26	Old Glory DC	Away	Won, 31-22
April 2	New England Free Jacks	Away	Lost, 29-33
April 9	Rugby ATL	Home	Lost, 17-34
April 16	Toronto Arrows	Away	Lost, 36-53
April 23	Austin Gilgronis	Home	Lost, 10-32
May 1	Rugby United NY	Away	Lost, 28-36
May 14	Old Glory DC	Home	Won, 50-21
May 21	San Diego Legion	Home	Lost, 12-42
May 29	New England Free Jacks	Away	Lost, 5-57
June 3	Rugby ATL	Away	Lost, 19-45

== 2023 season ==
=== Regular season ===
Date	Opponent	Home/Away	Location	Result
February 17	New England Free Jacks	Home	The Gold Mine	Lost, 36-12
February 25	Houston SaberCats	Away	SaberCats Stadium	Lost, 35-14
March 4	Rugby ATL	Away	Silverbacks Park	Lost, 29-16
March 12	New York Ironworkers	Home	The Gold Mine	Won, 31-5
March 18	Utah Warriors	Home	The Gold Mine	Won, 37-14
March 25	Old Glory DC	Away	Segra Field	Won, 20-17
April 2	Seattle Seawolves	Home	The Gold Mine	Lost, 36-35
April 15	Rugby ATL	Home	The Gold Mine	Lost, 23-7
April 23	Chicago Hounds	Away	SeatGeek Stadium	Won, 37-24
April 30	Toronto Arrows	Home	The Gold Mine	Won, 40-24
May 7	New York Ironworkers	Away	Memorial Field	Lost, 54-19
May 13	San Diego Legion	Home	The Gold Mine	Lost, 26-12
May 21	New England Free Jacks	Away	Veterans Memorial Stadium	Lost, 50-3
June 3	Old Glory DC	Home	The Gold Mine	Lost, 28-15
June 10	Dallas Jackals	Away	Choctaw Stadium	Won, 15-10
June 17	Toronto Arrows	Away	York Lions Stadium	Won, 26-24

== 2024 season ==
NOLA Gold played 16 games in the 2024 regular season, with all eight home games played at the Gold Mine. The team finished the regular season 10–6 and qualified for its first playoff berth, losing to the Chicago Hounds 45-21 in the Eastern Conference semifinal.

=== Regular season ===
Date	Opponent	Home/Away	Location	Result
March 2	Old Glory DC	Home	Gold Mine	Won, 18-6
March 9	Anthem RC	Home	Gold Mine	Won, 34–19
March 16	New England Free Jacks	Away	Veterans Memorial Stadium	Lost, 27–21
March 23	Dallas Jackals	Away	Choctaw Stadium	Won, 35–22
April 4	Chicago Hounds	Home	Gold Mine	Lost, 38–21
April 14	San Diego Legion	Away	Snapdragon Stadium	Lost, 33–20
April 20	Miami Sharks	Home	Gold Mine	Lost, 42–27
April 27	Anthem RC	Away	Truist Point	Won, 40–5
May 11	Seattle Seawolves	Home	Gold Mine	Won, 32–31
May 18	Utah Warriors	Home	Gold Mine	Won, 21–14
May 26	Chicago Hounds	Away	SeatGeek Stadium	Won, 25–13
June 1	Houston SaberCats	Home	Gold Mine	Lost, 21–7
June 9	Miami Sharks	Away	Chase Stadium	Won, 20-13
June 16	RFC Los Angeles	Away	Dignity Health Sports Park	Won, 38-21
June 22	New England Free Jacks	Home	Gold Mine	Won, 27-17
June 29	Old Glory DC	Away	Maryland Soccerplex	Lost, 27–24

=== Postseason ===
Date	Opponent	Home/Away	Location	Result
July 21	Chicago Hounds	Home	Gold Mine	Lost, 45-21
