= Excalibur Rugby =

Excalibur Rugby is the name of the men's rugby union team at Trent University in Peterborough, Ontario. The team's motto is Commitment, Intensity, Desire which is expressed in Latin on the team's crest.

== History ==
Formed in 1966, Excalibur Rugby has been able to maintain a strong tradition of competition and camaraderie. Founded by a small number of rugby enthusiasts, Excalibur Rugby expanded over the years to include both a first and second side, while competing as a varsity rugby team in the OUA and as a social club known as Trent Rugby Football Club (TRFC). Despite its strong history of development and maintenance of a second team composed of up and coming rookies, developing players and rugby fans, Excalibur Rugby made the move to carry only one team for the 2005 season.

== Charitable involvement ==
Over the years the members of Excalibur Rugby have been involved with a number of charitable organizations in and around Peterborough. Players from Excalibur Rugby have worked to support the Peterborough Regional Health Center, the United Way, Kawartha Food Share and other various charities such as the Terry Fox Foundation.

== Tournaments and tours ==
Each November Excalibur Rugby hosts an annual rugby union tournament known as the Bronze Touque tournament. Originally open to any team interested in competing which saw in its inaugural year teams from Ottawa University, Queens Law School and the Cobourg Saxons club team compete with Excalibur Rugby for the coveted trophy. By 2005 the Bronze Touque tournament has developed into a sanctioned OUA off season event with participation by various varsity teams.

Bi-annually members of Excalibur Rugby spend their spring reading break travelling to various schools across North America in a week-long tour. In February 2005 Excalibur Rugby toured the Eastern United States playing Penn State and the University of North Carolina at Chapel Hill.
