= New England Free Jacks =

Professional Rugby Union Team from Boston, Massachusetts

- Founded: 2018
- Location: Quincy, Massachusetts, U.S.
- Ground: Veterans Memorial Stadium (capacity: 5,000)
- CEO: Alex Magleby
- Coach: Ryan Martin
- Captain: Joe Johnston
- Most caps: Joe Johnston (74)
- Top scorer: Jayson Potroz (353)
- Most tries: Paula Balekana (40)
- League: Major League Rugby
- 2026: DNQ; 5th in MLR
Team kit

Official website
- www.freejacks.com

The New England Free Jacks are an American professional rugby union team based in the Greater Boston area that competes in Major League Rugby (MLR). They were announced in September 2018 and began to compete professionally in October 2018. They competed in their first season in MLR in the 2020 season. The team has won three consecutive MLR shields, defeating the San Diego Legion in 2023, the Seattle Seawolves in 2024, and the Houston Sabercats in 2025.

== History ==
=== Early years ===
On September 21, 2018, Major League Rugby announced that Boston would be one of the expansion teams joining the league for the 2020 season. That same day, the Boston club was announced as the New England Free Jacks through social media. The club was co-founded by Alex Magleby and Errik Anderson. Their first match was on October 20, 2018, against the Ontario Arrows at Wanderers Grounds in Halifax, Nova Scotia. Early rosters from these matches included a mixture of veteran professional players from the disbanded PRO Rugby competition and top local talent from clubs such as the Boston Irish Wolfhounds and Mystic River.

Former NFL players Nate Ebner and Patrick Chung, who were teammates on the New England Patriots, are minority owners of the Free Jacks.

Josh Smith was hired as the team's first head coach in 2018. In 2019 the Free Jacks played a season full of exhibitions, going 1–7 in those games. In 2020, during their first official season, they went 1–4 before the remainder of the season was cancelled due to the COVID-19 pandemic. During that year, Mitch Wilson scored the first trie in team history in a game vs New York.

Smith did not come back for the 2021 season and was replaced by Ryan Martin. Martin led the Free Jacks to their first winning season; they finished 10-6 but missed the playoffs. Martin left after that season, and was replaced by Scott Mathie.

Mathie coached the Free Jacks for the next three years and saw nothing but success. He led the team to a 13–3 record in his first year and secured the 1 seed in the Eastern Conference. This led to the Free Jacks' first playoff appearance and first appearance in the Eastern Conference Championship. Their season came to an end here though, losing to Rugby New York 24–16. At the end of the season Mathie was named coach of the year in 2022 and Beaudein Waaka was the first Free Jacks player to be named MLR player of the year.

=== Threepeat ===
The following year, the Free Jacks set a team record, going 14–2 in the 2023 season. This again gave them home field advantage for the Eastern Conference championship. The Free Jacks won their first conference title, beating Old Glory DC 25-7 and leading to their first appearance in the MLR championship. They faced the San Diego Legion at SeatGeek Stadium for the 2023 MLR championship. The game was neck and neck throughout, but Le Roux Malan scored the game winning try in the 76th minute, giving the Free Jacks the 25–24 victory and securing the first MLR championship in team history. Jayson Potroz was subsequently named championship game MVP along with MLR player of the year after leading the league in points. Wian Conradie was named forward of the year, the first player in team history to receive the honor. This capped off a historic season for the Free Jacks.

During the 2023 season, John Poland became the first player in club history to reach his 50th cap.

Mathie led the Free Jacks to another title the following year. As in 2024, they went 11-5 and for the third year in a row received the number one seed in the Eastern Conference. In the first round, the Free Jacks met Old Glory DC 33–29, and then in the Eastern Conference championship beat the Chicago Hounds 23–17 to win their second consecutive conference title. They then headed to Snapdragon Stadium to play the Seattle Seawolves for the 2024 MLR championship, where they won by a 20–11 score, making them the second team in MLR history to win back to back titles. Jed Melvin was named the championship game MVP. Potroz again led the league in points, Reece MacDonald was named back of the year and Wayne van der Bank was the third Free Jacks player in a row to be named MLR player of the year. Mathie was named coach of the year for a second time. This was his final year though, as he left after the 2024, season, taking the job as attacks and backs coach at Edinburgh Rugby.

In 2024, it was announced that former Free Jacks coach Ryan Martin would return as head coach for a second stint.

During the 2025 season the Free Jacks got out to a slow start, starting the year 1–3 overall. However, coach Martin and the team turned things around, and ended the year with a 11–5 record, finishing first overall in the Eastern Conference for the 4th year in a row. They defeatedd the Miami Sharks in the first round of the playoffs, 32–10. They then faced the Chicago Hounds in the conference final, coming back from a 17–0 deficit, with Kyle Ciquera scoring the go ahead try in the 77th minute to win 21–20 to advance to their third consecutive MLR Championship Final. In the 2025 Major League Rugby final, the Free Jacks defeated the Houston SaberCats 28–22, with Brock Webster being named the MVP of the Match. The Free Jacks became the first team in MLR history, and the first pro sports team in North America, to successfully compete a threepeat since 2002. At the end of the season, Paula Balekana was named the MLR Player of the Year, making him the fourth Free Jacks player in a row to receive the award. Coach Ryan Martin would also receive the Coach of the Year Award.

=== Recent activity ===
Following the conclusion of the 2025 MLR season multiple teams folded or ceased operations these included Utah, Miami, Los Angeles, Houston and New Orleans. This left the Free Jacks as one of the six remaining teams alongside Seattle, California, DC, Anthem and Chicago. Only 30 percent of the club’s roster that year was made up of returning players due to the MLR’s new restriction on the number of international players teams could have. As the Free Jacks previously had many players from Canada, Australia and New Zealand.

== Honors ==
=== Championships ===
- MLR Championship shield
  - Champions: 2023, 2024, 2025,
  - Appearances: 2023, 2024, 2025
- MLR Eastern Conference Championship
  - Champions: 2023, 2024, 2025
  - Appearances: 2022, 2023, 2024, 2025

=== Individual awards ===
Major League Rugby Player of the Year

- Beaudein Waaka: 2022
- Jayson Potroz: 2023
- Wayne van der Bank: 2024
- Paula Balekana: 2025

Major League Rugby Forward of the Year

- Wian Conradie: 2023

Major League Rugby Back of the Year

- Reece MacDonald: 2024

Major League Rugby Coach of the Year

- Scott Mathie (2): 2022, 2024
- Ryan Martin: 2025

MLR Championship Game MVP

- Jayson Potroz: 2023
- Jed Melvin: 2024
- Brock Webster: 2025

MLR Points Leader

- Jayson Potroz (2): 2023, 2024

== Sponsorship ==
Season	Kit manufacturer	Shirt sponsor	Other shirt sponsor(s)
2018	Canterbury	None	None
2018–2019	Boathouse	None	None
2020–2021	Paladin Sports	None	None
2022	Paladin Sports	Alloy Therapeutics	None
2023	Paladin Sports	Alloy Therapeutics	Tufts Medical Center, DUDE Wipes, Arbella Insurance, Drayton Distributors
2024	Kappa	Alloy Therapeutics	Tufts Medical Center, DUDE Wipes, Arbella Insurance, Drayton Distributors
2025	Macron	Alloy Therapeutics, Koa Labs	DUDE Wipes, Arbella Insurance, Drayton Distributors

== Roster ==
The New England Free Jacks squad for the 2027 Major League Rugby season is:

2027 New England Free Jacks squad
**Props**: (Tonga) Tevita Sole *; **Hookers**: (United States) Connor Robinson; **Locks**	**Back row**: (United States) Owen Clarke; **Scrum-halves**: (United States) **Oscar Lennon**; **Fly-halves**	**Centres**: (United States) Killian Coghlan; (Canada) **Ben LeSage**; (South Africa) Wayne van der Bank *; **Wings** **Fullbacks**: (United States) **Mitch Wilson**
**(c)** denotes the team captain. **Bold** denotes internationally capped players. * denotes players qualified to play for United States on residency or dual nationality. Source:

=== Head coaches' tenures ===
- (United States) Josh Smith (2018–2020)
- (New Zealand) Ryan Martin (2020–2021)
- (South Africa) Scott Mathie (2021–2024)
- (New Zealand) Ryan Martin (2024–present)

=== Captains ===
- Josh Larsen (2020–2025)
- Mitch Jacobson (2023) (vice-captain 2024)
- Jayson Potroz (2024) (vice-captain)
- Joe Johnston (2025–present)

== Leadership ==
Staff for 2025 Major League Rugby season:

Staff position	Name
Head coach	Ryan Martin
Assistant coach	Dewald Senekal
Assistant coach	Pom Simona
General manager	Tom Kindley

Owners

Position	Name
Co-founder, owner and executive chairman	Alex Magleby
Co-founder, owner and chairman	Errik Anderson
CEO	Ian Frenette
Owner and board member	Angad Banga
Owner and board member	David Barry
Owner and board member	Jonathan Bobbett
Owner	Patrick Chung
Owner	Nate Ebner

== Records ==
=== Season standings ===
Season	Conference	Regular season										Postseason						
Season	Conference	Pos	Pld	W	D	L	F	A	+/−	BP	Pts	Pld	W	L	F	A	+/−	Result
2020 (Note: 2020 regular season shortened and playoffs cancelled due to the COVID-19 pandemic.)	Eastern	6th	5	1	0	4	139	158	-19	5	9	-	-	-	-	-	-	Cancelled
2021	Eastern	4th	16	10	0	6	360	332	+28	8	48	-	-	-	-	-	-	Did not qualify
2022	Eastern	1st	16	13	0	3	454	328	+126	8	62	1	0	1	16	24	-8	Lost conference final (RNY)
2023	Eastern	1st	16	14	0	2	556	273	+283	12	68	2	2	0	50	31	+19	Won Major League Rugby final (SD)
2024	Eastern	1st	16	11	0	5	463	344	+88	--	55	2	2	0	43	28	+15	Won Major League Rugby final (SEA)
2025	Eastern	1st	16	11	0	5	425	341	+84	11	55	3	3	0	81	52	+29	Won Major League Rugby final (HOU)
2026	N/A	5th	10	3	0	7	215	290	-75	5	17	-	-	-	-	-	-	Did not qualify
Totals			95	63	0	32	2,612	2,066	+546	49	314	8	7	1	190	135	+55	4 postseason appearances

== Head coaches ==
Coach	Tenure	Years	Record	Pct.	Playoff rec	Conference champions	MLR championships
(United States) Josh Smith	2018-2020	2	1-4	(.200)	0-0	0	0
(New Zealand) Ryan Martin	2020-2021, 2024–present	2	24-19	(.558)	3-0	1	1
(South Africa) Scott Mathie	2021-2024	3	38-10	(.786)	5-1	2	2

== Stadiums ==
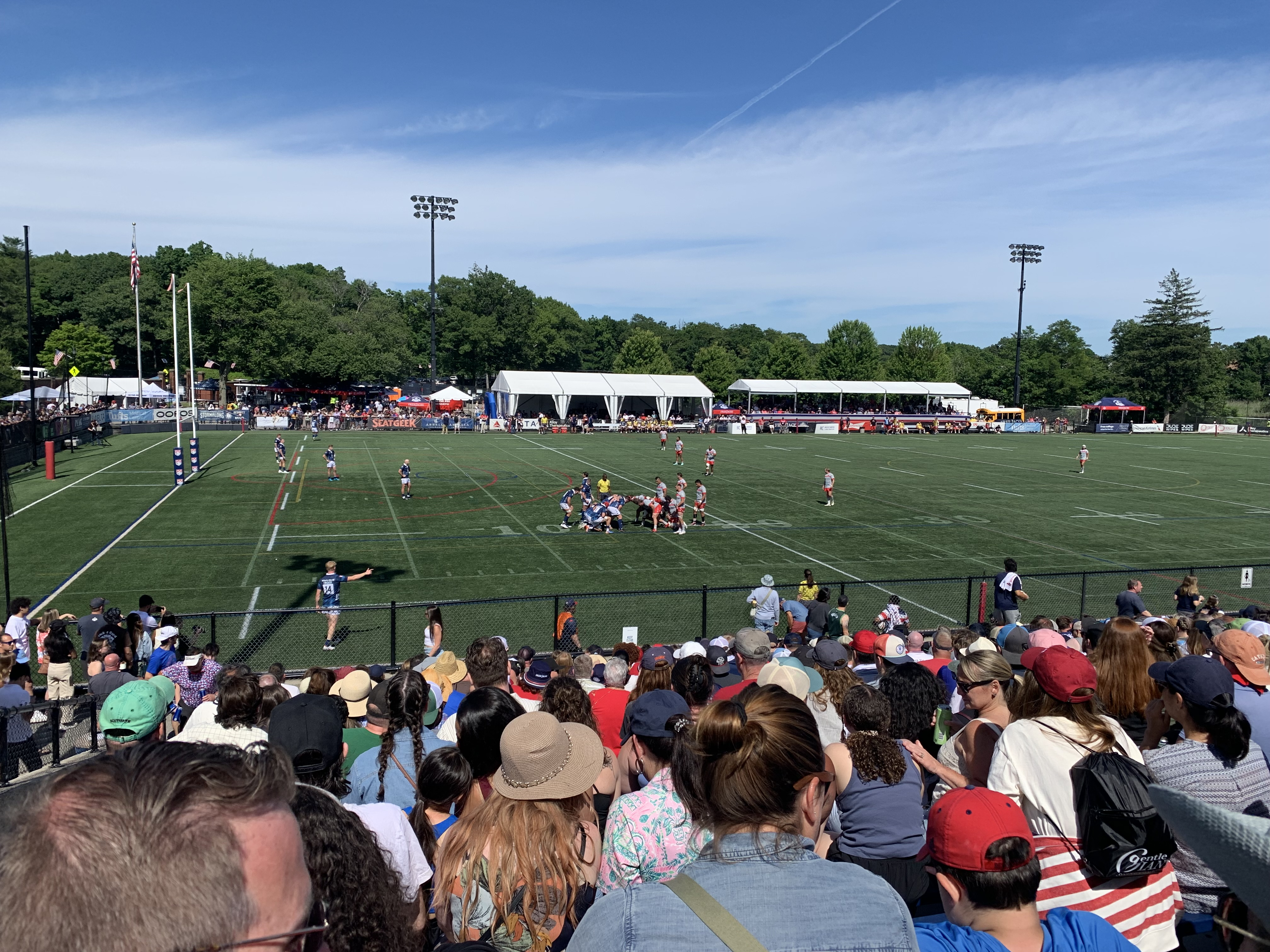
Free Jacks game during the 2024 season

The Free Jacks originally played their home games at the Union Point Sports Complex in Weymouth, Massachusetts. The club played their first two Major League Ruby seasons at the venue, in total they played at stadium from 2019, to 2021.

In June 2021, The Free Jacks partnered with the City of Quincy,Massachusetts and Heritage Sports Ventures, to relocate their home games to the Veterans Memorial Stadium in Quincy. They played their inaugural season at the stadium in 2022. Veterans Memorial has a capacity of 5,000, and has also developed the nickname Fort Quincy since the Free Jacks tenure at the venue. The stadium has hosted the MLR Eastern Conference championship four times, in 2022, 2023, 2024 and 2025. The Free Jacks also hold numerous festivals there throughout the season. Renovations were made to the stadium's left side during the 2025 season, adding a new VIP seating area.

In 2023, the Free Jacks opened a new training facility also located in Quincy, Massachusetts.

== 2019 season ==
All games in the 2019 season were exhibition games and did not count in the league standings; the team played to a record of 1–7, losing their first seven games and winning their final match of the season.

Date	Opponent	Home/away	Location	Result
October 20, 2018	Ontario Arrows	Away	Wanderers Grounds	Lost, 14–40
December 1, 2018	Rugby United New York	Home	Union Point Sports Complex	Lost, 35–38
February 9, 2019	Utah Warriors	Away	Zions Bank Training Center	Lost, 15–70
March 16, 2019	Connacht A	Home	Union Point Sports Complex	Lost, 7–38
March 24, 2019	Ulster A	Home	Union Point Sports Complex	Lost, 15–43
April 6, 2019	Munster A	Home	Irish Cultural Centre GAA Field	Lost, 19–38
April 14, 2019	Leinster A	Home	Harvard Mignone Field	Lost, 12–55
May 18, 2019	Toronto Arrows	Home	Brophy Field at Dartmouth's; Corey Ford Rugby Clubhouse	Postponed
June 1, 2019	Lansdowne F.C.	Home	Irish Cultural Centre GAA Field	Won, 46–29

== 2020 season ==
On March 12, 2020, MLR announced the season would go on hiatus immediately for 30 days due to fears surrounding the COVID-19 pandemic. Seven days later, MLR announced that the season was officially cancelled. The Free Jacks finished the short season 9th in the MLR and 6th in the Eastern Conference.

=== Exhibition ===
Date	Opponent	Home/away	Location	Result
January 18	New England Independents	Home	Union Point Sports Complex	Won, 39–7
January 18	New England Independents	Home	Union Point Sports Complex	Won, 84–21

=== Regular season ===
The team accrued a 1–4 record before the season was halted.

Date	Opponent	Home/away	Location	Result
February 8	Rugby United New York	Home	Sam Boyd Stadium	Won, 34–14
February 15	Utah Warriors	Away	Sam Boyd Stadium	Lost, 33–39
February 23	San Diego Legion	Away	Torero Stadium	Lost, 21–30
February 29	Seattle Seawolves	Away	Starfire Sports	Lost, 29–44
March 7	NOLA Gold	Away	The Gold Mine	Lost, 22–31
March 14	Houston SaberCats	Home	Union Point Sports Complex	Cancelled
March 22	Rugby ATL	Away	Life University Running Eagles Stadium	Cancelled
April 5	Colorado Raptors	Home	Union Point Sports Complex	Cancelled
April 10	Toronto Arrows	Away	TBD	Cancelled
April 18	Old Glory DC	Home	Union Point Sports Complex	Cancelled
April 25	NOLA Gold	Home	Union Point Sports Complex	Cancelled
May 1	Rugby United New York	Away	MCU Park	Cancelled
May 9	Austin Gilgronis	Home	Union Point Sports Complex	Cancelled
May 16	Toronto Arrows	Home	Union Point Sports Complex	Cancelled
May 24	Old Glory DC	Away	Cardinal Stadium	Cancelled
May 30	Rugby ATL	Home	Union Point Sports Complex	Cancelled

== 2021 season ==
The Free Jacks' first game of the 2021 season was played on March 20, facing LA Giltinis in Los Angeles.

Date	Opponent	Home/away	Location	Result
March 20	LA Giltinis	Away	Los Angeles Memorial Coliseum	Lost, 27–42
March 27	Houston SaberCats	Away	Aveva Stadium	Won, 32–0
April 3	Utah Warriors	Home	Union Point Sports Complex	Won, 22–21
April 17	NOLA Gold	Away	Shrine on Airline	Lost, 30–29
April 25	Old Glory DC	Away	Segra Field	Lost, 29–35
May 1	San Diego Legion	Away	Los Angeles Memorial Coliseum	Won, 33–17
May 8	Austin Gilgronis	Home	Union Point Sports Complex	Won, 22–18
May 15	Rugby ATL	Away	Life University	Lost, 18–33
May 23	Rugby United New York	Away	Cochrane Stadium	Lost, 19–29
May 29	Toronto Arrows	Home	Union Point Sports Complex	Won, 14–12
June 6	Old Glory DC	Home	Union Point Sports Complex	Won, 38–34
June 13	Seattle Seawolves	Home	Union Point Sports Complex	Won, 25–21
June 27	NOLA Gold	Home	Union Point Sports Complex	Lost, 9–17
July 3	Rugby United New York	Home	Union Point Sports Complex	Won, 22–6
July 11	Toronto Arrows	Away	Life University	Won, 28–17
July 18	Rugby ATL	Home	Veterans Memorial Stadium	Won, 22–19

== 2022 season ==
=== Regular season ===
Date	Opponent	Home/away	Location	Result
February 5	New Orleans Gold	Away	Gold Mine on Airline	Won, 24–13
February 18	Old Glory DC	Away	Segra Field	Won, 41–25
February 27	LA Giltinis	Away	Los Angeles Memorial Coliseum	Lost, 15–19
March 6	Rugby New York	Away	John F. Kennedy Stadium	Won, 38–29
March 12	Toronto Arrows	Home	Veterans Memorial Stadium	Won, 21–15
March 19	Austin Gilgronis	Away	Bold Stadium	Won, 25–17
March 26	Rugby ATL	Away	Silverbacks Park	Won, 41–27
April 2	New Orleans Gold	Home	Veterans Memorial Stadium	Won, 33–29
April 9	Seattle Seawolves	Home	Veterans Memorial Stadium	Won, 24-22
April 24	Rugby New York	Away	John F. Kennedy Stadium	Won, 29–26
April 30	Utah Warriors	Home	Veterans Memorial Stadium	Won, 33–17
May 7	Old Glory DC	Home	Veterans Memorial Stadium	Won, 26–20
May 13	Rugby ATL	Home	Veterans Memorial Stadium	Won, 15–10
May 19	Toronto Arrows	Away	York Lions Stadium	Lost, 18-33
May 29	New Orleans Gold	Home	Veterans Memorial Stadium	Won, 57-5
June 3	Rugby New York	Home	Veterans Memorial Stadium	Lost, 14–21

=== Postseason ===
Round	Date	Opponent	Home/away	Venue	Result
East Conference Finals	June 19	Rugby New York	Home	Veterans Memorial Stadium	Lost, 16–24

== 2023 season ==
=== Preseason ===
Date	Opponent	Home/away	Location	Result
February 8	Houston SaberCats	Away	SaberCats Stadium	L, 21–34

=== Regular season ===
Date	Opponent	Home/away	Location	Result
February 17	New Orleans Gold	Away	The Gold Mine	W, 36–12
February 26	San Diego Legion	Away	Snapdragon Stadium	L, 12–29
March 11	Old Glory DC	Home	Veterans Memorial Stadium	W, 34–31
March 19	Rugby New York	Away	Memorial Field	W, 33–18
March 25	Dallas Jackals	Home	Veterans Memorial Stadium	W, 10–9
March 31	Utah Warriors	Away	Zions Bank Stadium	L, 24–26
April 8	Chicago Hounds	Home	Veterans Memorial Stadium	W, 31–19
April 15	Toronto Arrows	Away	York Lions Stadium	W, 80–5
April 22	Rugby ATL	Home	Veterans Memorial Stadium	W, 23–13
April 30	Rugby New York	Home	Veterans Memorial Stadium	W, 8–0
May 14	Old Glory DC	Away	Segra Field	W, 42–12
May 21	New Orleans Gold	Home	Veterans Memorial Stadium	W, 50–3
May 27	Toronto Arrows	Home	Veterans Memorial Stadium	W, 57–20
June 2	Rugby ATL	Away	Silverbacks Park	W, 35–14
June 11	Seattle Seawolves	Away	Starfire Stadium	W, 34–26
June 18	Houston SaberCats	Home	Veterans Memorial Stadium	W, 47–24

=== Postseason ===
Round	Date	Opponent	Location	Result
East Conference Finals	July 1, 2023	Old Glory DC	Veterans Memorial Stadium	W, 25–7
MLR Grand Final	July 8, 2023	San Diego Legion	SeatGeek Stadium	W, 25–24

== 2024 season ==
=== Preseason ===
Date	Opponent	Home/away	Location	Result
January 22	Dallas Jackals	Neutral	SaberCats Stadium	L, 22–24

=== Regular season ===
Date	Opponent	Home/away	Location	Result
March 3	Anthem RC	Away	American Legion Memorial Stadium	W, 46–13
March 9	Old Glory DC	Home	Veterans Memorial Stadium	L, 34–35
March 16	New Orleans Gold	Home	Veterans Memorial Stadium	W, 27–21
March 24	Chicago Hounds	Away	SeatGeek Stadium	W, 22–17
April 6	Miami Sharks	Home	Veterans Memorial Stadium	W, 25–3
April 13	Houston SaberCats	Away	SaberCats Stadium	W, 47–35
April 20	Seattle Seawolves	Home	Veterans Memorial Stadium	L, 21–29
April 28	RFC Los Angeles	Away	Dignity Health Sports Park	W, 34–12
May 5	Chicago Hounds	Home	Veterans Memorial Stadium	L, 20–26
May 19	San Diego Legion	Away	Snapdragon Stadium	W, 24–23
May 25	Miami Sharks	Away	Chase Stadium	L, 15–13
June 2	Dallas Jackals	Home	Veterans Memorial Stadium	W, 26–24
June 8	Old Glory DC	Away	Maryland SoccerPlex	W, 31–30
June 16	Utah Warriors	Home	Veterans Memorial Stadium	W, 36–27
June 22	New Orleans Gold	Away	Gold Mine on Airline	L, 17–27
June 29	Anthem RC	Home	Veterans Memorial Stadium	W, 40–7

=== Postseason ===
Round	Date	Opponent	Location	Result
East Conference semifinals	July 20, 2024	Old Glory DC	Veterans Memorial Stadium	Won, 33–29
East Conference final	July 27, 2024	Chicago Hounds	Veterans Memorial Stadium	Won, 23–17
Championship	August 4, 2024	Seattle Seawolves	Snapdragon Stadium	Won, 20–11

== Entertainment ==
=== Mascot ===
On May 7, 2021, the Free Jacks announced a mascot, Woodgy, a furry blue creature with rugby headband tape who wears Free Jacks rugby kit.

=== Post game events ===
Following Free Jacks games the club hosts a variety of post game activities such as autographs sessions with players, beer festivals, live concerts and firework shows.

== Academy ==
=== New England Independents ===
On January 8, 2020, the Free Jacks announced that they would compete in two preseason matches against the New England Independents, a new select team of local All-Star talent representing eight clubs throughout New England. Adam Zilcoski, of the Boston Irish Wolfhounds, was selected as the head coach.

=== Regional academies ===
Club	Region
the Alarm	Boston
Champs	Champlain
Cobblers	North Shore
Granite Hammers	Southern New Hampshire
Lightfoots	Western MA
Mutineers	Rhode Island
Night Watch	Upper CT
Pathfinders	Central MA
Pine Rioters	Southern Vermont & New Hampshire
River Rangers	Upper Valley
the Sea Serpents	Maine Seacoast
Silver Sharks	South Shore
Whistle Punks	New England North

=== Junior Jacks ===
The Junior Jacks are the youth academy level for the Free Jacks.

== Television and radio ==
During the New England Free Jacks earlier years the club would broadcast matches on their official YouTube channel. In 2021, the club signed a deal with NESN to air regional games. In 2022, they began a new partnership with NBC Sports Boston who have since served as the Free Jacks main television outlet.

In February 2026, the Free Jacks announced WMEX 1510 AM / 101.1 FM would serve as the club’s official radio broadcaster providing coverage throughout the greater Boston area.
