= 2025 Major League Rugby season =

Eighth season of Major League Rugby

2025 Major League Rugby Season
- Countries: United States (11 teams)
- Date: February 15, 2025 – June 28, 2025
- Champions: New England Free Jacks (3rd title)
- Runners-up: Houston Sabercats
- Matches played: 94
- Top point scorer: Chris Hilsenbeck (109)
- Top try scorer: Paula Balekana (15)

The 2025 Major League Rugby season was the eighth season of Major League Rugby, the professional rugby union competition sanctioned by USA Rugby. The regular season began on February 15, 2025, and ended on June 28, 2025. Following the shutdown of the Dallas Jackals in September 2024, Major League Rugby featured 11 teams competing in the 2025 season.

The season marked the first of a multiyear media agreement between Major League Rugby and ESPN, with all games streaming on ESPN+ and select games aired nationwide.

For the first time, the MLR Championship Final would be played in Rhode Island at Centreville Bank Stadium.

The New England Free Jacks would go on to capture their third-straight MLR Championship title in beating the Houston SaberCats, 28-22. The club became the first three-time champions in Major League Rugby history, and the first U.S. professional sports team to win three consecutive championships since the Los Angeles Lakers from 2000 to 2002.

== Teams and format ==
The Dallas Jackals ceased to exist after the 2024 season, leaving 11 teams in the 2025 season.

Locations of teams in Major League Rugby
Western Conference Eastern Conference

#	Club	Metro area	Stadium	Capacity	Coach	Captain
WESTERN
WESTERN	Houston SaberCats	Houston, Texas	SaberCats Stadium	4,000	(South Africa) Pote Human	(Australia) Nathan Den Hoedt
WESTERN	Rugby Football Club Los Angeles	Los Angeles, California	Wallis Annenberg Stadium	2,145	(Australia) Stephen Hoiles	(United States) Jason Damm
WESTERN	San Diego Legion	San Diego, California	Torero Stadium	6,000	(Australia) John Manenti	(Australia) Brad Wilkin
WESTERN	Seattle Seawolves	Seattle, Washington	Starfire Stadium	4,500	(Ireland) Allen Clarke	(United States) Riekert Hattingh
WESTERN	Utah Warriors	Salt Lake City, Utah	Zions Bank Stadium	5,000	(New Zealand) Greg Cooper	(Ireland) Gavin Thornbury
EASTERN
EASTERN	Anthem Rugby Carolina	Charlotte, North Carolina	American Legion Memorial Stadium	10,500	(New Zealand) Alama Ieremia	(United States) Jake Turnbull
EASTERN	Chicago Hounds	Chicago, Illinois	SeatGeek Stadium	20,000	(Australia) Chris Latham	(Canada) Lucas Rumball
EASTERN	Miami Sharks	Fort Lauderdale, Florida	AutoNation Sports Field	1,500	(Argentina) José Pellicena	(Argentina) Tomás Cubelli
EASTERN	New England Free Jacks	Boston, Massachusetts	Veterans Memorial Stadium	5,000	(New Zealand) Ryan Martin	(New Zealand) Joe Johnson
EASTERN	New Orleans Gold	New Orleans, Louisiana	Gold Mine	10,000	(New Zealand) Danny Lee	(United States) Moni Tongaʻuiha
EASTERN	Old Glory DC	Washington, D.C.	Maryland SoccerPlex	5,000	(Scotland) Simon Cross	(Scotland) Rob Harley

== Regular season ==
All teams will play eight home games and eight away games followed by a postseason.

Standings updated through 17 June 2025

2025 MLR Eastern Conference
	Club	P	W	D	L	PF	PA	PD	TF	TA	TB	LB	Pts
1	* - New England Free Jacks	16	11	0	5	425	341	+84	61	47	9	2	55
2	c - Chicago Hounds	16	11	0	5	422	353	+69	57	49	7	2	53
3	x - Old Glory DC	16	8	0	8	438	478	-40	63	67	11	2	45
4	x - Miami Sharks	16	8	0	8	380	442	-62	45	66	6	3	41
5	e - New Orleans Gold	16	4	0	12	428	473	-45	60	71	8	8	32
6	e - Anthem Rugby Carolina	16	0	0	16	282	570	-288	42	86	2	3	5
Tiebreakers If teams are level at any stage, tiebreaker criteria are as follows (coin tosses or draw of lots will be used if those below fail): 1. number of matches won 2. the difference between points for and points against 3. the number of tries scored 4. the most points scored 5. the difference between tries for and tries against 6. the fewest red cards received 7. the fewest yellow cards received

2025 MLR Western Conference
	Club	P	W	D	L	PF	PA	PD	TF	TA	TB	LB	Pts
1	z - Utah Warriors	16	11	0	5	529	443	+86	77	59	12	2	58
2	y - Houston SaberCats	16	10	0	6	458	365	+93	63	53	10	4	54
3	x - RFC Los Angeles	16	8	1	7	501	497	+4	76	71	14	3	51
4	x - Seattle Seawolves	16	8	1	7	460	422	+38	67	56	11	4	49
5	e - San Diego Legion	16	8	0	8	490	429	+61	74	60	12	4	48
Tiebreakers If teams are level at any stage, tiebreaker criteria are as follows (coin tosses or draw of lots will be used if those below fail): 1. number of matches won 2. the difference between points for and points against 3. the number of tries scored 4. the most points scored 5. the difference between tries for and tries against 6. the fewest red cards received 7. the fewest yellow cards received

Notes

- * - League Champions
- z – Clinched home field advantage for the entire playoffs
- c – Clinched home field advantage for the conference semi-finals
- y – Clinched conference title
- x – Clinched playoff spot
- e – Eliminated from playoff contention

=== Matches ===
==== Week 1 (February 15–16) ====
February 15	(1 BP) Miami Sharks	29–31	Old Glory DC (1 BP)	Baptist Health Community Field
19:00 EST		Report		Referee: Luke Rogan (USAR) Assistants: Federico Anselmi (UAR) & Tom Ciampa (USAR) TMO: Mike Kelly (USAR)

February 15	(1 BP) New Orleans Gold	35–14	Anthem RC	The Gold Mine
18:00 local		Report		Referee: Marquise Goodwin (USAR) Assistants: Jacob Gonzales (USAR) & Allen Alongi (USAR) TMO: Cam Russell (RC)

February 15	(1 BP) Houston Sabercats	22–25	Chicago Hounds	SaberCats Stadium
19:00 local		Report		Referee: Robin Kaluzniak (RC) Assistants: Kat Roche (USAR) & Jono Cooper (USAR) TMO: Chris Assmus (RC)

February 15	(1 BP) Rugby Football Club Los Angeles	17–24	New England Free Jacks (1 BP)	Wallis Annenberg Stadium
18:00 local		Report		Referee: Derek Summers (USAR) Assistants: Mike Lawrenson (USAR) & Austin Reed (USAR) TMO: Saro Turner (RC) Man of the Match:

February 16	(1 BP) San Diego Legion	40–26	Seattle Seawolves (1 BP)	Torero Stadium
14:00 local PST		Report		Referee: Lex Weiner (USAR) Assistants: Mike Lawrenson (USAR) & Will Nelson (USAR) TMO: Chris Assmus (RC)

Bye/s: Utah Warriors

==== Week 2 (February 21–23) ====
February 21	Anthem Rugby Carolina	5–52	San Diego Legion	American Legion Memorial Stadium

February 23	Chicago Hounds	31–45	Utah Warriors	SeatGeek Stadium

February 23	Miami Sharks	30–25	New Orleans Gold	Baptist Health Community Field

February 23	RFC Los Angeles	28–45	Houston SaberCats	Wallis Annenberg Stadium

Bye/s: New England Free Jacks, Old Glory DC, Seattle Seawolves

==== Week 3 (February 28–March 2) ====
February 28	Anthem Rugby Carolina	31–32	Miami Sharks	Mecklenburg County Sportsplex

March 1	Old Glory DC	10–26	San Diego Legion	Maryland SoccerPlex

March 1	Utah Warriors	55–21	New Orleans Gold	Zions Bank Stadium

March 1	Houston SaberCats	24–21	Seattle Seawolves	SaberCats Stadium

March 2	Chicago Hounds	36–7	New England Free Jacks	SeatGeek Stadium

Bye/s: RFC Los Angeles

==== Week 4 (March 7–8) ====
March 7	Miami Sharks	18–31	Chicago Hounds	Baptist Health Community Field

March 8	Old Glory DC	26–22	Anthem Rugby Carolina	Maryland SoccerPlex

March 8	Utah Warriors	17–37	Houston SaberCats	Zions Bank Stadium

March 8	San Diego Legion	36–28	RFC Los Angeles	Torero Stadium

March 8	Seattle Seawolves	27–24	New England Free Jacks	Starfire Stadium

Bye/s: New Orleans Gold

==== Week 5 (March 15) ====
March 15	Chicago Hounds	30–27	Old Glory DC	SeatGeek Stadium

March 15	New England Free Jacks	35–31	New Orleans Gold	Veterans Memorial Stadium

March 15	Miami Sharks	19–36	Utah Warriors	Baptist Health Community Field

March 15	RFC Los Angeles	35–29	Seattle Seawolves	Wallis Annenberg Stadium

Bye/s: Anthem Rugby Carolina, Houston SaberCats, San Diego Legion

==== Week 6 (March 22) ====
March 22	Old Glory DC	28–14	New England Free Jacks	Maryland SoccerPlex

March 22	Anthem Rugby Carolina	45–46	Houston SaberCats	American Legion Memorial Stadium

March 22	New Orleans Gold	24–31	RFC Los Angeles	The Gold Mine

March 22	Seattle Seawolves	27–30	Utah Warriors	Starfire Stadium

March 22	San Diego Legion	31–12	Miami Sharks	Torero Stadium

Bye/s: Chicago Hounds

==== Week 7 (March 29) ====
March 29	RFC Los Angeles	54–44	Old Glory DC	Wallis Annenberg Stadium

March 29	New Orleans Gold	18–20	Chicago Hounds	The Gold Mine

March 29	Houston SaberCats	34–14	San Diego Legion	SaberCats Stadium

March 29	Utah Warriors	26–33	New England Free Jacks	Zions Bank Stadium

March 29	Seattle Seawolves	25–17	Anthem Rugby Carolina	Starfire Stadium

Bye/s: Miami Sharks

==== Week 8 (April 5–6) ====
April 5	Old Glory DC	29–12	Seattle Seawolves	Maryland SoccerPlex

April 5	Anthem Rugby Carolina	19–33	New Orleans Gold	American Legion Memorial Stadium

April 5	Houston SaberCats	22–24	RFC Los Angeles	SaberCats Stadium

April 5	San Diego Legion	20–27	Chicago Hounds	Torero Stadium

April 6	New England Free Jacks	43–6	Miami Sharks	Veterans Memorial Stadium

Bye/s: Utah Warriors

==== Week 9 (April 12–13) ====
April 12	New England Free Jacks	39–12	San Diego Legion	Veterans Memorial Stadium

April 12	New Orleans Gold	51–29	Old Glory DC	The Gold Mine

April 12	Miami Sharks	31–22	Houston SaberCats	Baptist Health Community Field

April 12	RFC Los Angeles	28–45	Utah Warriors	Wallis Annenberg Stadium

April 13	Chicago Hounds	28–20	Anthem Rugby Carolina	SeatGeek Stadium

Bye/s: Seattle Seawolves

==== Week 10 (April 18–19) ====
April 18	Anthem Rugby Carolina	6–26	New England Free Jacks	American Legion Memorial Stadium

April 18	Seattle Seawolves	28–22	Chicago Hounds	Starfire Stadium

April 19	Old Glory DC	35–37	Miami Sharks	Maryland SoccerPlex

April 19	Houston SaberCats	17–15	New Orleans Gold	SaberCats Stadium

April 19	San Diego Legion	18–31	Utah Warriors	Torero Stadium

Bye/s: RFC Los Angeles

==== Week 11 (April 22–27) ====
April 22	New England Free Jacks	23–21	RFC Los Angeles	Veterans Memorial Stadium

April 23	Anthem Rugby Carolina	19–60	Seattle Seawolves	Mecklenburg County Sportsplex

April 26	RFC Los Angeles	36–38	San Diego Legion	Wallis Annenberg Stadium
		Report 1		Attendance: 2,856

April 26	Houston SaberCats	48–27	Old Glory DC	SaberCats Stadium

April 26	Utah Warriors	41–31	Chicago Hounds	Zions Bank Stadium

April 27	New Orleans Gold	44–36	Seattle Seawolves	The Gold Mine

April 27	Miami Sharks	31–5	Anthem Rugby Carolina	Baptist Health Community Field

==== Week 12 (April 30–May 4) ====
April 30	Utah Warriors	38–31	San Diego Legion	Zions Bank Stadium

May 2	Seattle Seawolves	26–26	RFC Los Angeles	Starfire Stadium

May 4	Old Glory DC	28–12	Utah Warriors	Maryland SoccerPlex

May 4	New England Free Jacks	36–17	Houston SaberCats	Veterans Memorial Stadium

May 4	Chicago Hounds	14–7	Miami Sharks	SeatGeek Stadium

May 4	San Diego Legion	45–36	New Orleans Gold	Torero Stadium

Bye/s: Anthem Rugby Carolina

==== Week 13 (May 9–12) ====
May 9	New Orleans Gold	19–25	Miami Sharks	The Gold Mine

May 10	New England Free Jacks	27–17	Chicago Hounds	Veterans Memorial Stadium

May 10	San Diego Legion	20–37	Houston SaberCats	Torero Stadium

May 10	RFC Los Angeles	45–17	Anthem Rugby Carolina	Wallis Annenberg Stadium

May 12	Utah Warriors	24–28	Seattle Seawolves	Zions Bank Stadium

Bye/s: Old Glory DC

==== Week 14 (May 13–19) ====
May 13	Old Glory DC	27–14	New Orleans Gold	George Mason Stadium

May 16	Miami Sharks	30–19	New England Free Jacks	Baptist Health Community Field

May 17	Houston SaberCats	40–19	Utah Warriors	SaberCats Stadium

May 17	Seattle Seawolves	29–25	San Diego Legion	Starfire Stadium

May 18	Anthem Rugby Carolina	19–41	Old Glory DC	American Legion Memorial Stadium

May 19	Chicago Hounds	24–26	RFC Los Angeles	SeatGeek Stadium

==== Week 15 (May 23–24) ====
May 23	RFC Los Angeles	26–20	Miami Sharks	Wallis Annenberg Stadium

May 23	Seattle Seawolves	14–9	Houston SaberCats	Starfire Stadium

May 24	New England Free Jacks	17–20	Old Glory DC	Veterans Memorial Stadium

May 24	New Orleans Gold	28–31	Utah Warriors	The Gold Mine

May 24	Anthem Rugby Carolina	19–33	Chicago Hounds	American Legion Memorial Stadium

Bye/s: San Diego Legion

==== Week 16 (May 30–June 1) ====
May 30	Miami Sharks	36–32	San Diego Legion	Baptist Health Community Field

May 30	Utah Warriors	31–10	Anthem Rugby Carolina	Zions Bank Stadium

May 31	Old Glory DC	32–43	RFC Los Angeles	Maryland SoccerPlex

May 31	Chicago Hounds	38–17	New Orleans Gold	SeatGeek Stadium
				Attendance: 4,889

June 1	New England Free Jacks	37–30	Seattle Seawolves	Veterans Memorial Stadium

Bye/s: Houston SaberCats

==== Week 17 (June 4–8) ====
June 4	Chicago Hounds	15–12	Houston SaberCats	SeatGeek Stadium

June 7	New Orleans Gold	17–21	New England Free Jacks	The Gold Mine

June 7	Utah Warriors	41–33	RFC Los Angeles	Zions Bank Stadium

June 7	San Diego Legion	50–5	Old Glory DC	Torero Stadium

June 8	Houston SaberCats	26–14	Anthem Rugby Carolina	SaberCats Stadium

June 8	Seattle Seawolves	42–17	Miami Sharks	Starfire Stadium

== Championship Series ==
=== Bracket ===
Conference Semi-Finals
E1	New England Free Jacks	32
E4	Miami Sharks	10
Eastern Conference
E2	Chicago Hounds	27
E3	Old Glory DC	16
W1	Utah Warriors	23
W4	Seattle Seawolves	21
Western Conference
W2	Houston SaberCats	27
W3	RFC Los Angeles	21

Conference Finals
E1	New England Free Jacks	21
E2	Chicago Hounds	20
W1	Utah Warriors	19
W2	Houston SaberCats	33

Championship final
E1	New England Free Jacks	28
W2	Houston SaberCats	22

=== Conference Semi-Finals (June 14–15) ===
June 14, 2025
18:00 CDT

Chicago Hounds	27 – 16	Old Glory DC
Try: Wall 36' c Abel 50' c Péculo 69' c Con: Hilsenbeck (3/3) 37', 51', 70'; Pen: Hilsenbeck (2/2) 29', 59'	Report	Try: Rizzo 40' c Con: Emery (1/1) 41'; Pen: Emery (3/3) 8', 20', 32'; Cards: Gattas 76' yellow

SeatGeek Stadium
Referee: Luke Rogan

June 14, 2025
20:00 MDT

Utah Warriors	23 – 21	Seattle Seawolves
Try: Trainor 10' c, 31' c, Con: Hodgson (2/2) 11', 32'; Pen: Hodgson (1/1) 30'; Leuila (2/2) 54', 65'; Cards: Trainor 46' yellow Jones 70' yellow	Report	Try: Penalty Try 46'; Futi 57' c, 71' c Con: Iona (2/2) 58', 72'

Zions Bank Stadium
Referee: Saba Abulashvili

June 15, 2025
13:00 EDT

New England Free Jacks	32 – 10	Miami Sharks
Try: Balekana 1' m Quattrin 29' c Simon-Peter Toleafoa 48' c Malan 78' c Con: Hollinshead (2/3) 30', 49'; Oscar Lennon (1/1) 78'; Pen: Hollinshead (1/1) 61'; Drop: Hollinshead (1/1) 65'; Cards: von Dadelszen 56' yellow	Report	Try: Myhill 57' c Con: O'Leary (1/1) 58'; Pen: O'Leary (1/2) 9'

Veterans Memorial Stadium
Referee: Robin Kaluzniak

June 16, 2025
18:30 CDT

Houston SaberCats	27 – 21	RFC Los Angeles
Try: McLean 10' m Pita Anae-Ah Sue 18' c, 48' c Max Schumacher 43' m Con: Alatimu (2/4) 19', 49'; Pen: Alatimu (1/1) 66'; Cards: Scott 71' yellow Redelinghuys 76' yellow	Report	Try: Anstee 24' c Reece MacDonald 38' c Ben Houston 76' c Con: Lealiifano (3/3) 25', 39', 77'

SaberCats Stadium
Referee: Lex Weiner

=== Conference Finals (June 21) ===
June 21, 2025
13:00 EDT

New England Free Jacks	21 – 20	Chicago Hounds
Try: Melvin 53' c Nordli-Kelemeti 58' c Ciquera 77' c Con: Hollinshead (2/2) 54', 59'; Auto Conversion 78'	Report	Try: Swiel 11' c Noah Brown 43' c Con: Hilsenbeck (2/2) 12', 44'; Pen: Hilsenbeck (2/4) 18', 61'

Veterans Memorial Stadium
Referee: Federico Anselmi

June 21, 2025
19:00 MDT

Utah Warriors	19 – 33	Houston SaberCats
Try: Lance Williams 17' m Lasike 75' c Tu Vugakoto 81' c Con: Hodgson (2/3) 76', 82'	Report	Try: Basson 3' c Alatimu 30' c Tasi 35' c Drake Davis 54' c Seth Smith 65' m Con: Alatimu (4/4) 4', 31', 36', 55'; Cards: Redelinghuys 80' yellow

Zions Bank Stadium
Referee: Robin Kaluzniak

=== Championship final (June) ===
June 28, 2025
14:00 EDT

New England Free Jacks	28 – 22	Houston SaberCats
Try: Balekana 13' c, 69' m Caird 45' c Con: Hollinshead (3/4) 14', 46', 58'; Pen: Hollinshead (2/2) 7', 18'		Try: Max Schumacher 20' c, 78 m Drake Davis 51' c Con: Alatimu (2/3) 21', 52'; Pen: Alatimu (1/2) 10'

Centreville Bank Stadium
Attendance: 5,702
Referee: Luke Rogan

== Records, milestones, and notable statistics ==
Preseason

- Rugby Football Club Los Angeles played the Fijian Drua in an exhibition match, the first match between teams from MLR and Super Rugby.

Week Two

- Chicago Hounds' hooker Dylan Fawsitt becomes the first player with 100 MLR appearances.

Week Seven

- Anthem Rugby Carolina became the first team to field an all-domestic roster in an MLR game.

Week Nine

- Anthem RC sets the record for longest losing streak in MLR history, with 23 consecutive losses. The previous record of 22 was set by the Dallas Jackals between the 2023 and 2024 seasons.

Week Ten

- Seattle Seawolves' scrum half Juan-Philip Smith becomes the second player with 100 MLR appearances, and the first to do so with one team.

Week Eleven

- Utah Warriors' prop Angus MacLellan becomes the first American-born player, and third overall, to appear in 100 MLR games.
- The Houston Sabercats and New Orleans Gold both record the 50th wins in their franchises' histories.

Week Sixteen

- The Miami Sharks qualify for the MLR playoffs for the first time in franchise history after defeating the San Diego Legion 36-32.

Week Seventeen

- Anthem RC finishes with an 0–16 record for the second consecutive season, becoming the first team in MLR season with multiple winless seasons.
- The Utah Warriors and Chicago Hounds both clinch a home playoff game for the first time in their franchise histories.

Conference Semifinals

- The Utah Warriors win their first postseason game in club history, defeating the Seattle Seawolves 23-21.
- The New England Free Jacks advance to their fourth consecutive Eastern Conference Finals, becoming the first MLR team to play in four conference finals games.
- The Houston SaberCats win their first postseason game in club history, defeating RFC Los Angeles 27-21.

Conference Finals

- The New England Free Jacks win their third-straight Eastern Conference title, becoming the first team to play in three consecutive MLR Championship finals.
- The Free Jacks also set the record for largest postseason comeback in MLR history, overcoming a 17-point deficit to defeat the Chicago Hounds 21-20.
- The Houston SaberCats defeat the Utah Warriors to advance to their first MLR Championship final.

Championship Final

- The New England Free Jacks win their third-straight MLR Championship Final, becoming the first three-time champions in Major League Rugby history, and the first U.S. sports team to win three consecutive championships since the Los Angeles Lakers from 2000 to 2002.

Postseason

- Utah Warriors lock Frank Lochore sets the MLR single-season tackles record with 303, breaking the previous record of 246 set in 2024 by Cory Daniel.
- MLR referee Lex Weiner is appointed by World Rugby to officiate the third-place match between France and Argentina in the 2025 World Rugby U20 Championship, the highest level of competition reached by an American male MLR referee.
- Paula Balekana is named MLR Player of the Year, the fourth-straight year a member of the New England Free Jacks won the award.
- Miami Sharks CEO Milagros Cubelli wins the inaugural MLR Executive of the Year Award

== TV Ratings ==
The final regular season match between Houston and Chicago was broadcast on ESPN2 and drew an average audience of 36,000.

== Player statistics ==
=== Top scorers ===
The top five try and point scorers during the 2024 Major League Rugby season are:

Last updated: June 8, 2025

Most tries
No	Player	Team	Tries
1	(Fiji) Paula Balekana	New England Free Jacks	15
2	(United States) Joe Mano	Utah Warriors	14
3	(Australia) Brad Wilkin	San Diego Legion	11
4	(United States) Shilo Klein	San Diego Legion	10
4	(New Zealand) Liam Coltman	Utah Warriors	10

Most points
No	Player	Team	Pts
1	(United States) Christopher Hilsenbeck	Chicago Hounds	109
2	(Samoa) AJ Alatimu	Houston SaberCats	98
3	(England) Joel Hodgson	Utah Warriors	96
4	(Canada) Shane O'Leary	Miami Sharks	95
5	(Samoa) D'Angelo Leuila	Utah Warriors	93

MLR awards the try scorer 7 points when there is an Automatic Conversion (The ball is touched down between the post in the in-goal area).

== End of Season Awards ==
Award	Player	Team	Position	Ref.
Coach of the Year	(New Zealand) Ryan Martin	New England Free Jacks	—N/a	
Player of the Year	(Fiji) Paula Balekana	New England Free Jacks	Wing	
Rookie of the Year	(United States) Peyton Wall	Chicago Hounds	Centre	
Back of the Year	(Argentina) Gonzalo Bertranou	RFC Los Angeles	Scrum-half	
Forward of the Year	(New Zealand) Frank Lochore	Utah Warriors	Lock	
S. Marcus Calloway Community Impact				
Executive of the Year	(Argentina) Milagros Cubelli	Miami Sharks	—N/a	

=== All-League Teams ===
Major League Rugby announced its First and Second All-MLR Teams in July 2025. The Utah Warriors were the most represented team, with four players in the First Team and three in the Second Team.

Position	First Team	Second Team
Loosehead Prop	(United States) Jack Iscaro (DC)	(Australia) Cameron Orr (SEA)
Hooker	(New Zealand) Liam Coltman (UT)	(United States) Dylan Fawsitt (CHI)
Tighthead Prop	(United States) Pono Davis (HOU)	(United States) Tonga Kofe (UT)
Left Lock	(New Zealand) Frank Lochore (UT)	(England) James Scott (CHI)
Right Lock	(Australia) Nathan Den Hoedt (HOU)	(United States) Jason Damm (LA)
Blindside Flanker	(Uruguay) Manuel Ardao (MIA)	(South Africa) Johan Momsen (HOU)
Openside Flanker	(Australia) Brad Wilkin (SD)	(Australia) Maclean Jones (CHI)
Number-8	(Namibia) Wian Conradie (NE)	(Canada) Lucas Rumball (CHI)
Scrum-Half	(Argentina) Gonzalo Bertranou (LA)	(New Zealand) Zion Going (UT)
Fly-Half	(United States) Chris Hilsenbeck (CHI)	(England) Joel Hodgson (UT)
Inside-Centre	(Fiji) Paula Balekana (NE)	(Argentina) Axel Müller (DC
Outside-Centre	(Australia) Billy Meakes (LA)	(England) Ollie Devoto (CHI)
Left Wing	(Namibia) Divan Rossouw (SEA)	(New Zealand) Tautalatasi Tasi (HOU)
Right Wing	(United States) Joe Mano (UT)	(United States) Noah Brown (CHI)
Fullback	(New Zealand) Jordan Trainor (UT)	(South Africa) Duncan Matthews (SEA)
