= Major League Rugby =

Professional rugby union competition in the United States and Canada

- Current season, competition or edition: 2026 Major League Rugby season
- Sport: Rugby union
- Founded: 2017
- First season: 2018
- Commissioner: Alex Magleby; Graeme Bradbury
- No. of teams: 5
- Countries: United States
- Headquarters: Dallas, Texas, United States
- Confederation: RAN
- Most recent champions: Chicago Hounds (1st title)
- Most titles: New England Free Jacks (3 titles)
- Broadcasters: United States: ESPN (English) VIX (Spanish); International: The Rugby Network
- Website: majorleague.rugby

Major League Rugby (MLR) (Note: Sometimes USMLR or MLRugby is used.) is a professional rugby union competition in the United States. The league comprises five teams. While operating outside of the governance and oversight of the national governing body, the league is officially sanctioned by USA Rugby—a member union of Rugby Americas North (RAN)—and is consequently part of World Rugby.

MLR was founded in 2017 and is headquartered in Dallas, Texas. The league began its first season in 2018 with seven teams. MLR has since expanded, reaching an all-time high of thirteen teams in the 2022 season, including one team in Canada. Twelve teams competed in the 2024 season.

In 2020, Major League Rugby implemented its first collegiate MLR Draft in 2020 and its teams began forming youth academies.

== History ==
=== Founding ===
In September 2016, with at least five amateur rugby union clubs across the United States discussing a possible professional league, Dean Howes, who had previously been an executive with Major League Soccer's Real Salt Lake and the St. Louis Blues of the National Hockey League, stepped in as senior strategic advisor for Rugby Utah in an attempt to provide a pathway for expanding professional rugby stateside.

By February 2017, a total of nine amateur rugby union organizations including the Austin Huns, Dallas Griffins, Glendale Raptors, Houston Strikers, Kansas City Blues, Minneapolis, New Orleans RFC, Rugby Utah and the Seattle Saracens, announced their intentions to form a professional league to begin play the following year.

On August 15, 2017, the Austin Huns announced that it would opt-out of MLR in favor of allowing a newly branded spinoff, the Austin Elite compete in the league. The Houston Strikers rebranded themselves as the Houston SaberCats. Whereas the elite players of New Orleans, Utah, and Seattle became the New Orleans Gold, Utah Warriors, and Seattle Seawolves respectively; interests in Minneapolis were replaced by the San Diego Legion. With Kansas City and Dallas still in planning stages, the league continued as seven members for its inaugural season. The league became the successor to PRO Rugby, a short-lived professional league and Rugby Super League and the USA Rugby Elite Cup, both amateur competitions.

On November 6, 2017, Major League Rugby and CBS Sports Network announced a multi-year television partnership which marked MLR's first major television deal for broadcast rights. It was the first time in American history that a new sporting league had a national television deal prior to launch.

=== Early seasons ===
The first regular-season game in Major League Rugby history was held on April 21, 2018, when the Houston SaberCats hosted the New Orleans Gold. The final was contested between the Seattle Seawolves and the Colorado Raptors, with the Seawolves winning 23–19 to become the inaugural champions.

In addition to Rugby United New York, the Toronto Arrows joined the league ahead of 2019 season as the first Canadian team in MLR. Three further American clubs began play in 2020: the New England Free Jacks, Old Glory DC, and Rugby ATL. With the opening of SaberCats Stadium as Houston's permanent stadium in April 2019, MLR gained its first stadium that was specifically built for league play.

Later in April, RUNY announced the signing of French international Mathieu Bastareaud on a loan deal from Toulon for the 2020 season. In October 2019, another major signing was made when it was announced that All Blacks international and multiple World Cup winner Ma'a Nonu would join the San Diego Legion for the 2020 season. The following December saw another World Cup winner sign with the league, namely South Africa prop Tendai Mtawarira with Old Glory DC.

On March 12, 2020, MLR initially suspended its 2020 season for 30 days due to the coronavirus pandemic, but then cancelled the remainder of the entire season on March 18, after five rounds had been played.

The LA Giltinis began competition in the 2021 season, followed by the Dallas Jackals, who entered in the 2022 season.

At the end of the 2022 regular season, MLR announced that the Giltinis and the Gilgronis—both owned by Adam Gilchrist, co-founder of F45 Training—were disqualified from the playoffs due to a violation of league rules, allegedly including salary cap issues. At the time of their disqualification, the Giltinis and Gilgronis were ranked first and second in the western conference. Gilchrist filed suit against the league and the two teams were expelled from the league in October following a failed attempt to sell both teams.

The Chicago Hounds began competition in the 2023 season. On February 8, 2023, Major League Rugby announced that the Miami Sharks would join the competition for the 2024 season. Following the 2023 season, Rugby ATL relocated from Atlanta to Los Angeles and rebranded as Rugby FC Los Angeles. In November 2023, the Toronto Arrows announced they would cease all operations following the death of founder Bill Webb and a failure to secure new investors. A week later, the New York Ironworkers announced they would also fold. On January 19, 2024, the league announced the creation of Anthem Rugby Carolina for the 2024 season. The team will serve as development team for US-eligible players, based upon the USA Hawks Under-23 men's development side. The team is financially supported by World Rugby, and unlike the other teams, its primary purpose will be to develop US-eligible players, in order to help qualify for the 2027 Rugby World Cup, and improve the USA Eagles as a competitive entity, before the USA-hosted 2031 Rugby World Cup.

In advance of the 2025 season, several trial rules were announced, all designed to reduce the number of scrums in matches, in order to speed up the game. The move drew criticism from fans and commentators, with some remarking that the changes would hinder the development of the sport and international competitiveness.

In July 2025, it was announced that San Diego Legion and RFC Los Angeles had agreed to unite to create the California Legion, and in the following months NOLA Gold, Miami Sharks, Houston SaberCats and Utah Warriors announced they would not be taking part in the 2026 campaign, reducing the total number of teams to six.

Despite the financial headwinds league commissioner Nic Benson, team executives, and owners were confident that the league would continue to function with a strong core of teams.

In December 2025, the league announced that CEO Benson would step down. League leadership would be reorganized, with two co-presidents: Alex Magleby and Graeme Bradbury. Prior to their selection as co-presidents, Magleby was Co-Founder and CEO of the Free Jacks and Bradbury was COO of Major League Rugby.

== Competition format ==
Major League Rugby spans five months from late February through to early July. The 2019 regular season was a double round-robin with all clubs playing each other home and away. Each team played sixteen games, half of them at home. This was followed by a postseason for the top four teams consisting of two semi-final matches and the Championship Game to determine the season's MLR champion team.

Since the 2020 season, MLR used a conference format. Both conferences, the Western Conference and the Eastern Conference, consisted of six teams (seven teams took part in the 2022 Western Conference). Each team plays a double round-robin within their conference, home and away, in addition to playing six games against teams from the other conference, for a total of 16 regular-season games.

The postseason consists of the top three teams from each conference: a wildcard game between the second and third ranked teams, followed by a playoff game between the wildcard winner and the first ranked team in the conference. The resulting playoff winners from each conference then face off in the championship final.

The league is structured as a closed system and, similar to other American sports leagues, does not have promotion and relegation. It operates as a single entity similar to Major League Soccer, with each team or "franchise" owned by the league and the franchise operators owning a share of the league.

== Teams ==
=== Map ===
Locations of Major League Rugby teams

=== Current teams ===
The Seattle Seawolves are the lone remaining team that have been a part of Major League Rugby since its founding in 2018. The New England Free Jacks and Old Glory DC joined in 2020; and the Chicago Hounds joined in 2023. The 2024 season included the relocated club Rugby FC Los Angeles, who had previously been Rugby ATL based in Atlanta. Rugby FC Los Angeles has since merged with San Diego Legion, who were a founding team, to form California Legion.

Overview of Major League Rugby teams
Club	Location	Stadium	Capacity	Joined	Coach	Broadcasters
California Legion	Southern California	Multiple venues		2026	(Australia) Stephen Hoiles	none
Chicago Hounds	Bridgeview, Illinois	SeatGeek Stadium	20,000	2023	(Australia) Chris Latham	WFLD+
New England Free Jacks	Quincy, Massachusetts	Veterans Memorial Stadium	5,000	2020	(New Zealand) Ryan Martin	NBC Sports Boston
Old Glory DC	Fairfax, Virginia	George Mason Stadium	5,000	2020	(Argentina) Augustin Cavalieri	Univision DC; Monumental Sports Network
Seattle Seawolves	Tukwila, Washington	Starfire Stadium (Note: Starfire Stadium is in the Seattle suburb of Tukwila, Washington.)	4,500	2018	(Ireland) Allen Clark	Univision Seattle; Root Sports Northwest

=== Future teams ===
The expansion franchise fee is US$4 million as of 2019.

In November 2026, Major League Rugby announced that it had signed a letter of intent to a prospective ownership group from Buffalo, New York seeking to join the MLR for the 2028 season.

=== Former teams ===
Team	Location	Stadium	Joined	Left
Colorado Raptors	Glendale, Colorado	Infinity Park	2018	2020
LA Giltinis	Los Angeles, California	Los Angeles Memorial Coliseum	2021	2022
Austin Gilgronis	Austin, Texas	Bold Stadium	2018	2022
Toronto Arrows	Toronto, Ontario	York Lions Stadium	2019	2023
Rugby New York	New York, New York	Mount Vernon Memorial Field	2019	2023
Dallas Jackals	Dallas, Texas	Choctaw Stadium	2022	2024
New Orleans Gold	Metairie, Louisiana	Gold Mine on Airline	2018	2025
San Diego Legion	San Diego, California	Torero Stadium	2018	2025
RFC Los Angeles	Los Angeles, California	Wallis Annenberg Stadium	2020	2025
Miami Sharks	Fort Lauderdale, Florida	Chase Stadium	2024	2025
Houston SaberCats	Houston, Texas	SaberCats Stadium	2018	2025
Utah Warriors	Herriman, Utah	Zions Bank Stadium	2018	2025
Anthem RC	Charlotte, North Carolina	American Legion Memorial Stadium	2024	2026

On April 9, 2020, the Colorado Raptors announced that they would withdraw from Major League Rugby after three seasons in the league, effective May 2, 2020, the first team to do so. Their announcement explained their withdrawal by saying that "our greater responsibility lies in the development of American players who can win the World Cup for the United States." Asked to explain how withdrawing from the league would help to develop American rugby players, the Raptors referred the question to Glendale City Manager Linda Cassaday, who said on April 10, 2020, that MLR had been founded with a core mission of developing American rugby players and originally had limited teams to three foreign players, although this expanded to five players before the first season began in 2018. MLR had expanded from seven teams in 2018 to 12 in 2020 without having enough American players to fill out rosters and had raised the ceiling on foreign players to 10 per team. The Raptors believed that both this overall number of foreign players and the higher proportion of foreign to American players no longer best served the goal of developing American players who could compete successfully in the Rugby World Cup, and therefore chose to withdraw from the league to better focus their efforts on the development of American players who could compete on an international stage.

On October 25, 2022, Major League Rugby announced that 12 teams would compete in the 2023 season, but that neither the Austin Gilgronis, nor the LA Giltinis will participate. With the uncertainties surrounding Austin and Los Angeles' team ownership, it was determined to suspend operations of the two teams to ensure a successful 2023 season, and protect the long-term strength and continued growth of the league.

On November 27, 2023, Major League Rugby announced that the Toronto Arrows would cease all operations, and not compete in the 2024 season. The Arrows had sought new funding following the death of their CEO, Bill Webb, but were unable to guarantee the new backers in time.

In December 2023, Major League Rugby announced that the New York Ironworkers were withdrawing ahead of the 2024 season.

In September 2024 the Dallas Jackals, who joined the league in 2022, informed the league that they will not participate in the 2025 competition.

In July 2025, it was announced that San Diego Legion and RFCLA would be forming a new franchise for California and that the two teams would no longer compete individually.

On July 30, 2025, New Orleans Gold announced they would be suspending operations for the 2026 season.

On August 6, 2025, Miami Sharks announced they would not be taking part in the 2026 campaign.

On September 11, 2025, Houston SaberCats announced they would not be taking part in the 2026 campaign.

On November 4, 2025, Utah Warriors announced they would not be taking part in the 2026 campaign and would be suspending operations.

On July 21, 2026, Anthem RC's three-year funding agreement with World Rugby expired which forced the team to disband.

== Champions ==
=== By year ===
Year	Teams	Champion	Score	Runner-up	Venue	Metro area	Attendance
2018	7	Seattle Seawolves	23–19	Glendale Raptors	Torero Stadium	San Diego	2,901
2019	9	Seattle Seawolves	26–23	San Diego Legion	Torero Stadium	San Diego	6,000
2020	12	Canceled due to the COVID-19 pandemic					
2021	12	LA Giltinis	31–17	Rugby ATL	Los Angeles Memorial Coliseum	Los Angeles	7,389
2022	13	Rugby New York	30–15	Seattle Seawolves	Red Bull Arena	New York	1,979
2023	12	New England Free Jacks	25–24	San Diego Legion	SeatGeek Stadium	Chicago	10,103
2024	12	New England Free Jacks	20–11	Seattle Seawolves	Snapdragon Stadium	San Diego	12,085
2025	11	New England Free Jacks	28–22	Houston SaberCats	Centreville Bank Stadium	Providence	5,702
2026	6	Chicago Hounds	35–17	California Legion	SeatGeek Stadium	Chicago	est. 4,400

=== By team ===
Club	MLR Shields	Year(s) Won	Conf champs	Year(s) Won	Playoff apps	Year(s)	Total seasons
New England Free Jacks	3	2023, 2024, 2025	3	2023, 2024, 2025	4	2022, 2023, 2024, 2025	6
Seattle Seawolves	2	2018, 2019	2	2022, 2024	6	2018, 2019, 2022, 2023, 2024, 2025	8
Chicago Hounds	1	2026	0	—	3	2024, 2025, 2026	4
Rugby New York†	1	2022	1	2022	4	2019, 2021, 2022, 2023	5
LA Giltinis†	1	2021	1	2021	1	2021	2
San Diego Legion†	0	—	1	2023	5	2018, 2019, 2022, 2023, 2024	8
Houston SaberCats†	0	—	1	2025	4	2022, 2023, 2024, 2025	8
Rugby FC Los Angeles†	0	—	1	2021	3	2021, 2022, 2025	6
Utah Warriors	0	—	0	—	3	2018, 2021, 2025	8
Old Glory DC	0	—	0	—	3	2023, 2024, 2025	5
Toronto Arrows†	0	—	0	—	1	2019	5
Colorado Raptors (Note: Competed as Glendale Raptors in 2018 and 2019.)†	0	—	0	—	1	2018	3
NOLA Gold†	0	—	0	—	1	2024	8
Dallas Jackals†	0	—	0	—	1	2024	3
Miami Sharks†	0	—	0	—	1	2025	2
Austin Gilgronis (Note: Competed as Austin Elite in 2018 and 2019.)†	0	—	0	—	0	—	5
Anthem RC†	0	—	0	—	0	—	2

† Franchise no longer competes in MLR

== MLR rivalry cups ==
In Major League Rugby, several teams annually compete for secondary rivalry cups. Most cups are deliberately conceived as local derbies between teams in the same region.

=== Summary ===
Each win is counted as an official title. Only official MLR games are considered as official rivalry games unless an exhibition game is specifically marked as a Rivalry game. Several teams now participating in cups played matches before the creation of the cups.

==== Active ====
Rivalry name	Most wins	Titles	Other club(s)	Titles	Recent winner
Coffee Cup	New England Free Jacks	2	Seattle Seawolves	1	New England Free Jacks
Freedom Cup	New England Free Jacks	8	Old Glory DC	5	Old Glory DC

==== Inactive ====
These Cups are currently listed as inactive, due to teams withdrawing from, or relocating within, Major League Rugby. Individual cups may return with new teams in the future.

	Most wins	Titles	Other club(s)	Titles	Last winner
Texas Cup	Austin Gilgronis	3	Houston SaberCats	0	Austin Gilgronis
Lone Star Champs	Austin Gilgronis	1	Houston SaberCats; Dallas Jackals	0; 0	Austin Gilgronis
Cali Cup (original)	LA Giltinis	2	San Diego Legion	1	San Diego Legion
Champagne Cup	Rugby New York	1	LA Giltinis	1	LA Giltinis
Cuisine Solutions Cup	Old Glory DC	2	Austin Gilgronis	1	Austin Gilgronis
Gillys Cup	LA Giltinis	3	Austin Gilgronis	1	LA Giltinis
Fire and Ice Cup	Rugby ATL	3	Toronto Arrows	0	Rugby ATL
Chowdah Cup	New England Free Jacks	5	Rugby New York	1	New England Free Jacks
I-45 Feud	Houston Sabercats	6	Dallas Jackals	1	Dallas Jackals (2024 Western Conference Semi-Finals)
Dog Bowl	Chicago Hounds	2	Dallas Jackals	1	Dallas Jackals
Hargest Bowl	San Diego Legion	6	Dallas Jackals	0	San Diego Legion
Cali Cup	San Diego Legion	2	RFC Los Angeles	0	San Diego Legion

== Players ==
Major League Rugby players include those drawn from North American clubs, as well as foreign signings. Although the original concept was to limit club to three foreign players, the limit grew to five before the start of the first season, before then being increased to ten. This increased allotment of foreign players led to some criticism that MLR was not providing enough opportunities for American players to develop.

=== Awards ===
MLR season

	Player of the Year	Forward of the Year	Back of the Year	Coach of the Year	Rookie of the Year	S. Marcus Calloway Community Impact Award
2019	Brad Tucker; Seattle Seawolves	Paddy Ryan; San Diego Legion	JP Du Plessis; San Diego Legion	Rob Hoadley; San Diego Legion	Not Awarded	Not Awarded
2021	Mike Te'o; Utah Warriors	Johan Momsen; Rugby ATL	Bill Meakes; LA Giltinis	Shawn Pittman; Utah Warriors	Andrew Guerra; NOLA Gold	Not Awarded
2022	Beaudein Waaka; New England Free Jacks	Brendon O'Connor; Rugby New York	Bill Meakes; LA Giltinis	Scott Mathie; New England Free Jacks	Tavite Lopeti; Seattle Seawolves	Andrew Quattrin; Toronto Arrows
2023	Jayson Potroz; New England Free Jacks	Wian Conradie; New England Free Jacks	Nate Augspurger; San Diego Legion	Josh Syms; Old Glory DC	Sam Golla; Dallas Jackals	Daniel Kriel; Seattle Seawolves
2024	Wayne van der Bank; New England Free Jacks	Jero Gomez Vara; Dallas Jackals	Reece MacDonald; New England Free Jacks	Scott Mathie; New England Free Jacks	Junior Gafa; Anthem RFC	Ben LeSage; New England Free Jacks
2025	Paula Balekana; New England Free Jacks	Frank Lochore; Utah Warriors	Gonzalo Bertranou; Rugby Football Club Los Angeles	Ryan Martin New England Free Jacks	Peyton Wall; Chicago Hounds	—N/a

MLR championship

	MVP of the Championship Match
2018	Vili Toluta'u; Seattle Seawolves
2019	JP Smith; Seattle Seawolves; Apisai Naikatini (MVP of Championship Series); Seattle Seawolves
2021	Matt Giteau; LA Giltinis
2022	Andy Ellis; Rugby New York
2023	Jayson Potroz; New England Free Jacks
2024	Jed Melvin; New England Free Jacks
2025	Brock Webster; New England Free Jacks
2026	Lucas Rumball; Chicago Hounds

=== Player of the Year ===
Major League Rugby Player of the Year
- Awarded for: The most outstanding player in Major League Rugby
- Country: United States

History
- First award: 2019
- Most recent: Brock Webster (Chicago Hounds)

The Major League Rugby Player of the Year is an annual award given to the Major League Rugby's most valuable player.

The award was first given out during the 2019 sporting event. The award has been given out every year since besides the 2020 season due to the COVID-19 pandemic.

==== Winners ====
Season	Player	Team	Position	Reference
2019	Brad Tucker	Seattle Seawolves	Lock	
2021	Mike Te'o	Utah Warriors	Wing	
2022	Beaudein Waaka	New England Free Jacks	Fly Half	
2023	Jayson Potroz	New England Free Jacks	Fly Half	
2024	Wayne van der Bank	New England Free Jacks	Centre	
2025	Paula Balekana	New England Free Jacks	Wing	
2026	Brock Webster	Chicago Hounds	Fullback	

==== Winners by team ====
Team	Winners	Years
New England Free Jacks	4	2022, 2023, 2024, 2025
Seattle Seawolves	1	2019
Utah Warriors	1	2021
Chicago Hounds	1	2026

== Television coverage ==
As of 2025, ESPN2 broadcasts select matches nationally; all other matches are available to stream live on ESPN+.

ESPN had the national and international rights to an 18-game package covering regular season matches to audiences across its various platforms for the 2018 season. The CBS Sports Network televised select matches nationally during the 2019 season. This included a Game of the Week during each of the 10 rounds of the MLR regular season along with all three post-season matches. Dan Power (Play By Play), Brian Hightower (Color Analyst) and Stacy Paetz (Sideline) were the CBS Sports commentators for the 2019 season. The remaining games were available on ESPN properties and regional sports networks. AT&T Sports Networks had a 17-game package covering six of the seven MLR teams for games not broadcast on the CBS Sports Network. Home-and-away matches for Austin, Houston and New Orleans were carried on AT&T SportsNet Southwest. Seattle's matches were carried on Root Sports Northwest and all Colorado and Utah games were hosted on AT&T SportsNet Rocky Mountain.

The 2019 Championship game was broadcast on CBS, the first MLR game to be televised on free-to-air TV. It gained a 0.32 Sports TV rating which equated to 510,000 two-plus-person households.

Due to the COVID-19 pandemic, MLR adjusted its 2020 season schedule and turned its attention to ensuring the league would rebound with a strong showing in 2021. Matches were televised on CBS Sports Network and Fox Sports 2, among other national and local market platforms. The MLR Championship was broadcast on CBS on Sunday, August 1, 2021.

For the 5th (2022), 6th (2023) and 7th (2024) seasons of MLR competition, Fox Sports nationally broadcast select matches on FS1 and FS2. Fox broadcast the 2022 Final between New York and Seattle, with an average audience figure of 281,000. During the 2023 season, Fox Sports 1 broadcast three regular season matches, with average audience figures ranging between 53,000 and 147,000. Fox Sports 2 broadcast one regular season match with an average audience of 36,000.

In May 2025 the first MLR game broadcast on ESPN2 drew 26,000 viewers with another match in June drawing 36,000. The Eastern and Western conference finals drew 49,000 and 32,000 viewers, respectively. The 2025 MLR Final only garnered 75,000 viewers on ESPN2 and ESPN Deportes.

Several teams have or had separate local rights agreements.

- San Diego Legion has a separate local rights agreement for their market with all the Legion's home-and-away MLR games that are not nationally televised being televised locally on Channel 4 YurView California.
- The Chicago Hounds began a television partnership with Marquee Sports Network beginning with the 2023 season.
- Rugby United New York (RUNY) announced a regional television partnership with SNY to televise nine games of RUNY's inaugural season (2019), including live coverage of with the premiere game. NBC Sports Washington and NBC Sports Philadelphia+ joined SNY in televising match coverage of eight remaining games.
- The New England Free Jacks have had a television partnership with NBC Sports Boston since the 2022 season.
- Toronto Arrows Rugby announced a television partnership with GameTV for the 2019 season. Between 2020 and 2023, Toronto Arrows games were available in Canada on TSN.
- Austin Elite Rugby partnered with Facebook Watch for their Texas-based viewers during the 2019 season.

MLR Weekly presented by Rugby Wrap Up is a weekly Major League Rugby magazine show featuring weekly highlights, previews and interviews with players, coaches and rugby personalities. The show is broadcast on American TV including Cox Communication's YurView Channel 4 in San Diego and Santa Barbara, and Channel 118 in Orange County and Palos Verdes, YurView California. YurView Arizona, YurView Vegas as well as Marquee Sports Network in Chicago.

=== Finals TV ratings ===
Year	TV Viewership	Ratings	Channel	Venue	Metro area	Stadium Attendance	Ref.
2018			CBSSN	Torero Stadium	San Diego	2,901	
2019	510,000	0.32	CBS	Torero Stadium	San Diego	6,000	
2020	Cancelled due to COVID-19 pandemic						
2021	478,000	0.28	CBS	Los Angeles Memorial Coliseum	Los Angeles	7,389	
2022	281,000	0.16	Fox	Red Bull Arena	New York	1,979	
2023	269,000	0.2	Fox	SeatGeek Stadium	Chicago	10,103	
2024	200,000		Fox	Snapdragon Stadium	San Diego	12,085	
2025	78,000		ESPN2; ESPN Deportes	Centreville Bank Stadium	Pawtucket	5,702	

=== Streaming ===
On March 16, 2021, MLR launched The Rugby Network. It is a free streaming platform in conjunction with RugbyPass which streams MLR matches and highlights. This digital network provides rugby fans with a single destination to stream select MLR matches, international rugby matches, game highlights, and other content. In 2024 MLR announced that there were over 271,000 subscribers to The Rugby Network with 55% year on year growth.

=== MLR App ===
On March 17, 2021, MLR launched its official mobile app. This allows MLR fans to view MLR news, schedules, match scores, team profiles, statistics, and other video content. The app is part of a multi-platform deal with digital sport innovators PT SportSuite for MLR's digital media capabilities. The MLR app is available to download on iPhone App Store and Android Google Play.

== Attendance ==
Top ten attendances for Major League Rugby matches all time, from 2018 onward:

Rank	Attendance	Game	Date	Season	Venue	Location
1	12,085	New England Free Jacks vs Seattle Seawolves; Championship Final	August 4, 2024	2024	Snapdragon Stadium	San Diego, CA
2	11,423	San Diego Legion vs Utah Warriors; Week 1	February 18, 2023	2023	Snapdragon Stadium	San Diego, CA
3	10,906	Utah Warriors vs Rugby FC Los Angeles; Week 18	June 28, 2024	2024	America First Field	Sandy, UT
4	10,103	San Diego Legion vs New England Free Jacks; Championship Final	July 8, 2023	2023	SeatGeek Stadium	Chicago, IL
5	9,186	Utah Warriors vs Glendale Raptors; Pre-season exhibition	March 30, 2018	2018	Rio Tinto Stadium	Sandy, UT
6	8,926	San Diego Legion vs New York Ironworkers; Week 15	May 28, 2023	2023	Snapdragon Stadium	San Diego, CA
7	7,389	Los Angeles Giltinis vs Rugby ATL; Championship Final	August 1, 2021	2021	Los Angeles Coliseum	Los Angeles, CA
8	6,000	San Diego Legion vs Seattle Seawolves; Championship Final	June 16, 2019	2019	Torero Stadium	San Diego, CA
9	5,702	New England Free Jacks vs Houston SaberCats; Championship Final	June 28, 2025	2025	Centreville Bank Stadium	Pawtucket, RI
10	4,880	Los Angeles Giltinis vs Utah Warriors; Week 9	May 15, 2021	2021	SoFi Stadium	Los Angeles, CA

Attendance for the inaugural season was approximately 1,800 per match. That average increased by about 300 per game in 2019 with an average of 2,133 per game and a total of 159,000 attendees. George Killebrew reported that in 2022 an additional 70,000 tickets were sold compared to the 2021 season, with crowd averages remaining around 2,000 per game. Major League Rugby's Instagram account reported a 13% increase in attendance between the 2023 and 2024 MLR seasons.

== Executives ==
Commissioner/CEO

- Dean Howes (2016–2019)
- George Killebrew (2019–2023)
- Nic Benson (2023–2025)

Position abolished (2025)

Deputy Commissioner

- Nic Benson (2016–2023)

Co-Presidents

- Alex Magleby (2025–present)
- Graeme Bradbury (2025–present)

== Sponsorship ==
The Gem Garden in San Marcos, California, makes all MLR Championship rings, as of 2018.

On October 28, 2019, Major League Rugby announced that, starting for the 2020 season, Paladin Sports will be the new supplier of all uniforms/kit for the league. On November 1, 2023, MLR announced a three-year agreement with Italian sportswear manufacturer, Kappa, to provide match kits, training kits, and fanwear support to all MLR teams, beginning with the 2024 season.

On January 2, 2020, MLR partnered with Rhino Rugby for the 2020 season. Rhino Rugby is the official ball and technical training equipment supplier for the 2020 MLR season. The Rhino Rugby "Vortex Elite" ball is the official MLR match ball for all 12 teams. The Vortex Elite is currently the official ball of Rugby Europe, and Asia Rugby, and has been used in the Penn Mutual Collegiate Rugby Championship (CRC) the past several years.

In March 2021, American Airlines became MLR's official airline and travel partner.

On February 23, 2023, MLR signed a partnership with OVAL3, the brand specializing in Web3 and fantasy rugby. OVAL3 will be the "Exclusive NFT Fantasy Game" of Major League Rugby. OVAL3 plans to provide "world-class immersive experiences" and Web 3.0 engagement to rugby's rapidly-growing North American fanbase.

On October 6, 2023, MLR signed a partnership with Legends to lead sponsorship sales and commercial outreach.

Jersey sponsorships
Team	Sponsor	Manufacturer
Dallas Jackals	None	Kappa
Houston Sabercats	None	Kappa
Chicago Hounds	None	Kappa
New Orleans Gold	Louisiana Office of Tourism	Kappa
Rugby New York	None	Kappa
San Diego Legion	Kings and Convicts Brewing	Kappa
Seattle Seawolves	WaFd Bank	Kappa
Toronto Arrows	Toronto Inner-City Rugby Foundation	Kappa
Utah Warriors	InterMountain Healthcare	Kappa
New England Free Jacks	Alloy Therapeutics	Kappa
Old Glory DC	Cuisine Solutions	Kappa
Rugby ATL	Barbour Orthopedics and Spine	Kappa

== See also ==
- United States Rugby Players Association
- Women's Premier League Rugby — Women's top competition in the U.S.
- PRO Rugby — a professional rugby competition in the U.S. that played only one season in 2016 before folding
- Rugby Super League — predecessor to PRO Rugby and highest level rugby competition in the U.S. from 1997 to 2012
- Super Rugby Americas — professional rugby competition played predominantly in South America, featuring teams from Argentina, Brazil, Chile, Uruguay, Paraguay, and the United States.
- Rugby union in the United States
- History of rugby union in the United States
- College rugby
- North American Rugby League (NARL)
