= 2023 Major League Rugby season =

Sixth season of Major League Rugby

- Countries: United States (11 teams); Canada (1 team)
- Date: February 17 – July 8
- Champions: New England Free Jacks (1st Title)
- Runners-up: San Diego Legion
- Matches played: 101
- Highest attendance: 11,423; San Diego Legion 33–17 Utah Warriors; February 18, 2023
- Tries scored: 729 (average 7.2 per match)

Official website
- majorleague.rugby

The 2023 Major League Rugby season was the sixth season of Major League Rugby, the professional rugby union competition sanctioned by USA Rugby. The regular season began on February 17, 2023.

The Chicago Hounds made their debut this season, while the Austin Gilgronis and LA Giltinis withdrew from the competition. This left a total of 12 teams competing; 6 teams in each conference, with the Chicago Hounds added to the Western Conference.

== Teams and format ==
The 12 teams contested the regular season, with 6 in each of the Eastern and Western Conferences. Each club played two games against each of the other five clubs in their conference (one at home and one away each) and one game against each of the six clubs in the other conference.

Conference rankings at the end of the regular season determined each team's placement in the post season, known as the Championship Series:

- Teams ranked 2nd in their conference hosted the team ranked 3rd, as part of the Eliminators.
- The team in the conference ranked 1st received a bye, and hosted the winner of their conference's Eliminator, to determine the Conference champion.
- Both Conference champions then contested the Championship final, held at SeatGeek Stadium in Chicagoland on July 8, 2023. The winners of the Championship final lifted the MLR Shield and became the 2023 Major League Rugby Champions.
Locations of teams in Major League Rugby
Western Conference Eastern Conference

#	Club	Metro area	Stadium	Capacity	Coach	Captain
WESTERN
WESTERN	Chicago Hounds	Chicago, Illinois	SeatGeek Stadium	20,000	(Australia) Sam Harris	(United States) Bryce Campbell
WESTERN	Dallas Jackals	Dallas, Texas	Choctaw Stadium	48,114	(Argentina) Agustín Cavalieri	(Argentina) JP Aguirre
WESTERN	Houston SaberCats	Houston, Texas	SaberCats Stadium	4,000	(South Africa) Pote Human	(South Africa) Dean Muir
WESTERN	San Diego Legion	San Diego, California	Snapdragon Stadium	35,000	(New Zealand) Danny Lee	(Scotland) Blair Cowan
WESTERN	Seattle Seawolves	Seattle, Washington	Starfire Stadium (Note: Starfire Stadium is in the Seattle suburb of Tukwila, Washington.)	4,500	(Ireland) Allen Clarke	(United States) Riekert Hattingh
WESTERN	Utah Warriors	Salt Lake City, Utah	Zions Bank Stadium	5,000	(New Zealand) Greg Cooper	(United States) Bailey Wilson
EASTERN
EASTERN	New England Free Jacks	Boston, Massachusetts	Veterans Memorial Stadium	5,000	(South Africa) Scott Mathie	(Canada) Josh Larsen
EASTERN	New Orleans Gold	New Orleans, Louisiana	Gold Mine	10,000	(Samoa) Kane Thompson	(United States) Cam Dolan
EASTERN	Old Glory DC	Washington, D.C.	Segra Field	5,000	(New Zealand) Josh Syms	(United States) Jamason Faʻanana-Schultz
EASTERN	Rugby New York	New York, New York	Memorial Stadium (Note: Memorial Stadium is in Mount Vernon, Westchester County, New York.)	4,000	(New Zealand) James Semple	(United States) Nate Brakeley
EASTERN	Rugby ATL	Atlanta, Georgia	Silverbacks Park (Note: Silverbacks Park is in the Atlanta suburb of Doraville, Georgia.)	5,000	(New Zealand) Stephen Brett	(Canada) Matt Heaton
EASTERN	Toronto Arrows	Toronto, Ontario	York Lions Stadium	4,000	(Australia) Peter Smith	(Canada) Lucas Rumball

== Regular season ==
The regular season consisted of 18 weeks, with each team playing 16 matches, beginning on February 17, 2023, and ending on June 18.

=== Standings ===
MLR Eastern Conference
	P	W	D	L	PF	PA	PD	TF	TA	TB	LB	Pts
New England Free Jacks (C)	16	14	0	2	556	273	+283	80	36	11	1	68
Rugby New York	16	8	0	8	428	387	+41	62	52	10	1	43
Old Glory DC (SF)	16	7	1	8	408	443	-35	60	62	11	2	43
New Orleans Gold	16	7	0	9	339	435	-96	46	61	6	1	35
Rugby ATL	16	5	1	10	355	428	-73	48	59	5	1	28
Toronto Arrows	16	1	2	13	306	601	-295	37	88	4	4	16
Tiebreakers If teams are level at any stage, tiebreaker criteria are as follows (coin tosses or draw of lots will be used if those below fail): 1. number of matches won 2. the difference between points for and points against 3. the number of tries scored 4. the most points scored 5. the difference between tries for and tries against 6. the fewest red cards received 7. the fewest yellow cards received
Green background indicates teams in position for the Eastern Conference Finals; Blue background indicates teams in position for the Eastern Conference Semi-Finals; Last Updated: July 9, 2023

MLR Western Conference
	P	W	D	L	PF	PA	PD	TF	TA	TB	LB	Pts
San Diego Legion (RU)	16	15	0	1	554	285	+269	81	41	13	1	74
Seattle Seawolves (SF)	16	12	0	4	509	348	+161	67	48	9	2	59
Houston SaberCats	16	10	0	6	484	413	+71	70	57	11	2	53
Utah Warriors	16	10	0	6	445	421	+24	63	59	8	2	50
Chicago Hounds	16	3	0	13	327	497	-170	43	70	4	4	20
Dallas Jackals	16	2	0	14	278	458	-180	41	64	6	5	19
Tiebreakers If teams are level at any stage, tiebreaker criteria are as follows (coin tosses or draw of lots will be used if those below fail): 1. number of matches won 2. the difference between points for and points against 3. the number of tries scored 4. the most points scored 5. the difference between tries for and tries against 6. the fewest red cards received 7. the fewest yellow cards received
Green background indicates teams in position for the Western Conference Finals; Blue background indicates teams in position for the Western Conference Semi-Finals; Last Updated: June 18, 2023

=== Matches ===
The following are the match results for the 2023 Major League Rugby regular season:

Home \ Away	CHI	DAL	HOU	NE	NO	DC	ATL	NY	SD	SEA	TOR	UTA
Chicago Hounds		24–22	21–38		24–37			20–21	14–36	5–27	26–27	10–14
Dallas Jackals	28–29		12–33		10–15	3–7			38–47	10–35	14–11	26–36
Houston SaberCats	40–33	33–21			35–14	31–7	40–28		31–26	17–34		24–30
NE Free Jacks	31–19	10–9	47–24		50–3	34–31	23–13	8–0			57–20	
New Orleans Gold				12–36		15–28	7–23	31–5	12–26	35–36	40–24	37–14
Old Glory DC	42–27			24–42	17–20		36–28	42–31		19–41	29–3	36–22
Rugby ATL	27–12	19–27		14–35	29–16	35–27		24–39	10–35		17–10	
Rugby NY		43–14	27–34	18–33	54–19	34–8	31–20				39–3	33–43
San Diego Legion	48–24	22–0	29–16	29–12		48–26		36–13		40–19		33–17
Seattle Seawolves	35–13	61–19	24–12	26–34			28–22	25–11	20–23			27–20
Toronto Arrows			26–48	5–80	24–26	29–29	34–34	27–29	17–50	27–36		
Utah Warriors	24–26	33–25	34–28	26–24			28–12		16–26	41–35	47–19	

Updated to match(es) played on June 18, 2023
Colors: Blue: home team win; Yellow: draw; Red: away team win.

=== Scheduled matches ===
==== Week 1 (February 17–19) ====
February 17	Rugby ATL	17–10	Toronto Arrows (1 BP)	Silverbacks Park
19:00 EST	Try: Alex Maughan 13'; Austin White 23'; Rewita Biddle 65'; Con: Kurt Coleman (1/2) 14'; Duncan van Schalkwyk (0/1); Pen: Kurt Coleman (0/1); Cards: Tiaan Eramsus (yellow card) 34'	Report	Try: Mitch Richardson 76'; Con: Sam Malcolm (1/1) 77'; Pen: Sam Malcolm (1/1) 80+1'	Attendance: 1,400; Referee: Scott Green (USAR) Assistants: Dave Edwards (USAR) & Bryan Hall (USAR) TMO: Nick Hannon (USAR) Man of the Match: Rewita Biddle (Rugby ATL)

February 17	New Orleans Gold	12–36	New England Free Jacks (1 BP)	The Gold Mine
20:00 EST	Try: Jarred Adams 16'; Moni Tongaʻuiha 25'; Con: Rodney Iona (1/2) 17'	Report	Try: Mills Sanerivi 3'; Jayson Potroz 13'; John Poland (2) 33', 76'; Mitch Wilson 40+1'; Con: Jayson Potroz (2/2) 4', 40+2'; Automatic conversion (2) 13', 33'; Reece MacDonald (0/1); Pen: Jayson Potroz (0/1); Reece MacDonald (1/1) 74'	Attendance: 1,300; Referee: Cisco Lopez (USAR) Assistants: Allen Alongi (USAR) & Rob Halcomb (USAR) TMO: Amelia Luciano (USAR) Man of the Match: Jayson Potroz (New England Free Jacks)

February 18	(1 BP) Old Glory DC	42–27	Chicago Hounds	Segra Field
14:00 EST	Try: Collin Grosse 1'; Lautaro Bavaro 17'; Nic Souchon 32'; Junior Sa'u 36'; Kurt Baker 43'; Danny Tusitala 58'; Con: Joaquín Díaz Bonilla (3/6) 2', 37', 44'; Pen: Joaquín Díaz Bonilla (2/2) 12', 27'	Report	Try: George Thornton 20'; Charlie Abel 49'; LaRome White 68'; Con: Luke Carty (2/2) 21', 69'; Automatic conversion 49'; Pen: Luke Carty (2/2) 6', 16'; Cards: Luke Beauchamp (yellow card) 32'	Attendance: 1,500; Referee: Federico Anselmi (UAR) Assistants: Craig Sakowski (USAR) & Ian Seaton (USAR) TMO: Nick Hannon (USAR) Man of the Match: Danny Tusitala (Old Glory DC)

February 18	(1 BP) San Diego Legion	33–17	Utah Warriors	Snapdragon Stadium
16:00 PST	Try: Fakaʻosi Pifeleti 15'; Dan Pryor 21'; Nate Augspurger 32'; Christian Poidevin 57'; Con: Josh Henderson (2/4) 16', 58'; Pen: Josh Henderson (2/2) 29', 49'; Will Hooley (1/1) 73'	Report	Try: Joseph Mano 17'; Paul Lasike 53'; Caleb Makene 66'; Con: Joel Hodgson (0/2); Automatic conversion 53'; Cards: Saia Uhila (yellow card) 20'	Attendance: 11,423; Referee: Luke Rogan (USAR) Assistants: Marquise Goodwin (USAR) & Jacob Gonzalez (USAR) TMO: Derek Summers (USAR) Man of the Match:

February 18	Seattle Seawolves	25–11	Rugby New York	Starfire Stadium
18:30 PST	Try: Duncan Matthews 77'; Con: Automatic conversion 77'; Pen: Jordan Chait (6/6) 3', 12', 21', 46', 65', 74'	Report	Try: Ed Fidow 56'; Con: Sam Windsor (0/1); Pen: Sam Windsor (2/2) 14', 40'; Cards: Andrew Coe (yellow card) 64'	Attendance: 4,500; Referee: Chris Assmus (RC) Assistants: Brad Schwalger (RC) & Clint Lemkus (RC) TMO: Derek Summers (USAR) Man of the Match: Jordan Chait (Seattle Seawolves)

February 19	Dallas Jackals	12–33	Houston SaberCats (1 BP)	Choctaw Stadium
19:00 CST	Try: Jerónimo Gómez Vara 65'; Adriaan Booysen 76'; Con: Adriaan Carelse (1/2) 77'	Report	Try: Louritz van der Schyff 8'; Hanco Germishuys 29'; Davey Coetzer 37'; Carlo de Nysschen 45'; Christian Dyer 72'; Con: Davey Coetzer (3/4) 30', 46', 73'; Automatic conversion 37'	Attendance: 1,500; Referee: Moe Chaudhry (RC) Assistants: Andrew Low (USAR) & Justin Hale (USAR) TMO: Derek Summers (USAR) Man of the Match: Carlo de Nysschen (Houston Sabercats)

==== Week 2 (February 24–26) ====
February 24	Seattle Seawolves	28–22	Rugby ATL (1 BP)	Starfire Stadium
19:30 PST	Try: Juan-Philip Smith 35'; Riekert Hattingh (2) 52', 70'; Con: Jordan Chait (2/3) 36', 53'; Pen: Jordan Chait (3/4) 6', 24', 42'; Cards: Rhyno Herbst (yellow card) 38'	Report	Try: Johan Momsen 39'; Tiaan Eramsus 58'; Ben Strang 75'; Con: Rewita Biddle (2/2) 40', 76'; Duncan van Schalkwyk (0/1); Pen: Rewita Biddle (1/2) 18'	Attendance: 3,000; Referee: Luke Rogan (USAR) Assistants: Saro Turner (RC) & Clint Lemkus (RC) TMO: Chris Assmus (RC) Man of the Match: Juan-Philip Smith (Seattle Seawolves)

February 25	(1 BP) Utah Warriors	33–25	Dallas Jackals (1 BP)	Zions Bank Stadium
14:00 MST	Try: Paul Lasike 6'; Caleb Makene 23'; Bailey Wilson 29'; Joseph Mano 53'; Zion Going 63'; Con: Joel Hodgson (3/3) 7', 24', 30'; Caleb Makene (1/2) 64'	Report	Try: Juan Pablo Zeiss 9'; Jerónimo Gómez Vara 34'; Nicolás Revol 58'; Eric Naposki (2) 68', 72'; Con: Martín Elías (0/1); Adriaan Carelse (0/4)	Attendance: 3,500; Referee: Marquise Goodwin (USAR) Assistants: Kahlil Harrison (USAR) & Justin Canova (USAR) TMO: Austin Reed (USAR) Man of the Match: Paul Lasike (Utah Warriors)

February 25	(1 BP) Houston SaberCats	35–14	New Orleans Gold	SaberCats Stadium
20:00 CST	Try: Vereniki Tikoisolomone 17'; Dom Akina 21'; Gideon van Wyk (2) 31', 48'; Christian Dyer 62'; Con: Davey Coetzer (4/4) 18', 22', 32', 49'; Automatic conversion 62'	Report	Try: Tom Florence (2) 6', 45'; Con: Automatic conversion (2) 6', 45'	Attendance: 1,600; Referee: Kat Roche (USAR) Assistants: Brian Dusablon (USAR) & Blair McClure (USAR) TMO: Chris Assmus (RC) Man of the Match: Gideon van Wyk (Houston SaberCats)

February 26	(1 BP) Rugby New York	39–3	Toronto Arrows	Mount Vernon Memorial Stadium
15:00 EST	Try: Dylan Fawsitt (2) 8', 28'; Nate Brakeley 41'; Kaleb Geiger 54'; Faʻasui Fuatai 64'; Eamonn Matthews 68'; Con: Sam Windsor (3/6) 42', 55', 65'; Pen: Sam Windsor (1/1) 39'	Report	Pen: Kobe Faust (1/2) 44'; Cards: Travis Larsen (yellow card) 38'	Attendance: 1,419; Referee: Derek Summers (USAR) Assistants: Miles McIvor (USAR) & Marty Steffens (USAR) TMO: Nick Hannon (USAR) Man of the Match: Nate Brakeley (Rugby New York)

February 26	(1 BP) San Diego Legion	29–12	New England Free Jacks	Snapdragon Stadium
13:00 PST	Try: Sama Malolo 12'; Nate Augspurger (2) 27', 80+5'; Josh Henderson 49'; Con: Josh Henderson (1/2) 13'; Automatic conversion 49'; Will Hooley (1/1) 60+6'; Pen: Josh Henderson (1/1) 60'; Will Hooley (0/1); Cards: Tupou Afungia (yellow card) 55'	Report	Try: Joe Johnston 31'; Semisi Paea 76'; Con: Jayson Potroz (1/1) 32'; Reece MacDonald (0/1)	Attendance: 4,500; Referee: Scott Green (USAR) Assistants: Austin Reed (USAR) & Alexis Alfaro (USAR) TMO: Chris Assmus (RC) Man of the Match: Josh Henderson (San Diego Legion)

Bye/s: Chicago Hounds, Old Glory DC

==== Week 3 (March 3–5) ====
March 3	Dallas Jackals	10–35	Seattle Seawolves (1 BP)	Choctaw Stadium
19:05 CST	Try: Herman Agenbag 67'; Con: Alejandro Torres (1/1) 68'; Pen: Alejandro Torres (1/1) 24'; Cards: Martín Elías (red card) 2'	Report	Try: Juan-Philip Smith 9'; Riekert Hattingh (2) 33', 44'; Duncan Matthews 54'; Nakai Penny 79'; Con: Automatic conversion (4) 9', 33', 44', 79'; AJ Alatimu (1/1) 55'	Referee: Federico Anselmi (UAR) Assistants: Andrew Low (USAR) & Cole Jones (USAR) TMO: Derek Summers (USAR) Man of the Match: Riekert Hattingh (Seattle Seawolves)

March 4	(1 BP) Rugby ATL	29-16	New Orleans Gold	Silverbacks Park
18:00 EST	Try: Johan Momsen 22'; Jason Damm 36'; Austin White 42'; Te Rangatira Waitokia 59'; Con: Kurt Coleman (3/4) 23', 37', 43'; Pen: Kurt Coleman (1/1) 52'; Cards: Alex Maughan (yellow card) 33'	Report	Try: Jordan Jackson-Hope 27'; Con: Rodney Iona (1/1) 28'; Pen: Rodney Iona (3/4) 1', 4', 32'; Cards: Tom Florence (yellow card) 36'	Referee: Robin Kaluzniak (RC) Assistants: Bryan Hall (USAR) & Pete Chamberlain (USAR) TMO: Nick Hannon (USAR) Man of the Match: Jason Damm (Rugby ATL)

March 5	(1 BP) Chicago Hounds	10–14	Utah Warriors	SeatGeek Stadium
13:00 (CST)	Try: Caleb Strum 30'; Con: Luke Carty (1/1) 31'; Pen: Luke Carty (1/1) 6'	Report	Try: Henry Bell 36'; Joseph Mano 52'; Con: Joel Hodgson (2/2) 37', 53'; Cards: Lance Williams (yellow card) 39'; Emerson Prior (yellow card) 70'	Attendance: 4,443; Referee: Luke Rogan (USAR) Assistants: David Zaccaria (USAR) & Niall Little (USAR) TMO: Nick Hannon (USAR) Man of the Match: Joseph Mano (Utah Warriors)

March 5	(1 BP) Houston SaberCats	31–26	San Diego Legion (2 BP)	SaberCats Stadium
14:00 (CST)	Try: Christian Dyer 12'; Gerrie Labuschagné 50'; Dom Akina 72'; Gideon van Wyk 78'; Con: Davey Coetzer (1/1) 13'; Automatic conversion 50'; Robbie Povey (2/2) 72', 79'; Pen: Davey Coetzer (1/1) 23'	Report	Try: Christian Poidevin 2'; Richard Judd 10'; Nate Augspurger 57'; Ben Grant 65'; Con: Josh Henderson (1/1) 3'; Automatic conversion (2) 10', 57'; Will Hooley (0/1); Cards: Djustice Sears-Duru (yellow card) 69'; Christian Poidevin (yellow card) 71'	Attendance: 2,100; Referee: Chris Assmus (RC) Assistants: Brian Dusablon (USAR) & Jono Cooper (USAR) TMO: Austin Reed (USAR) Man of the Match: Gerrie Labuschagné (Houston Sabercats)

March 5	(1 BP) Rugby New York	34–8	Old Glory DC	Mount Vernon Memorial Stadium
15:00 EST	Try: Jack Heighton (3) 3', 50', 61'; Dylan Fawsitt 10'; Sam Windsor 79'; Con: Jack Heighton (2/4) 51', 62'; Sam Windsor (1/1) 80'; Pen: Jack Heighton (1/1) 16'; Cards: Teihorangi Walden (yellow card) 29'; Pago Haini (yellow card) 73'	Report	Try: Joaquín Díaz Bonilla 31'; Con: Joaquín Díaz Bonilla (0/1); Pen: Joaquín Díaz Bonilla (1/1) 47'	Attendance: 1,229; Referee: Scott Green (USAR) Assistants: Lex Weiner (USAR) & Marty Steffens (USAR) TMO: Miles McIvor (USAR) Man of the Match: Jack Heighton (Rugby New York)

Bye/s: New England Free Jacks, Toronto Arrows

==== Week 4 (March 11–12) ====
March 11	(1 BP) New England Free Jacks	34–31	Old Glory DC (2 BP)	Veterans Memorial Stadium
15:00 EST	Try: Paula Balekana (2) 10', 34'; Ben LeSage 40'; John Poland 46'; Cam Davidowicz 68'; Con: Jayson Potroz (3/5) 35', 40+1', 69'; Pen: Jayson Potroz (1/1) 73'; Cards: Conor Keys (yellow card) 36'; Jesse Parete (yellow card) 52' (yellow-red card) 78'	Rewport	Try: William Talataina 8'; Cory Daniel 53'; Nic Souchon 59'; Mike Dabulas 79'; Con: Joaquín Díaz Bonilla (4/4) 9', 54', 60', 79'; Pen: Joaquín Díaz Bonilla (1/1) 24'	Attendance: 3,353; Referee: Derek Summers (USAR) Assistants: Amelia Luciano (USAR) & Chris Micheletti (RC) TMO: Nick Hannon (USAR) Man of the Match: John Poland (New England Free Jacks)

March 11	(1 BP) Chicago Hounds	26–27	Toronto Arrows	SeatGeek Stadium
19:00 CST	Try: Penalty try 18'; Maclean Jones 26'; Con: Luke Carty (1/1) 27'; Pen: Luke Carty (2/2) 10', 29'; Chris Mattina (2/2) 67', 74'; Cards: Maclean Jones (yellow card) 49'	Report	Try: Sam Malcolm (2) 13', 21'; Con: Sam Malcolm (1/2) 14'; Pen: Sam Malcolm (4/5) 38', 57', 61', 69'; Drop: Sam Malcolm (1/1) 77'; Cards: Lucas Rumball (yellow card) 18'; Noel Reid (yellow card) 28'; James O'Neill (yellow card) 65'	Attendance: 2,500; Referee: Marquise Goodwin (USAR) Assistants: Andrew Futerman (USAR) & Shawn Bastic (USAR) TMO: Nick Hannon (USAR) Man of the Match: Sam Malcolm (Toronto Arrows)

March 11	San Diego Legion	22–0	Dallas Jackals	Snapdragon Stadium
17:00 PST	Try: Tupou Afungia 7'; Sama Malolo 20'; Tomas Aoake 63'; Con: Automatic conversion 7'; Will Hooley (1/2) 64'; Pen: Will Hooley (1/1) 57'	Report	Pen: Marcus Moroni (0/1)	Referee: Paulo Duarte (FPR) Assistants: Benjamin Lebeaupin (USAR) & Will Nelson (USAR) TMO: Austin Reed (USAR) Man of the Match:

March 11	Seattle Seawolves	24–12	Houston SaberCats	Starfire Stadium
19:30 PST	Try: Peter Malcolm 12'; Riekert Hattingh 47'; Con: AJ Alatimu (1/2) 13'; Pen: AJ Alatimu (4/4) 20', 29', 55', 63'	Report	Try: Rob Cobb 9'; Gideon van Wyk 40+3'; Con: Davey Coetzer (1/2) 10'; Pen: Gerrie Labuschagné (0/1); Cards: Siaosi Mahoni (yellow card) 29'	Attendance: 3,000; Referee: Cisco Lopez (USAR) Assistants: Brad Schwalger (RC) & Clint Lemkus (RC) TMO: Austin Reed (USAR) Man of the Match: Rhyno Herbst (Seattle Seawolves)

March 12	(1 BP) New Orleans Gold	31–5	Rugby New York	The Gold Mine
14:00 EDT	Try: Rodney Iona (2) 29', 41'; Luke Campbell 45'; Jordan Trainor 52'; Con: Rodney Iona (4/4) 30', 42', 46', 53'; Pen: Rodney Iona (1/2) 73'	Report	Try: Faʻasui Fuatai 59'; Con: Sam Windsor (0/1); Cards: Brendon O'Connor (yellow card) 26'	Attendance: 1,500; Referee: Federico Anselmi (UAR) Assistants: Allen Alongi (USAR) & Rob Halcomb (USAR) TMO: Austin Reed (USAR) Man of the Match: Rodney Iona (New Orleans Gold)

Bye/s: Rugby ATL, Utah Warriors

==== Week 5 (March 18–19) ====
March 18	(1 BP) New Orleans Gold	37–14	Utah Warriors	The Gold Mine
14:00 CDT	Try: Jack Webster 7'; Cael Hodgson 19'; Pat O'Toole 36'; Luke Campbell 39'; Malcolm May 71'; JP du Plessis 79'; Con: Rodney Iona (1/5) 40'; Reece Botha (1/1) 80'; Pen: Rodney Iona (1/1) 25'	Report	Try: Lance Williams 50'; Mika Kruse 74'; Con: Joel Hodgson (1/1) 51'; Automatic conversion 74'; Cards: Ratu Veremalua Vugakoto (red card) 53'; Zion Going (yellow card) 77'	Attendance: 1,500; Referee: Scott Green (USAR) Assistants: Allen Alongi (USAR) & Rob Halcomb (USAR) TMO: Luke Rogan (USAR) Man of the Match: Malcolm May (New Orleans Gold)

March 18	Rugby ATL	10–35	San Diego Legion (1 BP)	Silverbacks Park
18:00 EDT	Try: Vili Helu 17'; Alex Maughan 47'; Con: Kurt Coleman (0/2)	Report	Try: Tomas Aoake 8'; Richard Judd (2) 27', 79'; Dan Pryor 52'; Nathan Sylvia 76'; Con: Will Hooley (2/3) 9', 53'; Josh Henderson (0/2); Pen: Will Hooley (2/2) 21', 40+3'; Cards: Isaac Ross (yellow card) 46'	Referee: Federico Anselmi (UAR) Assistants: Cisco Lopez (USAR) & Dave Edwards (USAR) TMO: Kahlil Harrison (USAR) Man of the Match: Richard Judd (San Diego Legion)

March 18	Chicago Hounds	24–22	Dallas Jackals (2 BP)	SeatGeek Stadium
18:00 CDT	Try: Mark O'Keeffe 15'; Julián Domínguez (2) 20', 57'; Con: Luke Carty (0/3); Pen: Luke Carty (2/2) 46', 52'; Chris Mattina (1/1) 77'; Cards: Michael de Waal (yellow card) 29'	Report	Try: Marcos Moroni 1'; Tomás Baravalle 30'; Jerónimo Gómez Vara 64'; Connor Robinson 68'; Con: Adriaan Carelse (1/3) 65; Marcos Moroni (0/1)	Referee: Kat Roche (USAR) Assistants: Niall Little (USAR) & Shawn Bastic (USAR) TMO: Derek Summers (USAR) Man of the Match: Chris Mattina (Chicago Hounds) 1st annual "Dog Bowl" match winners: Chicago Hounds (1–0)

March 18	(1 BP) Old Glory DC	29–3	Toronto Arrows	Segra Field
19:00 EDT	Try: Nic Souchon 14'; Marcos Young 44'; William Talataina 50'; Danny Tusitala 73'; Con: Joaquín Díaz Bonilla (3/4) 15', 51', 74'; Pen: Joaquín Díaz Bonilla (1/2) 36'	Report	Pen: Sam Malcolm (1/1) 3'; Cards: Mitch Eadie (yellow card) 35'; Kobe Faust (yellow card) 68'	Referee: Chris Assmus (RC) Assistants: Craig Sakowski (USAR) & Ian Seaton (USAR) TMO: Austin Reed (USAR) Man of the Match: Joaquín Díaz Bonilla (Old Glory DC)

March 19	Rugby New York	18–33	New England Free Jacks (1 BP)	Mount Vernon Memorial Stadium
15:00 EDT	Try: Quinn Ngawati 40+2'; Kara Pryor 46'; Con: Sam Windsor (1/2) 47'; Pen: Sam Windsor (2/2) 17', 38'; Cards: Kara Pryor (yellow card) 12'	Report	Try: Cam Davidowicz 22'; Paula Balekana (2) 28', 42'; Wayne van der Bank 57'; Con: Jayson Potroz (2/4) 29', 58'; Pen: Jayson Potroz (3/4) 61', 66', 80'	Attendance: 1,081; Referee: Jack Gohl (USAR) Assistants: Lex Weiner (USAR) & Marty Steffens (USAR) TMO: Miles McIvor (USAR) Man of the Match: Jayson Potroz (New England Free Jacks)

Bye/s: Houston SaberCats, Seattle Seawolves

==== Week 6 (March 25–26) ====
March 25	(1 BP) Old Glory DC	17–20	New Orleans Gold	Segra Field
15:00 EDT	Try: William Talataina 61'; Con: Joaquín Díaz Bonilla (0/1); Pen: Joaquín Díaz Bonilla (4/4) 3', 9', 23', 36'	Report	Try: JP du Plessis 20'; Jordan Trainor 64'; Con: Rodney Iona (2/2) 21', 65'; Pen: Rodney Iona (2/2) 38', 72'; Drop: Jordan Trainor (0/1)	Referee: Damián Schneider (UAR) Assistants: Aaron Davis (USAR) & Ian Seaton (USAR) TMO: Nick Hannon (USAR) Man of the Match: Rodney Iona (New Orleans Gold)

March 25	New England Free Jacks	10–9	Dallas Jackals (1 BP)	Veterans Memorial Stadium
16:30 EDT	Try: Wian Conradie 23'; Con: Jayson Potroz (1/1) 24'; Pen: Jayson Potroz (1/1) 17'; Cards: Reece MacDonald (yellow card) 40'	Report	Pen: Martín Elías (3/4) 12', 40+3', 52'	Attendance: 1,500; Referee: Robin Kaluzniak (RC) Assistants: Jarrod Ford (USAR) & Mike Rudzinsky (USAR) TMO: Austin Reed (USAR) Man of the Match: Reece MacDonald (New England Free Jacks)

March 25	(1 BP) Utah Warriors	47–19	Toronto Arrows	Zions Bank Stadium
14:30 MDT	Try: Joseph Mano (3) 39', 46', 68'; Paul Lasike 64'; Mika Kruse 71'; Onehunga Havili 73'; Caleb Makene 79'; Con: Joel Hodgson (3/7) 47', 65', 74'; Pen: Joel Hodgson (2/4) 9', 58'; Cards: Thomas Tu’avao (yellow card) 36'	Report	Try: Lolani Faleiva 15'; Gene Syminton 37'; Ross Braude 62'; Con: Sam Malcolm (2/3) 38', 63'	Attendance: 2,500; Referee: Cam Stone (NZR) Assistants: Kahlil Harrison (USAR) & Justin Canova (USAR) TMO: Derek Summers (USAR) Man of the Match: Joseph Mano (Utah Warriors)

March 25	(1 BP) Houston SaberCats	40–28	Rugby ATL (1 BP)	SaberCats Stadium
19:00 (CDT)	Try: Davey Coetzer (2) 20', 22'; Carlo de Nysschen 28'; Dean Muir 32'; Christian Dyer 37'; Gerrie Labuschagné 75'; Con: Davey Coetzer (5/5) 21', 23', 29', 33', 38'; Drew Wild (0/1); Drop: Davey Coetzer (0/1)	Report	Try: Jordan Brown 40+3'; Te Rangatira Waitokia 49'; Rowan Gouws 65'; Ryan Rees 80'; Con: Duncan van Schalkwyk (1/1) 40+4'; Automatic conversion 49'; Kurt Coleman (2/2) 66', 80+1'; Cards: Martini Talapusi (yellow card) 18'	Attendance: 2,500; Referee: Luke Rogan (USAR) Assistants: Jono Cooper (USAR) & Blair McClure (USAR) TMO: Austin Reed (USAR) Man of the Match: Davey Coetzer (Houston SaberCats)

March 26	Chicago Hounds	5–27	Seattle Seawolves	SeatGeek Stadium
15:00 CDT	Try: Lindsey Stevens 21'; Con: Luke Carty (0/1)	Report	Try: Riekert Hattingh 11'; Tavite Lopeti 16'; Lauina Futi 31'; Con: AJ Alatimu (3/3) 12', 17', 32'; Pen: AJ Alatimu (2/2) 3', 24'	Referee: Paulo Duarte (FPR) Assistants: Shawn Bastic (USAR) & David Zaccaria (USAR) TMO: Nick Hannon (USAR) Man of the Match: Note: Game called off after the first half was completed due to inclement weather.

Bye/s: Rugby New York, San Diego Legion

==== Week 7 (March 31 – April 2) ====
March 31	Utah Warriors	26–24	New England Free Jacks (1 BP)	Zions Bank Stadium
19:30 MDT	Try: Onehunga Havili 17'; Joseph Mano 26'; Mika Kruse 35'; Con: Joel Hodgson (1/3) 18'; Pen: Joel Hodgson (3/3) 4', 59', 76'	Report	Try: Wian Conradie 22'; Paula Balekana 29'; Isaac Olson 47'; Con: Jayson Potroz (3/3) 23', 30', 48'; Pen: Jayson Potroz (1/1) 10'; Cards: Conor Keys (yellow card) 34'	Referee: Federico Anselmi (UAR) Assistants: Kahlil Harrison (USAR) & Kage Green (USAR) TMO: Luke Rogan (USAR) Man of the Match: Joel Hodgson (Utah Warriors)

April 1	Dallas Jackals	14–11	Toronto Arrows (1 BP)	Choctaw Stadium
19:00 CDT	Try: Sam Golla 20'; Dewald Kotze 58'; Con: Automatic conversion 20'; Martín Elías (1/1) 59'; Pen: Martín Elías (0/1)	Report	Try: Ross Braude 48'; Con: Sam Malcolm (0/1); Pen: Sam Malcolm (2/2) 18', 33'	Referee: Mike Lash (NZR) Assistants: Cole Jones (USAR) & Andrew Low (USAR) TMO: Derek Summers (USAR) Man of the Match: Sam Golla (Dallas Jackals) Note: This is the Dallas Jackals' first win in league play.

April 2	Chicago Hounds	21–38	Houston SaberCats (1 BP)	SeatGeek Stadium
13:00 CDT	Try: Mason Koch 48'; Mark O'Keeffe 65'; Sean Yacoubian 80'; Con: Chris Mattina (3/3) 49', 66', 80+1'	Report	Try: Siaosi Mahoni 15'; Dom Akina 30'; Drew Wild 35'; Dean Muir 54'; Malon Al-Jiboori 63'; Davey Coetzer 73'; Con: Davey Coetzer (4/6) 31', 36', 64', 74'; Cards: Dean Muir (yellow card) 28'; Asa Carter (yellow card) 79'	Referee: Scott Green (USAR) Assistants: Shawn Bastic (USAR) & David Zaccaria (USAR) TMO: Luke Rogan (USAR) Man of the Match: Carlo de Nysschen (Houston SaberCats)

April 2	(2 BP) New Orleans Gold	35–36	Seattle Seawolves (1 BP)	The Gold Mine
14:00 CDT	Try: Dougie Fife 15'; JP du Plessis 26'; Tom Florence 32'; Penalty try 43'; Luke Campbell 77'; Con: Rodney Iona (4/4) 16', 27', 33', 78'; Automatic conversion 43'; Pen: Rodney Iona (0/2)	Report	Try: Conner Mooneyham (2) 1', 57'; Dan Kriel 50'; Mason Pedersen 61'; Jake Turnbull 69'; Con: AJ Alatimu (2/2) 2', 51'; Jordan Chait (2/3) 58', 70'; Pen: AJ Alatimu (1/1) 14'; Cards: Duncan Matthews (yellow card) 43'	Referee: Cam Stone (NZR) Assistants: Allen Alongi (USAR) & Rob Halcomb (USAR) TMO: Austin Reed (USAR) Man of the Match: Conner Mooneyham (Seattle Seawolves)

April 2	(1 BP) Rugby New York	31–20	Rugby ATL	Mount Vernon Memorial Stadium
15:00 EDT	Try: Ed Fidow 19'; Kara Pryor 41'; Quinn Ngawati 59'; Andrew Coe 73'; Jason Emery 80'; Con: Jack Heighton (3/5) 20', 42', 74'; Pen: Jack Heighton (0/1); Cards: Andrew Coe (yellow card) 23'; Kaleb Geiger (yellow card) 77'	Report	Try: Jason Damm 24'; Jack Shaw 54'; Ryan Rees 78'; Con: Duncan van Schalkwyk (1/2) 25'; Rewita Biddle (0/1); Pen: Duncan van Schalkwyk (1/1) 34'	Referee: Paulo Duarte (FPR) Assistants: Miles McIvor (USAR) & Marty Steffens (USAR) TMO: Nick Hannon (USAR) Man of the Match: Jack Heighton (Rugby New York)

April 2	(1 BP) San Diego Legion	48–26	Old Glory DC (1 BP)	Snapdragon Stadium
13:00 PDT	Try: Tomas Aoake 12'; Mike Te'o (2) 28', 45'; Blair Cowan 48'; Ma'a Nonu 66'; Christian Poidevin 78'; Nate Augspurger 80+1'; Con: Will Hooley (3/4) 13', 46', 67'; Automatic conversion 28'; Mike Te'o (0/1); Nate Augspurger (1/1) 80+2'; Pen: Will Hooley (1/1) 39'; Cards: Ma'a Nonu (yellow card) 16'	Report	Try: Joaquín Díaz Bonilla 10'; Mike Dabulas 23'; Peni Lasaqa 68'; John LeFevre 70'; Con: Joaquín Díaz Bonilla (2/3) 11', 71'; Automatic conversion 68'	Referee: Jack Gohl (USAR) Assistants: Jacob Gonzalez (USAR) & Will Nelson (USAR) TMO: Derek Summers (USAR) Man of the Match: Mike Te'o (San Diego Legion)

==== Week 8 (April 8) ====
April 8	(1 BP) New England Free Jacks	31–19	Chicago Hounds	Veterans Memorial Stadium
14:00 EDT	Try: John Poland 10'; Mitch Jacobson 22'; Le Roux Malan 58'; Foster DeWitt 67'; Paula Balekana 75'; Con: Reece MacDonald (2/4) 59', 68'; Automatic conversion 22'	Report	Try: JP Eloff 35'; Luke White 49'; Hugh Roach 73'; Con: Chris Mattina (2/3) 36', 50'; Cards: Chris Mattina (yellow card) 60'	Attendance: 2,807; Referee: Damián Schneider (UAR) Assistants: Amelia Luciano (USAR) & Mike Rudzinsky (USAR) TMO: Derek Summers (USAR) Man of the Match: Reece MacDonald (New England Free Jacks)

April 8	(2 BP) Toronto Arrows	27–29	Rugby New York (1 BP)	York Lions Stadium
16:00 EDT	Try: D'Shawn Bowen (3) 13', 32', 47'; Lucas Rumball 53'; Con: Sam Malcolm (1/3) 14'; Automatic conversion 32'; Pen: Sam Malcolm (1/1) 23'	Report	Try: Teihorangi Walden 9'; Andrew Coe 18'; Faʻasui Fuatai 39'; Nick Feakes 44'; Con: Automatic conversion 9'; Jack Heighton (1/1) 19'; Sam Windsor (1/2) 40'; Pen: Jack Heighton (1/1) 3'; Cards: Faʻasui Fuatai (yellow card) 50'	Referee: Robin Kaluzniak (RC) Assistants: Michael Jones (RC) & Peter Pender (RC) TMO: Andrew Hosie (RC) Man of the Match: D'Shawn Bowen (Toronto Arrows)

April 8	(1 BP) Rugby ATL	35–27	Old Glory DC (1 BP)	Silverbacks Park
18:00 EDT	Try: Rewita Biddle 4'; Te Rangatira Waitokia (2) 28', 43'; Alex Maughan 58'; Con: Duncan van Schalkwyk (2/3) 5'. 29'; Rewita Biddle (1/1) 59'; Pen: Duncan van Schalkwyk (2/2) 11', 14'; Rewita Biddle (1/1) 67'; Cards: Johan Momsen (yellow card) 32'; Rewita Biddle (yellow card) 36'; Te Rangatira Waitokia (yellow card) 72'	Report	Try: William Talataina 38'; Danny Tusitala 47'; Marcos Young 50'; Thretton Palamo 79'; Con: Automatic conversion (2) 38', 47'; Gradyn Bowd (0/2); Pen: Gradyn Bowd (1/1) 56'	Attendance: 1,500; Referee: Cam Stone (NZR) Assistants: Dave Edwards (USAR) & Bryan Hall (USAR) TMO: Nick Hannon (USAR) Man of the Match: Rewita Biddle (Rugby ATL)

April 8	(1 BP) Houston Sabercats	24–30	Utah Warriors	SaberCats Stadium
19:00 CDT	Try: Danny Barrett 10'; Axel Zapata 75'; Nick Boyer 78'; Con: Davey Coetzer (3/3) 11', 76', 78'; Pen: Davey Coetzer (1/1) 29'; Cards: Wynand Grassmann (yellow card) 44'	Report	Try: Connor McLeod 21'; Caleb Makene 38'; Cliven Loubser 56'; Con: Automatic conversion (2) 21', 56'; Joel Hodgson (1/1) 39'; Pen: Joel Hodgson (3/3) 5', 44', 63'; Cards: Bailey Wilson (yellow card) 27'; Saia Uhila (yellow card) 74'	Attendance: 1,000; Referee: Mike Lash (NZR) Assistants: Brian Dusablon (USAR) & Jono Cooper (USAR) TMO: Derek Summers (USAR) Man of the Match: Lance Williams (Utah Warriors)

April 8	(1 BP) Seattle Seawolves	20–23	San Diego Legion	Starfire Stadium
17:00 PDT	Try: Charles Elton 46'; Jordan Chait 55'; Con: Automatic conversion 46'; Jordan Chait (1/1) 56'; Pen: Jordan Chait (2/2) 17', 59'	Report	Try: Tevita Tameilau 37'; Nate Augspurger (2) 60', 64'; Con: Will Hooley (1/3) 61'; Pen: Will Hooley (2/3) 7', 21'; Cards: Ma'a Nonu (yellow card) 16'	Attendance: 4,000; Referee: Federico Anselmi (UAR) Assistants: Brad Schwalger (RC) & Saro Turner (RC) TMO: Austin Reed (USAR) Man of the Match: Nate Augspurger (San Diego Legion)

Bye/s: Dallas Jackals, New Orleans Gold

==== Week 9 (April 15–16) ====
April 15	Toronto Arrows	5–80	New England Free Jacks (1 BP)	York Lions Stadium
18:00 EDT	Try: Noel Reid 50'; Con: Shane O'Leary (0/1); Cards: Peter Nelson (yellow card) 5'; Dawson Fatoric (yellow card) 32'	Report	Try: Andrew Quattrin (2) 3', 29'; Mitch Jacobson 6'; Penalty try (2) 13', 32'; John Poland 24'; Taniela Filimone 36'; Paula Balekana 39'; Le Roux Malan (2) 47', 66'; Joe Johnston 54'; Cam Davidowicz 71'; Con: Jayson Potroz (8/10) 4', 7', 25', 30', 40', 55', 67', 72'	Attendance: 2,000; Referee: Paulo Duarte (FPR) Assistants: Michael Jones (RC) & Peter Pender (RC) TMO: Andrew Hosie (RC) Man of the Match: John Poland (New England Free Jacks)

April 15	(1 BP) Houston SaberCats	33–21	Dallas Jackals	SaberCats Stadium
19:00 CDT	Try: Carlo de Nysschen 9'; Gideon van Wyk 21'; Dean Muir 49'; Vereniki Tikoisolomone 68'; Davey Coetzer 77'; Con: Davey Coetzer (4/5) 10', 22', 50', 78'; Drop: Drew Wild (0/1); Cards: Gideon van Wyk (red card) 31'	Report	Try: Sam Golla 16'; Adriaan Booysen 27'; Jerónimo Gómez Vara 41'; Con: Martín Elías (2/2) 17', 28'; Automatic conversion 41'; Drop: Alejandro Torres (0/1); Cards: Conrado Roura (yellow card) 48'	Referee: Damián Schneider (UAR) Assistants: Justin Hale (USAR) & Blair McClure (USAR) TMO: Scott Green (USAR) Man of the Match: Davey Coetzer (Houston SaberCats)

April 15	New Orleans Gold	7–23	Rugby ATL	The Gold Mine
19:00 CDT	Try: Pat O'Toole 31'; Con: Rodney Iona (1/1) 32'; Cards: JP du Plessis (yellow card) 23'	Report	Try: Will Leonard 10'; Alex Maughan 35'; Con: Duncan van Schalkwyk (2/2) 11', 36'; Pen: Duncan van Schalkwyk (2/2) 25', 51'; Kurt Coleman (1/1) 62'	Referee: Luke Rogan (USAR) Assistants: Allen Alongi (USAR) & Brian Dusablon (USAR) TMO: Mike Lash (NZR) Man of the Match: Johan Momsen (Rugby ATL)

April 15	(1 BP) Utah Warriors	41–35	Seattle Seawolves (2 BP)	Zions Bank Stadium
19:30 MDT	Try: Thomas Tu’avao 1'; Mika Kruse 26'; Joel Hodgson 38'; Joseph Mano 49'; Cliven Loubser 65'; Lance Williams 73'; Con: Automatic conversion (2) 1', 38'; Joel Hodgson (2/4) 27', 50'; Pen: Joel Hodgson (1/1) 58'; Cards: Saia Uhila (yellow card) 10'; Joseph Mano (yellow card) 11'	Report	Try: Penalty try 10'; Duncan Matthews 22'; Lauina Futi 42'; Conner Mooneyham 51'; Jake Turnbull 79'; Con: AJ Alatimu (3/3) 23', 43', 52'; Adriaan Carelse (1/1) 79'	Referee: Chris Assmus (RC) Assistants: Kahlil Harrison (USAR) & Kage Green (USAR) TMO: Derek Summers (USAR) Man of the Match: Joel Hodgson (Utah Warriors)

April 16	(1 BP) Old Glory DC	42–31	Rugby New York (1 BP)	Segra Field
15:00 EDT	Try: William Talataina (2) 17', 67'; Lautaro Bavaro (2) 24', 62'; Junior Sa'u 48'; Jamason Faʻanana-Schultz 59'; Con: Gradyn Bowd (2/5) 25', 63'; Automatic conversion 67'; Pen: Joaquín Díaz Bonilla (2/2) 77', 79'; Cards: Alejo Daireaux (yellow card) 80'	Report	Try: Dylan Fawsitt 3'; Andrew Coe 20'; Hamish Dalzell 36'; Kara Pryor 64'; Con: Jason Emery (4/4) 4', 21', 37', 65'; Pen: Jason Emery (1/1) 13'	Referee: Federico Anselmi (UAR) Assistants: Aaron Davis (USAR) & Craig Sakowski (USAR) TMO: Mike Lash (NZR) Man of the Match: Danny Tusitala (Old Glory DC)

April 16	(1 BP) San Diego Legion	48–24	Chicago Hounds (1 BP)	Snapdragon Stadium
13:00 PDT	Try: Mike Te'o 4'; Nate Augspurger 24'; Dan Pryor 40'; Ma'a Nonu 48'; Thomas Morani (2) 60', 68'; Tupou Afungia 69'; Chris Baumann 80'; Con: Josh Henderson (2/4) 25', 49'; Will Hooley (2/4) 70', 80+1'	Report	Try: Bill Meakes 14'; Hugh Roach 32'; Mark O'Keeffe 46'; Michael de Waal 63'; Con: Chris Mattina (1/3) 33'; Automatic conversion 63'	Attendance: 3,200; Referee: Cam Stone (NZR) Assistants: Marquise Goodwin (USAR) & Alexis Alfaro (USAR) TMO: Derek Summers (USAR) Man of the Match: Nate Augspurger (San Diego Legion)

==== Week 10 (April 22–23) ====
April 22	New England Free Jacks	23–13	Rugby ATL	Veterans Memorial Stadium
15:00 EDT	Try: Le Roux Malan 37'; Spencer Jones 52'; Paula Balekana 68'; Con: Jayson Potroz (1/3) 69'; Pen: Jayson Potroz (2/3) 59', 64'; Cards: Jesse Parete (yellow card) 9' (yellow-red card) 33'	Report	Try: Alex Maughan 10'; Rewita Biddle 31'; Con: Duncan van Schalkwyk (0/1); Kurt Coleman (0/1); Pen: Kurt Coleman (1/1) 25'; Cards: Alex Maughan (yellow card) 63'	Referee: Scott Green (USAR) Assistants: Amelia Luciano (USAR) & Mike Rudzinsky (USAR) TMO: Derek Summers (USAR) Man of the Match: Le Roux Malan <smal>(New England Free Jacks)

April 22	(1 BP) Old Glory DC	36–22	Utah Warriors (1 BP)	Segra Field
15:00 EDT	Try: Peni Lasaqa 4'; Nic Souchon 11'; Penalty try 21'; William Talataina 73'; Quentin Newcomer 75'; Con: Gradyn Bowd (3/4) 5', 12', 74'; Automatic conversion 21'; Pen: Gradyn Bowd (1/1) 33'; Cards: Kyle Baillie (yellow card) 29'	Report	Try: Lance Williams (2) 17', 35'; Mika Kruse 29'; Ratu Veremalua Vugakoto 69'; Con: Joel Hodgson (1/3) 36'; Caleb Makene (0/1); Cards: Joel Hodgson (yellow card) 21'	Referee: Cam Stone (NZR) Assistants: Ian Seaton (USAR) & Aaron Davis (USAR) TMO: Chris Assmus (RC) Man of the Match: Gradyn Bowd (Old Glory DC)

April 22	(1 BP) Dallas Jackals	38–47	San Diego Legion (1 BP)	Choctaw Stadium
19:00 CDT	Try: Conrado Roura 13'; Tomás Malanos (2) 31', 38'; Adriaan Booysen 58'; Jerónimo Gómez Vara 73'; Campbell Johnstone 78'; Con: Martín Elías (2/4) 32', 79'; Automatic conversion (2) 38', 73'; Cards: Liam Murray (yellow card) 22'; Alejandro Torres (yellow card) 54'; Juan Pablo Zeiss (yellow card) 67'	Report	Try: Isaac Ross 8'; Tomas Aoake 27'; Sean McNulty 33'; Tiaan Loots (2) 45', 80'; Tevita Tameilau 48'; Penalty try 54'; Con: Will Hooley (5/6) 28', 34', 46', 49', 80+1'; Cards: Jale Vakaloloma (yellow card) 57'; Filimona Waqainabete (yellow card) 77'	Referee: Kahlil Harrison (USAR) Assistants: Cole Jones (USAR) & Justin Hale (USAR) TMO: Derek Summers (USAR) Man of the Match: Tiaan Loots (San Diego Legion)

April 23	(1 BP) Chicago Hounds	24–37	New Orleans Gold (1 BP)	SeatGeek Stadium
13:00 CDT	Try: Michael Baska 29'; Mason Koch 60'; Matai Leuta 66'; Charlie Abel 78'; Con: Chris Mattina (1/2) 30'; Luke Carty (1/2) 79'	Report	Try: Luke Campbell 5'; Pat O'Toole 23'; Ross Depperschmidt 26'; JP du Plessis 32'; Con: Rodney Iona (4/4) 6', 24', 27', 33'; Pen: Rodney Iona (2/2) 10', 49'; Damian Stevens (1/1) 76'; Cards: Rodney Iona (yellow card) 60'	Referee: Kat Roche (USAR) Assistants: Shawn Bastic (USAR) & Andrew Dunn (USAR) TMO: Greg Gilliam (USAR) Man of the Match: JP du Plessis (New Orleans Gold)

April 23	(2 BP) Rugby New York	27–34	Houston SaberCats (1 BP)	Mount Vernon Memorial Stadium
14:30 EDT	Try: Conor McManus 3'; Brooklyn Hardaker 52'; Andrew Coe 63'; Nick Feakes 80+1'; Con: Sam Windsor (1/2) 80+2'; Jason Emery (1/2) 53'; Pen: Sam Windsor (1/1) 21'	Report	Try: Davey Coetzer 24'; Carlo de Nysschen 32'; Vereniki Tikoisolomone 35'; Dean Muir 40+2'; Christian Dyer 72'; Con: Davey Coetzer (3/5) 33', 40+3', 73'; Pen: Davey Coetzer (1/1) 67'; Drop: Davey Coetzer (0/1); Cards: Siaosi Mahoni (yellow card) 21'	Referee: Mike Lash (NZR) Assistants: Paulo Duarte (FPR) & Miles McIvor (USAR) TMO: Chris Assmus (RC) Man of the Match:

April 23	Toronto Arrows	27–36	Seattle Seawolves (1 BP)	York Lions Stadium
16:00 EDT	Try: Ross Braude (2) 22', 40'; Penalty try 80+1'; Con: Shane O'Leary (1/1) 23'; Automatic conversion 40'; Pen: Shane O'Leary (2/3) 14', 20'; Cards: Kobe Faust (yellow card) 48'	Report	Try: Martin Iosefo 3'; James Malcolm 26'; Riekert Hattingh (2) 42', 68'; Ronan Foley 72'; Con: AJ Alatimu (4/5) 4', 27', 69', 73'; Pen: AJ Alatimu (1/2) 62'; Cards: Isaia Lotawa (yellow card) 80+1'	Attendance: 2,000; Referee: Luke Rogan (USAR) Assistants: Peter Pender (RC) & Clint Lemkus (RC) TMO: Andrew Hosie (RC) Man of the Match:

==== Week 11 (April 28–30) ====
April 28	(1 BP) Seattle Seawolves	61–19	Dallas Jackals	Starfire Stadium
19:00 PDT	Try: Dan Kriel (2) 6', 40'; Riekert Hattingh (3) 11', 32', 37'; Peter Malcolm 18'; Adriaan Carelse 47'; Ben Landry 59'; Andrew Durutalo 67'; Con: Jordan Chait (8/9) 7', 12', 33', 38', 40+1', 48', 60', 68'; Cards: Jake Turnbull (yellow card) 41'	Report	Try: Marcos Moroni 8'; Adriaan Booysen 61'; Tomás Malanos 78'; Con: Martín Elías (2/3) 98', 62'; Cards: Lucas Bur (yellow card) 55'; Jerónimo Gómez Vara (yellow card) 57'	Referee: Cisco Lopez (USAR) Assistants: Brad Schwalger (RC) & Saro Turner (RC) TMO: Mike Lash (NZR) Man of the Match: Dan Kriel (Seattle Seawolves)

April 30	(1 BP) New Orleans Gold	40–24	Toronto Arrows	The Gold Mine
14:00 CDT	Try: JP du Plessis 7'; Eric Howard 11'; Jordan Jackson-Hope 50'; Matt Harmon 61'; Harley Wheeler 67'; Maciu Koroi 71'; Con: Automatic conversion (2) 7', 50'; Rodney Iona (2/3) 12', 62'; Damian Stevens (1/1) 72'	Report	Try: Mitch Richardson 18'; Lolani Faleiva 43'; Ramón Ayarza 80+1'; Con: Automatic conversion 18'; Shane O'Leary (2/2) 44', 80+2'; Pen: Shane O'Leary (1/2) 33'	Referee: Paulo Duarte (FPR) Assistants: Allen Alongi (USAR) & Rob Halcomb (USAR) TMO: Scott Green (USAR) Man of the Match: Jordan Jackson-Hope (New Orleans Gold)

April 30	New England Free Jacks	8–0	Rugby New York	Veterans Memorial Stadium
15:00 EDT	Try: Paula Balekana 6'; Con: Jayson Potroz (0/1); Pen: Jayson Potroz (1/3) 39'; Cards: Reece MacDonald (yellow card) 69'	Report		Referee: Chris Assmus (RC) Assistants: Amelia Luciano (USAR) & Jarrod Ford (USAR) TMO: Mike Lash (NZR) Man of the Match: Jayson Potroz (New England Free Jacks)

April 30	(1 BP) San Diego Legion	29–16	Houston Sabercats	Snapdragon Stadium
13:00 PDT	Try: Marcel Brache 10'; Mike Te'o 30'; Nathan Sylvia 70'; Will Hooley 80'; Con: Automatic conversion 10'; Josh Henderson (1/1) 31'; Will Hooley (1/2) 71'; Pen: Josh Henderson (1/1) 29'; Cards: Sama Malolo (yellow card) 40'	Report	Try: Joe Taufeteʻe 13'; Con: Davey Coetzer (1/1) 14'; Pen: Davey Coetzer (3/3) 8', 34', 40+3'	Referee: Federico Anselmi (UAR) Assistants: Austin Reed (USAR) & Jacob Gonzalez (USAR) TMO: Derek Summers (USAR) Man of the Match: Richard Judd (San Diego Legion)

Bye/s: Chicago Hounds, Old Glory DC, Rugby ATL, Utah Warriors

==== Week 12 (May 6–7) ====
May 6	Rugby ATL	27–12	Chicago Hounds	Silverbacks Park
18:00 EDT	Try: Jack Shaw 20'; Te Rangatira Waitokia 36'; Penalty try 73'; Con: Kurt Coleman (1/1) 21'; Duncan van Schalkwyk (1/1) 37'; Pen: Kurt Coleman (1/1) 7'; Duncan van Schalkwyk (1/1) 53'	Report	Try: Mason Koch 26'; John Cullen 40+1'; Con: Luke Carty (1/2) 27'; Cards: Charlie Abel (yellow card) 71'; Michael de Waal (yellow card) 73'	Referee: Federico Anselmi (UAR) Assistants: Cisco Lopez (USAR) & Dave Edwards (USAR) TMO: Nick Hannon (USAR) Man of the Match: Rewita Biddle (Rugby ATL)

May 6	(1 BP) Dallas Jackals	3–7	Old Glory DC	Choctaw Stadium
19:00 CDT	Con: Martín Elías (1/1) 4'	Report	Try: William Talataina 40'; Con: Gradyn Bowd (1/1) 40+1'; Cards: Langilangi Haupeakui (yellow card) 28'	Referee: Luke Rogan (USAR) Assistants: Andrew Low (USAR) & Cole Jones (USAR) TMO: Scott Green (USAR) Man of the Match: Note: Game called off after the first half was completed due to inclement weather.

May 6	Utah Warriors	16–26	San Diego Legion	Zions Bank Stadium
19:30 MDT	Try: Logan Tago 7'; Caleb Makene 36'; Con: Joel Hodgson (0/2); Pen: Joel Hodgson (2/2) 46', 62'	Report	Try: Matías Freyre 42'; Michael Smith 76'; Con: Luke Burton (1/1) 43'; Automatic conversion 76'; Pen: Luke Burton (3/4) 12', 33', 54'; Will Hooley (1/1) 64'; Cards: Ma'a Nonu (yellow card) 8'; Ben Grant (yellow card) 19'; Mike Te'o (yellow card) 35'	Referee: Joe James (RFU) Assistants: Brad Schwalger (RC) & Kage Green (USAR) TMO: Derek Summers (USAR) Man of the Match: Luke Burton (San Diego Legion)

May 7	(1 BP) Rugby New York	54–19	New Orleans Gold	Mount Vernon Memorial Stadium
15:00 EDT	Try: Andrew Coe (2) 9', 44'; Jason Emery (2) 21', 41'; Ed Fidow 28'; Faʻasui Fuatai 30'; Connor Buckley 33'; Dylan Fawsitt 40+1'; Con: Jason Emery (7/8) 10', 21', 29', 34', 40+2', 42', 46'	Report	Try: JP du Plessis (2) 5', 56'; Cam Dolan 48'; Con: Jordan Jackson-Hope (2/3) 6', 49'	Attendance: 1,460; Referee: Mike Lash (NZR) Assistants: Lex Weiner (USAR) & Miles McIvor (USAR) TMO: Nick Hannon (USAR) Man of the Match: Jason Emery (Rugby New York)

Bye/s: Houston Sabercats, New England Free Jacks, Seattle Seawolves, Toronto Arrows

==== Week 13 (May 12–14) ====
May 12	(1 BP) Toronto Arrows	34–34	Rugby ATL (1 BP)	York Lions Stadium
19:00 EDT	Try: Avery Oitomen 33'; Mitch Richardson 48'; Ross Braude 62'; D'Shawn Bowen 68'; Con: Shane O'Leary (2/2) 34', 63'; Automatic conversion (2) 48', 69'; Pen: Shane O'Leary (2/2) 38', 77'; Cards: Isaac Salmon (yellow card) 66'	Report	Try: Matt Heaton 3'; Alex Maughan 15'; Jack Shaw 51'; Rewita Biddle 54'; Con: Duncan van Schalkwyk (2/2) 4', 16'; Martini Talapusi (2/2) 52', 55'; Pen: Duncan van Schalkwyk (1/1) 7'; Martini Talapusi (1/1) 66'	Attendance: 900; Referee: Joe James (RFU) Assistants: Peter Pender (RC) & Clint Lemkus (RC) TMO: Andrew Hosie (RC) Man of the Match: Mitch Richardson (Toronto Arrows)

May 13	(1 BP) Dallas Jackals	26–36	Utah Warriors (1 BP)	Choctaw Stadium
17:00 CDT	Try: Nicolás Revol 27'; Marcos Moroni 33'; Juan Pablo Zeiss (2) 44', 68'; Con: Martín Elías (3/4) 28', 34', 69'; Cards: Alejandro Torres (yellow card) 53'; Jerónimo Gómez Vara (yellow card) 72'	Report	Try: Connor McLeod (3) 6', 8', 19'; Joseph Mano (2) 10', 55'; Con: Automatic conversion (2) 6', 8'; Joel Hodgson (2/3) 11', 20'; Pen: Joel Hodgson (1/2) 42'; Cards: Thomas Tu’avao (yellow card) 22'	Referee: Robin Kaluzniak (RC) Assistants: Andrew Low (USAR) & Justin Hale (USAR) TMO: Greg Gilliam (USAR) Man of the Match: Connor McLeod (Utah Warriors)

May 13	New Orleans Gold	12–26	San Diego Legion (1 BP)	The Gold Mine
17:00 CDT	Try: Aaron Matthews 31'; Malcolm May 45'; Con: Reece Botha (1/2) 32'; Pen: Reece Botha (0/2)	Report	Try: Tiaan Loots 24'; Michael Smith 37'; Dan Pryor 56'; Thomas Morani 77'; Con: Josh Henderson (2/2) 25', 38'; Will Hooley (1/2) 78'; Cards: Dan Pryor (yellow card) 29'; Sama Malolo (yellow card) 73'	Referee: Scott Green (USAR) Assistants: Allen Alongi (USAR) & Rob Halcomb (USAR) TMO: Nick Hannon (USAR) Man of the Match: Michael Smith (San Diego Legion)

May 13	Houston Sabercats	17–34	Seattle Seawolves (1 BP)	SaberCats Stadium
19:00 CDT	Try: Joe Taufeteʻe 13'; Louritz van der Schyff 23'; Christian Dyer 48'; Con: Davey Coetzer (1/3) 24'; Pen: Gerrie Labuschagné (0/1); Drop: Gerrie Labuschagné (0/1)	Report	Try: Samu Manoa 50'; Lauina Futi (3) 58', 65', 78'; Martin Iosefo 60'; Con: AJ Alatimu (3/5) 51', 59', 61'; Pen: AJ Alatimu (1/1) 6'; Cards: Mason Pedersen (yellow card) 46'	Referee: Mike Lash (NZR) Assistants: Jono Cooper (USAR) & Brian Dusablon (USAR) TMO: Austin Reed (USAR) Man of the Match: Lauina Futi (Seattle Seawolves)

May 14	(1 BP) Old Glory DC	24–42	New England Free Jacks (1 BP)	Segra Field
13:30 EDT	Try: Jamason Faʻanana-Schultz 16'; Nic Souchon 51'; Collin Grosse 57'; Owen Sheehy 70'; Con: Gradyn Bowd (2/4) 17', 58'	Report	Try: Mills Sanerivi 4'; John Poland 19'; Wian Conradie (2) 24', 46'; Reece MacDonald 32'; Holden Yungert 77'; Con: Jayson Potroz (6/6) 5', 20', 25', 33', 47', 78'; Cards: Mitch Wilson (yellow card) 50'	Attendance: * Referee: Federico Anselmi (UAR) Assistants: Aaron Davis (USAR) & Ian Seaton (USAR) TMO: Greg Gilliam (USAR) Man of the Match: Wian Conradie (New England Free Jacks)

May 14	(1 BP) Chicago Hounds	20–21	Rugby New York	SeatGeek Stadium
13:00 CDT	Try: Penalty try 20'; Julián Domínguez 49'; Con: Luke Carty (1/1) 50'; Pen: Luke Carty (2/3) 34', 45'	Report	Try: Dylan Fawsitt 13'; Andrew Coe 60'; Benjamín Bonasso 76'; Con: Jason Emery (1/1) 14'; Sam Windsor (2/2) 61', 77'; Cards: Nick Feakes (yellow card) 20'	Referee: Derek Summers (USAR) Assistants: David Zaccaria (USAR) & Andrew Dunn (USAR) TMO: Kahlil Harrison (USAR) Man of the Match: Sam Windsor (Rugby New York)

==== Week 14 (May 18–21) ====
May 18	(1 BP) Toronto Arrows	29–29	Old Glory DC (1 BP)	York Lions Stadium
19:00 EDT	Try: Ciaran Breen 17'; Ross Braude 40+1'; Liam Bowman 70'; D'Shawn Bowen 79'; Con: Shane O'Leary (2/2) 18', 40+1'; Peter Nelson (1/2) 71'; Pen: Shane O'Leary (1/2) 49'; Cards: James O'Neill (yellow card) 53'	Report	Try: Jamason Faʻanana-Schultz 2'; Peni Lasaqa 18'; Joaquín Díaz Bonilla 54'; Marcos Young 65'; John LeFevre 75'; Con: Gradyn Bowd (1/3) 3'; Joaquín Díaz Bonilla (0/1); Automatic conversion 75'	Referee: Mike Lash (NZR) Assistants: Peter Pender (RC) & Clint Lemkus (RC) TMO: Greg Gilliam (USAR) Man of the Match: Ross Braude (Toronto Arrows)

May 20	Rugby ATL	19–27	Dallas Jackals (1 BP)	Silverbacks Park
12:00 EDT	Try: Te Rangatira Waitokia (2) 31', 45'; Martini Talapusi 79'; Con: Kurt Coleman (1/3) 32'; Automatic conversion 79'	Report	Try: Dewald Kotze (2) 35', 68'; Sam Golla 60'; Tomás Malanos 77'; Con: Martín Elías (1/3); Automatic conversion 77'; Pen: Martín Elías (0/1); Drop: Martín Elías (1/1) 40'	Referee: Chris Assmus (RC) Assistants: Cisco Lopez (USAR) & Dave Edwards (USAR) TMO: Greg Gilliam (USAR) Man of the Match: Dewald Kotze (Dallas Jackals)

May 20	(1 BP) Utah Warriors	34–28	Houston Sabercats (2 BP)	Zions Bank Stadium
19:30 MDT	Try: Connor McLeod 17'; Joel Hodgson 36'; Joseph Mano 40'; Mika Kruse 42'; Con: Joel Hodgson (1/4) 18'; Pen: Joel Hodgson (2/2) 13', 32'; Caleb Makene (2/3) 61', 78'; Cards: John DuPree (yellow card) 71'	Report	Try: Gideon van Wyk (3) 14', 27', 51'; Zachary Pangelinan 80'; Con: Davey Coetzer (1/2) 28'; Drew Wild (0/2); Pen: Davey Coetzer (1/1) 4'; Drew Wild (1/1) 34'	Attendance: 4,500; Referee: Federico Anselmi (UAR) Assistants: Kahlil Harrison (USAR) & Justin Canova (USAR) TMO: Derek Summers (USAR) Man of the Match: Joseph Mano (Utah Warriors)

May 20	(1 BP) Seattle Seawolves	35–13	Chicago Hounds	Starfire Stadium
19:30 PDT	Try: Juan-Philip Smith 10'; Martin Iosefo 23'; James Malcolm 37'; Ronan Foley 44'; Jake Turnbull 57'; Con: AJ Alatimu (5/5) 11', 24', 38', 45', 58'	Report	Try: Maclean Jones 71'; Con: Automatic conversion 71'; Pen: Luke Carty (2/2) 6', 20'; Cards: George Thornton (yellow card) 54'	Attendance: 4,500; Referee: Robin Kaluzniak (RC) Assistants: Lex Weiner (USAR) & Saro Turner (RC) TMO: Austin Reed (USAR) Man of the Match: Juan-Philip Smith (Seattle Seawolves)

May 21	(1 BP) New England Free Jacks	50–3	New Orleans Gold	Veterans Memorial Stadium
15:00 EDT	Try: Paula Balekana (2) 9', 19'; Mitch Wilson (2) 12', 52'; Kyle Ciquera 28'; Wayne van der Bank 48'; Wian Conradie 69'; Cam Davidowicz 77'; Con: Jayson Potroz (4/7) 13', 20', 49', 53'; Automatic conversion 77'	Report	Pen: Damian Stevens (1/2) 25'; Cards: Sean Paranihi (yellow card) 22'	Attendance: 3,442; Referee: Joe James (RFU) Assistants: Amelia Luciano (USAR) & Mike Rudzinsky (USAR) TMO: Derek Summers (USAR) Man of the Match: Reece MacDonald (New England Free Jacks)

Bye/s: Rugby New York, San Diego Legion

==== Week 15 (May 27–28) ====
May 27	(1 BP) New England Free Jacks	57–20	Toronto Arrows	Veterans Memorial Stadium
16:00 EDT	Try: Slade McDowall (2) 5', 53'; Kieran McClea 16'; Mills Sanerivi (2) 23', 41'; Tevita Sole 32'; Mitch Wilson 56'; Taniela Filimone 62'; Andrew Quattrin 75'; Con: Jayson Potroz (5/7) 6', 24', 33', 54', 57'; Beaudein Waaka (1/2) 76'	Report	Try: Tautalatasi Tasi (2) 40', 50'; Con: Shane O'Leary (2/2) 40', 51'; Pen: Peter Nelson (2/2) 3', 26'	Attendance: 3,364; Referee: Kat Roche (USAR) Assistants: Amelia Luciano (USAR) & Jarrod Ford (USAR) TMO: Austin Reed (USAR) Man of the Match: Slade McDowall (New England Free Jacks)

May 27	Old Glory DC	19–41	Seattle Seawolves (1 BP)	Segra Field
18:00 EDT	Try: John Rizzo 12'; William Talataina 73'; Doug Fraser 80+2'; Con: Joaquín Díaz Bonilla (2/3) 13', 74'; Pen: Joaquín Díaz Bonilla (0/1)	Report	Try: Lauina Futi (3) 19', 26', 50'; Adriaan Carelse 40'; Martin Iosefo (2) 56', 76'; Ronan Foley 66'; Con: AJ Alatimu (3/7) 27', 41', 77'; Pen: AJ Alatimu (0/1)	Referee: Luke Rogan (USAR) Assistants: Aaron Davis (USAR) & Craig Sakowski (USAR) TMO: Nick Hannon (USAR) Man of the Match: Lauina Futi (Seattle Seawolves)

May 27	(1 BP) Houston Sabercats	40–33	Chicago Hounds (2 BP)	SaberCats Stadium
19:00 CDT	Try: Vereniki Tikoisolomone 5'; Joe Taufeteʻe 11'; Dom Akina 15'; Gideon van Wyk (2) 33', 79'; Robbie Povey 37'; Con: Robbie Povey (5/6) 12', 16', 34', 38', 80'; Cards: Christian Dyer (yellow card) 43'; Drew Wild (yellow card) 48'; Emmanuel Albert (yellow card) 73'	Report	Try: George Thornton 2'; Luke White 40+3'; Penalty try 43'; Chris Mattina 63'; Matai Leuta 74'; Con: Luke Carty (3/4) 3', 40+4', 64'	Referee: Kahlil Harrison (USAR) Assistants: Jono Cooper (USAR) & Brian Dusablon (USAR) TMO: Austin Reed (USAR) Man of the Match: Robbie Povey (Houston Sabercats)

May 27	(1 BP) Utah Warriors	28–12	Rugby ATL	Zions Bank Stadium
19:30 MDT	Try: Joseph Mano 6'; Joel Hodgson 18'; Calvin Whiting 47'; Tomasi Tonga 80'; Con: Caleb Makene (3/3) 7', 19', 48'; Joel Hodgson (1/1) 80+1'; Pen: Caleb Makene (0/1)	Report	Try: Jack Shaw 30'; Justin Basson 51'; Con: Chris Hilsenbeck (1/2) 52'	Attendance: 4,560; Referee: Scott Green (USAR) Assistants: Marquise Goodwin (USAR) & Justin Canova (USAR) TMO: Nick Hannon (USAR) Man of the Match: Onehunga Havili (Utah Warriors)

May 28	(1 BP) San Diego Legion	36–13	Rugby New York	Snapdragon Stadium
13:00 PDT	Try: Mike Te'o 5'; Sama Malolo 33'; Fakaʻosi Pifeleti 39'; Richard Judd (2) 56', 79'; Tomas Aoake 74'; Con: Will Hooley (2/4) 34', 57'; Luke Burton (1/2) 80'	Report	Try: Brooklyn Hardaker 47'; Jason Emery 71'; Con: Jason Emery (0/1); Sam Windsor (0/1); Pen: Jason Emery (1/2) 23'	Attendance: 8,926; Referee: Joe James (RFU) Assistants: Jack Gohl (USAR) & Alexis Alfaro (USAR) TMO: Derek Summers (USAR) Man of the Match: Richard Judd (San Diego Legion)

Bye/s: Dallas Jackals, New Orleans Gold

==== Week 16 (June 2–4) ====
June 2	Rugby ATL	14–35	New England Free Jacks (1 BP)	Silverbacks Park
19:00 EDT	Try: Martini Talapusi 23'; Justin Basson 53'; Con: Chris Hilsenbeck (1/1) 24'; Kurt Coleman (1/1) 54'; Pen: Chris Hilsenbeck (0/1); Cards: Will Leonard (yellow card) 68'	Report	Try: Kieran McClea (2) 16', 50'; Paula Balekana 29'; Reece MacDonald 64'; Cam Davidowicz 79'; Con: Jayson Potroz (4/4) 17', 30', 51', 65'; Automatic conversion 79'	Referee: Joe James (RFU) Assistants: Cisco Lopez (USAR) & Dave Edwards (USAR) TMO: Mike Lash (NZR) Man of the Match: Reece MacDonald (New England Free Jacks)

June 3	New Orleans Gold	15–28	Old Glory DC (1 BP)	The Gold Mine
17:00 CDT	Try: Reece Botha 3'; Penalty try 70'; Con: Reece Botha (0/1); Pen: Reece Botha (1/2) 25'; Cards: Sean Paranihi (yellow card) 37'	Report	Try: Niko Jones 6'; Peni Lasaqa 12'; Nic Souchon 18'; Kyle Baillie 65'; Marcos Young 71'; Con: Joaquín Díaz Bonilla (0/3); Gradyn Bowd (0/2); Pen: Joaquín Díaz Bonilla (1/2) 38'; Drop: Joaquín Díaz Bonilla (0/1); Cards: Niko Jones (yellow card) 70'	Referee: Federico Anselmi (UAR) Assistants: Allen Alongi (USAR) & Rob Halcomb (USAR) TMO: Austin Reed (USAR) Man of the Match: Kyle Baillie (Old Glory DC)

June 3	(1 BP) Toronto Arrows	26–48	Houston Sabercats (1 BP)	York Lions Stadium
19:00 EDT	Try: Ramón Ayarza 15'; Owain Ruttan (2) 51', 64'; Jack McRogers 79'; Con: Shane O'Leary (1/2) 52'; Automatic conversion 64'; Peter Nelson (1/1) 79'	Report	Try: Louritz van der Schyff (2) 4', 7'; Wynand Grassmann 25'; Drew Wild 27'; Christian Dyer 36'; Joe Taufeteʻe 46'; Keni Nasoqeqe 70'; Con: Robbie Povey (4/6) 5', 8', 25', 47'; Automatic conversion 70'; Pen: Robbie Povey (1/1) 59'; Cards: Keni Nasoqeqe (yellow card) 78'	Referee: Chris Assmus (RC) Assistants: Peter Pender (RC) & Clint Lemkus (RC) TMO: Greg Gilliam (USAR) Man of the Match: Louritz van der Schyff (Houston Sabercats)

June 3	Chicago Hounds	14–36	San Diego Legion (1 BP)	SeatGeek Stadium
18:00 CDT	Try: Hugh Roach 7'; LaRome White 76'; Con: Chris Mattina (1/1) 8'; Luke Carty (1/1) 77'; Cards: Maclean Jones (yellow card) 36'	Report	Try: Sama Malolo 21'; Tomas Aoake (2) 39', 42'; Christian Poidevin 53'; Richard Judd 72'; Shilo Klein 80+1'; Con: Will Hooley (1/1) 22'; Josh Henderson (2/5) 40', 80+2'	Attendance: 3,432; Referee: Luke Rogan (USAR) Assistants: Adam Falk (USAR) & Niall Little (USAR) TMO: Mike Lash (NZR) Man of the Match: Christian Poidevin (San Diego Legion)

June 4	(1 BP) Rugby New York	43–14	Dallas Jackals	Mount Vernon Memorial Stadium
15:00 EDT	Try: Pago Haini 24'; Connor Buckley (2) 28', 37'; Ed Fidow 32'; Tevita Langi 51'; Charlie Hewitt 66'; Nick Feakes 74'; Con: Jason Emery (2/5) 25', 52'; Sam Windsor (2/2) 67', 75'; Cards: Brendon O'Connor (yellow card) 79'	Report	Try: Lui Sitama 11'; Conrado Roura 61'; Con: Automatic conversion 11'; Alejandro Torres (1/1) 62'	Referee: Robin Kaluzniak (RC) Assistants: Miles McIvor (USAR) & Marty Steffens (USAR) TMO: Nick Hannon (USAR) Man of the Match: Connor Buckley (Rugby New York)

June 4	Seattle Seawolves	27–20	Utah Warriors (1 BP)	Starfire Stadium
19:30 PDT	Try: Lauina Futi 5'; Samu Manoa 21'; Ben Landry 71'; Con: AJ Alatimu (1/1) 6'; Automatic conversion 21'; Jordan Chait (1/1) 72'; Pen: Jordan Chait (2/2) 44', 63'	Report	Try: Bailey Wilson 18'; Joseph Mano (2) 39', 78'; Con: Caleb Makene (1/3) 40'; Pen: Caleb Makene (1/1) 34'; Cards: Mika Kruse (yellow card) 46'	Referee: Scott Green (USAR) Assistants: Brad Schwalger (RC) & Saro Turner (RC) TMO: Derek Summers (USAR) Man of the Match: Ben Landry (Seattle Seawolves)

==== Week 17 (June 9–11) ====
June 9	(1 BP) Houston Sabercats	31–7	Old Glory DC	SaberCats Stadium
20:00 CDT	Try: Christian Dyer (2) 1', 8'; Davey Coetzer 17'; Wynand Grassmann 57'; Vereniki Tikoisolomone 79'; Con: Davey Coetzer (2/4) 9', 58'; Robbie Povey (1/1) 80'; Cards: Gideon van Wyk (yellow card) 12'; Danny Barrett (red card) 65'	Report	Try: Penalty try 12'	Referee: Joe James (RFU) Assistants: Blair McClure (USAR) & Jono Cooper (USAR) TMO: Greg Gilliam (USAR) Man of the Match: Davey Coetzer (Houston Sabercats)

June 10	(1 BP) Dallas Jackals	10–15	New Orleans Gold	Choctaw Stadium
17:00 CDT	Try: Tomás Baravalle 49'; Con: Alejandro Torres (1/1) 50'; Pen: Alejandro Torres (1/2) 17'; Cards: Jerónimo Gómez Vara (yellow card) 39'	Report	Try: Aaron Matthews 25'; Maciu Koroi 40'; Con: Reece Botha (1/2) 40'; Pen: Damian Stevens (1/1) 34'	Referee: Mike Lash (NZR) Assistants: Andrew Low (USAR) & Jono Cooper (USAR) TMO: Nick Hannon (USAR) Man of the Match: Dougie Fife (New Orleans Gold)

June 10	Rugby ATL	24–39	Rugby New York (1 BP)	Silverbacks Park
20:00 EDT	Try: Te Rangatira Waitokia 32'; Sidney Tobias 47'; Penalty try 61'; Con: Chris Hilsenbeck (2/2) 33', 48'; Pen: Chris Hilsenbeck (1/1) 17'	Report	Try: Brooklyn Hardaker (2) 1', 37'; Dylan Fawsitt 28'; Jason Emery 50'; Kara Pryor 62'; Con: Jason Emery (3/4) 2', 29', 51'; Sam Windsor (1/1) 63'; Pen: Jason Emery (1/1) 21'; Sam Windsor (1/2) 68'; Cards: Pago Haini (yellow card) 10'; Brendon O'Connor (yellow card) 40'; Kara Pryor (yellow card) 46'; Nic Mayhew (yellow card) 61'	Referee: Federico Anselmi (UAR) Assistants: Dave Edwards (USAR) & Bryan Hall (USAR) TMO: Greg Gilliam (USAR) Man of the Match: Dylan Fawsitt (Rugby New York)

June 10	(1 BP) Utah Warriors	24–26	Chicago Hounds (1 BP)	Zions Bank Stadium
20:00 MDT	Try: Thomas Tu’avao 22'; Joel Hodgson 38'; Lance Williams 64'; Con: Joel Hodgson (2/2) 23', 65'; Automatic conversion 38'; Pen: Joel Hodgson (1/1) 45'	Report	Try: Julián Domínguez (3) 2', 28', 80+1'; Dinesvaran Krishnan 46'; Con: Luke Carty (2/3) 3', 29'; Chris Mattina (1/1) 80+2'; Cards: Dinesvaran Krishnan (yellow card) 57'	Referee: Cisco Lopez (USAR) Assistants: Kahlil Harrison (USAR) & Kage Green (USAR) TMO: Nick Hannon (USAR) Man of the Match: Julián Domínguez (Chicago Hounds)

June 11	Toronto Arrows	17–50	San Diego Legion (1 BP)	York Lions Stadium
16:00 EDT	Try: Lucas Rumball 32'; Will Grant 40+2'; Con: Shane O'Leary (2/2) 33', 40+3'; Pen: Shane O'Leary (1/1) 38'; Cards: Isaac Salmon (yellow card) 68'	Report	Try: Shilo Klein 17'; Nate Augspurger 41'; Tomas Aoake (2) 50', 73'; Tupou Afungia 54'; Richard Judd 64'; Tiaan Loots 69'; Luke Burton 76'; Con: Will Hooley (2/4) 18', 51'; Luke Burton (3/4) 65', 70', 74'; Cards: Nathan Sylvia (yellow card) 80'	Referee: Kat Roche (USAR) Assistants: Peter Pender (RC) & Clint Lemkus (RC) TMO: Andrew Hosie (RC) Man of the Match: Tomas Aoake (San Diego Legion)

June 11	(1 BP) Seattle Seawolves	26–34	New England Free Jacks (1 BP)	Starfire Stadium
19:30 PDT	Try: Dan Kriel 25'; Tavite Lopeti 60'; Peter Malcolm (2) 66', 78'; Con: AJ Alatimu (3/4) 26', 61', 67'	Report	Try: Andrew Quattrin 19'; Paula Balekana 35'; Sam Fischli 43'; Ethan Fryer 74'; Con: Jayson Potroz (4/4) 20', 36', 44', 75'; Pen: Jayson Potroz (2/2) 40', 53'	Referee: Luke Rogan (USAR) Assistants: Brad Schwalger (RC) & Saro Turner (RC) TMO: Derek Summers (USAR) Man of the Match: Jayson Potroz (New England Free Jacks)

==== Week 18 (June 17–18) ====
June 17	(2 BP) Dallas Jackals	28–29	Chicago Hounds	Choctaw Stadium
17:00 CDT	Try: Marcos Moroni 24'; Danny Christensen 26'; Penalty try (2) 58', 71'; Con: Alejandro Torres (1/1) 25'; Automatic conversion 26'; Pen: Marcos Moroni (0/2); Cards: Conrado Roura (red card) 47'; Adriaan Booysen (red card) 47'	Report	Try: Paddy Ryan 7'; Maclean Jones 14'; Con: Luke Carty (2/2) 8', 15'; Pen: Luke Carty (2/3) 43', 50'; Chris Mattina (3/3) 63', 66', 77'; Drop: Luke Carty (0/1); Cards: Tinashe Muchena (yellow card) 25'; Maclean Jones (red card) 47'; Lindsey Stevens (red card) 47'; Cam Dodson (red card) 47'; Lindsey Stevens (yellow card) 53'; Mika Felix (yellow card) 70'; Dinesvaran Krishnan (yellow card) 71'	Referee: Scott Green (USAR) Assistants: Justin Hale (USAR) & Andrew Low (USAR) TMO: Nick Hannon (USAR) Man of the Match: Chris Mattina (Chicago Hounds)

June 17	(1 BP) Old Glory DC	36–28	Rugby ATL (1 BP)	Segra Field
19:00 EDT	Try: Doug Fraser 8'; Junior Sa'u 31'; Jack Iscaro 36'; Tevita Naqali 40'; Peni Lasaqa 48'; John Rizzo 70'; Con: Gradyn Bowd (3/5) 32', 37', 49'; William Talataina (0/1); Cards: Nic Souchon (yellow card) 12'	Report	Try: Matt Heaton 17'; Nolan Taumoheloa 21'; Niall Saunders 25'; Nahuel Milán 55'; Con: Automatic conversion 17'; Duncan van Schalkwyk (2/2) 22', 26'; Kurt Coleman (1/1) 56'; Cards: Alex Maughan (yellow card) 29'	Referee: Chris Assmus (RC) Assistants: Aaron Davis (USAR) & Craig Sakowski (USAR) TMO: Luke Rogan (USAR) Man of the Match: Junior Sa'u (Old Glory DC)

June 17	(1 BP) Toronto Arrows	24–26	New Orleans Gold (1 BP)	York Lions Stadium
19:00 EDT	Try: Mitch Richardson 3'; James O'Neill 74'; Liam Bowman 80+2'; Con: Shane O'Leary (2/2) 4', 75'; Automatic conversion 80+2'; Pen: Shane O'Leary (1/3) 15'	Report	Try: Tom Florence (2) 40+4', 57'; Harley Wheeler 46'; Alex Lopeti 65'; Con: Jordan Trainor (2/3) 40+5', 58'; Automatic conversion 65'	Referee: Lex Weiner (USAR) Assistants: Clint Lemkus (RC) & Stephen Stothers-Robertson (RC) TMO: Greg Gilliam (USAR) Man of the Match: Tom Florence (New Orleans Gold)

June 18	(1 BP) New England Free Jacks	47–24	Houston Sabercats	Veterans Memorial Stadium
13:30 EDT	Try: Le Roux Malan (3) 12', 16', 47'; Paula Balekana 31'; Wian Conradie (2) 53', 78'; John Poland 59'; Con: Reece MacDonald (6/7) 13', 32', 48', 54', 60', 79'; Cards: Wian Conradie (yellow card) 24'; Mitch Jacobson (yellow card) 69'	Report	Try: Danny Barrett 25'; Kainoa Lloyd 67'; Nick Boyer 74'; Con: Kian Meadon (3/3) 26', 68', 75'; Pen: Kian Meadon (1/1) 40+1'; Cards: Wynand Grassmann (yellow card) 69'	Attendance: 4,758; Referee: Federico Anselmi (UAR) Assistants: Amelia Luciano (USAR) & Mike Rudzinsky (USAR) TMO: Luke Rogan (USAR) Man of the Match: Le Roux Malan (New England Free Jacks)

June 18	(1 BP) Rugby New York	33–43	Utah Warriors (1 BP)	Mount Vernon Memorial Stadium
15:00 EDT	Try: Brendon O'Connor 11'; Dylan Fawsitt 27'; Jason Emery 36'; Ishmail Shabazz 49'; DaQuan Perry 70'; Con: Sam Windsor (3/4) 12', 28', 50'; Automatic conversion 70'; Cards: Charlie Hewitt (yellow card) 5'; Nick Feakes (yellow card) 77'	Report	Try: Henry Bell 5'; Cliven Loubser (2) 18', 33'; Joel Hodgson 42'; Calvin Whiting 45'; Jurie van Vuuren 65'; Jesse Hamilton 80'; Con: Joel Hodgson (4/7) 34', 43', 46', 66'; Pen: Saia Uhila (yellow card) 35'	Referee: Joe James (RFU) Assistants: Miles McIvor (USAR) & Marty Steffens (USAR) TMO: Greg Gilliam (USAR) Man of the Match: Ishmail Shabazz (Rugby New York)

June 18	(1 BP) San Diego Legion	40–19	Seattle Seawolves	Snapdragon Stadium
16:00 PDT	Try: Finn Kearns 10'; Mike Te'o 32'; Jason Higgins (2) 39', 69'; Josh Henderson 49'; Ryan Matyas 52'; Con: Josh Henderson (5/6) 11', 33', 40', 50', 70'; Cards: Blair Cowan (red card) 45'		Try: Devereaux Ferris 26'; Tavite Lopeti 34'; Jeremiah Sio 65'; Con: Devereaux Ferris (1/2) 27'; Karl Keane (1/1) 66'; Cards: Ben Mitchell (yellow card) 51'	Referee: Mike Lash (NZR) Assistants: Jack Gohl (USAR) & Marquise Goodwin (USAR) TMO: Nick Hannon (USAR) Man of the Match: Jason Higgins (San Diego Legion)

== Championship Series ==
=== Bracket ===
Eliminators
2	Seattle Seawolves	37
3	Houston Sabercats	26
2	Rugby New York	33
3	Old Glory DC	37

Conference Finals
1	San Diego Legion	32
2	Seattle Seawolves	10
1	New England Free Jacks	25
3	Old Glory DC	7

Final
1	San Diego Legion	24
1	New England Free Jacks	25

=== Eliminators (June 24–25) ===
June 24	Seattle Seawolves	37–26	Houston SaberCats	Starfire Stadium
15:00 PDT	Try: Charles Elton 30'; Adriaan Carelse 40'; Riekert Hattingh 68'; Juan-Philip Smith 78'; Con: AJ Alatimu (3/3) 31', 69', 79'; Automatic conversion 40'; Pen: AJ Alatimu (3/3) 23', 42', 49'; Cards: Sam Matenga (yellow card) 25'	Report	Try: Dom Akina 27'; Davey Coetzer 51'; Gideon van Wyk 60'; Louritz van der Schyff 80+1'; Con: Davey Coetzer (3/3) 28', 52', 60'; Danny Barrett (0/1); Drop: Gerrie Labuschagné (0/1)	Referee: Joe James (RFU) Assistants: Luke Rogan (USAR) & Austin Reed (USAR) TMO: Nick Hannon (USAR) Man of the Match: Riekert Hattingh (Seattle Seawolves)

June 25	Rugby New York	33–37	Old Glory DC	Mount Vernon Memorial Stadium
18:00 EDT	Try: Faʻasui Fuatai 1'; Penalty try 27'; Dylan Fawsitt (2) 33', 51'; DaQuan Perry 80'; Con: Sam Windsor (3/4) 34', 51', 80+1'; Cards: Sam Davies (yellow card) 66'; Tevita Langi (yellow card) 67'	Report	Try: William Talataina 4'; Kyle Baillie 57'; Penalty try 67'; Kurt Baker 78'; Con: Joaquín Díaz Bonilla (3/3) 5', 58', 79'; Pen: Joaquín Díaz Bonilla (3/3) 8', 21', 38'; Cards: Kyle Baillie (yellow card) 27'; Lautaro Bavaro (yellow card) 33'	Attendance: 1,300; Referee: Federico Anselmi (UAR) Assistants: Chris Assmus (RC) & Cisco Lopez (USAR) TMO: Derek Summers (USAR) Man of the Match: Joaquín Díaz Bonilla (Old Glory DC)

=== Conference finals (July 1–2) ===
July 1	New England Free Jacks	25–7	Old Glory DC	Veterans Memorial Stadium
17:30 EDT	Try: Le Roux Malan 4'; Andrew Quattrin 12'; Taniela Filimone 64'; Con: Automatic conversion 4'; Jayson Potroz (1/2) 65'; Pen: Jayson Potroz (2/2) 18', 40+3'	Report	Try: Thretton Palamo 72'; Con: Joaquín Díaz Bonilla (1/1) 73'	Attendance: 3,414; Referee: Joe James (RFU) Assistants: Federico Anselmi (UAR) & Peter Pender (RC) TMO: Chris Assmus (RC) Man of the Match: Mitch Jacobson (New England Free Jacks)

July 2	San Diego Legion	32–10	Seattle Seawolves	Snapdragon Stadium
15:00 PDT	Try: Fakaʻosi Pifeleti 25'; Tomas Aoake (2) 57', 67'; Marcel Brache 62'; Con: Will Hooley (2/3) 26, 58'; Automatic conversion 62'; Pen: Will Hooley (1/1) 23'; Drop: Ma'a Nonu (1/1) 11'; Cards: Nathan Sylvia (yellow card) 65'	Report	Try: Ben Landry 65'; Con: Jordan Chait (1/1) 66'; Pen: Jordan Chait (1/1) 39'	Referee: Cam Stone (NZR) Assistants: Luke Rogan (USAR) & Kahlil Harrison (USAR) TMO: Chris Assmus (RC) Man of the Match: Ma'a Nonu (San Diego Legion)

=== Championship final (July 8) ===
July 8	San Diego Legion	24-25	New England Free Jacks	SeatGeek Stadium
14:00, CDT	Try: Christian Poidevin 9′ Nate Augspurger (2) 29′, 60′ Con: Will Hooley (3/3) 10′, 30′, 61′ Pen: Will Hooley (1/1) 40’+2′ Josh Henderson (0/1); Drop: Ma'a Nonu (0/1)	Report	Try: Mitch Jacobson 4′ Paula Balekana 45′ Le Roux Malan 76′ Con: Jayson Potroz (2/3) 5′, 46′ Pen: Jayson Potroz (2/2) 14′, 18′	Attendance: 10,103; Referee: Joe James (RFU) Assistants: Cam Stone (NZR) & Lex Weiner (USAR) TMO: Nick Hannon (USAR) Man of the Match: Jayson Potroz (New England Free Jacks)

== Player statistics ==
=== Top scorers ===
The top ten try and point scorers during the 2023 Major League Rugby season are:

Last updated: July 11, 2023

Most tries
No	Player	Team	Tries
1	(Fiji) Paula Balekana	New England Free Jacks	15
2	(American Samoa) Joseph Mano	Utah Warriors	14
3	(United States) Riekert Hattingh	Seattle Seawolves	12
4	(New Zealand) Tomas Aoaki	San Diego Legion	11
4	(United States) Nate Augspurger	San Diego Legion	11
4	(South Africa) Gideon van Wyk	Houston SaberCats	11
7	(United States) Dylan Fawsitt	Rugby New York	10
7	(Samoa) William Talataina	Old Glory DC	10
9	(United States) Christian Dyer	Houston SaberCats	9
9	(American Samoa) Lauina Futi	Seattle Seawolves	9
9	(Namibia) Le Roux Malan	New England Free Jacks	9

Most points
No	Player	Team	Pts
1	(New Zealand) Jayson Potroz	New England Free Jacks	146
2	(South Africa) Davey Coetzer	Houston SaberCats	135
3	(England) Joel Hodgson	Utah Warriors	122
4	(Samoa) AJ Alatimu	Seattle Seawolves	100
5	(Argentina) Joaquín Díaz Bonilla	Old Glory DC	96
6	(United States) Will Hooley	San Diego Legion	89
7	(South Africa) Jordan Chait	Seattle Seawolves	77
7	(Samoa) Rodney Iona	New Orleans Gold	77
9	(Fiji) Paula Balekana	New England Free Jacks	75
10	(New Zealand) Jason Emery	Rugby New York	73

MLR awards the try scorer 7 points when there is an Automatic Conversion (The ball is touched down between the post in the in-goal area).

=== Sanctions ===
Last updated: May 11, 2023

Player	Team	Red	Yellow
(South Africa) Tiaan Eramsus	Rugby ATL	0	1
(Australia) Luke Beauchamp	Chicago Hounds	0	1
(Tonga) Saia Uhila	Utah Warriors	0	3
(Canada) Andrew Coe	Rugby New York	0	2
(South Africa) Rhyno Herbst	Seattle Seawolves	0	1
(Canada) Travis Larsen	Toronto Arrows	0	1
(Tonga) Tupou Afungia	San Diego Legion	0	1
(Argentina) Martín Elías	Dallas Jackals	1	0
(United States) Alex Maughan	Rugby ATL	0	2
(New Zealand) Tom Florence	New Orleans Gold	0	1
(United States) Lance Williams	Utah Warriors	0	1
(Canada) Emerson Prior	Utah Warriors	0	1
(Canada) Djustice Sears-Duru	San Diego Legion	0	1
(Australia) Christian Poidevin	San Diego Legion	0	1
(New Zealand) Teihorangi Walden	Rugby New York	0	1
(United States) Pago Haini	Rugby New York	0	1
(Canada) Conor Keys	New England Free Jacks	0	2
(New Zealand) Jesse Parete	New England Free Jacks	2 (Note: Received 2 yellow cards during game vs Old Glory, March 11 and game vs Rugby ATL, April 22.)	4
(Australia) Maclean Jones	Chicago Hounds	0	1
(Canada) Lucas Rumball	Toronto Arrows	0	1
(Ireland) Noel Reid	Toronto Arrows	0	1
(Canada) James O'Neill	Toronto Arrows	0	1
(United States) Siaosi Mahoni	Houston SaberCats	0	2
(New Zealand) Brendon O'Connor	Rugby New York	0	1
(Fiji) Ratu Veremalua Vugakoto	Utah Warriors	1	0
(New Zealand) Zion Going	Utah Warriors	0	1
(New Zealand) Isaac Ross	San Diego Legion	0	1
(United States) Michael de Waal	Chicago Hounds	0	2
(Scotland) Mitch Eadie	Toronto Arrows	0	1
(Canada) Kobe Faust	Toronto Arrows	0	2
(New Zealand) Kara Pryor	Rugby New York	0	1
(New Zealand) Reece Macdonald	New England Free Jacks	0	2
(England) Thomas Tu’avao	Utah Warriors	0	1
(United States) Martini Talapusi	Rugby ATL	0	1
(South Africa) Dean Muir	Houston SaberCats	0	1
(United States) Asa Carter	Houston SaberCats	0	1
(South Africa) Duncan Matthews	Seattle Seawolves	0	1
(United States) Kaleb Geiger	Rugby New York	0	1
(New Zealand) Ma'a Nonu	San Diego Legion	0	3
(United States) Chris Mattina	Chicago Hounds	0	1
(New Zealand) Faʻasui Fuatai	Rugby New York	0	1
(South Africa) Johan Momsen	Rugby ATL	0	1
(New Zealand) Rewita Biddle	Rugby ATL	0	1
(New Zealand) Te Rangatira Waitokia	Rugby ATL	0	1
(South Africa) Wynand Grassmann	Houston SaberCats	0	1
(United States) Bailey Wilson	Utah Warriors	0	1
(Canada) Peter Nelson	Toronto Arrows	0	1
(Canada) Dawson Fatoric	Toronto Arrows	0	1
(South Africa) Gideon van Wik	Houston SaberCats	1	0
(Argentina) Conrado Roura	Dallas Jackals	0	1
(South Africa) JP du Plessis	New Orleans Gold	0	1
(American Samoa) Joseph Mano	Utah Warriors	0	1
(Argentina) Alejo Daireaux	Old Glory DC	0	1
(Canada) Kyle Baillie	Old Glory DC	0	1
(England) Joel Hodgson	Utah Warriors	0	1
(Canada) Liam Murray	Dallas Jackals	0	1
(Argentina) Alejandro Torres	Dallas Jackals	0	1
(Argentina) Juan Pablo Zeiss	Dallas Jackals	0	1
(Fiji) Jale Vakaloloma	San Diego Legion	0	1
(Fiji) Filimona Waqainabete	San Diego Legion	0	1
(Samoa) Rodney Iona	New Orleans Gold	0	1
(United States) Isaia Lotawa	Seattle Seawolves	0	1
(United States) Jake Turnbull	Seattle Seawolves	0	1
(Argentina) Lucas Bur	Dallas Jackals	0	1
(Argentina) Jerónimo Gómez Vara	Dallas Jackals	0	1
(Australia) Charlie Abel	Chicago Hounds	0	1
(United States) Langilangi Haupeakui	Old Glory DC	0	1
(Australia) Ben Grant	San Diego Legion	0	1
(United States) Mike Te'o	San Diego Legion	0	1

== End of Season Awards ==
Award	Player	Team	Position	Ref.
Coach of the Year	Josh Syms	Old Glory DC	Head coach	
Player of the Year	Jayson Potroz	New England Free Jacks	Fly-half	
Rookie of the Year	Sam Golla	Dallas Jackals	Lock	
Back of the Year	Nate Augspurger	San Diego Legion	Scrum-half	
Forward of the Year	Wian Conradie	New England Free Jacks	Flanker	
S. Marcus Calloway Community Impact	Daniel Kriel	Seattle Seawolves	Centre	
