= Charlie Hewitt =

Charlie Hewitt may refer to:

- Charlie Hewitt (footballer)
- Charlie Hewitt (rugby union)
- Charlie Hewitt (artist)
- Sheriff Hoyt, a character in Texas Chainsaw Massacre also known as Charlie Hewitt

== See also ==
- Charles Hewitt (disambiguation)
