= China Lions =

- Union: China Rugby Football Association; Bay of Plenty Rugby Union
- League: Global Rapid Rugby

The China Lions was a professional rugby union team that was formed in 2020 to compete in the Global Rapid Rugby competition across the Asia-Pacific region. It is a joint venture between the China Rugby Football Association and New Zealand's Bay of Plenty Rugby Union.

== History ==
For their first season in 2020 the Lions intended to host three of their home games in China at Shanghai and two in New Zealand at the Rotorua International Stadium. Due to health concerns relating to the COVID-19 pandemic, however, the Lions only played one match in the schedule, a 29–22 away win over the Fijian Latui in Suva.

== Records ==
=== Head coaches ===
- Mike Rogers (2020)

=== Captains ===
- Hugh Blake (2020)

=== Squads ===
China Lions – 2020 Global Rapid Rugby (Note: The initial 35-man squad was named in March 2020.)

Hooker
- (New Zealand) Greg Pleasants-Tate
- (New Zealand) Nic Souchon
Prop
- (New Zealand) Nico Aandewiel
- (New Zealand) Haereiti Hetet
- (New Zealand) Tevita Mafileo
- (New Zealand) Solomona Sakalia
- (New Zealand) Tevita Sole
- (New Zealand) Apitoni Toia
- (New Zealand) Pasilio Tosi
Lock
- (China) **Li Haitao**
- (New Zealand) Iosefa Maloney-Fiaola
- (New Zealand) Ray Tatafu
- (Netherlands) Stan van den Hoven
Backrow
- (Scotland) **Hugh Blake** (c)
- (New Zealand) Kohan Herbert
- (New Zealand) Joe Johnston
- (China) **Liu Luda**
- (New Zealand) Hoani Matenga
- (New Zealand) Abraham Papali'i
- (China) **Gao Yinghao**
Halfback
- (Canada) **Luke Campbell**
- (New Zealand) Leroy Carter
- (New Zealand) Te Aihe Toma
Five-eighth
- (New Zealand) Dan Hollinshead
- (New Zealand) Solofa Silipa
- (New Zealand) Dwayne Sweeney
Centre
- (New Zealand) Joe Johnston
- (New Zealand) James Little
- (New Zealand) Mathew Skipwith-Garland
Wing
- (New Zealand) Declan Barnett
- (Australia) Tyler Campbell
- (China) **Dan Changshun**
- (New Zealand) Fa'asiu Fuatai
Fullback
- (New Zealand) Pryor Collier
- (New Zealand) Liam Coombes-Fabling

Notes:

Bold denotes player is internationally capped. (c) Denotes team captain. ^{1} denotes marquee player.

== See also ==
- Rugby union in China
