= Gradyn Bowd =

Canada international rugby union player

- Born: 27 August 1992 (age 34) Red Deer, Alberta, Canada
- Height: 178 cm (5 ft 10 in)
- Weight: 98 kg (216 lb; 15 st 6 lb)

Rugby union career
- Position: Fly-half
- Current team: Old Glory DC
Senior career
Years	Team	Apps	(Points)
2023–	Old Glory DC	2	(0)
- Correct as of 20 March 2023
International career
Years	Team	Apps	(Points)
2012	Canada U20		
2019–	Canada	10	(4)
- Correct as of 20 March 2023

Gradyn Bowd (born 27 August 1992) is a Canadian rugby union player, currently playing for Old Glory DC in Major League Rugby (MLR). His preferred position is fly-half.

== Early career ==
Bowd is from Red Deer, Alberta and played a multitude of sports as a young athlete before studying at the University of Victoria where he captained the rugby team for four seasons.

Bowd has played for a number of clubs in Canada, and played in Australia for Sunnybank in Brisbane.

== Professional career ==
Bowd signed for Old Glory DC, his first experience of full-time professional rugby, ahead of the 2023 Major League Rugby season.

Bowd made his international debut for Canada in 2016, against Uruguay. He would go on to win a further 7 caps, but would then not feature again for the side until 2022 when he was called up to the squad for the 2022 end-of-year rugby union internationals.
