= Nic Souchon =

New Zealander rugby union player

- Full name: Nic Souchon
- Born: 13 August 1997 (age 29) Paeroa, New Zealand
- Height: 180 cm (5 ft 11 in)
- Weight: 220 lb (100 kg; 15 st 10 lb)
- School: Hamilton Boys' High School
- University: Lincoln University
- Occupation: Rugby player

Rugby union career
- Position: Hooker (rugby union)
Youth career
- Chiefs Under-18s
- –: Canterbury Under-19s
- –: Cantabrians Under-20s
- –: New Zealand Universities
Senior career
Years	Team	Apps	(Points)
2018	Lincs		
2019	Otago		
2020	China Lions		
2020/2022	Bay of Plenty	4	(0)
2023	Old Glory DC	17	(35)
2023-present	Southland	14	(10)
2024	Utah	15	(20)
2025	Hurricanes	1	(0)
2025–2026	Ricoh Black Rams	2	(0)

Nic Souchon (born 13 August 1997) is a New Zealand professional rugby union player who currently plays for Old Glory DC in Major League Rugby (MLR).

== Early life ==
During high school, Souchon attended Hamilton Boys High School, and achieved and undergraduate degree from Lincoln University.

== Career ==
During his career with the Bay of Plenty, Souchon made his way to the New Zealand National Provincial Championship.

In December 2022, following his success, Souchon signed to Old Glory DC for the 2023 MLR season.
