= Iñaki Ayarza =

Chilean rugby union player

- Full name: Iñaki Ayarza Saporta
- Born: 7 September 1999 (age 27) Santiago, Chile
- Height: 1.86 m (6 ft 1 in)
- Weight: 102 kg (225 lb; 16 st 1 lb)
- Notable relative: Ramón Ayarza (brother)

Rugby union career
- Position(s): Fullback, Wing, Centre
- Current team: RC Vannes
Youth career
- 20??-2018: PWCC
- 2018-2020: Bayonne
Senior career
Years	Team	Apps	(Points)
2020-2021	Bayonne	0	(0)
2020	→ Anglet (loan)	2	(0)
2021–2024	Soyaux Angoulême	59	(55)
2024–	RC Vannes	9	(10)
- Correct as of 6 April 2025
International career
Years	Team	Apps	(Points)
2019–	Chile	18	(20)
- Correct as of 10 September 2023

Iñaki Ayarza Saporta (born 7 September 1999) is a Chilean professional rugby union player who plays as a fullback for Pro D2 club RC Vannes and the Chile national team.

== Club career ==
Ayarza began his career at PWCC in Santiago, he joined Bayonne espoirs in 2018, he never made his debut for the senior side however did feature for their Sevens side. He spent time on loan at Fédérale 1 side Anglet Olympique.

In 2021 he joined then Nationale side Soyaux Angoulême XV helping them gain promotion to the ProD2. He moved to RC Vannes ahead of the 2024-25 season although had interest from Top 14 club Montpellier.

== International career ==
Ayarza debuted for Chile in 2019 against Paraguay, scoring on debut. He was named in the Chile squad for the 2023 Rugby World Cup. He made his Rugby World Cup debut at the Stadium de Toulouse against Japan, starting at fullback in the 42–12 loss.
