= Robbie Povey =

Canadian rugby union player

- Born: 21 September 1996 (age 30) Oxford, England
- Height: 6 ft 0 in (1.83 m)
- Weight: 200 lb (91 kg; 14 st 4 lb)
- School: Rugby School
- University: Oxford Brookes University

Rugby union career
- Position(s): Fly half, Fullback
- Current team: Houston Sabercats
Amateur team(s)
Years	Team	Apps	(Points)
2017	Bedford Athletic		
2019	Sale FC		
Senior career
Years	Team	Apps	(Points)
2018–19	Coventry		
2020	Utah Warriors	4	(10)
2021–2023	Houston Sabercats	33	(73)
2024–	Utah Warriors		
Provincial / State sides
Years	Team	Apps	(Points)
2017-	Prairie Wolf Pack		
International career
Years	Team	Apps	(Points)
2016	Canada U20		
2017-	Canada	11	(21)

Robert Povey (born 21 September 1996) is an English-born Canadian rugby union player who plays as a flyhalf for the Utah Warriors in Major League Rugby (MLR).

He played for the Prairie Wolf Pack in the Canadian Rugby Championship and Canada.

== Club statistics ==
As of 9 February 2022

Season	Team	Games	Starts	Sub	Tries	Cons	Pens	Drops	Points	Yel	Red
MLR 2020	Utah Warriors	4	3	1	0	5	0	0	10	0	0
MLR 2021	Houston Sabercats	12	9	3	5	0	0	0	25	0	0
MLR 2022	Houston Sabercats	0	0	0	0	0	0	0	0	0	0
MLR 2023	Houston Sabercats	0	0	0	0	0	0	0	0	0	0
MLR 2024	Utah Warriors	0	0	0	0	0	0	0	0	0	0
Total		16	12	4	5	5	0	0	35	0	0
