= Joe Johnston (rugby union) =

New Zealand rugby union player

- Born: 31 January 1998 (age 28) New Zealand
- Height: 1.87 m (6 ft 1 1/2 in)
- Weight: 101 kg (15.9 st; 223 lb)

Rugby union career
- Position: Flanker
Senior career
Years	Team	Apps	(Points)
2019–	Bay of Plenty	36	(55)
2021–	New England Free Jacks	74	(50)
2022-2023	Waikato Mooloos	7	
- Correct as of 6 August 2026

Joe Johnston (born 31 January 1998) is a New Zealand rugby union player, currently playing for the New England Free Jacks of Major League Rugby (MLR). His preferred position is flanker.

Johnston has earned the nickname "the mechanic" for his workmanlike and dogged performances on the field along with his tackling abilities.

== Early career ==
Johnston attended Kings College for his last two years of High School in 2015 and 2016. Johnston made an immediate impact at the historically strong school team, helping the Auckland Boys’ School to a top four national finish in 2015 and captaining the side in his final year. Johnston's performances caught national attention and in 2016 he earned selection for and captained the New Zealand Schools Barbarians side that won the Trans-Tasman shield.

== Professional career ==
Johnston signed for Major League Rugby side New England Free Jacks ahead of the 2021 Major League Rugby season. He had previously represented Bay of Plenty in the 2019 and 2020 seasons of the Mitre 10 Cup, while he was also selected to play for the China Lions in the 2020 Global Rapid Rugby season.

During the 2021 season Johnston would start all 14 games he appeared in for the Free Jacks scoring three tries. The following year during the 2022 season he appeared in 17 games starting 13 and once again scored three tries, as he and the Free Jacks reached the MLR eastern conference semifinals.

Then during the 2023 season Johnston would appear in 17 games making 10 starts for the Free Jacks scoring 2 tries. Being a key part of helping the team win their first ever MLR championship over San Diego 25-24. He would then join Waikato in the National Provincial Championship (NPC) to finish out the 2023 season.

After taking time off from Rugby to finish his degree, he would return to the sport in the 2024 season. Johnston joined Bay of Plenty starting 11 games in 12 appearances scoring 8 tries and helping them get all the way to the NPC final where they would ultimately to fall to Wellington.

In 2025 he would rejoin the Free Jacks after missing the penalty season and claimed his 50th cap for the team on February 3. Captaining the team Johnston would help the free jacks win their 3rd straight MLR championship appearing in 19 games making 17 starts and scoring 2 tries. He also posted 224 successful tackles, while carrying for 362 meters. To finish out the season he returned to Bay of Plenty in the NPC where he would make 12 appearances and 5 starts scoring one try as they lost to Otago in the semifinals.

In 2026, Johnston returned to the Free Jacks once again captaining the club, he made 7 starts for the club but missed three weeks due to a hand injury. He and the Free Jacks missed the postseason. Like previous seasons he once again returned to Bay of Plenty following the end of the MLR season.

== Honours ==
New England Free Jacks

- Major League Rugby Championship: 2x (2023, 2025)

Bay of Plenty

- Mitre 10 Cup Championship Division: (2019)

== Personal life ==
Johnston's mother grew up in Boston and his father played rugby in New England. His brother Alex also plays rugby professionally.

After the 2023 MLR season Johnston made the decision to go back to New Zealand and finished his degree in business management, and worked construction. He would eventually return to the sport playing club rugby and winning the Baywide Championship with Te Puke. This would lead to him going back to pro rugby with Bay of Plenty and his eventual return to the USA.
