= Charles Hewitt =

Charles Hewitt may refer to:

- Charles Hewitt (rower) (born 1949), American Olympic rower
- Charles Gordon Hewitt (1885–1920), Canadian entomologist and conservation biologist
- Charles J. Hewitt (1867–1940), American businessman, banker and politician from New York

== See also ==
- Charlie Hewitt (disambiguation)
- Charles Hewett (1929–2024), American cyclist who competed at the 1960 Summer Olympics
- Charles Thomas Hewett (1794–1871), English-born South Australian pioneer
