= John Poland =

Irish rugby union player (born 1996)

- Born: 21 November 1996 (age 29) Ballinora, County Cork, Ireland
- Height: 1.70 m (5 ft 7 in)
- Weight: 80 kg (13 st; 180 lb)
- School: Presentation Brothers College
- University: University College Cork

Rugby union career
- Position: Scrum-half
- Current team: New England Free Jacks
Amateur team(s)
Years	Team	Apps	(Points)
2001–2015	Sundays Well		
2015–2017	Cork Constitution		
2017–2019	UCC		
2025-	Young Munster		
Senior career
Years	Team	Apps	(Points)
2018	Munster	1	
2019–	New England Free Jacks	64	(122)
2023	Manwatu Turbos	7	(10)
- Correct as of 30 December 2020
International career
Years	Team	Apps	(Points)
2016	Ireland U20	5	(0)
- Correct as of 18 March 2016

John Poland (born 21 November 1996) is an Irish rugby union player. He plays as a scrum-half for the New England Free Jacks in Major League Rugby (MLR) in the United States.

== Early life ==
Born in Ballinora, County Cork, the second eldest of four children, Poland first played rugby for Sundays Well, where his father had also been a player, and attended Presentation Brothers College, captaining the team during the Munster Schools Rugby Senior Cup. He also played hurling and football for Ballinora GAA, where he played on several inter-county development sides. Initially, he played as a fly-half or centre, before converting to scrum-half. Poland has been capped at under-19 and Under-20 level for Ireland, and joined the Munster sub-academy in July 2015.

== Club rugby ==
Poland played his club rugby with Cork Constitution during the 2015–16 and 2016–17 seasons, winning several trophies while there. He moved to UCC ahead of the 2017–18 season and was an integral part of the side that was promoted to the division 1A of the All-Ireland League for the 2018–19 season.

== Professional career ==
=== Munster ===
Poland was an integral part of the Munster A team that won the 2016–17 British and Irish Cup. He was used as a replacement in round 1 against London Welsh, missed the round 3 clash against Rotherham Titans due to exam commitments, was used as a replacement again in round 4 against Rotherham, before starting against Doncaster Knights in the rescheduled round 2 and round 5, Ulster A in the quarter-final, Ealing Trailfinders in the semi-final and Jersey Reds in the final. Poland made his senior competitive debut for Munster on 10 February 2018, coming off the bench in the provinces' 33–5 win against Zebre in the 2017–18 Pro14.

=== New England Free Jacks ===
Poland joined American Major League Rugby side New England Free Jacks in October 2019 upon concluding his degree in finance at University College Cork, in time for the sides inaugural season in 2020. He scored four tries in the 5 regular season games and had 4 try assists. Poland scored a brilliant individual try which was awarded try of the week in week 4. He would help lead the free jacks to their first championship in 2023 scoring 37 points. Then being named to the All MLR second team. He would get injured 3 games into the following season but would still be part of another championship team. Then in 2025 he would win a 3rd straight championship scoring 4 points in 5 appearances.

During the 2023 season Poland would become the first player in Free jacks history to reach 50 caps.

=== Manwatu ===
After the 2023 MLR season John would play in the NPC with the Manwatu Turbos. Making 8 appearances and scoring 2 tries.

== Ireland ==
Poland was capped for Ireland U20 during the 2016 Six Nations Under 20s Championship, earning the Man-of-the-Match award during the sides opening 35–24 loss to Wales U20 on 5 February 2016.

== Honours ==
New England Free Jacks

- Major League Rugby Championship: 3x 2023, 2024, 2025
- All Major League Rugby second team: 2023

=== Munster A ===
- British and Irish Cup:
  - Winner (1): 2016–17

=== Cork Constitution ===
- All-Ireland League Division 1A:
  - Winner (1): 2016–17
- Bateman Cup:
  - Winner (2): 2015–16, 2016–17
- Munster Senior Cup:
  - Winner (2): 2015–16, 2016–17
- All Ireland U20 League:
  - Winner (1): 2016–17

=== University College Cork ===
- All-Ireland League Division 1B:
  - Winner (1): 2017–18
