= Mitch Richardson =

Canadian rugby union player

- Full name: Mitchell Richardson
- Born: June 9, 1996 (age 30) Ontario, Canada
- Height: 6 ft 2 in (188 cm)
- Weight: 205 lb (93 kg)

Rugby union career
- Position: Centre
Senior career
Years	Team	Apps	(Points)
2014–2017	Ontario Blues	??	(??)
2018–2023	Toronto Arrows	38	(40)
2024–	Dallas Jackals	2	(5)
International career
Years	Team	Apps	(Points)
2016	Canada under-20	??	(??)
2017	Canada Universities	??	(??)
2017	Canada A	1	(0)
2023–	Canada	4	(5)

Mitchell Richardson (born June 9, 1996) is a Canadian professional rugby union player.

== Early life ==
A native of Stoney Creek, Ontario, Richardson attended Saltfleet District High School, growing up playing both ice hockey and rugby. He received a contract offer to play junior ice hockey with the Ancaster Avalanche but chose to pursue a rugby career after being invited to try-out for Canada's under-20s rugby side.

== Rugby career ==
Richardson, primarily a centre, started out at his hometown club, the Stoney Creek Camels, then during his studies at McMaster University played rugby for the Marauders. He competed in Major League Rugby with the Toronto Arrows from 2018 to 2023, before being signed by the Dallas Jackals for the 2024 season.

=== International rugby ===
Richardson gained his first cap for Canada against Tonga at Nukuʻalofa's Teufaiva Sport Stadium in 2023.

== See also ==
- List of Canada national rugby union players
