= Rodney Iona =

Samoa international rugby union player

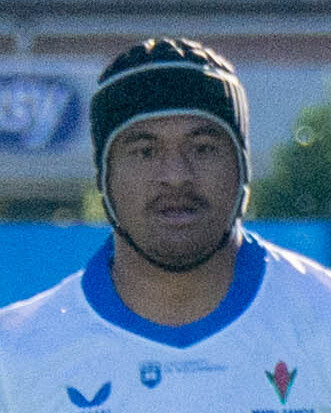
- Full name: Rodney Esekia Iona
- Born: 17 August 1991 (age 35) Melbourne, Victoria, Australia
- Height: 1.77 m (5 ft 10 in)
- Weight: 89 kg (196 lb; 14 st 0 lb)

Rugby union career
- Position: Fly-half
- Current team: NOLA Gold
Senior career
Years	Team	Apps	(Points)
2014–2015	Brumbies	3	(0)
2014–2015	Canberra Vikings	15	(44)
2016–2017	Béziers	22	(0)
2017	Santboiana	1	(0)
2019–2020	Jersey Reds	11	(10)
2022	Brumbies	7	(0)
2023–2024	NOLA Gold	23	(128)
2025	Seattle Seawolves	0	
- Correct as of 20 December 2024
International career
Years	Team	Apps	(Points)
2018–	Samoa	8	(21)
- Correct as of 14 May 2023

Rodney Esekia Iona (born 17 August 1991) is a professional rugby union player who plays as a fly-half for Major League Rugby club Seattle Seawolves in Major League Rugby (MLR). Born in Australia, he represents Samoa at international level after qualifying on eligibility grounds.

== Professional career ==
Originally from Melbourne, Iona made his way north to Australia's capital Canberra in an attempt to forge out a rugby career for himself. In 2011 he linked up with the Tuggeranong Vikings who play in the ACTRU Premier Division while attending the Brumbies academy. He represented the Brumbies at sevens and won the World Club Sevens Championship in 2013 and also played in the World Club 10s tournament in Singapore.

A spate of injuries for the Brumbies in the middle of the 2014 Super Rugby season saw Iona earn his first cap in a derby match against the Waratahs in Sydney. His debut didn't go quite as well as he'd have liked with his first pass being intercepted which resulted in a Waratahs try. Despite this Iona was offered a full-time one-year contract with the Brumbies ahead of the 2015 Super Rugby season.

Iona also played for the Canberra Vikings in the first ever National Rugby Championship in 2014 making 6 appearances.

Iona joined French Rugby Pro D2 side AS Béziers Hérault in July 2016. He made 18 appearances in his first season, but suffered a serious neck injury after just four matches in 2017 that threatened his career. He was released by Béziers and joined Spanish División de Honor de Rugby side UE Santboiana.

== Statistics ==
As of 28 June 2015

Season	Team	Games	Starts	Sub	Mins	Tries	Cons	Pens	Drops	Points	Yel	Red
2014	Brumbies	1	0	1	62	0	0	0	0	0	0	0
2015	Brumbies	2	0	2	51	0	0	0	0	0	0	0
Total		3	0	3	113	0	0	0	0	0	0	0
