= Ramón Ayarza =

Chilean rugby union player (born 1993)

- Born: Jose Ramón Ayarza; 28 August 1993 (age 33) Chile
- Height: 1.86 m (6 ft 1 in)
- Weight: 109 kg (240 lb; 17 st 2 lb)
- Notable relative: Iñaki Ayarza (brother)

Rugby union career
- Position: Prop
Senior career
Years	Team	Apps	(Points)
2015–2016	La Voulte-Valence	12	(0)
2016–2019	Bayonne	23	(10)
2019–2020	Montauban	4	(0)
2020	Anglet	3	(0)
2021–	Selknam	0	(0)
2023–	Toronto Arrows		
- Correct as of 19 June 2023
International career
Years	Team	Apps	(Points)
2012–2013	Chile U20s	6	(0)
2014–	Chile	5	(0)
- Correct as of 1 February 2021

Ramón Ayarza (born 28 August 1993) is a Chilean rugby union player, currently playing for Súper Liga Americana de Rugby side Selknam. His preferred position is prop. He also plays for the Toronto Arrows in Major League Rugby (MLR).

== Professional career ==
Ayarza signed for Súper Liga Americana de Rugby side Selknam ahead of the 2021 Súper Liga Americana de Rugby season. He previously played for Bayonne in France, while he also had spells at La Voulte-Valence, Montauban and Anglet.
