= Christian Poidevin =

Australian rugby union player

- Born: 9 September 1998 (age 28) Australia
- Height: 1.88 m (6 ft 2 in)
- Weight: 104 kg (229 lb; 16 st 5 lb)
- School: Newington College
- University: University of New South Wales
- Notable relative: Simon Poidevin (father) Gabe Poidevin (brother)

Rugby union career
- Position: Flanker
Amateur team(s)
Years	Team	Apps	(Points)
2019–2020	Randwick	27	(25)
Senior career
Years	Team	Apps	(Points)
2018–2019	Sydney	5	(5)
2021–2022	LA Giltinis		
2023–	San Diego Legion		
- Correct as of 6 March 2023
International career
Years	Team	Apps	(Points)
2025-	United States	1	
- Correct as of 14 July 2025

Christian Poidevin (born 9 September 1998) is an Australian born American rugby union player for the San Diego Legion of Major League Rugby (MLR) and for USA internationally. His preferred position is flanker.

Poidevin is the son of former Wallaby Simon Poidevin. He attended Newington College and in 2022 earned a bachelor’s degree from the University of New South Wales. He previously played for the LA Giltinis in MLR.

== Professional career ==
Poidevin signed for Major League Rugby side LA Giltinis ahead of the 2021 Major League Rugby season. He had previously competed in the National Rugby Championship, representing Sydney in the 2018 and 2019 seasons.
