= Drew Wild =

New Zealand rugby union player

- Born: 14 July 2000 (age 26) New Zealand
- Height: 179 cm (5 ft 10 in)
- Weight: 86 kg (190 lb; 13 st 8 lb)
- School: Feilding High School

Rugby union career
- Position: Fullback
- Current team: Manawatu
Senior career
Years	Team	Apps	(Points)
2019–	Manawatu	54	(65)
2022–2025	Houston Sabercats	32	(53)
- Correct as of 14 September 2025

Drew Wild (born 14 July 2000 in New Zealand) is a New Zealand rugby union player who plays for the Manawatu Turbos in the National Provincial Championship. His playing position is fullback.

After switching to rugby from soccer football, Wild became the Feilding High School first XV captain and was signed to the Manawatu rugby academy. He has played for the Feilding Yellows in the Manawatu club competition. He made his Manawatu debut in August 2019 against Taranaki.

In 2021 he played for the New Zealand Barbarians team against the New Zealand Heartland XV.

In 2022 Wild commenced playing in the Major League Rugby for the Houston Sabercats.

Wild brought up his 50th game for the Manawatu Turbos in 2025 and starred in a win over Wellington.
