= Tomas Aoake =

New Zealand rugby union player (born 1995)

- Born: 6 September 1995 (age 31) Auckland, New Zealand
- Height: 1.82 m (6 ft 0 in)
- Weight: 100 kg (220 lb; 15 st 10 lb)
- School: De La Salle College
- Occupation: support work (Willing To Care)

Rugby union career
- Position: Wing
- Current team: San Diego Legion, Auckland
Senior career
Years	Team	Apps	(Points)
2017–2018	Tasman	5	(0)
2019–2021	North Harbour	16	(20)
2022–	San Diego Legion	37	(90)
2022, 2024	Auckland	9	(5)
- Correct as of 6 November 2024

Tomas Aoake (born 6 September 1995) is a New Zealand rugby union player, who currently plays for the San Diego Legion of Major League Rugby (MLR) and Auckland in the National Provincial Championship. His preferred position is wing.

== Professional career ==
Aoake signed for Major League Rugby side San Diego Legion for the 2022 Major League Rugby season. In October 2023, he re-signed with the club until the end of the 2026 Major League Rugby season.

On 1 August 2022, Aoake was named in the Auckland squad for the 2022 Bunnings NPC season. He returned to the squad two years later for the 2024 season.

He previously played for Tasman and was a member of the North Harbour squad from 2019 to 2021.
