= Mika Kruse =

United States rugby union player

- Born: June 27, 1998 (age 28) United States
- Height: 1.85 m (6 ft 1 in)
- Weight: 95 kg (15.0 st; 209 lb)

Rugby union career
- Position: Centre / Wing
Senior career
Years	Team	Apps	(Points)
2018–2020	Colorado Raptors	29	(40)
2021	LA Giltinis	0	(0)
2021–2024	Utah Warriors	12	(30)
2025–	Seattle Seawolves	0	(0)
- Correct as of 7 February 2025
International career
Years	Team	Apps	(Points)
2018	USA Selects	3	(5)
2021–	United States	4	(5)
- Correct as of 3 October 2021

Mika Kruse (born June 27, 1998) is an American rugby union player who plays for the Seattle Seawolves of Major League Rugby and the United States national team. His preferred position is centre or wing.

== Professional career ==
Kruse signed for Major League Rugby side Utah Warriors for the 2021 Major League Rugby season, having played for Colorado Raptors from 2018 to 2020, having also signed but not played for the LA Giltinis. He signed with the Seattle Seawolves in October 2024.

Kruse debuted for United States against England during the 2021 July rugby union tests.
