= Chris Mattina =

American rugby union player

- Born: Chris, Henry Mattina; 31 March 1993 (age 33) Manhattan, New York, United States
- Height: 6 ft 2 in (1.88 m)
- Weight: 205 lb (93 kg)
- School: Xavier High School
- University: University of Delaware

Rugby union career
- Position(s): Centre, Wing, Full Back, Fly Half
- Current team: Chicago Hounds
Amateur team(s)
Years	Team	Apps	(Points)
2015–2017	Wilmington RFC		
2017–2019	NYAC		
Senior career
Years	Team	Apps	(Points)
2018	San Diego Legion	0	(0)
2019–2021	Rugby United New York	16	(42)
2022	Austin Gilgronis		
2023–	Chicago Hounds		
- Correct as of 18 March 2023
National sevens teams
Years	Team		Comps
2017	USA Falcons		
2018–	United States		8

Chris Henry Mattina (born 31 March 1993) is an American professional rugby union player. He plays as a centre, wing or full back for the Chicago Hounds in Major League Rugby (MLR).

He previously played for Rugby United New York (RUNY) and the Austin Gilgronis in the MLR. He was also a part of the professional USA 7s residency program at Chula Vista, California.
