= Te Rangatira Waitokia =

New Zealand rugby union player

- Born: 11 April 1996 (age 30) New Zealand
- Height: 1.80 m (5 ft 11 in)
- Weight: 91 kg (14.3 st; 201 lb)

Rugby union career
- Position(s): Centre, Wing, Fullback
- Current team: Manawatu, Anthem Rugby Carolina
Senior career
Years	Team	Apps	(Points)
2017–2020, 2023–	Manawatu	28	(10)
2021–2023	Rugby ATL	42	(70)
2022	Tasman	1	(0)
2024–	Anthem Rugby Carolina	11	(35)
- Correct as of 4 August 2024

Te Rangatira W. Waitokia (born 11 April 1996) is a New Zealand rugby union player who currently plays for Manawatu in New Zealand's domestic National Provincial Championship competition and Anthem Rugby Carolina in Major League Rugby (MLR). His position is wing or fullback.

== Career ==
Waitokia played four seasons for Manawatu in the Mitre 10 Cup from 2017 to 20202.

Waitokia then signed for Major League Rugby side Rugby ATL ahead of the 2021 Major League Rugby season.

He returned to New Zealand as a replacement player for Tasman during the 2022 Bunnings NPC. The following season he again played for Manawatu.

On 2 February 2024, Waitokia was named in the Anthem Rugby Carolina squad for the 2024 Major League Rugby season.
