= Josh Henderson (rugby union) =

Scottish rugby union player

- Born: Josh Henderson; 2 July 1997 (age 29) Kirkcaldy, Scotland
- Height: 1.82 m (6 ft 0 in)
- Weight: 87 kg (13 st 10 lb)
- School: Strathallan School

Rugby union career
- Position: Fly-half
Amateur team(s)
Years	Team	Apps	(Points)
- Howe of Fife RFC
- Glasgow Hawks
2017–18	→Stade Niçois		
2020–	USRC Tigers RFC		
Senior career
Years	Team	Apps	(Points)
2016–18	Glasgow Warriors		
2023–	San Diego Legion		
Super Rugby
Years	Team	Apps	(Points)
2019	Stirling County	2	(16)
International career
Years	Team	Apps	(Points)
- Scotland U16
–	Scotland U19		
–	Scotland U20		
National sevens team
Years	Team		Comps
2018–	Scotland 7s		

Josh Henderson (born 2 July 1997) is a Scotland 7s professional international rugby union player. He also plays for the San Diego Legion in Major League Rugby (MLR). His position is fly-half.

He previously played for Glasgow Hawks, Glasgow Warriors and Stade Niçois.

== Rugby Union career ==
=== Amateur career ===
Henderson played rugby for Strathallan School and Howe of Fife.

Henderson plays for Glasgow Hawks.

He was enrolled in the Scottish Rugby Academy in season 2015-16 in the Caledonia regional academy as a Stage 2 player.

The following season 2016-17 he remained a Stage 2 player but moved to the Glasgow regional academy.

On 25 July 2017 it was announced that Henderson would be loaned out to Stade Niçois, a Federale 2 club in France, outwith the French professional leagues.

=== Professional career ===
Henderson was playing for Glasgow Warriors under 16 side while still at Strathallan School.

On 30 August 2016 Henderson made his senior Glasgow Warriors debut against Canada 'A' at Bridgehaugh Park, Stirling, replacing Hagen Schulte in the middle of the second half.

He managed to score a try on his debut, with The Glasgow Herald noting that Henderson seemed hungry for success.

At Glasgow Warriors he is mentored by Finn Russell. Henderson said: "The main thing I took from my most recent chat with him is not just playing what is in front of me, but thinking a couple of phases ahead to give myself time on the ball and that has helped me a lot."

Henderson graduated to be a Stage 3 academy player for the 2017-18 season. Stage 3 players are assigned to a professional club and Henderson is assigned to Glasgow Warriors.

Henderson now plays for the Super 6 rugby union side Stirling County.

=== International career ===
Henderson has come through the age-grades with Scotland. While with Howe of Fife he represented Scotland U16s.

He has played for the Scotland U19s.

Henderson played with the Scotland U20s.

He has now signed a professional contract with the Scotland 7s side.
