= Le Roux Malan =

Namibian rugby union player

- Born: 31 March 1999 (age 27) Windhoek, Namibia
- Height: 191 cm (6 ft 3 in)
- Weight: 96 kg (212 lb; 15 st 2 lb)
- School: Paarl Boys' High School
- University: University of Cape Town

Rugby union career
- Position: Centre
- Current team: Cardiff Rugby
Senior career
Years	Team	Apps	(Points)
2019	Sharks XV		
2022–2025	New England Free Jacks	59	(89)
2024–2025	Hawke's Bay	8	(15)
2025–2026	Sharks	9	(15)
2026-	Cardiff Rugby	0	(0)
- Correct as of 15 July 2026
International career
Years	Team	Apps	(Points)
2022–	Namibia	4	(0)
- Correct as of 15 July 2026

Le Roux Malan (born 31 March 1999) is a Namibian rugby union player, who currently plays for Cardiff Rugby in the United Rugby Championship and Investec Champions Cup. He has previously played for the New England Free Jacks in Major League Rugby (MLR), Hawke's Bay in New Zealand's domestic National Provincial Championship competition and the Sharks in the United Rugby Championship. He represents Namibia internationally.

== Early career ==
Born in Windhoek, Namibia, Malan attended Paarl Boys' High School and then attended the University of Cape Town where he represented the Ikey Tigers side in the Varsity Cup.

== Professional career ==
Malan represented the Sharks XV in the 2019 Rugby Challenge. He signed for the New England Free Jacks ahead of the 2022 Major League Rugby season.

In late 2022, he was selected for the Namibia national side, and made his debut against Spain. He would also appear in two matches for the squad during the 2023 World Cup. During the event Malan dislocated his ankle, along with fracturing his fibula, and tearing his semitendinosus in the first half of Namibia's loss to the All Blacks. He would return to Boston to work the Free Jacks head medical coach, ultimately recovering and rejoining the team six games into the 2024 MLR season.

In 2023, Malan scored the game-winning try in the 76th minute of the MLR Championship Final, giving the New England Free Jacks a 25–24 win over San Diego Legion and the club's first MLR title. At the end of the year he would be named to the all MLR first team scoring 9 tries in 11 appearances. After coming back from an injury he suffered during the World Cup. He rejoined the free jacks in game 6 of the 2024 MLR season and would help the free jacks win a second MLR, again scoring a try in the Championship Final.

On 29 July 2024, Malan was named in the Hawke's Bay squad for the 2024 Bunnings NPC season. He made his debut for the province on 28 August 2024 against Canterbury.

He returned to the Free Jacks making 17 appearances in 2025 and winning a 3rd straight MLR championship. He then played another season for Hawke's Bay in the Bunnings NPC, where he scored three tries and helped the team reach the semi-final, but missed out on playing that game due to injury.

On November 14, 2025, it was announced Malan would return to Sharks. In a statement Malan commented “It’s hard to put into words what the last few years with the Free Jacks have meant to me. This club, this city, and every person who has been part of this journey has shaped me in ways I'll carry for the rest of my life.” In nine appearances Malan scored three tries for the club.

On April 29, 2026, Cardiff Rugby announced the signing of Malan for the 2026-27 United Rugby Championship season and the 2026-27 European Rugby Champions Cup. Malan said “I’m really looking forward to joining Cardiff. I have always wanted to play my rugby abroad, especially in the UK so I am excited for the opportunity to learn a new style. I’m also someone who really values different cultures and embracing it, so I can’t wait to meet the Welsh people and form part of the club."

== Personal life ==
Malan's parents, Liesl and Van Reenen, and his siblings, Stef, Mila, and Hannah, watch his games from South Africa. Malan travels in the cities where he plays and participates in thrift shopping.

== Honours ==
New England Free Jacks

- Major League Rugby Championship: 3x (2023, 2024, 2025)
- All Major League Rugby first team: (2023)
