= Gideon van Wyk =

South African rugby union player

- Full name: Gideon van Wyk
- Born: 28 March 2001 (age 25) Lichtenburg, South Africa
- Height: 1.90 m (6 ft 3 in)
- Weight: 103 kg (227 lb)

Rugby union career
- Position: Flanker
- Current team: Houston SaberCats
Senior career
Years	Team	Apps	(Points)
2021	Cheetahs	0	(0)
2021	Free State Cheetahs	3	(5)
2022–	Houston SaberCats	23	(80)
- Correct as of 26 June 2023

Gideon van Wyk (born 28 March 2001) is a South African rugby union player for the Cheetahs and Free State Cheetahs. He also plays for the Houston SaberCats in Major League Rugby (MLR). His regular position is flanker.

Van Wyk was named in the Free State Cheetahs squad for the 2021 Currie Cup Premier Division. He made his debut for the in Round 2 of the 2021 Currie Cup Premier Division against the Griquas.
