= Lauina Futi =

US international rugby union player

- Born: January 5, 1996 (age 30) Mapusaga, American Samoa
- Height: 5 ft 10 in (178 cm)
- Weight: 205 lb (93 kg)

Rugby union career
- Position: Fly-half / Wing
Senior career
| Years | Team | Apps | (Points) |
| 2021– | Seattle Seawolves | 53 | (109) |
International career
| Years | Team | Apps | (Points) |
| 2023– | United States | 3 | (5) |

Lauina Futi (born January 5, 1996) is a professional rugby union player from American Samoa.

Futi comes from the village of Mapusaga in American Samoa and was educated at Tafuna High School. He was a football running back in a dominant school side that claimed back to back varsity championships in undefeated seasons.

A fly-half and winger, Futi got started in rugby as a 19 year old at the San Louis Obsibo club in California. He has played Major League Rugby with the Seattle Seawolves since the 2021 season and made his international debut for the United States in 2023, gaining his first cap in a Test against Portugal.

== See also ==
- List of United States national rugby union players
