= Will Hooley =

American rugby union player (born 1993)

- Full name: William John E. Hooley
- Born: 28 November 1993 (age 32) Cambridge, England
- Height: 6 ft 2 in (188 cm)
- Weight: 196 lb (89 kg)
- School: The Leys School

Rugby union career
- Position: Fly-half
Youth career
- Cambridge
Senior career
Years	Team	Apps	(Points)
2012–2015	Northampton Saints	16	(80)
2013–2015	Birmingham Moseley	14	(84)
2015–2017	Exeter Chiefs	14	(23)
2017–2020	Bedford Blues	49	(323)
2020—2021	Saracens	10	(26)
2022—	San Diego Legion	0	(0)
- Correct as of 25 December 2020
International career
Years	Team	Apps	(Points)
2013	England U20	3	(24)
2018–	United States	18	(28)
- Correct as of 3 October 2021

William John E. Hooley (born 28 November 1993) is a former rugby union player who played fly-half for the San Diego Legion in Major League Rugby (MLR) and the United States.

Hooley previously played for the Northampton Saints, Birmingham Moseley on loan, Exeter Chiefs, Bedford Blues and Saracens Rugby Club.

Hooley also previously represented England at the international level with two age-grade sides, winning the 2013 IRB Junior World Championship.

== Early life ==
Will Hooley was born in Cambridge, and grew up playing for Cambridge Rugby Club mini and youth level teams. Hooley attended St John's College School and The Leys School, and began playing at the academy level with the Northampton Saints.

== Club career ==
Hooley played for Bedford Blues having signed for them from Exeter Chiefs for the 2017-18 season. In March 2018, it was announced that Hooley had signed a one-year contract extension with the Blues, through the 2018–19 season. Hooley joined the Exeter Chiefs from fellow Premiership team Northampton Saints in 2015, making his debut against Clermont Auvergne in the European Rugby Champions Cup.

He signed for Saracens ahead of the 2020–21 season.

== International career ==
=== England under-18 and under-20 teams ===
Hooley first represented England at the international level playing for the England national under-18 rugby union team. In 2013, he represented England in the World Rugby Under 20 Championship and was part of the winning team in the 2013 IRB Junior World Championship.

=== USA Eagles ===
In 2018, Hooley was named to the United States national rugby union team, with whom he qualifies through his American grandmother, for the 2018 Americas Rugby Championship. Hooley made his debut for the Eagles on 3 February 2018, appearing as a substitute, in an uncapped 17–10 victory over Argentina XV. Hooley earned his first cap for the Eagles on 10 February 2018, again appearing as a substitute, in a 29–10 victory over Canada.
