= Charlie Hewitt (rugby union) =

English rugby union player

- Born: 6 February 1995 (age 31) England
- Height: 2.01 m (6 ft 7 in)
- Weight: 118 kg (18 st 8 lb)

Rugby union career
- Position: Lock
- Current team: Rugby New York
Senior career
Years	Team	Apps	(Points)
2015–2017	Worcester Warriors	6	(0)
2015	→ London Scottish (dual-registration)	2	(0)
2016–2017	→ London Scottish (dual-registration)	7	(0)
2018	Houston SaberCats	8	(5)
2020–present	Rugby New York	2	(0)
- Correct as of 22 June 2023

Charlie Hewitt (born 6 February 1995) is an English rugby union player, currently playing for Rugby New York (Ironworkers) of Major League Rugby (MLR). His preferred position is lock.

== Professional career ==
Hewitt signed for Major League Rugby side Rugby United New York ahead of the 2020 Major League Rugby season, and re-signed ahead of the 2021 Major League Rugby season.

He had previously played for Worcester Warriors and London Scottish, having come from the Worcester academy.

He also represented Houston SaberCats in the 2018 Major League Rugby season and is American qualified.
