= Faʻasui Fuatai =

New Zealand rugby union player

Fa'asui Fuatai
- Born: 1 August 1993 (age 33) New Zealand
- Height: 1.80 m (5 ft 11 in)
- Weight: 94 kg (14.8 st; 207 lb)

Rugby union career
- Position: Centre / Wing
Senior career
Years	Team	Apps	(Points)
2013–2016	Otago	28	(40)
2017–2018	Bordeaux Bègles	17	(20)
2018–	Bay of Plenty	22	(40)
2021–	Rugby New York	0	(0)
- Correct as of 6 March 2023
International career
Years	Team	Apps	(Points)
2013	New Zealand U20s	3	(10)
- Correct as of 31 January 2021
National sevens team
Years	Team		Comps
2017	New Zealand Sevens		2
- Correct as of 31 January 2021

Fa'asui Fuatai (born 1 August 1993) is a New Zealand rugby union player currently playing for Rugby New York (Ironworkers) in Major League Rugby (MLR). His preferred position is centre or wing.

== Professional career ==
Fuatai signed for Major League Rugby side Rugby United New York ahead of the 2021 Major League Rugby season. He had previously played for Otago and currently plays for Bay of Plenty in the Mitre 10 Cup. He also played for French side Bordeaux Bègles. Fuatai played for the New Zealand Sevens team at two competitions in 2017.

== Personal life ==
Fuatai is in a relationship with Gina Crampton, the New Zealand netball international.
