= 2023 Rugby World Cup – Regional play-off and Final Qualification Tournament =

Stages of the 2023 Rugby World Cup

The 2023 Rugby World Cup regional play-off and Final Qualification Tournament were the final two stages of the qualifying process for the 2023 Rugby World Cup. A cross-regional play-off match determined the Asia/Pacific play-off winner berth, after which a global repechage tournament between four teams (Africa 2, Americas 3, Europe 3 and the loser of the Asia/Pacific play-off) decided the twentieth and final team qualifying for the 2023 Rugby World Cup.

Tonga and Portugal secured the last two berths by winning respectively the Asia/Pacific play-off and Final Qualification Tournament.

== Format ==
=== Asia/Pacific play-off ===
This match will be a single leg qualification match between Asia 1 (the winner of the Asian qualification process) and Oceania 2 (the winner of Round 3 in the Oceania qualification process). The winner of this play-off qualifies for the World Cup as Asia/Pacific Play-off winner and join Pool B, whilst the loser advances to the Final Qualification Tournament.

=== Final Qualification Tournament ===
The Final Qualification Tournament will be contested as a four-team round-robin tournament and hosted at a neutral venue in Dubai, replicating the process first introduced for the 2019 Rugby World Cup. The participating teams include the runner-up of the African qualification round 3 (Africa 2), the losing side of the Americas 2 qualifier (Americas 3), the third-ranked side of the Europe qualification (Europe 3), and the loser of the Asia/Oceania play-off (Asia 1 or Oceania 2). The winner will qualify for the 2023 Rugby World Cup and will join Pool C.

== Teams ==
Five teams progressed to the regional play-off and Final Qualification Tournament stages for the final two non-regional seeds in the World Cup. World rankings are as per date progressing to the play-off phase.

Nation	Rank	Progression date	Qualifying status
Regional Qualification play-off
Tonga	16	17 July 2021	Qualified by defeating Hong Kong on 23 July 2022
Final Qualification Tournament
Hong Kong	22	23 July 2022	Eliminated by United States on 12 November 2022
Kenya	33	10 July 2022	Eliminated by Portugal on 12 November 2022
Portugal	20	27 June 2022	Qualified on 18 November 2022
United States	19	16 July 2022	Eliminated by Portugal on 18 November 2022

== Asia/Pacific play-off ==
23 July 2022
17:30 AEST (UTC+10)

Tonga	44–22	Hong Kong
Try: Takulua (3) 15' c, 25' c, 42' m Fisi'ihoi 47' m Veainu 60' c Tuitavuki 62' c Con: Havili (4/6) 16', 27', 61', 63'; Pen: Havili (2/2) 11', 35'	Report; WR Report	Try: Post 18' m Worley (2) 77' c, 80' c Con: McNeish (2/3) 78', 80'; Pen: McNeish (1/1) 30'

Sunshine Coast Stadium, Sunshine Coast, Australia
Referee: Damon Murphy (Australia)

Team details

FB	15	Telusa Veainu		(substituted off) 75'
RW	14	Tima Fainga'anuku
OC	13	Afusipa Taumoepeau
IC	12	Fetuli Paea
LW	11	Anzelo Tuitavuki		(substituted off) 70'
FH	10	William Havili		(substituted off) 70'
SH	9	Sonatane Takulua (c)		(substituted off) 64'
N8	8	Sione Havili Talitui		(substituted off) 70'
OF	7	Solomone Funaki		(substituted off) 37'	(substituted on) 39'
BF	6	Tanginoa Halaifonua
RL	5	Sam Lousi
LL	4	Leva Fifita		(substituted off) 71'
TP	3	Ben Tameifuna		(substituted off) 62'
HK	2	Siua Maile	(yellow card) 29'			(substituted off) 53'
LP	1	Siegfried Fisi'ihoi		(substituted off) 62'
Replacements:
HK	16	Sam Moli		(substituted on) 37'	(substituted off) 39'	(substituted on) 53'
PR	17	David Lolohea		(substituted on) 62'
PR	18	Siate Tokolahi		(substituted on) 62'
LK	19	Semisi Paea		(substituted on) 71'
FL	20	Lopeti Timani		(substituted on) 70'
SH	21	Manu Paea		(substituted on) 64'
FH	22	James Faiva		(substituted on) 70'
WG	23	Otumaka Mausia		(substituted on) 70'
Coach:
(Australia) Toutai Kefu

FB	15	Nate de Theiry
RW	14	Matt Worley
OC	13	Benjamin Axten-Burrett
IC	12	Tom Hill
LW	11	Guy Spanton	(substituted off) 75'
FH	10	Gregor McNeish
SH	9	Jack Combes	(substituted off) 62'
N8	8	Joshua Hrstich (c)
OF	7	Luke van der Smit	(substituted off) 71'
BF	6	James Sawyer	(substituted off) 43'	(substituted on) 55'
RL	5	Patrick Jenkinson	(substituted off) 75'
LL	4	James Cunningham		(substituted off) 55'
TP	3	Faizal Solomona Penesa	(substituted off) 64'
HK	2	Alexander Post	(substituted off) 55'
LP	1	Callum Smith	(substituted off) 64'
Replacements:
HK	16	John McCormick-Houston	(substituted on) 55'
PR	17	Ashton Hyde	(substituted on) 64'
PR	18	Ian Etheridge	(substituted on) 64'
FL	19	Jamie Pincott	(substituted on) 43'
LK	20	Kyle Sullivan	(substituted on) 75'
FL	21	Gregor Ramage	(substituted on) 71'
SH	22	Bryn Phillips	(substituted on) 62'
WG	23	Will Panday	(substituted on) 75'
Coach:
(Wales) Lewis Evans

Assistant referees:
Nic Berry (Australia)
Graham Cooper (Australia)
Television match official:
James Leckie (Australia)

Notes:

- This was the first meeting between the two sides.

== Final Qualification Tournament ==
Qualified as Final Qualification Tournament winner

Pos.	Nation	Games				Points			Try Bonus	Losing Bonus	Table points
Pos.	Nation	Played	Won	Drawn	Lost	For	Against	Diff.	Try Bonus	Losing Bonus	Table points
1	Portugal	3	2	1	0	143	30	+113	2	0	12
2	United States	3	2	1	0	133	37	+96	2	0	12
3	Hong Kong	3	1	0	2	43	109	–66	0	0	4
4	Kenya	3	0	0	3	32	175	–143	0	1	1
Points were awarded to the teams as follows: 4 points for a win, 2 points for a draw, no points for a loss 1 bonus point for scoring 4 or more tries (TBP); 1 bonus point for a loss by 7 points or under (LBP)

=== Fixtures ===
==== Round 1 ====
6 November 2022
16:00 GST (UTC+04)

(1 BP) United States	68–14	Kenya
Try: Fawsitt (3) 22' m', 33' c, 48' c Faʻanana-Schultz 40' c Dyer (3) 51' c, 61' c, 64' c Augspurger 59' c Sosene-Feagai 69' c Wilson 76' c Con: Carty (4/5) 33', 40', 49', 53'; MacGinty (5/5) 60', 63', 66', 70', 76'	Report	Try: Juma 55' c Weru 78' c Con: Mukidza (2/2) 56', 79'

The Sevens Stadium, Dubai
Referee: Tual Trainini (France)

Team details

FB	15	Mitch Wilson
RW	14	Christian Dyer
OC	13	Marcel Brache (c)
IC	12	Paul Lasike		(substituted off) 53'
LW	11	Nate Augspurger
FH	10	Luke Carty		(substituted off) 59'
SH	9	Ryan Rees		(substituted off) 59'
N8	8	Jamason Faʻanana-Schultz		(substituted off) 63'
OF	7	Cory Daniel
BF	6	Viliami Helu
RL	5	Cam Dolan		(substituted off) 54'
LL	4	Siaosi Mahoni	(yellow card) 7'
TP	3	Paul Mullen		(substituted off) 58'
HK	2	Dylan Fawsitt		(substituted off) 53'
LP	1	Jack Iscaro		(substituted off) 53'
Replacements:
HK	16	Mike Sosene-Feagai		(substituted on) 53'
PR	17	David Ainuʻu		(substituted on) 53'
PR	18	Nathan Sylvia		(substituted on) 58'
LK	19	Greg Peterson		(substituted on) 54'
FL	20	Moni Tonga’uiha		(substituted on) 63'
SH	21	Ruben de Haas		(substituted on) 59'
CE	22	Bryce Campbell		(substituted on) 59'
FH	23	AJ MacGinty		(substituted on) 53'
Coach:
(South Africa) Gary Gold

FB	15	Darwin Mukidza
RW	14	Geofrey Okwach	(yellow card) 16'	(substituted off) 51'
OC	13	Bryceson Adaka
IC	12	John Okoth
LW	11	Jacob Ojee
FH	10	Geoffrey Ominde		(substituted off) 47'
SH	9	Samuel Asati
N8	8	Bethwel Anami		(substituted off) 47'
OF	7	Daniel Sikuta (c)		(substituted off) 57'
BF	6	George Nyambua
RL	5	Thomas Okeyo		(substituted off) 51'
LL	4	Malcolm Onsando
TP	3	Ephraim Oduor		(substituted off) 58'
HK	2	Eugene Sifuna		(substituted off) 58'
LP	1	Patrick Ouko		(substituted off) 51'
Replacements:
HK	16	Teddy Akala		(substituted on) 58'
PR	17	Andrew Siminyu		(substituted on) 51'
PR	18	Joseph Odero		(substituted on) 58'
LK	19	Brian Juma		(substituted on) 51'
FL	20	Martin Owilah		(substituted on) 57'
SH	21	Brian Tanga		(substituted on) 47'
FH	22	Timothy Omela		(substituted on) 51'
CE	23	Joshua Weru		(substituted on) 47'
Coach:
(Kenya) Paul Odera

Assistant referees:
Damian Schneider (Argentina)
Eoghan Cross (Ireland)
Television match official:
Olly Hodges (Ireland)

Notes:

- Cory Daniel, Viliami Helu, Jack Iscaro, Ryan Rees, Nathan Sylvia and Mitch Wilson (all United States) made their international debuts.
- This was the first meeting between these two nations.

6 November 2022
18:30 GST (UTC+04)

(1 BP) Portugal	42–14	Hong Kong
Try: Madeira 16' c Storti (2) 24' c, 50' c Morais 29' c Marta 43' c Lima 55' c Con: Marques (6/6); 17', 25', 30', 44', 52', 56'; Pen: Marques (0/1)	Report	Try: Post 7' c Neville 60' c Con: McNeish (2/2) 8', 61'

The Sevens Stadium, Dubai
Referee: Chris Busby (Ireland)

Team details

FB	15	Nuno Sousa Guedes
RW	14	Rodrigo Marta
OC	13	José Lima		(substituted off) 70'
IC	12	Tomás Appleton (c)
LW	11	Raffaele Storti		(substituted off) 70'
FH	10	Miguel Morais
SH	9	Samuel Marques		(substituted off) 63'
N8	8	Rafael Simões		(substituted off) 63'
OF	7	David Carvalho		(substituted off) 52'
BF	6	João Granate	(yellow card) 35'	(substituted off) 75'
RL	5	José Madeira
LL	4	Steevy Cerqueira
TP	3	Diogo Hasse Ferreira		(substituted off) 64'
HK	2	Mike Tadjer		(substituted off) 64'
LP	1	Francisco Fernandes		(substituted off) 62'
Replacements:
PR	16	David Costa		(substituted on) 64'
HK	17	Duarte Diniz		(substituted on) 62'
PR	18	António Costa		(substituted on) 64'
LK	19	Duarte Torgal	(yellow card) 76'	(substituted on) 52'
FL	20	Thibault de Freitas		(substituted on) 63'
SH	21	Pedro Lucas		(substituted on) 63'
FB	22	Manuel Cardoso Pinto		(substituted on) 70'
WG	23	Vincent Pinto		(substituted on) 70'
Coach:
(France) Patrice Lagisquet

FB	15	Nathan de Thierry
RW	14	Matt Worley	(substituted off) 52'
OC	13	Jack Neville
IC	12	Tom Hill	(substituted off) 56'
LW	11	Sean Taylor	(substituted off) 58'
FH	10	Gregor McNeish
SH	9	Jamie Lauder	(substituted off) 69'
N8	8	Joshua Hrstich (c)	(substituted off) 58'
OF	7	James Sawyer
BF	6	James Cunningham
RL	5	Mark Prior
LL	4	Patrick Jenkinson	(substituted off) 47'
TP	3	Zac Cinnamond	(substituted off) 62'
HK	2	Alexander Post	(substituted off) 64'
LP	1	Ben Higgins	(substituted off) 56'
Replacements:
HK	16	John McCormick-Houston	(substituted on) 56'
PR	17	Ashton Hyde	(substituted on) 64'
PR	18	Ian Etheridge	(substituted on) 62'
FL	19	Jamie Pincott	(substituted on) 58'
LK	20	Luke van der Smit	(substituted on) 47'
SH	21	Bryn Phillips	(substituted on) 69'
WG	22	Charles Higson-Smith	(substituted on) 57'
CE	23	Guy Spanto	(substituted on) 58'
Coach:
(Wales) Lewis Evans

Assistant referees:
Damian Schneider (Argentina)
Eoghan Cross (Ireland)
Television match official:
Olly Hodges (Ireland)

Notes:

- Sean Taylor (Hong Kong) made his international debut.
- This was Portugal's first victory over Hong Kong.
- No replacement was issued for João Granate.

==== Round 2 ====
12 November 2022
16:00 GST (UTC+04)

(1 BP) Portugal	85–0	Kenya
Try: Tadjer (3) 1' c, 7' c, 45' m Cardoso Pinto 16' c Lima 22' c Pinto (2) 32' c, 47' m Appleton (2) 49' c, 60' c de Andrade 53' c Penalty try 69'; Bello 72' m Campergue 77' c Con: Marques (7/9); 2', 8', 17', 23', 34', 49', 54'; Portela (1/2) 61'; Guedes (1/1) 78'	Report

The Sevens Stadium, Dubai
Referee: Nika Amashukeli (Georgia)

Team details

FB	15	Simão Bento
RW	14	Vincent Pinto
OC	13	José Lima	(substituted off) 46'
IC	12	Tomás Appleton (c)
LW	11	Manuel Cardoso Pinto	(substituted off) 67'
FH	10	Jerónimo Portela
SH	9	Samuel Marques	(substituted off) 59'
N8	8	Thibault de Freitas	(substituted off) 57'
OF	7	José Madeira
BF	6	Nicolas Martins
RL	5	José Rebelo de Andrade
LL	4	Steevy Cerqueira	(substituted off) 59'
TP	3	António Costa	(substituted off) 62'
HK	2	Mike Tadjer	(substituted off) 49'
LP	1	David Costa	(substituted off) 59'
Replacements:
PR	16	Francisco Fernandes	(substituted on) 59'
HK	17	Lionel Campergue	(substituted on) 49'
PR	18	Diogo Ferreira	(substituted on) 62'
LK	19	Duarte Torgal	(substituted on) 59'
FL	20	Antonio Cerejo	(substituted on) 57'
SH	21	João Bello	(substituted on) 59'
WG	22	Raffaele Storti	(substituted on) 46'
FB	23	Nuno Sousa Guedes	(substituted on) 67'
Coach:
(France) Patrice Lagisquet

FB	15	Samuel Asati		(substituted off) 59'
RW	14	Timothy Omela
OC	13	Bryceson Adaka		(substituted off) 62'
IC	12	John Okoth
LW	11	Beldad Ogeta		(substituted off) 49'
FH	10	Harmony Wamalwa
SH	9	Brian Tanga
N8	8	Joshua Weru		(substituted off) 56'
OF	7	Martin Owilah
BF	6	Thomas Okeyo
RL	5	Brian Juma	(yellow card) 29' (red card) 42'
LL	4	Malcolm Onsando (c)		(substituted off) 49'
TP	3	Ephraim Oduor		(substituted off) 49'
HK	2	Teddy Akala		(substituted off) 41'
LP	1	Edward Mwaura		(substituted off) 42'
Replacements:
HK	16	Eugene Sifuna		(substituted on) 41'
PR	17	Andrew Siminyu		(substituted on) 42'
PR	18	Ian Masheti		(substituted on) 49'
LK	19	Clinton Odhiambo		(substituted on) 56'
FL	20	George Nyambua		(substituted on) 49'
SH	21	Samson Onsomu		(substituted on) 59'
CE	22	Peter Kilonzo		(substituted on) 62'
WG	23	Geofrey Okwach	(yellow card) 76'	(substituted on) 49'
Coach:
(Kenya) Paul Odera

Assistant referees:
Damian Schneider (Argentina)
AJ Jacobs (South Africa)
Television match official:
Olly Hodges (Ireland)

12 November 2022
18:30 GST (UTC+04)

(1 BP) United States	49–7	Hong Kong
Try: Faʻanana-Schultz 12' c K. Pifeleti 20' c Augspurger (2) 25' c, 57' c Dolan 36' c Wilson 47' c Tonga’uiha 77' c Con: MacGinty (6/6); 14', 22', 27', 37', 49', 58'; Carty (1/1) 78'	Report	Try: Worley 65' c Con: Cumming (1/1) 66'

The Sevens Stadium, Dubai
Referee: Matthew Carley (England)

Team details

FB	15	Mitch Wilson
RW	14	Christian Dyer
OC	13	Marcel Brache
IC	12	Paul Lasike	(substituted off) 59'
LW	11	Nate Augspurger
FH	10	AJ MacGinty (c)	(substituted off) 62'
SH	9	Ruben de Haas	(substituted off) 64'
N8	8	Jamason Faʻanana-Schultz	(substituted off) 50'
OF	7	Cory Daniel
BF	6	Viliami Helu
RL	5	Cam Dolan
LL	4	Greg Peterson	(substituted off) 59'
TP	3	Paul Mullen	(substituted off) 59'
HK	2	Kapeli Pifeleti	(substituted off) 50'
LP	1	David Ainuʻu	(substituted off) 50'
Replacements:
HK	16	Dylan Fawsitt	(substituted on) 50'
PR	17	Chance Wenglewski	(substituted on) 50'
PR	18	Nathan Sylvia	(substituted on) 59'
LK	19	Siaosi Mahoni	(substituted on) 59'
FL	20	Moni Tonga’uiha	(substituted on) 50'
SH	21	Ryan Rees	(substituted on) 64'
FH	22	Luke Carty	(substituted on) 62'
CE	23	Bryce Campbell	(substituted on) 59'
Coach:
(South Africa) Gary Gold

FB	15	Nathan de Thierry
RW	14	Matt Worley
OC	13	Jack Neville
IC	12	Tom Hill	(substituted off) 70'
LW	11	Sean Taylor	(substituted off) 60'
FH	10	Gregor McNeish	(substituted off) 64'
SH	9	Bryn Phillips
N8	8	Luke van der Smit
OF	7	Gregor Ramage	(substituted off) 59'
BF	6	Joshua Hrstich (c)
RL	5	James Cunningham
LL	4	Mark Prior	(substituted off) 64'
TP	3	Zac Cinnamond	(substituted off) 63'
HK	2	Alexander Post	(substituted off) 67'
LP	1	Ben Higgins	(substituted off) 60'
Replacements:
HK	16	John McCormick-Houston	(substituted on) 67'
PR	17	Ashton Hyde	(substituted on) 60'
PR	18	Faizal Solomona	(substituted on) 63'
FL	19	Jamie Pincott	(substituted on) 64'
LK	20	Kyle Sullivan	(substituted on) 59'
SH	21	Jamie Lauder	(substituted on) 70'
FH	22	Nickolas Cumming	(substituted on) 64'
CE	23	Guy Spanton	(substituted on) 60'
Coach:
(Wales) Lewis Evans

Assistant referees:
Damian Schneider (Argentina)
AJ Jacobs (South Africa)
Television match official:
Olly Hodges (Ireland)

Notes:

- Nickolas Cumming (Hong Kong) made his international debut.

==== Round 3 ====
18 November 2022
17:00 GST (UTC+04)

Hong Kong	22–18	Kenya (1 BP)
Try: van der Smit 19' c Taylor 45' c Lam 68' m Con: McNeish (2/3) 21', 46'; Pen: McNeish (1/1) 44'	Report	Try: Okoth 10' m Ojee 30' c Con: Ominde (1/2) 31'; Pen: Ominde (2/3) 35', 42'

The Sevens Stadium, Dubai
Referee: Angus Gardner (Australia)

Team details

FB	15	Nathan de Thierry	(yellow card) 39'
RW	14	Matt Worley	(yellow card) 4'
OC	13	Jack Neville
IC	12	Tom Hill
LW	11	Sean Taylor
FH	10	Gregor McNeish
SH	9	Bryn Phillips	(yellow card) 63'	(substituted off) 73'
N8	8	Luke van der Smit		(substituted off) 40'
OF	7	Gregor Ramage
BF	6	Joshua Hrstich (c)
RL	5	Kyle Sullivan
LL	4	Mark Prior
TP	3	Zac Cinnamond		(substituted off) 68'
HK	2	John McCormick-Houston		(substituted off) 64'
LP	1	Ashton Hyde		(substituted off) 71'
Replacements:
HK	16	Jak Lam		(substituted on) 64'
PR	17	Ben Higgins		(substituted on) 71'
PR	18	Keelan Chapman		(substituted on) 68'
LK	19	James Cunningham		(substituted on) 40'
FL	20	Sam Tsoi
SH	21	Jack Combes		(substituted on) 74'
FH	22	Nickolas Cumming
CE	23	Fong Kit Fung
Coach:
(Wales) Lewis Evans

FB	15	Darwin Mukidza
RW	14	Brian Tanga
OC	13	Bryceson Adaka
IC	12	John Okoth
LW	11	Jacob Ojee
FH	10	Geoffrey Ominde	(yellow card) 54'	(substituted off) 71'
SH	9	Samuel Asati		(substituted off) 75'
N8	8	Bethwel Anami		(substituted off) 52'
OF	7	Martin Owilah
BF	6	George Nyambua
RL	5	Brian Juma		(substituted off) 66'
LL	4	Malcolm Onsando (c)
TP	3	Ephraim Oduor		(substituted off) 70'
HK	2	Eugene Sifuna		(substituted off) 64'
LP	1	Patrick Ouko		(substituted off) 63'
Replacements:
HK	16	Brian Waraba		(substituted on) 64'
PR	17	Andrew Siminyu		(substituted on) 63'
PR	18	Joseph Odero		(substituted on) 70'
LK	19	Clinton Odhiambo		(substituted on) 66'
FL	20	Joshua Weru		(substituted on) 52'
SH	21	Geofrey Okwach		(substituted on) 71'
FH	22	Timothy Omela
CE	23	Samson Onsomu		(substituted on) 75'
Coach:
(Kenya) Paul Odera

Assistant referees:
Damian Schneider (Argentina)
AJ Jacobs (South Africa)
Television match official:
Chris Hart (New Zealand)

18 November 2022
19:30 GST (UTC+04)

United States	16–16	Portugal
Try: K. Pifeleti 60' c Con: MacGinty (1/1) 60'; Pen: MacGinty (3/4) 3', 22', 40'	Report	Try: Storti 8' c Con: Marques (1/1) 9'; Pen: Marques (3/5) 37', 50', 80+2'

The Sevens Stadium, Dubai
Referee: Paul Williams (New Zealand)

Team details

FB	15	Mitch Wilson
RW	14	Christian Dyer
OC	13	Bryce Campbell
IC	12	Paul Lasike
LW	11	Nate Augspurger	(yellow card) 6'
FH	10	AJ MacGinty (c)
SH	9	Ruben de Haas
N8	8	Jamason Faʻanana-Schultz		(substituted off) 76'
OF	7	Cory Daniel
BF	6	Viliami Helu		(substituted off) 47'
RL	5	Cam Dolan
LL	4	Greg Peterson
TP	3	Paul Mullen		(substituted off) 66'
HK	2	Kapeli Pifeleti		(substituted off) 66'
LP	1	David Ainuʻu		(substituted off) 79'
Replacements:
HK	16	Mike Sosene-Feagai		(substituted on) 66'
PR	17	Jack Iscaro		(substituted on) 66'
PR	18	Nathan Sylvia		(substituted on) 79'
FL	19	Benjamín Bonasso		(substituted on) 47'
FL	20	Moni Tonga’uiha		(substituted on) 76'
FH	21	Luke Carty
FB	22	Chris Mattina
CE	23	Tavite Lopeti
Coach:
(South Africa) Gary Gold

FB	15	Nuno Sousa Guedes		(substituted off) 78'
RW	14	Raffaele Storti
OC	13	José Lima		(yellow card) 21'	(substituted off) 60'
IC	12	Tomás Appleton (c)
LW	11	Rodrigo Marta
FH	10	Jerónimo Portela
SH	9	Samuel Marques
N8	8	Thibault de Freitas		(substituted off) 66'
OF	7	Rafael Simões
BF	6	João Granate
RL	5	José Madeira
LL	4	Steevy Cerqueira		(substituted off) 78'
TP	3	Diogo Ferreira		(substituted off) 71'
HK	2	Mike Tadjer		(substituted off) 71'
LP	1	Francisco Fernandes	(yellow card) 60'
Replacements:
PR	16	David Costa		(substituted on) 66'	(substituted off) 70'
HK	17	Lionel Campergue		(substituted on) 71'
PR	18	António Costa		(substituted on) 71'
LK	19	José Rebelo de Andrade		(substituted on) 78'
FL	20	Nicolas Martins			(substituted on) 70'
SH	21	Pedro Lucas
FB	22	Vincent Pinto		(substituted on) 60'
WG	23	Simão Bento		(substituted on) 78'
Coach:
(France) Patrice Lagisquet

Assistant referees:
Damian Schneider (Argentina)
AJ Jacobs (South Africa)
Television match official:
Chris Hart (New Zealand)

Notes:

- José Lima (Portugal) earned his 50th test cap.
- This was the first draw between these two sides.
- With this result, Portugal qualify for the World Cup for the first time since 2007.
- With this result, USA miss the World Cup for the first time since 1995.
