= 2023 Rugby World Cup – Americas qualification =

Tournament details
- Dates: 26 June 2021 – 16 July 2022
- No. of nations: 7

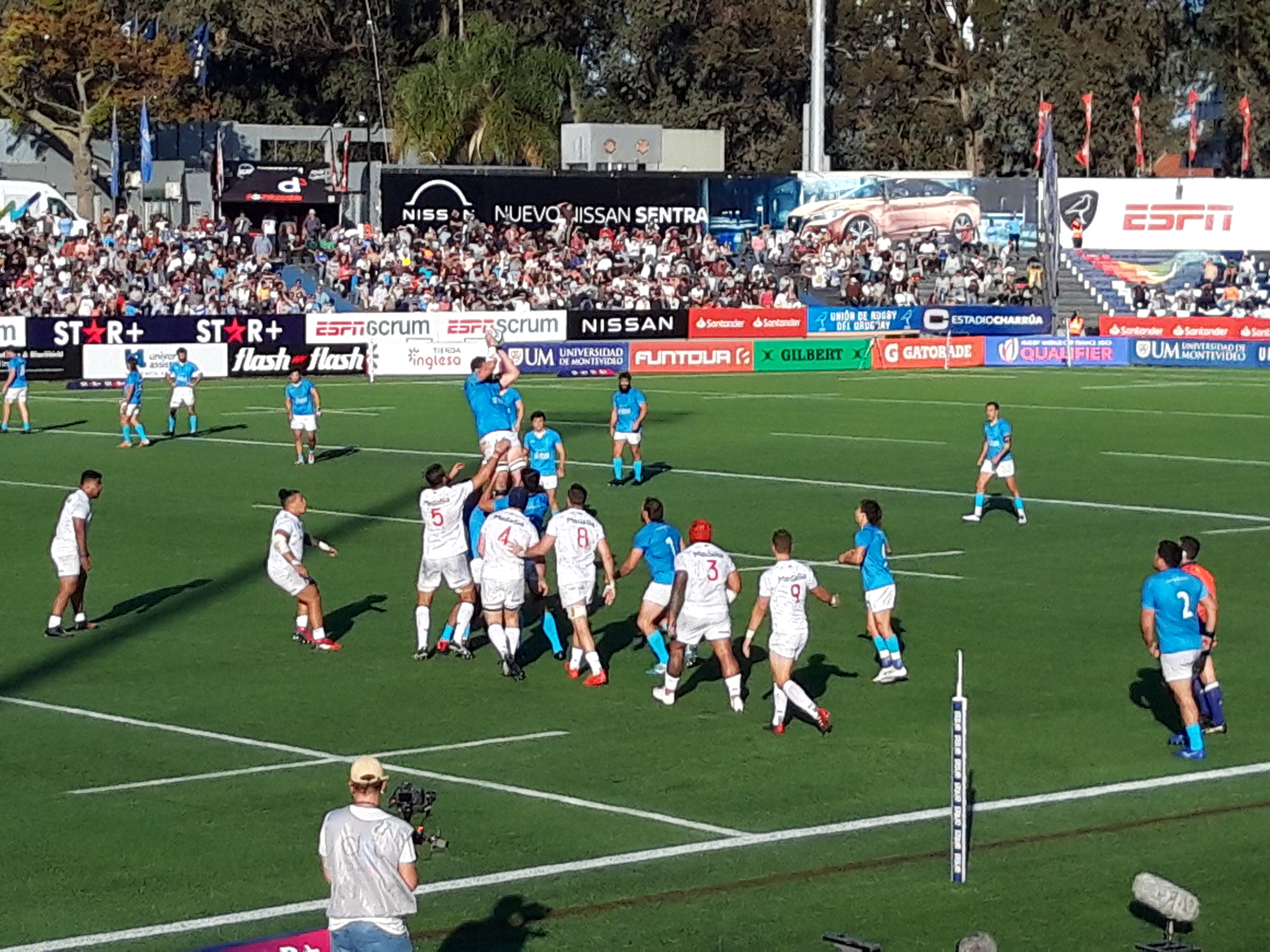
Uruguay vs United States

Qualifying for the 2023 Rugby World Cup for North and South America began in June 2021, with seven teams competing for two direct qualification spots into the final tournament and for one place in the Final Qualification Tournament.

For the first time since 2003 the Americas qualification process combined both North and South America to determine who qualifies as Americas. This is in different to past years where Americas 1 was a default winner between a play-off series between Canada and USA.

== Format ==
Qualifying began with two elimination matches between the bottom four ranked teams in South Americas; Brazil and Paraguay, and Chile and Colombia. The winners of this round moved on to join Uruguay in Round 2 in the 2021 South American Rugby Championship.

Round 2 was used to decide the winners of the North American region, a Canada vs USA play-off series, and the winners of the South American region, the 2021 Americas Rugby Championship. The winning sides, USA and Uruguay, then progressed to an Americas 1 decider to earn the right to qualify for the World Cup as Americas 1.

The runner-ups of the Regional matches then advanced to an Americas 2 repechage match with the winner of the repechage play-off matches, progressing to an Americas 2 play-off series against the loser of the Americas 1 play-off series.

The winner of this final match qualified as Americas 2, while the loser moved on to the Final Qualification Tournament as Americas 3.

== Entrants ==
Seven teams competed during the Americas qualifiers for the 2023 Rugby World Cup.

The Rugby Americas North entrants were reduced to just the United States and Canada, as holding the RAN Championship in 2020 and 2021 was not possible due to the COVID-19 pandemic.

Team World rankings taken prior to the first Americas qualifying match.

Teams in bold have previously competed in a Rugby World Cup.

Nation	Rank	Began play	Qualifying status
**Argentina**	9	N/A	Qualified with Top 12 finish at 2019 World Cup
Brazil	26	26 June 2021	Eliminated by Uruguay on 25 July 2021
**Canada**	23	4 September 2021	Eliminated by Chile on 9 October 2021
Chile	29	3 July 2021	Qualified as Americas 2 on 16 July 2022
Colombia	33	3 July 2021	Eliminated with game cancellation against Chile on 2 July 2021
Paraguay	46	26 June 2021	Eliminated by Brazil on 26 June 2021
**United States**	16	4 September 2021	Advanced to Final Qualification Tournament as Americas 3 on 16 July 2022
**Uruguay**	17	17 July 2021	Qualified as Americas 1 on 9 October 2021

== Round 1: South American qualifiers ==
Round 1 saw the four bottom-ranked teams in South America play-off for a qualification spot in the South American Championship to advance to Round 3 or 4 to earn the right to qualify as Americas 1 or 2. Brazil, Chile, Colombia, and Paraguay were seeded 1–4 (based on their World Rugby Rankings), where seed 1 would face seed 4 and seed 2 would face seed 3. Brazil (26) were seeded as 1, Chile (29) as 2, Colombia (33) as 3, and Paraguay (46) as 4. Brazil and Chile as the higher-ranked teams got home advantage.

The two winners from this round advanced to Round 2.

=== Game 1 ===
26 June 2021
19:00

Brazil	29–0	Paraguay
Try: Lucas Spago 64' c Felipe Sancery 80' c Con: Moisés Duque (2/2) 65', 80'; Pen: Moisés Duque (3/3) 2', 40', 49'; Drop: Moisés Duque (2/2) 42', 56'; Cards: Gabriel Paganini (yellow card) 28'	Report; WR Report	Cards: Camilo Orrego (yellow card) 54'

Estádio Martins Pereira, São José dos Campos
Attendance: 0
Referee: Damián Schneider (Argentina)

=== Game 2 ===
3 July 2021
17:10

Chile	Cancelled	Colombia
	WR Report

Estadio Elías Figueroa, Valparaíso
Referee: Francisco González (Uruguay)

- Game cancelled on 2 July 2021 due to COVID-19 cases in the Colombian team. Chile progressed to the next round as a result.

== Round 2: Regional Deciders ==
=== Round 2A: 2021 South American Championship ===
Round 2A saw the South American winner decided and advanced to Round 3 to earn the right to qualify for the World Cup as Americas 1 whilst the runners-up progress to Round 4 for an Americas 2 repechage play-off series to advance to Round 5 to earn the right to compete for a position as Americas 2.

All South American qualifying matches were held in Montevideo due to the COVID-19 pandemic.

Advances to Round 3 as South America 1
Advances to Round 4 as South America 2

Rank	Team	Games				Points			Bonus Points	Table Points
Rank	Team	Played	Won	Drawn	Lost	For	Against	Diff	Bonus Points	Table Points
1	Uruguay	2	2	0	0	51	23	+28	1	9
2	Chile	2	1	0	1	33	28	+5	1	5
3	Brazil	2	0	0	2	26	59	–33	0	0
Points were awarded to the teams as follows: Win – 4 points Draw – 1 points 4 or more tries – 1 point Loss within 7 points – 1 point Loss greater than 7 points – 0 points

11 July 2021
16:00

Brazil	13–23	Chile
Try: Daniel Lima 40'; Con: Moisés Duque (1/1) 40'; Pen: Moisés Duque (1/1) 48'; Drop: Felipe Sancery (1/1) 10'; Cards: Gabriel Paganini (yellow card) 20'	Report; WR Report	Try: Augusto Böhme 22', 61'; Con: Rodrigo Fernández (1/1) 23'; Francisco Urroz (1/1) 62'; Pen: Rodrigo Fernández (1/1) 46'; Francisco Urroz (2/2) 51', 71'

Estadio Charrúa, Montevideo
Attendance: 0
Referee: Gianluca Gnecchi (Italy)

17 July 2021
16:10

Uruguay	15–10	Chile (1 BP)
Try: Germán Kessler (2) 7′, 58′ Con: Felipe Berchesi (1/1) 8′ Pen: Felipe Berchesi (1/1) 44′	Report; WR Report	Try: Rodrigo Fernández 22′ Con: Santiago Videla (1/1) 23′ Pen: Santiago Videla (1/2) 18′

Estadio Charrúa, Montevideo
Attendance: 0
Referee: Andrea Piardi (Italy)

25 July 2021
16:10

(1 BP) Uruguay	36–13	Brazil
Try: Rodrigo Silva 17' m Gastón Mieres (3) 32' m, 49' c, 59' c Penalty try 66'; Juan Echeverría 77' m Con: Felipe Berchesi (1/4) 50'; Cards: Manuel Ardao (yellow card) 40'	Report; WR Report	Try: Penalty try 40'; Pen: Moisés Duque (2/3) 4', 22'; Cards: André Arruda (yellow card) 66'

Estadio Charrúa, Montevideo
Attendance: 0
Referee: Andrea Piardi (Italy)

=== Round 2B: Canada v United States play-off series ===
Round 2B decided North America 1 and advanced the United States to Round 3 to earn the right to compete for Americas 1. The runner-up (Canada as North America 2) progresses to an Americas 2 Repechage play-off match to face South America 2, Chile to decide who advances to the final stage of the Americas qualification process to earn the right to qualify as Americas 2.

This round saw the United States and Canada face off in a home-and-away play-off series, with the United States winning on aggregate 59–50.

Team 1	Agg.	Team 2	1st leg	2nd leg
Canada	50–59	United States	34–21	16–38

4 September 2021
15:00 NDT (UTC-2:30)

Canada	34–21	United States
Try: Thomas 8' c Rumball 42' c LeSage 51' c Webster 67' c Con: Nelson (4/4) 9', 42', 52', 69'; Pen: Nelson (2/3) 18', 62'	Report; WR Report	Try: Penalty try 3'; Germishuys 36' c Lopeti 80' c Con: Carty (1/1) 35'; MacGinty (1/1) 80'

Swiler’s Rugby Park, St. John's
Referee: Mike Adamson (Scotland)

Team details

FB	15	Cooper Coats		(substituted off) 69'
RW	14	Brock Webster
OC	13	Ben LeSage
IC	12	Spencer Jones
LW	11	Kainoa Lloyd
FH	10	Peter Nelson
SH	9	Ross Braude		(substituted off) 69'
N8	8	Siaki Vikilani
OF	7	Matt Heaton	(yellow card) 3'
BF	6	Lucas Rumball (c)
RL	5	Conor Keys	(yellow card) 19'	(substituted off) 69'
LL	4	Corey Thomas
TP	3	Matt Tierney		(substituted off) 62'
HK	2	Andrew Quattrin		(substituted off) 46'
LP	1	Djustice Sears-Duru		(substituted off) 62'
Replacements:
HK	16	Eric Howard		(substituted on) 46'
PR	17	Cole Keith		(substituted on) 62'
PR	18	Tyler Rowland		(substituted on) 62'
FL	19	Mason Flesch		(substituted on) 69'
FL	20	Michael Smith
FH	21	Robbie Povey
SH	22	Jason Higgins		(substituted on) 69'
FB	23	Pat Parfrey		(substituted on) 69'
Coach:
(Wales) Kingsley Jones

FB	15	Luke Carty				(substituted off) 75'
RW	14	Christian Dyer
OC	13	Marcel Brache
IC	12	Bryce Campbell (c)
LW	11	Mika Kruse	(substituted off) 34'
FH	10	Will Magie	(substituted off) 40'
SH	9	Ruben de Haas
N8	8	Cam Dolan	(substituted off) 37'
OF	7	Jamason Faʻanana-Schultz
BF	6	Hanco Germishuys
RL	5	Nick Civetta	(substituted off) 69'
LL	4	Nate Brakeley
TP	3	Paul Mullen	(substituted off) 65'
HK	2	Dylan Fawsitt	(substituted off) 52'
LP	1	Chance Wenglewski	(substituted off) 52'
Replacements:
HK	16	Kapeli Pifeleti	(substituted on) 52'
PR	17	David Ainu'u	(substituted on) 52'
PR	18	Joe Taufete'e	(substituted on) 65'
LK	19	Siaosi Mahoni	(substituted on) 69'
FL	20	Andrew Guerra	(substituted on) 37'
SH	21	Nate Augspurger	(substituted on) 34'	54' to 62'
CE	22	Tavite Lopeti		(substituted on) 54'	(substituted off) 62'	(substituted on) 75'
FH	23	AJ MacGinty	(substituted on) 40'
Coach:
(South Africa) Gary Gold

Man of the Match:
Matt Heaton (Canada)

Assistant Referees:
Moe Chaudhry (Canada)
Robin Kaluzniak (Canada)
Television match official:
Chris Assmus (Canada)

Notes:

- Mason Flesch, Jason Higgins, Spencer Jones, and Brock Webster (all Canada) and Tavite Lopeti (United States) made their international debuts.
- Canada defeated the United States for the first time since their 13–11 win in 2013.

11 September 2021
19:00 MDT (UTC-06)

United States	38–16	Canada
Try: Germishuys (3) 17' m, 28' m, 40' c Dyer 22' m de Haas 51' m Taufete'e 63' m Con: MacGinty (1/6) 40'; Pen: MacGinty (1/6) 4'; Drop: de Haas (1/1) 49'	Report; WR Report	Try: Penalty try 80'; Pen: Coats (1/1) 6'; Nelson (2/2) 9', 32'

Infinity Park, Glendale, Colorado
Referee: Mike Adamson (Scotland)

Team details

FB	15	Marcel Brache		(substituted off) 62'
RW	14	Christian Dyer		(substituted off) 77'
OC	13	Tavita Lopeti
IC	12	Bryce Campbell
LW	11	Ryan Matyas
FH	10	AJ MacGinty (c)
SH	9	Ruben de Haas		(substituted off) 77'
N8	8	Cam Dolan		(substituted off) 75'
OF	7	Hanco Germishuys
BF	6	Jamason Faʻanana-Schultz	(yellow card) 11' (red card) 80'
RL	5	Nick Civetta
LL	4	Nate Brakeley		(substituted off) 74'
TP	3	Joe Taufete'e		(substituted off) 66'
HK	2	Kapeli Pifeleti		(substituted off) 66'
LP	1	David Ainu'u		(substituted off) 66'	(substituted on) 77'
Replacements:
HK	16	Dylan Fawsitt		(substituted on) 66'
PR	17	Chance Wenglewski		(substituted on) 66'	(substituted off) 77'
PR	18	Paul Mullen		(substituted on) 66'
LK	19	Siaosi Mahoni		(substituted on) 74'
FL	20	Andrew Guerra		(substituted on) 75'
SH	21	Nate Augspurger		(substituted on) 77'
FH	22	Will Magie		(substituted on) 62'
FB	23	Mike Dabulas		(substituted on) 77'
Coach:
(South Africa) Gary Gold

FB	15	Cooper Coats
RW	14	Brock Webster
OC	13	Ben LeSage
IC	12	Spencer Jones
LW	11	Kainoa Lloyd
FH	10	Peter Nelson	(substituted off) 66'
SH	9	Ross Braude	(substituted off) 64'
N8	8	Siaki Vikilani	(substituted off) 67'
OF	7	Matt Heaton	(substituted off) 50'
BF	6	Lucas Rumball (c)
RL	5	Conor Keys
LL	4	Corey Thomas
TP	3	Matt Tierney	(substituted off) 40'
HK	2	Andrew Quattrin	(substituted off) 40'
LP	1	Djustice Sears-Duru	(substituted off) 57'
Replacements:
HK	16	Eric Howard	(substituted on) 40'
PR	17	Cole Keith	(substituted on) 57'
PR	18	Tyler Rowland	(substituted on) 40'
LK	19	Kyle Baillie	(substituted on) 50'
FL	20	Michael Smith	(substituted on) 67'
FH	21	Robbie Povey	(substituted on) 66'
SH	22	Jason Higgins	(substituted on) 64'
FB	23	Pat Parfrey
Coach:
(Wales) Kingsley Jones

Assistant Referees:
Scott Green (United States)
Luke Rogan (United States)
Television match official:
Derek Summers (United States)

== Round 3: Americas 1 decider ==
Round 3 saw Americas 1 decided, where North America 1 faced South America 1 in a home-and-away play-off series to earn the top spot from the Americas region. The runner-up by default got a second chance at qualification by moving to Round 5: Americas 2 play-off. On 9 October 2021, Uruguay qualified as Americas 1, winning the series 50–34 on aggregate.

Team 1	Agg.	Team 2	1st leg	2nd leg
United States	34–50	Uruguay	19–16	15–34

2 October 2021
18:00 MDT (UTC-06)

United States	19–16	Uruguay
Try: Dolan 20' c Dyer 39' c Kruse 50' m Con: Magie (2/3) 21', 40'	Report; WR Report	Try: Pujadas 78' c Con: Berchesi (1/1) 79'; Pen: Berchesi (3/3) 9', 63', 70'

Infinity Park, Glendale, Colorado
Referee: Frank Murphy (Ireland)

Team details

FB	15	Marcel Brache
RW	14	Christian Dyer
OC	13	Tavita Lopeti
IC	12	Bryce Campbell (c)
LW	11	Mika Kruse	(substituted off) 50'
FH	10	Will Magie	(substituted off) 72'
SH	9	Ruben de Haas	(substituted off) 65'
N8	8	Cam Dolan	(substituted off) 76'
OF	7	Andrew Guerra
BF	6	Hanco Germishuys
RL	5	Nick Civetta
LL	4	Nate Brakeley	(substituted off) 60'
TP	3	Joe Taufete'e	(substituted off) 52'
HK	2	Kapeli Pifeleti	(substituted off) 71'
LP	1	David Ainu'u	(substituted off) 77'
Replacements:
HK	16	Dylan Fawsitt	(substituted on) 71'
PR	17	Matt Harmon	(substituted on) 77'
PR	18	Paul Mullen	(substituted on) 52'
LK	19	Greg Peterson	(substituted on) 60'
FL	20	Moni Tonga’uiha	(substituted on) 76'
SH	21	Nate Augspurger	(substituted on) 65'
FH	22	Luke Carty	(substituted on) 72'
FB	23	Will Hooley	(substituted on) 50'
Coach:
(South Africa) Gary Gold

FB	15	Felipe Echeverry	(substituted off) 70'
RW	14	Rodrigo Silva	(substituted off) 51'
OC	13	Nicolás Freitas
IC	12	Andrés Vilaseca (c)
LW	11	Gastón Mieres
FH	10	Felipe Berchesi
SH	9	Santiago Arata	(substituted off) 60'
N8	8	Manuel Diana	(substituted off) 57'
OF	7	Santiago Civetta
BF	6	Manuel Ardao
RL	5	Manuel Leindekar
LL	4	Ignacio Dotti	(substituted off) 65'
TP	3	Diego Arbelo	(substituted off) 60'
HK	2	Facundo Gattas	(substituted off) 65'
LP	1	Mateo Sanguinetti	(substituted off) 65'
Replacements:
HK	16	Guillermo Pujadas	(substituted on) 65'
PR	17	Juan Echeverría	(substituted on) 60'
PR	18	Matías Benítez	(substituted on) 65'
LK	19	Diego Magno	(substituted on) 65'
FL	20	Eric Dosantos	(substituted on) 57'
SH	21	Tomás Inciarte	(substituted on) 60'
WG	22	Federico Favaro	(substituted on) 51'
CE	23	Felipe Arcos Perez	(substituted on) 70'
Coach:
(Argentina) Esteban Meneses

Assistant Referees:
Peter Martin (Ireland)
Scott Green (United States)
Television match official:
Derek Summers (United States)

Notes:

- Moni Tonga’uiha (United States) made his international debut.

9 October 2021
16:30 UYT (UTC-03)

Uruguay	34–15	United States
Try: Silva (2) 5' c, 55' c Mieres 42' c Gattas 48' c Con: Favaro (4/4) 6', 43', 49', 56'; Pen: Favaro (2/2) 34', 38'	Report; WR Report	Try: Kruse 28' m Dyer 64' c Con: Carty (1/1) 65'; Pen: Magie (1/1) 9'

Estadio Charrúa, Montevideo
Referee: Damian Schneider (Argentina)

Team details

FB	15	Rodrigo Silva
RW	14	Federico Favaro
OC	13	Nicolás Freitas	(substituted off) 62'
IC	12	Andrés Vilaseca (c)
LW	11	Gastón Mieres
FH	10	Felipe Echeverry
SH	9	Santiago Arata	(substituted off) 56'
N8	8	Manuel Diana
OF	7	Santiago Civetta	(substituted off) 62'
BF	6	Manuel Ardao
RL	5	Manuel Leindekar	(substituted off) 73'
LL	4	Ignacio Dotti	(substituted off) 68'
TP	3	Diego Arbelo	(substituted off) 70'
HK	2	Facundo Gattas	(substituted off) 72'
LP	1	Mateo Sanguinetti	(substituted off) 75'
Replacements:
HK	16	Guillermo Pujadas	(substituted on) 72'
PR	17	Juan Echeverría	(substituted on) 70'
PR	18	Matías Benítez	(substituted on) 75'
LK	19	Diego Magno	(substituted on) 68'
FL	20	Franco Lamanna	(substituted on) 73'
FL	21	Eric Dosantos	(substituted on) 62'
SH	22	Tomás Inciarte	(substituted on) 56'
CE	23	Felipe Arcos Perez	(substituted on) 62'
Coach:
(Argentina) Esteban Meneses

FB	15	Marcel Brache	(substituted off) 35'
RW	14	Christian Dyer
OC	13	Bryce Campbell (c)
IC	12	Tavita Lopeti
LW	11	Mika Kruse
FH	10	Will Magie	(substituted off) 49'
SH	9	Ruben de Haas	(substituted off) 56'
N8	8	Cam Dolan
OF	7	Jamason Faʻanana-Schultz	(substituted off) 50'
BF	6	Andrew Guerra
RL	5	Nick Civetta
LL	4	Nate Brakeley	(substituted off) 49'
TP	3	Joe Taufete'e	(substituted off) 56'
HK	2	Kapeli Pifeleti	(substituted off) 56'
LP	1	David Ainu'u	(substituted off) 56'
Replacements:
HK	16	Dylan Fawsitt	(substituted on) 56'
PR	17	Matt Harmon	(substituted on) 56'
PR	18	Paul Mullen	(substituted on) 56'
LK	19	Greg Peterson	(substituted on) 49'
FL	20	Benjamín Bonasso	(substituted on) 50'
SH	21	Nate Augspurger	(substituted on) 56'
FH	22	Luke Carty	(substituted on) 49'
FB	23	Will Hooley	(substituted on) 35'
Coach:
(South Africa) Gary Gold

Assistant Referees:
Tomas Bertazza (Argentina)
Ricardo Caua (Brazil)
Television match official:
Santiago Borsani (Argentina)

Notes:

- Uruguay qualify for the Rugby World Cup as Americas 1 for the first time.
- This was Uruguay's biggest winning margin over the United States.
- Benjamín Bonasso (United States) made his international debut.

== Round 4: Americas 2 Repechage ==
Round 4 saw the runner-up of Round 2A (South America 2) play-off against the loser of Round 2B (North America 2) in a home and away play-off series to decide who progresses to the Americas 2 qualifier. On 9 October 2021, Chile progressed to the next round, beating Canada 54–46 on aggregate. As a result, Canada failed to reach a Rugby World Cup for the first time in history.

Team 1	Agg.	Team 2	1st leg	2nd leg
Canada	46–54	Chile	22–21	24–33

2 October 2021
17:00 PDT (UTC-07)

Canada	22–21	Chile
Try: Thomas 34' m Braude (2) 44' c, 49' c Con: Nelson (2/3) 45', 50'; Pen: Povey (1/1) 80'	Report; WR Report	Try: Saavedra (2) 52' m, 66' c Con: Videla (1/2) 67'; Pen: Videla (3/4) 22', 31', 40'

Starlight Stadium, Langford
Referee: Chris Busby (Ireland)

Team details

FB	15	Cooper Coats
RW	14	Brock Webster
OC	13	Ben LeSage
IC	12	Spencer Jones
LW	11	Kainoa Lloyd
FH	10	Peter Nelson		(substituted off) 66'
SH	9	Ross Braude
N8	8	Siaki Vikilani
OF	7	Matt Heaton
BF	6	Lucas Rumball (c)
RL	5	Kyle Baillie		(substituted off) 67'
LL	4	Corey Thomas
TP	3	Tyler Rowland	(yellow card) 51'	(substituted off) 66'
HK	2	Eric Howard		(substituted off) 66'
LP	1	Djustice Sears-Duru		(substituted off) 66'
Replacements:
HK	16	Andrew Quattrin		(substituted on) 66'
PR	17	Cole Keith		(substituted on) 66'
PR	18	Jake Ilnicki		(substituted on) 66'
LK	19	Conor Keys		(substituted on) 67'
FL	20	Michael Smith
SH	21	Jason Higgins
FH	22	Robbie Povey		(substituted on) 66'
FB	23	Pat Parfrey
Coach:
(Wales) Kingsley Jones

FB	15	Santiago Videla
RW	14	Nicolás Garafulic		(substituted off) 60'
OC	13	Domingo Saavedra
IC	12	Matías Garafulic
LW	11	Franco Velarde
FH	10	Rodrigo Fernández
SH	9	Marcelo Torrealba		(substituted off) 63'
N8	8	Alfonso Escobar
OF	7	Raimundo Martínez
BF	6	Martín Sigren (c)
RL	5	Javier Eissmann		(substituted off) 69'
LL	4	Clemente Saavedra
TP	3	Matías Dittus		(substituted off) 69'
HK	2	Augusto Böhme		(substituted off) 50'
LP	1	Vittorio Lastra		(substituted off) 50'
Replacements:
HK	16	Tomás Dussaillant		(substituted on) 50'
PR	17	Javier Carrasco	(yellow card) 59'	(substituted on) 50'
PR	18	Salvador Lues		(substituted on) 69'
LK	19	Augusto Sarmiento		(substituted on) 69'
FL	20	Santiago Pedrer
FL	21	Thomas Orchard
CE	22	Iñaki Ayarza		(substituted on) 60'
SH	23	Nicolás Herreros		(substituted on) 63'
Coach:
(Uruguay) Pablo Lemoine

Assistant Referees:
Sean Gallagher (Ireland)
Moe Chaudhry (Canada)
Television match official:
Chris Assmus (Canada)

9 October 2021
15:00 CLST (UTC-03)

Chile	33–24	Canada
Try: Fernández 24' c Dittus 50' c Videla 69' c Con: Videla (3/3) 25', 51', 70'; Pen: Videla (4/4) 8', 17', 34', 60'	Report; WR Report	Try: Howard 46' c Quattrin 66' c Lloyd 79' c Con: Nelson (2/2) 47', 67'; Povey 80'; Pen: Nelson (1/1) 5'

Estadio Elías Figueroa, Valparaíso
Referee: Neheun Jauri Rivero (Argentina) (Note: Replaces Mathieu Raynal of France after Raynal was unable to obtain a quarantine exemption to enter Chile.)

Team details

FB	15	Santiago Videla
RW	14	Nicolás Garafulic		(substituted off) 55'	(substituted on) 57'
OC	13	Domingo Saavedra		(substituted off) 75'
IC	12	Matías Garafulic
LW	11	Franco Velarde
FH	10	Rodrigo Fernández		(substituted off) 66'
SH	9	Marcelo Torrealba
N8	8	Alfonso Escobar
OF	7	Raimundo Martínez
BF	6	Martín Sigren (c)
RL	5	Javier Eissmann		(substituted off) 66'
LL	4	Clemente Saavedra
TP	3	Matías Dittus		(substituted off) 66'
HK	2	Augusto Böhme	(yellow card) 47'			(substituted off) 66'
LP	1	Javier Carrasco		(substituted off) 47'
Replacements:
HK	16	Tomás Dussaillant		(substituted on) 55'	(substituted off) 57'	(substituted on) 66'
PR	17	Vittorio Lastra		(substituted on) 47'
PR	18	Salvador Lues	(yellow card) 74'	(substituted on) 66'
LK	19	Augusto Sarmiento		(substituted on) 66'
FL	20	Thomas Orchard
CE	21	Iñaki Ayarza
CE	22	José Ignacio Larenas		(substituted on) 75'
SH	23	Nicolás Herreros		(substituted on) 66'
Coach:
(Uruguay) Pablo Lemoine

FB	15	Pat Parfrey
RW	14	Brock Webster
OC	13	Ben LeSage
IC	12	Spencer Jones
LW	11	Kainoa Lloyd
FH	10	Peter Nelson		(substituted off) 70'
SH	9	Ross Braude		(substituted off) 70'
N8	8	Siaki Vikilani		(substituted off) 61'
OF	7	Lucas Rumball (c)
BF	6	Tyler Ardron
RL	5	Kyle Baillie
LL	4	Corey Thomas
TP	3	Tyler Rowland		(substituted off) 58'
HK	2	Eric Howard		(substituted off) 58'
LP	1	Djustice Sears-Duru	(yellow card) 59'	(substituted off) 69'
Replacements:
HK	16	Andrew Quattrin		(substituted on) 58'
PR	17	Cole Keith		(substituted on) 61'
PR	18	Matt Tierney		(substituted on) 58'
LK	19	Conor Keys		(substituted on) 69'
FL	20	Michael Smith
FH	21	Robbie Povey		(substituted on) 70'
SH	22	Jason Higgins		(substituted on) 70'
CE	23	Quinn Ngawati
Coach:
(Wales) Kingsley Jones

Assistant Referees:
Francisco Gonzale (Uruguay)
Gonzalo De Achaval (Argentina)
Television match official:
Gabriel Pinter (Argentina)

Notes:

- This was Chile's first ever victory over Canada.

== Round 5: Americas 2 qualifier ==
The winner of Round 5, Chile, qualified for the World Cup as Americas 2. The loser, United States, advanced to the Final Qualification Tournament as Americas 3.

Team 1	Agg.	Team 2	1st leg	2nd leg
Chile	52–51	United States	21–22	31–29

9 July 2022
18:00 CLT (UTC–04)

Chile	21–22	United States
Try: Fernández 51' m Videla 80' c Con: Videla (1/1) 80+1'; Pen: Videla (3/3) 18', 23', 57'	WR Report	Try: Dyer 7' c Taufeteʻe 45' m Pifeleti 74' c Con: MacGinty (2/3) 8', 75'; Pen: MacGinty (1/2) 67'

Estadio Santa Laura-Universidad SEK, Santiago
Attendance: 12,500
Referee: Nic Berry (Australia)

Team details

FB	15	Santiago Videla	(yellow card) 44'
RW	14	Nicolas Garafulic
OC	13	Matías Garafulic
IC	12	José Larenas
LW	11	Franco Velarde		(substituted off) 44'
FH	10	Rodrigo Fernández
SH	9	Lukas Carvallo
N8	8	Raimundo Martínez
OF	7	Clemente Saavedra
BF	6	Martín Sigren (c)
RL	5	Javier Eissmann		(substituted off) 44'
LL	4	Santiago Pedrero		(substituted off) 60'
TP	3	Matías Dittus		(substituted off) 56'
HK	2	Augusto Böhme		(substituted off) 56'
LP	1	Javier Carrasco		(substituted off) 56'
Replacements:
HK	16	Diego Escobar		(substituted on) 56'
PR	17	Salvador Lues		(substituted on) 56'
PR	18	Vittorio Lastra		(substituted on) 56'
LK	19	Augusto Sarmiento		(substituted on) 60'
FL	20	Thomas Orchard		(substituted on) 60'
FL	21	Ignacio Silva		(substituted on) 44'
FH	22	Luca Strabucchi		(substituted on) 44'
SH	23	Marcelo Torrealba
Coach:
(Uruguay) Pablo Lemoine

FB	15	Marcel Brache
RW	14	Christian Dyer
OC	13	Tavite Lopeti
IC	12	Bryce Campbell
LW	11	Martin Iosefo	(substituted off) 68'
FH	10	AJ MacGinty (c)
SH	9	Ruben de Haas	(substituted off) 75'
N8	8	Cam Dolan
OF	7	Hanco Germishuys
BF	6	Benjamín Bonasso	(substituted off) 62'
RL	5	Nick Civetta	(substituted off) 58'
LL	4	Greg Peterson	(substituted off) 77'
TP	3	Paul Mullen	(substituted off) 75'
HK	2	Joe Taufeteʻe	(substituted off) 68'
LP	1	David Ainuʻu	(substituted off) 75'
Replacements:
HK	16	Kapeli Pifeleti	(substituted on) 68'
PR	17	Chance Wenglewski	(substituted on) 75'
PR	18	Angus MacLellan	(substituted on) 75'
LK	19	Siaosi Mahoni	(substituted on) 58'
FL	20	Jason Damm	(substituted on) 62'
FL	21	David Tameilau	(substituted on) 77'
SH	22	Nate Augspurger	(substituted on) 75'
FH	23	Luke Carty	(substituted on) 68'
Coach:
(South Africa) Gary Gold

Assistant referees:
Hollie Davidson (Scotland)
Talal Chaudhry (Canada)
Television match official:
Marius Jonker (South Africa)

Notes:

- Diego Escobar (Chile) and Jason Damm (United States) made their international debuts.

16 July 2022
13:00 MDT (UTC–06)

United States	29–31	Chile
Try: Iosefo (2) 10' c, 21' c MacGinty 31' m Taufeteʻe 47' c Con: MacGinty (3/4) 11', 23', 48'; Pen: MacGinty (1/1) 58'	Report; WR Report	Try: Torrealba 33' c M. Garafulic 39' c Videla 51' c Dittus 63' c Con: Videla (4/4) 35', 39', 51', 64'; Pen: Videla (1/2) 75'

Infinity Park, Glendale, Colorado
Attendance: 5,000
Referee: Luke Pearce (England)

Team details

FB	15	Marcel Brache
RW	14	Christian Dyer
OC	13	Tavite Lopeti
IC	12	Bryce Campbell
LW	11	Martin Iosefo
FH	10	AJ MacGinty (c)
SH	9	Ruben de Haas		(substituted off) 71'
N8	8	Cam Dolan
OF	7	Hanco Germishuys
BF	6	Benjamín Bonasso
RL	5	Nick Civetta	(yellow card) 32'	(substituted off) 57'
LL	4	Greg Peterson		(substituted off) 64'
TP	3	Paul Mullen		(substituted off) 66'
HK	2	Joe Taufeteʻe		(substituted off) 55'
LP	1	David Ainuʻu		(substituted off) 66'
Replacements:
HK	16	Mike Sosene-Feagai		(substituted on) 55'
PR	17	Chance Wenglewski		(substituted on) 66'
PR	18	Angus MacLellan		(substituted on) 66'
LK	19	Siaosi Mahoni		(substituted on) 64'
FL	20	Jason Damm		(substituted on) 57'
FL	21	Moni Tonga’uiha
SH	22	Nate Augspurger		(substituted on) 71'
FH	23	Luke Carty
Coach:
(South Africa) Gary Gold

FB	15	Francisco Urroz
RW	14	Nicolas Garafulic
OC	13	Matías Garafulic
IC	12	Pablo Casas
LW	11	Santiago Videla
FH	10	Rodrigo Fernández
SH	9	Marcelo Torrealba	(substituted off) 61'
N8	8	Alfonso Escobar
OF	7	Ignacio Silva	(substituted off) 59'
BF	6	Martín Sigren (c)
RL	5	Javier Eissmann	(substituted off) 61'
LL	4	Thomas Orchard	(substituted off) 40'
TP	3	Vittorio Lastra	(substituted off) 40'
HK	2	Diego Escobar	(substituted off) 51'
LP	1	Salvador Lues	(substituted off) 59'
Replacements:
HK	16	Augusto Böhme	(substituted on) 51'
PR	17	Javier Carrasco	(substituted on) 59'
PR	18	Matías Dittus	(substituted on) 40'
LK	19	Augusto Sarmiento	(substituted on) 61'
LK	20	Clemente Saavedra	(substituted on) 40'
FL	21	Raimundo Martínez	(substituted on) 59'
CE	22	José Ignacio Larenas
SH	23	Lukas Carvallo	(substituted on) 61'
Coach:
(Uruguay) Pablo Lemoine

Assistant referees:
Andrea Piardi (Italy)
Christopher Chopra Micheletti (Canada)
Television match official:
Stuart Terheege (England)

Notes:

- Chile qualify for their first Rugby World Cup on aggregate score, 52–51.
- This was Chile's first away win over the United States and their first since 2002.

== See also ==
- 2023 Rugby World Cup – Regional play-off and Final Qualification Tournament
- South American Rugby Championship
- Rugby Americas North Championship
- Rugby Americas North
- Sudamerica Rugby
