= List of 2025–26 Major League Rugby transfers =

This is a list of player transfers involving Major League Rugby teams that occurred from the end of the 2025 season and through the 2026 season. Houston SaberCats, Miami Sharks, New Orleans Gold, RFC Los Angeles, San Diego Legion and Utah Warriors have pulled out from the competition for the 2026 season. California Legion was established in July 2025 as a merger between two of the MLR teams.

== Anthem RC ==
=== Players In ===
- (United States) Luke Carty from (United States) New Orleans Gold
- (United States) Malacchi Esdale from (United States) Seattle Seawolves
- (United States) Elias Garza from (United States) Chicago Hounds
- (Australia) Baden Godfrey from (Australia) Northern Suburbs
- (New Zealand) Zion Going from (United States) Utah Warriors
- (United States) Marques Fuala'au from (United States) Miami Sharks
- (Argentina) Ramiro Gurovich from (Argentina) Pampas XV
- (Ireland) Alessandro Heaney from (England) Cornish Pirates
- (New Zealand) Campbell Hobb from (United States) Central Washington University
- (United States) Oliver Kane from (United States) San Diego Legion
- (Ireland) Will Leonard from (United States) RFC Los Angeles
- (South Africa) Johan Momsen from (United States) Houston SaberCats
- (England) Tom Pittman from (France) Chartres
- (United States) Julian Roberts from (United States) New Orleans Gold
- (England) James Scott from (United States) Chicago Hounds
- (United States) Will Sherman from (United States) University of California, Los Angeles
- (United States) Seth Smith from (United States) Houston SaberCats
- (United States) Payton Telea-Ilalio from (United States) San Diego Legion
- (United States) Moni Tongaʻuiha from (United States) New Orleans Gold
- (New Zealand) Jordan Trainor from (United States) Utah Warriors
- (United States) Dom Akina from (United States) Houston SaberCats

=== Players Out ===
- (United States) Toby Fricker to (England) Bristol Bears
- (United States) Line Latu to (United States) New England Free Jacks
- (United States) Mitch Wilson to (United States) New England Free Jacks
- (United States) Jake Turnbull to (United States) Chicago Hounds
- (United States) Jason Tidwell to (United States) Chicago Hounds

== California Legion ==
=== Players In ===
- (United States) Christian Poidevin from (United States) San Diego Legion
- (United States) Jason Damm from (United States) RFC Los Angeles
- (United States) Joe Taufete'e from (United States) New Orleans Gold
- (United States) Ryan James from (United States) San Diego Legion
- (United States) Cassh Maluia from (United States) San Diego Legion
- (Australia) Bill Meakes from (United States) RFC Los Angeles
- (Argentina) Gonzalo Bertranou from (United States) RFC Los Angeles
- (England) Ed Timpson from (England) Cambridge
- (England) Ben Sugars from (United States) RFC Los Angeles
- (New Zealand) Rory van Vugt from (United States) RFC Los Angeles
- (Australia) Ben Houston from (United States) RFC Los Angeles
- (United States) Justus Tavai from (United States) RFC Los Angeles
- (United States) Tas Smith from (United States) RFC Los Angeles
- (United States) Matt Anticev from (United States) RFC Los Angeles
- (Tonga) Ma'aki Muti from (United States) Miami Sharks
- (United States) Steffan Crimp from (United States) San Diego Legion
- (United States) Lance Williams from (United States) Utah Warriors
- (Samoa) Fred Apulu from (United States) Utah Warriors
- (United States) Cole Semu from (United States) Utah Warriors
- (Australia) Nick Chan from (United States) RFC Los Angeles
- (New Zealand) Coby Miln from (Australia) Western Force
- (United States) Tonga Kofe from (England) Leicester Tigers

== Chicago Hounds ==
=== Players In ===
- (United States) Tavite Lopeti from (United States) San Diego Legion
- (Australia) Nathan Den Hoedt from (United States) Houston SaberCats
- (Chile) Santiago Videla from (United States) Miami Sharks
- (United States) Ruben de Haas from (United States) New Orleans Gold
- (South Africa) Davy Coetzer from (United States) Houston SaberCats
- (United States) Malcolm May from (United States) New Orleans Gold
- (Australia) Theo Fourie from (Australia) Queensland Reds
- (Canada) Brock Webster from (United States) New England Free Jacks
- (South Africa) Tiaan Botha from (United States) San Diego Legion
- (United States) Jake Turnbull from (United States) Anthem RC
- (United States) Brandon Harvey from (United States) San Diego Legion
- (United States) Emmanuel Albert from (United States) Houston SaberCats
- (South Africa) Reece Botha from (United States) New Orleans Gold
- (Argentina) Tomas Bekerman from (United States) Miami Sharks
- (United States) Jason Tidwell from (United States) Anthem RC
- (Brazil) Wilton Rebolo from (United States) Houston SaberCats
- (United States) Tomás Casares from (United States) Miami Sharks

=== Players Out ===
- (United States) Bryce Campbell (retired)
- (United States) Elias Garza to (United States) Anthem RC
- (England) James Scott to (United States) Anthem RC
- (United States) Nate Augspurger (retired)
- (Uruguay) Ignacio Péculo to (United States) Seattle Seawolves
- (Ireland) Michael Hand to (United States) Seattle Seawolves

== Houston SaberCats ==
=== Players Out ===
- (New Zealand) Sam Tuifua to (France) Mont-de-Marsan
- (United States) Max Schumacher to (United States) Old Glory DC
- (Australia) Nathan Den Hoedt to (United States) Chicago Hounds
- (United States) Emmanuel Albert to (United States) Chicago Hounds
- (England) Sam Hill (retired)
- (South Africa) Johan Momsen to (United States) Anthem RC
- (United States) Seth Smith to (United States) Anthem RC
- (South Africa) Davy Coetzer to (United States) Seattle Seawolves
- (South Africa) Marno Redelinghuys to (United States) Seattle Seawolves
- (Brazil) Wilton Rebolo to (United States) Chicago Hounds
- (United States) Ezekiel Lindenmuth to (United States) Seattle Seawolves
- (United States) Rufus McLean to (United States) Seattle Seawolves
- (South Africa) André Warner to (United States) Seattle Seawolves
- (United States) LaRome White to (United States) Seattle Seawolves
- (United States) Dom Akina to (United States) Anthem RC
- (United States) Drake Davis to (United States) Seattle Seawolves

== Los Angeles ==
=== Players Out ===
- (Australia) Tim Anstee to (England) Worcester Warriors
- (New Zealand) Reece MacDonald to (Japan) Green Rockets Tokatsu
- (Ireland) Alessandro Heaney to (England) Cornish Pirates
- (Australia) Christian Leali'ifano to (Japan) Toyota Industries Shuttles Aichi
- (United States) Christian Dyer (retired)
- (Ireland) Will Leonard to (United States) Anthem RC
- (United States) Paddy Beattie to (United States) Old Glory DC
- (Fiji) Semi Kunatani to (United States) Old Glory DC
- (United States) Maliu Niuafe to (United States) New England Free Jacks
- (United States) Jason Damm to (United States) California Legion
- (Australia) Bill Meakes to (United States) California Legion
- (Argentina) Gonzalo Bertranou to (United States) California Legion
- (England) Ben Sugars to (United States) California Legion
- (New Zealand) Rory van Vugt to (United States) California Legion
- (Australia) Ben Houston to (United States) California Legion
- (United States) Justus Tavai to (United States) California Legion
- (United States) Tas Smith to (United States) California Legion
- (United States) Matt Anticev to (United States) California Legion
- (Australia) Nick Chan to (United States) California Legion

== Miami Sharks ==
=== Players Out ===
- (Argentina) Benjamín Bonasso to (United States) Old Glory DC
- (United States) Rick Rose to (United States) Old Glory DC
- (Chile) Santiago Videla to (United States) Chicago Hounds
- (United States) Marques Fuala'au to (United States) Anthem RC
- (Argentina) Tomas Bekerman to (United States) Chicago Hounds
- (United States) Tomás Casares to (United States) Chicago Hounds
- (United States) Braemar Murray to (United States) New England Free Jacks
- (United States) Sean McNulty to (United States) Seattle Seawolves
- (Uruguay) Manuel Ardao to (Uruguay) Peñarol
- (Tonga) Ma'aki Muti to (United States) California Legion

== New England Free Jacks ==
=== Players In ===
- (Australia) Ollie Aylmer from (Australia) ACT Brumbies
- (Fiji) Cyrille Cama from (United States) San Diego Legion
- (New Zealand) Tayne Hemopo from (New Zealand) Tasman
- (New Zealand) Kienan Higgins from (Scotland) Edinburgh
- (England) Joel Hodgson from (United States) Utah Warriors
- (United States) Line Latu from (United States) Anthem RC
- (Australia) Max Lehmann from (Australia) Wests Tigers (Rugby League)
- (United States) Alex Mackenzie from (Japan) Urayasu D-Rocks
- (United States) Ethan McVeigh from (United States) Old Glory DC
- (United States) Braemar Murray from (United States) Miami Sharks
- (United States) Maliu Niuafe from (United States) RFC Los Angeles
- (New Zealand) Jacob Norris from (New Zealand) Bay of Plenty
- (New Zealand) Reuben Palmer from (New Zealand) Dunedin Sharks
- (New Zealand) Nathan Salmon from (New Zealand) Northland
- (United States) Nathan Sylvia from (United States) San Diego Legion
- (Tonga) Sione Tupou from (New Zealand) Bay of Plenty
- (New Zealand) Filipe Vakasiuola from (New Zealand) Bay of Plenty
- (United States) Bailey Wilson from (United States) Utah Warriors
- (United States) Mitch Wilson from (United States) Anthem RC
- (Canada) Andrew Quattrin from (France) Valence Romans

=== Players Out ===
- (Canada) Andrew Quattrin to (France) Valence Romans
- (New Zealand) Sam Caird to (Japan) Yokohama Canon Eagles
- (Wales) Oscar Lennon to (England) Bristol Bears
- (Namibia) Le Roux Malan to (South Africa) Sharks
- (Samoa) Faletoi Peni to (New Zealand) Moana Pasifika
- (Canada) Brock Webster to (United States) Chicago Hounds
- (Fiji) Cameron Nordli-Kelemeti to (England) Doncaster Knights
- (United States) Kaipono Kayoshi to (Japan) Green Rockets Tokatsu
- (England) Jack Reeves to (England) Coventry
- (Ireland) John Poland to (Ireland) Young Munster
- (Canada) Cole Keith to (England) Doncaster Knights

== New Orleans Gold ==
=== Players Out ===
- (New Zealand) Jay Tuivaiti to (France) Mont-de-Marsan
- (Ireland) Pat O'Toole (retired)
- (France) Xavier Mignot to (France) Valence Romans
- (United States) Malcolm May to (United States) Chicago Hounds
- (United States) Ruben de Haas to (United States) Chicago Hounds
- (Australia) Aidan King to (United States) Old Glory DC
- (Belgium) Bart Vermeulen to (United States) Old Glory DC
- (United States) Luke Carty to (United States) Anthem RC
- (United States) Moni Tongaʻuiha to (United States) Anthem RC
- (United States) Julian Roberts to (United States) Anthem RC
- (United States) Harley Wheeler to (United States) Old Glory DC
- (United States) Paul Mullen to (United States) Old Glory DC
- (South Africa) Reece Botha to (United States) Chicago Hounds
- (United States) Joe Taufete'e to (United States) California Legion
- (Canada) Callum Botchar to (United States) Seattle Seawolves
- (Tonga) Tupou Afungia to (New Zealand) Moana Pasifika
- (Wales) Dorian Jones to (United States) Seattle Seawolves

== Old Glory DC ==
=== Players In ===
- (United States) Max Schumacher from (United States) Houston SaberCats
- (Argentina) Benjamín Bonasso from (United States) Miami Sharks
- (United States) Rick Rose from (United States) Miami Sharks
- (Australia) Aidan King from (United States) New Orleans Gold
- (Belgium) Bart Vermeulen from (United States) New Orleans Gold
- (United States) Harley Wheeler from (United States) New Orleans Gold
- (United States) Paul Mullen from (United States) New Orleans Gold
- (United States) Paddy Beattie from (United States) RFC Los Angeles
- (Fiji) Semi Kunatani from (United States) RFC Los Angeles

=== Players Out ===
- (Argentina) Axel Muller to (France) Narbonne
- (United States) Jack Iscaro to (France) Stade Français Paris
- (Wales) Steffan Hughes (retired)
- (Australia) Jamason Faʻanana-Schultz to (France) Narbonne
- (United States) Ethan McVeigh to (United States) New England Free Jacks

== San Diego Legion ==
=== Players Out ===
- (England) Ethan Grayson to (England) Newcastle Red Bulls
- (Australia) Nick Jooste to (Japan) Red Hurricanes Osaka
- (Australia) Rhian Stowers to (Japan) Tokyo Gas
- (England) Zak Farrance to (France) Nevers
- (England) James Rivers to Hong Kong Scottish
- (United States) Tavite Lopeti to (United States) Chicago Hounds
- (United States) Shilo Klein to (Italy) Zebre Parma
- (United States) Oliver Kane to (United States) Anthem RC
- (United States) Payton Telea-Ilalio to (United States) Anthem RC
- (Fiji) Cyrille Cama to (United States) New England Free Jacks
- (United States) Nathan Sylvia to (United States) New England Free Jacks
- (United States) Paddy Ryan to (United States) Seattle Seawolves
- (United States) Vili Helu to (Japan) Kurita Water Gush Akishima
- (South Africa) Tiaan Botha to (United States) Chicago Hounds
- (United States) Brandon Harvey to (United States) Chicago Hounds
- (United States) Liki Chan-Tang to (United States) Seattle Seawolves
- (United States) Christian Poidevin to (United States) California Legion
- (United States) Ryan James to (United States) California Legion
- (United States) Cassh Maluia to (United States) California Legion
- (United States) Steffan Crimp to (United States) California Legion

== Seattle Seawolves ==
=== Players In ===
- (Scotland) Mark Bennett from (Scotland) Edinburgh
- (South Africa) Marno Redelinghuys from (United States) Houston SaberCats
- (United States) Paddy Ryan from (United States) San Diego Legion
- (United States) Ezekiel Lindenmuth from (United States) Houston SaberCats
- (United States) Sean McNulty from (United States) Miami Sharks
- (United States) Rufus McLean from (United States) Houston SaberCats
- (Tonga) Harison Mataele from (France) Mont-de-Marsan
- (South Africa) André Warner from (United States) Houston SaberCats
- (United States) Liki Chan-Tang from (United States) San Diego Legion
- (United States) Kalisi Moli from (United States) Utah Warriors
- (Canada) Callum Botchar from (United States) New Orleans Gold
- (Uruguay) Ignacio Péculo from (United States) Chicago Hounds
- (Wales) Dorian Jones from (United States) New Orleans Gold
- (United States) LaRome White from (United States) Houston SaberCats
- (Italy) Matthias Douglas from (Italy) Vicenza
- (Ireland) Michael Hand from (United States) Chicago Hounds
- (United States) Nolan Tuamoheloa from (United States) Utah Warriors
- (United States) Drake Davis from (United States) Houston SaberCats

=== Players Out ===
- (United States) Malacchi Esdale to (United States) Anthem RC
- (South Africa) Kerron van Vuuren to (France) Carcassonne
- (United States) Chance Wenglewski (retired)
- (South Africa) Jade Stighling to (South Africa) Boland Cavaliers

== Utah Warriors ==
=== Players Out ===
- (New Zealand) Blake Makiri to (New Zealand) Counties Manukau
- (South Africa) Dylan Nel to (Japan) Green Rockets Tokatsu
- (United States) Tonga Kofe to (England) Leicester Tigers
- (New Zealand) Remsy Lemisio to (New Zealand) Hawkes Bay
- (New Zealand) Frank Lochore to (Japan) Green Rockets Tokatsu
- (United States) Papa Matelau to (Japan) Kurita Water Gush Akishima
- (New Zealand) Kyle Brown to (New Zealand) Chiefs
- (United States) Paul Lasike (retired)
- (New Zealand) Zion Going to (United States) Anthem RC
- (New Zealand) Jordan Trainor to (United States) Anthem RC
- Joel Hodgson to (United States) New England Free Jacks
- (United States) Bailey Wilson to (United States) New England Free Jacks
- (United States) Kalisi Moli to (United States) Seattle Seawolves
- (United States) Lance Williams to (United States) California Legion
- (Samoa) Fred Apulu to (United States) California Legion
- (United States) Nolan Tuamoheloa to (United States) Seattle Seawolves

== See also ==
- List of 2025–26 Premiership Rugby transfers
- List of 2025–26 Champ Rugby transfers
- List of 2025–26 Super Rugby transfers
- List of 2025–26 United Rugby Championship transfers
- List of 2025–26 Top 14 transfers
- List of 2025–26 Rugby Pro D2 transfers
