= Tongaʻuiha =

Tongaʻuiha is a Tongan surname. Notable people with the surname include:

- Hudson Tongaʻuiha (born 1983), Tongan rugby union footballer
- Moni Tongaʻuiha (born 1994), American rugby union player
- Soane Tongaʻuiha (born 1982), Tongan rugby union footballer
