= Spencer Jones (rugby union) =

Canadian rugby union player (born 1997)

- Born: 17 July 1997 (age 29) Vancouver, British Columbia, Canada
- Height: 1.85 m (6 ft 1 in)
- Weight: 100 kg (16 st; 220 lb)

Rugby union career
- Position: Centre
Senior career
Years	Team	Apps	(Points)
2019–2022	Toronto Arrows	25	(23)
2023	New England Free Jacks	15	(5)
2024-	Utah Warriors	1	(5)
- Correct as of 27 March 2024
International career
Years	Team	Apps	(Points)
2021–	Canada	1	(0)
- Correct as of 6 September 2021

Spencer Jones (born 17 July 1997) is a Canadian rugby union player, currently playing for the Utah Warriors in Major League Rugby (MLR) and the Canadian national team. His preferred position is centre.

He previously played for the Toronto Arrows and New England Free Jacks in the MLR.

== Professional career ==
Jones signed for Major League Rugby side Toronto Arrows for the 2021 Major League Rugby season, having previously represented the side in both 2019 and 2020. Jones made his debut for Canada in the 2023 Rugby World Cup Qualifiers.

Prior to the 2023 MLR season, Jones signed with the New England Free Jacks. Following the 2023 season, he signed with the Utah Warriors.
