= Jason Higgins =

Canada international rugby union player

- Born: 28 March 1995 (age 31) Cork, Ireland
- Height: 1.85 m (6 ft 1 in)
- Weight: 89 kg (14.0 st; 196 lb)

Rugby union career
- Position: Scrum-half
Senior career
Years	Team	Apps	(Points)
2020	Rugby United New York	0	(0)
2021	Toronto Arrows	13	(20)
2022–2023	San Diego Legion	20	(40)
2024–	Chicago Hounds	0	(0)
- Correct as of 19 December 2023
International career
Years	Team	Apps	(Points)
2021–	Canada	9	(0)
- Correct as of 6 September 2021

Jason Higgins (born 28 March 1995) is an Irish-born Canadian rugby union player, currently playing for the Chicago Hounds of Major League Rugby (MLR) and the Canadian national team. His preferred position is scrum-half.

== Professional career ==
Higgins signed for Major League Rugby side Toronto Arrows for the 2021 Major League Rugby season. Higgins made his debut for Canada in the 2023 Rugby World Cup Qualifiers.

In January 2022, it was announced that Higgins had signed for the San Diego Legion. The Chicago Hounds obtained Higgins for the 2024 Major League Rugby season through a trade with the San Diego Legion which sent Hugh Roach to the Legion.
