= Ryan Rees =

American rugby union player

- Born: 28 August 1997 (age 29) Austin, Texas, United States
- Height: 178 cm (5 ft 10 in)
- Weight: 78 kg (172 lb; 12 st 4 lb)

Rugby union career
- Position: Scrum-half
- Current team: Rugby ATL
Senior career
Years	Team	Apps	(Points)
2021–	Rugby ATL	30	(10)
- Correct as of 20 March 2023
International career
Years	Team	Apps	(Points)
2022–	USA Falcons XV		
2022–	United States	2	(0)
- Correct as of 20 March 2023

Ryan Rees (born 28 August 1998) is an American rugby union player, currently playing for the Rugby ATL in Major League Rugby (MLR). His preferred position is scrum-half.

== Early career ==
Rees is from Austin, Texas and attended Life University where he won two championships in 2018 and 2019.

== Professional career ==
Rees signed for Rugby ATL ahead of the 2021 Major League Rugby season having been traded to the side after his selection in the Supplemental Collegiate Draft. He has remained with the side since.

Rees toured with the USA Falcons XV side to South Africa in 2022. He made his debut for the full United States side in 2022, making his debut against Kenya.
