= Cory Daniel =

American rugby union player (born 1995)

- Full name: Cory Gilliland-Daniel
- Born: 11 September 1995 (age 31) Silver Spring, Maryland, United States
- Height: 190 cm (6 ft 3 in)
- Weight: 105 kg (231 lb; 16 st 7 lb)

Rugby union career
- Position: Flanker / Number 8
- Current team: Old Glory DC
Senior career
Years	Team	Apps	(Points)
2021–	Old Glory DC	39	(55)
- Correct as of 8 October 2024
International career
Years	Team	Apps	(Points)
2022–	USA Falcons XV		
2022–	United States	11	(5)
- Correct as of 6 July 2025

Cory Daniel (born 11 September 1995) is an American rugby union player, currently playing for the Old Glory DC. His preferred position is flanker or number 8.

Daniel is from Silver Spring, Maryland, and attended the University of North Carolina. Originally a wrestler, he switched sports to rugby in 2020. He is the older brother of teammate Brady Daniel.

== Professional career ==
Daniel signed for Old Glory DC as a crossover athlete in 2020. He debuted with the side the following season and has remained with the side since.

Daniel was selected for the USA Falcons XV in October 2022 for their tour to South Africa. He made his debut for the full United States side in November 2022 against Kenya where he started in the qualifier for the 2023 Rugby World Cup.
