= Lewis Evans (rugby union) =

- Born: Lewis Anthony-Mon Evans; 9 July 1987 (age 39) Newport, Wales
- Height: 1.93 m (6 ft 4 in)
- Weight: 110 kg (17 st 5 lb)
- School: St. Joseph's RC High School, Newport
- University: UWIC

Rugby union career
- Position(s): Number 8 Blindside Flanker
Senior career
| Years | Team | Apps | (Points) |
| 2006–2021 | Dragons | 236 | (65) |

Lewis Evans (born 9 July 1987, Newport, Wales) is a former Welsh rugby union player. A back row forward, he previously played his club rugby for the Dragons for the duration of his fifteen-year career.

== Club career ==
=== Dragons ===
After being invited into the Newport Gwent Dragons academy in 2005, he then went on to play his rugby for Ebbw Vale RFC and Newport RFC.

In the 2012–13 season, Newport Gwent Dragons named Evans as their captain, replacing the departing Luke Charteris and then later again for the 2015–16 season. He eventually captained the region on more than 50 occasions. Evans retired at the end of the 2020–21 Pro14 season.

== International career ==
=== Wales grade age ===
He has represented Wales at every age group level winning the Grand Slam with the U19's in 2006, and played for the U21 team in 2007. Evans featured in the Wales national rugby sevens team in 2007.

=== Wales ===
Evans was called up to the senior Wales team for the tour of North America in 2009, but did not feature, as he participated in Heineken Cup qualification with the Dragons, although he remained on standby. Evans was then named in the senior Wales squad for the match versus Australia on 3 December 2011 and then later again for the 'Possibles vs Probables' fixture ahead of the 2014 Wales rugby union tour of South Africa.

== Coaching career ==
=== Kroll USRC Tigers and Hong Kong ===
After many years coaching age grade rugby for the Dragons region and Newport RFC in the 2016–17 season, he is now retired as a player and the recently appointed Director of Rugby for Kroll USRC Tigers in Hong Kong for the 2021–22 season. At the end of the season Lewis lead the Hong Kong Men's National Team to winning the Asia Rugby Championship which led to a World Cup qualifier against Tonga in Sunshine Coast, and then a Repechage in Dubai. With Evans, Hong Kong qualified for the 2027 Men's Rugby World Cup, a first for the team.
