= Mike Sosene-Feagai =

US international rugby union player (born 1993)

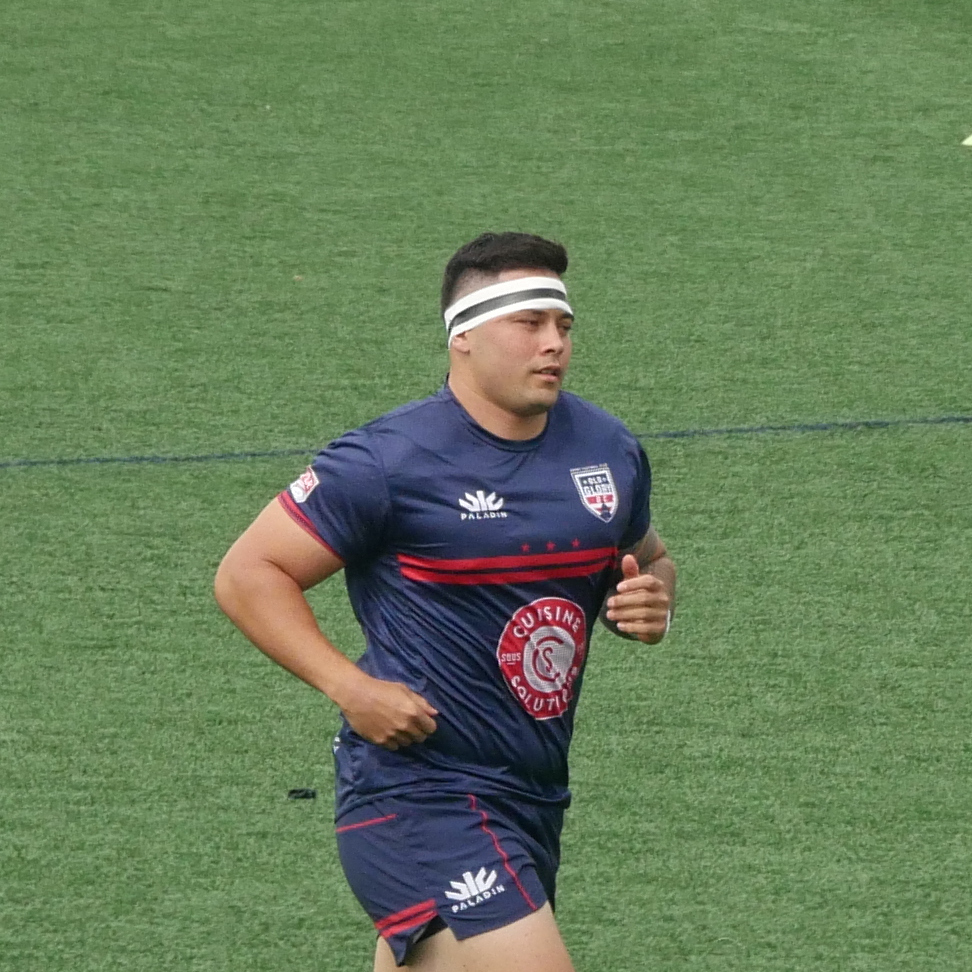
- Mike Sosene-Feagai warming up for Old Glory DC
- Born: Mike Sosene-Feagai; 17 April 1993 (age 33) Apia, Samoa
- Height: 1.803 m (5 ft 11 in)
- Weight: 103 kg (16 st 3 lb)
- School: Sacred Hearts College, Auckland
- University: University of Waikato

Rugby union career
- Position: Hooker
Senior career
Years	Team	Apps	(Points)
2016	San Diego Breakers	11	(0)
2020–	Old Glory DC	15	(10)
2021–2022	Toulon	21	(5)
2022–	SU Agen	33	(50)
- Correct as of 4 May 2024
Provincial / State sides
Years	Team	Apps	(Points)
2015	Hawkes Bay	1	(0)
2018–2019	Auckland	23	(15)
- Correct as of 28 December 2020
International career
Years	Team	Apps	(Points)
2013	Samoa U20	4	(0)
2016–	United States	9	(0)
- Correct as of 4 May 2024

Mike Sosene-Feagai (born 17 April 1993) is a rugby union player who currently plays hooker for SU Agen. He was born in Samoa and raised in New Zealand, and now lives in the United States and plays internationally for the United States national rugby union team.

He previously played for Auckland rugby union team in the Mitre 10. In August 2021, he signed a temporary contract with Toulon to cover an injury to Christopher Tolofua.
