= Tyler Rowland =

Canadian rugby union player (born 1999)

- Born: 16 October 1999 (age 27) Canada
- Height: 1.87 m (6 ft 1 1/2 in)
- Weight: 125 kg (19.7 st; 276 lb)

Rugby union career
- Position: Prop
Senior career
Years	Team	Apps	(Points)
2020–	Toronto Arrows	15	(5)
- Correct as of 3 July 2021
International career
Years	Team	Apps	(Points)
2018–2019	Canada U20s	6	(5)
2021–	Canada	1	(0)
- Correct as of 3 July 2021

Tyler Rowland (born 16 October 1999) is a Canadian rugby union player, currently playing for the Toronto Arrows of Major League Rugby (MLR) and the Canadian national team. His preferred position is prop.

== Professional career ==
Rowland signed for Major League Rugby side Toronto Arrows for the 2021 Major League Rugby season, having also played for the side in 2020. Rowland made his debut for Canada in the 2021 July rugby union tests.
