= Andrew Guerra =

United States rugby union player

- Born: 25 February 1998 (age 28) Chicago, Illinois, United States
- Height: 1.78 m (5 ft 10 in)
- Weight: 100 kg (16 st; 220 lb)
- School: Mount Carmel High School
- University: Notre Dame College

Rugby union career
- Position: Flanker
Senior career
Years	Team	Apps	(Points)
2021–	New Orleans Gold	11	(5)
- Correct as of 10 July 2021
International career
Years	Team	Apps	(Points)
2021–	United States	4	(0)
- Correct as of 3 October 2021

Andrew Guerra (born 25 February 1998) is an American rugby union player, currently playing for the New Orleans Gold of Major League Rugby (MLR) and the United States national team. His preferred position is flanker.

== Professional career ==
Guerra signed for Major League Rugby side New Orleans Gold for the 2021 Major League Rugby season. Guerra made his debut for United States against Ireland during the 2021 July rugby union tests.
