= Corey Thomas (rugby union) =

Canada international rugby union player (born 1994)

- Full name: Corey Thomas
- Born: 21 September 1994 (age 32) Australia
- Height: 1.95 m (6 ft 5 in)
- Weight: 117 kg (18 st 6 lb; 258 lb)

Rugby union career
- Position: Lock
- Current team: Sunwolves
Senior career
Years	Team	Apps	(Points)
2014	Perth Spirit	6	(0)
2015	Brisbane City	8	(0)
2016–2017	Canon Eagles	6	(0)
2018–	Kamaishi Seawaves	13	(30)
2020	Sunwolves	0	(0)
- Correct as of 16 December 2019
International career
Years	Team	Apps	(Points)
2021	Canada	6	(20)

Corey Thomas (コーリー・トーマス, Kōrī tōmasu; born 21 September 1994) is an Australian born Canadian rugby union player who plays as a Lock. He currently plays for the LA Giltinis of Major League Rugby (MLR).

Thomas previously played for the Sunwolves in Super Rugby.
