= David Ainuʻu =

United States rugby union player (born 1999)

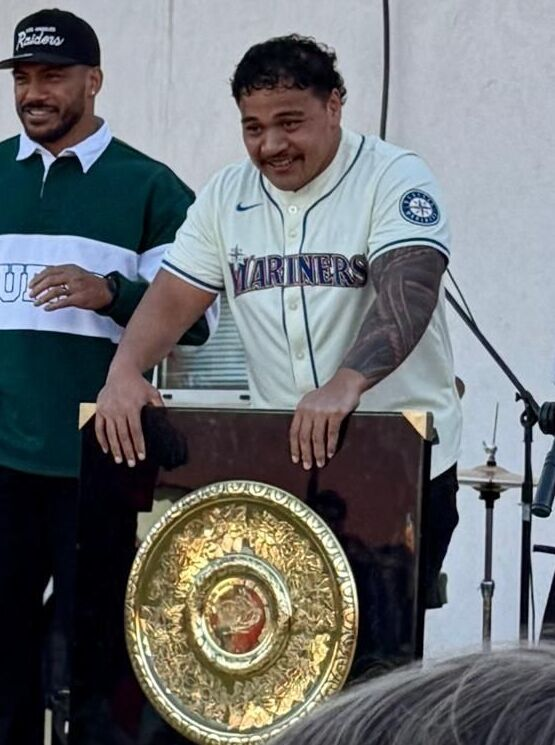
- Full name: David Faimafiliotamaʻitaʻi Ainuʻu
- Born: November 20, 1999 (age 26) American Samoa
- Height: 5 ft 10 in (1.78 m)
- Weight: 275 lb (125 kg)
- School: Capital High School

Rugby union career
- Position: Prop
Amateur team(s)
Years	Team	Apps	(Points)
- Prairie RFC
- Liberty
- Washington Loggers
–2017	Seattle Saracens		
- Correct as of March 6, 2019
Senior career
Years	Team	Apps	(Points)
2017–	Toulouse	60	(0)
- Correct as of April 10, 2023
International career
Years	Team	Apps	(Points)
- United States U19
- United States U20
2018–	United States	19	(5)
- Correct as of May 3, 2023

David Faimafiliotamaʻitaʻi Ainuʻu (born November 20, 1999) is a rugby union player who plays as a prop for Toulouse in France's Top14 and for the United States men's national team. Ainuʻu has also represented the United States with multiple age-grade sides—including the United States national under-20 rugby union team.

== Early life ==
David Ainuʻu was born in American Samoa on 20 November 1999. Ainuʻu was first introduced to rugby when he was the water boy for his brother's team. He first played rugby himself with Prairie RFC in Yelm, Washington. Ainuʻu was also selected to play for the Washington Loggers, Rugby Washington's state-level representative side. Ainuʻu attended Capital High School in Olympia, Washington.

== Club career ==
Prior to December 2017, Ainuʻu played rugby for Seattle Saracens in the CDI Premier League. In December 2017, Ainuʻu signed a six-month academy contract with Toulouse in France's Top14. (Ainuʻu had previously agreed to join the Seattle Seawolves for Major League Rugby's inaugural 2018 season, but ended that agreement before the season began in order to play at the higher level of competition.) In September 2018, Ainuʻu re-signed with Toulouse, committing to the club through the 2020–21 season. Ainuʻu made his Top 14 debut for Toulouse on 23 September 2018, appearing as a halftime-substitute in a 66–15 defeat to Montpellier.

== International career ==
=== USA Junior All-Americans ===
Ainuʻu was named to the United States national under-20 rugby union team (Junior All-Americans) ahead of a pair of 2018 World Rugby Under 20 Trophy qualification matches against Canada.

=== USA Eagles ===
Ainuʻu was first named to the roster of the United States senior national team ahead of the 2018 June rugby union tests, but did not make an appearance for the team at that time, instead playing for the Junior All-Americans. Ainuʻu made his debut for the Eagles on 10 November 2018, appearing as a substitute, in the Eagles' 30–29 victory over Samoa during the 2018 end-of-year tests. Ainuʻu made his first appearance in the Eagles' starting lineup on 2 March 2019 in a 32–25 defeat to Uruguay during the 2019 Americas Rugby Championship.

== Honours ==
Toulouse

- European Rugby Champions Cup: 2024
