= Jason Damm =

American rugby union player (born 1995)

- Born: 26 January 1995 (age 31) Marietta, Georgia, United States
- Height: 193 cm (6 ft 4 in)
- Weight: 107 kg (236 lb; 16 st 12 lb)

Rugby union career
- Position: Flanker / Number 8
- Current team: Rugby ATL
Senior career
Years	Team	Apps	(Points)
2019	Glendale Raptors	3	(0)
2020–	Rugby ATL	29	(35)
- Correct as of 20 March 2023
International career
Years	Team	Apps	(Points)
2022–	United States	2	(0)
2022–	USA Falcons XV		
- Correct as of 20 March 2023

Jason Damm (born 26 January 1995) is an American rugby union player, currently playing for Rugby ATL. His preferred position is flanker or number 8.

== Early career ==
Damm is from Fort Mill, South Carolina and attended Clemson University.

== Professional career ==
Damm signed for the Glendale Raptors for the 2019 Major League Rugby season. He moved to Rugby ATL ahead of the 2020 Major League Rugby season, and has remained with the side since.

Damm debuted for the United States in July 2022 against Chile. He went on to represent the USA Falcons XV on their tour of South America in October 2022.

== Honours ==
RFC Los Angeles

- All Major League Ruby Second team (2025)
