= Greg Peterson (rugby union) =

US international rugby union player

- Born: Gregory H. Peterson; 26 March 1991 (age 35) Sydney, Australia
- Height: 2.04 m (6 ft 8 in)
- Weight: 124 kg (273 lb; 19 st 7 lb)
- School: The Scots College

Rugby union career
- Position: Lock
Amateur team(s)
Years	Team	Apps	(Points)
2012–2014	Manly	18	(25)
2016–2017	Glasgow Hawks	33	(0)
Senior career
Years	Team	Apps	(Points)
2014	North Harbour Rays	8	(15)
2014–2015	Leicester Tigers	3	(0)
2015–2018	Glasgow Warriors	32	(15)
2018–2019	Bordeaux Bègles	8	(0)
2019–2023	Newcastle Falcons	72	(10)
2023	Glasgow Warriors	15	(0)
2024	San Diego Legion	13	(0)
- Correct as of 16 December 2024
Super Rugby
Years	Team	Apps	(Points)
2011–2014	Waratahs	1	(0)
- Correct as of 20 May 2021
International career
Years	Team	Apps	(Points)
2009–2011	Australia U20	8	(0)
2014–2024	United States	51	(5)
- Correct as of 16 November 2024

Greg Peterson (born 26 March 1991) is a retired Australian-born American rugby union player who played lock. During his club career Peterson played professionally in Australia, Europe, and the United States. Peterson played for the United States national rugby union team from 2014 to 2024, including at the 2025 and 2019 Rugby World Cups.

== Club career ==
Peterson started with Manly in Australia. Peterson was named in the Waratahs squad ahead of the 2012 Super Rugby season. In 2014, Peterson was appointed as captain of the North Harbour Rays for the teams' opening game in the inaugural season of Australia's National Rugby Championship.

Following his season with the Rays, Peterson earned a trial with Leicester Tigers and eventually signed a contract that would keep him there until the end of the 2014–15 season, but he made only a few appearances for Leicester.

Peterson signed a two-year contract with Glasgow Warriors in the Pro12 starting in the 2015–16 season. He is Glasgow Warrior No. 255. While in Scotland he played for Glasgow Hawks when not in use by the Glasgow Warriors. Peterson was drafted to Marr in the Scottish Premiership for the 2017–18 season.

Peterson was drafted to Currie in the Scottish Premiership for the 2018–19 season.

Peterson joined the Union Bordeaux Bègles in France on 28 December 2018, as a replacement for the injured Jandré Marais.

On 19 March 2019, Peterson returned to England to join with Newcastle Falcons in the Premiership Rugby on a two-year deal from the 2019-20 season. Peterson left Newcastle after the 2022-23 season.

He started the 2023-24 season with a short-term contract with the Glasgow Warriors in the United Rugby Championship. He played the first 9 rounds of the URC and also played against Bayonne in a European Champions Cup match.

In 2024 he signed for the San Diego Legion in the MLR. In December 2024 Peterson announced his retirement from professional rugby.

== International career ==
Peterson represented Australia under 20 in the 2011 IRB Junior World Championship.

Though born in Australia, Peterson qualified to play for the United States national team by virtue of his American grandfather. Peterson was named in the Eagles 35-man roster for their 2014 end-of-year tests against New Zealand, Romania, Tonga and Fiji. He made his debut against Romania on 8 November 2014, coming off the bench at the 62nd minute. Peterson played for the U.S. at the 2015 Rugby World Cup.

=== International tries ===
As of 20 November 2021

Try	Opposing team	Location	Venue	Competition	Date	Result	Score
1	Canada	Ottawa, Canada	Twin Elm Rugby Park	2015 Rugby World Cup warm-up matches	22 August 2015	Win	23 – 41

== Family ==
Peterson's grandfather played rugby for the U.S. national team, and his father played American football at Northwestern University in Chicago.
