= Benjamín Bonasso =

United States rugby union player

- Born: 1 June 1997 (age 29) Bridgeport, Connecticut, United States
- Height: 1.93 m (6 ft 4 in)
- Weight: 103 kg (16.2 st; 227 lb)

Rugby union career
- Position: Flanker
Amateur team(s)
Years	Team	Apps	(Points)
2018–2019	Newman	35	(35)
Senior career
Years	Team	Apps	(Points)
2021–2023	Rugby New York	40	(25)
2023–2025	Miami Sharks	15	(15)
2026-	Old Glory DC	0	(0)
- Correct as of 9 December 2025
International career
Years	Team	Apps	(Points)
- Argentina U20
2021–	United States	9	(5)
- Correct as of 6 July 2025

Benjamín Bonasso (born 1 June 1997) is an Argentine-American rugby union player who played for the Old Glory DC in Major League Rugby (MLR) and plays for the United States national team. His preferred position is flanker.

== Professional career ==
Bonasso was born in Connecticut before moving to Buenos Aires as a child, playing age grade rugby in Argentina. He signed for Major League Rugby side Rugby United New York for the 2021 Major League Rugby season.

Newly founded Major League Rugby club Miami Sharks signed Bonasso for the Sharks’ inaugural 2024 season. In his first season with the Sharks, Bonasso scored three tries in fifteen appearances.

== International career ==
Bonasso debuted for United States against Uruguay during the 2023 Rugby World Cup – Americas qualification.
