= Siaosi Mahoni =

US international rugby union player

- Born: January 29, 1997 (age 29) East Palo Alto, California, United States
- Height: 6 ft 8 in (2.03 m)
- Weight: 295 lb (134 kg; 21 st 1 lb)

Rugby union career
- Position: Lock
Amateur team(s)
Years	Team	Apps	(Points)
- East Palo Alto
Senior career
Years	Team	Apps	(Points)
2016	San Francisco Rush	5	(0)
2017–2018	RC Narbonne	7	(0)
2018–2021	San Diego Legion	25	(5)
2022-2024	Houston Sabercats	25	(15)
2025	Seattle Seawolves	0	(0)
- Correct as of 25 February 2022
International career
Years	Team	Apps	(Points)
2016	USA Selects	2	(0)
2017	United States	9	(0)
- Correct as of 13 May 2024

Siaosi "CC" Mahoni (born 29 January 1997) is an American international rugby union player for the Seattle Seawolves in Major League Rugby (MLR). His preferred position is lock. He is of Tongan descent.

Mahoni was part of the first professional rugby competition in the United States, playing for PRO Rugby team San Francisco Rush.

He has played pro rugby in France for RC Narbonne and also in California for the San Diego Legion prior to his arrival in Texas for the Houston Sabercats.
