= Old Glory DC =

Professional rugby union team from Washington DC

- Full name: Old Glory DC Rugby Football Club
- Nickname: The Flags
- Founded: 2018; 8 years ago
- Location: Fairfax, Virginia
- Ground: George Mason Stadium (Capacity: 5,000)
- Chairman: Paul Sheehy; Chris Dunlavey
- Coach: Agustín Cavalieri
- Captain: Rob Harley
- Most caps: Jack Iscaro (76)
- Top scorer: Jason Robertson (367)
- Most tries: William Talataina (23)
- League: Major League Rugby
- 2026: Semifinals; 4th in MLR
1st kit	2nd kit

Official website
- oldglorydc.com

Old Glory DC RFC is an American professional rugby union team based in the Washington metropolitan area that competes in Major League Rugby (MLR). Old Glory was founded in 2018, played some exhibition games in 2019, and began regular-season MLR play in 2020.

The organization is led by two local business leaders, former USA Eagles' Paul Sheehy, and local club rugby player Chris Dunlavey. As of September 2026, the team is coached by Agustín Cavalieri, who also coaches the USA Eagles U-23 team.

== History ==
Major League Rugby announced on May 15, 2018, that an expansion team would begin play in Washington, D.C., by the 2020 season and confirmed the team in November 2018. On February 6, 2019, the team name was announced as Old Glory DC. On March 28, 2019, the Scottish Rugby Union announced that it had purchased a minority interest in the team.

After losing seven matches in a row to start the 2022 season, Old Glory DC announced the immediate departure of head coach Andrew Douglas on March 29, 2022. At the time of his departure, Douglas was the longest-tenured head coach in MLR, having joined for the 2019 exhibition season before the first MLR season in 2020. He left with a 10-17-1 overall MLR record and a 37.5% winning percentage. Three days later, on April 1, Old Glory DC announced that former NOLA Gold head coach Nate Osborne would serve as an interim head coach for the remainder of the season while the team conducted a search for a permanent replacement.

On October 31, 2022, Josh Syms was announced as the new head coach. On May 15, 2023, it was announced that Syms would leave at the end of the season to coach forwards for the Italian team Zebre Parma. Several weeks later, Old Glory made the playoffs for the first time in franchise history. On July 7, 2023, the team announced the hiring of Simon Cross as head coach to replace Syms.

In June 2023, the team announced Earth, Wind & Fire bassist Verdine White and businessman Paxton Baker had become minority owners.

In the 2024 season, Old Glory began play at the Maryland SoccerPlex, a sports complex in Germantown, Maryland. That season, Old Glory made the playoffs for the second time in franchise history. In 2025, Old Glory again made the playoffs, but was defeated in the first round by the Chicago Hounds.

Following the conclusion of the 2025 season, Old Glory announced that it would move to George Mason Stadium in Fairfax, Virginia starting in the 2026 season. Additionally, the Scottish Rugby Union disposed of its ownership in the team. In September 2026, Simon Cross stepped down as head coach of the team, taking on a new position as Director of Rugby Development and Player Pathways. Agustín "Cuca" Cavalieri was announced as the new coach of Old Glory DC.

== Stadium ==
The team has played its home games since the 2026 season at George Mason Stadium in Fairfax, Virginia.

Initially, the team played their exhibition and inaugural campaigns at Cardinal Stadium on the campus of Catholic University of America. In 2021 they moved to Segra Field in Leesburg, Virginia. The team played three seasons at Segra Field and on September 6, 2023, it was announced that the team would move to the Maryland SoccerPlex in Germantown, Maryland the following season.

=== Map ===
Old Glory DC Stadiums
Previous stadiums
Current stadium

== Sponsorship ==
Season	Kit manufacturer	Shirt sponsor	Other Shirt sponsor(s)
2019	Adidas	Cuisine Solutions	None
2020–2022	Paladin Sports	Cuisine Solutions	Leidos; Iron Vine Security
2023	Paladin Sports	Cuisine Solutions	Leidos; ECS Tech
2024	Kappa	Cuisine Solutions	Events DC; ECS Tech; Gringo Gordo Empanadas

== Roster ==
The Old Glory DC squad for the 2026 Major League Rugby season is:

2026 Old Glory DC squad
**Props**: (United States) Patrick Beattie; (United States) Connor Devos; (Australia) Liam Fletcher; (Canada) **Cali Martinez**; (United States) **Paul Mullen**; (Netherlands) Bart Vermeulen *; **Hookers**: (Wales) **Kirby Myhill**; (United States) KoiKoi Nelligan; (United States) Connor Robinson; **Locks**: (Scotland) **Rob Harley** **(c)**; (United States) **Tevita Naqali**; (United States) Rick Rose; (United States) Bill Whiteside	**Back row**: (United States) **Benjamín Bonasso**; (United States) **Cory Daniel**; (United States) Colin Grosse; (United States) Aidan King; (Fiji) **Semi Kunatani**; **Scrum-halves**: (United States) John LeFevre; (New Zealand) Jay Renton; (South Africa) Aidan Ridgway *; **Fly-halves**: (Zimbabwe) **Jason Robertson**; (United States) Max Schumacher	**Centres**: (United States) Ross Depperschmidt; (New Zealand) Jason Emery; (Australia) Jordan Jackson-Hope; (United States) John Powers; **Wings**: (England) Perry Humphreys; (United States) John Rizzo; (United States) Harley Wheeler; **Fullbacks**: (Scotland) **Damien Hoyland**; (United States) Owen Sheehy
**(c)** denotes the team captain. **Bold** denotes internationally capped players. * denotes players qualified to play for United States on residency or dual nationality. Source:

=== Head coaches ===
- (New Zealand) Andrew Douglas (2019–March 2022)
- (Australia) Nate Osborne (April 2022–October 2022) interim
- (New Zealand) Josh Syms (October 2022–May 2023)
- (Scotland) Simon Cross (July 2023–2026)
- (Argentina) Agustín Cavalieri (September 2026-present)

=== Captains ===
- (United States) Josh Brown (2019) (Captain)
- (Scotland) Mungo Mason (2020–2021) (Co-captain)
- (United States) Thretton Palamo (2020–2021) (Co-captain)
- (Samoa) Danny Tusitala (2022) (Captain)
- (United States) Jamason Faʻanana-Schultz (2023–24) (Captain)
- (England) Stan South (2023) (Vice Captain)
- (Scotland) Rob Harley (2025-present) (Captain)
- (United States) Jamason Faʻanana-Schultz (2025-present) (Vice Captain)
- (Wales) Steffan Hughes (2025-present) (Vice Captain)

== Records ==
=== Season standings ===
Season	Conference	Regular season										Postseason						
Season	Conference	Pos	Pld	W	D	L	F	A	+/−	BP	Pts	Pld	W	L	F	A	+/−	Result
2020 (Note: 2020 regular season shortened and playoffs cancelled due to the COVID-19 pandemic.)	Eastern	2nd	5	4	0	1	122	129	-7	1	17	-	-	-	-	-	-	Cancelled
2021	Eastern	5th	16	6	1	9	409	490	-81	13	39	-	-	-	-	-	-	Did not qualify
2022	Eastern	6th	16	3	0	13	423	591	-168	11	23	-	-	-	-	-	-	Did not qualify
2023	Eastern	3rd	16	7	1	8	408	443	-35	13	43	2	1	1	44	58	-14	Lost Conference Final (NE)
2024	Eastern	4th	16	7	2	7	394	416	-22	10	42	1	0	1	29	33	-4	Lost Eliminator Game (NE)
2025	Eastern	3rd	16	8	0	8	438	478	-40	13	45	1	0	1	16	27	-9	Lost Eliminator Game (CHI)
2026	N/A	4th	10	4	0	6	242	300	-58	6	22	1	0	1	22	57	-35	Lost Semifinal (CHI)
Totals			93	39	4	52	2,436	2,847	-411	67	231	5	1	4	111	175	-64	4 postseason appearances

=== Player records ===
Bold indicates player is still with the team.

- Most appearances = Jack Iscaro (76)
- Most tries = William Talataina (23)
- Most points = **Jason Robertson (367)**
- Most tackles = **Cory Daniel (888)**

== 2019 season ==
All games in the 2019 season were exhibition games and did not count in the MLR standings.

Date	Opponent	Home/Away	Location	Result
May 19	Shannon RFC	Home	Cardinal Stadium	Lost, 22-26
May 27	Scotland U-20	Home	Cardinal Stadium	Lost, 7-70
June 1	USA Rugby South Panthers	Home	Cardinal Stadium	Won, 28-7
June 9	Ontario Blues	Home	Cardinal Stadium	Won, 29-15

== 2020 season ==
On March 12, 2020, MLR announced the season would go on hiatus immediately for 30 days due to fears surrounding the 2019–2020 coronavirus pandemic. It was cancelled the following week.

Regular season
Date	Opponent	Home/Away	Location	Result
February 8	New Orleans Gold	Away	Gold Mine	Lost, 13-46
February 16	Seattle Seawolves	Home	Cardinal Stadium	Won, 28-22
February 22	Houston SaberCats	Away	Aveva Stadium	Won, 22-13
February 29	Austin Gilgronis	Away	Toyota Stadium	Won, 28-19
March 8	Rugby ATL	Home	Cardinal Stadium	Won, 31-29
March 15	Colorado Raptors	Home	Cardinal Stadium	Cancelled
March 22	San Diego Legion	Away	Torero Stadium	Cancelled
March 29	Rugby United New York	Home	Cardinal Stadium	Cancelled
April 11	New Orleans Gold	Home	Cardinal Stadium	Cancelled
April 18	New England Free Jacks	Away	Union Point Sports Complex	Cancelled
April 26	Toronto Arrows	Home	Cardinal Stadium	Cancelled
May 3	Utah Warriors	Home	Cardinal Stadium	Cancelled
May 9	Rugby United New York	Away	MCU Park	Cancelled
May 17	Rugby ATL	Away	Life University Running Eagles Stadium	Cancelled
May 24	New England Free Jacks	Home	Cardinal Stadium	Cancelled
May 31	Toronto Arrows	Away	Lamport Stadium	Cancelled

== 2021 season ==
Date	Opponent	Home/Away	Location	Result
March 21	NOLA Gold	Away	Gold Mine	Draw, 26-26
March 27	Rugby ATL	Home	Segra Field	Won, 30-23
April 3	Toronto Arrows	Home	Segra Field	Lost, 19-40
April 18	RUNY	Away	MCU Park	Lost, 34-38
April 25	New England Free Jacks	Home	Segra Field	Won, 35-22
May 1	LA Giltinis	Away	Los Angeles Memorial Coliseum	Lost, 17-47
May 8	Utah Warriors	Away	Zions Bank Stadium	Lost, 33-34
May 16	Seattle Seawolves	Home	Segra Field	Won, 22-18
May 22	Houston SaberCats	Away	Aveva Stadium	Won, 21-13
May 30	RUNY	Home	Segra Field	Lost, 10-46
June 6	New England Free Jacks	Away	Union Point Sports Complex	Lost, 34-38
June 12	NOLA Gold	Home	Segra Field	Lost, 21-25
June 26	Rugby ATL	Away	Lupo Family Field	Lost, 12-32
July 4	Toronto Arrows	Away	Lupo Family Field (Note: The Arrows temporarily relocated for the 2021 season due to COVID-19 border crossing concerns.)	Lost, 28-34
July 10	San Diego Legion	Home	Segra Field	Won, 38-29
July 17	Austin Gilgronis	Home	Segra Field	Won, 29-25

== 2022 season ==
=== Exhibition ===
Old Glory played two preseason matches in January 2022. Both matches were held at the St. James Sports Complex, a series of indoor fields in Springfield, Virginia.

Date	Opponent	Home/Away	Location	Result
January 21	Toronto Arrows	Home	St. James Sports Complex	Lost, 47-17
January 28	New England Free Jacks	Home	St. James Sports Complex	Won, 27-22

=== Regular season ===
Old Glory played eighteen matches in the regular season with two bye weeks. Their home matches were played at Segra Field in Leesburg, Virginia. Because the MLR's Eastern Conference had one team fewer than the Western Conference, Old Glory played the Toronto Arrows three times in the regular season, once at home and twice in Toronto.

Date	Opponent	Home/Away	Location	Result
February 5	Rugby ATL	Away	Atlanta Silverbacks Park	Lost, 22-55
February 12	Austin Gilgronis	Away	Bold Stadium	Lost, 12-57
February 18	New England Free Jacks	Home	Segra Field	Lost, 25-41
February 26	Toronto Arrows	Home	Segra Field	Lost, 5-29
March 6	San Diego Legion	Away	SDSU Sports Deck	Lost, 12-24
March 20	Rugby ATL	Home	Segra Field	Lost, 13-27
March 26	New Orleans Gold	Home	Segra Field	Lost, 22-31
April 3	Rugby New York	Away	JFK Stadium	Lost, 31-35
April 9	Toronto Arrows	Away	York Lions Stadium	Lost, 27-32
April 15	Utah Warriors	Home	Segra Field	Won, 22-21
April 23	Dallas Jackals	Home	Segra Field	Won, 50-10
May 7	New England Free Jacks	Away	Veterans Memorial Stadium	Lost, 26-20
May 14	New Orleans Gold	Away	Gold Mine on Airline	Lost, 50-21
May 21	Houston Sabercats	Home	Segra Field	Lost, 42-59
May 29	Rugby New York	Home	Segra Field	Lost, 49-59
June 5	Toronto Arrows	Away	York Lions Stadium	Won, 50-35

== 2023 season ==
Old Glory played 16 games in the 2023 regular season. All eight home games were played at Segra Field. They advanced to the playoffs, defeating the Rugby New York Ironworkers to advance to the conference final, which they lost to the New England Free Jacks.

=== Regular season ===
Date	Opponent	Home/Away	Location	Result
February 18	Chicago Hounds	Home	Segra Field	Won, 42-27
March 5	Rugby New York Ironworkers	Away	Memorial Field	Lost, 34-8
March 11	New England Free Jacks	Away	Veterans Memorial Stadium	Lost, 34-31
March 18	Toronto Arrows	Home	Segra Field	Won, 29-3
March 25	NOLA Gold	Home	Segra Field	Lost, 17-20
April 2	San Diego Legion	Away	Snapdragon Stadium	Lost, 48-26
April 8	Rugby ATL	Away	Atlanta Silverbacks Park	Lost, 35-27
April 16	Rugby New York Ironworkers	Home	Segra Field	Won, 42-31
April 22	Utah Warriors	Home	Segra Field	Won, 36-22
May 6	Dallas Jackals	Away	Choctaw Stadium	Won, 7-3 (Note: Match abandoned at halftime due to hazardous weather conditions.)
May 14	New England Free Jacks	Home	Segra Field	Lost, 24-42
May 18	Toronto Arrows	Away	York Lions Stadium	Draw, 29-29
May 27	Seattle Seawolves	Home	Segra Field	Lost, 41-19
June 3	NOLA Gold	Away	Gold Mine	Won, 28-15
June 9	Houston SaberCats	Away	SaberCats Stadium	Lost, 31-7
June 17	Rugby ATL	Home	Segra Field	Won, 36-28

=== Postseason ===
Round	Date	Opponent	Home/Away	Location	Result
East Eliminator	June 25	Rugby New York Ironworkers	Away	Memorial Field	Won, 37-33
East Conference Finals	July 1	New England Free Jacks	Away	Veterans Memorial Stadium	Lost, 7-25

== 2024 season ==
Old Glory played 16 games in the 2024 regular season. All eight home games were played at the Maryland SoccerPlex. The team made it to the playoffs for the second time in its history, securing a place by taking a losing bonus point in their loss to the Miami Sharks on June 22. They made the playoffs for the second time in team history and were defeated by the New England Free Jacks in the Eastern Conference Semi-Final.

=== Regular season ===
Date	Opponent	Home/Away	Location	Result
March 2	NOLA Gold	Away	Gold Mine	Lost, 18-6
March 9	New England Free Jacks	Away	Veterans Memorial Stadium	Won, 35-34
March 16	Chicago Hounds	Home	Maryland SoccerPlex	Draw, 22-22
March 23	San Diego Legion	Home	Maryland SoccerPlex	Lost, 27-11
March 30	Anthem RC	Away	American Legion Memorial Stadium	Won, 46-32
April 6	RFC Los Angeles	Home	Maryland SoccerPlex	Draw, 22-22
April 20	Houston SaberCats	Home	Maryland SoccerPlex	Lost, 38-17
April 26	Utah Warriors	Away	Zions Bank Stadium	Lost, 31-24
May 4	Miami Sharks	Home	Maryland SoccerPlex	Won, 13-10
May 11	Chicago Hounds	Away	SeatGeek Stadium	Won, 22-21
May 24	Seattle Seawolves	Away	Starfire Sports Complex	Lost, 26-24
June 1	Anthem RC	Home	Maryland SoccerPlex	Won, 47-29
June 8	New England Free Jacks	Home	Maryland SoccerPlex	Lost, 31-30
June 14	Dallas Jackals	Away	Choctaw Stadium	Won, 36-34
June 22	Miami Sharks	Away	Chase Stadium	Lost, 17-12
June 29	NOLA Gold	Home	Maryland SoccerPlex	Won, 27-24

=== Postseason ===
Round	Date	Opponent	Home/Away	Location	Result
Eastern Semi-Final	July 20	New England Free Jacks	Away	Veterans Memorial Stadium	Lost, 33-29

== 2025 season ==
In 2025, Old Glory played 16 matches. One of eight home matches was played at George Mason Stadium. The team made the playoffs for the third consecutive year but lost in the semi-finals.

=== Regular season ===
Date	Opponent	Home/Away	Location	Result
February 15	Miami Sharks	Away	DRV PNK Stadium	Won, 31-29
March 1	San Diego Legion	Home	Maryland SoccerPlex	Lost, 26-10
March 8	Anthem RC	Home	Maryland SoccerPlex	Won, 26-22
March 15	Chicago Hounds	Away	SeatGeek Stadium	Lost, 30-26
March 22	New England Free Jacks	Home	Maryland SoccerPlex	Won, 28-14
March 29	RFCLA	Away	Wallis Annenberg Stadium	Lost, 54-44
April 5	Seattle Seawolves	Home	Maryland SoccerPlex	Won, 29-12
April 12	NOLA Gold	Away	Gold Mine on Airline	Lost, 51-29
April 19	Miami Sharks	Home	Maryland SoccerPlex	Lost, 37-35
April 26	Houston SaberCats	Away	SaberCats Stadium	Lost, 48-27
May 4	Utah Warriors	Home	Maryland SoccerPlex	Won, 28-12
May 13	NOLA Gold	Home	George Mason Stadium	Won, 27-14
May 18	Anthem RC	Away	American Legion Memorial Stadium	Won, 41-19
May 24	New England Free Jacks	Away	Veterans Memorial Stadium	Won, 20-17
May 31	RFCLA	Home	Maryland SoccerPlex	Lost, 43-32
June 7	San Diego Legion	Away	Torero Stadium	Lost, 50-5

=== Postseason ===
Round	Date	Opponent	Home/Away	Location	Result
Eastern Semi-Final	June 14	Chicago Hounds	Away	SeatGeek Stadium	Lost, 27-16
