= Nathan Sylvia =

American rugby union player

- Full name: Nathan Sylvia
- Born: 17 March 1994 (age 32) San Diego, California, U.S.
- Height: 184 cm (6 ft 0 in)
- Weight: 118 kg (260 lb; 18 st 8 lb)
- School: Mt. Carmel High School
- University: California Polytechnic State University

Rugby union career
- Position: Prop
- Current team: San Diego Legion
Youth career
- 2015-2018: Cal Poly Mustangs
- 2016: Randwick
Senior career
Years	Team	Apps	(Points)
2017-2018	San Francisco Golden Gate	??	(??)
2018-	San Diego Legion	66	(15)
- Correct as of 1 August 2023
International career
Years	Team	Apps	(Points)
2015-2016	USA under-23	??	(??)
2022	USA Falcons	1	(0)
2023	USA	4	(0)
- Correct as of 7 February 2024

Nathan Sylvia (born 17 March 1994) is an American rugby union player who plays at prop for the San Diego Legion of Major League Rugby (MLR).

== Career ==
=== Youth ===
Sylvia found rugby late in life. After playing American football growing up and attempting to play on at California Polytechnic State University, San Luis Obispo, as a defensive lineman, he decided to take up rugby. He was among several Division 1-A rugby players to train with the ACT Brumbies in Canberra, Australia, in 2016. While there, he played with Randwick Under-20s.

=== Senior ===
He spent a season at San Francisco Golden Gate RFC in the Pacific Rugby Premiership, before being selected for the San Diego squad for the inaugural MLR season. Sylvia became the 19th player in Major League Rugby to reach 50 appearances.

=== International ===
He was named in the USA Falcons squad for the tour to South Africa. He made his debut for the USA national side in the 2023 Rugby World Cup Repechage.

== Honors ==
=== Personal ===
- USA Rugby Collegiate All-American Honourable Mention (2016)
- San Diego Legion Forward of the Year (2022)

=== USA ===
- La Vila International Rugby Cup (2024)
