= Christian Dyer =

United States rugby union player

- Born: 26 December 1997 (age 28) Sacramento, California, United States
- Height: 1.87 m (6 ft 1 1/2 in)
- Weight: 95 kg (15.0 st; 209 lb)
- University: University of California, Berkeley

Rugby union career
- Position: Centre / Wing / Fullback
Amateur team(s)
Years	Team	Apps	(Points)
2016–2020	California Golden Bears rugby		
Senior career
Years	Team	Apps	(Points)
2022–2024	Houston SaberCats	45	(95)
2025	Rugby Football Club Los Angeles	6	(12)
- Correct as of 15 August 2025
International career
Years	Team	Apps	(Points)
2021–2024	United States	14	(45)
- Correct as of 13 May 2024
National sevens team
Years	Team		Comps
2021	United States Sevens		2
- Correct as of 13 June 2024

Christian Dyer (born 26 December 1997) is an American former professional rugby union player, who played for the Rugby Football Club Los Angeles and Houston SaberCats of Major League Rugby (MLR) and the United States national team. His preferred position is centre, wing or fullback.

== Professional career ==
Dyer signed for Major League Rugby side Houston SaberCats for the 2022 Major League Rugby season.

Dyer debuted for United States against England during the 2021 July rugby union tests. He announced his retirement from professional rugby in July 2025 via his instagram account.
