= Tavite Lopeti =

United States rugby union player

- Born: 20 November 1998 (age 27) Hayward, California
- Height: 1.80 m (5 ft 11 in)
- Weight: 95 kg (15.0 st; 209 lb)
- University: Saint Mary's College of California

Rugby union career
- Position: Centre
Amateur team(s)
Years	Team	Apps	(Points)
2024	Mystic River Rugby Club		
Senior career
Years	Team	Apps	(Points)
2022–2024	Seattle Seawolves	44	(40)
2025–2026	San Diego Legion	15	(10)
2026–	Chicago Hounds	7	(10)
- Correct as of 21 February 2025
International career
Years	Team	Apps	(Points)
2021–	United States	21	(20)
- Correct as of 21 February 2025

Tavite Lopeti (born 20 November 1998) is a United States rugby union player, currently playing for the Chicago Hounds of Major League Rugby (MLR) and the United States national team. His preferred position is centre.

== Rugby career ==
=== Seattle Seawolves ===
In 2021, Lopeti was the third overall pick in the Major League Rugby Collegiate Draft and signed for the Seattle Seawolves for the 2022 MLR season. His MLR debut was against the Toronto Arrows on 06 February, playing inside center for the full 80 minutes. Lopeti was awarded MLR's Rookie of the Year honors in 2022, and would go on to score 40 points in 44 appearances during his two years in Seattle.

=== San Diego Legion ===
In the fall of 2024 Lopeti played with Mystic River Rugby Club in the American Rugby Premiership, helping them to an ARP title before signing with the San Diego Legion ahead of the 2025 Major League Rugby season. On 16 February 2025, Lopeti would make his Legion debut at outside center, in a 45–33 win over his former club, Seattle.

=== United States ===
Lopeti debuted for United States against New Zealand during the 2021 end-of-year rugby union internationals.
