= Ruben de Haas =

United States rugby union player (b. 1998)

- Full name: Ruben Pieter de Haas
- Born: October 9, 1998 (age 28) George, South Africa
- Height: 5 ft 11 in (1.80 m)
- Weight: 190 lb (86 kg)
- School: Jessieville High School, Arkansas, USA
- Notable relative(s): Pieter de Haas (father) / Gerard de Haas (grandfather)

Rugby union career
- Position: Scrum-half
- Current team: Chicago Hounds
Youth career
- 2015 - 2017: Little Rock Rugby Club AR USA
Amateur team(s)
Years	Team	Apps	(Points)
- Free State Cheetahs U19
2018	CUT Ixias		
- Correct as of 21 May 2018
Senior career
Years	Team	Apps	(Points)
2018–2019	Free State Cheetahs	10	(0)
2019–2020	Cheetahs	18	(15)
2021–2023	Saracens	23	(0)
2021–2026	US MLR	30	(25)
- Correct as of 8 July 2025
International career
Years	Team	Apps	(Points)
2016	United States U19	2	
2016–2017	United States U20	6	(7)
2017	USA Selects	3	(5)
2018–present	USA Eagles	49	(38)
- Correct as of 8 July 2025

Ruben Pieter de Haas (born October 9, 1998) is a rugby union player who plays scrum-half for the United States men's national team. He previously played for Saracens in the English Premiership and the Cheetahs in the SA Currie Cup and the 2024-25 EPCR Challenge Cup in Europe.

== Early life ==
Ruben de Haas was born on October 9, 1998, in George, South Africa, the son of Pieter de Haas and grandson of Gerard de Haas, both of whom were well-known rugby players who played for the Lions and Bulls respectively in South Africa. De Haas immigrated with his family to the USA at the age of 10 and attended Jessieville High School in Arkansas where he played gridiron football and basketball. At age 15, he started traveling to Little Rock to play rugby for the Little Rock Junior Stormers, the only high-school rugby team at the time in the state of Arkansas.

== Professional career ==
=== Cheetahs ===
After having represented the United States at age-grade level (see sections below), De Haas signed an academy contract with South African provincial union the Free State Cheetahs in July 2017 after graduating from High School. He played for the Free State U19 side in the 2017 Under-19 Provincial Championship, and also played for university side the CUT Ixias in the 2018 Varsity Cup, before making his first class debut in South African domestic competition, for the Free State XV in their 2018 Rugby Challenge match against the Griffons.

In May 2018, the Free State Cheetahs announced that he signed a contract with the Cheetahs – the union's professional team – until the end of October 2020. In 2021 English Premiership giants Saracens signed De Haas on a 2 year deal where-after he returned for a second stint with the Cheetahs.

=== Saracens ===
It was announced in February 2021 that De Haas would join Saracens ahead of the 2021–22 Premiership season and he made 23 appearances for the club.

== International career ==
=== Youth teams ===
De Haas first represented the United States as a member of the United States men's national under-17 team (High School All-Americans) in their 2015 tour of France and Belgium. In 2016 De Haas captained the US National All Americans on a 2 match tour to Canada.

De Haas debuted with the United States men's national under-20 team (Junior All-Americans) in the 2016 World Rugby Under 20 Trophy. De Haas made his first appearance for the Junior All-Americans as a 65th minute substitute in a 46–44 loss to Namibia on April 19. De Haas made his first start at scrum-half for the Junior All-Americans in their 32–12 victory over Hong Kong on April 23.

De Haas also made two appearances for the Junior All-Americans in 2017 World Rugby Under 20 Trophy qualification matches. He scored one conversion in the Junior All-Americans' 46–12 defeat to Canada on June 13, 2017. He also scored one conversion and one penalty goal in the Junior All-American's 27–25 victory over Canada on June 17, 2017. De Haas served as the vice captain of the Junior All-Americans.

=== USA Selects ===
De Haas made his first appearance with the USA Selects on October 7, 2017, starting at scrum-half in the Selects' 48–26 defeat to Samoa in the 2017 Americas Pacific Challenge. De Haas scored his first try for the Selects on October 15, 2017, appearing as a substitute in the Selects' 45–26 victory over Canada.

=== USA Eagles ===
De Haas made his debut with the USA Eagles 8 months after graduating from High School on February 17, 2018, appearing as a substitute in the Eagles' 45–13 victory over Chile in the 2018 Americas Rugby Championship. De Haas played 4 matches for the U.S. at the 2019 Rugby World Cup in Japan and 49 caps in total to date.
