= Bryce Campbell (rugby union) =

American rugby union player (born 1994)

- Born: September 21, 1994 (age 32) Indianapolis, Indiana, United States
- Height: 6 ft 2 in (1.88 m)
- Weight: 235 lb (107 kg)
- University: Indiana University

Rugby union career
- Position: Centre
Amateur team(s)
Years	Team	Apps	(Points)
2014–2017	Indiana		
Senior career
Years	Team	Apps	(Points)
2017–2018	Glendale Raptors	7	(20)
2018–2020	London Irish	17	(15)
2021–2022	Austin Gilgronis	29	(15)
2022–2025	Chicago Hounds	48	(20)
- Correct as of 30 July 2025
International career
Years	Team	Apps	(Points)
2016–2017	USA Selects	6	(0)
2016–2024	United States	47	(40)
- Correct as of 30 July 2025

Bryce Campbell (born September 21, 1994) is an American former rugby union player who played for the Chicago Hounds, Austin Gilgronis, and Glendale Raptors of Major League Rugby (MLR), London Irish, and the United States national rugby union team.

== Amateur career ==
Campbell began playing rugby with the Royal Irish at Cathedral High School in Indianapolis. He studied business at Indiana University, and toured Australia with the College All-Americans in 2015.

== Professional career ==
Campbell spent a season with the Glendale Raptors of Major League Rugby in 2018, reaching the MLR Championship game against the Seattle Seawolves.

Campbell signed for London Irish for the 2018–19 season. He was released ahead of the 2020–21 season. He signed with MLR's Austin Gilgronis for the 2021 season and became the team's captain, the 4th in franchise history.

== International ==
Campbell first rose to national prominence when one of his runs playing for the USA Selects against Canada A appeared on ESPN's highlights.

Campbell debuted for the United States national team in November 2016, and played for the U.S. the following week against Romania in November 2016. In May 2025 Campbell retired from professional rugby and began working as the general manager and sports activities director with Riverside Sports Properties LLC.
