= Jamason Faʻanana-Schultz =

American rugby union player

- Born: Jamason Faʻanana-Schultz; 13 June 1996 (age 30) Ipswich, Queensland, Australia
- Height: 1.88 m (6 ft 2 in)
- Weight: 120 kg (18 st 13 lb)
- School: Ipswich Grammar School
- University: University of Queensland; University of Sydney

Rugby union career
- Position(s): Flanker; Number 8
Youth career
- 2010–2016: Queensland Reds Academy
Amateur team(s)
Years	Team	Apps	(Points)
2016–2017	Southern Districts	11	(30)
- Correct as of 20 January 2021
Senior career
Years	Team	Apps	(Points)
2017	Auckland	1	(0)
2018–2019	Red Hurricanes	10	(0)
2019	Houston Sabercats	8	(15)
2019	Kurita Water Gush	10	(5)
2020–	Old Glory DC	54	(20)
- Correct as of 28 March 2022
International career
Years	Team	Apps	(Points)
2015	Samoa U20		
2019–	United States	13	(25)
- Correct as of 16 September 2021

Jamason Faʻanana-Schultz (born 13 June 1996) is a rugby union player who plays as a flanker or number 8. He currently plays for Old Glory DC of Major League Rugby (MLR). Although born and raised in Australia, he has played for the United States national rugby union team, having qualified through his American-born father.

== Rugby career ==
Faʻanana-Schultz was born and raised in Australia and got his start in rugby there. He spent time in the Queensland Reds academy system and played for Queensland University. In 2016 he joined Southern Districts in the Shute Shield, and a successful campaign led to him joining the Warratahs of Super Rugby on a development contract, although he didn't play for them. In 2017, he played in one match for Auckland in the NPC.

His professional debut came in 2018 with the Red Hurricanes of the Top Challenge League in Japan. He then signed with the Houston SaberCats in Major League Rugby (MLR). At the end of the 2019 MLR season, he returned to Japan, playing for the Kurita Water Gush in the Japan Top League.

In 2020, he joined MLR expansion team Old Glory DC. He became a fixture on the team, starting every match he was available for through his first two seasons with the team.

== International career ==
In 2015, Faʻanana-Schultz represented Samoa internationally at the u20 level.

He was also qualified to play internationally for the United States, courtesy of his father being born in San Francisco, California. He debuted for the USA Eagles in 2019 against Canada in the Pacific Nations Cup, earning two caps in that competition. He was not selected for the 2019 Rugby World Cup, but once again played for the USA in the summer of 2021, earning three more caps.
