= Paul Mullen (rugby union) =

US international rugby union player

- Born: 16 November 1991 (age 34) Inishmore, Ireland
- Height: 1.82 m (6 ft 0 in)
- Weight: 122 kg (19 st 3 lb; 269 lb)
- School: Glenstal Abbey School
- University: Texas A&M University
- Notable relative: Eoin Mullen

Rugby union career
- Position: Prop
- Current team: Old Glory DC
Youth career
- 2008–2009: Munster U18
- 2009–2010: Munster U19
- 2010–2011: Munster U20
Amateur team(s)
Years	Team	Apps	(Points)
–	Houston Athletic RC		
–	Galveston RFC		
- Correct as of 13 September 2018
Senior career
Years	Team	Apps	(Points)
2018	Houston SaberCats	3	(0)
2018–2019	Newcastle Falcons	1	(0)
2018–2019	Doncaster Knights (loan)	2	(0)
2018-2019	Houston SaberCats	7	(0)
2020	San Diego Legion	5	(0)
2021–2024	Utah Warriors	17	(0)
2025	NOLA Gold		
- Old Glory DC
- Correct as of 5 April 2022
Provincial / State sides
Years	Team	Apps	(Points)
2014	Texas Rugby Union All-Stars		
International career
Years	Team	Apps	(Points)
2010	Ireland U19		
2011	United States U20		
2018–2026	United States	39	(0)
- Correct as of 4 November 2026

Paul Mullen (born 16 November 1991) is an Irish-American rugby union player who plays prop for the Utah Warriors of Major League Rugby (MLR) and the United States men's national team. Mullen previously played for the Houston SaberCats, the San Diego Legion and the Newcastle Falcons.

== Early life ==
Mullen is originally from the Aran Islands, County Galway, Ireland. He first played rugby at the age of 13, while attending the Glenstal Abbey School. Mullen played rugby there from 2004 until 2009. Mullen also attended school at The King's Hospital, playing rugby there from 2009 until 2010.

Mullen also played age-grade rugby for Munster before moving to the United States to attend Texas A&M University. There, Mullen earned his bachelor's degree in marine engineering technology in 2015 and his master's degree in marine resources management in 2017. While living in Texas, Mullen played Gaelic Football with the Houston Gaels while at the same time he continued to play amateur rugby and also became a referee with the Texas Rugby Union. He is the brother of Irish racing cyclist Eoin Mullen.

== Club career ==
Mullen signed with the Houston SaberCats for Major League Rugby's inaugural 2018 season. Mullen made his debut with the SaberCats on 19 May 2018, starting at tighthead prop in the SaberCats' 24–20 loss to the New Orleans Gold.

In August 2018, Mullen signed a four-month contract to play for the Newcastle Falcons in England's Premiership Rugby.

Following a short stint in England, Mullen signed a one-year deal with the Houston Sabercats.

After the 2019 Rugby World Cup in Japan, Mullen signed for the San Diego Legion for the 2020 season.

== International career ==
=== USA Junior All-Americans ===
Mullen made his debut representing the United States playing for the United States men's national under-20 team (Junior All-Americans) in the 2011 IRB Junior World Rugby Trophy, scoring a crucial try against Zimbabwe.

=== USA Eagles ===
In May 2018, Mullen was selected for the USA Eagles' roster for the 2018 mid-year tests. Mullen made his debut for USA Eagles on 9 June 2018, starting at prop in a 62–13 victory against Russia. Mullen is qualified to represent the United States at the international level on account of having an American grandparent.

=== Rugby World Cup ===
Mullen was selected to represent the USA Eagles in the 2019 Rugby World Cup in Japan. Mullen played in all four pool games against England, France, Argentina and Tonga.
