= Nate Augspurger =

US international rugby union player

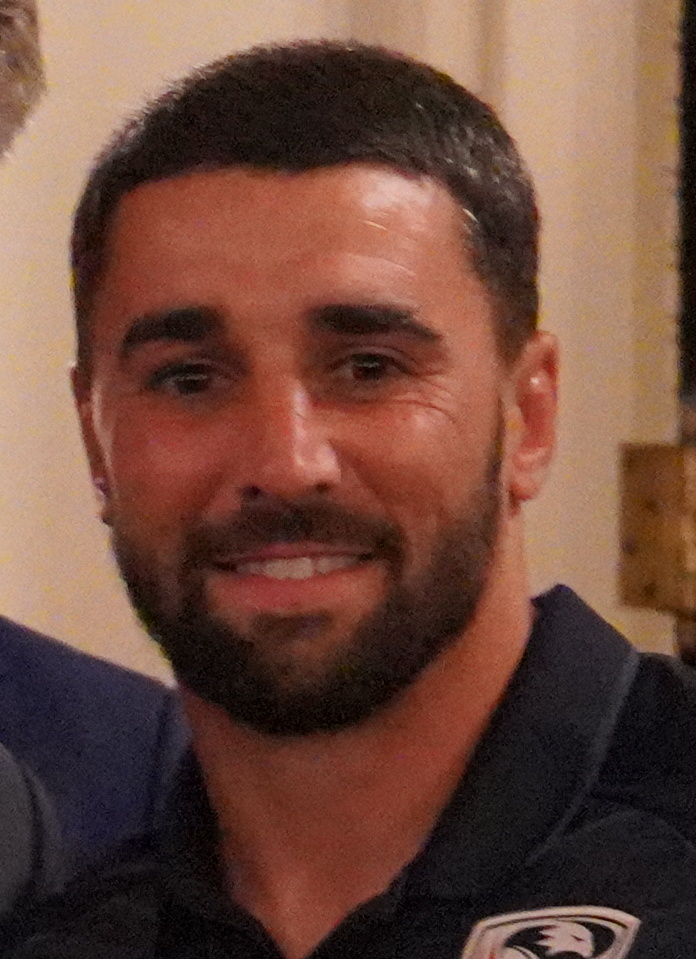
- Born: January 31, 1990 (age 36) Minneapolis, Minnesota, United States
- Height: 5 ft 7 in (1.70 m)
- Weight: 180 lb (12 st 12 lb; 82 kg)
- School: Minneapolis Southwest
- University: University of Minnesota

Rugby union career
- Position: Scrum-half
- Current team: Chicago Hounds
Senior career
Years	Team	Apps	(Points)
2018–	San Diego Legion	58	(112)
- Correct as of March 25, 2024
International career
Years	Team	Apps	(Points)
2016–	United States	41	(55)
- Correct as of March 25, 2024
National sevens team
Years	Team		Comps
2012–2016	United States		15
- Correct as of December 30, 2020

Nate Augspurger (born January 31, 1990) is an American rugby union player who plays scrum-half for the Chicago Hounds of Major League Rugby (MLR).

== Professional rugby career ==
Augspurger has been a member of the United States national rugby sevens team since the 2012–13 Sevens World Series. He debuted on the World Series Circuit in Dubai and Port Elizabeth, 2012. Augspurger battled injury through his first year as a full-time USA sevens resident, which led to missing out on the 7's RWC in Russia, 2013. In 2013, Nate played with the New York City 7's in the inaugural World Club Series Sevens tournament at Twickenham. He was the first player to score a try in the tournament against the Western Province, and the NYC 7's went on to win the Plate Championship.

Augspurger had a brief tour with the USA Men's XVs in the Americas Rugby Championships in the fall of 2014. In 2015 when Augspurger was invited back into the USA sevens program after showing well in the Las Vegas Invitational. Mike Friday, the new USA Sevens Head Coach, selected Augspurger for the World Series Circuit in 2015 to Hong Kong and Japan. He was then selected to Glasgow and London Sevens to finish the World Series season, where the USA went on to win their first ever tournament final at Twickenham at the London Sevens. He was also a member of the same sevens team that won a bronze medal at the 2015 Pan American Games. Augspurger then was offered a full-time resident contract with the sevens team from 2015 to 2016 leading up to the 2016 Rio de Janeiro Olympics. Augspurger was selected for every tournament in the 2015–2016 season. He was selected for the Olympic qualifier tournament where the USA qualified for the 2016 games. Augspurger was selected to the 2016 Olympic games as a traveling reserve player. After that tournament, Augspurger made a code switch from Sevens to fifteens where he continued his USA rugby career.

Augspurger received his first USA XV cap against Italy in the summer of 2016. He started at scrum half in the Eagles 20–24 loss to Italy. Augspurger became Eagle no. 491. He received his second cap against Russia that summer and that fall played scrum-half against the NZ Maori All Blacks (non test), Romania, and Tonga. The 2017 international season started with the Americas Rugby Championship where Augspurger got his first start on the wing against Brazil. The Eagles went on to win the 2017 ARC Championship against the Argentina XV, where he started on the wing and was named the captain. In 2019 Augspurger captained USA against Ireland in the New Jersey Red Bull Arena. He then started the next three tests against Georgia and two games against Canada. The USA qualified for the 2019 World Cup that summer, beating Canada in the second test in San Diego, California. It was the USA Men's XVs first ever RWC qualification as Americas #1. In the fall of 2017, Augspurger was selected off the bench for tests against Germany and Georgia.

By 2018, the Major League Rugby professional competition had begun. Augspurger signed for the San Diego Legion under Head Coach Rob Hoadley. In 2018, Nate was again selected for the 2018 Americas Rugby Championship. He started every match, both at scrum half and at wing for new Eagles Head Coach Gary Gold. He captained the US to a 61–19 victory over Uruguay to become back-to-back champions of the ARC. Augspurger returned to the Legion for the last season game and playoffs. He started on the wing and scored a late try in the playoff loss. Augspurger continued to play a pivotal role in the Eagles team. He was selected off the bench in the first ever Tier I nation victory over Scotland in 2018.

In late 2018 Augspurger ruptured a quadriceps tendon, but missed only the first week of the 2019 MLR season. He then played in every game for the Legion on the way to a 13–3 record and home field advantage. The Legion lost in the championship match, on the last play of the game to the Seattle Seawolves. Augspurger was named the MLR First XV team at scrum half. After the Legion season, Augspurger reported to the USA Eagles RWC preparation. He starred off the bench against Samoa and Japan in the Pacific Nations Cup. After that tour, Augspurger was named to the 2019 Rugby World Cup USA Eagles team. At the Rugby World Cup, Augspurger missed out against England and France, but then was selected off the bench for the Argentina and Tonga matches.

Augspurger reported back to the San Diego Legion for MLR 2020. This season was cancelled after the Legion started the competition 5–0. In 2021, Augspurger played three MLR matches before fracturing his ankle against the LA Giltinis. Augspurger returned from injury in 9 weeks. He came off the bench in one match and started the last two matches at scrum-half to finish the 2021 Legion Season. He went on to be selected again for the USA Eagles. Augspurger came off the bench twice against Canada as the Eagles would advance to play for Americas #2 spot. Augspurger would come off the bench in both matches, a win at home and a loss in Uruguay. Augspurger started at scrum-half against the All Blacks in front of 40,000 people at FedEx Field in Washington D.C. Augspurger became the first ever USA Eagle to score a try against the All Blacks.

In 2022, the Legion were 5–3 when Augspurger went down against the Utah Warriors with a knee injury. He would spend the next 8 weeks rehabbing his injury and return to play schedule. He came off the bench in their last match of the season. The Legion finished the season 8–8 and due to MLR disqualification, qualified for the playoffs. Augspurger would start, score a try and play 60 minutes before being substituted in the 19–43 loss to Seattle.

== Personal life ==
Augspurger is married to Rosie Augspurger. Augspurger is a Christian.
