= Luke Carty =

American rugby union player

- Born: 24 September 1997 (age 29) Athlone, Ireland
- Height: 1.76 m (5 ft 9 1/2 in)
- Weight: 90 kg (14 st; 200 lb)
- School: Marist College
- University: NUI Galway J.E. Cairnes School of Business and Economics
- Notable relative: Jack Carty (brother)

Rugby union career
- Position: Fly-half / Fullback
Amateur team(s)
| Years | Team | Apps | (Points) |
| 2016–2019 | Buccaneers RFC | | |
Senior career
| Years | Team | Apps | (Points) |
| 2016–2019 | Connacht A | 10 | (22) |
| 2021–2022 | LA Giltinis | 18 | (50) |
| 2023– | Chicago Hounds | 16 | (69) |
- Correct as of 21 January 2024
International career
| Years | Team | Apps | (Points) |
| 2021– | United States | 27 | (127) |
- Correct as of 26 November 2025

Luke Carty (born 24 September 1997) is an Irish-born American rugby union player who currently plays for the Chicago Hounds in Major League Rugby (MLR). He also plays for the United States national rugby union team. He is the younger brother of Jack Carty who plays for Ireland.

== Amateur career ==
Carty began playing rugby at Marist College in Athlone where he won two Connacht Senior Cups in 2012 and 2013.

== Professional career ==
Carty was selected for the Connacht A team in 2016 and played for the club in 2016, 2017 and 2018. He also played several seasons for the Buccaneers and was named their Player of the Year in 2019. In 2021, he moved to the United States and signed with Major League Rugby team, the LA Giltinis. Following two years with LA, including an appearance of the bench in the Giltinis’ championship game win over Rugby Atlanta in 2021, Carty signed with the Chicago Hounds for the 2023 season.

== International ==
Carty was selected for the Irish squad at the 2017 World Rugby Under 20 Championship as an injury replacement.

Carty qualified to play for the USA through his New York-born grandmother. Carty debuted for the United States national team in July 2021, playing against England in the 2021 July rugby union tests.

== Personal life ==
Luke Carty attended NUI Galway from 2016 to 2018, earning a Bachelor of Commerce Degree. He is currently attending Michael Smurfit Graduate Business School at University College Dublin working towards a Master's of International Business.

== Honours ==
Marist College

- Connacht Senior Cup (2): 2012, 2013

LA Giltinis

- Major League Rugby Championship (1): 2021

Individual

- Buccaneers RFC Player of the Year (1): 2019
