= Moni Tongaʻuiha =

United States rugby union player

- Born: Tesimoni Tongaʻuiha; 5 October 1994 (age 32) Oakland, California, United States
- Height: 1.88 m (6 ft 2 in)
- Weight: 102 kg (16.1 st; 225 lb)

Rugby union career
- Position: Flanker
Amateur team(s)
Years	Team	Apps	(Points)
2025	Mystic River Rugby Club		
Senior career
Years	Team	Apps	(Points)
2018–	New Orleans Gold	40	(30)
- Correct as of 3 October 2021
International career
Years	Team	Apps	(Points)
2021–	United States	1	(0)
- Correct as of 3 October 2021

Moni Tongaʻuiha (born 5 October 1994) is a United States rugby union player, currently playing for the New Orleans Gold of Major League Rugby (MLR) and the United States national team. His preferred position is flanker.

== Professional career ==
Tongaʻuiha signed for Major League Rugby side New Orleans Gold for the 2021 Major League Rugby season, having represented the side since 2018.

Tongaʻuiha debuted for United States against Canada during the 2023 Rugby World Cup – Americas qualification.
