= List of 2020–21 Super Rugby transfers =

This is a list of player movements for Super Rugby teams prior to the end of the 2021 Super Rugby season. Departure and arrivals of all players that were included in a Super Rugby squad for 2020 or 2021 are listed here, regardless of when it occurred. Future-dated transfers are only included if confirmed by the player or his agent, his former team or his new team.

In addition to the main squad, teams can also name additional players that train in backup or development squads for the franchises. These players are denoted by (wider training group) for New Zealand teams, or (development squad) for Australian teams.

Notes

- 2020 players listed are all players that were named in the initial senior squad, or subsequently included in a 23-man match day squad at any game during the season.
- (did not play) denotes that a player did not play at all during one of the two seasons due to injury or non-selection. These players are included to indicate they were contracted to the team. For the 2020 season, Super Rugby was suspended after 7 rounds of matches due to the COVID-19 pandemic, with regional tournaments taking place there after. Players listed as 'did not play' did not feature in any of the 7 rounds of matches played that season.
- (short-term) denotes that a player wasn't initially contracted, but came in during the season. This could either be a club rugby player coming in as injury cover, or a player whose contract had expired at another team (typically in the northern hemisphere).
- Flags are only shown for players moving to or from another country.
- Players may play in several positions, but are listed in only one.

== Argentina ==
=== Jaguares ===
The Jaguares were not named in a Super Rugby season in 2021. They had been rumoured to be joining an expanded Súper Liga Americana de Rugby competition, but were not named in the 2021 season of the tournament. The Jaguares won't play in 2021 and all players will depart the team either overseas, or enter the draft for the 2021 Súper Liga Americana de Rugby season.

Jaguares transfers 2020–2021
| Pos | 2020 squad | Out | In | 2021 players |
|---|---|---|---|---|
| PR | Javier Díaz; Santiago Medrano; Joel Sclavi; Lucio Sordoni; Nahuel Tetaz Chaparro; Mayco Vivas; Juan Pablo Zeiss (did not play) | (substituted off) Javier Díaz (to (Paraguay) Olímpia Lions); (substituted off) Santiago Medrano (to (Australia) Force); (substituted off) Joel Sclavi (to Jaguares XV); (substituted off) Lucio Sordoni (to (Australia) Rebels); (substituted off) Nahuel Tetaz Chaparro (to (England) Bristol Bears); (substituted off) Mayco Vivas (to Jaguares XV); (substituted off) Juan Pablo Zeiss (to Jaguares XV) | —N/a | —N/a |
| HK | Agustín Creevy; Julián Montoya; Santiago Socino | (substituted off) Agustín Creevy (to (England) London Irish); (substituted off) Julián Montoya (to (England) Leicester Tigers); (substituted off) Santiago Socino (to (England) Gloucester) | —N/a | —N/a |
| LK | Matías Alemanno; Ignacio Calas (did not play); Marcos Kremer; Lucas Paulos; Guido Petti | (substituted off) Matías Alemanno (to (England) Gloucester); (substituted off) Ignacio Calas (to (Australia) Rebels); (substituted off) Marcos Kremer (to (France) Stade Français); (substituted off) Lucas Paulos (to (France) Brive); (substituted off) Guido Petti (to (France) Bordeaux) | —N/a | —N/a |
| FL | Francisco Gorrissen; Santiago Grondona; Tomás Lezana; Santiago Montagner (did not play); Javier Ortega Desio; Juan Bautista Pedemonte | (substituted off) Francisco Gorrissen (to Jaguares XV); (substituted off) Santiago Grondona (to (England) Newcastle Falcons); (substituted off) Tomás Lezana (to (Australia) Force); (substituted off) Santiago Montagner (to (France) Mont-de-Marsan); (substituted off) Javier Ortega Desio (to Jaguares XV); (substituted off) Juan Bautista Pedemonte (injured) | —N/a | —N/a |
| N8 | Rodrigo Bruni | (substituted off) Rodrigo Bruni (to (France) Vannes) | —N/a | —N/a |
| SH | Gonzalo Bertranou; Tomás Cubelli; Felipe Ezcurra | (substituted off) Gonzalo Bertranou (to (Wales) Dragons); (substituted off) Tomás Cubelli (to (Australia) Force); (substituted off) Felipe Ezcurra (to Jaguares XV) | —N/a | —N/a |
| FH | Tomás Albornoz; Joaquín Díaz Bonilla; Domingo Miotti | (substituted off) Tomás Albornoz (to Jaguares XV); (substituted off) Joaquín Díaz Bonilla (to (England) Leicester Tigers); (substituted off) Domingo Miotti (to (Australia) Force) | —N/a | —N/a |
| CE | Santiago Carreras; Juan Pablo Castro (did not play); Santiago Chocobares; Jerónimo de la Fuente; Lucas Mensa (did not play); Matías Orlando | (substituted off) Santiago Carreras (to (England) Gloucester); (substituted off) Juan Pablo Castro (to Jaguares XV); (substituted off) Santiago Chocobares (to Jaguares XV); (substituted off) Jerónimo de la Fuente (to (France) Perpignan); (substituted off) Lucas Mensa (to (France) Valence Romans); (substituted off) Matías Orlando (to (England) Newcastle Falcons) | —N/a | —N/a |
| WG | Emiliano Boffelli; Sebastián Cancelliere; Mateo Carreras (did not play); Juan Cruz Mallía; Matías Moroni | (substituted off) Emiliano Boffelli (to (France) Racing 92); (substituted off) Sebastián Cancelliere (to Jaguares XV); (substituted off) Mateo Carreras (to (England) Newcastle Falcons); (substituted off) Juan Cruz Mallía (to (France) Toulouse); (substituted off) Matías Moroni (to (England) Leicester Tigers) | —N/a | —N/a |
| FB | Bautista Delguy; Joaquín Tuculet | (substituted off) Bautista Delguy (to (France) Bordeaux); (substituted off) Joaquín Tuculet (to (Canada) Toronto Arrows) | —N/a | —N/a |
| Coach | Gonzalo Quesada | (substituted off) Gonzalo Quesada (to (France) Stade Français) | —N/a | —N/a |

== Japan ==
=== Sunwolves ===
In March 2019, the Japan Rugby Football Union announced that the Sunwolves Super Rugby licence would be discontinued, after failing to negotiate a new contract with SANZAAR for the 2021 season due to financial considerations.

Sunwolves transfers 2020–2021
| Pos | 2020 squad | Out | In | 2021 squad |
|---|---|---|---|---|
| PR | Jarred Adams; Chang Ho Ahn (training squad, did not play); Sione Asi (did not play); Kaku Bunkei (training squad, did not play); Chris Eves; Nic Mayhew; Yuichiro Taniguchi (training squad, did not play); Conraad van Vuuren; Hencus van Wyk | (substituted off) Jarred Adams (to Munakata Sanix Blues); (substituted off) Chang Ho Ahn (to Canon Eagles); (substituted off) Sione Asi (to (New Zealand) Old Boys Oamaru); (substituted off) Kaku Bunkei (returned to Setsunan University); (substituted off) Chris Eves (to (New Zealand) Manawatu); (substituted off) Nic Mayhew (to (New Zealand) North Harbour); (substituted off) Yuichiro Taniguchi (returned to Tenri University); (substituted off) Conraad van Vuuren (to (South Africa) Free State Cheetahs); (substituted off) Hencus van Wyk (to NTT Red Hurricanes) | —N/a | —N/a |
| HK | Leni Apisai; Jaba Bregvadze; Mamoru Harada (training squad, did not play); Efi Ma'afu | (substituted off) Leni Apisai (to (New Zealand) Blues); (substituted off) Jaba Bregvadze (to Agen); (substituted off) Mamoru Harada (returned to Keio University); (substituted off) Efi Ma'afu (to Canon Eagles) | —N/a | —N/a |
| LK | Justin Downey; Ryuga Hashimoto (training squad, did not play); Ben Hyne; Tom Rowe (did not play); Michael Stolberg; Corey Thomas; Kotaro Yatabe | (substituted off) Justin Downey (to Tokyo Gas); (substituted off) Ryuga Hashimoto (returned to Meiji University); (substituted off) Tom Rowe (to Kyuden Voltex); (substituted off) Michael Stolberg (to Kintetsu Liners); (substituted off) Corey Thomas (to (United States) LA Giltinis); (substituted off) Kotaro Yatabe (returned to Panasonic Wild Knights) | —N/a | —N/a |
| FL | Mitch Jacobson; Mateaki Kafatolu (did not play); Asiperli Moala (training squad, did not play); Shunsuke Nunomaki; Brendon O'Connor; Tevita Tupou | (substituted off) Mitch Jacobson (to (New Zealand) Waikato); (substituted off) Mateaki Kafatolu (to (New Zealand) Wellington); (substituted off) Asiperli Moala (returned to Tenri University); (substituted off) Shunsuke Nunomaki (returned to Panasonic Wild Knights); (substituted off) Brendon O'Connor (to (New Zealand) Crusaders); (substituted off) Tevita Tupou (to Kintetsu Liners) | —N/a | —N/a |
| N8 | Onehunga Havili (did not play); Jake Schatz; Kyo Yoshida | (substituted off) Onehunga Havili (to (France) Aurillac); (substituted off) Jake Schatz (to Tokyo Gas); (substituted off) Kyo Yoshida (returned to Toyota Verblitz) | —N/a | —N/a |
| SH | Kenta Fukuda (did not play); Takahiro Kimura; Rudy Paige; Naoto Saito | (substituted off) Kenta Fukuda (returned to Toyota Verblitz); (substituted off) Takahiro Kimura (to Coca-Cola Red Sparks); (substituted off) Naoto Saito (to Suntory Sungoliath) | —N/a | —N/a |
| FH | Garth April; Jumpei Ogura | (substituted off) Garth April (to Shimizu Blue Sharks); (substituted off) Jumpei Ogura (to Canon Eagles) | —N/a | —N/a |
| CE | JJ Engelbrecht; Siosaia Fifita; Alex Horan; Jordan Jackson-Hope; Shogo Nakano; Ben Te'o | (substituted off) Siosaia Fifita (returned to Tenri University); (substituted off) Alex Horan (retired); (substituted off) Jordan Jackson-Hope (to Tokyo Gas); (substituted off) Shogo Nakano (to Suntory Sungoliath); (substituted off) Ben Te'o (to (Australia) Brisbane Broncos) | —N/a | —N/a |
| WG | James Dargaville; Burua Inoke (did not play); Tautalatasi Tasi | (substituted off) James Dargaville (to Yamaha Júbilo); (substituted off) Burua Inoke (returned to Ryutsu Keizai University); (substituted off) Tautalatasi Tasi (to (Australia) Gordon) | —N/a | —N/a |
| FB | Hiroki Kumoyama (training squad, did not play); Ben Lucas (did not play); Keisuke Moriya; Yoshizumi Takeda | (substituted off) Hiroki Kumoyama (returned to Meiji University); (substituted off) Ben Lucas (to Coca-Cola Red Sparks); (substituted off) Keisuke Moriya (returned to Panasonic Wild Knights); (substituted off) Yoshizumi Takeda (to Kintetsu Liners) | —N/a | —N/a |
| Coach | Naoya Okubo | (substituted off) Naoya Okubo (to Yamaha Júbilo) | —N/a | —N/a |

== See also ==
- List of 2020–21 Premiership Rugby transfers
- List of 2020–21 Pro14 transfers
- List of 2020–21 Top 14 transfers
- List of 2020–21 RFU Championship transfers
- List of 2020–21 Major League Rugby transfers
- SANZAAR
- Super Rugby franchise areas
