= 2020 end-of-year rugby union internationals =

The 2020 end of year rugby union tests, also referred to as the 2020 Autumn internationals in the Northern Hemisphere, were a number of rugby union test matches contested during the months of October, November and December 2020, primarily involving countries from the Northern Hemisphere hosting those from the Southern Hemisphere. Also involved in matches were those from second-tier teams. These international games counted towards World Rugby's ranking system, with a team typically playing from two to four matches during this period.

Due to the COVID-19 pandemic causing a delay or cancellation of many nations' scheduled matches, a different format was developed for this year. The Autumn Nations Cup, an eight-team tournament involving England, Fiji, France, Georgia, Ireland, Italy, Scotland and Wales, replaced the cancelled matches. Also as a result of the pandemic, this year's fixtures incorporated postponed matches from the 2020 Six Nations Championship and 2020 Rugby Europe Championship, the 2020 South American Rugby Championship and all matches from the 2020 Tri Nations Series.

== Fixtures ==
=== Bledisloe Cup – Part 1 ===
11 October 2020
16:00 NZDT (UTC+13)

New Zealand	16–16	Australia
Try: J. Barrett 9' m Smith 44' m Pen: J. Barrett (2/3) 27', 79'	Report	Try: Koroibete 53' m Daugunu 63' m Pen: O'Connor (2/3) 31', 74'

Wellington Regional Stadium, Wellington
Attendance: 31,020
Referee: Paul Williams (New Zealand)

Team details

FB	15	Damian McKenzie	(substituted off) 68'
RW	14	Jordie Barrett
OC	13	Rieko Ioane	(substituted off) 56'
IC	12	Jack Goodhue
LW	11	George Bridge
FH	10	Richie Mo'unga
SH	9	Aaron Smith	(substituted off) 75'
N8	8	Ardie Savea
OF	7	Sam Cane (c)
BF	6	Shannon Frizell	(substituted off) 64'
RL	5	Sam Whitelock
LL	4	Patrick Tuipulotu	(substituted off) 74'
TP	3	Ofa Tu'ungafasi	(substituted off) 64'
HK	2	Codie Taylor	(substituted off) 58'
LP	1	Joe Moody	(substituted off) 58'
Replacements:
HK	16	Dane Coles	(substituted on) 58'
PR	17	Karl Tu'inukuafe	(substituted on) 58'
PR	18	Tyrel Lomax	(substituted on) 64'
LK	19	Tupou Vaa'i	(substituted on) 74'
FL	20	Hoskins Sotutu	(substituted on) 64'
SH	21	TJ Perenara	(substituted on) 75'
CE	22	Anton Lienert-Brown	(substituted on) 56'
WG	23	Caleb Clarke	(substituted on) 68'
Coach:
(New Zealand) Ian Foster

FB	15	Tom Banks
RW	14	Filipo Daugunu
OC	13	Hunter Paisami	(substituted off) 74'
IC	12	Matt To'omua
LW	11	Marika Koroibete
FH	10	James O'Connor
SH	9	Nic White	(substituted off) 71'
N8	8	Pete Samu
OF	7	Michael Hooper (c)
BF	6	Harry Wilson	(substituted off) 65'
RL	5	Matt Philip
LL	4	Lukhan Salakaia-Loto	(substituted off) 74'
TP	3	Taniela Tupou	(substituted off) 31'
HK	2	Folau Fainga'a	(substituted off) 60'
LP	1	James Slipper	(substituted off) 60'
Replacements:
HK	16	Jordan Uelese	(substituted on) 60'
PR	17	Scott Sio	(substituted on) 60'
PR	18	Allan Alaalatoa	(substituted on) 31'
LK	19	Rob Simmons	(substituted on) 65'
N8	20	Rob Valetini	(substituted on) 74'
SH	21	Jake Gordon	(substituted on) 71'
FH	22	Noah Lolesio
CE	23	Reece Hodge	(substituted on) 74'
Coach:
(New Zealand) Dave Rennie

Assistant referees:
Ben O'Keeffe (New Zealand)
Angus Gardner (Australia)
Television match official:
Mike Fraser (New Zealand)

Notes:

- Hoskins Sotutu, Caleb Clarke and Tupou Vaa'i (all New Zealand), and Filipo Daugunu, Hunter Paisami and Harry Wilson (all Australia) made their international debuts.
- Michael Hooper became the 12th Wallaby to earn his 100th test cap.
- This was the first draw between the two nations since they drew 12–12 at ANZ Stadium in 2014, and the first in New Zealand since they drew 9–9 at Athletic Park in 1962.
- Due to travel restrictions, the opening two matches of the Bledisloe Cup were officiated by non-neutral referees with the support of the respective unions and their coaches.
- Beauden Barrett was originally named at fullback for New Zealand, but withdrew due to an achilles injury and was replaced by Damian McKenzie. Nepo Laulala then withdrew from the bench at tighthead for personal reasons, and was replaced by Tyrel Lomax.

=== Bledisloe Cup – Part 2 ===
18 October 2020
16:00 NZDT (UTC+13)

New Zealand	27–7	Australia
Try: Smith 23' c J. Barrett 43' m Savea 47' m Cane 53' c Con: Mo'unga (1/3) 24', 54'; Pen: Mo'unga (1/1) 18'	Report	Try: Koroibete 28' c Con: O'Connor (1/1) 30'

Eden Park, Auckland
Attendance: 46,049
Referee: Angus Gardner (Australia)

Team details

FB	15	Beauden Barrett
RW	14	Jordie Barrett
OC	13	Anton Lienert-Brown	(substituted off) 17'	(substituted on) 24'
IC	12	Jack Goodhue			(substituted off) 60'	(substituted on) 69'
LW	11	Caleb Clarke	(substituted off) 67'
FH	10	Richie Mo'unga
SH	9	Aaron Smith	(substituted off) 55'
N8	8	Ardie Savea
OF	7	Sam Cane (c)
BF	6	Shannon Frizell	(substituted off) 64'
RL	5	Tupou Vaa'i	(substituted off) 52'
LL	4	Patrick Tuipulotu
TP	3	Ofa Tu'ungafasi	(substituted off) 50'
HK	2	Dane Coles	(substituted off) 50'
LP	1	Joe Moody	(substituted off) 31'
Replacements:
HK	16	Codie Taylor	(substituted on) 50'
PR	17	Alex Hodgman	(substituted on) 31'
PR	18	Nepo Laulala	(substituted on) 50'
LK	19	Scott Barrett	(substituted on) 52'
FL	20	Hoskins Sotutu	(substituted on) 64'
SH	21	TJ Perenara	(substituted on) 55'
CE	22	Peter Umaga-Jensen	(substituted on) 17'	(substituted off) 24'	(substituted on) 60'	(substituted off) 69'
FB	23	Damian McKenzie	(substituted on) 67'
Coach:
(New Zealand) Ian Foster

FB	15	Tom Banks
RW	14	Filipo Daugunu
OC	13	Hunter Paisami	(substituted off) 69'
IC	12	Matt To'omua	(substituted off) 33'
LW	11	Marika Koroibete
FH	10	James O'Connor
SH	9	Nic White	(substituted off) 58'
N8	8	Harry Wilson	(substituted off) 52'
OF	7	Michael Hooper (c)
BF	6	Ned Hanigan
RL	5	Matt Philip	(substituted off) 55'
LL	4	Lukhan Salakaia-Loto
TP	3	Taniela Tupou	(substituted off) 40'
HK	2	Brandon Paenga-Amosa	(substituted off) 52'
LP	1	James Slipper	(substituted off) 55'
Replacements:
HK	16	Jordan Uelese	(substituted on) 52'
PR	17	Scott Sio	(substituted on) 55'
PR	18	Allan Alaalatoa	(substituted on) 40'
LK	19	Rob Simmons	(substituted on) 55'
FL	20	Liam Wright	(substituted on) 52'
SH	21	Jake Gordon	(substituted on) 58'
CE	22	Jordan Petaia	(substituted on) 33'
CE	23	Reece Hodge	(substituted on) 69'
Coach:
(New Zealand) Dave Rennie

Assistant referees:
Ben O'Keeffe (New Zealand)
Paul Williams (New Zealand)
Television match official:
Mike Fraser (New Zealand)

Notes:

- Alex Hodgman and Peter Umaga-Jensen (both New Zealand) made their international debuts.
- Rieko Ioane was originally named on the bench but ruled out on match day and was replaced by Peter Umaga-Jensen.
- Due to travel restrictions, the opening two matches of the Bledisloe Cup were officiated by non-neutral referees with the support of the respective unions and their coaches.

=== 23/25 October ===
23 October 2020
19:30 BST (UTC+01)

Scotland	48–7	Georgia
Try: Graham (2) 2' c, 75' m Brown (2) 27' m, 50' m Watson 32' m McInally 62' c Van der Merwe 70' c Kinghorn 79' c Con: Hastings (4/8) 4', 62', 71', 80'	Report	Try: Tabutsadze 45' c Con: Abzhandadze (1/1) 46'

Murrayfield Stadium, Edinburgh
Attendance: 0
Referee: Alexandre Ruiz (France)

Team details

FB	15	Blair Kinghorn
RW	14	Darcy Graham
OC	13	Chris Harris
IC	12	James Lang	(substituted off) 55'
LW	11	Duhan van der Merwe
FH	10	Adam Hastings
SH	9	Ali Price	(substituted off) 65'
N8	8	Matt Fagerson	(substituted off) 38'
OF	7	Hamish Watson	(substituted off) 65'
BF	6	Jamie Ritchie
RL	5	Scott Cummings	(substituted off) 71'
LL	4	Ben Toolis
TP	3	Zander Fagerson	(substituted off) 55'
HK	2	Fraser Brown (c)	(substituted off) 55'
LP	1	Rory Sutherland	(substituted off) 55'
Replacements:
HK	16	Stuart McInally	(substituted on) 55'
PR	17	Oli Kebble	(substituted on) 55'
PR	18	Simon Berghan	(substituted on) 55'
LK	19	Rob Harley	(substituted on) 71'
FL	20	Nick Haining	(substituted on) 65'
N8	21	Cornell du Preez	(substituted on) 38'
SH	22	George Horne	(substituted on) 65'
FH	23	Finn Russell	(substituted on) 55'
Coach:
(Scotland) Gregor Townsend

FB	15	Soso Matiashvili
RW	14	Aka Tabutsadze
OC	13	Demur Tapladze
IC	12	Merab Sharikadze (c)		(substituted off) 55'
LW	11	Alexander Todua		(substituted off) 77'
FH	10	Tedo Abzhandadze
SH	9	Vasil Lobzhanidze		(substituted off) 61'
N8	8	Beka Gorgadze
OF	7	Beka Saghinadze
BF	6	Otar Giorgadze		(substituted off) 55'
RL	5	Grigor Kerdikoshvili
LL	4	Nodar Tcheishvili		(substituted off) 71'
TP	3	Lekso Kaulashvili		(substituted off) 40'
HK	2	Jaba Bregvadze		(substituted off) 50'
LP	1	Mikheil Nariashvili		(substituted off) 55'
Replacements:
HK	16	Shalva Mamukashvili		(substituted on) 50'
PR	17	Guram Gogichashvili		(substituted on) 55'
PR	18	Giorgi Melikidze		(substituted on) 40'
LK	19	Giorgi Javakhia		(substituted on) 71'
FL	20	Giorgi Tkhilaishvili		(substituted on) 55'
SH	21	Gela Aprasidze	(yellow card) 72' to end'	(substituted on) 61'
CE	22	Giorgi Kveseladze		(substituted on) 55'
CE	23	Tamaz Mchedlidze		(substituted on) 77'
Coach:
(Georgia (country)) Levan Maisashvili

Player of the Match:
Hamish Watson (Scotland)

Assistant referees:
Mathieu Raynal (France)
Ben Whitehouse (Wales)
Television match official:
Marius Mitrea (Italy)

Notes:

- Oli Kebble and Duhan van der Merwe (both Scotland) made their international debuts.
- Finn Russell (Scotland) earned his 50th test cap.
- This was Scotland's largest winning margin over Georgia, surpassing the 34-point difference set in August 2019.

24 October 2020
21:10 CEST (UTC+02)

France	38–21	Wales
Try: Baille 13' c Dupont (2) 31' c, 34' c Ollivon 66' c Thomas 73' c Con: Ntamack (5/5) 14', 32', 35', 67', 74'; Pen: Ntamack (1/1) 48'	Report	Try: Halfpenny 1' c Smith 69' m Con: Biggar (1/2) 2'; Pen: Biggar (3/5) 7', 28', 43'

Stade de France, Saint-Denis
Attendance: 0
Referee: Karl Dickson (England)

Team details

FB	15	Anthony Bouthier	(substituted off) 40'
RW	14	Teddy Thomas
OC	13	Virimi Vakatawa	(substituted off) 71'
IC	12	Gaël Fickou
LW	11	Vincent Rattez
FH	10	Romain Ntamack
SH	9	Antoine Dupont	(substituted off) 71'
N8	8	Gregory Alldritt
OF	7	Charles Ollivon (c)
BF	6	François Cros
RL	5	Paul Willemse	(substituted off) 56'
LL	4	Bernard Le Roux
TP	3	Mohamed Haouas	(substituted off) 56'
HK	2	Julien Marchand	(substituted off) 56'
LP	1	Cyril Baille	(substituted off) 56'
Replacements:
HK	16	Camille Chat	(substituted on) 56'
PR	17	Jean-Baptiste Gros	(substituted on) 56'
PR	18	Demba Bamba	(substituted on) 56'
LK	19	Romain Taofifénua	(substituted on) 56'
FL	20	Dylan Cretin
SH	21	Baptiste Serin	(substituted on) 71'
CE	22	Arthur Vincent	(substituted on) 71'
FB	23	Thomas Ramos	(substituted on) 40'
Coach:
(France) Fabien Galthié

FB	15	Leigh Halfpenny	(substituted off) 61'
RW	14	George North
OC	13	Jonathan Davies
IC	12	Nick Tompkins
LW	11	Josh Adams
FH	10	Dan Biggar	(substituted off) 75'
SH	9	Rhys Webb	(substituted off) 55'
N8	8	Taulupe Faletau
OF	7	Justin Tipuric
BF	6	Aaron Wainwright	(substituted off) 52'
RL	5	Alun Wyn Jones (c)
LL	4	Cory Hill	(substituted off) 64'
TP	3	Samson Lee	(substituted off) 33'
HK	2	Ryan Elias	(substituted off) 56'
LP	1	Rhys Carré	(substituted off) 63'
Replacements:
HK	16	Sam Parry	(substituted on) 56'
PR	17	Nicky Smith	(substituted on) 63'
PR	18	Dillon Lewis	(substituted on) 33'
LK	19	Seb Davies	(substituted on) 64'
FL	20	James Davies	(substituted on) 52'
SH	21	Gareth Davies	(substituted on) 55'
FH	22	Rhys Patchell	(substituted on) 75'
WG	23	Louis Rees-Zammit	(substituted on) 61'
Coach:
(New Zealand) Wayne Pivac

Assistant referees:
Frank Murphy (Ireland)
Ian Tempest (England)
Television match official:
Brian MacNeice (Ireland)

Notes:

- This was the 100th meeting between the two nations.
- France recorded back-to-back victories over Wales for the first time since 2011.
- Alun Wyn Jones (Wales) equalled New Zealand's Richie McCaw's record for the most capped rugby player (148; 139 for Wales, 9 for the British and Irish Lions).
- Sam Parry and Louis Rees-Zammit (both Wales) made their international debuts.

=== 30 October – 1 November ===
30 October 2020
15:00 AEDT (UTC+11)

Australia XV	15–19	Argentina
Try: Ikitau 28' m Wright 38' m Unknown 72' m	Report	Try: Oviedo 53' c Carreras 62' c Gorrissen 65' m Con: Miotti (2/2) 55', 63'

TG Millner Field, Sydney
Attendance: 0
Referee: Nic Berry (Australia)

1 November 2020
16:00 UYT (UTC-03)

Uruguay	20–32	Spain
Try: Freitas 16' c Vilaseca 67' c Con: Favaro (2/2) 17', 68'; Pen: Favaro (2/2) 11', 73'		Try: Quercy 18' m Del Hoyo 24' c Tauli 76' c Rabago 78' c Con: Mélé (2/3) 25', 77'; Güemes (1/1) 79'; Pen: Güemes (2/2) 38', 70'

Estadio Charrúa, Montevideo
Attendance: 0
Referee: Federico Anselmi (Argentina)

Team details

FB	15	Gastón Mieres
RW	14	Federico Favaro
OC	13	Nicolás Freitas
IC	12	Andrés Vilaseca (c)
LW	11	Rodrigo Silva
FH	10	Felipe Echeverry
SH	9	Guillermo Lijtenstein
N8	8	Manuel Diana
OF	7	Santiago Civetta
BF	6	Manuel Ardao	(substituted off) 68'
RL	5	Juanjuan Garese
LL	4	Felipe Aliaga	(substituted off) 57'
TP	3	Diego Arbelo
HK	2	Facundo Gattas	(substituted off) 51'
LP	1	Matías Benítez	(substituted off) 50'
Replacements:
HK	16	Guillermo Pujadas	(substituted on) 51'
PR	17	Mateo Perillo
PR	18	Ignacio Péculo	(substituted on) 50'
LK	19	Lorenzo Surraco
FL	20	Leandro Segredo	(substituted on) 68'
FL	21	Eric Dosantos	(substituted on) 57'
SH	22	Ignacio Rodríguez
CE	23	Agustín Della Corte
Coach:
(Argentina) Esteban Meneses

FB	15	Richard Stewart		(substituted off) 63'
RW	14	Ignacio Contardi
OC	13	Andrea Rabago
IC	12	Bautista Güemes
LW	11	Julen Goia (c)		(substituted off) 61'
FH	10	David Mélé
SH	9	Kerman Aurrekoetxea		(substituted off) 47'
N8	8	Afa Tauli	(yellow card) 47' to 57'
OF	7	Fréderic Quercy
BF	6	Matthew Foulds
RL	5	Victor Sánchez Borrego		(substituted off) 54'
LL	4	Manu Mora		(substituted off) 52'
TP	3	Andrés Alvarado		(substituted off) 65'
HK	2	Vicente del Hoyo		(substituted off) 54'
LP	1	José Díaz		(substituted off) 40'
Replacements:
PR	16	Fernando Martín López		(substituted on) 40'
HK	17	Steve Barnes		(substituted on) 54'
PR	18	Joel Merkler		(substituted on) 65'
LK	19	Michael Walkter-Fitton		(substituted on) 52'
FL	20	Michael Hogg		(substituted on) 54'
SH	21	Facundo Munilla		(substituted on) 47'
CE	22	Gonzalo Vinuesa		(substituted on) 63'
FB	23	Baltazar Taibo		(substituted on) 61'
Coach:
(Spain) Santiago Santos

Assistant referees:
Damián Schneider (Argentina)
Nehuén Jauri Rivero (Argentina)

Notes:

- Felipe Aliaga, Eric Dosantos, Juanjuan Garese and Ignacio Péculo (all Uruguay) and Andrés Alvarado, Bautista Güemes and Joel Merkler (all Spain) made their international debuts.

=== 6/7 November ===
6 November 2020
19:00 UYT (UTC-03)

Uruguay	19–10	Spain
Try: Favaro 34' c Con: Favaro (1/1) 35'; Pen: Favaro (4/7) 5', 28', 64', 73'		Try: Goia 47' c Con: Mélé (1/1) 48'; Pen: Mélé (1/1) 41'

Estadio Charrúa, Montevideo
Attendance: 0
Referee: Federico Anselmi (Argentina)

Team details

FB	15	Gastón Mieres		(substituted off) 37'
RW	14	Federico Favaro
OC	13	Nicolás Freitas	(yellow card) 40' to 50'	(substituted off) 52'
IC	12	Andrés Vilaseca (c)
LW	11	Rodrigo Silva
FH	10	Felipe Echeverry
SH	9	Guillermo Lijtenstein		(substituted off) 77'
N8	8	Manuel Diana		(substituted off) 68'
OF	7	Santiago Civetta
BF	6	Manuel Ardao		(substituted off) 77'
RL	5	Juanjuan Garese
LL	4	Felipe Aliaga
TP	3	Diego Arbelo		(substituted off) 79'
HK	2	Guillermo Pujadas		(substituted off) 70'
LP	1	Matías Benítez		(substituted off) 51'
Replacements:
HK	16	Facundo Gattas		(substituted on) 51'
PR	17	Mateo Perillo		(substituted on) 79'
PR	18	Ignacio Péculo		(substituted on) 70'
FL	19	Leandro Segredo		(substituted on) 77'
FL	20	Eric Dosantos		(substituted on) 68'
FL	21	Ignacio Rodríguez		(substituted on) 77'
FB	22	José Irileguy		(substituted on) 37'
CE	23	Agustín Della Corte		(substituted on) 52'
Coach:
(Argentina) Esteban Meneses

FB	15	Richard Stewart
RW	14	Ignacio Contardi		(substituted off) 55'
OC	13	Andrea Rabago
IC	12	Bautista Güemes
LW	11	Julen Goia
FH	10	David Mélé		(substituted off) 55'
SH	9	Facundo Munilla		(substituted off) 54'
N8	8	Afa Tauli
OF	7	Fréderic Quercy		(substituted off) 67'
BF	6	Matthew Foulds	(yellow card) 40' to 50'
RL	5	Victor Sánchez Borrego	(yellow card) 38' to 48'
LL	4	Manu Mora	(yellow card) 52' to 62'	(substituted off) 62'
TP	3	Andrés Alvarado		(substituted off) 65'
HK	2	Vicente del Hoyo		(substituted off) 59'
LP	1	Fernando Martín López (c)		(substituted off) 65'
Replacements:
PR	16	Leandro Wozniak		(substituted on) 65'
HK	17	Steve Barnes		(substituted on) 59'
PR	18	Joel Merkler		(substituted on) 65'
LK	19	Michael Walkter-Fitton		(substituted on) 62'
N8	20	Oier Goia		(substituted on) 67'
SH	21	Kerman Aurrekoetxea		(substituted on) 54'
WG	22	Daniel Barranco		(substituted on) 55'
FB	23	Baltazar Taibo		(substituted on) 55'
Coach:
(Spain) Santiago Santos

Assistant referees:
Damián Schneider (Argentina)
Nehuén Jauri Rivero (Argentina)

Notes:

- José Irileguy, Mateo Perillo and Ignacio Rodríguez (all Uruguay) and Daniel Barranco and Leandro Wozniak (both Spain) made their international debut.

7 November 2020
15:00 AEDT (UTC+11)

Australia XV	24–57	Argentina
Try: Reilly 11' c Naisarani (2) 37' c, 51' c Nawaqanitawase 45' m Con: Harrison (2/4) 38', 52'		Try: Carreras 8' m Cubelli (2) 22' c, 29' c Matera 39' c Miotti 48' c Cordero (2) 59' c, 80+3' m Mallía 73' c Cancelliere 78' m Con: Sánchez (3/4) 23', 30', 40'; Miotti (3/5) 49', 60', 74'

TG Millner Field, Sydney
Attendance: 0
Referee: Reuben Keane (Australia)

=== 20/21 November ===
21 November 2020
15:00 WET (UTC+0)

Portugal	30–10	Brazil
Try: Diniz 4' m Costa 54' m Simões 65' m de Freitas 69' c Con: J.M. Lima (1/2) 70'; Pen: Portela (1/2) 26'	Report	Try: Claudio 74' c Con: Reeves (1/1) 75'; Pen: Duque (1/2) 48'

CAR Rugby do Jamor, Lisbon
Attendance: 0
Referee: Alexandru Ionescu (Romania)

Team details

FB	15	Manuel Cardoso Pinto
RW	14	Raffaele Storti
OC	13	José Lima
IC	12	Tomás Appleton (c)
LW	11	António Cortes	(substituted off) 55'
FH	10	Jerónimo Portela	(substituted off) 64'
SH	9	João Belo	(substituted off) 70'
N8	8	Thibault de Freitas
OF	7	David Wallis
BF	6	Valentin Ambrósio	(substituted off) 66'
RL	5	Rafael Simões	(substituted off) 66'
LL	4	José Madeira
TP	3	Diogo Ferreira	(substituted off) 50'
HK	2	Duarte Diniz	(substituted off) 50'
LP	1	David Costa	(substituted off) 66'
Replacements:
PR	16	Hugo Mendes	(substituted on) 66'
HK	17	Nuno Mascarenhas	(substituted on) 50'
PR	18	Bruno Rocha	(substituted on) 50'
LK	19	Duarte Torgal	(substituted on) 66'
FL	20	Manuel Picão	(substituted on) 66'
WG	21	Nuno Guedes	(substituted on) 55'
CE	22	José Lima	(substituted on) 64'
SH	23	Pedro Lucas	(substituted on) 70'
Coach:
(France) Patrice Lagisquet

FB	15	Daniel Sancery
RW	14	Robert Tenório
OC	13	Felipe Sancery (c)
IC	12	Moisés Duque
LW	11	Daniel Lima		(substituted off) 67'
FH	10	Lucas Spago		(substituted off) 59'
SH	9	Douglas Rauth		(substituted off) 70'
N8	8	André Arrud
OF	7	Matheus Claudio
BF	6	Adrio de Melo		(substituted off) 64'
RL	5	Guilherme Dias	(yellow card) 51' to 61'
LL	4	Gabriel Paganini		(substituted off) 73'
TP	3	Wilton Rebolo		(substituted off) 70'
HK	2	Endy Willia		(substituted off) 59'
LP	1	Lucas Abud		(substituted off) 64'
Replacements:
PR	16	Caíque Silva		(substituted on) 64'
HK	17	Yan Rosetti		(substituted on) 59'
PR	18	Matheus Rocha		(substituted on) 70'
LK	19	Michael Moraes		(substituted on) 73'
FL	20	Rafael Teixeira		(substituted on) 64'
SH	21	Felipe Cunha		(substituted on) 70'
FH	22	Josh Reeves		(substituted on) 59'
WG	23	Laurent Bourda-Couhet		(substituted on) 67'
Coach:
(Brazil) Fernando Portugal

Assistant referees:
Vlad Iordăchescu (Romania)
Radu Petrescu (Romania)

Notes:

- Valentin Ambrósio and Hugo Mendes (both Portugal) and Adrio de Melo Guilherme Dias, Lucas Spago and Rafael Teixeira (all Brazil) made their international debuts.

=== 27/28 November ===
28 November 2020
15:00 WET (UTC+0)

Portugal	33–13	Brazil
Try: Belo 14' c Marta 47' c Pinto 50' c Mendes 53' m Appleton 66' c Con: Abecassis (3/3) 14′, 48′, 51′ Freudenthal (1/1) 66'	Report	Try: Silva 68' c Con: Duque (1/1) 69'; Pen: Duque (1/1) 10'; Drop: Duque (1/1) 32'

CAR Rugby do Jamor, Lisbon
Attendance: 0
Referee: Federico Vedovelli (Italy)

Team details

FB	15	João Freudenthal
RW	14	Rodrigo Marta
OC	13	José Lima		(substituted off) 70'
IC	12	Tomás Appleton (c)
LW	11	Manuel Cardoso Pinto			(substituted off) 77'
FH	10	Jorge Abecassis		(substituted off) 59'
SH	9	João Belo		(substituted off) 69'
N8	8	Thibault de Freitas
OF	7	David Carvalho
BF	6	Frederico Couto		(substituted off) 59'
RL	5	Rafael Simões		(substituted off) 60'
LL	4	José Madeira
TP	3	Bruno Rocha		(substituted off) 56'
HK	2	Nuno Mascarenhas		(substituted off) 56'	(substituted on) 77'
LP	1	David Costa		(substituted off) 53'
Replacements:
PR	16	Hugo Mendes		(substituted on) 53'
HK	17	Duarte Diniz	(yellow card) 76' to 80'	(substituted on) 56'
PR	18	Diogo Ferreira		(substituted on) 56'
LK	19	Duarte Torgal		(substituted on) 60'
FL	20	Francisco Souza		(substituted on) 59'
SH	21	Duarte Azevedo		(substituted on) 69'
FH	22	Jerónimo Portela		(substituted on) 59'
CE	23	Antônio Cortes		(substituted on) 70'
Coach:
(France) Patrice Lagisquet

FB	15	Daniel Sancery		(substituted off) 75'
RW	14	Lucas Tranquez
OC	13	Felipe Sancery (c)
IC	12	Moisés Duque
LW	11	Lorenzo Massari		(substituted off) 60'
FH	10	Josh Reeves
SH	9	Felipe Gonçalves
N8	8	André Arruda
OF	7	Matheus Claudio
BF	6	Michael Moraes		(substituted off) 49'
RL	5	Guilherme Dias		(substituted off) 59'
LL	4	Gabriel Paganini	(yellow card) 78' to 80'
TP	3	Wilton Rebolo		(substituted off) 56'
HK	2	Endy Willia		(substituted off) 56'
LP	1	Lucas Abud		(substituted off) 40'
Replacements:
PR	16	Caíque Silva		(substituted on) 56'
HK	17	Yan Rosetti		(substituted on) 40'
PR	18	Matheus Rocha		(substituted on) 56'
LK	19	Gabriel Oliveira		(substituted on) 59'
FL	20	Adrio de Melo		(substituted on) 49'
SH	21	Douglas Rauth
WG	22	Daniel Lima		(substituted on) 60'
WG	23	Laurent Bourda-Couhet		(substituted on) 75'
Coach:
(Brazil) Fernando Portugal

Assistant referees:
Luca Trentin (Italy)
Fillipo Russo (Italy)

=== 5 December ===
5 December 2020
19:05 NZDT (UTC+13)

Māori All Blacks	28–21	Moana Pasifika
Try: Trask 23' c Dixon 43' c Proctor 50' c Karpik 69' c Con: Trask (4/4) 23' 43' 50' 69'		Try: Motuga 53' m Polataivao 77' c Con: Ioane (1/2) 77'; Pen: Ioane (3/3) 1', 9', 31'

Waikato Stadium, Hamilton
Referee: Mike Fraser (New Zealand)

Team details

FB	15	Kaleb Trask
RW	14	Shaun Stevenson
OC	13	Billy Proctor
IC	12	Quinn Tupaea
LW	11	Sean Wainui
FH	10	Otere Black
SH	9	Bryn Hall
N8	8	Liam Messam
OF	7	Billy Harmon
BF	6	Whetu Douglas
RL	5	Manaaki Selby-Rickit
LL	4	Isaia Walker-Leawere
TP	3	Marcel Renata
HK	2	Ash Dixon (c)
LP	1	Josh Hohneck
Replacements:
HK	16	Kurt Eklund
PR	17	Pouri Rakete-Stones
PR	18	Tamaiti Williams
FL	19	Ethan Roots
FL	20	Mitchell Karpik
SH	21	Te Toiroa Tahuriorangi
CE	22	Rameka Poihipi
WG	23	Jonah Lowe
Coach:
(New Zealand) Clayton McMillan

FB	15	(Samoa) Stephen Perofeta
RW	14	(Tonga) Leicester Fainga'anuku
OC	13	(Tonga) Fetuli Paea
IC	12	(Samoa) Vince Aso
LW	11	(Samoa) Salesi Rayasi
FH	10	(Samoa) Josh Ioane
SH	9	(Tonga) Folau Fakatava
N8	8	(Fiji) Pita Gus Sowakula
OF	7	(Samoa) Alamanda Motuga
BF	6	(Samoa) Marino Mikaele-Tu'u
RL	5	(Samoa) Naitoa Ah Kuoi
LL	4	(Samoa) Gerard Cowley-Tuioti
TP	3	(Samoa) Michael Alaalatoa (c)
HK	2	(Tuvalu) Leni Apisai
LP	1	(Samoa) Daniel Lienert-Brown
Replacements:
HK	16	(Tonga) Samisoni Taukei'aho
PR	17	(Samoa) Jordan Lay
PR	18	(Tonga) Sione Mafileo
LK	19	(Tonga) Samipeni Fianu
N8	20	(Tonga) Nasi Manu
SH	21	(Samoa) Dwayne Polataivao
WG	22	(Fiji) Asaeli Tikoirotuma
FB	23	(Samoa) Etene Nanai-Seturo
Coach:
(New Zealand) Tana Umaga

Assistant referees:
Brendon Pickerill (New Zealand)
Daniel Waenga (New Zealand)
Television match official:
Lee Jeffrey (New Zealand)

== Cancelled fixtures ==
Cancelled fixtures
The below fixtures were cancelled during the new extended November International window

25 October 2020 (Note: Postponed from 21 June 2020.)

England	v (Note: Cancelled on 23 October due to a breach of COVID-19 code of conduct by players in the Barbarians squad.)	Barbarians

Twickenham Stadium, London

25 October 2020

Russia	v (Note: Cancelled on 19 October after a number of players tested positive for coronavirus.)	Romania

VTB Arena, Moscow

6 November 2020

Portugal	v (Note: Cancelled mid-October due to restrictions imposed by French local government.)	Fiji

Stade Municipal de Beaublanc, Limoges, France

7 November 2020

Romania	v (Note: Cancelled in October due to various issues regarding coronavirus situation in Europe.)	Russia

Bucharest

The below games were the originally scheduled games as per the World Rugby calendar pre-COVID 19 outbreak, and cancelled due to various global restrictions

30 October 2020

Canada	v	United States

BC Place, Vancouver

31 October 2020

Japan	v	New Zealand

Japan National Stadium, Tokyo

31 October 2020

Fiji	v	New Zealand XV

BC Place, Vancouver, Canada

7 November 2020

Romania	v	Uruguay

Not announced

7 November 2020

Scotland	v	Argentina

Murrayfield Stadium, Edinburgh

7 November 2020

England	v	New Zealand

Twickenham Stadium, London

7 November 2020

Ireland	v	Australia

Aviva Stadium, Dublin

7 November 2020

Italy	v	South Africa

Not announced

7 November 2020

France	v	Georgia

Stade Geoffroy Guichard, Saint-Étienne

7 November 2020

Wales	v	Fiji

Millennium Stadium, Cardiff

10 November 2020

Colombia	v	(New Zealand) Māori All Blacks

Estadio El Campin, Bogotá

14 November 2020

England	v	Argentina

Twickenham Stadium, London

14 November 2020

Scotland	v	Japan

Murrayfield Stadium, Edinburgh

14 November 2020

Ireland	v	South Africa

Aviva Stadium, Dublin

14 November 2020

France	v	Australia

Stade de France, Saint-Denis

14 November 2020

Italy	v	Uruguay

Not announced

14 November 2020

Wales	v	New Zealand

Millennium Stadium, Cardiff

21 November 2020

England	v	Tonga

Twickenham Stadium, London

21 November 2020

Samoa	v	Uruguay

In Europe

21 November 2020

Scotland	v	New Zealand

Murrayfield Stadium, Edinburgh

21 November 2020

Ireland	v	Japan

Aviva Stadium, Dublin

21 November 2020

France	v	South Africa

Stade de France, Saint-Denis

21 November 2020

Georgia	v	Fiji

Tbilisi

21 November 2020

Italy	v	Australia

Not announced

22 November 2020

Wales	v	Argentina

Millennium Stadium, Cardiff

28 November 2020

England	v	Australia

Twickenham Stadium, London

28 November 2020

Wales	v	South Africa

Millennium Stadium, Cardiff

5 December 2020

Barbarians	v	Japan

Twickenham Stadium, London

== See also ==
- 2020 July rugby union tests
- 2020 South American Rugby Championship
- 2020 Rugby Championship
- Autumn Nations Cup
- 2020 Rugby Europe Championship
- 2020 Six Nations Championship
