= 2021 Súper Liga Americana de Rugby season =

2021 Súper Liga Americana de Rugby
- Countries: Argentina; Brazil; Chile; Paraguay; Uruguay; Colombia
- Date: 16 March – 15 May
- Champions: (Argentina) Jaguares XV (1st title)
- Runners-up: (Uruguay) Peñarol
- Matches played: 32

Official website
- www.slar.rugby/torneo-11

The 2021 Súper Liga Americana de Rugby season was the second season of Súper Liga Americana de Rugby, an annual rugby union competition sanctioned by Sudamérica Rugby. The competition began on 16 March and ended on 15 May.

== Teams ==
Location of teams of the 2021 Superliga Americana de Rugby.

Team	City	Stadium	Capacity	Coach	Captain
(Argentina) Jaguares XV	Buenos Aires	TBC	TBC	(Argentina) Ignacio Fernández Lobbe	(Argentina) Felipe Ezcurra
(Brazil) Cobras	São Paulo	TBA	TBA	(Argentina) Emiliano Bergamaschi	(Brazil) Felipe Sancery
(Chile) Selknam	Santiago	Estadio Nacional	40,000	(Argentina) Nicolás Bruzzone	(Chile) Ignacio Silva
(Colombia) Cafeteros Pro	Medellín	TBA	TBA	(Argentina) Rodolfo Ambrosio	(Colombia) Jhon C. Álvarez
(Paraguay) Olímpia Lions	Asunción	Estadio Héroes de Curupayty	3,000	(Argentina) Raúl Pérez	(Argentina) Axel Zapata
(Uruguay) Peñarol	Montevideo	Estadio Charrúa	14,000	(Argentina) Pablo Bouza	(Uruguay) Andrés Vilaseca

== Team changes ==
Ceibos did not compete in the 2021 edition of the competition, having been replaced by the Argentine Rugby Union with the Jaguares XV. The Brazilian side are now known as Cobras Brasil XV or Cobras following the end of relationship with the Corinthians multi-sport club. The Colombian Cafeteros Pro also debuted this year. They were meant to debut in the 2020 season before it was cancelled due to the COVID-19 pandemic.

== Season format ==
The six clubs in the competition competed in the regular season, which took place over 10 weeks and consisted of a double round-robin, with each participating club playing two matches against each of the other five clubs. The top 4 clubs at the end of the regular season moved on to the championship playoffs.

The championship was contested between the top four regular season clubs in a knockout tournament.

== Venues ==
Due to the COVID-19 pandemic the 2021 season was held in Chile and Uruguay only. The first half of the regular season was held at Estadio Municipal de La Pintana in Santiago and Estadio Elías Figueroa Brander in Valparaíso. The second half of the regular season and the playoffs of the competition was held at Estadio Charrúa in Montevideo.

== Regular season ==
The regular season began on 16 March and ended on 1 May.

=== Standings ===
Season Standings
Pos	Team	Pld	W	D	L	PF	PA	PD	TF	TA	TB	LB	Pts	Qualification
1	(Argentina) Jaguares XV	10	10	0	0	571	137	+434	81	16	10	0	50	Championship Playoffs
2	(Uruguay) Peñarol	10	7	0	3	279	210	+69	32	26	3	0	31	Championship Playoffs
3	(Chile) Selknam	10	5	0	5	278	270	+8	37	30	3	3	26	Championship Playoffs
4	(Paraguay) Olímpia Lions	10	5	0	5	253	324	−71	26	41	3	0	23	Championship Playoffs
5	(Brazil) Cobras	10	3	0	7	154	332	−178	20	43	1	1	14	
6	(Colombia) Cafeteros Pro	10	0	0	10	167	429	−262	21	62	3	2	5	

Updated to match(es) played on 1 May 2021. Source:

=== Matches ===
The following are the match results for the 2021 Super Liga Americana de Rugby regular season:

Home \ Away	CAF	COB	JAG	OLI	PEN	SEL
(Colombia) Cafeteros Pro		14–22	7–80	33–51	13–14	11–42
(Brazil) Cobras	30–14		12–62	8–44	24–33	21–20
(Argentina) Jaguares XV	71–28	20–0		40–26	46–17	68–8
(Paraguay) Olímpia Lions	39–32	19–15	13–77		10–29	16–29
(Uruguay) Peñarol	45–3	40–12	18–42	40–11		26–22
(Chile) Selknam	35–12	66–10	8–65	21–24	27–17	

Updated to match(es) played on 1 May 2021. Source:
Legend: Blue = home team win; Yellow = draw; Red = away team win.

==== Week 1 ====
16 Mar	(1 BP) Peñarol (Uruguay)	40–11	(Paraguay) Olímpia Lions	Estadio Municipal de La Pintana
16:30 UTC−03:00	Try: C. Roura 20'; G. Pujadas 40'; M. Nogués 78'; S. Álvarez 80'; Con: M. Roger (4) 20', 40', 78', 80'; Pen: M. Roger (4) 15', 25', 35', 50'	Report	Try: J. González 2'; Pen: S. Urbieta (2) 23', 31'	Referee: Federico Anselmi (UAR)

16 Mar	(1 BP) Selknam (Chile)	35–12	(Colombia) Cafeteros Pro	Estadio Municipal de La Pintana
20:00 UTC−03:00	Try: M. Garafulic (4) 2', 11', 15', 58'; J.I. Larenas 69'; M. Dittus 76'; Con: S. Videla 15'; Pen: S. Videla 27'; Cards: M. Dittus (yellow card) 52'; C. Saavedra (yellow card) 52'	Report	Try: F. Pueyrredón 24'; J.A. Urrutia 79'; Con: N. Roger 24'	Referee: Damián Schneider (UAR)

16 Mar	(1 BP) Jaguares XV (Argentina)	Cancelled; 20–0	(Brazil) Cobras	Estadio Municipal de La Pintana
N/A		Report

==== Week 2 ====
21 Mar	(1 BP) Cobras (Brazil)	24–33	(Uruguay) Peñarol	Estadio Municipal de La Pintana
13:00 UTC−03:00	Try: L. Bourda-Couhet 10'; M. Bernstein 38'; M. Duque 75'; A. Arruda 80'; Con: M. Duque (2) 38', 80'; Cards: Y. Rosetti (yellow card) 26'	Report	Try: F. Arcos Pérez 5′ F. Gattas 40'; M. Viñales 66'; Con: M. Roger (2) 5', 40'; N. Freitas 67'; Pen: M. Roger (4) 14', 26', 49', 57'

21 Mar	Olímpia Lions (Paraguay)	16–29	(Chile) Selknam	Estadio Municipal de La Pintana
16:30 UTC−03:00	Try: J. Pellandini 72'; Con: M. Ledesma 72'; Pen: M. Ledesma (3) 14', 22', 51'; Cards: L. Favre (yellow card) 37'; F. Bullentini (yellow card) 68'	Report	Try: A. Böhme 27'; T. Dussaillant 45'; M. Filizzola 80'; Con: P. Baronio 28'; Pen: P. Baronio (3) 40', 55', 63'; M. Filizzola 69'; Cards: A. Böhme (yellow card) 35'; I. Silva (yellow card) 51'

21 Mar	(1 BP) Jaguares XV (Argentina)	71–28	(Colombia) Cafeteros Pro (1 BP)	Estadio Municipal de La Pintana
20:00 UTC−03:00	Try: J. Oviedo 2'; M. Vaca 14'; J.M. González 16'; S. Chocobares 18'; S. Cancelliere (2) 23', 57'; T. Cubilla (2) 33', 67'; F. Ezcurra 39'; J.B. Daireaux 45'; F. Gutiérrez 61'; Con: M. Elías (6/8) 3', 15', 17', 19', 24', 40'; G. Prisciantelli (2/3) 62', 68'; Cards: F. Wegrzyn (yellow card) 78'	Report	Try: A. Navarro (2) 36', 41'; D. Posada 72'; G. García 80'; Con: N. Roger (4/4) 37', 42', 73', 80'	Referee: Federico Anselmi (UAR)

==== Week 3 ====
25 Mar	(1 BP) Peñarol (Uruguay)	45–3	(Colombia) Cafeteros Pro	Estadio Elías Figueroa Brander
13:00 UTC−03:00	Try: T. Inciarte 5'; M. Ardao 11'; M. Benítez 21'; F. Gattas 60'; M. Viñals (2) 73', 80'; M. Nogués 77'; Con: M. Roger (3/3) 5', 12', 22'; F. Favaro (2/4) 74', 78'; Cards: E. Dosantos (yellow card) 54'	Report	Pen: N. Roger 5'; Cards: Pérez (yellow card) 68'	Referee: Damian Schneider (UAR)

25 Mar	Cobras (Brazil)	8–44	(Paraguay) Olímpia Lions (1 BP)	Estadio Elías Figueroa Brander
16:30 UTC−03:00	Try: A. Arruda 40'; Pen: M. Duque 26'; Cards: A. Arruda (yellow card) 50'; A. de Melo (yellow card) 69'	Report	Try: M. Bogado 5'; I. Gandini 14'; L. Santa Cruz 18'; L. Herrera 53'; R. Cardona (2) 60', 76'; I. Inchauspe 73'; Con: S. Urbieta (2) 6', 15'; M. Ledesma 74'; Pen: S. Urbieta 30'	Referee: Tomás Bertazza (UAR)

25 Mar	Selknam (Chile)	8–65	(Argentina) Jaguares XV (1 BP)	Estadio Elías Figueroa Brander
20:00 UTC−03:00	Try: M. Filizzola 53'; Pen: S. Videla 23'; Cards: J.I. Larenas (yellow card) 38'	Report	Try: M. Vaca 5'; S. Cancelliere (2) 18', 78'; J.P. Castro 26'; J.M. González 30'; J. Oviedo 38'; Penalty try 40'; B. Salese 66'; L. Bavaro 70'; Con: M. Elías (3) 19', 27', 39'; G. Prisciantelli (3) 67', 71', 79'; Pen: M. Elías (2) 11', 36'	Referee: Francisco González (URU)

==== Week 4 ====
30 Mar	Cobras (Brazil)	30–14	(Colombia) Cafeteros Pro	Estadio Elías Figueroa Brander
13:00 UTC−03:00	Try: L. Tranquez 38'; A. Arruda 49'; F. Giudice 76'; Con: J. Reeves 39'; M. Duque 50', 77'; Pen: J. Reeves 10'; M. Duque 70'; Drop: M. Duque 4'; Cards: M. De Sanctis (yellow card) 51'	Report	Try: Penalty try 46'; F. Ferrario 80'; Con: G. García 80'; Cards: C. Rodallegas (yellow card) 67'	Referee: Frank Méndez (FRC)

30 Mar	Peñarol (Uruguay)	26–22	(Chile) Selknam (1 BP)	Estadio Elías Figueroa Brander
16:30 UTC−03:00	Try: M. Ardao (2) 4', 72'; Con: M. Roger (2) 5', 73'; Pen: M. Roger (4) 13', 30', 56', 67'; Cards: J. Echeverría (yellow card) 31'	Report	Try: M. Garafulic 10'; N. Garafulic 60'; R. Martínez 78'; Con: P. Baronio (2) 61', 79'; Pen: P. Baronio 64'; Cards: C. Saavedra (yellow card) 35'; M. Dittus (yellow card) 55'

30 Mar	Olímpia Lions (Paraguay)	13–77	(Argentina) Jaguares XV (1 BP)	Estadio Elías Figueroa Brander
20:00 UTC−03:00	Try: E. Quinteros 11'; Con: M. Ledesma 12'; Pen: M. Ledesma (2) 16', 40'; Cards: J. González (yellow card) 29'; I. Gandini (red card) 51'	Report	Try: M. Cancelliere (3) 30', 60', 73'; J.B. Daireaux 33'; L. Bavaro 40'; M. Vaca 41'; J.M. González 51'; T. Albornoz (2) 54', 66'; T. Bernasconi 77'; T. Cubilla 80'; Con: T. Albornoz (11) 31', 34', 40', 42', 52', 55', 61', 66', 74', 78', 80'; Cards: L. Bavaro (yellow card) 21'

==== Week 5 ====
4 Apr	(1 BP) Olímpia Lions (Paraguay)	39–32	(Colombia) Cafeteros Pro (2 BP)	Estadio Elías Figueroa Brander
13:00 UTC−04:00	Try: R. Cardona 8'; A. Zapata 12'; R. Martínez 29'; J. Gómez Vara 43'; L. Santa Cruz 66'; Con: M. Ledesma (4) 9', 13', 30', 44'; Pen: M. Ledesma (2) 37', 80'; Cards: M. Rebussone (yellow card); R. Martínez (yellow card)	Report	Try: B. Pérez 19'; C. Rodallegas 21'; J. Arley Urrutia 38'; T. García 60'; Con: N. Roger (3) 20', 22', 61'; Pen: N. Roger (2) 2', 70'; Cards: F. Ferrario (yellow card); Ortiz (yellow card)	Referee: Cauã Ricardo (CBRu)

4 Apr	(1 BP) Selknam (Chile)	66–10	(Brazil) Cobras	Estadio Elías Figueroa Brander
16:30 UTC−04:00	Try: I. Albornoz (2) 6', 80'; P. Baronio (2) 14', 45'; S. Portillo 17'; L. Avelli 26'; D. Saavedra 33'; C. Saavedra 36'; R. Fernández 67'; B. Stavile 73'; Con: S. Videla (8) 7', 28', 34', 38', 45', 68', 74', 81'	Report	Try: F. Giudice 64'; Con: M. Duque 65'; Pen: J. Reeves 13'	Referee: Esteban Filipanics (UAR)

4 Apr	(1 BP) Jaguares XV (Argentina)	46–17	(Uruguay) Peñarol	Estadio Elías Figueroa Brander
16:30 UTC−04:00	Try: M. Cancelliere 12'; J.P. Castro 22'; J.P. Zeiss 33'; J.M. González (2) 40', 62'; S. Cancelliere 55'; Con: M. Elías (4) 13', 23', 35', 40'; T. Albornoz 63'; Pen: M. Elías (2) 10', 19'; Cards: F. Gorrissen (red card) 36'	Report	Try: E. Dosantos 29'; N. Freitas 79'; Con: M. Roger 31'; F. Favaro 80'; Pen: M. Roger 16'	Referee: Felipe Balbontin (FRC)

==== Week 6 ====
11 Apr	Olímpia Lions (Paraguay)	10–29	(Uruguay) Peñarol	Estadio Charrúa
15:00 UTC−03:00	Try: J. Gómez Vara 59'; Con: M. Ledesma 60'; Pen: S. Urbieta 18'	Report	Try: F. Gattas 28'; E. Dosantos 68'; Con: M. Roger (2) 29', 69'; Pen: M. Roger (5) 7', 11', 39', 54', 80'; Cards: N. Milan (yellow card) 44'	Referee: Tomás Bertazza (UAR)

11 Apr	Cafeteros Pro (Colombia)	11–42	(Chile) Selknam (1 BP)	Estadio Charrúa
18:00 UTC−03:00	Try: C. Rodallegas 67'; Pen: G. García (2) 6', 13'	Report	Try: J. Blanc 9'; I. Albornoz 17'; N. Garafulic 40'; D. Saavedra 43'; A. Escobar (2) 71', 80'; Con: S. Videla (4) 10', 18', 40', 44'; I. Albornoz (2) 71', 80'	Referee: Esteban Filipanics (UAR)

11 Apr	Cobras (Brazil)	12–62	(Argentina) Jaguares XV (1 BP)	Estadio Charrúa
21:00 UTC−03:00	Try: A. de Melo 4'; S. Grippo 63'; Con: M. Duque (1/2) 64'	Report	Try: J.P. Zeiss 9'; G. Prisciantelli 22'; T. Bernasconi (2) 30', 80'; B. Salese 35'; M. Cancelliere 39'; J.M. González 41'; A. Segura (2) 46', 71'; F. Ezcurra 58'; Con: T. Albornoz (6/10) 9', 31', 36', 40', 42', 80'; Cards: R. Iriarte (yellow card) 66'	Referee: Frank Méndez (FRC)

==== Week 7 ====
16 Apr	(1 BP) Peñarol (Uruguay)	40–12	(Brazil) Cobras	Estadio Charrúa
15:00 UTC−03:00	Try: G. Pujadas 9'; J.M. Alonso 12'; N. Freitas 33'; F. Gattas (2) 57', 77'; Penalty try 80'; Con: M. Roger (4) 10', 12', 34', 57'; Cards: D. Arbelo (yellow card) 51'	Report	Try: M. Claudio 26'; M. Rocha 66'; Con: M. Duque 67'; Cards: C. Silva (yellow card) 32'	Referee: Esteban Filipanics (UAR)

16 Apr	(1 BP) Selknam (Chile)	21–24	(Paraguay) Olímpia Lions	Estadio Charrúa
18:00 UTC−03:00	Try: P. Baronio 44'; D. Saavedra 48'; R. Martínez 75'; Con: S. Videla (3) 45', 49', 76'; Cards: M. Filizzola (yellow card) 28'; S. Portillo (yellow card) 69'	Report	Pen: M. Ledesma (8) 3', 14', 19', 25', 53', 56', 66', 79'	Referee: Tomás Bertazza (UAR)

16 Apr	Cafeteros Pro (Colombia)	7–80	(Argentina) Jaguares XV (1 BP)	Estadio Charrúa
21:00 UTC−03:00	Try: E. Ocampo 68'; Con: N. Roger 69'	Report	Try: T. Castiglioni (2) 10', 17'; S. Cancelliere (4) 14', 19', 28', 57'; J. Oviedo 27'; F. Molina 40'; I. Ruiz 42'; R. Iriarte 46'; M. Elías 69'; T. Albornoz 78'; Con: M. Elías (10) 11', 17', 19', 28', 40', 43', 46', 57', 70', 78'	Referee: Cauã Ricardo (CBRu)

==== Week 8 ====
21 Apr	Olímpia Lions (Paraguay)	19–15	(Brazil) Cobras (1 BP)	Estadio Charrúa
15:00 UTC−03:00	Try: R. Martínez 3'; Con: M. Ledesma 3'; Pen: M. Ledesma (4) 10', 35', 50', 72'	Report	Try: F. Cunha 30'; F. Sancery 45'; Con: M. Duque 30'; Pen: M. Duque 50'	Referee: Francisco González (UAR)

21 Apr	(1 BP) Jaguares XV (Argentina)	68–8	(Chile) Selknam	Estadio Charrúa
18:00 UTC−03:00	Try: A. Segura 6'; S. Cancelliere (5) 12', 36', 44', 59', 61'; F. Minervino 16'; J.P. Castro 44'; J. Oviedo 50'; T. Cubilla 73'; Con: T. Albornoz (8) 7', 13', 17', 37', 40', 45', 51', 60'; M. Elías 74'; Cards: F. Ezcurra (yellow card) 22'	Report	Try: I. Silva 78'; Pen: P. Baronio 5'; Cards: D. Saavedra (yellow card) 40'; P. Baronio (yellow card) 40'	Referee: Nehuen Jauri Rivero (UAR)

21 Apr	(1 BP) Cafeteros Pro (Colombia)	13–14	(Uruguay) Peñarol	Estadio Charrúa
21:00 UTC−03:00	Try: E. Ocampo 72'; Con: G. García 73'; Pen: N. Roger 34'; G. García 39'; Cards: L. Simes (yellow card) 55'; García (yellow card) 74'	Report	Try: F. Favaro 10'; T. Inciarte 43'; Con: F. Favaro (2) 10', 44'; Cards: N. Milan (yellow card) 49'	Referee: Damián Schneider (UAR)

==== Week 9 ====
26 Apr	Cafeteros Pro (Colombia)	14–22	(Brazil) Cobras	Estadio Charrúa
15:00 UTC−03:00	Try: F. Ferrario 42'; J. Corvalán 71'; Con: N. Roger 43'; T. García 72'; Cards: G. Ortiz (yellow card) 5'; L. Simes (yellow card) 32'	Report	Try: D. Sancery 9'; Y. Rossetti 20'; A. Arruda 39'; Con: J. Reeves 10'; F. Giudice 40'; Pen: M. Duque 80'	Referee: Nehuén Jauri Rivero (UAR)

26 Apr	Selknam (Chile)	27–17	(Uruguay) Peñarol	Estadio Charrúa
18:00 UTC−03:00	Try: M. Dittus 7'; J.I. Larenas 80'; Con: S. Videla 7'; Pen: S. Videla (5) 23', 36', 41', 54', 63'; Cards: C. Saavedra (yellow card) 14'; S. Portillo (yellow card) 66'; F. Velarde (red card) 73'	Report	Try: G. Pujadas 70'; C. Roura 79'; Con: M. Roger (2) 71', 79'; Pen: M. Roger 14'	Referee: Damian Schneider (UAR)

26 Apr	(1 BP) Jaguares XV (Argentina)	40–26	(Paraguay) Olímpia Lions	Estadio Charrúa
21:00 UTC−03:00	Try: I. Ruiz (2) 5', 14'; J.M. González 26'; T. Castiglioni 33'; J. Oviedo 55'; A. Segura 60'; Con: M. Elías (5) 15', 27', 33', 55', 60'	Report	Try: M. Rebussone 39'; I. Gandini 67'; Con: M. Ledesma 40'; M. Matiauda 68'; Pen: M. Ledesma (4) 3', 19', 31', 51'	Referee: Francisco González (FRC)

==== Week 10 ====
1 May	(1 BP) Cafeteros Pro (Colombia)	33–51	(Paraguay) Olímpia Lions (1 BP)	Estadio Charrúa
15:00 UTC−03:00	Try: J.D. Herrera 37'; E. Ocampo 46'; F. Puertas 57'; S. Resino 70'; G. García 75'; Con: A. Álvarez (4) 39', 47', 58', 76'	Report	Try: M. Riquelme 15'; J. González 24'; I. Gandini 33'; M. Muntaner 42'; F. Díez 62'; M. Bogado 65'; M. Garcete 78'; Con: M. Ledesma (3) 15', 25', 34'; S. Urbieta (2) 66', 78'; Pen: M. Ledesma (2) 3', 10'	Referee: Damian Schneider (UAR)

1 May	Peñarol (Uruguay)	18–42	(Argentina) Jaguares XV (1 BP)	Estadio Charrúa
18:00 UTC−03:00	Try: M. Viñals 7'; G. Pujadas 21'; Con: M. Roger 21'; Pen: M. Roger (2) 37', 42'; Cards: M. Roger (yellow card) 51'	Report	Try: F. Gorrissen 2'; T. Cubilla (2) 12', 64'; F. Ezcurra 25'; M. Vaca 52'; T. Albornoz 59'; Con: T. Albornoz (5) 2', 13', 25', 53', 59'; J.B. Daireaux 65'	Referee: Nahuén Jauri Rivero (UAR)

1 May	Cobras (Brazil)	21–20	(Chile) Selknam (1 BP)	Estadio Charrúa
21:00 UTC−03:00	Try: M. Claudio 25'; Y. Rosetti 40'; Con: M. Duque 40'; Pen: M. Duque (2) 10', 80'; Drop: M. Duque 38'	Report	Try: T. Dussaillant 56'; A. Böhme 76'; Con: S. Videla 57'; P. Baronio 77'; Pen: S. Videla (2) 2', 36'	Referee: Francisco González (URU)

== Championship Playoffs ==
Semi-finals
8 May – Montevideo
(Argentina) Jaguares XV	29
(Paraguay) Olímpia Lions	17
8 May – Montevideo
(Uruguay) Peñarol	17
(Chile) Selknam	14

Final
15 May – Montevideo
(Argentina) Jaguares XV	36
(Uruguay) Peñarol	28

=== Semifinals ===
8 May	Peñarol (Uruguay)	17–14	(Chile) Selknam	Estadio Charrúa
18:00 UTC−03:00	Try: Conrado Roura 15'; Tomás Inciarte 30'; Con: Martín Roger (2) 15', 31'; Pen: Martín Roger 8'; Cards: Federico Favaro (red card) 69'	Report	Try: Matías Dittus 51'; Santiago Portillo 64'; Con: Santiago Videla (2) 52', 64'	Referee: Damian Schneider (UAR)

8 May	Jaguares XV (Argentina)	29–17	(Paraguay) Olímpia Lions	Estadio Charrúa
21:00 UTC−03:00	Try: Francisco Minervino 17'; Lautaro Bavaro (2) 43', 67'; Tomás Albornoz 46'; Con: Tomás Albornoz (3) 17', 43', 46'; Pen: Tomás Albornoz 54'	Report	Try: Jerónimo Gómez Vara 63'; Carlos Repetto 75'; Con: Máximo Ledesma (2) 63', 75'; Pen: Máximo Ledesma 8'

=== Final ===
15 May	Jaguares XV (Argentina)	36–28	(Uruguay) Peñarol	Estadio Charrúa
20:00 UTC−03:00	Try: Tomás Cubilla (3) 23', 50', 79'; Juan Bautista Daireaux 31'; Agustín Segura 53'; Penalty try 71'; Con: Tomás Albornoz (2) 32', 79'	Report	Try: Balatazar Amaya 54'; Andrés Vilaseca 63'; Facundo Gattas 80'; Con: Martín Roger (2) 55', 64'; Pen: Martín Roger (3) 20', 42', 75'; Cards: Facundo Pomponio (yellow card) 69'	Referee: Damián Schneider (UAR)

Team details

Jaguares	Peñarol

FB	15	Juan B. Daireaux
RW	14	Sebastián Cancelliere
OC	13	Agustín Segura
IC	12	Juan Pablo Castro
LW	11	Tomás Cubilla
FH	10	Tomás Albornoz
SH	9	Felipe Ezcurra
N8	8	Francisco Gorrissen
OF	7	Juan Martín González
BF	6	Lautaro Bavaro
LL	5	Franco Molina
RL	4	Federico Gutiérrez
TP	3	Juan Pablo Zeiss
HK	2	Martín Vaca
LP	1	Federico Wegrzyn
Substitutes:
	16	Ignacio Ruiz
	17	Francisco Minervino
	18	Joel Sclavi
	19	Tomás Bernasconi
	20	Joaquín Oviedo
	21	Teo Castiglioni
	22	Martín Elías
	23	Gerónimo Prisciantelli
Coach:
(Argentina) Ignacio Fernández Lobbe

FB	15	Baltazar Amaya
RW	14	Juan Manuel Alonso
OC	13	Tomás Inciarte
IC	12	Andrés Vilaseca
LW	11	Nicolás Freitas
FH	10	Martín Roger
SH	9	Manuel Nogues
N8	8	Conrado Roura
OF	7	Santiago Civetta
BF	6	Manuel Ardao
LL	5	Nahuel Milan
RL	4	Felipe Aliaga
TP	3	Diego Arbelo
HK	2	Guillermo Pujadas
LP	1	Juan Echeverría
Substitutes:
	16	Facundo Gattas
	17	Facundo Pomponio
	18	Matías Benítez
	19	Eric Dosantos
	20	Juan Marcos Chamyan
	21	Carlos Deus
	22	Felipe Arcos
	23	José M. Iruleguy
Coach:
(Uruguay) Pablo Bouza

== Player statistics ==
=== Top scorers ===
The top try and point scorers during the 2021 Súper Liga Americana de Rugby season are:

Last updated Oct 6, 2021

Most points
No	Player	Team	Pts
1	(Argentina) Martín Roger Farias	(Uruguay) Peñarol Rugby	125
2	(Argentina) Máximo Ledesma	(Paraguay) Olímpia Lions	108
3	(Argentina) Tomás Albornoz	(Argentina) Jaguares XV	100
4	(Argentina) Martín Elías	(Argentina) Jaguares XV	75
5	(Argentina) Sebastián Cancelliere	(Argentina) Jaguares XV	70
6	(Chile) Santiago Videla	(Chile) Selknam	67
7	(Brazil) Moisés Rodrigues Duque	(Brazil) Cobras Brasil XV	47
8	(Argentina) Tomás Cubilla	(Argentina) Jaguares XV	45
9	(Argentina) Patricio Baronio	(Chile) Selknam	38
10	(Argentina) Juan Martin González Samso	(Argentina) Jaguares XV	35
11	(Argentina) Nicolás Roger Farias	(Colombia) Cafeteros Pro	32
12	(Uruguay) Facundo Gattas	(Uruguay) Peñarol Rugby	30

== Awards ==
MVP of the Tournament

Player	Team
(Argentina) Sebastián Cancelliere	(Argentina) Jaguares XV

All-SLAR First Team

Player	Position	Team
(Argentina) Rodrigo Martínez	Loosehead Prop	Olímpia Lions
(Argentina) Martín Vaca	Hooker	Jaguares XV
(Uruguay) Diego Arbelo	Tighthead Prop	Peñarol Rugby
(Argentina) Santiago Portillo	Left Lock	Selknam
(Argentina) Franco Molina	Right Lock	Jaguares XV
(Uruguay) Maneul Ardao	Blindside Flanker	Peñarol Rugby
(Argentina) Francisco Gorrissen	Openside Flanker	Jaguares XV
(Brazil) André Arruda	No8	Cobras Brasil XV
(Argentina) Gonzalo García	Scrum-half	Cafeteros Pro
(Argentina) Tomás Albornoz	Fly-half	Jaguares XV
(Uruguay) Nicolás Freitas	Blindside Wing	Peñarol Rugby
(Argentina) Juan Pablo Castro	Inside Center	Jaguares XV
(Chile) Domingo Saavedra	Outside Center	Selknam
(Argentina) Sebastián Cancelliere	Openside Wing	Jaguares XV
(Paraguay) Martín Bogado	Fullback	Olímpia Lions
