= 2019 Super Rugby final =

Men's rugby union club competition

2019 Super Rugby Final
- Event: 2019 Super Rugby season
| Crusaders | Jaguares |
| (New Zealand) | (Argentina) |
| 19 | 3 |
- Date: 6 July 2019
- Venue: Rugby League Park, Christchurch
- Referee: Jaco Peyper (South Africa)
- Attendance: c. 18,000

The 2019 Super Rugby Final was played between the Crusaders of New Zealand and the Jaguares of Argentina. It was the 24th final in the Super Rugby competition's history. The Crusaders had qualified in first place on the regular season standings, while the Jaguares had qualified in second place. Both teams hosted quarter-final and semi-final matches.

The final was won by the Crusaders who beat the Jaguares by sixteen points. The Crusaders stretched their record number of Super Rugby wins to ten and completed what is called a three-peat by winning the tournament three times consecutively in what was the competition's lowest scoring final.

== Road to the final ==
Finals Series qualifying teams
Conference leaders
| Pos | Team | W | D | L | PD | BP | Pts |
|---|---|---|---|---|---|---|---|
| 1 | (New Zealand) Crusaders | 11 | 3 | 2 | 240 | 8 | 58 |
| 2 | (Argentina) Jaguares | 11 | 0 | 5 | 109 | 7 | 51 |
| 3 | (Australia) Brumbies | 10 | 0 | 6 | 64 | 8 | 48 |
Wildcard teams
| 4 | (New Zealand) Hurricanes | 12 | 1 | 3 | 87 | 3 | 53 |
| 5 | (South Africa) Bulls | 8 | 2 | 6 | 41 | 5 | 41 |
| 6 | (South Africa) Sharks | 7 | 1 | 8 | 8 | 7 | 37 |
| 7 | (New Zealand) Chiefs | 7 | 2 | 7 | -14 | 4 | 36 |
| 8 | (New Zealand) Highlanders | 6 | 3 | 7 | 49 | 6 | 36 |

The 2019 season was a 15-team competition, consisting of three geographical conferences. Each conference leader at the end of the regular season, the Crusaders from New Zealand, Jaguares from Argentina and Brumbies from Australia gained home berths in the quarterfinals, as did the top-ranked wildcard team, the Hurricanes from New Zealand's conference. Their four wildcard opponents in the quarterfinals were the next best teams as ranked at the end of the regular season.

In the quarter-finals the Crusaders beat fellow New Zealand team the Highlanders while the Jaguares beat the Chiefs. For the semi-finals it was the Crusaders defeating the Hurricanes in Christchurch and the Jaguares defeating the Brumbies in Buenos Aires. Because of being the higher placed team in the regular season log standings, the final was held in Christchurch.

Quarter-finals
21 June – Christchurch
(New Zealand) Crusaders | 38
(New Zealand) Highlanders | 14
21 June – Buenos Aires
(Argentina) Jaguares | 21
(New Zealand) Chiefs | 16

Semi-finals
29 June – Christchurch
(New Zealand) Crusaders | 30
(New Zealand) Hurricanes | 26
28 June – Buenos Aires
(Argentina) Jaguares | 39
ACT Brumbies | 7

== Final ==
=== Details ===
6 July 2019
19:35 NZST (UTC+12)

| Crusaders | 19–3 | Jaguares |
| Try: Taylor 25' c Con: Mo'unga (1/1) 26'; Pen: Mo'unga (4/4) 40', 54', 59', 75' | Report; Scoreboard | Pen: Díaz Bonilla (1/1) 16' |

Rugby League Park, Christchurch
Attendance: 18,000
Referee: Jaco Peyper (South Africa)

| Crusaders | Jaguares |

| FB | 15 | David Havili |
| RW | 14 | Sevu Reece |
| OC | 13 | Braydon Ennor | (substituted off) 72' |
| IC | 12 | Jack Goodhue |
| LW | 11 | George Bridge |
| FH | 10 | Richie Mo'unga | (substituted off) 76' |
| SH | 9 | Bryn Hall | (substituted off) 53' |
| N8 | 8 | Kieran Read |
| OF | 7 | Matt Todd |
| BF | 6 | Whetukamokamo Douglas | (substituted off) 53' |
| LL | 5 | Sam Whitelock (c) |
| RL | 4 | Mitchell Dunshea | (substituted off) 62' |
| TP | 3 | Owen Franks | (substituted off) 57' |
| HK | 2 | Codie Taylor | (substituted off) 62' |
| LP | 1 | Joe Moody | (substituted off) 54' |
Substitutes:
| HK | 16 | Andrew Makalio | (substituted on) 62' |
| PR | 17 | George Bower | (substituted on) 54' |
| PR | 18 | Michael Alaalatoa | (substituted on) 57' |
| LK | 19 | Luke Romano | (substituted on) 62' |
| FL | 20 | Jordan Taufua | (substituted on) 53' |
| SH | 21 | Mitchell Drummond | (substituted on) 53' |
| IC | 22 | Mitchell Hunt | (substituted on) 76' |
| FB | 23 | Will Jordan | (substituted on) 72' |
Coach:
(New Zealand) Scott Robertson

| FB | 15 | Emiliano Boffelli |
| RW | 14 | Matías Moroni |
| OC | 13 | Matías Orlando |
| IC | 12 | Jerónimo de la Fuente (c) |
| LW | 11 | Ramiro Moyano | (substituted off) 72' |
| FH | 10 | Joaquín Díaz Bonilla | (substituted off) 62' |
| SH | 9 | Tomás Cubelli | (substituted off) 62' |
| N8 | 8 | Javier Ortega Desio | (substituted off) 69' |
| OF | 7 | Marcos Kremer |
| BF | 6 | Pablo Matera |
| LL | 5 | Tomás Lavanini | (substituted off) 63' |
| RL | 4 | Guido Petti |
| TP | 3 | Santiago Medrano | (substituted off) 54' |
| HK | 2 | Agustín Creevy | (substituted off) 54' |
| LP | 1 | Nahuel Tetaz Chaparro | (substituted off) 57' |
Substitutes:
| HK | 16 | Julián Montoya | (substituted on) 54' |
| PR | 17 | Mayco Vivas | (substituted on) 57' |
| PR | 18 | Enrique Pieretto | (substituted on) 54' |
| FL | 19 | Juan Manuel Leguizamón | (substituted on) 69' |
| FL | 20 | Tomás Lezana | (substituted on) 63' |
| SH | 21 | Felipe Ezcurra | (substituted on) 62' |
| FH | 22 | Domingo Miotti | (substituted on) 62' |
| WG | 23 | Sebastián Cancelliere | (substituted on) 72' |
Coach:
(Argentina) Gonzalo Quesada

Man of the Match:
Pablo Matera

Assistant referees:
Mike Fraser (New Zealand)
Paul Williams (New Zealand)
Television match official:
Ben Skeen (New Zealand)
