= Agustín Segura =

Argentine rugby union player

- Born: 21 March 1998 (age 28) Catamarca
- Height: 1.87 m (6 ft 1 1/2 in)
- Weight: 95 kg (209 lb; 14 st 13 lb)

Rugby union career
- Position: Wing
Senior career
Years	Team	Apps	(Points)
2019	Jaguares XV	6	(30)
2020	Ceibos	1	(0)
2021	Jaguares XV		
- Correct as of 1 February 2021
International career
Years	Team	Apps	(Points)
2018	Argentina U20s	1	(0)
2018–2019	Argentina XV	8	(25)
- Correct as of 1 February 2021
National sevens team
Years	Team		Comps
2019	Argentina Sevens		2
- Correct as of 1 February 2021

Agustín Segura (born 21 March 1998) is an Argentine rugby union player, currently playing for Súper Liga Americana de Rugby side Jaguares XV. His preferred position is centre.

== Professional career ==
Segura signed for Súper Liga Americana de Rugby side Jaguares XV ahead of the 2021 Súper Liga Americana de Rugby season. He had previously represented Argentina Sevens in 2019. He previously represented the Jaguares XV in the 2019 Currie Cup First Division and Ceibos in the 2020 Súper Liga Americana de Rugby season.
