= Emiliano Bergamaschi =

Argentine rugby union player

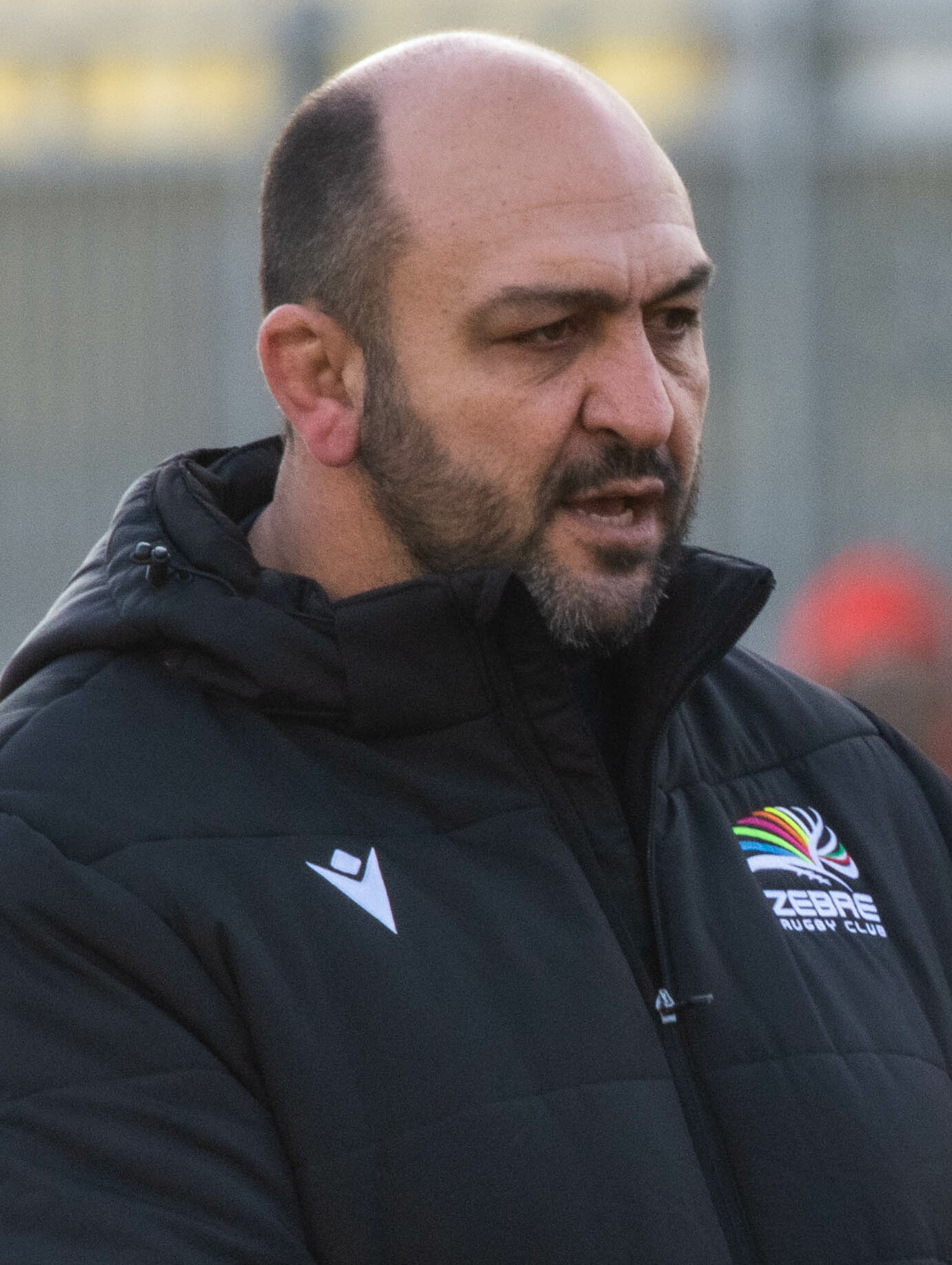
- Born: 4 May 1976 (age 50) Rosario, Santa Fe, Argentina
- Height: 188 cm (6 ft 2 in)
- Weight: 120 kg (265 lb; 18 st 13 lb)

Rugby union career
- Position: Prop
Amateur team(s)
Years	Team	Apps	(Points)
- Atlético del Rosario
Senior career
Years	Team	Apps	(Points)
2002–2003	Bristol	17	(0)
2003–2004	Saracens	19	(0)
2006–2008	Rouen	31	(5)
- Correct as of 27 February 2021
International career
Years	Team	Apps	(Points)
2001	Argentina	1	(0)
- Correct as of 27 February 2021
Coaching career
- Years: Team
- 2015: Argentina (Assistant coach)
- 2020: Olímpia Lions (Assistant coach)
- 2021: Cobras Brasil XV (Head coach)
- 2021−2025: Zebre (Assistant coach)
- 2022: Zebre (Interim head coach)
- 2025–: Stade Niçois (Forwards coach)
- Correct as of 27 February 2021

Emiliano Bergamaschi (born 4 May 1976) is an Argentine rugby union coach and former player. He is the current forwards coach of Stade Niçois in Pro D2.

== Playing career ==
During his playing career, Bergamaschi was a prop. He was capped at international level by Argentina, playing for the senior team on one occasion in 2001 against the United States. Bergamaschi spent spells playing in England for both Bristol and Saracens, as well as playing in France for Rouen.

== Coaching ==
Following his retirement, Bergamaschi went into coaching. He was assistant coach to Daniel Hourcade for Argentina at the 2015 Rugby World Cup. In 2020, he was assistant to Raúl Pérez at the Olímpia Lions in the 2020 Súper Liga Americana de Rugby season. In January 2021, he was appointed head coach of the Cobras Brasil XV team for the 2021 Súper Liga Americana de Rugby season.

From January 2022 to April 2022, he was interim Head coach of Zebre.
