= Cafeteros Pro =

Colombian rugby union team

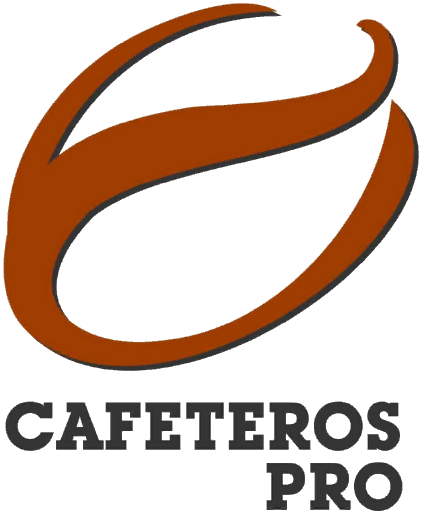
- Full name: Los Cafeteros Pro
- Founded: 2019; 6 years ago
- Disbanded: 2022; 3 years ago
- Location: Medellín, Colombia
- Ground: TBA
- League: SLAR
- 2022: 4th Playoffs; Semi-finals
1st kit	2nd kit

Cafeteros Pro were a professional rugby union team based in Medellín, Colombia. The team was founded in 2020 to compete in Súper Liga Americana de Rugby finals series of the 2020 Súper Liga Americana de Rugby season, however the season was cancelled following the COVID-19 pandemic. The team however did join the competition full-time ahead of the 2021 Súper Liga Americana de Rugby season. Cafeteros Pro became the first professional rugby union team from Colombia.

== Beginnings ==
Ahead of the 2021 season, Cafeteros Pro appointed Argentine Rodolfo Ambrosio as head coach. The team is set to have a budget of US$330,000 for their first season and their side will be a mixture of Colombian professional players and Argentine professional players. The team along with the Paraguayan SLAR side Olímpia Lions will have priority of drafting Argentine players, with there being an excess of Argentine players due to the Argentine Jaguares side departing Super Rugby. On 4 January 2021, it was announced that 10 Argentine players had been drafted to the side. In the longer term the team is hoping to become a Colombian-centric team, with 90% of the players to be Colombians. Ahead of the 2021 season, there were seven Colombian players playing professional rugby in foreign leagues: Brayan Campiño and Andrés Zafra (both playing in France), Julio Cesar Giraldo (who played for American side Rugby United New York in the 2020 Major League Rugby season), Giovanni Carvajal, Diver Ceballos and Danny Giraldo (who all played for the Uruguayan side Peñarol in the 2020 SLAR) and Johan Larrota.

== Stadium ==
The Cafeteros Pro have yet to announce their stadium or stadia in Medellín ahead of the 2021 Súper Liga Americana de Rugby season.
