= Rodolfo Ambrosio =

Argentine rugby union player

- Born: 27 December 1961 (age 64) Córdoba, Argentina

Rugby union career
- Position: Center
Amateur team(s)
Years	Team	Apps	(Points)
1980–1985	Tala Rugby Club		
Senior career
Years	Team	Apps	(Points)
- CUS Roma Rugby
- Rugby San Donà
International career
Years	Team	Apps	(Points)
1986–1991	Italy	12	(13)
Coaching career
- Years: Team
- 1999–2000: Córdoba
- 2002–2004: Petrarca
- 2005–2007: Segni
- 2013–2014: Argentina U20
- 2014–2019: Brazil
- 2020–2021: Cafeteros Pro
- 2024: Portugal (assistant coach)
- 2024–2026: Uruguay
- Correct as of 7 August 2026

Carlos Rodolfo Ambrosio was born on 27 December 1961 in Córdoba, Argentina. He is an Argentine rugby union former player where he played as a fly-half and as a center, and is more recently was the head coach of the Uruguayan national team.

== Playing career ==
He played for Tala Rugby Club in Córdoba, Argentina, before moving to Italy in 1985. He initially played for CUS Roma Rugby, where he earned a call-up to the Italian national team in 1986. He qualified for Italy through his Italian grandfather. becoming the first Italian-Argentine to play for the Azzurri.

He made his international debut against a Scotland XV side in 1986, and was later part of the Italian squad for the 1987 Rugby World Cup, playing in just one game - against New Zealand in the tournament opener. He later played a part in various tour matches for his adapted country, before playing his last game in Moscow on 5 November 1989, a 15-12 loss to the Soviet Union, for the 1989-1990 FIRA Trophy.

Injury in 1991 cost Ambrosio more caps after that test, and a place in Italy's 1991 Rugby World Cup squad, before finishing his career in Italy with Rugby San Donà before career ending achilles injury in 1998.

== Coaching career ==
After retiring from the game in 1998, Ambrosio took up coaching, beginning with Córdoba Rugby Club in 1999 to 2000. He returned to Italy where he was head coach of Petrarca Rugby from 2002 to 2004 and Segni from 2005 to 2007. Following his five year stint in Italy, Ambrosio returned to Argentina to take up a newly created role within the Argentine Rugby Union High Performance programme, becoming a Regional Manager in Córdoba before taking over the direction of the federal technical sector of the youth in the region.

This position led to him becoming the Argentine U20 head coach in 2013, taking the national age-grade side to the 2013 IRB Junior World Championship (finishing sixth) and the 2014 IRB Junior World Championship (finishing in ninth).

Returning back to coaching in 2013 later saw Ambrosio appointed head coach of Brazi in November 2014. His reign included important wins against Canada and the United States, while they also broke Argentina's domination in the South American Rugby Championship, winning that tournament in 2018.

He left his post with Brazil in 2019 after failing to advance within the 2019 Rugby World Cup qualification process, and returned to high performance with Daniel Hourcade within Sudamérica Rugby. As part of his role, he became head coach with newly founded Colombian side Cafeteros Pro in 2020, but his duties were delayed by a year due to the COVID-19 pandemic. After one season with the side, and losing all games in the 2021 Súper Liga Americana de Rugby season, he stood down as head coach.

In 2022 and 2023, he became a technical advisor for Chile during their run to the 2023 Rugby World Cup, and in 2024, followed Hourcade to Portugal where he became assistant coach for their national side during the 2024 Rugby Europe Championship.

In April 2024, he was appointed head coach of Uruguay.

In his first campaign in charge, Ambrosio led Uruguay against three Tier 1 nations during the 2024 mid-year rugby union tests, which resulted in three loss; 28–43 against France, 5–79 against Argentina and 19–31 against Scotland. His first win came against Romania during the 2024 end-of-year rugby union internationals where they won 21–23. This came on the back of two losses to Spain and Japan.

In August 2025, he led Uruguay to qualification for the 2027 Men's Rugby World Cup, qualifying as Sudamérica 2 behind Chile who qualified as Sudamérica 1. In November 2025, Uruguay secured two wins during their European tour; 8–26 against Portugal and 21–31 against Romania. However, their 2025 form was not carried over into the inaugural World Rugby Nations Cup campaign in July 2026, where they lost all there of their home games. This resulted in the URU sacking Ambrosio in August 2026.

== Honours ==
Tala Rugby Club

- Torneo de Córdoba
  - Winners: 1981, 1983, 1984, 1985

Sporting positions
Preceded by (Uruguay) Esteban Meneses	Uruguay National Rugby Union Coach; 2024–2026	Succeeded by Vacant
