= Ignacio Péculo =

Uruguayan rugby union player

- Born: Ignacio Alfredo Péculo Rodriguez; 22 February 1999 (age 27) Uruguay
- Height: 1.89 m (6 ft 2 1/2 in)
- Weight: 134 kg (21.1 st; 295 lb)

Rugby union career
- Position: Prop
- Current team: Chicago Hounds
Senior career
Years	Team	Apps	(Points)
2020–2023	Peñarol	26	(10)
2024-	Chicago Hounds	8	(5)
- Correct as of 21 April 2024
International career
Years	Team	Apps	(Points)
2018–2020	Uruguay U20s	7	(0)
2020–	Uruguay XV	3	(0)
2020–	Uruguay	13	(0)
- Correct as of 9 September 2023

Ignacio Péculo (born 22 February 1999) is an Uruguayan rugby union player, currently playing for Major League Rugby side Chicago Hounds. His preferred position is prop.

== Professional career ==
Péculo signed for Súper Liga Americana de Rugby side Peñarol ahead of the 2020 Súper Liga Americana de Rugby season, before re-signing ahead of the 2021 Súper Liga Americana de Rugby season. He has also represented the Uruguay national team.
