= Conrado Roura =

Argentine rugby union player

- Born: 28 February 1996 (age 30) Córdoba, Argentina
- Height: 1.92 m (6 ft 3 1/2 in)
- Weight: 102 kg (16.1 st; 225 lb)

Rugby union career
- Position: Flanker
- Current team: Valorugby Emilia
Senior career
Years	Team	Apps	(Points)
2020	Ceibos	1	(0)
2021	Peñarol	10	(10)
2022–2023	Dallas Jackals	28	(30)
2023−2025	Rangers Vicenza	31	(45)
2025−	Valorugby Emilia		
- Correct as of 9 February 2022
International career
Years	Team	Apps	(Points)
2016	Argentina U20s	4	(0)
- Correct as of 2 February 2021
National sevens team
Years	Team		Comps
2017–2018	Argentina Sevens		12
- Correct as of 2 February 2021

Conrado Roura (born 28 February 1996) is an Argentine rugby union player, currently playing for the Valorugby Emilia in Serie A Élite in Italy. He also plays for Súper Liga Americana de Rugby side Peñarol, for Dallas Jackals in Major League Rugby in the United States Rangers Vicenza in Serie A Élite in Italy. His preferred position is flanker.

== Professional career ==
Roura signed for Súper Liga Americana de Rugby side Peñarol ahead of the 2021 Súper Liga Americana de Rugby season. He had previously agreed to join Dallas Jackals in Major League Rugby, before the withdrew from the 2021 season. He previously represented Argentina Sevens at 13 competitions between 2017 and 2018.
