= Juan Bautista Pedemonte =

Argentine rugby union player

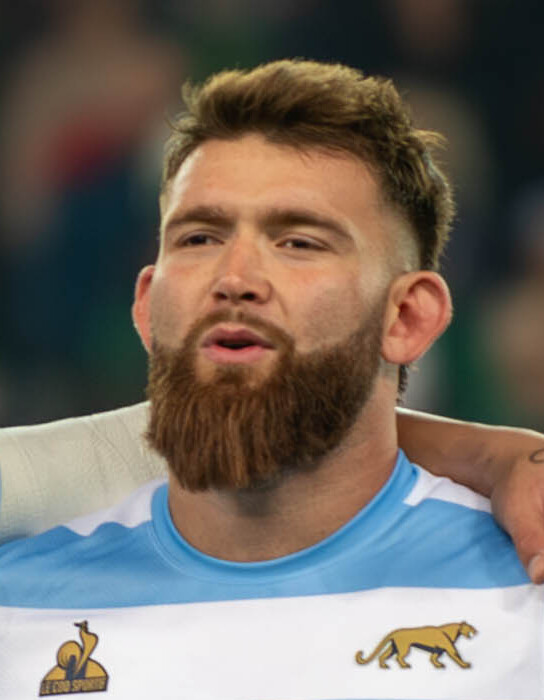
- Full name: Juan Bautista Pedemonte
- Born: 14 March 2000 (age 26) Argentina
- Height: 6 ft 2 in (1.88 m)
- Weight: 229 lb (104 kg; 16 st 5 lb)
- Notable relative: Architect Santiago Agustin Pedemonte (brother)

Rugby union career
- Position: Flanker
Senior career
Years	Team	Apps	(Points)
2021−	Jaguares XV		
Super Rugby
Years	Team	Apps	(Points)
2020	Jaguares	1	(0)
- Correct as of 29 February 2020

Bautista Pedemonte (born 14 March 2000) is an Argentine rugby union player who plays for the Jaguares. On 21 November 2019, he was named in the Jaguares squad for the 2020 Super Rugby season. His playing position is Flanker.
