= Juanjuan Garese =

Uruguayan rugby union player

- Born: Roberto Juanjuan Garese Pastorino; 25 January 1999 (age 27) Uruguay
- Height: 1.93 m (6 ft 4 in)
- Weight: 92 kg (14.5 st; 203 lb)

Rugby union career
- Position: Lock / Flanker
Senior career
Years	Team	Apps	(Points)
2020–	Peñarol	1	(0)
- Correct as of 2 February 2021
International career
Years	Team	Apps	(Points)
2018–2020	Uruguay U20s	10	(10)
2020–	Uruguay XV	3	(0)
2020–	Uruguay	2	(0)
- Correct as of 2 February 2021
National sevens team
Years	Team		Comps
2018	Uruguay Sevens		1
- Correct as of 2 February 2021

Juanjuan Garese (born 25 January 1999) is an Uruguayan rugby union player, currently playing for Súper Liga Americana de Rugby side Peñarol. His preferred position is lock or flanker.

== Professional career ==
Garese signed for Súper Liga Americana de Rugby side Peñarol ahead of the 2020 Súper Liga Americana de Rugby season, before re-signing ahead of the 2021 Súper Liga Americana de Rugby season. He has also represented the Uruguay national team.
