= Maximiliano Filizzola =

Argentine rugby union player

- Born: 2 April 1996 (age 30) Argentina
- Height: 1.75 m (5 ft 9 in)
- Weight: 81 kg (179 lb; 12 st 11 lb)

Rugby union career
- Position: Centre
Amateur team(s)
Years	Team	Apps	(Points)
- Marista Rugby Club
Senior career
Years	Team	Apps	(Points)
2021	Selknam	7	(8)
2021−2022	Piacenza Lyons	10	(19)
- Correct as of 1 February 2021
National sevens team
Years	Team		Comps
2017–2018	Argentina Sevens		7
- Correct as of 1 February 2021

Maximiliano Filizzola (born 2 April 1996) is an Argentine rugby union player, currently playing for Italian Top10 side Piacenza Lyons. His preferred position is centre.

== Professional career ==
Filizzola signed for Súper Liga Americana de Rugby side Selknam ahead of the 2021 Súper Liga Americana de Rugby season. In 2021−2022 season he played for Italian Top10 side Piacenza Lyons.
He had previously represented Argentina Sevens at 7 tournaments.
