= Chang Ho Ahn =

Japanese rugby union player

Ahn Chang-ho
- Full name: Ahn Chang-ho
- Born: 20 November 1997 (age 28) Japan
- Height: 1.77 m (5 ft 10 in)
- Weight: 108 kg (17 st 0 lb; 238 lb)

Rugby union career
- Position: Prop
- Current team: Mitsubishi Dynaboars
Senior career
Years	Team	Apps	(Points)
2020	Sunwolves	0	(0)
2021–2024	Canon Eagles	44	(0)
2024–	Mitsubishi Dynaboars	22	(10)
- Correct as of 13 October 2021
International career
Years	Team	Apps	(Points)
2017	Japan U20	5	(10)
- Correct as of 13 October 2021

Ahn Chang-ho (安昌豪, An shōkō; born 20 November 1997) is a Japanese rugby union player who plays as a prop. He currently plays for Yokohama Canon Eagles in Japan's domestic Japan Rugby League One. He was signed to the Sunwolves squad for the 2020 Super Rugby season, but did not make an appearance for the side.
