= Nicolás Freitas (rugby union) =

Uruguayan rugby union player

- Born: 3 July 1993 (age 33)
- Height: 1.80 m (5 ft 11 in)
- Weight: 90 kg (198 lb)

Rugby union career
- Position(s): Wing, Centre
Amateur team(s)
Years	Team	Apps	(Points)
2012–2016	Carrasco Polo Club		
2018−	Carrasco Polo Club		
Senior career
Years	Team	Apps	(Points)
2017	Jaguares	0	(0)
2020–2021	Peñarol	1	(0)
2021-present	Vannes	31	(20)
- Correct as of 21 May 2023
International career
Years	Team	Apps	(Points)
2014-	Uruguay	51	(46)
- Correct as of 14 September 2023

Nicolás Freitas Alleges (born 3 July 1993) is a Uruguayan professional rugby union player. He currently plays for Vannes in the French Pro D2.

In January 2017, he signed his first professional contract with Argentine side Jaguares.
