= Joaquín Díaz Bonilla =

Argentine rugby union player

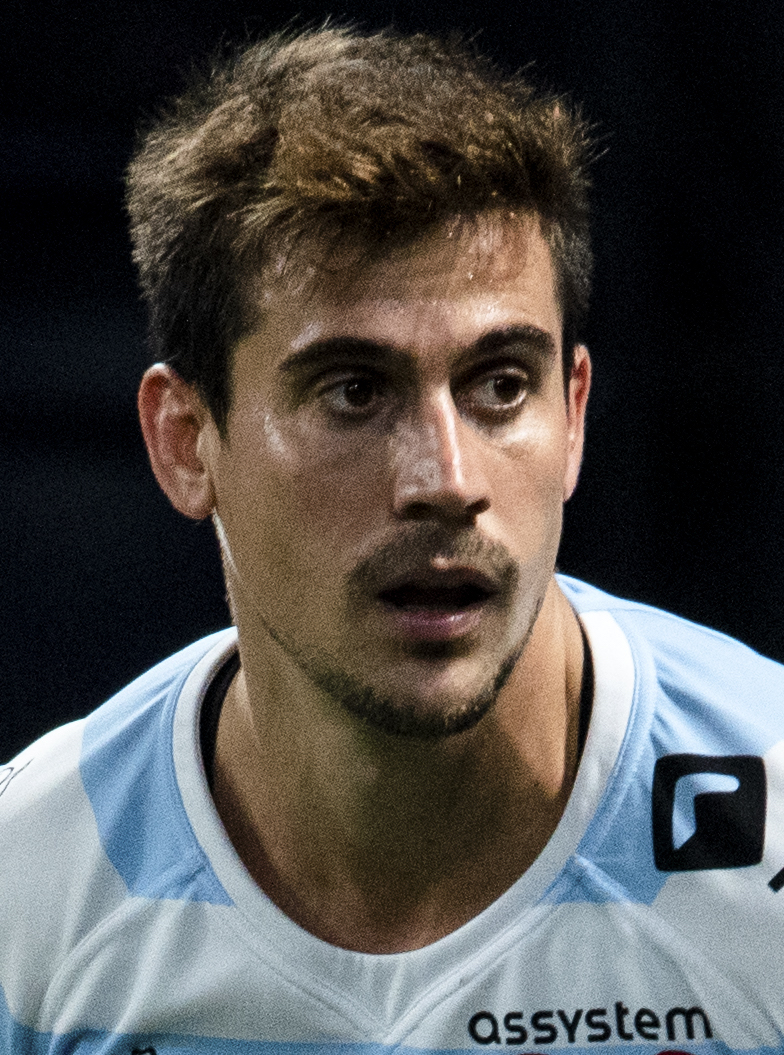
- Born: 12 April 1989 (age 37) Buenos Aires, Argentina
- Height: 5 ft 8 in (1.73 m)
- Weight: 174 lb (79 kg; 12 st 6 lb)

Rugby union career
- Position: Fly-half
- Current team: Hindú
Amateur team(s)
Years	Team	Apps	(Points)
2010–2017	Hindú	135	(1109)
Senior career
Years	Team	Apps	(Points)
2017–2020	Jaguares	28	(18)
2019	Racing 92	6	(4)
2020–2021	Leicester Tigers	5	(23)
2021–2022	Sharks	8	(14)
2022	Sharks (Currie Cup)	4	(25)
2023	Old Glory DC		
- Correct as of 27 February 2023
International career
Years	Team	Apps	(Points)
2009	Argentina U20	5	(20)
2013–2018	Argentina XV	15	(107)
2016–2019	Argentina	6	(7)
- Correct as of 16 September 2022
National sevens team
Years	Team		Comps
2016–	Argentina Sevens		12
- Correct as of 23 July 2022

Joaquín Díaz Bonilla (born 12 April 1989) is an Argentine rugby union player. His position is fly-half and plays for Old Glory DC of Major League Rugby (MLR) in the U.S. He was part of the national Argentina team, The Pumas.

Bonilla played domestically in Argentina for Hindú Club in the Torneo de la URBA, before turning professional with the Super Rugby side Jaguares, both sides play in Buenos Aires. Diaz Bonilla started at fly half for Jaguares in the 2019 Super Rugby Final, where they lost to New Zealand's Crusaders.

During the 2019 Rugby World Cup Diaz Bonilla played for Racing 92 in France's Top 14 as cover for Finn Russell and Ben Volavola.

Bonilla returned to the Jaguares for the aborted 2020 Super Rugby season, featuring in 3 games before the season was cut short due to coronavirus.

On 21 September 2020 he signed for Leicester Tigers in England's Premiership Rugby, he made his debut as a replacement against London Irish but played only five times before his release was announced on 16 June 2021.

On 15 August 2021 Bonilla joined Sharks, based in Durban, South Africa, for their debut United Rugby Championship season.
