= Eric Dosantos =

Uruguayan rugby union player

- Born: Eric Dosantos; 25 February 1995 (age 31) Uruguay
- Height: 1.88 m (6 ft 2 in)
- Weight: 103 kg (16.2 st; 227 lb)

Rugby union career
- Position: Flanker
Senior career
Years	Team	Apps	(Points)
2021–2023	Peñarol	0	(0)
- Correct as of 2 February 2021
International career
Years	Team	Apps	(Points)
2015	Uruguay U20s	4	(0)
2020–2023	Uruguay XV	2	(0)
2020–2023	Uruguay	13	(5)
- Correct as of 2 February 2021

Eric Dosantos (born 25 February 1995) is an Uruguayan former rugby union player, currently playing for Súper Liga Americana de Rugby side Peñarol. His preferred position is flanker.

== Professional career ==
Dosantos signed for Súper Liga Americana de Rugby side Peñarol ahead of the 2021 Súper Liga Americana de Rugby season. He has also represented the Uruguay national team.

In December 2023, Dosantos announced his retirement from professional rugby to pursue engineering.
