= Juan Pablo Zeiss =

Argentine rugby union player

- Born: 2 August 1989 (age 37) Argentina
- Height: 6 ft 1 in (1.85 m)
- Weight: 247 lb (112 kg; 17 st 9 lb)

Rugby union career
- Position: Prop
Amateur team(s)
Years	Team	Apps	(Points)
2011−	Los Matreros	11	(5)
Senior career
Years	Team	Apps	(Points)
2020	Ceibos	2	(0)
2021	Jaguares XV		
2022	Houston SaberCats		
2023	Dallas Jackals		
- Correct as of 6 March 2023
Super Rugby
Years	Team	Apps	(Points)
2018–2019	Jaguares	16	(0)
- Correct as of 18 February 2018
International career
Years	Team	Apps	(Points)
2018−	Argentina	4	(0)
- Correct as of 16 November 2018

Juan Pablo Zeiss (born 2 August 1989) is an Argentine rugby union player who plays for the Jaguares. He also plays for the Dallas Jackals in Major League Rugby (MLR). His playing position is at prop.

On 2 January 2018, Zeiss was named in the Jaguares squad for the 2018 Super Rugby season. He previously played for the Houston SaberCats in the MLR.
