= Mayco Vivas =

Argentine rugby union footballer

- Full name: Mayco Geronimo Vivas
- Born: 2 June 1998 (age 28) Rafaela, Argentina
- Height: 1.85 m (6 ft 1 in)
- Weight: 124 kg (273 lb; 19 st 7 lb)
- School: EETP 460 Rafaela, Santa Fe

Rugby union career
- Position: Prop
- Current team: Gloucester
Senior career
Years	Team	Apps	(Points)
2017	Atlético del Rosario	17	(20)
2019–2020	Jaguares	23	(0)
2021	Jaguares XV	13	(0)
2022–2025	Gloucester	30	(0)
2025–	Oyonnax	3	(0)
- Correct as of 28 August 2023
International career
Years	Team	Apps	(Points)
2017−2018	Argentina U20	12	(0)
2019−	Argentina	40	(0)
2023	Argentina XV	4	(0)
- Correct as of 28 August 2023

Mayco Geronimo Vivas (born 2 June 1998) is an Argentine professional rugby union player who plays as a prop for Premiership Rugby club Gloucester and the Argentina national team.

== Club career ==
On 5 October 2022, Vivas travels to England to join Gloucester in the Premiership Rugby from the 2022–23 season.

On 9 July 2025, Vivas would leave Gloucester to move to France to join Oyonnax in the Pro D2 competition from the 2025–26 season.
