= Tevita Tupou =

Japanese rugby union player (born 1991)

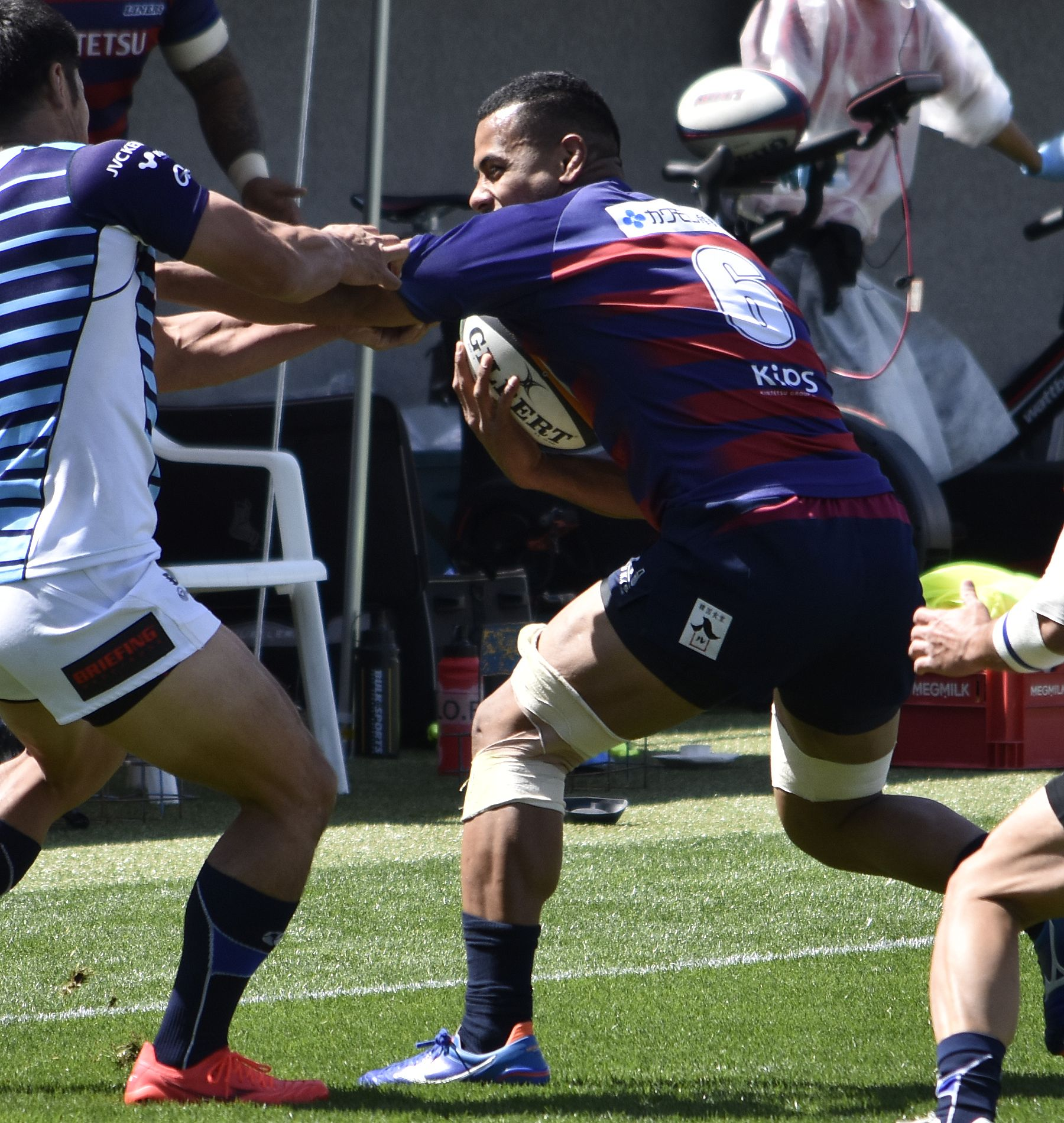
- Full name: Tevita Tupou
- Born: 26 September 1991 (age 35) Tonga
- Height: 1.85 m (6 ft 1 in)
- Weight: 104 kg (16 st 5 lb; 229 lb)

Rugby union career
- Position(s): Flanker, Number 8
Senior career
Years	Team	Apps	(Points)
2016–2020	Panasonic Wild Knights	9	(10)
2020	Sunwolves	4	(0)
2021–2024	Kintetsu Liners	18	(5)
2024–2026	Honda Heat	11	(5)
- Correct as of 22 February 2021
National sevens team
Years	Team		Comps
2018	Japan Sevens		3
- Correct as of 22 February 2022

Tevita Tupou (ツポウ テビタ, Tebita to~upou; born 26 September 1991) is a Tongan born Japanese rugby union player who plays as a Flanker. He currently plays for Sunwolves in Super Rugby.
