= Juan Pablo Castro =

Argentine rugby union player

- Full name: Juan Pablo Castro Collado
- Born: 20 April 1999 (age 27) San Juan, Argentina
- Height: 6 ft 2 in (1.88 m)
- Weight: 213 lb (97 kg; 15 st 3 lb)

Rugby union career
- Position: Centre
Senior career
Years	Team	Apps	(Points)
2019	Jaguares XV	4	(20)
2020	Ceibos		
2021−	Jaguares XV		
- Correct as of 21 November 2019
Super Rugby
Years	Team	Apps	(Points)
2020	Jaguares	0	(0)
- Correct as of 21 November 2019
International career
Years	Team	Apps	(Points)
2017−2019	Argentina Under 20	11	(10)
2020−	Argentina XV	3	(0)

Juan Pablo Castro (born 20 April 1999) is an Argentine rugby union player who plays for the Jaguares. On 21 November 2019, he was named in the Jaguares squad for the 2020 Super Rugby season. His playing position is Centre.
