= Santiago Chocobares =

Argentine rugby union player

- Born: 31 March 1999 (age 27) Rufino, Argentina
- Height: 1.90 m (6 ft 3 in)
- Weight: 101 kg (223 lb; 15 st 13 lb)

Rugby union career
- Position: Centre
- Current team: Toulouse
Senior career
Years	Team	Apps	(Points)
2018–2019	Duendes	7	(0)
2020	Jaguares	6	(5)
2021–	Toulouse	46	(50)
- Correct as of 28 June 2024
International career
Years	Team	Apps	(Points)
2018–2019	Argentina U20	7	(5)
2020–	Argentina	31	(5)
- Correct as of 28 September 2024

Santiago Chocobares (born 31 March 1999) is an Argentine professional rugby union player who plays as a centre for Top 14 club Toulouse and the Argentina national team.

== Club career ==
On 21 November 2019, he was named in the Jaguares squad for the 2020 Super Rugby season.

== International career ==
Chocobares made his debut for the Argentina national team on 14 November 2020 in their first ever win against the All Blacks.

== Honours ==
Toulouse

- European Rugby Champions Cup: 2024
