= Francisco Gorrissen =

Argentine rugby union player (born 1994)

- Full name: Francisco Gorrissen
- Born: 30 August 1994 (age 32) Argentina
- Height: 6 ft 3 in (1.91 m)
- Weight: 229 lb (104 kg; 16 st 5 lb)

Rugby union career
- Position: Flanker
Senior career
Years	Team	Apps	(Points)
2014–2021	Belgrano	101	(95)
2019−2021	Jaguares XV	16	(10)
2021−	Vannes		
- Correct as of 9 June 2019
Super Rugby
Years	Team	Apps	(Points)
2019–2020	Jaguares	7	(0)
- Correct as of 9 June 2019
International career
Years	Team	Apps	(Points)
2017−2019	Argentina XV	16	(10)
2020−	Argentina	2	(0)

Francisco Gorrissen (born 30 August 1994) is an Argentine rugby union player who plays for the Vannes. Previously he played for Belgrano and the Jaguares.
