= Facundo Gattas =

Uruguayan rugby union player

Facundo Gattás
- Full name: Facundo Eduardo Gattás Clávell
- Born: 2 July 1995 (age 31) Montevideo, Uruguay
- Height: 183 cm (6 ft 0 in)
- Weight: 116 kg (256 lb)

Rugby union career
- Position(s): Hooker, Prop
- Current team: Hindu
Senior career
Years	Team	Apps	(Points)
2018−	Hindu	21	(10)
2021	Peñarol	11	(30)
2022-2025	Old Glory DC	43	(50)
- Correct as of 5 April 2022
International career
Years	Team	Apps	(Points)
2014−2015	Uruguay Under 20	7	(10)
2016–present	Uruguay		(10)
- Correct as of 9 September 2023

Facundo Eduardo Gattás Clavell (born 2 July 1995) is a Uruguay rugby union player who generally plays as a hooker although he started his career as a prop. He is playing for Old Glory DC professionally and Uruguay internationally. He was included in the Uruguayan squad for the 2019 Rugby World Cup which was held in Japan for the first time and also marked his first World Cup appearance.

== Career ==
He made his international debut for Uruguay against Canada on 6 February 2016. He was also part of the Uruguayan team which won the 2017 World Rugby Nations Cup.

He got his professional debut in 2021 with Peñarol in Súper Liga Americana de Rugby (SLAR). He did not re-sign with Peñarol for a second season, instead returning to Argentinian amateur club Hindu. He returned to professional rugby when he was picked up by Old Glory DC in Major League Rugby partway through the 2022 season.
