= Diego Arbelo =

Uruguayan rugby union player

- Full name: Diego Arbelo Garcia
- Born: 19 August 1994 (age 32) Montevideo, Uruguay
- Height: 190 cm (6 ft 3 in)
- Weight: 124 kg (273 lb)
- School: San José de la Providencia
- University: Universidad de la República

Rugby union career
- Position: Prop
- Current team: Aparejadores Rugby
Youth career
- -: Circulo Tennis Montevideo
- –: Montevideo Cricket Club
Senior career
Years	Team	Apps	(Points)
2020−2023	Peñarol	28	(0)
2023−2024	Colorno	10	
2024−2026	Rouen Normandie Rugby		
2026−	Aparejadores Rugby		
- Correct as of 21 August 2026
International career
Years	Team	Apps	(Points)
2013−2014	Uruguay Under 20	8	(0)
2016–present	Uruguay	28	(0)
- Correct as of 25 September 2019

Diego Arbelo Garcia (born 19 August 1994) is an Uruguay rugby union player who generally plays as a prop. He represents Uruguay internationally and plays for Spanish club Aparejadores Rugby.

== Club career ==
Arbelo played at amateur level at Círculo de Tenis de Montevideo, and later joined Montevideo Cricket Club. He joined Peñarol for the 2020 season.

In the 2023–24 season he played for Italian club Colorno. The following season he moved to France to play for Rouen Normandie Rugby.

In the summer of 2026, his signing for Recoletas Burgos - Caja Rural of the Spanish first division was announced.

== International career ==
Arbelo made his international debut for Uruguay against Paraguay on 30 April 2016. He was included in the Uruguayan squad for the 2019 Rugby World Cup which is held in Japan for the first time and also marks his first World Cup appearance. On 21 August, he was also named in the squad for the 2023 Rugby World Cup.
