= Raúl Pérez (rugby union) =

Argentine rugby union player

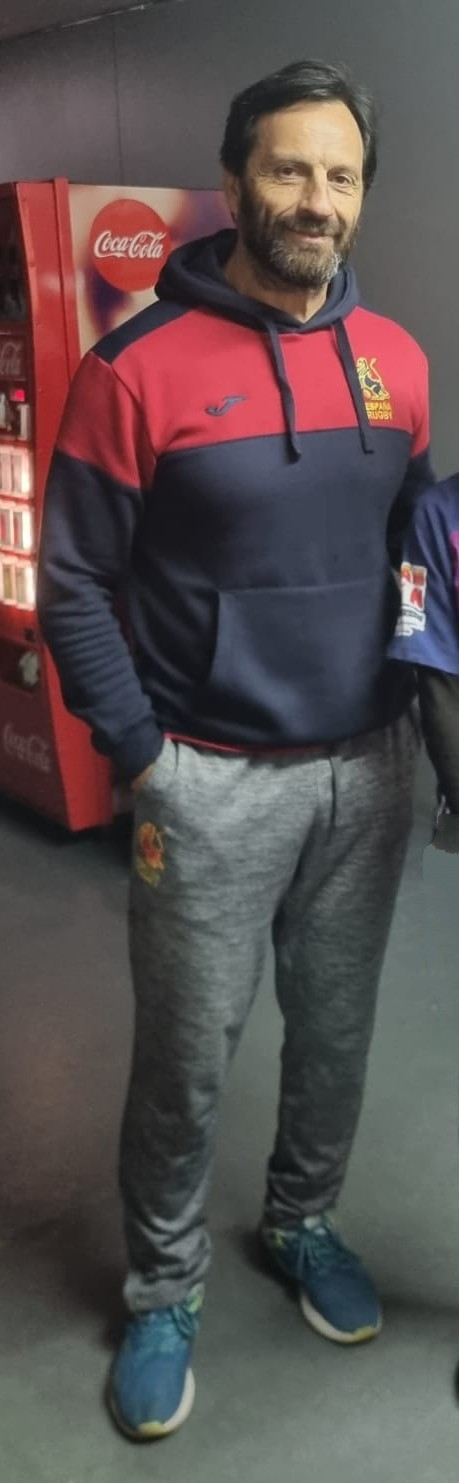
- Born: 2 July 1965 (age 61) Buenos Aires
- Height: 6 ft 3 in (1.91 m)
- Weight: 230 lb (100 kg; 16 st 6 lb)

Rugby union career
- Position: Flanker
Senior career
Years	Team	Apps	(Points)
1983–2000	Duendes		
International career
Years	Team	Apps	(Points)
1992–1999	Argentina	21	(5)
Coaching career
- Years: Team
- 2016–2017: Jaguares
- 2018–present: Paraguay
- 2020-present: Olimpia Lions

Raúl Norberto Pérez (born Rosario 2 July 1965) is an Argentine rugby union former player and coach of the Argentine Super Rugby side, the Jaguares. He is currently the head coach of Paraguay national rugby union team (Los Yakares). He played as a flanker. He worked as a systems analyst and programmer.

He played for Duendes Rugby Club his entire career, from 1983/84 to 1999/2000.

Pérez had 21 caps for Argentina, from 1992 to 1999, scoring 1 try, 5 points in aggregate. He was selected for the 1999 Rugby World Cup but never played.

== Coaching ==
After finishing his playing days, he became the coach of Duendes, from 2001/02 to 2004/05. He later also would be the coach of the Rosario Rugby Union U-23 team, from 2005 to 2007, of Argentina U-21, from 2007 to 2008, and since 2009, he is one of the two coaches of the Argentina A. From 2013, he has been the assistant coach for the National senior side under head coach Daniel Hourcade. By July 2018, Pérez become Paraguay Head coach.
