= Guido Petti =

Argentine rugby union player

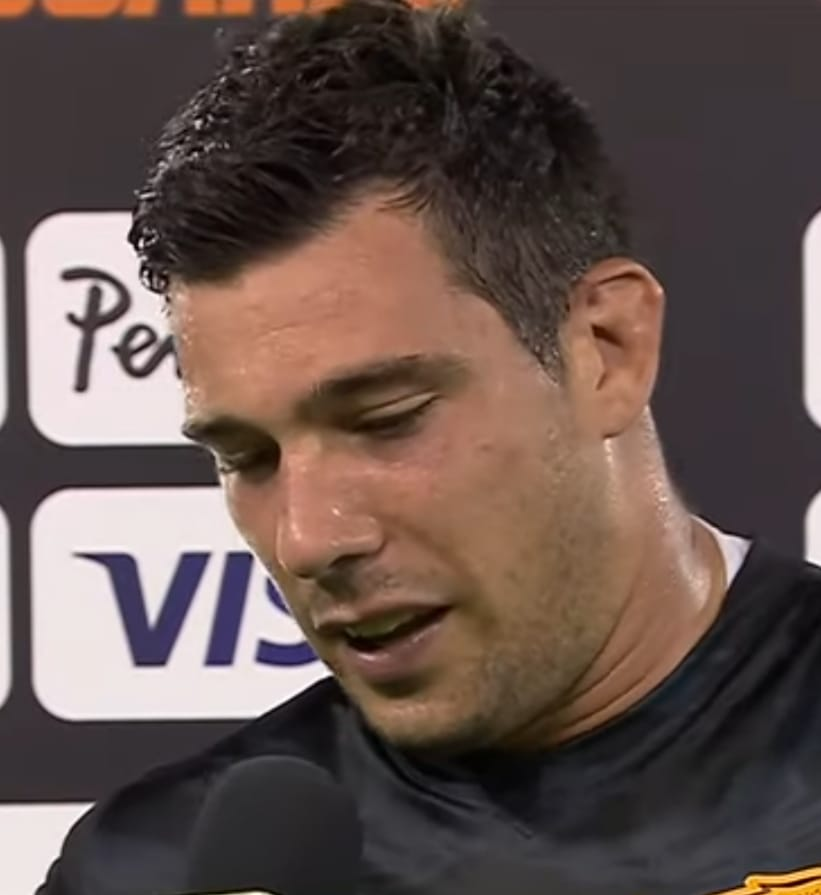
- Petti representing the Jaguares during Super Rugby
- Full name: Guido Petti Pagadizábal
- Born: 17 November 1994 (age 31) Buenos Aires, Argentina
- Height: 1.93 m (6 ft 4 in)
- Weight: 110 kg (243 lb; 17 st 5 lb)

Rugby union career
- Position(s): Lock, Flanker
- Current team: Harlequins
Senior career
Years	Team	Apps	(Points)
2014	San Isidro	11	(0)
2014–2015	Pampas XV	6	(5)
2016−2020	Jaguares	68	(25)
2020−2025	Bordeaux Begles	77	(25)
2025−	Harlequins	16	(5)
- Correct as of 27 April 2026
International career
Years	Team	Apps	(Points)
2012	Argentina U18s	1	(0)
2013	Argentina U19s	2	(0)
2013−2014	Argentina U20s	8	(0)
2013−2014	Argentina Jaguars	5	(0)
2014–	Argentina	97	(20)
- Correct as of 7 September 2025

Guido Petti Pagadizábal (born 17 November 1994) is an Argentine professional rugby union player who plays as a lock and flanker for Prem Rugby club Harlequins and the Argentina national team.

== Club career ==
Guido played with San Isidro Club in the Torneo de la URBA in his homeland. In 2016 he joined the Jaguares, Argentina's Super Rugby team. In 2020 he moved to France to play for Bordeaux Begles in the Top 14. In May 2025, he started the 2024–25 Champions Cup final at flanker, playing the entire game as they defeated Northampton Saints 28–20 to win the club their first ever trophy. In June 2025, he scored a try in the Top 14 final, his last game for the club, as Bordeaux were eventually defeated by Toulouse 39–33 in extra time.

In February 2025, he signed with Premiership Rugby side Harlequins for the following season. In October 2025, he made his debut in a 20–14 victory against Saracens. In April 2026, he scored his first try for the club against Sale Sharks.

== International career ==
Petti was a member of the Argentina Under-20 side which competed in the 2013 and 2014 IRB Junior World Championships, he also represented the Argentina Jaguars side in 2013 and 2014 and played for the Pampas XV during their 2014 tour of Oceania.

He made his senior debut for Los Pumas on 14 November 2014 in a 20–18 victory over Italy in Genoa.

He was part of the national team that competed at the 2015 Rugby World Cup.

Petti was a starter for the Argentina national team on 14 November 2020 in their first ever win against the All Blacks.

== Honours ==
Bordeaux Bègles

- 1× European Rugby Champions Cup: 2025
