= Federico Favaro =

Uruguayan rugby union player

- Full name: Federico Favaro
- Born: 19 May 1991 (age 35) Montevideo, Uruguay
- Height: 174 cm (5 ft 9 in)
- Weight: 74 kg (163 lb)

Rugby union career
- Position: Wing
- Current team: Peñarol
Senior career
Years	Team	Apps	(Points)
2020−	Peñarol	1	(0)
- Correct as of 5 October 2019
International career
Years	Team	Apps	(Points)
2013–present	Uruguay	30	(145)
- Correct as of 5 October 2019

Federico Favaro Garcia (born 19 May 1991) is an Uruguay rugby union player who generally plays as a wing represents Uruguay internationally. He was included in the Uruguayan squad for the 2019 Rugby World Cup which was held in Japan for the first time and also marked his first World Cup appearance.

== Career ==
He made his international debut for Uruguay against Brazil on 1 May 2013.
