= Felipe Ezcurra =

Argentine rugby union player

- Born: 15 April 1993 (age 33) Buenos Aires, Argentina
- Height: 5 ft 10 in (1.78 m)
- Weight: 196 lb (14 st 0 lb; 89 kg)

Rugby union career
- Position: Scrum-half
Amateur team(s)
Years	Team	Apps	(Points)
2011−	Hindú	100	(90)
Senior career
Years	Team	Apps	(Points)
2015	Pampas XV	4	(0)
2018	Leicester Tigers	2	(0)
2021	Jaguares XV	11	(15)
2021−	Grenoble	47	(5)
- Correct as of 25 January 2024
Super Rugby
Years	Team	Apps	(Points)
2016–2018	Jaguares	13	(0)
2019–2020	Jaguares	12	(5)
- Correct as of 3 January 2018
International career
Years	Team	Apps	(Points)
2012−2013	Argentina Under 20	9	(15)
2014−2019	Argentina XV	18	(26)
2019−	Argentina	8	(0)
- Correct as of 18 September 2019

Felipe Ezcurra (born 15 April 1993) is an Argentine rugby union player. He plays as a scrum-half for French Pro D2 side FC Grenoble.

Born in Buenos Aires Ezcurra played for Hindú Club in the Nacional de Clubes.

He played for Pampas XV and for Argentina Jaguars. He has 2 caps for Argentina, in 2014, for the South American Rugby Championship, without scoring. He was called for the 2015 Rugby Championship, but he never played.

He signed for English side Leicester Tigers in Premiership Rugby on 30 September 2018 on a short-term contract. But did not feature on the pitch and returned to Argentina later that year.
