= Sebastián Cancelliere =

Argentine rugby union player (born 1993)

- Born: 17 September 1993 (age 33) San Jose, California, United States
- Height: 6 ft 1 in (185 cm)
- Weight: 90 kg (198 lb)

Rugby union career
- Position: Wing
Amateur team(s)
Years	Team	Apps	(Points)
2012–2021	Hindú	56	(283)
2025-	Hindú	1	(0)
Senior career
Years	Team	Apps	(Points)
2018–2020	Jaguares	24	(45)
2021	Jaguares XV	9	(70)
2021–25	Glasgow Warriors	58	(110)
International career
Years	Team	Apps	(Points)
2017	Argentina XV	8	(50)
2017–	Argentina	12	(5)
National sevens team
Years	Team		Comps
2015–2016	Argentina		3

Sebastián Cancelliere (born 17 September 1993) is an Argentina international rugby union player. He now plays for Hindú Club in Argentina, having previously played for Glasgow Warriors.

== Rugby Union career ==
=== Amateur career ===
Cancelliere learned all his rugby in Argentina; he is a product of Hindú club in Buenos Aires.

After leaving Glasgow Warriors in the summer of 2025, Cancelliere is back playing with Hindú Club.

=== Professional career ===
Earlier in 2019 Cancelliere played Super Rugby for Jaguares. He was a part of the roster which reached the 2019 Super Rugby Final.

He joined Glasgow Warriors for the 2021–22 season. He made his competitive debut for the Glasgow club playing in the United Rugby Championship against Zebre at the Stadio Sergio Lanfranchi in Parma. He became Glasgow Warrior No. 336.

He had 58 caps for the Warriors scoring 22 tries. He was voted Warrior of the Month for 3 different months: March 2022, October 2022 and January 2023. A fan favourite he was released on the new SRU Performance Director, David Nucifora, steer of signing Scottish-Qualified players.

=== International career ===
Cancelliere was born in the United States, moving to Argentina as an infant. Cancelliere was eligible to represent either the United States or Argentina at international level.

Prior to Super Rugby, Cancelliere was involved for the Argentina XV. He played at both scrum-half and wing for the national next-of-XV. He made his test debut against England in 2017. He was considered for Rugby World Cup 2019. He played in Argentina's final warm-up match against South Africa.
