= Jaguares (Super Rugby) =

- Union: Argentine Rugby Union
- Nickname: Los Jaguares
- Founded: 16 December 2015
- Disbanded: 2020; 6 years ago
- Location: Buenos Aires, Argentina
- Region: Argentina
- Ground: José Amalfitani Stadium (Capacity: 49,540)
- Most caps: Guido Petti (67)
- Top scorer: Nicolás Sánchez (392)
- League: Super Rugby (2016–2020)
- 2019: 2nd of 15 (Runners-up)
1st kit	2nd kit

Official website
- www.jaguares.com.ar

The Jaguares were an Argentine professional rugby union team based in Buenos Aires, Argentina. They were founded in 2015 and are the first Argentine team to play in SANZAAR's Super Rugby competition, participating from the 2016 Super Rugby season onwards. They were the runners up during the 2019 Super Rugby season, losing to the Crusaders 19–3 in the Super Rugby Final, played on 6 July 2019. They participated in Super Rugby until the end of the 2020 Super Rugby season, before they departed the competition having not been named in any of the regionalised formats for the 2021 Super Rugby season. With no competition in sight, players moved to different clubs in Europe and the national group disintegrated. The Jaguares disbanded permanently in December 2022 due to the expansion of Super Rugby Americas, dividing into two new teams, Dogos XV and Pampas XV.

== History ==
Following on from impressive performances by Argentina in international rugby union competitions, such as a third-placed finish in the 2007 Rugby World Cup, the governing body of rugby in Argentina, the Argentine Rugby Union (UAR), campaigned for inclusion in SANZAR's Tri Nations competition. In 2011, it was announced that the competition would be expanded to include Argentina, which resulted in the competition being rebranded as The Rugby Championship and Argentina competed in the competition for the first time in 2012.

There was still no professional league in Argentina per rules of the Argentine Rugby Union. The UAR launched a team called the Pampas XV that participated in the South African Vodacom Cup competition from 2010 to 2013, winning the competition in 2011 with an 11-match unbeaten run. The team withdrew from the competition at the end of 2013 due to financial considerations, but was relaunched to participate in the Pacific Rugby Cup from 2014 onwards. They won the competition in 2014 and 2015 (as the rebranded World Rugby Pacific Challenge).

Despite the performances of the Pampas XV, the UAR still campaigned to have teams included in the Super Rugby competition. Since SANZAR sold the existing Super Rugby package to its broadcasters for the period 2011–15, it meant that no changes to the format would be permitted until the 2016 season.

=== Super Rugby ===
In 2013, SANZAR CEO Greg Peters announced that Super Rugby would be expanded in the 2016 season, adding that the South African franchise the Southern Kings would be one of the expansion teams. In early 2014, SANZAR confirmed that Super Rugby would be increased from 15 to 18 teams starting from the 2016 season, with an Argentine team getting one of the additional spots. The team would be based in Buenos Aires and that they would participate in the South African Conference. Japan was granted the license for the 18th franchise in October 2014 and the new expanded format and three new teams were formally approved by the SANZAR Executive Committee in November 2014. In 2018 the team recorded 7 wins in a row. In 2019 the team played their first ever Super Rugby final against the Crusaders in Christchurch where the Jaguares were defeated 19-3.

=== Team results by season ===
Jaguares season by season record
Season	Pos	Finals	P	W	L	D	F	A	-/+	BP	Pts
2016	13th	—	15	4	11	0	376	427	–51	6	22
2017	10th	—	15	7	8	0	404	386	+18	5	33
2018	7th	Qualifiers	17	9	8	0	432	458	–26	2	38
2019	2nd	Runners Up	19	13	6	0	461	352	109	7	51

=== Player scoring records ===
Season	Most tries		Most points	
Season	Name	Tries	Name	Points
2016	Agustín Creevy; Martín Landajo	6	Nicolás Sánchez	142
2017	Agustín Creevy	5	Nicolás Sánchez	89
2018	Emiliano Boffelli; Bautista Delguy	10	Nicolás Sánchez	161
2019	Ramiro Moyano	7	Joaquín Díaz Bonilla	119

== Honours ==
=== Super Rugby ===
- Runners-up (1)

2019

- South African Conference winners (1)

2019

== Name and colours ==
The name was initially scheduled to be revealed at the end of July 2015, before being postponed to after the 2015 Rugby World Cup. On 16 December 2015, it was announced that the team would be known as the Jaguares. The name Jaguares was chosen to represent cunning, skill and power. According to the Jaguares official website, "Their sharp instinct and their intelligence make the Jaguares the ideal symbol for our team." The name is also a tribute to the crest of the Argentine Rugby Union, which appears on the jerseys of all Argentina national teams, and as a Spanish translation to the nation side Jaguars.

The name Jaguares is cognate with the English 'jaguars', which originates in the South American languages Tupi, Guaraní, Spanish, and Portuguese. The Spanish version yaguares or yaguaretés is always written with an initial y, and the first appearances of the word written with a j were after transliterations into English.

== Stadium ==
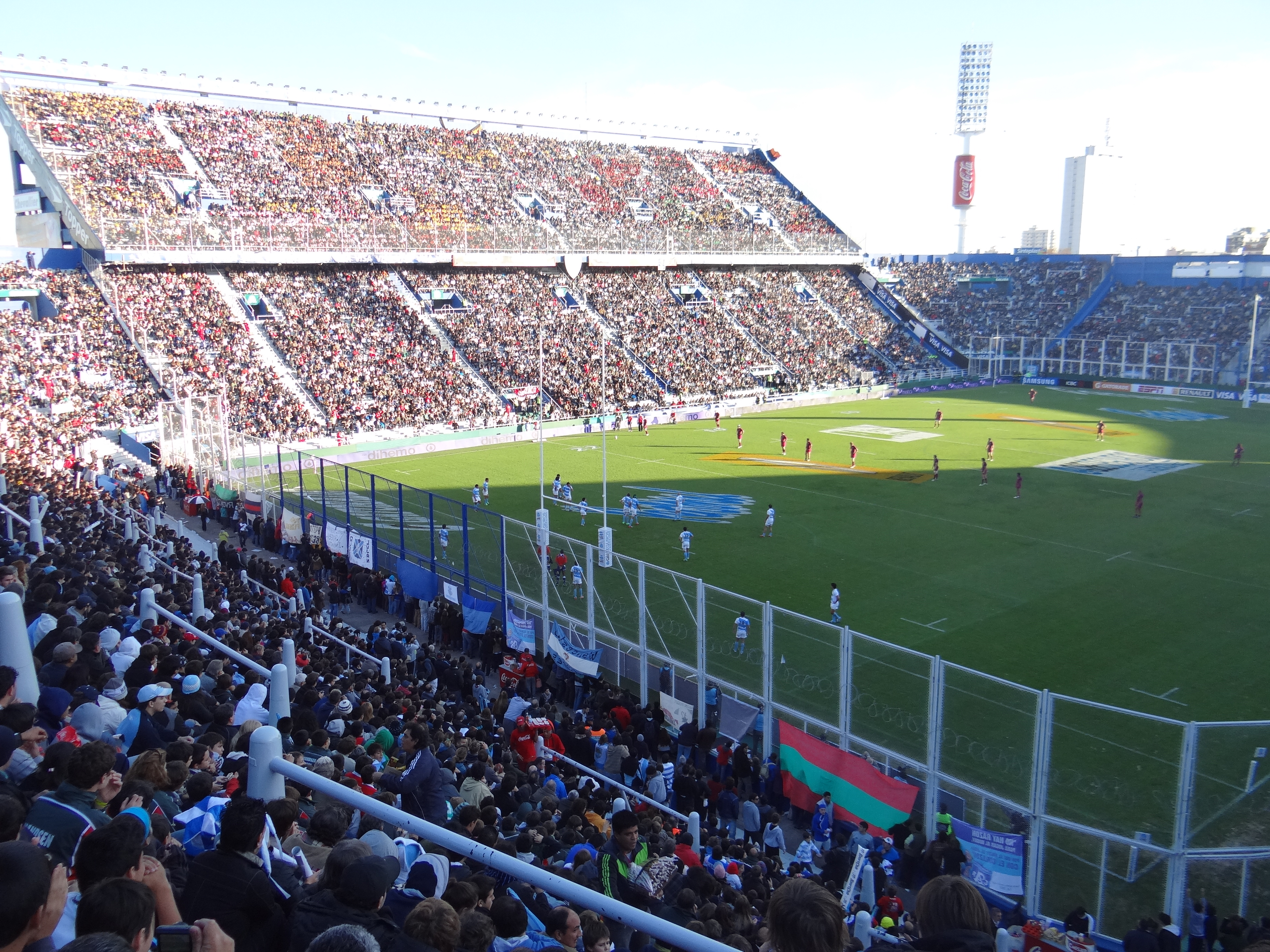
The José Amalfitani Stadium during a rugby match between Argentina 'A' and England 'A' in 2013.

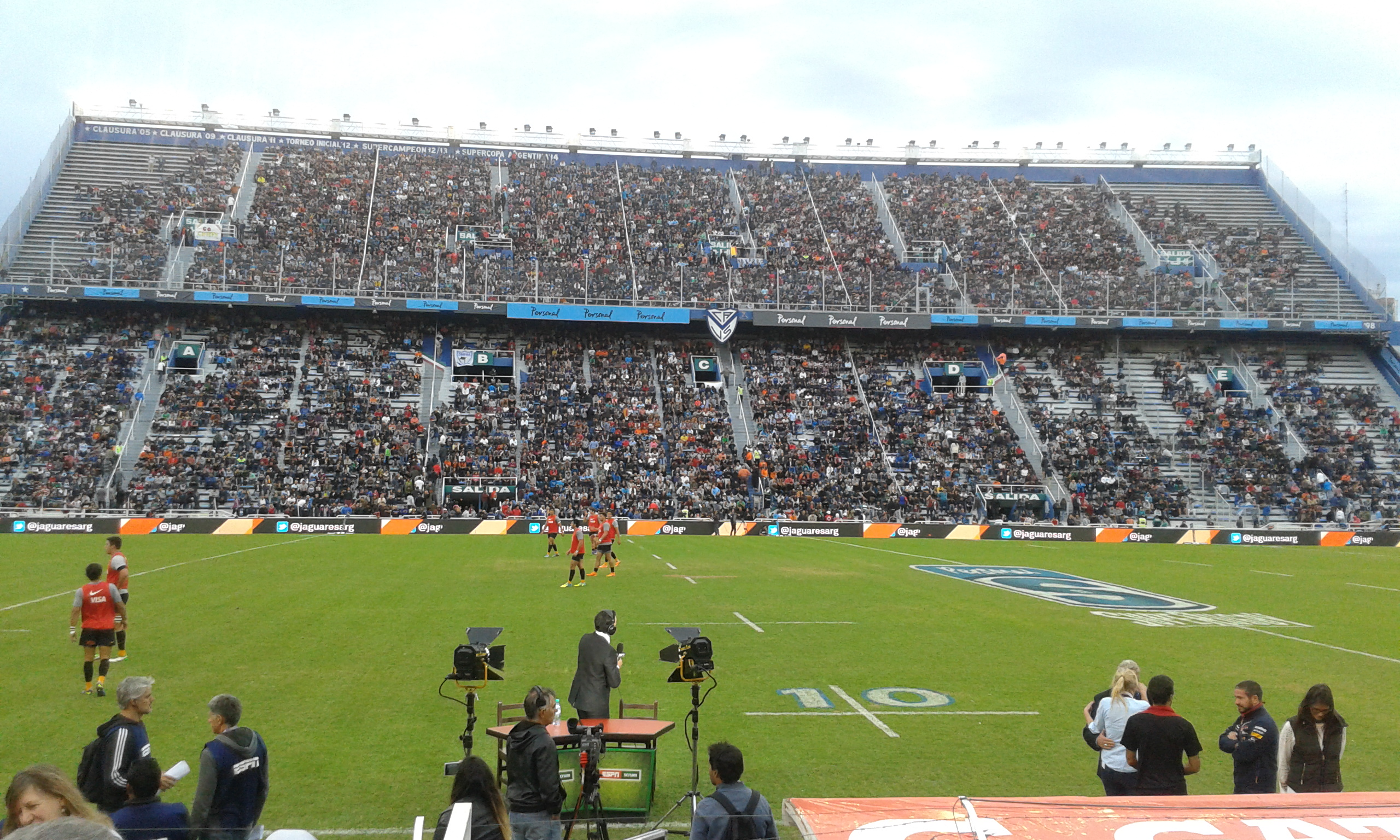
José Amalfitani Stadium during the Jaguares' home debut versus New Zealand's Chiefs (2016 Super Rugby season)

The Jaguares are based in Buenos Aires and their home ground is the 49,540-capacity José Amalfitani Stadium.

== Previous coaches ==
Since introduction in 2016
Coach	Period	G	W	L	D	%	Honours	Ref.
Raúl Pérez	2015 – 2017	30	11	19	0	36.67		
Mario Ledesma	10 October 2017 – 1 August 2018	17	9	8	0	52.94		
Gonzalo Quesada	9 August 2018 – 5 June 2020	26	16	9	1	61.54		

== Jaguares XV ==
In June 2019, it was confirmed that a Jaguares' development team called Jaguares XV would participate in the First Division of the Currie Cup, South Africa's premier domestic championship. Following the COVID-19 pandemic the 2020 Currie Cup was delayed and the first division of the competition cancelled, meaning the Jaguares XV did not compete in 2020. For the 2021 season, the Jaguares XV will compete in Súper Liga Americana de Rugby, replacing Ceibos as Argentina's franchise in the competition. On 23 January, it was confirmed that Ignacio Fernández Lobbe would coach the side in the 2021 Súper Liga Americana de Rugby season. Fernández Lobbe had previously coached Ceibos in the 2020 Súper Liga Americana de Rugby season.

On 25 December 2022, the Jaguares XV divided to multiply the base of Argentine rugby and enhance regional competition. As part of the transformations of the new Super Rugby Americas, which will replace the American Super League, the Argentine franchise was divided into Pampas, from Buenos Aires, and Dogos XV, from Córdoba. Putting a definitive end to the Jaguares franchise.

== Attendances ==
The Jaguares recorded the highest average home attendance of any Argentine rugby union club in the following seasons:

Season	League	Average attendance
2017	Super Rugby	8,989
2016	Super Rugby	12,836

=== Honours ===
- Currie Cup First Division (1)

2019

- Súper Liga Americana de Rugby (1)

2021

- Challenge Cup of the Americas (1)

2022

== See also ==
- Super Rugby
- Pampas XV
- Argentina XV, formerly known as Argentina Jaguars
