= 2018 end-of-year rugby union internationals =

International rugby union matches played between October and December 2018

The 2018 end of year rugby union tests, also referred to as the Autumn internationals in the Northern Hemisphere, were a number of rugby union test matches played during October and November, primarily involving countries from the Northern Hemisphere hosting those from the Southern Hemisphere. Also involved in matches are those from second-tier teams. These international games count towards World Rugby's ranking system, with a team typically playing from two to four matches during this period.

== Matches ==
=== 26/27 October ===
26 October 2018
19:00 JST (UTC+9)

| Japan | 28–31 | World XV |
| Try: Fukuoka 21' c Lafaele 46' c Lemeki 60' c Nakamura 74' c Con: Tamura (3/3) 22', 47', 62'; Matsuda (1/1) 74' | | Try: Cronjé 10' c Pulu 15' m Li (2) 31' m, 41' c Jenkins 39' c Con: Cronjé (3/5) 11', 40', 42' |

Hanazono Rugby Stadium, Osaka
Attendance: 16,846
Referee: Brendon Pickerill (New Zealand)

Team details

| FB | 15 | Jamie Henry | (substituted off) 69' |
| RW | 14 | Lomano Lemeki |
| OC | 13 | Will Tupou | (substituted off) 62' |
| IC | 12 | Timothy Lafaele |
| LW | 11 | Kenki Fukuoka |
| FH | 10 | Yu Tamura | (substituted off) 62' |
| SH | 9 | Yutaka Nagare | (substituted off) 53' |
| N8 | 8 | Hendrik Tui |
| OF | 7 | Shunsuke Nunomaki | (substituted off) 40' |
| BF | 6 | Michael Leitch (c) |
| RL | 5 | Samuela Anise | (substituted off) 53' |
| LL | 4 | Wimpie van der Walt | (substituted off) 69' |
| TP | 3 | Hiroshi Yamashita | (substituted off) 40' |
| HK | 2 | Yusuke Niwai | (substituted off) 40' |
| LP | 1 | Keita Inagaki | (substituted off) 62' |
Replacements:
| HK | 16 | Atsushi Sakate | (substituted on) 40' |
| PR | 17 | Koki Yamamoto | (substituted on) 62' |
| PR | 18 | Asaeli Ai Valu | (substituted on) 40' |
| LK | 19 | Uwe Helu | (substituted on) 53' |
| FL | 20 | Masakatsu Nishikawa | (substituted on) 40' |
| LK | 21 | Isileli Nakajima | (substituted on) 69' |
| SH | 22 | Fumiaki Tanaka | (substituted on) 53' |
| FH | 23 | Rikiya Matsuda | (substituted on) 62' |
| CE | 24 | Ryoto Nakamura | (substituted on) 62' |
| CE | 25 | Ryohei Yamanaka | (substituted on) 69' |
Coach:
(New Zealand) Jamie Joseph

| FB | 15 | (New Zealand) Nehe Milner-Skudder |
| RW | 14 | (Niue) Toni Pulu | (substituted off) 17' |
| OC | 13 | (South Africa) Harold Vorster |
| IC | 12 | (New Zealand) Ma'a Nonu |
| LW | 11 | (New Zealand) Tevita Li |
| FH | 10 | (South Africa) Lionel Cronjé | (substituted off) 74' |
| SH | 9 | (New Zealand) Andy Ellis (c) | (substituted off) 51' |
| N8 | 8 | (Argentina) Leonardo Senatore | (substituted off) 48' | (substituted on) 76' |
| OF | 7 | (New Zealand) Dillon Hunt | (substituted off) 74' |
| BF | 6 | (New Zealand) Jackson Hemopo |
| RL | 5 | (South Africa) Jason Jenkins |
| LL | 4 | (Australia) Sam Carter | (substituted off) 22' |
| TP | 3 | (South Africa) Hencus van Wyk | (substituted off) 48' |
| HK | 2 | (South Africa) Adriaan Strauss | (substituted off) 48' |
| LP | 1 | (New Zealand) Craig Millar | (substituted off) 40' |
Replacements:
| HK | 16 | (New Zealand) Ricky Riccitelli | (substituted on) 48' | (substituted off) 79' |
| PR | 17 | (New Zealand) Wyatt Crockett | (substituted on) 40' |
| PR | 18 | (Australia) Ben Alexander | (substituted on) 48' |
| LK | 19 | (Australia) Ben Gunter | (substituted on) 22' |
| FL | 20 | (South Africa) Willie Britz | (substituted on) 48' | (substituted off) 76' |
| SH | 21 | (New Zealand) Augustine Pulu | (substituted on) 51' |
| FH | 22 | (Argentina) Santiago González Iglesias | (substituted on) 74' |
| CE | 23 | (Japan) Keisuke Moriya | (substituted on) 17' |
| FL | 24 | (Tonga) Nili Latu | (substituted on) 74' |
| PR | 25 | (South Africa) Corné Fourie | (substituted on) 79' |
Coach:
(New Zealand) Robbie Deans

Touch judges:
Mike Fraser (New Zealand)
Damon Murphy (Australia)
Television match official:
Aaron Paterson (New Zealand)

27 October 2018
15:00 JST (UTC+9)

| New Zealand | 37–20 | Australia |
| Try: Squire 11' c Read 35' c B. Barrett 58' c B. Smith 69' m Ioane 77' m Con: B. Barrett (3/4) 12', 36', 59'; Mo'unga (0/1); Pen: B. Barrett (2/2) 24', 52' | | Try: Naivalu 38' c Folau 75' c Con: Foley (2/2) 40', 75'; Pen: Beale (1/1) 20'; Foley (1/1) 47' |

Nissan Stadium, Yokohama, Japan
Attendance: 46,143
Referee: Romain Poite (France)

Team details

| FB | 15 | Damian McKenzie | (substituted off) 67' |
| RW | 14 | Ben Smith |
| OC | 13 | Ryan Crotty | (substituted off) 60' |
| IC | 12 | Sonny Bill Williams |
| LW | 11 | Rieko Ioane |
| FH | 10 | Beauden Barrett |
| SH | 9 | TJ Perenara | (substituted off) 60' |
| N8 | 8 | Kieran Read (c) |
| OF | 7 | Ardie Savea |
| BF | 6 | Liam Squire | (substituted off) 67' |
| RL | 5 | Scott Barrett |
| LL | 4 | Sam Whitelock | (substituted off) 51' |
| TP | 3 | Owen Franks | (substituted off) 51' |
| HK | 2 | Codie Taylor | (substituted off) 70' |
| LP | 1 | Joe Moody | (substituted off) 51' |
Replacements:
| HK | 16 | Nathan Harris | (substituted on) 70' |
| PR | 17 | Karl Tu'inukuafe | (substituted on) 51' |
| PR | 18 | Nepo Laulala | (substituted on) 51' |
| LK | 19 | Brodie Retallick | (substituted on) 51' |
| FL | 20 | Matt Todd | (substituted on) 67' |
| SH | 21 | Aaron Smith | (substituted on) 60' |
| FH | 22 | Richie Mo'unga | (substituted on) 67' |
| CE | 23 | Anton Lienert-Brown | (substituted on) 60' |
Coach:
(New Zealand) Steve Hansen

| FB | 15 | Dane Haylett-Petty | | (substituted off) 71' |
| RW | 14 | Sefa Naivalu | | (substituted off) 57' |
| OC | 13 | Israel Folau |
| IC | 12 | Kurtley Beale |
| LW | 11 | Marika Koroibete | | | (substituted off) 71' | (substituted on) 76' |
| FH | 10 | Bernard Foley |
| SH | 9 | Will Genia | | (substituted off) 70' |
| N8 | 8 | David Pocock |
| OF | 7 | Michael Hooper (c) |
| BF | 6 | Ned Hanigan | | (substituted off) 51' |
| RL | 5 | Rob Simmons | | (substituted off) 65' |
| LL | 4 | Izack Rodda |
| TP | 3 | Allan Alaalatoa | | (substituted off) 53' |
| HK | 2 | Folau Fainga'a | | (substituted off) 53' | (substituted on) 71' | (substituted off) 76' |
| LP | 1 | Scott Sio | | (substituted off) 53' |
Replacements:
| HK | 16 | Tolu Latu | (yellow card) 66' to 76' | (substituted on) 53' |
| PR | 17 | Sekope Kepu | | (substituted on) 53' |
| PR | 18 | Taniela Tupou | | (substituted on) 53' |
| LK | 19 | Rory Arnold | | (substituted on) 65' |
| FL | 20 | Jack Dempsey | | (substituted on) 51' |
| SH | 21 | Nick Phipps | | (substituted on) 70' |
| CE | 22 | Samu Kerevi | | (substituted on) 57' |
| FB | 23 | Tom Banks | | (substituted on) 71' |
Coach:
(Australia) Michael Cheika

Man of the Match:
Rieko Ioane (New Zealand)

Touch judges:
Marius van der Westhuizen (South Africa)
Rasta Rasivhenge (South Africa)
Television match official:
Marius Jonker (South Africa)

Notes:

- Sonny Bill Williams (New Zealand) earned his 50th test cap.
- Sekope Kepu (Australia) became the ninth Australian to earn his 100th test cap and the first in his position for his country.
- New Zealand completed a 3-0 whitewashing of Australia for the first time since 2016.

=== 29/31 October ===
29 October 2018
19:30 GMT (UTC+0)

| Dragons (Wales) | 28–24 | Hong Kong |
| Try: Hoppe 35' c Bevington 52' c Fry 64' c Babos 71' c Con: Lloyd (4/4) 36', 53', 65', 72' | Report | Try: M. Parfitt 10' c Slatem 32' m Fenn 40' c Stone 68' m Con: Rimene (2/3) 12', 40' |

Eugene Cross Park, Ebbw Vale
Attendance: 200
Referee: Adam Jones (Wales)

31 October 2018
19:15 GMT (UTC+0)

| Oxford University RFC (England) | 20–26 | Canada |
| Try: Dix 17' c Penalty try 80'; Con: Humberstone (1/1) 18'; Pen: Humberstone (2/2) 7', 30' | Report | Try: Evans (2) 14' c, 64' m Campbell 35' c du Toit 52' c Con: O'Leary (3/4) 14', 36', 53' |

Iffley Road, Oxford
Attendance: 1,500
Referee: JP Doyle (England)

=== 2/3 November ===
3 November 2018
14:45 JST (UTC+9)

| Japan | 31–69 | New Zealand |
| Try: Anise 3' c Tui 32' c Lafaele (2) 40' m, 69' c Henry 51' m Con: Tamura (3/5) 5', 33', 70' | Report | Try: Coles 14' c Mo'unga 18' c Laumape (3) 27' c, 37' c, 62' c Tahuriorangi 34' c Bridge (2) 46' c, 66' m Naholo 56' m Proctor 59' c Con: Mo'unga (7/8) 15', 20', 28', 35', 38', 47', 60'; Barrett (1/2) 63'; Pen: Mo'unga (1/1) 2' |

Ajinomoto Stadium, Chōfu
Attendance: 43,751
Referee: Matthew Carley (England)

Team details

| FB | 15 | Ryohei Yamanaka | (substituted off) 65' |
| RW | 14 | Jamie Henry | (substituted off) 60' |
| OC | 13 | Will Tupou |
| IC | 12 | Timothy Lafaele |
| LW | 11 | Kenki Fukuoka |
| FH | 10 | Yu Tamura |
| SH | 9 | Yutaka Nagare | (substituted off) 48' |
| N8 | 8 | Hendrik Tui |
| OF | 7 | Shunsuke Nunomaki |
| BF | 6 | Michael Leitch (c) |
| RL | 5 | Samuela Anise | (substituted off) 63' |
| LL | 4 | Wimpie van der Walt | (substituted off) 48' |
| TP | 3 | Hiroshi Yamashita | (substituted off) 63' |
| HK | 2 | Atsushi Sakate | (substituted off) 63' |
| LP | 1 | Keita Inagaki | (substituted off) 63' |
Replacements:
| HK | 16 | Yusuke Niwai | (substituted on) 63' |
| PR | 17 | Masataka Mikami | (substituted on) 63' |
| PR | 18 | Asaeli Ai Valu | (substituted on) 63' |
| LK | 19 | Uwe Helu | (substituted on) 63' |
| LK | 20 | Isileli Nakajima | (substituted on) 48' |
| SH | 21 | Fumiaki Tanaka | (substituted on) 48' |
| FH | 22 | Rikiya Matsuda | (substituted on) 65' |
| CE | 23 | Ryoto Nakamura | (substituted on) 60' |
Coach:
(New Zealand) Jamie Joseph

| FB | 15 | Jordie Barrett |
| RW | 14 | Nehe Milner-Skudder | (substituted off) 40' |
| OC | 13 | Matt Proctor |
| IC | 12 | Ngani Laumape |
| LW | 11 | Waisake Naholo | (substituted off) 70' |
| FH | 10 | Richie Mo'unga |
| SH | 9 | Te Toiroa Tahuriorangi | (substituted off) 58' |
| N8 | 8 | Luke Whitelock (c) |
| OF | 7 | Dalton Papalii | (substituted off) 58' |
| BF | 6 | Vaea Fifita |
| RL | 5 | Jackson Hemopo |
| LL | 4 | Patrick Tuipulotu | (substituted off) 53' |
| TP | 3 | Angus Ta'avao | (substituted off) 58' |
| HK | 2 | Dane Coles | (substituted off) 53' |
| LP | 1 | Ofa Tu'ungafasi | (substituted off) 53' |
Replacements:
| HK | 16 | Liam Coltman | (substituted on) 53' |
| PR | 17 | Tim Perry | (substituted on) 53' |
| PR | 18 | Tyrel Lomax | (substituted on) 58' |
| FL | 19 | Dillon Hunt | (substituted on) 58' |
| FL | 20 | Gareth Evans | (substituted on) 53' |
| SH | 21 | Mitchell Drummond | (substituted on) 58' |
| FH | 22 | Brett Cameron | (substituted on) 70' |
| WG | 23 | George Bridge | (substituted on) 40' |
Coach:
(New Zealand) Steve Hansen

Man of the Match:
Ngani Laumape (New Zealand)

Touch judges:
Damon Murphy (Australia)
Graham Cooper (Australia)
Television match official:
Damien Mitchelmore (Australia)

Notes:

- Hiroshi Yamashita (Japan) earned his 50th test cap.
- Jamie Henry, Isileli Nakajima (both Japan), George Bridge, Brett Cameron, Mitchell Drummond, Gareth Evans, Dillon Hunt, Tyrel Lomax, Dalton Papalii and Matt Proctor (all New Zealand) made their international debuts.
- New Zealand gave debuts to eight players, their highest number since 1986 when 11 players debuted against France.
- Japan's 31 points was their highest score against New Zealand in a Test match, surpassing the 17 points they scored in 1995.
- The 43,751 attendance was a record for a Test match in Japan. The previous record was achieved the previous year in Japan's Test match against Australia.

3 November 2018
14:00 EET (UTC+2)

| Romania A | 36–5 | Kenya |
| Try: Melinte 2' c Pristăviță 15' m Căpățână 37' c Penalty try 40'; Dumitru 68' c Con: Melinte (2/3) 3', 37'; Plai (1/1) 70'; Pen: Plai (1/1) 20' | Report | Try: A. William 30' m |

Ghencea Sports Complex, Bucharest
Referee: Alexandru Ionescu (Romania)

3 November 2018
14:45 GMT (UTC+0)

| Wales | 21–10 | Scotland |
| Try: North 29' m J. Davies 47' c Con: Halfpenny (1/2) 48'; Pen: Halfpenny (3/3) 4', 14', 22' | Report | Try: McInally 34' c Con: Hastings (1/1) 36'; Pen: Hastings (1/1) 25' |

Millennium Stadium, Cardiff
Attendance: 63,188
Referee: Mathieu Raynal (France)

Team details

| FB | 15 | Leigh Halfpenny |
| RW | 14 | George North |
| OC | 13 | Jonathan Davies |
| IC | 12 | Hadleigh Parkes |
| LW | 11 | Luke Morgan | | (substituted off) 78' |
| FH | 10 | Gareth Anscombe | | (substituted off) 78' |
| SH | 9 | Gareth Davies | | (substituted off) 69' |
| N8 | 8 | Ross Moriarty |
| OF | 7 | Justin Tipuric |
| BF | 6 | Dan Lydiate | | | | | (substituted off) 69' |
| RL | 5 | Alun Wyn Jones (c) |
| LL | 4 | Cory Hill | | (substituted off) 64' |
| TP | 3 | Dillon Lewis | | (substituted off) 78' |
| HK | 2 | Ken Owens | | (substituted off) 40' | (substituted on) 42' | (substituted off) 62' | (substituted on) 69' |
| LP | 1 | Nicky Smith | | (substituted off) 62' |
Replacements:
| HK | 16 | Elliot Dee | (yellow card) 68' to 78' | (substituted on) 40' | (substituted off) 42' | (substituted on) 62' |
| PR | 17 | Rob Evans | | (substituted on) 62' |
| PR | 18 | Leon Brown | | (substituted on) 78' |
| LK | 19 | Adam Beard | | (substituted on) 64' |
| FL | 20 | Aaron Wainwright |
| SH | 21 | Tomos Williams | | (substituted on) 69' |
| FH | 22 | Jarrod Evans | | (substituted on) 78' |
| WG | 23 | Steff Evans | | (substituted on) 78' |
Coach:
(New Zealand) Warren Gatland

| FB | 15 | Blair Kinghorn |
| RW | 14 | Tommy Seymour | (substituted off) 73' |
| OC | 13 | Huw Jones | (substituted off) 62' |
| IC | 12 | Alex Dunbar |
| LW | 11 | Lee Jones |
| FH | 10 | Adam Hastings |
| SH | 9 | Ali Price | (substituted off) 62' |
| N8 | 8 | Ryan Wilson |
| OF | 7 | Hamish Watson |
| BF | 6 | Jamie Ritchie | (substituted off) 62' |
| RL | 5 | Jonny Gray | (substituted off) 69' |
| LL | 4 | Ben Toolis |
| TP | 3 | WP Nel | (substituted off) 54' |
| HK | 2 | Stuart McInally (c) | (substituted off) 54' |
| LP | 1 | Allan Dell | (substituted off) 54' |
Replacements:
| HK | 16 | Fraser Brown | (substituted on) 54' |
| PR | 17 | Alex Allan | (substituted on) 54' |
| PR | 18 | Simon Berghan | (substituted on) 54' |
| LK | 19 | Grant Gilchrist | (substituted on) 69' |
| FL | 20 | Matt Fagerson | (substituted on) 62' |
| SH | 21 | George Horne | (substituted on) 62' |
| CE | 22 | Peter Horne | (substituted on) 62' |
| WG | 23 | Darcy Graham | (substituted on) 73' |
Coach:
(Scotland) Gregor Townsend

Man of the Match:
Justin Tipuric (Wales)

Touch judges:
Wayne Barnes (England)
Frank Murphy (Ireland)
Television match official:
Rowan Kitt (England)

Notes:

- Jarrod Evans, Luke Morgan (both Wales) and Darcy Graham (Scotland) made their international debuts.
- Wales won the first ever contest of the Doddie Weir Cup.
- Wales won their opening 'Autumn Internationals' match for the first time since beating Romania 40–3 in 2002, and they gained their first opening win at the Millennium Stadium since beating Samoa 50–6 in 2000.

3 November 2018
15:00 GMT (UTC+0)

| England | 12–11 | South Africa |
| Pen: Farrell (3/4) 20', 36', 72'; Daly (1/1) 50' | Report | Try: Nkosi 32' m Pen: Pollard (2/3) 6', 67' |

Twickenham Stadium, London
Attendance: 80,369
Referee: Angus Gardner (Australia)

Team details

| FB | 15 | Elliot Daly |
| RW | 14 | Jack Nowell | | (substituted off) 64' |
| OC | 13 | Henry Slade |
| IC | 12 | Ben Te'o | | (substituted off) 72' |
| LW | 11 | Jonny May |
| FH | 10 | Owen Farrell (c) |
| SH | 9 | Ben Youngs | | (substituted off) 64' |
| N8 | 8 | Mark Wilson |
| OF | 7 | Tom Curry | | (substituted off) 41' |
| BF | 6 | Brad Shields | | (substituted off) 76' |
| RL | 5 | George Kruis |
| LL | 4 | Maro Itoje | (yellow card) 15' to 25' |
| TP | 3 | Kyle Sinckler | | (substituted off) 64' |
| HK | 2 | Dylan Hartley (c) | | (substituted off) 56' |
| LP | 1 | Alec Hepburn | | (substituted off) 41' |
Replacements:
| HK | 16 | Jamie George | | (substituted on) 56' |
| PR | 17 | Ben Moon | | (substituted on) 41' |
| PR | 18 | Harry Williams | | (substituted on) 64' |
| LK | 19 | Charlie Ewels | | (substituted on) 76' |
| FL | 20 | Zach Mercer | | (substituted on) 41' |
| SH | 21 | Danny Care | | (substituted on) 64' |
| FH | 22 | George Ford | | (substituted on) 72' |
| WG | 23 | Chris Ashton | | (substituted on) 64' |
Coach:
(Australia) Eddie Jones

| FB | 15 | Damian Willemse | (substituted off) 74' |
| RW | 14 | S'busiso Nkosi | (substituted off) 59' |
| OC | 13 | Jesse Kriel |
| IC | 12 | Damian de Allende |
| LW | 11 | Aphiwe Dyantyi |
| FH | 10 | Handré Pollard |
| SH | 9 | Ivan van Zyl | (substituted off) 74' |
| N8 | 8 | Warren Whiteley |
| OF | 7 | Duane Vermeulen |
| BF | 6 | Siya Kolisi (c) | (substituted off) 64' |
| RL | 5 | Pieter-Steph du Toit |
| LL | 4 | Eben Etzebeth | (substituted off) 41' |
| TP | 3 | Frans Malherbe | (substituted off) 64' |
| HK | 2 | Malcolm Marx | (substituted off) 73' |
| LP | 1 | Steven Kitshoff | (substituted off) 64' |
Replacements:
| HK | 16 | Bongi Mbonambi | (substituted on) 73' |
| PR | 17 | Thomas du Toit | (substituted on) 64' |
| PR | 18 | Wilco Louw | (substituted on) 64' |
| LK | 19 | RG Snyman | (substituted on) 41' |
| LK | 20 | Lood de Jager | (substituted on) 64' |
| SH | 21 | Embrose Papier | (substituted on) 74' |
| FH | 22 | Elton Jantjies | (substituted on) 74' |
| CE | 23 | André Esterhuizen | (substituted on) 59' |
Coach:
(South Africa) Rassie Erasmus

Man of the Match:
Mark Wilson (England)

Touch judges:
Jérôme Garcès (France)
Ben Whitehouse (Wales)
Television match official:
Olly Hodges (Ireland)

Notes:

- Zach Mercer and Ben Moon (both England) made their international debuts.
- With this win and the 25–10 victory in June 2018, England won back-to-back matches against South Africa for the first time since their November 2004 and 2006 victories.

3 November 2018
15:00 CDT (UTC-05)

| Ireland | 54–7 | Italy |
| Try: Beirne (2) 4' c, 42' c L. McGrath 32' c Larmour (3) 45' c, 63' c, 80' m Cronin 55' c Ringrose 65' c Con: Carbery (5/5) 5', 33', 43', 46', 57'; Byrne (2/3) 64', 67' | Report | Try: Campagnaro 38' c Con: Canna (1/1) 40' |

Soldier Field, Chicago
Attendance: 35,081
Referee: Nigel Owens (Wales)

Team details

| FB | 15 | Jordan Larmour |
| RW | 14 | Andrew Conway |
| OC | 13 | Garry Ringrose |
| IC | 12 | Bundee Aki |
| LW | 11 | Jacob Stockdale | (substituted off) 60' |
| FH | 10 | Joey Carbery | (substituted off) 60' |
| SH | 9 | Luke McGrath | (substituted off) 64' |
| N8 | 8 | Jack Conan |
| OF | 7 | Josh van der Flier | (substituted off) 67' |
| BF | 6 | Rhys Ruddock (c) |
| RL | 5 | Quinn Roux |
| LL | 4 | Tadhg Beirne | (substituted off) 60' |
| TP | 3 | Andrew Porter | (substituted off) 57' |
| HK | 2 | Niall Scannell | (substituted off) 40' |
| LP | 1 | Jack McGrath | (substituted off) 50' |
Replacements:
| HK | 16 | Seán Cronin | (substituted on) 40' |
| PR | 17 | Dave Kilcoyne | (substituted on) 50' |
| PR | 18 | Finlay Bealham | (substituted on) 57' |
| LK | 19 | Devin Toner | (substituted on) 60' |
| FL | 20 | Jordi Murphy | (substituted on) 67' |
| SH | 21 | John Cooney | (substituted on) 64' |
| FH | 22 | Ross Byrne | (substituted on) 60' |
| CE | 23 | Will Addison | (substituted on) 60' |
Coach:
(New Zealand) Joe Schmidt

| FB | 15 | Luca Sperandio |
| RW | 14 | Mattia Bellini |
| OC | 13 | Michele Campagnaro (c) |
| IC | 12 | Luca Morisi | (substituted off) 69' |
| LW | 11 | Giulio Bisegni |
| FH | 10 | Carlo Canna | (substituted off) 60' |
| SH | 9 | Tito Tebaldi |
| N8 | 8 | Renato Giammarioli | (substituted off) 55' |
| OF | 7 | Braam Steyn |
| BF | 6 | Johan Meyer |
| RL | 5 | George Biagi | (substituted off) 55' |
| LL | 4 | Marco Fuser | (substituted off) 63' |
| TP | 3 | Tiziano Pasquali | (substituted off) 60' |
| HK | 2 | Luca Bigi | (substituted off) 63' |
| LP | 1 | Nicola Quaglio | (substituted off) 21' |
Replacements:
| HK | 16 | Oliviero Fabiani | (substituted on) 63' |
| PR | 17 | Cherif Traorè | (substituted on) 21' |
| PR | 18 | Giosuè Zilocchi | (substituted on) 60' |
| LK | 19 | Marco Lazzaroni | (substituted on) 63' |
| LK | 20 | Federico Ruzza | (substituted on) 55' |
| FL | 21 | Jimmy Tuivaiti | (substituted on) 55' |
| SH | 22 | Guglielmo Palazzani | (substituted on) 69' |
| FH | 23 | Ian McKinley | (substituted on) 60' |
Coach:
(Ireland) Conor O'Shea

Man of the Match:
Jordan Larmour (Ireland)

Touch judges:
Romain Poite (France)
Alexandre Ruiz (France)
Television match official:
David Ardrey (United States)

Notes:

- Ross Byrne, Will Addison (both Ireland), Jimmy Tuivaiti and Johan Meyer (both Italy) made their international debuts.

3 November 2018
17:15 CDT (UTC-05)

| United States | 22–59 | Māori All Blacks |
| Try: Matyas 37' m Maupin 59' c Dolan 70' c Con: Hooley (2/2) 60', 71'; Pen: Hooley (1/1) 14' | | Try: Ware 4' c Karpik 16' m Dixon 22' c May 25' c Walker-Leawere (2) 41' m, 46' c Thompson 55' c Lowe 74' c Stevenson 76' c Con: Black (5/7) 5', 23', 26', 47', 56'; Ioane (2/2) 74', 77' |

Soldier Field, Chicago
Attendance: 30,051
Referee: Karl Dickson (England)

=== 6 November ===
6 November 2018
19:05 GMT (UTC+0)

| Cardiff Blues (Wales) | 45–21 | Uruguay |
| Try: Lawrence 7' c Llewellyn 15' m E. Lewis 43' m I. Davies 49' c Millard 57' c Gill 71' c Penalty try 80'; Con: Morgan (4/6) 8', 50', 58', 72' | Report | Try: Dotti 5' c Berchesi 61' c Gattas 63' c Con: Favaro (1/1) 6'; Berchesi (2/2) 62', 64' |

Cardiff Arms Park, Cardiff
Attendance: 2,118
Referee: Adam Jones (Wales)

Team details

| FB | 15 | (Wales) Matthew Morgan |
| RW | 14 | (Wales) Aled Summerhill | (yellow card) 27' to 37' | (substituted off) 48' |
| OC | 13 | (Wales) Harri Millard |
| IC | 12 | (Wales) Max Llewellyn | | (substituted off) 59' |
| LW | 11 | (Wales) Cameron Lewis | | (substituted off) 64' |
| FH | 10 | (Wales) Dan Fish (c) |
| SH | 9 | (Wales) Lewis Jones | | (substituted off) 69' |
| N8 | 8 | (Wales) Alun Lawrence |
| OF | 7 | (Wales) Sion Bennett |
| BF | 6 | (Wales) Shane Lewis-Hughes | | (substituted off) 59' |
| RL | 5 | (Wales) Rory Thornton | | (substituted off) 44' |
| LL | 4 | (Wales) James Down |
| TP | 3 | (Wales) Keiron Assiratti | | (substituted off) 40' |
| HK | 2 | (Wales) Liam Belcher | | (substituted off) 40' | (substituted on) 65' |
| LP | 1 | (Wales) Rhys Carre | | (substituted off) 59' |
Replacements:
| HK | 16 | (Wales) Ethan Lewis | | (substituted on) 40' | (substituted off) 65' |
| PR | 17 | (Wales) Rhys Gill | | (substituted on) 59' |
| PR | 18 | (Wales) Will Davies-King | | (substituted on) 40' |
| LK | 19 | (England) Miles Normandale | | (substituted on) 44' |
| FL | 20 | (Wales) Ioan Rhys Davies | | (substituted on) 59' |
| SH | 21 | (Wales) Jamie Hill | | (substituted on) 69' |
| FH | 22 | (Wales) Ben Thomas | | (substituted on) 59' |
| FB | 23 | (Wales) Ioan Davies | | (substituted on) 48' |
| CE | 24 | (Wales) Peter Lloyd | | (substituted on) 64' |
Coach:
(Australia) John Mulvihill

| FB | 15 | Gastón Mieres |
| RW | 14 | Leandro Leivas |
| OC | 13 | Juan Manuel Cat | | | (substituted off) 69' |
| IC | 12 | Agustín Della Corte | | (substituted off) 40' | (substituted on) 69' |
| LW | 11 | Federico Favaro |
| FH | 10 | Rodrigo Silva | (yellow card) 48' to 58' | (substituted off) 58' |
| SH | 9 | Santiago Arata | | (substituted off) 59' |
| N8 | 8 | Manuel Diana |
| OF | 7 | Leandro Segredo | | (substituted off) 40' |
| BF | 6 | Juan Manuel Gaminara (c) | | (substituted off) 59' |
| RL | 5 | Manuel Leindekar | (yellow card) 76' |
| LL | 4 | Ignacio Dotti | | (substituted off) 59' |
| TP | 3 | Juan Echeverriá | | (substituted off) 50' |
| HK | 2 | Germán Kessler | | (substituted off) 59' |
| LP | 1 | Matías Benítez | | (substituted off) 40' |
Replacements:
| HK | 16 | Facundo Gattas | | (substituted on) 59' |
| PR | 17 | Mateo Sanguinetti | | (substituted on) 40' |
| PR | 18 | Juan Rombys | | (substituted on) 50' |
| HK | 19 | Manuel Ardao | | (substituted on) 59' |
| LK | 20 | Diego Magno | | (substituted on) 59' |
| FL | 21 | Juan Diego Ormaechea | | (substituted on) 40' |
| SH | 22 | Tomás Inciarte | | (substituted on) 59' |
| CE | 23 | Andrés Vilaseca | | (substituted on) 40' |
| FH | 24 | Felipe Berchesi | | (substituted on) 58' |
Coach:
(Uruguay) Esteban Meneses

Man of the Match:
(Wales) Dan Fish (Cardiff Blues)

Touch judges:
Gwyn Morris (Wales)
Richard Brace (Wales)
Television match official:
Sean Brickell (Wales)

=== 6–10 November ===
9 November 2018
19:30 WET (UTC+0)

| Ulster (Ireland) | 21–5 | Uruguay |
| Try: McBurney (2) 13' c, 17' c M. Rea 54' c Con: McPhillips (3/3) 14', 18', 55' | Report | Try: Mieres 71' m |

Kingspan Stadium, Belfast
Referee: Robert O'Sullivan (Ireland)

Team details

| FB | 15 | (Ireland) Bruce Houston |
| RW | 14 | (Ireland) Iwan Hughes |
| OC | 13 | (Ireland) Stewart Moore |
| IC | 12 | (Ireland) James Hume |
| LW | 11 | (Ireland) Angus Kernohan |
| FH | 10 | (Ireland) Johnny McPhillips |
| SH | 9 | (Ireland) Johnny Stewart |
| N8 | 8 | (Ireland) Greg Jones |
| OF | 7 | (Ireland) Marcus Rea |
| BF | 6 | (Ireland) Joe Dunleavy |
| RL | 5 | (Ireland) Alex Thompson |
| LL | 4 | (Ireland) Matthew Rea |
| TP | 3 | (Ireland) Tom O'Toole |
| HK | 2 | (Ireland) Adam McBurney (c) | (yellow card) 34' to 44' |
| LP | 1 | (South Africa) Schalk van der Merwe |
Replacements:
| HK | 16 | (Ireland) Zack McCall |
| PR | 17 | (Ireland) Corrie Barrett |
| PR | 18 | (Ireland) Peter Cooper |
| LK | 19 | (Ireland) JJ McKee |
| FL | 20 | (Ireland) David McCann |
| CE | 21 | (Ireland) Ben McCaughey |
| SH | 22 | (Ireland) Graham Curtis |
| FH | 23 | (Ireland) Michael Stronge |
| WG | 24 | (Ireland) Clayton Milligan |
Coach:
(England) Dan McFarland

| FB | 15 | Rodrigo Silva |
| RW | 14 | Leandro Leivas |
| OC | 13 | Juan Manuel Cat |
| IC | 12 | Andrés Vilaseca |
| LW | 11 | Gastón Mieres |
| FH | 10 | Felipe Berchesi |
| SH | 9 | Santiago Arata |
| N8 | 8 | Alejandro Nieto |
| OF | 7 | Juan Diego Ormaechea |
| BF | 6 | Juan Manuel Gaminara (c) |
| RL | 5 | Diego Magno |
| LL | 4 | Ignacio Dotti | (yellow card) 51' to 61' |
| TP | 3 | Juan Rombys |
| HK | 2 | Germán Kessler |
| LP | 1 | Mateo Sanguinetti |
Replacements:
| HK | 16 | Manuel Ardao |
| PR | 17 | Matías Benítez |
| PR | 18 | Juan Echeverriá |
| HK | 19 | Manuel Leindekar |
| FL | 20 | Manuel Diana |
| FL | 21 | Leandro Segredo |
| SH | 22 | Tomás Inciarte |
| CE | 23 | Agustín Della Corte |
| WG | 24 | Federico Favaro |
Coach:
(Uruguay) Esteban Meneses

Man of the Match:
(Ireland) Tom O'Toole (Ulster)

Touch judges:
Jonny Erskine (Ireland)
Chris Busby (Ireland)

10 November 2018
14:00 MSK (UTC+3)

| Russia | 47–20 | Namibia |
| Try: Sel`skiy 6' c Ostrikov 34' c Simplikevich 36' m Ostroushko 42' c Artemyev 45' c Sychev 57' c Dorofeev 70' c Con: Kushnarev (6/7) 7', 35', 43', 47', 58', 71' | | Try: Kisting 53' c de la Harpe 75' c Con: Stevens (2/2) 54', 75'; Pen: Loubser (2/2) 9', 23' |

Kuban Stadium, Krasnodar
Referee: Rasta Rasivhenge (South Africa)

Notes:

- Roman Khodin, Dmitry Perov, Daniil Potikhanov (all Russia), Janry du Toit, Prince ǃGaoseb and Adriaan Ludick (all Namibia) made their international debuts.
- Yuri Kushnarev became the first Russian player to earn 100 caps.
- Evgeny Matveev (Russia) earned his 50th test cap.
- This was the first meeting between the two nations hosted by Russia.

10 November 2018
15:00 CET (UTC+1)

| Italy | 28–17 | Georgia |
| Try: Campagnaro 19' c Bellini 38' m Budd 43' m Allan 56'; Con: Allan (1/4) 21'; Pen: Allan (2/2) 9', 36' | | Try: Mchedlidze 15' c Penalty try 62'; Con: Matiashvili (1/1) 16'; Pen: Matiashvili (1/2) 52' |

Stadio Artemio Franchi, Florence
Attendance: 18,424
Referee: Glen Jackson (New Zealand)

Team details

| FB | 15 | Luca Sperandio |
| RW | 14 | Tommaso Benvenuti | (yellow card) 62' to 72' |
| OC | 13 | Michele Campagnaro |
| IC | 12 | Tommaso Castello | | (substituted off) 58' |
| LW | 11 | Mattia Bellini |
| FH | 10 | Tommaso Allan | | (substituted off) 75' |
| SH | 9 | Tito Tebaldi | | (substituted off) 71' |
| N8 | 8 | Braam Steyn |
| OF | 7 | Jake Polledri |
| BF | 6 | Sebastian Negri | | (substituted off) 63' |
| RL | 5 | Dean Budd |
| LL | 4 | Alessandro Zanni | | (substituted off) 61' |
| TP | 3 | Simone Ferrari | | (substituted off) 55' |
| HK | 2 | Leonardo Ghiraldini (c) | | (substituted off) 71' |
| LP | 1 | Andrea Lovotti | | (substituted off) 71' |
Replacements:
| HK | 16 | Luca Bigi | | (substituted on) 71' |
| PR | 17 | Cherif Traorè | | (substituted on) 71' |
| PR | 18 | Tiziano Pasquali | | (substituted on) 55' |
| LK | 19 | Marco Fuser | | (substituted on) 61' |
| FL | 20 | Johan Meyer | | (substituted on) 63' |
| SH | 21 | Guglielmo Palazzani | | (substituted on) 71' |
| FH | 22 | Carlo Canna | | (substituted on) 75' |
| CE | 23 | Luca Morisi | | (substituted on) 58' |
Coach:
(Ireland) Conor O'Shea

| FB | 15 | Soso Matiashvili | | (substituted off) 76' |
| RW | 14 | Giorgi Koshadze | | (substituted off) 41' |
| OC | 13 | Merab Sharikadze (c) |
| IC | 12 | Tamaz Mchedlidze |
| LW | 11 | Zurab Dzneladze |
| FH | 10 | Lasha Khmaladze |
| SH | 9 | Vasil Lobzhanidze | | (substituted off) 58' |
| N8 | 8 | Beka Gorgadze |
| OF | 7 | Giorgi Tsutskiridze | (yellow card) 27' to 37' |
| BF | 6 | Otar Giorgadze | | (substituted off) 55' |
| RL | 5 | Lasha Lomidze |
| LL | 4 | Nodar Tcheishvili | | (substituted off) 65' |
| TP | 3 | Davit Kubriashvili | | (substituted off) 47' |
| HK | 2 | Jaba Bregvadze | | (substituted off) 58' |
| LP | 1 | Mikheil Nariashvili | | (substituted off) 58' |
Replacements:
| HK | 16 | Shalva Mamukashvili | | (substituted on) 58' |
| PR | 17 | Zurab Zhvania | | (substituted on) 58' |
| PR | 18 | Levan Chilachava | | (substituted on) 47' |
| LK | 19 | Shalva Sutiashvili | | (substituted on) 65' |
| N8 | 20 | Beka Bitsadze | | (substituted on) 55' |
| SH | 21 | Gela Aprasidze | | (substituted on) 58' |
| CE | 22 | Lasha Malaguradze | | (substituted on) 76' |
| CE | 23 | Giorgi Kveseladze | | (substituted on) 41' |
Coach:
(New Zealand) Milton Haig

Man of the Match:
Braam Steyn (Italy)

Touch judges:
Frank Murphy (Ireland)
Shuhei Kubo (Japan)
Television match official:
Graham Hughes (England)

Notes:

- This was the first meeting between the two nations since 2003.
- Zurab Dzneladze (Georgia) made his international debut.

10 November 2018
14:30 GMT (UTC+0)

| Scotland | 54–17 | Fiji |
| Try: Dell 11' c Brown 17' c Seymour (3) 40' c, 55' c, 61' m Maitland 41' c Ritchie 76' c Hastings 79' c Con: Laidlaw (5/5) 12', 29', 40', 43', 56'; Russell (2/2) 77', 80' | Report | Try: Mata 21' c Radradra 27' c Con: Volavola (2/2) 22', 28'; Pen: Volavola (1/3) 2' |

Murrayfield Stadium, Edinburgh
Attendance: 67,144
Referee: Andrew Brace (Ireland)

Team details

| FB | 15 | Stuart Hogg |
| RW | 14 | Tommy Seymour |
| OC | 13 | Alex Dunbar | (substituted off) 48' |
| IC | 12 | Peter Horne | (substituted off) 70' |
| LW | 11 | Sean Maitland |
| FH | 10 | Finn Russell |
| SH | 9 | Greig Laidlaw (c) | (substituted off) 60' |
| N8 | 8 | Matt Fagerson | (substituted off) 28' |
| OF | 7 | Jamie Ritchie |
| BF | 6 | Ryan Wilson | (substituted off) 60' |
| RL | 5 | Grant Gilchrist |
| LL | 4 | Sam Skinner |
| TP | 3 | WP Nel | (substituted off) 54' |
| HK | 2 | Fraser Brown | (substituted off) 51' |
| LP | 1 | Allan Dell | (substituted off) 54' |
Replacements:
| HK | 16 | Stuart McInally | (substituted on) 51' |
| PR | 17 | Alex Allan | (substituted on) 54' |
| PR | 18 | Simon Berghan | (substituted on) 54' |
| LK | 19 | Jonny Gray | (substituted on) 60' |
| N8 | 20 | Josh Strauss | (substituted on) 28' |
| SH | 21 | George Horne | (substituted on) 60' |
| FH | 22 | Adam Hastings | (substituted on) 70' |
| CE | 23 | Chris Harris | (substituted on) 48' |
Coach:
(Scotland) Gregor Townsend

| FB | 15 | Setariki Tuicuvu | | (substituted off) 23' |
| RW | 14 | Metuisela Talebula | | (substituted off) 62' |
| OC | 13 | Semi Radradra |
| IC | 12 | Jale Vatubua |
| LW | 11 | Vereniki Goneva |
| FH | 10 | Ben Volavola |
| SH | 9 | Frank Lomani | | (substituted off) 60' |
| N8 | 8 | Viliame Mata |
| OF | 7 | Peceli Yato | | (substituted off) 62' |
| BF | 6 | Dominiko Waqaniburotu (c) |
| RL | 5 | Leone Nakarawa | (yellow card) 38' to 48' |
| LL | 4 | Tevita Cavubati | (yellow card) 32' to 42' | (substituted off) 67' |
| TP | 3 | Manasa Saulo | | (substituted off) 49' |
| HK | 2 | Sam Matavesi | | (substituted off) 59' |
| LP | 1 | Campese Ma'afu | | (substituted off) 57' |
Replacements:
| HK | 16 | Mesulame Dolokoto | | (substituted on) 59' |
| PR | 17 | Eroni Mawi | | (substituted on) 57' |
| PR | 18 | Kalivati Tawake | | (substituted on) 49' |
| LK | 19 | Albert Tuisue | | (substituted on) 67' |
| FL | 20 | Semi Kunatani | | (substituted on) 62' |
| SH | 21 | Henry Seniloli | | (substituted on) 60' |
| FH | 22 | Alivereti Veitokani | | (substituted on) 62' |
| CE | 23 | Eroni Vasiteri | | (substituted on) 23' |
Coach:
(New Zealand) John McKee

Man of the Match:
Sam Skinner (Scotland)

Touch judges:
Luke Pearce (England)
Karl Dickson England)
Television match official:
Ben Skeen (New Zealand)

Notes:

- Sam Skinner (Scotland), Mesulame Dolokoto and Setariki Tuicuvu (both Fiji) made their international debuts.

10 November 2018
15:00 GMT (UTC+0)

| England | 15–16 | New Zealand |
| Try: Ashton 1' m Hartley 23' c Con: Farrell (1/2) 24'; Drop: Farrell (1/1) 9' | Report | Try: McKenzie 38' c Con: B. Barrett (1/1) 38'; Pen: B. Barrett (2/2) 40', 59'; Drop: B. Barrett (1/1) 45' |

Twickenham Stadium, London
Attendance: 82,149
Referee: Jérôme Garcès (France)

Team details

| FB | 15 | Elliot Daly |
| RW | 14 | Chris Ashton | (substituted off) 67' |
| OC | 13 | Henry Slade |
| IC | 12 | Ben Te'o | (substituted off) 71' |
| LW | 11 | Jonny May |
| FH | 10 | Owen Farrell (c) |
| SH | 9 | Ben Youngs | (substituted off) 62' |
| N8 | 8 | Mark Wilson |
| OF | 7 | Sam Underhill |
| BF | 6 | Brad Shields | (substituted off) 26' | (substituted on) 40' | (substituted off) 64' |
| RL | 5 | George Kruis | (substituted off) 65' |
| LL | 4 | Maro Itoje |
| TP | 3 | Kyle Sinckler | (substituted off) 57' |
| HK | 2 | Dylan Hartley (c) | (substituted off) 40' |
| LP | 1 | Ben Moon | (substituted off) 57' |
Replacements:
| HK | 16 | Jamie George | (substituted on) 40' |
| PR | 17 | Alec Hepburn | (substituted on) 57' |
| PR | 18 | Harry Williams | (substituted on) 57' |
| LK | 19 | Charlie Ewels | (substituted on) 65' |
| LK | 20 | Courtney Lawes | (substituted on) 26' | (substituted off) 40' | (substituted on) 64' |
| SH | 21 | Danny Care | (substituted on) 62' |
| FH | 22 | George Ford | (substituted on) 71' |
| WG | 23 | Jack Nowell | (substituted on) 67' |
Coach:
(Australia) Eddie Jones

| FB | 15 | Damian McKenzie | (substituted off) 62' |
| RW | 14 | Ben Smith |
| OC | 13 | Jack Goodhue |
| IC | 12 | Sonny Bill Williams | (substituted off) 30' |
| LW | 11 | Rieko Ioane |
| FH | 10 | Beauden Barrett |
| SH | 9 | Aaron Smith | (substituted off) 62' |
| N8 | 8 | Kieran Read (c) |
| OF | 7 | Ardie Savea | (substituted off) 67' |
| BF | 6 | Liam Squire | (substituted off) 51' |
| RL | 5 | Brodie Retallick |
| LL | 4 | Sam Whitelock |
| TP | 3 | Owen Franks | (substituted off) 43' |
| HK | 2 | Codie Taylor | (substituted off) 43' |
| LP | 1 | Karl Tu'inukuafe | (substituted off) 56' |
Replacements:
| HK | 16 | Dane Coles | (substituted on) 43' |
| PR | 17 | Ofa Tu'ungafasi | (substituted on) 56' |
| PR | 18 | Nepo Laulala | (substituted on) 43' |
| LK | 19 | Scott Barrett | (substituted on) 51' |
| FL | 20 | Matt Todd | (substituted on) 67' |
| SH | 21 | TJ Perenara | (substituted on) 62' |
| FH | 22 | Richie Mo'unga | (substituted on) 62' |
| CE | 23 | Ryan Crotty | (substituted on) 30' |
Coach:
(New Zealand) Steve Hansen

Man of the Match:
Brodie Retallick (New Zealand)

Touch judges:
Jaco Peyper (South Africa)
Marius Mitrea (Italy)
Television match official:
Marius Jonker (South Africa)

Notes:

- New Zealand retained the Hillary Shield.

10 November 2018
16:00 CET (UTC+1)

| French Barbarians (France) | 38–49 | Tonga |
| Try: Daubagna 33' c Ntamack 51' c Barassi 61' c Laveau 65' m Reilhac 68' m Laporte 76' c Con: Carbonel (2/2) 34', 52'; Ntamack (1/3) 61'; Balès (1/1) 77' | | Try: Fisi'ihoi 3' c Takulua (2) 14' c, 47' c Vailanu 27' c Taufa 40' c Fosita 53' c Lilo 58' c Con: Takulua (7/7) 4', 15', 28', 40', 48', 55', 59' |

Stade Chaban Delmas, Bordeaux
Referee: Dan Jones (Wales)

Team details

| FB | 15 | (France) Kylan Hamdaoui | | (substituted off) 55' |
| RW | 14 | (France) Clément Laporte |
| OC | 13 | (France) Pierre-Louis Barassi |
| IC | 12 | (France) Romain Ntamack |
| LW | 11 | (France) Martin Laveau |
| FH | 10 | (France) Louis Carbonel | | (substituted off) 55' |
| SH | 9 | (France) Thibault Daubagna | | (substituted off) 50' |
| N8 | 8 | (France) Jordan Joseph |
| OF | 7 | (France) Patrick Sobela | | (substituted off) 55' |
| BF | 6 | (France) Dylan Cretin |
| RL | 5 | (France) Thomas Jolmes |
| LL | 4 | (France) Swan Rebbadj | (yellow card) 43' to 53' | (substituted off) 55' |
| TP | 3 | (France) Antoine Guillamon | | (substituted off) 44' |
| HK | 2 | (France) Adrien Pélissié (c) | | (substituted off) 5' |
| LP | 1 | (France) Quentin Béthune | | (substituted off) 66' |
Replacements:
| HK | 16 | (France) Teddy Baubigny | | (substituted on) 5' |
| PR | 17 | (France) Jean-Baptiste Gros | | (substituted on) 66' |
| PR | 18 | (France) Malik Hamadache | | (substituted on) 44' |
| LK | 19 | (France) Boris Palu | | (substituted on) 55' |
| FL | 20 | (France) Loïc Godener | | (substituted on) 55' |
| SH | 21 | (France) Alexi Balès | | (substituted on) 50' |
| FH | 22 | (France) Yvan Reilhac | | (substituted on) 55' |
| FB | 23 | (France) Arthur Retière | | (substituted on) 55' |
Coach:
(France) Ugo Mola

| FB | 15 | Vunga Lilo |
| RW | 14 | Viliami Lolohea | | (substituted off) 61' |
| OC | 13 | Alaska Taufa |
| IC | 12 | Siale Piutau (c) |
| LW | 11 | Daniel Kilioni |
| FH | 10 | Kurt Morath | | (substituted off) 34' |
| SH | 9 | Sonatane Takulua |
| N8 | 8 | Sione Vailanu |
| OF | 7 | Fotu Lokotui | | (substituted off) 48' |
| BF | 6 | Daniel Faleafa |
| RL | 5 | Leva Fifita |
| LL | 4 | Sam Ulufonua | | (substituted off) 70' |
| TP | 3 | Maʻafu Fia | | (substituted off) 40' |
| HK | 2 | Paul Ngauamo | | (substituted off) 55' |
| LP | 1 | Siegfried Fisi'ihoi | | (substituted off) 70' |
Replacements:
| HK | 16 | Sosefo Sakalia | (yellow card) 75' | (substituted on) 55' |
| PR | 17 | Tolu Fahamokioa | | (substituted on) 70' |
| PR | 18 | Ben Tameifuna | | (substituted on) 40' |
| LK | 19 | Valentino Mapapalangi | | (substituted on) 70' |
| FL | 20 | Zane Kapeli | | (substituted on) 48' |
| SH | 21 | Leon Fukofuka | | | (substituted on) 59' |
| FH | 22 | Latiume Fosita | | (substituted on) 34' | (substituted off) 59' |
| WG | 23 | Latu Vaeno | | (substituted on) 61' |
Coach:
(Australia) Toutai Kefu

Touch judges:
Mike Adamson (Scotland)
Craig Evans (Wales)
Television match official:
Brian MacNeice (Ireland)

10 November 2018
17:20 GMT (UTC+0)

| Wales | 9–6 | Australia |
| Pen: Halfpenny (2/4) 21', 67'; Biggar (1/1) 76' | Report | Pen: Foley (1/1) 33'; To'omua (1/1) 74' |

Millennium Stadium, Cardiff
Attendance: 64,110
Referee: Ben O'Keeffe (New Zealand)

Team details

| FB | 15 | Leigh Halfpenny | (substituted off) 73' |
| RW | 14 | George North | (substituted off) 46' |
| OC | 13 | Jonathan Davies |
| IC | 12 | Hadleigh Parkes |
| LW | 11 | Josh Adams |
| FH | 10 | Gareth Anscombe |
| SH | 9 | Gareth Davies | (substituted off) 55' |
| N8 | 8 | Ross Moriarty |
| OF | 7 | Justin Tipuric |
| BF | 6 | Dan Lydiate | (substituted off) 59' |
| RL | 5 | Alun Wyn Jones (c) |
| LL | 4 | Adam Beard | (substituted off) 59' |
| TP | 3 | Tomas Francis | (substituted off) 46' |
| HK | 2 | Ken Owens |
| LP | 1 | Nicky Smith | (substituted off) 55' |
Replacements:
| HK | 16 | Elliot Dee |
| PR | 17 | Rob Evans | (substituted on) 55' |
| PR | 18 | Dillon Lewis | (substituted on) 46' |
| LK | 19 | Cory Hill | (substituted on) 59' |
| FL | 20 | Ellis Jenkins | (substituted on) 59' |
| SH | 21 | Tomos Williams | (substituted on) 55' |
| FH | 22 | Dan Biggar | (substituted on) 73' |
| FB | 23 | Liam Williams | (substituted on) 46' |
Coach:
(New Zealand) Warren Gatland

| FB | 15 | Dane Haylett-Petty |
| RW | 14 | Israel Folau |
| OC | 13 | Samu Kerevi |
| IC | 12 | Kurtley Beale |
| LW | 11 | Sefa Naivalu | (substituted off) 67' |
| FH | 10 | Bernard Foley | (substituted off) 64' |
| SH | 9 | Will Genia |
| N8 | 8 | David Pocock |
| OF | 7 | Michael Hooper (c) |
| BF | 6 | Jack Dempsey | (substituted off) 70' |
| RL | 5 | Adam Coleman | (substituted off) 59' |
| LL | 4 | Izack Rodda |
| TP | 3 | Allan Alaalatoa | (substituted off) 55' |
| HK | 2 | Tolu Latu | (substituted off) 55' |
| LP | 1 | Scott Sio | (substituted off) 59' |
Replacements:
| HK | 16 | Tatafu Polota-Nau | (substituted on) 55' |
| PR | 17 | Sekope Kepu | (substituted on) 59' |
| PR | 18 | Taniela Tupou | (substituted on) 55' |
| LK | 19 | Rob Simmons | (substituted on) 59' |
| FL | 20 | Ned Hanigan | (substituted on) 70' |
| SH | 21 | Nick Phipps |
| CE | 22 | Matt To'omua | (substituted on) 64' |
| WG | 23 | Jack Maddocks | (substituted on) 67' |
Coach:
(Australia) Michael Cheika

Man of the Match:
Justin Tipuric (Wales)

Touch judges:
Romain Poite (France)
Brendon Pickerill (New Zealand)
Television match official:
Simon McDowell (Ireland)

Notes:

- This was Wales' first win over Australia since their 21–18 victory in 2008, ending a 13-match winning streak for Australia over the Welsh, to claim the James Bevan Trophy.

10 November 2018
18:30 CET (UTC+1)

| United States | 30–29 | Samoa |
| Try: Taufete'e 10' c Germishuys 17' m Dolan (2) 35' m, 67' c Con: Hooley (2/4) 11', 68'; Pen: Hooley (2/3) 16', 80' | | Try: Mulipola 25' c Fidow 31' c Matavao 33' c Taulagi 40' m Con: Pisi (3/4) 26', 32', 34'; Pen: Leuila (1/1) 70' |

Anoeta Stadium, San Sebastián, Spain
Referee: Alexandre Ruiz (France)

Notes:

- David Ainuu, Devereaux Ferris, Gannon Moore (all United States), Raymond Niuia and Ben Nee-Nee (both Samoa) made their international debuts.
- This was the United States' first win over Samoa, winning their first test against a Pacific Nation since May 1999.

10 November 2018
18:30 WET (UTC+0)

| Ireland | 28–17 | Argentina |
| Try: Marmion 8' m Aki 24' c L. McGrath 65' c Con: Sexton (2/3) 25', 66'; Pen: Sexton (3/4) 38', 57', 75' | Report | Try: Delguy 16' m Pen: Sánchez (4/4) 2', 11', 34', 42' |

Aviva Stadium, Dublin
Attendance: 52,000
Referee: Nic Berry (Australia)

Team details

| FB | 15 | Jordan Larmour |
| RW | 14 | Keith Earls |
| OC | 13 | Will Addison |
| IC | 12 | Bundee Aki | (substituted off) 75' |
| LW | 11 | Jacob Stockdale |
| FH | 10 | Johnny Sexton | (substituted off) 75' |
| SH | 9 | Kieran Marmion | (substituted off) 56' |
| N8 | 8 | CJ Stander |
| OF | 7 | Seán O'Brien | (substituted off) 37' |
| BF | 6 | Peter O'Mahony |
| RL | 5 | James Ryan |
| LL | 4 | Iain Henderson | (substituted off) 57' |
| TP | 3 | Tadhg Furlong | (substituted off) 67' |
| HK | 2 | Rory Best (c) | (substituted off) 57' |
| LP | 1 | Cian Healy | (substituted off) 52' |
Replacements:
| HK | 16 | Seán Cronin | (substituted on) 57' |
| PR | 17 | Jack McGrath | (substituted on) 52' |
| PR | 18 | Andrew Porter | (substituted on) 67' |
| LK | 19 | Devin Toner | (substituted on) 57' |
| FL | 20 | Dan Leavy | (substituted on) 37' |
| SH | 21 | Luke McGrath | (substituted on) 56' |
| FH | 22 | Joey Carbery | (substituted on) 75' |
| WG | 23 | Andrew Conway | (substituted on) 75' |
Coach:
(New Zealand) Joe Schmidt

| FB | 15 | Emiliano Boffelli |
| RW | 14 | Bautista Delguy |
| OC | 13 | Matías Orlando | (substituted off) 57' |
| IC | 12 | Jerónimo de la Fuente |
| LW | 11 | Ramiro Moyano |
| FH | 10 | Nicolás Sánchez | (substituted off) 71' |
| SH | 9 | Tomás Cubelli | (substituted off) 63' |
| N8 | 8 | Javier Ortega Desio |
| OF | 7 | Guido Petti | (substituted off) 63' |
| BF | 6 | Pablo Matera (c) | (substituted off) 69' |
| RL | 5 | Tomás Lavanini |
| LL | 4 | Matías Alemanno |
| TP | 3 | Santiago Medrano | (substituted off) 71' |
| HK | 2 | Agustín Creevy | (substituted off) 63' |
| LP | 1 | Santiago García Botta | (substituted off) 57' |
Replacements:
| HK | 16 | Julián Montoya | (substituted on) 63' |
| PR | 17 | Juan Pablo Zeiss | (substituted on) 57' |
| PR | 18 | Lucio Sordoni | (substituted on) 71' |
| N8 | 19 | Rodrigo Bruni | (substituted on) 69' |
| FL | 20 | Tomás Lezana | (substituted on) 63' |
| SH | 21 | Gonzalo Bertranou | (substituted on) 63' |
| FH | 22 | Joaquín Díaz Bonilla | (substituted on) 71' |
| CE | 23 | Matías Moroni | (substituted on) 57' |
Coach:
(Argentina) Mario Ledesma

Man of the Match:
James Ryan (Ireland)

Touch judges:
Angus Gardner (Australia)
Ludovic Cayre (France)
Television match official:
David Grashoff (England)

Notes:

- Joaquín Díaz Bonilla, Rodrigo Bruni and Lucio Sordoni (all Argentina) made their international debuts.
- Ireland retained the Admiral Brown Cup.

10 November 2018
17:00 CLST (UTC-3)

| Chile | 21–38 | South American XV |

Estadio Municipal de La Pintana, La Pintana

10 November 2018
21:05 CET (UTC+1)

| France | 26–29 | South Africa |
| Try: Guirado 36' c Bastareaud 41' c Con: Serin (2/2) 38', 42'; Pen: Serin (3/5) 6', 11', 66'; Drop: Lopez (1/1) 33' | Report | Try: Nkosi 43' c Mbonambi 80+4' c Con: Pollard (2/2) 44', 80+5'; Pen: Pollard (5/5) 12', 21', 28', 52', 60' |

Stade de France, Saint-Denis
Referee: Nigel Owens (Wales)

Team details

| FB | 15 | Maxime Médard | | (substituted off) 75' |
| RW | 14 | Teddy Thomas |
| OC | 13 | Mathieu Bastareaud |
| IC | 12 | Geoffrey Doumayrou | (substituted off) 35' | (substituted on) 40' | (substituted off) 52' |
| LW | 11 | Damian Penaud |
| FH | 10 | Camille Lopez | (substituted off) 66' | (substituted on) 75' |
| SH | 9 | Baptiste Serin | (substituted off) 66' |
| N8 | 8 | Louis Picamoles | (substituted off) 60' |
| OF | 7 | Arthur Iturria |
| BF | 6 | Wenceslas Lauret |
| RL | 5 | Yoann Maestri |
| LL | 4 | Sébastien Vahaamahina | (substituted off) 76' |
| TP | 3 | Cedate Gomes Sa | (substituted off) 59' |
| HK | 2 | Guilhem Guirado (c) | (substituted off) 64' |
| LP | 1 | Jefferson Poirot | (substituted off) 59' |
Replacements:
| HK | 16 | Camille Chat | (substituted on) 64' |
| PR | 17 | Dany Priso | (substituted on) 59' |
| PR | 18 | Rabah Slimani | (substituted on) 59' |
| LK | 19 | Paul Gabrillagues | (substituted on) 76' |
| FL | 20 | Mathieu Babillot | (substituted on) 60' |
| SH | 21 | Antoine Dupont | (substituted on) 66' |
| FH | 22 | Anthony Belleau | (substituted on) 66' |
| CE | 23 | Gaël Fickou | (substituted on) 35' | (substituted off) 40' | (substituted on) 52' |
Coach:
(France) Jacques Brunel

| FB | 15 | Willie le Roux |
| RW | 14 | S'busiso Nkosi | (substituted off) 56' |
| OC | 13 | Jesse Kriel |
| IC | 12 | Damian de Allende | (substituted off) 66' |
| LW | 11 | Aphiwe Dyantyi |
| FH | 10 | Handré Pollard |
| SH | 9 | Faf de Klerk |
| N8 | 8 | Warren Whiteley | (substituted off) 49' |
| OF | 7 | Duane Vermeulen |
| BF | 6 | Siya Kolisi (c) | (substituted off) 66' |
| RL | 5 | Franco Mostert |
| LL | 4 | Pieter-Steph du Toit |
| TP | 3 | Frans Malherbe | (substituted off) 59' |
| HK | 2 | Malcolm Marx | (substituted off) 72' |
| LP | 1 | Steven Kitshoff | (substituted off) 62' |
Replacements:
| HK | 16 | Bongi Mbonambi | (substituted on) 72' |
| PR | 17 | Thomas du Toit | (substituted on) 62' |
| PR | 18 | Vincent Koch | (substituted on) 59' |
| LK | 19 | RG Snyman | (substituted on) 49' |
| FL | 20 | Francois Louw | (substituted on) 66' |
| SH | 21 | Embrose Papier |
| FH | 22 | Elton Jantjies | (substituted on) 66' |
| WG | 23 | Cheslin Kolbe | (substituted on) 56' |
Coach:
(South Africa) Rassie Erasmus

Touch judges:
Matthew Carley (England)
Tom Foley (England)
Television match official:
Rowan Kitt (England)

10 November 2018
19:00 BRST (UTC-3)

| Brazil | 3–35 | Māori All Blacks |
| Pen: Reeves (1/2) 50' | Report | Try: Walker-Leawere 3' c Dixon (2) 28' c, 61' c Hemopo 68' c Lowe 80' c Con: Black (5/5) 4', 29', 62', 69', 80' |

Estádio do Morumbi, São Paulo
Attendance: 34,541
Referee: Federico Anselmi (Argentina)

Team details

| FB | 15 | Daniel Sancery |
| RW | 14 | Lucas Tranquez |
| OC | 13 | Felipe Sancery (c) |
| IC | 12 | Moisés Duque |
| LW | 11 | Robert Tenório | | (substituted off) 76' |
| FH | 10 | Josh Reeves |
| SH | 9 | Lucas Duque | | (substituted off) 74' |
| N8 | 8 | André Arruda | | (substituted off) 23' | (substituted on) 28' |
| OF | 7 | Devon Müller | | (substituted off) 43' |
| BF | 6 | Artur Bergo |
| RL | 5 | Cléber Dias |
| LL | 4 | Luiz Vieira | | (substituted off) 69' |
| TP | 3 | Jardel Vettorato | | (substituted off) 74' |
| HK | 2 | Wilton Rebolo | (yellow card) 16' to 26' |
| LP | 1 | Lucas Abud |
Replacements:
| PR | 16 | Caíque Silva |
| HK | 17 | Endy Willian | | (substituted on) 23' | (substituted off) 28' |
| PR | 18 | Matheus Rocha | | (substituted on) 74' |
| LK | 19 | Matteo Dell’Acqua | | (substituted on) 43' |
| FL | 20 | Michael Moraes | | (substituted on) 69' |
| SH | 21 | Douglas Rauth | | (substituted on) 74' |
| CE | 22 | De Wet van Niekerk |
| WG | 23 | Stefano Giantorno | | (substituted on) 76' |
Coach:
(Argentina) Rodolfo Ambrosio

| FB | 15 | Matt Lansdown | (substituted off) 59' |
| RW | 14 | Jonah Lowe |
| OC | 13 | Rob Thompson |
| IC | 12 | Teihorangi Walden | (substituted off) 63' |
| LW | 11 | Shaun Stevenson |
| FH | 10 | Otere Black |
| SH | 9 | Jonathan Ruru | (substituted off) 50' |
| N8 | 8 | Akira Ioane | (substituted off) 59' |
| OF | 7 | Billy Harmon | (substituted off) 66' |
| BF | 6 | Reed Prinsep |
| RL | 5 | Pari Pari Parkinson |
| LL | 4 | Isaia Walker-Leawere |
| TP | 3 | Marcel Renata | (substituted off) 50' |
| HK | 2 | Ash Dixon (c) | (substituted off) 65' |
| LP | 1 | Ben May | (substituted off) 57' |
Replacements:
| HK | 16 | Robbie Abel | (substituted on) 65' |
| PR | 17 | Chris Eves | (substituted on) 57' |
| PR | 18 | Tyrel Lomax | (substituted on) 50' |
| LK | 19 | Jackson Hemopo | (substituted on) 59' |
| FL | 20 | Mitchell Karpik | (substituted on) 66' |
| SH | 21 | Bryn Hall | (substituted on) 50' |
| FH | 22 | Josh Ioane | (substituted on) 63' |
| CE | 23 | Matt Proctor | (substituted on) 59' |
Coach:
(New Zealand) Clayton McMillan

Touch judges:
Pablo de Luca (Argentina)
Francisco González (Uruguay)
Television match official:
Santiago Borsani (Argentina)

Notes:

- This was the first match played by the Māori All Blacks in South America since touring Argentina in 1988.
- Matteo Dell’Acqua and Devon Müller (both Brazil) made their international debuts.

=== 16/17 November ===
16 November 2018
19:30 GMT (UTC+0)

| Dragons (Wales) | 38–24 | Russia |
| Try: Lewis 7' m Lawrence 16' m Fry 23' c R. Davies 50' c Dixon 55' c Howells 79' c Con: Lewis (3/5) 24', 51', 56'; Lloyd 80' | Report | Try: Ilin (2) 5' c, 59' c Sychev 46' c Con: Gaisin (3/3) 6', 47', 60'; Pen: Gaisin (1/1) 10' |

Bridge Field, Bedwas
Referee: Simon Harding (England)

17 November 2018
14:00 EET (UTC+2)

| Romania | 5–31 | United States |
| Try: Melinte 13' m | | Try: de Haas 9' m Campbell (2) 23' c, 56' m Matyas 45' c Moore 76' c Con: Magie (3/5) 24', 46', 78' |

Ghencea Sports Complex, Bucharest
Referee: Christophe Ridley (England)

Notes:

- Tudor Boldor, Marius Iftimiciuc, Alexandru Savin (all Romania) and Nick Boyer (United States) made their international debuts.
- With this win, and Italy's loss to Australia, USA move to 13th on the World Rugby Rankings, their highest ever position.
- The United States reclaim the Pershing Cup, who had held it since the teams' previous meeting in 2016.

17 November 2018
13:00 GMT (UTC+0)

| Uruguay | 7–68 | Fiji |
| Try: Arata 30' c Con: Berchesi (1/1) 30' | | Try: Sau (3) 4' c, 57' m, 60' c Talebula 10' c Yato (3) 14' c, 33' c, 69' c Tuisova 23' c Kunatani 75' c Volavola 79' c Con: Volavola (9/10) 5', 11', 15', 24', 34', 60', 70', 77', 79' |

The Gillman's Ground, Hartpury, England
Referee: Tom Foley (England)

Notes:

- Manuel Ardao, Guillermo Pujadas (both Uruguay) and Eroni Sau (Fiji) made their international debuts.

17 November 2018
15:00 CET (UTC+1)

| Italy | 7–26 | Australia |
| Try: Bellini 45' c Con: Allan (1/1) 46' | | Try: Koroibete (2) 29' c, 34' c Tupou 43' c Genia 78' m Con: To'omua (3/4) 30', 36', 43' |

Stadio Euganeo, Padua
Attendance: 18,621
Referee: Pascal Gaüzère (France)

Team details

| FB | 15 | Jayden Hayward |
| RW | 14 | Tommaso Benvenuti |
| OC | 13 | Michele Campagnaro |
| IC | 12 | Tommaso Castello |
| LW | 11 | Mattia Bellini | (substituted off) 71' |
| FH | 10 | Tommaso Allan | (substituted off) 64' |
| SH | 9 | Tito Tebaldi | (substituted off) 59' |
| N8 | 8 | Braam Steyn |
| OF | 7 | Jake Polledri |
| BF | 6 | Sebastian Negri | (substituted off) 59' |
| RL | 5 | Dean Budd |
| LL | 4 | Alessandro Zanni | (substituted off) 49' |
| TP | 3 | Simone Ferrari | (substituted off) 49' |
| HK | 2 | Leonardo Ghiraldini (c) | (substituted off) 61' |
| LP | 1 | Andrea Lovotti | (substituted off) 61' |
Replacements:
| HK | 16 | Luca Bigi | (substituted on) 61' |
| PR | 17 | Cherif Traorè | (substituted on) 61' |
| PR | 18 | Tiziano Pasquali | (substituted on) 49' |
| LK | 19 | Marco Fuser | (substituted on) 49' |
| FL | 20 | Johan Meyer | (substituted on) 59' |
| SH | 21 | Guglielmo Palazzani | (substituted on) 59' |
| FH | 22 | Carlo Canna | (substituted on) 64' |
| CE | 23 | Luca Morisi | (substituted on) 71' |
Coach:
(Ireland) Conor O'Shea

| FB | 15 | Israel Folau |
| RW | 14 | Adam Ashley-Cooper |
| OC | 13 | Samu Kerevi |
| IC | 12 | Bernard Foley |
| LW | 11 | Marika Koroibete | | (substituted off) 64' |
| FH | 10 | Matt To'omua |
| SH | 9 | Jake Gordon | | (substituted off) 64' |
| N8 | 8 | David Pocock | | | | | (substituted off) 50' |
| OF | 7 | Michael Hooper (c) |
| BF | 6 | Jack Dempsey | | 6' to 13' | | (substituted off) 46' | (substituted on) 50' |
| RL | 5 | Adam Coleman | | (substituted off) 49' |
| LL | 4 | Izack Rodda |
| TP | 3 | Taniela Tupou | | (substituted off) 46' |
| HK | 2 | Folau Fainga'a | | (substituted off) 46' |
| LP | 1 | Scott Sio | (yellow card) 59' to 69' | | | (substituted off) 76' |
Replacements:
| HK | 16 | Tatafu Polota-Nau | | (substituted on) 46' |
| PR | 17 | Jermaine Ainsley | | (substituted on) 64' | (substituted off) 69' | (substituted on) 76' |
| PR | 18 | Sekope Kepu | | (substituted on) 46' |
| LK | 19 | Rob Simmons | | (substituted on) 49' |
| FL | 20 | Pete Samu | | (substituted on) 6' | (substituted off) 13' | (substituted on) 46' |
| SH | 21 | Will Genia | | (substituted on) 64' |
| CE | 22 | Kurtley Beale | | (substituted on) 52' |
| FB | 23 | Dane Haylett-Petty | | | (substituted on) 69' |
Coach:
(Australia) Michael Cheika

Man of the Match:
Samu Kerevi (Australia)

Touch judges:
Andrew Brace (Ireland)
Mike Adamson (Scotland)
Television match official:
Simon McDowell (Ireland)

Notes:

- Jake Gordon (Australia) made his international debut.

17 November 2018
18:00 GET (UTC+4)

| Georgia | 27–19 | Samoa |
| Try: Lobzhanidze 30' c Giorgadze 60' c Aprasidze 65' c Con: Abzhandadze (3/3) 30', 61', 66'; Pen: Abzhandadze (2/2) 2', 71' | | Try: Taulagi 7' c Paulo 16' m Tuala 25' c Con: Pisi (2/3) 8', 26' |

Avchala Rugby Stadium, Tbilisi
Referee: Karl Dickson (England)

Team details

| FB | 15 | Lasha Khmaladze |
| RW | 14 | Giorgi Kveseladze |
| OC | 13 | Merab Sharikadze (c) |
| IC | 12 | Tamaz Mchedlidze |
| LW | 11 | Zurab Dzneladze |
| FH | 10 | Tedo Abzhandadze |
| SH | 9 | Vasil Lobzhanidze | | (substituted off) 51' |
| N8 | 8 | Beka Gorgadze |
| OF | 7 | Giorgi Tsutskiridze |
| BF | 6 | Otar Giorgadze | | (substituted off) 51' | (substituted on) 56' | (substituted off) 71' |
| RL | 5 | Lasha Lomidze |
| LL | 4 | Nodar Tcheishvili | | (substituted off) 61' |
| TP | 3 | Davit Kubriashvili | | (substituted off) 46' |
| HK | 2 | Jaba Bregvadze | (yellow card) 43' to 53' | | | (substituted off) 78' |
| LP | 1 | Mikheil Nariashvili | | (substituted off) 46' |
Replacements:
| HK | 16 | Shalva Mamukashvili | | (substituted on) 51' | (substituted off) 56' | (substituted on) 78' |
| PR | 17 | Guram Gogichashvili | | (substituted on) 56' |
| PR | 18 | Beka Gigashvili | | (substituted on) 46' |
| LK | 19 | Shalva Sutiashvili | | (substituted on) 61' |
| N8 | 20 | Beka Bitsadze | | | | (substituted on) 71' |
| SH | 21 | Gela Aprasidze | | (substituted on) 51' |
| CE | 22 | Lasha Malaguradze |
| WG | 23 | Anzor Sitchinava |
Coach:
(New Zealand) Milton Haig

| FB | 15 | Ahsee Tuala | | (substituted off) 67' |
| RW | 14 | Jamie-Jerry Taulagi | (yellow card) 43' to 53' |
| OC | 13 | Alapati Leiua |
| IC | 12 | Rey Lee-Lo |
| LW | 11 | Ed Fidow |
| FH | 10 | Tusi Pisi | | (substituted off) 53' |
| SH | 9 | Dwayne Polotaivao | | (substituted off) 53' |
| N8 | 8 | Josh Tyrell | | (substituted off) 58' |
| OF | 7 | Jack Lam (c) |
| BF | 6 | Piula Faʻasalele | | (substituted off) 46' |
| RL | 5 | Kane Leaupepe |
| LL | 4 | Filo Paulo |
| TP | 3 | Paul Alo-Emile | | (substituted off) 40' |
| HK | 2 | Motu Matu'u | | (substituted off) 35' |
| LP | 1 | Logovi'i Mulipola | | (substituted off) 51' |
Replacements:
| HK | 16 | Manu Leiataua | | (substituted on) 35' |
| TH | 17 | James Lay | | (substituted on) 51' |
| LH | 18 | Jordan Lay | | (substituted on) 40' |
| N8 | 19 | Mat Luamanu | | (substituted on) 46' |
| FL | 20 | Faifili Levave | | (substituted on) 58' |
| SH | 21 | Pele Cowley | | (substituted on) 53' |
| FH | 22 | D'Angelo Leuila | | (substituted on) 53' |
| WG | 23 | Alofa Alofa | | (substituted on) 67' |
Coach:
(New Zealand) Steve Jackson

Touch judges:
Ben Whitehouse (Wales)
Sam Grove-White (Scotland)
Television match official:
Brian MacNeice (Ireland)

Notes:

- Tedo Abzhandadze, Beka Gigashvili and Guram Gogichashvili (all Georgia) made their international debuts.
- Tamaz Mchedlidze (Georgia) earned his 50th test cap.

17 November 2018
14:30 GMT (UTC+0)

| Wales | 74–24 | Tonga |
| Try: Penalty try 2'; Biggar 5' c L. Williams (2) 10' c, 77' c S. Evans 45' c T. Williams 57' c Morgan 62' m Hill 64' c A. Davies 69' c Patchell 71' c Con: Biggar (4/4) 6', 11', 46', 59'; Patchell (4/5) 65', 70', 72', 78'; Pen: Biggar (2/2) 21', 55' | | Try: Fifita 31' c Mafi 38' c Vailanu 42' c Con: Takulua (3/3) 32', 39', 43'; Pen: Takulua (1/1) 8' |

Millennium Stadium, Cardiff
Attendance: 61,284
Referee: Nic Berry (Australia)

Team details

| FB | 15 | Jonah Holmes |
| RW | 14 | Liam Williams |
| OC | 13 | Tyler Morgan |
| IC | 12 | Owen Watkin |
| LW | 11 | Steff Evans |
| FH | 10 | Dan Biggar | (substituted off) 59' |
| SH | 9 | Tomos Williams | (substituted off) 59' |
| N8 | 8 | Seb Davies |
| OF | 7 | Ellis Jenkins (c) |
| BF | 6 | Aaron Wainwright |
| RL | 5 | Adam Beard | (substituted off) 59' |
| LL | 4 | Jake Ball |
| TP | 3 | Leon Brown | (substituted off) 52' |
| HK | 2 | Elliot Dee | (substituted off) 52' |
| LP | 1 | Wyn Jones | (substituted off) 46' |
Replacements:
| HK | 16 | Ryan Elias | (substituted on) 52' |
| PR | 17 | Rob Evans | (substituted on) 46' |
| PR | 18 | Tomas Francis | (substituted on) 52' |
| LK | 19 | Cory Hill | (substituted on) 59' |
| N8 | 20 | Ross Moriarty |
| SH | 21 | Aled Davies | (substituted on) 59' |
| FH | 22 | Rhys Patchell | (substituted on) 59' |
| WG | 23 | Josh Adams |
Coach:
(New Zealand) Warren Gatland

| FB | 15 | Vunga Lilo | | | | (substituted off) 65' |
| RW | 14 | Viliami Lolohea | | (substituted off) 44' | (substituted on) 52' |
| OC | 13 | Alaska Taufa |
| IC | 12 | Siale Piutau (c) |
| LW | 11 | Daniel Kilioni |
| FH | 10 | Kurt Morath |
| SH | 9 | Sonatane Takulua | | (substituted off) 65' |
| N8 | 8 | Sione Vailanu | | (substituted off) 65' |
| OF | 7 | Fotu Lokotui | | (substituted off) 52' |
| BF | 6 | Daniel Faleafa |
| RL | 5 | Steve Mafi |
| LL | 4 | Leva Fifita | (yellow card) 2' to 12' |
| TP | 3 | Maʻafu Fia | | (substituted off) 52' |
| HK | 2 | Paul Ngauamo | | (substituted off) 73' |
| LP | 1 | Siegfried Fisi'ihoi | | (substituted off) 67' |
Replacements:
| HK | 16 | Sosefo Sakalia | | (substituted on) 73' |
| PR | 17 | Latu Talakai | | (substituted on) 67' |
| PR | 18 | Paea Faʻanunu | | (substituted on) 52' |
| LK | 19 | Onehunga Havili | | (substituted on) 65' |
| FL | 20 | Michael Faleafa | | (substituted on) 52' |
| SH | 21 | Leon Fukofuka | | (substituted on) 65' |
| FH | 22 | Kali Hala |
| FB | 23 | Atieli Pakalani | | (substituted on) 44' | (substituted off) 52' | (substituted on) 65' |
Coach:
(Australia) Toutai Kefu

Man of the Match:
Dan Biggar (Wales)

Touch judges:
Angus Gardner (Australia)
Shuhei Kubo (Japan)
Television match official:
Olly Hodges (Ireland)

Notes:

- Jonah Holmes (Wales) and Maʻafu Fia (Tonga) made their international debuts.
- Liam Williams (Wales) earned his 50th test cap.
- This was Wales' biggest winning margin over Tonga, surpassing the 44-point difference set in 2001.

17 November 2018
15:45 CET (UTC+1)

| Spain | 34–13 | Namibia |
| Try: Garcia 15' c Penalty try (2) 27', 63'; Borrego 40' c Con: Calle (2/2) 16', 40'; Pen: Calle (2/2) 69', 77' | | Try: Stevens 9' c Con: Stevens (1/1) 10'; Pen: Stevens (2/2) 21', 48' |

Estadio Nacional Complutense, Madrid
Attendance: 4,000
Referee: Pierre Brousset (France)

Notes:

- Mickael de Marco, Tobias Francis, Lucas Levy, Lucas Rubio, Richard Stewart (all Spain), Jason Benade, Henrique Olivier, Chad Plato and Wihan von Wielligh (all Namibia) made their international debuts.

17 November 2018
15:00 GMT (UTC+0)

| England | 35–15 | Japan |
| Try: Care 2' c Wilson 58' c Cokanasiga 69' c Hartley 75' m Con: Ford (3/4) 4', 59', 71'; Pen: Daly (1/1) 27'; Ford (2/2) 55', 64' | | Try: Nakamura 21' c Leitch 30' m Con: Tamura (1/2) 22'; Pen: Tamura (1/1) 15' |

Twickenham Stadium, London
Attendance: 81,151
Referee: Paul Williams (New Zealand)

Team details

| FB | 15 | Elliot Daly |
| RW | 14 | Joe Cokanasiga |
| OC | 13 | Jack Nowell |
| IC | 12 | Alex Lozowski | | (substituted off) 40' |
| LW | 11 | Chris Ashton | | (substituted off) 32' |
| FH | 10 | George Ford (c) |
| SH | 9 | Danny Care | | (substituted off) 59' |
| N8 | 8 | Zach Mercer | | (substituted off) 20' | (substituted on) 32' | (substituted off) 48' |
| OF | 7 | Mark Wilson |
| BF | 6 | Courtney Lawes |
| RL | 5 | Maro Itoje |
| LL | 4 | Charlie Ewels | | (substituted off) 74' |
| TP | 3 | Harry Williams | | (substituted off) 50' |
| HK | 2 | Jamie George | (yellow card) 20' to 30' | | | (substituted off) 72' |
| LP | 1 | Alec Hepburn | | (substituted off) 48' |
Replacements:
| HK | 16 | Dylan Hartley | | (substituted on) 20' | (substituted off) 32' | (substituted on) 72' |
| PR | 17 | Ben Moon | | (substituted on) 48' |
| PR | 18 | Kyle Sinckler | | (substituted on) 50' |
| FL | 19 | Ted Hill | | (substituted on) 74' |
| FL | 20 | Sam Underhill | | | | (substituted on) 48' |
| SH | 21 | Richard Wigglesworth | | (substituted on) 59' |
| FH | 22 | Owen Farrell | | (substituted on) 40' |
| CE | 23 | Henry Slade | | (substituted on) 32' |
Coach:
(Australia) Eddie Jones

| FB | 15 | Will Tupou |
| RW | 14 | Akihito Yamada |
| OC | 13 | Timothy Lafaele |
| IC | 12 | Ryoto Nakamura |
| LW | 11 | Kenki Fukuoka |
| FH | 10 | Yu Tamura | (substituted off) 69' |
| SH | 9 | Fumiaki Tanaka | (substituted off) 40' |
| N8 | 8 | Kazuki Himeno | (substituted off) 59' |
| OF | 7 | Masakatsu Nishikawa | (substituted off) 40' |
| BF | 6 | Michael Leitch (c) |
| RL | 5 | Uwe Helu | (substituted off) 40' |
| LL | 4 | Wimpie van der Walt |
| TP | 3 | Koo Ji-won | (substituted off) 72' |
| HK | 2 | Atsushi Sakate | (substituted off) 69' |
| LP | 1 | Keita Inagaki | (substituted off) 74' |
Replacements:
| HK | 16 | Yusuke Niwai | (substituted on) 69' |
| PR | 17 | Koki Yamamoto | (substituted on) 74' |
| PR | 18 | Asaeli Ai Valu | (substituted on) 72' |
| LK | 19 | Samuela Anise | (substituted on) 40' |
| FL | 20 | Hendrik Tui | (substituted on) 59' |
| FL | 21 | Shunsuke Nunomaki | (substituted on) 40' |
| SH | 22 | Yutaka Nagare | (substituted on) 40' |
| FH | 23 | Rikiya Matsuda | (substituted on) 69' |
Coach:
(New Zealand) Jamie Joseph

Man of the Match:
Maro Itoje (England)

Touch judges:
Nigel Owens (Wales)
Dan Jones (Wales)
Television match official:
Marius Jonker (South Africa)

Notes:

- Joe Cokanasiga and Ted Hill (both England) made their international debuts.
- George Ford (England) earned his 50th test cap.
- This was the first meeting between the two teams to be held in England, and outside of a Rugby World Cup.

17 November 2018
17:20 GMT (UTC+0)

| Scotland | 20–26 | South Africa |
| Try: Horne 18' c Watson 33' c Con: Laidlaw (2/2) 19', 34'; Pen: Laidlaw (2/2) 26', 46' | Report | Try: Kriel 5' c Pollard 20' c Con: Pollard (2/2) 6', 21'; Pen: Pollard (3/5) 24', 38', 49'; Jantjies (1/1) 72' |

Murrayfield Stadium, Edinburgh
Attendance: 67,144
Referee: Romain Poite (France)

Team details

| FB | 15 | Stuart Hogg | (substituted off) 62' |
| RW | 14 | Tommy Seymour |
| OC | 13 | Huw Jones |
| IC | 12 | Peter Horne | (substituted off) 67' |
| LW | 11 | Sean Maitland |
| FH | 10 | Finn Russell |
| SH | 9 | Greig Laidlaw (c) | (substituted off) 62' |
| N8 | 8 | Ryan Wilson | (substituted off) 55' |
| OF | 7 | Hamish Watson |
| BF | 6 | Sam Skinner | (substituted off) 72' |
| RL | 5 | Jonny Gray |
| LL | 4 | Ben Toolis |
| TP | 3 | WP Nel | (substituted off) 55' |
| HK | 2 | Stuart McInally | (substituted off) 55' |
| LP | 1 | Gordon Reid | (substituted off) 44' |
Replacements:
| HK | 16 | Fraser Brown | (substituted on) 55' |
| PR | 17 | Allan Dell | (substituted on) 44' |
| PR | 18 | Simon Berghan | (substituted on) 55' |
| N8 | 19 | Josh Strauss | (substituted on) 55' |
| FL | 20 | Jamie Ritchie | (substituted on) 72' |
| SH | 21 | Ali Price | (substituted on) 62' |
| FH | 22 | Adam Hastings | (substituted on) 67' |
| CE | 23 | Chris Harris | (substituted on) 62' |
Coach:
(Scotland) Gregor Townsend

| FB | 15 | Willie le Roux | (yellow card) 45' to 55' |
| RW | 14 | S'busiso Nkosi | | (substituted off) 63' |
| OC | 13 | Jesse Kriel |
| IC | 12 | Damian de Allende | | (substituted off) 55' |
| LW | 11 | Aphiwe Dyantyi |
| FH | 10 | Handré Pollard |
| SH | 9 | Embrose Papier | | (substituted off) 77' |
| N8 | 8 | Duane Vermeulen |
| OF | 7 | Pieter-Steph du Toit |
| BF | 6 | Siya Kolisi (c) | | (substituted off) 65' |
| RL | 5 | Franco Mostert |
| LL | 4 | RG Snyman | | (substituted off) 59' |
| TP | 3 | Frans Malherbe | | (substituted off) 57' |
| HK | 2 | Malcolm Marx | | (substituted off) 65' |
| LP | 1 | Steven Kitshoff | | (substituted off) 57' |
Replacements:
| HK | 16 | Bongi Mbonambi | | (substituted on) 65' |
| PR | 17 | Thomas du Toit | | (substituted on) 57' |
| PR | 18 | Vincent Koch | | (substituted on) 57' |
| LK | 19 | Lood de Jager | | (substituted on) 59' |
| FL | 20 | Francois Louw | | (substituted on) 65' |
| SH | 21 | Ivan van Zyl | | (substituted on) 77' |
| FH | 22 | Elton Jantjies | | (substituted on) 55' |
| WG | 23 | Cheslin Kolbe | | (substituted on) 63' |
Coach:
(South Africa) Rassie Erasmus

Man of the Match:
Handré Pollard (South Africa)

Touch judges:
Ben O'Keeffe (New Zealand)
Frank Murphy (Ireland)
Television match official:
Ben Skeen (New Zealand)

17 November 2018
16:00 CLST (UTC-3)

| Chile | 0–73 | Māori All Blacks |
| | | Try: Hall (2) 4' c, 32' c Hemopo (2) 15' c, 77' m Karpik (3) 21' c, 74' c, 80' c J. Ioane 36' c Lowe 47' c Nock (2) 62' c, 68' m Con: Black (7/7) 4', 16', 21', 33', 38', 48', 64'; J. Ioane (2/4) 75', 80' |

Estadio San Carlos de Apoquindo, Las Condes
Attendance: 12,000
Referee: Pablo de Luca (Argentina)

Notes:

- Augusto Böhme, Tomás Contreras and Marcelo Torrealba (all Chile) made their international debuts.

17 November 2018
19:00 WET (UTC+0)

| Ireland | 16–9 | New Zealand |
| Try: Stockdale 47'; Con: Sexton 49'; Pen: Sexton (3/3) 10', 26', 38' | Report | Pen: B.Barrett (2/2) 16', 68'; Drop: B.Barrett (1/1) 28' |

Aviva Stadium, Dublin
Attendance: 51,000
Referee: Wayne Barnes (England)

Team details

| FB | 15 | Rob Kearney | (substituted off) 65' |
| RW | 14 | Keith Earls |
| OC | 13 | Garry Ringrose |
| IC | 12 | Bundee Aki |
| LW | 11 | Jacob Stockdale |
| FH | 10 | Johnny Sexton | (substituted off) 76' |
| SH | 9 | Kieran Marmion | (substituted off) 58' |
| N8 | 8 | CJ Stander |
| OF | 7 | Josh van der Flier |
| BF | 6 | Peter O'Mahony | (substituted off) 63' |
| RL | 5 | James Ryan |
| LL | 4 | Devin Toner | (substituted off) 61' |
| TP | 3 | Tadhg Furlong | (substituted off) 64' |
| HK | 2 | Rory Best (c) | (substituted off) 64' |
| LP | 1 | Cian Healy | (substituted off) 51' |
Replacements:
| HK | 16 | Seán Cronin | (substituted on) 64' |
| PR | 17 | Jack McGrath | (substituted on) 51' |
| PR | 18 | Andrew Porter | (substituted on) 64' |
| LK | 19 | Iain Henderson | (substituted on) 61' |
| FL | 20 | Jordi Murphy | (substituted on) 63' |
| SH | 21 | Luke McGrath | (substituted on) 51' |
| FH | 22 | Joey Carbery | (substituted on) 76' |
| FB | 23 | Jordan Larmour | (substituted on) 65' |
Coach:
(New Zealand) Joe Schmidt

| FB | 15 | Damian McKenzie | (substituted off) 55' |
| RW | 14 | Ben Smith |
| OC | 13 | Jack Goodhue |
| IC | 12 | Ryan Crotty | (substituted off) 61' |
| LW | 11 | Rieko Ioane |
| FH | 10 | Beauden Barrett |
| SH | 9 | Aaron Smith | (substituted off) 57' |
| N8 | 8 | Kieran Read (c) |
| OF | 7 | Ardie Savea | (substituted off) 73' |
| BF | 6 | Liam Squire | (substituted off) 31' |
| RL | 5 | Brodie Retallick |
| LL | 4 | Sam Whitelock |
| TP | 3 | Owen Franks | (substituted off) 46' |
| HK | 2 | Codie Taylor | (substituted off) 46' |
| LP | 1 | Karl Tu'inukuafe | (substituted off) 46' |
Replacements:
| HK | 16 | Dane Coles | (substituted on) 46' |
| PR | 17 | Ofa Tu'ungafasi | (substituted on) 46' |
| PR | 18 | Nepo Laulala | (substituted on) 46' |
| LK | 19 | Scott Barrett | (substituted on) 31' |
| FL | 20 | Matt Todd | (substituted on) 73' |
| SH | 21 | TJ Perenara | (substituted on) 57' |
| FH | 22 | Richie Mo'unga | (substituted on) 55' |
| CE | 23 | Anton Lienert-Brown | (substituted on) 61' |
Coach:
(New Zealand) Steve Hansen

Man of the Match:
Peter O'Mahony (Ireland)

Touch judges:
Mathieu Raynal (France)
Marius Mitrea (Italy)
Television match official:
Rowan Kitt (England)

Notes:

- This was Ireland's first home win over New Zealand.

17 November 2018
21:05 CET (UTC+1)

| France | 28–13 | Argentina |
| Try: Thomas (2) 24' m, 47' c Guirado 70' c Con: Serin (2/3) 49', 71'; Pen: Serin (3/3) 7', 32', 67' | | Try: Moyano 1' c Con: Sánchez (1/1) 2'; Pen: Sánchez (2/2) 9', 45' |

Stade Pierre-Mauroy, Villeneuve-d'Ascq
Attendance: 40,000
Referee: Glen Jackson (New Zealand)

Team details

| FB | 15 | Maxime Médard | (substituted off) 2' |
| RW | 14 | Teddy Thomas |
| OC | 13 | Mathieu Bastareaud |
| IC | 12 | Gaël Fickou |
| LW | 11 | Yoann Huget |
| FH | 10 | Camille Lopez | (substituted off) 73' |
| SH | 9 | Baptiste Serin | (substituted off) 73' |
| N8 | 8 | Louis Picamoles | (substituted off) 67' |
| OF | 7 | Arthur Iturria |
| BF | 6 | Wenceslas Lauret |
| RL | 5 | Yoann Maestri | (substituted off) 73' |
| LL | 4 | Sébastien Vahaamahina |
| TP | 3 | Cedate Gomes Sa | (substituted off) 45' |
| HK | 2 | Guilhem Guirado (c) | (substituted off) 73' |
| LP | 1 | Jefferson Poirot | (substituted off) 60' |
Replacements:
| HK | 16 | Camille Chat | (substituted on) 73' |
| PR | 17 | Dany Priso | (substituted on) 60' |
| PR | 18 | Rabah Slimani | (substituted on) 45' |
| LK | 19 | Paul Gabrillagues | (substituted on) 73' |
| FL | 20 | Mathieu Babillot | (substituted on) 67' |
| SH | 21 | Antoine Dupont | (substituted on) 73' |
| FH | 22 | Anthony Belleau | (substituted on) 73' |
| WG | 23 | Benjamin Fall | (substituted on) 2' |
Coach:
(France) Jacques Brunel

| FB | 15 | Emiliano Boffelli |
| RW | 14 | Bautista Delguy |
| OC | 13 | Matías Orlando |
| IC | 12 | Jerónimo de la Fuente |
| LW | 11 | Ramiro Moyano | (substituted off) 63' |
| FH | 10 | Nicolás Sánchez |
| SH | 9 | Gonzalo Bertranou | (substituted off) 75' |
| N8 | 8 | Javier Ortega Desio | (substituted off) 67' |
| OF | 7 | Guido Petti | (substituted off) 59' |
| BF | 6 | Pablo Matera (c) |
| RL | 5 | Tomás Lavanini | (substituted off) 59' |
| LL | 4 | Matías Alemanno |
| TP | 3 | Santiago Medrano | (substituted off) 71' |
| HK | 2 | Agustín Creevy | (substituted off) 59' |
| LP | 1 | Santiago García Botta | (substituted off) 53' |
Replacements:
| HK | 16 | Julián Montoya | (substituted on) 59' |
| PR | 17 | Juan Pablo Zeiss | (substituted on) 53' |
| PR | 18 | Lucio Sordoni | (substituted on) 71' |
| LK | 19 | Mariano Galarza | (substituted on) 59' |
| N8 | 20 | Rodrigo Bruni | (substituted on) 67' |
| FL | 21 | Tomás Lezana | (substituted on) 59' |
| SH | 22 | Tomás Cubelli | (substituted on) 75' |
| CE | 23 | Matías Moroni | (substituted on) 63' |
Coach:
(Argentina) Mario Ledesma

Man of the Match:
Gaël Fickou (France)

Touch judges:
Matthew Carley (England)
Ian Davies (Wales)
Television match official:
David Grashoff (England)

Notes:

- Mathieu Bastareaud, Rabah Slimani (both France), Julián Montoya and Javier Ortega Desio (both Argentina) earned their 50th test caps.

=== 24 November ===
24 November 2018
14:00 EET (UTC+2)

| Romania | 20–27 | Uruguay |
| Try: Melinte 17' c Pristăviță 72' c Con: Plai (1/1) 18'; Vlaicu (1/1) 74'; Pen: Plai (2/2) 6', 31' | | Try: Vilaseca 40' c Penalty try 62'; A. Ormaechea 80' c Con: Berchesi (2/2) 40', 80'; Pen: Berchesi (2/2) 25', 38' |

Ghencea Sports Complex, Bucharest
Referee: Ben Whitehouse (Wales)

24 November 2018
18:00 GET (UTC+4)

| Georgia | 20–9 | Tonga |
| Try: Giorgadze 24' c Zhvania 80' c Con: Abzhandadze (2/2) 25', 80'; Pen: Abzhandadze 54', 70' | Report | Pen: Takulua 6', 16', 41' |

Mikheil Meskhi Stadium, Tbilisi
Referee: Mathieu Raynal (France)

24 November 2018
15:00 CET (UTC+1)

| Italy | 3–66 | New Zealand |
| Pen: Allan 13' | Report | Try: Perenara 9' m McKenzie 18' c, 28' m, 53' c J. Barrett 32' c, 40' c, 73' c, 80' c Laumape 44' c B. Barrett 46' c Con: B. Barrett (5/7) 19', 33', 40', 45', 46'; Mo'unga (3/3) 53', 74', 80' |

Stadio Olimpico, Rome
Attendance: 53,204
Referee: Andrew Brace (Ireland)

Team details

| FB | 15 | Jayden Hayward |
| RW | 14 | Tommaso Benvenuti |
| OC | 13 | Michele Campagnaro |
| IC | 12 | Tommaso Castello |
| LW | 11 | Luca Sperandio | (substituted off) 51' |
| FH | 10 | Tommaso Allan | (substituted off) 55' |
| SH | 9 | Tito Tebaldi | (substituted off) 67' |
| N8 | 8 | Braam Steyn |
| OF | 7 | Jake Polledri |
| BF | 6 | Sebastian Negri | (substituted off) 71' |
| RL | 5 | Dean Budd |
| LL | 4 | Alessandro Zanni | (substituted off) 38' |
| TP | 3 | Simone Ferrari | (substituted off) 60' |
| HK | 2 | Leonardo Ghiraldini (c) | (substituted off) 60' |
| LP | 1 | Andrea Lovotti | (substituted off) 48' |
Replacements:
| HK | 16 | Luca Bigi | (substituted on) 60' |
| PR | 17 | Cherif Traorè | (substituted on) 48' |
| PR | 18 | Tiziano Pasquali | (substituted on) 60' |
| LK | 19 | Marco Fuser | (substituted on) 38' |
| FL | 20 | Johan Meyer | (substituted on) 71' |
| SH | 21 | Guglielmo Palazzani | (substituted on) 67' |
| FH | 22 | Luca Morisi | (substituted on) 55' |
| CE | 23 | Edoardo Padovani | (substituted on) 51' |
Coach:
(Ireland) Conor O'Shea

| FB | 15 | Damian McKenzie |
| RW | 14 | Jordie Barrett |
| OC | 13 | Anton Lienert-Brown |
| IC | 12 | Ngani Laumape |
| LW | 11 | Waisake Naholo | (substituted off) 55' |
| FH | 10 | Beauden Barrett | (substituted off) 51' |
| SH | 9 | TJ Perenara | (substituted off) 51' |
| N8 | 8 | Kieran Read (c) |
| OF | 7 | Ardie Savea | (substituted off) 48' |
| BF | 6 | Vaea Fifita |
| RL | 5 | Scott Barrett | (substituted off) 60' |
| LL | 4 | Patrick Tuipulotu |
| TP | 3 | Nepo Laulala | (substituted off) 54' |
| HK | 2 | Dane Coles | (substituted off) 60' |
| LP | 1 | Ofa Tu'ungafasi | (substituted off) 60' |
Replacements:
| HK | 16 | Nathan Harris | (substituted on) 60' |
| PR | 17 | Karl Tu'inukuafe | (substituted on) 60' |
| PR | 18 | Angus Ta'avao | (substituted on) 54' |
| LK | 19 | Brodie Retallick | (substituted on) 60' |
| FL | 20 | Dalton Papali'i | (substituted on) 48' |
| SH | 21 | Te Toiroa Tahuriorangi | (substituted on) 51' |
| FH | 22 | Richie Mo'unga | (substituted on) 51' |
| CE | 23 | Rieko Ioane | (substituted on) 55' |
Coach:
(New Zealand) Steve Hansen

24 November 2018
14:05 GMT (UTC+0)

| Japan | 32–27 | Russia |
| Try: Leitch 30' c, 71' m Fukuoka 43' c Tui 54' c Con: Matsuda (3/4) 31', 44', 55'; Pen: Matsuda 25', 67' | Report | Try: Ostroushko 21' c Sel'skiy 58' m Con: Kushnarev (1/1) 22'; Pen: Kushnarev 8', 18'; Gaisin 36', 37' |

Kingsholm Stadium, Gloucester, England
Referee: Jérôme Garcès (France)

24 November 2018
14:30 GMT (UTC+0)

| Scotland | 14–9 | Argentina |
| Try: Maitland 66' m Pen: Laidlaw 4', 33', 56' | Report | Pen: Sánchez 28', 43', 75' |

Murrayfield Stadium, Edinburgh
Attendance: 67,144
Referee: Paul Williams (New Zealand)

Team details

| FB | 15 | Stuart Hogg |
| RW | 14 | Sean Maitland |
| OC | 13 | Huw Jones |
| IC | 12 | Finn Russell |
| LW | 11 | Blair Kinghorn | (substituted off) 67' |
| FH | 10 | Adam Hastings | (substituted off) 61' |
| SH | 9 | Greig Laidlaw (c) |
| N8 | 8 | Josh Strauss | (substituted off) 50' |
| OF | 7 | Hamish Watson |
| BF | 6 | Jamie Ritchie |
| RL | 5 | Johnny Gray | (substituted off) 67' |
| LL | 4 | Grant Gilchrist |
| TP | 3 | Simon Berghan | (substituted off) 50' |
| HK | 2 | Fraser Brown | (substituted off) 61' |
| LP | 1 | Allan Dell | (substituted off) 67' |
Replacements:
| HK | 16 | Stuart McInally | (substituted on) 61' |
| PR | 17 | Alex Allan | (substituted on) 67' |
| PR | 18 | WP Nel | (substituted on) 50' |
| LK | 19 | Sam Skinner | (substituted on) 67' |
| N8 | 20 | Ryan Wilson | (substituted on) 50' |
| SH | 21 | George Horne |
| FH | 22 | Alex Dunbar | (substituted on) 61' |
| CE | 23 | Byron McGuigan | (substituted on) 67' |
Coach:
(Scotland) Gregor Townsend

| FB | 15 | Emiliano Boffelli |
| RW | 14 | Bautista Delguy | | (substituted off) 72' |
| OC | 13 | Matías Moroni |
| IC | 12 | Jerónimo de la Fuente | | (substituted off) 24' |
| LW | 11 | Ramiro Moyano |
| FH | 10 | Nicolás Sánchez |
| SH | 9 | Gonzalo Bertranou | | (substituted off) 50' |
| N8 | 8 | Javier Ortega Desio | (yellow card) 51' to 61' |
| OF | 7 | Rodrigo Bruni |
| BF | 6 | Pablo Matera (c) |
| RL | 5 | Tomás Lavanini | | (substituted off) 62' |
| LL | 4 | Guido Petti |
| TP | 3 | Santiago Medrano |
| HK | 2 | Agustín Creevy | | (substituted off) 61' |
| LP | 1 | Santiago García Botta | | (substituted off) 67' |
Replacements:
| HK | 16 | Julián Montoya | | (substituted on) 61' |
| PR | 17 | Juan Pablo Zeiss | | (substituted on) 67' |
| PR | 18 | Lucio Sordoni |
| LK | 19 | Matias Alemanno | | (substituted on) 62' |
| N8 | 20 | Tomás Lezana |
| SH | 21 | Martín Landajo | | (substituted on) 50' |
| CE | 22 | Matías Orlando | | (substituted on) 24' |
| WG | 23 | Sebastián Cancelliere | | (substituted on) 72' |
Coach:
(Argentina) Mario Ledesma

24 November 2018
15:45 CET (UTC+1)

| Spain | 10–28 | Samoa |
| Try: Stewart 53' c Con: Levy (1/1) 54'; Pen: Peluchon 12' | | Try: Lam 38' c, 49' c Lee-Lo 58' c Fidow 68' c Con: Taulagi (4/4) 39', 50', 61' 69' |

Estadio Nacional Complutense, Madrid
Attendance: 10,800
Referee: Frank Murphy (Ireland)

24 November 2018
15:00 GMT (UTC+0)

| England | 37–18 | Australia |
| Try: May 3' c Daly 44' c Cokanasiga 56' c Farrell 76' c Con: Farrell (4/4) 4', 45', 57' 77'; Pen: Farrell 15', 34', 64' | Report | Try: Folau 36' c, 80+1' c Con: To'omua (1/2) 37'; Pen: To'omua 7', 41+2' |

Twickenham Stadium, London
Attendance: 81,275
Referee: Jaco Peyper (South Africa)

Team details

| FB | 15 | Elliot Daly |
| RW | 14 | Joe Cokanasiga |
| OC | 13 | Henry Slade | (substituted off) 69' |
| IC | 12 | Ben Te'o | (substituted off) 75' |
| LW | 11 | Jonny May |
| FH | 10 | Owen Farrell (c) |
| SH | 9 | Ben Youngs | (substituted off) 57' |
| N8 | 8 | Mark Wilson |
| OF | 7 | Sam Underhill | (substituted off) 75' |
| BF | 6 | Brad Shields |
| RL | 5 | Courtney Lawes | (substituted off) 77' |
| LL | 4 | Maro Itoje |
| TP | 3 | Kyle Sinckler | (substituted off) 57' |
| HK | 2 | Jamie George | (substituted off) 72' |
| LP | 1 | Ben Moon | (substituted off) 69' |
Replacements:
| HK | 16 | Dylan Hartley (c) | (substituted on) 72' |
| PR | 17 | Alec Hepburn | (substituted on) 69' |
| PR | 18 | Harry Williams | (substituted on) 57' |
| LK | 19 | Charlie Ewels | (substituted on) 77' |
| FL | 20 | Nathan Hughes | (substituted on) 75' |
| SH | 21 | Richard Wigglesworth | (substituted on) 57' |
| FH | 22 | George Ford | (substituted on) 75' |
| WG | 23 | Manu Tuilagi | (substituted on) 69' |
Coach:
(Australia) Eddie Jones

| FB | 15 | Israel Folau |
| RW | 14 | Dane Haylett-Petty |
| OC | 13 | Samu Kerevi |
| IC | 12 | Bernard Foley |
| LW | 11 | Jack Maddocks | (substituted off) 41' |
| FH | 10 | Matt To'omua |
| SH | 9 | Will Genia | (substituted off) 69' |
| N8 | 8 | Pete Samu | (substituted off) 57' |
| OF | 7 | Michael Hooper (c) |
| BF | 6 | Jack Dempsey |
| RL | 5 | Adam Coleman | (substituted off) 69' |
| LL | 4 | Izack Rodda |
| TP | 3 | Sekope Kepu | (substituted off) 57' |
| HK | 2 | Tolu Latu | (substituted off) 49' |
| LP | 1 | Scott Sio | (substituted off) 67' |
Replacements:
| HK | 16 | Tatafu Polota-Nau | (substituted on) 49' |
| PR | 17 | Jermaine Ainsley | (substituted on) 67' |
| PR | 18 | Allan Alaalatoa | (substituted on) 57' |
| LK | 19 | Rob Simmons | (substituted on) 69' |
| FL | 20 | Ned Hanigan | (substituted on) 57' |
| SH | 21 | Nick Phipps | (substituted on) 69' |
| CE | 22 | Sefa Naivalu | (substituted on) 41' | (substituted off) 69' |
| FB | 23 | Marika Koroibete | | (substituted on) 69' |
Coach:
(Australia) Michael Cheika

Man of the Match:
Kyle Sinckler (England)

24 November 2018
15:00 WET (UTC+0)

| Portugal | 23–29 | Namibia |
| Try: Vassalo 7' c Marta 40' c Con: Guedes (2/2) 7', 40'; Pen: Guedes 14', 25', 79' | Report | Try: Forbes 4' c Nortjé 37' c Greyling 49' c Tromp 66' m Con: Loubser (3/4) 4', 37', 49'; Pen: Loubser 15' |

Estádio Municipal Sérgio Conceição, Coimbra
Referee: Mike Adamson (Scotland)

24 November 2018
17:20 GMT (UTC+0)

| Wales | 20–11 | South Africa |
| Try: Francis 10' c L. Williams 16' c Con: Anscombe (2/2); Pen: Biggar (2) 69', 72' | Report | Try: Kriel 56' m Pen: Pollard 20'; Jantjies 62' |

Millennium Stadium, Cardiff
Attendance: 62,203
Referee: Luke Pearce (England)

Team details

| FB | 15 | Liam Williams |
| RW | 14 | George North | (substituted off) 46' |
| OC | 13 | Jonathan Davies |
| IC | 12 | Hadleigh Parkes | (substituted off) 77' |
| LW | 11 | Josh Adams |
| FH | 10 | Gareth Anscombe | (substituted off) 63' |
| SH | 9 | Gareth Davies | (substituted off) 58' |
| N8 | 8 | Ross Moriarty |
| OF | 7 | Justin Tipuric |
| BF | 6 | Ellis Jenkins |
| RL | 5 | Alun Wyn Jones (c) |
| LL | 4 | Adam Beard | (substituted off) 68' |
| TP | 3 | Tomas Francis | (substituted off) 53' |
| HK | 2 | Ken Owens | (substituted off) 53' |
| LP | 1 | Nicky Smith | (substituted off) 51' |
Replacements:
| HK | 16 | Elliot Dee | (substituted on) 53' |
| PR | 17 | Rob Evans | (substituted on) 51' |
| PR | 18 | Dillon Lewis | (substituted on) 53' |
| LK | 19 | Cory Hill | (substituted on) 68' |
| FL | 20 | Aaron Wainwright |
| SH | 21 | Tomos Williams | (substituted on) 58' |
| FH | 22 | Dan Biggar | (substituted on) 63' |
| FB | 23 | Owen Watkin | (substituted on) 77' |
Coach:
(New Zealand) Warren Gatland

| FB | 15 | Willie le Roux |
| RW | 14 | Cheslin Kolbe |
| OC | 13 | Jesse Kriel |
| IC | 12 | Damian de Allende | (substituted off) 46' |
| LW | 11 | Aphiwe Dyantyi |
| FH | 10 | Handré Pollard |
| SH | 9 | Embrose Papier | (substituted off) 51' |
| N8 | 8 | Duane Vermeulen | (substituted off) 65' |
| OF | 7 | Pieter-Steph du Toit |
| BF | 6 | Siya Kolisi (c) |
| RL | 5 | Franco Mostert |
| LL | 4 | RG Snyman |
| TP | 3 | Frans Malherbe | (substituted off) 47' |
| HK | 2 | Malcolm Marx | (substituted off) 54' |
| LP | 1 | Steven Kitshoff | (substituted off) 53' |
Replacements:
| HK | 16 | Bongi Mbonambi | (substituted on) 54' |
| PR | 17 | Thomas du Toit | (substituted on) 53' |
| PR | 18 | Vincent Koch | (substituted on) 47' |
| LK | 19 | Eben Etzebeth |
| LK | 20 | Francois Louw | (substituted on) 65' |
| SH | 21 | Ivan van Zyl | (substituted on) 51' |
| FH | 22 | Elton Jantjies | (substituted on) 46' |
| CE | 23 | Damian Willemse |
Coach:
(South Africa) Rassie Erasmus

Man of the Match:
Ellis Jenkins (Wales)

24 November 2018
18:30 WET (UTC+0)

| Ireland | 57–14 | United States |
| Try: Conway 2' c, 16' c, 76' c Conan 33' c Beirne 52' c McCloskey 58' m Roux 65' c Ryan 80' c Con: Carbery (7/8) 3', 17', 33', 52', 66', 76', 80'; Pen: Carbery 26' | Report | Try: Taufete'e 11' c, Penalty try 22'; Con: Magie (1/1) 12' |

Aviva Stadium, Dublin
Attendance: 51,000
Referee: Ben O'Keeffe (New Zealand)

Team details

| FB | 15 | Will Addison | (substituted off) 41' |
| RW | 14 | Andrew Conway |
| OC | 13 | Garry Ringrose |
| IC | 12 | Stuart McCloskey |
| LW | 11 | Darren Sweetnam | (substituted off) 26' |
| FH | 10 | Joey Carbery |
| SH | 9 | John Cooney | (substituted off) 60' |
| N8 | 8 | Jack Conan | (substituted off) 66' |
| OF | 7 | Jordi Murphy |
| BF | 6 | Rhys Ruddock (c) |
| RL | 5 | Iain Henderson | (substituted off) 57' |
| LL | 4 | Tadhg Beirne |
| TP | 3 | Finlay Bealham | (substituted off) 46' |
| HK | 2 | Niall Scannell | (substituted off) 57' |
| LP | 1 | Dave Kilcoyne | (substituted off) 60' |
Replacements:
| HK | 16 | Rob Herring | (substituted on) 57' |
| PR | 17 | Cian Healy | (substituted on) 60' |
| PR | 18 | John Ryan | (substituted on) 46' |
| LK | 19 | Quinn Roux | (substituted on) 57' |
| FL | 20 | Josh van der Flier | (substituted on) 66' |
| SH | 21 | Luke McGrath | (substituted on) 60' |
| FH | 22 | Ross Byrne | (substituted on) 26' |
| CE | 23 | Sammy Arnold | (substituted on) 41' |
Coach:
(New Zealand) Joe Schmidt

| FB | 15 | Will Hooley |
| RW | 14 | Blaine Scully (c) |
| OC | 13 | Bryce Campbell |
| IC | 12 | Paul Lasike |
| LW | 11 | Marcel Brache |
| FH | 10 | Will Magie |
| SH | 9 | Shaun Davies | (substituted off) 60' |
| N8 | 8 | Cameron Dolan |
| OF | 7 | Hanco Germishuys |
| BF | 6 | John Quill | (substituted off) 67' |
| RL | 5 | Nick Civetta |
| LL | 4 | Greg Peterson | (substituted off) 66' |
| TP | 3 | Paul Mullen | (substituted off) 60' |
| HK | 2 | Joe Taufete'e | (substituted off) 43' |
| LP | 1 | Titi Lamositele | (substituted off) 54' |
Replacements:
| HK | 16 | Dylan Fawsitt | (substituted on) 43' |
| PR | 17 | Chance Wenglewski | (substituted on) 54' |
| PR | 18 | Dino Waldren | (substituted on) 60' |
| LK | 19 | Samu Manoa | (substituted on) 66' |
| LK | 20 | David Tameilau | (substituted on) 67' |
| FL | 21 | Ruben de Haas | (substituted on) 60' |
| SH | 22 | Gannon Moore |
| FH | 23 | Ryan Matyas |
Coach:
(South Africa) Gary Gold

24 November 2018
21:05 CET (UTC+1)

| France | 14–21 | Fiji |
| Try: Guirado 25' c, 40+5' c Con: Serin (2/2) 25', 40+6' | Report | Try: Radradra 20' c Tuisova 31' m Con: Volavola (1/2) 21'; Pen: Volavola 44', 58', 80+1' |

Stade de France, Saint-Denis
Attendance: 42,200
Referee: Matthew Carley (England)

Team details

| FB | 15 | Benjamin Fall |
| RW | 14 | Teddy Thomas |
| OC | 13 | Mathieu Bastareaud |
| IC | 12 | Gaël Fickou | (substituted off) 71' |
| LW | 11 | Yoann Huget |
| FH | 10 | Camille Lopez | (substituted off) 77' |
| SH | 9 | Baptiste Serin | (substituted off) 52' |
| N8 | 8 | Louis Picamoles | (substituted off) 69' |
| OF | 7 | Arthur Iturria | (substituted off) 60' | (substituted on) 69' |
| BF | 6 | Wenceslas Lauret |
| RL | 5 | Yoann Maestri |
| LL | 4 | Sébastien Vahaamahina | (substituted off) 52' |
| TP | 3 | Rabah Slimani | (substituted off) 52' |
| HK | 2 | Guilhem Guirado (c) | (substituted off) 69' |
| LP | 1 | Jefferson Poirot | (substituted off) 59' |
Replacements:
| HK | 16 | Julien Marchand | (substituted on) 69' |
| PR | 17 | Dany Priso | (substituted on) 59' |
| PR | 18 | Demba Bamba | (substituted on) 52' |
| LK | 19 | Félix Lambey | (substituted on) 52' |
| FL | 20 | Kélian Galletier | (substituted on) 60' |
| SH | 21 | Antoine Dupont | (substituted on) 52' |
| FH | 22 | Anthony Belleau | (substituted on) 77' |
| CE | 23 | Geoffrey Doumayrou | (substituted on) 71' |
Coach:
(France) Jacques Brunel

| FB | 15 | Metuisela Talebula | (substituted off) 56' |
| RW | 14 | Josua Tuisova | (substituted off) 69' |
| OC | 13 | Semi Radradra |
| IC | 12 | Jale Vatubua |
| LW | 11 | Vereniki Goneva |
| FH | 10 | Ben Volavola |
| SH | 9 | Frank Lomani | (substituted off) 67' |
| N8 | 8 | Viliame Mata | (substituted off) 51' |
| OF | 7 | Peceli Yato |
| BF | 6 | Dominiko Waqaniburotu (c) |
| RL | 5 | Leone Nakarawa |
| LL | 4 | Tevita Cavubati | (substituted off) 65' |
| TP | 3 | Manasa Saulo | (substituted off) 50' |
| HK | 2 | Sam Matavesi | (substituted off) 76' |
| LP | 1 | Campese Ma'afu | (substituted off) 50' |
Replacements:
| HK | 16 | Mesulame Dolokoto | (substituted on) 76' |
| PR | 17 | Eroni Mawi | (substituted on) 50' |
| PR | 18 | Kalivati Tawake | (substituted on) 50' |
| LK | 19 | Albert Tuisue | (substituted on) 65' |
| FL | 20 | Semi Kunatani | (substituted on) 51' |
| SH | 21 | Henry Seniloli | (substituted on) 67' |
| FH | 22 | Alivereti Veitokani | (substituted on) 56' |
| CE | 23 | Eroni Sau | (substituted on) 69' |
Coach:
(New Zealand) John McKee

=== 1 December ===
1 December 2018
14:30 GMT (UTC+0)

| Barbarians | 38–35 | Argentina |
| Try: Leguizamón 2' c Penalty try 34'; Kolisi 48' c De Allende 58' c De Jager 75'; Con: Pollard (2/2) 3', 49'; Jantjies (2/2) 59', 76'; Drop: Jantjies 79' | Report | Try: Orlando 9' c Moyano 16' c Matera 19' c Cancelliere 24'; Montoya 55'; Con: Díaz Bonilla (5/5) 10', 17', 20', 25', 56' |

Twickenham Stadium, London
Referee: John Lacey (Ireland)

== See also ==
- 2018 mid-year rugby union internationals
- 2019 Rugby World Cup qualification – Repechage
