= Ghindărești =

Ghindărești Новенькое
- Commune
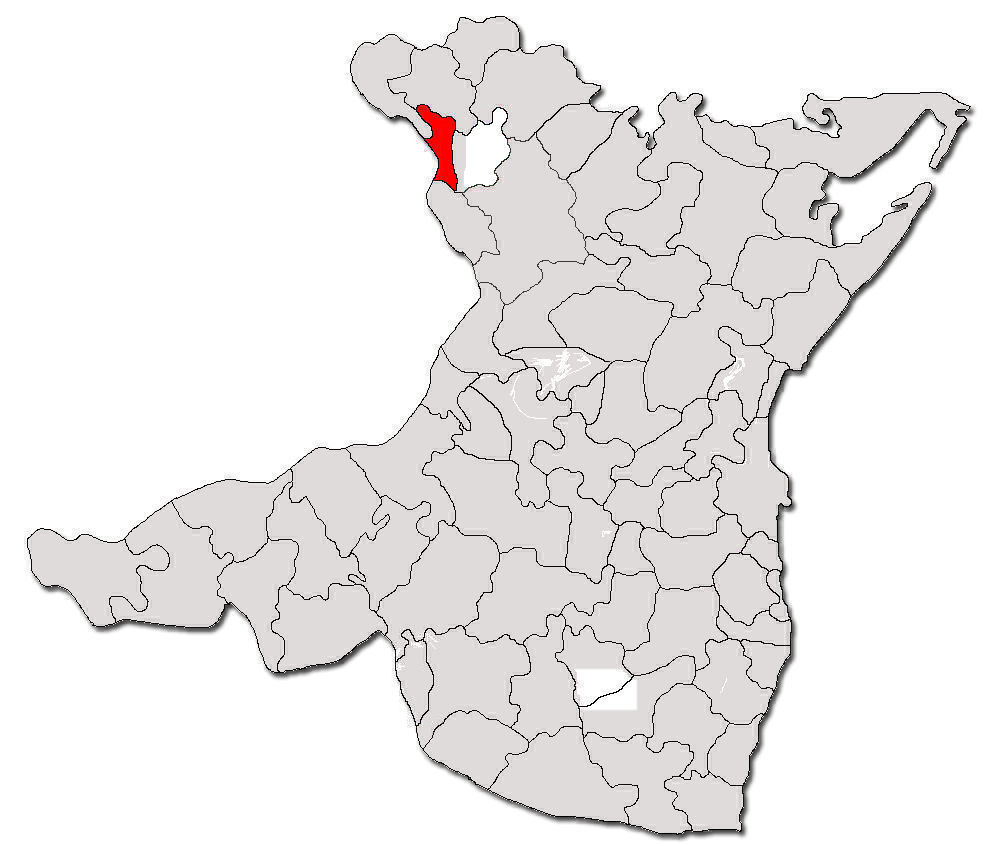
- Location in Constanța County

- Location in Romania
- Coordinates: 44°39′N 28°2′E
- Country: Romania
- County: Constanța

Government
  - Mayor (2020–2024): Vasile Simion (PNL)
- Area: 14.59 km^{2} (5.63 sq mi)
- Population (2021-12-01): 2,557
  - Density: 175.3/km^{2} (453.9/sq mi)
- Time zone: UTC+02:00 (EET)
  - Summer (DST): UTC+03:00 (EEST)
- Vehicle reg.: CT
- Website: www.primaria-ghindaresti.ro

Ghindărești (Romanian pronunciation: [ɡindəˈreʃtʲ]; formerly Ghizdărești, Russian: Новенькое) is a commune in Constanța County, Northern Dobruja, Romania, including the village with the same name.

== Demographics ==
At the 2011 census, 94.5% of inhabitants (1,865) were Russians or Lipovans and 2.2% (43) Romanians. At the 2002 census, 95.9% were Lipovan Orthodox and 3.7% Romanian Orthodox.

== Natives ==
- Ionel Melinte
