= Braam Steyn =

Italy international rugby union player

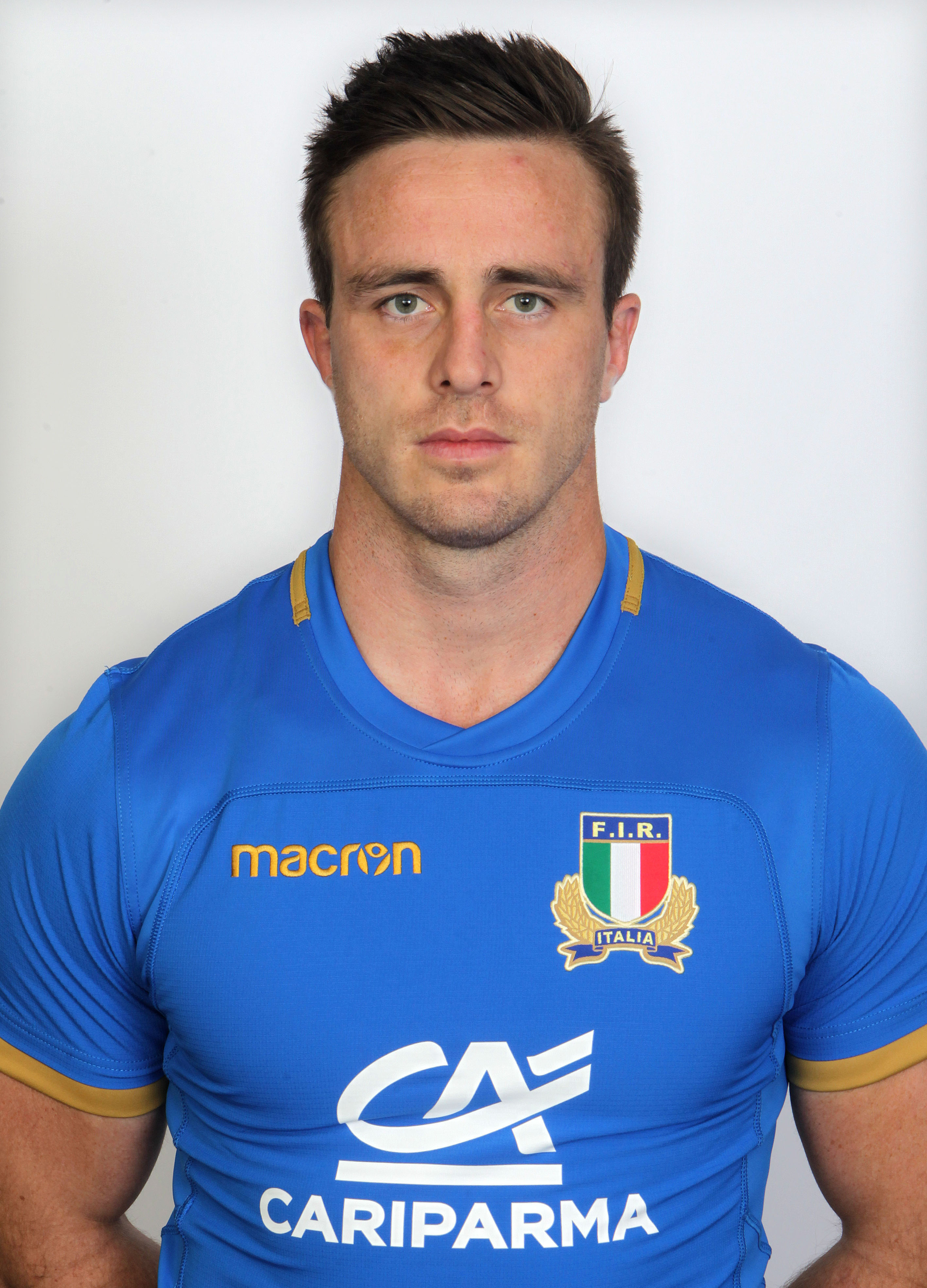
- Steyn in 2017
- Full name: Abraham Jurgen Steyn
- Born: 2 May 1992 (age 34) Cradock, Eastern Cape, South Africa
- Height: 1.93 m (6 ft 4 in)
- Weight: 110 kg (17 st 5 lb; 243 lb)
- School: Paul Roos Gymnasium

Rugby union career
- Position: Flanker
- Current team: Benetton
Youth career
- 2009−2012: Natal Sharks
Senior career
Years	Team	Apps	(Points)
2012	Natal Sharks	2	(0)
2012−2013	Mogliano	13	(25)
2013−2015	Calvisano	41	(140)
2014	→Zebre	2	(0)
2015−2023	Benetton	98	(60)
- Correct as of 28 Oct 2022
International career
Years	Team	Apps	(Points)
2012	S.A. Under 20	2	(5)
2016−	Italy	50	(15)
2021	Italy A	1	(0)
- Correct as of 19 Mar 2022

Abraham Jurgen Steyn (born 2 May 1992) is a South African-born rugby union player who plays for the Italy national rugby union team. His usual position is as a flanker, and he currently plays for Benetton.

Under contract with Calvisano, for 2014–15 Pro12 season, he was named as Permit Player for Zebre in Pro 12. In 2015, Steyn signed for Benetton and he played for Treviso until 2022−23 season.

In 2012, he played for S.A. Under 20. From 2016, he is member of Italy squad and on 18 August 2019, he was named in the final 31-man squad for the 2019 Rugby World Cup. On 8 November 2021, he was named in the Italy A squad for the 2021 end-of-year rugby union internationals.
