= Ionel Melinte =

Romania international rugby union player

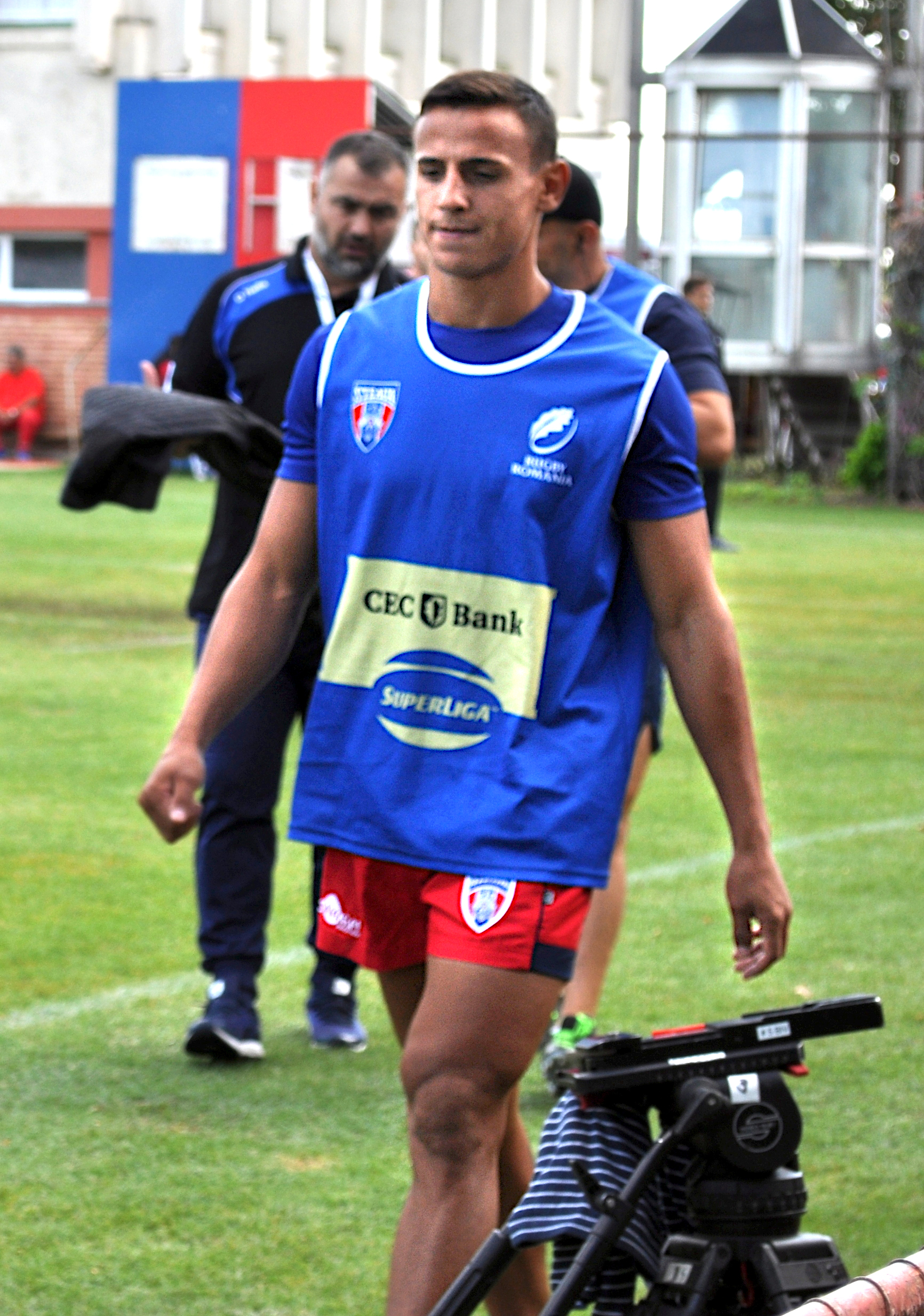
- Melinte representing CSA Steaua in the 2017–18 SuperLiga, September 2017
- Born: 31 January 1996 (age 30) Ghindărești, Romania
- Height: 179 cm (5 ft 10 in)
- Weight: 83 kg (183 lb; 13 st 1 lb)

Rugby union career
- Position: Fullback
- Current team: Le Rugby Club Hyères La Crau Carqueiranne, France
Senior career
Years	Team	Apps	(Points)
2016–2019	CSA Steaua	32	(183)
2019–2021	CS SCM Timișoara	13	(68)
2021–	RCHCC		
- Correct as of 4 April 2023
International career
Years	Team	Apps	(Points)
2018–	Romania	28	(173)
- Correct as of 4 April 2023

Ionel Melinte (born 31 January 1996) is a Romanian rugby union football player. He plays as a fullback for professional Le Rugby Club Hyères La Crau Carqueiranne.

== Club career ==
Ionel Melinte started playing rugby as a youth for CS Cleopatra Mamaia at age 16 and after three years he moved to Bucharest to finish his junior years with giants Steaua. After one year he joined the senior squad of Steaua where he played for three seasons. In 2019 he was signed by Timișoara Saracens.

== International career ==
In November 2018, Melinte was called for Romania's national team, the Oaks, being part of the 34 man squad assembled in preparation for a match against the Os Lobos held for the Relegation/Promotion Play-Off of the 2018 Rugby Europe Championship, making his test debut on this occasion.
