= Evan Lloyd (rugby union, born 2000) =

Welsh rugby union player (born 2000)

- Born: 2 June 2000 (age 26) Wales
- Height: 1.85 m (6 ft 1 in)
- Weight: 91 kg (14.3 st; 201 lb)

Rugby union career
- Position(s): Fly-half; Fullback
Senior career
Years	Team	Apps	(Points)
2020–	Dragons	3	(0)
- Correct as of 25 April 2020

Evan Lloyd (born 2 June 2000) is a Welsh rugby union player, currently playing for Pro14 side Dragons. His preferred position is fly-half or fullback.

== Dragons ==
Lloyd was named in the Dragons transition squad for the 2020–21 Pro14 season. He made his Dragons debut in Round 2 of the 2020–21 European Rugby Champions Cup against Bordeaux Bègles.
