= Clément Laporte =

French rugby union player (born 2004)

- Born: January 7, 1998 (age 28) Pessac, France
- Height: 1.80 m (5 ft 11 in)
- Weight: 84 kg (13 st 3 lb; 185 lb)

Rugby union career
- Position(s): Full-back, wing
- Current team: Section Paloise
Youth career
- 2006–2013: Parentis SR
- 2013–2015: Union Bordeaux Bègles
- 2015–2019: SU Agen
Senior career
Years	Team	Apps	(Points)
2017–2019	SU Agen	16	(20)
2019–2022	Lyon OU	30	(20)
2016–2017	Section Paloise	27	(35)
2015–	Total	103	(75)
- Correct as of April 4, 2024
International career
Years	Team	Apps	(Points)
2016–2018	France U20	7	(0)
2019–2021	French Barbarians	2	(5)
- Correct as of April 4, 2024

Clément Laporte (born January 7, 1998) is a French rugby union player who plays as a full back or wing for Section Paloise in the Top 14 competition. He made his Top 14 debut with his club on September 30, 2017.

== Playing career ==
Clément Laporte began playing rugby in 2006 with Parentis Sport Rugby. In 2013, he joined the youth academy of Union Bordeaux Bègles before transferring to the SU Agen youth academy in 2015.

=== Club career ===
==== SU Agen (2017-2019) ====
Clément Laporte debuted for SU Agen's first team in the Top 14 on September 30, 2017, against Stade Toulousain. During his first professional season, he played 16 Top 14 matches and scored 2 tries, along with two EPCR Challenge Cup matches.

Clément Laporte made his debut for the SU Agen first team during the 6th round of the Top 14 on September 30, 2017, against as a starter. He scored his first try in the Top 14 on November 18, 2017, against Union Bordeaux Bègles. In his first professional season, he played 16 Top 14 matches and scored 2 tries, along with two EPCR Challenge Cup matches.

In July 2018, he signed an espoir (young talent) contract with SU Agen until 2020.

During the 2018–2019 season, he played 25 Top 14 matches and scored two tries. He also played three EPCR Challenge Cup matches.

In November 2018, he was selected for the French Barbarians to face Tonga at Stade Chaban-Delmas in Bordeaux. Starting as a wing, he scored a try during the match. The Baa-Baas lost 38–49 against Tonga.

In January 2019, Lyon OU announced that Clément Laporte would join the club starting from the 2019–2020 season.

==== Lyon OU (2019-2022) ====
During the 2019–2020 season, he only played one match in September 2019 against RC Toulon.

In November 2021, he was once again called up to the French Barbarians to face Tonga at Matmut Stadium in Lyon. The Baa-Baas won 42–17 with six tries scored.

During the following two seasons, he played only twenty Top 14 matches and six European Cup matches.

==== Section Paloise (since 2022) ====
During the 2022 offseason, he signed with Section Paloise until 2025.

He played his first match with Pau in the opening round of the Top 14 against USA Perpignan as a starter. In December 2022, during the match against CA Brive, he suffered a medial collateral ligament sprain in his knee and was sidelined for six weeks. He returned to competition at the end of January 2023 for the last Challenge Cup match against the Cheetahs. During the 2022–2023 season, Laporte played 20 Top 14 matches and scored 6 tries, primarily as a winger.

During the 2023–2024 season, he scored his first try of the season in the 3rd round against Lyon OU. Laporte established himself as a winger but also became a credible alternative for the full-back position.

However, during the 7th round of the 2023-2024 Top 14 season, Section Paloise faced Aviron Bayonnais as co-leaders of the league. Clément Laporte ruptured his Achilles tendon just 4 minutes into the game. He underwent surgery, and his season came to an end.

=== International career ===
In 2018, he won the World Rugby U20 Championship with France.

In December 2020, he was called up by Fabien Galthié to the French national team to prepare for the Autumn Nations Cup final against England.
