= Samuela Anise =

Japan international rugby union player

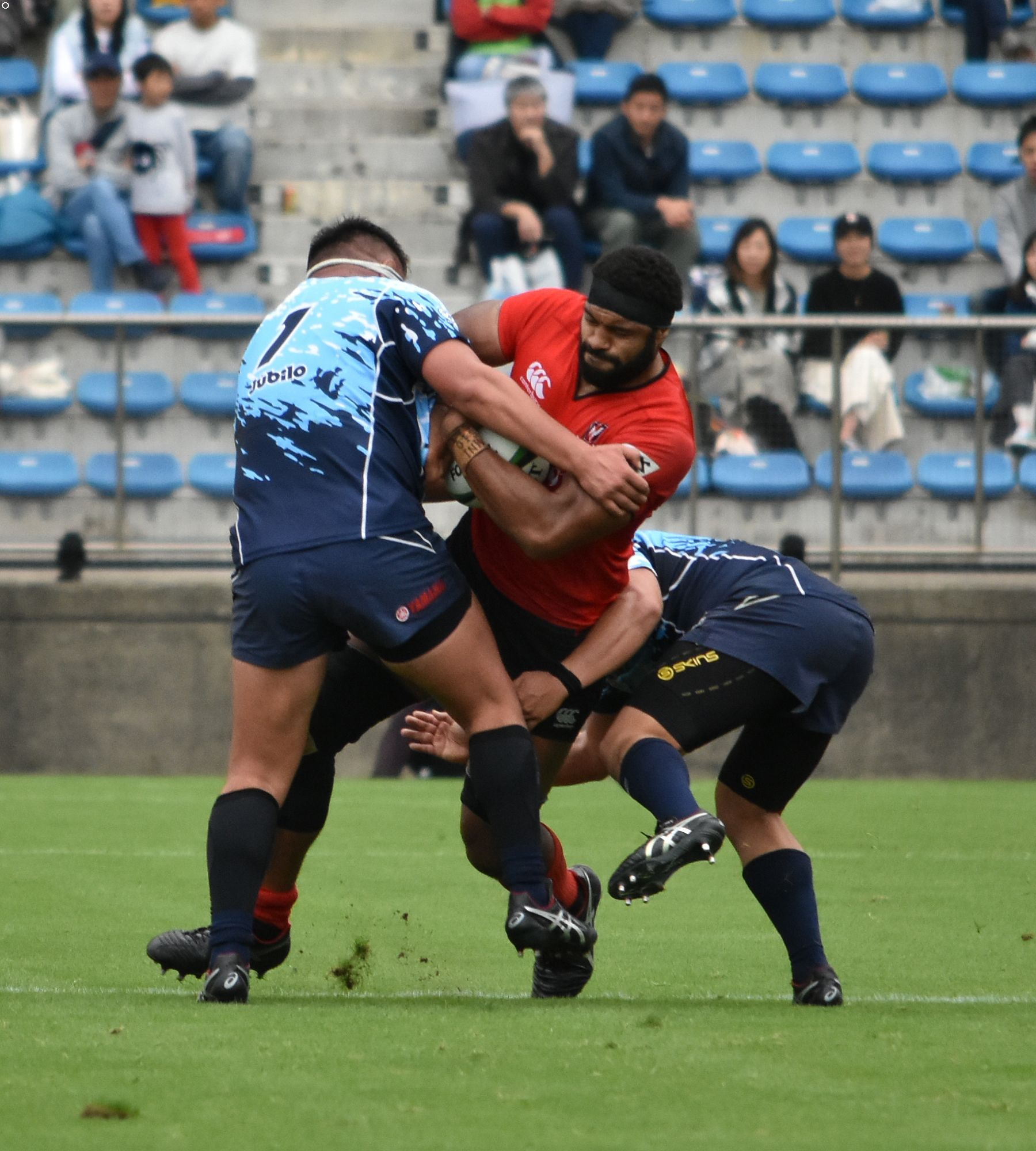
- Full name: Samuela Lagilagi Anise
- Born: 13 August 1986 (age 40) Suva, Fiji
- Height: 1.98 m (6 ft 6 in)
- Weight: 118 kg (18 st 8 lb; 260 lb)
- School: Suva Grammar School
- University: Fiji National University

Rugby union career
- Position: Lock
Senior career
Years	Team	Apps	(Points)
2008–2016	Hino Red Dolphins		
2016–2022	Canon Eagles	56	(15)
2022-2023	Shizuoka Blue Revs	14	(0)
2023-2025	Toshiba Brave Lupus	26	(0)
- Correct as of 20 February 2020
International career
Years	Team	Apps	(Points)
2016–2018	Japan	12	(10)
- Correct as of 20 February 2020

Samuela Anise (アニセサムエラ, Anise Samuera; born 13 August 1986) is a Fijian-born, Japanese international rugby union player who plays as a lock. He currently plays for the Shizuoka Blue Revs in Japan's domestic Japan Rugby League One.

== Club career ==
Anise signed for Top League side, the Canon Eagles ahead of the 2016-17 season and instantly established himself as a regular starter with his new side.

== International ==
After only 9 Top League games, Anise received his first call-up to his adopted country, Japan's senior squad ahead of the 2016 end-of-year rugby union internationals. He debuted in the number 5 jersey in new head coach, Jamie Joseph's first game, a 54–20 loss at home to Argentina.
