= Alun Lawrence =

Welsh rugby union footballer

- Born: Alun Lawrence; 15 September 1998 (age 28) Pontypridd, Wales
- Height: 191 cm (6 ft 3 in)
- Weight: 112 kg (17 st 9 lb)
- School: Coleg y Cymoedd

Rugby union career
- Position: Number 8
- Current team: Cardiff Rugby
Senior career
Years	Team	Apps	(Points)
2019–2022	Cardiff Blues	25	(5)
2022–2023	Jersey Reds	15	(15)
2023–	Cardiff Rugby	34	(5)
International career
Years	Team	Apps	(Points)
2018	Wales U20	2	(0)

Alun Lawrence (born 15 September 1998) is a Welsh rugby union player who plays for Cardiff Rugby as a back rower. He was a Wales under-20 international.

Lawrence made his debut for the Cardiff Blues regional team in 2019 having previously played for the Blues academy.
