= 2019 Americas Rugby Championship =

- Date: 2 February – 9 March 2019
- Countries: Argentina XV; Brazil; Canada; Chile; United States; Uruguay

Final positions
- Champions: Argentina (2nd title)

Tournament statistics
- Matches played: 15
- Top scorer(s): (Brazil) Josh Reeves (54)
- Most tries: (United States) Joe Taufeteʻe

The 2019 Americas Rugby Championship is the fourth series of the Americas Rugby Championship, the top level rugby union competition for Americas nations.

== Participants ==
Nation	Stadium			Head coach	Captain(s)
Nation	Home stadium	Capacity	City	Head coach	Captain(s)
Argentina XV	Neuquén Rugby Club	3,500	Neuquén	(Argentina) Ignacio Fernández Lobbe	Lautaro Bavaro
Argentina XV	Marabunta Rugby Club	3,500	Cipolletti	(Argentina) Ignacio Fernández Lobbe	Lautaro Bavaro
Argentina XV	José Amalfitani Stadium	49,540	Buenos Aires	(Argentina) Ignacio Fernández Lobbe	Lautaro Bavaro
Brazil	Estádio Martins Pereira	15,317	São José dos Campos	(Argentina) Rodolfo Ambrosio	Felipe Sancery
Brazil	Estádio Jayme Cintra	15,000	Jundiaí	(Argentina) Rodolfo Ambrosio	Felipe Sancery
Canada	Westhills Stadium	1,718	Langford	(Wales) Kingsley Jones	Lucas Rumball
Canada	Starfire Sports	4,500	Tukwila	(Wales) Kingsley Jones	Lucas Rumball
Chile	Estadio Santiago Bueras	3,400	Santiago	(Uruguay) Pablo Lemoine	Martín Sigren
United States	Dell Diamond	4,000	Round Rock	(South Africa) Gary Gold	Marcel Brache
United States	Starfire Sports	4,500	Tukwila	(South Africa) Gary Gold	Marcel Brache
Uruguay	Estadio Charrúa	14,000	Montevideo	(Argentina) Esteban Meneses	Juan Manuel Gaminara

1. A:Canada will host one of their three scheduled "home" matches at Starfire Sports in the Seattle suburb of Tukwila, Washington.

== Table ==
Pos	Nation (rank)	Games				Points			Tries	Bonus points		Table points
Pos	Nation (rank)	Played	Won	Drawn	Lost	For	Against	Diff	Tries	4 tries	7 Pts loss	Table points
1	Argentina XV	5	5	0	0	258	60	+198	38	5	0	25
2	Uruguay (17)	5	4	0	1	124	102	+22	16	2	0	18
3	United States (12)	5	3	0	2	173	148	+25	25	4	1	17
4	Brazil (28)	5	2	0	3	84	149	–65	6	0	1	9
5	Canada (20)	5	1	0	4	131	107	+24	16	1	2	7
6	Chile (29)	5	0	0	5	33	247	–214	4	0	1	1
Points are awarded to the teams as follows: Win - 4 points Draw - 2 points 4 or more tries - 1 point Loss within 7 points - 1 point Loss greater than 7 points - 0 points Rank refers to World Rugby Rankings before the start of the tournament

== Fixtures ==
The tournament was played in a round-robin format, with each team playing the five others once. The fixtures were announced on 5 November 2018.

=== Week 1 ===
2 February
15:00 (UTC−03:00)

Chile	8–71	United States
Try: Matías Dittus 49'; Con: Francisco Urroz (0/1); Pen: Francisco Gonzalez Moller (1/1) 16'	Rugbiers Report; WR Report; USAR Report; ARN Report	Try: Joe Taufeteʻe 2'; AJ MacGinty 5', 46', 64'; Paul Lasike 21'; Nick Civetta 26'; Shaun Davies 29'; Hanco Germishuys 40+1'; Tadhg Leader 68'; Ruben de Haas 74'; Cam Dolan 80+1'; Con: AJ MacGinty (5/7) 6', 27', 30', 46', 65'; Will Magie (1/1) 22'; Tadhg Leader (2/3) 69', 80+2'

Estadio Santiago Bueras, Maipu, Chile
Referee: Damián Schneider (Argentina)

FB	15	Tomás Ianiszewski		(substituted off) 17'
RW	14	José Ignacio Larenas
OC	13	Christian Huerta
IC	12	Vicente Ayarza
LW	11	Gonzalo Lara
FH	10	Francisco González Moller		(substituted off) 48'
SH	9	Domingo Saavedra		(substituted off) 47'
N8	8	Jaden Laing		(substituted off) 40'
OF	7	Ignacio Silva
BF	6	Martín Sigren (c)
RL	5	Clemente Saavedra		(substituted off) 40'
LL	4	Bastián Burguener		(substituted off) 51'
TP	3	Nicolás Ovalle	(substituted off) 32'	(substituted on) 66'
HK	2	Tomás Dussaillant
LP	1	Francisco Pizarro		(substituted off) 32'
Replacements:
HK	16	Augusto Böhme	(substituted on) 51'	(substituted off) 66'
PR	17	Javier Carrasco		(substituted on) 32'
PR	18	Matías Dittus		(substituted on) 32'	(yellow card) 80' to 80+2'
LK	19	Javier Eissmann		(substituted on) 40'
LK	20	Thomas Orchard		(substituted on) 40'
SH	21	Juan Pablo Larenas		(substituted on) 47'
FH	22	Francisco Urroz		(substituted on) 17'
WG	23	Julio Blanc		(substituted on) 48'	(yellow card) 77' to 80+1'
Coach:
(Uruguay) Pablo Lemoine

FB	15	Will Magie
RW	14	Gannon Moore
OC	13	Bryce Campbell
IC	12	Paul Lasike	(substituted off) 66'
LW	11	Marcel Brache (c)
FH	10	AJ MacGinty	(substituted off) 66'
SH	9	Shaun Davies	(substituted off) 54'
N8	8	Cam Dolan
OF	7	Hanco Germishuys
BF	6	John Quill	(substituted off) 56'
RL	5	Nick Civetta	(substituted off) 63'
LL	4	Greg Peterson
TP	3	Dino Waldren	(substituted off) 51'
HK	2	Joe Taufeteʻe	(substituted off) 66'
LP	1	Titi Lamositele	(substituted off) 66'
Replacements:
HK	16	James Hilterbrand	(substituted on) 66'
PR	17	Chance Wenglewski	(substituted on) 51'
PR	18	Paul Mullen	(substituted on) 66'
LK	19	Nate Brakeley	(substituted on) 63'
FL	20	David Tameilau	(substituted on) 56'
SH	21	Ruben de Haas	(substituted on) 54'
FH	22	Tadhg Leader	(substituted on) 66'
FB	23	Dylan Audsley	(substituted on) 66'
Coach:
(South Africa) Gary Gold

Touch judges:
Frank Méndez (Chile)
Luis Díaz (Chile)
Television Match Official
Gabriel Pinter (Argentina)

Notes:

- Francisco Pizarro, Matías Dittus, Nicolás Ovalle, Javier Carrasco, Javier Eissmann, Jaden Laing, Christian Huerta, Gonzalo Lara, Augusto Böhme and Julio Blanc (all Chile) and Tadhg Leader (United States) made their international debuts.
- With his try in this match, the United States' Joe Taufeteʻe tied Ireland's Keith Wood for the most career Test tries by a player in the tight five with 15. Taufeteʻe reached the mark in his 20th international appearance, compared to 63 for Wood.

2 February
17:00 (UTC−03:00)

Argentina XV	54–3	Brazil
Try: Felipe Ezcurra 5'; Jerónimo Ureta 10'; Gaspar Baldunciel 21'; Lucas Mensa 34', 55'; Julián Domínguez 58'; Javier Corvalán 70'; Agustín Segura 78'; Con: Martín Elías (5/6) 6', 11', 35', 56', 60'; Martín Roger 71', 79'	WR Report; ARN Report	Pen: Josh Reeves (1/1) 14'

Neuquén Rugby Club, Neuquén, Neuquén Province
Referee: Joaquín Montes (Uruguay)

FB	15	Santiago Carreras	(substituted off) 60'
RW	14	Matías Osadczuk
OC	13	Agustín Segura
IC	12	Lucas Mensa
LW	11	Julián Domínguez
FH	10	Martín Elías	(substituted off) 63'
SH	9	Felipe Ezcurra	(substituted off) 63'
N8	8	Nicolás Sbrocco	(substituted off) 56'
OF	7	Lautaro Bavaro (c)
BF	6	Francisco Gorrissen
RL	5	Franco Molina	(substituted off) 63'
LL	4	Jerónimo Ureta
TP	3	Lucas Favre	(substituted off) 63'
HK	2	Gaspar Baldunciel	(substituted off) 53'
LP	1	Nicolás Solveyra	(substituted off) 63'
Replacements:
HK	16	Axel Zapata	(substituted on) 53'
PR	17	Javier Corvalán	(substituted on) 63'
PR	18	Martín Fernández Segurotti	(substituted on) 63'
N8	19	Santiago Portillo	(substituted on) 63'
FL	20	Benito Ortíz de Rosas	(substituted on) 56'
SH	21	Gregorio del Prete	(substituted on) 63'
FH	22	Martín Roger	(substituted on) 63'
FB	23	Facundo Cordero	(substituted on) 60'
Coach:
(Argentina) Ignacio Fernández Lobbe

FB	15	Daniel Sancery
RW	14	Lucas Tranquez		(substituted off) 64'
OC	13	Felipe Sancery (c)
IC	12	Moisés Duque
LW	11	De Wet van Niekerk	(yellow card) 21' to 31'	(substituted off) 56'
FH	10	Josh Reeves
SH	9	Lucas Duque		(substituted off) 63'
N8	8	Arthur Bergo
OF	7	Cléber Dias
BF	6	Michael Moraes		(substituted off) 36'
RL	5	Luiz Vieira
LL	4	Lucas Piero		(substituted off) 40'
TP	3	Jardel Vettorato		(substituted off) 60'
HK	2	Endy Willian		(substituted off) 53'
LP	1	Lucas Abud		(substituted off) 67'
Replacements:
HK	16	Walter Schildberg		(substituted on) 53'
PR	17	Caíque Silva		(substituted on) 67'
PR	18	Pedro Bengaló		(substituted on) 60'
LK	19	Gabriel Paganini		(substituted on) 40'
N8	20	André Arruda		(substituted on) 36'
SH	21	Douglas Rauth		(substituted on) 63'
WG	22	Stefano Giantorno		(substituted on) 56'
WG	23	Robert Tenório		(substituted on) 64'
Coach:
(Argentina) Rodolfo Ambrosio

Touch judges:
Esteban Filipanics (Argentina)
Juan Manuel Martínez (Argentina)
Television Match Official
Martín González Deibe (Argentina)

2 February
21:40 (UTC−03:00)

Uruguay	20–17	Canada
Try: Federico Favaro 13'; Ignacio Dotti 69'; Guillermo Pujadas 80'; Con: Federico Favaro (0/1); Juan Manuel Cat (0/1); Andrés De León (1/1) 81'; Pen: Juan Manuel Cat (1/1) 25'	WR Report; ARN Report	Try: Ciaran Hearn 37'; Theo Sauder 41'; Jamie Mackenzie 61'; Con: Theo Sauder (1/3) 42'; Pen: Theo Sauder (0/2)

Estadio Charrúa, Montevideo
Attendance: 2,000
Referee: Federico Anselmi (Argentina)

FB	15	Rodrigo Silva
RW	14	Federico Favaro		(substituted off) 20'
OC	13	Joaquín Prada
IC	12	Andrés Vilaseca
LW	11	Nicolás Freitas		(substituted off) 70'
FH	10	Juan Manuel Cat		(substituted off) 70'
SH	9	Santiago Arata	(red card) 16'
N8	8	Alejandro Nieto
OF	7	Juan Diego Ormaechea		(substituted off) 59'
BF	6	Juan Manuel Gaminara (c)
RL	5	Diego Magno		(substituted off) 63'
LL	4	Ignacio Dotti		(substituted off) 73'
TP	3	Mario Sagario		(substituted off) 57'
HK	2	Germán Kessler
LP	1	Mateo Sanguinetti		(substituted off) 63'
Replacements:
PR	16	Guillermo Pujadas		(substituted on) 73'
HK	17	Facundo Gattas		(substituted on) 63'
PR	18	Juan Echeverría		(substituted on) 57'
FL	19	Gonzalo Soto Mera		(substituted on) 63'
FL	20	Leandro Segredo		(substituted on) 59'
SH	21	Tomás Inciarte		(substituted on) 20'
FH	22	Andrés De León		(substituted on) 70'
CE	23	Agustín Della Corte		(substituted on) 70'
Coach:
(Argentina) Esteban Meneses

FB	15	Theo Sauder
RW	14	Andrew Coe		(substituted off) 66'
OC	13	Ben LeSage	(yellow card) 54' to 64'
IC	12	Ciaran Hearn
LW	11	Kainoa Lloyd
FH	10	Pat Parfrey
SH	9	Jamie Mackenzie
N8	8	Luke Campbell
OF	7	Lucas Rumball (c)
BF	6	Kyle Baillie
RL	5	Josh Larsen		(substituted off) 50'
LL	4	Conor Keys		(substituted off) 70'
TP	3	Matt Tierney
HK	2	Eric Howard
LP	1	Djustice Sears-Duru		(substituted off) 73'
Replacements:
PR	16	Noah Barker		(substituted on) 73'
PR	17	Ryan Kotlewski
PR	18	Cole Keith
LK	19	Mike Sheppard		(substituted on) 50'
N8	20	Dustin Dobravsky
FL	21	Nakai Penny		(substituted on) 70'
SH	22	Will Percillier
CE	23	Nick Blevins		(substituted on) 66'
Coach:
Kingsley Jones

Touch judges:
Francisco González (Uruguay)
Santiago Romero (Uruguay)
Television Match Official
Alejandro Longres (Uruguay)

=== Week 2 ===
8 February
20:10 (UTC−03:00)

Uruguay	20–5	Chile
Try: Joaquín Prada 28'; Diego Magno 59'; Con: Andrés Vilaseca (2/2) 29', 60'; Pen: Andrés Vilaseca (2/2) 18', 41'	WR Report; Rugbiers Report; ARN Report	Try: Augusto Böhme 53'; Con: Francisco González Moller (0/1); Pen: Francisco González Moller (0/1)

Estadio Charrúa, Montevideo
Attendance: 3,000
Referee: Federico Anselmi (Argentina)

FB	15	Gastón Mieres	(substituted off) 66'
RW	14	Leandro Leivas	(substituted off) 56'
OC	13	Joaquín Prada
IC	12	Andrés Vilaseca
LW	11	Nicolás Freitas
FH	10	Juan Manuel Cat
SH	9	Tomás Inciarte	(substituted off) 68'
N8	8	Alejandro Nieto	(substituted off) 55'
OF	7	Juan Diego Ormaechea
BF	6	Juan Manuel Gaminara (c)
RL	5	Diego Magno
LL	4	Juan Manuel Rodríguez	(substituted off) 50'
TP	3	Mario Sagario	(substituted off) 58'
HK	2	Germán Kessler	(substituted off) 69'
LP	1	Mateo Sanguinetti	(substituted off) 58'
Replacements:
HK	16	Guillermo Pujadas	(substituted on) 69'
PR	17	Facundo Gattas	(substituted on) 58'
PR	18	Juan Echeverría	(substituted on) 58'
FL	19	Gonzalo Soto Mera	(substituted on) 50'
N8	20	Manuel Diana	(substituted on) 55'
SH	21	Joaquín Alonso	(substituted on) 68'
WG	22	Federico Favaro	(substituted on) 56'
FB	23	Manuel Blengio	(substituted on) 66'
Coach:
(Argentina) Esteban Meneses

FB	15	Christian Huerta
RW	14	Pablo Metuaze
OC	13	José Ignacio Larenas	(yellow card) 80' to 80'
IC	12	Vicente Ayarza
LW	11	Julio Blanc	(yellow card) 63' to 73'
FH	10	Francisco González Moller
SH	9	Juan Pablo Larenas		(substituted off) 69'
N8	8	Ignacio Silva		(substituted off) 78'
OF	7	Thomas Orchard		(substituted on) 75'
BF	6	Martín Sigren (c)
RL	5	Javier Eissmann		(substituted off) 62'
LL	4	Bastián Burguener		(substituted off) 73'
TP	3	Matías Dittus		(substituted off) 40'
HK	2	Tomás Dussaillant		(substituted off) 32'
LP	1	Javier Carrasco		(substituted off) 67'
Replacements:
HK	16	Augusto Böhme		(substituted on) 32'
PR	17	Nicolás Ovalle		(substituted on) 40'
PR	18	Mauricio Gómez		(substituted on) 73'
PR	19	Marcelo Huerta		(substituted on) 67'
N8	20	Jaden Laing		(substituted on) 78'
LO	21	Clemente Saavedra		(substituted on) 62'
N8	22	Camilo Sánchez		(substituted on) 75'
SH	23	Domingo Saavedra		(substituted on) 69'
Coach:
(Uruguay) Pablo Lemoine

Touch judges:
Joaquín Montes (Uruguay)
Santiago Romero (Uruguay)
Television Match Official
Francisco Pesce (Uruguay)

Notes:

- Marcelo Huerta, Camilo Sánchez and Mauricio Gómez (Chile) made their international debuts.

9 February
17:00 (UTC−03:00)

Argentina XV	45–14	United States
Try: Santiago Carreras (2) 0', 46'; Lucas Favre 7'; Gaspar Baldunciel 28'; Felipe Ezcurra 53'; Julián Domínguez 56'; Lautaro Bavaro 73'; Con: Martín Elías (5/6) 1', 7', 29', 54', 57'; Teo Castiglioni (0/1)	WR Report; ARN Report	Try: Penalty Try 77'; Dylan Fawsitt 79'; Con: Will Magie (1/1) 80'

Marabunta Rugby Club, Cipolletti, Río Negro Province
Referee: Francisco González (Uruguay)

FB	15	Santiago Carreras
RW	14	Matías Osadczuk
OC	13	Agustín Segura		(substituted off) 58'
IC	12	Lucas Mensa	(yellow card) 50' to 60'
LW	11	Julián Domínguez		(substituted off) 58'
FH	10	Martín Elías
SH	9	Felipe Ezcurra		(substituted off) 59'
N8	8	Nicolás Sbrocco		(substituted off) 21'
OF	7	Lautaro Bavaro (c)
BF	6	Francisco Gorrissen
RL	5	Franco Molina		(substituted off) 55'
LL	4	Jerónimo Ureta	(yellow card) 77' to 80'
TP	3	Lucas Favre		(substituted off) 58'
HK	2	Gaspar Baldunciel		(substituted off) 58'
LP	1	Nicolás Solveyra		(substituted off) 40'
Replacements:
HK	16	Axel Zapata		(substituted on) 58'
PR	17	Santiago García Botta		(substituted on) 40'
PR	18	Marco Ciccioli		(substituted on) 58'
N8	19	Santiago Portillo		(substituted on) 21'
FL	20	Benito Ortíz de Rosas		(substituted on) 55'
SH	21	Gregorio del Prete		(substituted on) 59'
CE	22	Teo Castiglioni		(substituted on) 58'
FB	23	Facundo Cordero		(substituted on) 58'
Coach:
(Argentina) Ignacio Fernández Lobbe

FB	15	Will Magie
RW	14	Gannon Moore				(substituted off) 58'
OC	13	Bryce Campbell
IC	12	Paul Lasike	(red card) 30'
LW	11	Marcel Brache (c)
FH	10	AJ MacGinty
SH	9	Shaun Davies				(substituted off) 58'
N8	8	Cam Dolan
OF	7	Hanco Germishuys
BF	6	John Quill	(yellow card) 50' to 60'			(substituted off) 61'
RL	5	Nick Civetta
LL	4	Greg Peterson				(substituted off) 58'
TP	3	Dino Waldren				(substituted off) 64'
HK	2	Joe Taufeteʻe				(substituted off) 58'
LP	1	Titi Lamositele		(substituted off) 34'	(substituted on) 40'	(substituted off) 58'
Replacements:
HK	16	Dylan Fawsitt				(substituted on) 58'
PR	17	Chance Wenglewski		(substituted on) 34'	(substituted off) 40'	(substituted on) 58'
PR	18	Paul Mullen				(substituted on) 64'
LK	19	Nate Brakeley				(substituted on) 58'
FL	20	David Tameilau				(substituted on) 61'
SH	21	Ruben de Haas				(substituted on) 58'
FH	22	Tadhg Leader
FB	23	Dylan Audsley				(substituted on) 58'
Coach:
(South Africa) Gary Gold

Touch judges:
Esteban Filipanics (Argentina)
Juan Manuel Martínez (Argentina)
Television Match Official
Marcelo Pilara (Argentina)

9 February
20:15 (UTC-02:00)

Brazil	18–10	Canada
Pen: Josh Reeves (6/8) 11', 18', 42', 47', 68', 70'	WR Report; ARN Report	Try: Ciaran Hearn 8'; Con: Ciaran Hearn (1/1) 9'; Pen: Ciaran Hearn (1/3) 2'

Estádio Martins Pereira, São José dos Campos
Referee: Frank Méndez (Chile)

FB	15	Daniel Sancery
RW	14	Lucas Tranquez
OC	13	Felipe Sancery (c)
IC	12	Moisés Duque
LW	11	Robert Tenório	(substituted on) 79'
FH	10	Josh Reeves
SH	9	Lucas Duque
N8	8	André Arruda
OF	7	Arthur Bergo
BF	6	Cléber Dias
RL	5	Luiz Vieira
LL	4	Gabriel Paganini
TP	3	Jardel Vettorato	(substituted off) 74'
HK	2	Wilton Rebolo
LP	1	Lucas Abud
Replacements:
HK	16	Walter Schildberg
PR	17	Caíque Silva
PR	18	Pedro Bengaló	(substituted on) 74'
LK	19	Michael Moraes
N8	20	Alexandre Alves
SH	21	Douglas Rauth
WG	22	Lorenzo Massari	(substituted on) 79'
WG	23	Ariel Rodrigues
Coach:
(Argentina) Rodolfo Ambrosio

FB	15	Ciaran Hearn
RW	14	Andrew Coe
OC	13	Ben LeSage	(substituted off) 74'
IC	12	Nick Blevins	(substituted off) 72'
LW	11	Kainoa Lloyd
FH	10	Pat Parfrey
SH	9	Jamie Mackenzie	(substituted off) 66'
N8	8	Luke Campbell	(substituted off) 35'
OF	7	Lucas Rumball (c)
BF	6	Kyle Baillie
RL	5	Josh Larsen	(substituted off) 74'
LL	4	Conor Keys
TP	3	Matt Tierney	(substituted off) 61'
HK	2	Eric Howard	(substituted off) 79'
LP	1	Djustice Sears-Duru	(substituted off) 58'
Replacements:
PR	16	Noah Barker	(substituted on) 58'
PR	17	Ryan Kotlewski	(substituted on) 79'
PR	18	Cole Keith	(substituted on) 61'
LK	19	Justin Blanchet	(substituted on) 35'
CE	20	Giuseppe du Toit	(substituted on) 74'
FL	21	Nakai Penny	(substituted on) 74'
SH	22	Will Percillier	(substituted on) 66'
CE	23	Will Kelly	(substituted on) 72'
Coach:
Kingsley Jones

Touch judges:
Victor Hugo Barbosa (Brazil)
Braz Magaldi (Brazil)
Television Match Official
Diego Pazman (Argentina)

Notes:

- Theo Sauder was originally named in the starting team but pulled out due to injury during the warm up. Nick Blevins replaced him in the starting line-up and Giuseppe du Toit came onto the bench.

=== Week 3 ===
22 February
19:10 (UTC-08:00)

Canada	56–0	Chile
Try: Kyle Baillie 2'; Kainoa Lloyd 9', 17', 37'; Pat Parfrey 41'; Andrew Coe 53', 65'; Con: Ciaran Hearn (5/6) 3', 10', 18', 38', 42'; Gordon McRorie (1/1) 66'; Pen: Ciaran Hearn (1/1) 7'; Gordon McRorie (2/2) 75', 80'	WR Report; ARN Report

Westhills Stadium, Langford
Attendance: 1,000
Referee: Henrique Platais (Brazil)

FB	15	Theo Sauder	(substituted off) 52'
RW	14	Andrew Coe
OC	13	Nick Blevins
IC	12	Ciaran Hearn	(substituted off) 60'
LW	11	Kainoa Lloyd
FH	10	Pat Parfrey
SH	9	Jamie Mackenzie	(substituted off) 52'
N8	8	Dustin Dobravsky	(substituted off) 54'
OF	7	Lucas Rumball(c)
BF	6	Justin Blanchet
RL	5	Kyle Baillie	(substituted off) 43'
LL	4	Mike Sheppard
TP	3	Cole Keith	(substituted off) 78'
HK	2	Eric Howard	(substituted off) 54'
LP	1	Hubert Buydens	(substituted off) 54'
Replacements:
HK	16	Benoît Pifféro	(substituted on) 54'
PR	17	Noah Barker	(substituted on) 54'
PR	18	Ryan Kotlewski	(substituted on) 78'
LK	19	Conor Keys	(substituted on) 43'
FL	20	Nakai Penny	(substituted on) 54'
SH	21	Will Percillier	(substituted on) 52'
FH	22	Gordon McRorie	(substituted on) 52'
CE	23	Doug Fraser	(substituted on) 60'
Coach:
(Wales) Kingsley Jones

FB	15	Christian Huerta
RW	14	Julio Blanc
OC	13	José Ignacio Larenas
IC	12	Vicente Ayarza
LW	11	Gonzalo Lara
FH	10	Francisco González Moller	(substituted off) 54'
SH	9	Juan Pablo Larenas
N8	8	Martín Sigren (c)
OF	7	Thomas Orchard
BF	6	Eduardo Orpis	(substituted off) 58'
RL	5	Bastián Burguener	(substituted off) 43'
LL	4	Javier Eissmann	(substituted off) 58'
TP	3	Matías Dittus	(substituted off) 38'
HK	2	Augusto Böhme	(substituted off) 68'
LP	1	Marcelo Huerta	(substituted off) 38'
Replacements:
HK	16	Claudio Iturra	(substituted on) 38'
PR	17	Mauricio Gómez	(substituted on) 68'
PR	18	Maximiliano Hurtado	(substituted on) 58'
LK	19	Nicolás Ovalle	(substituted on) 38'
FL	20	Clemente Saavedra	(substituted on) 43'	(yellow card) 53' to 63'
SH	21	Jaden Laing	(substituted on) 58'
FH	22	Domingo Saavedra	(substituted on) 54'
FB	23	Tomás Ianiszewski	(substituted on) 48'
Coach:
(Uruguay) Pablo Lemoine

Touch judges:
Robin Kaluzniak (Canada)
Chris Assmus (Canada)
Television Match Official:
David Smortchevsky (Canada)

23 February

Argentina XV	35–10	Uruguay
Try: Francisco Gorrissen 2'; Lautaro Bavaro 16', 35'; Julián Domínguez 24'; Nicolás Sbrocco 77'; Con: Domingo Miotti (4/4) 3', 17, 25', 36'; Martín Elías (1/1) 78'	ARN Report; WR Report	Try: Tomás Inciarte 20'; Con: Tomás Inciarte (1/1) 21'; Pen: Tomás Inciarte (1/2) 30'

José Amalfitani Stadium, Buenos Aires
Referee: Derek Summers (United States)

FB	15	Martín Elías
RW	14	Matías Osadczuk
OC	13	Agustín Segura		(substituted off) 55'
IC	12	Lucas Mensa
LW	11	Julián Domínguez
FH	10	Domingo Miotti		(substituted off) 61'
SH	9	Felipe Ezcurra
N8	8	Benito Ortíz de Rosas		(substituted off) 61'
OF	7	Lautaro Bavaro (c)
BF	6	Francisco Gorrissen
RL	5	Franco Molina		(substituted off) 50'
LL	4	Carlos Repetto	(yellow card) 65' to 75'
TP	3	Lucas Favre		(substituted off) 40'
HK	2	Axel Zapata		(substituted off) 43'
LP	1	Nicolás Solveyra		(substituted off) 61'
Replacements:
HK	16	Diego Fortuny		(substituted on) 43'
PR	17	Javier Díaz		(substituted on) 61'
PR	18	Marco Ciccioli		(substituted on) 40'
LK	19	Jerónimo Ureta		(substituted on) 50'
N8	20	Nicolás Sbrocco		(substituted on) 61'
SH	21	Gregorio del Prete		(substituted on) 69'
CE	22	Tomás Cubilla		(substituted on) 55'
FB	23	Facundo Cordero		(substituted on) 61'
Coach:
(Argentina) Ignacio Fernández Lobbe

FB	15	Manuel Blengio
RW	14	Federico Favaro
OC	13	Joaquín Prada
IC	12	Agustín Della Corte
LW	11	Nicolás Freitas	(substituted off) 70'
FH	10	Juan Manuel Cat
SH	9	Tomás Inciarte	(substituted off) 69'
N8	8	Manuel Diana	(substituted off) 76'
OF	7	Leandro Segredo
BF	6	Juan Manuel Gaminara (c)
RL	5	Juan Manuel Rodríguez	(substituted off) 57'
LL	4	Santiago Piñeyrúa	(substituted off) 55'
TP	3	Mario Sagario	(substituted off) 44'
HK	2	Germán Kessler
LP	1	Facundo Gattas	(substituted off) 61'
Replacements:
HK	16	Guillermo Pujadas	(substituted on) 57'
PR	17	Joaquín Jaunsolo	(substituted on) 61'
PR	18	Juan Rombys	(substituted on) 44'
LK	19	Gonzalo Soto Mera
FL	20	Santiago Civetta	(substituted on) 55'
SH	21	Ignacio Rodríguez	(substituted on) 69'
FH	22	Ignacio García	(substituted on) 70'
CE	23	Mateo Mari	(substituted on) 76'
Coach:
(Argentina) Esteban Meneses

Touch judges:
Pali Deluca (Argentina)
Juan Pablo Federico (Argentina)
Television Match Official
Santiago Borsani (Argentina)

Notes:

- Joaquín Jaunsolo, Santiago Civetta, Santiago Piñeyrúa, Mateo Mari, and Ignacio Rodríguez (all Uruguay) made their international debuts.

23 February
19:10 (UTC−07:00)

United States	33–28	Brazil
Try: Paul Lasike 22'; Hanco Germishuys 27'; Mike Te'o 32'; John Quill 48'; Con: Will Magie (2/4) 23', 28'; Pen: Will Magie (3/3) 3', 17', 66'	WR Report; ARN Report; Rugbiers Report	Try: Lucas Duque 40'; Moisés Duque 59'; Matteo Dell’Acqua 72'; Con: Josh Reeves (2/3) 40', 73'; Pen: Josh Reeves (3/4) 20', 32', 45'

Dell Diamond, Round Rock
Referee: Damián Schneider (Argentina)

FB	15	Marcel Brache
RW	14	Blaine Scully (c)
OC	13	Bryce Campbell
IC	12	Paul Lasike
LW	11	Mike Te'o
FH	10	Will Magie		(substituted off) 67'
SH	9	Shaun Davies		(substituted off) 61'
N8	8	Cam Dolan
OF	7	Hanco Germishuys
BF	6	John Quill		(substituted off) 71'
RL	5	Nick Civetta
LL	4	Nate Brakeley		(substituted off) 61'
TP	3	Paul Mullen		(substituted off) 71'
HK	2	James Hilterbrand		(substituted off) 53'
LP	1	Chance Wenglewski		(substituted off) 71'
Replacements:
HK	16	Dylan Fawsitt	(substituted on) 53'	(substituted off) 79'
PR	17	David Ainu'u		(substituted on) 71'
PR	18	Dino Waldren		(substituted on) 71'
LK	19	Ben Landry		(substituted on) 61'	(yellow card) 70' to 80'
FL	20	David Tameilau		(substituted on) 71'
HK	21	Kapeli Pifeleti		(substituted on) 79'
SH	22	Ruben de Haas		(substituted on) 61'
FH	23	Will Hooley		(substituted on) 67'
Coach:
(South Africa) Gary Gold

FB	15	Daniel Sancery
RW	14	Lucas Tranquez
OC	13	Felipe Sancery (c)		(substituted off) 43'
IC	12	Moisés Duque
LW	11	Robert Tenório	(substituted off) 21'	(substituted on) 26'
FH	10	Josh Reeves
SH	9	Lucas Duque
N8	8	André Arruda
OF	7	Arthur Bergo
BF	6	Cléber Dias
RL	5	Luiz Vieira		(substituted off) 55'
LL	4	Matteo Dell’Acqua
TP	3	Jardel Vettorato		(substituted off) 55'
HK	2	Wilton Rebolo
LP	1	Lucas Abud	(yellow card) 16' to 26'
Replacements:
HK	16	Yan Rosetti		(substituted on) 55'
PR	17	Caíque Silva	(substituted on) 21'	(substituted off) 26'
PR	18	Pedro Bengaló
LK	19	Gabriel Paganini		(substituted on) 55'
FL	20	Alexandre Alves
SH	21	Douglas Rauth
CE	22	Lorenzo Massari		(substituted on) 43'
FB	23	Ariel Rodrigues
Coach:
(Argentina) Rodolfo Ambrosio

Touch judges:
Scott Green (United States)
Mike O'Brien (United States)

=== Week 4 ===
1 March

Canada	23–39	Argentina XV
Try: Kyle Baillie 50'; Andrew Coe 56'; Con: Gordon McRorie (2/2) 51', 57'; Pen: Ciaran Hearn (2/3) 11', 23'; Gordon McRorie (1/1) 65'	WR report ARN Report	Try: Tomás Cubilla 1', 39'; Matías Osadczuk 33'; Felipe Ezcurra 68'; Penalty try 79'; Con: Domingo Miotti (2/3) 34', 40'; Martín Roger 69'; Pen: Domingo Miotti (2/2) 17', 63'

Westhills Stadium, Langford
Referee: Derek Summers (United States)

FB	15	Theo Sauder
RW	14	Andrew Coe	(substituted off) 73'
OC	13	Nick Blevins
IC	12	Ciaran Hearn	(substituted off) 40'
LW	11	Kainoa Lloyd
FH	10	Gordon McRorie
SH	9	Jamie Mackenzie	(substituted off) 61'
N8	8	Dustin Dobravsky	(substituted off) 69'
OF	7	Lucas Rumball (c)
BF	6	Justin Blanchet
RL	5	Kyle Baillie
LL	4	Conor Keys	(substituted off) 61'
TP	3	Cole Keith	(substituted off) 69'
HK	2	Benoît Pifféro	(substituted off) 61'
LP	1	Hubert Buydens	(substituted off) 69'
Replacements:
HK	16	Jordan Olsen	(substituted on) 61'
PR	17	Noah Barker	(substituted on) 69'
PR	18	Ryan Kotlewski	(substituted on) 69'
LK	19	Josh Larsen	(substituted on) 61'
FL	20	Nakai Penny	(substituted on) 69'	(yellow card) 77' to 80'
SH	21	Will Percilier	(substituted on) 61'
FH	22	Pat Parfrey	(substituted on) 73'
CE	23	Doug Fraser	(substituted on) 40'
Coach:
(Wales) Kingsley Jones

FB	15	Facundo Cordero
RW	14	Matías Osadczuk
OC	13	Tomás Cubilla	(substituted off) 75'
IC	12	Lucas Mensa
LW	11	Julián Domínguez
FH	10	Domingo Miotti	(substituted off) 65'
SH	9	Felipe Ezcurra	(substituted off) 69'
N8	8	Santiago Portillo	(substituted off) 64'
OF	7	Lautaro Bavaro (c)
BF	6	Francisco Gorrissen
RL	5	Jerónimo Ureta
LL	4	Carlos Repetto	(substituted off) 64'
TP	3	Martín Fernández Segurotti	(substituted off) 69'
HK	2	Diego Fortuny	(substituted off) 77'
LP	1	Nicolás Solveyra	(substituted off) 69'
Replacements:
HK	16	José Luis González	(substituted on) 77'
PR	17	Javier Corvalán	(substituted on) 69'
PR	18	Joaquín Lerche	(substituted on) 69'
LK	19	Lucas Santa Cruz	(substituted on) 64'
N8	20	Nicolás Sbrocco	(substituted on) 64'
SH	21	Gregorio del Prete	(substituted on) 69'
FH	22	Martín Roger	(substituted on) 65'
CE	23	Teo Castiglioni	(substituted on) 75'
Coach:
(Argentina) Ignacio Fernández Lobbe

Touch judges:
Chris Assmus (Canada)
Harry Mason (Canada)
Television Match Official
Andrew Hosier (Canada)

2 March
19:10 (UTC−8:00)

United States	25–32	Uruguay
Try: Joe Taufeteʻe (3) 10', 15', 47'; Blaine Scully 74'; Con: Will Magie (1/2) 75'; Pen: Will Hooley (1/1) 34'	WR report ARN Report	Try: Mateo Sanguinetti 5'; Federico Favaro (2) 30', 43'; Juan Manuel Cat 38'; Nicolás Freitas 67'; Con: Federico Favaro (1/2) 6'; Andrés Vilaseca (1/3) 39'; Pen: Andrés Vilaseca (1/1) 80+1'

Starfire Sports, Tukwila
Referee: Pali Deluca (Argentina)

FB	15	Will Hooley	(substituted off) 65'
RW	14	Blaine Scully (c)
OC	13	Bryce Campbell
IC	12	Paul Lasike
LW	11	Marcel Brache
FH	10	Will Magie
SH	9	Ruben de Haas
N8	8	Cam Dolan
OF	7	Hanco Germishuys
BF	6	David Tameilau	(substituted off) 58'
RL	5	Nick Civetta
LL	4	Nate Brakeley	(substituted off) 60'
TP	3	Paul Mullen	(substituted off) 75'
HK	2	Joe Taufeteʻe
LP	1	David Ainu'u	(substituted off) 75'
Replacements:
HK	16	Kapeli Pifeleti
PR	17	Olive Kilifi	(substituted on) 75'
PR	18	Dino Waldren	(substituted on) 75'
LK	19	Ben Landry	(substituted on) 60'
FL	20	John Quill	(substituted on) 58'
SH	21	Nick Boyer
FB	22	Dylan Audsley	(substituted on) 65'
WG	23	Gannon Moore
Coach:
(South Africa) Gary Gold

FB	15	Gastón Mieres
RW	14	Federico Favaro
OC	13	Joaquín Prada
IC	12	Andrés Vilaseca
LW	11	Nicolás Freitas
FH	10	Juan Manuel Cat
SH	9	Santiago Arata		(substituted off) 75'
N8	8	Alejandro Nieto
OF	7	Juan Diego Ormaechea		(substituted off) 61'
BF	6	Juan Manuel Gaminara (c)	(yellow card) 71' to 80'
RL	5	Diego Magno		(substituted off) 65'
LL	4	Ignacio Dotti
TP	3	Juan Rombys		(substituted off) 56'
HK	2	Germán Kessler		(substituted off) 65'
LP	1	Mateo Sanguinetti		(substituted off) 65'
Replacements:
HK	16	Facundo Gattas		(substituted on) 65'
PR	17	Juan Echeverría		(substituted on) 65'
PR	18	Mario Sagario		(substituted on) 56'
FL	19	Franco Lamanna		(substituted on) 61'
FL	20	Leonardo Segredo		(substituted on) 65'
SH	21	Tomás Inciarte		(substituted on) 75'
FB	22	Manuel Blengio
CE	23	Agustín Della Corte
Coach:
(Argentina) Esteban Meneses

Touch judges:
Phil Akroyd (United States)
Josh Houston (United States)
Television Match Official
Davey Ardey (United States)

Notes:

- The United States' Joe Taufeteʻe scored three tries to take sole possession of the record for most career Test tries by a player in the tight five. After this match, Taufeteʻe had 18 career Test tries.

2 March

Brazil	15–10	Chile
Pen: Josh Reeves (5/7) 7', 12', 36', 68', 76'	WR report ARN Report	Try: Francisco Garrido 43'; Con: Francisco González Moller (1/1) 44'; Pen: Francisco González Moller (1/1) 15'

Estádio Jayme Cintra, Jundiaí
Referee: Joaquín Montes (Uruguay)

FB	15	Daniel Sancery
RW	14	Lucas Tranquez
OC	13	Lorenzo Massari	(substituted off) 79'
IC	12	Moisés Duque
LW	11	Robert Tenório
FH	10	Josh Reeves
SH	9	Lucas Duque
N8	8	André Arruda
OF	7	Arthur Bergo (c)
BF	6	Cléber Dias
RL	5	Luiz Vieira
LL	4	Matteo Del’Acqua
TP	3	Jardel Vettorato
HK	2	Wilton Rebolo	(substituted off) 59'
LP	1	Caíque Silva	(substituted off) 79'
Replacements:
HK	16	Yan Rosetti	(substituted on) 59'
PR	17	João Talamini	(substituted on) 79'
PR	18	Pedro Bengaló
FL	19	Michael Moraes
N8	20	Alexandre Alves
SH	21	Douglas Rauth
WG	22	Stefano Giantorno
WG	23	Ariel Rodrigues	(substituted on) 79'
Coach:
(Argentina) Rodolfo Ambrosio

FB	15
RW	14	Tomás Ianiszewski	(substituted off) 21'
OC	13	José Ignacio Larenas
IC	12	Vicente Ayarza
LW	11	Gonzalo Lara
FH	10	Francisco González Moller
SH	9	Domingo Saavedra
N8	8	Martín Sigren (c)
OF	7	Thomas Orchard	(substituted off) 73'
BF	6	Eduardo Orpis	(substituted off) 69'
RL	5	Francisco Garrido	(substituted off) 64'
LL	4	Javier Eissmann
TP	3	Nicolás Ovalle	(substituted off) 69'
HK	2	Claudio Iturra	(substituted off) 37'
LP	1	Vittorio Lastra	(substituted off) 64'
Replacements:
HK	16	Augusto Böhme	(substituted on) 37'
PR	17	Santiago Garrido	(substituted on) 64'
HK	18	Claudio Zamorano	(substituted on) 69'
PR	19	Mauricio Gómez	(substituted on) 69'
LK	20	Augusto Sarmiento	(substituted on) 64'
N8	21	Camilo Sánchez	(substituted on) 73'
SH	22	Juan Pablo Perrotta	(substituted on) 21'
SH	23	Juan Pablo Larenas
Coach:

Touch judges:
Victor Hugo Barbosa (Brazil)
Renato Scalercio (Brazil)
Television Match Official
Diego Pasman (Argentina)

=== Week 5 ===
8 March

United States	30–25	Canada
Try: Joe Taufeteʻe 19', 45'; Cam Dolan 38'; Ruben de Haas 79'; Con: Will Magie (1/3) 39'; Tadhg Leader (1/1) 80'; Pen: Will Magie (2/3) 6', 58'	WR report ARN Report	Try: Nick Blevins 13'; Luke Campbell 32', 51'; Con: Gordon McRorie (2/3) 14', 52'; Pen: Gordon McRorie (2/2) 62', 73'

Starfire Sports, Tukwila
Referee: Pali Deluca (Argentina)

FB	15	Marcel Brache
RW	14	Blaine Scully (c)
OC	13	Bryce Campbell
IC	12	Paul Lasike
LW	11	Mike Te'o
FH	10	Will Magie	(substituted off) 77'
SH	9	Shaun Davies	(substituted off) 59'
N8	8	Cam Dolan	(substituted off) 59'
OF	7	Hanco Germishuys
BF	6	John Quill
RL	5	Nick Civetta	(substituted off) 63'
LL	4	Ben Landry
TP	3	Paul Mullen	(substituted off) 77'
HK	2	Joe Taufeteʻe	(substituted off) 73'
LP	1	David Ainu'u	(substituted off) 63'
Replacements:
HK	16	Kapeli Pifeleti	(substituted on) 73'
PR	17	Olive Kilifi	(substituted on) 63'
PR	18	Dino Waldren	(substituted on) 77'
LK	19	Greg Peterson	(substituted on) 63'
N8	20	Malon Al-Jiboori	(substituted on) 59'
SH	21	Ruben de Haas	(substituted on) 59'
FH	22	Tadhg Leader	(substituted on) 77'
WG	23	Gannon Moore
Coach:
(South Africa) Gary Gold

FB	15	Theo Sauder
RW	14	Andrew Coe
OC	13	Ben LeSage
IC	12	Nick Blevins
LW	11	Kainoa Lloyd
FH	10	Gordon McRorie
SH	9	Phil Mack		(substituted off) 63'
N8	8	Luke Campbell	53' to 57'
OF	7	Lucas Rumball (c)
BF	6	Justin Blanchet		(substituted off) 44'
RL	5	Kyle Baillie	(yellow card) 76' to 80'
LL	4	Conor Keys
TP	3	Cole Keith
HK	2	Benoît Pifféro
LP	1	Hubert Buydens
Replacements:
HK	16	Jordan Olsen
PR	17	Noah Barker
PR	18	Ryan Kotlewski
LK	19	Josh Larsen	(substituted on) 53'	(substituted off) 57'
N8	20	Dustin Dobravsky		(substituted on) 44'
SH	21	Jamie Mackenzie		(substituted on) 63'
FH	22	Pat Parfrey
CE	23	Doug Fraser
Coach:
(Wales) Kingsley Jones

Touch judges:
Scott Green (United States)
Denny Russell (United States)
Television Match Official
Davey Ardrey (United States)

9 March

Chile	10–85	Argentina XV
Try: Mauricio Gómez 58'; Con: Santiago Videla (1/1) 59'; Pen: Santiago Videla (1/1) 28'	ARN Report	Try: Diego Fortuny 8', 29'; Lucas Santa Cruz 12'; Julián Domínguez 23'; Lucas Mensa 37', 45', 47'; Santiago Carreras 40'; Agustín Segura 51'; Domingo Miotti 67', 69'; Gregorio del Prete 72', 79'; Con: Martín Elías (8/9) 9', 13', 24', 38', 40', 46', 48', 52'; Domingo Miotti (2/4) 71', 73'

Santiago
Referee: Henrique Platais (Brazil)

FB	15	Christian Huerta
RW	14	Beltrán Vergara
OC	13	José Ignacio Larenas		(substituted off) 25'
IC	12	Vicente Ayarza
LW	11	Gonzalo Lara		(substituted off) 75'
FH	10	Santiago Videla
SH	9	Domingo Saavedra
N8	8	Martín Sigren (c)
OF	7	Thomas Orchard
BF	6	Eduardo Orpis		(substituted off) 40'
RL	5	Javier Eissmann
LL	4	Francisco Garrido		(substituted off) 46'
TP	3	Matías Dittus		(substituted off) 40'
HK	2	Augusto Böhme		(substituted off) 61'
LP	1	Santiago Garrido	(substituted off) 46'	(substituted on) 64'
Replacements:
HK	16	Claudio Zamorano	(substituted on) 52'	(substituted off) 64'
PR	17	Nicolás Ovalle		(substituted on) 40'
PR	18	Mauricio Gómez		(substituted on) 46'
LK	19	Augusto Sarmiento		(substituted on) 46'
N8	20	Jaden Laing		(substituted on) 61'
FL	21	Javier Richard	(substituted on) 40'	(substituted off) 52'
SH	22	Juan Pablo Perrotta		(substituted on) 75'
CE	23	Luca Strabucchi		(substituted on) 25'
Coach:
(Uruguay) Pablo Lemoine

FB	15	Santiago Carreras
RW	14	Matías Osadczuk
OC	13	Agustín Segura	(substituted off) 52'
IC	12	Lucas Mensa
LW	11	Julián Domínguez
FH	10	Martín Elías	(substituted off) 52'
SH	9	Felipe Ezcurra	(substituted off) 52'
N8	8	Benito Ortíz de Rosas
OF	7	Lautaro Bavaro (c)	(substituted off) 52'
BF	6	Francisco Gorrissen	(substituted off) 52'
RL	5	Lucas Santa Cruz
LL	4	Carlos Repetto
TP	3	Martín Fernández Segurotti	(substituted off) 40'
HK	2	Diego Fortuny	(substituted off) 52'
LP	1	Nicolás Solveyra	(substituted off) 52'
Replacements:
HK	16	José Luis González	(substituted on) 52'
PR	17	Javier Corvalán	(substituted on) 52'
PR	18	Lucas Favre	(substituted off) 40'
N8	19	Santiago Portillo	(substituted on) 52'
N8	20	Nicolás Sbrocco	(substituted on) 52'
SH	21	Gregorio del Prete	(substituted on) 52'
FH	22	Domingo Miotti	(substituted on) 52'
CE	23	Tomás Cubilla	(substituted on) 52'
Coach:
(Argentina) Ignacio Fernández Lobbe

Touch judges:
Frank Méndez (Chile)
Juan Ignacio Calle (Chile)
Television Match Official
Gabriel Pinter (Chile)

9 March

Uruguay	42–20	Brazil

Estadio Charrúa, Montevideo

== Statistics ==
=== Most points ===
Pos	Name	Team	Pts
1	Josh Reeves	Brazil	54
2	Martin Elias	Argentina XV	38
3	Ciaran Hearn	Canada	34
4	Joe Taufeteʻe	United States	30
4	Domingo Miotti	Argentina XV	30
6	Will Magie	United States	27
7	Lucas Mensa	Argentina XV	25
7	AJ MacGinty	United States	25
7	Gordon McRorie	Canada	25
10	Federico Favaro	Uruguay	22

=== Most tries ===
Pos	Name	Team	Tries
1	Joe Taufeteʻe	United States	6
2	Lucas Mensa	Argentina XV	5
3	Lautaro Bavaro	Argentina XV	4
3	Julián Domínguez	Argentina XV	4
5	AJ MacGinty	United States	3
5	Kainoa Lloyd	Canada	3
5	Felipe Ezcurra	Argentina XV	3
5	Andrew Coe	Canada	3
5	Federico Favaro	Uruguay	3
5	Santiago Carreras	Argentina XV	3

Updated after Week 5.

== Squads ==
Argentina XV squad
Forwards
Backs
Coach

Brazil squad
Forwards
Backs
Coach

Canada squad
Forwards
Backs
Coach

Chile squad
Forwards
Backs
Coach

United States squad
Forwards	Ainu'u • Brakeley • Campbell • Civetta • Dolan • Fawsitt • Germishuys • Hilterbrand • Kilifi • Lamositele • Landry • Mullen • Peterson • Pifeleti • Quill • Scully • Tameilau • Taufeteʻe • Waldren
Backs	Audsley • Boyer • Brache • Davies • de Haas • Hooley • Lasike • Leader • MacGinty • Magie • Moore • Te'o
Coach	Gold

Uruguay squad
Forwards
Backs
Coach
