= List of 2023–24 Major League Rugby transfers =

This is a list of player transfers involving Major League Rugby teams that occurred from the end of the 2023 season and through the 2024 season. This season marks the debut of Miami Sharks. Rugby ATL have announced they will move to Los Angeles for the 2024 season, with a new name yet to be confirmed.

== Chicago Hounds ==
Players in

- (United States) Juan Pen from (United States) St Bonaventure University
- (Ireland) Nick McCarthy from (Ireland) Leinster
- (United States) Noah Brown from (United States) Indiana University
- (United States) Clayton Means from (United States) Lindenwood University
- (United States) Daelan Denenberg from (United States) Santa Clara University
- (United States) Ben Landry from (United States) Seattle Seawolves
- (Georgia (country)) Zurabi Zhvania from (France) Grenoble
- (Ireland) Dave Kearney from (Ireland) Leinster
- (South Africa) Janus Venter from (South Africa) Cheetahs

Players out

- (England) Cam Dodson to (France) Aurillac

== Dallas Jackals ==
Players in

- (United States) Evan Conlon from (United States) Los Angeles
- (Wales) Ben Fry from (Wales) Dragons
- (United States) Marques Fuala'au from (United States) Central Washington University
- (United States) Ronnie McElligott from (United States) Saint Mary's College
- (United States) Daemon Torres from (United States) Los Angeles
- (United States) Noah Wright from (United States) Central Washington University
- (United States) Joeli Tikoisuva from (United States) San Diego Legion
- (United States) Connor Olvera from (United States) Brigham Young University
- (South Africa) Marcell Muller from (South Africa) Cheetahs
- (Argentina) Manuel Covella from (Argentina) Rosario
- (South Africa) Ani Mteto from (United States) New Orleans Gold

Players out

- (United States) Alex Tucci to (United States) Miami Sharks
- (Argentina) Conrado Roura to (Italy) Rangers Vicenza Rugby
- (United States) Danny Christensen to (United States) San Diego Legion
- (Argentina) Alejandro Torres to (Italy) Torino
- (United States) Nick Naposki to (United States) Miami Sharks
- (American Samoa) James Vaifale to (United States) San Diego Legion

== Old Glory DC ==
Players in

- (Scotland) Rob Harley from (France) Colomiers
- (Uruguay) Ignacio Dotti from (Uruguay) Peñarol
- (New Zealand) Jason Robertson from (France) Bayonne
- (Scotland) Damien Hoyland from (Scotland) Edinburgh
- (Argentina) Axel Müller from (France) Brive
- (England) Perry Humphreys from (England) Worcester Warriors
- (United States) Tommaso Boni from (Italy) Zebre Parma
- (Ivory Coast) Kevin Brou from (France) Albi

Players out

- (Canada) Doug Fraser retired
- (New Zealand) Nic Souchon to (United States) Utah Warriors
- (Canada) Kyle Baillie to (United States) New England Free Jacks

== Houston SaberCats ==
Players in

- (Samoa) AJ Alatimu from (United States) Seattle Seawolves
- (South Africa) Justin Basson from (United States) Los Angeles
- (South Africa) Johan Momsen from (United States) Los Angeles
- (United States) Orrin Bizer from (United States) Life University
- (United States) Anton Viera from (United States) Santa Clara University
- (United States) Max Schumacher from (United States) UC Berkeley
- (United States) Ronan Murphy from (United States) American Raptors
- (United States) Line Latu from (United States) American Raptors
- (Samoa) Ezekiel Lindenmuth from (New Zealand) Moana Pasifika

Players out

- (United States) Joe Taufete'e to (United States) Seattle Seawolves
- (United States) Danny Barrett retired
- (South Africa) Dillon Smit retired
- (Canada) Robbie Povey to (Canada) Toronto Arrows
- (South Africa) Jaco Bezuidenhout to (United States) New England Free Jacks
- (South Africa) Dean Muir released

== Los Angeles ==
Players in

- (South Africa) Jurie van Vuuren from (United States) Utah Warriors
- (South Africa) Jordan Chait from (United States) Seattle Seawolves
- (United States) Jackson Zabierek from (United States) UC Santa Cruz
- (Australia) Nathan Beil from (United States) UCLA
- (United States) Nick Hartley from (United States) Missouri S&T
- (United States) Matt Anticev from (United States) Dartmouth
- (Australia) Oli Griffiths from (United States) UCLA
- (New Zealand) Jason Emery from (United States) Rugby New York
- (New Zealand) Dan Hollinshead from (United States) Rugby New York
- (New Zealand) Bruce Kauika-Petersen from (New Zealand) Northland
- (New Zealand) Rory van Vugt from (New Zealand) Southland

Players out

- (United States) Ryan Rees to (United States) Seattle Seawolves
- (United States) Evan Conlon to (United States) Dallas Jackals
- (Australia) Jordan Brown to (Canada) Toronto Arrows
- (South Africa) Justin Basson to (United States) Houston SaberCats
- (South Africa) Johan Momsen to (United States) Houston SaberCats
- (United States) Vili Helu to (United States) San Diego Legion
- (United States) Chase Schor-Haskin to (United States) Miami Sharks
- (United States) Daemon Torres to (United States) Dallas Jackals
- (South Africa) Kurt Coleman retired
- (Germany) Chris Hilsenbeck to (France) Biarritz
- (New Zealand) Te Rangatira Waitokia to (Canada) Toronto Arrows
- (New Zealand) Rewita Biddle to (Canada) Toronto Arrows
- (South Africa) John-Roy Jenkinson to (United States) New England Free Jacks

== Miami Sharks ==
Players in

- (Wales) Rob Evans from (Wales) Dragons
- (Wales) Kirby Myhill from (Wales) Cardiff
- (United States) Alex Tucci from (United States) Dallas Jackals
- (United States) Setu Vole from (United States) Lindenwood University
- (United States) Charlie Overton from (United States) Life University
- (United States) Rick Rose from (United States) St. Bonaventure University
- (Uruguay) Manuel Ardao from (Uruguay) Peñarol
- (United States) Chase Schor-Haskin from (United States) Los Angeles
- (South Africa) Roelof Smit from (South Africa) Cheetahs
- (Argentina) Tomás Casares from (United States) New England Free Jacks
- (Argentina) Tomás Cubelli from (France) Biarritz
- (Canada) Shane O'Leary from (Canada) Toronto Arrows
- (Uruguay) Felipe Etcheverry from (Uruguay) Peñarol
- (Uruguay) Tomás Inciarte from (Uruguay) Peñarol
- (England) Connor Burns from (United States) Utah Warriors
- (United States) Eric Naposki from (United States) Dallas Jackals
- (Scotland) Nick Grigg from (New Zealand) Hawke's Bay
- (New Zealand) Dan Pryor from (United States) San Diego Legion

Players out

== New England Free Jacks ==
Players in

- (United States) Will Chevalier from (United States) Indiana University
- (Canada) Gabe Casey from (Canada) University of Victoria
- (Samoa) Junior Gafa from (United States) Brown University
- (Canada) Kyle Baillie from (United States) Old Glory DC
- (South Africa) Jaco Bezuidenhout from (United States) Houston SaberCats
- (South Africa) John-Roy Jenkinson from (United States) Rugby ATL
- (United States) Killian Coghlan from (Ireland) University College Cork

Players out

- (New Zealand) Jesse Parete to (New Zealand) Taranaki
- (Uruguay) Tomás Casares to (United States) Miami Sharks
- (New Zealand) Beaudein Waaka to (Japan) Skyactivs Hiroshima

== New Orleans Gold ==
Players in

- (United States) Javon Camp signed
- (United States) Sam Buckley from (United States) Utah Warriors
- (United States) Gabe Mahu'inga from (United States) Brigham Young University
- (Ireland) Cian Darling from (United States) Lindenwood University
- (United States) Julian Roberts from (United States) Life University
- (New Zealand) Isaac Salmon from (New Zealand) Hawke's Bay

Players out

- (Canada) Eric Howard retired
- (United States) Dino Waldren retired
- (United States) Billy Stewart released
- (United States) Devin Short to (United States) Seattle Seawolves
- (South Africa) Ani Mteto to (United States) Dallas Jackals

== Rugby New York ==
Players in

- (Albania) Gjergji Bacuku from (United States) Hofstra University
- (New Zealand) Albert O'Shannessey from (United States) Central Washington University
- (United States) Nick Lapponese from (United States) Fairfield University

Players out

- (New Zealand) Brendon O'Connor retired
- (United States) Eamon Matthews retired
- (Australia) Nick Feakes retired

== San Diego Legion ==
Players in

- (United States) Joe Hawthorne from (United States) St. Bonaventure University
- (England) James Rivers from (United States) University of Arizona
- (United States) Vili Helu from (United States) Los Angeles
- (United States) Michael Ramos from (United States) University of San Diego
- (United States) Danny Christensen from (United States) Dallas Jackals
- (United States) Tyren Al-Jiboori from (United States) Lindenwood University
- (American Samoa) James Vaifale from (United States) Dallas Jackals
- (United States) Ryan James from (United States) American Raptors
- (New Zealand) Lincoln McClutchie from (New Zealand) Hawke's Bay

Players out

- (United States) Will Hooley retired
- (United States) Ryan Matyas retired
- (United States) Joeli Tikoisuva to (United States) Dallas Jackals
- (Australia) Ben Grant to (New Zealand) Hurricanes
- (New Zealand) Dan Pryor to (United States) Miami Sharks

== Seattle Seawolves ==
Players in

- (United States) Joe Taufete'e from (United States) Houston Sabercats
- (Niue) Toni Pulu from (Australia) Western Force
- (Australia) Mack Mason from (United States) Austin Gilgronis
- (United States) Ryan Rees from (United States) Los Angeles
- (Canada) Scott Bowers from (Canada) Trinity Western University
- (United States) Devin Short from (United States) New Orleans Gold
- (Ireland) Neal Moylett from (United States) Lindenwood University
- (Namibia) Divan Rossouw from (Russia) Krasny Yar
- (New Zealand) Mahonri Ngakuru from (New Zealand) Moana Pasifika

Players out

- (Samoa) AJ Alatimu to (United States) Houston Sabercats
- (South Africa) Jordan Chait to (United States) Los Angeles
- (United States) Ben Landry to (United States) Chicago Hounds
- (United States) Karl Keane to (Japan) Urayasu D-Rocks
- (United States) Martin Iosefo to (United States) USA Sevens
- (United States) Cole Zarcone retired

== Toronto Arrows ==
Players in

- (Australia) Jordan Brown from (United States) Los Angeles
- (France) Louis Millet from (Canada) Bishop's University
- (England) Monty Weatherall from (Canada) McGill University
- (Canada) Robbie Povey from (United States) Houston SaberCats
- (New Zealand) Te Rangatira Waitokia from (United States) Los Angeles
- (New Zealand) Rewita Biddle from (United States) Los Angeles

Players out

- (Canada) Mike Sheppard retired
- (Canada) Shane O'Leary to (United States) Miami Sharks

== Utah Warriors ==
Players in

- (Canada) Josh Halladay from (Canada) Trinity Western University
- (United States) Abe Turpen from (United States) University of Arizona
- (United States) Michael Biagi from (United States) Brigham Young University
- (United States) Isaia Kruse from (United States) Fresno State
- (New Zealand) Nic Souchon from (United States) Old Glory DC
- (Australia) Phil Bradford from (Australia) Hunter Wildfires
- (New Zealand) Frank Lochore from (New Zealand) Hawke's Bay

Players out

- (United States) Sam Buckley to (United States) New Orleans Gold
- (South Africa) Jurie van Vuuren to (United States) Los Angeles
- (New Zealand) Henry Bell to (New Zealand) Highlanders
- (United States) Joey Backe released
- (United States) Calvin Whiting retired
- (England) Connor Burns to (United States) Miami Sharks
- (United States) Lance Williams released

== See also ==
- List of 2022–23 Major League Rugby transfers
- List of 2023–24 Premiership Rugby transfers
- List of 2023–24 RFU Championship transfers
- List of 2023–24 Super Rugby transfers
- List of 2023–24 United Rugby Championship transfers
- List of 2023–24 Top 14 transfers
- List of 2023–24 Rugby Pro D2 transfers
