= Cam Dolan =

American rugby union player (born 1990)

Cameron Alexander Dolan
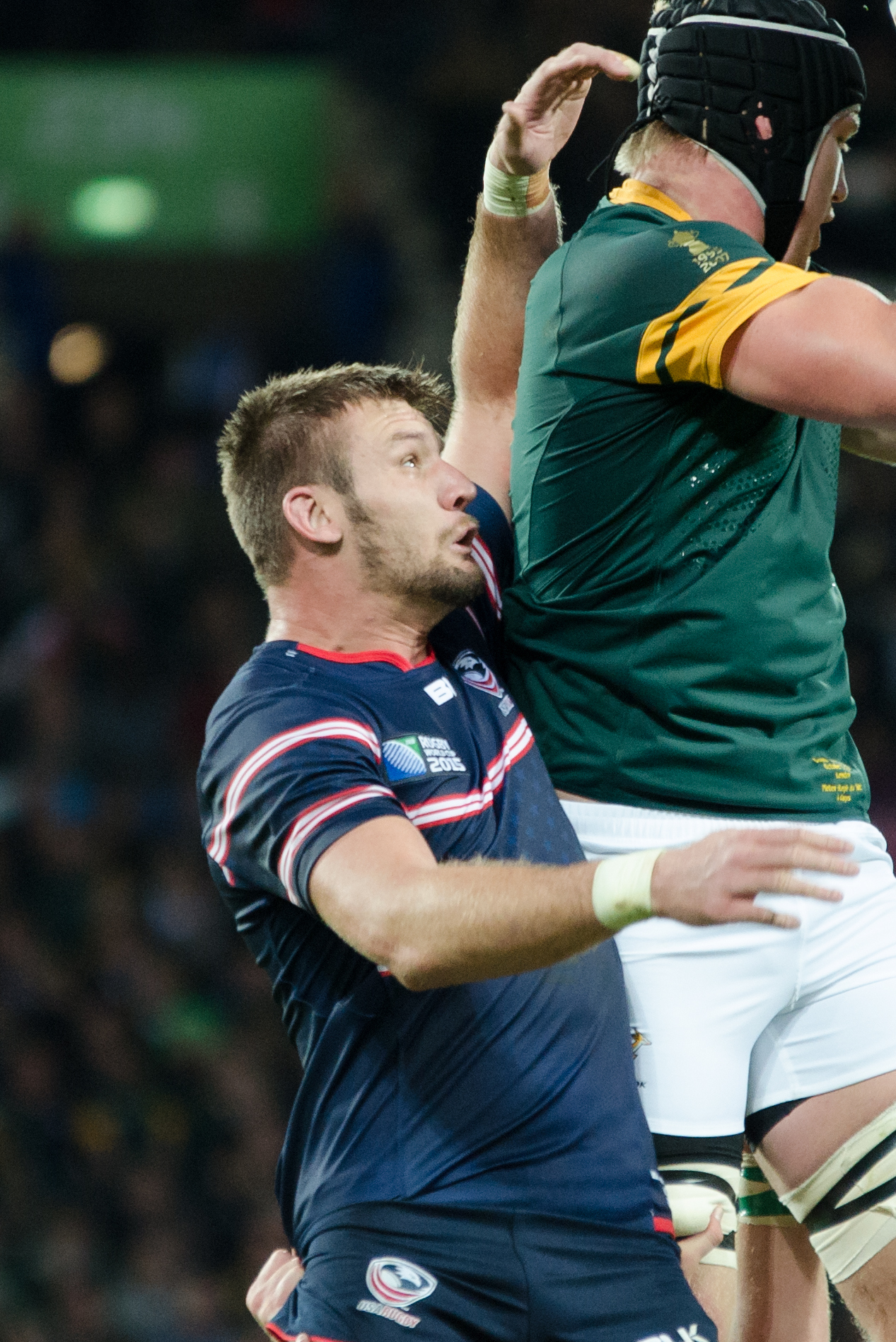
- Born: Cameron Alexander Dolan; March 7, 1990 (age 36) Fort Myers, Florida, United States
- Height: 198 cm (6 ft 6 in)
- Weight: 115 kg (254 lb; 18 st 2 lb)
- University: Life University

Rugby union career
- Position(s): Number 8, Flanker, Lock
Amateur team(s)
Years	Team	Apps	(Points)
2009–2013	Life University		
Senior career
Years	Team	Apps	(Points)
2013–2015	Northampton Saints	1	(0)
2015–2017	Cardiff Blues	20	(20)
2018	San Diego Legion	6	(0)
2018	Nottingham	4	(5)
2019–2025	New Orleans Gold	78	(75)
- Correct as of 22 June 2025
International career
Years	Team	Apps	(Points)
2009	United States U20	4	(5)
2013–2023	United States	67	(105)
- Correct as of 22 June 2025

Cameron Dolan (born March 7, 1990) is an American former rugby union player who normally played at the Number 8 position. He played most of his professional career for the NOLA Gold of the Major League Rugby (MLR). Dolan previously played professional rugby outside the United States with the Cardiff Blues, Nottingham R.F.C., and Northampton Saints.

== Early career ==
Dolan began playing rugby in high school with the Naples Bears in Florida, although he did spend a very successful term in the 1st XV at St Edward’s school in Cheltenham before playing college rugby at Life University in Atlanta, Georgia. Dolan played with Life University at the Collegiate Rugby Championship, and was named to the CRC All-Tournament team in 2012 and 2013. At Life University, Dolan was a four-time First Team All-American, and won a National Championship in 2013.

== Club career ==
Dolan's performance against the Maori in November 2013 was seen by Jim Mallinder, Head Coach of Northampton Saints, who offered Dolan a professional contract with the Saints. Dolan was brought in as an injury replacement for James Craig. Dolan joined fellow U.S. international Samu Manoa at the club. Dolan did not make any first team appearances for Northampton during the 2013–14 season. However, he made several appearances for the Saints' sevens team and second side, Wanderers. His strong performances in training earned him a one-year extension with Saints for the 2014–15 Premiership season. Dolan made his professional debut for Northampton Saints on January 31, 2015 in the Anglo Welsh Cup.

Following two seasons with Saints, Dolan joined Cardiff Blues for the 2015-16 Pro 12 season.

== International career ==
Dolan first appeared on the International scene during 2009, where he was named captain of the United States U20's team for the 2009 IRB Junior World Rugby Trophy. At this time he was the United States Rugby Foundation Development Grant Recipient, which is a foundation to develop and improve upcoming rugby talent in the United States.

His efforts for the Under 20s side and his club side landed Dolan in the United States senior side for the 2013 IRB Pacific Nations Cup, the inaugural year for the United States in the competition. He made his full International debut at No.8 against Fiji, as a replacement for captain Todd Clever who was unable to play this match due to injury. His third and fourth cap, came when the USA faced Canada in Round 3 of the 2015 Rugby World Cup Americas qualifications, which ended in a 2–0 defeat thus parachuting USA down to the NACRA-CONSUR playoff final.

In October 2013, Dolan was named captain for the USA Select XV side in the 2013 Americas Rugby Championship. He led the side to two victories; against Canada A and Uruguay. Following this Championship, Dolan was named in the American squad for their 2013 end-of-year rugby union tests. He was named Man of the Match in their opening game against the Māori All Blacks, picking up a try at the 71st minute.

At the conclusion of 2013, Dolan was named the U.S. Breakout Player of the Year by Rugby Mag.

Dolan was the starting No. 8 for the USA when they achieved their first-ever win over a Tier 1 nation, Scotland in 2018. Dolan became the USA Eagle with the most victories at 30 wins in 59 appearances, following the USA's victory over Chile in 2023 World Cup qualifying.

=== International tries ===
As of 7 August 2023

Try	Opposing team	Location	Venue	Competition	Date	Result	Score
1	Russia	London, England	Allianz Park	2013 end-of-year rugby union internationals	23 November 2013	Win	7 – 28
2	Japan	Carson, United States	StubHub Center	2014 IRB Pacific Nations Cup	14 June 2014	Loss	29 – 37
3	Canada	Ottawa, Canada	Twin Elm Rugby Park	2015 Rugby World Cup warm-up matches	22 August 2015	Win	23 – 41
4	Brazil	Round Rock, United States	Dell Diamond	2017 Americas Rugby Championship	11 February 2017	Win	51 – 3
5	Chile	Santiago, Chile	Pista Atlética San Carlos de Apoquindo	2017 Americas Rugby Championship	25 February 2017	Win	9 – 57
6	Canada	San Diego, United States	Torero Stadium	2019 Rugby World Cup – Americas qualification	1 July 2017	Win	52 – 16
7	Canada	San Diego, United States	Torero Stadium	2019 Rugby World Cup – Americas qualification	1 July 2017	Win	52 – 16
8	Russia	Denver, United States	Dick's Sporting Goods Park	2018 June rugby union tests	9 June 2018	Win	62 – 13
9	Canada	Halifax, Canada	Wanderers Grounds	2018 June rugby union tests	23 June 2018	Win	17 – 42
10	Canada	Halifax, Canada	Wanderers Grounds	2018 June rugby union tests	23 June 2018	Win	17 – 42
11	Canada	Halifax, Canada	Wanderers Grounds	2018 June rugby union tests	23 June 2018	Win	17 – 42
12	Samoa	San Sebastián, Spain	Anoeta Stadium	2018 end-of-year rugby union internationals	10 November 2018	Win	30 – 29
13	Samoa	San Sebastián, Spain	Anoeta Stadium	2018 end-of-year rugby union internationals	10 November 2018	Win	30 – 29
14	Chile	Maipú, Chile	Estadio Santiago Bueras	2019 Americas Rugby Championship	2 February 2019	Win	8 – 71
15	Canada	Tukwila, United States	Starfire Sports	2019 Americas Rugby Championship	8 March 2019	Win	30 – 25
16	Canada	Vancouver, Canada	BC Place	2019 Rugby World Cup warm-up matches	7 September 2019	Win	15 – 20
17	England	London, England	Twickenham Stadium	2021 July rugby union tests	4 July 2021	Loss	43 – 29
18	Uruguay	Glendale, United States	Infinity Park	2023 Rugby World Cup – Americas qualification	2 October 2021	Win	19 – 16
19	Hong Kong	Dubai	The Sevens Stadium	2023 RWC Final Qualification Tournament	12 November 2022	Win	49 – 7
20	Romania	Bucharest, Romania	Stadionul Arcul de Triumf	2023 Rugby World Cup warm-up matches	5 August 2023	Win	31 – 17
21	Portugal	Algarve, Portugal	Estádio Algarve	2023 Rugby World Cup warm-up matches	12 August 2023	Loss	46 – 20
