= Fakaʻosi Pifeleti =

United States rugby union player

- Born: 19 October 1996 (age 30) Oceanside, California, United States
- Height: 1.83 m (6 ft 0 in)
- Weight: 120 kg (19 st; 260 lb)
- Notable relative: Kapeli Pifeleti (brother)

Rugby union career
- Position: Prop
Senior career
| Years | Team | Apps | (Points) |
| 2018–2021 | San Diego Legion | 39 | (20) |
| 2022 | Austin Gilgronis | 13 | (5) |
| 2023 | San Diego Legion | 15 | (15) |
| 2024 | Chicago Hounds | | |
- Correct as of 19 December 2023
International career
| Years | Team | Apps | (Points) |
| 2021– | United States | 1 | (0) |
- Correct as of 24 October 2021

Fakaʻosi Pifeleti (born 19 October 1996) is a United States rugby union player, currently playing for the Chicago Hounds of Major League Rugby (MLR) and the United States national team. His preferred position is prop.

== Professional career ==
Pifeleti signed for Major League Rugby side San Diego Legion for the 2021 Major League Rugby season, having previously represented the side since 2018. He is the brother of fellow United States rugby union international Kapeli Pifeleti.

Pifeleti debuted for United States against New Zealand during the 2021 end-of-year rugby union internationals.

Pifeleti signed by Chicago Hounds November 2024.https://www.chicagohounds.com/our-team/fakaosifolau-pifeleti/
