= Theo Sauder =

Canada international rugby union player

- Born: Theodore James Sauder; 2 April 1996 (age 30) Vancouver, British Columbia
- Height: 5 ft 11 in (1.80 m)
- Weight: 185 lb (84 kg)
- School: St. George's School
- University: University of British Columbia

Rugby union career
- Position: Fullback / Fly-half
- Current team: Toronto Arrows
Amateur team(s)
Years	Team	Apps	(Points)
2014–2018	UBC Thunderbirds		
Senior career
Years	Team	Apps	(Points)
2019–present	Toronto Arrows	5	(5)
- Correct as of 8 May 2019
Provincial / State sides
Years	Team	Apps	(Points)
2018	British Columbia Bears	2	(5)
International career
Years	Team	Apps	(Points)
2015–2016	Canada U20	7	(15)
2018–present	Canada	8	(19)
- Correct as of 6 April 2019

Theo Sauder (born 2 April 1996) is a Canadian rugby union player who plays fullback and fly-half. He currently plays for the Toronto Arrows in Major League Rugby as well as the Canada national rugby sevens team.

== Early life ==
Sauder was born in Vancouver, British Columbia, and attended St. George's School. After graduating from St. George's he attended University of British Columbia for his university studies.

== Rugby career ==
In 2015, Sauder played for Canada U20 at the 2015 World Rugby Under 20 Trophy. He played for the Canada U20s again in 2016 but lost to United States U20 19–18 in the qualifier for the 2016 World Rugby Under 20 Trophy, therefore he did not get the play in the tournament that year.

Sauder made his international debut for Canada on 9 June 2018 against Scotland. He came off the bench as a substitute in the 55th minute. Sauder scored his first points for the national team in a 65–19 win over Kenya in the first match of the 2019 Rugby World Cup Qualifying Repechage Tournament. He scored 2 tries and a conversion.

On 6 November 2018, Sauder signed with the Toronto Arrows ahead of their 2019 debut season in Major League Rugby. On 27 September 2019, he was included in the Canadian squad for the 2019 Rugby World Cup as an injury replacement to Ben LeSage.

=== Sevens ===
In June 2021, Sauder was named to Canada's 2020 Summer Olympics team.
