= Joe Taufeteʻe =

American rugby union player (born 1992)

- Full name: Joseph Soosemea Taufeteʻe
- Born: October 4, 1992 (age 34) Nuʻuuli, American Samoa, United States
- Height: 6 ft 0 in (1.83 m)
- Weight: 266 lb (121 kg; 19 st 0 lb)
- School: Vallejo High School; Garden Grove High School

Rugby union career
- Position(s): Hooker, Prop
- Current team: California Legion
Amateur team(s)
Years	Team	Apps	(Points)
2011–2013	Belmont Shore		
2014	Sciota Valley		
2014	Otorohanga		
- Correct as of March 7, 2019
Senior career
Years	Team	Apps	(Points)
2016	San Diego Breakers	8	(5)
2016–2020	Worcester Warriors	46	(30)
2020–2022	Lyon	19	(0)
2022	LA Giltinis	8	(10)
2022–2023	Leicester Tigers	5	(0)
2023	Houston SaberCats	7	(20)
2024	Seattle Seawolves	14	(42)
2025	New Orleans Gold	10	(10)
2026–	California Legion	0	(0)
- Correct as of March 20, 2026
International career
Years	Team	Apps	(Points)
2016	USA Selects	3	(0)
2015–	United States	37	(115)
- Correct as of March 27, 2024
- Football career

No. 32 – Santa Ana College Dons
- Position: Defensive tackle

Career information
- College: Santa Ana College (2010–2011)

Joseph Soosemea Taufeteʻe (born October 4, 1992) is an American rugby union player who plays as a hooker and prop for the California Legion in Major League Rugby (MLR) and the United States national team. A converted American football player, Taufeteʻe is the only American and only player from a Tier II nation, that has been nominated for the World Rugby Men's 15s Player of the Year, being nominated in 2019 while playing for the Worcester Warriors in the English Premiership.

== Early life ==
Joe Taufeteʻe was born on October 4, 1992 in Nuʻuuli, American Samoa and raised in the San Francisco Bay Area after moving with his family to California at the age of five. Of Samoan descent, Taufeteʻe played American football as a youth and aspired to playing in the NFL. Taufeteʻe attended Santa Ana College in Santa Ana, California and played at defensive tackle for school's football team during the 2010 and 2011 seasons. Taufeteʻe earned multiple All-Conference honors during his time with the team, but an ACL injury ended his aspirations of furthering his career in football.

== Rugby career ==
=== Club ===
Taufete'e began playing rugby with the Belmont Shore U-19 team while studying and playing American football at Santa Ana Community College. He then went to New Zealand to develop his rugby skills.

In early 2016, Taufete'e was signed to a professional contract by the San Diego Breakers. In December 2016, Taufete'e signed a contract to the Worcester Warriors in the English Premiership.

On February 26, 2020, Taufete signed for French side Lyon in the Top 14 ahead of the 2020–21 season. In March 2022, following the birth of his child in California, Taufete’e was granted release from Lyon and was subsequently signed by the LA Giltinis.

In August 2022 Taufete'e signed for Leicester Tigers in England's Premiership Rugby. Head coach Steve Borthwick described Taufete'e as "a powerful player, in attack and defence". He made his debut on September 18, 2022 as a replacement in a 36-21 win over Newcastle Falcons at Welford Road. He featured 5 times before leaving Tigers in April 2023 to join Houston SaberCats.

In early 2026, Taufeteʻe signed for his fifth MLR team, joining the new franchise California Legion ahead of the 2026 Major League Rugby season.

=== International ===
The uncapped Taufete'e was a surprise inclusion in the U.S. squad for the 2015 Rugby World Cup. Taufete'e debuted for the United States at the 2015 Rugby World Cup against South Africa. He also played for the U.S. at the 2016, 2017, and 2019 Americas Rugby Championships. The USA star has made 22 appearances for the Eagles, scoring 20 tries. This surpasses former Ireland great Keith Wood, a hooker, for the most international tries by any player in the tight five (i.e., either a hooker, prop, or lock).

== International tries ==
Try	Opposing team	Venue	Competition	Date	Result	Score	Ref.
1	Chile	Lockhart Stadium, Fort Lauderdale	2016 Americas Rugby Championship	February 20, 2016	Won	64–0	
2	Brazil	Athletic Club, São Paulo	2016 Americas Rugby Championship	February 27, 2016	Lost	23–24	
3	Tonga	Anoeta Stadium, San Sebastián	Test match	November 19, 2016	Lost	17–20	
4	Canada	Torero Stadium, San Diego	2019 Rugby World Cup Qualifier	July 1, 2017	Won	52–16	
5	Canada	Torero Stadium, San Diego	2019 Rugby World Cup Qualifier	July 1, 2017	Won	52–16	
6	Germany	Brita-Arena; Wiesbaden	Test match	November 18, 2017	Won	46–17	
7	Georgia	Mikheil Meskhi Stadium, Tbilisi	Test match	November 25, 2017	Lost	20–21	
8	Georgia	Mikheil Meskhi Stadium, Tbilisi	Test match	November 25, 2017	Lost	20–21	
9	Russia	Dick's Sporting Goods Park, Commerce City	Test match	June 9, 2018	Won	62–13	
10	Russia	Dick's Sporting Goods Park, Commerce City	Test match	June 9, 2018	Won	62–13	
11	Scotland	BBVA Compass Stadium, Houston	Test match	June 16, 2018	Won	30–29	
12	Scotland	BBVA Compass Stadium, Houston	Test match	June 16, 2018	Won	30–29	
13	Samoa	Anoeta Stadium, San Sebastián	Test match	November 10, 2018	Won	30–29	
14	Ireland	Aviva Stadium, Dublin	Test match	November 24, 2018	Lost	14–57	
15	Chile	Estadio Santiago Bueras; Maipu	2019 Americas Rugby Championship	February 2, 2019	Won	71–8	
16	Uruguay	Starfire Sports, Tukwila	2019 Americas Rugby Championship	March 2, 2019	Lost	25–32	
17	Uruguay	Starfire Sports, Tukwila	2019 Americas Rugby Championship	March 2, 2019	Lost	25–32	
18	Uruguay	Starfire Sports, Tukwila	2019 Americas Rugby Championship	March 2, 2019	Lost	25–32	
19	Canada	Starfire Sports, Tukwila	2019 Americas Rugby Championship	March 9, 2019	Won	30–25	
20	Canada	Starfire Sports, Tukwila	2019 Americas Rugby Championship	March 9, 2019	Won	30–25	
21	Canada	Infinity Park, Glendale, Colorado	2023 Rugby World Cup Qualifier	September 11, 2021	Won	38–16	
22	Chile	Estadio Santa Laura-Universidad SEK, Santiago	2023 Rugby World Cup Qualifier	July 9, 2022	Won	22–21	
23	Chile	Infinity Park, Glendale, Colorado	2023 Rugby World Cup Qualifier	July 16, 2022	Lost	29–31	
