= Jamie Mackenzie =

Canada international rugby union player

- Born: Jamie Mackenzie; 28 February 1989 (age 37) Oakville, Ontario, Canada
- Height: 175 cm (5 ft 9 in)
- Weight: 194 lb (88 kg)

Rugby union career
- Position: Scrum-half
- Current team: Toronto Arrows
Amateur team(s)
Years	Team	Apps	(Points)
- University of Victoria
Senior career
Years	Team	Apps	(Points)
2010-2012	Esher RFC	20	(10)
2019-2021	Toronto Arrows	10	(5)
- Correct as of 15 March 2020
Provincial / State sides
Years	Team	Apps	(Points)
2016	The Rock		
International career
Years	Team	Apps	(Points)
2010-2019	Canada	19	(5)
- Correct as of 29 April 2019

Jamie Mackenzie (born February 28, 1989) is a retired Canadian rugby union player who played scrum-half for the Toronto Arrows of Major League Rugby (MLR), and current coach of the Wilfrid Laurier Golden Hawks Mens Rugby Team.

He was a member of the Canadian squad at the 2011 Rugby World Cup. Mackenzie is the younger brother of fellow Canadian international player Phil Mackenzie.
