= Kapeli Pifeleti =

US international rugby union player (b. 1999)

- Born: September 1, 1999 (age 27) Tonga
- Height: 6 ft 1 in (1.85 m)
- Weight: 245 lb (111 kg)
- School: Haileybury College
- Notable relative: Fakaʻosi Pifeleti (brother)

Rugby union career
- Position(s): Hooker, Prop
Youth career
- 2017–2018: Saracens
Senior career
Years	Team	Apps	(Points)
2019–2025	Saracens	49	(25)
2019	→ San Diego Legion (loan)	15	(0)
2025–	Provence	0	(0)
- Correct as of 31 January 2025
International career
Years	Team	Apps	(Points)
2018	England U18	2	(0)
2018–	USA Selects	0	(0)
2019–	United States	8	(5)
- Correct as of 11 July 2022

Kapeli Pifeleti (born September 1, 1999) is a rugby union player who plays as a hooker and prop for Provence in Pro D2 and the United States national team. Born in Tonga, Pifeleti has also represented the United States with the USA Selects and England with the England U18 team.

== Club career ==
=== Saracens ===
Pifeleti played for Saracens in 2017 and 2018, making appearances with the Saracens Storm and Saracens Under-18 sides.

Pifeleti came off the bench as a substitute during the 2021–22 Premiership Rugby final which Saracens lost against Leicester Tigers to finish runners up. The following season saw him make ten appearances for Saracens as they became league champions. In total Pifeleti played 49 games for Saracens.

=== San Diego Legion ===
In late 2018, it was announced that Pifeleti would play for the San Diego Legion during Major League Rugby's 2019 season. Pifeleti made his debut for the Legion on January 27, 2019, appearing as a substitute and playing at prop, in a 25–23 defeat to Rugby New York. Pifeleti made his first start for the Legion on February 9, 2019, playing at hooker, in a 17–13 victory over Houston.

=== Provence ===
In January 2025 it was announced that Pifeleti had joined Provence Rugby.

== International career ==
=== England under-18 team ===
Pifeleti was named to the roster for the England national under-18 team in 2018. In March 2018 he came off the bench as a substitute as England defeated Wales U18.

=== USA Selects ===
Having lived several years in San Francisco while growing up, Pifeleti was eligible to play for the USA. Pifeleti was named to the roster for the USA Selects ahead of the 2018 Americas Pacific Challenge. However, he did not make an appearance for the team during the competition.

=== USA Eagles ===
Pifeleti made his debut for the USA Eagles on February 23, 2019, appearing as a substitute, in the Eagles' 33–28 victory over Brazil during the 2019 Americas Rugby Championship. Pifeleti qualified to represent the United States by meeting World Rugby's residency requirement.

== Personal life ==
Pifeleti has an older brother, Fakaʻosi Pifeleti, who also plays rugby as a prop for the Chicago Hounds. Their father, ʻOtenili Pifeleti, played rugby for the Tonga national and Samoa national teams, and served as captain of the former during the 1980s.
