= Cole Keith =

Canadian rugby union player (born 1977)

- Full name: Cole Vance Keith
- Born: 7 May 1997 (age 29) Saint John, New Brunswick
- Height: 6 ft 0 in (183 cm)
- Weight: 255 lb (116 kg; 18 st 3 lb)

Rugby union career
- Position: Prop
Senior career
Years	Team	Apps	(Points)
2019−22	Toronto Arrows	46	(15)
2023-	New England Free Jacks	34	(0)
2023	Manawatu	8	(0)
- Correct as of 7 March 2020
Provincial / State sides
Years	Team	Apps	(Points)
2017−2018	Atlantic Rock		
International career
Years	Team	Apps	(Points)
2017	Canada U20	6	(15)
2017-	Canada A	6	(0)
2017-	Canada	40	(0)
- Correct as of 24 October 2019

Cole Keith (born 7 May 1997) is a Canadian rugby union player who currently plays as a prop for the New England Free Jacks of Major League Rugby (MLR). He also represents Team Canada internationally.

== Rugby career ==
In 2016 he moved to Victoria, British Columbia, where he joined the James Bay Athletic Association in the BC Premier League and also participated in Rugby Canada’s centralized program.

Keith would sign with the Toronto Arrows in 2019 playing with the club till 2022. During this time he would make 46 appearances for scoring 3 tries.

He would sign with the New England free jacks in 2023. Being part of 3 straight championship teams.

He would also make 8 appearances for Manawatu during the 2023 season.

=== International career ===
Keith previously represented Canada A national team and the U20 team.

Keith made his international debut for Canada against Chile on 11 February 2017.

Keith was included in the Canadian squad for the 2019 Rugby World Cup which was held in Japan for the first time. It also marks his first World Cup appearance.

== Club statistics ==
As of 10 March 2020

Season	Team	Games	Starts	Sub	Tries	Cons	Pens	Drops	Points	Yel	Red
MLR 2019	Toronto Arrows	13	3	10	0	0	0	0	0	0	0
MLR 2020	Toronto Arrows	5	4	1	0	0	0	0	0	0	0
MLR 2021	Toronto Arrows	12	9	3	0	0	0	0	0	0	0
MLR 2022	Toronto Arrows	1	1	0	0	0	0	0	0	0	0
Total		31	17	14	0	0	0	0	0	0	0

== Honours ==
New England Free Jacks

- Major League Rugby Championship: 3x (2023, 2024, 2025)
