= Pat Parfrey =

Canada international rugby union player

- Born: November 1, 1991 (age 35)
- Height: 1.85 m (6 ft 1 in)
- Weight: 95 kg (209 lb)

Rugby union career
- Position: Fly half
Senior career
Years	Team	Apps	(Points)
2019-2021	Toronto Arrows	7	(0)
- Correct as of 20 June 2019
International career
Years	Team	Apps	(Points)
2014-	Canada A	8	(10)
2013-	Canada	30	(30)
- Correct as of 9 September 2019

Pat Parfrey (born November 1, 1991) is a Canadian international rugby union player who plays for the Toronto Arrows of Major League Rugby (MLR). He was also a replacement player at the 2015 Rugby World Cup.

Parfrey joined the Toronto Arrows in April 2019. He made his Major League Rugby debut on April 28 as a second-half substitute in a 29–7 win over the Seattle Seawolves.
