= Tadhg Leader =

US international rugby union & gridiron player

Personal information
- Born: 1 March 1992 (age 34) Galway, Ireland
- Education: Cistercian College; Lindenwood University; Lasell University (MBA)
- Height: 189 cm (6 ft 2 in)
- Weight: 93 kg (205 lb; 14 st 9 lb)
- Relative: Darragh Leader (brother)
- Football career

Profile
- Position: Placekicker

Career history
- Panthers Wrocław (2021); Hamilton Tiger-Cats (2022)*
- * Offseason or practice squad member only
- Stats at CFL.ca

Rugby union career
- Position: Fly-half
- Current team: New England Free Jacks
Youth career
- -: Galwegians
Amateur team(s)
Years	Team	Apps	(Points)
2014–2015	Rugby Badia ASD		
2015	Lindenwood Lions		
2016–2017	St. Louis Royals		
Senior career
Years	Team	Apps	(Points)
2011–2014	Connacht		
2018	San Diego Legion	7	(42)
2018–present	New England Free Jacks	2	(11)
2019	→ New Orleans Gold (loan)	1	(0)
- Correct as of 12 December 2020
International career
Years	Team	Apps	(Points)
2011	Ireland U19		
2012	Ireland U20		
2019–	United States	2	(11)
- Correct as of 12 December 2020

Tadhg Leader (born 1 March 1992) is an Irish-born rugby union player and gridiron football placekicker.

He has also played for American professional rugby union club New England Free Jacks in Major League Rugby (MLR). Leader was born and raised in Ireland, but after living in the United States for several years, qualified to play for the United States national rugby union team. His primary position is at fly-half, though he has also played at inside center.

== Early life ==
Born in Galway, Leader grew up in Castlegar, just outside the city. He is a past pupil of the Bish, one of the city's secondary schools, and the Cistercian College in Roscrea. Leader is the older brother of current Connacht player Darragh Leader. Greg, the eldest brother, played for the province at underage level. Their parents were also heavily involved in sport, with their mother, Breda, serving as secretary for Rowing Ireland and their father, Noel, having played for and served as president of the Galwegians rugby club, where Leader first played the sport.

== Rugby career ==
=== Connacht ===
Leader graduated secondary school and signed for the Connacht academy in 2011. Later that year, Leader played an integral role in the Connacht under-20 grand slam winning team. Leader was brought into the Connacht senior squad for the 2012–13 season. Leader made multiple appearances for the Connacht Eagles in the British and Irish Cup. After multiple injury setbacks Leader left Connacht and signed with Italian club Rugby Badia ASD.

=== Rugby Badia ASD ===
Leader arrived in Italy to play with Rugby Badia ASD in Italy's Serie A rugby competition. A few months into his time in Italy a shoulder injury forced him to return to Ireland for surgery.

=== Lindenwood University ===
In 2015, whilst recovering from a shoulder reconstruction Leader received a rugby scholarship at Lindenwood University in St. Charles, Missouri to play for the school's college rugby side the Lindenwood Lions. During his time at Lindenwood, Leader pursued an undergraduate degree in sports management. Leader was selected to play in the Lindenwood team that represented the United States at the Red Bull World Uni 7's in Bath in England. However, shortly after arriving, Leader was ruled ineligible to represent the university in intercollegiate matches due to his time spent as a professional player in Ireland and Italy.

=== St. Louis Royals ===
Leader linked up with local club the St. Louis Royals in 2016, whilst continuing his studies at Lindenwood. As captain-coach Leader led the Royals to a DIII national championship in 2017. Leader was also named player's MVP of the Royals after the 2017 season.

=== San Diego Legion ===
In January 2018, Leader signed a two-year contract with the San Diego Legion of Major League Rugby.

=== International rugby career ===
In April 2011, Leader was selected for the Ireland under-19 squad for their game against France. Later that year in December 2011, Leader was selected as part of Mike Ruddock's squad for the Ireland under-20s in preparation for the 2012 under-20 Six Nations tournament.

Having lived in the United States since 2015, under the World Rugby three-year residency rule, Leader became eligible in 2018 to play for the United States. Leader was called up to the U.S. squad for the 2019 Americas Rugby Championship.

== Gridiron football ==
In 2020, Leader attempted to become an NFL placekicker. He joined The Spring League's Aviators for the 2021 season. Following week 6 of the 2021 European League of Football season, Leader signed with the Wrocław Panthers.

On February 23, 2022, Leader signed with the Canadian Football League's Hamilton Tiger-Cats. However, he was released before the start of the regular season on June 5, 2022.

=== Leader kicking ===
In 2022, Leader established a sports agency focusing on recruiting players to the NFL via the International Player Pathway. The agency proved successful with numerous players receiving sports scholarships to US universities and signing with NFL teams including Charlie Smyth.
