= Gastón Mieres =

Uruguayan rugby union player

- Born: October 5, 1989 (age 37) Punta del Este, Uruguay
- Height: 5 ft 10 in (1.78 m)
- Weight: 178 lb (81 kg; 11 st)

Rugby union career
- Position: Fullback
Amateur team(s)
Years	Team	Apps	(Points)
- Lobos
Senior career
Years	Team	Apps	(Points)
2014–2015	Valpolicella		
2015–2016	Coventry		
2018–pres.	Toronto Arrows	12	(35)
- Correct as of 3 March 2020
International career
Years	Team	Apps	(Points)
2010–pres.	Uruguay	67	(65)
- Correct as of 7 September 2019
National sevens team
Years	Team		Comps
2010–pres.	Uruguay 7s		

Gastón Mieres (born 5 October 1989 in Punta del Este, Uruguay) is a Uruguayan rugby union player who plays for Canadian club Toronto Arrows in Major League Rugby (MLR) and the Uruguay national rugby union team Los Teros as a fullback.

== Career ==
Mieres began playing rugby at a young age for Lobos, the only rugby team in his birthplace of Punta del Este, Uruguay. Due to his great speed and footwork, as well as a remarkable skill for tackling he was selected to play for the national youth teams throughout every category.

In 2010, he received his first full cap for the first team of Los Teros and then went on to alternate between Los Teros XV's team and the 7's team, depending on each's calendar.

Mieres began playing professionally in 2014 for Rugby Club Valpolicella of Verona, Italy of the second tier of the Italian Rugby Union championship, after outstanding performances in several test matches and the 2015 Rugby World Cup qualifyings.

He has played at the 2011 Rugby World Cup qualifying and at the 2015 Rugby World Cup qualifying, where Los Teros achieved the feat of beating Russia in the playoffs for the last place at the World Cup.

Of the 31 players included in the Los Teros squad for the 2015 Rugby World Cup, only four were playing at a professional level (Mieres, Felipe Berchesi, Agustín Ormaechea and Mario Sagario). It is for this reason that obtaining the last spot for the 2015 Rugby World Cup was such an exceptional accomplishment since it made Los Teros the only team composed of amateur players out of the 20 taking part in the tournament.

Mieres ranked third in the Most Offloads Made ranking of the 2015 Rugby World Cup during the group stage for having made seven offloads, the same as world renowned offloader Sonny Bill Williams of the New Zealand All Blacks.

In November 2015, Mieres was tested on a week trial on Coventry Rugby Club, till he finally signed a short contract with the team. The player returned to Lobos in early 2016.

He signed with Canadian club Toronto Arrows ahead of the 2019 Major League Rugby season.
