= Mike Sheppard (rugby union) =

Canadian rugby union player

- Born: December 20, 1988 (age 37)
- Height: 6 ft 4 in (1.93 m)
- Weight: 245 lb (111 kg; 17 st 7 lb)
- University: McMaster University

Rugby union career
- Position: Lock / Flanker
Amateur team(s)
Years	Team	Apps	(Points)
- Stoney Creek Camels RFC
Senior career
Years	Team	Apps	(Points)
2019-	Toronto Arrows	17	(25)
- Correct as of 18 February 2020
Provincial / State sides
Years	Team	Apps	(Points)
2013-	Ontario Blues		
International career
Years	Team	Apps	(Points)
2016-	Canada A	4	(0)
2018-	Canada	8	(5)
- Correct as of 28 July 2019

Michael Sheppard aka ‘Shep’ (born December 20, 1988) is a Canadian rugby union player. He played Lock and Flanker for the Toronto Arrows in Major League Rugby (MLR) from their exhibition year in 2018 - 2023.

== Professional career ==
On November 11, 2018, he made his international debut for Canada as a substitute against Kenya and scored a try in the 69th minute.

Sheppard played for the Ontario Blues. He previously played Ontario University Athletics rugby for McMaster University and played club rugby for Stoney Creek Camels RFC.

After captaining the Toronto Arrows during their exhibition season in 2018 he has signed on again with the club to play in their first season of Major League Rugby in 2019.

In 2021 was forwards coach of Humber Hawks. For the 2022 season, he was named captain of the Toronto Arrows.
