= Mario Sagario =

Uruguayan rugby union player

- Born: June 29, 1986 (age 40) Montevideo, Uruguay
- Height: 1.87 m (6 ft 1 1/2 in)
- Weight: 116 kg (18.3 st; 256 lb)

Rugby union career
- Position: Prop
Amateur team(s)
Years	Team	Apps	(Points)
2006–2009	Carrasco Polo Club		
Senior career
Years	Team	Apps	(Points)
2010–2011	Dax	10	(0)
2011–2012	Santboiana		
2012–2015	Massy	39	(0)
2015–2016	Munster	12	(0)
- Correct as of 26 March 2016
International career
Years	Team	Apps	(Points)
2006–2019	Uruguay	70	(5)
- Correct as of 16 Dec 2019

Mario Sagario (born 29 June 1986) is a Uruguayan rugby union player who plays as a prop for Carrasco Polo Club and the Uruguayan national rugby union team.

== Club career ==
Sagario started his career in Uruguay playing for Carrasco Polo Club in 2006.

In mid 2009, he moved to France to play for US Dax. He spent a year playing in the reserves until he signed his first professional contract in August 2010. On 5 December 2010, he made his debut in the 24–13 away loss against Stade Montois. He played a total of 10 matches during the 2010–11 season.

On 21 August 2011, Sagario signed a new deal with Spanish side UE Santboiana. He played one season at the club, before returning to France to play for Pro D2 club RC Massy.

Sagario signed a three-month contract with Irish Pro12 side Munster in October 2015. His contract was extended for the rest of the 2015–16 season.

In mid 2016, he returned to his country to play again for Carrasco Polo Club.

== International career ==
Sagario has earned 51 caps for Uruguay since 2006, scoring one try. He was involved in the 2007, 2011 and 2015 Rugby World Cup qualifiers.

In mid 2014, he suffered an injury which prevented him from playing in the 2015 Rugby World Cup – repechage qualification matches against Hong Kong and Russia.

In May 2015, he returned to the national team and later was called up for the 2015 Rugby World Cup.
