= Dell Diamond =

Baseball stadium in Round Rock, Texas

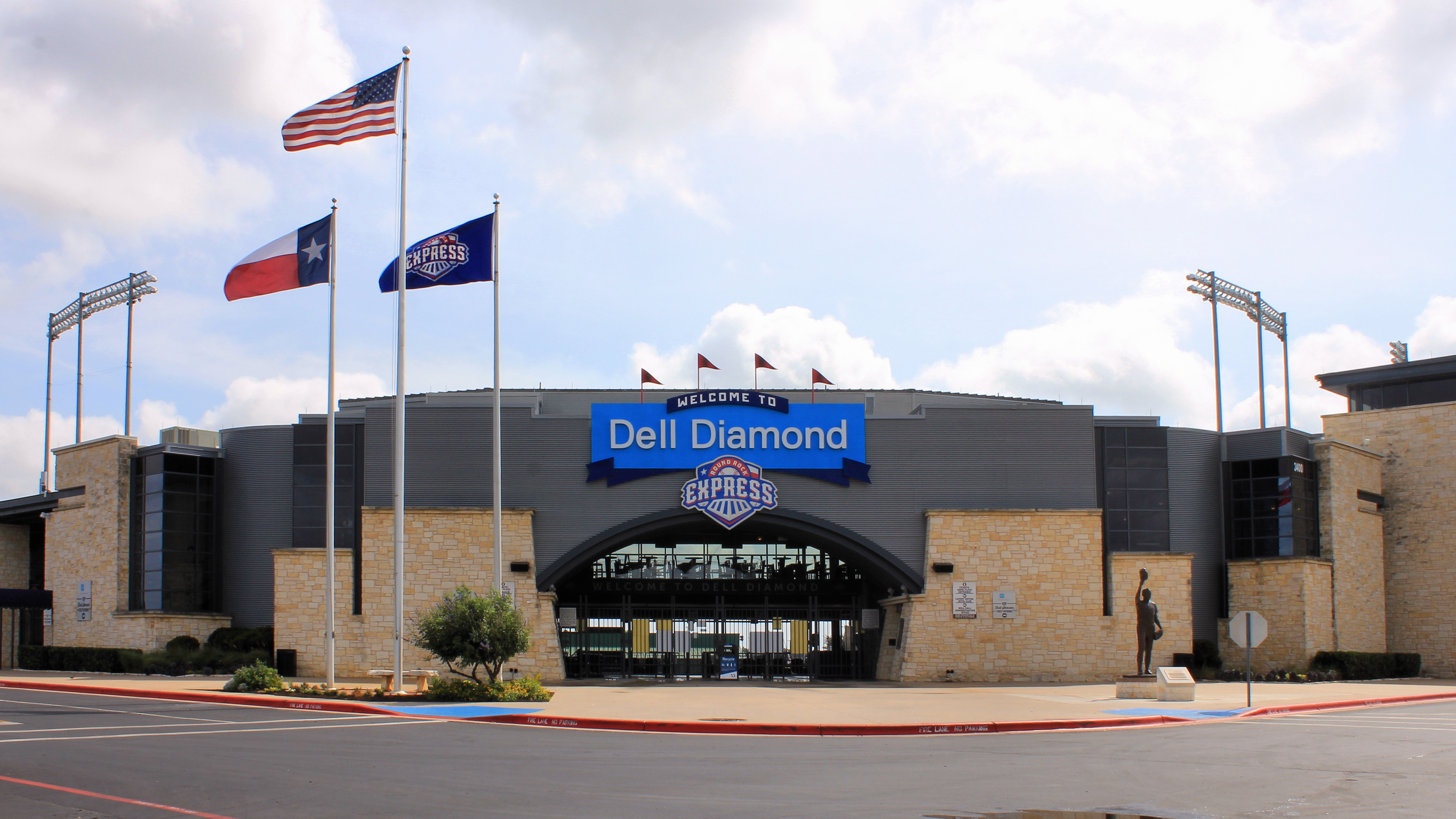
- Dell Diamond in 2017

- Location within Texas Location within the United States
- Location: 3400 East Palm Valley Boulevard; Round Rock, Texas; United States
- Coordinates: 30.5273°N 97.6305°W
- Owner: City of Round Rock
- Operator: Ryan Sanders Baseball LP
- Capacity: 11,631
- Surface: TifTuf Bermuda grass
- Record attendance: 13,475 (June 16, 2006)
- Field size: Left field: 335 feet (102 m); Center field: 400 feet (120 m); Right field: 325 feet (99 m)

Construction
- Groundbreaking: February 26, 1999
- Opened: April 16, 2000
- Cost: $25 million ($46.7 million in 2025 dollars)
- Architect: HKS, Inc.
- Project managers: The Madison Group, Ltd.
- Structural engineer: HKS, Inc.
- Services engineers: Blum Consulting Engineers, Inc.
- General contractor: Hensel Phelps

Tenants
- Round Rock Express (TL/PCL) (2000–present); Texas Volts (AUSL) (2026–present); Austin Elite (MLR) (2019)

Dell Diamond is the home stadium of the Round Rock Express, the Triple-A Minor League Baseball affiliate of the Texas Rangers major league baseball team, in Round Rock, Texas, United States. On April 16, 2000, the then-Double-A affiliate Express played their first home game at the stadium.

Dell Diamond is built on 85 acres (344,000 m^{2}) of former farmland on the east side of Round Rock, a rapidly growing suburban city northeast of Austin. Nolan Ryan and his son Reid Ryan, part owners of the Express, originally wanted a stadium inside the city of Austin, but found a more attractive site in the City of Round Rock, with support from the city leadership. The city of Round Rock contributed $7.35 million to the $25 million cost of the facility. The city owns the ballpark and gave the Express a 38-year lease. Local-based computer technology company Dell contracted for naming rights in a deal that will cost the company $2.5 million over 15 years.

== Events ==
The stadium has also hosted several college games, including some early-season University of Texas contests in 2007 while the Longhorns' home field, UFCU Disch-Falk Field, was undergoing a major renovation project. A showcase neutral-site game was played on February 21, 2012, between the Baylor Bears and Texas State Bobcats. Dell Diamond is also the designated site for the University Interscholastic League state baseball tournament. On February 13, 2016, the stadium hosted a rugby union match between Canada and USA Rugby, as part of the Americas Rugby Championship.

On June 25, 2007, Manny Parra, pitcher for the visiting Nashville Sounds, pitched a perfect game against the Round Rock Express at the ballpark.

On July 11, 2001, the ballpark hosted the Double-A All-Star Game in which a team of National League-affiliated All-Stars defeated a team of American League-affiliated All-Stars, 8–3, before 12,046 people in attendance.

In 2004, Nicole Richie & Paris Hilton "worked" at the stadium for the day. This was filmed as a part of a Season 2 episode of The Simple Life, their reality TV show.

In October 2016, the stadium hosted the Traxxas Monster Truck Destruction Tour prior to the field's being resurfaced.

From September 2017 to mid-March 2018, the stadium was transformed into a set for the fourth season of television's Fear the Walking Dead. As a result, the field had to be resurfaced again because vegetables had been planted on it and the grass had been killed with chemicals to attain a post-apocalyptic look.

== Rugby union ==
In 2019, the Austin Elite, of Major League Rugby, announced Dell Diamond as their home stadium for the 2019 season. Dell Diamond has also hosted international matches for the Americas Rugby Championship.

Date	Visiting	Score	Home	Competition	Event	Attendance
February 13, 2016	Canada	22–30	United States	World Rugby	ARC	7,415
February 11, 2017	Brazil	3–51	United States	World Rugby	ARC	
February 23, 2019	Brazil	28–33	United States	World Rugby	ARC	

== Gallery ==
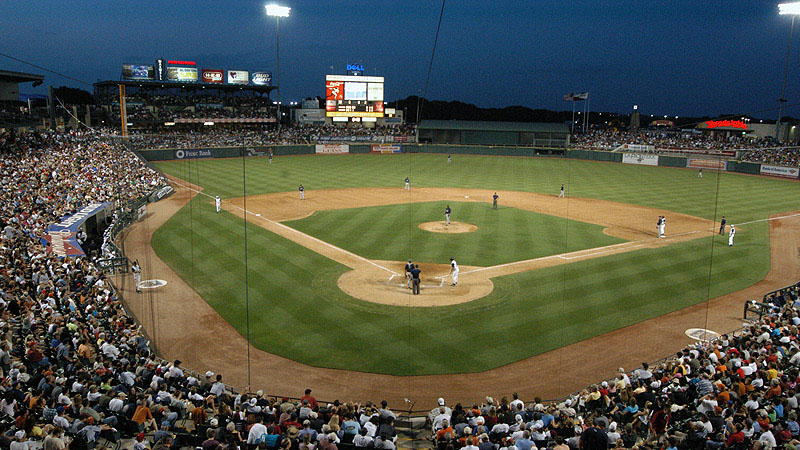
The Dell Diamond is the home field for the Round Rock Express.

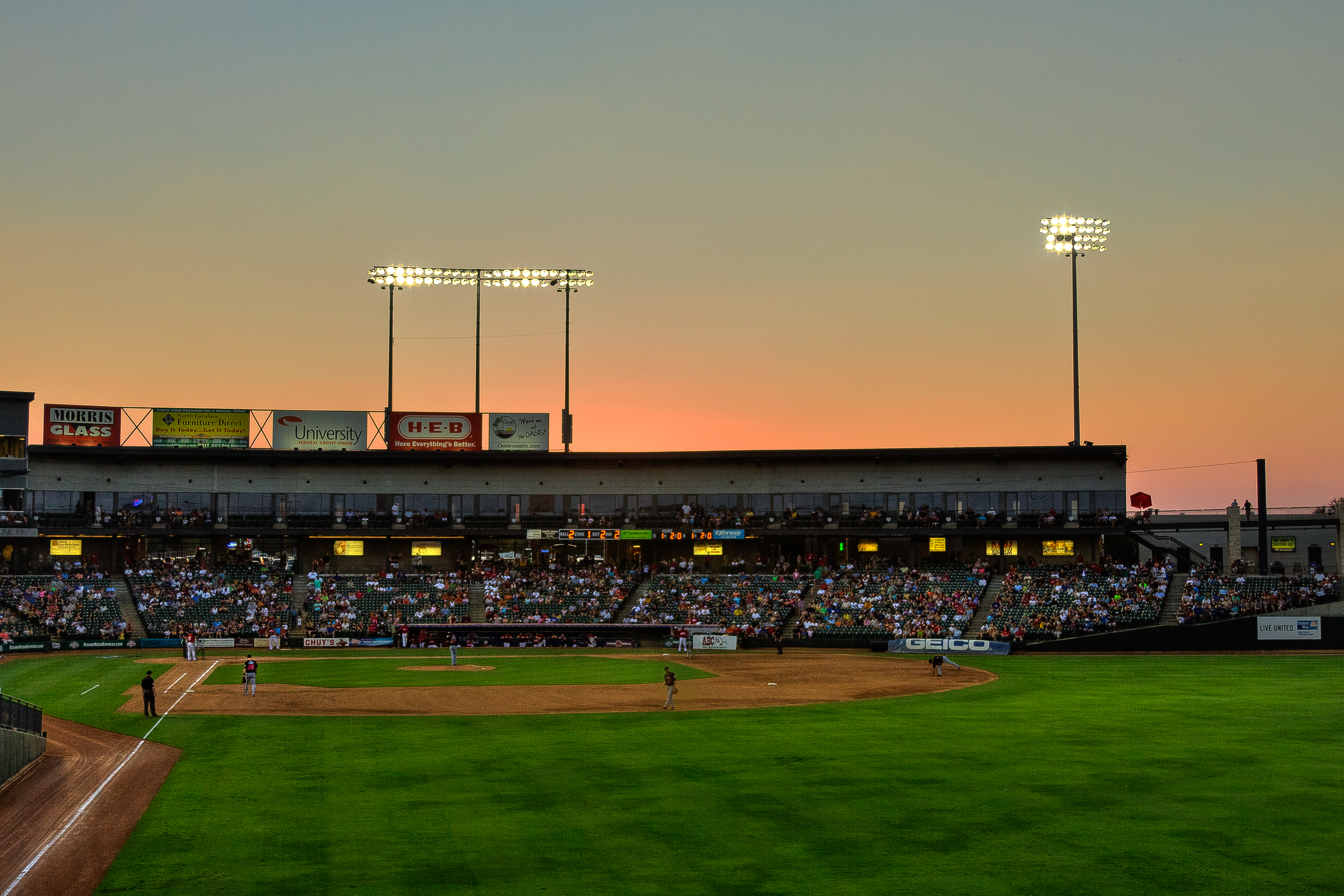
The third base stands as seen from right field on September 3, 2011
