= Dino Waldren =

American rugby union player (born 1991)

- Born: July 11, 1991 (age 35) Crockett, California, U.S.
- Height: 6 ft 0 in (1.83 m)
- Weight: 245 lb (17 st 7 lb; 111 kg)
- School: De La Salle High School
- University: Saint Mary's College of California

Rugby union career
- Position: Prop
- Current team: NOLA Gold
Amateur team(s)
Years	Team	Apps	(Points)
- Blackrock College RFC
Senior career
Years	Team	Apps	(Points)
2017–2018	London Scottish	15	(25)
2019	San Diego Legion	5	(0)
2020–	New Orleans Gold	5	(10)
- Correct as of 30 December 2020
International career
Years	Team	Apps	(Points)
2016–	United States	21	(5)
- Correct as of 10 July 2021

Dino Waldren (born July 11, 1991) is an American rugby union player who plays the prop position for NOLA Gold in Major League Rugby (MLR). He also plays for the United States national rugby union team.

He previously played for the London Scottish professional team in the English second division, the RFU Championship.

== Career ==
Waldren is from Crockett, California, in the San Francisco Bay Area. He attended De La Salle High School. He played college rugby with the Saint Mary's Gaels in California, and was named as an All-American in 2015 and again in 2016. During autumn 2016, Waldren played for Blackrock College in Dublin, in Division 2A of the All-Ireland League. Waldren signed with the London Scottish in August 2017 for the 2017–18 season.

== U.S. national team ==
Waldren debuted for the U.S. national team during the November 2016 tests under head coach John Mitchell, coming on as a substitute against Romania. Waldren also featured for the U.S. during 2017, playing in both the 2017 Americas Rugby Championship and the June international tests.
