= Estadio Santiago Bueras =

Multi-use stadium in Maipu, Chile

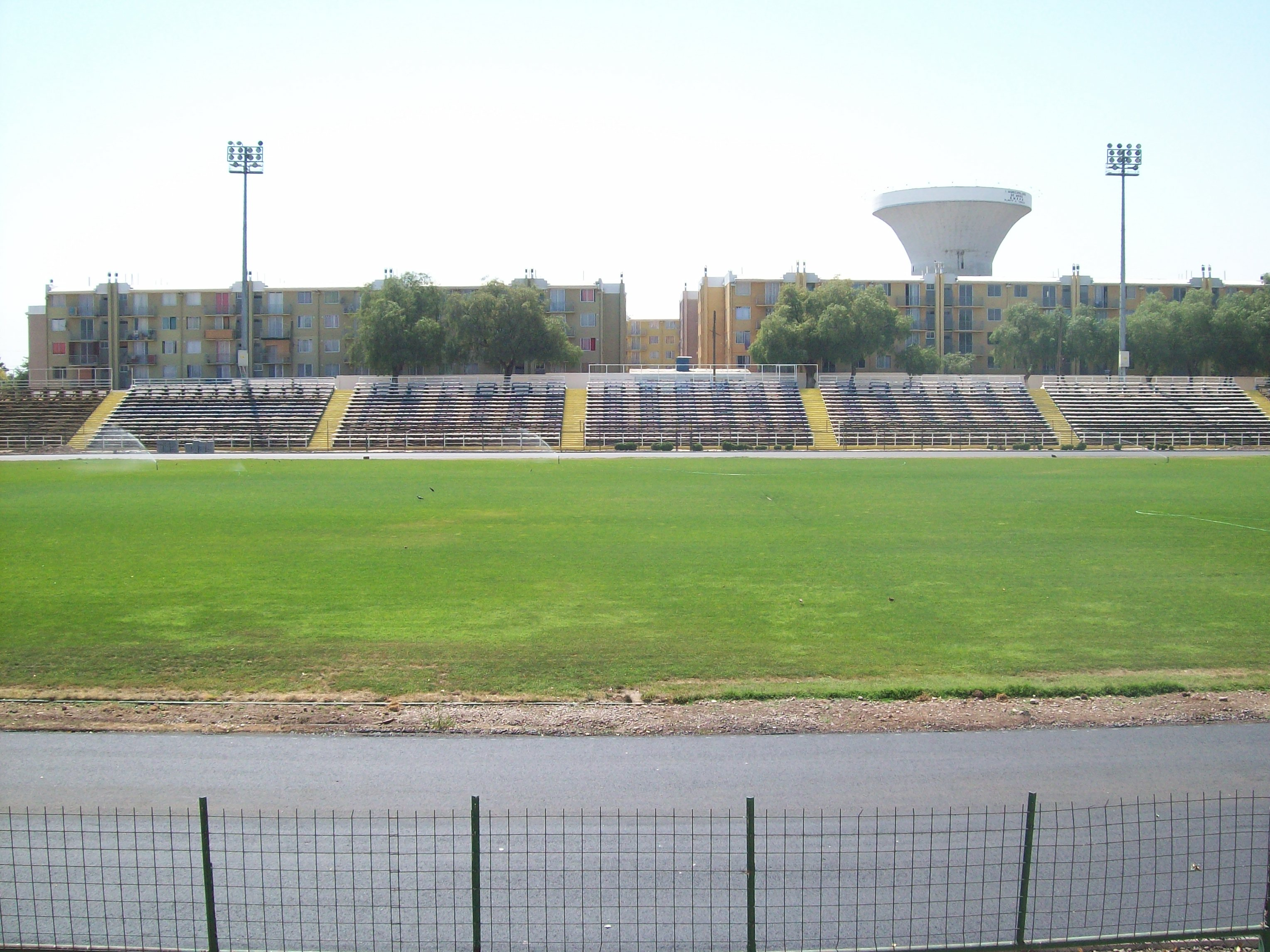
- Turf, bleachers and running track.
- Interactive map of Estadio Santiago Bueras
- Location: Maipu, Chile
- Coordinates: 33°30′26.85″S 70°44′56.84″W
- Owner: Municipality of Maipu
- Capacity: 3,402
- Surface: grass

Construction
- Opened: 1984

Tenant
- Santiago Morning

Estadio Santiago Bueras is a multi-use stadium in Maipu, Chile. It is currently used mostly for football matches and is the home stadium of Santiago Morning. The stadium holds 3,400 people and was built in 1984.

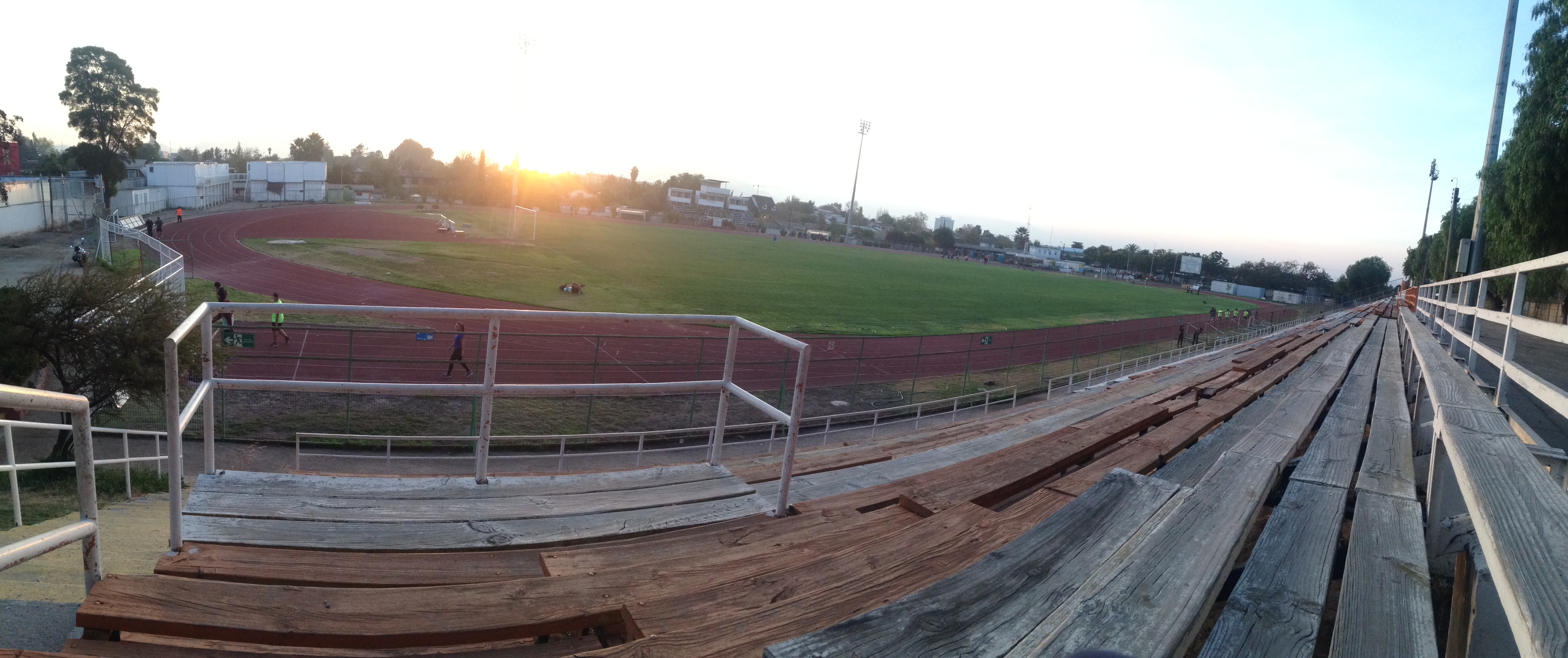
Panoramic view of the stadium
