= Toronto Arrows =

Professional rugby union team from Toronto, Ontario, Canada

- Full name: Toronto Arrows
- Nickname: Arrows
- Founded: Ontario Arrows; 2017–2018; Toronto Arrows since 2018
- Disbanded: 2023; 3 years ago
- Location: Toronto, Ontario, Canada
- Ground: York Lions Stadium (Capacity: 4,000)
- Most caps: Mike Sheppard (58)
- Top scorer: Sam Malcolm (370)
- Most tries: Gastón Mieres (15)
- League: Major League Rugby
- 2023: Eastern Conference: 6th Playoffs: DNQ
Home kit

Toronto Arrows R.F.C. was a rugby union club based in Toronto, Ontario, Canada, that played in Major League Rugby. The Arrows team was an independent off-shoot of the Ontario Blues provincial programme and was funded by a group of private investors and supporters. They are currently on hiatus following the 2023 season.

== History ==
=== 2017–2018: Ontario Arrows ===
Ontario Arrows' logo
(2017–18)

Toronto Arrows first logo
(2018-23)

The team was founded as the Ontario Arrows in 2017 with the intent of joining the Major League Rugby (MLR) competition for the 2019 season. The Arrows debuted September 9, 2017, in a match against the Glendale Merlins losing 41–7.

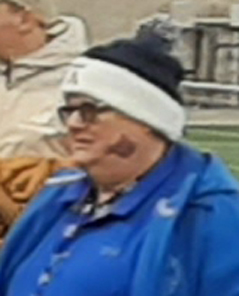
Co-founder and president Bill Webb

In spring 2018, the Arrows played a six-game exhibition schedule against the Houston SaberCats, Rugby United New York, Utah Warriors, and Boston's Mystic River Rugby Club. The schedule was extended to include games against the Canada Selects. The Arrows' 2018 home opener was a decided victory over the Mystic River Rugby Club.

In July 2018, the Arrows announced that MLR had granted them exclusive rights to negotiate for a franchise in Ontario. In November 2018, MLR announced that the Arrows had joined the league for the 2019 season. At the same time, the Ontario Arrows changed their name to the Toronto Arrows. The ownership group is led by Bill Webb, partner and chief investment officer at Waypoint Investment Partners. The ownership group also includes the former general manager of the Toronto Maple Leafs Brian Burke, Boat Rocker Sports (a division of Boat Rocker Media), Duncan McNaughton, an assistant coach with the Canadian women's team and the Queen's University men, Kevin Reed of AR3 Capital, and John Ferraro of Mass Marketing Inc. As MLR operates as a single entity league, the ownership group purchased an equity stake in the league, at the cost of a few million dollars, and received operating rights to a franchise in the Toronto market.

=== 2019–2021: First MLR seasons ===
In the 2019 season the team split its home games between Alumni Field of York University and Lamport Stadium in its inaugural 2019 MLR season.

After playing only five matches in 2020, the Arrows ceased play, along with the rest of the league, as the COVID-19 pandemic began. Due to border crossing concerns related to the COVID-19 pandemic during the 2021 season, the Arrows temporarily relocated to Marietta, Georgia, to share Rugby ATL's facilities at Lupo Family Field.

=== 2022–2023: Final seasons ===
For the 2022 season, the Arrows hosted their game against the LA Giltinis at Starlight Stadium in Langford, British Columbia, marking the first MLR regular season game to be held in the province. The remainder of their home games were played at the renovated York Lions Stadium, over 1,000 days after the team's previous home game in Toronto.

On August 30, 2023, the Arrows announced the passing of president and general partner, Bill Webb. Bill Webb's passing resulted in an outpouring of support from across the rugby world, including players, teams, leagues and foundations. On November 27, 2023, it was announced that the Arrows would not compete in the 2024 MLR season.

== Broadcasts ==
For 2019, home games were shown on GameTV. Lincoln Rose and Kit McConnico were the on-air talent.

For 2020, TSN was announced as the Arrows broadcast partner. Following the cancellation of the 2020 Major League Rugby season, TSN produced a 10-episode series, showing 60-minute highlights from chosen Arrows games, called "Arrows in an Hour."

== Sponsorship ==
Season	Kit manufacturer	Shirt sponsor	Other shirt sponsor(s)
2018	XBlades	Waypoint Investment Partners	Blackshire Capital; Dineen Coffee; 360centre360
2019	XBlades	Honda Canada	Waypoint Investment Partners
2020–2021	Paladin Sports	Honda Canada	Waypoint Investment Partners
2022	Paladin Sports	Coolbet Canada	Waypoint Investment Partners
2023	Paladin Sports	TIRF (Toronto Inner-City Rugby Foundation)	Metro Supply Chain Group; Foundation Physiotherapy & Wellness

== Players and personnel ==
=== Head coaches ===
- (Canada) Chris Silverthorn (2019–2021)
- (Australia) Peter Smith (2021–2023)
- (Australia) Stephen Meehan (2023)

=== Captains ===
- Lucas Rumball, Dan Moor (2019) (co-captains)
- Dan Moor, Lucas Rumball (2020) (co-captains)
- Lucas Rumball, Ben LeSage (2021) (co-captains)
- Mike Sheppard (2022)
  - Lucas Rumball, Sam Malcolm (Vice captains)
- Lucas Rumball (2023)
  - Sam Malcolm, Mike Sheppard (Vice captains)

=== Team staff ===
As of January 2023, the members of the team staff are:

- Peter Smith — Head Coach
- Rob Howley — Attack Coach
- Francois Ratier – Defence & Skills Coach
- Francisco Deformes — Forwards Coach
- Cory Hector — Arrows Academy Director & Head Coach
- Alex Lee – Head of Performance
- Shane Cahill – Assistant Strength & Conditioning Coach
- Richard Owen – Head Performance Analyst
- Neil MacDougall – Team Manager
- Scott Shannon — Head Athletic Therapist
- Chris Chan – Senior Team Physiotherapist
- Terri Jones – Academy Athletic Therapist
- Dr. John Gillis – Head Team Physician
- Chris Silverthorn – Director of Player Development

=== Front office ===
- Bill Webb – President and General Partner
- Tim Matthews – Vice President and General Manager
- Rahul Srinivasan – Chief Commercial Officer
- Mark Winokur – Co-Founder and Special Advisor

== Records ==
=== Season standings ===
Season	Conference	Regular season										Postseason						
Season	Conference	Pos	Pld	W	D	L	F	A	+/−	BP	Pts	Pld	W	L	F	A	+/−	Result
2019	–	3rd	16	11	0	5	472	362	+110	13	57	1	0	1	17	30	−13	Lost Semifinal (Seattle Seawolves) 17–30
2020 (Note: 2020 regular season shortened and playoffs cancelled due to the COVID-19 pandemic.)	Eastern	1st	5	4	0	1	151	89	+62	3	19	–	–	–	–	–	–	Cancelled
2021	Eastern	6th	16	5	0	11	411	412	−1	10	30	–	–	–	–	–	–	Did not qualify
2022	Eastern	4th	16	8	0	8	414	390	+24	9	41	–	–	–	–	–	–	Did not qualify
2023	Eastern	6th	16	1	2	13	306	601	-295	8	16	–	–	–	–	–	–	Did not qualify
Totals			69	29	2	38	1,754	1,854	-100	43	163	1	0	1	17	30	-13	1 postseason appearance

== 2018 season (exhibition) ==
All games in the 2018 season were exhibition games and did not count in the league standings.

Date	Opponent	Home/Away	Location	Result
March 3	Houston SaberCats	Away	Constellation Field	Draw, 28–28
March 17	Rugby United New York	Away	Mazzella Field	Lost, 19–36
April 6	Utah Warriors	Away	Rio Tinto Stadium	Won, 24–20
April 14	Rugby United New York	Home	York Alumni Stadium	Cancelled due to weather
April 21	Mystic River Rugby Club	Away	Pine Banks Park	Won, 29–19
May 5	Mystic River Rugby Club	Home	York Alumni Stadium	Won, 77–8
May 18	Canada Selects	Home	York Lions Stadium	Lost, 0–19
May 26	Canada Selects	Away	Westhills Stadium	Lost, 28–58

== 2019 season ==
=== Exhibition ===
Date	Opponent	Home/Away	Location	Result
September 16, 2018	Glendale Raptors	Home	York Lions Stadium	Won, 40–18
October 20, 2018	New England Free Jacks	Home	Wanderers Grounds	Won, 40–14
January 12, 2019	Rugby United New York	Neutral	Buffalo Bills Fieldhouse	Postponed
May 18, 2019	New England Free Jacks	Away	Brophy Field at Dartmouth's; Corey Ford Rugby Clubhouse	Postponed

=== Regular season ===
Date	Opponent	Home/Away	Location	Result
January 26	New Orleans Gold	Away	Eagle Athletic Facility	Lost, 31–36
February 8	Austin Elite	Away	Dell Diamond	Won, 23–19
February 17	Seattle Seawolves	Away	Starfire Stadium	Lost, 30–35
February 22	Houston SaberCats	Away	Aveva Stadium	Won, 44–27
March 2	Glendale Raptors	Away	Infinity Park	Lost, 0–22
March 10	San Diego Legion	Away	Torero Stadium	Won, 27–20
March 15	Rugby United New York	Away	MCU Park	Lost, 21–24
March 30	Utah Warriors	Away	Zions Bank Stadium	Won, 64–31
April 7	New Orleans Gold	Home	Alumni Field	Lost, 31–35
April 21	Houston SaberCats	Home	Alumni Field	Won, 35–21
April 28	Seattle Seawolves	Home	Alumni Field	Won, 29–7
May 5	San Diego Legion	Home	Lamport Stadium	Won, 23–19
May 9	Austin Elite	Home	Alumni Field	Won, 24–13
May 12	Utah Warriors	Home	Lamport Stadium	Won, 28–21
May 26	Glendale Raptors	Home	Lamport Stadium	Won, 40–12
June 2	Rugby United New York	Home	Lamport Stadium	Won, 22–20

=== Postseason ===
Date	Opponent	Home/Away	Location	Result
June 9	Seattle Seawolves	Away	Starfire Sports	Loss, 17–30

== 2020 season ==
On March 12, 2020, MLR announced the season would go on hiatus immediately for 30 days due to the COVID-19 pandemic. On March 19, 2020, MLR announced that they had cancelled the season and all remaining games for 2020.

=== Regular season ===
Date	Opponent	Home/Away	Location	Result
February 9	Austin Gilgronis	Away	Circuit of the Americas	Won, 38–10
February 16	Houston SaberCats	Neutral	Sam Boyd Stadium	Won, 27–22
February 22	Seattle Seawolves	Away	Starfire Sports Complex	Won, 39–17
March 1	Rugby ATL	Away	Life University Running Eagles Stadium	Won, 28–18
March 6	Colorado Raptors	Away	Infinity Park	Lost, 19–22
March 22	Rugby United New York	Away	MCU Park	Cancelled
March 28	New Orleans Gold	Away	Gold Mine	Cancelled
April 4	Utah Warriors	Home	York Alumni Stadium	Cancelled
April 11	New England Free Jacks	Home	York Alumni Stadium	Cancelled
April 19	Rugby ATL	Home	Lamport Stadium	Cancelled
April 26	Old Glory DC	Away	Cardinal Stadium	Cancelled
May 1	New Orleans Gold	Home	Lamport Stadium	Cancelled
May 10	San Diego Legion	Home	Lamport Stadium	Cancelled
May 18	New England Free Jacks	Away	Union Point Sports Complex	Cancelled
May 22	Rugby United New York	Home	Lamport Stadium	Cancelled
May 30	Old Glory DC	Home	Lamport Stadium	Cancelled

== 2021 season ==
Due to the Canadian federal government closing the border between the USA and Canada in response to the COVID-19 pandemic, Toronto relocated to Marietta, Georgia for the 2021 season. Although intended to be for the start of the season, the ongoing pandemic meant that all of the Arrow's “home” games were played at Lupo Family Field, sharing the ground with Rugby ATL for the season.

=== Regular season ===
Date	Opponent	Home/Away	Result
March 20	Rugby ATL	Away	Lost, 14–21
March 27	Utah Warriors	Away	Lost, 24–39
April 3	Old Glory DC	Away	Won, 40–19
April 10	LA Giltinis	Home	Lost, 16–43
April 17	Seattle Seawolves	Home	Won, 52–7
April 25	Rugby United New York	Away	Won, 53–12
May 2	New Orleans Gold	Away	Lost, 14–22
May 9	Rugby ATL	Home	Lost, 29–33
May 15	Houston SaberCats	Away	Won, 19–10
May 29	New England Free Jacks	Away	Lost, 12–14
June 6	San Diego Legion	Home	Lost, 30–40
June 12	Austin Gilgronis	Away	Lost, 47–21
June 20	New Orleans Gold	Home	Lost, 12–18
June 27	Rugby United New York	Home	Lost, 24–31
July 4	Old Glory DC	Home	Won, 34–28
July 11	New England Free Jacks	Home	Lost, 17–28

== 2022 season ==
=== Regular season ===
Date	Opponent	Home/Away	Result
February 6	Seattle Seawolves	Away	Lost, 8–21
February 11	LA Giltinis	Home	Lost, 16–31
February 19	New Orleans Gold	Away	Won, 24–23
February 26	Old Glory DC	Away	Won, 29–5
March 12	New England Free Jacks	Away	Lost, 15–21
March 19	Utah Warriors	Away	Won, 27–24
March 27	Rugby United NY	Away	Won, 14–10
April 2	Rugby ATL	Home	Lost, 14–20
April 9	Old Glory DC	Home	Won, 32–27
April 16	New Orleans Gold	Home	Won, 53–36
April 23	Houston SaberCats	Away	Lost, 17–29
May 8	Rugby United NY	Home	Lost, 17–41
May 14	Dallas Jackals	Home	Won, 57–0
May 19	New England Free Jacks	Home	Won, 33–18
May 28	Rugby ATL	Away	Lost, 23–34
June 5	Old Glory DC	Home	Lost, 35–50

== 2023 season ==
=== Regular season ===
Date	Opponent	Home/Away	Location	Result
February 17	Rugby ATL	Away	Silverbacks Park	Lost, 17–10
February 26	Rugby New York	Away	Mount Vernon Memorial Stadium	Lost, 39–3
March 11	Chicago Hounds	Away	SeatGeek Stadium	Won, 27–26
March 18	Old Glory DC	Away	Segra Field	Lost, 29–3
March 25	Utah Warriors	Away	Zions Bank Stadium	Lost, 47–19
April 1	Dallas Jackals	Away	Choctaw Stadium	Lost, 14–11
April 8	Rugby New York	Home	York Lions Stadium	Lost, 29–27
April 15	New England Free Jacks	Home	York Lions Stadium	Lost, 80–5
April 23	Seattle Seawolves	Home	York Lions Stadium	Lost, 36–27
April 30	New Orleans Gold	Away	The Gold Mine	Lost, 40–24
May 12	Rugby ATL	Home	York Lions Stadium	Draw, 34–34
May 18	Old Glory DC	Home	York Lions Stadium	Draw, 29–29
May 27	New England Free Jacks	Away	Veterans Memorial Stadium	Lost, 57–20
June 3	Houston SaberCats	Home	York Lions Stadium	Lost, 48–26
June 11	San Diego Legion	Home	York Lions Stadium	Lost, 50–17
June 17	New Orleans Gold	Home	York Lions Stadium	Lost, 26–24
