= List of 2019–20 Major League Rugby transfers =

This is a list of player transfers involving Major League Rugby teams that occurred from the end of the 2019 season and through the 2020 season. The league confirmed the additions of three teams for the 2020 season, New England Free Jacks, Old Glory DC, and Rugby ATL.

== Rugby ATL ==
Players in

- (United States) Harley Davidson from (United States) Glendale Raptors
- (Canada) Matt Heaton from (England) Darlington Mowden Park RFC
- (Canada) Conor Keys from (England) Rotherham Titans
- (United States) Jeremy Misailegalu from (United States) Utah Warriors
- (United States) Jason Damm from (United States) Glendale Raptors
- (United States) Ross Deacon from (United States) Rugby United New York
- (United States) Chance Wenglewski from (United States) Rugby United New York
- (United States) Alex Maughan from (United States) New Orleans Gold
- (United States) Eamonn Matthews from (United States) St. Bonaventure University

Players out

== Austin Gilgronis ==
Players in

- (Tonga) Daniel Faleafa from (England) Coventry
- (United States) Roland Suniula from (United States) Seattle Seawolves
- (New Zealand) Frank Halai from (France) Pau
- (Samoa) Potu Leavasa from (Australia) Warringah
- (Fiji) Enele Malele from (Fiji) Fijian Drua
- (United States) Corey Jones from (United States) Old Glory DC/USA Sevens
- (South Africa) Sebastian de Chaves from (England) London Irish

Players out

- (South Africa) Kyle Breytenbach to (United States) Houston SaberCats
- (Canada) Josh Larsen to (United States) New England Free Jacks
- (Canada) Travis Larsen to (United States) Old Glory DC
- (United States) Peter Malcolm to (United States) San Diego Legion
- (Ireland) Ben Mitchell to (United States) San Diego Legion
- (United States) Andrew Suniula retired
- (Morocco) Soheyl Jaoudat to (France) CS Beaune
- (France) Simon Courcoul to (United States) New England Free Jacks
- (France) Timothée Guillimin to (United States) New England Free Jacks
- (Canada) Doug Fraser to (United States) Old Glory DC
- (Uruguay) Andrés Vilaseca to (Uruguay) Peñarol Rugby
- (South Africa) Dylan Pieterse to (South Africa) Leopards/ (United States) Old Glory DC

== Colorado Raptors ==
Players in

- (United States) Nick Boyer from (United States) San Diego Legion
- (New Zealand) Michael Curry from (New Zealand) Tasman
- (New Zealand) Mason Emerson from (New Zealand) Hawke's Bay Magpies
- (United States) Jacob Finau from (United States) Life University West
- (Australia) Digby Ioane from (Japan) Panasonic Wild Knights
- (United States) Ryan James promoted from Academy
- (Ireland) Tomas Quinlan from (France) RC Narbonne
- (New Zealand) Rene Ranger from (France) La Rochelle
- (United States) Aladdin Schirmer from (United States) Seattle Seawolves
- (New Zealand) Samuel Slade from (New Zealand) Counties Manukau
- (New Zealand) Michael Stewart from (New Zealand) Rugby Southland
- (France) Xendy Tatibouet from (France) Etang Sale RC
- (Samoa) Sakaria Taulafo from (France) Céret sportif
- (Scotland) Sean Yacoubian from (United States) St. Mary's University

Players out

- (United States) Peter Dahl retired
- (United States) Harley Davidson to (United States) Rugby ATL
- (United States) Maximo De Achaval retired
- (United States) Zach Fenoglio retired
- (United States) Casey Rock retired
- (Australia) Dylan Taikato-Simpson to (United States) Old Glory DC
- (United States) Shaun Davies to (United States) Utah Warriors (as coach)
- (United States) Will Magie to (England) London Scottish
- (United States) Malon Al-Jiboori released
- (Canada) Noah Barker released
- (New Zealand) Murphy Taramai to (New Zealand) Hurricanes
- (United States) Jason Damm to (United States) Rugby ATL

== Old Glory DC ==
Players in

- (United States) Ryan Burroughs from (United States) Northern Virginia Eagles
- (United States) Mika Dabulas from (United States) Penn State
- (United States) Jamason Faʻanana-Schultz from (United States) Houston Sabercats
- (Canada) Doug Fraser from (United States) Austin Herd
- (New Zealand) Gordon Fullerton from (New Zealand) Waikato
- (Canada) Travis Larsen from (United States) Austin Elite
- (United States) Jack McLean from (United States) Penn State
- (Fiji) Api Naikatini from (United States) Seattle Seawolves
- (Fiji) Tevita Naqali from (Fiji) Fijian Latui
- (New Zealand) Jason Robertson from (New Zealand) Bay of Plenty
- (New Zealand) Dylan Taikato-Simpson from (United States) Glendale Raptors
- (United States) Jake Turnbull from (United States) Houston Sabercats
- (Samoa) Danny Tusitala from (New Zealand) Auckland
- (South Africa) Tendai Mtawarira from (South Africa) Sharks

Players out

- (United States) Cullen Barelka to (United States) 404 Rugby
- (United States) Corey Jones to (United States) Austin Herd

== Houston SaberCats ==
Players in

- (United States) Jake Christmann from Utah Warriors
- (South Africa) Kyle Breytenbach from (United States) Austin Herd
- (New Zealand) Tim Cadwallader from (New Zealand) Manawatu
- (Argentina) Matías Freyre from (Argentina) Club Newman
- (England) Zack Godfrey from (England) Leicester Tigers
- (United States) Taylor Howden from (United States) New Orleans Gold
- (South Africa) Tiaan Loots from (Wales) Dragons
- (Australia) De Wet Roos from (Australia) NSW Country Eagles
- (New Zealand) Boyd Wiggins from (New Zealand) Northland
- (United States) Zachary Short from (New Zealand) Greerton Marist
- (Argentina) Nicolás Solveyra from (Argentina) Jaguares XV
- (Argentina) Diego Fortuny from (Argentina) Jaguares

Players out

- (Uruguay) Mateo Sanguinetti to (Uruguay) Peñarol Rugby
- (Uruguay) Santiago Arata to (Uruguay) Peñarol Rugby
- (Uruguay) Alejandro Nieto to (Uruguay) Peñarol Rugby (player-coach)
- (Fiji) Josua Vici to (France) US Colomiers
- (United States) Jamason Faʻanana-Schultz to (United States) Old Glory DC
- (United States) Jake Turnbull to (United States) Old Glory DC
- (United States) Paul Mullen
- (United States) Pat O'Toole
- (United States) Deion Mikesell
- (United States) Matt Trouville retired
- (England) Connor Murphy retired
- (Ireland) Jason Harris-Wright retired
- (United States) Chris Saint released
- (England) Jack Riley released

== New England Free Jacks ==
Players in

- (New Zealand) Sam Beard from (New Zealand) Crusaders
- (Fiji) Isaac Cavu from (Australia) GPS
- (France) Simon Courcoul from (United States) Austin Herd
- (Fiji) Naulia Dawai from (Singapore) Asia Pacific Dragons
- (Tonga) Tolu Fahamokioa from (New Zealand) Hawke's Bay
- (France) Timothée Guillimin from (United States) Austin Herd
- (Japan) Kensuke Hatakeyama from (Japan) Suntory Sungoliath
- (New Zealand) Brad Hemopo from (Australia) Manly
- (Canada) Josh Larsen from (United States) Austin Herd
- (Ireland) John Poland from (Ireland) UCC
- (New Zealand) Liam Steel from (New Zealand) Bay of Plenty
- (New Zealand) Beaudein Waaka from (Australia) Manly
- (Fiji) Poasa Waqanibau from (Fiji) Fijian Drua
- (United States) Mitch Wilson from (United States) Life University

Players out

- (South Africa) Dolph Botha to (South Africa) Griffons

== New Orleans Gold ==
Players in

- (Australia) Robbie Coleman from (Australia) Gordon
- (South Africa) Cullen Collopy from (South Africa) Sharks
- (South Africa) Carl Meyer from (Wales) Ebbw Vale
- (United States) Jonathan Poole from (United States) Life University
- (United States) Dino Waldren from (United States) San Diego Legion

Players out

- (United States) Michael Baska to (United States) Utah Warriors
- (United States) Taylor Howden to (United States) Houston SaberCats
- (United States) Caleb Meyer to (United States) Utah Warriors
- (Wales) Ross Davies to (Wales) Pontypridd RFC
- (Canada) Hubert Buydens retired
- (United States) Zach Stryffeler released
- (South Africa) Vince Jobo released
- (United States) Mason Briant released
- (United States) Kavika Peniata released

== Rugby United New York ==
- (Colombia) Julio Cesar Giraldo from (United States) Old Blue
- (France) Mathieu Bastareaud from (France) Toulon
- (Ireland) Cormac Daly from (Ireland) Connacht Eagles
- (Ireland) Jason Higgins from (Ireland) Cork Constitution
- (United States) Rob Irimescu from (United States) NYAC
- (Argentina) JP Aguirre from (United States) Austin Herd

Players out

- (United States) Seamus Kelly released
- (United States) Chris Sullivan retired
- (United States) Ross Deacon to (United States) Rugby ATL

== San Diego Legion ==
Players in

- (United States) Paul Mullen from (United States) Houston SaberCats
- (Australia) Luke Burton from (France) Biarritz
- (New Zealand) Chris Eves from (New Zealand) Hurricanes
- (United States) Peter Malcolm from (United States) Austin Herd
- (Ireland) Ben Mitchell from (United States) Austin Herd
- (United States) Devereaux Ferris from (United States) Life West
- (New Zealand) Ma'a Nonu from (New Zealand) Blues

Players out

- (United States) Nick Boyer to (United States) Colorado Raptors
- (United States) Kapeli Pifeleti to (England) Saracens
- (Australia) Paddy Ryan to (Japan) Munakata Sanix Blues
- (United States) Dino Waldren to (United States) New Orleans Gold
- (New Zealand) Jordan Manihera released

== Seattle Seawolves ==
Players in

- (Wales) Harry Davies from (England) Bedford Blues
- (South Africa) Ryno Eksteen from (South Africa) Cheetahs
- (Australia) Tim Metcher from (New Zealand) Counties Manukau
- (South Africa) FP Pelser from (South Africa) Griquas
- (Ireland) David Busby from (Ireland) Ulster
- (England) Ross Neal from (England) Wasps

Players out

- (Fiji) Api Naikatini to (United States) Old Glory DC
- (Canada) Cam Polson released
- (United States) Aladdin Schirmer to (United States) Colorado Raptors
- (United States) Roland Suniula to (United States) Austin Herd
- (United States) Peter Tiberio retired
- (England) Ross Neal to (England) London Irish (short-term contract)

== Toronto Arrows ==
Players in

- (New Zealand) Tayler Adams from (New Zealand) Southland
- (Australia) Richie Asiata from (Australia) Queensland Country
- (Argentina) Tomás de la Vega from (Argentina) CUBA
- (Uruguay) Manuel Diana from (Uruguay) Old Christians
- (Canada) Will Kelly from (Wales) Dragons
- (Canada) Ben LeSage from (Canada) UBC Thunderbirds
- (Canada) Tyler Rowland from (Canada) UBC Thunderbirds

Players out

- (New Zealand) Morgan Mitchell to (Japan) Kamaishi Seawaves

== Utah Warriors ==
Players in

- (United States) Michael Baska from (United States) New Orleans Gold
- (United States) Caleb Meyer from (United States) New Orleans Gold
- (United States) Michael Payne from (United States) Brigham Young University
- (Samoa) Dwayne Polataivao from (England) Doncaster Knights
- (Fiji) Maikeli Naromaitoga from (United States) Austin Herd
- (Germany) Hagen Schulte from (Germany) Heidelberger RK
- (Australia) Richard Stanford from (Australia) NSW Country Eagles
- (South Africa) Jurie van Vuuren from (South Africa) Eastern Province Elephants
- (Fiji) Ratu Veremalua Vugakoto from (Fiji) Fijian Latui
- (Tonga) Ricky Tu'ihalangingie from Brigham Young University
- (New Zealand) Kalolo Tuiloma from (New Zealand) Counties Manukau/Highlanders
- (United States) Calvin Whiting from (United States) Brigham Young University
- (United States) Bailey Wilson from (United States) Utah Valley University

Players out

- (United States) Blake Burdette retired
- (United States) Jeremy Misailegalu to (United States) Rugby ATL
- (Brazil) Arthur Bergo to (Brazil) Corinthians Rugby
- (Brazil) Josh Reeves to (Brazil) Corinthians Rugby
- (New Zealand) Tim O'Malley to (Japan) NEC Green Rockets
- (New Zealand) Adam Thomson to (New Zealand) Otago
- (Tonga) Johnny Ika to (New Zealand) Hawkes Bay/ (Chile) Selknam
- (United States) Alex Vorster released
- (United States) Don Pati released
- (United States) Alex Tucci released
- (Australia) Jeremy Leber released
- (United States) Metai Tuimoala released
- (New Zealand) Logan Daniels released
- (United States) Vernon Ale released
- (Australia) Ian Luciano released
- (United States) Thomas Kacor released
- (United States) Jake Christmann to (United States) Houston SaberCats
- (United States) Les Soloai released
- (Fiji) Vilame Vuli released
- (New Zealand) James Semple released
- (New Zealand) Simon Quickfall released
- (United States) Iniki Fa'amausili released
- (United States) AJ Tu'ineau released
- (United States) Jake Anderson released

== See also ==
- List of 2018–19 Major League Rugby transfers
- List of 2020–21 Major League Rugby transfers
- List of 2019–20 Premiership Rugby transfers
- List of 2019–20 RFU Championship transfers
- List of 2019–20 Super Rugby transfers
- List of 2019–20 Pro14 transfers
- List of 2019–20 Top 14 transfers
