= 2018 Major League Rugby season =

Inaugural season of Major League Rugby

2018 Major League Rugby
- Date: April 21 – July 7
- Champions: Seattle Seawolves (1st title)
- Runners-up: Glendale Raptors
- Matches played: 31
- Top point scorer: Sam Windsor (103)
- Top try scorer: Tonata Lauti (9)

Official website
- www.usmlr.com

The 2018 Major League Rugby season was the inaugural season of Major League Rugby, an annual rugby union competition sanctioned by USA Rugby. The seven inaugural teams were based in the United States. The competition began the weekend of April 21–22 with three matches, with New Orleans defeating Houston 35–26 to open the season.

Glendale and Seattle were the best two teams at the end of the regular season and won their respective semi-final matches to advance to the championship game at Torero Stadium in San Diego. Seattle became Major League Rugby's first champion team with a surprise come-from-behind 23–19 win in the final over Glendale, who had only lost once previously during the season.

== Teams ==
Team	Head coach	Captain	Stadium	Capacity
Austin Elite	(France) Alain Hyardet	(United States) Andrew Suniula	Multipurpose Complex	3,500
Glendale Raptors	(United States) David Williams	(United States) Shaun Davies	Infinity Park	5,000
Houston SaberCats	(Ireland) Justin Fitzpatrick	(United States) Kyle Sumsion	Dyer Stadium	6,000
New Orleans Gold	(Australia) Nate Osborne	(New Zealand) Taylor Howden	Eagle Athletic Facility	3,000
San Diego Legion	(England) Rob Hoadley	(United States) Nate Augspurger	Torero Stadium	6,000
Seattle Seawolves	(Canada) Phil Mack	(United States) Shalom Suniula	Starfire Stadium	3,800
Utah Warriors	(New Zealand) Alf Daniels	(United States) Paul Lasike	Zions Bank Stadium	5,000

== Regular season ==
All seven participating teams played eight matches and received two rounds of byes during the regular season held over ten weeks from April through to June. The schedule was short of a full home and away draw by four match rounds, so each side played two of the other teams twice and four of them only once. The top four teams at the end of the regular season advanced to the MLR playoffs.

=== Standings ===
The final standings for the 2018 Major League Rugby regular season were:

Pos	Team	Pld	W	D	L	PF	PA	PD	TB	LB	Pts	Qualification
1	Glendale Raptors (P)	8	7	0	1	249	165	+84	6	0	34	Semifinals
2	Seattle Seawolves (C)	8	6	0	2	232	188	+44	4	1	29	Semifinals
3	San Diego Legion	8	5	0	3	214	201	+13	3	1	24	Semifinals
4	Utah Warriors	8	3	0	5	269	274	−5	7	3	22	Semifinals
5	Austin Elite	8	3	0	5	224	238	−14	5	1	18	
6	New Orleans Gold	8	3	0	5	209	291	−82	4	1	17	
7	Houston SaberCats	8	1	0	7	216	256	−40	3	4	11	

Updated to match(es) played on June 23, 2018. Source: rugbyarchive.net Archived November 4, 2018, at the Wayback Machine
Rules for classification: Four points for a win, two for a draw, and no points for a bye. One bonus point for scoring four or more tries (TB). One bonus point for losing by seven or less (LB).

=== Matches ===
The following matches were played for the 2018 Major League Rugby regular season:

Home \ Away	AUS	GLE	HOU	NOLA	SAN	SEA	UTA
Austin Elite				30–17	31–5	19–20	41–33
Glendale Raptors	41–26		37–24		31–27	33–11	
Houston SaberCats	50–38			26–35		7–20	30–36
New Orleans Gold		10–47	24–20		22–39	29–31	
San Diego Legion	31–17	23–5	35–32				31–24
Seattle Seawolves		15–19		55–26	39–23		41–32
Utah Warriors	41–22	29–36	31–27	43–46			

Updated to match(es) played on June 23, 2018. Source:
Legend: Blue = home team win; Yellow = draw; Red = away team win.

==== Week 1 ====
April 21	Houston SaberCats	26–35	New Orleans Gold	Dyer Stadium, Houston, Texas
3:00 pm EDT (UTC−04)	Try: Osea Kolinisau 18' m Josua Vici (2) 25' c, 78' c Justin Allen 66' c Con: Windsor (3/4) 26', 67', 79'	Report	Try: Sebastián Kalm 33' c Nikola Bursic 44' m Matt Hughston 58' c JP Eloff 73' c Con: JP Eloff (3/4) 34', 59', 74'; Pen: JP Eloff (3/5) 21', 47', 80'	Referee: Paul-Henri Courbier (France)

April 21	Glendale Raptors	41–26	Austin Elite	Infinity Park, Glendale, Colorado
5:00 pm EDT (UTC−04)	Try: Connor Cook 33' c John Quill 37' c Ben Landry 40' c Maximo de Achaval 44' c Harley Davidson 47' c Con: Will Magie (5/5) 34', 38', 40', 45', 48'; Pen: Will Magie (2/3) 21', 80'	Report	Try: Reece Czarnecki (2) 14' c, 75' m Hanco Germishuys 52' c Ben Mitchell 59' c Con: Timothée Guillimin (3/4) 15', 53', 60'; Pen: Timothée Guillimin (0/1)	Referee: Chris Assmus (Canada)

April 22	Seattle Seawolves	39–23	San Diego Legion	Starfire Sports Complex, Tukwila, Washington
8:00 pm EDT (UTC−04)	Try: Brock Staller 21' c Penalty try (3) 36', 58', 68'; Cam Polson 75' m Con: Brock Staller (1/2) 22'; Pen: Brock Staller (2/3) 10', 32'	Report	Try: Chris Turori 64' c Drew Gaffney 72' c Con: Ben Cima (2/2) 65', 73'; Pen: Ben Cima (3/4) 5', 27', 43'	Attendance: 3,500; Referee: Derek Summers (United States)

Bye/s: Utah Warriors

==== Week 2 ====
April 28	Houston SaberCats	50–38	Austin Elite	Dyer Stadium, Houston, Texas
3:30 pm EDT (UTC−04)	Try: Connor Murphy 1' c Osea Kolinisau 10' c Lindsey Stevens 42' c Josua Vici 45' c Justin Allen 48' m Sam Windsor 61' c Joey Iosefa 67' c Con: Sam Windsor (6/7) 2', 11', 43', 46', 62', 68'; Pen: Sam Windsor (1/1) 22'	Report	Try: Sione Fangaiuiha (2) 26' m, 55' c Hanco Germishuys 38' m Andrew Suniula 57' c Alex Faison-Donahoe 71' c Knute O'Donnell 80' c Con: Timothée Guillimin (4/6) 56', 58', 72', 80'; Pen: Timothée Guillimin (0/1)	Referee: Derek Summers (United States)

April 28	Seattle Seawolves	15–19	Glendale Raptors	Starfire Sports Complex, Tukwila, Washington
10:30 pm EDT (UTC−04)	Try: Vili Tolutaʻu 58' c George Barton 80' m Con: Brock Staller (1/2) 59'; Pen: Brock Staller (1/1) 39'	Report	Try: Zach Fenoglio 36' m Harley Davidson 48' m Con: Will Magie (0/2); Pen: Will Magie (3/4) 9', 24', 71'	Referee: Scott Green (United States)

April 29	San Diego Legion	31–24	Utah Warriors	Torero Stadium, San Diego, California
7:00 pm EDT (UTC−04)	Try: Sione Tuihalamaka 1' c Anthony Purpura 10' m Devin Short 40' m Anthony Salaber 56' c Ryan Matyas 69' c Con: Tadhg Leader (2/4) 2', 57'; Dylan Audsley (1/1) 70'; Pen: Tadhg Leader (0/1)	Report	Try: Joseph Nicholls 28' c Saia Uhila 38' c Ben Nicholls 77' c Con: Kurt Morath (3/3) 29', 39', 78'; Pen: Kurt Morath (1/2) 65'	Attendance: 2,000; Referee: Paul-Henri Courbier (France)

Bye/s: New Orleans Gold

==== Week 3 ====
May 3	Austin Elite	30–17	New Orleans Gold	Multipurpose Complex, Round Rock, Texas
9:00 pm EDT (UTC−04)	Try: Ned Hodson (2) 16' m, 68' c Hanco Germishuys (2) 43' m, 65' c Con: Timothée Guillimin (2/4) 66', 69'; Pen: Timothée Guillimin (2/4) 2', 5'	Report	Try: John Sullivan (2) 29' c, 52' c Con: JP Eloff (2/2) 40', 53'; Pen: JP Eloff (1/1) 28'	Referee: Scott Green (United States)

May 4	San Diego Legion	35–32	Houston SaberCats	Torero Stadium, San Diego, California
8:30 pm EDT (UTC−04)	Try: Anthony Salaber (3) 17' c, 22' c, 34' c Pat Blair 51' c Anthony Purpura 80' c Con: Dylan Audsley (4/4) 18', 23', 35', 52'; Ben Cima (1/1) 80'	Report	Try: Osea Kolinisau 9' c Sam Windsor 31' c Con: Sam Windsor (2/2) 10', 32'; Pen: Sam Windsor (5/6) 11', 25', 44', 54', 67'; Drop: Osea Kolinisau 75'	Referee: Chris Assmus (Canada)

May 5	Utah Warriors	29–36	Glendale Raptors	Zions Bank Stadium, Herriman, Utah, Utah
3:30 pm EDT (UTC−04)	Try: Angus MacLellan 30' c Fetuʻu Vainikolo 46' c Tonata Lauti (2) 68' m, 70' c Con: Kurt Morath (3/4) 31', 47', 71'; Pen: Kurt Morath (1/2) 27'	Report	Try: Sam Figg 23' c Harley Davidson 52' c Peter Dahl 65' c Bryce Campbell 72' c Mika Kruse 75' m Con: Will Magie (4/5) 24', 53', 66', 73'; Pen: Will Magie (1/1) 19'	Referee: Derek Summers (United States)

Bye/s: Seattle Seawolves

==== Week 4 ====
May 11	Utah Warriors	41–22	Austin Elite	Zions Bank Stadium, Herriman, Utah
9:00 pm EDT (UTC−04)	Try: Jared Whippy 19' c Paul Lasike 24' m Josh Anderson 39' c Fetuʻu Vainikolo 60' m Maika Hafoka 74' c Joseph Nicholls 77' c Con: Kurt Morath (4/6) 20', 40', 75', 78'; Pen: Kurt Morath (1/1) 13'	Report	Try: Marcus Walsh (2) 30' c, 71' c Hanco Germishuys 46' m Con: Timothée Guillimin (2/3) 31', 72'; Pen: Timothée Guillimin (1/1) 64'	Referee: Scott Green (United States)

May 12	New Orleans Gold	29–31	Seattle Seawolves	Eagle Athletic Facility, Marrero, Louisiana
1:00 pm EDT (UTC−04)	Try: Peceli Rinakama 13' m Joeli Tikoisuva 28' c Hubert Buydens 30' m Taylor Howden 63' c Matt Hughston 74' c Con: Taylor Howden (2/3) 29', 63'; Michael Baska (1/2) 74'; Pen: Taylor Howden (0/1)	Report	Try: Will Holder 31' c William Rasileka 44' c Peter Tiberio 57' c Mathew Turner 68' c Con: Peter Smith (4/4) 32', 45', 57', 69'; Pen: Peter Smith (1/1) 25'	Referee: Paul-Henri Courbier (France)

May 13	Glendale Raptors	31–27	San Diego Legion	Infinity Park, Glendale, Colorado
8:00 pm EDT (UTC−04)	Try: Maximo de Achaval 18' c Kelepi Fifita 49' c Seth Halliman 61' c Zach Fenoglio 76' c Con: Will Magie (4/4) 19', 50', 62', 77'; Pen: Will Magie (1/1) 11'	Report	Try: Sione Tuihalamaka 14' c Pat Blair 39' c Dolph Botha 46' c Con: Dylan Audsley (3/3) 15', 40', 47'; Pen: Dylan Audsley (2/3) 66', 73'	Referee: Adam Leal (England)

Bye/s: Houston SaberCats

==== Week 5 ====
May 19	New Orleans Gold	24–20	Houston SaberCats	Eagle Athletic Facility, Marrero, Louisiana
4:00 pm EDT (UTC−04)	Try: Zack Stryffeler 27' c Penalty try 34'; Peceli Rinakama 38' c Con: Taylor Howden (3/3) 28', 35', 39'; Pen: Taylor Howden (1/2) 73'	Report	Try: Sam Windsor 4' c Connor Murphy 40' c Con: Sam Windsor (2/2) 5', 40'; Pen: Sam Windsor (2/2) 32', 76'	Referee: Adam Leal (England)

May 20	Seattle Seawolves	41–32	Utah Warriors	Starfire Sports Complex, Tukwila, Washington
8:30 pm EDT (UTC−04)	Try: William Rasileka 11' c Mathew Turner 13' c Vili Tolutaʻu (2) 31' c, 62' c Phil Mack 58' c Con: Peter Smith (3/3) 12', 14', 32'; Brock Staller (2/2) 59', 63'; Pen: Peter Smith (1/1) 30'; Brock Staller (1/1) 39'	Report	Try: Lote Tuipulotu (2) 2' m, 18' m Tonata Lauti 36' c Ara Elkington 66' m Paki Afu 78' c Con: Kurt Morath (2/5) 37', 79'; Pen: Kurt Morath (1/1) 9'	Referee: Luke Rogan (Australia)

Bye/s: Austin Elite, Glendale Raptors. San Diego Legion

==== Week 6 ====
May 25	Austin Elite	31–5	San Diego Legion	Multipurpose Complex, Round Rock, Texas
9:00 pm EDT (UTC−04)	Try: Siaosi Finau 14' c Hanco Germishuys 19' c Zinzan Elan-Puttick 45' c Marcus Walsh 70' c Con: Timothée Guillimin (4/4) 15', 20', 46', 71'; Pen: Timothée Guillimin (1/2) 8'	Report	Try: Drew Gaffney 61' m Con: Dylan Audsley (0/1)	Referee: Josh Houston (United States)

May 26	Houston SaberCats	30–36	Utah Warriors	Dyer Stadium, Houston, Texas
6:00 pm EDT (UTC−04)	Try: Osea Kolinisau 5' c Josua Vici 18' c Connor Murphy 62' c Con: Sam Windsor (3/3) 6', 19', 63'; Pen: Sam Windsor (3/3) 2', 22', 46'	Report	Try: Matt Jensen 9' c Lance Williams 13' c Don Pati 43' c Tonata Lauti 48' m Lote Tuipulotu 69' c Con: Kurt Morath (4/5) 10', 14', 44', 70'; Pen: Kurt Morath (1/1) 37'	Referee: Scott Green (United States)

May 27	Seattle Seawolves	55–26	New Orleans Gold	Starfire Sports Complex, Tukwila, Washington
8:00 pm EDT (UTC−04)	Try: Brock Staller (2) 5' c, 21' c Eric Duechle 10' c Mathew Turner (2) 21' c, 78' c Aladdin Schirmer 54' c Dan Trierweiler 68' c Con: Brock Staller (6/6) 6', 11', 22', 69', 79'; Will Holder (1/1) 55'	Report	Try: Ben Tarr 16' c Penalty try 37'; Moni Tonga’uiha 39' c Michael Baska 43' m Con: Taylor Howden (2/3) 17', 40'; Pen: Taylor Howden (0/1)	Referee: Chris Assmus (Canada)

Bye/s: Glendale Raptors

==== Week 7 ====
June 1	Austin Elite	41–33	Utah Warriors	Multipurpose Complex, Round Rock, Texas
9:00 pm EDT (UTC−04)	Try: Alex Faison-Donahoe 5' m Zinzan Elan-Puttick (2) 17' m, 41' c Pedrie Wannenburg 34' c Marcus Walsh 43' m Con: Timothée Guillimin (2/5) 35', 42'; Pen: Timothée Guillimin (4/5) 11', 67', 70', 75'	Report	Try: Tonata Lauti 12' m AJ Tu'ineau 29' c David Tameilau 64' c Ray Forrester 71' c Iniki Fa'amausili 76' c Con: Johnny Linehan (2/3) 30', 65'; Ben Nicholls (2/2) 72', 76'; Pen: Johnny Linehan (0/1)	Referee: Adam Leal (England)

June 2	Houston SaberCats	7–20	Seattle Seawolves	Dyer Stadium, Houston, Texas
9:00 pm EDT (UTC−04)	Try: Charlie Hewitt 62' c Con: Sam Windsor (1/1) 63'	Report	Try: Peter Tiberio 44' c Phil Mack 52' c Con: Brock Staller (2/2) 45', 53'; Pen: Brock Staller (2/4) 26', 40'	Referee: Derek Summers (United States)

June 3	New Orleans Gold	10–47	Glendale Raptors	Eagle Athletic Facility, Marrero, Louisiana
4:00 pm EDT (UTC−04)	Try: Joey Sok 27' m Cameron Troxler 67' m Con: JP Eloff (0/1); Taylor Howden (0/1)	Report	Try: Bryce Campbell (2) 4' c, 80' c Mika Kruse 11' c John Quill 19' m Will Magie 47' c Zach Fenoglio 61' c Sam Figg 77' c Con: Will Magie (6/7) 5', 12', 48', 62', 78', 80'	Referee: Chris Assmus (Canada)

Bye/s: San Diego Legion

==== Week 8 ====
June 8	Austin Elite	19–20	Seattle Seawolves	Multipurpose Complex, Round Rock, Texas
9:00 pm EDT (UTC−04)	Try: Ross Deacon 18' c Con: Timothée Guillimin (1/1) 19'; Pen: Timothée Guillimin (4/4) 5', 11', 69'	Report	Try: William Rasileka 21' m Sequoyah Burke-Combs 46' m Taylor Krumrei 62' c Con: Will Holder (1/3) 63'; Pen: Will Holder (1/2) 36'	Referee: Scott Green (United States)

June 8	Glendale Raptors	37–24	Houston SaberCats	Infinity Park, Glendale, Colorado
9:00 pm EDT (UTC−04)	Try: Harley Davidson (3) 6' c, 11' m, 46' c Dylan Fawsitt 25' m Maximo de Achaval 58' c Con: Maximo de Achaval (3/5) 7', 47', 59'; Pen: Maximo de Achaval (1/2) 71'	Report	Try: Josua Vici 38' c Matt Trouville 55' m Alex Elkins 65' c, 73' m Con: Sam Windsor (2/4) 39', 66'; Pen: Sam Windsor (0/1)	Referee: Chris Assmus (Canada)

June 9	New Orleans Gold	22–39	San Diego Legion	Eagle Athletic Facility, Marrero, Louisiana
5:00 pm EDT (UTC−04)	Try: Tim Maupin 5' c Cameron Troxler 49' c JP Eloff 61' m Con: JP Eloff (2/3) 6', 50'; Pen: JP Eloff (1/1) 33'	Report	Try: Pat Blair 9' m Ryan Matyas 23' c Anthony Salaber 40' c Nick Evans 42' m Taku Ngwenya 54' c Nathan Sylvia 67' m Con: Tadhg Leader (3/6) 24', 40', 55'; Pen: Tadhg Leader (1/1) 21'	Referee: Paul-Henri Courbier (United States)

Bye/s: Utah Warriors

==== Week 9 ====
June 16	Utah Warriors	43–46	New Orleans Gold	Zions Bank Stadium, Herriman, Utah
4:00 pm EDT (UTC−04)	Try: Don Pati (2) 5' m, 8' c Tonata Lauti 36' c Jonny Linehan 40' c Josh Anderson 57' m Fetuʻu Vainikolo 65' c Ray Forrester 78' m Con: Jonny Linehan (4/7) 9', 37', 40', 66'	Report	Try: Matt Hughston 18' m Tim Maupin 30' c Jojo Tikoisuva 42' c JP Eloff 44' c Cameron Troxler 50' m Con: JP Eloff (3/5) 31', 43', 45'; Pen: JP Eloff (4/4) 26', 39', 56', 62'	Referee: Derek Summers (United States)

June 16	Glendale Raptors	33–11	Seattle Seawolves	Infinity Park, Glendale, Colorado, Colorado
9:00 pm EDT (UTC−04)	Try: Chad London (2) 35' c, 49' c Zach Fenoglio 39' c Mika Kruse 44' m Connor Cook 52' c Con: Maximo de Achaval (4/5) 36', 40', 50', 53'	Report	Try: Mozac Samson 10' m Con: Will Holder (0/1); Pen: Will Holder (1/1) 16'; Drop: Will Holder (1/1) 30'	Referee: Adam Leal (England)

June 17	San Diego Legion	31–17	Austin Elite	Torero Stadium, San Diego, California
8:00 pm EDT (UTC−04)	Try: Nick Boyer 15' c Nathan Sylvia 39' m Ryan Matyas 77' m Con: Tadhg Leader (2/3) 16', 78'; Pen: Tadhg Leader (4/4) 4', 24', 46', 55	Report	Try: Junior Naruma 48' c Sani Taylor 71' c Con: Timothée Guillimin (2/2) 49', 72'; Pen: Timothée Guillimin (1/1) 10'	Attendance: 3,000; Referee: Paul-Henri Courbier (United States)

Bye/s: Houston SaberCats

==== Week 10 ====
June 23	Utah Warriors	31–27	Houston SaberCats	Zions Bank Stadium, Herriman, Utah
4:00 pm EDT (UTC−04)	Try: Tonata Lauti (2) 10' c, 72' m Saia Uhila 31' m Ara Elkington 49' c Alex Tucci 68' c Con: Jonny Linehan (2/3) 11', 50'; Ben Nicholls (1/2) 69'	Report	Try: Cecil Garber 16' c Sam Windsor 40' c Osea Kolinisau 64' c Con: Sam Windsor (3/3) 17', 40', 65'; Pen: Sam Windsor (2/4) 25', 60'	Referee: Adam Leal (England)

June 23	San Diego Legion	23–5	Glendale Raptors	Torero Stadium, San Diego, California
10:30 pm EDT (UTC−04)	Try: Ryan Matyas 48’ c Tony Lamborn 58’ c Con: Tadhg Leader (2/2) 49’, 59’ Pen: Tadhg Leader (3/4) 3’, 20’, 72’	Report	Try: Grigor Kerdikoshvili 78’ m Con: Maximo de Achaval (0/1)	Referee: Scott Green (United States)

Bye/s: Austin Elite, New Orleans Gold, Seattle Seawolves

== Playoffs ==
The top four teams from the regular season qualified for the playoffs. The format was two semifinal matches – first versus fourth, and second versus third – followed by a Championship game between the semifinal winners to determine the MLR champion team.

The semifinals were played as a double header at Infinity Park in Glendale on June 30, followed a week later by the final at Torero Stadium in San Diego on July 7.

=== Bracket ===
Semi-Finals
1	Glendale Raptors	34
4	Utah Warriors	21
2	Seattle Seawolves	38
3	San Diego Legion	24

Finals
1	Glendale Raptors	19
2	Seattle Seawolves	23

=== Semifinals ===
June 30	Seattle Seawolves	38–24	San Diego Legion	Infinity Park, Glendale, Colorado
7:00 pm EDT (UTC−04)	Try: Shalom Suniula 33' c William Rasileka 63' c, Peter Tiberio 65' c Sequoyah Burke-Combs 73' c John Hayden 78' c Con: Peter Smith (5/5) 34', 63', 66', 74', 79'; Pen: Peter Smith (1/1) 6'	Report	Try: Joe Pietersen 9' c Drew Gaffney 56' c Nate Augspurger 80' c Con: Joe Pietersen (3/3) 10', 57', 80'; Pen: Joe Pietersen (1/1) 3'; Cards: Alec Barton 61' YC; Siaosi Mahoni 67' YC	Attendance: 3,287; Referee: Derek Summers (United States)

June 30	Glendale Raptors	34–21	Utah Warriors	Infinity Park, Glendale, Colorado
9:30 pm EDT (UTC−04)	Try: Sam Figg 2' c Harley Davidson 28' c, Shaun Davies 31' m Zach Fenoglio 52' c, Luke White 64' m Con: Will Magie (3/5) 3', 29', 53'; Pen: Will Magie (1/1) 13'	Report	Try: Tonata Lauti 35' c David Tameilau 68' c Don Pati 73' c Con: Kurt Morath (1/1) 36'; Joseph Nicholls (2/2) 69', 73'	Attendance: 3,407; Referee: Adam Leal (England)

=== Final ===
July 7	Glendale Raptors	19–23	Seattle Seawolves	Torero Stadium, San Diego, California
9:00 pm EDT (UTC−04)	Try: Zach Fenoglio (2) 13' c, 50' m Bryce Campbell 56' c Con: Will Magie (2/3) 13', 57'	Report	Try: Ray Barkwill 23' m William Rasileka 58' m, Riekert Hattingh 61' c Con: Peter Smith (1/3) 62'; Pen: Peter Smith (2/3) 9', 67'	Attendance: 2,901; Referee: Scott Green (United States)

== Team statistics ==
=== Points by week ===
Week Team	1		2		3		4		5		6		7		8		9		10		Total		Average	
Austin	26	41	38	50	30	17	22	41	–	–	31	5	41	33	19	20	17	31	–	–	224	238	28.0	29.8
Glendale	41	26	19	15	36	29	31	27	–	–	–	–	47	10	37	24	33	11	5	23	249	165	31.1	20.6
Houston	26	35	50	38	32	35	–	–	20	24	30	36	7	20	24	37	–	–	27	31	216	256	27.0	32.0
New Orleans	35	26	–	–	17	30	29	31	24	20	26	55	10	47	22	39	46	43	–	–	209	291	26.1	36.4
San Diego	23	39	31	24	35	32	27	31	–	–	5	31	–	–	39	22	31	17	23	5	214	201	26.8	25.1
Seattle	39	23	15	19	–	–	31	29	41	32	55	26	20	7	20	19	11	33	–	–	232	188	29.0	23.5
Utah	–	–	24	31	29	36	41	22	32	41	36	30	33	41	–	–	43	46	31	27	269	274	33.6	34.3

=== Tries by week ===
Week Team	1		2		3		4		5		6		7		8		9		10		Total		Average	
Austin	4	5	6	7	4	2	3	6	–	–	4	1	5	5	1	3	2	3	–	–	29	32	3.6	4.0
Glendale	5	4	2	2	5	4	4	3	–	–	–	–	7	2	5	4	5	1	1	2	34	22	4.3	2.8
Houston	4	4	7	6	2	5	–	–	2	3	3	5	1	2	4	5	–	–	3	5	26	35	3.3	4.4
New Orleans	4	4	–	–	2	4	5	4	3	2	4	7	2	7	3	6	5	7	–	–	28	41	3.5	5.1
San Diego	2	5	5	3	5	2	3	4	–	–	1	4	–	–	6	3	3	2	2	1	27	24	3.4	3.0
Seattle	5	2	2	2	–	–	4	5	5	5	7	4	2	1	3	1	1	5	–	–	29	25	3.6	3.1
Utah	–	–	3	5	4	5	6	3	5	5	5	3	5	5	–	–	7	5	5	3	40	34	5.0	4.3

Attack	Defense

== Player statistics ==
The leading scorers in 2018 over the regular season and playoffs combined were:

=== Leading try scorers ===
No.	Player	Team	Tries excl. playoffs	Total tries
1	Tonata Lauti	Utah Warriors	8	9
2	Harley Davidson	Glendale Raptors	6	7
2	Zach Fenoglio	Glendale Raptors	4	7 (Note: In a discrepancy between sources, Zach Fenoglio's second try in the MLR championship game, as recorded by Americas Rugby News, was attributed instead to Kelepi Fifita on the MLR website, which therefore listed Fenoglio's tally of tries for the full season at 6 instead of 7.)
4	Hanco Germishuys	Austin Elite	6	6
5	Osea Kolinisau	Houston SaberCats	5	5
5	William Rasileka	Seattle Seawolves	3	5
5	Anthony Salaber	San Diego Legion	5	5
5	Josua Vici	Houston SaberCats	5	5
9	Lote Tuipulotu	Utah Warriors	4	4
9	Mathew Turner	Seattle Seawolves	4	4
9	Sam Windsor	Houston SaberCats	4	4
9	Marcus Walsh	Austin Elite	4	4

Sources:Americas Rugby News and MLR (archived).

=== Leading point scorers ===
No.	Player	Team	Points excl. playoffs	Total points
1	Sam Windsor	Houston SaberCats	103	103
2	Timothée Guillimin	Austin Elite	84	84
3	Will Magie	Glendale Raptors	64	77
4	JP Eloff	New Orleans Gold	65	65
5	Brock Staller	Seattle Seawolves	60	60
6	Kurt Morath	Utah Warriors	47	49
7	Tonata Lauti	Utah Warriors	40	45
8	Tadhg Leader	San Diego Legion	42	42
9	Peter Smith	Seattle Seawolves	20	41
10	Maximo de Achaval	Glendale Raptors	35	35

Sources: Americas Rugby News and MLR (archived).

=== Sanctions ===
Player	Team	Red	Yellow	Suspended match(es):
Zachary Pangelinan	Houston SaberCats	1	2	vs. New Orleans Gold (W5)
Connor Cook	Glendale Raptors	1	0	vs. Austin Elite (W1)
Ben Landry	Glendale Raptors	1	0	vs. Austin Elite (W1)
Jake Turnbull	Houston SaberCats	0	1	vs. New Orleans Gold (W1)
Eric Howard	New Orleans Gold	0	1	vs. Houston SaberCats (W1)
Ben Mitchell	Austin Elite	0	1	vs. Glendale Raptors (W1)
Sani Taylor	Austin Elite	0	1	vs. Glendale Raptors (W1)
Kelepi Fifita	Glendale Raptors	0	1	vs. Austin Elite (W1)
Sione Tuihalamaka	San Diego Legion	0	1	vs. Seattle Seawolves (W1)
Matt Trouville	Houston SaberCats	0	1	vs. Austin Elite (W2)
Maximo de Achaval	Glendale Raptors	0	1	vs. Seattle Seawolves (W2)
Siaosi Finau	Austin Elite	0	1	vs. New Orleans Gold (W3)
Pago Haini	Houston SaberCats	0	1	vs. San Diego Legion (W3)
Taylor Howden	New Orleans Gold	0	1	vs. Seattle Seawolves (W4)
Hubert Buydens	New Orleans Gold	0	1	vs. Houston SaberCats (W5)
Chris Slater	Houston SaberCats	0	1	vs. Glendale Raptors (W8)
Anthony Parry	New Orleans Gold	0	1	vs. San Diego Legion (W8)
Cam Poison	Seattle Seawolves	0	1	vs. Glendale Raptors (W9)
Alec Barton	San Diego Legion	0	1	vs. Austin Elite (W9)
Ben Mitchell	Austin Elite	0	1	vs. San Diego Legion (W9)
Alec Barton	San Diego Legion	0	1	vs. Seattle Seawolves (SF)
Siaosi Mahoni	San Diego Legion	0	1	vs. Seattle Seawolves (SF)

== Awards ==
MVP of the Championship Match

Player	Team
(United States) Vili Toluta'u	Seattle Seawolves

All-MLR First Team

Player	Position	Team
(United States) Paul Mullen	Loosehead Prop	Houston SaberCats
(United States) Zach Fenoglio	Hooker	Glendale Raptors
(Australia) Tim Metcher	Tighthead Prop	Seattle Seawolves
(Ireland) Ben Mitchell	Left Lock	Austin Elite
(United States) Ben Landry	Right Lock	Glendale Raptors
(United States) Vili Toluta'u	Blindside Flanker	Seattle Seawolves
(United States) Hanco Germishuys	Openside Flanker	Austin Elite
(United States) Cam Dolan	No8	San Diego Legion
(Canada) Phil Mack	Scrum-half	Seattle Seawolves
(Australia) Sam Windsor	Fly-half	Houston SaberCats
(United States) Tonata Lauti	Blindside Wing	Utah Warriors
(United States) Paul Lasike	Inside Centre	Utah Warriors
(United States) Ryan Matyas	Outside Centre	San Diego Legion
(United States) Harley Davidson	Openside Wing	Glendale Raptors
(England) Mathew Turner	Fullback	Seattle Seawolves

All-MLR Second Team

Player	Position	Team
(United States) Olive Kilifi	Loosehead Prop	Seattle Seawolves
(United States) Pat Blair	Hooker	San Diego Legion
(United States) Alex Tucci	Tighthead Prop	Utah Warriors
(United States) Matt Jensen	Left Lock	Utah Warriors
(United States) Matt Trouville	Right Lock	Houston SaberCats
(United States) Peter Dahl	Blindside Flanker	Glendale Raptors
(United States) Matt Hughston	Openside Flanker	NOLA Gold
(Australia) Sam Figg	No8	Glendale Raptors
(United States) Shaun Davies	Scrum-half	Glendale Raptors
(United States) Will Magie	Fly-half	Glendale Raptors
(Fiji) Josua Vici	Blindside Wing	Houston SaberCats
(United States) Andrew Suniula	Inside Centre	Austin Elite
(Fiji) Osea Kolinisau	Outside Centre	Houston SaberCats
(Canada) Brock Staller	Openside Wing	Seattle Seawolves
(United States) Zinzan Elan-Puttick	Fullback	Austin Elite
