= List of 2020–21 Major League Rugby transfers =

This is a list of player transfers involving Major League Rugby teams that occurred from the end of the 2020 season and through the 2021 season. The season saw the departure of the Colorado Raptors and the addition of the LA Giltinis. The Dallas Jackals were originally scheduled to take part, but withdrew before the start of the season, delaying their debut until 2022.

== Rugby ATL ==
Players in

- (United States) Connor Cook from (United States) Colorado Raptors
- Bautista Ezcurra from Argentina Sevens
- (South Africa) Rowan Gouws from (New Zealand) Otago
- (United States) Mike Matarazzo from (United States) Notre Dame
- (Netherlands) Jonas Petrakopolous from (United States) Rugby United New York
- (South Africa) Robbie Petzer from (United States) Dallas Jackals
- (United States) Ryan Rees from (United States) Life University
- (United States) John Scotti from (United States) Arkansas State
- (United States) Lincoln Sii from (United States) Grand Canyon University
- (United States) Jalen Tatum from (United States) Kennesaw State
- (United States) Daemon Torres from (United States) Life University

Players out

- (United States) Jamie Ferrante retired
- (Ireland) Cronan Gleeson to (United States) San Diego Legion
- (United States) Julian Montes retired
- (United States) Harley Wheeler to (United States) USA Sevens

== Austin Gilgronis ==
Players in

- (United States) Bryce Campbell from (England) London Irish
- (South Africa) Robbie Coetzee from (South Africa) Lions
- (South Africa) Sebastian de Chaves from (England) London Irish
- Cole Davis from Canada Sevens
- (United States) Cam Dodson from (United States) Grand Canyon University
- (Canada) Jeff Hassler from (United States) Seattle Seawolves
- (Australia) Maclean Jones from (Australia) Warringah
- (United States) Mason Koch from (United States) Dartmouth
- (Australia) Mack Mason from (Australia) Waratahs
- (United States) Conner Mooneyham from (United States) Dallas Jackals
- (Canada) Reegan O'Gorman from (Canada) Toronto Arrows
- (United States) Christian Ostberg from (France) Aurillac
- (Australia) Hugh Roach from (New Zealand) Crusaders
- (New Zealand) Isaac Ross from (New Zealand) Tasman
- (United States) Paddy Ryan from (United States) Rugby United New York
- (United States) Sidney Shoop from (United States) 404 Rugby
- (United States) Lui Sitama from (United States) American International College
- (United States) Jake Turnbull from (Australia) Randwick

Players out

- (United States) Skyler Adams to (United States) Dallas Jackals
- (Australia) Adam Ashley-Cooper to (United States) LA Giltinis
- (Uruguay) Juan Echeverría to (Uruguay) Peñarol
- (South Africa) Tiaan Erasmus to (United States) Houston SaberCats
- (Samoa) Potu Leavasa Jr. to (New Zealand) Counties Manukau
- (Brazil) Wilton Rebolo to (United States) Rugby United New York
- (Samoa) Lino Saunitoga released
- (United States) Chris Schade released
- (Uruguay) Rodrigo Silva to (Uruguay) Peñarol
- (Australia) Peni Tagive to (United States) Dallas Jackals
- (United States) Luca Tani to (United States) LA Giltinis

== Dallas Jackals ==
On January 19, 2021, the Dallas Jackals released a statement announcing that they had withdrawn from the 2021 season.

Players in

- (United States) Skyler Adams from (United States) Austin Gilgronis
- (United States) Mike Brown from (United States) Rugby United New York
- (United States) Will Burke from (United States) Rugby United New York
- (Namibia) Wian Conradie from (England) Doncaster Knights
- (South Africa) Carlo de Nysschen from (United States) Colorado Raptors
- (South Africa) Jo-Hanko de Villiers from (South Africa) Golden Lions
- (Fiji) Josateki Degei from (Fiji) Namosi
- (Samoa) Marco Fepulea'i from (New Zealand) Auckland
- (United States) Kepeli Fifita from (United States) Colorado Raptors
- (United States) Chad Gough from (United States) Colorado Raptors
- (United States) Tommy Hunkin-Clark from (United States) American International College
- (United States) Ryan James from (United States) Colorado Raptors
- (United States) Campbell Johnstone from (United States) Colorado Raptors
- (United States) Chad London from (United States) Colorado Raptors
- (Scotland) James Malcolm from (England) London Scottish
- Theo McFarland from Manuma Samoa
- (United States) Conner Mooneyham from (United States) Life University
- (South Korea) Jinho Mun from (United States) Dallas Harlequins
- (United States) Kareem Odeh from (United States) Life University
- (New Zealand) Tim O'Malley from (New Zealand) Tasman
- (United States) Kody O'Neil from (United States) Colorado Raptors
- (South Africa) Robbie Petzer from (United States) Colorado Raptors
- (United States) Cristian Rodriguez from (United States) Belmont Shore
- (Argentina) Conrado Roura from (Argentina) Ceibos
- (Fiji) Tuidraki Samusamuvodre from (Fiji) Naitasiri
- (Canada) Hank Stevenson from (Canada) Torondo Nomads
- (Australia) Peni Tagive from (United States) Austin Gilgronis
- (United States) Bronson Teles from (United States) University of Arizona
- (United States) Levi van Lanen from (United States) UW-Whitewater
- (Fiji) Jonetani Vasurakuta from (Fiji) Nadroga

Players out

- (United States) Skyler Adams released
- (United States) Mike Brown free agent
- (United States) Will Burke free agent
- (Namibia) Wian Conradie free agent
- (South Africa) Carlo de Nysschen to (United States) San Diego Legion
- (South Africa) Jo-Hanko de Villiers to (South Africa) Griquas
- (Fiji) Josateki Degei to (United States) TBC
- (Samoa) Marco Fepulea'i to (United States) LA Giltinis
- (United States) Kepeli Fifita to (United States) TBC
- (United States) Chad Gough to (United States) TBC
- (United States) Tommy Hunkin-Clark to (United States) Seattle Seawolves
- (United States) Ryan James to (United States) LA Giltinis
- (United States) Campbell Johnstone to (United States) Colorado XOs
- (United States) Chad London released
- (Scotland) James Malcolm free agent
- Theo McFarland to Samoa Sevens
- (United States) Conner Mooneyham to (United States) Austin Gilgronis
- (South Korea) Jinho Mun to (United States) Houston SaberCats
- (United States) Kareem Odeh free agent
- (New Zealand) Tim O'Malley released
- (United States) Kody O'Neil to (United States) Houston SaberCats
- (South Africa) Robbie Petzer to (United States) Rugby ATL
- (United States) Cristian Rodriguez to (United States) LA Giltinis
- (Argentina) Conrado Roura to (Uruguay) Peñarol
- (Fiji) Tuidraki Samusamuvodre to (United States) TBC
- (Canada) Hank Stevenson free agent
- (Australia) Peni Tagive free agent
- (United States) Bronson Teles to (United States) Houston SaberCats
- (United States) Levi van Lanen free agent
- (Fiji) Jonetani Vasurakuta to (United States) TBC

== Old Glory DC ==
Players in

- (United States) David Beach from (United States) Mystic River
- (Canada) Luke Campbell from (Canada) Toronto Arrows
- (Ireland) Jamie Dever from (United States) San Diego Legion
- (New Zealand) Callum Gibbins from (Scotland) Glasgow Warriors
- (Scotland) Matthew Gordon from (United States) University of Mary Washington
- (Australia) James King from (Hong Kong) Valley
- (Scotland) Steven Longwell from (Italy) Verona
- (Australia) Harry Masters from (United States) University of Mary Washington
- (United States) Casey Renaud from (United States) Kutztown University
- (United States) Danny Thomas from (United States) Belmont Shore

Players out

- (United States) Matt Hughston released
- (Canada) Travis Larsen to (United States) San Diego Legion
- (South Africa) Tendai Mtawarira retired
- (United States) Jake Turnbull to (Australia) Randwick

== Houston SaberCats ==
Players in

- (Fiji) Paula Balekana from (Italy) Zebre
- (Fiji) Veramu Dikidikitali from (Fiji) Naitasiri
- (South Africa) Tiaan Erasmus from (United States) Austin Gilgronis
- (Canada) Nik Hildebrand from (Canada) Pacific Pride
- (Georgia (country)) Nikoloz Khatiashvili from (Russia) Enisei-STM
- (Belgium) Jérémy Lenaerts from (United States) Seattle Seawolves
- (Romania) Moa Maliepo from (Romania) Timisoara Saracens
- (South Korea) Jinho Mun from (United States) Dallas Jackals
- (Canada) Liam Murray from (Canada) Pacific Pride
- (United States) Kody O'Neil from (United States) Dallas Jackals
- (Canada) Robbie Povey from (United States) Utah Warriors
- (Canada) Crosby Stewart from (Canada) Pacific Pride
- (Fiji) Apisai Tauyavuca from (Italy) Zebre
- (United States) Bronson Teles from (United States) Dallas Jackals

Players out

- (South Africa) Kyle Breytenbach opt-out of season
- (United States) Victor Comptat to (France) Olympique Marcquois
- (Fiji) Osea Kolinisau released
- (Belgium) Jérémy Lenaerts opt-out of season
- (South Africa) Tiaan Loots released
- (New Zealand) Boyd Wiggins retired

== LA Giltinis ==
Players in

- (Australia) Charlie Abel from (Australia) Gordon
- (Scotland) Adam Ashe from (Scotland) Glasgow Warriors
- (Australia) Adam Ashley-Cooper from (United States) Austin Gilgronis
- (United States) Nick Boyer from (United States) Colorado Raptors
- (Scotland) Glenn Bryce from (Scotland) Glasgow Warriors
- (Australia) Luke Burton from (United States) San Diego Legion
- (Ireland) Luke Carty from (Ireland) Connacht
- (Australia) Angus Cottrell from (Australia) Melbourne Rebels
- (Australia) Nathan Den Hoedt from (Australia) Randwick
- (Australia) Dave Dennis from (England) Exeter Chiefs
- (Samoa) Marco Fepulea'i from (United States) Dallas Jackals
- (United States) Watson Filikitonga from (United States) Iona College
- (United States) Pago Haini from (United States) New England Free Jacks
- (United States) Langilangi Haupeakui from (United States) Life West
- (Australia) Harrison Goddard from (Australia) Gordon
- (United States) Ryan James from (United States) Dallas Jackals
- (United States) Mika Kruse from (United States) Colorado Raptors
- (Samoa) Vise Leasi from (United States) Belmont Shore
- (United States) Stephen McLeish from (United States) Lindenwood University
- Harry McNulty from Ireland Sevens
- (Ireland) Sean McNulty from (United States) New England Free Jacks
- (Australia) Bill Meakes from (England) London Irish
- (United States) Jeffrey Peleseuma from (United States) SFGG
- (Australia) Christian Poidevin from (Australia) Randwick
- (United States) Christian Rodriguez from (United States) Dallas Jackals
- (United States) Blake Rogers from (United States) Colorado Raptors
- (United States) John Ryberg from (United States) Colorado Raptors
- (United States) Mafi Seanoa from (United States) Belmont Shore
- (South Africa) JP Smith from (Australia) Queensland Reds
- (South Africa) Ruan Smith from (Australia) Queensland Reds
- (Canada) Lindsey Stevens from (United States) New Orleans Gold
- (United States) Luca Tani from (United States) Austin Gilgronis
- (Australia) Corey Thomas from (Japan) Sunwolves
- (United States) Sione Tu’ihalamaka from (United States) San Diego Legion
- (Tonga) Mahe Vailanu from (Australia) Gordon
- (Canada) D. T. H. van der Merwe from (Scotland) Glasgow Warriors
- (Australia) Luke White from (United States) Colorado Raptors

Players out

- (United States) Stephen McLeish to (United States) New Orleans Gold

== New England Free Jacks ==
Players in

- (England) Harry Barlow from (England) Harlequins
- (New Zealand) Harrison Boyle from (New Zealand) Otago
- (United States) Tom Brusati from (United States) Saint Mary's
- (South Africa) Erich de Jager from (South Africa) Cheetahs
- (Australia) Sef Fa'agase from (New Zealand) Otago
- (Scotland) Dougie Fife from (Scotland) Edinburgh
- (United States) Nick Hryekewicz from (United States) Saint Mary's
- (South Africa) Pieter Jansen from (South Africa) Lions
- (United States) Justin Johnson from (United States) Life University
- (New Zealand) Joe Johnston from (New Zealand) Bay of Plenty
- (United States) Spencer Krueger from (United States) Ohio State
- (United States) Jack Miller from (United States) University of Colorado
- (South Africa) Tera Mtembu from (South Africa) Sharks
- (New Zealand) Aleki Morris-Lome from (New Zealand) Otago
- (Tonga) Jack Ram from (England) Coventry
- (United States) Vili Toluta'u from (United States) Seattle Seawolves
- (South Africa) Xandré Vos from (South Africa) Southern Kings
- (United States) Matt Wirken from (United States) Rugby United New York
- (Scotland) Sean Yacoubian from (United States) Colorado Raptors

Players out

- (France) Simon Courcoul to (France) Rennes
- (Fiji) Naulia Dawai released
- (France) Timothée Guillimin to (United States) New Orleans Gold
- (United States) Pago Haini to (United States) LA Giltinis
- (New Zealand) Brad Hemopo to (Australia) Northern Suburbs
- (United States) Ben Landry released
- (Ireland) Sean McNulty to (United States) LA Giltinis
- (United States) Deion Mikesell to (France) Carcassonne
- (United States) Erik Thompson released

== New Orleans Gold ==
Players in

- (United States) Cian Barry from (United States) UCLA
- (Argentina) Juan Cappiello from (France) Mont-de-Marsan
- (South Africa) JP du Plessis from (United States) San Diego Legion
- (United States) Andrew Guerra from (United States) Notre Dame College
- (United States) Stephen McLeish from (United States) LA Giltinis
- (United States) Brian Nault from (United States) Central Washington University
- (United States) Pat O'Toole from (Ireland) Garryowen
- (United States) Kyle Rogers from unattached
- (United States) Devin Short from (United States) San Diego Legion
- (Namibia) Damian Stevens from (Paraguay) Olimpia Lions
- (United States) Jack Webster from (United States) LSU

Players out

- (Canada) Lindsey Stevens to (United States) LA Giltinis

== Rugby United New York ==
Players in

- (Argentina) Benjamín Bonasso from (Argentina) Club Newman
- (United States) Conner Buckley from (United States) Iona College
- Apenisa Cakaubalavu from Fiji Sevens
- (United States) Nick Civetta from (England) Oxford University
- (New Zealand) Andrew Ellis from (Japan) Kobelco Steelers
- (New Zealand) Faʻasui Fuatai from (New Zealand) Bay of Plenty
- (New Zealand) Dan Hollinshead from (New Zealand) Bay of Plenty
- (Ireland) Evan Mintern from (Ireland) Cork Constitution
- (United States) Conor McManus from (New Zealand) Canterbury
- (Argentina) Joel Miranda from (Argentina) Jockey Club
- (Canada) Quinn Ngawati from (Canada) Toronto Wolfpack
- (New Zealand) Kara Pryor from (New Zealand) Northland
- (Brazil) Wilton Rebolo from (United States) Austin Gilgronis
- (Samoa) Sakaria Taulafo from (United States) Colorado Raptors
- (Fiji) Samu Tawake from (New Zealand) Manawatu

Players out

- (Argentina) JP Aguirre to (United States) Seattle Seawolves
- (France) Mathieu Bastareaud to (France) Lyon
- (United States) Mike Brown to (United States) Dallas Jackals
- (United States) Will Burke to (United States) Dallas Jackals
- (United States) Mark O'Keeffe released
- (United States) Alex MacDonald to (United States) 404 Rugby
- (United States) Alec McDonnell released
- (Netherlands) Jonas Petrakopolous to (United States) Rugby ATL
- (United States) Paddy Ryan to (United States) Austin Gilgronis
- (United States) Matt Wirken to (United States) New England Free Jacks

== San Diego Legion ==
Players in

- Cecil Afrika from South Africa Sevens
- (South Africa) Bjorn Basson from (South Africa) Griquas
- (United States) Chris Baumann
- (Australia) Cam Clark from (Australia) Waratahs
- (South Africa) Carlo de Nysschen from (United States) Dallas Jackals
- (Ireland) Cronan Gleeson from (United States) Rugby ATL
- (Argentina) Santiago González Iglesias from (Japan) Munakata Sanix Blues
- (Canada) Travis Larsen from (United States) Old Glory DC
- (New Zealand) Lua Li from (New Zealand) Northland
- (United States) Patrick Madden from (United States) Cal Poly
- (England) Chris Robshaw from (England) Harlequins
- (Canada) Michael Smith from (Canada) UBC Thunderbirds
- (United States) Cole Zarcone from (United States) Central Washington University

Players out

- (Australia) Luke Burton to (United States) LA Giltinis
- (Ireland) Jamie Dever to (United States) Old Glory DC
- (United States) Devereaux Ferris to (United States) Seattle Seawolves
- (United States) JP du Plessis to (United States) New Orleans Gold
- (United States) Paul Mullen to (United States) Utah Warriors
- (New Zealand) Ma'a Nonu to (France) Toulon
- (United States) Devin Short to (United States) New Orleans Gold
- (United States) Mike Te'o to (United States) Utah Warriors
- (United States) Sione Tu'ihalamaka to (United States) LA Giltinis
- (Italy) Joshua Furno to (France) Tarbes

== Seattle Seawolves ==
Players in

- (Argentina) JP Aguirre from (United States) Rugby United New York
- (United States) Keanu Andrade from (United States) University of California
- (United States) Devereaux Ferris from (United States) San Diego Legion
- (South Africa) Rhyno Herbst from (South Africa) Lions
- (United States) Tommy Hunkin-Clark from (United States) Dallas Jackals
- (Ireland) Kieran Joyce from (England) Birmingham Moseley
- (United States) Aaron Matthews from (United States) Saint Mary's
- (Namibia) Obert Nortje from (Uruguay) Peñarol
- (United States) Nick Taylor from (United States) Lindenwood University

Players out

- (Canada) Jeff Hassler to (United States) Austin Gilgronis
- (United States) Olive Kilifi to (United States) Utah Warriors
- (Belgium) Jérémy Lenaerts to (United States) Houston SaberCats
- (United States) Vili Toluta'u to (United States) New England Free Jacks

== Toronto Arrows ==
Players in

- (South Africa) Ross Braude from (South Africa) Blue Bulls U21
- (Argentina) Gaston Cortes from (England) Leicester Tigers
- (Argentina) Juan Cruz González from (Argentina) CUBA
- (Canada) Jason Higgins from (Ireland) Cork Constitution
- (Argentina) Manuel Montero from (Paraguay) Olímpia Lions
- (Canada) Marc-Antoine Ouellet from (Canada) Pacific Pride
- (Argentina) Joaquín Tuculet from (Argentina) Jaguares
- (Canada) Siaki Vikilani from (Canada) Pacific Pride
- (Canada) Adrian Wadden from (England) Leeds Beckett

Players out

- (Australia) Richie Asiata to (Australia) Queensland Reds
- (Canada) Luke Campbell to (United States) Old Glory DC
- (Canada) Riley di Nardo released
- (New Zealand) Sam Malcolm to (Japan) Kamaishi Seawaves
- (Canada) Dan Moor retired
- (Canada) Reegan O'Gorman to (United States) Austin Gilgronis
- (Canada) Mike Smith released
- (Canada) Josh van Horne released
- (Canada) Tom van Horne released

== Utah Warriors ==
Players in

- (Ireland) Matthew Dalton from (Australia) Bond University
- (United States) Derek Ellingson from (United States) Saint Mary's
- (South Africa) Aston Fortuin from (South Africa) Southern Kings
- (United States) Danny Giannascoli from (United States) Loyola University Maryland
- (United States) Elijah Hayes from (United States) Iowa Central
- (Canada) Fraser Hurst from (Canada) UBC Thunderbirds
- (Samoa) Rodney Iona from (Australia) Gordon
- (United States) Olive Kilifi from (United States) Seattle Seawolves
- (Namibia) Cliven Loubser from (England) Leeds Tykes
- (United States) Joseph Mano from (United States) Utah Selects
- (United States) Paul Mullen from (United States) San Diego Legion
- (United States) John Powers from (United States) Iona College
- (United States) Logan Tago from (Canada) Montreal Alouettes
- (United States) Mike Te'o from (United States) San Diego Legion

Players out

- (United States) John Cullen retired
- (United States) Ara Elkington released
- (New Zealand) Blake Hohaia to (New Zealand) Northland
- (Samoa) Dwayne Polataivao to (New Zealand) Tasman
- (Canada) Robbie Povey to (United States) Houston Sabercats
- (United States) Huluholo Mo’ungaloa released
- (United States) Gannon Moore released
- (Fiji) Vatemo Ravouvou released
- (United States) Nolan Tuamoheloa released
- (Tonga) Ricky Tu’ihalangingie released
- (New Zealand) Kalolo Tuiloma to (New Zealand) Northland
- (Tonga) Fetuʻu Vainikolo released

== See also ==
- List of 2019–20 Major League Rugby transfers
- List of 2020–21 Premiership Rugby transfers
- List of 2020–21 RFU Championship transfers
- List of 2020–21 Super Rugby transfers
- List of 2020–21 Pro14 transfers
- List of 2020–21 Top 14 transfers
