= 2023 MLR Draft =

Annual United States rugby union draft

General information
- Date: August 17, 2023

Overview
- League: Major League Rugby
- First selection: Rick Rose, Lock, Miami Sharks

The 2023 MLR Collegiate Draft was the fourth annual for rugby union in North America, held on August 17, 2023.

== Format ==
The 2023 MLR Collegiate Draft was held on August 17, 2023. Like the previous three iterations, the MLR Collegiate Draft was aired in part on Fox Sports 2.

== Player selections ==
Rd	Pick #	MLR team	Player	Pos.	College
1	1	Miami Sharks	Rick Rose	Lock	St. Bonaventure
1	2	Houston SaberCats	Max Schumacher	Fly-Half	California
1	3	Dallas Jackals	Marques Fualaau	Flanker	Central Washington University
1	4	Chicago Hounds	Noah Brown	Center	Indiana
1	5	Rugby ATL	Matthew Anticev	Fly-Half	Dartmouth College
1	6	New Orleans Gold	Julian Roberts	Fly-Half	Life University
1	7	New Orleans Gold	Clan Darling	Flanker	Lindenwood
1	8	Rugby United New York	Nicholas Lapponese	Number Eight	Fairfield University
1	9	Houston SaberCats	Orrin Bizer	Flanker	Life University
1	10	San Diego Legion	James Rivers	Lock	University of Arizona
1	11	New Orleans Gold	Gabriel Mahuinga	Hooker	BYU
1	12	San Diego Legion	Tyren Al-Jiboori	Wing	Lindenwood
1	13	New England Free Jacks	Gabriel Casey	Inside Center	University of Victoria
2	14	Miami Sharks	Charlie Overton	Lock	Life University
2	15	Toronto Arrows	Louis Millet	Flanker	Bishop's University
2	16	Chicago Hounds	Juan Pen	Tighthead Prop	St. Bonaventure
2	17	Chicago Hounds	Daelan Denenberg	Wing	Santa Clara University
2	18	Rugby ATL	Jackson Zabierek	Hooker	UC Santa Cruz
2	19	Utah Warriors	Josh Halladay	Lock	Trinity Western University
2	20	Utah Warriors	Michael Biagi	Flanker	BYU
2	21	Rugby United New York	Albert O'Shannessey	Flanker	Central Washington University
2	22	Utah Warriors	Abe Turpen	Flanker	University of Arizona
2	23	New England Free Jacks	Junior Gafa	Outside Center	Brown University
2	24	Seattle Seawolves	Scott Bowers	Hooker	Trinity Western University
2	25	San Diego Legion	Michael Ramos	Flanker	University of San Diego
2	26	New England Free Jacks	William Chevalier	Scrum-Half	Indiana
3	27	Miami Sharks	Setu Vole	Tighthead Prop	Lindenwood
3	28	Toronto Arrows	Monty Weatherall	Fly-Half	McGill University
3	29	Dallas Jackals	Connor Olvera	Wing	BYU
3	30	Chicago Hounds	Clayton Means	Inside Center	Lindenwood
3	31	Rugby ATL	Oli Griffiths	Fullback	UCLA
3	32	Dallas Jackals	Ronnie McElligott	Flanker	St. Mary's College
3	33	Utah Warriors	Isaia Kruse	Wing	Fresno State University
3	34	Rugby United New York	Gjergji Bacuku	Loosehead Prop	Hofstra University
3	35	Houston SaberCats	Anton Viera	Flanker	Santa Clara University
3	36	Dallas Jackals	Noah Wright	Wing	Central Washington University
3	37	Rugby ATL	Nathan Beil	Flanker	UCLA
3	38	San Diego Legion	Joseph Hawthorne	Loosehead Prop	St. Bonaventure
3	39	Rugby ATL	Nicholas Hartley	Scrum-Half Prop	Missouri S&T

Source: MLR
