= Sean McNulty =

Irish rugby union player (born 1995)

- Born: 7 October 1995 (age 31) London, England
- Height: 6 ft 2 in (1.88 m)
- Weight: 245 lb (111 kg)
- School: Rockwell College
- University: University College Dublin; University of Hertfordshire

Rugby union career
- Position: Hooker
Youth career
- 2006–2007: Bahrain RFC
- 2011–2014: Munster Rugby
- 2015–2016: Leinster Rugby
Senior career
Years	Team	Apps	(Points)
2016–2018	Leinster A	11	(5)
2019–2020	New England	5	(0)
2019	→RUNY (loan)	3	(0)
2021–2022	LA Giltinis	14	(0)
2022	Seattle Seawolves	8	(5)
2023	San Diego Legion	4	(5)
2024	Miami Sharks	16	(10)
- Correct as of 27 March 2024
International career
Years	Team	Apps	(Points)
2013	Ireland Schoolboys		
2014	Ireland U19		
2014–2015	Ireland U20	7	(0)

Sean McNulty (born 10 July 1995) is a professional rugby union player who last played as a hooker for the Miami Sharks of Major League Rugby (MLR).

He previously played as a hooker for the MLR's New England Free Jacks and Rugby United New York (RUNY) on loan for the 2019 Major League Rugby season. McNulty came through the Munster Rugby academy system before joining the Leinster Rugby Academy and playing for Leinster A in the British & Irish Cup.

He signed with LA Giltinis prior to the 2021 MLR season and won the 2021 MLR championship with the team. During the 2022 season, he was traded to the Seattle Seawolves. Following the 2022 season, McNulty was traded by the Seawolves to the San Diego Legion in exchange for Ben Mitchell. Prior to the 2024 MLR season, San Diego Legion traded McNulty to Miami Sharks in exchange for 2024 salary cap considerations.

Sean McNulty made his debut for the United States national rugby team against Canada on August 31st, 2024.

== See also ==
- Harry McNulty (brother)
