= Will Holder (rugby union) =

American rugby union player

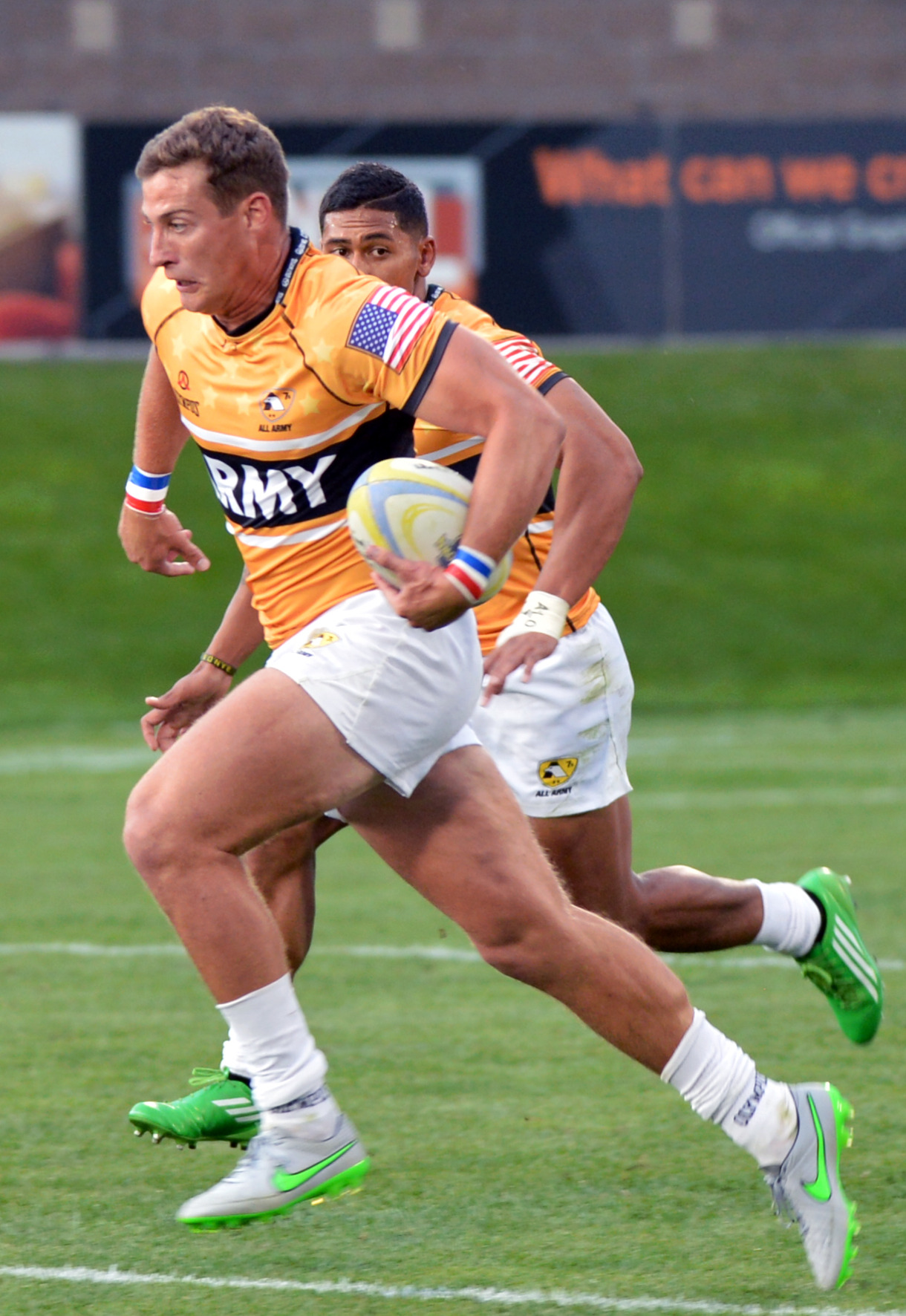
- Holder in 2015
- Born: 19 March 1991 (age 35) Frankfurt, Germany
- Height: 6 ft 2 in (188 cm)
- Weight: 330 lb (23 st 8 lb; 150 kg)

Rugby union career
Amateur team(s)
Years	Team	Apps	(Points)
2015	Army		
Senior career
Years	Team	Apps	(Points)
2018	Seattle Seawolves	8	(21)
2019	San Diego Legion	4	(2)
- Correct as of 30 December 2020
International career
Years	Team	Apps	(Points)
2012–2016	United States	7	(27)
- Correct as of 30 December 2020
National sevens team
Years	Team		Comps
2014–2016	United States		7

William Holder (born 19 March 1991) is an American rugby player who played for the San Diego Legion in Major League Rugby (MLR) and for the United States national rugby union team 15s and sevens side as a fly half.

Holder won a bronze medal at the 2015 Pan American Games.

== Personal life ==
He graduated from the United States Military Academy and served as first lieutenant with the United States Army. He took up rugby in the third grade inspired by his father.
