= Jamie Dever =

Irish rugby union player

- Born: 30 January 1993 (age 33) Westport, County Mayo, Ireland
- Height: 6 ft 1 in (1.85 m)
- Weight: 264 lb (120 kg)
- School: Rice College, Westport

Rugby union career
- Position: Prop
Youth career
- Westport RFC
Amateur team(s)
Years	Team	Apps	(Points)
2016–2017	Buccaneers RFC		
2017	Cambridge		
Senior career
Years	Team	Apps	(Points)
2018–2019	Houston Sabercats	16	(10)
2020	San Diego Legion	3	(0)
2021	Old Glory DC	14	(0)
2021–2022	London Irish	1	
Provincial / State sides
Years	Team	Apps	(Points)
2014–2017	Connacht	1	(0)
International career
Years	Team	Apps	(Points)
2012	Ireland U20	1	(0)

Jamie Dever (born 30 January 1993) is an Irish professional rugby union player who plays as a prop. Currently unattached he most recently played for London Irish in the Premiership Rugby. Dever made his debut for London Irish on 30 October 2021.

Dever previously played prop for Old Glory DC and the Houston Sabercats in Major League Rugby.

He also played for Connacht in the Pro14 competition and the Cambridge in the semi-professional National League 1 in England.
