= Paul Healy (rugby union) =

Rugby union career
- Position: Coach
- Current team: Houston SaberCats
Coaching career
- Years: Team
- 1999–2002: Stade Français (Asst.)
- 2002–2004: Swansea RFC (Asst.)
- 2007: Ballymore Tornadoes (Asst.)
- 2011–2013: Ordizia RE
- 2014: CSM București
- 2014–2016: Chile
- 2018–2019: Germany (Asst.)
- 2019–2021: Houston SaberCats

Paul Healy is an Australian rugby union coach who most recently served as the head coach of the Houston SaberCats of Major League Rugby (MLR). He has been involved in several international teams in multiple capacities including Uruguay, Chile, Brazil, and Germany. He also previously served as head coach for Ordizia RE of Spain's División de Honor and CSM București of Romania's SuperLiga.

While an assistant coach with Stade Français his team were champions of France's Top 14 in 2000, and were runners-up in the 2001 Heineken Cup Final (European Rugby Champions Cup). While head coach, his Ordizia RE team won the Copa del Rey for the first time, and were runners-up of the División de Honor two times.

The Houston SaberCats announced that they had hired Healy as Director of Rugby & Head Coach ahead of the 2020 season in early-August 2019. After posting a 3–13 record, it was announced on June 10, 2021, that Healy would not return as head coach for the 2022 MLR season.
