= Sam Windsor =

Australian rugby union player

- Born: Samuel Windsor; 12 June 1987 (age 39) Bungendore, NSW, Australia
- Height: 1.85 m (6 ft 1 in)
- Weight: 94 kg (207 lb; 14 st 11 lb)

Rugby union career
- Position: Fly-half
Amateur team(s)
Years	Team	Apps	(Points)
2008, 2013–14	Queanbeyan Whites		
2009	Eastern Suburbs		
2010–2012	Blackheath		
Senior career
Years	Team	Apps	(Points)
2014	NSW Country Eagles	9	(91)
2018–2021	Houston SaberCats	45	(432)
2022–2023	Rugby New York	33	(115)
- Correct as of 27 February 2023
Provincial / State sides
Years	Team	Apps	(Points)
2015–16	Ulster	8	(37)
- Correct as of 20 August 2016

Sam Windsor (born 12 June 1987) is an Australian professional rugby union player who currently plays as a fly-half for the Seattle Seawolves in Major League Rugby (MLR).

== Professional rugby ==
Windsor joined the Brumbies Academy in Canberra in 2008, before playing with English club Blackheath for two seasons from 2010 to 2012.

He played for NSW Country Eagles in the inaugural season of the National Rugby Championship in 2014, and signed a one-year contract to play for Ulster in 2015–16.
