= Lote Tuipulotu =

Tongan rugby union player

- Born: 22 November 1987 (age 38) Liahona, Tonga
- Height: 5 ft 6 in (1.68 m)
- Weight: 256 lb (116 kg)
- School: Liahona High School

Rugby union career
- Position: Hooker
Amateur team(s)
Years	Team	Apps	(Points)
2016-2018	Utah Brothers RFC		
Senior career
Years	Team	Apps	(Points)
2018	Utah Warriors	9	(15)
International career
Years	Team	Apps	(Points)
2014	Tonga rugby league		
2015	Tonga A		
2017	USA Islanders		

Lote Tuipulotu (born 22 November 1987) is an American professional rugby union player. He plays as a prop for the Utah Warriors in Major League Rugby.

Tupulotu was born in Tonga and educated at Liahona High School. He played for the Tonga national rugby league team from 2010 to 2014 and also for the Tonga A Rugby Union squad in 2015.

After moving to the United States in 2015 he was selected for the USA Islanders. In November 2017 he joined the Utah Warriors for the 2018 season.
