= Travis Larsen =

Canada international rugby union player

- Born: June 4, 1991 (age 35) Parksville, BC, Canada
- Height: 6 ft 3 in (191 cm)
- Weight: 242 lb (110 kg)
- Notable relative: Josh Larsen (brother)

Rugby union career
- Position: Flanker
Senior career
Years	Team	Apps	(Points)
2014–15	Lyons Piacenza		
2015–16	Petrarca Padova		
2019	Austin Elite		
2020	Old Glory DC		
2021	San Diego Legion		
2022	Seattle Seawolves		
2023–	Toronto Arrows		
International career
Years	Team	Apps	(Points)
2023–	Canada	2	(0)

Travis Larsen (born June 4, 1991) is a Canadian professional rugby union player.

== Early life ==
Born in Parksville, British Columbia, Larsen was raised in the New Zealand town of Paihia.

Larsen is the elder brother of Canada lock Josh Larsen.

== Rugby career ==
Larsen, a blindside flanker, played his early senior rugby for Auckland's Marist North Harbour club and became a New Zealand Universities representative player during his time at Massey University. From 2014 to 2016, Larsen had two seasons in Italy, with Lyons Piacenza and Petrarca Padova. He began playing Major League Rugby in 2019.

=== International rugby ===
Larsen was capped for Canada in two 2023 Test matches against Tonga in Nukuʻalofa.

== See also ==
- List of Canada national rugby union players
