= Pat Blair (rugby union) =

American rugby union player

- Born: 27 January 1990 (age 36) Tacoma, Washington
- Height: 6 ft 0 in (1.83 m)
- Weight: 220 lb (100 kg)
- School: Mount Tahoma High School
- University: Central Washington University

Rugby union career
- Position(s): Hooker, Flanker
Amateur team(s)
Years	Team	Apps	(Points)
2013	OMBAC		
2014	Orange County Ravens		
2015–2016	Seattle Saracens		
2017	San Diego Old Aztecs rugby		
Senior career
Years	Team	Apps	(Points)
2018–2019	San Diego Legion	18	(20)
International career
Years	Team	Apps	(Points)
2016	USA Selects	3	(0)
2016	United States	1	(0)
National sevens team
Years	Team		Comps
2013–2017	United States		14

Pat Blair (born 27 January 1990) is an American professional rugby union player. He plays as a hooker or flanker for the San Diego Legion in Major League Rugby (MLR) and previously for the USA 7s team and USA internationally.
