= Aladdin Schirmer =

American rugby union player

- Born: 31 December 1992 (age 33) North Bend, Washington
- Height: 6 ft 2 in (1.88 m)
- Weight: 225 lb (102 kg)
- School: Mount Si
- University: Central Washington University

Rugby union career
- Position(s): Flanker, No8, Lock
Youth career
- Eastside Lions RFC
Amateur team(s)
Years	Team	Apps	(Points)
2016-2018	Seattle Saracens		
Senior career
Years	Team	Apps	(Points)
2018–2019	Seattle Seawolves	14	(0)
2020	Colorado Raptors	1	(0)
- Correct as of 30 December 2020
International career
Years	Team	Apps	(Points)
2012	USA U20	3	(0)
2016–	USA Selects	4	(10)
2016	United States	2	(10)
National sevens team
Years	Team		Comps
2014	United States		2

Aladdin Schirmer (born 31 December 1992) is an American professional rugby union player. He played as a flanker or No.8 for the Seattle Seawolves and the Colorado Raptors in Major League Rugby (MLR).

He also played for the USA Eagles internationally.
