= Josua Vici =

Fijian rugby union footballer

- Born: 20 February 1994 (age 32) Kadavu, Fiji
- Height: 6 ft 2 in (1.88 m)
- Weight: 225 lb (102 kg)

Rugby union career
- Position: Wing/Centre
Youth career
- Raven Bluez RFC
Amateur team(s)
Years	Team	Apps	(Points)
2012-2016	Uluninakau RFC		
Senior career
Years	Team	Apps	(Points)
2018–2019	Houston Sabercats	12	(30)
2019–2021	Colomiers		
2021–2022	Montpellier		
2022	→ Montauban		
2022-	Montauban		
National sevens team
Years	Team		Comps
2016-2017	Fiji		

Josua Vici (born 20 February 1994) is a Fijian professional rugby union player. He plays as a winger for the US Colomiers in Pro D2 having previously played for the Houston SaberCats in Major League Rugby and previously for the Fiji 7s team internationally.

Vici is from Niudua in Kadavu Province.

In 2016 he was selected for the training squad for the 2016 Olympics, but was dropped from the squad.

In 2017 he was selected for the Fiji national rugby sevens team as a replacement for Savenaca Rawaca.
