= Connor Murphy (rugby union) =

English rugby union player

- Born: 8 September 1995 (age 31) Sunbury-on-Thames, England
- Height: 5 ft 9 in (1.75 m)
- Weight: 191 lb (87 kg)
- School: Sunbury Major School; St. Paul's Catholic College

Rugby union career
- Position: Scrum half
Youth career
- London Irish
Amateur team(s)
Years	Team	Apps	(Points)
2016–2017	Henley Hawks		
Senior career
Years	Team	Apps	(Points)
2014–2017	London Irish		
2018-present	Houston Sabercats	23	(15)
International career
Years	Team	Apps	(Points)
2012	England u16s		

Connor Murphy (born 8 September 1995) is an English professional rugby union player. He plays as a scrum half for the Houston Sabercats in Major League Rugby, previously coming through the academy ranks at London Irish.
