= Ben Mitchell (rugby union) =

Irish rugby union player

- Born: Ben Mitchell; 6 April 1994 (age 32) Nottingham, United Kingdom
- Height: 2.01 m (6 ft 7 in)
- Weight: 245 lb (111 kg)
- School: Midleton College, Ireland
- University: University College Cork, Ireland

Rugby union career
- Position: Lock
- Current team: Rugby Football Club Los Angeles
Amateur team(s)
Years	Team	Apps	(Points)
- Youghal RFC
- Midleton College
2012–2017	University College Cork RFC		
2016–	Gentlemen of Aspen		
Senior career
Years	Team	Apps	(Points)
2018–2019	Austin Elite	23	(20)
2020–2022	San Diego Legion	31	(15)
2023	Seattle Seawolves	11	
2024-	Rugby Football Club Los Angeles		
- Correct as of 29 April 2024
International career
Years	Team	Apps	(Points)
2021	USA Selects	2	

Ben Mitchell (born 6 April 1994) is an English-born Irish professional rugby union player who is currently a lock. As of 2024, he is with the United States team Rugby Football Club Los Angeles in Major League Rugby (MLR).

He previously played for Youghal RFC, University College Cork in Ireland, the Gentlemen of Aspen RFC of Colorado, Austin Elite, San Diego Legion and Seattle Seawolves.

== Career ==
Mitchell was educated at the independent Midleton College and then at University College Cork (UCC), both of which have produced leading rugby players. At UCC, he studied Commerce and joined University College Cork RFC. In his first year and a half, he played in the university club's under-20 team, then in 2014 joined the senior team in the All Ireland League, remaining on the team until halfway through the 2017/18 season. In 2015/2016, UCC RFC was promoted to Division 1 of the League. In 2016 and 2017, Mitchell was selected for the Irish Universities to play the English Universities. He played his last game for the team in November 2017. At the end of the 2016 AIL season Mitchell was selected on the bench for a Munster Rugby A/Development side against the Irish under 20s team

In 2016 and 2017, Mitchell was a summer player for the Gentlemen of Aspen in the Rocky Mountain Summer League, starring in the Ruggerfest tournament in 2017. In October 2017 he signed a two-year contract with Austin Elite to join the team for the inaugural Major League Rugby season of 2018 and was re-signed in January 2019.

In 2018 and 2019 Mitchell played as lock for Austin in every game but one. In 2019 he became team captain, taking over from Andrew Suniula. In 2018 Mitchell was named on the All-MLR 1st team and was regarded as the best lock in the competition. In 2019 he again achieved All-MLR honors by being named on the All-MLR 2nd team. In August 2019 he was signed by San Diego Legion, in what was seen as a major blow for the Austin franchise. In late 2020 he will qualify for the United States national rugby union team by residency in the US and is predicted to be of interest to the selectors.

In 2019 he was named as the head coach of the Gentlemen of Aspen. He helped the Gentlemen of Aspen to the 2021 Ruggerfest title as player/coach.

He was resigned by San Diego Legion for 2020–21.

In October 2021 Mitchell was selected for the United States national rugby union team Selects team to play in the Americas Pacific Challenge in Uruguay. Mitchell played in both games in Uruguay against Chile A and Brazil A and was singled out by head coach Mike Tolkin as one of the USA’s standout performers on the tour.

Mitchell became the 14th player in Major League Rugby history to play 50 times in the competition.

Mitchell was named in the All-MLR 1st team for the 2022 season. This was Mitchell’s 3rd All-MLR selection in 5 seasons, having been named on the 1st Team in 2018 and 2nd Team in 2019.

In the 2022 MLR offseason it was announced that Mitchell had signed a multi-year contract with the Seattle Seawolves franchise ahead of the 2023 MLR Season.

In April 2024 RFCLA confirmed the signing of Mitchell to bolster their squad for the remainder of the 2024 MLR season. Mitchell returned to MLR after spending time away from the sport to focus on professional life outside of Rugby. General Manager of RFCLA, Mark Carney had the following to say on RFCLA's newest addition: “We are excited to welcome Ben to RFCLA for 2024. Ben has a wealth of experience in the MLR and will be a vital member of the squad as we continue to develop our team identity".
