= Deion Mikesell =

American rugby union player

- Born: 7 January 1997 (age 29) Runnells, Iowa
- Height: 6 ft 0 in (1.83 m)
- Weight: 200 lb (91 kg)
- School: South East Polk High School
- University: Lindenwood University

Rugby union career
- Position: Winger
Senior career
Years	Team	Apps	(Points)
2018	Clermont Auvergne	0	(0)
2019	Houston Sabercats	9	(15)
2020	New England Free Jacks	4	(5)
2020–2021	US Carcassonne	7	(5)
- Correct as of 28 April 2023
International career
Years	Team	Apps	(Points)
2016-17	United States U20		
2016	All Americans		
2016–2017	United States	2	(5)
National sevens team
Years	Team		Comps
2015	USA Falcons		

Deion Mikesell (born 7 January 1997) is an American professional rugby union player. He played as a winger for the Houston Sabercats in Major League Rugby (MLR).

He previously signed with Clermont Auvergne on a developmental contract and also represented America with the United States national rugby union team internationally.
