= Don Pati =

American rugby union player

- Born: 24 May 1990 (age 36) Apia, Samoa
- Height: 5 ft 7 in (1.70 m)
- Weight: 190 lb (86 kg)
- School: Hunter High School
- University: University of Utah

Rugby union career
- Position(s): Full back, wing
Amateur team(s)
Years	Team	Apps	(Points)
- San Francisco Golden Gate
–	Park City Haggis RFC		
Senior career
Years	Team	Apps	(Points)
2018–2019	Utah Warriors	15	(25)
National sevens teams
Years	Team		Comps
2014	USA Falcons		
2016–2017	United States		6

Don Pati (born 24 May 1990) is a Samoan-born American professional rugby union player. He plays as a wing or full back for the Utah Warriors in Major League Rugby and previously for the USA Sevens team internationally.

Pati was born in Apia in Samoa and moved to the United States in 2004. He was educated at Hunter High School and the University of Utah.

In July 2021 he was named head coach of the University of Utah sevens team.
