= Simon Courcoul =

American rugby union player

- Born: 28 December 1995 (age 30) Laval, France
- Height: 6 ft 0 in (1.83 m)
- Weight: 260 lb (120 kg)

Rugby union career
- Position: Prop
Youth career
- 2012-2014: ASM Clermont Auvergne
Senior career
Years	Team	Apps	(Points)
2014-2015	Aviron Bayonnais		
2015-2017	RC Narbonne		
2017-2018	Grasse		
2019	Austin Elite	5	(0)
2019-	New England Free Jacks	5	(0)
International career
Years	Team	Apps	(Points)
2015	France u20		

Simon Courcoul (born 28 December 1995) is a French professional rugby union player. He plays as a prop for the New England Free Jacks in Major League Rugby, previously playing for the Austin Elite, RC Narbonne and Aviron Bayonnais professionally.
