= Matt Trouville =

Former Australian-American rugby union player

- Born: Matthew Trouville; 9 June 1986 (age 40) Darlinghurst, New South Wales, Australia
- Height: 1.95 m (6 ft 5 in)
- Weight: 115 kg (254 lb; 18 st 2 lb)
- School: Woolooware High School
- University: Australian College of Education

Rugby union career
- Position: Flanker
Amateur team(s)
Years	Team	Apps	(Points)
2006–2011	Southern Districts		
2011–2017	Seattle Saracens		
Senior career
Years	Team	Apps	(Points)
2017–2019	Houston SaberCats	23	(5)
- Correct as of 1 January 2021
International career
Years	Team	Apps	(Points)
2014–2015	United States	5	(0)

Matthew "Matt" Trouville (born 6 September 1986 in Darlinghurst, New South Wales) is an Australian-American former rugby union player who played flanker for the Houston SaberCats in Major League Rugby (MLR) and also for the United States Eagles rugby team.

Trouville made his debut for the United States in 2014 and was part of the squad at the 2015 Rugby World Cup.

Trouville retired in 2019 to start as a Customer Success Consultant at Logic20/20.
