= Zach Fenoglio =

US international rugby union player

- Born: July 29, 1989 (age 37) Denver, Colorado, U.S.
- Height: 6 ft 2 in (1.88 m)
- Weight: 255 lb (116 kg)
- School: Regis Jesuit High School

Rugby union career
- Position: Hooker
Senior career
Years	Team	Apps	(Points)
2016	Denver Stampede	11	(40)
2018–2019	Glendale Raptors	25	(30)
- Correct as of December 28, 2020
International career
Years	Team	Apps	(Points)
2012–2015	United States	17	(0)
- Correct as of December 28, 2020

Zach Fenoglio (born July 29, 1989) is a former rugby union footballer who played as a hooker for the United States national rugby union team. Fenoglio debuted for the U.S. national team on November 9, 2012, against Russia. Fenoglio was named to the U.S. national team for the 2015 Rugby World Cup.

Fenoglio played his club rugby in Denver, Colorado with the Glendale Raptors in Major League Rugby.

Fenoglio was a four-year letter winner at Regis Jesuit High School on both the football and rugby teams, despite hitting his growth spurt his senior year.
