= Timothée Guillimin =

French rugby player (born 1996)

- Born: 19 February 1996 (age 30) Pape'ete, French Polynesia
- Height: 5 ft 10 in (1.78 m)
- Weight: 195 lb (88 kg)
- School: College Capouchiné; Lycée Jean Moulin

Rugby union career
- Position(s): Fly half, Centre
- Current team: New England Free Jacks
Youth career
- 2012-2014: Montpellier Herault
Amateur team(s)
Years	Team	Apps	(Points)
2014-2016	Austin Huns		
Senior career
Years	Team	Apps	(Points)
2014-2016	SU Agen		
2018-2019	Austin Elite	14	(113)
2019-	New England Free Jacks		
International career
Years	Team	Apps	(Points)
2014	France u18		

Timothée Guillimin (born 19 February 1996) is a French professional rugby union player. He plays as a fly half for the New England Free Jacks in Major League Rugby (MLR).

Guillimin was educated College Capouchiné and Lycée Jean Moulin before attending UFR STAPS Montpellier and DUT GACO Agen.

He previously played for the Austin Elite (MLR) and SU Agen professionally.

In March 2021, he signed with New Orleans Gold. In January 2022, he became a business developer for RC Nîmes.
