= Utah Warriors =

US professional rugby union team from Salt Lake City, Utah

- Union: USA Rugby
- Founded: 2017; 9 years ago
- Disbanded: 2025; 1 year ago
- Ground(s): Zions Bank Stadium; Herriman, Utah (Capacity: 5,000)
- CEO: Kimball Kjar
- Most caps: Angus MacLellan (106)
- Top scorer: Joel Hodgson (329)
- Most tries: Joe Mano (39)
- League: Major League Rugby
- 2025: Western Conference: 1st Playoffs: Conference runner-up
Team kit

Official website
- warriorsrugby.com

The Utah Warriors were an American professional rugby union team based in the Salt Lake City metropolitan area, that competed in Major League Rugby (MLR). The team was founded in 2010 as the Utah Warriors of the Rugby Super League and re-founded in 2017 by Rugby Utah Ventures. On November 4, 2025, the team announced they had withdrawn from the 2026 Major League Rugby Season and suspended operations.

== Home field ==
The Utah Warriors played at Zions Bank Stadium in Herriman, Utah, which has a seating capacity of 5,000. The adjacent training facility includes two full-sized indoor turf fields. The Warriors shared the venue with Real Monarchs, an MLS Next Pro team affiliated with Real Salt Lake.

== Broadcasts ==
2019 home games were shown on KMYU, a CBS affiliate station owned by Sinclair Broadcast Group. Jarom Jordan and Jonny Linehan were the on-air talent.

== Sponsorship ==
Season	Kit manufacturer	Shirt sponsor
2018-2019	XBlades	Nui Social
2020–2021	Paladin Sports	None
2022	Paladin Sports	Intermountain Healthcare
2023	Paladin Sports	None

== Players and personnel ==
=== Head coaches ===
- (New Zealand) Alf Daniels (2018–2019)
- (Australia) Chris Latham (2020)
- (United States) Shawn Pittman (2021–2022)
- (New Zealand) Greg Cooper (2022–2025)

=== Captains ===
- Paul Lasike (2018)
- Tim O'Malley (2019)
- Dwayne Polataivao (2020)
- Bailey Wilson (2021–2025)

=== Honorary members ===
- Josh Pray (2019–2025)

== Records ==
=== Season standings ===
Season	Conference	Regular season										Postseason						
Season	Conference	Pos	Pld	W	D	L	F	A	+/−	BP	Pts	Pld	W	L	F	A	+/−	Result
2018	-	4th	8	3	0	5	269	274	–5	10	22	1	0	1	21	34	-13	Lost Semifinal (Glendale Raptors) 21–34
2019	-	8th	16	2	2	12	381	517	−136	9	21	-	-	-	-	-	-	Did not qualify
2020 (Note: 2020 regular season shortened and playoffs cancelled due to the COVID-19 pandemic.)	Western	2nd	5	2	1	2	125	134	-9	2	12	-	-	-	-	-	-	Cancelled
2021	Western	2nd	16	10	0	6	506	464	+42	17	57	1	0	1	13	17	-4	Lost West Conference Final (LA Giltinis) 13-17
2022	Western	6th	16	5	0	11	424	395	+29	6	33	-	-	-	-	-	-	Did not qualify
2023	Western	4th	16	10	0	6	445	421	+24	10	50	-	-	-	-	-	-	Did not qualify
2024	Western	5th	16	5	0	11	424	471	-47	15	35	-	-	-	-	-	-	Did not qualify
2025	Western	1st	16	11	0	5	529	443	+86	14	58	2	1	1	42	54	-12	Won West Conference Eliminator (Seattle Seawolves) 23-21; Lost West Conference Final (Houston SaberCats) 33-19
Totals			109	48	3	58	3,079	3,119	-40	83	288	4	1	3	76	105	-29	3 postseason appearances

=== Honors ===
- Major League Rugby
  - Playoff appearances: 2018, 2021

== 2018 season ==
Date	Opponent	Home/Away	Venue	Location	Result
March 30	Glendale Raptors°	Home	Rio Tinto Stadium	Sandy, Utah	Lost, 42–15
April 6	Ontario Arrows°	Home	Rio Tinto Stadium	Sandy, Utah	Lost, 24–20
April 20	Prairie Wolf Pack°	Home	Zions Bank Stadium	Herriman, Utah	Won, 80–12
April 29	San Diego Legion	Away	Torero Stadium	San Diego, California	Lost, 24–31
May 5	Glendale Raptors	Home	Zions Bank Stadium	Herriman, Utah	Lost, 29–36
May 11	Austin Elite	Home	Zions Bank Stadium	Herriman, Utah	Won, 41–22
May 20	Seattle Seawolves	Away	Starfire Stadium	Seattle, Washington	Lost, 30–41
May 26	Houston SaberCats	Away	Dyer Stadium	Houston, Texas	Won, 36–30
June 1	Austin Elite	Away	Round Rock Multipurpose Complex	Austin, Texas	Lost, 33–41
June 16	New Orleans Gold	Home	Zions Bank Stadium	Herriman, Utah	Lost, 43–46
June 23	Houston SaberCats	Home	Zions Bank Stadium	Herriman, Utah	Won, 31–27
June 30	Glendale Raptors°°	Away	Infinity Park	Glendale, Colorado	Lost, 21–34

° = Preseason game
°° = Playoff semifinal
Matches won are colored green

== 2019 season ==
=== Exhibition ===
Date	Opponent	Home/Away	Venue	Result
October 13, 2018	Glendale Raptors	Away	Infinity Park	Postponed
October 20, 2018	Glendale Raptors	Home		Postponed
January 12, 2019	Life West	Home	RSL Academy Indoor Field	Won, 25–10
February 9, 2019	New England Free Jacks	Home	Zions Bank Training Center	Won, 70–15

=== Regular season ===
Date	Opponent	Home/Away	Venue	Result
February 1	Austin Elite	Away	Dell Diamond	Win, 17–9
February 17	San Diego Legion	Away	Torero Stadium	Lost, 10–21
February 23	Glendale Raptors	Home	Zions Bank Stadium	Draw, 26–26
March 2	New Orleans Gold	Home	Zions Bank Stadium	Lost, 19–21
March 9	Rugby United New York	Home	Zions Bank Stadium	Lost, 21–47
March 23	Houston SaberCats	Away	Constellation Field	Lost, 27–29
March 30	Toronto Arrows	Home	Zions Bank Stadium	Lost, 31–64
April 5	Seattle Seawolves	Home	Zions Bank Stadium	Lost, 36–48
April 13	New Orleans Gold	Away	Gold Stadium	Lost, 19–28
April 20	Rugby United New York	Away	MCU Park	Lost, 22–24
April 27	Austin Elite	Home	Zions Bank Stadium	Won, 35–19
May 4	Glendale Raptors	Away	Infinity Park	Lost, 22–64
May 12	Toronto Arrows	Away	York Stadium	Lost, 21–28
May 18	San Diego Legion	Home	Zions Bank Stadium	Lost, 21–31
May 26	Seattle Seawolves	Away	Starfire Sports	Draw, 27–27
June 1	Houston SaberCats	Home	Zions Bank Stadium	Lost, 27–31

== 2020 season ==
On March 12, 2020, MLR announced the season would go on hiatus immediately for 30 days due to the COVID-19 pandemic. It was cancelled the following week.

=== Regular season ===
Date	Opponent	Home/Away	Result
February 9	Rugby ATL	Away	Lost, 19–28
February 15	New England Free Jacks	Home	Won, 39–33
February 22	Austin Gilgronis	Away	Draw, 20–20
February 29	Colorado Raptors	Away	Lost, 14–22
March 7	Seattle Seawolves	Away	Won, 33–31
March 13	New Orleans Gold	Home	Cancelled
March 27	San Diego Legion	Home	Cancelled
April 4	Toronto Arrows	Away	Cancelled
April 11	Houston SaberCats	Away	Cancelled
April 18	Austin Gilgronis	Home	Cancelled
April 25	Seattle Seawolves	Home	Cancelled
May 3	Old Glory DC	Away	Cancelled
May 8	Colorado Raptors	Home	Cancelled
May 16	Rugby United New York	Home	Cancelled
May 25	San Diego Legion	Away	Cancelled
May 30	Houston SaberCats	Home	Cancelled

== 2021 season ==
=== Regular season ===
Date	Opponent	Home/Away	Result
March 20	Austin Gilgronis	Away	Won, 30–28
March 27	Toronto Arrows	Home	Won, 39–24
April 3	New England Free Jacks	Away	Lost, 21–22
April 10	Seattle Seawolves	Home	Lost, 15–20
April 17	San Diego Legion	Away	Lost 29-31
April 24	Houston SaberCats	Home	Won, 50-43
May 8	Old Glory DC	Home	Won, 34-33
May 15	LA Giltinis	Away	Lost, 27-38
May 22	New Orleans Gold	Away	Lost, 29-24
May 29	Austin Gilgronis	Home	Won, 45-24
June 6	Seattle Seawolves	Away	Won, 29-28
June 12	San Diego Legion	Home	Won, 45-41
June 19	Rugby United New York	Away	Won, 29-28
June 26	Houston SaberCats	Away	Won, 24-5
July 10	Rugby ATL	Home	Lost, 31-41
July 17	LA Giltinis	Home	Won, 34-29

=== Postseason ===
Date	Opponent	Home/Away	Result
July 25	LA Giltinis	Away	Lost, 13-17

== 2022 season ==
=== Regular season ===
Date	Opponent	Home/Away	Result
February 6	San Diego Legion	Away	Lost, 31-29
February 10	Seattle Seawolves	Away	Lost, 17-20
February 19	Austin Gilgronis	Away	Lost, 10-24
March 5	Dallas Jackals	Home	Won, 69-22
March 13	LA Giltinis	Away	Won, 28-19
March 19	Toronto Arrows	Home	Lost, 24-27
March 26	Houston SaberCats	Home	Lost, 12-28
April 1	San Diego Legion	Home	Lost, 25-40
April 15	Old Glory DC	Away	Lost, 21-22
April 23	Seattle Seawolves	Home	Lost, 14-20
April 30	New England Free Jacks	Away	Lost, 17-33
May 7	Rugby ATL	Home	Won, 44-26
May 14	Houston SaberCats	Away	Lost, 27-31
May 21	Austin Gilgronis	Home	Won, 22-8
May 28	LA Giltinis	Home	Lost, 32-39
June 4	Dallas Jackals	Away	Won, 33-5

== 2023 season ==
=== Regular season ===
Date	Opponent	Home/Away	Result
February 19	San Diego Legion	Away	Lost, 17-33
February 25	Dallas Jackals	Home	Won, 33-25
March 5	Chicago Hounds	Away	Won, 14-10
March 18	NOLA Gold	Away	Lost, 37-14

== See also ==
- Utah Warriors (Rugby Super League) – defunct rugby union team of the same name that played nationally in the United States in 2011.
