= Houston SaberCats =

Professional rugby union team from Houston, Texas

(United States) Houston SaberCats
- Full name: Houston SaberCats
- Founded: 2017; 9 years ago
- Disbanded: 2025; 1 year ago
- Location: Houston, Texas
- Ground: SaberCats Stadium (Capacity: 4,000)
- President: Mike Sheehan
- Most caps: Keni Nasoqeqe (63)
- Top scorer: Sam Windsor (432)
- Most tries: Christian Dyer (19)
- League: Major League Rugby
- 2025: Western Conference: 2nd Playoffs: Runners-up
Team kit

Official website
- www.houstonsabercats.com

The Houston SaberCats were an American professional rugby union team based in Houston, Texas, that competes in Major League Rugby (MLR). The team was founded in 2017. The SaberCats organization was born from one of the founding amateur rugby clubs that pooled resources to emerge professionally, and were the first in MLR membership to build a rugby-specific stadium intended for MLR competition. The team announced on 11 September 2025 that it would not be fielding a team for the 2026 Major League Rugby season.

== Home field ==
Houston played their games in SaberCats Stadium, which was opened on April 13, 2019. In February 2018, the City of Houston agreed to fund $3.2 million of the $15.25 million needed to build a permanent rugby stadium for use by the Houston SaberCats at Houston Sports Park. On July 17, the SaberCats announced that a three-year naming rights were awarded to British multinational software and technology company Aveva, and that it would be initially known as "Aveva Stadium". Following this deal, the venue became known as "SaberCats Stadium".

Houston Sports Park is also the permanent training ground for Major League Soccer soccer team Houston Dynamo as well as the Houston Dash women's soccer team.

During the 2018 regular season, the SaberCats played their home matches at Dyer Stadium and trained at Athlete Training and Health in Houston. The team also played at Constellation Field, home of the Sugar Land Skeeters, for part of the 2019 season, and for their exhibition matches in 2017 and 2018. Also, in April 2019, while the new pitch at SaberCats Stadium healed, the team returned to Dyer Stadium to play one match against San Diego before returning to SaberCats Stadium.

Stadium	Capacity	Location	Year(s)
Dyer Stadium	6,000	Houston, Texas	2018
Constellation Field	7,500	Sugar Land, Texas	2018–2019
SaberCats Stadium	4,000	Houston, Texas	2019–2025

== Broadcasts ==
- 2019 home games were shown on KUBE-TV an independent station in Houston.

== Sponsorship ==
Season	Kit manufacturer	Shirt sponsor	Other Shirt sponsor(s)
2018–2019	XBlades	Aveva	None
2020	Paladin Sports	Aveva	None
2021	Paladin Sports	Aveva	Lone Star College System
2022	Paladin Sports	Live Oak Vodka	None
2023	Paladin Sports	Live Oak Vodka	None

== Players and personnel ==
=== Head coaches ===
- (Ireland) Justin Fitzpatrick (2017–2019)
- (United States) Paul Emerick (2019)
- (Australia) Paul Healy (2020–2021)
- (South Africa) Pote Human (2022–Present)

=== Former assistant coaches ===
- (Australia) Sam Windsor (Backs – 2017–2019)
- (United States) Paul Emerick (Backs – 2017–2020)
- (Australia) Matt Trouville (Lineouts – 2017–2019)
- (England) Neil Kelly (Defense – 2019)
- (Wales) Darren Morris (Forwards – 2019)

=== Captains ===
- Kyle Sumsion (2018)
- Matt Trouville (2019)
- De Wet Roos (2020)
- Luke Beauchamp (2021) (co-captain)
- De Wet Roos (2021) (co-captain)
- Dean Muir (2022–)

== Records ==
=== Season standings ===
Season	Conference	Regular season										Postseason						
Season	Conference	Pos	Pld	W	D	L	F	A	+/−	BP	Pts	Pld	W	L	F	A	+/−	Result
2018	-	7th	8	1	0	7	216	256	−40	7	11	-	-	-	-	-	-	Did not qualify
2019	-	7th	16	6	0	10	345	496	−151	6	30	-	-	-	-	-	-	Did not qualify
2020 (Note: 2020 regular season shortened and playoffs cancelled due to the COVID-19 pandemic.)	Western	6th	5	1	0	4	99	116	−17	2	6	-	-	-	-	-	-	Cancelled
2021	Western	6th	16	2	0	14	274	550	-276	5	13	-	-	-	-	-	-	Did not qualify
2022	Western	3rd	16	9	0	7	408	393	+15	12	48	1	0	1	27	46	-19	Lost West Conference Final (Seattle Seawolves) 27–46
2023	Western	3rd	16	10	0	6	484	413	+71	13	53	1	0	1	26	37	-11	Lost West Conference Eliminator Game (Seattle Seawolves) 26-37
2024	Western	1st	16	14	0	2	478	347	+131	11	67	1	0	1	22	34	-12	Lost West Conference Eliminator Game (Dallas Jackals) 22-34
2025	Western	2nd	16	10	0	6	458	365	+93	14	54	3	2	1	82	68	+14	Won West Conference Eliminator Game (RFC Los Angeles) 27-21; Won West Conference Final (Utah Warriors) 33-19; Lost MLR Championship Final (New England Free Jacks) 28-22
Totals			109	53	0	56	2,762	2,936	-174	70	282	6	2	4	157	185	-28	4 postseason appearances

== Honors ==
Major League Rugby
Playoff Appearances	Conference Championships	Major League Rugby Championships
2022, 2023, 2024, 2025	2025	

== 2018 season ==
=== Exhibition ===
Date	Opponent	Home/Away	Result
November 18, 2017	Dallas Reds	Away	Won, 31–24
December 2, 2017	Dallas Harlequins	Away	Won, 125–0
December 9, 2017	Austin Blacks	Away	Won, 46–31
December 9, 2017	Austin Blacks	Away	Won, 55–14
December 16, 2017	Dallas Reds	Home	Won, 21–5
January 6, 2018	Seattle Saracens	Away	Won, 50–7
January 13, 2018	Vancouver Ravens	Away	Lost, 23–26
January 20, 2018	Uruguay National Team	Home	Lost, 24–32
January 27, 2018	James Bay Athletic Club	Home	Won, 42–13
February 3, 2018	Capital Selects	Home	Won, 49–3
February 10, 2018	Chicago Lions	Home	Won, 60–10
February 17, 2018	New York Athletic Club	Away	Won, 39–38
February 24, 2018	New Orleans Gold	Home	Won, 30–12
March 3, 2018	Ontario Arrows	Home	Draw, 28–28
March 24, 2018	New Orleans Gold	Away	Draw, 32–32
April 7, 2018	San Diego Legion	Away	Won, 33–17

=== Regular season ===
Date	Opponent	Home/Away	Result
April 21	New Orleans Gold	Home	Lost, 26–35
April 28	Austin Elite	Home	Won, 50–38
May 4	San Diego Legion	Away	Lost, 32–35
May 19	New Orleans Gold	Away	Lost, 26–35
May 26	Utah Warriors	Home	Lost, 30–36
June 2	Seattle Seawolves	Home	Lost, 7–20
June 9	Glendale Raptors	Away	Lost, 24–37
June 23	Utah Warriors	Away	Lost, 27–31

== 2019 season ==
=== Exhibition ===
Date	Opponent	Home/Away	Result
December 1, 2018	Austin Blacks	Away	Won, 78–12
December 8, 2018	Dallas Reds	Away	Won, 34–8
January 11, 2019	Austin Elite	Home	Lost, 10–14
January 19, 2019	Glendale Raptors	Home	Lost, 21–36

=== Regular season ===
Date	Opponent	Home/Away	Venue	Result
January 26	Austin Elite	Away	Dell Diamond	Won, 21–20
February 9	San Diego Legion	Away	Torero Stadium	Lost, 13–17
February 22	Toronto Arrows	Home	Constellation Field	Lost, 27–44
March 2	Rugby United New York	Home	Constellation Field	Lost, 8–35
March 10	Seattle Seawolves	Away	Starfire Sports	Lost, 14–27
March 16	New Orleans Gold	Home	Constellation Field	Lost, 11–49
March 23	Utah Warriors	Home	Constellation Field	Won, 29–27
April 6	Glendale Raptors	Away	Infinity Park	Lost, 44–52
April 13	Seattle Seawolves	Home	Aveva Stadium	Lost, 12–52
April 21	Toronto Arrows	Away	York Stadium	Lost, 21–35
April 27	San Diego Legion	Home	Dyer Stadium	Lost, 19–41
May 5	Rugby United New York	Away	MCU Park	Lost, 0–21
May 18	New Orleans Gold	Away	Archbishop Shaw Stadium	Won, 27–20
May 25	Austin Elite	Home	Aveva Stadium	Won, 36–15
May 29	Glendale Raptors	Home	Aveva Stadium	Won, 32–17
June 1	Utah Warriors	Away	Zions Bank Stadium	Won, 31–27

== 2020 season ==
On March 12, 2020, MLR announced the season would go on hiatus immediately for 30 days due to fears surrounding the 2019–2020 coronavirus pandemic. It was cancelled the following week

=== Regular season ===
Date	Opponent	Home/Away	Location	Result
February 8	Colorado Raptors	Home	Aveva Stadium	Won, 21–12
February 16	Toronto Arrows	Neutral	Las Vegas Ballpark	Lost, 22–27
February 22	Old Glory DC	Home	Aveva Stadium	Lost, 13–22
March 1	Rugby United New York	Home	Aveva Stadium	Lost, 23–31
March 7	Austin Gilgronis	Home	Aveva Stadium	Lost, 20–24
March 14	New England Free Jacks	Away	Union Point Sports Complex	Cancelled
March 21	Seattle Seawolves	Away	Starfire Stadium	Cancelled
April 5	San Diego Legion	Away	Torero Stadium	Cancelled
April 11	Utah Warriors	Home	Aveva Stadium	Cancelled
April 18	Colorado Raptors	Away	Infinity Park	Cancelled
April 26	Austin Gilgronis	Away	Round Rock Multipurpose Complex	Cancelled
May 2	Seattle Seawolves	Home	Aveva Stadium	Cancelled
May 9	New Orleans Gold	Away	Gold Mine	Cancelled
May 16	San Diego Legion	Home	Aveva Stadium	Cancelled
May 23	Rugby ATL	Home	Aveva Stadium	Cancelled
May 30	Utah Warriors	Away	Zions Bank Stadium	Cancelled

== 2021 season ==
=== Regular season ===
Date	Opponent	Home/Away	Result
March 20	Seattle Seawolves	Home	Won, 30–24
March 27	New England Free Jacks	Home	Lost, 0–32
April 3	Austin Gilgronis	Away	Lost, 0–26
April 10	San Diego Legion	Home	Won, 34–32
April 17	LA Giltinis	Home	Lost, 48–33
April 24	Utah Warriors	Away	Lost, 50–43
May 8	New Orleans Gold	Away	Lost, 26–28
May 15	Toronto Arrows	Home	Lost, 10–19
May 22	Old Glory DC	Home	Lost, 13–21
May 29	San Diego Legion	Away	Lost, 11–39
June 5	Austin Gilgronis	Home	Lost, 9–28
June 13	LA Giltinis	Away	Lost, 5–52
June 19	Rugby ATL	Away	Lost, 15–33
June 26	Utah Warriors	Home	Lost, 5–24
July 10	Rugby United New York	Away	Lost, 19–54
July 15	Seattle Seawolves	Away	Lost, 21-40

== 2022 season ==
=== Regular season ===
Date	Opponent	Home/Away	Result
February 5	LA Giltinis	Home	Won, 21–11
February 12	Rugby New York	Home	Lost, 7-10
February 19	Dallas Jackals	Away	Won, 38–33
February 26	San Diego Legion	Home	Lost, 20-31
March 5	Rugby ATL	Away	Lost, 22-29
March 12	Seattle Seawolves	Home	Won 21-19
March 26	Utah Warriors	Away	Won, 28-12
April 3	Austin Gilgronis	Away	Lost, 5-45
April 9	Dallas Jackals	Home	Won, 31-6
April 16	LA Giltinis	Away	Lost, 12-17
April 23	Toronto Arrows	Home	Won, 29-17
May 8	San Diego Legion	Away	Won, 34-24
May 14	Utah Warriors	Home	Won, 31-27
May 21	Old Glory DC	Away	Won, 59-42
May 27	Seattle Seawolves	Away	Lost, 36-43
June 3	Austin Gilgronis	Home	Lost, 14-29

=== Postseason ===
Round	Date	Opponent	Home/Away	Result
West Conference Finals	June 18	Seattle Seawolves	Home	Lost, 27-46

== 2023 season ==
=== Regular season ===
Date	Opponent	Home/Away	Result
February 19	Dallas Jackals	Away	Won, 33-12
February 25	NOLA Gold	Home	Won, 35-14
March 5	San Diego Legion	Home	Won, 31-26
March 11	Seattle Seawolves	Away	Lost, 12-24
March 25	Rugby ATL	Home	Won, 40-28
April 2	Chicago Hounds	Away	Won, 38-21
April 8	Utah Warriors	Home	Lost, 24-30
April 15	Dallas Jackals	Home	Won, 33-21
April 23	New York Ironworkers	Away	Won, 34-27
April 30	San Diego Legion	Away	Lost, 16-29
May 13	Seattle Seawolves	Home	Lost, 17-34
May 20	Utah Warriors	Away	Lost, 28-34
May 27	Chicago Hounds	Home	Won, 40-33
June 3	Toronto Arrows	Away	Won, 48-26
June 9	Old Glory DC	Home	Won, 31-7
June 18	New England Free Jacks	Away	Lost, 24-47

=== Postseason ===
Round	Date	Opponent	Home/Away	Result
West Conference Eliminator Round	June 24	Seattle Seawolves	Away	Lost, 26-37

== 2024 season ==
=== Regular season ===
Date	Opponent	Home/Away	Location	Result
March 2	Utah Warriors	Home	SaberCats Stadium	Won, 22-15
March 10	Rugby Football Club Los Angeles	Away	Dignity Health Sports Park	Won, 27-12
March 16	Miami Sharks	Home	SaberCats Stadium	Won, 30-19
March 22	Seattle Seawolves	Away	Starfire Sports Complex	Won, 42-40
March 29	Dallas Jackals	Away	Choctaw Stadium	Won, 30-27
April 13	New England Free Jacks	Home	SaberCats Stadium	Lost, 47-35
April 20	Old Glory DC	Away	Maryland SoccerPlex	Won, 38-17
April 27	San Diego Legion	Home	SaberCats Stadium	Won, 33-0
May 4	Utah Warriors	Away	Zions Bank Stadium	Won, 29-24
May 10	Anthem RC	Away	American Legion Memorial Stadium	Won, 38-15
May 18	Chicago Hounds	Home	SaberCats Stadium	Won, 23-22
June 1	NOLA Gold	Away	The Gold Mine	Won, 21-7
June 8	Rugby Football Club Los Angeles	Home	SaberCats Stadium	Won, 29-12
June 15	Seattle Seawolves	Home	SaberCats Stadium	Won, 28-25
June 23	San Diego Legion	Away	Snapdragon Stadium	Lost, 37-24
June 29	Dallas Jackals	Away	SaberCats Stadium	Won, 29-28

=== Postseason ===
Round	Date	Opponent	Home/Away	Result
West Conference Semi-Final	July 20	Dallas Jackals	Home	Lost, 34-22
