= Seattle Seawolves =

Professional rugby union team from Seattle, Washington

- Founded: 2017; 9 years ago
- Location: Tukwila, Washington
- Ground: Starfire Sports (Capacity: 4,500)
- Coach: Allen Clarke
- Captain: Riekert Hattingh
- Most caps: JP Smith (106)
- Top scorer: AJ Alatimu (321)
- Most tries: Riekert Hattingh (48)
- League: Major League Rugby
- 2026: Semifinals; 2nd in MLR
1st kit	2nd kit

Official website
- seawolves.rugby

The Seattle Seawolves are an American professional rugby union team based in the Seattle metropolitan area that competes in Major League Rugby (MLR). The team was founded in 2017. The Seawolves won two MLR championships in 2018 and 2019, and lost in the 2022 final and 2024 final. They play home matches at the 4,000-seat main stadium at Starfire Sports in Tukwila, a suburb south of Seattle.

== History ==
The team was founded in 2017 by an investor group led by Adrian Balfour and Shane Skinner. The Seawolves won the inaugural MLR Grand Final in 2018, and defended the title in the 2019 Major League Rugby Championship. In the final on June 16, 2019, the Seattle Seawolves defeated San Diego Legion 26–23 at Torero Stadium on the campus of the University of San Diego.

The Seawolves hired Kees Lensing as their head coach for the 2020 season and started with a 1–4 record. The season was cancelled in March due to the COVID-19 pandemic and did not resume.

== Stadium ==
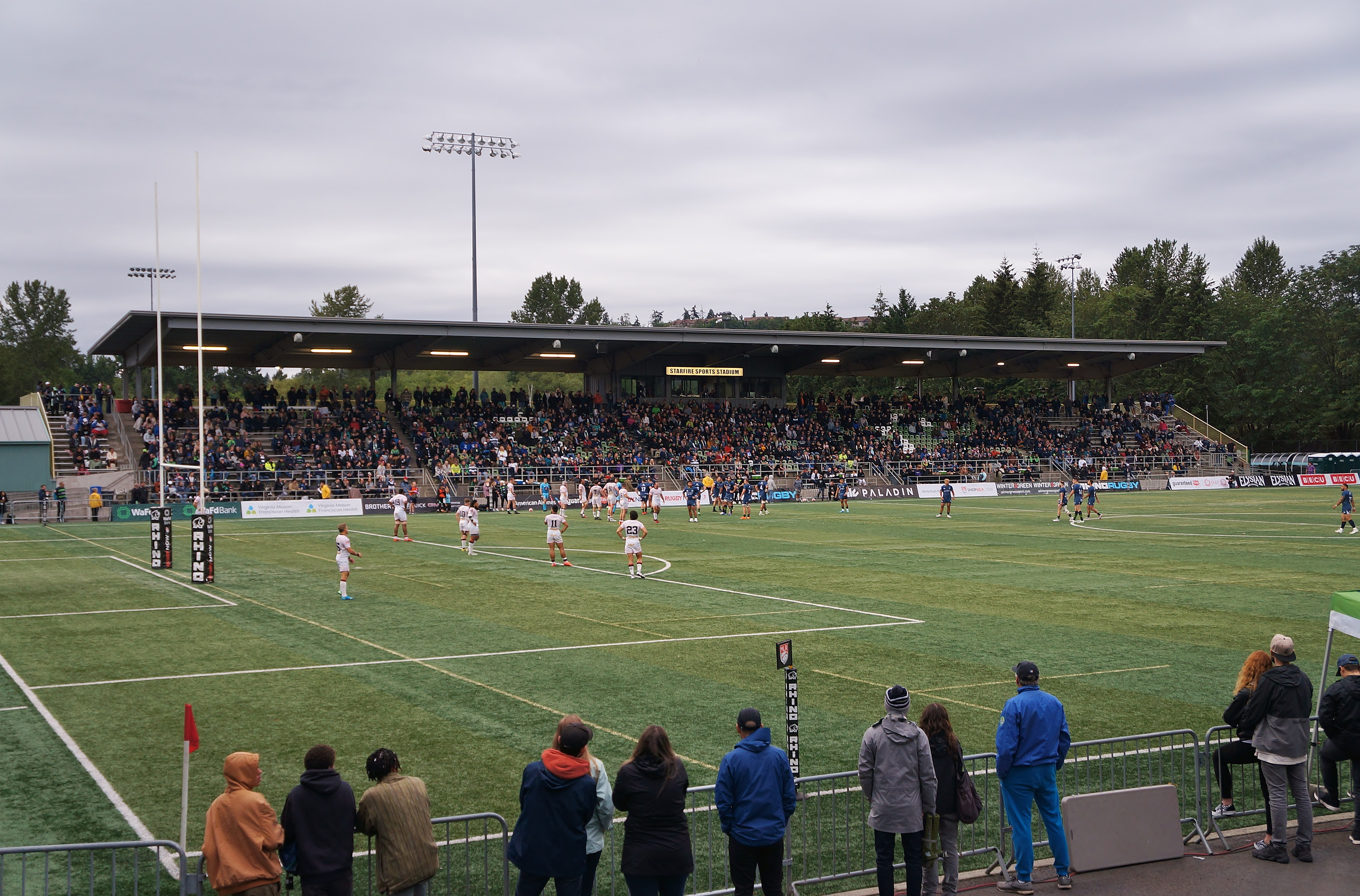
A Seawolves game at Starfire Sports in 2022

The Seattle Seawolves play at the main stadium at Starfire Sports, which has a seating capacity of 4,000, in the suburb of Tukwila. The team offered 1,800 season tickets for their inaugural season, which sold out before the first match. In 2024, Seawolves team president Tom Barden stated that the team was "in discussions" to move to the redeveloped Memorial Stadium on the Seattle Center campus. The stadium is planned to be rebuilt with 6,500 to 8,000 seats.

== Broadcasting ==
The local broadcast for the Seawolves has been carried on KONG and the streaming platform KING 5+ since 2026. Root Sports Northwest, a regional AT&T SportsNet affiliate, broadcast matches locally from 2019 to 2021. Dan Power and Kevin Swiryn were the on-air talent for the first season. For the 2024 season, national broadcasts were shown on Fox, FS1, and FS2; regional broadcasts were available on Root Sports and Fox 13+.

== Kit history ==
Home 2018–19	Away 2018	Away 2022–23	Home 2023–23

== Kit sponsorship ==
Season	Kit manufacturer	Shirt sponsor	Other Shirt sponsor(s)
2018–2019	XBlades	None	None
2020	Paladin Sports	Krusteaz	None
2021–2022	Paladin Sports	WaFd Bank	None
2023	Paladin Sports	WaFd Bank	Virginia Mason Franciscan Health; Tukwila; City of Tukwila USI Envorso
2024	Kappa	WaFd Bank	Virginia Mason Franciscan Health; Tukwila; City of Tukwila USI Envorso
2025	Macron	WaFd Bank	Virginia Mason Franciscan Health; Tukwila; City of Tukwila USI Envorso

== Players and personnel ==
=== Current squad ===
The Seattle Seawolves squad for the 2027 Major League Rugby season is:

2027 Seattle Seawolves squad
**Props**: (United States) Justus Tavai; **Hookers** **Locks**: (United States) **Rhyno Herbst**	**Back row**: (United States) Collin Grosse; **Scrum-halves**: (United States) Solomon Williams; **Fly-halves**: (South Africa) Davy Coetzer *	**Centres**: (Canada) **Nic Benn**; **Wings** **Fullbacks**
**(c)** denotes the team captain. **Bold** denotes internationally capped players. * denotes players qualified to play for United States on residency or dual nationality. Source:

=== Head coaches ===
- (Canada) Tony Healy (2018) did not take up post due to visa difficulties
- (Canada) Phil Mack (2018)
- (South Africa) Anton Moolman (2019) did not take up post due to visa difficulties
- (New Zealand) Richie Walker (2019)
- (Namibia) Kees Lensing (2020–April 2021)
- (United States) Pate Tuilevuka (May–June 2021)
- (Ireland) Allen Clarke (May 2021–)

=== Captains ===
- (United States) Riekert Hattingh (2018–present)

== Records ==
=== Season standings ===
Season	Conference	Regular season										Postseason						
Season	Conference	Pos	Pld	W	D	L	F	A	+/−	BP	Pts	Pld	W	L	F	A	+/−	Result
2018	—	2nd	8	6	0	2	232	188	+44	5	29	2	2	0	61	43	+18	Won Major League Rugby final (GLN)
2019	—	2nd	16	11	1	4	498	407	+91	12	58	2	2	0	56	40	+16	Won Major League Rugby final (SD)
2020 (Note: 2020 regular season shortened and playoffs cancelled due to the COVID-19 pandemic.)	Western	4th	5	1	0	4	138	162	-24	4	8	-	-	-	-	-	-	Cancelled
2021	Western	5th	16	4	0	12	343	461	-118	10	26	-	-	-	-	-	-	Did not qualify
2022	Western	4th	16	9	0	7	435	354	+73	6	46	3	2	1	104	76	+28	Lost Major League Rugby final (RNY)
2023	Western	2nd	16	12	0	4	509	348	+161	11	59	1	1	1	69	36	+33	Lost West Conference Final (SD)
2024	Western	2nd	16	11	0	5	498	373	+125	13	57	3	2	1	69	73	-4	Lost Major League Rugby final (NE)
2025	Western	4th	16	8	1	7	460	422	+38	15	49	1	0	1	21	23	-2	Lost West Conference Semifinal (UTA)
2026	-	2nd	10	6	0	4	311	308	+3	7	31	1	0	1	34	43	-9	Lost Semifinal (CAL)
Totals			119	68	2	49	3,424	2,836	+588	83	363	14	9	5	414	334	+80	7 postseason appearances

== Honors ==
- Major League Rugby
  - Champions: 2018, 2019
  - Playoff appearances: 2018, 2019, 2022, 2023, 2024
  - Western Conference Championship (playoffs): 2022, 2024

=== Players ===
Honor	Player Name	Season
MLR Player of the Year	Brad Tucker	2019
MLR Rookie of the Year	Tavite Lopeti	2022
S. Marcus Campbell Community Impact Award	Daniel Kriel	2023

== 2018 season ==
=== Regular season ===
Date	Opponent	Home/Away	Result
April 22	San Diego Legion	Home	Won, 39–23
April 28	Glendale Raptors	Home	Lost, 15–19
May 12	New Orleans Gold	Away	Won, 31–29
May 20	Utah Warriors	Home	Won, 41–32
May 27	New Orleans Gold	Home	Won, 55–26
June 2	Houston SaberCats	Away	Won, 20–7
June 8	Austin Elite	Away	Won, 20–19
June 16	Glendale Raptors	Away	Lost, 11–33

=== Postseason ===
Date	Opponent	Home/Away	Result
June 30	San Diego Legion	Home	Won, 38-24
June 16	Glendale Raptors	Neutral	Won, 23–19

== 2019 season ==
=== Exhibition ===
Date	Opponent	Home/Away	Result
December 22 (2018)	Crimson Tide	Away	Won, 48–7
January 5	SFGG	Away	Won, 45–0
January 17	Seattle Saracens	Home	Won, 74–3

=== Regular season ===
Date	Opponent	Home/Away	Result
January 27	Glendale Raptors	Home	Won, 20-18
February 2	San Diego Legion	Away	Lost, 13-17
February 10	New Orleans Gold	Away	Lost, 31-41
February 17	Toronto Arrows	Home	Won, 35–30
February 24	Rugby United New York	Home	Won, 33-21
March 10	Houston SaberCats	Home	Won, 27-14
March 16	Austin Elite	Away	Won, 29-17
March 31	San Diego Legion	Home	Lost, 22-28
April 5	Utah Warriors	Away	Won, 48-36
April 13	Houston SaberCats	Away	Won, 52–10
April 21	New Orleans Gold	Home	Won, 25–24
April 28	Toronto Arrows	Away	Lost, 7-29
May 11	Rugby United New York	Away	Won, 38-31
May 18	Glendale Raptors	Away	Won, 53-36
May 26	Utah Warriors	Home	Draw, 27-27
June 2	Austin Elite	Home	Won, 38–26

=== Postseason ===
Date	Opponent	Home/Away	Result
June 9	Toronto Arrows	Home	Won, 30-17
June 16	San Diego Legion	Away	Won, 26–23

== 2020 season ==
On March 12, 2020, MLR announced the season would go on hiatus immediately for 30 days due to the 2019–2020 coronavirus pandemic. It was cancelled the following week

=== Regular season ===
Date	Opponent	Home/Away	Result
February 9	San Diego Legion	Away	Lost, 24–33
February 16	Old Glory DC	Away	Lost, 22–28
February 22	Toronto Arrows	Home	Lost, 17–39
February 29	New England Free Jacks	Home	Won, 44–29
March 7	Utah Warriors	Home	Lost, 31–33
March 15	Rugby United New York	Away	Cancelled
March 21	Houston SaberCats	Home	Cancelled
March 29	Colorado Raptors	Home	Cancelled
April 4	Austin Gilgronis	Away	Cancelled
April 12	San Diego Legion	Home	Cancelled
April 25	Utah Warriors	Away	Cancelled
May 2	Houston SabreCats	Away	Cancelled
May 10	Rugby ATL	Away	Cancelled
May 17	New Orleans Gold	Home	Cancelled
May 24	Colorado Raptors	Away	Cancelled
May 31	Austin Gilgronis	Home	Cancelled

== 2021 season ==
=== Regular season ===
Date	Opponent	Home/Away	Result
March 20	Houston SaberCats	Away	Lost, 24–30
March 28	LA Giltinis	Away	Lost, 26–57
April 10	Utah Warriors	Away	Won, 20–15
April 17	Toronto Arrows	Away	Lost, 7-52
April 25	Austin Gilgronis	Away	Lost, 15-42
May 2	Rugby United New York	Home	Lost, 23-21
May 9	San Diego Legion	Home	Won, 21-15
May 16	Old Glory DC	Away	Lost, 18-22
May 23	Rugby ATL	Home	Lost, 6-25
June 6	Utah Warriors	Home	Lost, 28-29
June 13	New England Free Jacks	Away	Lost, 21-25
June 20	Austin Gilgronis	Home	Lost, 31-36
June 27	LA Giltinis	Home	Lost, 14-29
July 3	San Diego Legion	Away	Lost, 21-34
July 11	New Orleans Gold	Home	Won, 30-6
July 15	Houston SaberCats	Home	Won, 40-21

== 2022 season ==
=== Exhibition ===
Date	Opponent	Home/Away	Result
January 22	Seattle Rugby Club	Home	Won, 76-8
January 28	Hartford Harpooners	Home	Won, 50-0

=== Regular season ===
Date	Opponent	Home/Away	Result
February 6	Toronto Arrows	Home	Won, 21-8
February 10	Utah Warriors	Home	Won, 20-17
February 20	San Diego Legion	Away	Won, 31-28
February 26	Austin Gilgronis	Home	Lost, 25-18
March 4	New Orleans Gold	Home	Lost, 25-24
March 12	Houston SaberCats	Away	Lost, 21-19
March 19	Dallas Jackals	Away	Won, 34-12
March 26	LA Giltinis	Home	Lost, 12-31
April 9	New England Free Jacks	Away	Lost, 22-24
April 16	San Diego Legion	Home	Won, 34-32
April 23	Utah Warriors	Away	Won, 20-14
May 1	Austin Gilgronis	Away	Lost, 6-17
May 8	Dallas Jackals	Home	Won, 74-7
May 15	Rugby United NY	Away	Lost, 22-30
May 27	Houston SaberCats	Home	Won, 43-36
June 5	LA Giltinis	Away	Won, 35-27

=== Postseason ===
Round	Date	Opponent	Home/Away	Result
West Eliminator	June 12	San Diego Legion	Home	Won, 43–19
West Conference Finals	June 18	Houston SaberCats	Away	Won, 46–27
MLR Championship	June 25	Rugby United NY	Away	Lost, 15–30

== 2023 season ==
=== Exhibition ===
Date	Opponent	Home/Away	Result
February 5	American Raptors	Home	Won, 47-0
February 8	Seattle Rugby Club	Home	Won, 49-0

=== Regular season ===
Date	Opponent	Home/Away	Result
February 18	New York Ironworkers	Home	Won, 25-11
February 24	Rugby ATL	Home	Won, 28-22
March 4	Dallas Jackals	Away	Won, 35-10
March 11	Houston Sabercats	Home	Won, 24-12
March 24	Chicago Hounds	Away	Won, 27-5
April 2	New Orleans Gold	Away	Won, 36-35
April 8	San Diego Legion	Home	Lost, 20-23
April 14	Utah Warriors	Away	Lost, 35-41
April 22	Toronto Arrows	Away	Won, 36-27
April 28	Dallas Jackals	Home	Won, 61-19
May 13	Houston Sabercats	Away	Won, 34-17
May 20	Chicago Hounds	Home	Won, 35-13
May 27	Old Glory DC	Away	Won, 41-19
June 4	Utah Warriors	Home	Won, 27-20
June 11	New England Free Jacks	Home	Lost, 26-34
June 18	San Diego Legion	Away	Lost, 19-40

=== Post-Season ===
Round	Date	Opponent	Home/Away	Result
West Conference Playoff	June 24	Houston SaberCats	Home	Won, 37-26
West Conference Final	July 2	San Diego Legion	Away	Lost, 19–40

== 2024 season ==
=== Exhibition ===
Date	Opponent	Home/Away	Result
February 16	Pacific Pride	Home	Won, 79-7
February 21	Canada Selects	Home	Won, 54-7

=== Regular season ===
Date	Opponent	Home/Away	Result
March 2	San Diego Legion	Home	Won, 25–19
March 9	Miami Sharks	Home	Won, 29–18
March 16	Utah Warriors	Away	Won, 23–13
March 23	Houston SaberCats	Home	Lost, 40–42
March 30	Chicago Hounds	Away	Won, 32–26
April 6	Dallas Jackals	Home	Won, 34–32
April 13	RFC Los Angeles	Away	Won, 36–5
April 20	New England Free Jacks	Away	Won, 29–21
April 27	Anthem Rugby Carolina	Home	Won, 29–13
May 4	NOLA Gold	Away	Lost, 31–32
May 11	Dallas Jackals	Away	Lost, 7–14
May 18	Old Glory DC	Home	Won, 26–24
May 25	Utah Warriors	Home	Won, 68–29
June 1	Houston SaberCats	Away	Lost, 25–28
June 8	RFC Los Angeles	Home	Won, 29–12
June 15	San Diego Legion	Away	Lost, 33–45

=== Post-Season ===
Round	Date	Opponent	Home/Away	Result
West Conference Semi-Final	July 21	San Diego Legion	Home	Won, 30-28
West Conference Final	July 28	Dallas Jackals	Home	Won, 28-25
MLR Championship	August 4	New England Free Jacks	Away	Lost, 11–20
