= San Diego Legion =

Former Major League Rugby union team in San Diego, California

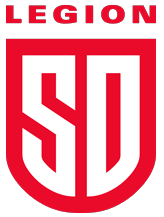
- Full name: San Diego Legion
- Founded: 2017; 9 years ago
- Disbanded: 30 July 2025; 13 months ago
- Location: San Diego, California
- Ground: Torero Stadium (Capacity: 6,000)
- President: David Haigh
- Most caps: Nathan Sylvia (90)
- Top scorer: Joe Pietersen (420)
- Most tries: Tomas Aoake (23)
- League: Major League Rugby
- 2025: Western Conference: 5th Playoffs: DNQ
1st kit	2nd kit

Official website
- www.sdlegion.com

The San Diego Legion were an American professional rugby union team based in San Diego, California, that competed in Major League Rugby (MLR) from 2020 to 2025. The team played its home games at Torero Stadium. The Legion began play in the league's inaugural 2018 season.

== History ==
Established in 2017, the San Diego Legion have represented San Diego since their inception. The Legion are one of seven founding teams in Major League Rugby. The Legion began play at Torero Stadium on the campus of the University of San Diego for the 2018 season.

On February 2, 2022, the Legion announced Snapdragon Stadium to be their new home beginning in 2023. On November 19, 2024, the team announced plans to leave Snapdragon Stadium to return to Torero Stadium. Playoff games may be hosted at Snapdragon Stadium depending on demand.

The Legion were runner-ups in the 2019 and 2023 season championships.

In July 2025 it was announced that San Diego Legion and Rugby Football Club Los Angeles would merge to form a single, statewide rugby franchise, the California Legion.

== Sponsorship ==
Season	Kit Manufacturer	Front of Jersey Sponsor
2018	XBlades	Sharp Business Systems
2019	XBlades	None
2020	Paladin Sports	None
2021–2022	Paladin Sports	Ballast Point Brewing Company
2023	Paladin Sports	Kings & Convicts Brewing Co.
2024	Kappa	Kings & Convicts Brewing Co.

== Players and personnel ==
=== Head coaches ===
- (England) Rob Hoadley (2018–2020)
- (United States) Zack Test (2020)
- (Scotland) Scott Murray (2020–2021)
- (New Zealand) Danny Lee (2022–2024)
- (Australia) John Manenti (2025)

=== Captains ===
- Nate Augspurger (2018)
- Joe Pietersen (2019)
- Nate Augspurger (2020–2025)

== Records ==
=== Season standings ===
Season	Conference	Regular season										Postseason						
Season	Conference	Pos	Pld	W	D	L	F	A	+/−	BP	Pts	Pld	W	L	F	A	+/−	Result
2018	-	3rd	8	5	0	3	214	201	+13	4	24	1	0	1	24	38	-14	Lost Semifinal (Seattle Seawolves) 24–38
2019	-	1st	16	12	1	3	457	296	+161	12	61	2	1	1	47	48	-1	Won Semifinal (Rugby United New York) 24–22; Lost Major League Rugby final (Seattle Seawolves) 23–26
2020 (Note: 2020 regular season shortened and playoffs cancelled due to the COVID-19 pandemic.)	Western	1st	5	5	0	0	161	108	+53	3	23	-	-	-	-	-	-	Cancelled
2021	Western	4th	16	6	0	10	430	464	-34	14	38	-	-	-	-	-	-	Did not qualify
2022	Western	5th	16	8	0	8	475	428	+47	8	43	1	0	1	19	43	-24	Lost West Conference Eliminator (Seattle Seawolves) 19–43
2023	Western	1st	16	15	0	1	554	285	+269	14	74	2	1	1	56	35	+21	Won Conference Final (Seattle Seawolves) 32–10; Lost Major League Rugby final New England Free Jacks 25–24
2024	Western	3rd	16	11	0	5	421	374	+47	11	55	1	0	1	28	38	-2	Lost West Conference Eliminator (Seattle Seawolves) 28–30
2025	Western	5th	16	8	0	8	490	429	+61	16	48	-	-	-	-	-	-	Did not qualify
Totals			109	70	1	38	2,902	2,485	+417	82	366	7	2	5	174	202	-28	5 playoff appearances

=== Honors ===
- Major League Rugby
  - Runner-up: 2019, 2023
  - Playoff appearances: 2018, 2019

== 2018 season ==
Date	Opponent	Home/Away	Result
March 25	Austin Elite°	Away	Won, 24–32
April 7	Houston SaberCats°	Home	Lost, 17–33
April 22	Seattle Seawolves	Away	Lost, 23–39
April 29	Utah Warriors	Home	Won, 31–24
May 4	Houston SaberCats	Home	Won, 35–32
May 13	Glendale Raptors	Away	Lost, 27–31
May 25	Austin Elite	Away	Lost, 5–31
June 9	New Orleans Gold	Away	Won, 39–22
June 17	Austin Elite	Home	Won, 31–17
June 23	Glendale Raptors	Home	Won, 23–5
June 30	Seattle Seawolves°°	Neutral	Lost, 24–38

° = Exhibition game
°° = Playoff semifinals at Infinity Park in Glendale, Colorado.

== 2019 season ==
=== Exhibition ===
Date	Opponent	Home/Away	Result
January 6	Life West	Away	Won, 76–0
January 13	Glendale Raptors	Home	Lost, 31–38

=== Regular season ===
Date	Opponent	Home/Away	Result
January 27	Rugby United New York	Home	Lost, 23–25
February 2	Seattle Seawolves	Home	Won, 17–13
February 9	Houston SaberCats	Home	Won, 17–13
February 17	Utah Warriors	Home	Won, 21–10
February 23	Austin Elite	Away	Won, 45–17
March 10	Toronto Arrows	Home	Lost, 20–27
March 16	Glendale Raptors	Away	Draw, 28-28
March 31	Seattle Seawolves	Away	Won, 28–22
April 7	Austin Elite	Home	Won, 45–15
April 14	Rugby United New York	Away	Won, 29–19
April 20	Glendale Raptors	Home	Won, 46–15
April 28	Houston SaberCats	Away	Won, 41–19
May 5	Toronto Arrows	Away	Lost, 19–23
May 11	New Orleans Gold	Away	Won, 26–19
May 18	Utah Warriors	Away	Won, 31–21
June 2	New Orleans Gold	Home	Won, 22–10

=== Postseason ===
Date	Opponent	Home/Away	Result
June 9	Rugby United New York	Home	Won, 24–22
June 16	Seattle Seawolves	Home	Lost, 23–26

== 2020 season ==
On March 12, 2020, MLR announced the season would go on hiatus immediately for 30 days due to fears surrounding the COVID-19 pandemic. It was canceled the following week

=== Regular season ===
Date	Opponent	Home/Away	Result
February 9	Seattle Seawolves	Home	Won, 33–24
February 16	Colorado Raptors	Home	Won, 49–22
February 23	New England Free Jacks	Home	Won, 30–21
February 29	New Orleans Gold	Away	Won, 25–21
March 8	Rugby United New York	Home	Won, 24–20
March 15	Austin Gilgronis	Away	Cancelled
March 22	Old Glory DC	Home	Cancelled
March 27	Utah Warriors	Away	Cancelled
April 5	Houston SaberCats	Home	Cancelled
April 12	Seattle Seawolves	Away	Cancelled
April 26	Rugby ATL	Away	Cancelled
May 3	Austin Gilgronis	Home	Cancelled
May 10	Toronto Arrows	Away	Cancelled
May 16	Houston SaberCats	Away	Cancelled
May 25	Utah Warriors	Home	Cancelled
May 30	Colorado Raptors	Away	Cancelled

== 2021 season ==
=== Regular season ===
Date	Opponent	Home/Away	Result
March 20	Rugby United New York	Home	Lost, 29–36
March 28	Austin Gilgronis	Away	Won, 14–11
April 3	Rugby ATL	Away	Lost, 22–41
April 10	Houston SaberCats	Away	Lost, 32–34
April 17	Utah Warriors	Home	Won, 31–29
April 24	LA Giltinis	Away	Lost, 17–45
May 1	New England Free Jacks	Home	Lost, 17–33
May 9	Seattle Seawolves	Away	Lost, 15–21
May 15	New Orleans Gold	Home	Won, 43–17
May 29	Houston SaberCats	Home	Won, 39–11
June 6	Toronto Arrows	Away	Won, 40–30
June 12	Utah Warriors	Away	Lost, 41–45
June 20	LA Giltinis	Home	Lost, 13–19
June 26	Austin Gilgronis	Home	Lost, 14–33
July 3	Seattle Seawolves	Home	Won, 34–21
July 10	Old Glory DC	Away	Lost, 38–29

== 2022 season ==
=== Regular season ===
Date	Opponent	Home/Away	Result
February 6	Utah Warriors	Home	Won, 39–21
February 12	Dallas Jackals	Home	Won, 37–29
February 20	Seattle Seawolves	Home	Lost, 28–31
February 26	Houston SaberCats	Away	Won, 31–20
March 6	Old Glory DC	Home	Won, 24–12
March 13	Rugby New York	Away	Lost, 23–26
March 19	LA Giltinis	Away	Lost, 13–26
April 1	Utah Warriors	Away	Won, 40–25
April 10	Austin Gilgronis	Home	Lost, 21–35
April 16	Seattle Seawolves	Away	Lost, 32–34
April 24	Rugby ATL	Home	Lost, 17–30
April 30	Dallas Jackals	Away	Won, 53–14
May 7	Houston SaberCats	Home	Lost, 24–34
May 14	LA Giltinis	Home	Won, 31–27
May 21	NOLA Gold	Awaay	Won, 42–12
May 28	Austin Gilgronis	Away	Lost, 28–44

=== Postseason ===
Round	Date	Opponent	Home/Away	Result
West Eliminator	June 12	Seattle Seawolves	Away	Lost, 19–43

== 2023 season ==
=== Regular season ===
Date	Opponent	Home/Away	Location	Result
February 18	Utah Warriors	Home	Snapdragon Stadium	Won, 33-17
February 26	New England Free Jacks	Home	Snapdragon Stadium	Won, 29-12
March 5	Houston SaberCats	Away	SaberCats Stadium	Lost, 31-26
March 11	Dallas Jackals	Home	Snapdragon Stadium	Won, 22-0
March 18	Rugby ATL	Away	Atlanta Silverbacks Park	Won, 35-10
April 2	Old Glory DC	Home	Snapdragon Stadium	Won, 48-26
April 8	Seattle Seawolves	Away	Starfire Sports Complex	Won, 23–20
April 16	Chicago Hounds	Home	Snapdragon Stadium	Won, 48–24
April 22	Dallas Jackals	Away	Choctaw Stadium	Won, 47–38
April 30	Houston SaberCats	Home	Snapdragon Stadium	Won, 29–16
May 6	Utah Warriors	Away	Zions Bank Stadium	Won, 26–16
May 13	NOLA Gold	Away	Gold Mine	Won, 26–12
May 28	Rugby New York Ironworkers	Home	Snapdragon Stadium	Won, 36–13
June 3	Chicago Hounds	Away	SeatGeek Stadium	Won, 36–14
June 11	Toronto Arrows	Away	York Lions Stadium	Won, 50–17
June 18	Seattle Seawolves	Home	Snapdragon Stadium	Won, 40–19

=== Postseason ===
Round	Date	Opponent	Location	Result
West Conference Finals	July 2, 2023	Seattle Seawolves	Snapdragon Stadium	Won, 32–10
MLR Grand Final	July 8, 2023	New England Free Jacks	SeatGeek Stadium	Lost, 25–24
