= 2019 Major League Rugby season =

Second season of Major League Rugby

- Countries: United States (8 teams); Canada (1 team)
- Date: January 26 – June 16
- Champions: Seattle Seawolves (2nd title)
- Runners-up: San Diego Legion
- Matches played: 75
- Attendance: 159,941 (average 2,133 per match)
- Highest attendance: 6,000; San Diego v Seattle (June 16, 2019)
- Lowest attendance: 578; Austin v San Diego (February 22, 2019)
- Top point scorer: Brock Staller (223)
- Top try scorer: John Ryberg & Dylan Fawsitt (13)

Official website
- www.usmlr.com

The 2019 Major League Rugby season was the second season of Major League Rugby, the professional rugby union competition sanctioned by USA Rugby. The regular season began on January 26 and concluded on June 2.

Two teams made their debut in 2019, the Toronto Arrows and Rugby United New York. The Seattle Seawolves won the championship for the second consecutive season, defeating the San Diego Legion 26-23 on June 16.

== Teams ==
| Team | Head coach | Captain | Stadium | Capacity |
|---|---|---|---|---|
| Austin Elite | (France) Alain Hyardet | (Ireland) Ben Mitchell | Dell Diamond | 11,500 |
| Glendale Raptors | (United States) David Williams | (United States) Shaun Davies | Infinity Park | 5,000 |
| Houston SaberCats | (Ireland) Justin Fitzpatrick (to May 2, 2019) (United States) Paul Emerick (interim from May 3, 2019) | (United States) Matt Trouville | Aveva Stadium; Constellation Field; Dyer Stadium (Note: The Houston SaberCats played their first four games of the 2019 season at Constellation Field in Sugar Land, Texas, home of the Sugar Land Skeeters in the Atlantic League of Professional Baseball. All remaining home games were planned to be played at Aveva Stadium, however due to the state of the turf after the first match there, the next home match was moved to Dyer Stadium. All home matches after that were played at AVEVA Stadium.) | 4,000; 7,500; 6,000 |
| New Orleans Gold | (Australia) Nate Osborne | (Canada) Eric Howard | Gold Stadium | 3,000 |
| Rugby United New York | (United States) Mike Tolkin | (United States) Mike Petri | MCU Park | 7,000 |
| San Diego Legion | (England) Rob Hoadley | (South Africa) Joe Pietersen | Torero Stadium | 6,000 |
| Seattle Seawolves | (New Zealand) Richie Walker (Canada) Phil Mack | (United States) Shalom Suniula | Starfire Stadium | 3,800 |
| Toronto Arrows | (Canada) Chris Silverthorn | (Canada) Dan Moor | Alumni Field; Lamport Stadium | 3,500; 9,600 |
| Utah Warriors | (New Zealand) Alf Daniels | (New Zealand) Tim O'Malley | Zions Bank Stadium | 5,000 |

== Regular season ==
The regular season was expanded from ten weeks in 2018 to nineteen weeks for 2019, with each team playing 16 matches.

=== Standings ===
The standings for the 2019 Major League Rugby regular season are:

| Pos | Team | Pld | W | D | L | PF | PA | PD | TB | LB | Pts |
|---|---|---|---|---|---|---|---|---|---|---|---|
| 1 | San Diego Legion | 16 | 12 | 1 | 3 | 457 | 296 | +161 | 8 | 3 | 61 |
| 2 | Seattle Seawolves | 16 | 11 | 1 | 4 | 498 | 405 | +93 | 10 | 2 | 58 |
| 3 | Toronto Arrows | 16 | 11 | 0 | 5 | 472 | 362 | +110 | 9 | 4 | 57 |
| 4 | Rugby United New York | 16 | 11 | 0 | 5 | 411 | 320 | +91 | 7 | 3 | 54 |
| 5 | New Orleans Gold | 16 | 9 | 0 | 7 | 463 | 403 | +60 | 11 | 6 | 53 |
| 6 | Glendale Raptors | 16 | 7 | 2 | 7 | 456 | 463 | −7 | 10 | 1 | 43 |
| 7 | Houston SaberCats | 16 | 6 | 0 | 10 | 343 | 498 | −155 | 5 | 1 | 30 |
| 8 | Utah Warriors | 16 | 2 | 2 | 12 | 381 | 517 | −136 | 4 | 5 | 21 |
| 9 | Austin Elite | 16 | 0 | 0 | 16 | 265 | 482 | −217 | 2 | 3 | 5 |

Updated to match(es) played on June 2, 2019. Source:
Rules for classification: Four points for a win, two for a draw, and no points for a bye. One bonus point for scoring four or more tries (TB). One bonus point for losing by seven or less (LB).

=== Matches ===
The following are the matches for the 2019 Major League Rugby regular season:

| Home \ Away | AUS | GLE | HOU | NOLA | RUNY | SAN | SEA | TOR | UTA |
|---|---|---|---|---|---|---|---|---|---|
| Austin Elite | | 13–24 | 20–21 | 14–26 | 11–19 | 17–45 | 17–29 | 19–23 | 9–17 |
| Glendale Raptors | 38–19 | | 52–44 | 34–33 | 20–16 | 28–28 | 36–53 | 22–0 | 62–22 |
| Houston SaberCats | 36–15 | 32–17 | | 11–49 | 8–35 | 19–40 | 10–52 | 27–44 | 29–27 |
| New Orleans Gold | 35–31 | 40–31 | 20–27 | | 24–27 | 19–26 | 41–31 | 36–31 | 28–19 |
| Rugby United NY | 27–7 | 31–19 | 21–0 | 24–22 | | 31–38 | 19–29 | 24–21 | 24–22 |
| San Diego Legion | 45–15 | 46–15 | 17–13 | 22–10 | 23–25 | | 17–13 | 20–27 | 21–10 |
| Seattle Seawolves | 38–26 | 20–18 | 27–14 | 25–24 | 33–21 | 22–28 | | 35–30 | 27–27 |
| Toronto Arrows | 24–13 | 40–12 | 35–21 | 31–35 | 22–20 | 23–19 | 29–7 | | 28–21 |
| Utah Warriors | 35–19 | 26–26 | 27–31 | 19–21 | 21–47 | 21–31 | 36–48 | 31–64 | |

Legend: Blue = home team win; Yellow = draw; Red = away team win.

==== Week 1 ====
| Jan 26 | NOLA Gold | 36–31 | Toronto Arrows | Gold Stadium |
| 14:00 CST | Try: Scott Gale 2'; Tim Maupin 26'; Eric Howard 35'; Con Foley 37'; JP Eloff 68'; Tristan Blewett 73'; Con: JP Eloff (2/4) 3', 36'; Scott Gale (1/2) 69'; Cards: Tim Maupin (yellow card) 71' to 81' | ARN Report | Try: John Moonlight 23'; Dan Moor 45', 58'; Penalty Try 71'; Avery Oitomen 76'; Con: Sam Malcolm (2/4) 24', 46'; Cards: Jack Evans (yellow card) 32' to 42' | Attendance: 1,500; Referee: Scott Green (USAR) |

| Jan 26 | Austin Elite | 20–21 | Houston SaberCats | Dell Diamond |
| 19:00 CST | Try: Chris Schade 12'; Josh Larsen 59'; Con: Mickaël Romera (1/1) 13'; Timothée Guillimin (1/1) 60'; Pen: Mickaël Romera (1/2) 40'; Timothée Guillimin (1/1) 73'; Cards: Peni Tagive (yellow card) 48' to 58' | ARN Report | Pen: Sam Windsor (7/7) 2', 8', 16', 34', 52', 67', 79'; Cards: Jamie Dever (yellow card) 55' to 65' | Attendance: 1,604; Referee: Derek Summers (USAR) |

| Jan 27 | San Diego Legion | 23–25 | RUNY | Torero Stadium |
| 14:00 PST | Try: Nick Boyer 37'; Joe Pietersen 71'; Con: Joe Pietersen (2/2) 38', 72'; Pen: Joe Pietersen (3/3) 44', 50', 61'; Cards: Chris Turori (yellow card) 30' to 40'; Sione Tu'ihalamaka (yellow card) 75' to 80' | ARN Report | Try: Chris Mattina 9'; Connor Wallace-Sims 23'; Penalty Try 75'; Con: Cathal Marsh (1/2) 10'; Pen: Cathal Marsh (2/2) 35', 63'; Cards: Matt Hughston (yellow card) 61' to 71' | Attendance: 2,900; Referee: Paul-Henri Courbier (FFR) |

| Jan 27 | Seattle Seawolves | 20–18 | Glendale Raptors | Starfire Sports |
| 19:30 PST | Try: Tim Metcher 28'c Brock Staller 61'c Con: Brock Staller (2/2) 29', 62'; Pen: Brock Staller (2/3) 25', 74'; Drop: Mathew Turner (0/1) | ARN Report | Try: Dylan Taikato-Simpson 42'c John Ryberg 44'm Con: Will Magie (1/2) 43'; Pen: Will Magie (2/3) 24', 40' | Attendance: 3,700; Referee: Pali Deluca (UAR) |

Bye/s: Utah Warriors

==== Week 2 ====
| Feb 1 | Austin Elite | 9–17 | Utah Warriors | Dell Diamond |
| 19:00 CST | Pen: Timothée Guillimin (3/6) 8', 11', 40' | ARN Report | Try: Awara Elkington 4' c Lance Williams 24' c Con: Tim O'Malley (2/2) 5', 25'; Pen: Tim O'Malley (1/1) 73'; Cards: Maikeli Naromaitoga (yellow card) 65' to 75'; Lance Williams (yellow card) 79' to 80' | Attendance: 1,000; Referee: Pali Deluca (UAR) |

| Feb 2 | NOLA Gold | 40–31 | Glendale Raptors | Gold Stadium |
| 14:00 CST | Try: Taylor Howden 9' c, 43' c Zach Stryffeler 22' m Scott Gale 65' m Tristan Blewett 68' c Con: JP Eloff (3/5) 10', 44', 69'; Pen: JP Eloff (3/3) 5', 28', 40' | ARN Report | Try: Will Munro 15' c, 58' m John Ryberg 33' m Luke White 54' c Brendan Daly 73' c Con: Robbie Petzer (2/4) 16', 55'; Dylan Takaito-Simpson (1/1) 74' | Attendance: 1,200; Referee: Luke Rogan (ARU) |

| Feb 2 | San Diego Legion | 17–13 | Seattle Seawolves | Torero Stadium |
| 14:00 PST | Try: Penalty try 27’ Mike Te'o 37’ c Con: Nick Boyer (1/1) 38’ Pen: Nick Boyer (1/2) 50’ | ARN Report | Try: Willy Rasileka 66’ c Con: Brock Staller (1/1) 67’ Pen: Brock Staller (2/2) 35’, 70’ Cards: Phil Mack (yellow card) 25' to 35' | Attendance: 1,100; Referee: Scott Green (USAR) |

Bye/s: Houston Sabercats, RUNY, Toronto Arrows

==== Week 3 ====
| Feb 8 | Austin Elite | 19–23 | Toronto Arrows | Dell Diamond |
| 19:00 CST | Try: Marcelo Torrealba 39' c Con: Timothée Guillimin (1/1) 40'; Pen: Timothée Guillimin (3/6) 21', 47', 58'; Mickaël Romera (1/1) 65'; Cards: Soheyl Jaoudat (yellow card) 10' to 20' | ARN Report | Try: Avery Oitomen 17' m Kolby Francis 52' c Dan Moor 74' m Con: Sam Malcolm (1/3) 53'; Pen: Sam Malcolm (2/3) 43', 55'; Cards: Sam Malcolm (yellow card) 23' to 33'; Rob Brouwer (yellow card) 31' to 41' | Referee: Paul-Henri Courbier (FFR) |

| Feb 9 | San Diego Legion | 17–13 | Houston Sabercats | Torero Stadium |
| 19:00 PST | Try: Keni Nasoqeqe 74' c Nate Augspurger 78' c Con: Joe Pietersen (2/2) 75', 79'; Pen: Joe Pietersen (1/1) 29' | ARN Report | Try: Josua Vici 10' c Con: Sam Windsor (1/1) 11'; Pen: Sam Windsor (2/2) 27', 31' | Referee: Pali Deluca (UAR) |

| Feb 10 | NOLA Gold | 41–31 | Seattle Seawolves | Gold Stadium |
| 15:00 CST | Try: Ignacio Dotti 33'; Penalty try 40' c Taylor Howden 48' c Tristan Blewett 69' c Joeli Tikoisuva 71' c Con: JP Eloff (4/4) 34', 49', 70', 72'; Pen: JP Eloff (2/2) 11', 42; Cards: Con Foley (yellow card) 18' to 28' | ARN Report | Try: Mat Turner 26' c Api Naikatni 59' c Kellen Gordon 64' c Riekert Hattingh 78' c Con: Brock Staller (4/4) 27', 60', 65', 79; Pen: Brock Staller (1/1) 3' | Attendance: 1,600; Referee: Derek Summers (USAR) |

Bye/s: Glendale Raptors, RUNY, Utah Warriors

==== Week 4 ====
| Feb 16 | NOLA Gold | 24–27 | RUNY | Gold Stadium |
| 14:00 CST | Try: Eric Howard 16' c Tony Lamborn 22' m, 53' c Joeli Tikoisuva 31' m Con: JP Eloff (2/4) 17', 54'; Pen: JP Eloff (0/1) | ARN Report | Try: Connor Wallace-Sims 25' c Cathal Marsh 36' c Dylan Fawsitt 63' c Con: Cathal Marsh (3/3) 26', 37', 64'; Pen: Cathal Marsh (2/2) 8', 72'; Cards: Dylan Fawsitt (yellow card) 52' to 62' | Attendance: 1,328; Referee: Paul-Henri Courbier (USAR) |

| Feb 17 | San Diego Legion | 21–10 | Utah Warriors | Torero Stadium |
| 14:00 PST | Try: JP du Plessis 18' c Devin Short 38' m Con: Joe Pietersen (1/2) 19'; Pen: Joe Pietersen (3/3) 22', 33', 73' | ARN Report | Try: Angus MacLellan 44' c Con: Tim O'Malley (1/1) 45'; Pen: Tim O'Malley (1/1) 28' | Referee: Luke Rogan (USAR) |

| Feb 17 | Austin Elite | 13–24 | Glendale Raptors | Dell Diamond |
| 18:00 CST | Try: Rikus Zwart 37' m Ben Mitchell 79' m Con: Andrés Vilaseca (0/1); Mickaël Romera (0/1); Pen: Andrés Vilaseca (1/1) 12' | ARN Report | Try: Ata Malifa 20' c Harley Davidson 30' m Carlo de Nysschen 46' c Peter Dahl 60' m Con: Carlo de Nysschen (2/3) 21', 47'; Robbie Petzer (0/1); Pen: Carlo de Nysschen (0/1) | Attendance: 774; Referee: Scott Green (USAR) |

| Feb 17 | Seattle Seawolves | 35–30 | Toronto Arrows | Starfire Sports |
| 17:00 PST | Try: Olive Kilifi 15' c Eric Duechle 29' c Shalom Suniula 58' c Ben Cima 65' m Con: Brock Staller (3/4) 16', 30', 59'; Pen: Brock Staller (3/4) 39', 72', 77'; Drop: Ben Cima 0/2 | ARN Report | Try: Marcello Wainwright 7' c Kolby Francis 25' c Andrew Ferguson 44' c Con: Sam Malcolm (3/3) 8', 26', 45'; Pen: Sam Malcolm (3/3) 32', 49', 52' | Attendance: 3,700; Referee: Ben Crouse (SARU) |

Bye/s: Houston Sabercats

==== Week 5 ====
| Feb 22 | Houston SaberCats | 27–44 | Toronto Arrows | Constellation Field |
| 19:00 CST | Try: Jamie Dever 35' c Kelly Kholberg 45' m Malacchi Esdale 51' m Sam Windsor 63' c Con: Sam Windsor (2/4) 36', 64'; Pen: Sam Windsor (1/2) 27' | ARN Report | Try: Johnny Sheridan 5' c Kolby Francis 31' c Avery Oitomen 40' c Spencer Jones 42' c Andrew Wilson 75' c Con: Sam Malcolm (5/5) 6', 32', 40', 43', 76'; Pen: Sam Malcolm (3/3) 15', 38', 56' | Attendance: 1,100; Referee: Paul-Henri Courbier (USAR) |

| Feb 22 | Austin Elite | 17–45 | San Diego Legion | Dell Diamond |
| 19:00 CST | Try: Ben Mitchell 37' c Josh Larsen 62' c Con: Mickaël Romera (1/1) 38'; Timothée Guillimin (1/1) 63'; Pen: Mickaël Romera (1/1) 7' | ARN Report | Try: JP du Plessis 4' c Dean Muir 23' c Devin Short 27' c Nate Augspurger 34' c Fakaʻosi Pifeleti 46' c Save Totovosau 70' c Con: Joe Pietersen (5/5) 5', 24', 28', 35', 47'; Dylan Audsley (1/1) 71'; Pen: Dylan Audsley (1/2) 69' | Attendance: 578; Referee: Moe Chaudhry (RC) |

| Feb 23 | Utah Warriors | 26–26 | Glendale Raptors | Zions Bank Stadium |
| 19:00 MST | Try: Awara Elkington 20'; Gannon Moore 42', 58'; Con: Tim O'Malley (1/3) 21'; Pen: Tim O'Malley (3/3) 12', 16', 35'; Cards: Josh Whippy (yellow card) 52' to 62' | ARN Report | Try: Harley Davidson 47'; John Ryberg 61', 71'; Chad Gaugh 67'; Con: Robbie Petzer (2/3) 62', 68'; Maximo de Achaval (1/1) 72' | Attendance: 2,139; Referee: Ben Crouse (SARU) |

| Feb 24 | Seattle Seawolves | 33–21 | RUNY | Starfire Sports |
| 16:00 PST | Try: Eric Duechle 7' c Stephan Coetzee 23' c Shalom Suniula 26' c Brock Staller 39' m, 57' c Con: Brock Staller (4/5) 8', 24', 27', 58' | ARN Report | Try: Will Leonard 11' c Ross Deacon 18' c Mike Brown 68' c Con: Cathal Marsh (3/3) 12', 19', 69' | Attendance: 3,700; Referee: Luke Rogan (USAR) |

Bye/s: NOLA Gold

==== Week 6 ====
| Mar 2 | Houston SaberCats | 8–35 | RUNY | Constellation Field |
| 19:00 CST | Try: Pat O'Toole 67' m Con: Sam Windsor (0/1); Pen: Sam Windsor (1/1) 21'; Cards: Luke Beauchamp (yellow card) 25' to 35'; Josua Vici (yellow card) 80' to 80' | ARN Report | Try: Dylan Fawsitt 13' c James Denise 27' c, 48' c Ben Foden 53' c Derek Lipscomb 80' c Con: Cathal Marsh (3/3) 14', 28', 49'; Chris Mattina (2/2) 54', 80' | Attendance: 950; Referee: Ben Crouse (SARU) |

| Mar 2 | Glendale Raptors | 22–0 | Toronto Arrows | Infinity Park |
| 18:00 MST | Try: Chad Gough 16' m Dylan Takaito-Simpson 36' m Harley Davidson 42' m Zach Fenoglio 78' c Con: Robbie Petzer (0/3); Carlo de Nysschen (1/1) 79'; Cards: Connor Cook (yellow card) 9' to 19' | ARN Report | Pen: Sam Malcolm (0/1) | Attendance: 1,015; Referee: Luke Rogan (USAR) |

| Mar 2 | Utah Warriors | 19–21 | NOLA Gold | Zions Bank Stadium |
| 19:00 MST | Try: Lance Williams 6' c Franco van den Berg 24' c Logan Daniels 59' m Con: Tim O'Malley (2/3) 7', 25'; Cards: Jeremy Misailegalu (yellow card) 37' to 47'; Lance Williams (yellow card) 78' to 80' | ARN Report | Try: Nick Feakes 27' m, 39' m, 79' m Con: JP Eloff (0/3); Pen: JP Eloff (2/2) 17', 20'; Cards: Kane Thompson (yellow card) 24' to 34' | Attendance: 1,584; Referee: Scott Green (USAR) |

Bye/s: Austin Elite, San Diego Legion, Seattle Seawolves

==== Week 7 ====
| Mar 8 | Utah Warriors | 21–47 | RUNY | Zions Bank Stadium |
| 19:00 MST | Try: John Cullen (2) 39' c, 80' c Josh Anderson 68' c Con: Tim O'Malley (3/3) 40', 69', 80'; Cards: Franco van den Berg (yellow card) 62' to 72' | ARN Report | Try: Connor Wallace-Sims (2) 7' c, 33' m Mark O'Keefe (2) 10' c, 78' c James Denise 26' c Penalty try 59'; Trevor Cassidy 63' c Con: Chris Mattina (5/6) 8', 11', 27', 64', 79' | Attendance: 1,145; Referee: Luke Rogan (USAR) |

| Mar 9 | Glendale Raptors | 38–19 | Austin Elite | Infinity Park |
| 18:00 MST | Try: John Ryberg 8' c Brendan Daly 17' c Harley Davidson 45' c Chad London 64' c Chad Gough 71' c Con: Robbie Petzer (5/5) 9', 18', 46', 65', 72'; Pen: Robbie Petzer (1/1) 40' | ARN Report | Try: Rodrigo Silva 21' m Moe Abdelmonem 50' c Sione Fangaiuiha 78' c Con: Mickaël Romera (1/2) 51'; Timothée Guillimin (1/1) 79' | Attendance: 1,000; Referee: Ben Crouse (SARU) |

| Mar 10 | Seattle Seawolves | 27–14 | Houston SaberCats | Starfire Sports |
| 17:00 PDT | Try: Jérémy Lenaerts 46' c Sequoyah Burke-Combs 72' c Eric Duechle 75' c Con: Brock Staller (3/3) 47', 73', 76'; Pen: Brock Staller (2/4) 3', 55' | ARN Report | Try: Osea Kolinisau 10' m Con: Sam Windsor (0/1); Pen: Sam Windsor (3/4) 24', 50', 69' | Attendance: 3,700; Referee: Paul-Henri Courbier (USAR) |

| Mar 10 | San Diego Legion | 20–27 | Toronto Arrows | Torero Stadium |
| 19:30 PDT | Try: Jordan Manihera 1' c Psalm Wooching 19' c Con: Joe Pietersen (2/2) 2', 20'; Pen: Joe Pietersen (1/1) 40'; Drop: Joe Pietersen (1/1) 42' | ARN Report | Try: Avery Oitomen (2) 51' c, 54' c Mike Sheppard 64' c Con: Sam Malcolm (3/3) 52', 55', 65'; Pen: Sam Malcolm (2/2) 15', 72' | Referee: Scott Green (USAR) |

Bye/s: NOLA Gold

==== Week 8 ====
| Mar 15 | RUNY | 24–21 | Toronto Arrows | MCU Park |
| 19:00 EDT | Try: Dylan Fawsitt (2) 13', 39'; Nate Brakeley 70'; John Quill 79'; Con: Chris Mattina (2/4) 14', 80' | ARN report | Try: Andrew Ferguson 26' m Giuseppe du Toit 46'; Con: Sam Malcolm (1/2) 47'; Pen: Sam Malcolm (3/3) 4', 10', 58' | Attendance: 3,000; Referee: Scott Green (USAR) |

| Mar 16 | Austin Elite | 17–29 | Seattle Seawolves | Dell Diamond |
| 18:00 CDT | Try: Tiaan Erasmus 3' c Soheyl Jaoudat 12' c Con: Mickaël Romera (2/2) 4', 13'; Pen: Mickaël Romera (1/1) 27'; Cards: Tiaan Erasmus (yellow card) 26' to 36'; Moe Abdelmonem (yellow card) 72' to 80' | ARN Report | Try: Riekert Hattingh (2) 20' c, 75' c Daniel Trierweiler 34' c Brad Tucker 65' m Con: Brock Staller (3/4) 21', 35', 76'; Pen: Brock Staller (1/1) 40' | Attendance: 604; Referee: Luke Rogan (USAR) |

| Mar 16 | Houston SaberCats | 11–49 | NOLA Gold | Constellation Field |
| 19:00 CDT | Try: Josua Vici 64' m Con: Sam Windsor (0/1); Pen: Sam Windsor (2/2) 14', 17'; Cards: Osea Kolinisau (red card) 71'; Josua Vici (red card) 71' | ARN Report | Try: Tristan Blewett (3) 20' c, 37' c, 48' c Eric Howard 23' c Kyle Baillie 40' c Jojo Tikoisuva 77' c JP Eloff 80' c Con: JP Eloff (7/7) 21', 24', 38', 40', 49', 78', 80'; Pen: JP Eloff (0/1); Drop: JP Eloff (0/1); Cards: Kevin Sullivan (yellow card) 74' to 80' | Attendance: 1,200; Referee: Ben Crouse (SARU) |

| Mar 16 | Glendale Raptors | 28–28 | San Diego Legion | Infinity Park |
| 18:00 MDT | Try: John Ryberg 13' c Mikaele Kruse 49' c Shaun Davies 53' c Harley Davidson 65' c Con: Will Magie (4/4) 14', 50', 54', 66'; Pen: Will Magie (0/1) | ARN Report | Try: Jordan Manihera 3' c Faka’osi Pifeleti 34' c Mike Te'o 56' c JP du Plessis 80' c Con: Joe Pietersen (4/4) 4', 35', 57', 80'; Cards: Keni Nasoqeqe (yellow card) 46' to 56' | Referee: Derek Summers (USAR) |

Bye/s: Utah Warriors

==== Week 9 ====
| Mar 21 | Houston SaberCats | 29–27 | Utah Warriors | Constellation Field |
| 19:30 CDT | Try: Zachary Pangelinan 13' c Pat O'Toole 16' c Con: Sam Windsor (2/2) 14', 17'; Pen: Sam Windsor (5/5) 4', 33', 51', 63', 75' | ARN Report | Try: Angus MacLellan 21' c Gannon Moore 39' c Lance Williams 78' c Con: Tim O'Malley (3/3) 22', 40', 79'; Pen: Tim O'Malley (2/2) 27', 49' | Attendance: 650; Referee: Scott Green (USAR) |

| Mar 23 | NOLA Gold | 35–31 | Austin Elite | Gold Stadium |
| 14:00 CDT | Try: Tim Maupin 8' c Holden Yungert 24' c Hubert Buydens 30' c Con Foley 47' c Michael Baska 79' c Con: JP Eloff (5/5) 9', 25', 31', 48', 80' | ARN Report | Try: Soheyl Jaoudat (2) 19' c, 67' m Ben Mitchell 40' m Rodrigo Silva 57' c Chris Schade 65' c Con: Mickaël Romera (2/3) 20', 58'; Andrés Vilaseca (1/2) 66' | Attendance: 1,455; Referee: Derek Summers (USAR) |

| Mar 24 | RUNY | 31–19 | Glendale Raptors | MCU Park |
| 14:00 EDT | Try: Mike St. Claire 7'; James Denise 29'; Dylan Fawsitt 29'; Mark O'Keeffe (2) 38', 52'; Con: Chris Mattina (3/5) 8', 23', 53'; Cards: James Denise (yellow card) 40' to 50' | ARN | Try: Dylan Taikato-Simpson 16'; Shaun Davies 42'; Robbie Petzer 65'; Con: Will Magie (2/3) 17', 66' | Attendance: 2,703; Referee: Ben Crouse (SARU) |

Bye/s: San Diego Legion, Seattle Seawolves, Toronto Arrows

==== Week 10 ====
| Mar 30 | Austin Elite | 11–19 | RUNY | Toyota Field |
| 13:00 CDT | Try: Reece Czarnecki 69' m Con: Juan Pablo Aguirre (0/1); Pen: Mickaël Romera (2/2) 30', 52' | ARN Report | Try: Marcus Walsh 21' m James Denise 60' c Mike Petri 73' c Con: Harry Bennett (0/1); Chris Mattina (2/2) 61', 74' | Attendance: 1,000; Referee: Luke Rogan (USAR) |

| Mar 30 | Glendale Raptors | 34–33 | NOLA Gold | Infinity Park |
| 18:00 CDT | Try: Chad Gough 12' c Shaun Davies 15' c Luke White 44' c Malon Al-Jiboori 60' c Con: Will Magie (3/3) 13', 16', 45'; Robbie Petzer (1/1) 61'; Pen: Will Magie (1/1) 3'; Robbie Petzer (1/1) 80'; Cards: Zach Fenoglio (yellow card) 76' to 80' | ARN Report | Try: Nikola Bursic 25' c Eric Howard (2) 29' c, 77' c Tim Maupin 35' c Cam Falcon 71' m Con: JP Eloff (4/5) 26', 30', 36', 78'; Cards: Ignacio Dotti (yellow card) 80' to 80' | Attendance: 1,100; Referee: Paul-Henri Courbier (USAR) |

| Mar 30 | Utah Warriors | 31–64 | Toronto Arrows | Zions Bank Stadium |
| 19:00 MDT | Try: Jackson Kaka 19' c Penalty try 23'; Fetuʻu Vainikolo 27' m Tonata Lauti 57' c Nolan Tuamoheloa 66' m Con: Tim O'Malley (2/3) 20', 58'; Josh Reeves (0/1) | ARN Report | Try: Rob Brouwer 5' c Mike Sheppard 9' c Dan Moor 15' m Kolby Francis 38' c Lucas Rumball 45' c Marcello Wainwright 49' c Avery Oitomen 53' c Gastón Mieres 59' c Kainoa Lloyd 78' c Con: Sam Malcolm (8/9) 6', 10', 39', 46', 51', 54', 60', 79'; Pen: Sam Malcolm (1/1) 77'; Cards: Andrew Ferguson (yellow card) 23' to 33' | Attendance: 2,245; Referee: Derek Summers (USAR) |

| Mar 31 | Seattle Seawolves | 22–28 | San Diego Legion | Starfire Sports |
| 17:00 PDT | Try: Stephan Coetzee (2) 30' m, 56' m Jérémy Lenaerts 64' m Mathew Turner 70' c Con: Brock Staller (0/3); Ben Cima (1/1) 71'; Cards: Cam Polson (yellow card) 44' to 54' | ARN Report | Try: Dean Muir 6' c Louis Stanfill 19' c Jasa Veremalua 67' m Con: Joe Pietersen (2/2) 7', 20'; Dylan Audsley (0/1); Pen: Joe Pietersen (3/3) 26', 40', 45'; Dylan Audsley (0/2); Drop: Joe Pietersen (0/1); Cards: Jasa Veremalua (yellow card) 35' to 45'; Keni Nasoqeqe (red card) 39'; Jordan Manihera (yellow card) 49' to 59' | Attendance: 3,723; Referee: Elgan Williams (WRU) |

Bye/s: Houston Sabercats

==== Week 11 ====
| Apr 5 | Utah Warriors | 36–48 | Seattle Seawolves | Zions Bank Stadium |
| 19:00 MDT | Try: Franco van den Berg 17' c Fetuʻu Vainikolo 27' c Nolan Tuamoheloa 34' m Tim O'Malley 43' c Jared Whippy 72' c Con: Tim O'Malley (4/5) 18', 28', 44', 73'; Pen: Tim O'Malley (1/1) 6' | ARN Report | Try: Brock Staller 9' c Brad Tucker (2) 31' c, 46' c Sequoyah Burke-Combs 50' c Stephan Coetzee 57' m Riekert Hattingh 66' c Mathew Turner 76' m Con: Brock Staller (5/7) 10', 32', 47', 51', 67'; Pen: Brock Staller (1/1) 2' | Attendance: 2,431; Referee: Luke Rogan (USAR) |

| Apr 6 | Glendale Raptors | 52–44 | Houston SaberCats | Infinity Park |
| 18:00 MDT | Try: John Ryberg (3) 35' c, 39' c, 75' c Peter Dahl 41' c Robbie Petzer 44' c Malon Al-Jiboori 66' c Harley Davidson 79' c Con: Will Magie (5/5) 36', 40', 42', 45', 67'; Robbie Petzer (2/2) 76', 80'; Pen: Will Magie (1/1) 61'; Cards: Kelepi Fifita (yellow card) 27' to 37' | ARN Report | Try: Penalty try (2) 6', 13'; Malacchi Esdale 29' c Kelly Kolberg 32' m Deion Mikesell 54' m Sam Windsor 69' c Con: Sam Windsor (2/4) 30', 70'; Pen: Sam Windsor (2/2) 23', 28'; Cards: Diego Magno (yellow card) 39' to 49' | Attendance: 1,500; Referee: Elgan Williams (WRU) |

| Apr 7 | Toronto Arrows | 31–35 | NOLA Gold | Alumni Field |
| 14:00 EDT | Try: Dan Moor 1’ c Gastón Mieres (2) 25’ m, 39’ c Andrew Ferguson 45’ c Morgan Mitchell 53’ m Con: Sam Malcolm (3/5) 2’, 40’, 46’ Cards: Avery Oitomen (yellow card) 7' to 17' | ARN Report | Try: Penalty try 7’ JP Eloff 11’ c Tristan Blewett 13’ c Eric Howard 31’ c Ignacio Dotti 79’ c Con: JP Eloff (4/4) 12’, 14’, 32’, 80’ Cards: Kyle Baillie (yellow card) 34' to 44' | Attendance: 3,081; Referee: Scott Green (USAR) |

| Apr 7 | San Diego Legion | 45–15 | Austin Elite | Torero Stadium |
| 19:30 PDT | Try: Save Totovosau 7’ m Ryan Matyas 15’ c Mike Te'o 21’ m Nate Augspurger 33’ c JP du Plessis 44’ c Psalm Wooching 49’ c Nick Boyer 78’ c Con: Joe Pietersen (4/6) 16’, 34’, 45’, 50’ Dylan Audsley (1/1) 79’ | ARN Report | Try: LaRome White 28’ c Maikeli Mudu 72’ m Con: Andres Vilaseca (1/2) 29’ Pen: Andres Vilaseca (1/1) 3’ | Attendance: 2,299; Referee: Paul-Henri Courbier (USAR) |

Bye/s: RUNY

==== Week 12 ====
| Apr 13 | NOLA Gold | 28–19 | Utah Warriors | Gold Stadium |
| 14:00 CDT | Try: Tristan Blewett 3' c Cam Dolan 23' c JP Eloff 53' c Taylor Howden 70' c Con: JP Eloff (4/4) 4', 24', 54', 71'; Cards: Hubert Buydens (yellow card) 37' to 47' | ARN Report | Try: Johnny Ika 39' m Josh Whippy 50' c Lance Williams 64' c Con: Tim O'Malley (2/3) 51', 65' | Attendance: 1,603; Referee: Paul-Henri Courbier (USAR) |

| Apr 13 | Houston SaberCats | 10–52 | Seattle Seawolves | Aveva Stadium |
| 19:00 CDT | Try: Sam Windsor 16' m Thretton Palamo 69' m Con: Sam Windsor (0/2) | ARN Report | Try: Kellen Gordon 3' m Nakai Penny 36' m Brock Staller 55' c Stephan Coetzee 60' m Brad Tucker 62' c Roland Suniula 75' c Mathew Turner 78' c Con: Brock Staller (4/7) 56', 63', 76', 79'; Pen: Brock Staller (3/3) 12', 48', 53'; Cards: Daniel Trierweiler (yellow card) 68' to 78' | Attendance: 1,712; Referee: Derek Summers (USAR) |

| Apr 14 | RUNY | 19–29 | San Diego Legion | MCU Park |
| 13:00 EDT | Try: Alex MacDonald 4' c James Denise 6' m Mike Petri 39' c Con: Chris Mattina (2/3) 5', 40' | ARN Report | Try: Save Totovosau 8' m Paddy Ryan 34' c Penalty try 53'; Conor Kearns 58' m Joe Pietersen 77' m Con: Joe Pietersen (1/4) 35' | Attendance: 945; Referee: Elgan Williams (WRU) |

| May 9 (Rescheduled from April 14 postponement) | Toronto Arrows | 24–13 | Austin Elite | Alumni Field |
| 19:00 EDT | Try: Andrew Ferguson 25' c Leandro Leivas 32' c Rob Brouwer 49' m Kainoa Lloyd 63' m Con: Andrew Ferguson (2/4) 26', 33' | ARN Report | Try: Simon Bienvenu 78' c Con: Zinzan Elan-Puttick (1/1) 78'; Pen: Andrés Vilaseca (2/3) 4', 22'; Cards: Juan Echeverría (yellow card) 60' to 70' | Attendance: 812; Referee: Moe Chaudhry (RC) |

Bye/s: Glendale Raptors

==== Week 13 ====
| Apr 20 | San Diego Legion | 46–15 | Glendale Raptors | Torero Stadium |
| 14:00 PDT | Try: Jasa Veremalua 23'; Mike Te'o (2) 26', 69'; Nick Boyer 32'; Pat Blair 57'; Psalm Wooching 61'; Con: Joe Pieterson (5/5) 24', 27', 33', 58', 62'; Pen: Joe Pieterson (2/2) 5', 15' | ARN Report | Try: Marco Fepulea'i 40'; John Ryberg 75'; Con: Will Magie (1/2) 40'; Pen: Will Magie (1/1) 10' | Referee: Scott Green (USAR) |

| Apr 20 | RUNY | 24–22 | Utah Warriors | MCU Park |
| 19:30 EDT | Try: Connor Wallace-Sims (2) 26', 46; Dylan Fawsitt 35'; Anthony Parry 60'; Con: Chris Mattina (2/4) 36', 61' | ARN Report | Try: Gannon Moore 29'; Don Pati 39'; Johnny Ika 41'; Con: Tim O'Malley (2/3) 30', 42'; Pen: Tim O'Malley (1/2) 51'; Cards: Lance Williams (yellow card) 68' to 78' | Attendance: 1,052; Referee: Luke Rogan (USAR) |

| Apr 21 | Toronto Arrows | 35–21 | Houston SaberCats | Alumni Field |
| 14:00 EDT | Try: Kolby Francis 4'; Theo Sauder 19'; Andrew Quattrin 30'; Mike Sheppard 52'; Kainoa Lloyd 68'; Con: Sam Malcolm (3/3) 5', 20', 31'; Giuseppe du Toit (2/2) 53', 69' | ARN Report | Try: Zach Pangelinan 35'; Pat O'Toole 40'; Penalty try 44'; Con: Sam Windsor (2/2) 36', 40' | Attendance: 1,575; Referee: Derek Summers (USAR) |

| Apr 21 | Seattle Seawolves | 25–24 | NOLA Gold | Starfire Sports |
| 19:00 PDT | Try: Riekert Hattingh 47'; Con: Brock Staller (1/1) 48'; Pen: Brock Staller (6/6) 20', 28', 34', 40', 62', 77' | ARN Report | Try: Eric Howard 24'; Con Foley 50'; Tristan Blewett 55'; Kevin Sullivan 78'; Con: JP Eloff (2/4) 25', 79' | Attendance: 3,750; Referee: Sam Grove-White (SRU) |

Bye/s: Austin Elite

==== Week 14 ====
| Apr 26 | Glendale Raptors | 20–16 | RUNY | Infinity Park |
| 19:30 MDT | Try: Joe Ryberg 38'; Chad London 79'; Con: Dylan Taikato-Simpson (1/1) 39'; Will Magie (1/1) 80'; Pen: Dylan Taikato-Simpson (2/2) 4', 15'; Cards: Connor Cook (yellow card) 56' to 66' | ARN Report | Try: John Quill 57'; Con: Cathal Marsh (1/1) 58'; Pen: Connor Wallace-Sims (2/2) 22', 35'; Harry Bennett (1/1) 75' | Referee: Sam Grove-White (SRU) |

| Apr 27 | Utah Warriors | 35–19 | Austin Elite | Zions Bank Stadium |
| 18:00 MDT | Try: Fetuʻu Vainikolo (2) 3' c, 77' c James Semple 26' c Awara Elkington 41' c Les Soloai 66' c Con: Tim O'Malley (5/5) 4', 27', 42', 67', 78' | ARN Report | Try: Juan Echeverría 18' c Andrés Vilaseca 21' m Rikus Zwart 80' c Con: Andrés Vilaseca (1/2) 19'; Juan Pablo Aguirre (1/1) 80' | Attendance: 3,104; Referee: Derek Summers (USAR) |

| Apr 28 | Toronto Arrows | 29–7 | Seattle Seawolves | Alumni Field |
| 13:00 EDT | Try: Mike Sheppard 34'; Leandro Leivas 45'; Dan Moor 70'; Paul Ciulini 74'; Con: Sam Malcolm (3/4) 46', 71', 75'; Pen: Sam Malcolm (1/1) 25'; Cards: Leandro Leivas (yellow card) 29' to 39' | ARN Report | Try: Shalom Suniula 62'; Con: Brock Staller (1/1) 63' | Attendance: 2,187; Referee: Scott Green (USAR) |

| Apr 28 | Houston SaberCats | 19–40 | San Diego Legion | Dyer Stadium |
| 18:00 CDT | Try: Deion Mikesell 20'; Thretton Palamo 61'; Charlie Connolly 71'; Con: Sam Windsor (2/3) 21', 62; Pen: Sam Windsor (0/1); Cards: Mateo Sanguinetti (yellow card) 50' to 60' | ARN Report | Try: Mike Te'o 6'; Joe Pietersen 24'; Nate Augspurger 37; Nick Boyer 40'; Nick Lupian 52'; Keni Nasoqeqe 56'; Con: Joe Pietersen (4/4) 7', 25', 38', 40'; Dylan Audsley (1/1) 53'; Tai Enosa (0/1); Pen: Nick Boyer (0/1) | Attendance: 1,000; Referee: Luke Rogan (USAR) |

Bye/s: NOLA Gold

==== Week 15 ====
| May 4 | NOLA Gold | 26–14 | Austin Elite | Gold Stadium |
| 15:30 CDT | Try: Eric Howard 1'; Ignacio Dotti 29'; Penalty try 43'; Billy Stewart 45'; Con: JP Eloff (2/3) 2', 46'; Cards: Con Foley (yellow card) 70' to 80' | ARN Report | Try: Dom Bailey 38'; Soheyl Jaoudat 60'; Con: Andrés Vilaseca (2/2) 39', 61'; Cards: Mason Pedersen (yellow card) 43' to 53' | Attendance: 1,169; Referee: Paul-Henri Courbier (USAR) |

| May 4 | Glendale Raptors | 64–22 | Utah Warriors | Infinity Park |
| 19:00 MDT | Try: John Ryberg 18'; Robbie Petzer (3 tries) 23', 25', 71'; Chad London (2 tries) 35', 60'; Shaun Davies 41'; Dylan Taikato-Simpson 56'; Mika Kruse 77'; Con: Robbie Petzer (8/9) 19', 24', 26', 36', 42', 57', 61', 72'; Pen: Robbie Petzer (1/1) 16'; Cards: Murphy Taramai (yellow card) 10' to 20' | ARN Report | Try: Josh Anderson 11'; Gannon Moore 52'; Matt Jensen 74'; Con: Tim O'Malley (2/2) 12', 53'; Pen: Tim O'Malley (1/1) 9'; Cards: Fetuʻu Vainikolo (yellow card) 17' to 27' | Referee: Scott Green (USAR) |

| May 5 | Toronto Arrows | 23–19 | San Diego Legion | Lamport Stadium |
| 14:00 EDT | Try: Leandro Leivas 67'; Steven Ng 78'; Con: Sam Malcolm (2/2) 68', 79'; Pen: Sam Malcolm (3/3) 23', 26', 43' | ARN Report | Try: JP du Plessis 18'; Mike Te'o 39'; Joe Pietersen 71'; Con: Joe Pieterson (2/3) 40', 72'; Pen: Joe Pieterson (0/1); Cards: JP du Plessis (yellow card) 24' to 34'; Nate Augspurger (yellow card) 65' to 75'; Dino Waldren (yellow card) 77' to 87' | Attendance: 2,800; Referee: Luke Rogan (USAR) |

| May 5 | RUNY | 21–0 | Houston SaberCats | MCU Park |
| 17:00 EDT | Try: Dylan Fawsitt (2 tries) 14', 70'; Paddy Ryan 18'; Con: Harry Bennett (3/3) 15', 18', 71' | ARN Report | Cards: Pat O'Toole (yellow card) 13' to 23'; Alejandro Nieto (yellow card) 16' to 26'; Josua Vici (yellow card) 77' to 87' | Attendance: 1,223; Referee: Sam Grove-White (SRU) |

Bye/s: Seattle Seawolves

==== Week 16 ====
| May 11 | NOLA Gold | 19–26 | San Diego Legion | Gold Stadium |
| 14:00 CDT | Try: Cam Dolan 17' m Tristan Blewett (2) 35' c, 54' c Con: JP Eloff (0/1); Scott Gale (2/2) 36', 55' | ARN Report | Try: Save Totovosau 7' m Nick Boyer 27' c JP du Plessis 42' c Tai Enosa 70' c Con: Joe Pietersen (2/3) 28', 43'; Will Holder (1/1) 71' | Attendance: 1,497; Referee: Elgan Williams (WRU) |

| May 11 | RUNY | 31–38 | Seattle Seawolves | MCU Park |
| 16:30 EDT | Try: Paddy Ryan 27' c Will Leonard 47' c Connor Wallace-Sims 51' c Dylan Fawsitt (2) 72' m, 75' m Con: Cathal Marsh (3/5) 28', 48', 52' | ARN Report | Try: Mathew Turner (2) 12' c, 17'c Riekert Hattingh 16' c Juan-Philip Smith 40' c Phil Mack 65' c Con: Brock Staller (5/5) 13', 17', 18', 40', 66'; Pen: Brock Staller (1/1) 39' | Attendance: 1,945; Referee: Scott Green (USAR) |

| May 12 | Toronto Arrows | 28–21 | Utah Warriors | Lamport Stadium |
| 14:00 EDT | Try: Morgan Mitchell 21' c Johnny Sheridan 38' c Penalty try 56'; Spencer Jones 76' c Con: Sam Malcolm (3/3) 22', 39', 77' | ARN Report | Try: Arthur Bergo 2' c Jeremy Misailegalu 29' m Con: Tim O'Malley (1/2) 3'; Pen: Tim O'Malley (3/3) 33', 44', 68' | Attendance: 1,224; Referee: Anthony Woodthorpe (RFU) |

| May 29 (Rescheduled from May 11 postponement) | Houston SaberCats | 32–17 | Glendale Raptors | Aveva Stadium |
| 19:30 CDT | Try: Jamie Dever 15' c Josua Vici 22' c Sam Windsor (2) 36' c, 65' m Con: Sam Windsor (3/4) 16', 23', 37'; Pen: Sam Windsor (2/3) 3', 46'; Cards: Victor Comptat (yellow card) 20' to 30' | ARN Report | Try: Harley Davidson (2) 11' m, 63' c Dylan Takaito-Simpson 56' m Con: Robbie Petzer (0/1); Will Magie (1/2) 64' | Attendance: 1,811; Referee: Derek Summers (USAR) |

Bye/s: Austin Elite

==== Week 17 ====
| May 18 | NOLA Gold | 20–27 | Houston SaberCats | Gold Stadium |
| 16:00 CDT | Try: Eric Howard 24' c Tristan Blewett 34' c Con: JP Eloff (2/2) 25', 35'; Pen: JP Eloff (2/2) 6', 79'; Cards: Cam Dolan (yellow card) 68' to 78' | ARN Report | Try: Sam Windsor 18' c Santiago Arata 39' c Alejandro Nieto 62' c Con: Sam Windsor (3/3) 19', 49', 63'; Pen: Sam Windsor (2/3) 3', 52' | Attendance: 1,505; Referee: Anthony Woodthorpe (RFU) |

| May 18 | Glendale Raptors | 36–53 | Seattle Seawolves | Infinity Park |
| 16:00 MDT | Try: John Ryberg 2' c Brendan Daly 30' c Luke White 36' c Dylan Taikato-Simpson 46' c Kody O'Neil 72' m Con: Robbie Petzer (4/4) 3', 31', 37', 47'; Will Magie (0/1); Pen: Robbie Petzer (1/1) 23' | ARN Report | Try: Stephan Coetzee (2) 10' m, 42' c Brock Staller 13' m George Barton 17' c Mathew Turner (2) 27' c, 66' m JP Smith (2) 48' c, 62' c Con: Brock Staller (5/8) 18', 28', 43', 49', 63; Pen: Brock Staller (1/1) 40'; Cards: Shalom Suniula (yellow card) 79' to 89' | Attendance: 4,000; Referee: Elgan Williams (WRU) |

| May 18 | Utah Warriors | 21–31 | San Diego Legion | Zions Bank Stadium |
| 19:00 MDT | Try: Jeremy Leber 23' c Johnny Ika 58' c John Cullen 77' c Con: Tim O'Malley (3/3) 24', 59, 78'; Cards: James Semple (yellow card) 38' to 48' | ARN Report | Try: Jordan Manihera 9' c Save Totovosau (2) 26' m, 39' m Nate Augspurger 74' c Mike Te'o 79' c Con: Tai Enosa (1/3) 10'; Will Holder (2/2) 75', 80'; Cards: Pat Blair (yellow card) 47' to 57' | Referee: Scott Green (USAR) |

| May 19 | RUNY | 27–7 | Austin Elite | MCU Park |
| 13:00 EDT | Try: Luke Hume 12' m Mike St. Claire 16' m Dylan Fawsitt 46' m Connor Wallace-Sims 66' m Mike Petri 80' c Con: Harry Bennett (0/4); Connor Wallace-Sims (1/1) 80'; Pen: Connor Wallace-Sims (0/1) | ARN Report | Try: Andrew Suniula 74' c Con: Zinzan Elan-Puttick (1/1) 75' | Attendance: 1,631; Referee: Luke Rogan (USAR) |

Bye/s: Toronto Arrows

==== Week 18 ====
| May 25 | Houston SaberCats | 36–15 | Austin Elite | Aveva Stadium |
| 17:00 CDT | Try: Jamason Fa’anana-Schultz (2) 13' c, 31' c Thretton Palamo (2) 16' m, 79' c Cecil Garber 34' m Malacchi Esdale 56' m Con: Sam Windsor (2/5) 14', 32'; Osea Kolinisau (1/1) 80'; Cards: Pat O'Toole (yellow card) 28' to 38' | ARN Report | Try: LaRome White 47' m Andrés Vilaseca 75'; Con: Andrés Vilaseca (0/1); Pen: Andrés Vilaseca (1/2) 20' | Attendance: 1,859; Referee: Luke Rogan (USAR) |

| May 26 | RUNY | 24–22 | NOLA Gold | MCU Park |
| 13:00 EDT | Try: Penalty try 18'; Matt Hughston 28' c Dylan Fawsitt 36' c Con: Cathal Marsh (2/2) 29', 37'; Pen: Cathal Marsh (1/1) 63' | ARN Report | Try: Cam Dolan 6' c Tim Maupin 22' c Nick Feakes 55' m Con: JP Eloff (2/3) 7', 23'; Pen: JP Eloff (1/1) 13'; Cards: Tristan Blewett (yellow card) 35' to 45' | Attendance: 1,685; Referee: Elgan Williams (WRU) |

| May 26 | Toronto Arrows | 40–12 | Glendale Raptors | Lamport Stadium |
| 14:00 EDT | Try: Morgan Mitchell 5' m Gastón Mieres (2) 16' c, 34' c Luke Campbell 27' c Andrew Ferguson 54' c Tom van Horn 66' c Con: Sam Malcolm (5/6) 17', 27', 35', 55', 67' | ARN Report | Try: Carlo de Nysschen 12' c Mika Kruse 46' m Con: Will Magie (1/2) 13' | Attendance: 2,749; Referee: Anthony Woodthorpe (RFU) |

| May 26 | Seattle Seawolves | 27–27 | Utah Warriors | Starfire Sports |
| 17:00 PDT | Try: JP Smith 3' c Penalty try 22'; Shalom Suniula 67' c Con: Brock Staller (2/2) 4', 67'; Pen: Brock Staller (2/2) 33', 76' | ARN Report | Try: Fetuʻu Vainikolo (2) 8' m, 37' m Tim O'Malley 13' c Josh Whippy 18' c Con: Tim O'Malley (2/4) 14', 19'; Pen: Tim O'Malley (1/1) 29' | Attendance: 3,800; Referee: Derek Summers (USAR) |

Bye/s: San Diego Legion

==== Week 19 ====
| Jun 1 | Utah Warriors | 27–31 | Houston SaberCats | Zions Bank Stadium |
| 18:00 MDT | Try: Jeremy Leber 27' c Johnny Ika 43' c Josh Reeves 47' c Con: Tim O'Malley (3/3) 28', 44', 48'; Pen: Tim O'Malley (2/2) 13', 61'; Cards: Awara Elkington (yellow card) 64' to 74' | ARN Report | Try: Jamason Fa’anana-Schultz 4' c Malacchi Esdale 19' c Deion Mikesell 21' c Osea Kolinisau 65' c Con: Sam Windsor (4/4) 5', 20', 22' 66'; Pen: Sam Windsor (1/1) 35'; Matt Trouville (0/1) | Attendance: 3,380; Referee: Lex Weiner (USAR) |

| Jun 2 | Toronto Arrows | 22–20 | RUNY | Lamport Stadium |
| 13:00 EDT | Try: Dan Moor 15'; Spencer Jones 20'; Andrew Ferguson 65'; Con: Sam Malcolm (2/3) 21', 66'; Drop: Sam Malcolm (1/1) 77' | ARN Report | Try: Mike St. Claire 6'; John Quill 43'; Con: Cathal Marsh (2/2) 7', 44'; Pen: Cathal Marsh (2/2) 49, 58' | Attendance: 3,180; Referee: Elgan Williams (WRU) |

| Jun 2 | San Diego Legion | 22–10 | NOLA Gold | Torero Stadium |
| 16:30 PDT | Try: Paddy Ryan 33'; Jasa Veremalua 38'; Mike Te'o 45'; Con: Joe Pietersen (2/3) 34', 39'; Pen: Joe Pietersen (1/1) 62' | ARN Report | Try: Nikola Bursic 51'; Con: JP Eloff (1/1) 52'; Pen: JP Eloff (1/1) 5' | Attendance: 4,175; Referee: Scott Green (USAR) |

| Jun 2 | Seattle Seawolves | 38–26 | Austin Elite | Starfire Sports |
| 17:00 PDT | Try: Djustice Sears-Duru 8'; Brad Tucker (2 tries) 32', 40'; Riekert Hattingh 51'; Jeff Hassler 64'; Con: Brock Staller (5/5) 9', 33', 40', 52', 65'; Pen: Brock Staller (1/1) 21' | ARN Report | Try: Travis Larsen 12'; Sione Fangaiuiha 67'; Moe Abdelmonem 71'; Mason Pedersen 77'; Con: Zinan Elan-Puttick (1/2) 13'; Andrew Suniula (2/2) 72', 77' | Attendance: 3,800; Referee: Anthony Woodthorpe (RFU) |

Bye/s: Glendale Raptors

== Playoffs ==
=== Bracket ===
Semi-Finals
1 | San Diego Legion | 24
4 | Rugby United New York | 22
2 | Seattle Seawolves | 30
3 | Toronto Arrows | 17

Finals
1 | San Diego Legion | 23
2 | Seattle Seawolves | 26

=== Semifinals ===
| Jun 9 | San Diego Legion #1 | 24–22 | RUNY #4 | Torero Stadium |
| 14:00 PDT | Try: Oti Pifeleti 29' c Joshua Furno 41' c JP du Plessis 78' c Con: Joe Pietersen (3/3) 30', 42', 79'; Pen: Joe Pietersen (1/1) 37' | ARN Report | Try: Paddy Ryan 15' c Dylan Fawsitt 40' m James Denise 59' c Con: Cathal Marsh (2/3) 16', 60'; Pen: Cathal Marsh (1/2) 45' | Attendance: 4,500; Referee: Anthony Woodthorpe (RFU) |

| Jun 9 | Seattle Seawolves #2 | 30–17 | Toronto Arrows #3 | Starfire Sports |
| 18:00 PDT | Try: Juan-Philip Smith 6' c Jeff Hassler 26' c Penalty try 68'; Con: Brock Staller (2/2) 7', 27'; Pen: Brock Staller (3/5) 5', 16', 34' | ARN Report | Try: Gastón Mieres 39' c Mike Sheppard 49' c Con: Sam Malcolm (2/2) 40', 50'; Pen: Sam Malcolm (1/1) 62'; Cards: Peter Milazzo (yellow card) 68' to 78' | Attendance: 3,270; Referee: Scott Green (USAR) |

=== Final ===
| Jun 16 | San Diego Legion #1 | 23–26 | Seattle Seawolves #2 | Torero Stadium |
| 1:00 PDT | Try: Boyer 52’ c Manihera 65’ c Con: Pietersen 2/2 (53’, 66’); Pen: Pietersen 2/2 (6’, 21’); Drop: Pietersen 1/2 (78’) | ARN Report | Try: Coetzee 22’ c Smith 32’ c Hattingh 71’ m Tucker 80’ c Con: Staller 3/4 (23’, 33’, 82’) | Attendance: 6,000; Referee: Scott Green (USAR) |

== Players statistics ==
=== Top scorers ===
The top ten try and point scorers during the 2019 Major League Rugby season are:

Last updated June 5, 2019

Most tries
| No | Player | Team | Tries |
|---|---|---|---|
| 1 | (United States) John Ryberg | Glendale Raptors | 13 |
| 1 | (United States) Dylan Fawsitt | Rugby United New York | 13 |
| 3 | (South Africa) Tristan Blewett | NOLA Gold | 12 |
| 4 | (Canada) Eric Howard | NOLA Gold | 9 |
| 4 | (United States) Mike Te'o | San Diego Legion | 9 |
| 6 | (England) Mathew Turner | Seattle Seawolves | 8 |
| 6 | (South Africa) Stephan Coetzee | Seattle Seawolves | 8 |
| 6 | (United States) Riekert Hattingh | Seattle Seawolves | 8 |
| 9 | (United States) Connor Wallace-Sims | RUNY | 7 |
| 9 | (New Zealand) Brad Tucker | Seattle Seawolves | 7 |
| 9 | (Canada) Dan Moor | Toronto Arrows | 7 |

Most points
| No | Player | Team | Pts |
|---|---|---|---|
| 1 | (Canada) Brock Staller | Seattle Seawolves | 223 |
| 2 | (South Africa) Joe Pietersen | San Diego Legion | 163 |
| 3 | (Australia) Sam Windsor | Houston SaberCats | 160 |
| 4 | (New Zealand) Sam Malcolm | Toronto Arrows | 152 |
| 5 | (United States) JP Eloff | NOLA Gold | 141 |
| 6 | (New Zealand) Tim O'Malley | Utah Warriors | 134 |
| 7 | (South Africa) Robbie Petzer | Glendale Raptors | 85 |
| 8 | (Ireland) Cathal Marsh | RUNY | 69 |
| 9 | (United States) John Ryberg | Glendale Raptors | 65 |
| 9 | (United States) Dylan Fawsitt | RUNY | 65 |

=== Sanctions ===
| Player | Team | Red | Yellow |
|---|---|---|---|
| (Fiji) Josua Vici | Houston SaberCats | 1 | 2 |
| (Fiji) Keni Nasoqeqe | San Diego Legion | 1 | 1 |
| (Fiji) Osea Kolinisau | Houston SaberCats | 1 | 0 |
| (United States) Lance Williams | Utah Warriors | 0 | 3 |
| (United States) Connor Cook | Glendale Raptors | 0 | 2 |
| (Australia) Con Foley | NOLA Gold | 0 | 2 |
| (Ireland) Pat O'Toole | Houston SaberCats | 0 | 2 |
| (Ireland) Jamie Dever | Houston SaberCats | 0 | 1 |
| (Canada) Jack Evans | Toronto Arrows | 0 | 1 |
| (United States) Matt Hughston | Rugby United NY | 0 | 1 |
| (United States) Tim Maupin | NOLA Gold | 0 | 1 |
| (Australia) Peni Tagive | Austin Elite | 0 | 1 |
| (United States) Sione Tuihalamaka | San Diego Legion | 0 | 1 |
| (United States) Chris Turori | San Diego Legion | 0 | 1 |
| (Canada) Rob Brouwer | Toronto Arrows | 0 | 1 |
| (Canada) Phil Mack | Seattle Seawolves | 0 | 1 |
| (New Zealand) Sam Malcolm | Toronto Arrows | 0 | 1 |
| (United States) Dylan Fawsitt | Rugby United NY | 0 | 1 |
| (Morocco) Soheyl Jaoudat | Austin Elite | 0 | 1 |
| (Fiji) Maikeli Naromaitoga | Utah Warriors | 0 | 1 |
| (United States) Josh Whippy | Utah Warriors | 0 | 1 |
| (Australia) Luke Beauchamp | Houston Sabercats | 0 | 1 |
| (United States) Jeremy Misailegalu | Utah Warriors | 0 | 1 |
| (Samoa) Kane Thompson | NOLA Gold | 0 | 1 |
| (South Africa) Franco van den Berg | Utah Warriors | 0 | 1 |
| (South Africa) Tiaan Erasmus | Austin Elite | 0 | 1 |
| (Canada) Moe Abdelmonem | Austin Elite | 0 | 1 |
| (United States) Kevin Sullivan | NOLA Gold | 0 | 1 |
| (United States) James Denise | Rugby United NY | 0 | 1 |
| (United States) Zach Fenoglio | Glendale Raptors | 0 | 1 |
| (Uruguay) Ignacio Dotti | NOLA Gold | 0 | 1 |
| (Canada) Andrew Ferguson | Toronto Arrows | 0 | 1 |
| (Canada) Cam Polson | Seattle Seawolves | 0 | 1 |
| (Fiji) Jasa Veremalua | San Diego Legion | 0 | 1 |
| (New Zealand) Jordan Manihera | San Diego Legion | 0 | 1 |
| (United States) Will Magie | Glendale Raptors | 0 | 1 |
| (Uruguay) Diego Magno | Houston SaberCats | 0 | 1 |
| (Canada) Avery Oitomen | Toronto Arrows | 0 | 1 |
| (Canada) Kyle Baillie | NOLA Gold | 0 | 1 |
| (Canada) Hubert Buydens | NOLA Gold | 0 | 1 |
| (United States) Daniel Trierweiler | Seattle Seawolves | 0 | 1 |
| (Uruguay) Leandro Leivas | Toronto Arrows | 0 | 1 |
| (Uruguay) Mateo Sanguinetti | Houston SaberCats | 0 | 1 |
| (United States) Mason Pedersen | Austin Elite | 0 | 1 |
| (New Zealand) Murphy Taramai | Glendale Raptors | 0 | 1 |
| (Tonga) Fetuʻu Vainikolo | Utah Warriors | 0 | 1 |
| (South Africa) JP du Plessis | San Diego Legion | 0 | 1 |
| (United States) Nate Augspurger | San Diego Legion | 0 | 1 |
| (United States) Dino Waldren | San Diego Legion | 0 | 1 |
| (Uruguay) Alejandro Nieto | Houston SaberCats | 0 | 1 |
| (Uruguay) Juan Echeverría | Austin Elite | 0 | 1 |
| (United States) Cam Dolan | NOLA Gold | 0 | 1 |
| (United States) Shalom Suniula | Seattle Seawolves | 0 | 1 |
| (New Zealand) James Semple | Utah Warriors | 0 | 1 |
| (United States) Pat Blair | San Diego Legion | 0 | 1 |
| (South Africa) Tristan Blewett | NOLA Gold | 0 | 1 |
| (New Zealand) Awara Elkington | Utah Warriors | 0 | 1 |
| (Canada) Peter Milazzo | Toronto Arrows | 0 | 1 |

== Awards ==
MVP of the Championship Match

| Player | Team |
|---|---|
| (South Africa) JP Smith | Seattle Seawolves |

All-MLR Awards

| Player of the Year | Forward of the Year | Back of the Year | Coach of the Year |
|---|---|---|---|
| Brad Tucker; Seattle Seawolves | Paddy Ryan; San Diego Legion | JP Du Plessis; San Diego Legion | Rob Hoadley; Utah Warriors |

All-MLR First Team

| Player | Position | Team |
|---|---|---|
| (Canada) Rob Brouwer | Loosehead Prop | Toronto Arrows |
| (United States) Dylan Fawsitt | Hooker | Rugby United New York |
| (Australia) Paddy Ryan | Tighthead Prop | San Diego Legion |
| (Canada) Mike Sheppard | Left Lock | Toronto Arrows |
| (United States) Nate Brakeley | Right Lock | Rugby United New York |
| (New Zealand) Brad Tucker | Blindside Flanker | Seattle Seawolves |
| (Canada) Nakai Penny | Openside Flanker | Seattle Seawolves |
| (United States) Riekert Hattingh | No8 | Seattle Seawolves |
| (United States) Nate Augspurger | Scrum-half | San Diego Legion |
| (South Africa) Joe Pietersen | Fly-half | San Diego Legion |
| (United States) Connor Wallace-Sims | Blindside Wing | Rugby United New York |
| (South Africa) JP du Plessis | Inside Center | San Diego Legion |
| (South Africa) Tristan Blewett | Outside Center | New Orleans Gold |
| (United States) John Ryberg | Openside Wing | Glendale Raptors |
| (United States) JP Eloff | Fullback | New Orleans Gold |

All-MLR Second Team

| Player | Position | Team |
|---|---|---|
| (South Africa) Franco van den Berg | Loosehead Prop | Utah Warriors |
| (Canada) Eric Howard | Hooker | New Orleans Gold |
| (New Zealand) Morgan Mitchell | Tighthead Prop | Toronto Arrows |
| (Ireland) Ben Mitchell | Left Lock | Austin Elite |
| (United States) Louis Stanfill | Right Lock | San Diego Legion |
| (United States) Lance Williams | Blindside Flanker | Utah Warriors |
| (United States) Matt Hughston | Openside Flanker | Rugby United New York |
| (United States) Cam Dolan | No8 | New Orleans Gold |
| (United States) Mike Petri | Scrum-half | Rugby United New York |
| (New Zealand) Sam Malcolm | Fly-half | Toronto Arrows |
| (Canada) Dan Moor | Blindside Wing | Toronto Arrows |
| (United States) Shalom Suniula | Inside Center | Seattle Seawolves |
| (United States) Ryan Matyas | Outside Center | San Diego Legion |
| (Canada) Brock Staller | Openside Wing | Seattle Seawolves |
| (England) Mathew Turner | Fullback | Seattle Seawolves |

== Attendances ==
| Team | Stadium | Capacity | Total Attendance | Average Attendance | % Capacity |
|---|---|---|---|---|---|
| Austin Elite | Dell Diamond; Toyota Field | 11,500; 8,296 | 4,560; 1,000 | 894; 1,000 | 7% 12% |
| Glendale Raptors | Infinity Park | 5,000 | 19,704 | 2,463 | 49% |
| Houston SaberCats | Constellation Field; Dyer Stadium; Aveva Stadium | 7,500; 6,000; 4,000 | 3,900; 1,000; 5,382 | 975; 1,000; 1,794 | 13% 17% 45% |
| New Orleans Gold | Gold Stadium | 3,000 | 12,857 | 1,428 | 47% |
| Rugby United New York | MCU Park | 7,000 | 14,184 | 1,773 | 25% |
| San Diego Legion | Torero Stadium | 6,000 | 30,425 | 3,043 | 51% |
| Seattle Seawolves | Starfire Stadium | 3,800 | 29,873 | 3,734 | 98% |
| Toronto Arrows | York Lions Stadium; Lamport Stadium | 3,700; 9,600 | 7,655; 9,953 | 1,913; 2,488 | 51% 26% |
| Utah Warriors | Zions Bank Stadium | 5,000 | 19,448 | 2,431 | 49% |
