= List of 2018–19 Major League Rugby transfers =

This is a list of player transfers involving Major League Rugby teams that occurred from the end of the 2018 season and through the 2019 season. The league confirmed the additions of two teams for the 2019 season, Rugby United New York and the Toronto Arrows.

== Austin Elite ==
Players in

- (United States) Dominique Bailey from (United States) Chicago Lions
- (France) Simon Bienvenu from (France) Racing 92
- (France) Simon Courcoul from (France) Grasse
- (Uruguay) Juan Echeverría from (Uruguay) Old Christians
- (South Africa) Tiaan Erasmus from (South Africa) CUT Ixias
- (Canada) Doug Fraser from (Canada) Castaway Wanderers
- (Chile) Sebastián Kalm from (United States) New Orleans Gold
- (Morocco) Soheyl Jaoudat from (France) Clermont
- (Canada) Travis Larsen from (Canada) James Bay
- (Canada) Josh Larsen from (New Zealand) Otago
- (South Africa) Dylan Pieterse from (South Africa) Boland Cavaliers
- (South Africa) Brendan Rams from (United States) Austin Blacks
- (Uruguay) Rodrigo Silva from (Uruguay) Carrasco Polo
- (Australia) Peni Tagive from (United States) Old Blue
- Marcelo Torrealba from Chile 7s
- (Uruguay) Andrés Vilaseca from (Uruguay) Old Boys
- (United States) LaRome White from (United States) Seattle Seawolves
- (South Africa) Rikus Zwart from (South Africa) Griffons

Players out

- (United States) Mike Brown to (United States) Rugby United New York
- (United States) Victor Comptat to (United States) Houston Sabercats
- (United States) Ross Deacon to (United States) Rugby United New York
- (United States) Robert Drummond to (United States) Austin Huns
- (Australia) Tim Fitzgerald to (United States) Austin Huns
- (United States) Hanco Germishuys to (United States) Glendale Raptors
- (United States) David LeMasters to (United States) Austin Huns
- (Fiji) Pita Naruma to (United States) Austin Huns
- (United States) Paddy Ryan to (United States) Rugby United New York
- (United States) Louis Stanfill to (United States) San Diego Legion
- (United States) Roland Suniula to (United States) Seattle Seawolves
- (Ireland) Marcus Walsh to (United States) Rugby United New York
- (South Africa) Pedrie Wannenburg retired.

== Glendale Raptors ==
Players in

- (United States) Malon Al-Jiboori from (United States) San Diego Legion
- (New Zealand) Marco Fepulea'i from (New Zealand) Auckland
- (United States) Hanco Germishuys from (United States) Austin Elite
- (United States) Chad Gough from (United States) University of Utah
- (United States) Colin Gregory from (United States) Clemson University
- (United States) Campbell Johnstone from (United States) Mount St. Mary's University
- (United States) Max Lum from (United States) Wheeling Jesuit
- (South Africa) Dwayne Pienaar from (South Africa) Roodepoort Rugby Club
- (Canada) Noah Barker from (Canada) James Bay AA

Players out

- (United States) Bryce Campbell to (England) London Irish
- (United States) Jake Christmann to (United States) Utah Warriors
- (United States) Dylan Fawsitt to (United States) Rugby United New York
- (Australia) Sam Figg to (Australia) NSW Country Eagles
- (Georgia (country)) Grigor Kerdikoshvili to (Georgia (country)) Lelo Saracens
- (United States) Ben Landry to (England) Ealing Trailfinders
- (United States) John Quill to (United States) Rugby United New York

== Houston SaberCats ==
Players in

- (United States) Matt Almeida from (United States) South Valley Bucks
- (Uruguay) Santiago Arata from (Uruguay) Old Christians
- (Australia) Luke Beauchamp from (Australia) Queensland Country
- (United States) Victor Comptat from (United States) Austin Elite
- (Ireland) Charlie Connolly from (Wales) RGC 1404
- (United States) Amro Gouda from (United States) New Orleans Gold
- (Ireland) Jason Harris-Wright from (England) Bristol
- (Uruguay) Diego Magno from (Uruguay) MVCC
- (Uruguay) Alejandro Nieto from (Uruguay) Champagnat
- (Ireland) Pat O'Toole from (United States) San Diego Legion
- (Uruguay) Mateo Sanguinetti from (Uruguay) Los Cuervos
- (Germany) Ayron Schramm from (Germany) Heidelberger RK
- (United States) Max Tacket from (Canada) Burnaby Lake
- (United States) Paul Mullen from (England) Newcastle Falcons

Players out

- (United States) Justin Allen to (England) Rotherham Titans
- (Jamaica) Kenneth Hepburn retired.
- (United States) Adam Macklin retired.
- (United States) Diego Maquieira to (United States) New England Free Jacks
- (United States) Chris Slater to (United States) New England Free Jacks
- (Australia) Lindsey Stevens to (Australia) Eastern Suburbs RUFC
- (United States) Kyle Sumsion to (United States) Rugby United New York

== New Orleans Gold ==
Players in

- (Canada) Kyle Baillie from (England) London Scottish
- (South Africa) Tristan Blewett from (South Africa) Southern Kings
- (United States) Cam Dolan from (England) Nottingham
- (Uruguay) Ignacio Dotti from (Uruguay) Los Cuervos
- (Australia) Nick Feakes from (United States) Lindenwood University
- (Australia) Con Foley from (Australia) Brisbane City
- (Australia) Scott Gale from (Australia) University of Queensland
- (United States) Matt Harmon from (United States) Lindenwood University
- (United States) Malcolm May from (United States) Penn State University
- (United States) Kevin Sullivan from (United States) University of California
- (Samoa) Kane Thompson from (New Zealand) Taranaki

Players out

- (United States) Amro Gouda to (United States) Houston SaberCats
- (United States) Matt Hughston to (United States) New England Free Jacks
- (Chile) Sebastián Kalm to (United States) Austin Elite
- (United States) Myles McQuone to (United States) New England Free Jacks
- (United States) Matt Wirken to (United States) Rugby United New York

== Rugby United New York ==
Players in

- (United States) Ross Deacon from (United States) Austin Elite
- (United States) Dylan Fawsitt from (United States) Glendale Raptors
- (England) Ben Foden from (England) Northampton Saints
- (United States) Matt Hughston from (United States) New England Free Jacks
- (Ireland) Will Leonard from (Ireland) Shannon RFC
- (Scotland) Callum Mackintosh from (Scotland) Currie Chieftains
- (Ireland) Cathal Marsh from (Ireland) Leinster
- (United States) Chris Mattina from (United States) USA 7s
- (United States) Myles McQuone from (United States) New England Free Jacks
- (Ireland) Mark O'Keeffe from (Ireland) Lansdowne
- (Ireland) James Rochford from (Ireland) Munster
- (United States) Paddy Ryan (United States) Austin Elite
- (United States) Marcus Satavu from (United States) Brooklyn Kings RLFC
- (United States) Seimou Smith from (United States) New Haven Old Blacks
- (United States) Kyle Sumsion from (United States) Houston SaberCats
- (Ireland) Marcus Walsh from (United States) Austin Elite
- (United States) Matt Wirken from (United States) New Orleans Gold

Players out

- TBC

== San Diego Legion ==
Players in

- (United States) Tai Enosa from San Francisco Golden Gate RFC
- (New Zealand) Liam Hallam-Eames from (New Zealand) Manawatu Turbos
- (Ireland) Conor Kearns from (Ireland) Trinity College
- (South Africa) Dean Muir from (Japan) Kintetsu Liners
- (Fiji) Keni Nasoqeqe from (United States) Belmont Shore RFC
- (Tonga) Kapeli Pifeleti from (England) Saracens
- (Australia) Paddy Ryan from (Japan) Munakata Sanix Blues
- (Australia) Matt Sandell from (Australia) NSW Waratahs
- (United States) Louis Stanfill from (United States) Austin Elite
- (Fiji) Save Totovosau from (Australia) Easts Tigers
- Jasa Veremalua from Fiji 7s

Players out

- (United States) Malon Al-Jiboori to (United States) Glendale Raptors
- (United States) Ben Cima to (United States) New England Free Jacks
- (United States) Cam Dolan to (England) Nottingham
- (United States) Tony Lamborn to (New Zealand) Southland (Note: Based on the MLR and Mitre 10 Cup seasons, this move does not preclude Lamborn returning to the Legion in 2019.)
- (Ireland) Tadhg Leader to (United States) New England Free Jacks
- (United States) Chris Mattina to USA 7s
- (Ireland) Pat O'Toole to (United States) Houston SaberCats
- (United States) Anthony Purpura to (United States) New England Free Jacks
- (United States) Anthony Salaber retired.
- (United States) Takudzwa Ngwenya released
- (South Africa) Dolph Botha released
- (United States) Josh Zamudio released
- (United States) Tasi Toilolo released
- (New Zealand) Mungo Mason released
- (United States) Patrick Walls released
- (South Africa) Lance Lamprecht released
- (United States) Faitala Talapusi released
- (United States) Cody Melphy released
- (United States) Sione Lutoi released
- (United States) Garrett Brewer released
- (United States) Austin Switzer released
- (United States) Naima Fuala’au released

== Seattle Seawolves ==
Players in

- (United States) Ben Cima from (United States) New England Free Jacks.
- (South Africa) Stephan Coetzee from (South Africa) Southern Kings
- (United States) Roland Suniula from (United States) Austin Elite
- (Canada) Djustice Sears-Duru from (Canada) Toronto Arrows
- (South Africa) JP Smith from (South Africa) Eastern Province Elephants
- (Fiji) Apisai Naikatini from (France) Aubenas
- (New Zealand) Brad Tucker from (New Zealand) Manawatu

Players out

- (Australia) Peter Smith to (Canada) Toronto Arrows (as backs coach) retired.
- (Canada) Ray Barkwill retired.

== Toronto Arrows ==
Players in

- (Canada) Jack Evans from (Wales) Llandovery
- (Uruguay) Gastón Mieres from (Uruguay) Lobos Rugby Club
- (New Zealand) Morgan Mitchell from (New Zealand) Southland
- (New Zealand) Sam Malcolm from (New Zealand) Manawatu
- (Canada) Dan Moor from (England) Yorkshire Carnegie
- (Uruguay) Leandro Leivas from (Uruguay) Old Christians
- (England) Jack Nay from (England) Saracens RFC (loan)

Players out

- (Canada) Djustice Sears-Duru to (United States) Seattle Seawolves

== Utah Warriors ==
Players in

- (United States) Jake Christmann from (United States) Glendale Raptors
- (United States) Gannon Moore from (New Zealand) North Harbour
- (Brazil) Josh Reeves from (Brazil) Bandeirantes
- (Australia) Ian Luciano from (United States) Mystic River Rugby Club

Players out

- (United States) Paul Lasike to (England) Harlequins
- (Tonga) Kurt Morath to (England) Doncaster Knights
- (United States) David Tameilau to (Scotland) Glasgow Warriors

== See also ==
- List of 2019–20 Major League Rugby transfers
- List of 2018–19 Premiership Rugby transfers
- List of 2018–19 RFU Championship transfers
- List of 2018–19 Super Rugby transfers
- List of 2018–19 Pro14 transfers
- List of 2018–19 Top 14 transfers
