= 2019 Major League Rugby final =

Championship rugby match

- Event: 2019 Major League Rugby season
San Diego Legion	Seattle Seawolves
(California)	(Washington (state))
23	26
- Date: June 16, 2019
- Venue: Torero Stadium, San Diego, California
- Man of the Match: JP Smith
- Referee: Scott Green (United States)
- Attendance: 6,000

The 2019 Major League Rugby final was the championship match of the 2nd season of Major League Rugby (MLR), a rugby union club competition in the United States. It was played on June 16, 2019, at Torero Stadium in San Diego, California, between the San Diego Legion and the Seattle Seawolves.

San Diego and Seattle finished first and second in the regular season, respectively, and advanced to the final after defeating New York and Toronto in the semifinals. The Seattle team was the defending champion, having won the 2018 final. Seattle defeated San Diego 26–23 in the 2019 final to take their second championship title.

== Background ==
The 2019 Major League Rugby season began in January 2019 with nine teams all playing each other home and away. The Seattle Seawolves won the previous season's championship, defeating the Glendale Raptors at Torero Stadium in San Diego.

Seattle and San Diego played each other twice during the regular season, ending in 17–13 and 28–22 victories for the Legion.

== Venue ==
Torero Stadium, home field of Major League Rugby team San Diego Legion, was selected as the venue for the final after the team finished as the top seed in the regular season. The stadium with a seating capacity of 6,000 on the campus of the University of San Diego is also home to the various athletics teams of the university.

== Broadcasting ==
The match was broadcast nationally on CBS. It received a rating of 0.34 (510,000).

== Match ==
=== Details ===
June 16	San Diego Legion	23–26	Seattle Seawolves	Torero Stadium, San Diego, California
1:00 pm EDT (UTC−04)	Try: Boyer 52’ c Manihera 65’ c Con: Pietersen 2/2 (53’, 66’); Pen: Pietersen 2/2 (6’, 21’); Drop: Pietersen 1/2 (78’)	ARN Report	Try: Coetzee 22’ c Smith 32‘ c Hattingh 71’ m Tucker 80’ c Con: Staller 3/4 (23’, 33’, 82’)	Attendance: 6,000; Referee: Scott Green (United States) Man of the Match: JP Smith

San Diego Legion	Seattle Seawolves

Team details

LP	1	(United States) Fakaʻosi Pifeleti	(substituted off) 40'
HK	2	(United States) Kapeli Pifeleti	(substituted off) 57'
TP	3	(Australia) Paddy Ryan	(substituted off) 61'
LL	4	(United States) Louis Stanfill	(substituted off) 61'
RL	5	(Italy) Joshua Furno
BF	6	(Fiji) Jasa Veremalua	(substituted off) 61'
OF	7	(United States) Psalm Wooching
N8	8	(New Zealand) Jordan Manihera
SH	9	(United States) Nate Augspurger (c)
FH	10	(South Africa) Joe Pietersen
LW	11	(United States) Nick Boyer
IC	12	(South Africa) JP du Plessis
OC	13	(United States) Ryan Matyas
RW	14	(United States) Conor Kearns
FB	15	(United States) Tai Enosa	(substituted off) 42'
Replacements:
HK	16	(South Africa) Dean Muir	(substituted in) 57'
PR	17	(United States) Nathan Sylvia	(substituted in) 40'
PR	18	(United States) Dino Waldren	(substituted in) 61'
LK	19	(United States) Siaosi Mahoni	(substituted in) 61'
FL	20	(United States) Pat Blair	(substituted in) 61'
FB	21	(United States) Kyle Rogers
WG	22	(Fiji) Save Totovosau
OB	23	(United States) Will Holder	(substituted in) 42'
Coach:
(England) Rob Hoadley

LP	1	(Canada) Djustice Sears-Duru	(substituted off) 50'
HK	2	(South Africa) Stephan Coetzee	(substituted off) 75'
TP	3	(Australia) Tim Metcher	(substituted off) 50'
LL	4	(Fiji) Api Naikatini	(substituted off) 62'
RL	5	(New Zealand) Brad Tucker
BF	6	(United States) Samu Manoa	(substituted off) 53'
OF	7	(Canada) Nakai Penny	(substituted off) 62'
N8	8	(United States) Riekert Hattingh
SH	9	(South Africa) JP Smith
FH	10	(United States) Ben Cima	(substituted off) 57'
LW	11	(Canada) Jeff Hassler
IC	12	(United States) Shalom Suniula (c)
OC	13	(Canada) George Barton	(substituted off) 57'
RW	14	(Canada) Brock Staller
FB	15	(England) Mathew Turner
Replacements:
HK	16	(United States) Daniel Trierweiler	(substituted in) 75'
PR	17	(United States) Kellen Gordon	(substituted in) 50'
PR	18	(Canada) Jake Ilnicki	(substituted in) 50'
LK	19	(Belgium) Jérémy Lenaerts	(substituted in) 62'
LF	20	(United States) Eric Duechle	(substituted in) 62'
SH	21	(Canada) Phil Mack	(substituted in) 57'
OB	22	(United States) Roland Suniula	(substituted in) 57'
LF	23	(United States) Vili Toluta’u	(substituted in) 53'
Coach:
(New Zealand) Richie Walker

Most Valuable Player:
JP Smith

Assistant Referees:
Anthony Woodthorpe (England)
Elgan Williams (Wales)

Television Match Official:
Davey Ardrey (United States)

== Post-match ==
The defending champion Seattle Seawolves was once again awarded the "America's Championship Shield", which was changed to a 20-pound (9.1 kg) metal shield in the shape of the MLR logo. Seawolves scrum-half JP Smith was named the MLR Championship Series "man of the match".
