= Julio Cesar Giraldo =

Colombian rugby union player (born 1995)

Julio Cesar Giraldo Giraldo
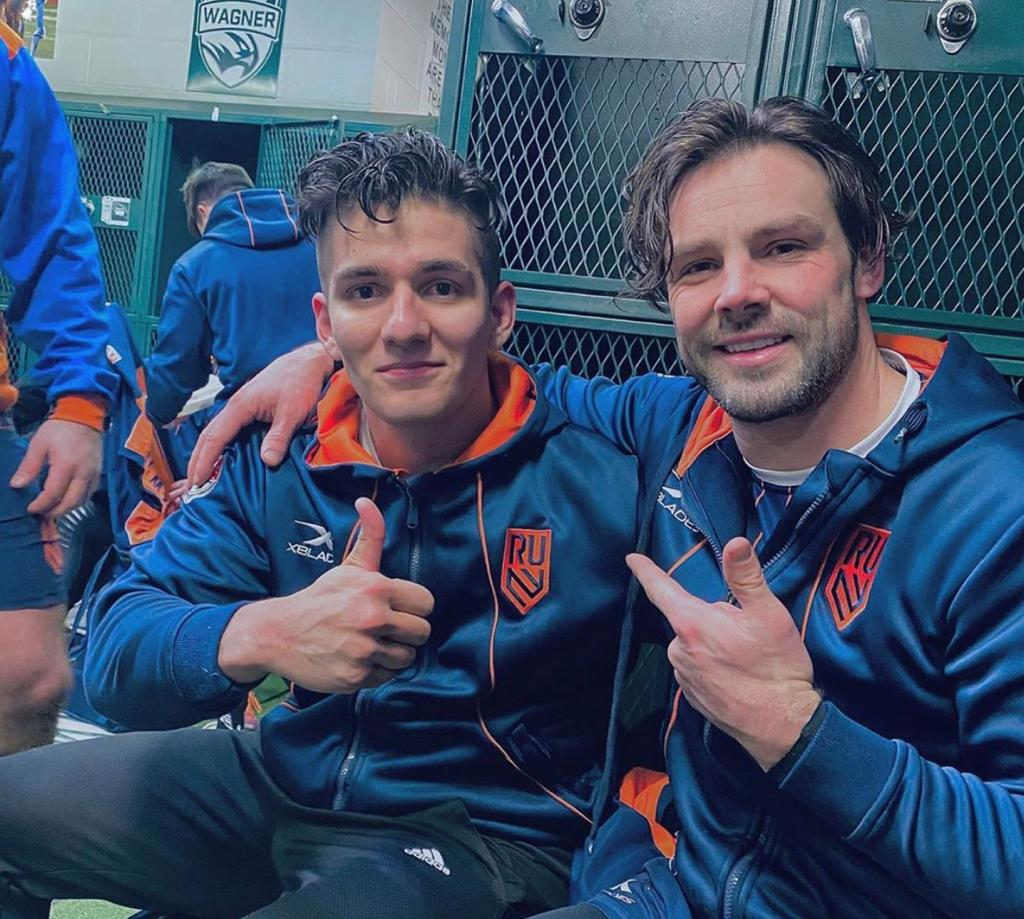
- Giraldo pictured with teammate Ben Foden
- Born: Medellin, Colombia

Rugby union career
Amateur team(s)
Years	Team	Apps	(Points)
2015	Old Blue RFC		
2017	Tec Electrogaz Rugby		
2018	Clamart 92		
2019	Old Blue RFC		
Senior career
Years	Team	Apps	(Points)
2020	Rugby United New York		

Julio Cesar Giraldo Giraldo (born 19 August 1995), is a Colombian professional rugby union player who last played for Rugby United New York in Major League Rugby and Old Blue R.F.C. in the American Rugby Premiership at amateur level. He was the second Colombian to ever play rugby professionally, and the first to play in Major League Rugby.

== Early life ==
Giraldo was born in Medellin, Colombia. He began playing and developed as a rugby player at the Caporos Rugby club in Monteria-Colombia. He joined the club in 2011 and quickly earned a spot on the first team. He had several outstanding performances, and continued playing for his hometown club throughout 2014.

== Career ==
Giraldo moved to the United States on February 9, 2015, at the age of 19, joining Old Blue RFC. Despite having several performances in the D2 side, he was only selected once for the first team. In the summer of 2015, he played rugby league for the New York Knights of the USARL, where he suffered his first major injury.

In September 2017, after two years in the United States, Giraldo traveled to France and joined Tec Electrogaz Rugby in Promotion Honneur (the seventh division of France). He earned a trial at Clamart 92, where he was selected for the team and played in Federal 2 until May 2018.

In 2018, Giraldo went back to the United States due to his new immigration status and rejoined his two former clubs. He did not compete consistently during the rest of 2018. In 2019, he gained a lot of first-team action. The fall season of 2019 was one of Giraldo's best seasons. Despite several injuries (pulled hamstring, bruised shoulder, clavicle fissure, bruised finger tendon) and not being recovered 100%, he managed to perform at a high level.

=== Major League Rugby ===
Giraldo was offered a one-month trial in December 2019 by coach Greg McWilliams at Rugby United New York. In January, he was asked to remain with the training squad for a month. After 60 days of training and two preseason games, he was offered his first professional contract, becoming the first Colombian player to make it to MLR and the second player to play professionally in Colombian rugby history, as well as joining players such as Ben Foden, Mathieu Bastareaud, Dylan Fawsitt, Cathal Marsh, Nate Brakeley, Connor Wallace-Sims, and Paddy Ryan.

Giraldo made his professional rugby debut for Rugby United New York on February 9, 2020, in the first week of the MLR against the New England Free Jacks at Sam Boyd stadium in Las Vegas. He came in from the bench in the first half, replacing an injured Trevor Cassidy. He played 43 minutes, attempting eight tackles with a 100% finishing rate, and also got two turnovers.

== National team ==
Giraldo represented the "Los Tucanes" Colombia under-18 side from 2011-2013, gaining several caps, including a match against Brazil where he scored a try. He was also, at the time, the first and only player from a club from the Caribbean coast to make it to the squad. He was selected for Los Tucanes, the Colombian national under-18 side, where he played from 2011 to 2013.
