= Scott Gale =

Scott Gale may refer to:

- Scott Gale (rugby union) (born 1994), Australian rugby union player
- Scott Gale (rugby league) (1965–2004), Australian rugby league player
