= Nick Boyer =

American rugby union player (b. 1993)

- Full name: Nicklas Swain Boyer
- Born: July 17, 1993 (age 33) Sacramento, California
- Height: 6 ft 3 in (1.91 m)
- Weight: 220 lb (100 kg)
- School: Jesuit High School
- University: University of California

Rugby union career
- Position(s): Scrum-half (XVs); Hooker (7s); Center (7s)
- Current team: San Diego Legion
Amateur team(s)
Years	Team	Apps	(Points)
2011–2016	University of California		
2015	Bedford Athletic		
–c. 2018	Glendale Merlins		
- Correct as of March 16, 2020
Senior career
Years	Team	Apps	(Points)
2018–2019	San Diego Legion	25	(40)
2020	Colorado Raptors	5	(10)
2021	LA Giltinis	0	(0)
2021-	Houston SaberCats	36	(45)
- Correct as of 26 June 2023
International career
Years	Team	Apps	(Points)
2012	United States U20	3	(5)
2016–2017	United States U23		
2016–	USA Selects	5	(5)
2018–	United States	1	(0)
- Correct as of June 11, 2021
National sevens teams
Years	Team		Comps
2018	USA Falcons		1
2018	United States		2
- Correct as of April 4, 2019

Nicklas Swain Boyer (born July 17, 1993) is an American rugby union player who last played as a scrum-half for the San Diego Legion of Major League Rugby (MLR) and the United States men's national team.

Boyer has also represented the United States with the USA Selects and multiple age-grade sides. In rugby sevens, Boyer has played for the United States men's national team and the USA Falcons.

He previously played for the MLR's Colorado Raptors.

== Early life ==
Boyer was born on July 17, 1993, raised in Sacramento, California, and began playing rugby in his youth. Boyer attended Jesuit High School, where he participated in football and wrestling in addition to rugby. Boyer then attended University of California from 2011 until 2016, where he participated in the school's rugby teams in XVs and 7s and won Varsity Cup and Collegiate Rugby Championship titles. In September 2015, Boyer joined Bedford Athletic in England and played with the club in the Midlands 1 East league.

== Club career ==
=== San Diego Legion ===
Boyer was a member of the San Diego Legion team that competed in Major League Rugby's inaugural 2018 season. Boyer made his debut for the Legion on April 22, 2018, starting at scrum-half, in a 39–23 defeat to Seattle. Boyer returned to the Legion for the 2019 season.

=== A new era ===
He decided to join the Colorado Raptors after the 2019 Major League Rugby season. Unfortunately, the covid crisis ended earlier the 2020 season and Boyer made only 5 appearances in a Raptors shirt. After the disappearance of the Colorado raptors, Nick Boyer joined the newly franchise of the LA Giltinis for the 2021 season. After few weeks of competition, he left the team without playing in it and became a Houston Sabercats' player. He can also be seen in a Headliners jersey in the newly formed PR Sevens league as a scrum-half or center.

== International career ==
=== USA Junior All-Americans ===
Boyer made his debut in international play with the United States men's national under-20 team (Junior All-Americans) in 2012, playing with the team when they won the 2012 Junior World Rugby Trophy.

=== USA Collegiate All-Americans ===
In 2016, Boyer was named to the roster of the Men's Collegiate All-Americans (MCAAs) for their August tour of Australia, making his debut in a match against Darling Downs. Boyer also played for the MCAAs in a September 2017 match against Oxford University at Talen Energy Stadium.

=== USA Selects ===
Boyer was first named to the roster of the USA Selects ahead of the inaugural Americas Pacific Challenge (APC) in 2016. Boyer made his debut for the Selects on October 8, 2016, appearing as a substitute, in a 62–12 defeat to Fiji. Boyer made his first start for the Selects on October 12, 2016, scoring his first try, in a 47–37 victory over Canada. Boyer also made a start for the Selects in their third and final match during the 2016 tournament. Ahead of the APC in 2018, Boyer was again named to the roster for the Selects. He made two appearances for the team during the tournament, both in the starting lineup.

=== USA Eagles ===
Boyer made his debut for the USA Eagles on November 17, 2018, appearing as a substitute, in the Eagles' 31–5 victory over Romania during the 2018 end-of-year tests. As of April 2019, this is the only appearance that he has made for the Eagles.

=== Rugby sevens ===
Boyer was selected for the roster of the USA Falcons, the developmental side for the United States men's national rugby sevens team, in January 2018 for the 2018 Sudamérica Rugby Sevens tournament. Also in 2018, Boyer made two appearances for the senior national side during the 2017–18 World Rugby Sevens Series at the 2018 New Zealand Sevens in Hamilton and the 2018 Canada Sevens in Vancouver.
