= Eric Howard =

Canada international rugby union player

- Born: September 5, 1993 (age 33) Ottawa, Ontario, Canada
- Height: 1.78 m (5 ft 10 in)
- Weight: 106 kg (234 lb; 16 st 10 lb)
- School: Earl of March Secondary School
- University: University of Guelph

Rugby union career
- Position: Hooker
Amateur team(s)
Years	Team	Apps	(Points)
2014-17	Ottawa Beavers		
–	Brantford Harlequins		
Senior career
Years	Team	Apps	(Points)
2017-	New Orleans Gold	19	(45)
Provincial / State sides
Years	Team	Apps	(Points)
2016-18	Ontario Blues	12	(15)
International career
Years	Team	Apps	(Points)
2016-	Canada	24	(0)

Eric Gerald Howard (born September 5, 1993) is a Canadian rugby union player. He plays as a hooker for the NOLA Gold of Major League Rugby (MLR) and the Canadian national team.

Howard started his rugby career with the Ottawa Beavers, before joining the Brantford Harlequins in 2014.

In 2017, he signed for the New Orleans Gold team who play in the professional Major League Rugby competition, later going on to captain the team in the 2019 Major League Rugby season.

== Club statistics ==
As of 1 March 2020

Season	Team	Games	Starts	Sub	Tries	Cons	Pens	Drops	Points	Yel	Red
MLR 2018	New Orleans Gold	5	5	0	0	0	0	0	0	1	0
MLR 2019	New Orleans Gold	14	14	0	9	0	0	0	45	0	0
MLR 2020	New Orleans Gold	3	3	0	1	0	0	0	5	0	0
Total		22	22	0	10	0	0	0	50	1	0
