= JP Eloff =

American rugby union player

- Full name: Jean-Pierre Eloff
- Born: 28 May 1991 (age 35) Pretoria, South Africa
- Height: 1.80 m (5 ft 11 in)
- Weight: 86 kg (190 lb; 13 st 8 lb)
- University: Davenport University
- Notable relative: Philip Eloff (brother)

Rugby union career
- Position: Full Back
- Current team: Chicago Hounds
Senior career
Years	Team	Apps	(Points)
2016	Ohio Aviators	4	(20)
2018-2022	New Orleans Gold	36	(211)
2022	Chicago Hounds	15	(5)
- Correct as of 28 December 2020
International career
Years	Team	Apps	(Points)
2016–2018	USA Selects	9	(19)
2016–2017	United States	10	(24)
- Correct as of 28 May 2025

Jean-Pierre "JP" Eloff (born 28 May 1991) is an American rugby union player who plays Fullback for the Chicago Hounds in Major League Rugby (MLR) and also for the United States national rugby union team.

Eloff played college rugby at Davenport University in Grand Rapids, Michigan. He led the Davenport Panthers to a D1-AA title in his freshman year, and was named as the 2011 college player of the year. and was chosen as an All-American for the 2011 National All-Star Championships.

== Professional career ==
Eloff debuted with the U.S. national team at the 2016 Americas Rugby Championship.

Eloff signed with the Ohio Aviators in the newly formed PRO Rugby competition in early 2016. In October 2017, JP Eloff signed with New Orleans Gold for the inaugural season of Major League Rugby.

In September 2018, Eloff was selected for the USA Selects roster for the 2018 Americas Pacific Challenge.

JP Eloff is the younger brother of Philip Eloff, who also played for the U.S. national team at the 2003 and 2007 Rugby World Cups.
