= Shaun Davies (rugby union) =

US international rugby union player

- Born: 21 June 1989 (age 37) Durban, South Africa
- Height: 1.70 m (5 ft 7 in)
- Weight: 81 kg (12 st 11 lb; 179 lb)
- School: Westville Boys' High School
- University: Brigham Young University

Rugby union career
- Position: Scrum-half
- Current team: Colorado Raptors
Senior career
| Years | Team | Apps | (Points) |
| 2016 | Ohio Aviators | 11 | (80) |
| 2018–2019 | Glendale Raptors | 17 | (30) |
- Correct as of 5 April 2020
International career
| Years | Team | Apps | (Points) |
| 2012–2019 | United States | 27 | (23) |
- Correct as of 5 April 2020
Coaching career
- Years: Team
- 2020 – present: Utah Warriors (assistant)
- Correct as of 4 May 2021

Shaun Davies (born 21 June 1989) is a current assistant coach of the Utah Warriors of Major League Rugby (MLR) and former rugby union player who played as a scrum-half.

He played professionally for the Glendale Raptors in Major League Rugby (MLR) and previously for the Ohio Aviators in the short-lived PRO Rugby.

He also played for the United States national rugby union team.

== College rugby ==
Davies played college rugby at BYU in Utah from 2009 to 2012. He won the national championship with BYU in 2009, defeating Cal 25–22 in the final, and was named Man of the Match. Davies led BYU to another national championship in 2012 by defeating Arkansas State 49–42.

After college, he played club rugby with Life University in Georgia.

== Professional rugby career ==
Davies played for the Ohio Aviators in 2016. He played in PRO Rugby's first ever match: a 16–13 Ohio loss at Denver.

== National team ==
Davies earned his first United States national rugby union team cap in June 2012 against the Georgia national team. Davies was considered to have an outside shot of making the U.S. squad for the 2015 Rugby World Cup, but did not make the team. Davies was called up by new U.S. head coach John Mitchell for the June 2016 tests. He was selected for the national team for the 2019 World Cup. Davies retired from international rugby following the 2019 Rugby World Cup.
