= Sam Malcolm =

New Zealand rugby union player

- Full name: Sam Bruce Malcolm
- Born: 25 September 1995 (age 31) Wanganui, New Zealand
- Height: 175 cm (5 ft 9 in)
- Weight: 81 kg (179 lb; 12 st 11 lb)
- School: Wanganui High School

Rugby union career
- Position(s): First five-eighth, Fullback
- Current team: Kamaishi Seawaves
Senior career
Years	Team	Apps	(Points)
2018	West Harbour	17	(147)
2019–2020	Toronto Arrows	21	(212)
2021–	Kamaishi Seawaves	3	(15)
- Correct as of 3 March 2020
Provincial / State sides
Years	Team	Apps	(Points)
2015–2019	Manawatu	27	(53)

Sam Bruce Malcolm (born 25 September 1995) is a New Zealand rugby union player who currently plays for the Toronto Arrows in Major League Rugby (MLR).

His preferred position of choice is first five-eighth but is also known to be an accomplished halfback as well.

== Early career ==
Malcolm attended Wanganui High School and was a member of the 1st XV. He also played touch rugby and rugby sevens for the school. He moved to Palmerston North to attend Massey University's rugby institute and also study an agricommerce degree. He joined the Varsity club.

He has been in the Hurricanes U20s as well as the Manawatu U19s. Malcolm was also selected for the New Zealand University and Hurricanes development sides in 2016. He was selected for the New Zealand national U20s training squad in 2014 and trialled as a halfback.

== Professional rugby ==
He previously played forManawatu in the Mitre 10 Cup and also West Harbour RFC. Then he signed with the Toronto Arrows during their debut in the 2019 Major League Rugby season. His preferred position of choice is first five-eighth but is also known to be an accomplished halfback as well.
