= Brock Staller =

Canada international rugby union player

- Born: Brock Staller; 24 March 1992 (age 34) Surrey, British Columbia
- Height: 1.88 m (6 ft 2 in)
- Weight: 95 kg (209 lb)
- School: Kitsilano Secondary
- University: University of British Columbia

Rugby union career
- Position: Wing / Full Back
- Current team: Seattle Seawolves
Amateur team(s)
Years	Team	Apps	(Points)
- Meraloma RFC
–	UBC Thunderbirds		
–	Westshore RFC		
Senior career
Years	Team	Apps	(Points)
2018-	Seattle Seawolves	28	(307)
- Correct as of 1 March 2020
Provincial / State sides
Years	Team	Apps	(Points)
- British Columbia Bears
International career
Years	Team	Apps	(Points)
2016-	Canada	15	(64)
- Correct as of 4 July 2019

Brock Staller (born 24 March 1992) is a Canadian rugby union player who plays wing for the Seattle Seawolves in Major League Rugby (MLR). He also plays international test rugby for Canada.

== Early life ==
Staller grew up in Surrey, Canada attending Kitsilano Secondary School and played amateur rugby with the Meraloma Rugby Club.

== Rugby career ==
Staller has represented Vancouver in regional play, British Columbia in provincial play and currently represents Canada internationally. Staller is a graduate of the University of British Columbia men's varsity rugby program, having previously attended Douglas College on a golf scholarship in New Westminster, British Columbia. He and his UBC teammates won two consecutive Rounsefell Cups in 2016 and 2017. For two years in a row, Brock was the leading points scorer in the British Columbia Rugby Union Men's premiership.

In 2016, Staller was called-up by Francois Ratier to represent the Canadian men's national team during the Americas Rugby Championship. He earned his first cap in a win against Brazil, started in the non-capped loss to Argentina XV, and closed out the tournament with a start at fullback defeating Chile.

On 3 November 2017 it was announced that Staller would be joining the Seattle Seawolves for their inaugural season in Major League Rugby.

== Club statistics ==
As of 1 March 2020

Season	Team	Games	Starts	Sub	Tries	Cons	Pens	Drops	Points	Yel	Red
MLR 2018	Seattle Seawolves	6	6	0	3	12	7	0	60	1	0
MLR 2019	Seattle Seawolves	18	18	0	6	53	29	0	223	0	0
MLR 2020	Seattle Seawolves	4	3	1	0	3	6	0	24	0	0
Total		28	27	1	9	68	42	0	307	1	0
