= Will Magie =

American rugby union player (born 1992)

- Born: 23 February 1992 (age 34) London, England
- Height: 1.83 m (6 ft 0 in)
- Weight: 84 kg (185 lb)
- University: University of Leeds

Rugby union career
- Position(s): Fly-half, Full-back
- Current team: Indianapolis Impalas
Senior career
Years	Team	Apps	(Points)
2012–13	Otley	5	(4)
2013–14	Ealing Trailfinders	2	(0)
2014–15	Old Albanian	18	(52)
2016	Denver Stampede	12	(113)
2016–2018	Ealing Trailfinders	1	(16)
2017–2019	Glendale Raptors	40	(355)
2019–2020	London Scottish F.C.	15	(44)
2020–2022	Austin Gilgronis	28	
2022–2024	Indianapolis Impalas	6	
- Correct as of 22 May 2024
International career
Years	Team	Apps	(Points)
2011–12	United States under-20	10	(16)
2017–2021	United States	31	(91)
- Correct as of 9 October 2021

William Magie (born 23 February 1992) is a former rugby union player who last played fly-half for the Austin Gilgronis in Major League Rugby. Born in England, he represented United States at international level.

He previously played for London Scottish F.C. in the RFU Championship.

== Early career ==
During his school years, Magie captained the University of Leeds rugby team. Magie also led the United States national under-20 rugby union team to the IRB Junior World Rugby Trophy in 2012.

== Professional rugby career ==
Magie signed his first professional contract in 2013 with the Ealing Trailfinders in the English Championship, England's second division. However, he saw little playing time with Ealing during the 2013–14 season.

Magie signed with the Denver Stampede in early 2016 in the newly-formed PRO Rugby competition. Magie slotted the winning penalty kick to give Denver a 16–13 win over the Ohio Aviators in PRO Rugby's first ever match, a feat for which one magazine named Magie as PRO Rugby's player of the week for the competition's inaugural week.

In 2018, Magie signed with the Glendale Raptors for the inaugural season of Major League Rugby (MLR). By the end of game week 5, Magie was the second-highest points scorer in the league, with a total of 47 points in his first 4 games.
