= Brad Tucker =

New Zealand rugby union player

- Born: 10 September 1992 (age 34) Christchurch, New Zealand
- Height: 1.96 m (6 ft 5 in)
- Weight: 116 kg (18 st 4 lb)
- School: St Bedes College; St Pius X College
- University: Lincoln University
- Notable relative(s): James Tucker (brother), Will Tucker (brother)

Rugby union career
- Position(s): Lock, Blindside Flanker
Senior career
Years	Team	Apps	(Points)
2019–2022	Seattle Seawolves	44	(35)
2023	New York Ironworkers	14	(0)
2024–	Chicago Hounds	15	(0)
- Correct as of 8 July 2025
Provincial / State sides
Years	Team	Apps	(Points)
2016	Waikato	2	(5)
2017	Taranaki	7	(0)
2018	Manawatu	9	(5)
- Correct as of 8 July 2025

Brad Tucker (born 10 September 1992 in Christchurch, New Zealand) is a New Zealand rugby union player. He plays lock and flanker for the Chicago Hounds in Major League Rugby (MLR). He previously played for the Seattle Seawolves where he won an MLR Championship in 2019.

Tucker previously played for a number of New Zealand provincial sides in the Mitre 10 Cup but was unable to secure a Super Rugby contract.

Tucker had a successful season with Seattle, winning the championship and earning a place in the all MLR team and being named player of the season.
