= Mateo Sanguinetti =

Uruguay international rugby union player

- Born: 26 July 1992 (age 34) Montevideo, Uruguay
- Height: 1.85 m (6 ft 1 in)
- Weight: 105 kg (16 st 7 lb; 231 lb)

Rugby union career
- Position: Prop
Senior career
Years	Team	Apps	(Points)
2019	Houston SaberCats	8	(0)
2020, 2022–	Peñarol	1	(0)
2020−2022	Massy		
International career
Years	Team	Apps	(Points)
2014-	Uruguay	80	(20)
- Correct as of 7 September 2023

Mateo Sanguinetti (born 26 July 1992) is a Uruguayan rugby union player. He was named in Uruguay's squad for the 2015 Rugby World Cup. His position is prop.

In December 2018 he signed with professional American club Houston SaberCats for the 2019 Major League Rugby season.
