= Andrés Vilaseca =

Uruguayan rugby union player

- Born: 8 May 1991 (age 35)
- Height: 1.85 m (6 ft 1 in)
- Weight: 82 kg (12 st 13 lb; 181 lb)

Rugby union career
- Position(s): Wing, Centre
Senior career
Years	Team	Apps	(Points)
2019	Austin Elite	9	(39)
2020−2022	Peñarol		
2022–	Vannes		
International career
Years	Team	Apps	(Points)
2013-	Uruguay	75	(80)
- Correct as of 9 September 2023

Andrés Vilaseca (born 8 May 1991) is a Uruguayan rugby union player. He was named in Uruguay's squad for the 2015 Rugby World Cup.
