= Rob Hoadley =

Former English rugby union player/coach

- Born: Robert James Hoadley; 24 March 1980 (age 46) Hammersmith, London, England
- Height: 1.85 m (6 ft 1 in)
- Weight: 97 kg (15 st 4 lb)
- University: St Mary's College

Rugby union career
- Position: Center
Senior career
Years	Team	Apps	(Points)
1999–2004	London Irish	50	(30)
2004–2009	London Wasps	56	(30)
- Correct as of 3 January 2012
Coaching career
- Years: Team
- 2016: San Diego Breakers
- 2018-: San Diego Legion

Rob Hoadley (born 28 March 1980) is an English rugby union former player and current coach. He is the former head coach of the San Diego Legion of Major League Rugby (MLR).

== Professional career ==
Hoadley was born in Hammersmith, London. He joined London Irish in 1999, spending five seasons with the club and winning the Powergen Cup in 2002.

In 2004, Hoadley moved away from London Irish to join rivals London Wasps. During his time at London Wasps the club won the 2004-05 English Premiership (he scored a try in the final as a replacement fullback), 2005–06 Anglo-Welsh Cup, 2006–07 Heineken Cup (he did not play in the final), and 2007–08 English Premiership (he did not play in the final).

== Coaching career ==
Hoadley joined the coaching staff at London Wasps in 2009 as a Defence Coach. Hoadley was appointed Defence Coach for the Wales under-20 team in 2009.

Hoadley was the backs coach for the United States national team during the 2016 Americas Rugby Championship. Hoadley was announced as assistant coach for the San Diego Breakers in early 2016.
