= Connor Wallace-Sims =

American rugby union player

- Born: 29 June 1995 (age 31) Plymouth, England
- Height: 5 ft 10 in (1.78 m)
- Weight: 186 lb (84 kg)
- School: Coombe Dean School
- University: Ivybridge College

Rugby union career
- Position: Wing
Youth career
- 2003-2011: Devonport Services RFC
- 2011-2014: Exeter Chiefs
Amateur team(s)
Years	Team	Apps	(Points)
2013-2015	Canterbury RFC		
2015	Old Blue		
Senior career
Years	Team	Apps	(Points)
2019-present	Rugby United New York	20	(45)
International career
Years	Team	Apps	(Points)
2014	USA u20s		
National sevens teams
Years	Team		Comps
2016	USA		
2018	USA Falcons		

Connor Wallace-Sims (born 29 June 1995) is an English born American professional rugby union player. He plays as a winger for Rugby United New York (RUNY) of Major League Rugby (MLR).

He previously was a part of the professional USA 7s residency programme at Chula Vista, California.
