= Con Foley =

Australian rugby player (born 1992)

- Born: Cornelius Foley; 19 September 1992 (age 34) Brisbane, Queensland, Australia
- Height: 1.87 m (6 ft 1 1/2 in)
- Weight: 90 kg (200 lb; 14 st 2 lb)
- School: Gregory Terrace
- University: University of Queensland

Rugby union career
Amateur team(s)
Years	Team	Apps	(Points)
2012–2018	Uni of Queensland		
2017	Northern Suburbs		
Senior career
Years	Team	Apps	(Points)
2016	North Harbour Rays	6	(15)
2018	Brisbane City	6	(6)
2018–pres.	New Orleans Gold	0	(0)
- Correct as of 14 October 2018
International career
Years	Team	Apps	(Points)
2012	Australia U20	5	(3)
- Correct as of 21 June 2012
National sevens team
Years	Team		Comps
2011–pres.	Australia 7s		43 (309)
- Correct as of 8 April 2018

Cornelius Foley (born 19 September 1992) is a professional rugby union player. He is currently signed to the New Orleans Gold team in the United States and previously played for Australian sides North Harbour and Brisbane City. His usual position is centre or on the wing. Foley has represented Australia in rugby sevens.

== Early life and career ==
Born in Brisbane, Foley attended St. Joseph's College, Gregory Terrace before playing his senior club rugby for the University of Queensland Rugby Club.

== Rugby 7s ==
Con Foley was selected for the Aussie Thunderbolts sevens team at tournaments in Noosa and Samoa before making his international debut at the age of nineteen for Australia 7s at the inaugural 2011 Gold Coast Sevens. He played at the 2013 Rugby Sevens World Cup, where he scored two tries, and at 2014 Commonwealth Games. Foley represented his country at the 2016 Summer Olympics. After five full seasons on the World Sevens Series circuit he decided to return to fifteen-a-side rugby, however he did gain a recall to the national sevens team for the Hong Kong tournament in 2018.

== Rugby 15s ==
In 2012, Foley was selected for the Australia Under 20 team and toured to South Africa where he played in the Junior World Championship. He focused his career on rugby sevens thereafter until late 2016 when he signed with North Harbour to play in Australia's National Rugby Championship (NRC). Foley joined Sydney club Northern Suburbs for the Shute Shield competition in 2017 before returning home to captain University of Queensland for the 2018 Queensland Premier Rugby season. He played NRC with Brisbane City later that year, and signed for the New Orleans Gold ahead of the 2019 Major League Rugby season in the United States.

== Honours ==
- Shawn Mackay Award 2013 – Australian Sevens Player of the Year
