= Gannon Moore =

American rugby union player (b. 1990)

- Born: June 2, 1990 (age 36) Sioux Falls, South Dakota, U.S.
- Height: 6 ft 2 in (188 cm)
- Weight: 220 lb (100 kg)
- School: Lincoln High School
- University: Southwest Minnesota State University

Rugby union career
- Position(s): Centre, Wing
- Current team: Utah Warriors
Senior career
Years	Team	Apps	(Points)
2016	Denver Stampede	4	(0)
2019–	Utah Warriors	11	(25)
- Correct as of May 19, 2019
International career
Years	Team	Apps	(Points)
2018–	United States	4	(5)
- Correct as of February 12, 2021

Gannon Moore (born June 1, 1990) is an American rugby union player who plays for the United States men's national team and the Utah Warriors in Major League Rugby (MLR).

Moore has previously played for North Harbour in the Mitre 10 Cup, the Denver Stampede of PRO Rugby, and the Kansas City Blues. While attending Southwest Minnesota State University, Moore was a running back for four-years on the university football team.

== Early life ==
Moore was born on June 1, 1990, in Sioux Falls, South Dakota, the son of Doug Moore and Celeste Moore.

Moore attended Lincoln High School, where he played football and during that time, he first began playing rugby at the age of 15.

Moore played rugby in high school with Rugby Nebraska's Siouxland United and was named to the Nebraska Selects team.

Moore graduated from high school in 2009 and left Sioux Falls to attend Southwest Minnesota State University (SMSU), where he majored in exercise science. During his four seasons with the SMSU Mustangs football team, he played in all 44 of the team's games, matched the school record for single-season rushing touchdowns (13 in 2009), led the team in total rushing touchdowns (in 2009, 2011, and 2012), and led the team in total receptions (in 2012).

Moore attended an NFL Regional Scouting Combine, but was not drafted and received no contract offers to play in the NFL.

== Club rugby career ==
=== Kansas City Blues ===
In 2013, Moore began playing rugby with the Kansas City Blues, playing in both 7s and XVs.

=== Denver Stampede ===
In March 2016, it was announced that Moore had signed with the Denver Stampede of PRO Rugby, to play in that league's inaugural season. Moore made his debut with the Stampede on April 17, 2016, appearing as a substitute, in the Stampede's 16–13 victory over Ohio.

=== North Harbour and Silverdale ===
Since PRO Rugby was folded after only one season in 2016, Moore has played rugby in New Zealand with North Harbour and Silverdale RFC.

== International rugby career ==
=== USA Eagles ===
Moore made his debut with the USA Eagles on November 3, 2018, starting at center in an un-capped match against the Māori All Blacks—a 59–22 defeat during the end of year tests. Moore earned his first cap for the Eagles on November 10, 2018, starting at wing, in the Eagles' 30–29 victory over Samoa.
