= JP du Plessis =

South African rugby union player (born 1991)

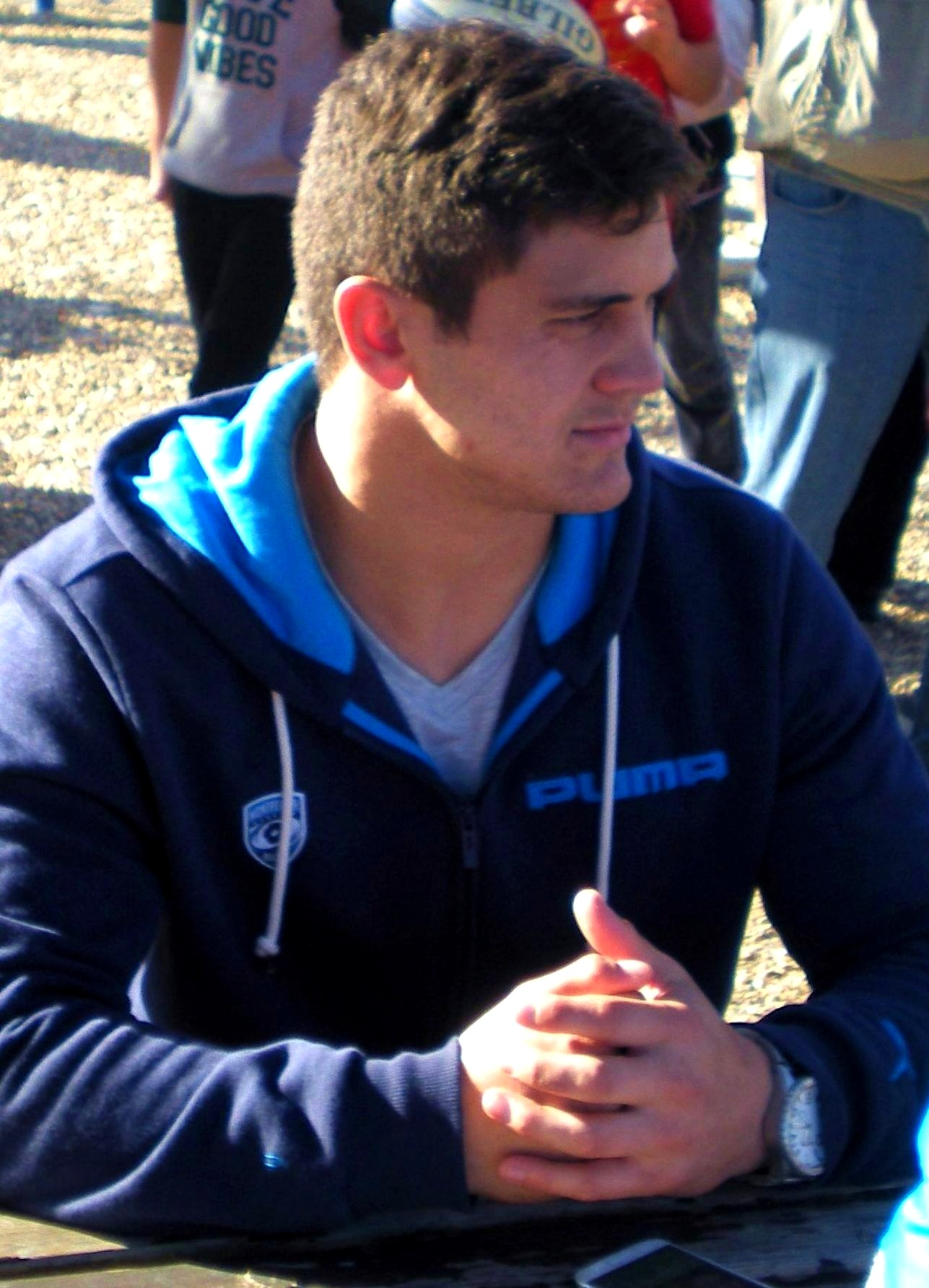
- Full name: Phillipus Jacobus Snyman du Plessis
- Born: 29 April 1991 (age 35) Kroonstad, South Africa
- Height: 1.84 m (6 ft 1/2 in)
- Weight: 100 kg (220 lb; 15 st 10 lb)
- School: Paul Roos Gymnasium, Stellenbosch
- Notable relative: Muller du Plessis

Rugby union career
- Position: Centre
- Current team: NOLA Gold
Youth career
- 2007–2009: Western Province
- 2009–2010: Sydney Roosters (rugby league)
Senior career
Years	Team	Apps	(Points)
2011	Rebels	1	(0)
2012	Western Province	15	(15)
2012	Stormers	2	(0)
2013–2014	Montpellier	1	(0)
2014–2015	Free State Cheetahs	14	(10)
2015	Free State XV	4	(5)
2015–2016	Eastern Province Kings	15	(5)
2016	Southern Kings	7	(5)
2018–2020	San Diego Legion	26	(45)
2021–	New Orleans Gold	68	(70)
- Correct as of 8 July 2025
International career
Years	Team	Apps	(Points)
2009	South Africa Schools		
- Correct as of 20 May 2015

Phillipus Jacobus Snyman 'JP' du Plessis (born 29 April 1991) is a South African professional rugby union player who plays centre position for the New Orleans Gold of Major League Rugby (MLR) in the U.S.

Du Plessis previously played for the San Diego Legion in the MLR.

Du Plessis also played rugby league for the Sydney Roosters and rugby union for Super Rugby sides the Melbourne Rebels and the Stormers, as well as South African Currie Cup sides Western Province and Free State Cheetahs and French Top 14 side Montpellier.

== Early years ==
Du Plessis grew up playing rugby union in South Africa starting his career as school pupil at Reitz High School in Reitz and later moving to Paul Roos Gymnasium in Stellenbosch. He was selected to represent Western Province at the Under-16 Grant Khomo Week tournament in 2007 and represented them at the premier high school rugby union competition in South Africa, the Under-18 Craven Week, in 2009. After that event, he was also named in the 2009 South African Schools squad. He played off the bench in their 86–3 against Italy and scored South Africa's only try in their 13–45 defeat by England three days later.

== Rugby league ==
Du Plessis was then one of two South African youngsters that moved to Australia to join rugby league side the Sydney Roosters, the other being Brian Skosana. He never played for the first team, but did represent their Under-20 side in the 2010 Toyota Cup.

== Rugby union ==
=== Melbourne Rebels ===
In 2010, Du Plessis reverted to rugby union, signing with the Rebels Super Rugby side for their inaugural season in Super Rugby in 2011. He made a single Super Rugby appearance for the Rebels, coming on as a late replacement in their match against the Hurricanes.

=== Western Province / Stormers ===
Du Plessis returned to South Africa in 2011 to sign for the Cape Town-based Western Province. He made seven appearances for the Western Province U21 side during the 2011 Under-21 Provincial Championship, scoring five tries which included four in their 38–42 loss to the Golden Lions U21s in Johannesburg.

Du Plessis was included in the Stormers' 2012 Super Rugby squad. He made two appearances for them off the bench, a 23–13 victory over the Reds in Brisbane and a 17–3 victory over the Force in Perth a week later. He also made seven appearances for Western Province in the 2012 Vodacom Cup and scored a try against the Eastern Province Kings.

Still eligible for play at Under-21 level, he played for the Western Province U21 side during the 2012 Under-21 Provincial Championship and scored one try in their match against the Leopards U21. He was then called up to their Currie Cup side and made nine appearances for them during the 2012 Currie Cup Premier Division. He scored tries in their matches against Griquas and the Blue Bulls to help them finish in third spot on the log to qualify for the semi-finals. However, he didn't feature in the semi-final or the final (which Western Province won by beating the Sharks 25–18) instead reverting to the Under-21 side; he played in both their 19–18 semi-final victory over the Sharks U21 and their 13–22 defeat by the Blue Bulls U21 in the final.

=== Montpellier ===
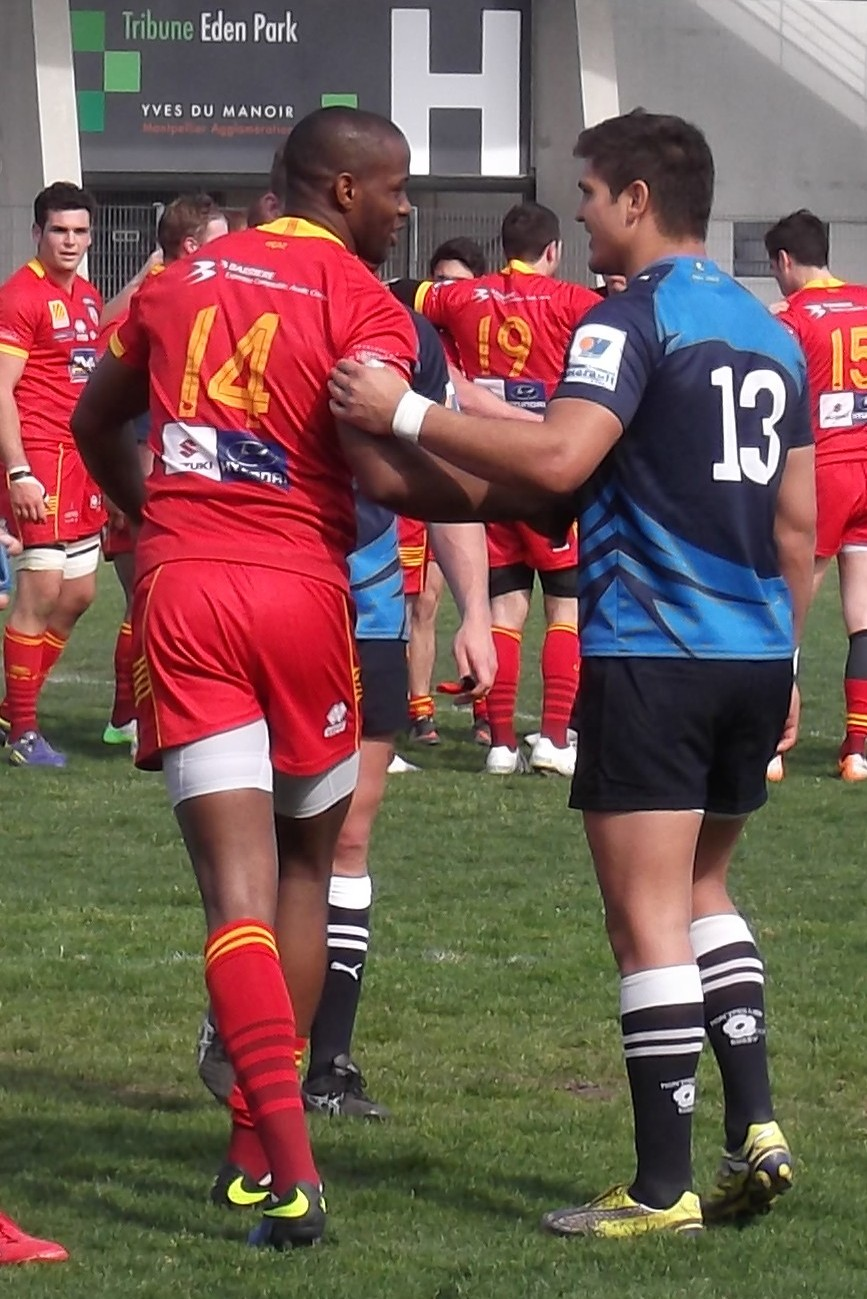
Du Plessis with Wandile Mjekevu

He didn't feature for the Stormers in the 2013 Super Rugby season and opted to move to France to join Top 14 side Montpellier prior to the 2013–14 Top 14 season. However, he failed to break into the first team at Montpellier due to suffering a knee injury and featured in just one match for them, coming on as a late replacement in a 25–18 victory over Grenoble.

=== Free State Cheetahs ===
He returned from France after just one season to join the Free State Cheetahs prior to the 2014 Currie Cup Premier Division. He made five starts and five appearances off the bench for the Bloemfontein-based side, scoring a try in their match against the Pumas as the Free State Cheetahs finished in fifth spot to miss out on the play-offs.

He wasn't named in the Cheetahs Super Rugby squad for the 2015 Super Rugby season, instead playing in four matches for the Free State XV side that played in the 2015 Vodacom Cup competition.

=== Eastern Province Kings ===
Du Plessis was named in the Griquas squad for the 2015 Currie Cup qualification tournament, but didn't feature for them at all, instead joining Port Elizabeth-based side Eastern Province Kings prior to the 2015 Currie Cup Premier Division season.
