= Stephan Coetzee =

South African rugby union player

- Full name: Stephanus Hendrik Coetzee
- Born: 9 January 1992 (age 34) Worcester, South Africa
- Height: 1.85 m (6 ft 1 in)
- Weight: 105 kg (231 lb; 16 st 7 lb)
- School: Paarl Boys' High School

Rugby union career
- Position: Hooker
- Current team: Seattle Seawolves
Youth career
- 2008–2013: Western Province
Senior career
Years	Team	Apps	(Points)
2013–2014	Western Province	17	(0)
2014	Stormers	7	(0)
2015	Griquas	1	(0)
2015	Cheetahs	11	(0)
2016–2017	Sharks XV	23	(25)
2017	Sharks	3	(0)
2017–2018	Southern Kings	18	(0)
2019–present	Seattle Seawolves	18	(40)
- Correct as of 6 May 2018

Stephanus Hendrik Coetzee (born 9 January 1992 in Worcester) is a South African rugby union player for the Seattle Seawolves in Major League Rugby (MLR) in the United States. His regular playing position is hooker.

== Career ==
=== Youth ===
Coetzee represented Western Province at various youth levels, playing at the Under-16 Grant Khomo Week in 2008, the Under-18 Academy Week in 2009 and the Under-18 Craven Week in 2010. He joined the Western Province Rugby Institute in 2011 and played for Western Province U19 in the 2011 Under-19 Provincial Championship competition and for Western Province U21 in the 2012 and 2013 Under-21 Provincial Championship competitions, winning the competition in 2013 and scoring two tries during the season.

=== Western Province / Stormers ===
He was included in the Western Province squad for the 2013 Vodacom Cup and made his senior debut when he started in their opening match of the season against neighbours Boland Cavaliers in Ceres. He played in eight matches during the competition, starting six of them.

After one more appearance during the 2014 Vodacom Cup, Coetzee was flown to New Zealand to link up with the Stormers' Super Rugby squad for their match against the Chiefs, following a torn calf muscle suffered by first-choice hooker Scarra Ntubeni. Coetzee was subsequently named on the bench for the clash.

=== Griquas ===
He moved to Kimberley for the 2015 season to join Griquas.

=== Seattle Seawolves ===
Coetzee joined Major League Rugby side Seattle Seawolves prior to the 2019 season., having a prominent performance with 8 tries assists in regular season and qualifying seawolves to playoff for the second time.
