= Jordan Manihera =

- Full name: Jordan Mark Manihera
- Born: 8 May 1993 (age 33) Auckland, New Zealand
- Height: 1.95 m (6 ft 5 in)
- Weight: 115 kg (18 st 2 lb; 254 lb)
- School: Westlake Boys High School

Rugby union career
- Position: Blindside Flanker
- Current team: Waikato
Senior career
Years	Team	Apps	(Points)
2013–15	North Harbour	23	(15)
2014	Blues	2	(0)
2016−2019	Waikato	29	(50)
2019	San Diego Legion	13	(20)
- Correct as of 25 February 2021
International career
Years	Team	Apps	(Points)
2013	New Zealand U20	5	(10)
2017	Māori All Blacks	1	(0)
- Correct as of 25 February 2021

Jordan Manihera (born 8 May 1993) is a New Zealand rugby union player who currently plays as a flanker for the San Diego Legion in the MLR. He also played for Waikato in the ITM Cup and the Blues in Super Rugby.

== Career ==
Manihera is a native of Auckland and came up through the ranks of his province North Harbour, captaining their Under 20 side to the 2012 North Championship title. He debuted for Harbour in a victory over Tasman in 2012 and went on to establish himself as a regular during the 2013 ITM Cup, where he made a total of 8 appearances accompanied by 2 tries.

Although not initially selected in either the Blues regular squad or wider training group for the 2014 Super Rugby season, an injury to young, Auckland flanker Joe Edwards saw Manihera take his place. He was penciled in for a first super rugby game when the Blues took on the Crusaders in their second match of the season, however captain Luke Braid recovered from injury to take his place in the starting fifteen. He was also later named in the Blues 27-man group for their 2 match tour of South Africa.

== International ==
Manihera was a part of the New Zealand Under-20 squad which competed in the 2013 IRB Junior World Championship in France.
