= Cathal Marsh =

- Born: Cathal Marsh; 10 January 1992 (age 34) Dublin, Ireland
- Height: 1.78 m (5 ft 10 in)
- Weight: 85 kg (13 st 5 lb)
- School: St Michael's College
- University: Trinity College, Dublin

Rugby union career
- Position: Fly-half
- Current team: Rugby United New York
Amateur team(s)
Years	Team	Apps	(Points)
2020-	Terenure College RFC		
Senior career
Years	Team	Apps	(Points)
2013–2018	Leinster	25	(22)
2019–2020	Rugby United New York	19	(112)
- Correct as of 28 December 2020
International career
Years	Team	Apps	(Points)
2011–2012	Ireland U20	8	(0)
- Correct as of 11 June 2012

Cathal Marsh is a former Irish rugby union player who currently plays for Terenure College RFC in the Energia All Ireland League. His preferred position is fly-half. He previously played for Leinster Rugby.

== Professional Rugby career ==
It was announced in April 2015 that he had been awarded a senior contract with Leinster Rugby following completion of his time in the academy, having previously played with the Leinster senior team, making his debut in April 2013 against Zebre.
