= Scott Gale (rugby union) =

Australian rugby union player

- Born: 24 October 1994 (age 32) Albury, New South Wales, Australia
- Height: 1.67 m (5 ft 6 in)
- Weight: 72 kg (11 st 5 lb; 159 lb)
- School: St Joseph's College, Nudgee

Rugby union career
- Position: Scrum-half
- Current team: NOLA Gold
Senior career
Years	Team	Apps	(Points)
2014–2016	Reds	5	(0)
2014–2015	Queensland Country	5	(0)
2016	Greater Sydney Rams	4	(6)
2017	Kamaishi Seawaves	8	(20)
2018	Brisbane City	5	(0)
2018–present	NOLA Gold	0	(0)
- Correct as of 17 March 2020

Scott Gale (born 24 October 1994) is an Australian rugby union player who plays for NOLA Gold in Major League Rugby (MLR) in the United States.

He previously played for the Queensland Reds in the Super Rugby competition and for Japanese club Kamaishi Seawaves as well as several teams in Australia's National Rugby Championship. His usual position is scrumhalf.
