= American Raptors =

Former professional rugby union team

- Founded: 2006; 20 years ago
- Disbanded: 2024; 2 years ago
- Location: Glendale, Colorado, U.S.
- Ground: Infinity Park
- Most caps: Luke White (31) (MLR); Three players (24) (SRA)
- Top scorer: Will Magie (130) (MLR); Lucas González Amorosino (81) (SRA)
- Most tries: John Ryberg (16) (MLR); Three players (5) (SRA)
- League(s): Major League Rugby; Super Rugby Americas
- 2024 SRA: 6th Playoffs: DNQ
Team kit

Official website
- americanraptors.com

The American Raptors were a professional rugby union team that was based in Glendale, Colorado. The team played in two seasons of the transcontinental Super Rugby Americas competition from 2023 to 2024, before withdrawing from professional rugby ahead of the 2025 season.

Established as the amateur "Glendale Raptors" in 2006, the team became a professional club upon joining Major League Rugby as a founding member in 2017, but they played there only three years, competing as the "Colorado Raptors" in their final shortened season of 2020 before withdrawing from the league.

After Major League Rugby, the team renamed themselves the "Colorado XOs" and turned their attention to developing rugby players from athletes originally from other sports, before becoming the "American Raptors" in 2021.

== History ==
The Glendale Raptors were founded as an amateur rugby club in 2006. They won the national Division I Championship in 2011, and were back-to-back winners of the Pacific Rugby Premiership in 2015 and 2016.

=== Major League Rugby ===
Glendale Raptors kit of 2018

In 2017, the Raptors were accepted into the professional Major League Rugby competition. The amateur Glendale teams were renamed the Glendale Merlins before the inaugural MLR season in 2018. The Raptors finished the MLR regular season in first place in 2018, but lost the Championship final to Seattle. In 2019, the Raptors finished the regular season in sixth place and did not play in the finals.

The team was renamed the Colorado Raptors ahead of the 2020 season but the season was shortened and eventually cancelled due to impacts of the COVID-19 pandemic.

The Raptors announced their departure from Major League Rugby, effective May 2, 2020, stating that the number of foreign players and the higher proportion of foreign to American players in the league no longer best served the goal of developing American players who could compete successfully in the Rugby World Cup. The Raptors therefore chose to withdraw from the league to better focus their efforts on the development of American players who could compete on an international stage.

=== Super Rugby Americas ===
In June 2022, the Raptors played in the "Challenge Cup of the Americas" against Canadians UBC Old Boys Ravens and South Americans Peñarol Rugby and Jaguares XV, before joining the Super Rugby Americas competition for the 2023 and 2024 seasons.

=== Team names ===
Name	Period
Glendale Raptors	2006–2019
Colorado Raptors	2019–2020
Colorado XOs	2020–2021
American Raptors	2021–2024

=== Head coaches ===
- David Williams (2018–2019)
- Peter Borlase (2019–2020)
- Paul Emerick (2022)
- Sarah Chobot (2023-2024)
- Mose Timoteo (2024)

=== Captains ===
- Shaun Davies (2018–2019)
- Luke White (2019–2020)

== Records ==
=== Season standings in Major League Rugby ===
Season	Conference	Regular season										Postseason						
Season	Conference	Pos	Pld	W	D	L	F	A	+/−	BP	Pts	Pld	W	L	F	A	+/−	Result
Glendale Raptors
2018	—N/a	1st	8	7	0	1	249	165	+84	6	34	2	1	1	53	44	+9	Won Semifinal (Utah Warriors) 31–21; Lost final 23–19 (Seattle Seawolves)
2019	—N/a	6th	16	7	2	7	456	463	−7	11	43	—N/a	—N/a	—N/a	—N/a	—N/a	—N/a	Did not qualify
Colorado Raptors
2020 (Note: 2020 regular season shortened and playoffs cancelled due to the COVID-19 pandemic.)	Western	8th	5	2	0	3	98	130	-32	1	9	-	-	-	-	-	-	Cancelled
Totals			29	16	2	11	803	758	+45	18	86	2	1	1	53	44	+9	1 postseason appearance

=== Season standings in Super Rugby Americas ===
Season	Regular season										Postseason						
Season	Pos	Pld	W	D	L	F	A	+/−	BP	Pts	Pld	W	L	F	A	+/−	Result
American Raptors
2023	6th	12	2	0	10	282	458	–176	8	16	—N/a	—N/a	—N/a	—N/a	—N/a	—N/a	Did not qualify
2024	6th	12	3	0	9	222	443	–221	5	17	—N/a	—N/a	—N/a	—N/a	—N/a	—N/a	Did not qualify
Totals		24	5	0	19	504	901	–397	13	33	—N/a	—N/a	—N/a	—N/a	—N/a	—N/a	—N/a

== Home field ==
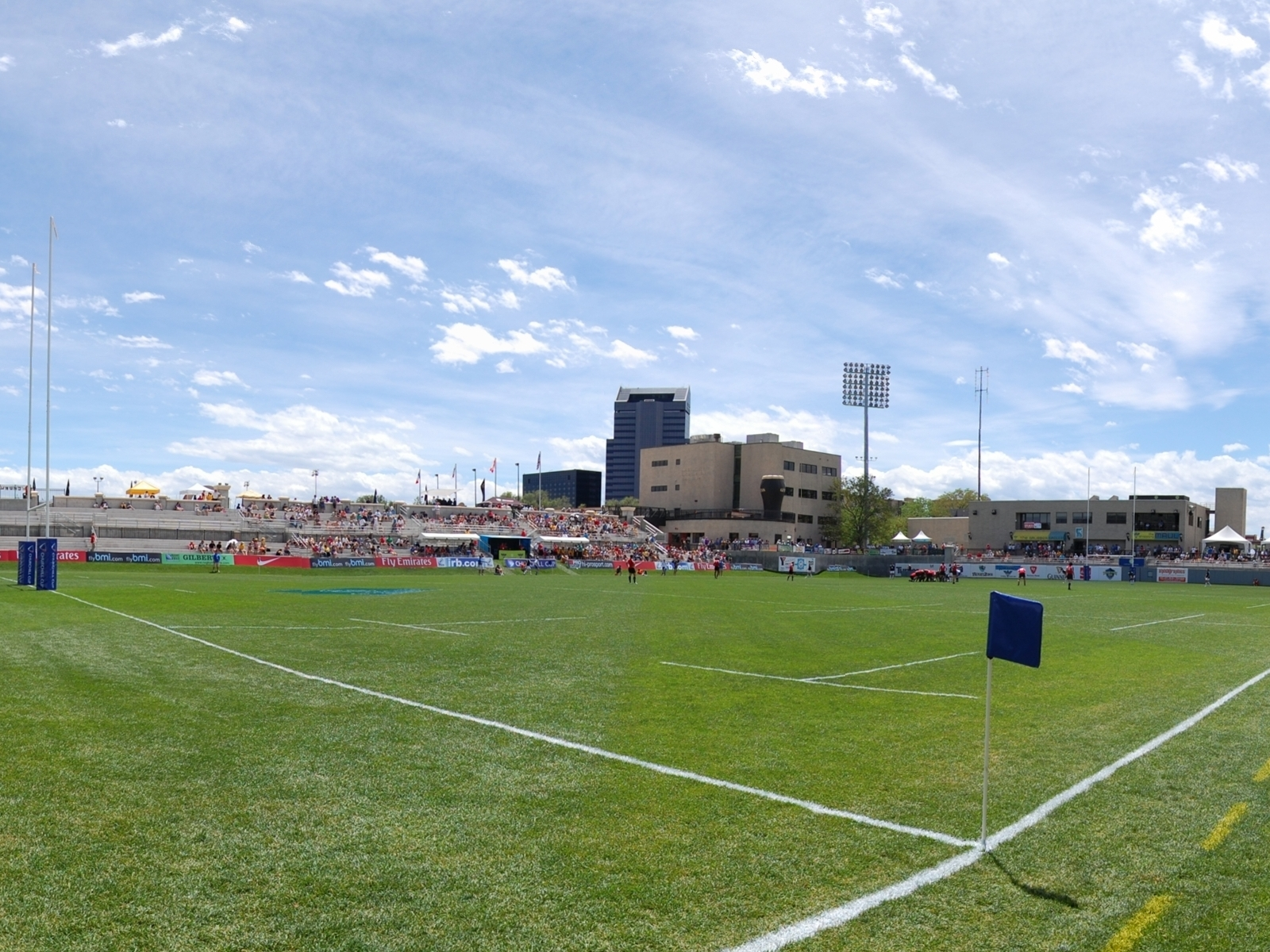
Raptors home field, Infinity Park

The team plays at Infinity Park, the first rugby-specific, municipally owned stadium in the United States.

== Sponsorship ==
Season	Kit manufacturer	Shirt sponsor
2018–2019	XBlades	None
2020	Paladin Sports	None

=== Honors ===
- Major League Rugby
  - Runner-up: 2018
  - Playoff appearances: 2018

== 2018 season ==
Date	Opponent	Home/Away	Result
March 10	New Orleans Gold°	Home	Won, 38–14
March 30	Utah Warriors°	Away	Won, 42–15
April 7	New York Athletic Club RFC°	Away	Won, 35–22
April 21	Austin Elite	Home	Won, 41–26
April 28	Seattle Seawolves	Away	Won, 19–15
May 5	Utah Warriors	Away	Won, 36–29
May 13	San Diego Legion	Home	Won, 31–27
June 3	New Orleans Gold	Away	Won, 41–10
June 8	Houston SaberCats	Home	Won, 37–24
June 16	Seattle Seawolves	Home	Won, 33–11
June 23	San Diego Legion	Away	Lost, 5–23
June 30	Utah Warriors°°	Home	Won, 34–21
July 7	Seattle Seawolves°°°	Neutral	Lost, 19–23

° = Preseason game
°° = Playoff Semifinal
°°° = Final at Torero Stadium in San Diego, California

== 2019 season ==
=== Exhibition ===
Date	Opponent	Home/Away	Location	Result
August 17, 2018	USA Collegiate All-Americans	Home	Infinity Park	Lost, 10–55
September 16, 2018	Ontario Arrows	Away	York Lions Stadium	Lost, 18–40
October 6, 2018	Denver Barbarians	Home	Infinity Park	Won, 81–7
October 13, 2018	Utah Warriors	Home	Infinity Park	Postponed
October 20, 2018	Utah Warriors	Away		Postponed
October 27, 2018	Rugby Americas team	Home	Infinity Park	Lost, 31–50
January 13, 2019	San Diego Legion	Away	Torero Stadium	Won, 38–31
January 19, 2019	Houston SaberCats	Away	Constellation Field	Won, 36–21

=== Regular season ===
Date	Opponent	Home/Away	Location	Result
January 27	Seattle Seawolves	Away	Starfire Stadium	Lost, 18–20
February 2	New Orleans Gold	Away	Archbishop Shaw Stadium	Lost, 31–40
February 17	Austin Elite	Away	Dell Diamond	Won, 24–13
February 23	Utah Warriors	Away	Zions Bank Stadium	Draw, 26–26
March 2	Toronto Arrows	Home	Infinity Park	Won, 22–0
March 9	Austin Elite	Home	Infinity Park	Won, 38–19
March 16	San Diego Legion	Home	Infinity Park	Draw, 28–28
March 24	Rugby United New York	Away	MCU Park	Lost, 19–31
March 30	New Orleans Gold	Home	Infinity Park	Won, 34–33
April 6	Houston SaberCats	Home	Infinity Park	Won, 52–44
April 20	San Diego Legion	Away	Torero Stadium	Lost, 15–46
April 26	Rugby United New York	Home	Infinity Park	Won, 20–16
May 4	Utah Warriors	Home	Infinity Park	Won, 64–22
May 18	Seattle Seawolves	Home	Infinity Park	Lost, 36–53
May 26	Toronto Arrows	Away	Lamport Stadium	Lost, 12–40
May 29	Houston SaberCats	Away	Aveva Stadium	Lost, 17–32

== 2020 season ==
On March 12, 2020, MLR announced the season would go on hiatus immediately for 30 days due to fears surrounding the 2019–2020 coronavirus pandemic. It was cancelled the following week

=== Regular season ===
Date	Opponent	Home/Away	Location	Result
February 8	Houston SaberCats	Away	Aveva Stadium	Lost, 12–21
February 16	San Diego Legion	Neutral	Las Vegas Ballpark	Lost, 22-49
February 22	New Orleans Gold	Home	Infinity Park	Lost, 20-27
February 29	Utah Warriors	Home	Infinity Park	Won, 22-14
March 6	Toronto Arrows	Home	Infinity Park	Won, 22-19
March 15	Old Glory DC	Away	Cardinal Stadium	Cancelled
March 21	Austin Gilgronis	Home	Infinity Park	Cancelled
March 29	Seattle Seawolves	Away	Starfire Sports Complex	Cancelled
April 4	New England Free Jacks	Away	Union Point Sports Complex	Cancelled
April 18	Houston SaberCats	Home	Infinity Park	Cancelled
April 25	Rugby United New York	Away	MCU Park	Cancelled
May 2	Rugby ATL	Home	Infinity Park	Cancelled
May 8	Utah Warriors	Away	Zions Bank Stadium	Cancelled
May 17	Austin Gilgronis	Away	Round Rock Multipurpose Complex	Cancelled
May 24	Seattle Seawolves	Home	Infinity Park	Cancelled
May 30	San Diego Legion	Home	Infinity Park	Cancelled

== See also ==
- Glendale Merlins – Formed in 2017, when the club's top side moved to Major League Rugby.
- Denver Stampede – the now defunct PRO Rugby team that played at Infinity Park in Glendale during 2016.
