= Paddy Ryan (rugby union, born 1988) =

Australian rugby union player

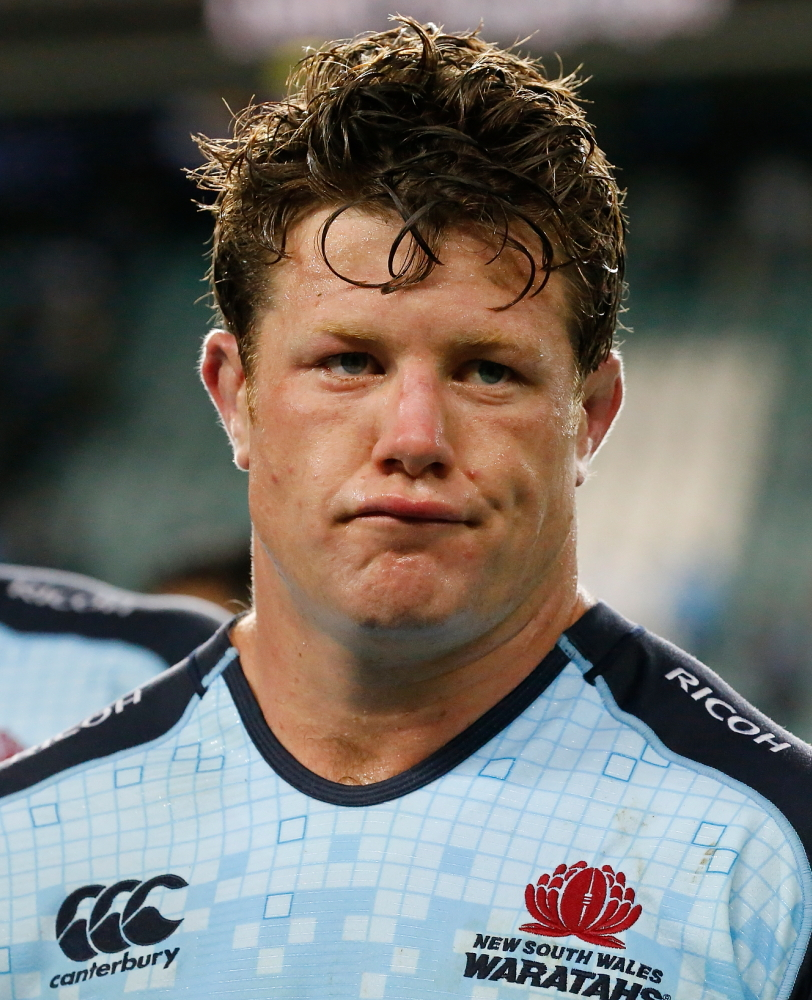
- Born: Patrick Ryan; 9 August 1988 (age 38) Tamworth, New South Wales, Australia
- Height: 189 cm (6 ft 2 in)
- Weight: 120 kg (18 st 13 lb; 265 lb)
- School: St Joseph's College, Hunters Hill

Rugby union career
- Position: Prop
Senior career
| Years | Team | Apps | (Points) |
| 2014 | Sydney Stars | 8 | (10) |
| 2016–18 | NSW Country Eagles | 22 | (10) |
| 2018–21 | Munakata Sanix Blues | 26 | (10) |
| 2018 2021–22 | San Diego Legion | 32 | (20) |
| 2023– | Ricoh Black Rams | 52 | (10) |
- Correct as of 21 February 2021
Super Rugby
| Years | Team | Apps | (Points) |
| 2011–18 2022, 2024 | Waratahs | 110 | (15) |
- Correct as of 31 May 2024
International career
| Years | Team | Apps | (Points) |
| 2012–14 | Australia | 3 | (0) |
- Correct as of 8 June 2014

Paddy Ryan (born 9 August 1988) is an Australian rugby union player who plays as a tight-head prop. Ryan played eight seasons for the New South Wales Waratahs, where he surpassed one hundred caps in Super Rugby. He was also capped for the Australian national team.

== Early life ==
Ryan was born and raised in Tamworth in northern New South Wales. He went to St. Nicholas primary school before attending St Joseph's College, Hunters Hill in Sydney, Australia as a boarding student.

== Professional rugby career ==
Ryan made his senior debut for the Waratahs during the 2011 Super Rugby season against the Chiefs. Leaving the Waratahs in 2018, Ryan subsequently played for the Munakata Sanix Blues in the Japan Rugby League One, and the San Diego Legion in Major League Rugby (MLR). Ryan re-signed for the Waratahs in 2022.
