= 2022 Major League Rugby season =

Fifth season of Major League Rugby

- Countries: United States (12 teams); Canada (1 team)
- Date: February 5 – June 25
- Champions: Rugby New York (1st title)
- Runners-up: Seattle Seawolves
- Matches played: 109
- Highest attendance: 3,608; Utah Warriors vs Dallas Jackals (March 5, 2022)
- Tries scored: 772 (average 7.1 per match)

Official website
- majorleague.rugby

The 2022 Major League Rugby season was the fifth season of Major League Rugby, the professional rugby union competition sanctioned by USA Rugby. The regular season began on February 5, 2022.

The Dallas Jackals made their debut this season, having postponed their inaugural season from 2021.

MLR added Television Match Officials (TMO) to assist in-game referees with making the correct decisions during all matches.

== Teams and format ==
Locations of teams in Major League Rugby
Western Conference Eastern Conference

Conference	Club	Metro area	Stadium	Capacity	Coach	Captain
Western Conference	Austin Gilgronis	Austin, Texas	Bold Stadium	5,036	(New Zealand) Sam Harris	(United States) Bryce Campbell
Western Conference	Dallas Jackals	Dallas, Texas	Choctaw Stadium	48,114	(Scotland) Elaine Vassie (interim)	(England) Chris Pennell
Western Conference	Houston SaberCats	Houston, Texas	Aveva Stadium	4,000	(South Africa) Pote Human	(South Africa) Dean Muir
Western Conference	LA Giltinis	Los Angeles, California	Los Angeles Memorial Coliseum	77,500	(Australia) Stephen Hoiles	(Australia) Dave Dennis
Western Conference	San Diego Legion	San Diego, California	SDSU Sports Deck	3,000	(New Zealand) Danny Lee	(United States) Nate Augspurger
Western Conference	Seattle Seawolves	Seattle, Washington	Starfire Stadium (Note: Starfire Stadium is in the Seattle suburb of Tukwila, Washington.)	4,500	(Ireland) Allen Clarke	(United States) Riekert Hattingh
Western Conference	Utah Warriors	Salt Lake City, Utah	Zions Bank Stadium	5,000	(United States) Shawn Pittman (1-7) (United States) Brandon Sparks (Interim, 8–18)	(United States) Bailey Wilson
Eastern Conference	New England Free Jacks	Boston, Massachusetts	Veterans Memorial Stadium	5,000	(South Africa) Scott Mathie	(Canada) Josh Larsen
Eastern Conference	New Orleans Gold	New Orleans, Louisiana	Gold Mine	10,000	(Samoa) Kane Thompson	(United States) Cam Dolan
Eastern Conference	Old Glory DC	Washington, D.C.	Segra Field	5,000	(New Zealand) Andrew Douglas (1-7) (Australia) Nate Osborne (9-18)	(Samoa) Danny Tusitala
Eastern Conference	Rugby New York	New York, New York	Cochrane Stadium	4,000	(New Zealand) Marty Veale	(United States) Nate Brakeley
Eastern Conference	Rugby ATL	Atlanta, Georgia	Silverbacks Park (Note: Silverbacks Park is in the Atlanta suburb of Doraville, Georgia.)	5,000	(New Zealand) Stephen Brett	(Canada) Matt Heaton (South Africa) Ryan Nell
Eastern Conference	Toronto Arrows	Toronto, Ontario; Langford, British Columbia (Note: Toronto played their match against the LA Giltinis in Langford, BC.)	York Lions Stadium; Starlight Stadium	4,000; 6,000	(Australia) Peter Smith	(Canada) Mike Sheppard

== Regular season ==
The regular season consisted of 18 weeks, with each team playing 16 matches, beginning on February 5, 2022 and ending on June 5.

=== Standings ===
MLR Eastern Conference
Pos	Team	Pld	W	D	L	PF	PA	PD	TF	TA	TB	LB	Pts	Qualification
1	New England Free Jacks (SF)	16	13	0	3	454	328	+126	63	45	8	2	62	Eastern Conference Finals
2	Rugby ATL	16	11	0	5	468	340	+128	64	43	11	2	57	Eastern Conference Semi-Finals
3	Rugby New York (C)	16	11	0	5	433	408	+25	63	57	10	2	56	Eastern Conference Semi-Finals
4	Toronto Arrows	16	8	0	8	414	390	+24	53	56	7	2	41	
5	New Orleans Gold	16	4	0	12	358	517	−159	50	72	6	3	25	
6	Old Glory DC	16	3	0	13	423	591	−168	66	85	8	3	23	

Updated to match(es) played on June 6, 2022. Source:
Rules for classification: If teams are level at any stage, tiebreaker criteria are as follows (coin tosses or draw of lots will be used if those below fail):
1. number of matches won
2. the difference between points for and points against
3. the number of tries scored
4. the most points scored
5. the difference between tries for and tries against
6. the fewest red cards received
7. the fewest yellow cards received
  (C) Champions; (SF) Losing semi-finalists

MLR Western Conference
Pos	Team	Pld	W	D	L	PF	PA	PD	TF	TA	TB	LB	Pts	Qualification
1	Austin Gilgronis (Note: Austin Gilgronis & LA Giltinis were disqualified from any 2022 postseason play.) (D)	16	12	0	4	475	229	+246	64	27	9	1	58	Disqualified from postseason play
2	LA Giltinis (D)	16	11	0	5	443	283	+160	61	36	9	1	54	Disqualified from postseason play
3	Houston SaberCats (SF)	16	9	0	7	408	393	+15	61	53	8	4	48	Western Conference Finals
4	Seattle Seawolves (RU)	16	9	0	7	435	354	+81	54	45	6	4	46	Western Conference Semi-Finals
5	San Diego Legion	16	8	0	8	475	428	+47	59	54	8	3	43	Western Conference Semi-Finals
6	Utah Warriors	16	5	0	11	424	395	+29	57	56	6	7	33	
7	Dallas Jackals	16	0	0	16	198	752	−554	27	112	2	2	4	

Updated to match(es) played on June 6, 2022. Source:
Rules for classification: If teams are level at any stage, tiebreaker criteria are as follows (coin tosses or draw of lots will be used if those below fail):
1. number of matches won
2. the difference between points for and points against
3. the number of tries scored
4. the most points scored
5. the difference between tries for and tries against
6. the fewest red cards received
7. the fewest yellow cards received
  (D) Disqualified from postseason play; (SF) Losing semi-finalist; (RU) Runners-up.
  Notes:

=== Matches ===
The following are the match results for the 2022 Major League Rugby regular season:

Home \ Away	AUS	DAL	HOU	LA	NE	NO	DC	ATL	NY	SD	SEA	TOR	UTA
Austin Gilgronis		43–7	43–5	22–9	17–25		57–12			44–28	17–6		24–10
Dallas Jackals	3–57		33–38	12–56		26–32			5–41	14–53	12–34		5–33
Houston SaberCats	14–29	31–6		21–11					7–10	20–31	21–19	29–17	31–27
LA Giltinis	10–8	47–7	17–12		19–15				43–0	26–13	27–35		19–28
NE Free Jacks						33–29	26–20	15–10	14–21		22–20	21–15	33–17
New Orleans Gold	10–32				13–24		50–21	9–14	19–30	12–42		23–24	
Old Glory DC		50–10	42–59		25–41	22–31		13–27	49–59			5–29	22–21
Rugby ATL	29–14		29–22	19–31	27–41	45–19	55–22		31–36			34–23	
Rugby NY					29–38	36–28	35–31	3–38		26–23	30–22	10–14	
San Diego Legion	21–35	37–29	24–34	31–27			24–12	17–30			28–31		31–29
Seattle Seawolves	18–25	74–7	43–36	12–31		24–25				34–32		21–8	20–17
Toronto Arrows		57–0		16–31	33–18	53–36	32–27	14–20	17–41				
Utah Warriors	22–8	69–22	12–28	32–39				44–26		25–40	14–20	24–27	

Updated to match(es) played on June 5, 2022
Colors: Blue: home team win; Yellow: draw; Red: away team win.

=== Eastern Conference Extra Matches ===
Home \ Away	NE	NO	DC	ATL	NY	TOR
NE Free Jacks		57–5				
New Orleans Gold				17–34		
Old Glory DC						
Rugby ATL						
Rugby United NY	26–29					
Toronto Arrows			35–50			

Updated to match(es) played on June 5, 2022
Colors: Blue: home team win; Yellow: draw; Red: away team win.

=== Scheduled matches ===
==== Week 1 (February 5–6) ====
February 5	(1 BP) Rugby ATL	55–22	Old Glory DC	Silverbacks Park
15:00 EST	Try: Marko Janse van Rensburg 19'; Austin White 36'; Daemon Torres (2) 48', 58'; Te Rangatira Waitokia 64'; Duncan van Schalkwyk 65'; Joaquín de la Vega Mendía 72'; Con: Joaquín de la Vega Mendía (7) 9', 35', 49', 59', 65', 66', 73'; Pen: Joaquín de la Vega Mendía (2) 8', 34'	Report	Try: Danny Tusitala 30'; Jamason Faʻanana-Schultz 42'; Mike Dabulas 50'; Con: William Talataina (2) 31', 43'; Pen: William Talataina 31'	Referee: Federico Anselmi (UAR) Assistants: Dave Edwards (USAR) & Cisco Lopez (USAR) TMO: Amelia Luciano (USAR) Man of the Match: Will Leonard (Rugby ATL)

February 5	(1 BP) Austin Gilgronis	43–7	Dallas Jackals	Bold Stadium
18:00 CST	Try: Julián Domínguez 16'; Robbie Coetzee (2) 24', 39'; Jake Turnbull 51'; Penalty try 63'; Kyle Breytenbach 80'; Con: Mack Mason (2/2) 17', 25'; Will Magie (2/2) 40', 80'; Automatic conversion 63'; Pen: Mack Mason (1/1) 9'	Report	Try: Campbell Johnstone 14'; Con: Adriaan Carelse (1/1) 15'; Cards: Conrado Roura (yellow card) 18'; Bronson Teles (yellow card) 38'	Referee: Paulo Duarte (FPR) Assistants: Derek Summers (USAR) & Joey Swatzell (USAR) TMO: Luke Rogan (USAR) Man of the Match: Robbie Coetzee (Austin Gilgronis)

February 5	Houston SaberCats	21–11	LA Giltinis	AVEVA Stadium
19:00 CST	Try: Gerrie Labuschagné 43'; Dean Muir 63'; Willie Britz 67'; Pen: Kian Meadon 15'; David Coetzer 76'	Report	Try: Hanco Germishuys 9'; Pen: Luke Burton (2) 6', 46'	Referee: Damián Schneider (UAR) Assistants: Kat Roche (USAR) & De Wet Roos (USAR) TMO: Kahlil Harrison (USAR) Man of the Match: Willie Britz (Houston SaberCats)

February 5	New Orleans Gold	13–24	New England Free Jacks	The Gold Mine
21:00 EST	Try: Nick Feakes 46'; Eric Howard 65'; Con: Damian Stevens (0/2); Pen: Carl Meyer (1/1) 24'; Cards: Robbie Coleman (yellow card) 51'	Report	Try: Beaudein Waaka 8'; Pieter Jansen 30'; John Poland 51'; Con: Beaudein Waaka (3/3) 9', 31', 52'; Pen: Beaudein Waaka (1/1) 39'; Cards: Pieter Jansen (yellow card) 61'	Referee: Moe Chaudhry (RC) Assistants: Jack Gohl (RA) & Allen Alongi (USAR) Man of the Match: Beaudein Waaka (New England Free Jacks)

February 6	(1 BP) San Diego Legion	31–29	Utah Warriors (2 BP)	SDSU Sports Deck
14:00 PST	Try: Joe Pietersen 23'; Bjorn Basson 43'; Nate Augspurger 47'; Peter Malcolm 62'; Ben Mitchell 73'; Con: Joe Pietersen (3/5) 48', 63', 74'; Pen: Joe Pietersen (0/2)	Report	Try: Mike Te'o 58'; Cliven Loubser 68'; Caleb Makene 78'; Ratu Veremalua Vugakoto 80+6'; Con: Cliven Loubser (3/4) 59', 69', 80+7'; Pen: Cliven Loubser (1/1) 10'	Referee: Scott Green (USAR) Assistants: Marquise Goodwin (USAR) & Jacob Gonzales (USAR) TMO: Austin Reed (USAR) Man of the Match: Nate Augspurger (San Diego Legion)

February 6	Seattle Seawolves	21–8	Toronto Arrows	Starfire Stadium
19:00 PST	Try: Duncan Matthews 29'; Ross Neal 64'; Con: AJ Alatimu (1/2) 30'; Pen: AJ Alatimu (3/3) 4', 11', 48'	Report	Try: Mitch Richardson 35'; Con: Will Kelly (0/1); Pen: Will Kelly (1/1) 15'	Referee: Mike Lash (NZR) Assistants: Chris Assmus (RC) & Brad Schwalger (RC) TMO: Shanda Assmus (RC) Man of the Match: Juan-Philip Smith (Seattle Seawolves)

Bye/s: Rugby New York

==== Week 2 (February 10–12) ====
February 10	Seattle Seawolves	20–17	Utah Warriors (1 BP)	Starfire Stadium
19:30 PST	Try: Riekert Hattingh 14'; Nakai Penny 35'; Con: AJ Alatimu (2/2) 15', 36'; Pen: AJ Alatimu (2/2) 67', 74'; Cards: Kellen Gordon (yellow card) 59'	Report	Try: Bailey Wilson 69'; Chad Gough 77'; Con: Cliven Loubser (2/2) 70', 78'; Pen: Cliven Loubser (1/1) 27'	Referee: Damián Schneider (UAR) Assistants: Chris Assmus (RC) & Denny Russell (USAR) TMO: Shanda Assmus (RC) Man of the Match:

February 11	Toronto Arrows	16–31	LA Giltinis (1 BP)	Starlight Stadium
19:00 PST	Try: Mike Sheppard 13'; Con: Automatic conversion 13'; Pen: Will Kelly (2/3) 2', 24'; Spencer Jones (1/1) 21'	Report	Try: Angus Cottrell (2) 17', 27'; Will Chambers 48'; Hanco Germishuys 59'; Harrison Goddard 71'; Con: Luke Burton (2/4) 60', 72'; Automatic conversion 27'; Cards: Jordan Trainor (yellow card) 53'; John Ryberg (yellow card) 75'	Referee: Chris Assmus (RC) Assistants: Damián Schneider (UAR) & Julianne Zussman (RC) TMO: Shanda Assmus (RC) Man of the Match:

February 12	(1 BP) San Diego Legion	37–29	Dallas Jackals	SDSU Sports Deck
11:00 PST	Try: Penalty try 8'; Patrick Madden 45'; Bjorn Basson 66'; Ben Mitchell 69'; Ryan Matyas 75'; Con: Automatic conversion (2) 8', 75'; Matías Freyre (1/3) 46'; Pen: Matías Freyre (2/2) 23', 35'; Ma'a Nonu (0/1)	Report	Try: Henry Trinder 33'; Conrado Roura 62'; Con: Automatic conversion 33'; Adriaan Carelse (1/1) 63'; Pen: Adriaan Carelse (5/8) 3', 16', 39', 47', 52'; Cards: Carlo de Nysschen (yellow card) 8'	Referee: Derek Summers (USAR) Assistants: Jack Gohl (RA) & Marquise Goodwin (USAR) TMO: Austin Reed (USAR) Man of the Match: Ryan Matyas (San Diego Legion)

February 12	(1 BP) Houston SaberCats	7–10	Rugby New York	Aveva Stadium
19:00 CST	Try: Christian Dyer 66'; Con: David Coetzer 67'; Cards: Maka Unufe (yellow card) 46'	Report	Try: Ed Fidow (2) 58', 78'; Con: Sam Windsor (0/2); Pen: Sam Windsor (0/1); Cards: Nate Brakeley (yellow card) 64'	Referee: Paulo Duarte (FPR) Assistants: Kat Roche (USAR) & De Wet Roos (USAR) TMO: Luke Rogan (USAR) Man of the Match:

February 12	(1 BP) New Orleans Gold	9–14	Rugby ATL	Gold Mine
19:00 CST	Pen: Carl Meyer (3/3) 26', 56', 75'	Report	Try: Daemon Torres 33'; Martini Talapusi 68'; Con: Joaquín de la Vega Mendía (1/1) 34'; Automatic conversion 68'	Referee: Mike Lash (NZR) Assistants: Allen Alongi (USAR) & Saade Bou-Mikael (USAR) TMO: Kahlil Harrison (USAR) Man of the Match:

February 12	(1 BP) Austin Gilgronis	57–12	Old Glory DC	Bold Stadium
19:30 CST	Try: Mark O'Keeffe 1'; Julián Domínguez (2) 10', 25'; Conner Mooneyham (2) 12', 22'; Jake Turnbull 45'; Marcel Brache 63'; Hugh Roach 69'; Con: Mack Mason (4/5) 2', 11', 13', 23'; Automatic conversion (2) 45', 63'; Will Magie (1/1) 70'; Pen: Mack Mason (1/1) 9'	Report	Try: Renata Roberts-Tenana (2) 42', 79'; Con: William Talataina (0/1); Automatic conversion 79'	Referee: J. P. Doyle (RFU) Assistants: Scott Green (USAR) & Andrew Low (USAR) TMO: Nick Hannon (USAR) Man of the Match: Marcel Brache (Austin Gilgronis)

Bye/s: New England Free Jacks

==== Week 3 (February 18–20) ====
February 18	Old Glory DC	25–41	New England Free Jacks (1 BP)	Segra Field
20:00 EST	Try: Peni Lasaqa 35'; Rob Irimescu 47'; Cory Daniel 80'; Con: Rohan Saifoloi (2/3) 36', 48'; Pen: Rohan Saifoloi (2/2) 13', 21'; Cards: Apisai Naikatini (yellow card) 18'	Report	Try: Pieter Jansen 8'; Mitch Wilson (2) 14', 69'; Slade McDowall 19'; Harry Barlow 27'; Beaudein Waaka (2) 53', 60'; Con: Beaudein Waaka (3/7) 15', 54', 61'; Pen: Beaudein Waaka (0/1); Cards: Slade McDowall (red card) 76'	Referee: Paulo Duarte (FPR) Assistants: Gavin McCandless (USAR) & Aaron Davis (USAR) TMO: Luke Rogan (USAR) Man of the Match:

February 19	(2 BP) Rugby ATL	31–36	Rugby New York (1 BP)	Silverbacks Park
15:00 EST	Try: Johan Momsen 23'; Alex Maughan (2) 35', 46'; Will Leonard 38'; Con: Joaquín de la Vega Mendía (4/4) 24', 36', 39', 47'; Pen: Joaquín de la Vega Mendía (0/1); Kurt Coleman (1/1) 68'	Report	Try: Ed Fidow 18'; Andrew Coe 20'; Dylan Fawsitt 31'; Jason Emery 59'; Troy Lockyear 64'; Con: Automatic conversion (3) 18', 20', 59'; Sam Windsor (1/1) 32'; Jack Heighton (0/1); Pen: Sam Windsor (1/1) 4'	Referee: Damián Schneider (UAR) Assistants: Cisco Lopez (USAR) & Dave Edwards (USAR) TMO: Chris Assmus (RC) Man of the Match: Nate Brakeley (Rugby New York)

February 19	(1 BP) New Orleans Gold	23–24	Toronto Arrows	Gold Mine
15:00 CST	Try: Eric Howard 14'; Carl Meyer 46'; Nick Feakes 55'; Con: Carl Meyer (0/2); Automatic conversion 46'; Pen: Carl Meyer (2/3) 7', 62'; Cards: Malcolm May (yellow card) 23'; Dino Waldren (yellow card) 50'	Report	Try: Kyle Baillie 4'; Brock Webster 64'; Con: Sam Malcolm (1/2) 5'; Pen: Sam Malcolm (4/4) 26', 59', 70', 76'	Referee: Federico Anselmi (UAR) Assistants: Allen Alongi (USAR) & De Wet Roos (USAR) TMO: Nick Hannon (USAR) Man of the Match: Brock Webster (Toronto Arrows)

February 19	(1 BP) Austin Gilgronis	24–10	Utah Warriors	Bold Stadium
19:00 CST	Try: Bryce Campbell 31'; Mark O'Keeffe (2) 49', 59'; Dominic Akina 55'; Con: Mack Mason (2/4) 32', 60'	Report	Try: Tomasi Tonga 69'; Con: Caleb Makene (1/1) 70'; Pen: Caleb Makene (1/1) 47'	Referee: Mike Lash (NZR) Assistants: Joey Swatzell (USAR) & Andrew Low (USAR) TMO: Jack Gohl (RA) Man of the Match: Isaac Ross (Austin Gilgronis)

February 19	(2 BP) Dallas Jackals	33–38	Houston SaberCats (1 BP)	Choctaw Stadium
19:00 CST	Try: Matt Frings 20'; Moe Abdelmonem 37'; Mike Matarazzo 45'; Conrado Roura (2) 48', 65'; Con: Adriaan Carelse (4/5) 21', 46', 49', 66'; Pen: Adriaan Carelse (0/1); Cards: Alex Tucci (yellow card) 28'; Moe Abdelmonem (yellow card) 39'	Report	Try: Maka Unufe 10'; Marcos Moroni 29'; Danny Barrett 61'; Jax Hidalgo (2) 73', 78'; Christian Dyer 80'; Con: David Coetzer (3/5) 11', 30', 62'; Automatic conversion 78'; Cards: Gerrie Labuschagné (red card) 48'	Attendance: 3,152; Referee: Scott Green (USAR) Assistants: Derek Summers (USAR) & Cole Jones (USAR) TMO: Kahlil Harrison (USAR) Man of the Match: Danny Barrett (Houston SaberCats)

February 20	(2 BP) San Diego Legion	28–31	Seattle Seawolves (1 BP)	SDSU Sports Deck
14:00 PST	Try: Joe Pietersen 9'; Nate Augspurger (2) 37', 70'; Matt Moulds 59'; Con: Joe Pietersen (2/2) 10', 38'; Automatic conversion (2) 59', 70'	Report	Try: Tavite Lopeti (2) 27', 57'; Riekert Hattingh (2) 40', 61'; Con: AJ Alatimu (2/2) 28', 40'; Automatic conversion 57'; Kieran Joyce (1/1) 62'; Pen: AJ Alatimu (1/1) 48'	Referee: J. P. Doyle (RFU) Assistants: Marquise Goodwin (USAR) & Jacob Gonzalez (USAR) TMO: Austin Reed (USAR) Man of the Match: Tavite Lopeti (Seattle Seawolves)

Bye/s: LA Giltinis

==== Week 4 (February 26–27) ====
February 26	Old Glory DC	5–29	Toronto Arrows (1 BP)	Segra Field
16:00 EST	Try: Rob Irimescu 16'; Con: Rohan Saifoloi (0/1); Cards: Jamason Faʻanana-Schultz (yellow card) 42'	Report	Try: Lucas Rumball 18'; Ross Braude 25'; Mike Sheppard 40+5'; Cole Keith 48'; Con: Sam Malcolm (3/4) 26', 40+5', 49'; Pen: Sam Malcolm (1/1) 80'	Referee: Damián Schneider (UAR) Assistants: Gavin McCandless (USAR) & Aaron Davis (USAR) TMO: Amelia Luciano (USAR) Man of the Match: Ross Braude (Toronto Arrows)

February 26	Dallas Jackals	5–41	Rugby New York (1 BP)	Choctaw Stadium
19:00 CST	Try: Chad London 32'; Con: Adriaan Carelse (0/1)	Report	Try: Kalolo Tuiloma (2) 7', 39'; Pago Haini 18'; Will Tucker 28'; Sam Windsor 55'; Jack Heighton 65'; Wilton Rebolo 80'; Con: Sam Windsor (1/4) 19'; Automatic conversion 55'; Jack Heighton (1/1) 66'; Andy Ellis (0/1); Drop: Sam Windsor (0/1)	Referee: Mike Lash (NZR) Assistants: Kat Roche (USAR) & Cole Jones (USAR) TMO: Jack Gohl (RA) Man of the Match: Pago Haini (Rugby New York)

February 26	(1 BP) Seattle Seawolves	18–25	Austin Gilgronis	Starfire Stadium
17:00 PST	Try: Duncan Matthews 33'; Rhyno Herbst 80'; Con: AJ Alatimu (1/2) 80'; Pen: AJ Alatimu (2/2) 21', 54'	Report	Try: Julián Domínguez 42'; Lachlan McCaffrey 66'; Jake Turnbull 70'; Con: Mack Mason (2/3) 42', 71'; Pen: Mack Mason (2/2) 17', 27'	Referee: Derek Summers (USAR) Assistants: Chris Assmus (RC) & Denny Russell (USAR) TMO: Kahlil Harrison (USAR) Man of the Match: Ryan Louwrens (Austin Gilgronis)

February 26	Houston SaberCats	20–31	San Diego Legion	Aveva Stadium
20:00 CST	Try: Christian Dyer 11'; Jax Hidalgo 17'; Con: David Coetzer (2/2) 12', 18'; Pen: David Coetzer (2/2) 27', 33'	Report	Try: Ben Grant 1'; Thomas Morani 22'; Matías Freyre 72'; Con: Joe Pietersen (2/3) 2', 73'; Pen: Joe Pietersen (4/5) 20', 29', 57', 69'; Cards: Ma'a Nonu (yellow card) 26'	Referee: Federico Anselmi (UAR) Assistants: Mitch Damm (USAR) & De Wet Roos (USAR) TMO: Luke Rogan (USAR) Man of the Match: Thomas Morani (San Diego Legion)

February 27	LA Giltinis	19–15	New England Free Jacks (1 BP)	Los Angeles Memorial Coliseum
15:00 PST	Try: Hanco Germishuys 15'; Ben LeSage 20'; Nathan Den Hoedt 67'; Con: Luke Burton (2/3) 16', 68'	Report	Try: Paula Balekana 40'; Pieter Jansen 44'; Con: Beaudein Waaka (1/2) 45'; Pen: Beaudein Waaka (1/1) 2'	Referee: J. P. Doyle (RFU) Assistants: Jack Gohl (RA) & Tim Lew (USAR) TMO: Austin Reed (USAR) Man of the Match: Bill Meakes (LA Giltinis)

Bye/s: New Orleans Gold, Rugby ATL, Utah Warriors

==== Week 5 (March 4–6) ====
March 4	(1 BP) Seattle Seawolves	24–25	New Orleans Gold	Starfire Stadium
19:30 PST	Try: Riekert Hattingh 58'; Ross Neal 71'; Con: AJ Alatimu (1/2) 59'; Pen: AJ Alatimu (4/5) 21', 28', 45', 64'	Report	Try: Moni Tonga'uiha 66'; Con: Carl Meyer (1/1) 67'; Pen: Carl Meyer (6/6) 3', 8', 12', 30', 40', 78'	Referee: Paulo Duarte (FPR) Assistants: Chris Assmus (RC) & Brad Schwalger (RC) TMO: Shanda Assmus (RC) Man of the Match: Carl Meyer (New Orleans Gold)

March 5	(1 BP) Utah Warriors	69–22	Dallas Jackals	Zions Bank Stadium
12:00 MST	Try: Saia Uhila 14'; Tomasi Tonga 25'; Mika Kruse (3) 33', 40', 74'; Mike Te'o (2) 45', 52'; Niall Saunders 59'; Ratu Veremalua Vugakoto 61'; Coleson Warner 77'; Con: Cliven Loubser (6/8) 15', 34', 40', 53', 60', 62'; Caleb Makene (2/2) 75', 78'; Pen: Cliven Loubser (1/1) 20'	Report	Try: Eric Naposki 56'; Ned Hodson (2) 69', 71'; Con: Adriaan Carelse (1/2) 57'; Automatic conversion 71'; Pen: Adriaan Carelse (1/1) 29'	Attendance: 3,608; Referee: J. P. Doyle (RFU) Assistants: Kahlil Harrison (USAR) & Kage Green (USAR) TMO: Mike Lash (NZR) Man of the Match: Niall Saunders (Utah Warriors)

March 5	(1 BP) Rugby ATL	29–22	Houston SaberCats (1 BP)	Silverbacks Park
15:00 EST	Try: Matt Heaton 11'; Marko Janse van Rensburg (3) 13', 26', 36'; Con: Joaquín de la Vega Mendía (3/4) 11', 13', 27'; Pen: Joaquín de la Vega Mendía (1/1) 53'	Report	Try: Dillon Smit 1'; David Coetzer 40'; Nick Boyer 77'; Con: David Coetzer (2/3) 1', 40'; Pen: David Coetzer 2'; Cards: Keni Nasoqeqe (yellow card) 41'	Referee: Damián Schneider (UAR) Assistants: Henrique Platais (CBRu) & Cisco Lopez (USAR) TMO: Amelia Luciano (USAR) Man of the Match: Ryan Rees (Rugby ATL)

March 5	Austin Gilgronis	22–9	LA Giltinis	Bold Stadium
19:00 CST	Try: Ryan Louwrens 45'; Conner Mooneyham (2) 54', 64'; Con: Will Magie (1/2) 46'; Pen: Will Magie (1/1) 43'	Report	Pen: Orene Ai'i (3/3) 3', 12', 29'	Referee: Moe Chaudhry (RC) Assistants: Derek Summers (USAR) & Joey Swatzell (USAR) TMO: Jack Gohl (RA) Man of the Match: Ryan Louwrens (Austin Gilgronis)

March 6	(1 BP) Rugby New York	29–38	New England Free Jacks (1 BP)	JFK Stadium
15:00 EST	Try: Andrew Coe (2) 8', 35'; Brendon O'Connor 44'; Jack Heighton 80'; Con: Sam Windsor (2/3) 9', 45'; Jack Heighton (1/1) 80'; Pen: Sam Windsor (1/1) 16'	Report	Try: Slade McDowall 11'; Beaudein Waaka (3) 22', 42', 77'; Joe Johnston 70'; Con: Beaudein Waaka (4/4) 12', 23', 71', 78'; Automatic conversion 42'; Pen: Beaudein Waaka (1/1) 56'	Attendance: 1,400; Referee: Scott Green (USAR) Assistants: Lex Weiner (USAR) & Will Nelson (USAR) TMO: Miles McIvor (USAR) Man of the Match: Beaudein Waaka (New England Free Jacks)

March 6	San Diego Legion	24–12	Old Glory DC	SDSU Sports Deck
16:00 PST	Try: Matt Moulds 4'; Thomas Morani 16'; David Tameilau 68'; Con: Joe Pietersen (2/2) 5', 69'; Automatic conversion 16'; Pen: Joe Pietersen (1/1) 9'; Cards: Chris Robshaw (yellow card) 35'	Report	Try: William Talataina 50'; Renata Roberts-Tenana 54'; Con: Automatic conversion 50'; Rohan Saifoloi (0/1)	Referee: Kat Roche (USAR) Assistants: Marquise Goodwin (USAR) & Jacob Gonzalez (USAR) TMO: Austin Reed (USAR) Man of the Match:

Bye/s: Toronto Arrows

==== Week 6 (March 12–13) ====
March 12	Rugby ATL	29–14	Austin Gilgronis	Silverbacks Park
15:00 EST	Try: Matt Heaton 18'; Marko Janse van Rensburg 26'; Martini Talapusi 64'; Con: Martini Talapusi (1/3) 65'; Pen: Martini Talapusi (4/4) 3', 34', 49', 60'	Report	Try: Mark O'Keeffe 36'; Ryan Louwrens 56'; Con: Mack Mason (2/2) 37', 57'	Referee: Federico Anselmi (UAR) Assistants: Henrique Platais (CBRu) & Dave Edwards (USAR) TMO: Chris Assmus (RC) Man of the Match: Martini Talapusi (Rugby ATL)

March 12	New England Free Jacks	21–15	Toronto Arrows (1 BP)	Veterans Memorial Stadium
16:30 EST	Try: Joe Johnston 3'; Slade McDowall (2) 49', 67'; Con: Beaudein Waaka (3/3) 4', 50', 68'; Cards: Josh Larsen (yellow card) 72'	Report	Try: Brock Webster 54'; Jack McRogers 80+3'; Con: Sam Malcolm (1/2) 80+4'; Pen: Sam Malcolm (1/1) 37'; Cards: Cole Keith (yellow card) 61'	Referee: Paulo Duarte (FPR) Assistants: Jarrod Ford (USAR) & Nick Tricarico (USAR) TMO: Amelia Luciano (USAR) Man of the Match: Slade McDowall (New England Free Jacks)

March 12	Houston SaberCats	21–19	Seattle Seawolves (1 BP)	Aveva Stadium
19:00 CST	Try: Siaosi Mahoni 12'; Dillon Smit 61'; Gideon van Wyk 72'; Con: David Coetzer (1/1) 13'; Automatic conversion 61'; Robbie Povey (1/1) 73'	Report	Try: Ross Neal 40'; Martin Iosefo 55'; Juan-Philip Smith 79'; Con: AJ Alatimu (1/2) 56'; Juan-Philip Smith (1/1) 79'; Pen: AJ Alatimu (0/1)	Referee: Scott Green (USAR) Assistants: Cole Jones (USAR) & Brian Dusablon (USAR) TMO: Derek Summers (USAR) Man of the Match: Dillon Smit (Houston SaberCats)

March 12	(2 BP) Dallas Jackals	26–32	New Orleans Gold (1 BP)	Choctaw Stadium
19:00 CST	Try: Eric Naposki 38'; Alex Tucci 55'; Alejandro Torres (2) 62', 70'; Con: Adriaan Carelse (2/3) 56', 63'; Automatic conversion 70'	Report	Try: Ignacio Dotti 5'; Eric Howard 22'; JP du Plessis 32'; Carl Meyer 45'; Damian Stevens 60'; Con: Carl Meyer (2/5) 6', 46'; Pen: Carl Meyer (1/1) 80'	Referee: Marquise Goodwin (USAR) Assistants: De Wet Roos (USAR) & Shawn Martin (USAR) TMO: Luke Rogan (USAR) Man of the Match: Moni Tonga'uiha (New Orleans Gold)

March 13	Rugby New York	26–23	San Diego Legion (1 BP)	JFK Stadium
15:00 EDT	Try: Faʻasui Fuatai 33'; Kara Pryor 46'; Con: Jack Heighton (2/2) 34', 47'; Pen: Jack Heighton (4/4) 12', 27', 69', 80'	Report	Try: Matías Freyre (2) 42', 58'; Con: Joe Pietersen (2/2) 43', 59'; Pen: Joe Pietersen (3/4) 14', 29', 54'; Drop: Matías Freyre (0/1)	Referee: Mike Lash (NZR) Assistants: Lex Weiner (USAR) & Miles McIvor (USAR) TMO: Nick Hannon (USAR) Man of the Match: Jack Heighton (Rugby New York)

March 13	LA Giltinis	19–28	Utah Warriors	Los Angeles Memorial Coliseum
16:00 PDT	Try: Bill Meakes 20'; Dave Dennis 43'; Tas Smith 67'; Con: Orene Ai'i (2/3) 21', 68'	Report	Try: Lance Williams (2) 40', 74'; Niall Saunders 71'; Con: Cliven Loubser (2/3) 40', 75'; Pen: Cliven Loubser (3/3) 25', 54', 63'	Referee: Luke Rogan (USAR) Assistants: Austin Reed (USAR) & Tim Lew (USAR) TMO: Chris Assmus (RC) Man of the Match: Niall Saunders (Utah Warriors)

Bye/s: Old Glory DC

==== Week 7 (March 19–20) ====
March 19	(1 BP) Utah Warriors	24–27	Toronto Arrows (1 BP)	Zions Bank Stadium
14:30 MDT	Try: Mike Te'o 24'; Cliven Loubser 72'; Connor Burns 74'; Con: Automatic conversion 24'; Cliven Loubser (2/2) 73', 75'; Pen: Cliven Loubser (1/1) 23'; Cards: Jurie van Vuuren (yellow card) 9'	Report	Try: Ronan Foley 12'; Brock Webster 43'; Dennon Robinson-Bartlett 50'; Jack McRogers 64'; Con: Sam Malcolm (1/3) 13'; Will Kelly (1/1) 65'; Pen: Sam Malcolm (1/1) 68'	Referee: Mike Lash (NZR) Assistants: Paulo Duarte (FPR) & Kahlil Harrison (USAR) TMO: Chris Assmus (RC) Man of the Match: Ronan Foley (Toronto Arrows)

March 19	(1 BP) LA Giltinis	26–13	San Diego Legion	Los Angeles Memorial Coliseum
16:00 PDT	Try: Will Chambers 15'; Orene Ai'i 38'; Hanco Germishuys 48'; Marco Fepulea'i 72'; Con: Luke Burton (3/4) 39', 49', 73'	Report	Try: Kainoa Lloyd 60'; Con: Joe Pietersen (1/1) 61'; Pen: Joe Pietersen (2/2) 19', 66'; Cards: Tiaan Loots (yellow card) 62'	Referee: Scott Green (USAR) Assistants: Austin Reed (USAR) & Tim Lew (USAR) TMO: Jack Gohl (RA) Man of the Match: Bill Meakes (LA Giltinis) 1st annual "Cali Cup" match winners: LA Giltinis (1–0)

March 19	Austin Gilgronis	17–25	New England Free Jacks	Bold Stadium
19:00 CDT	Try: Mark O'Keeffe 20'; Lachlan McCaffrey 48'; Con: Automatic conversion 20'; Mack Mason (1/1) 49'; Pen: Mack Mason (1/1) 54'; Cards: Hugh Roach (yellow card) 22'; Christian Ostberg (yellow card) 28'	Report	Try: Dougie Fife 8'; Paula Balekana 33'; Zach Bastres 73'; Con: John Poland (0/1); Automatic conversion 33'; Beaudein Waaka (1/1) 74'; Pen: John Poland (2/2) 13', 23'	Referee: Luke Rogan (USAR) Assistants: Joey Swatzell (USAR) & Andrew Low (USAR) TMO: Davey Ardrey (USAR) Man of the Match: Le Roux Malan (New England Free Jacks)

March 19	Dallas Jackals	12–34	Seattle Seawolves (1 BP)	Choctaw Stadium
19:00 CDT	Try: Eric Naposki 19'; Adriaan Booysen 70'; Con: Adriaan Carelse (1/2) 71'; Cards: Matt Frings (red card) 28'; Chad London (yellow card) 51'	Report	Try: Juan-Philip Smith 2'; Mathew Turner 33'; Riekert Hattingh 52'; Tavite Lopeti 77'; Con: Kieran Joyce (3/3) 3', 34', 53'; Automatic conversion 77'; Pen: Kieran Joyce (2/3) 8', 24'; Cards: Samu Manoa (yellow card) 26'; James Malcolm (yellow card) 69'	Referee: Federico Anselmi (UAR) Assistants: Cole Jones (USAR) & Brian Dusablon (USAR) TMO: Amelia Luciano (USAR) Man of the Match: Riekert Hattingh (Seattle Seawolves)

March 19	New Orleans Gold	19–30	Rugby New York (1 BP)	Gold Mine
20:00 EDT	Try: Penalty try 18'; Nick Feakes 66'; Devin Short 72'; Con: Carl Meyer (1/2) 73'	Report	Try: Andrew Coe 2'; Kalolo Tuiloma 15'; Jason Emery 34'; Will Tucker 56'; Con: Jason Emery (2/3) 16', 35'; Sam Windsor (0/1); Pen: Jason Emery (2/2) 40', 42'; Cards: Nate Brakeley (yellow card) 18'	Referee: Marcus Playle (NZR) Assistants: Rob Halcomb (USAR) & Saade Bou-Mikael (USAR) TMO: Nick Hannon (USAR) Man of the Match: Ed Fidow (Rugby New York)

March 20	Old Glory DC	13–27	Rugby ATL (1 BP)	Segra Field
19:00 EDT	Try: Dom Bailey 64'; Mike Dabulas 79'; Con: William Talataina (0/2); Pen: Rohan Saifoloi (1/1) 16'	Report	Try: Justin Basson 9'; Harley Davidson 12'; Marko Janse van Rensburg 45'; Alex Maughan 57'; Con: Kurt Coleman (2/4) 46', 58'; Pen: Kurt Coleman (1/1) 52'	Referee: Derek Summers (USAR) Assistants: Gavin McCandless (USAR) & Aaron Davis (USAR) TMO: Amelia Luciano (USAR) Man of the Match: Justin Basson (Rugby ATL)

Bye/s: Houston SaberCats

==== Week 8 (March 26–27) ====
March 26	(1 BP) Old Glory DC	22–31	New Orleans Gold (1 BP)	Segra Field
15:00 EDT	Try: Apisai Naikatini 5'; Peni Lasaqa (2) 27', 80+2'; Junior Sa'u 64'; Con: Mike Dabulas (0/1); William Talataina (1/2) 28'; Danny Tusitala (0/1)	Report	Try: Dino Waldren 11'; Moni Tonga'uiha 35'; Pat O'Toole (2) 43', 56'; Harley Wheeler 75'; Con: Carl Meyer (1/1) 12'; Automatic conversion 35'; Damian Stevens (1/3) 76'	Referee: Luke Rogan (USAR) Assistants: Aaron Davis (USAR) & Craig Sakowski (USAR) TMO: Nick Hannon (USAR) Man of the Match: Pat O'Toole (New Orleans Gold)

March 26	(1 BP) Rugby ATL	27–41	New England Free Jacks (1 BP)	Silverbacks Park
15:00 EDT	Try: Lui Sitama 4'; Te Rangatira Waitokia 26'; Will Leonard 40+1'; Connor Cook 48'; Con: Kurt Coleman (2/4) 5', 40+2'; Pen: Kurt Coleman (1/1) 55'; Cards: Lui Sitama (yellow card) 50'	Report	Try: Le Roux Malan 15'; Mitch Wilson 32'; Harry Barlow 50'; Wayne van der Bank 70'; Mills Sanerivi 74'; Con: Beaudein Waaka (2/2) 16', 33'; John Poland (1/1) 51'; Mitch Wilson (2/2) 71', 75'; Pen: Mitch Wilson (2/2) 65', 80'; Cards: Jesse Parete (yellow card) 63'	Attendance: 2,500; Referee: Jack Gohl (RA) Assistants: Cisco Lopez (USAR) & Dave Edwards (USAR) TMO: Amelia Luciano (USAR) Man of the Match: Slade McDowall (New England Free Jacks)

March 26	Seattle Seawolves	12–31	LA Giltinis (1 BP)	Starfire Stadium
15:00 PDT	Try: James Malcolm 63'; Lauina Futi 75'; Con: Kieran Joyce (1/2) 64'; Pen: AJ Alatimu (0/1); Cards: Setefano Funaki (yellow card) 74'	Report	Try: Hanco Germishuys 12'; Joe Taufeteʻe (2) 24', 45'; Jordan Trainor 68'; Penalty try 74'; Con: Luke Burton (2/4) 13', 69'; Automatic conversion 74'	Referee: Mike Lash (NZR) Assistants: Brad Schwalger (RC) & Denny Russell (USAR) TMO: Austin Reed (USAR) Man of the Match: Joe Taufeteʻe (LA Giltinis)

March 26	Utah Warriors	12–28	Houston SaberCats (1 BP)	Zions Bank Stadium
17:00 MDT	Try: Ratu Veremalua Vugakoto 63'; Paul Lasike 72'; Con: Caleb Makene (0/1); Calvin Whiting (1/1) 73'; Pen: Cliven Loubser (0/1); Drop: Mike Te'o (0/1)	Report	Try: Gerrie Labuschagné 16'; Dean Muir 25'; Willie Britz 59'; Gideon van Wyk 79'; Con: David Coetzer (4/4) 17', 26', 60', 80'; Pen: Gerrie Labuschagné (0/1); Cards: Nicolás Solveyra (yellow card) 34'; Maka Unufe (yellow card) 63'	Referee: Marcus Playle (NZR) Assistants: Brett Johnson (USAR) & Kage Green (USAR) TMO: Kahlil Harrison (USAR) Man of the Match: Gerrie Labuschagné (Houston Sabercats)

March 27	(1 BP) Rugby New York	10–14	Toronto Arrows	JFK Stadium
15:00 EDT	Try: Kaleb Geiger 20'; Ed Fidow 68'; Con: Andy Ellis (0/1); Sam Windsor (0/1)	Report	Try: Johnny Sheridan 45'; Andrew Quattrin 78'; Con: Automatic conversion (2) 45', 78'; Cards: Ueta Tufuga (yellow card) 37'; Paul Ciulini (yellow card) 65'	Referee: Federico Anselmi (UAR) Assistants: Lex Weiner (USAR) & Will Nelson (USAR) TMO: Miles McIvor (USAR) Man of the Match: Andrew Quattrin (Toronto Arrows)

Bye/s: Austin Gilgronis, Dallas Jackals, San Diego Legion

==== Week 9 (April 1–3) ====
April 1	Utah Warriors	25–40	San Diego Legion (1 BP)	Zions Bank Stadium
20:00 MDT	Try: Tyler Fisher (2) 36', 74'; Calvin Whiting 59'; Con: Caleb Makene (1/2) 75'; Automatic conversion 59'; Pen: Caleb Makene (2/2) 3', 18'	Report	Try: David Tameilau 20'; Bjorn Basson (2) 27', 31'; Jason Higgins 41'; Con: Joe Pietersen (4/4) 21', 28', 32', 42'; Pen: Joe Pietersen (4/5) 7', 56', 65', 77'; Drop: Joe Pietersen (0/1)	Attendance: 3,092; Referee: Federico Anselmi (UAR) Assistants: Kahlil Harrison (USAR) & Kage Green (USAR) TMO: Mike Lash (NZR) Man of the Match: Bjorn Basson (San Diego Legion)

April 2	(1 BP) Toronto Arrows	14–20	Rugby ATL	York Lions Stadium
12:00 EDT	Try: Andrew Quattrin 48'; Con: Sam Malcolm (0/1); Pen: Sam Malcolm (3/3) 10', 44', ??'; Cards: James O'Neill (yellow card) ??'	Report	Try: Jason Damm ??'; Marko Janse van Rensburg ??'; Con: Kurt Coleman (2/2) ??', ??'; Pen: Kurt Coleman (2/2) 19', 25'	Attendance: 2,000; Referee: Marcus Playle (NZR) Assistants: Michael Jones (RC) & Peter Pender (RC) TMO: Andrew Hosie (RC) Man of the Match: Sam Malcolm (Toronto Arrows)

April 2	(1 BP) New England Free Jacks	33–29	New Orleans Gold (2 BP)	Veterans Memorial Stadium
16:30 EDT	Try: Le Roux Malan 2'; Zach Bastres 7'; Wayne van der Bank 19'; Cam Davidowicz 39'; Foster DeWitt 64'; Con: Beaudein Waaka (4/5) 3', 20', 40', 65'; Cards: Jack Reeves (yellow card) 77'	Report	Try: Ross Depperschmidt 32'; Damian Stevens 41'; Dino Waldren 48'; JP du Plessis 53'; Con: Damian Stevens (2/3) 49', 54'; Automatic conversion 41'; Pen: Damian Stevens (1/1) 63'	Referee: Scott Green (USAR) Assistants: Amelia Luciano (USAR) & Jarrod Ford (USAR) TMO: Davey Ardrey (USAR) Man of the Match: Wayne van der Bank (New England Free Jacks)

April 3	(1 BP) Rugby New York	35–31	Old Glory DC (2 BP)	JFK Stadium
15:00 EDT	Try: Will Tucker 6'; Sam Windsor 15'; Dylan Fawsitt 39'; Conor McManus 58'; Kaleb Geiger 68'; Con: Sam Windsor (2/2) 7', 40'; Automatic conversion (2) 15', 58'; Jason Emery (1/1) 69'	Report	Try: William Talataina 31'; Mike Dabulas 35'; Dom Bailey 53'; Junior Sa'u (2) 64', 70'; Con: Mike Dabulas (2/4) 32', 54'; Automatic conversion 35'	Referee: Moe Chaudhry (RC) Assistants: Lex Weiner (USAR) & Miles McIvor (USAR) TMO: Nick Hannon (USAR) Man of the Match: Will Tucker (Rugby New York)

April 3	(1 BP) LA Giltinis	47–7	Dallas Jackals	Los Angeles Memorial Coliseum
14:00 PDT	Try: Zach Bonte 2'; Ben LeSage 10'; Charlie Abel 25'; Ryan James 37'; Andrew Tuala (2) 55', 60'; Adam Channel 71'; Con: Luke Burton (6/7) 3', 11', 26', 38', 61', 72'	Report	Try: Cael Hodgson 15'; Con: Adriaan Carelse (1/1) 16'; Pen: Adriaan Carelse (0/1)	Referee: Paulo Duarte (FPR) Assistants: Marquise Goodwin (USAR) & Austin Reed (USAR) TMO: Jack Gohl (RA) Man of the Match: Luke White (LA Giltinis)

April 3	(1 BP) Austin Gilgronis	43–5	Houston SaberCats	Bold Stadium
18:00 CDT	Try: Mack Mason 7'; Julián Domínguez (2) 40+1', 65'; Mason Pedersen 43'; Penalty try 54'; Mason Koch 76'; Con: Automatic conversion (2) 7', 54'; Mack Mason (3/3) 40+2', 44', 66'; Will Magie (0/1); Pen: Mack Mason (1/1) 39'; Cards: Ryan Louwrens (yellow card) 29'; Casey McDermott Vai (yellow card) 79'	Report	Try: Gideon van Wyk 24'; Con: David Coetzer (0/1); Cards: Keni Nasoqeqe (yellow card) 54'	Referee: Mike Lash (NZR) Assistants: Joey Swatzell (USAR) & Andrew Low (USAR) TMO: Derek Summers (USAR) Man of the Match: Mack Mason (Austin Gilgronis) 3rd annual "Texas Cup" match winners (third match): Austin Gilgronis (3–0)

Bye/s: Seattle Seawolves

==== Week 10 (April 9–10) ====
April 9	(1 BP) Toronto Arrows	32–27	Old Glory DC (2 BP)	York Lions Stadium
12:00 EDT	Try: Conor McCann 7'; Jack McRogers 31'; Cole Keith 34'; Mitch Voralek 43'; Con: Sam Malcolm (2/3) 8', 35'; Automatic conversion 43'; Pen: Sam Malcolm (2/2) 3', 60'; Cards: Johnny Sheridan (yellow card) 73'; Mike Sheppard (yellow card) 79'	Report	Try: Stan South 16'; Dom Bailey 21'; Cory Daniel (2) 46', 73'; Peni Lasaqa 68'; Con: Mike Dabulas (0/2); Rohan Saifoloi (1/3) 69'	Referee: Cisco Lopez (USAR) Assistants: Peter Pender (RC) & Chris Micheletti (RC) TMO: Andrew Hosie (RC) Man of the Match: Ronan Foley (Toronto Arrows)

April 9	New England Free Jacks	24–22	Seattle Seawolves (1 BP)	Veterans Memorial Stadium
16:30 EDT	Try: Paula Balekana (2) 16', 60'; Slade McDowall 20'; Con: Beaudein Waaka (3/3) 17', 21', 61'; Pen: Beaudein Waaka (1/1) 75'	Report	Try: James Malcolm 24'; Tavite Lopeti 72'; Mathew Turner 80'; Con: Kieran Joyce (0/1); AJ Alatimu (1/1) 73'; Automatic conversion 80'; Pen: Kieran Joyce (1/1) 40'; Cards: Riekert Hattingh (yellow card) 78'	Referee: Federico Anselmi (UAR) Assistants: Amelia Luciano (USAR) & Jarrod Ford (USAR) TMO: Davey Ardrey (USAR) Man of the Match: Slade McDowall (New England Free Jacks)

April 9	New Orleans Gold	17–34	Rugby ATL (1 BP)	Gold Mine
19:00 CDT	Try: Damian Stevens 3'; Billy Stewart 38'; Harley Wheeler 54'; Con: Damian Stevens (1/3) 4'	Report	Try: Will Leonard 16'; Austin White 20'; Johan Momsen 29'; Joaquín de la Vega Mendía 59'; Kurt Coleman 73'; Con: Joaquín de la Vega Mendía (1/3) 74'; Automatic conversion (2) 29', 59'; Pen: Joaquín de la Vega Mendía (1/1) 23'	Referee: George Selwood (RFU) Assistants: De Wet Roos (USAR) & Saade Bou-Mikael (USAR) TMO: Austin Reed (USAR) Man of the Match: John-Roy Jenkinson (Rugby ATL)

April 9	(1 BP) Houston SaberCats	31–6	Dallas Jackals	Aveva Stadium
19:00 CDT	Try: Dean Muir 6'; Danny Barrett 37'; Penalty try 46'; Louritz van der Schyff (2) 53', 73'; Con: David Coetzer (2/4) 54', 74'; Automatic conversion 46'	Report	Pen: Alejandro Torres (2/3) 14', 20'; Cards: Asa Carter (yellow card) 46'	Referee: Derek Summers (USAR) Assistants: Mitch Damm (USAR) & Brian Dusablon (USAR) TMO: Kahlil Harrison (USAR) Man of the Match: Louritz van der Schyff (Houston SaberCats)

April 10	San Diego Legion	21–35	Austin Gilgronis (1 BP)	SDSU Sports Deck
14:00 PDT	Try: Matías Freyre 5'; Rohan O'Regan 36'; Con: Joe Pietersen (1/2) 37'; Pen: Joe Pietersen (3/3) 20', 26', 59'	Report	Try: Mason Pedersen 33'; Hugh Roach (2) 53', 61'; Chris Mattina 78'; Con: Mack Mason (3/4) 34', 62', 79'; Pen: Mack Mason (3/3) 15', 48', 68'	Referee: Jack Gohl (RA) Assistants: Mike Goodwin (USAR) & Alexis Alfaro (USAR) TMO: Mike Lash (NZR) Man of the Match: Marcel Brache (Austin Gilgronis)

April 10	(1 BP) LA Giltinis	43–0	Rugby New York	Los Angeles Memorial Coliseum
16:00 PDT	Try: Christian Poidevin 12'; Hanco Germishuys 26'; Harrison Goddard 34'; Djustice Sears-Duru 35'; John Ryberg (2) 64', 71'; Con: Orene Ai'i (2/3) 27', 36'; Automatic conversion 34'; Luke Burton (2/2) 65', 72'; Pen: Orene Ai'i (1/1) 44'; Cards: Djustice Sears-Duru (yellow card) 40+3'; Leslie Leuluaʻialiʻi-Makin (yellow card) 61'	Report		Referee: Marcus Playle (NZR) Assistants: Austin Reed (USAR) & Tim Lew (USAR) TMO: Chris Assmus (RC) Man of the Match: Hanco Germishuys (LA Giltinis) 2nd annual "Champagne Cup" match winners: LA Giltinis (1–1)

Bye/s: Utah Warriors

==== Week 11 (April 15–16) ====
April 15	(1 BP) Old Glory DC	22–21	Utah Warriors (1 BP)	Segra Field
20:00 EDT	Try: Junior Sa'u 22'; Peni Lasaqa 33'; Jamason Faʻanana-Schultz 60'; Fintan Coleman 76'; Con: Rohan Saifoloi (1/4) 77'	Report	Try: Caleb Makene 6'; Mike Te'o 42'; Con: Automatic conversion 6'; Calvin Whiting (0/1); Pen: Calvin Whiting (3/4) 29', 36', 48'; Cards: Thomas Tu’avao (yellow card) 59'; James Mocke (yellow card) 74'	Referee: Federico Anselmi (UAR) Assistants: Gavin McCandless (USAR) & Aaron Davis (USAR) TMO: Derek Summers (USAR) Man of the Match: Danny Tusitala (Old Glory DC)

April 16	(1 BP) Toronto Arrows	53–36	New Orleans Gold (1 BP)	York Lions Stadium
12:00 EDT	Try: Isaac Salmon 12'; Ueta Tufuga 35'; Johnny Sheridan 38'; Mitch Richardson 41'; Cole Keith 45'; Giuseppe du Toit 63'; Gordon McRorie 66'; Jack McRogers 75'; Con: Sam Malcolm (3/5) 13', 39', 46'; Automatic conversion (2) 35', 66'; Will Kelly (0/1); Pen: Sam Malcolm (1/2) 20'	Report	Try: Cam Dolan 6'; Harley Wheeler 52'; Moni Tonga'uiha 69'; Juan Cappiello 77'; Nick Feakes 80'; Con: Nick Feakes (2/3) 7', 80+1'; Automatic conversion (2) 52', 69'; Pen: Nick Feakes (1/1) 33'	Referee: Mike Lash (NZR) Assistants: Peter Pender (RC) & Chris Micheletti (RC) TMO: Andrew Hosie (RC) Man of the Match: Ueta Tufuga (Toronto Arrows)

April 16	(1 BP) Seattle Seawolves	34–32	San Diego Legion (2 BP)	Starfire Stadium
15:00 PDT	Try: Martin Iosefo 20'; Juan-Philip Smith 31'; Riekert Hattingh 38'; Dan Kriel 62'; Con: AJ Alatimu (4/4) 21', 32', 39', 63'; Pen: AJ Alatimu (2/2) 44', 49'	Report	Try: Peter Malcolm (2) 27', 75'; Tomas Aoake (2) 40+2', 53'; Chris Turori 69'; Con: Joe Pietersen (1/4) 76'; Automatic conversion 69'; Pen: Joe Pietersen (1/1) 3'; Cards: David Tameilau (yellow card) 59'	Referee: George Selwood (RFU) Assistants: Chris Assmus (RC) & Brad Schwalger (RC) TMO: Shanda Assmus (RC) Man of the Match: AJ Alatimu (Seattle Seawolves)

April 16	LA Giltinis	17–12	Houston SaberCats (1 BP)	Los Angeles Memorial Coliseum
15:00 PDT	Try: Penalty try 17'; Hanco Germishuys 27'; Con: Automatic conversion 17'; Orene Ai'i (1/1) 28'; Pen: Luke Burton (1/1) 79'	Report	Try: Danny Barrett 7'; Christian Dyer 52'; Con: David Coetzer (1/2) 8'; Cards: Jaco Bezuidenhout (yellow card) 17'; Frikkie de Beer (yellow card) 78'	Referee: Luke Rogan (USAR) Assistants: Austin Reed (USAR) & Tim Lew (USAR) TMO: Jack Gohl (RA) Man of the Match: Hanco Germishuys (LA Giltinis)

April 16	Dallas Jackals	3–57	Austin Gilgronis (1 BP)	Choctaw Stadium
20:00 CDT	Pen: Chris Pennell (1/1) 7'	Report	Try: Will Magie 4'; Namatahi Waa 9'; Payton Telea-Ilalio (2) 18', 22'; Mark O'Keeffe (2) 36', 46'; Conner Mooneyham 65'; Casey McDermott Vai 74'; Sidney Shoop 78'; Con: Will Magie (5/8) 5', 10', 19', 66', 75'; Automatic conversion 36'; Cards: Cam Dodson (yellow card) 29'	Referee: Lex Weiner (USAR) Assistants: Scott Green (USAR) & Andrew Low (USAR) TMO: Davey Ardrey (USAR) Man of the Match: Mark O'Keeffe (Austin Gilgronis)

Bye/s: New England Free Jacks, Rugby ATL, Rugby New York

==== Week 12 (April 23–24) ====
April 23	(1 BP) Houston SaberCats	29–17	Toronto Arrows	Aveva Stadium
19:00 CDT	Try: Dean Muir 12'; Juan Pablo Zeiss 20'; Louritz van der Schyff (2) 60', 63'; Con: Kian Meadon (3/4) 13', 21', 61'; Pen: Kian Meadon (1/1) 29'; Cards: Gerrie Labuschagné (red card) 37'; Siaosi Mahoni (yellow card) 55'; Emmanuel Albert (yellow card) 80'	Report	Try: Lolani Faleiva (2) 67', 80+1'; Giuseppe du Toit 75'; Con: Sam Malcolm (1/3) 68'	Referee: Jack Gohl (RA) Assistants: Kat Roche (USAR) & Mitch Damm (USAR) TMO: Davey Ardrey (USAR) Man of the Match: Louritz van der Schyff (Houston Sabercats)

April 23	New Orleans Gold	10–32	Austin Gilgronis (1 BP)	Gold Mine
19:00 CDT	Try: Nick Feakes 14'; Kevin Sullivan 26'; Con: Damian Stevens (0/2)	Report	Try: Hugh Roach 2'; Pele Cowley 7'; Michael de Waal 36'; Lachlan McCaffrey 70'; Con: Will Magie (2/3) 8', 37'; Chris Mattina (1/1) 71'; Pen: Will Magie (2/2) 50', 62'; Cards: Payton Telea-Ilalio (yellow card) 80'	Referee: Federico Anselmi (UAR) Assistants: Allen Alongi (USAR) & Rob Halcomb (USAR) TMO: Derek Summers (USAR) Man of the Match: Hugh Roach (Austin Gilgronis)

April 23	(1 BP) Old Glory DC	50–10	Dallas Jackals	Segra Field
20:00 EDT	Try: Jack Iscaro 11'; Luke Campbell 16'; Rohan Saifoloi 25'; Renata Roberts-Tenana 33'; Tevita Naqali 38'; Peni Lasaqa 53'; Junior Sa'u 68'; William Talataina 78'; Con: Rohan Saifoloi (4/7) 12', 26', 54', 79'; Automatic conversion 38'; Cards: Junior Sa'u (yellow card) 35'	Report	Try: Hayden Hill (2) 43', 60'; Con: Chris Pennell (0/2); Cards: Kelly Kolberg (yellow card) 49'	Referee: Marquise Goodwin (USAR) Assistants: Gavin McCandless (USAR) & Aaron Davis (USAR) TMO: Luke Rogan (USAR) Man of the Match:

April 23	(1 BP) Utah Warriors	14–20	Seattle Seawolves	Zions Bank Stadium
20:00 MDT	Try: Connor Burns 40'; Lance Williams 43'; Con: Automatic conversion 40'; Calvin Whiting (1/1) 44'	Report	Try: Riekert Hattingh (2) 37', 62'; Con: Juan-Philip Smith (2/2) 38', 63'; Pen: Juan-Philip Smith (2/3) 27', 33'; Cards: Riekert Hattingh (yellow card) 5'	Referee: Scott Green (USAR) Assistants: George Selwood (RFU) & Paulo Duarte (FPR) TMO: Chris Assmus (RC) Man of the Match: Riekert Hattingh (Seattle Seawolves)

April 24	(2 BP) Rugby New York	26–29	New England Free Jacks (1 BP)	JFK Stadium
14:30 EDT	Try: Ed Fidow (2) 7', 62'; Nick Civetta 51'; Chance Wenglewski 60'; Con: Jack Heighton (3/4) 8', 52', 61'; Cards: Andy Ellis (yellow card) 35'	Report	Try: Paula Balekana 31'; Beaudein Waaka35'; Wian Conradie 49'; Le Roux Malan 77'; Con: Beaudein Waaka (3/4) 32', 36', 50'; Pen: Beaudein Waaka (1/1) 18'	Referee: Mike Lash (NZR) Assistants: Lex Weiner (USAR) & Miles McIvor (USAR) TMO: Nick Hannon (USAR) Man of the Match: Wian Conradie (New England Free Jacks) 2nd annual "Chowder Cup" match winners (second match): New England Free Jacks (1–1)

April 24	San Diego Legion	17–30	Rugby ATL (1 BP)	SDSU Sports Deck
17:00 PDT	Try: Dan Pryor 39'; Tomas Aoake 56'; Con: Will Hooley (2/2) 40', 57'; Pen: Will Hooley (1/1) 32'; Cards: Ben Mitchell (yellow card) 20'; Ma'a Nonu (yellow card) 75'; Chris Baumann (yellow card) 77'	Report	Try: Penalty try 20'; Te Rangatira Waitokia 36'; Marko Janse van Rensburg 48'; Lui Sitama 79'; Con: Automatic conversion 20'; Joaquín de la Vega Mendía (1/3) 49'; Pen: Joaquín de la Vega Mendía (2/2) 30', 61'	Referee: Marcus Playle (NZR) Assistants: Jacob Gonzalez (USAR) & Alexis Alfaro (USAR) TMO: Austin Reed (USAR) Man of the Match: Matt Heaton (Rugby ATL)

Bye/s: LA Giltinis

==== Week 13 (April 30 – May 1) ====
April 30	Rugby ATL	19–31	LA Giltinis (1 BP)	Silverbacks Park
15:00 EDT	Try: Matt Heaton 23'; Vili Helu 68'; Alex Maughan 73'; Con: Joaquín de la Vega Mendía (2/3) 69', 74'	Report	Try: John Ryberg 3'; Jordan Trainor (2) 26', 39'; Tom Mitchell 37'; Con: Harrison Goddard (4/4) 3', 27', 38', 40'; Pen: Harrison Goddard (1/1) 10'; Cards: Joe Taufeteʻe (yellow card) 23'; Hanco Germishuys (red card) 59'; Leslie Leuluaʻialiʻi-Makin (yellow card) 72'	Referee: Federico Anselmi (UAR) Assistants: Henrique Platais (CBRu) & Dave Edwards (USAR) TMO: Nick Hannon (USAR) Man of the Match:

April 30	(1 BP) New England Free Jacks	33–17	Utah Warriors	Veterans Memorial Stadium
16:30 EDT	Try: Mitch Wilson 2'; Pieter Jansen (2) 22', 47'; John Poland 34'; Slade McDowall 74'; Con: Beaudein Waaka (4/5) 3', 23', 35', 75'; Pen: Beaudein Waaka (0/1); Cards: Paula Balekana (yellow card) 66'	Report	Try: Caleb Makene 37'; Joseph Mano 71'; Con: Calvin Whiting (2/2) 38', 72'; Pen: Calvin Whiting (1/1) 27'	Referee: George Selwood (RFU) Assistants: Amelia Luciano (USAR) & Jarrod Ford (USAR) TMO: Luke Rogan (USAR) Man of the Match: Paula Balekana (New England Free Jacks)

April 30	Dallas Jackals	14–53	San Diego Legion (1 BP)	Choctaw Stadium
19:00 CDT	Try: JP Aguirre 23'; Matoko Noudéhou 59'; Con: Chris Pennell (2/2) 24', 60'; Cards: Herman Agenbag (yellow card) 15'; Asa Carter (yellow card) 75'; Tommy Madaras (yellow card) 78'	Report	Try: Chris Robshaw 4'; Peter Malcolm (2) 16', 48'; Jason Higgins 26'; Ben Mitchell 31'; Ryan Matyas 42'; Matías Freyre 67'; Chris Baumann 80'; Con: Will Hooley (5/6) 5', 27', 32', 43', 49'; Joe Pietersen (0/2); Pen: Will Hooley (1/1) 11'; Cards: Tiaan Loots (yellow card) 20'	Referee: Moe Chaudhry (RC) Assistants: De Wet Roos (USAR) & Cole Jones (USAR) TMO: Jack Gohl (RA) Man of the Match: Ryan Matyas (San Diego Legion)

May 1	(1 BP) Rugby New York	36–28	New Orleans Gold (1 BP)	JFK Stadium
15:00 EDT	Try: Andy Ellis 12'; Kara Pryor 20'; Dylan Fawsitt (2) 32', 80'; Ed Fidow 40'; Con: Jack Heighton (4/5) 13', 21', 33', 40'; Pen: Jack Heighton (1/1) 52'	Report	Try: Kevin Sullivan 27'; Juan Cappiello 54'; Damian Stevens 56'; JP Eloff 75'; Con: Damian Stevens (4/4) 28', 55', 57', 76'	Referee: Paulo Duarte (FPR) Assistants: Lex Weiner (USAR) & Will Nelson (USAR) TMO: Miles McIvor (USAR) Man of the Match: Dylan Fawsitt (Rugby New York)

May 1	Austin Gilgronis	17–6	Seattle Seawolves	Bold Stadium
18:00 CDT	Try: Hugh Roach 26'; Mark O'Keeffe 35'; Con: Will Magie (1/1) 27'; Automatic conversion 35'; Pen: Will Magie (1/2) 79'	Report	Pen: AJ Alatimu (2/3) 15', 31'	Referee: Marcus Playle (NZR) Assistants: Scott Green (USAR) & Joey Swatzell (USAR) TMO: Derek Summers (USAR) Man of the Match: Isaac Ross (Austin Gilgronis)

Bye/s: Houston SaberCats, Old Glory DC, Toronto Arrows

==== Week 14 (May 7–8) ====
May 7	(1 BP) New England Free Jacks	26–20	Old Glory DC (1 BP)	Veterans Memorial Stadium
19:00 EDT	Try: Mills Sanerivi 6'; Jesse Parete 37'; Wayne van der Bank 55'; Slade McDowall 77'; Con: Beaudein Waaka (2/2) 7', 38'; Automatic conversion 55'; John Poland (0/1)	Report	Try: Doug Fraser (2) 13', 80'; Junior Sa'u 48'; Con: Rohan Saifoloi (1/2) 49'; Danny Thomas (0/1); Pen: Rohan Saifoloi (1/1) 35'; Cards: Tevita Naqali (yellow card) 4'	Referee: Chris Assmus (RC) Assistants: Amelia Luciano (USAR) & Jarrod Ford (USAR) TMO: Davey Ardrey (USAR) Man of the Match:

May 7	(1 BP) Utah Warriors	44–26	Rugby ATL (1 BP)	Zions Bank Stadium
20:00 MDT	Try: Joseph Mano (2) 10', 80'; Lance Williams (2) 23', 60'; Caleb Makene 29'; Thomas Tu’avao 41'; Con: Calvin Whiting (3/5) 24', 61', 80+1'; Automatic conversion 41'; Pen: Calvin Whiting (2/3) 4', 38'; Drop: Cliven Loubser (0/1)	Report	Try: Connor Cook (2) 5', 14'; Alex Maughan 33'; Tiaan Eramsus 46'; Con: Kurt Coleman (2/3) 15', 47'; Automatic conversion 33'	Referee: Derek Summers (USAR) Assistants: Kahlil Harrison (USAR) & Kage Green (USAR) TMO: Jack Gohl (RA) Man of the Match:

May 8	Toronto Arrows	17–41	Rugby New York (1 BP)	York Lions Stadium
12:00 EDT	Try: Cole Brown 21'; Lolani Faleiva 48'; Con: Sam Malcolm (1/1) 22'; Automatic conversion 48'; Pen: Sam Malcolm (1/1) 52'	Report	Try: Kalolo Tuiloma 7'; Ed Fidow (2) 11', 23'; Jack Heighton 18'; Dylan Fawsitt 60'; Brendon O'Connor 64'; Faʻasui Fuatai 79'; Con: Jack Heighton (2/6) 12', 24'; Sam Windsor (1/1) 80'	Referee: Marcus Playle (NZR) Assistants: Michael Jones (RC) & Peter Pender (RC) TMO: Andrew Hosie (RC) Man of the Match:

May 8	LA Giltinis	10–8	Austin Gilgronis (1 BP)	Los Angeles Memorial Coliseum
15:00 PDT	Try: Ben LeSage 30'; Con: Harrison Goddard (1/1) 31'; Pen: Harrison Goddard (1/2) 13'	Report	Try: Chris Mattina 80+3'; Con: Will Magie (0/1); Pen: Will Magie (1/3) 16'	Referee: Mike Lash (NZR) Assistants: Jack Gohl (RA) & Tim Lew (USAR) TMO: Austin Reed (USAR) Man of the Match: Dave Dennis (LA Giltinis)

May 8	San Diego Legion	24–34	Houston SaberCats (1 BP)	SDSU Sports Deck
16:00 PDT	Try: Peter Malcolm 4'; Ryan Matyas 58'; Con: Will Hooley (1/2) 59'; Pen: Will Hooley (4/4) 21', 40', 43', 71'; Cards: Paddy Ryan (yellow card) 65'	Report	Try: Gideon van Wyk 7'; Kian Meadon 25'; Marcell Muller 36'; Juan Pablo Zeiss 56'; Dean Muir 66'; Zachary Pangelinan 79'; Con: Kian Meadon (2/5) 8', 57'; David Coetzer (0/1); Pen: Kian Meadon (0/1); Cards: Matai Leuta (yellow card) 47'	Referee: Paulo Duarte (FPR) Assistants: Marquise Goodwin (USAR) & Alexis Alfaro (USAR) TMO: Kahlil Harrison (USAR) Man of the Match: Gideon van Wyk (Houston Sabercats)

May 8	(1 BP) Seattle Seawolves	74–7	Dallas Jackals	Starfire Stadium
19:00 PDT	Try: Dan Kriel 1'; Andrew Durutalo 12'; Riekert Hattingh (2) 19', 34'; Sam Matenga (2) 31', 43'; Ross Neal (2) 45', 76'; Lauina Futi (2) 49', 56'; Sean McNulty 62'; Con: AJ Alatimu (8/11) 13', 20', 32', 34', 44', 46', 50', 63'; Pen: AJ Alatimu (1/1) 17'; Cards: Riekert Hattingh (yellow card) 58'	Report	Try: Carlo de Nysschen 8'; Con: Chris Pennell (1/1) 9'	Referee: Kat Roche (USAR) Assistants: Brad Schwalger (RC) & Brett Johnson (USAR) TMO: Shanda Assmus (RC) Man of the Match: Duncan Matthews (Seattle Seawolves)

Bye/s: New Orleans Gold

==== Week 15 (May 13–15) ====
May 13	New England Free Jacks	15–10	Rugby ATL (1 BP)	Veterans Memorial Stadium
19:00 EDT	Try: Wian Conradie 5'; Slade McDowall 75'; Con: Beaudein Waaka (1/2) 6'; Pen: Beaudein Waaka (1/1) 22'; Cards: Jesse Parete (yellow card) 21'; Slade McDowall (yellow card) 52'; Josh Larsen (yellow card) 63'	Report	Try: Marko Janse van Rensburg 32'; Con: Joaquín de la Vega Mendía (1/1) 33'; Pen: Joaquín de la Vega Mendía (1/3) 80+2'; Cards: Johan Momsen (yellow card) 21'; Jason Damm (yellow card) 38'	Referee: George Selwood (RFU) Assistants: Lex Weiner (USAR) & Nick Tricarico (USAR) TMO: Davey Ardrey (USAR) Man of the Match: Paula Balekana (New England Free Jacks)

May 14	(1 BP) Toronto Arrows	57–0	Dallas Jackals	York Lions Stadium
19:00 EDT	Try: Ross Braude 5'; James O'Neill 21'; Giuseppe du Toit 25'; Ronan Foley 27'; Gastón Mieres 30'; Lolani Faleiva 39'; Jack McRogers (2) 56', 73'; Con: Will Kelly (7/8) 6', 26', 28', 31', 40', 57', 74'; Pen: Will Kelly (1/1) 13'	Report		Referee: Chris Micheletti (RC) Assistants: Mike Jones (RC) & Peter Pender (RC) TMO: Andrew Hosie (RC) Man of the Match: Lolani Faleiva (Toronto Arrows)

May 14	(1 BP) Houston SaberCats	31–27	Utah Warriors (2 BP)	Aveva Stadium
19:00 CDT	Try: David Coetzer 10'; Louritz van der Schyff 19'; Dean Muir 38'; Zachary Pangelinan 57'; Gideon van Wyk 78'; Con: David Coetzer (1/3) 39'; Automatic conversion (2) 57', 78'; Cards: Juan Pablo Zeiss (yellow card) 25'; Marno Redelinghuys (yellow card) 46'	Report	Try: Saia Uhila 27'; Joseph Mano (2) 30', 47'; Chad Gough 80'; Con: Automatic conversion 27'; Calvin Whiting (1/3) 31'; Pen: Calvin Whiting (1/1) 4'	Referee: Scott Green (USAR) Assistants: Andrew Low (USAR) & Brian Dusablon (USAR) TMO: Luke Rogan (USAR) Man of the Match: David Coetzer (Houston Sabercats)

May 14	(1 BP) New Orleans Gold	50–21	Old Glory DC	Gold Mine
19:00 CDT	Try: Pat O'Toole (2) 2', 57'; Penalty try 7'; Devin Short 10'; Harley Wheeler (3) 22', 66', 70'; Con: Damian Stevens (3/3) 3', 23', 58'; Automatic conversion (2) 7', 10'; JP Eloff (1/2) 67'; Pen: Damian Stevens (1/1) 52'	Report	Try: Luke Campbell 19'; Peni Lasaqa 37'; Rohan Saifoloi 80'; Con: Rohan Saifoloi (2/2) 20', 38'; Automatic conversion 80'; Cards: Jack Iscaro (yellow card) 7'	Referee: Jack Gohl (RA) Assistants: De Wet Roos (USAR) & Allen Alongi (USAR) TMO: Derek Summers (USAR) Man of the Match: Juan Cappiello (New Orleans Gold)

May 15	(1 BP) Rugby New York	30–22	Seattle Seawolves	JFK Stadium
15:00 EDT	Try: Andrew Coe 5'; Dylan Fawsitt 44'; Kaleb Geiger 63'; Penalty try 77'; Con: Jack Heighton (1/) 6'; Automatic conversion 77'; Pen: Jack Heighton (2/2) 10', 40'; Cards: Will Tucker (yellow card) 18'	Report	Try: Penalty try 18'; Dan Kriel 56'; Martin Iosefo 68'; Con: Automatic conversion 18'; AJ Alatimu (1/1) 57'; Pen: AJ Alatimu (1/1) 34'; Cards: Rhyno Herbst (yellow card) 75'	Referee: Mike Lash (NZR) Assistants: Lex Weiner (USAR) & Gavin McCandless (USAR) TMO: Miles McIvor (USAR) Man of the Match: Andrew Coe (Rugby New York)

May 15	San Diego Legion	31–27	LA Giltinis (2 BP)	SDSU Sports Deck
18:30 PDT	Try: Joe Pietersen 17'; Ma'a Nonu 50'; Matías Freyre 72'; Con: Joe Pietersen (2/3) 18', 51'; Pen: Will Hooley (0/1); Joe Pietersen (4/4) 6', 21', 29', 36'; Drop: Will Hooley (0/1); Ma'a Nonu (0/1)	Report	Try: Andrew Tuala (2) 11', 58'; Will Chambers 31'; Cyrille Cama 75'; Con: Harrison Goddard (1/3) 12'; Luke Burton (1/1) 76'; Pen: Luke Burton (1/1) 67'	Referee: Federico Anselmi (UAR) Assistants: Marquise Goodwin (USAR) & Alexis Alfaro (USAR) TMO: Austin Reed (USAR) Man of the Match: Joe Pietersen (San Diego Legion)

Bye/s: Austin Gilgronis

==== Week 16 (May 19–22) ====
May 19	(1 BP) Toronto Arrows	33–18	New England Free Jacks	York Lions Stadium
19:00 EDT	Try: Andrew Quattrin 16'; Giuseppe du Toit 45'; Gastón Mieres 56'; Matthew Hood 73'; Con: Sam Malcolm (1/3) 17'; Automatic conversion 45'; Pen: Sam Malcolm (3/3) 25', 29', 35'; Cards: Andrew Quattrin (yellow card) 19'	Report	Try: Mills Sanerivi 8'; Quentin Newcomer 63'; Con: John Poland (0/1); Mitch Wilson (1/1) 64'; Pen: John Poland (2/2) 2', 12'; Cards: Mills Sanerivi (yellow card) 45'	Referee: Luke Rogan (USAR) Assistants: Chris Micheletti (RC) & Peter Pender (RC) TMO: Chris Assmus (RC) Man of the Match:

May 21	(1 BP) Old Glory DC	42–59	Houston SaberCats (1 BP)	Segra Field
13:00 EDT	Try: William Talataina (2) 7', 52'; Renata Roberts-Tenana (2) 14', 57'; Peni Lasaqa 21'; Junior Sa'u 70'; Con: Rohan Saifoloi (5/5) 8', 15', 22', 58', 71'; Automatic conversion 52'; Pen: Rohan Saifoloi (0/1); Cards: Apisai Naikatini (red card) 11'; Fintan Coleman (yellow card) 26'; Felix Kalapu (yellow card) 44'	Report	Try: Dean Muir (4) 3', 12', 30', 48'; Robbie Povey 24'; Dillon Smit 62'; Louritz van der Schyff 74'; Nick Boyer 79'; Matai Leuta 80+1'; Con: David Coetzer (5/6) 4', 13', 25', 31', 63'; Robbie Povey (1/2) 75'; Automatic conversion 80+1'	Referee: Federico Anselmi (UAR) Assistants: Aaron Davis (USAR) & Craig Sakowski (USAR) TMO: Nick Hannon (USAR) Man of the Match:

May 21	Dallas Jackals	12–56	LA Giltinis (1 BP)	Choctaw Stadium
19:00 CDT	Try: Conrado Roura 38'; Lui Sitama 72'; Con: Adriaan Carelse (1/2) 39'	Report	Try: Bill Meakes 32'; Lindsey Stevens (2) 43', 56'; John Ryberg 45'; Ben LeSage 53'; Harrison Goddard 70'; Sam Peri 76'; Marco Fepulea'i 80'; Con: Automatic conversion (2) 32', 76'; Luke Burton (2/2) 44', 46'; Luke Carty (4/4) 54', 57', 71', 80+1'	Referee: Chris Assmus (RC) Assistants: Shawn Martin (USAR) & Cole Jones (USAR) TMO: Davey Ardrey (USAR) Man of the Match: Lindsey Stevens (LA Giltinis)

May 21	New Orleans Gold	12–42	San Diego Legion (1 BP)	Gold Mine
19:00 CDT	Try: Penalty try 29'; Aaron Matthews 65'; Con: Automatic conversion 29'; JP Eloff (0/1); Cards: Maciu Koroi (red card) 72'	Report	Try: Michael Smith 20'; Jason Higgins (3) 23', 34', 63'; David Tameilau 40+1'; Joe Pietersen 80'; Con: Joe Pietersen (5/5) 21', 24', 35', 40+2', 80+1'; Automatic conversion 63'; Drop: Joe Pietersen (0/1); Cards: Michael Smith (yellow card) 29'	Referee: George Selwood (RFU) Assistants: Allen Alongi (USAR) & Saade Bou-Mikael (USAR) TMO: Derek Summers (USAR) Man of the Match: Jason Higgins (San Diego Legion)

May 21	Utah Warriors	22–8	Austin Gilgronis	Zions Bank Stadium
20:00 MDT	Try: Zion Going 27'; Paul Lasike 66'; Niall Saunders 73'; Con: Calvin Whiting (2/3) 28', 67'; Pen: Calvin Whiting (1/1) 44'	Report	Try: Robbie Coetzee 12'; Con: Will Magie (0/1); Pen: Will Magie (1/1) 31'; Cards: Julián Domínguez (yellow card) 15'; Lachlan McCaffrey (yellow card) 62'	Referee: Paulo Duarte (FPR) Assistants: Mike Lash (NZR) & Kage Green (USAR) TMO: Austin Reed (USAR) Man of the Match:

May 22	Rugby New York	3–38	Rugby ATL (1 BP)	JFK Stadium
15:00 EDT	Pen: Jack Heighton (1/2) 22'; Cards: Will Tucker (red card) 16'	Report	Try: Ryan Rees 7'; Daemon Torres 18'; Alex Maughan 36'; Austin White 55'; Johan Momsen 74'; Vili Helu 80'; Con: Kurt Coleman (3/4) 8', 19', 75'; Joaquín de la Vega Mendía (1/1) 56'; Duncan van Schalkwyk (0/1); Cards: Will Burke (yellow card) 61'	Referee: Marcus Playle (NZR) Assistants: Lex Weiner (USAR) & Henrique Platais (CBRu) TMO: Nick Hannon (USAR) Man of the Match: Ryan Rees (Rugby ATL)

Bye/s: Seattle Seawolves

==== Week 17 (May 27–29) ====
May 27	(1 BP) Seattle Seawolves	43–36	Houston SaberCats (2 BP)	Starfire Stadium
19:30 PDT	Try: Duncan Matthews 9'; Martin Iosefo (2) 11', 48'; Dan Kriel 20'; Tavite Lopeti 30'; Mzamo Majola 70'; Con: AJ Alatimu (5/6) 12', 21', 31', 49', 71'; Pen: AJ Alatimu (1/2) 40+1'; Drop: AJ Alatimu (0/1); Cards: AJ Alatimu (yellow card) 80'	Report	Try: Matai Leuta 14'; Louritz van der Schyff 41'; Christian Dyer 56'; Nick Boyer 75'; Zachary Pangelinan 77'; Con: David Coetzer (2/3) 15', 42'; Robbie Povey (2/2) 76', 78'; Pen: Robbie Povey (1/1) 80+1'	Referee: Marcus Playle (NZR) Assistants: Kat Roche (USAR) & Brad Schwalger (RC) TMO: Chris Assmus (RC) Man of the Match: AJ Alatimu (Seattle Seawolves)

May 28	(1 BP) Rugby ATL	34–23	Toronto Arrows	Silverbacks Park
15:00 EDT	Try: Johan Momsen 4'; Tiaan Eramsus 35'; Kurt Coleman 39'; Te Rangatira Waitokia 47'; Con: Automatic conversion 4'; Kurt Coleman (3/3) 36', 40', 48'; Pen: Kurt Coleman (1/1) 61'; Joaquín de la Vega Mendía (1/1) 65'	Report	Try: Johnny Sheridan 20'; Ross Braude 29'; Con: Sam Malcolm (2/2) 21', 30'; Pen: Sam Malcolm (3/4) 10', 18', 25'	Referee: Federico Anselmi (UAR) Assistants: Gavin McCandless (USAR) & Dave Edwards (USAR) TMO: Austin Reed (USAR) Man of the Match: Tiaan Eramsus (Rugby ATL)

May 28	(2 BP) Utah Warriors	32–39	LA Giltinis (1 BP)	Zions Bank Stadium
14:30 MDT	Try: Paul Lasike 12'; Chad Gough 24'; Jurie van Vuuren 41'; Olive Kilifi 67'; Joseph Mano 79'; Con: Calvin Whiting (2/4) 25', 68'; Mike Te'o (0/1); Pen: Calvin Whiting (1/1) 62'; Cards: Joseph Mano (yellow card) 39'; Connor Burns (yellow card) 45'; Niall Saunders (yellow card) 56'; Niall Saunders (red card) 80+1'	Report	Try: Charlie Abel 7'; Christian Poidevin 39'; Lindsey Stevens 46'; Andrew Tuala 58'; Hanco Germishuys 70'; Con: Luke Carty (4/5) 8', 40', 47', 71'; Pen: Luke Carty (2/2) 22', 30'	Referee: Derek Summers (USAR) Assistants: Kahlil Harrison (USAR) & Brett Johnson (USAR) TMO: Mike Lash (NZR) Man of the Match: Luke Carty (LA Giltinis)

May 28	(1 BP) Austin Gilgronis	44–28	San Diego Legion (1 BP)	Bold Stadium
19:00 CDT	Try: Ryan Louwrens 7'; Jake Turnbull (2) 22', 29'; Luke Beauchamp 32'; Hugh Roach 57'; Con: Mack Mason (4/4) 8', 23', 30', 33'; Chris Mattina (1/1) 58'; Pen: Mack Mason (2/2) 17', 48'; Chris Mattina (1/1) 66'	Report	Try: Hencus van Wyk 13'; Tomas Aoake 39'; Ryan Matyas 61'; Michael Smith 76'; Con: Joe Pietersen (3/3) 14', 40', 77'; Automatic conversion 61'	Referee: Jack Gohl (RA) Assistants: Kat Roche (USAR) & Cole Jones (USAR) TMO: Luke Rogan (USAR) Man of the Match: Lachlan McCaffrey (Austin Gilgronis)

May 29	(1 BP) Old Glory DC	49–59	Rugby New York (1 BP)	Segra Field
14:30 EDT	Try: Doug Fraser 6'; William Talataina (2) 20', 38'; Rohan Saifoloi 55'; Josh Brown 62'; Junior Sa'u 68'; Renata Roberts-Tenana 79'; Con: Rohan Saifoloi (6/6) 7', 21', 39', 57', 69', 80'; Automatic conversion 63'; Cards: Stan South (yellow card) 10'	Report	Try: Penalty try 10'; Waisake Naholo (2) 15', 49'; Kaleb Geiger 27'; Ed Fidow (3) 32', 46', 52'; Conor McManus 41'; Andy Ellis 58'; Con: Automatic conversion 10'; Sam Windsor (6/7) 28', 33', 42', 47', 50', 53'; Andy Ellis (0/1); Cards: Chance Wenglewski (yellow card) 62'	Referee: George Selwood (RFU) Assistants: Gavin McCandless (USAR) & Aaron Davis (USAR) TMO: Kahlil Harrison (USAR) Man of the Match: Ed Fidow (Rugby New York)

May 29	(1 BP) New England Free Jacks	57–5	New Orleans Gold	Veterans Memorial Stadium
18:30 EDT	Try: Mitch Wilson (3) 5', 40', 66'; Mills Sanerivi 9'; Dougie Fife 33'; Le Roux Malan (2) 57', 58'; Joe Johnston 62'; Con: Beaudein Waaka (5/6) 6', 10', 40+1', 59', 63'; Automatic conversion 57'; Mitch Wilson (1/1) 67'; Pen: Beaudein Waaka (1/1) 28'; Cards: Wian Conradie (yellow card) 78'	Report	Try: Aaron Matthews 80'; Con: Cam Dolan (0/1)	Referee: Paulo Duarte (FPR) Assistants: Amelia Luciano (USAR) & Chris Micheletti (RC) TMO: Nick Hannon (USAR) Man of the Match: Mitch Wilson (New England Free Jacks)

Bye/s: Dallas Jackals

==== Week 18 (June 3–5) ====
June 3	(1 BP) Rugby ATL	45–19	New Orleans Gold	Silverbacks Park
19:00 EDT	Try: Duncan van Schalkwyk 13'; Connor Cook 26'; Tiaan Eramsus (2) 49', 58'; Will Leonard 52'; Alex Maughan 68'; Te Rangatira Waitokia 77'; Con: Automatic conversion 13'; Kurt Coleman (4/6) 27', 53', 69', 78'	Report	Try: Pat O'Toole 7'; Ross Depperschmidt 15'; Devin Short 35'; Con: JP Eloff (2/3) 16', 36'; Cards: Osaiasi Tonga'uiha (yellow card) 23'; Billy Stewart (yellow card) 73'	Referee: Moe Chaudhry (RC) Assistants: Cisco Lopez (USAR) & Henrique Platais (CBRu) TMO: Nick Hannon (USAR) Man of the Match: Johan Momsen (Rugby ATL)

June 3	(1 BP) New England Free Jacks	14–21	Rugby New York	Veterans Memorial Stadium
19:00 EDT	Try: Paula Balekana 19'; Terrell Peita 39'; Con: Beaudein Waaka (2/2) 20', 40'; Cards: Beaudein Waaka (yellow card) 50'	Report	Try: Kalolo Tuiloma 4'; Andy Ellis 13'; Kaleb Geiger 25'; Con: Sam Windsor (3/3) 5', 14', 26'; Cards: Andy Ellis (yellow card) 50'; Wilton Rebolo (yellow card) 78'	Referee: Federico Anselmi (UAR) Assistants: Amelia Luciano (USAR) & Jarrod Ford (USAR) TMO: Miles McIvor (USAR) Man of the Match: Andy Ellis (Rugby New York)

June 3	Houston SaberCats	14–29	Austin Gilgronis (1 BP)	Aveva Stadium
20:00 CDT	Try: Emmanuel Albert 37'; Axel Zapata 58'; Con: Kian Meadon (2/2) 38', 59'; Cards: Gerrie Labuschagné (yellow card) 63'; Maikeli Naromaitoga (red card) 63'	Report	Try: Bryce Campbell 9'; Zinzan Elan-Puttick 23'; Fakaʻosi Pifeleti 31'; Hugh Roach 72'; Con: Automatic conversion (2) 9', 31'; Mack Mason (1/1) 24'; Will Magie (0/1); Pen: Mack Mason (1/1) 63'; Cards: Pele Cowley (yellow card) 47'; Jake Turnbull (red card) 63'	Referee: Luke Rogan (USAR) Assistants: Paulo Duarte (FPR) & Kat Roche (USAR) TMO: Derek Summers (USAR) Man of the Match:

June 4	Dallas Jackals	5–33	Utah Warriors (1 BP)	Choctaw Stadium
19:00 CDT	Try: Carlo de Nysschen 5'; Con: Adriaan Carelse (0/1)	Report	Try: Danny Christensen (3) 35', 53', 63'; Tyler Fisher 54'; Joseph Mano 80'; Con: Connor Burns (1/1) 36'; Automatic conversion (3) 53', 54', 63'; Coleson Warner (0/1); Cards: Joseph Mano (yellow card) 59'	Referee: Jack Gohl (RA) Assistants: Kat Roche (USAR) & Andrew Low (USAR) TMO: Derek Summers (USAR) Man of the Match: Danny Christensen (Utah Warriors)

June 5	(1 BP) Toronto Arrows	35–50	Old Glory DC (1 BP)	York Lions Stadium
12:00 EDT	Try: Dennon Robinson-Bartlett 1'; Ronan Foley 11'; Paul Ciulini (2) 19', 44'; Marcello Wainwright 80'; Con: Automatic conversion 1'; Sam Malcolm (3/3) 12', 20', 45'; Will Kelly (1/1) 80+1'	Report	Try: Cory Daniel 9'; Peni Lasaqa 16'; Junior Sa'u 23'; Tevita Naqali 28'; Felix Kalapu 51'; Danny Tusitala 56'; Renata Roberts-Tenana 68'; William Talataina 72'; Con: Rohan Saifoloi (3/6) 17', 29', 73'; Automatic conversion (2) 51', 56'	Referee: Mike Lash (NZR) Assistants: Michael Jones (RC) & Peter Pender (RC) TMO: Andrew Hosie (RC) Man of the Match:

June 5	LA Giltinis	27–35	Seattle Seawolves (1 BP)	Los Angeles Memorial Coliseum
15:00 PDT	Try: Bill Meakes 6'; Cristian Rodriguez 41'; Charlie Abel 56'; Con: Automatic conversion 6'; Luke Carty (3/3) 42', 57', 69'; Pen: Harrison Goddard (1/1) 17'; Luke Carty (1/1) 23'; Cards: Luke Carty (yellow card) 9'; Cyrille Cama (yellow card) 65'	Report	Try: Lauina Futi 13'; Martin Iosefo 30'; James Malcolm 54'; Duncan Matthews 74'; Con: AJ Alatimu (3/4) 14', 55', 75'; Pen: AJ Alatimu (3/3) 4', 10', 61'	Referee: Scott Green (USAR) Assistants: Marquise Goodwin (USAR) & Austin Reed (USAR) TMO: Jack Gohl (RA) Man of the Match: Martin Iosefo (Seattle Seawolves)

Bye/s: San Diego Legion

== Playoffs ==
=== Competition controversy ===
On June 7, due to breaches of the salary cap rules, Major League Rugby disqualified the two top teams in the Western Conference, the Austin Gilgronis and the LA Giltinis, from the playoffs. After the Seattle Seawolves defeated the San Diego Legion in the Western Conference Eliminator, the Houston SaberCats hosted the Western Conference Final against the Seawolves at Aveva Stadium. The match served as Houston's first appearance in the MLR playoffs.

=== Bracket ===
Quarterfinals
2	Rugby ATL	19
3	Rugby United New York	26
2	Seattle Seawolves	43
3	San Diego Legion	19

Semifinals
1	New England Free Jacks	16
3	Rugby United New York	24
1	Houston Sabercats	27
2	Seattle Seawolves	46

Finals
3	Rugby United New York	30
2	Seattle Seawolves	15

=== Eliminators (June 11) ===
June 11	Rugby ATL	19–26	Rugby New York	Silverbacks Park
20:30 EDT	Try: Kurt Coleman 80+2'; Con: Kurt Coleman (1/1) 80+3'; Pen: Kurt Coleman (4/4) 34', 40+2', 58', 65'; Cards: Connor Cook (yellow card) 2'	Report	Try: Penalty try 44'; Dylan Fawsitt 73'; Con: Automatic conversion 44'; Jason Emery (1/1) 74'; Pen: Jason Emery (4/4) 4', 19', 27', 79'; Cards: Nick Civetta (yellow card) 50'	Referee: Mike Lash (NZR) Assistants: Federico Anselmi (UAR) & Jack Gohl (RA) TMO: Nick Hannon (USAR) Man of the Match: Dylan Fawsitt (Rugby New York)

June 12	Seattle Seawolves	43–19	San Diego Legion	Starfire Sports Stadium
19:00 PDT	Try: Sam Matenga 11'; Duncan Matthews 19'; Travis Larsen 62'; Ross Neal 67'; Con: AJ Alatimu (3/3) 12', 20', 68'; Automatic conversion 62'; Pen: AJ Alatimu (5/5) 7', 14', 46', 56', 74'; Cards: Riekert Hattingh (yellow card) 50'	Report	Try: Nate Augspurger 2'; Tevita Tameilau 28'; Jason Higgins 77'; Con: Joe Pietersen (2/2) 3', 29'; Josh Henderson (0/1)	Referee: Scott Green (USAR) Assistants: Luke Rogan (USAR) & Lex Weiner (USAR) TMO: Austin Reed (USAR) Man of the Match: Duncan Matthews (Seattle Seawolves)

=== Conference Finals (June 18–19) ===
June 18	Houston SaberCats	27–46	Seattle Seawolves	Aveva Stadium
19:00 EDT	Try: David Coetzer 6'; Gerrie Labuschagné 42'; Christian Dyer (2) 47', 75'; Con: David Coetzer (2/4) 7', 48'; Pen: Gerrie Labuschagné (1/1) 13'	Report	Try: James Malcolm 17'; Juan-Philip Smith 29'; Duncan Matthews (2) 31', 60'; Mzamo Majola 54'; Ross Neal 57'; Con: AJ Alatimu (4/5) 32', 55', 58', 61'; Automatic conversion 29'; Pen: AJ Alatimu (2/2) 9', 24'	Attendance: 2,341; Referee: Scott Green (USAR) Assistants: Luke Rogan (USAR) & Kahlil Harrison (USAR) TMO: Derek Summers (USAR) Man of the Match: AJ Alatimu (Seattle Seawolves)

June 19	New England Free Jacks	16–24	Rugby New York	Veterans Memorial Stadium
15:00 EDT	Try: Beaudein Waaka 4'; Con: Beaudein Waaka (1/1) 5'; Pen: Beaudein Waaka (3/3) 17', 28', 46'; Cards: Reegan O'Gorman (yellow card) 73'	Report	Try: Benjamín Bonasso 19'; Nehe Milner-Skudder 69'; Andrew Coe 76'; Con: Jason Emery (1/1) 20'; Sam Windsor (2/2) 70', 77'; Pen: Jason Emery (1/2) 32'	Attendance: 3,500; Referee: Federico Anselmi (UAR) Assistants: Mike Lash (NZR) & Cisco Lopez (USAR) TMO: Nick Hannon (USAR) Man of the Match: Andrew Coe (Rugby New York)

=== Championship final (June 25) ===
June 25	Rugby New York	30–15	Seattle Seawolves	Red Bull Arena
12:00 EDT	Try: Will Tucker 8'; Penalty try 24'; Andy Ellis 35'; Nic Mayhew '56; Con: Jason Emery (1/3) 9'; Automatic conversion 24'; Pen: Jason Emery (1/2) 50'; Drop: Sam Windsor (1/1) 73'; Cards: Will Tucker (yellow card) 66'	Report	Try: Martin Iosefo 4'; Sam Matenga 61'; Con: AJ Alatimu (1/2) 62'; Pen: AJ Alatimu (1/1) 13'; Cards: Rhyno Herbst (yellow card) 24'	Attendance: 1,979; Referee: Federico Anselmi (UAR) Assistants: Mike Lash (NZR) & Cisco Lopez (USAR) TMO: Nick Hannon (USAR) Man of the Match: Andy Ellis (Rugby New York)

== Player statistics ==
=== Top scorers ===
The top ten try and point scorers during the 2022 Major League Rugby season were:

Last updated: June 26, 2022

Most tries
No	Player	Team	Tries
1	(Samoa) Ed Fidow	Rugby New York	12
2	(United States) Riekert Hattingh	Seattle Seawolves	10
2	(South Africa) Dean Muir	Houston SaberCats	10
4	(South Africa) Marko Janse van Rensburg	Rugby ATL	9
4	(New Zealand) Peni Lasaqa	Old Glory DC	9
6	(United States) Hanco Germishuys	LA Giltinis	8
6	(New Zealand) Slade McDowall	New England Free Jacks	8
6	(Ireland) Mark O'Keeffe	Austin Gilgronis	8
6	(New Zealand) Renata Roberts-Tenana	Old Glory DC	8
6	(Samoa) William Talataina	Old Glory DC	8
6	(New Zealand) Beaudein Waaka	New England Free Jacks	8

Most points
No	Player	Team	Pts
1	(Samoa) AJ Alatimu	Seattle Seawolves	166
2	(New Zealand) Beaudein Waaka	New England Free Jacks	154
3	(South Africa) Joe Pietersen	San Diego Legion	146
4	(New Zealand) Sam Malcolm	Toronto Arrows	100
5	(Australia) Mack Mason	Austin Gilgronis	86
6	(South Africa) Kurt Coleman	Rugby ATL	83
7	(South Africa) David Coetzer	Houston SaberCats	79
8	(Argentina) Joaquín de la Vega Mendía	Rugby ATL	76
8	(Australia) Rohan Saifoloi	Old Glory DC	76
10	(New Zealand) Jack Heighton	Rugby New York	67

=== Sanctions ===
Player	Team	Red	Yellow
(South Africa) Gerrie Labuschagné	Houston SaberCats	2	1
(Fiji) Apisai Naikatini	Old Glory DC	1	1
(Ireland) Niall Saunders	Utah Warriors	1	1
(New Zealand) Slade McDowall	New England Free Jacks	1	1
(England) Matt Frings	Dallas Jackals	1	0
(South Africa) Hanco Germishuys	LA Giltinis	1	0
(Fiji) Maciu Koroi	New Orleans Gold	1	0
(Fiji) Maikeli Naromaitoga	Houston SaberCats	1	0
(United States) Jake Turnbull	Austin Gilgronis	1	0
(New Zealand) Will Tucker	Rugby New York	1	1
(United States) Riekert Hattingh	Seattle Seawolves	0	3
(United States) Nate Brakeley	Rugby New York	0	2
(United States) Kisi Unufe	Houston SaberCats	0	2
(Fiji) Keni Nasoqeqe	Houston SaberCats	0	2
(New Zealand) Ma'a Nonu	San Diego Legion	0	2
(Australia) Leslie Leulua'iali'i-Makin	LA Giltinis	0	2
(United States) Asa Carter	Dallas Jackals	0	2
(South Africa) Tiaan Loots	San Diego Legion	0	2
(Canada) Josh Larsen	New England Free Jacks	0	2
(New Zealand) Andy Ellis	Rugby New York	0	2
(American Samoa) Joseph Mano	Utah Warriors	0	2
(Argentina) Conrado Roura	Dallas Jackals	0	1
(United States) Bronson Teles	Dallas Jackals	0	1
(Australia) Robbie Coleman	New Orleans Gold	0	1
(South Africa) Pieter Jansen	New England Free Jacks	0	1
(United States) Kellen Gordon	Seattle Seawolves	0	1
(New Zealand) Jordan Trainor	LA Giltinis	0	1
(South Africa) Carlo de Nysschen	Dallas Jackals	0	1
(United States) Malcolm May	New Orleans Gold	0	1
(United States) Dino Waldren	New Orleans Gold	0	1
(United States) Alex Tucci	Dallas Jackals	0	1
(Canada) Moe Abdelmonem	Dallas Jackals	0	1
(United States) Jamason Faʻanana-Schultz	Old Glory DC	0	1
(Fiji) Keni Nasoqeqe	Houston SaberCats	0	1
(England) Chris Robshaw	San Diego Legion	0	1
(Canada) Cole Keith	Toronto Arrows	0	1
(South Africa) Jurie van Vuuren	Utah Warriors	0	1
(Australia) Hugh Roach	Austin Gilgronis	0	1
(United States) Christian Ostberg	Austin Gilgronis	0	1
(United States) Chad London	Dallas Jackals	0	1
(United States) Samu Manoa	Seattle Seawolves	0	1
(Scotland) James Malcolm	Seattle Seawolves	0	1
(Samoa) Lui Sitama	Rugby ATL	0	1
(New Zealand) Jesse Parete	New England Free Jacks	0	1
(Tonga) Setefano Funaki	Seattle Seawolves	0	1
(Argentina) Nicolás Solveyra	Houston SaberCats	0	1
(New Zealand) Ueta Tufuga	Toronto Arrows	0	1
(Canada) Paul Ciulini	Toronto Arrows	0	1
(Canada) James O'Neill	Toronto Arrows	0	1
(England) Jack Reeves	New England Free Jacks	0	1
(South Africa) Ryan Louwrens	Austin Gilgronis	0	1
(New Zealand) Casey McDermott Vai	Austin Gilgronis	0	1
(Canada) Johnny Sheridan	Toronto Arrows	0	1
(Canada) Mike Sheppard	Toronto Arrows	0	1
(Canada) Djustice Sears-Duru	LA Giltinis	0	1
(England) Thomas Tu'avao	Utah Warriors	0	1
(South Africa) James Mocke	Utah Warriors	0	1
(United States) Tevita Tameilau	San Diego Legion	0	1
(South Africa) Jaco Bezuidenhout	Houston SaberCats	0	1
(South Africa) Frikkie de Beer	Houston SaberCats	0	1
(England) Cam Dodson	Austin Gilgronis	0	1
(United States) Siaosi Mahoni	Houston SaberCats	0	1
(United States) Emmanuel Albert	Houston SaberCats	0	1
(United States) Payton Telea-Ilalio	Austin Gilgronis	0	1
(New Zealand) Junior Sa'u	Old Glory DC	0	1
(United States) Kelly Kolberg	Dallas Jackals	0	1
(England) Ben Mitchell	San Diego Legion	0	1
(United States) Chris Baumann	San Diego Legion	0	1
(United States) Joe Taufeteʻe	LA Giltinis	0	1
(Fiji) Paula Balekana	New England Free Jacks	0	1
(South Africa) Herman Agenbag	Dallas Jackals	0	1
(United States) Tommy Madaras	Dallas Jackals	0	1
(Fiji) Tevita Naqali	Old Glory DC	0	1
(Ireland) Paddy Ryan	San Diego Legion	0	1
(United States) Matai Leuta	Houston SaberCats	0	1
(New Zealand) Jesse Parete	New England Free Jacks	0	1
(South Africa) Johan Momsen	Rugby ATL	0	1
(Argentina) Juan Pablo Zeiss	Houston SaberCats	0	1
(South Africa) Marno Redelinghuys	Houston SaberCats	0	1
(United States) Jack Iscaro	Old Glory DC	0	1
(South Africa) Rhyno Herbst	Seattle Seawolves	0	1
(Canada) Andrew Quattrin	Toronto Arrows	0	1
(New Zealand) Mills Sanerivi	New England Free Jacks	0	1
(Ireland) Fintan Coleman	Old Glory DC	0	1
(New Zealand) Felix Kalapu	Old Glory DC	0	1
(Canada) Michael Smith	San Diego Legion	0	1
(Argentina) Julián Domínguez	Austin Gilgronis	0	1
(Australia) Lachlan McCaffrey	Austin Gilgronis	0	1
(United States) Will Burke	Rugby ATL	0	1
(Samoa) AJ Alatimu	Seattle Seawolves	0	1
(England) Connor Burns	Utah Warriors	0	1
(England) Stan South	Old Glory DC	0	1
(United States) Chance Wenglewski	Rugby New York	0	1
(Namibia) Wian Conradie	New England Free Jacks	0	1
(United States) Osaiasi Tonga'uiha	New Orleans Gold	0	1
(United States) Billy Stewart	New Orleans Gold	0	1
(New Zealand) Beaudein Waaka	New England Free Jacks	0	1
(Brazil) Wilton Rebolo	Rugby New York	0	1
(Samoa) Pele Cowley	Austin Gilgronis	0	1
(United States) Luke Carty	Seattle Seawolves	0	1
(United States) Cyrille Cama	Seattle Seawolves	0	1

== End of Season Awards ==
Award	Player	Team	Position
Coach of the Year	Scott Mathie	New England Free Jacks	Head Coach
Player of the Year	Beaudein Waaka	New England Free Jacks	Fly-half
Rookie of the Year	Tavite Lopeti	Seattle Seawolves	Outside Center
Back of the Year	Bill Meakes	LA Giltinis	Center
Forward of the Year	Brendon O'Connor	Rugby New York	Flanker

The MLR introduced a new postseason award; the S. Marcus Calloway Community Impact Award, which honors the MLR player who has made a "positive impact in their community while exuding the values of the sport of rugby".

The award is named after the late S. Marcus Calloway, the former chairman and majority owner of Rugby ATL who died in December 2021. It will be awarded to the player who shows "passion, excellence and integrity on and off the field, inspires others to action, shows strength in character, aids those less fortunate, and embraces the core values of rugby, while displaying solidarity, discipline and respect". Each Major League Rugby team will nominate one player each year for the award, with a committee made up of MLR Commissioner George Killebrew, Deputy Commissioner Bill Goren and Marcus' widow Clea Calloway, selecting the winner from the 13 nominees. The winning player will be presented with a commemorative trophy and a $5,000 donation to the non-profit of their choice at the MLR Championship Final.

During the MLR Championship Final, it was announced that Andrew Quattrin of the Toronto Arrows was the recipient of the inaugural S. Marcus Calloway Community Impact Award. Quattrin was presented with a commemorative trophy and a $5,000 donation to his non-profit, Optimism Place.
