= Tuiloma =

Tuiloma is both a given name and a surname. Notable people with the name include:

- Tuiloma Neroni Slade (born 1941), Samoan politician
- Tuiloma Pule Lameko (1935–2018), Samoan politician
- Bill Tuiloma (born 1995), New Zealand footballer
- Kalolo Tuiloma (born 1990), New Zealand rugby union player
