= Jack Heighton =

New Zealand rugby union player

- Born: 26 February 1999 (age 27) New Zealand
- Height: 1.87 m (6 ft 1 1/2 in)
- Weight: 90 kg (14 st; 200 lb)

Rugby union career
- Position: Fly-half / Fullback
Senior career
Years	Team	Apps	(Points)
2020	Blues	0	(0)
2020–	North Harbour	6	(0)
2022–	Rugby New York	5	(30)
- Correct as of 19 March 2022

Jack Heighton (born 26 February 1999) is a New Zealand rugby union player, currently playing for the Rugby New York (Ironworkers) in Major League Rugby (MLR) and North Harbour in the National Provincial Championship. His preferred position is fly-half or Fullback.

== Professional career ==
Heighton signed for Major League Rugby side Rugby New York for the 2022 Major League Rugby season. He has also previously played for North Harbour, being named in the squad for the 2021 Bunnings NPC. He was also named in the Blues squad for the 2020 Super Rugby season, although he did not make an appearance.
