= Beaudein Waaka =

NZ rugby union player

- Full name: Beaudein Roger Tuhaunui Waaka
- Born: 27 January 1994 (age 32) Whakatāne, New Zealand
- Height: 180 cm (5 ft 11 in)
- Weight: 91 kg (201 lb; 14 st 5 lb)
- School: Gisborne Boys' High School
- Notable relative: Stacey Waaka (sister)

Rugby union career
- Position(s): Fullback, centre, first five-eighth
Senior career
Years	Team	Apps	(Points)
2012, 2019	Poverty Bay	5	(61)
2013–2018	Taranaki	30	(111)
2019–2020	Manly	17	(106)
2020–2023	New England Free Jacks	38	(271)
2020–2021	Waikato	13	(35)
2023	Kobelco Steelers	6	(13)
2023	Manawatu	9	(7)
2023–2025	Skyactivs Hiroshima	15	(78)
2026	USRC Tigers RFC		
- Correct as of 10 December 2023
National sevens team
Years	Team		Comps
2015–2017	New Zealand		14
- Correct as of 25 January 2020

Beaudein Waaka (born 27 January 1994) is a New Zealand rugby union player who currently plays for Manawatu in New Zealand's domestic National Provincial Championship and for Skyactivs Hiroshima in the Japan Rugby League One competition. He previously played for Taranaki, New England Free Jacks, Waikato and Kobelco Kobe Steelers.

== Professional career ==
In 2012, Waaka played for Poverty Bay in the Heartland Championship. Then he represented the Taranaki Bulls for five seasons in the Mitre 10 Cup competition.

In 2019, he signed with Manly RUFC. Like his sister, Stacey Waaka, he has represented New Zealand in rugby sevens.

In 2020, Waaka signed with the New England Free Jacks. He made two appearances during the shorted 2020 season. The following year during the 2021 season Waaka appeared in 15 matches for the free jacks scoring 103 points. He would then finish the year with Waikato, and helped them win the Bunnings NPC Premiership Division championship.

He then returned to the free jacks for the 2022 season. Where he had a career year, finishing third in goal kicks and second in point scorers, with 151. This led to him being named the MLR player of the year for the 2022 season. Being the first player in Free Jacks history to receive the honor. He also won the MLR championship shield with the Free Jacks in 2023. Throughout his tenure in New England Waaka became a fan favorite among free jacks fans.

After the 2023 season, Waaka left the Free Jacks and signed with Skyactivs Hiroshima to play in Japan. In his first year with the team, he appeared in 12 matches for the club, scoring 72 points. However, the following year, he was injured, only appearing in the final game of the 2024-25 season.

In November 2026, Waaka joined prestigious USRC Tigers RFC in the Hong Kong Premiership.

== Honours ==
New England Free Jacks

- Major League Rugby Championship (2023)
- Major league Rugby player of the year (2022)
- All Major League Rugby first team (2022)

Waikato

- Bunnings NPC Premiership Division championship (2021)

Skyactivs Hiroshima

- Japan Rugby League One division 3 championship (2025)
