= William Talataina =

Samoa rugby union player

- Born: William Talataina-Mu; 5 August 1995 (age 31) New Zealand
- Height: 1.89 m (6 ft 2 1/2 in)
- Weight: 103 kg (16.2 st; 227 lb)

Rugby union career
- Position: Centre
Senior career
Years	Team	Apps	(Points)
2017	Southland	5	(0)
2020	Auckland	2	(0)
2022–	Old Glory DC	45	(124)
- Correct as of 8 October 2024
International career
Years	Team	Apps	(Points)
2014	Samoa U20	3	(0)
- Correct as of 19 March 2022

William Talataina (born 5 August 1995) is a rugby union player, currently playing for the Old Glory DC of Major League Rugby (MLR). His preferred position is centre.

== Professional career ==
Talataina signed for Major League Rugby side Old Glory DC for the 2022 Major League Rugby season. He has also previously played for Southland and Auckland.
