= Mills Sanerivi =

New Zealand rugby union player

- Born: Millennium Sanerivi; 31 August 1999 (age 27) New Zealand
- Height: 1.81 m (5 ft 11 1/2 in)
- Weight: 113 kg (17.8 st; 249 lb)

Rugby union career
- Position(s): Hooker, Flanker
Senior career
Years	Team	Apps	(Points)
2021–2023	Taranaki	19	(0)
2022–2023	New England Free Jacks	31	(40)
2024	Chiefs	1	(0)
2024	Auckland	7	(10)
- Correct as of 5 November 2024

Mills Sanerivi (born 31 August 1999) is a New Zealand rugby union player, who currently playing as a hooker for Auckland in the National Provincial Championship.

== Professional career ==
Sanerivi signed for Major League Rugby side New England Free Jacks for the 2022 Major League Rugby season. He has also previously played for Taranaki, making his debut in the 2021 Bunnings NPC.
