= Rohan Saifoloi =

Australian rugby union player

- Born: 20 November 1991 (age 34) Samoa
- Height: 1.75 m (5 ft 9 in)
- Weight: 85 kg (187 lb; 13 st 5 lb)

Rugby union career
- Position: Fly-half
Senior career
Years	Team	Apps	(Points)
2014	Tasman	2	(11)
2015	Greater Sydney Rams	8	(6)
2017	Sydney	7	(39)
2018	NSW Country Eagles	5	(13)
2019	Queensland Country	6	(62)
2022–	Old Glory DC	7	(30)
- Correct as of 28 April 2022
International career
Years	Team	Apps	(Points)
2011	Australia U20	5	(0)
- Correct as of 19 March 2022

Rohan Saifoloi (born 20 November 1991) is an Australian rugby union player, currently playing for the Old Glory DC of Major League Rugby (MLR). His preferred position is fly-half.

== Professional career ==
Saifoloi signed for Major League Rugby side Old Glory DC for the 2022 Major League Rugby season. He has also previously played for Tasman, Greater Sydney Rams, Sydney, NSW Country Eagles and most recently from Queensland Country in the 2019 National Rugby Championship.
