= Peni Lasaqa =

Fijian rugby union player

- Born: Peni Lasaqa Fiji
- Height: 172 cm (5 ft 8 in)
- Weight: 82 kg (181 lb; 12 st 13 lb)
- University: Saint Kentigern College
- Occupation: Rugby union player

Rugby union career
- Position: Winger
- Current team: Old Glory DC
Youth career
- 2018: NZ Barbarians
- 2019: Sevens
- 2020: Under-20s
Senior career
Years	Team	Apps	(Points)
2019	Bay of Plenty		
2022–present	Old Glory DC		(45)

Peni Lasaqa (born 2000) is a Fijian-Australian rugby union player who currently plays for Old Glory DC in Major League Rugby (MLR) in the U.S.

== Early life ==
Lasaqa grew up in Tauranga, New Zealand.

== Career ==
Beginning in the professional leagues with the Bay of Plenty in 2021, Lasaqa was drafted by Old Glory DC starting in the 2022 MLR season. His contract was renewed for the 2023 season.
