= Andrew Coe =

Canadian rugby union player

- Full name: Andrew Jordon Ditka Coe
- Born: 8 April 1996 (age 30) Elms, British Columbia
- Height: 1.87 m (6 ft 2 in)
- Weight: 93 kg (205 lb)
- University: University of British Columbia
- Occupation: Rugby union player

Rugby union career
- Position(s): Wing, Fullback
- Current team: Rugby New York
Youth career
- Markham Irish
Senior career
| Years | Team | Apps | (Points) |
| 2022– | Rugby New York | 17 | (30) |
- Correct as of 6 March 2023
International career
| Years | Team | Apps | (Points) |
| 2017– | Canada | 16 | (15) |
- Correct as of 14 December 2022

Andrew Jordon Ditka Coe (born 8 April 1996) is a Canadian rugby union player who generally plays as a fullback representing Canada internationally. He also plays for Rugby New York (Ironworkers) in Major League Rugby (MLR). His nickname is "Cozy Bones".

He was included in the Canadian squad for the 2019 Rugby World Cup which is held in Japan for the first time and also marks his first World Cup appearance.

== Career ==
He made his international debut for Canada against Georgia on 10 June 2017. He was also part of the Canada rugby sevens team which took part at the 2018 Commonwealth Games. He made his first World Cup match appearance against Italy on 26 September 2019 and also scored a try in a losing cause for Canada, where Italy thrashed them in a one sided match by scoring 48–7.

In June 2021, Coe was named to Canada's 2020 Summer Olympics sevens team.

=== Club statistics ===
As of 14 December 2022

| Season | Team | Games | Starts | Sub | Tries | Cons | Pens | Drops | Points | Yel | Red |
|---|---|---|---|---|---|---|---|---|---|---|---|
| MLR 2022 | Rugby New York | 17 | 15 | 2 | 6 | 0 | 0 | 0 | 30 | 0 | 0 |
| Total | | 17 | 15 | 2 | 6 | 0 | 0 | 0 | 30 | 0 | 0 |
