= Michael Smith (rugby union) =

Canadian rugby union player

- Born: 16 March 1998 (age 28) Canada
- Height: 1.90 m (6 ft 3 in)
- Weight: 98 kg (15.4 st; 216 lb)

Rugby union career
- Position: Flanker
Senior career
Years	Team	Apps	(Points)
2021–	San Diego Legion	8	(0)
- Correct as of 3 July 2021
International career
Years	Team	Apps	(Points)
2018	Canada U20	4	(10)
2021–	Canada	4	(0)
- Correct as of 5 February 2022

Michael Smith (born 16 March 1998) is a Canadian rugby union player, currently playing for the San Diego Legion of Major League Rugby (MLR) and the Canadian national team. His preferred position is flanker.

== Professional career ==
Smith signed for Major League Rugby side San Diego Legion for the 2021 Major League Rugby season. Smith made his debut for Canada in the 2021 July rugby union tests.

== Career statistics ==
As of 9 February 2022

Season	Team	Games	Starts	Sub	Tries	Cons	Pens	Drops	Points	Yel	Red
MLR 2021	San Diego Legion	8	4	4	0	0	0	0	0	0	0
MLR 2022	San Diego Legion	1	1	0	0	0	0	0	0	0	0
Total		9	5	4	0	0	0	0	0	0	0
