= Ed Fidow =

Samoa international rugby union player

- Full name: Teofilo Fidow
- Born: 11 September 1993 (age 33) Motoʻotua, Samoa
- Height: 1.88 m (6 ft 2 in)
- Weight: 100 kg (220 lb; 15 st 10 lb)
- School: Southern Cross Campus

Rugby union career
- Position: Wing
- Current team: Nola Gold Rugby
Senior career
Years	Team	Apps	(Points)
2017	Brisbane City	7	(45)
2017–2018	Bordeaux Bègles	11	(15)
2018–2019	Provence	14	(35)
2019–2021	Worcester Warriors	7	(10)
2021–2022	Manawatu	17	(30)
2022–	New York	28	(80)
2023 - current	Nola Gold Rugby	7	(25)
- Correct as of 28 August 2023
International career
Years	Team	Apps	(Points)
2018–2023	Samoa	19	(60)
- Correct as of 28 August 2023
National sevens team
Years	Team		Comps
2015–2017	Samoa		10
- Correct as of 28 August 2023

Teofilio Fidow (born 11 September 1993) is a Samoan professional rugby union player who plays as a wing for Major League Rugby club New York and the Samoa national team.

== Club career ==
Fidow began his career in New Zealand with the Papatoetoe RFC in the Auckland Gallagher Shield competition, Earning selection for the Auckland Sevens squad.

In 2017, Fidow moved to Australia to play with Wests Rugby in the Queensland Premier Rugby Competition Fidow was spotted by Brad Thorn and selected for Brisbane City for the 2017 National Rugby Championship.

Later on in 2017, Fidow was selected as a medical joker for Bordeaux-Begles in the French top 14 season, staying until the end of the season.

Following on from his Samoan selection, the newly promoted Provence rugby contracted him for the 2018-19 Pro D2 competition.

Fidow has signed with Worcester Warriors for the 2019-2021 Premiership rugby seasons.

== International career ==
In 2015, Fidow was selected for the Samoa rugby sevens team as part of the World Rugby Sevens Series. He played two seasons with Samoa Sevens, scoring 21 tries in 46 Appearances.

In May 2018, Fidow was selected for the Samoan national team for the first time to play in the Pacific Nations Cup.

Fidow was selected for the Samoan team for the 2019 Rugby World Cup.
