= Christian Ostberg =

American rugby union player

- Born: 19 July 1994 (age 32) United States
- Height: 1.97 m (6 ft 5 1/2 in)
- Weight: 114 kg (251 lb; 17 st 13 lb)

Rugby union career
- Position(s): Lock, Blindside flanker
Senior career
Years	Team	Apps	(Points)
2016–2020	Aurillac	19	(0)
2021–2022	Austin Gilgronis	20	(5)
2023-	American Raptors		
- Correct as of 30 January 2021
International career
Years	Team	Apps	(Points)
2013	United States U20s	5	(0)
2016	USA Selects	5	(0)
- Correct as of 30 January 2021

Christian Ostberg (born 19 July 1994) is an American rugby union player, currently playing for the Austin Gilgronis of Major League Rugby (MLR). His preferred position is lock.

== Professional career ==
Ostberg signed for Major League Rugby side Austin Gilgronis ahead of the 2021 Major League Rugby season. He had previously spent four seasons at Pro D2 side Aurillac.
