= Mike Dabulas =

United States rugby union player

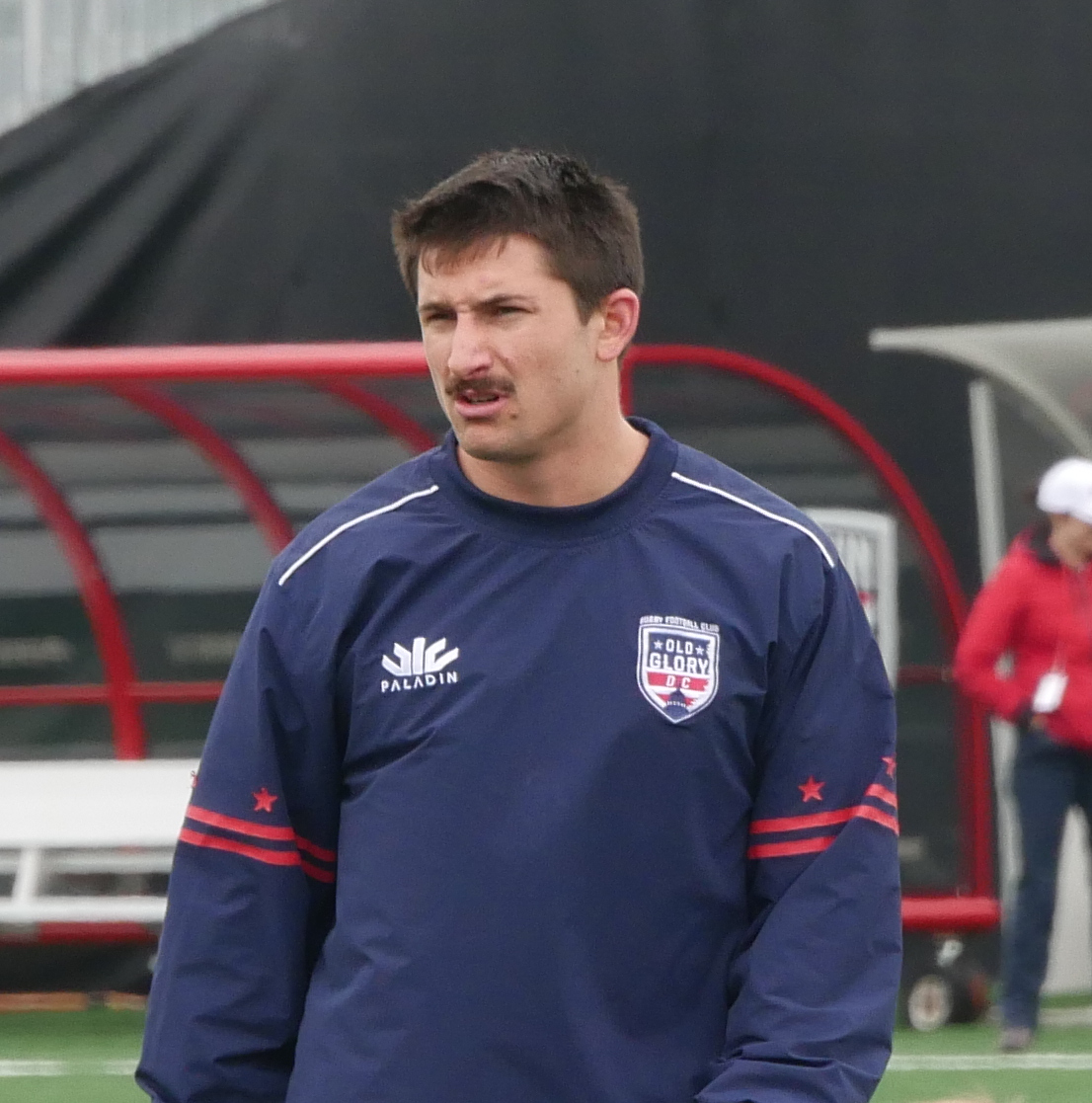
- Mike Dabulas with Old Glory DC
- Born: December 13, 1996 (age 29) Westfield, New Jersey, United States
- Height: 1.80 m (5 ft 11 in)
- Weight: 85 kg (13.4 st; 187 lb)

Rugby union career
- Position: Fly-half / Fullback
Senior career
Years	Team	Apps	(Points)
2020–	Old Glory DC	23	(32)
- Correct as of 28 April 2022
International career
Years	Team	Apps	(Points)
2021–	United States	1	(0)
- Correct as of 13 September 2021

Mike Dabulas (born December 13, 1996) is a United States rugby union player, currently playing for the Old Glory DC of Major League Rugby (MLR) and the United States national team. His preferred position is fly-half or fullback.

== Professional career ==
Dabulas signed for Major League Rugby side Old Glory DC for the 2021 Major League Rugby season, having also played for the side in 2020.

Dabulas debuted for United States against Canada during the 2023 Rugby World Cup – Americas qualification.
