= Matías Freyre =

Argentinian rugby union player (born 1994)

- Born: 19 August 1994 (age 32) Bakersfield, United States
- Height: 6 ft 1 in (1.85 m)
- Weight: 190 lb (86 kg)

Rugby union career
- Position(s): Fullback, Centre, Winger
Amateur team(s)
Years	Team	Apps	(Points)
2015-2019	Club Newman	71	(87)
Senior career
Years	Team	Apps	(Points)
2020–2021	Houston Sabercats	9	(10)
2022	San Diego Legion		
National sevens team
Years	Team		Comps
2017	Argentina		2

Matías Freyre (born 19 August 1994) is an American born Argentinian professional rugby union player. He plays as a utility back for the San Diego Legion in Major League Rugby (MLR). He previously played for the Houston SaberCats.

He previously played for Argentina in the World Rugby Sevens Series.
