= Joe Pietersen =

South African rugby union player

- Full name: Johan Christiaan Pietersen
- Born: 18 May 1984 (age 42) Vryheid, South Africa
- Height: 1.78 m (5 ft 10 in)
- Weight: 81 kg (12 st 11 lb; 179 lb)
- School: Grey College, Bloemfontein
- University: Stellenbosch University

Rugby union career
- Position: Fullback / Wing / Flyhalf
- Current team: Retired
Youth career
- 2003–2004: Western Province
Senior career
Years	Team	Apps	(Points)
2004–2010	Western Province	57	(360)
2006–2010	Stormers	21	(106)
2010–2011	Bayonne	29	(45)
2012–2013	Western Province	8	(37)
2012–2013	Stormers	29	(267)
2013–2014	Biarritz	17	(40)
2015	Cheetahs	11	(92)
2015	Sharks (Currie Cup)	10	(126)
2016	Sharks	9	(72)
2016–2018	Kamaishi Seawaves	15	(132)
2018–2022	San Diego Legion	26	(254)
- Correct as of 8 June 2021
International career
Years	Team	Apps	(Points)
2004	Blitzbokke	2	
- Correct as of 8 June 2021

Johan Christiaan Pietersen (born 18 May 1984) is a South African former rugby union player who also played as the fly-half for the San Diego Legion of Major League Rugby (MLR).

== Professional career ==
He started his career at Western Province, playing for them in the domestic Currie Cup and Vodacom Cup competitions, as well as representing the Stormers in Super Rugby. In 2010, he joined Bayonne in France, but on 4 Nov 2011, he rejoined Western Province on a 2-year deal.

After a second spell in France with Biarritz, he returned to South Africa to join Bloemfontein-based side the Free State Cheetahs in 2014. After just six months, he moved to Durban to join the Sharks.

He joined Japanese side Kamaishi Seawaves prior to the 2016–2017 Top East League season.
