= Dean Muir =

South African rugby union player

- Full name: Dean Muir
- Born: 6 February 1989 (age 37) Durban, South Africa
- Height: 1.81 m (5 ft 11 1/2 in)
- Weight: 108 kg (17 st 0 lb; 238 lb)
- School: Glenwood High School
- University: University of South Africa

Rugby union career
- Position: Hooker
- Current team: Houston SaberCats
Youth career
- 2006–2008: Sharks
Amateur team(s)
Years	Team	Apps	(Points)
2010	TUT Vikings	6	(0)
2014	UKZN Impi	10	(5)
Senior career
Years	Team	Apps	(Points)
2012–2013	Border Bulldogs	31	(20)
2014–2016	Falcons	39	(20)
2017–2018	Western Province	18	(20)
2018	Stormers	6	(0)
2018	Kintetsu Liners	1	(0)
2019–2021	San Diego Legion	33	(40)
2022–	Houston SaberCats	24	(70)
- Correct as of 26 June 2023

Dean Muir (born 6 February 1989) is a South African rugby union player currently playing hooker position for the Houston SaberCats in Major League Rugby (MLR) where he is team captain. He previously played for the San Diego Legion of the MLR.

== Career ==
He represented the Sharks at the 2006 and 2007 Under–18 Craven Week tournaments and played for the Sharks' Under–19 team the following season.

In 2010, he played for the TUT Vikings in the 2010 Varsity Cup.

He returned to the Sharks and was included in their squad for the 2012 Vodacom Cup. He was named on the bench for the game against the Boland Cavaliers, but failed to make an appearance.

In the second half of 2012, he joined the Border Bulldogs, where he made his debut in the opening game of the 2012 Currie Cup First Division season against the SWD Eagles and became a regular starter for the team.
