= Calvin Whiting =

US international rugby union player (b. 1995)

- Born: November 30, 1995 (age 30) Johannesburg, South Africa
- Height: 6 ft 1 in (1.85 m)
- Weight: 207 lb (94 kg)
- School: Lone Peak High School
- University: Brigham Young University

Rugby union career
- Position: Center
- Current team: Utah Warriors
Amateur team(s)
Years	Team	Apps	(Points)
- United Rugby Club
2015–2019	BYU		
- Correct as of April 23, 2019
Senior career
Years	Team	Apps	(Points)
2019–present	Utah Warriors	17	(32)
- Correct as of June 9, 2021
International career
Years	Team	Apps	(Points)
- United States U19
2017–present	United States	3	(5)
- Correct as of July 10, 2021

Calvin Whiting (born November 30, 1995) is a South African-born American rugby union player who plays at center for the Utah Warriors in Major League Rugby (MLR). He also represents the USA playing for the United States men's national team.

Whiting has also represented the United States playing at age-grade level.

== Early life ==
Whiting was born on November 30, 1995, in Johannesburg, South Africa. Whiting moved to Utah in 2011 and attended Lone Peak High School in Highland, Utah. Whiting began attending Brigham Young University in 2015, where he has studied business management and played for the school's rugby team.

== Club career ==
Whiting signed with Major League Rugby's Utah Warriors in early 2019 for the 2019 Major League Rugby season.

== International career ==
=== USA High School All-Americans ===
Whiting was named to the United States national under-19 rugby union team (High School All-Americans) three times and served as a team captain.

=== USA Eagles ===
Whiting was first named to the roster for the USA Eagles ahead of the 2017 Americas Rugby Championship. Whiting made his debut for the Eagles on February 25, 2017, appearing as a substitute, in a 57–9 victory against Chile. Whiting also played for the Eagles on March 4, 2017, appearing as a substitute, in an uncapped match against Argentina XV.
