= Chad Gough =

United States rugby union player

- Born: 17 October 1991 (age 35) United States
- Height: 1.83 m (6 ft 0 in)
- Weight: 105 kg (231 lb; 16.5 st)

Rugby union career
- Position: Hooker
Senior career
Years	Team	Apps	(Points)
2019–2020	Colorado Raptors	21	(20)
2021–	Utah Warriors	9	(10)
- Correct as of 24 October 2021
International career
Years	Team	Apps	(Points)
2021–	United States	1	(0)
- Correct as of 24 October 2021

Chad Gough (born 17 October 1991) is a United States rugby union player, currently playing for the Utah Warriors of Major League Rugby (MLR) and the United States national team. His preferred position is hooker.

== Professional career ==
Gough signed for Major League Rugby side Utah Warriors for the 2021 Major League Rugby season, having represented the now defunct Colorado Raptors during the 2019 and 2020 season.

Gough debuted for United States against New Zealand during the 2021 end-of-year rugby union internationals.
