= Louritz van der Schyff =

South African rugby union player

- Full name: Louritz van der Schyff
- Born: South Africa
- Height: 1.90 m (6 ft 3 in)
- Weight: 103 kg (227 lb)
- School: Afrikaanse Hoër Seunskool

Rugby union career
- Position: Centre
- Current team: Houston SaberCats
Senior career
Years	Team	Apps	(Points)
2019–2020	Lions	0	(0)
2021	Blue Bulls	1	(0)
2022–	Houston SaberCats	21	(60)
- Correct as of 13 January 2022

Louritz van der Schyff is a South African rugby union player for the Blue Bulls in the Currie Cup. He also plays for the Houston SaberCats in Major League Rugby (MLR). His regular position is centre.

Van der Schyff was named in the Blue Bulls squad for the 2021 Currie Cup Premier Division. He made his debut in Round 1 of the 2021 Currie Cup Premier Division against the Western Province.
