= Will Tucker =

New Zealand rugby union player

- Full name: William A. Tucker
- Born: 16 March 1998 (age 28) New Zealand
- Height: 2.02 m (6 ft 8 in)
- Weight: 111 kg (17 st 7 lb; 245 lb)
- School: St Bede's College
- Notable relative(s): Brad Tucker, James Tucker (brothers)

Rugby union career
- Position: Lock
- Current team: AZ-COM Maruwa MOMOTARO’S
Senior career
| Years | Team | Apps | (Points) |
| 2018–2019 | Canterbury | 4 | (0) |
| 2020–2022 | Rugby New York | 15 | (20) |
| 2020–2025 | Otago | 51 | (25) |
| 2023–2024 | Highlanders | 11 | (0) |
| 2025 | Hurricanes | 7 | (0) |
| 2025– | AZ-COM Maruwa MOMOTARO’S | 6 | (5) |
| 2026 | Crusaders | 2 | (0) |
- Correct as of 13 November 2024
International career
| Years | Team | Apps | (Points) |
| 2018 | New Zealand U20 | 5 | (10) |
- Correct as of 13 November 2024

Will Tucker (born 16 March 1998) is a New Zealand rugby union player, who currently plays as a lock for Otago in New Zealand's domestic National Provincial Championship competition and the Hurricanes in Super Rugby. He previously played for the Highlanders as well as for Rugby New York in Major League Rugby.
