= Federico Anselmi =

Argentine rugby union referee

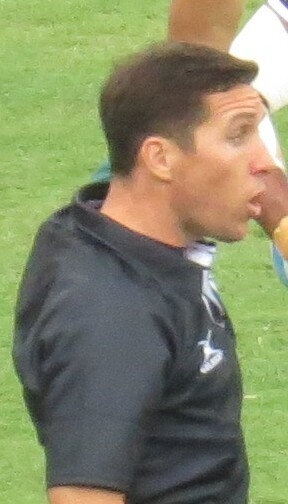
- Born: Federico Anselmi; 29 August 1982 (age 44) Mendoza, Argentina
- University: University of Buenos Aires
- Occupation: Human Resources Manager

Rugby union career
Refereeing career
Years	Competition	Apps
2009–present	Sevens World Series	
2012–present	Test matches	
2013	Rugby World Cup Sevens	
2015	2015 Rugby World Cup	
2016-present	Super Rugby	

Federico Anselmi (born 29 August 1982) is a rugby union referee who represents the Argentine Rugby Union (UAR). He also is a referee for Major League Rugby in North America.

== Refereeing career ==
Anselmi is a referee on the Sevens World Series circuit, haven made his debut during the 2009 Dubai Sevens - 2009–10 IRB Sevens World Series. He is a referee on the seven circuit and was rewarded with a place on the 2013 Rugby World Cup Sevens referee panel. Since 2010 he has tried to develop into a world class 15's referee but couldn't, and on 27 October 2012 he made his 15's debut, refereeing the Round 2 final of the Americas 2015 Rugby World Cup qualification between Brazil and Paraguay. He has since gone on to referee more competitive matches, most notable the Canada vs Māori All Blacks match on 3 November 2013. In June 2014, he was on the referring panel for the 2014 IRB Junior World Championship, where he refereed 4 matches, 2 of which came in the knock-out stages; South Africa U20 vs New Zealand U20 semi-final, and France U20 vs Australia U20 5th place game.

In 2015, he was an assistant referee for 2 matches in the 2015 Six Nations Championship; Wales vs Ireland and one of the deciding matches in the final round, Scotland vs Ireland. On 1 May 2015, he made his first appearance in the Super Rugby, been an assistant referee for the Brumbies–Waratahs match. Not only did this give him experience at XV level, but it gave an Argentine referee experience in the competition ahead of an Argentine club joining it the following year, 2016.

In September 2015, he went to the 2015 Rugby World Cup as an assistant referee and as the most inexperienced referee on the panel, with only 5 XV matches refereed to his name.

He joined the Super Rugby referees panel for the 2016 season and remains on the team for 2017.
