= Jaco Bezuidenhout =

South African rugby union player

- Full name: Hendrik Willem Jacobus Bezuidenhout
- Born: 5 January 1997 (age 29) Pretoria, South Africa
- Height: 1.91 m (6 ft 3 in)
- Weight: 101 kg (223 lb)
- School: Hoërskool Garsfontein
- University: University of Pretoria

Rugby union career
- Position: Flanker
- Current team: Houston SaberCats
Senior career
Years	Team	Apps	(Points)
2018	Blue Bulls XV	1	(5)
2021	Blue Bulls	1	(0)
2022–	Houston SaberCats		
- Correct as of 13 January 2022

Jaco Bezuidenhout (born 5 January 1997) is a South African rugby union player for the Blue Bulls in the Currie Cup. His regular position is flanker.

Bezuidenhout was named in the Blue Bulls squad for the 2021 Currie Cup Premier Division. He made his debut in Round 1 of the 2021 Currie Cup Premier Division against the Western Province.

== Honours ==
New England Free Jacks

- Major League Rugby Championship: 2024
