= Tevita Naqali =

Fijian rugby union player (born 1996)

- Born: 21 June 1996 (age 30) Nadroga, Fiji
- Height: 6 ft 6 in (1.98 m)
- Weight: 255 lb (116 kg)

Rugby union career
- Position: Lock
Amateur team(s)
Years	Team	Apps	(Points)
- Suva Provincial R.C.
Senior career
Years	Team	Apps	(Points)
2018	Fijian Drua	8	(5)
2019	Valladolid RAC	6	(0)
2019	Fijian Latui	3	(0)
2019	Fijian Drua	8	(0)
2020-present	Old Glory DC	25	(15)
International career
Years	Team	Apps	(Points)
2025–	United States	9	

Tevita Naqali (born 1996) is a professional rugby union player who plays as a lock for Old Glory DC in Major League Rugby (MLR).

He previously played for Fijian Drua in the Australian National Rugby Championship, Fijian Latui in Global Rapid Rugby and Valladolid RAC in the División de Honor de Rugby.

He has played internationally for the United States national rugby union team since 2025, after having qualified on residency grounds.
