= Will Kelly (rugby union) =

Canadian rugby union player (born 1997)

- Born: William Kelly; 5 August 1997 (age 29) Wales
- Height: 6 ft 4 in (1.93 m)
- Weight: 205 lb (93 kg; 14 st 9 lb)
- University: McMaster University

Rugby union career
- Position: Fly-Half
- Current team: Toronto Arrows
Senior career
Years	Team	Apps	(Points)
2019	Dragons		
2020	Toronto Arrows	2	
- Correct as of 26 February 2020
International career
Years	Team	Apps	(Points)
2017–2018	Canada U20	4	(20)
2019–	Canada	1	(0)
- Correct as of 11 February 2020

Will Kelly (born 5 August 1997) is a Canadian rugby union player who plays for Canadian team the Toronto Arrows of Major League Rugby (MLR) as a fly-half.

Kelly made his debut for the Canadian national side in 2019, whilst he was playing in Wales for the Dragons academy, Cross Keys and the Dragons U23 side. Although born in Wales, Kelly grew up in Canada.

On 6 September 2019 Kelly signed with the Toronto Arrows of Major League Rugby.
