= JP Smith (rugby union, born 1994) =

US international rugby union player

- Full name: Juan-Philip Smith
- Born: 30 March 1994 (age 32) Bloemhof, South Africa
- Height: 1.87 m (6 ft 1 1/2 in)
- Weight: 93 kg (205 lb; 14 st 9 lb)
- School: Queen's College, Queenstown
- University: University of Pretoria

Rugby union career
- Position: Scrum-half / Fly-half
- Current team: Seattle Seawolves
Youth career
- 2010–2011: Border Bulldogs
- 2013–2015: Blue Bulls
Amateur team(s)
Years	Team	Apps	(Points)
2015	UP Tuks	0	(0)
Senior career
Years	Team	Apps	(Points)
2015	Blue Bulls	4	(0)
2016–2017	Free State XV	20	(8)
2017	Free State Cheetahs	6	(2)
2018	Southern Kings	2	(0)
2018	Eastern Province Elephants	8	(10)
2019–	Seattle Seawolves	100	(40)
- Correct as of 25 February 2021
International career
Years	Team	Apps	(Points)
2014	South Africa U20	5	(0)
2024	United States		
- Correct as of 22 April 2018

JP Smith (born 30 March 1994) is a professional rugby union player who plays for the Seattle Seawolves in Major League Rugby (MLR) in the United States. He was born and raised in South Africa, but then moved to the United States and has played for the United States national rugby union team. His regular position is scrum-half, but he has played as a fly-half on occasion.

== Club career ==
=== Border (2010–11) ===
At high school level, Smith earned provincial selection to represent Border. He played for them at the 2010 Under-16 Grant Khomo Week in Upington and the 2011 Under-18 Craven Week – South Africa's premier high school competition – in Kimberley. He was also eligible to play at the 2012 Craven Week, but was not picked as he had agreed to join the Pretoria-based Blue Bulls and fell foul of a newly adopted Border Rugby Football Union policy of not picking players for their Craven Week squad that already signed contracts with other unions.

=== Blue Bulls (2013–15) ===
He started in twelve matches for the Blue Bulls U19 side in the 2013 Under-19 Provincial Championship, including three matches as a fly-half. He scored a total of 31 points during the season, including 14 points in their match against Western Province U19, which also saw Smith score his only try of the competition. The Blue Bulls won all twelve of their matches during the regular season to finish top of the log and to quality for the title play-offs. Smith started in their 37–21 victory over the Leopards U19s in the semi-final and in the final, where he helped his side become champions by beating Gauteng rivals Golden Lions U19 35–23.

In 2014, he was included in the Blue Bulls' squad for the 2014 Vodacom Cup competition.

Smith returned to domestic action with the Blue Bulls U21s in the 2014 Under-21 Provincial Championship. He started six of their matches in the competition and appeared as a replacement in four more. He also scored one of the Blue Bulls' 21 tries in their 143–0 victory over Border U21 on the opening day of the season and eventually helped them to finish the regular season in second position. He started their 23–19 victory over the Golden Lions U21s in the semi-final, but did not feature in the final, where the Blue Bulls beat Western Province U21 20–10 to be crowned champions.

He was again named in the Blue Bulls' squad for the 2015 Vodacom Cup. After being an unused replacement in their 20–18 victory over eventual champions the Pumas, he made his domestic first class debut in their next match, a 44–0 victory over Namibian side Welwitschias in Windhoek. After his first appearance on domestic soil against the Griffons a week later, he made his first start in their quarter final match against a Free State XV, helping the Blue Bulls to a 44–21 victory. He also started in their semi-final match against Western Province, but ended on the losing side as the team from Cape Town ran out 10–6 winners.

He featured in nine of the Blue Bulls U21s' matches in the 2015 Under-21 Provincial Championship. He scored a try in their 41–31 victory over the Leopards, but experience a poor season overall as the defending champions finished in fifth spot on the log to fail to qualify for the play-offs.

=== Cheetahs (2016–2017) ===
Smith was named in the training squad of Bloemfontein-based Super Rugby franchise the Cheetahs for the 2016 Super Rugby season.

=== Seattle Seawolves (2019–present) ===
Smith began play for the Seattle Seawolves in Major League Rugby in the United States in 2019.

== International career ==
=== South Africa under-20 ===
Smith was included in the South Africa Under-20 squad that participated at the IRB Junior World Championship held in New Zealand. He played off the bench in their first match as South Africa beat Scotland 61–5, and started their other two matches in the pool stage, a 33–24 win over hosts New Zealand and a 21–8 win over Samoa to finish top of their pool. He started their semi-final match as they again met New Zealand in the semi-finals and beat them, this time by a 32–25 scoreline, to qualify to their second final. He remained the starting scrum-half for the final, but was on the losing side as England won the match 21–20 to consign South Africa to the runner-up spot.

=== United States ===
Smith plays for the United States national rugby union team. He debuted for the U.S. in July 2024 against Romania.
