= Riekert Hattingh =

United States rugby union player

- Born: 5 March 1994 (age 32) Pretoria, South Africa
- Height: 1.95 m (6 ft 5 in)
- Weight: 100 kg (16 st; 220 lb)
- Notable relative: Drikus Hattingh (father)

Rugby union career
- Position: Flanker / Number 8
Senior career
Years	Team	Apps	(Points)
2016	Ohio Aviators	6	(20)
2018–	Seattle Seawolves	80	(218)
- Correct as of 4 July 2021
International career
Years	Team	Apps	(Points)
2021–	United States	2	(0)
- Correct as of 10 July 2021

Riekert Hattingh (born 5 March 1994) is a South African born American professional rugby union player, currently playing for the Seattle Seawolves of Major League Rugby (MLR) and the United States national team. His preferred position is flanker or number 8.

== Professional career ==
Hattingh signed for Major League Rugby side Seattle Seawolves for the 2021 Major League Rugby season, having represented the side since 2018. Hattingh made his debut for United States against England during the 2021 July rugby union tests.
