= Kalolo Tuiloma =

Samoan rugby union player

- Born: 24 June 1990 (age 36) Wellington, New Zealand
- Height: 1.95 m (6 ft 5 in)
- Weight: 138 kg (21 st 10 lb; 304 lb)
- School: Aorere College; Timaru Boys' High School

Rugby union career
- Position: Tighthead prop
Senior career
Years	Team	Apps	(Points)
2016–2018, 2021	Counties Manukau	27	(40)
2018	Highlanders	10	(0)
2020	Utah Warriors	5	(10)
2020	Northland	9	(0)
2022	Rugby New York	15	(25)
2022	North Harbour	5	(5)
- Correct as of 12 August 2023
International career
Years	Team	Apps	(Points)
2021	Samoa	4	(10)
- Correct as of 12 August 2023

Kalolo E. Tuiloma (born 24 June 1990) is a New Zealand born Samoan rugby union player. His position is Tighthead prop.

== Early career ==
Born in Wellington, but raised in the suburbs of Auckland, Tuiloma originally played in the number eight position for Aorere College before heading south to complete his schooling at Timaru Boys' High School where he played in the 1st XV. After school, he played Heartland Championship rugby with South Canterbury in 2013, however soon after his career went on a downward spiral. Unable to crack the Canterbury ITM Cup team, he turned to food and alcohol and saw his weight balloon to 181 kg.

Seeking help he moved back to the Auckland area to be closer to his family and joined the Bombay Rugby club who were at the time coached by Darryl Suasua. Suasua saw Tuiloma's potential to be a prop forward and began converting him from a loose forward to a front rower. While at Bombay, he helped them to win the McNamara Cup, Counties Manukau's Premier club competition in both 2014 and 2015.

== Senior career ==
Tuiloma was first named in the Counties Manukau Steelers squad ahead of the 2016 Mitre 10 Cup where he again linked up with former Bombay coach Darryl Suasua, who was now in charge of the Steelers. Preseason injuries to experienced front row pair Pauliasi Manu and Nepo Laulala opened the door for Tuiloma, who quickly cemented himself as a regular starter in the number 3 jersey. He played all 11 of Counties Manukau's games during the campaign and scored 4 tries, including a memorable hattrick against Waikato as the Steelers reached the Premiership semi finals before going down to Canterbury.

In October 2016, it was announced that Tuiloma would take up a 7-month contract with French side Grenoble where he would serve as an injury replacement until the end of the 2016–17 season.

In December 2021 he signed a deal to return to Major League Rugby with Rugby New York for the 2022 Major League Rugby season.
