= 2014 IRB Junior World Championship =

Tournament details
- Host: New Zealand
- Date: 2–20 June 2014
- Teams: 12

Final positions
- Champions: England
- Runner-up: South Africa
- Third place: New Zealand

Tournament statistics
- Matches played: 30

The 2014 IRB Junior World Championship was the seventh annual international rugby union competition for Under 20 national teams. The event was organised in Auckland, New Zealand by rugby's governing body, World Rugby, then known as the International Rugby Board. (Note: The IRB became World Rugby on 19 November 2014.) A total of 12 nations took part in the tournament. England went into the tournament as defending champions, after winning the tournament for the first time in 2013. England went on to win the Championship for a second time in two years. While hosts New Zealand, the most successful team in the tournament, were looking to win the title for the first time since 2011.

Italy were the champions of the 2013 IRB Junior World Rugby Trophy, thus being promoted to the Championship. Fiji finished last in 2014 and therefore were relegated to the World Rugby Under 20 Trophy for 2015.

This was the final event to be known as the "IRB Junior World Championship". Following the renaming of the governing body as World Rugby, the Championship was renamed the World Rugby Under 20 Championship, and the second-tier competition was renamed from "IRB Junior World Rugby Trophy" to World Rugby U20 Trophy.

== Venues ==
The championship was held across three two location, Auckland and Pukekohe. ECOLight Stadium and QBE Stadium are only designated to the pool matches, while Eden Park will be used for top three play-offs; Final, 3rd place play-off and 5th place play-off.

City/Town	Venue	Capacity
Auckland	Eden Park	50,000
Auckland	QBE Stadium	25,000
Pukekohe	ECOLight Stadium	12,000

== Teams ==
The following teams participated in the 2014 IRB Junior World Championship:

Pool	Team	No. of Tournaments	Position 2013	Position 2014	Notes
A	Argentina	7	6th	9th	
A	Australia	7	7th	5th	
A	England	7	1st	1st	Champions
A	Italy	5	DNP	11th	Promoted from 2013 IRB Junior World Rugby Trophy
B	Fiji	7	11th	12th	Relegated to 2015 IRB Junior World Rugby Trophy
B	France	7	5th	6th	
B	Ireland	7	8th	4th	
B	Wales	7	2nd	7th	
C	Samoa	5	9th	8th	
C	Scotland	7	10th	10th	
C	New Zealand	7	4th	3rd	Bronze Medal Winner
C	South Africa	7	3rd	2nd	Runners-up

== Match officials ==
Below are the list of officials that officiated across the 30 matches:

Referees

- Federico Anselmi (Argentina)
- Angus Gardner (Australia)
- Matt O'Brien (Australia)
- Alexandre Ruiz (France)
- Akihisa Aso (Japan)
- Ben O'Keefe (New Zealand)
- Vlad Iordăchescu (Romania)
- Marius van der Westhuizen (South Africa)
- Joaquín Montes (Uruguay)

Reserve or Assistant Referees

- Brett Johnson (New Zealand)
- Richard Kelly (New Zealand)
- Angus Mabey (New Zealand)
- Shane McDermott (New Zealand)
- Brendon Pickerill (New Zealand)
- Grant Stuart (New Zealand)
- Paul Williams (New Zealand)

Television match officials

- Vinny Munro (New Zealand)
- Glenn Newman (New Zealand)
- Peter Nock (New Zealand)
- Aaron Paterson (New Zealand)
- Ben Skeen (New Zealand)
- Chris Wratt (New Zealand)

== Pool stage ==
The playing schedule and pools were announced on 28 November 2013.

Key to colours in group tables
Teams advances to Finals
Teams in the 5–8th place play-offs
Teams in the 9–12th place play-offs

All times are in New Zealand Standard Time (UTC+12)

The points awarded in the Pool Stage are as follows:

- 4 points for a win
- 2 points for a draw
- 1 bonus scoring point for scoring 4 or more tries
- 1 bonus losing point for losing by 7 or less points
- 0 points for a loss above 7 points

If at completion of the Pool Stage two or more teams are level on points the following tiebreakers are applied:

1. The winner of the Match in which the two tied Teams have played each other;
2. The Team which has the best difference between points scored for and points scored against in all its Pool Matches;
3. The Team which has the best difference between tries scored for and tries scored against in all its Pool Matches;
4. The Team which has scored most points in all its Pool Matches;
5. The Team which has scored most tries in all its Pool Matches; and
6. If none of the above produce a result, then it will be resolved with a toss of a coin.

Pld = matches played, W = matches won, D = draws, L = losses, PF = match points for, PA = match points against, PD = Points difference between match points for and match points against, TF = tries for, TA = tries against, BP = bonus points, Pts = pool points

=== Pool A ===
Team	Pld	W	D	L	PF	PA	PD	TF	TA	BP	Pts
England	3	3	0	0	118	43	+75	15	4	2	14
Australia	3	2	0	1	89	58	+31	11	7	2	10
Italy	3	1	0	2	35	118	−83	2	15	0	4
Argentina	3	0	0	3	59	82	−23	5	7	2	2

2 June 2014	Argentina	17–36	Australia	ECOLight Stadium, Pukekohe
13:35	Try: Heiland 30 c Montagner 67' c Con: Fernández (2/2) 32', 68'; Pen: Fernández (1/1) 39'	Report	Try: Alaalatoa 25' c Kellaway (2) 49' m, 60' c Lacey 64' m Con: McIntyre (2/4) 26', 61'; Pen: McIntyre (4/5) 2', 11', 19', 71'	Referee: (South Africa) Marius van der Westhuizen

2 June 2014	England	63–3	Italy	ECOLight Stadium, Pukekohe
17:35	Try: Earle (3) 12' m, 46' c, 48' c Jones (2) 21' c, 58' c Chisholm (2) 34' m, 51' c Burns 66' c Catchpole 74' m Con: Olver (5/7) 22', 47', 49', 52', 59'; Burns (1/2) 67'; Pen: Olver (2/2) 3', 9'	Report	Pen: Buscema (1/1) 7'; Cards: Derrick Appiah (yellow card) 25' to 35'	Referee: (Australia) Angus Gardner

6 June 2014	Argentina	26–29	Italy	QBE Stadium, Auckland
15:35	Try: Ramirez 18' c Ezcurra 44'; Con: Fernández (2/2) 19', 45'; Pen: Fernández (4/5) 3', 32', 54', 71'; Cards: Fernández (yellow card) 34' to 44'	Report	Try: Di Giulio 6' c Bruno 37'; Con: Buscema (2/2) 7', 38'; Pen: Buscema (4/7) 35', 43', 68', 75'; Drop: Buscema (1/2) 47'	Referee: (Australia) Matt O'Brien

6 June 2014	England	38–24	Australia	QBE Stadium, Auckland
17:35	Try: Taylor (2) 12' c, 18' c Earle (2) 31' c, 62' c Jones 43' c Con: Burns (5/5) 13', 19', 32', 44', 63'; Pen: Burns (1/3) 8'	Report	Try: Kellaway (2) 5' c, 34' c McIntyre 48' c Con: McIntyre (2/2) 6', 49'; Horwitz (1/1) 35'; Pen: McIntyre (1/1) 26'	Referee: (New Zealand) Ben O'Keeffe

10 June 2014	Australia	29–3	Italy	ECOLight Stadium, Pukekohe
15:35	Try: Kaitu'u 15' c Haylett-Perry 20' c Burton 39' c Jack Payne 51' m Con: Burton (3/4) 17', 22', 39'; Pen: Burton (1/1) 35'	Report	Pen: De Santis (1/1) 25'; Drop: De Santis (0/1)	Referee: (Romania) Vlad Iordăchescu

10 June 2014	England	17–16	Argentina	QBE Stadium, Auckland
17:35	Try: Catchpole 54' m Con: Olver (0/1); Pen: Olver (4/4) 4', 21', 25', 79'; Cards: Harry Rudkin (yellow card) 61' to 71'	Report	Try: Boffelli 70' c Con: Fernandez (1/1) 70'; Pen: Fernandez (3/5) 11', 24', 42'; Cards: Tomas Granella (yellow card) 25' to 35'	Referee: (Uruguay) Joaquín Montes

=== Pool B ===
Team	Pld	W	D	L	PF	PA	PD	TF	TA	BP	Pts
Ireland	3	2	0	1	86	40	+46	10	4	3	11
Wales	3	2	0	1	82	57	+25	10	7	1	9
France	3	2	0	1	59	31	+28	7	3	1	9
Fiji	3	0	0	3	24	123	−99	4	17	0	0

2 June 2014	Wales	48–19	Fiji	ECOLight Stadium, Pukekohe
15:35	Try: Howells 1' m Benjamin (2) 28' m, 66' c Penalty Try (2) 40' c, 52' c Roach 80' m Con: O'Brien (3/6) 40', 53', 68'; Pen: O'Brien (4/4', 8', 11', 37	Report	Try: Robarobalevu 13' m Tabualevu 34' c Toga 78' c Con: Mroisio (1/2) 35'; Kurukava (1/1) 79'; Cards: Lote Nasiga (yellow card) 23' to 33'; Aseri Robarobalevu (yellow card) 39' to 79'	Referee: (Japan) Akihisa Aso

2 June 2014	France	19–13	Ireland	QBE Stadium, Auckland
17:35	Try: Roux 30' c Con: Serin (1/1) 32'; Pen: Serin (2/2) 9', 14'; Drop: Fajardo (2/2) 35', 63'	Report	Try: Kelleher 35' c Con: Byrne (1/1) 36'; Pen: Byrne (1/2) 6'; McKeon (1/1) 68'	Referee: (Australia) Matt O'Brien

6 June 2014	France	37–5	Fiji	ECOLight Stadium, Pukekohe
15:35	Try: Daubagna 16' m Penalty Try 34' c Lespinasse 48' m Fontaine 57' c Courcoul 63' m Bonneval 74' m Con: Daubagna (2/5) 34', 58'; Meret (0/1); Pen: Daubagna (0/1); Cards: Simon Courcoul (yellow card) 40' to 50'	Report	Try: Mudu 40' m Con: Kurukava (0/1); Cards: Vincent Sosefo (yellow card) 35' to 45'; Maika Baleinaloto (red card) 31'	Referee: (Romania) Vlad Iordăchescu

6 June 2014	Wales	21–35	Ireland	ECOLight Stadium, Pukekohe
17:35	Try: Morgan 20' c Penalty Try 39' c Benjamin 46' c Con: O'Brien (3/3) 21', 40', 47'; Drop: O'Brien (0/1); Cards: Jack Dixon (yellow card) 66' to 76'	Report	Try: Burke 4' c Ringrose (2) 11' c, 51' c Kelleher 76' m Con: Byrne (3/4) 5', 12', 52'; Pen: Byrne (3/4) 24', 59', 72'	Referee: (Argentina) Federico Anselmi

10 June 2014	Ireland	38–0	Fiji	QBE Stadium, Auckland
13:35	Try: Penalty Try (3) 31' c, 40' c, 67'; Gaffney 49' c McKeon 78' c Con: Ringrose (5/5) 32', 41', 50', 68', 79'; Pen: Ringrose (1/2) 8'	Report	Pen: Kurokava (0/1); Vueti (0/1); Cards: Vincent Sosefo (yellow card) 30' to 40'; Ameniasi Natuiyaga (yellow card) 37' to 47'; Aseri Robarobalevu (yellow card) 40' to 50'	Referee: (France) Alexandre Ruiz

10 June 2014	Wales	13–3	France	QBE Stadium, Auckland
15:35	Try: Williams 53' c Con: O'Brien (1/1) 53'; Pen: O'Brien (2/3) 26', 41'	Report	Pen: Serin (1/1) 23'; Drop: Serin (0/1)	Referee: (South Africa) Marius van der Westhuizen

=== Pool C ===
Team	Pld	W	D	L	PF	PA	PD	TF	TA	BP	Pts
South Africa	3	3	0	0	115	37	+78	16	5	2	14
New Zealand	3	2	0	1	126	52	+74	18	7	2	10
Samoa	3	1	0	2	47	87	−40	6	13	0	4
Scotland	3	0	0	3	30	142	−112	5	20	0	0

2 June 2014	South Africa	61–5	Scotland	QBE Stadium, Auckland
15:35	Try: Schoeman 17' c Petersen 28' c Greeff (2) 45' c, 79' c Kriel (2) 49' c, 74' c Marx 56' c Gelant 58' c Davis 65' m Con: Pollard (7/8) 17', 29', 46', 50', 57', 59', 74'; Du Plessis 80'; Pen: Pollard (0/1)	Report	Try: Farndale 9' m Con: Chalmers (0/1)	Referee: (Uruguay) Joaquín Montes

2 June 2014	New Zealand	48–12	Samoa	QBE Stadium, Auckland
19:35	Try: Garden-Bachop (2) 12' m, 48' m Drummond 23' c Peni 36' c Li 72' c Lienert-Brown 76' c Harris 78' c Con: Mo'unga (2/4) 24', 37'; Hickey (3/3) 74', 77', 79'; Pen: Mo'unga (1/1) 6'	Report	Try: Lee 40' c Apa 59' m Con: Mu (1/2) 40'	Referee: (Argentina) Federico Anselmi

6 June 2014	Scotland	18–27	Samoa	ECOLight Stadium, Pukekohe
13:35	Try: Farndale 37' m Pecquer 51' m Ritchie 72' m Con: Hutchinson (0/1); Lowe (0/2); Pen: Hutchinson (1/2) 19'	Report	Try: Kueffner 24' c Apa 43' c Mu 47' c Con: Mu (3/3) 25', 44', 48'; Pen: Mu (2/2) 5', 69'; Cards: Cameron Skelton (yellow card) 30' to 40'; Jotham Wrampling (yellow card) 31' to 41'	Referee: (Australia) Angus Gardner

6 June 2014	New Zealand	24–33	South Africa	QBE Stadium, Auckland
19:35	Try: Li (3) 13' c, 24' c, 78' c Con: Hickey (2/2) 14', 25'; Mo'unga (1/1) 78'; Pen: Hickey (1/1) 36'; Cards: James Tucker (yellow card) 71' to 80'	Report	Try: Kriel 32' m Pollard 47' c Greeff 57' m Gelant 71' c Con: Pollard (2/4) 47', 72'; Pen: Pollard (3/3) 7', 11', 31'; Drop: Pollard (0/1)	Referee: (France) Alexandre Ruiz

10 June 2014	Samoa	8–21	South Africa	ECOLight Stadium, Pukekohe
17:35	Try: Apa 31' m Con: Talataina Mu (0/1); Pen: Talataina Mu (1/4) 40'; Cards: Richard Mariota (yellow card) 34' to 44'; Nathaniel Apa (yellow card) 48' to 58'	Report	Try: Davis 37' c Esterhuizen 63' c Petersen 79' c Con: Pollard (3/3) 38', 64', 79'; Pen: Pollard (0/2)	Referee: (New Zealand) Ben O'Keeffe

10 June 2014	New Zealand	54–7	Scotland	ECOLight Stadium, Pukekohe
19:35	Try: Sanders 11' c Renton (2) 15'c, 48' c Jacobson 34' c McKenzie 58' c Faiane 65' m Aso 71' c Fukofuka 80' c Con: Hickey (2/2) 12', 16'; Mo'unga (5/6) 35', 49', 59', 72', 80'	Report	Try: Hoyland 76' c Con: Lowe (1/1) 77'; Pen: Chalmers (0/2)	Referee: (Japan) Akihisa Aso

=== Standings after Pool Stage ===
Overall Standings
Pool Pos	Pos	Team	Pld	W	D	L	PF	PA	PD	TF	TA	BP	Pts
C1	1	South Africa	3	3	0	0	115	37	+78	16	5	2	14
A1	2	England	3	3	0	0	118	43	+75	15	4	2	14
B1	3	Ireland	3	2	0	1	86	40	+46	10	4	3	11
C2	4	New Zealand	3	2	0	1	126	52	+74	18	7	2	10
A2	5	Australia	3	2	0	1	89	58	+31	11	7	2	10
B2	6	Wales	3	2	0	1	82	57	+25	10	7	1	9
B3	7	France	3	2	0	1	59	31	+28	7	−3	1	9
C3	8	Samoa	3	1	0	2	47	87	−40	6	13	0	4
A3	9	Italy	3	1	0	2	35	118	−83	2	15	0	4
A4	10	Argentina	3	0	0	3	59	82	−23	5	7	2	2
B4	11	Fiji	3	0	0	3	24	123	−89	4	17	0	0
C4	12	Scotland	3	0	0	3	30	142	−112	5	20	0	0

== Knockout stage ==
=== 9–12th place play-offs ===
Semifinals
Argentina	38
Fiji	12
Italy	18
Scotland	21

9th place
Argentina	41
Scotland	21
11th place
Fiji	17
Italy	22

==== Semifinals ====
15 June 2014	Argentina	38–12	Fiji	ECOLight Stadium, Pukekohe
12:35	Try: penalty try 13' c Alvarez 35' m Gigena 56' m Schulz 60' m Bazan Velez 77' c Con: Fernandez (2/5) 13', 78'; Pen: Fernandez (3/3) 23', 33', 39'; Drop: Boffelli (0/1)	Report	Try: Lagi 64' m Vueti 75' c Con: Kurokava (0/1); Vueti (1/1) 65'; Cards: Vasikali Mudu (yellow card) 13' to 23'	Referee: (New Zealand) Ben O'Keefe

15 June 2014	Italy	18–21	Scotland	ECOLight Stadium, Pukekohe
15:05	Try: D. Di Giulio 34' m Giammarioli 68' c Con: Buscema (1/2) 69'; Pen: Buscema (2/4) 4', 21'; Drop: Buscema (0/1)	Report	Try: Ritchie 45' c Irvine-Hess 54' c Rae 59' c Con: R. Hutchison (3/3) 46', 55', 60'	Referee: (Uruguay) Joaquín Montes

==== 11th place game ====
20 June 2014	Fiji	17–22	Italy	QBE Stadium, Auckland
12:35	Try: Kurukava 46' c Mudu 80' c Con: Fraser (1/1) 47'; Vueti (1/1) 80'; Pen: Fraser (1/2) 20'; Cards: Samu Tawake (yellow card) 71' to 80'	Report	Try: Parisotto 14' m Cornelli 32' c Daniele 54' m Di Giulio 73' m Con: Buscema (1/2) 32'; De Santis (0/2)	Referee: (Romania) Vlad Iordăchescu

==== 9th place game ====
20 June 2014	Argentina	41–21	Scotland	QBE Stadium, Auckland
15:05	Try: Lezana 20' c Montagner 30' c Fernandez 69' c Boffelli 79' m Con: Fernandez (3/4) 21', 31', 70'; Pen: Fernandez (5/7) 10', 26', 34', 57', 78',	Report	Try: Bradbury 35' c MacDonald 45' c Lowe 64' c Con: Hutchinson (2/2) 36', 46'; Lowe (1/1) 65'	Referee: (Australia) Angus Gardner

=== 5–8th place play-offs ===
Semifinals
Australia	53
Samoa	16
Wales	18
France	19

5th place
Australia	34
France	27
7th place
Samoa	3
'Wales	20

==== Semifinals ====
15 June 2014	Australia	53–16	Samoa	QBE Stadium, Auckland
14:35	Try: Kellaway (4) 8' m, 17' c, 24' c, 57' c Lacey (2) 13' c, 49' m Stewart 43' c Foketi 64' m Con: McIntyre (5/7) 14', 18', 25', 44', 58'; Pen: McIntyre (1/1) 5'	Report	Try: Luamanu 70' m Fa'aso'o 78' m Con: Talataina Mu (0/2); Pen: Fagasua (1/1) 3'; Talataina Mu (1/1) 39'; Cards: Jotham Wrampling (yellow card) 46' to 56'	Referee: (South Africa) Marius van der Westhuizen

15 June 2014	Wales	18–19	France	ECOLight Stadium, Pukekohe
17:35	Try: Dixon 19' c Tyler Morgan 31' c Con: O'Brien (1/2) 20'; Pen: O'Brien (2/4) 5', 47'	Report	Try: Thomas 2' c Raynaud 37' m Singer 67' c Con: Serin (2/3) 3', 69'; Pen: Serin (0/1); Cards: Tommy Raynaud (yellow card) 46' to 56'	Referee: (Australia) Matt O'Brien

==== 7th place game ====
20 June 2014	Wales	20–3	Samoa	QBE Stadium, Auckland
17:35	Try: Howells 6' m Benjamin (2) 20' m, 64' c Con: Davies (1/3) 65'; Pen: Davies (1/2) 25'	Report	Pen: Mu (1/1) 14'; Cards: Ieremia Mataena (yellow card) 24' to 34'	Referee: (Japan) Akihisa Aso

==== 5th place game ====
20 June 2014	France	27–34	Australia	Eden Park, Auckland
14:35	Try: Blanc 2' c Hamdaoui 9' c Mignot 28' c Con: Serin (3/3) 3', 10', 29'; Pen: Serin (1/2) 14'; Drop: Fajardo (1/1) 10'	Report	Try: McMahon (2) 16' c, 20' c Kellaway (2) 45' c, 56' m Scoble 76' m Con: McIntyre (3/4) 17', 21', 46'; Horwitz (0/1); Pen: Burton (1/1) 80'	Referee: (Argentina) Federico Anselmi

=== Finals ===
Semifinals
England	42
Ireland	15
South Africa	32
New Zealand	25

Final
England	21
South Africa	20
3rd place
Ireland	23
New Zealand	45

==== Semifinals ====
15 June 2014	England	42–15	Ireland	QBE Stadium, Auckland
17:05	Try: Sloan 8' c Hobbs-Awoyemi 21' c Packman 27' c Woolstencroft 33' c Jones 54' m Con: Burns (4/5) 9', 22', 28', 34'; Pen: Burns (2/2) 4', 12'; Drop: Packman (1/1) 48'	Report	Try: Ringrose 50' c Wootton 68' m Con: Byrne (1/1) 50'; Pen: Byrne (1/1) 19'	Referee: (Australia) Angus Gardner

15 June 2014	South Africa	32–25	New Zealand	QBE Stadium, Auckland
19:35	Try: Pollard 15' c Petersen 51' c Esterhuizen 70' m Els 78' c Con: Pollard (3/4) 16', 52', 79'; Pen: Pollard (2/3) 40', 57'; Drop: Pollard (0/1); Cards: André Esterhuizen (yellow card) 29' to 39'	Report	Try: Faiva 4' m Li 32' c Aso 66' c Con: Mo'unga (0/1); McKenzie (2/2) 33', 67'; Pen: McKenzie (2/2) 30', 42'	Referee: (Argentina) Federico Anselmi

==== 3rd place game ====
20 June 2014	Ireland	23–45	New Zealand	Eden Park, Auckland
17:05	Try: penalty try 23' c Heffernan 32' c Con: Byrne (2/2) 24', 33'; Pen: Byrne (3/3) 10', 15', 28'; Cards: Cian Kelleher (yellow card) 60' to 70'	Report	Try: Li (2) 8' c, 29' c Mo'unga (2) 20' c, 72' c Tucker 50' m Drummond 67' c Boshier 79' m Con: McKenzie (5/7) 9', 21', 30', 68', 73'; Cards: James Tucker (yellow card) 27' to 37'; (yellow card) 74' to 80'	Referee: (France) Alexandre Ruiz

==== Final ====
20 June 2014	England	21–20	South Africa	Eden Park, Auckland
19:35	Try: Earle 39' m Conlon 52' c Con: Burns (1/2) 53'; Pen: Burns (2/3) 17', 44'; Morris (1/1) 37'	Report	Try: Kriel (2) 20' c, 64' c Con: Pollard (2/2) 21', 65'; Pen: Pollard (2/2) 14', 46'; Drop: Pollard (0/1)	Referee: (New Zealand) Ben O'Keefe
