= 2013 IRB Junior World Championship =

Tournament details
- Host: France
- Date: 5–23 June 2013
- Teams: 12

Final positions
- Champions: England
- Runner-up: Wales
- Third place: South Africa

Tournament statistics
- Matches played: 30

The 2013 IRB Junior World Championship was the sixth, IRB Junior World Championship, an annual international rugby union competition for Under 20 national teams. The event was organised in France by rugby's governing body, the IRB. A total of twelve nations played in the tournament. South Africa went into the tournament as defending champions, after winning the tournament for the first time in 2012. England were crowned the 2013 champions for the first time after defeating Wales 23–15 in the final on the 23 June at Stade de la Rabine in Vannes.

After finishing last at the 2012 IRB Junior World Championship, Italy were relegated to the IRB Junior World Trophy and therefore didn't participate in this year's event. After finishing first at the 2012 IRB Junior World Rugby Trophy, the United States were promoted to this competition for 2013. Their stay in the IRB Junior World Championship was short-lived, however, as they lost in the 11th-place final to Fiji 46–12 and were relegated to the IRB Junior World Trophy, being replaced for the 2014 competition by its winners Italy.

== Venues ==
The championship was held in La Roche-sur-Yon, Vannes and Nantes in France. In an effort to improve TV broadcasting for all matches, only three venues were used.

For the first time since the competitions inception, the final was contested by two northern hemisphere teams. Also for the first time New Zealand did not participate in the final.

Pool	City	Venue	Capacity
Pool A	La Roche-sur-Yon	Stade Henri Desgranges	10,000
Pool B	Vannes	Stade de la Rabine	9,500
Pool C	Nantes	Stade Pascal Laporte	

== Teams ==
The following teams participated in the 2013 IRB Junior World Championship:

Pool	Team	No. of Tournaments	Position 2012	Position 2013	Notes
A	England	5	7th	1st	Champions
A	France	5	6th	5th	
A	South Africa	5	1st	3rd	Bronze Medal Winner
A	United States	2	DNP^{1}	12th	Promoted from 2012 IRB Junior World Rugby Trophy; Relegated to 2014 IRB Junior World Rugby Trophy
B	Australia	5	8th	7th	
B	Fiji	5	11th	11th	
B	Ireland	5	5th	8th	
B	New Zealand	5	2nd	4th	
C	Argentina	5	4th	6th	
C	Samoa	4	10th	9th	
C	Scotland	5	9th	10th	
C	Wales	5	3rd	2nd	Runners-up

^{1} United States were promoted from the 2012 IRB Junior World Rugby Trophy.

== Pool stage ==
The following playing schedule was released in November 2012:

Key to colours in group tables
Teams advances to Finals
Teams in the 5–8th place play-offs
Teams in the 9–12th place play-offs

All times are in Central European Summer Time (UTC+2).

=== Pool A ===
Team	Pld	W	D	L	TF	PF	PA	PD	BP	Pts
South Africa	3	3	0	0	22	154	43	+111	1	13
England	3	2	0	1	23	163	37	+126	2	10
France	3	1	0	2	9	70	59	+11	2	6
United States	3	0	0	3	0	3	251	−248	0	0

5 June 2013
18:45

France	6–30	England
Pen: Serin (2/3) 26', 41'	Report	Try: Cowan-Dickie 23' c Clifford (2) 56' c, 80' c Con: Slade (3/3) 24', 56', 80'; Pen: Slade (3/5) 15', 29', 79'

Stade Henri Desgranges, La Roche-sur-Yon
Referee: Stuart Berry (South Africa)

5 June 2013
20:45

South Africa	97–0	United States
Try: Beerwinkel 5'; Kolbe 13'; Senatla (4) 14', 28', 31', 42'; Steenkamp 19'; Geduld (2) 22', 26'; Du Toit 36'; Kriel (2) 44', 67'; Willemse (2) 50', 57'; Obi (2) 52', 60'; Con: Pollard (1/6) 19'; Du Preez (6/10); Pen: Pollard (1/1) 3'	Report

Stade Henri Desgranges, La Roche-sur-Yon
Referee: Shuhei Kubo (Japan)

9 June 2013
16:45

South Africa	31–24	England
Try: Senatla (2) 1' c, 31' m Du Plessis 42' c Con: Du Preez (2/3) 2', 42'; Pen: Du Preez (4/6) 6', 10', 16', 56'	Report	Try: Sloan 36' c Stooke 41' c Purdy 59' c Con: Slade (3/3) 36', 41', 60'; Pen: Slade (1/3) 48'

Stade Henri Desgranges, La Roche-sur-Yon
Referee: Mike Fraser (New Zealand)

9 June 2013
18:45

France	45–3	United States
Try: Jedrasiak 13' c Parez 28' c Lacroix 43' c Cros 45' c Duhalde 61' c Wieprecht 78' c Con: Mallet (6/6) 14', 29', 43', 46', 62', 78'; Pen: Mallet (1/1) 9'	Report	Pen: Bourke (1/1) 25'

Stade Henri Desgranges, La Roche-sur-Yon
Referee: Andrew McMenemy (Scotland)

13 June 2013
18:45

England	109–0	United States
Try: Purdy (2) 1' m, 59' c Day (3) 4' m, 16' c, 49' c Sisi (2) 9' c, 63' c Moriarty (3) 19' m, 54' c, 68' m Conlon (2) 21' c, 41' c Devoto 29' m Howard (2) 37' c, 44' c Stephenson (2) 56' c, 74' c Con: Hooley (11/16) 10', 16', 21', 41', 44', 50', 54', 56', 59', 63', 75'; Devoto (1/1) 37'	Report

Stade Henri Desgranges, La Roche-sur-Yon
Referee: Andrew Lees (Australia)

13 June 2013
20:45

France	19–26	South Africa
Try: Regard 8' c Tauleigne 49' m Serin 64' c Con: Selponi (1/2) 9'; Serin (1/1) 64'	Report	Try: Swanepoel 1' m Obi 42' c Kolbe 78' m Con: Pollard (1/3) 42'; Pen: Pollard (3/3) 14', 44', 70'

Stade Henri Desgranges, La Roche-sur-Yon
Referee: Marius Mitrea (Italy)

=== Pool B ===
Team	Pld	W	D	L	TF	PF	PA	PD	BP	Pts
New Zealand	3	3	0	0	13	104	42	+62	2	14
Ireland	3	2	0	1	10	96	49	+47	2	10
Australia	3	1	0	2	10	71	45	+26	2	6
Fiji	3	0	0	3	2	21	156	−135	0	0

5 June 2013
18:45

Ireland	19–15	Australia
Try: Scholes 25' c Con: Daly (1/1) 26'; Pen: Daly (4/6) 6', 47', 66', 76'	Report	Try: Staniforth 40' m Northam 73' c Con: Burton (1/1) 73'; Pen: Seuteni (1/2) 30'

Stade de la Rabine, Vannes
Referee: Luke Pearce (England)

5 June 2013
20:45

New Zealand	59–6	Fiji
Try: Savea 1' c Collins (2) 4' m, 75' c Fuatai (2) 34' c, 64' c Visinia 40' c Van Dam (2) 46' m, 80' m Scrafton 59' m Con: Adams (3/5) 1', 34', 40'; Rangihuna (2/4) 64', 75'; Pen: Adams (2/2) 18', 26'	Report	Pen: Waqa (2/3) 12', 15'

Stade de la Rabine, Vannes
Referee: Andrew McMenemy (Scotland)

9 June 2013
18:45

Ireland	51–3	Fiji
Try: Sweetnam (2) 15' m, 72' c Taylor 44' c Scholes (2) 48' m, 51' m Leavy 65' m Con: Daly (1/4) 45'; Scannell (1/2) 72'; Pen: Daly (3/5) 10', 29', 36'; Scannell (1/1) 70'	Report	Pen: Waqa (1/2) 24'

Stade de la Rabine, Vannes
Referee: Shuhei Kubo (Japan)

9 June 2013
20:45

New Zealand	14–10	Australia
Try: Edwards 21' m Pen: Hickey (3/3) 6', 10', 16'	Report	Try: Burton 60' c Con: Hodge (1/1) 61'; Pen: Hodge (1/2) 25'

Stade de la Rabine, Vannes
Referee: Dudley Phillips (Ireland)

13 June 2013
18:45

New Zealand	31–26	Ireland
Try: Tuipulotu 31' m Faiva (2) 45' m, 54' m Visinia 48' c Con: Hickey (1/4) 49'; Pen: Hickey (3/5) 16', 19', 39'	Report	Try: Farrell 34' m Leavy 58' m Bryne 66' c Con: Scannell (1/3) 67'; Pen: Scannell (2/2) 11', 22'; Roche (1/1) 70'

Stade de la Rabine, Vannes
Referee: Ian Davies (Wales)

13 June 2013
20:45

Australia	46–12	Fiji
Try: Hodge 10' m Browning 29' c Lacey 34' m Baldwin 39' c Northam 53' m Burton (2) 65' c, 68' c Con: Hodge (2/5) 30', 40'; Burton (2/2) 65', 69'	Report	Try: Qionimacawa 15' m Bolenaivalu 58' c Con: Bower (1/1) 59'

Stade de la Rabine, Vannes
Referee: Mike Fraser (New Zealand)

=== Pool C ===
Team	Pld	W	D	L	TF	PF	PA	PD	BP	Pts
Wales	3	3	0	0	9	93	44	+49	1	13
Argentina	3	2	0	1	9	92	54	+38	2	10
Scotland	3	1	0	2	9	70	103	–33	2	6
Samoa	3	0	0	3	6	52	106	–54	2	2

5 June 2013
18:00

Wales	42–3	Samoa
Try: Amos 12' m Dixon 20' c C. Jones 53' c Bennett 62' c I. Jones 65' m Dee 78' m Con: Davies (3/5) 21', 54', 63'; Pen: Davies (2/3) 27', 30'	Report	Pen: Ah Ki (1/3) 15'

Stade Pascal Laporte, Nantes
Referee: Andrew Lees (Australia)

5 June 2013
20:00

Argentina	44–13	Scotland
Try: Penalty try 10' c Etchart 28' c Ezcurra 76' c Fernandez 77' m Con: Fernandez (3/4) 11', 29', 76'; Pen: Fernandez (5/6) 6', 14', 38', 39', 45', 62'	Report	Try: Farndale 23' m Bennett 73' m Pen: Allan (1/2) 20'

Stade Pascal Laporte, Nantes
Referee: Marius Mitrea (Italy)

9 June 2013
15:00

Argentina	28–16	Samoa
Try: Bernardini 29' m Mazzoni 57' c Penalty try 63' c Con: Fernandez (2/2) 58', 64'; Pen: Boffelli (2/4) 12', 22; Fernandez (1/1) 52'	Report	Try: Solia 76' c Con: Ah Ki (1/1) 77'; Pen: Fenika (3/5) 3', 15', 19'

Stade Pascal Laporte, Nantes
Referee: Ian Davies (Wales)

9 June 2013
17:00

Wales	26–21	Scotland
Try: Warren 14' c Huges 57' c Con: Davies (2/2) 15', 58'; Pen: Davies (3/3) 10', 56', 62'; Drop: Davies 28'	Report	Try: Ashe 51' c Masterson 76' m Con: Allan (1/2) 52'; Pen: Allan (3/3) 31', 38', 44'

Stade Pascal Laporte, Nantes
Referee: Stuart Berry (South Africa)

13 June 2013
16:45

Wales	25–20	Argentina
Try: Amos 19' c Con: Davies (1/1) 20'; Pen: Davies (5/5) 1', 17', 61', 69', 79'; Drop: Davies 65'	Report	Try: Matera 50' c Cordero 76' c Con: Fernandez (2/2) 50', 76'; Pen: Fernandez (2/3) 52', 58'

Stade Pascal Laporte, Nantes
Referee: Luke Pearce (England)

13 June 2013
19:00

Scotland	36–33	Samoa
Try: Farndale 12' c Allan 25' c Hoyland 27' c Fergusson 53' m Kilmartin 59' c Con: Allan (3/3) 13', 26', 28'; Cooper (1/2) 60'; Pen: Cooper (1/1) 78'	Report	Try: Nanai 10' m Broomhall 36' c Amituanai 43' c Peni 62' c Sam 66' c Con: Ah Ki (1/2) 37'; Alatimu (3/3) 44', 63', 67'

Stade Pascal Laporte, Nantes
Referee: Dudley Phillips (Ireland

=== Pool stage rankings ===
Overall standings
Pos	Team	Pld	W	D	L	TF	PF	PA	PD	BP	Pts
1	New Zealand	3	3	0	0	14	104	42	+62	2	14
2	South Africa	3	3	0	0	22	154	43	+111	1	13
3	Wales	3	3	0	0	9	93	44	+49	1	13
4	England	3	2	0	1	23	163	37	+126	2	10
5	Ireland	3	2	0	1	12	96	49	+47	2	10
6	Argentina	3	2	0	1	9	92	53	+39	2	10
7	Australia	3	1	0	2	10	71	45	+36	2	7
8	France	3	1	0	2	9	70	59	+11	2	6
9	Scotland	3	1	0	2	9	70	103	−33	2	6
10	Samoa	3	0	0	3	6	52	106	−54	2	2
11	Fiji	3	0	0	3	2	21	151	−130	0	0
12	United States	3	0	0	3	0	3	251	−248	0	0

== Knockout stage ==
=== 9–12th place play-offs ===
Semi-finals
Samoa	19
Fiji	18
Scotland	39
United States	3

9th place
Samoa	33
Scotland	24
11th place
Fiji	46
United States	12

==== Semi-finals ====
18 June 2013
18:00

Samoa	19–18	Fiji
Try: Solia 79' m Ah Ki 80' m Pen: Alatimu (3/5) 17', 33', 39'	Report	Try: Waqa 34' c Rokoduru 51' m Con: Waga (1/2) 36'; Pen: Waga (2/3) 65', 75'

Stade Pascal Laporte, Nantes
Referee: Mike Fraser (New Zealand)

18 June 2013
20:15

Scotland	39–3	United States
Try: Steele 39' c Bennett (2) 44' c, 58' c Kilmartin 75' m Auld 80' c Con: Bennett (3/3) 39', 45', 58'; Cooper (1/2) 80'; Pen: Bennett (2/2) 7', 11'	Report	Pen: Audsley (1/1) 8'

Stade Pascal Laporte, Nantes
Referee: Shuhei Kubo (Japan)

==== 11th place game ====
23 June 2013
17:15

Fiji	46–12	United States
Try: Waqa (3) 5' c, 42' m, 79' c Tuisese 12' m Doge 28' m Vatubua 34' m Rarasea 75' c Kunavore 80' m Con: Waqa (1/5) 6'; Douglas (2/3) 76', 80'	Report	Try: Toluta'u 53' m Lindell 60' c Con: Audsley (1/2) 61'

Stade Pascal Laporte, Nantes
Referee: Stuart Berry (South Africa)

==== 9th place game ====
23 June 2013
15:00

Samoa	33–24	Scotland
Try: Nanai (2) 5' m, 10' c Slater 29' m Fonoti 72' c Con: Alatimu (2/4) 11', 73'; Pen: Alatimu (3/3) 22', 46', 76'	Report	Try: Allan 13' c Hoyland 16' c Fergusson 63' c Con: Allan (3/3) 14', 17', 64'; Pen: Allan (1/3) 26'

Stade Pascal Laporte, Nantes
Referee: Luke Pearce (England)

=== 5–8th place play-offs ===
Semi-finals
Argentina	22
Australia	15
Ireland	8
France	9

5th place
Argentina	34
France	37
7th place
Australia	28
Ireland	17

==== Semi-finals ====
18 June 2013
18:00

Argentina	22–15	Australia
Try: Fernandez (2) 36' c, 71' m Schulz 45' c Con: Fernandez (2/3) 37', 45'; Pen: Fernandez (1/3) 17'	Report	Try: Latu 13' c Paraka 58' m Con: Burton (1/2) 13'; Pen: Burton (1/2) 43'

Stade de la Rabine, Vannes
Referee: Dudley Phillips (Ireland)

18 June 2013
20:15

Ireland	8–9	France
Try: Murphy 30' m Pen: Scannell (1/2) 63'	Report	Pen: Serin (3/4) 2', 34', 47'

Stade de la Rabine, Vannes
Referee: Andrew Lees (Australia)

==== 7th place game ====
23 June 2013
15:00

Australia	28–17	Ireland
Try: Parker 20' c Wells 24' c Northam 63' m Con: Burton (2/3) 20', 25'; Pen: McIntyre (1/1) 4'; Burton (2/2) 13', 52'	Report	Try: Scholes 42' m Pen: Scannell (4/6) 36', 41', 56', 61'

Stade Henri Desgranges, La Roche-sur-Yon
Referee: Marius Mitrea (Italy)

==== 5th place game ====
23 June 2013
17:15

Argentina	34–37	France
Try: Lezana (2) 16' c, 61' c Matera 39' m Con: Fernandez (2/3) 17', 61'; Pen: Fernandez (5/5) 12', 20', 26', 30', 35'	Report	Try: Thomas (2) 2' m, 78' c Jedrasiak 76' c Con: Mallet (2/2) 76', 78'; Pen: Selponi (1/1) 42'; Mallet (3/3) 46', 55', 64'; Drop: Mallet 59', 68'

Stade Henri Desgranges, La Roche-sur-Yon
Referee: Ian Davies

=== Finals ===
Semi-finals
South Africa	17
Wales	18
New Zealand	21
England	33

Final
Wales	15
England	23
3rd place
South Africa	41
New Zealand	34

==== Semi-finals ====
18 June 2013
18:15

South Africa	17–18	Wales
Try: Herbst 36' c Smith 59' c Con: Pollard (2/2) 37', 60'; Pen: Pollard (1/4) 75'	Report	Try: Jenkins 56' m Evans 79' c Con: Davies (1/2) 80'; Pen: Davies (2/3) 20', 30'

Stade de la Rabine, Vannes
Referee: Luke Pearce (England)

18 June 2013
20:45

New Zealand	21–33	England
Try: Faiva 9' m Emery 59' c Con: Rure (1/1) 59'; Pen: Hickey (1/1) 40'; Te Rure (2/2) 54', 73'	Report	Try: Hankin 16' c Watson 37' c Smallbone 76' c Con: Slade (3/3) 16', 38', 77'; Pen: Slade (4/4) 5', 12', 51', 80'

Stade de la Rabine, Vannes
Referee: Stuart Berry (South Africa)

==== Third place game ====
23 June 2013
15:15

South Africa	41–34	New Zealand
Try: Obi 34' c De Bruin 37' c Senatla 40' c Steenkamp 52' m Smith 56' c Ungerer 71' m Con: Pollard (4/6) 35', 38', 40', 56'; Pen: Pollard (1/2) 61'	Report	Try: Visinia (2) 8' c, 14' c Edwards 21' c Webber 40' m Manihera 77' m Con: Hickey (3/4) 9', 15', 22'; Pen: Hickey (1/1) 46'

Stade de la Rabine, Vannes
Referee: Dudley Phillips (Ireland)

==== Final ====
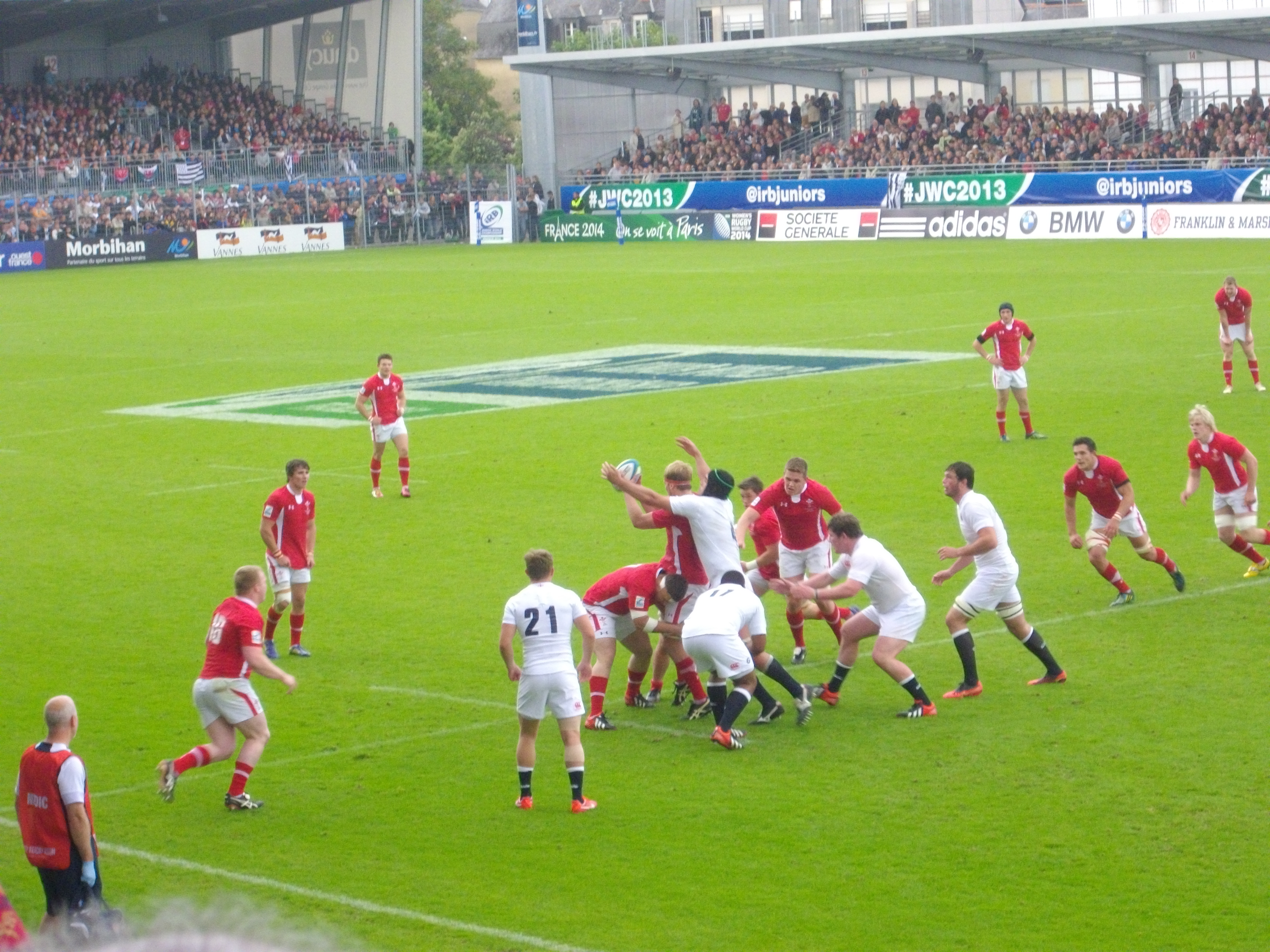
Final - England vs Wales

23 June 2013
18:45

Wales	15–23	England
Try: Evans (2) 11' m, 25' c Con: Davies (1/2) 26'; Pen: Davies (1/1) 23'	Report	Try: Nowell 58' c Hill 63' c Con: Slade (2/2) 58', 63'; Pen: Slade (3/5) 16', 72', 76'

Stade de la Rabine, Vannes
Referee: Mike Fraser (New Zealand)
