= Luke Burton =

Australian rugby union player

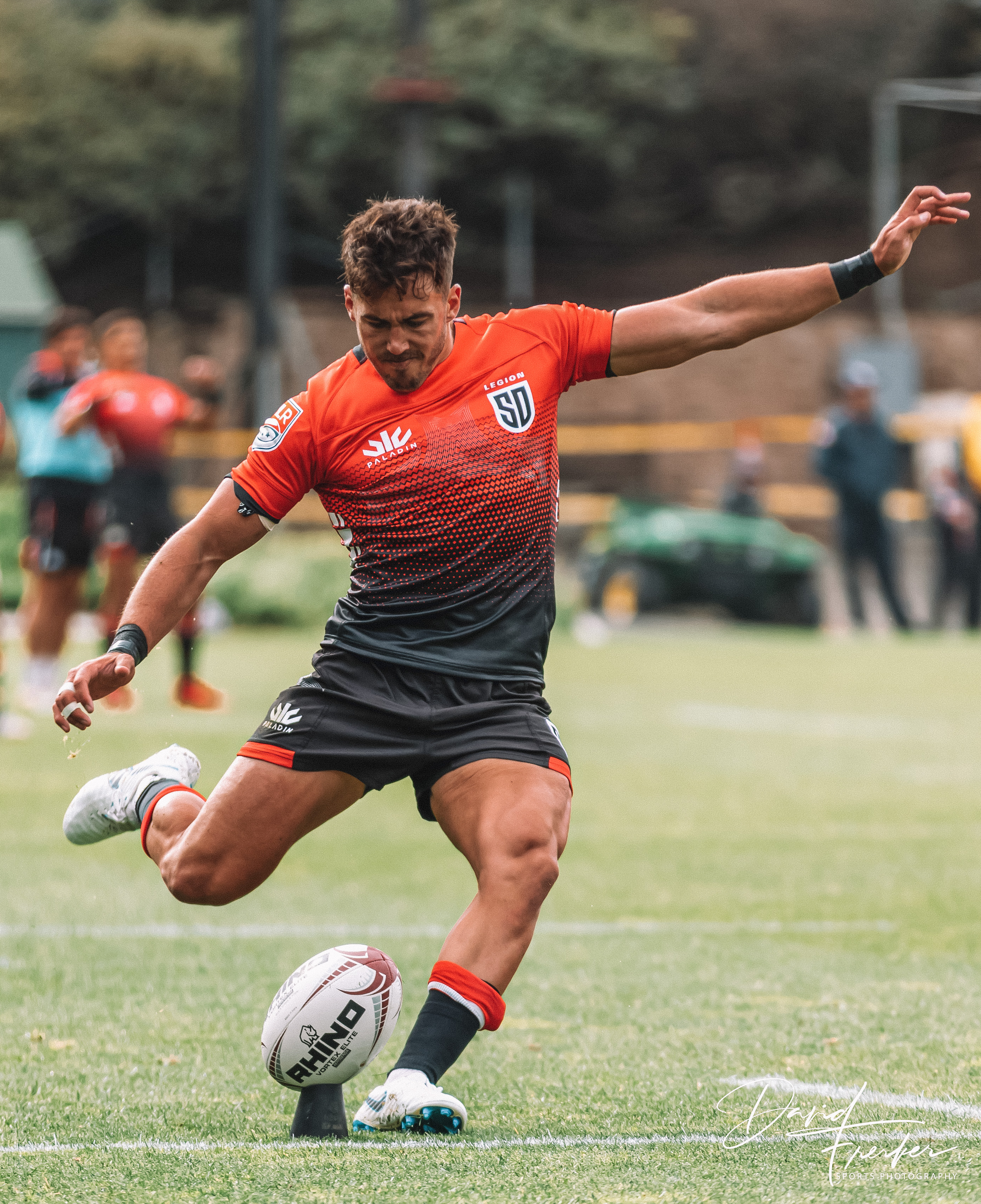
- Burton playing for the San Diego Legion
- Full name: Luke Burton
- Born: 17 February 1994 (age 32) Perth, Western Australia
- Height: 1.82 m (6 ft 0 in)
- Weight: 92 kg (14 st 7 lb; 203 lb)
- School: Hale School
- Notable relative: Jesse Kriel Dan Kriel (Cousins)
- Occupation: Professional Rugby Player

Rugby union career
- Position: Fly-Half / Centre
- Current team: San Diego Legion
Senior career
Years	Team	Apps	(Points)
2014–2017	Force	25	(47)
2014–2017	Perth Spirit	21	(14)
2017–2019	Biarritz	42	(101)
2020	San Diego Legion	5	(62)
2021–2022	LA Giltinis	13	(35)
2023	San Diego Legion	4	(24)
- Correct as of 27 January 2024
International career
Years	Team	Apps	(Points)
2013–2014	Australia U20	9	(48)
- Correct as of 27 January 2024

Luke Burton (born 17 February 1994) is an Australian rugby union player who currently plays for the San Diego Legion in Major League Rugby (MLR). He previously played for the LA Giltinis in the MLR. He can play as either a fly-half or centre.

He previously played for the Western Force in Super Rugby, Biarritz Olympique in France, and represented the Australia Under-20 in the 2013 IRB Junior World Championship and 2014 IRB Junior World Championship World Cups.

== Early life ==
Burton was born and raised in Perth, Western Australia and represented his state at various age-group levels during his school days. His family immigrated to Australia from Cape Town, South Africa. Burton's family lineage sees both his cousins Jesse Kriel and Dan Kriel play professionally in South Africa and for the Springboks.

== Playing career ==
=== Australia U20 ===
In 2013, at 18 years old Burton was selected for Australia Under-20 where he represented his country at the 2013 IRB Junior World Championship held in France. In this tournament he played every game at Inside Centre and was the first choice goal kicker. Scoring tries against both New Zealand and Fiji in the tournament. Burton recorded a total tally of 31 points for Australia.

In 2014, Burton was selected the following year at the 2014 IRB Junior World Championship held in New Zealand. It was another successful tournament for Burton which saw him play every game at Inside centre and carry the goal kicking duties. Burton recorded a total of 51 points for the respective tournaments.

=== Super Rugby ===
In 2012, in his first year out of High School, Burton was invited to train with the Western Force full-time. After a successful 2013 IRB Junior World Championship he received offers from Australian Super Rugby teams, Burton signed his first Professional Super Rugby contract with the Western Force.

In May 2014, two months before Burtons second Junior World Cup, he made his Super Rugby Debut starting at Inside Centre for the Western Force against the Stormers in Newlands, Cape Town. He started again the following week at No. 12 against the Lions at NIB Stadium before returning to the Junior Wallabies Camp in preparation for the 2014 IRB Junior World Championship.

In 2015 at age 21, Burton had his breakout season. He entrenched himself as a regular starter and played in every Super Rugby game for the season and handed the goal kicking duties. Burton played 25 games for the Western Force starting at both Flyhalf and Inside Centre.

In 2017, Burton received offers from France and left the Western Force to pursue new challenges.

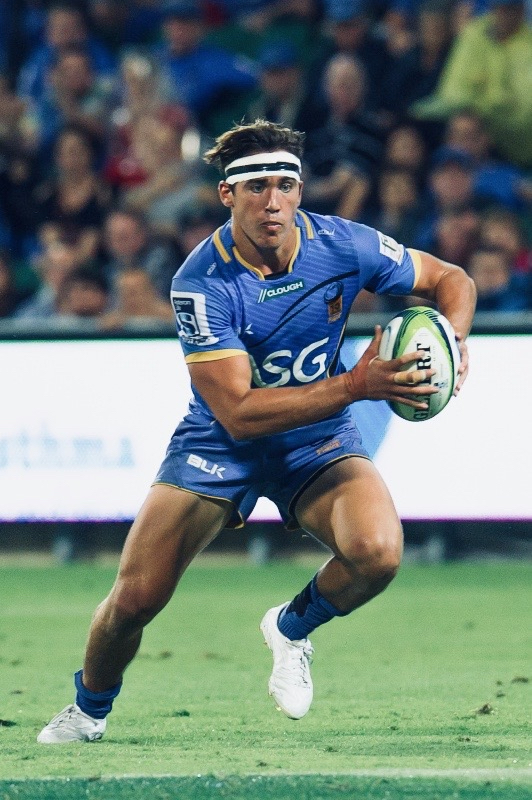
Western Force vs Hurricanes, 2015.

=== France ===
In May 2017, Burton signed and played for Biarritz Olympique under head coach Gonzalo Quesada which saw him adapt his game and use his attacking flair with northern hemisphere game management. Burton played 42 games in two seasons 2017-18 and 2018–19 at flyhalf for Biarritz Olympique. He steered Biarritz Olympique to a Quarter Final finish verse Grenoble in May 2018.

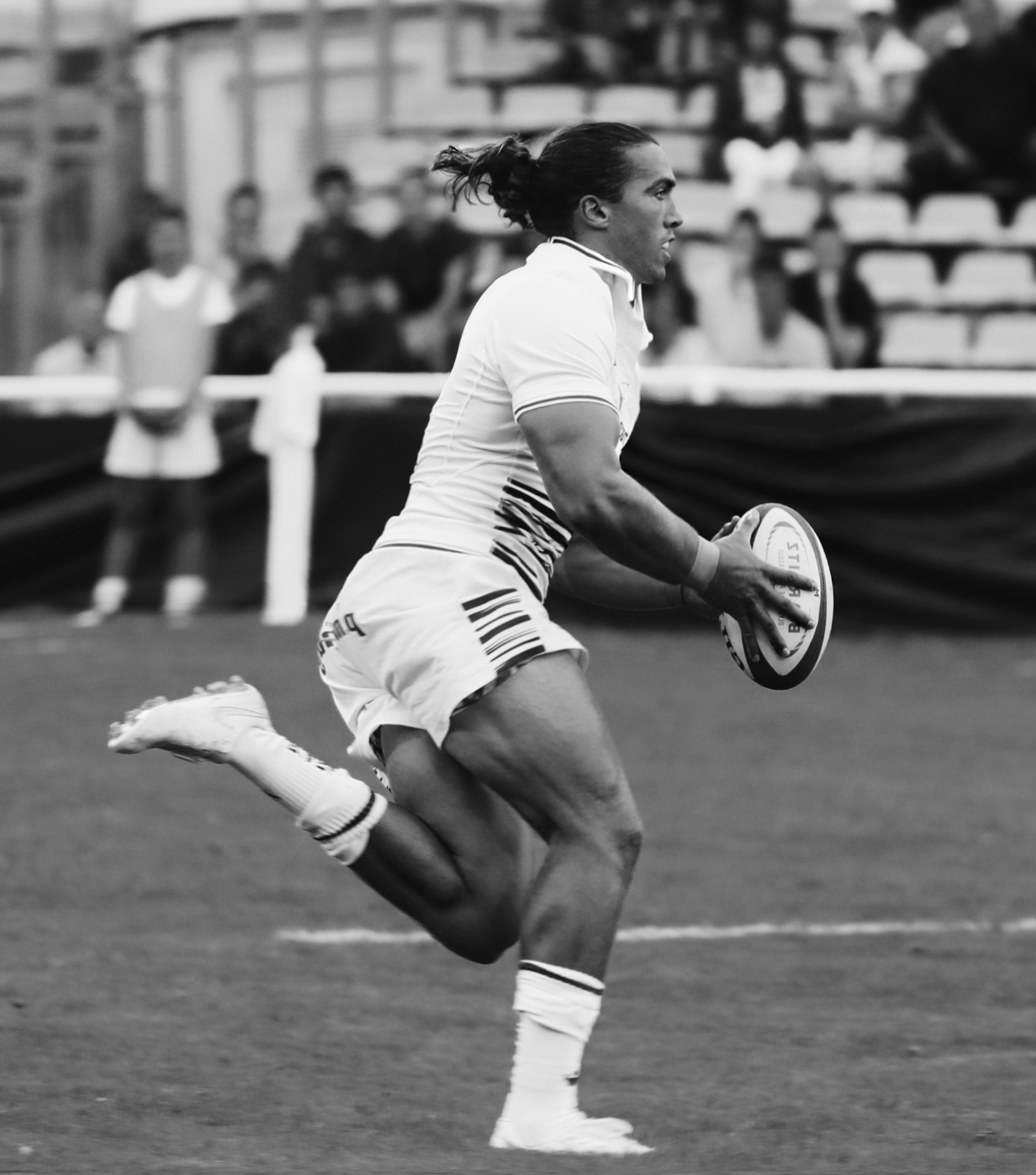
Biarritz Olympique Saison 2018–19.

=== Major League Rugby ===
In 2019, San Diego Legion signed Burton from Biarritz Olympique, one of many big signings for the club, such as All Black Ma’a Nonu, to boost their strength of winning the American shield. San Diego Legion were having a stellar season before COVID-19 cancelled the competition. Burton started every game at No. 10 and was the only San Diego Legion player to play every minute of every game. They were undefeated in their 5 games and dominated the competition with 21 tries, 161 points and 11 try assists for Burton.

== International ==
Burton was a part of the Australia Under-20 squad for the 2013 IRB Junior World Championship in France and for the 2014 IRB Junior World Championship in New Zealand.

== Playing Style ==
Burton is well known for possessing an X factor skillset and an attacking style of play. Developing his game in France saw him adapt a calculated kicking game and composed game management. Burton is also noted to be a strong defender.
