= John Hodgson (rugby union) =

British Lions & England international rugby union player

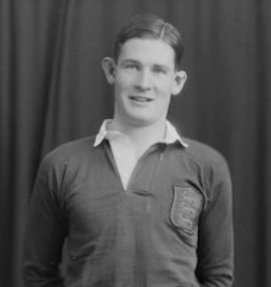
- Full name: John McDonald Hodgson
- Born: 13 February 1909 Gosforth, England
- Died: 21 April 1970 (aged 61)
- School: Hillbrow School; Rugby School
- Notable relative(s): Tom Berry (brother-in-law); Dan Kriel (great-grandson); Jesse Kriel (great-grandson)

Rugby union career
- Position: Wing-forward
International career
Years	Team	Apps	(Points)
1930	British Lions	2	(0)
1932–36	England	7	(0)

John McDonald Hodgson (13 February 1909 – 21 April 1970) was an English international rugby union player.

== Biography ==
Hodgson was born in Gosforth, Newcastle, and picked up rugby union during his years at Hillbrow School in Rugby, Warwickshire. After completing his secondary education at Rugby School, Hodgson played for Northern on his return to Gosforth and ascended to the club captaincy by age 19.

A back-rower, Hodgson toured New Zealand and Australia with the British Lions in 1930. He featured in 15 of the tour fixtures, including two of the Test matches against the All Blacks, in Dunedin and Auckland. On the journey home, Hodgson became so ill that he was said to have been close to death and as a result didn't play rugby for the rest of the year. He was capped seven times for England between 1932 and 1936, primarily as a wing-forward. He switched clubs from Northern to Leicester during his period with England.

Hodgson married a South African who he met while on a business trip and their great-grandson, Jesse Kriel, played for the Springboks. His Leicester teammate Tom Berry, also an England player, married John's sister Margaret.

== See also ==
- List of British & Irish Lions players
- List of England national rugby union players
