= Monkton Wood Academy =

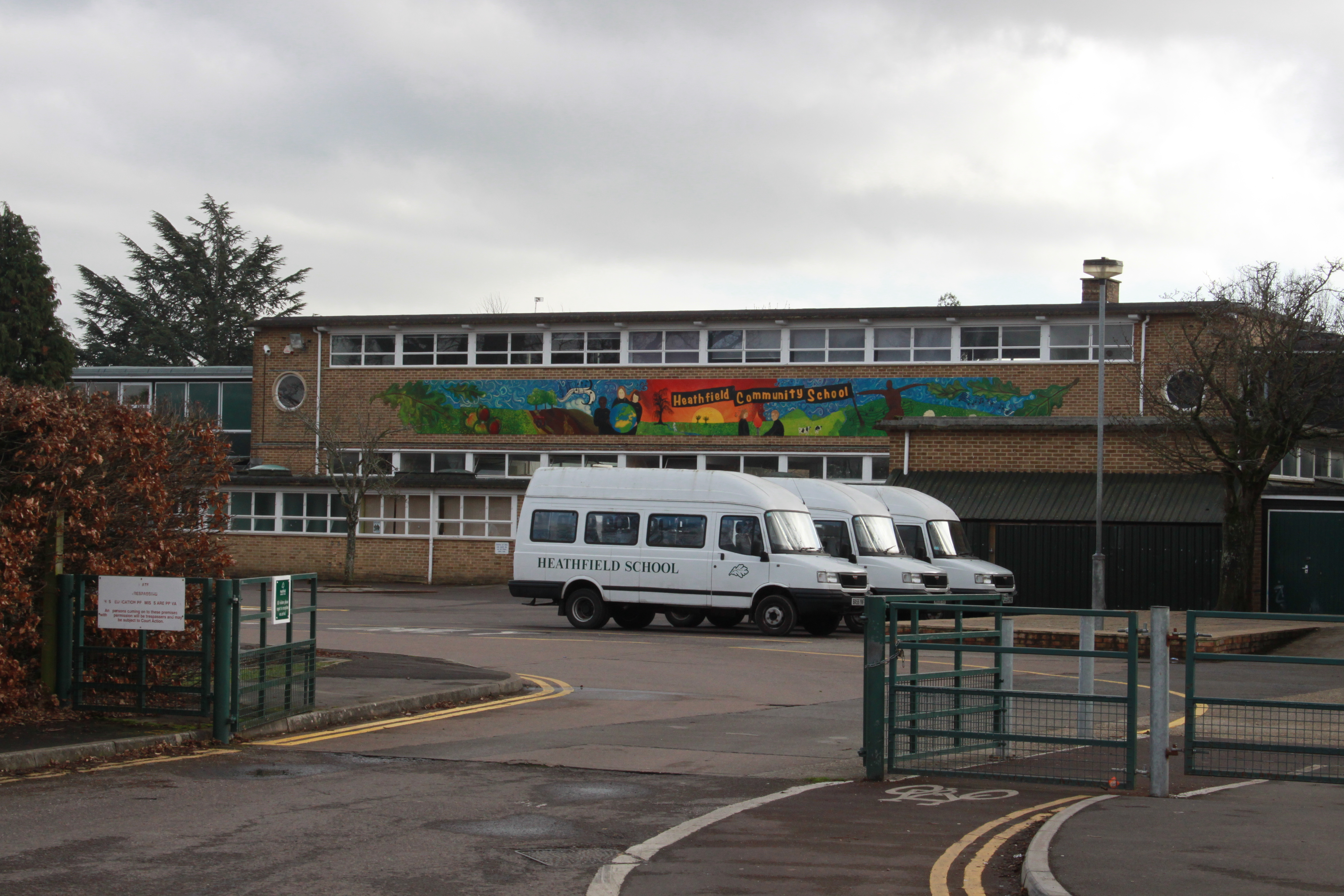

Location
- School Road; Monkton Heathfield; Taunton, Somerset, TA2 8PD; England; 51.036°N 3.062°W

Information
- Type: Academy (England and Wales)
- Established: 1978
- Principal: Hannah Jones
- Gender: Mixed
- Age: 11 to 18
- Enrollment: 1,393 pupils
- Website: https://monktonwoodacademy.clf.uk/

Monkton Wood Academy is an Academy (England and Wales) located at West Monkton in the outskirts of Taunton, England. It had 1,192 pupils aged 11 to 18, of which 78 were in the sixth form, in 2015, and has an Arts College specialist status. The headteacher is Hannah Jones. As of 1 December 2023, the school became Monkton Wood Academy under the Cabot Learning Federation

== History ==
West Monkton Secondary Modern School was built in 1956. In 1978, the school merged with Priory Boys' School to form Heathfield Community School. In 2023, it formed an academy under the Cabot Learning Federation to become Monkton Wood Academy.

Since then, new buildings have been added, such as; the Sports Hall in 1979 and the English Centre in 1991. In 1990, the school performed a version of Peace Child which gave rise to a partnership with Kathleen Tacchi-Morris. In 1999, the Tacchi-Morris Trust donated £1-million along with £2.1 million from the Arts Council to build the Tacchi-Morris Arts Centre. The school has an annual Christmas Carol Concert, which involves pupils from all years, staff and members of the community.

The headteacher of Heathfield was Elliot Furneaux until 2015 when Peter Hoare took over. Peter was then headteacher until July 2022 when he made the decision to resign due to health issues. OFSTED then appointed the Cabot Learning Federation to provide an interim headteacher and they provided Heathfield with Hannah Jones who was due to be in the post for the school year.

== Facilities ==
A new sand-based astro pitch was opened in 2003 and was funded partly through local businesses. The pitch is used both by the school and the local community with a local six-a-side league held there on Monday evenings.

The Tacchi-Morris Arts Centre is a theatre which is open to the community but is also used by the school for teaching and performing. Year 11 BTEC Musical Theatre, GCSE Dance, RSL Dance and RSL Drama all perform pieces on the stage which go towards their final GCSE grade. The arts centre is also used by the school to perform musical concerts; however the Christmas concert is performed in the sports hall due to high demand.

"The Space" is a 6th form facility based on the Heathfield School site offering a performing arts diploma. The first cohort of students started September 2009.

In September 2012, the school opened its new library and autism centre known as the Cedar Centre, costing £610,000. This allowed the conversion of the old library into a staff room and the old staff room into two new English classrooms. Somerset County Council considered Kingsmead School for the development but chose Heathfield as it "was a better option in terms of pupils travelling to the base".

In 2018, the school built a new performing arts block and a new arts/science block which opened in September 2018 at the time that the school took on the group of Year 7s.

In 2021, the school received their first OFSTED inspection since 2015, when they had their outstanding report, this was because there had been some complaints and the school was very overdue. The inspectors were in for two days and then finally marked the school as a requires improvement school, which is part of the reason that the Cabot Learning Federation were bought in to help.

In 2023, The Board Of Governor's started the process of turning Heathfield into an academy under the Cabot Learning Federation, this conversion will take full affect as of September 2023 and will mean that there are no Local Authority schools in Somerset.

== Cafe Paramo ==
Cafe Paramo allows pupils at the school learn business techniques by selling premium coffee and other merchandise. The project has been running since 2009. Through Cafe Paramo, the school has links to the Caxarumi co-operative in Ecuador and the Valdesian region of the Dominican Republic. The Caxarumi co-operative consists of 60 farmers in Loja. The proceeds of the project go directly to the farmers, the local communities and schools in the area. The money for the local schools funds the basics such as tables, chairs etc. In the Valdesia region it even helps a small orphanage. The project also is part of the year 8 'Multicultural Week'. As of 2023, Cafe Paramo is very unheard of at Heathfield as the member of staff who ran it- Wayne Davies- has now left teaching.

== Notable students ==
Some recent notable pupils include:

- Joel Conlon, rugby player
