= Joel Conlon =

- Born: 4 May 1994 (age 32) Taunton, England
- Height: 1.87 m (6 ft 2 in)
- Weight: 97 kg (15 st 4 lb)
- Occupation: Former professional rugby union player

Rugby union career
- Position(s): Flanker, Number 8
Senior career
Years	Team	Apps	(Points)
2012–2015	Exeter Chiefs	9	(0)
2015–2018	Saracens	17	(0)
International career
Years	Team	Apps	(Points)
2012	England U18	8	(15)
2013–2014	England U20	14	(25)

Joel Conlon (born 4 May 1994) is an English former rugby union player. A flanker, he played for Exeter Chiefs and Saracens and represented England at youth level.

== Career ==
Conlon attended Trinity Church of England School and then Heathfield Community School.

A product of the Exeter Chiefs Academy, Conlon signed his first professional contract with Exeter on 25 May 2012. Later that year on 11 November 2012 he made his professional debut for Exeter against London Welsh RFC in the LV Cup. He played in the 2014–15 LV Cup final which Exeter lost against Saracens.

Conlon was called up to the England under 20 squad in January 2013. He played for the side that won the 2013 Six Nations Under 20s Championship. Later that year Conlon was a member of the England squad that won the 2013 IRB Junior World Championship.

Conlon was part of the team that were runners up during the 2014 Six Nations Under 20s Championship and scored a try against Ireland. Later that year he was included in the squad for the 2014 IRB Junior World Championship and scored the winning try in the final as England beat South Africa 21–20 at Eden Park to retain the title.

In May 2015 it was confirmed that Conlon would leave Exeter to join Saracens. On 8 November 2018 his retirement from rugby was announced due to a neck injury.

== Honours ==
Exeter Chiefs

- Anglo-Welsh Cup runner-up: 2014–15

England U20

- World Rugby Junior World Championship: 2013, 2014
- Six Nations Under 20s Championship: 2013
