= Dan Kriel =

South African rugby union player

- Full name: Daniel David Kriel
- Born: 15 February 1994 (age 32) Pietermaritzburg, South Africa
- Height: 1.93 m (6 ft 4 in)
- Weight: 103 kg (16 st 3 lb; 227 lb)
- School: Maritzburg College, Pietermaritzburg
- University: University of Pretoria
- Notable relative(s): Jesse Kriel (twin brother); John Hodgson (great-grandfather)

Rugby union career
- Position: Centre / Winger
- Current team: Seattle Seawolves
Youth career
- 2010: Sharks
- 2013–2015: Blue Bulls
Amateur team(s)
Years	Team	Apps	(Points)
2015–2016	UP Tuks	8	(25)
Senior career
Years	Team	Apps	(Points)
2015–2016	Blue Bulls	10	(0)
2016	Blue Bulls XV	5	(5)
2016	Bulls	3	(0)
2017–2019	Stormers	17	(0)
2017–2019	Western Province	28	(0)
2020–2021	Lions	14	(15)
2020–2021	Golden Lions	13	(0)
2022–	Seattle Seawolves	48	(55)
- Correct as of 19 June 2022
International career
Years	Team	Apps	(Points)
2014	South Africa Under-20	4	(0)
- Correct as of 18 April 2018

Daniel David Kriel (born 15 February 1994) is a South African professional who plays for the Seattle Seawolves in Major League Rugby (MLR). His regular position is centre. Kriel is the twin brother of professional rugby player Jesse Kriel.

== Career ==
=== Schools rugby (2010–12) ===
Kriel attended Maritzburg College in Pietermaritzburg and was selected to represent KwaZulu-Natal at the Under-16 Grant Khomo Week competition in 2010. He missed out on selection for their Under-18 Craven Week two years later after suffering a dislocated shoulder prior to the competition.

=== Blue Bulls (2013) ===
After high school, Kriel moved to Pretoria to join the Blue Bulls Academy. He was the first-choice outside centre for the Blue Bulls U19 side in the 2013 Under-19 Provincial Championship, starting eleven of their fourteen matches in the competition. He scored six tries for the Blue Bulls during the competition, which included a brace in their 46–16 victory over Western Province U19. The Blue Bulls topped the log, winning all twelve of their matches during the competition. Kriel started both their 37–21 defeat of Leopards U19 in the semi-final and the final, where the Blue Bulls won 35–23 to win the title and go through the entire competition undefeated.

=== Blue Bulls / South Africa Under-20 (2014) ===
In 2014, Kriel was called up to the South African Under-20 team that participated at the 2014 IRB Junior World Championship in New Zealand. He didn't play in South Africa's first match, a 61–5 victory over Scotland, but he started their second match of the competition, helping South Africa to a 33–24 victory over hosts New Zealand, as well as their final pool match which saw them beat Samoa 21–8 to finish top of their pool. Kriel was named on the bench as South Africa once again met New Zealand in the semi-finals and helped his side to a 32–25 win to qualify for their second ever final. Kriel started the final on the right wing for South Africa as they the match 20–21 to England to finish the competition in second spot.

Kriel made thirteen appearances for the Blue Bulls U21s during the 2014 Under-21 Provincial Championship. For the second year running, he scored two tries in a match against Western Province in a 44–30 win and also got a try in each of their matches against the Border U21s. The Blue Bulls U21s finished second on the log to Western Province, but – after beating the Golden Lions U21s 23–19 in the semi-final – won the final against Western Province in Cape Town, running out 20–10 winners.

=== Varsity, Vodacom and Currie Cup (2015) ===
Kriel started the 2015 season by representing university side UP Tuks in the 2015 Varsity Cup competition. He scored tries in four different matches as UP Tuks topped the log after the round robin stage. He scored his fifth try of the competition in their semi-final match against NWU Pukke, but it wasn't enough to prevent the team from Potchefstroom winning the match 29–28 to progress to the final, eliminating UP Tuks. At the conclusion of the competition, Kriel was initially named in a Varsity Cup Dream Team to play a friendly against the South African Under-20s, but was subsequently withdrawn from the squad.

Instead, he was included in the Blue Bulls squad for the 2015 Vodacom Cup competition. He made his domestic first class debut in Windhoek, starting the Blue Bulls' 44–0 victory over Namibian side Welwitschias. He also started a further four matches for the Blue Bulls, which included their quarter final victory over a Free State XV and their 6–10 defeat to Western Province in the semi-final.

Kriel played two matches for the Blue Bulls U21s in the 2015 Under-21 Provincial Championship Group A before being promoted to the senior squad for the 2015 Currie Cup Premier Division. He was named on the bench for their Round Three match against Western Province.

=== Stormers / Western Province ===
At the start of 2017, Kriel moved to Cape Town, where he joined the Stormers Super Rugby team and the Western Province Currie Cup team.

== Personal ==
Kriel is married to Candice and has one daughter and one son.

Kriel is the twin brother of Jesse Kriel, both brothers are professional South African rugby players and the great-grandson of John Hodgson (1909-1970), who played 15 games for the British and Irish Lions in the 1930s.
