= Vincent Mallet =

- Born: Vincent Mallet; 8 February 1993 (age 33)
- Height: 1.81 m (5 ft 11 in)
- Weight: 86 kg (13 st 8 lb)

Rugby union career
- Position: Fly-half
Senior career
Years	Team	Apps	(Points)
2012-15	Stade Français	14	(15)
2015-16	SC Albi	5	(6)
2016-18	RC Massy	12	(5)
2018-	RC Suresnes	24	(123)
- Correct as of 21 December 2019
International career
Years	Team	Apps	(Points)
2013	France U20	8	(37)

Vincent Mallet (born 8 February 1993) is a French rugby union player. He plays at fly-half for Stade Français in the Top 14.
