= Giacomo De Santis =

- Born: 15 March 1995 (age 31) Roma, Italy
- Height: 1.85 m (6 ft 1 in)
- Weight: 95 kg (209 lb; 14 st 13 lb)

Rugby union career
- Position: Centre
- Current team: Colorno
Youth career
- Unione Rugby Capitolina
Senior career
Years	Team	Apps	(Points)
2013–2014	Capitolina	1	(0)
2014–2021	Calvisano	106	(85)
2021−2023	Colorno	26	(20)
- Correct as of 8 November 2020
International career
Years	Team	Apps	(Points)
2014–2015	Italy Under 20	19	(3)
2017	Emerging Italy	2	(5)
- Correct as of 8 November 2020

Giacomo De Santis (born 15 March 1995 in Rome) is an Italian rugby union player. His usual position is as a Centre and he played for Colorno in Top10 from 2021 to 2023.

In 2014 and 2015 De Santis was named in the Italy Under 20 squad and in 2017 he was also named in the Emerging Italy squad for the annual World Rugby Nations Cup.
