= Kathleen Tacchi-Morris =

English dancer and peace activist (1899–1993)

Kathleen Tacchi-Morris (24 January 1899 – 12 May 1993) was the founder of Women for World Disarmament (WFWD). Tacchi-Morris was also a dancer who appeared in several silent movies, including Men Are Not Gods (1936). Her father was the inventor Percy George Tacchi.

Kathleen was born on 24 January 1899 Johannesburg, South Africa and died in North Curry, Somerset on 12 May 1993. Shortly after her birth she and her family returned to England.

Kathleen married Walter A Stagg in December 1936, in Kensington, London. After the end of her first marriage, she married Richard R Morris in March 1945 in Exeter, Devon.

In 1999 the Tacchi-Morris trust donated £1 million together with a £2.1 million grant from the Arts Council to create the Tacchi-Morris Arts Centre.

== See also ==
- List of peace activists
