= George Catchpole =

- Born: George Joseph Catchpole; 22 January 1994 (age 32) Norwich, England
- Height: 1.85 m (6 ft 1 in)
- Weight: 99 kg (15 st 8 lb)

Rugby union career
- Position: Centre
Senior career
Years	Team	Apps	(Points)
2013–18	Leicester Tigers	17	(10)
2013–14	Nottingham	16	(10)
2014–16	Doncaster	11	(10)

George Joseph Catchpole (born 22 January 1994) is an English retired professional rugby union player. During his career he played 17 times for Leicester Tigers between 2013 and 2018, as well as appearing for Nottingham and Doncaster.

Catchpole was born in Norwich, and made his senior debut for Leicester as a 19-year-old in the Anglo-Welsh Cup against Ospreys. In 2014-15 he was voted as Players' Young Player of the season at Leicester but injury and illness curtailed his career forcing him to retire at only 24.
