= Harry Rudkin =

English rugby union player

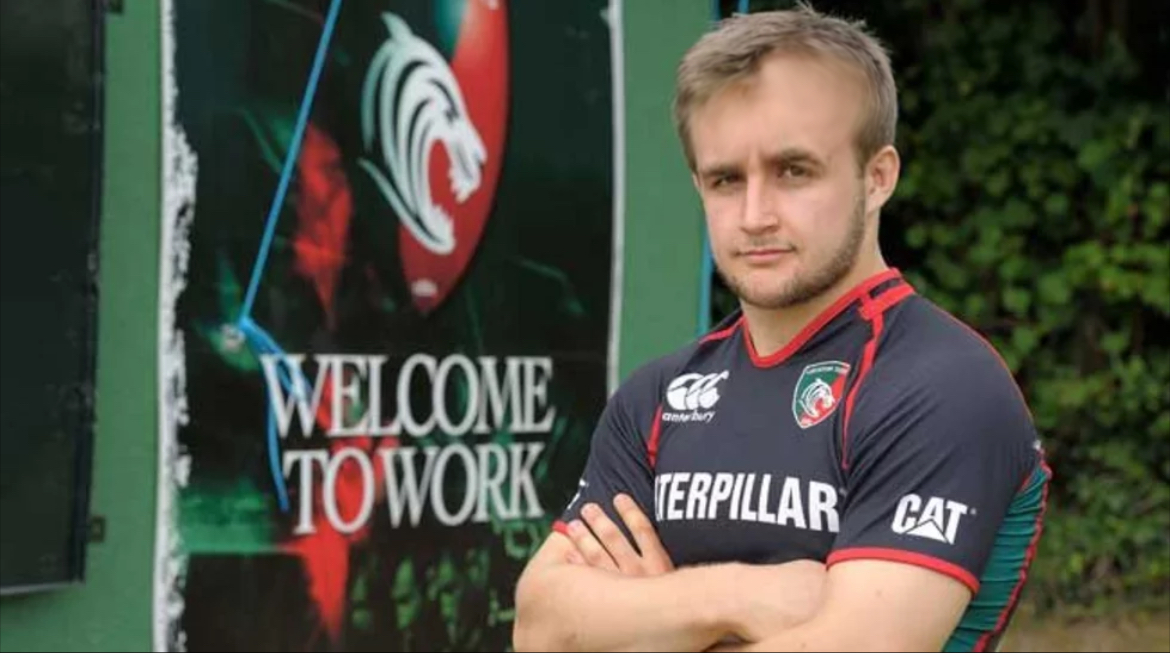
- Born: Harry Rudkin; 16 June 1994 (age 32) Sutton-in-Ashfield, England
- Height: 1.84 m (6 ft 0 in)
- Weight: 100 kg (15 st 10 lb)

Rugby union career
- Position: Prop (rugby union)
Senior career
Years	Team	Apps	(Points)
2010–2014	Leicester Tigers	0	(0)
2014–2015	→ Doncaster R.L.F.C.		
International career
Years	Team	Apps	(Points)
2014	England U20	1	

Harry Rudkin (born 16 June 1994) is an English retired rugby union player who played for Leicester Tigers in the Aviva Premiership.

== Club career ==
Rudkin played club rugby at Derby RFC before moving to Leicester Tigers' academy in 2010.

== International career ==
Rudkin made his England Under-20s debut and only international appearance against Scotland U20s, coming from the bench in the 2014 Six Nations Under 20s Championship.
