= James Benjamin =

- Born: James Benjamin; 21 February 1994 (age 32) Newport, Wales
- Height: 182 cm (6 ft 0 in)
- Weight: 102 kg (16 st 1 lb)
- School: Bassaleg School
- University: Coleg Gwent

Rugby union career
- Position(s): Hooker; Openside Flanker; Number 8
- Current team: Dragons
Senior career
Years	Team	Apps	(Points)
2013–	Dragons	85	(35)
2021	→ Cornish Pirates	5	(5)
2022	→ Hartpury	1	(5)
- Correct as of 11:25, 6 February 2024 (UTC)
International career
Years	Team	Apps	(Points)
2013–2014	Wales U20	17	(35)
- Correct as of 30 November 2022
National sevens team
Years	Team		Comps
2015–2020	Wales		10

James Benjamin (born 21 February 1994) is a Welsh rugby union player who plays for the Dragons regional team as a hooker. He is a Wales U20 and Wales 7s international.

== Club career ==
Benjamin began his career in the back row, capable of playing as a flanker or number 8. A member of the Dragons academy, Benjamin also played for feeder clubs Cross Keys RFC and Bedwas RFC. Benjamin made his competitive debut for the Dragons in 2013, against the Wasps.

In 2020, Benjamin began a conversion from back row to hooker. He spent time on loan with Cornish Pirates and Hartpury University R.F.C. to gain experience in the position. He made his first competitive start for the Dragons at hooker on 27 November 2022 against the Lions.

== International career ==
Benjamin represented Wales U20 for two seasons, playing in the Six Nations Under 20s Championship and World Rugby Under 20 Championship.

Benjamin has also featured for Wales Sevens, and was included in the squad for the 2018 Commonwealth Games.
