= Jesse Kriel =

South African rugby union player

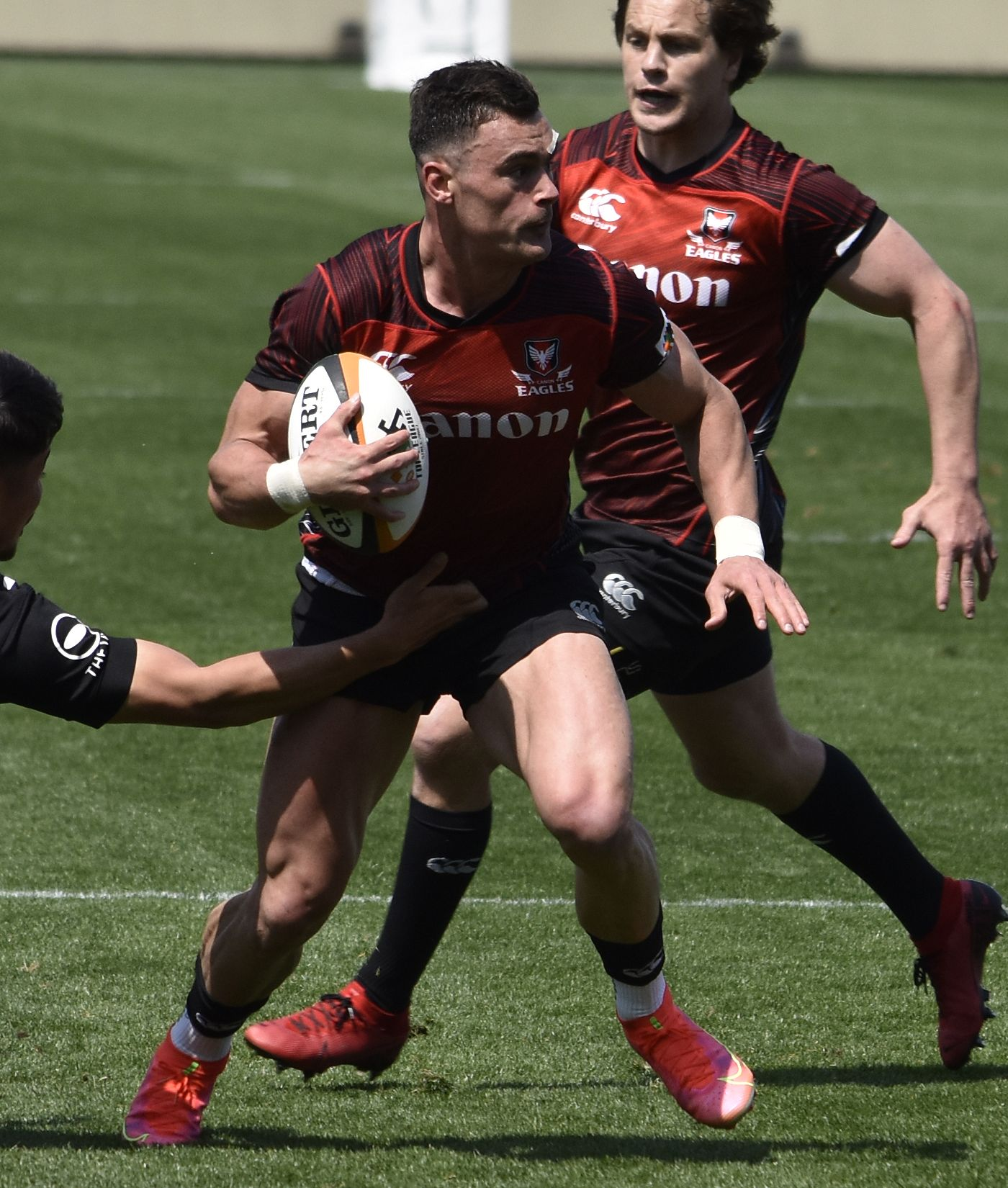
- Kriel playing in 2021
- Full name: Jesse André Kriel
- Born: 15 February 1994 (age 32) Pietermaritzburg, South Africa
- Height: 1.86 m (6 ft 1 in)
- Weight: 95 kg (209 lb; 14 st 13 lb)
- School: Maritzburg College
- University: University of Pretoria
- Notable relative(s): Dan Kriel (twin brother); John Hodgson (great-grandfather)

Rugby union career
- Position: Utility back
- Current team: Canon Eagles
Youth career
- 2012: Sharks
- 2013–2015: Blue Bulls
Amateur team(s)
Years	Team	Apps	(Points)
2013	UP Tuks	0	(0)
Senior career
Years	Team	Apps	(Points)
2014–2018	Blue Bulls	17	(25)
2014–2019	Bulls	70	(95)
2015–2016	NTT DoCoMo Red Hurricanes	9	(20)
2020–	Canon Eagles	82	(180)
- Correct as of 10 July 2022
International career
Years	Team	Apps	(Points)
2012	South Africa Schools	2	(0)
2013–2014	South Africa Under-20	9	(35)
2015	Springboks (Note: In addition to playing in test matches, Kriel featured in a match against a World XV in Cape Town in July 2015. This match has an equivalent status to international tour matches, but was played on home soil. He also played for a Springbok XV that played against the Barbarians in London in November 2016. While this match was a first class match recognised by World Rugby, the South African Rugby Union did not award this match tour match status and no caps were awarded to players that appeared in this match.)	1	(0)
2015–present	South Africa	94	(120)
2016	Springbok XV	1	(0)
- Correct as of 27 September 2026
Medal record
Men's Rugby union
Representing South Africa
Rugby World Cup
Bronze medal – third place	2015 England	Squad
Gold medal – first place	2019 Japan	Squad
Gold medal – first place	2023 France	Squad

Jesse André Kriel (born 15 February 1994) is a South African professional rugby union player who currently plays for the Canon Eagles in the Japanese Top League and South Africa national rugby team. His regular playing position is as a utility back but can also play centre, wing or fullback. Kriel was part of the national team who won the 2019 Rugby World Cup and 2023 Rugby World Cup, where he played in all the games of the latter.

== Career ==
=== Youth ===
As a scholar at Maritzburg College, Kriel was selected in the Sharks squad for the Under–18 Craven Week tournament, where his performance earned him an inclusion in the South African Schools side in 2012. He started in matches against France, and England and was an unused substitute against Wales in the three-match series played in August 2012.

After finishing school, Kriel – along with twin brother Dan – made the move to Pretoria to join the Blue Bulls prior to the 2013 season.

Despite not initially being named in the South Africa Under-20 squad for the 2013 IRB Junior World Championship, a hamstring injury suffered by Sergeal Petersen led to Kriel's inclusion into the squad.

Kriel appeared as a substitute in their first match of the competition and scored two tries in a comprehensive 97–0 victory over the United States. Further substitute appearances followed against England and France. He was an unused substitute in their semi-final match against Wales, before making his first start of the competition in the third-placed play-off match against New Zealand.

For the remainder of 2013, Kriel played more youth rugby for the Blue Bulls, scoring 42 points in ten matches to help the Blue Bulls U19 win the 2013 Under-19 Provincial Championship competition and also making three appearances for the Blue Bulls U21 side.

Kriel was included in the South Africa Under-20 side for the 2014 IRB Junior World Championship, and also named one of two vice-captains for the tournament.

=== Senior career ===
In 2014, Kriel was included in the Bulls training squad prior to the 2014 Super Rugby season, but failed to make any matchday squads, instead playing for the Blue Bulls in the 2014 Vodacom Cup competition. His first class debut came on 8 March 2014 against Griquas in Pretoria and he scored his first senior try just a week later, in their match against the Pumas.

In June 2015, he extended his contract at the Bulls until October 2018, which was extended even more until October 2019 just two months later following Kriel's call-up to the South Africa squad.

=== South Africa ===
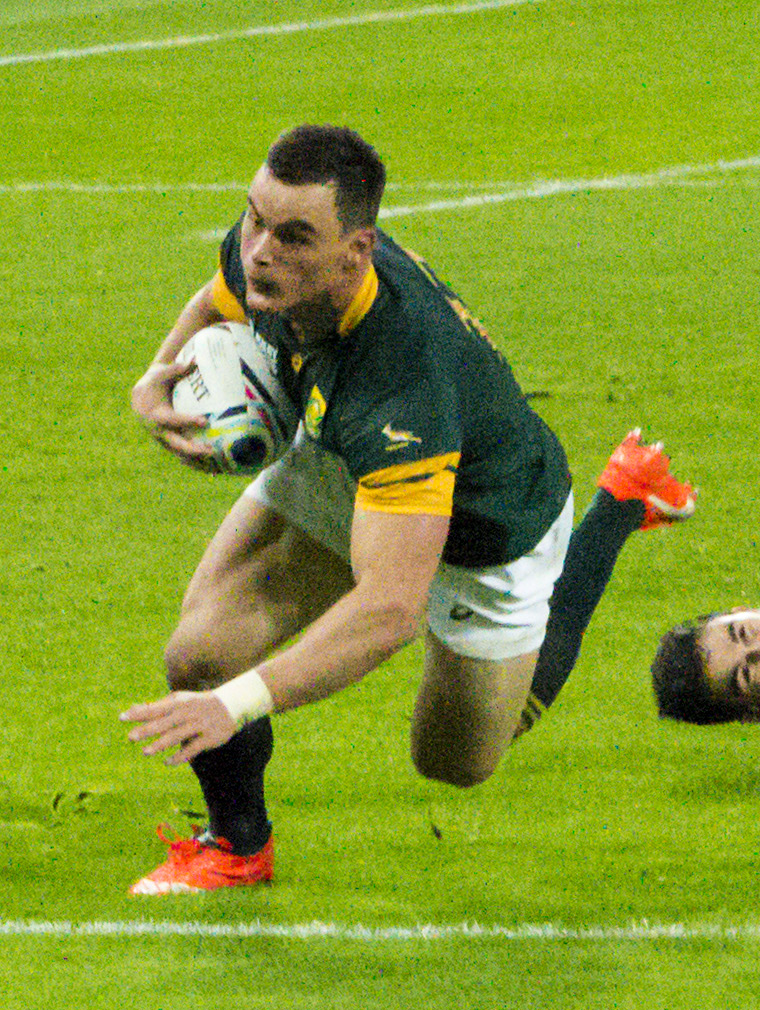
Kriel scoring a try for South Africa during the 2015 Rugby World Cup

In June 2015, Kriel was named in an extended South Africa squad prior to the 2015 Rugby Championship. He started for South Africa in a warm-up match against a World XV, helping them to a 46–10 win. He was named in the squad for their opening Rugby Championship match against Australia and was named as the starting centre for the match to become Springbok Number 867. Not only was this match Kriel's test debut, but he also scored his first test try in the 44th minute of the match. However, he ended the match on the losing side, with a late Tevita Kuridrani try securing a 24–20 victory for Australia.

Kriel was named in South Africa's squad for the 2019 Rugby World Cup. However he had to withdraw through injury in the pool stage and was replaced by Damian Willemse. South Africa went on to win the tournament, defeating England in the final.

Wife

Lindy Jacobs

== Honours ==
South Africa

- 2025 Rugby Championship winner

== International statistics ==
=== Test Match record ===
As of 15 November 2026

Against	P	W	D	L	Tri	Pts	%Won
Argentina	17	14	0	3	2	10	82.35
Australia	13	7	2	4	2	10	53.85
England	8	5	0	3	2	10	62.5
France	8	6	0	2	3	15	75
Georgia	1	1	0	0	0	0	100
Ireland	7	2	0	5	0	0	28.57
Italy	3	3	0	0	1	5	100
Japan	3	2	0	1	1	5	66.67
New Zealand	18	7	1	10	4	20	38.89
Samoa	1	1	0	0	0	0	100
Scotland	5	5	0	0	2	10	100
Tonga	1	1	0	0	1	5	100
United States	1	1	0	0	1	5	100
Wales	10	6	0	4	6	30	60
Total	96	61	3	32	25	125	63.54

P = Games Played, W = Games Won, D = Games Drawn, L = Games Lost, Tri = Tries Scored, Pts = Points Scored

=== International tries ===
As of 5 September 2025

Try	Opposing team	Location	Venue	Competition	Date	Result	Score
1	Australia	Brisbane, Australia	Lang Park	2015 Rugby Championship	18 July 2015	Loss	24–20
2	New Zealand	Johannesburg, South Africa	Ellis Park Stadium	2015 Rugby Championship	25 July 2015	Loss	20–27
3	United States	London, England	Olympic Stadium	2015 Rugby World Cup Pool B	7 October 2015	Win	64–0
4	France	Pretoria, South Africa	Loftus Versfeld Stadium	2017 France tour of South Africa	10 June 2017	Win	37–14
5	France	Johannesburg, South Africa	Ellis Park Stadium	2017 France tour of South Africa	24 June 2017	Win	35–12
6	Australia	Perth, Australia	Perth Oval	2017 Rugby Championship	9 September 2017	Draw	23–23
7	France	Saint-Denis, France	Stade de France	2017 end-of-year tests	18 November 2017	Win	17–18
8	Wales	Cardiff, Wales	Millennium Stadium	2017 end-of-year tests	2 December 2017	Loss	24–22
9	England	Cape Town, South Africa	Newlands Stadium	2018 England tour of South Africa	23 June 2018	Loss	10–25
10	New Zealand	Pretoria, South Africa	Loftus Versfeld Stadium	2018 Rugby Championship	6 October 2018	Loss	30–32
11	Scotland	Edinburgh, Scotland	Murrayfield Stadium	2018 end-of-year tests	17 November 2018	Win	20–26
12	Wales	Cardiff, Wales	Millennium Stadium	2018 end-of-year tests	24 November 2018	Loss	20–11
13	Wales	Cardiff, Wales	Millennium Stadium	2023 Rugby World Cup warm-up matches	19 August 2023	Win	16–52
14	Wales	Cardiff, Wales	Millennium Stadium	2023 Rugby World Cup warm-up matches	19 August 2023	Win	16–52
15	Tonga	Marseille, France	Stade Vélodrome	2023 Rugby World Cup Pool B	1 October 2023	Win	49–18
16	Wales	London, England	Twickenham Stadium	2024 mid-year tests	22 June 2024	Win	41–13
17	Argentina	Santiago del Estero, Argentina	Estadio Único Madre de Ciudades	2024 Rugby Championship	21 September 2024	Loss	29–28
18	Argentina	Mbombela, South Africa	Mbombela Stadium	2024 Rugby Championship	28 September 2024	Win	48–7
19	Italy	Pretoria, South Africa	Loftus Versfeld Stadium	2025 Italy tour of South Africa	5 July 2025	Win	42–24
20	Japan	London, England	Wembley Stadium	2025 end-of-year tests	1 November 2025	Win	7–61
21	England	Johannesburg, South Africa	Ellis Park Stadium	2026 Nations Championship	4 July 2026	Win	45–21
22	Scotland	Pretoria, South Africa	Loftus Versfeld Stadium	2026 Nations Championship	11 July 2026	Win	42–28
23	Wales	Durban, South Africa	Kings Park Stadium	2026 Nations Championship	18 July 2026	Win	43–0
24	New Zealand	Cape Town, South Africa	Cape Town Stadium	2026 New Zealand tour of South Africa	29 August 2026	Win	33–26
25	New Zealand	Johannesburg, South Africa	FNB Stadium	2026 New Zealand tour of South Africa	5 September 2026	Win	29–24

== Personal life ==
Kriel is the twin brother of Dan Kriel, both being professional South African rugby players and the great-grandson of John Hodgson (1909-1970), who played 15 games for the British and Irish Lions in the 1930s. He is a fluent Zulu speaker.
