= Ben O'Keefe =

English rugby league footballer

Personal information
- Full name: Ben O'Keefe
- Born: 23 May 2002 (age 24) Rochdale, Greater Manchester, England

Playing information
- Position: Centre, Wing
Club
Years	Team	Pld	T	G	FG	P
2022	Wigan Warriors	1	1	4	0	12
2022(loan)	→ Rochdale Hornets	8	10	7	0	54
2023	Rochdale Hornets	14	5	2	0	24
2024–	Oldham	45	23	4	0	100
	Total	68	39	17	0	190
- Source: As of 28 September 2026

Ben O'Keefe is a professional rugby league footballer who plays as a centre or winger for Oldham in the RFL Championship.

== Personal ==
Ben is the son of former Rochdale Hornets player, Paul O'Keefe.

== Playing career ==
=== Wigan Warriors ===
In 2022 O'Keefe made his Super League début for the Warriors against Hull Kingston Rovers.

=== Rochdale Hornets ===
He has spent time on loan from Wigan at the Rochdale Hornets in League 1, and made it a permanent move for the 2023 season.

=== Oldham R.L.F.C. ===
On 11 October 2023, it was reported that he had signed for Oldham R.L.F.C. in the RFL League 1 on a two-year deal.
