= Bastien Duhalde =

French professional rugby union player

- Born: Bastien Duhalde; 4 January 1993 (age 33)
- Height: 1.78 m (5 ft 10 in)
- Weight: 83 kg (13 st 1 lb)
- Notable relative: Sandra de Resende

Rugby union career
- Position: Scrum-half
Senior career
| Years | Team | Apps | (Points) |
| 2013- | Bayonne | 7 | (0) |
- Correct as of 24 January 2015
International career
| Years | Team | Apps | (Points) |
| 2013 | France U20 | 4 | (5) |

Bastien Duhalde is a French professional rugby union player. He plays at scrum-half for Bayonne in the Top 14.
