= Hillbrow School =

Hillbrow School was an English boys' preparatory school established in 1859 in the Midland town of Rugby. The founder was John William Joseph Vecquerary, a Prussian by birth, who had been recently recruited as a modern languages master at Rugby School, to which it was a feeder school, although he remained in post at Rugby. In 1870 the school moved to a purpose-built building on Barby Road.

The name Hillbrow, taken from the name of the building erected to house the school, was in use by the time of his successor, Thomas Bainbridge Eden, who according to Duncan Grant, one of its most famous pupils, ran "a Spartan institution with only about forty pupils". Eden was asked to leave as head in 1908 following a scandal about his sexual interest in his pupils.

== Twentieth century ==
In 1917, during the First World War the school moved to Overslade House, also in Rugby, and in 1922 the school was taken over by W.S. Dixon. In 1940 a landmine, or perhaps two, exploded some way from Overslade, and blew out all the windows. The school was thereafter evacuated to Featherstone Castle in Northumberland. George Bennett took over as headmaster in 1953, but was quickly succeeded by D.N. Clark-Lowes. In 1961 the school amalgamated with St Nicholas's School and moved to their premises at Ridley Hall, Northumberland. In 1962 D.N. Clark-Lowes resigned, and the name Hillbrow ceased to be used. St Nicholas's closed a few years later.

== Notable pupils ==
- Rupert Brooke (1887-1915), poet
- Duncan Grant (1885-1978), artist
- Robert Graves (1895-1985), poet and writer
- James Strachey (1887-1967), psychoanalyst, and translator and editor of the works of Sigmund Freud
