= 2017 Americas Rugby Championship =

Rugby union competition for national teams

- Date: 4 February – 4 March 2017
- Countries: Argentina XV; Brazil; Canada; Chile; United States; Uruguay

Final positions
- Champions: United States (1st title)

Tournament statistics
- Matches played: 15
- Tries scored: 100 (6.67 per match)
- Attendance: 54,216 (3,614 per match)
- Top scorer(s): (United States) Ben Cima (43) (Brazil) Moisés Duque (43)
- Most tries: (Argentina) Sebastián Cancelliere (5) (Canada) Taylor Paris (5)

The 2017 Americas Rugby Championship was the second series of the Americas Rugby Championship (sometimes informally called the "Americas Six Nations", a reference to Europe's Six Nations Championship), which is the top elite tournament for the Americas nations. It was contested by Argentina XV (Argentina's secondary national team), Canada, United States, Uruguay, Brazil, and Chile. All matches were full international test matches with caps awarded, except those involving Argentina XV.

== Participants ==
| Nation | Stadium | | | Head coach | Captain(s) |
| Nation | Home stadium | Capacity | City | Head coach | Captain(s) |
|---|---|---|---|---|---|
| Argentina XV | Estadio Municipal | 10,000 | Comodoro Rivadavia | (Argentina) Felipe Contepomi | Lautaro Bavaro; Juan Cappiello |
| Argentina XV | Estadio Villa Mitre | 6,000 | Bahía Blanca | (Argentina) Felipe Contepomi | Lautaro Bavaro; Juan Cappiello |
| Argentina XV | Estadio Agustín Pichot | 1,000 | Ushuaia | (Argentina) Felipe Contepomi | Lautaro Bavaro; Juan Cappiello |
| Brazil | Pacaembu Stadium | 37,730 | São Paulo | (Argentina) Rodolfo Ambrosio | Nick Smith |
| Canada | Swangard Stadium | 5,288 | Burnaby | (New Zealand) Mark Anscombe | Gordon McRorie; Ray Barkwill |
| Canada | Westhills Stadium | 1,718 | Langford | (New Zealand) Mark Anscombe | Gordon McRorie; Ray Barkwill |
| Chile | Estadio CAP | 10,500 | Talcahuano | (France) Bernard Charreyre | Claudio Zamorano; Benjamín Soto; José Ignacio Larenas; Manuel Gurruchaga |
| Chile | Pista Atlética San Carlos de Apoquindo | 3,000 | Santiago | (France) Bernard Charreyre | Claudio Zamorano; Benjamín Soto; José Ignacio Larenas; Manuel Gurruchaga |
| United States | Dell Diamond | 11,631 | Round Rock | (New Zealand) John Mitchell | Blaine Scully; James Hilterbrand; Todd Clever; Nate Augspurger |
| United States | Toyota Field | 8,296 | San Antonio | (New Zealand) John Mitchell | Blaine Scully; James Hilterbrand; Todd Clever; Nate Augspurger |
| Uruguay | Estadio Domingo Burgueño | 22,000 | Maldonado | (Argentina) Esteban Meneses | Alejandro Nieto; Juan Manuel Gaminara |
| Uruguay | Estadio Charrúa | 14,000 | Montevideo | (Argentina) Esteban Meneses | Alejandro Nieto; Juan Manuel Gaminara |

== Table ==
| Pos | Nation (rank) | Games | | | | Points | | | Tries | Bonus points | | Table points |
| Pos | Nation (rank) | Played | Won | Drawn | Lost | For | Against | Diff | Tries | 4 tries | 7 Pts loss | Table points |
|---|---|---|---|---|---|---|---|---|---|---|---|---|
| 1 | United States (17) | 5 | 4 | 1 | 0 | 215 | 96 | +119 | 29 | 4 | 0 | 22 |
| 2 | Argentina XV (NA) | 5 | 4 | 1 | 0 | 228 | 62 | +166 | 32 | 3 | 0 | 21 |
| 3 | Uruguay (21) | 5 | 3 | 0 | 2 | 120 | 125 | –5 | 16 | 2 | 1 | 15 |
| 4 | Brazil (36) | 5 | 2 | 0 | 3 | 63 | 179 | –116 | 6 | 0 | 0 | 8 |
| 5 | Canada (18) | 5 | 1 | 0 | 4 | 112 | 127 | –15 | 13 | 2 | 2 | 8 |
| 6 | Chile (29) | 5 | 0 | 0 | 5 | 51 | 200 | –149 | 4 | 0 | 0 | 0 |
Points are awarded to the teams as follows: Win - 4 points Draw - 2 points 4 or more tries - 1 point Loss within 7 points - 1 point Loss greater than 7 points - 0 points Rank refers to World Rugby Rankings before the start of the tournament

== Fixtures ==
The tournament was played in a round-robin format, with each team playing the five others once. The fixtures were announced on 6 September 2016.

=== Week 1 ===
3 February 2017
20:15 BRST (UTC-02)

| Brazil | 17–3 | Chile |
| Try: Cruz 55' c F. Sancery 60' c Con: Duque (2/2) 56', 61'; Pen: Duque (1/2) 72' | Report | Pen: Nordenflycht (1/2) 3' |

Pacaembu Stadium, São Paulo
Attendance: 3,500
Referee: Claudio Cativelli (Uruguay)

| FB | 15 | Daniel Sancery | | (substituted off) 64' |
| RW | 14 | De Wet van Niekerk | | (substituted off) 63' |
| OC | 13 | Felipe Sancery | (yellow card) 9' to 19' |
| IC | 12 | Moisés Duque |
| LW | 11 | Stefano Giantorno |
| FH | 10 | Josh Reeves |
| SH | 9 | Beukes Cremer | | (substituted off) 51' |
| N8 | 8 | Nick Smith (c) | | (substituted off) 41' |
| OF | 7 | André Arruda |
| BF | 6 | João Luiz da Ros |
| RL | 5 | Lucas Piero |
| LL | 4 | Diego López |
| TP | 3 | Wilton Rebolo |
| HK | 2 | Yan Rosetti | | (substituted off) 76' |
| LP | 1 | Alexandre Alves | | (substituted off) 51' |
Replacements:
| HK | 16 | Daniel Danielewicz | | (substituted on) 76' |
| PR | 17 | Jonatas Paulo |
| PR | 18 | Vitor Ancina | | (substituted on) 51' |
| LK | 19 | Felipe Tissot |
| FL | 20 | Matheus Daniel | | (substituted on) 41' |
| SH | 21 | Matheus Cruz | | (substituted on) 51' |
| CE | 22 | Luan Smanio | | (substituted on) 63' |
| FH | 23 | Guilherme Coghetto | | (substituted on) 64' |
Coach:
(Argentina) Rodolfo Ambrosio

| FB | 15 | Rodrigo Fernández |
| RW | 14 | Martín Verschae | | (substituted off) 70' |
| OC | 13 | Franco Velarde |
| IC | 12 | Matías Nordenflycht | | (substituted off) 40' |
| LW | 11 | Pedro Verschae |
| FH | 10 | Francisco González Moller |
| SH | 9 | Beltrán Vergara | | (substituted off) 49' |
| N8 | 8 | Manuel Dagnino | | (substituted off) 56' |
| OF | 7 | Anton Petrowitsch |
| BF | 6 | Cristóbal Niedmann | 35' to 42' |
| RL | 5 | Nikola Bursic |
| LL | 4 | Mario Mayol | | (substituted off) 71' |
| TP | 3 | José Tomás Munita | | (substituted off) 67' |
| HK | 2 | Tomás Dussaillant | | (substituted off) 47' |
| LP | 1 | Claudio Zamorano (c) | (yellow card) 31' to 41' | (substituted off) 67' |
Replacements:
| HK | 16 | Rodrigo Moya | | (substituted on) 47' |
| PR | 17 | Vittorio Lastra | (substituted on) 35' (substituted off) 42' | (substituted on) 67' |
| PR | 18 | Gonzalo Martínez | | (substituted on) 67' |
| N8 | 19 | Nicanor Machuca | | (substituted on) 71' |
| N8 | 20 | Benjamín Soto | | (substituted on) 56' |
| SH | 21 | Jan Hasenlechner | | (substituted on) 49' |
| FH | 22 | Francisco Cruz | | (substituted on) 70' |
| WG | 23 | Tomás Ianiszewski | | (substituted on) 40' |
Coach:
(France) Bernard Charreyre

Touch judges:
Ricardo Sant'Anna (Brazil)
Murillo Bragotto (Brazil)

Notes:

- This was Brazil's first victory over Chile since 2014, and their largest margin of victory over Chile in their history.
- Josh Reeves and De Wet van Niekerk made their international debuts for Brazil.
- Vittorio Lastra, Nicanor Machuca, Gonzalo Martínez and Franco Velarde made their international debuts for Chile.

4 February 2017
15:00 CST (UTC-06)

| United States | 29–23 | Uruguay (1 BP) |
| Try: Campbell 36' c Scully 62' c Con: Cima (1/1) 37'; MacGinty (1/1) 62'; Pen: Cima (3/4) 6', 22', 31'; MacGinty (2/3) 55', 66' | Report | Try: Gattas 15' c Nieto 46' c Con: Albanell (2/2) 15', 45'; Pen: Albanell (2/3) 4', 40', 54' |

Toyota Field, San Antonio
Attendance: 3,000
Referee: Chris Assmus (Canada)

| FB | 15 | Mike Te'o |
| RW | 14 | Blaine Scully (c) |
| OC | 13 | Bryce Campbell |
| IC | 12 | AJ MacGinty |
| LW | 11 | Zack Test | | (substituted off) 40' |
| FH | 10 | Ben Cima | | (substituted off) 52' |
| SH | 9 | Nate Augspurger | | (substituted off) 71' |
| N8 | 8 | Alastair McFarland |
| OF | 7 | Todd Clever | (yellow card) 12' to 22' | (substituted off) 53' |
| BF | 6 | John Quill |
| RL | 5 | Nick Civetta |
| LL | 4 | Nate Brakeley | | (substituted off) 59' |
| TP | 3 | Chris Baumann | | (substituted off) 51' |
| HK | 2 | Peter Malcolm | | (substituted off) 51' |
| LP | 1 | Anthony Purpura | | (substituted off) 59' |
Replacements:
| HK | 16 | James Hilterbrand | | (substituted on) 51' |
| PR | 17 | Alex Maughan | | (substituted on) 59' |
| PR | 18 | Dino Waldren | | (substituted on) 51' |
| LK | 19 | Matthew Jensen | | (substituted on) 59' |
| FL | 20 | Tony Lamborn | | (substituted on) 53' |
| SH | 21 | Shaun Davies | | (substituted on) 71' |
| FH | 22 | Will Magie | | (substituted on) 52' |
| CE | 23 | JP Eloff | | (substituted on) 40' |
Coach:
(New Zealand) John Mitchell

| FB | 15 | Rodrigo Silva |
| RW | 14 | Leandro Leivas |
| OC | 13 | Juan Manuel Cat | (yellow card) 48' to 58' |
| IC | 12 | Juan de Freitas | | (substituted off) 59' |
| LW | 11 | Andrés Rocco | | (substituted off) 59' |
| FH | 10 | Germán Albanell |
| SH | 9 | Santiago Arata | | (substituted off) 69' |
| N8 | 8 | Alejandro Nieto (c) |
| OF | 7 | Franco Lamanna |
| BF | 6 | Rodolfo Garese | | (substituted off) 65' |
| RL | 5 | Diego Ayala | | (substituted off) 65' |
| LL | 4 | Ignacio Dotti |
| TP | 3 | Juan Echeverría | | (substituted off) 77' |
| HK | 2 | Facundo Gattas | | (substituted off) 71' |
| LP | 1 | Mateo Sanguinetti | | (substituted off) 71' |
Replacements:
| HK | 16 | Diego Pombo | | (substituted on) 71' |
| PR | 17 | Matías Benítez | | (substituted on) 71' |
| PR | 18 | Felipe Inciarte | | (substituted on) 77' |
| FL | 19 | Juan Diego Ormaechea | | (substituted on) 65' |
| LK | 20 | Diego Magno | | (substituted on) 65' |
| SH | 21 | Guillermo Lijtenstein | | (substituted on) 69' |
| FH | 22 | Francisco Berchesi | | (substituted on) 59' |
| WG | 23 | Gastón Gibernau | | (substituted on) 59' |
Coach:
(Argentina) Esteban Meneses

Touch judges:
Derek Summers (United States)
Scott Green (United States)

Notes:

- Ben Cima, Matthew Jensen, Will Magie, Peter Malcolm, Alex Maughan and Dino Waldren made their international debuts for the United States.
- Francisco Berchesi, Felipe Inciarte, Rodolfo Garese and Diego Pombo made their international debuts for Uruguay.

4 February 2017
17:000 PST (UTC-08)

| Canada | 6–20 | Argentina XV |
| Pen: McRorie (2/2) 12', 62' | Report | Try: Medrano 50' c Tuculet 66' c Con: Miotti (2/2) 51', 67'; Pen: Miotti (2/2) 2', 75' |

Westhills Stadium, Langford
Attendance: 2,000
Referee: Kurt Weaver (United States)

| FB | 15 | Carl Pocock | | (substituted off) 57' |
| RW | 14 | Dan Moor |
| OC | 13 | Brock Staller | | (substituted off) 72' |
| IC | 12 | Nick Blevins |
| LW | 11 | Taylor Paris |
| FH | 10 | Robbie Povey | | (substituted off) 58' |
| SH | 9 | Gordon McRorie (c) |
| N8 | 8 | Clay Panga | | (substituted off) 58' |
| OF | 7 | Lucas Rumball | (yellow card) 2' to 12' |
| BF | 6 | Admir Cejvanovic |
| RL | 5 | Liam Chisholm | | (substituted off) 65' |
| LL | 4 | Conor Keys |
| TP | 3 | Matt Tierney | | (substituted off) 65' |
| HK | 2 | Eric Howard | | (substituted off) 58' |
| LP | 1 | Rob Brouwer | | (substituted off) 51' |
Replacements:
| HK | 16 | Benoît Piffero | | (substituted on) 58' |
| PR | 17 | Djustice Sears-Duru | | (substituted on) 51' |
| PR | 18 | Cole Keith | | (substituted on) 65' |
| LK | 19 | Reegan O'Gorman | | (substituted on) 65' |
| LK | 20 | Matt Beukeboom | | (substituted on) 58' |
| SH | 21 | Phil Mack | | (substituted on) 58' |
| FH | 22 | Giuseppe du Toit | | (substituted on) 72' |
| CE | 23 | George Barton | | (substituted on) 57' |
Coach:
(New Zealand) Mark Anscombe

| FB | 15 | Bautista Delguy |
| RW | 14 | Fernando Luna |
| OC | 13 | Juan Cappiello | | (substituted off) 70' |
| IC | 12 | Bruno Devoto |
| LW | 11 | Santiago Álvarez | | (substituted off) 60' |
| FH | 10 | Domingo Miotti |
| SH | 9 | Sebastián Cancelliere | | (substituted off) 73' |
| N8 | 8 | Tomás de la Vega |
| OF | 7 | Lautaro Bavaro (c) |
| BF | 6 | Francisco Gorrissen | | (substituted off) 70' |
| RL | 5 | Pedro Ortega |
| LL | 4 | Juan Cruz Guillemaín | | (substituted off) 68' |
| TP | 3 | Cristian Bartoloni | | (substituted off) 50' |
| HK | 2 | Gaspar Baldunciel | | (substituted off) 70' |
| LP | 1 | Franco Brarda | | (substituted off) 70' |
Replacements:
| HK | 16 | Marcelo Brandi | | (substituted on) 70' |
| PR | 17 | Nicolás Solveyra | | (substituted on) 70' |
| PR | 18 | Santiago Medrano | | (substituted on) 50' |
| LK | 19 | Franco Molina | | (substituted on) 68' |
| N8 | 20 | Rodrigo Bruni | | (substituted on) 70' |
| SH | 21 | Juan Manuel Lescano | (yellow card) 78' to 80' | (substituted on) 73' |
| CE | 22 | Tomás Granella | | (substituted on) 70' |
| FB | 23 | Segundo Tuculet | | (substituted on) 60' |
Coach:
(Argentina) Felipe Contepomi

Man of the Match:

Touch judges:
Harry Mason (Canada)
Michael Jones (Canada)

=== Week 2 ===
11 February 2017
19:00 ART (UTC-03)

| Argentina XV (1 BP) | 57–12 | Uruguay |
| Try: Cancelliere (3) 16' c, 24' m, 48' c Miotti 28' m Brandi 35' c Montagner (2) 55' m, 79' c Álvarez 59' c Luna 69' c Con: Miotti (3/5) 17', 36', 49'; Granella (1/2) 60'; Luna (2/2) 70', 80' | Report | Try: Arata 13' c J. de Freitas 46' m Con: Albanell (1/2) 14' |

Estadio Villa Mitre, Bahía Blanca
Attendance: 6,000
Referee: Kurt Weaver (United States)

| FB | 15 | Bautista Delguy |
| RW | 14 | Segundo Tuculet | (substituted off) 60' |
| OC | 13 | Santiago Álvarez |
| IC | 12 | Juan Cappiello |
| LW | 11 | Julián Domínguez |
| FH | 10 | Domingo Miotti | (substituted off) 52' |
| SH | 9 | Sebastián Cancelliere | (substituted off) 54' |
| N8 | 8 | Tomás de la Vega | (substituted off) 52' |
| OF | 7 | Lautaro Bavaro (c) |
| BF | 6 | Mariano Romanini |
| RL | 5 | Ignacio Larrague |
| LL | 4 | Pedro Ortega | (substituted off) 54' |
| TP | 3 | Santiago Medrano | (substituted off) 62' |
| HK | 2 | Marcelo Brandi | (substituted off) 52' |
| LP | 1 | Francisco Ferronato | (substituted off) 60' |
Replacements:
| HK | 16 | Axel Zapata | (substituted on) 52' |
| PR | 17 | Eduardo Bello | (substituted on) 60' |
| PR | 18 | Alejo Brem | (substituted on) 62' |
| LK | 19 | Franco Molina | (substituted on) 54' |
| N8 | 20 | Santiago Montagner | (substituted on) 52' |
| SH | 21 | Lautaro Bazán | (substituted on) 54' |
| CE | 22 | Tomás Granella | (substituted on) 52' |
| WG | 23 | Fernando Luna | (substituted on) 60' |
Coach:
(Argentina) Felipe Contepomi

| FB | 15 | Rodrigo Silva |
| RW | 14 | Nicolás Freitas | (yellow card) 53' to 63' |
| OC | 13 | Juan Manuel Cat |
| IC | 12 | Juan de Freitas |
| LW | 11 | Francisco Berchesi | | (substituted off) 27' |
| FH | 10 | Germán Albanell | | (substituted off) 60' |
| SH | 9 | Santiago Arata | | (substituted off) 52' |
| N8 | 8 | Alejandro Nieto (c) |
| OF | 7 | Gonzalo Soto | (substituted off) 23' (substituted on) 32' |
| BF | 6 | Rodolfo Garese |
| RL | 5 | Diego Magno |
| LL | 4 | Ignacio Dotti | | (substituted off) 62' |
| TP | 3 | Juan Echeverría | 57' to 72' |
| HK | 2 | Martín Espiga | | (substituted off) 62' |
| LP | 1 | Mateo Sanguinetti | (yellow card) 22' to 32' | (substituted off) 60' |
Replacements:
| HK | 16 | Facundo Gattas | (substituted on) 23' (substituted off) 32' | (substituted on) 60' |
| PR | 17 | Matías Benítez | | (substituted on) 62' |
| PR | 18 | Felipe Inciarte | (substituted on) 57' (substituted off) 72' |
| LK | 19 | Diego Ayala | | (substituted on) 62' |
| N8 | 20 | Manuel Diana | | (substituted on) 43' |
| SH | 21 | Guillermo Lijtenstein | | (substituted on) 52' |
| FH | 22 | Lucas Durán | | (substituted on) 60' |
| FB | 23 | Ignacio García | | (substituted on) 27' |
Coach:
(Argentina) Esteban Meneses

Touch judges:
Damián Schneider (Argentina)
Santiago Altobelli (Argentina)

11 February 2017
18:00 CST (UTC-06)

| United States (1 BP) | 51–3 | Brazil |
| Try: SP. Davis 3' m Eloff 28' m Lamborn (2) 44' m, 66' c Dolan 57' m Te'o 73' c Campbell 76' c Tiberio 80' c Con: Cima (4/4) 66', 73', 76', 81'; Pen: Magie (1/2) 13' | Report | Pen: Duque (1/1) 50' |

Dell Diamond, Round Rock
Attendance: 6,091
Referee: Pablo de Luca (Argentina)

| FB | 15 | Mike Te'o |
| RW | 14 | Spike Davis | (substituted off) 59' |
| OC | 13 | Bryce Campbell |
| IC | 12 | JP Eloff |
| LW | 11 | Nate Augspurger |
| FH | 10 | Will Magie | (substituted off) 59' |
| SH | 9 | Shaun Davies | (substituted off) 71' |
| N8 | 8 | Alastair McFarland | (substituted off) 52' |
| OF | 7 | Tony Lamborn |
| BF | 6 | John Quill | (substituted off) 62' |
| RL | 5 | Nick Civetta |
| LL | 4 | Nate Brakeley |
| TP | 3 | Dino Waldren | (substituted off) 40' |
| HK | 2 | James Hilterbrand (c) | (substituted off) 59' |
| LP | 1 | Ben Tarr | (substituted off) 40' |
Replacements:
| HK | 16 | Peter Malcolm | (substituted on) 59' |
| PR | 17 | Anthony Purpura | (substituted on) 40' |
| PR | 18 | Chris Baumann | (substituted on) 40' |
| N8 | 19 | Cameron Dolan | (substituted on) 52' |
| FL | 20 | Todd Clever | (substituted on) 62' |
| FH | 21 | Ben Cima | (substituted on) 59' |
| CE | 22 | Peter Tiberio | (substituted on) 59' |
| WG | 23 | Deion Mikesell | (substituted on) 71' |
Coach:
(New Zealand) John Mitchell

| FB | 15 | Daniel Sancery |
| RW | 14 | De Wet van Niekerk |
| OC | 13 | Felipe Sancery | | (substituted off) 69' |
| IC | 12 | Moisés Duque |
| LW | 11 | Stefano Giantorno | | (substituted off) 53' |
| FH | 10 | Josh Reeves |
| SH | 9 | Matheus Cruz | | (substituted off) 72' |
| N8 | 8 | Nick Smith (c) |
| OF | 7 | André Arruda |
| BF | 6 | João Luiz da Ros | | (substituted off) 40' |
| RL | 5 | Lucas Piero | | (substituted off) 45' |
| LL | 4 | Luiz Vieira | (yellow card) 15' to 25' |
| TP | 3 | Wilton Rebolo | | (substituted off) 59' |
| HK | 2 | Yan Rosetti | | | | (substituted off) 75' |
| LP | 1 | Jonatas Paulo | | (substituted off) 36' |
Replacements:
| HK | 16 | Daniel Danielewicz | | | (substituted on) 70' |
| PR | 17 | Pedro Bengaló | | (substituted on) 36' | 70' to 75' |
| PR | 18 | Caíque Silva | | (substituted on) 59' |
| LK | 19 | Diego López | | (substituted on) 45' |
| FL | 20 | Artur Bergo | | (substituted on) 40' |
| SH | 21 | Beukes Cremer | | (substituted on) 72' |
| CE | 22 | Luan Smanio | | (substituted on) 69' |
| FH | 23 | Guilherme Coghetto | | (substituted on) 53' |
Coach:
(Argentina) Rodolfo Ambrosio

Touch judges:
Scott Green (USA)
Jim Rogers (USA)

Notes:

- Spike Davis and Peter Tiberio made their international debuts for the United States.

11 February 2017
17:00 PST (UTC-08)

| Canada (1 BP) | 36–15 | Chile |
| Try: Paris (3) 26' c, 36' c, 52' m Barton 66' c Moor 80' c Con: McRorie (2/3) 27', 37'; Povey (2/2) 67', 80'; Pen: McRorie (1/1) 29' | Report | Try: Orpis 60' c Fernández 75' m Con: Ianiszewski (1/2) 61'; Pen: Ianiszewski (1/1) 7' |

Westhills Stadium, Langford
Attendance: 1,509
Referee: Derek Summers (United States)

| FB | 15 | Brock Staller |
| RW | 14 | Dan Moor |
| OC | 13 | Nick Blevins |
| IC | 12 | Giuseppe du Toit | (substituted off) 65' |
| LW | 11 | Taylor Paris |
| FH | 10 | Gradyn Bowd | (substituted off) 51' |
| SH | 9 | Gordon McRorie (c) | (substituted off) 62' |
| N8 | 8 | Admir Cejvanovic |
| OF | 7 | Ollie Nott | (substituted off) 53' | (substituted on) 77' |
| BF | 6 | Lucas Rumball |
| RL | 5 | Liam Chisholm | (substituted off) 57' |
| LL | 4 | Conor Keys |
| TP | 3 | Matt Tierney | (substituted off) 62' |
| HK | 2 | Benoît Piffero | (substituted off) 62' |
| LP | 1 | Djustice Sears-Duru | (substituted off) 62' |
Replacements:
| HK | 16 | Eric Howard | (substituted on) 62' |
| PR | 17 | Rob Brouwer | (substituted on) 62' |
| PR | 18 | Cole Keith | (substituted on) 62' |
| LK | 19 | Reegan O'Gorman | (substituted on) 57' |
| LK | 20 | Matt Beukeboom | (substituted on) 53' | (substituted off) 77' |
| SH | 21 | Phil Mack | (substituted on) 62' |
| FH | 22 | Robbie Povey | (substituted on) 51' |
| CE | 23 | George Barton | (substituted on) 65' |
Coach:
(New Zealand) Mark Anscombe

| FB | 15 | Pedro Verschae |
| RW | 14 | Franco Velarde |
| OC | 13 | José Ignacio Larenas | (yellow card) 78' to 80' |
| IC | 12 | Simón Pardakhty | | (substituted off) 69' |
| LW | 11 | Tomás Ianiszewski |
| FH | 10 | Francisco Cruz | (yellow card) 25' to 35' | (substituted off) 51' |
| SH | 9 | Jan Hasenlechner | | (substituted off) 55' |
| N8 | 8 | Benjamín Soto (c) | (yellow card) 39' to 49' |
| OF | 7 | Anton Petrowitsch |
| BF | 6 | Arturo Seeman | | (substituted off) 57' |
| RL | 5 | Mario Mayol |
| LL | 4 | Nikola Bursic | | (substituted off) 40' |
| TP | 3 | José Tomás Munita | | (substituted off) 69' |
| HK | 2 | Rodrigo Moya | | (substituted off) 69' |
| LP | 1 | Vittorio Lastra | | (substituted off) 48' |
Replacements:
| HK | 16 | Martín Mendoza | | (substituted on) 69' |
| PR | 17 | Claudio Zamorano | | (substituted on) 48' |
| PR | 18 | Gonzalo Martínez | | (substituted on) 69' |
| FL | 19 | Manuel Dagnino | | (substituted on) 40' |
| FL | 20 | Eduardo Orpis | | (substituted on) 57' |
| WG | 21 | Juan Pablo Larenas | | (substituted on) 55' |
| FH | 22 | Jorge Castillo | | (substituted on) 51' |
| FB | 23 | Rodrigo Fernández | | (substituted on) 69' |
Coach:
(France) Bernard Charreyre

Touch judges:
Doug Hamre (Canada)
Robin Kaluzniak (Canada)

Notes:

- This was Canada's 100th test victory.
- Martín Mendoza and Arturo Seeman made their international debuts for Chile.
- George Barton, Matt Beukeboom, Giuseppe Du Toit, Cole Keith, Conor Keys, Oliver Nott, Reegan O'Gorman and Robbie Povey made their international debuts for Canada.

=== Week 3 ===
18 February 2017
18:00 CLST (UTC-03)

| Chile | 10–45 | Argentina XV (1 BP) |
| Try: R. Fernández 68' c Con: Moller (1/1) 69'; Pen: Castillo (1/1) 7' | Report | Try: Cappiello 15' c Luna 40' c Solveyra 46' c Delguy 52' c Devoto (2) 61' c, 77' c Con: González (3/3) 16', 40', 47'; Luna (3/3) 53', 62', 78'; Pen: González (1/1) 24' |

Estadio CAP, Talcahuano
Attendance: 5,000
Referee: Ricardo Sant'Anna (Brazil)

| FB | 15 | Rodrigo Fernández |
| RW | 14 | Martín Fernández | | | | (substituted off) 34' | (substituted on) 42' |
| OC | 13 | José Ignacio Larenas (c) | | (substituted off) 62' |
| IC | 12 | Ricardo Sifri | | (substituted off) 54' |
| LW | 11 | Martín Verschae |
| FH | 10 | Jorge Castillo | | (substituted off) 48' |
| SH | 9 | Juan Pablo Larenas | | | | | | | | (substituted off) 74' |
| N8 | 8 | Benjamín Soto |
| OF | 7 | Anton Petrowitsch |
| BF | 6 | Cristóbal Niedmann | | 25' to 29' | | (substituted off) 70' |
| RL | 5 | Nelson Calderón |
| LL | 4 | Mario Mayol | | (substituted off) 59' |
| TP | 3 | Gonzalo Martínez | | (substituted off) 19' |
| HK | 2 | Manuel Garruchaga | | (substituted off) 55' |
| LP | 1 | Claudio Zamorano | (yellow card) 72' (red card) | 5' to 6' | | | | 62' to 70' |
Replacements:
| HK | 16 | Martín Mendoza | | (substituted on) 55' |
| PR | 17 | Sebastián Valech | | (substituted on) 5' | (substituted off) 6' | (substituted on) 34' | (substituted off) 42' | (substituted on) 62' | (substituted off) 70' | (substituted on) 74' |
| PE | 18 | José Tomás Munita | | (substituted on) 19' |
| FL | 19 | Manuel Dagnino | | (substituted on) 59' |
| FL | 20 | Eduardo Orpis | | (substituted on) 25' | (substituted off) 29' | (substituted on) 70' |
| SH | 21 | Sergio Bascuñán | | (substituted on) 62' |
| FH | 22 | Francisco González Moller | | (substituted on) 48' |
| CE | 23 | Mauricio Urrutia | | (substituted on) 54' |
Coach:
(France) Bernard Charreyre

| FB | 15 | Fernando Luna |
| RW | 14 | Santiago Álvarez | (substituted off) 48' |
| OC | 13 | Juan Cappiello (c) |
| IC | 12 | Bruno Devoto |
| LW | 11 | Germán Schulz |
| FH | 10 | Juan Cruz González | (substituted off) 48' |
| SH | 9 | Lautaro Bazán | (substituted off) 64' |
| N8 | 8 | Rodrigo Bruni | (substituted off) 58' |
| OF | 7 | Santiago Montagner |
| BF | 6 | Francisco Gorrissen |
| RL | 5 | Ignacio Larrague |
| LL | 4 | Franco Molina | (substituted off) 48' |
| TP | 3 | Eduardo Bello | (substituted off) 55' |
| HK | 2 | Axel Zapata | (substituted off) 62' |
| LP | 1 | Nicolás Solveyra | (substituted off) 55' |
Replacements:
| HK | 16 | Marcelo Brandi | (substituted on) 62' |
| PR | 17 | Francisco Ferronato | (substituted on) 55' |
| PR | 18 | Alejo Brem | (substituted on) 55' |
| LK | 19 | Pedro Ortega | (substituted on) 48' |
| FL | 20 | Lautaro Bavaro | (substituted on) 58' |
| SH | 21 | Sebastián Cancelliere | (substituted on) 64' |
| CE | 22 | Tomás Granella | (substituted on) 48' |
| FB | 23 | Bautista Delguy | (substituted on) 48' |
Coach:
(Argentina) Felipe Contepomi

Touch judges:
Francisco Saavedra (Chile)
Luis Díaz (Chile)

18 February 2017
20:00 UYT (UTC-03)

| Uruguay (1 BP) | 23–12 | Brazil |
| Try: Ayala 7' m Dotti 16' m Nieto 40' m Arata 45' m Pen: Albanell (1/3) 50' | Report | Pen: Duque (4/4) 2', 12', 43', 64' |

Estadio Domingo Burgueño, Maldonado
Attendance: 2,300
Referee: Pablo de Luca (Argentina)

| FB | 15 | Rodrigo Silva |
| RW | 14 | Leandro Leivas |
| OC | 13 | Juan Manuel Cat |
| IC | 12 | Andrés Vilaseca | (substituted off) 51' |
| LW | 11 | Nicolás Freitas |
| FH | 10 | Germán Albanell |
| SH | 9 | Santiago Arata | (substituted off) 61' |
| N8 | 8 | Alejandro Nieto |
| OF | 7 | Gonzalo Soto | (substituted off) 61' |
| BF | 6 | Juan Manuel Gaminara (c) | (substituted off) 51' |
| RL | 5 | Diego Ayala | (substituted off) 61' |
| LL | 4 | Ignacio Dotti |
| TP | 3 | Mario Sagario | (substituted off) 51' |
| HK | 2 | Martín Espiga | (substituted off) 65' |
| LP | 1 | Mateo Sanguinetti | (substituted off) 74' |
Replacements:
| HK | 16 | Facundo Gattas | (substituted on) 65' |
| PR | 17 | Matías Benítez | (substituted on) 74' |
| PR | 18 | Juan Echeverría | (substituted on) 51' |
| LK | 19 | Lorenzo Surraco | (substituted on) 61' |
| FL | 20 | Juan Diego Ormaechea | (substituted on) 51' |
| SH | 21 | Guillermo Lijtenstein | (substituted on) 61' |
| WG | 22 | Gastón Gibernau | (substituted on) 51' |
| N8 | 23 | Manuel Diana | (substituted on) 61' |
Coach:
(Argentina) Esteban Meneses

| FB | 15 | Daniel Sancery |
| RW | 14 | Robert Tenório | | | (substituted off) 79' |
| OC | 13 | Felipe Sancery | | | (substituted off) 79' |
| IC | 12 | Moisés Duque |
| LW | 11 | De Wet van Niekerk |
| FH | 10 | Josh Reeves |
| SH | 9 | Matheus Cruz | | | (substituted off) 79' |
| N8 | 8 | Nick Smith | | | (substituted off) 61' |
| OF | 7 | Cléber Dias | | | (substituted off) 36' |
| BF | 6 | Matheus Daniel | | (substituted off) 69' (substituted on) 79' |
| RL | 5 | Diego López |
| LL | 4 | Lucas Piero |
| TP | 3 | Pedro Bengaló | | | (substituted off) 56' |
| HK | 2 | Daniel Danielewicz | 40' to 51' | (yellow card) 68' to 78' |
| LP | 1 | Wilton Rebolo |
Replacements:
| HK | 16 | Endy Willian | (substituted on) 40' (substituted off) 51' |
| PR | 17 | Vitor Ancina | | | (substituted on) 56' |
| PR | 18 | Matheus Rocha | | (substituted on) 69' (substituted off) 79' |
| FL | 19 | André Arruda | | | (substituted on) 36' |
| FL | 20 | João Luiz da Ros | | | (substituted on) 61' |
| SH | 21 | Beukes Cremer | | | (substituted on) 79' |
| CE | 22 | Luan Smanio | | | (substituted on) 79' |
| WG | 23 | Ariel Rodrigues | | | (substituted on) 79' |
Coach:
(Argentina) Rodolfo Ambrosio

Touch judges:
Joaquín Montes (Uruguay)
Francisco González (Uruguay)

Notes:

- Matheus Rocha, Ariel Rodrigues and Endy Willian made their international debuts for Brazil.
- Manuel Diana and Lorenzo Surraco made their international debuts for Uruguay.

18 February 2017
17:00 PST (UTC-08)

| Canada (1 BP) | 34–51 | United States (1 BP) |
| Try: Paris (2) 14' m, 56' m Mack 20' c Barton 68' c Cejvanovic 77' c Con: Povey (1/2) 21'; McRorie (2/3) 69', 78'; Pen: Povey (1/2) 36' | Report | Try: Matyas 2' c Te'o (3) 4' m, 45' m, 71' c Purpura 39' c Clever 53' c Quill 64' c Con: Davies (5/7) 3', 40', 54', 65', 72'; Pen: Magie (1/1) 11'; Davies (1/1) 31' |

Swangard Stadium, Burnaby
Attendance: 3,416
Referee: Damián Schneider (Argentina)

| FB | 15 | Brock Staller |
| RW | 14 | Dan Moor |
| OC | 13 | Nick Blevins | | (substituted off) 40' |
| IC | 12 | Giuseppe du Toit |
| LW | 11 | Taylor Paris | 40' to 44' | (substituted off) 66' |
| FH | 10 | Robbie Povey |
| SH | 9 | Phil Mack | | (substituted off) 55' |
| N8 | 8 | Admir Cejvanovic |
| OF | 7 | Ollie Nott | (substituted off) 44' (substituted on) 47' | (substituted off) 58' |
| BF | 6 | Lucas Rumball |
| RL | 5 | Reegan O'Gorman |
| LL | 4 | Conor Keys |
| TP | 3 | Matt Tierney | | (substituted off) 66' |
| HK | 2 | Ray Barkwill (c) | (yellow card) 38' to 48' | (substituted off) 58' |
| LP | 1 | Rob Brouwer | | (substituted off) 50' |
Replacements:
| HK | 16 | Benoît Piffero | (substituted on) 44' (substituted off) 47' | (substituted on) 58' |
| PR | 17 | Djustice Sears-Duru | | (substituted on) 50' |
| PR | 18 | Cole Keith | | (substituted on) 66' |
| LK | 19 | Liam Chisholm |
| FL | 20 | Lucas Albornoz | | (substituted on) 58' |
| SH | 21 | Gordon McRorie | | (substituted on) 55' |
| FH | 22 | Gradyn Bowd | | (substituted on) 40' |
| CE | 23 | George Barton | (substituted on) 40' (substituted off) 44' | (substituted on) 66' |
Coach:
(New Zealand) Mark Anscombe

| FB | 15 | Mike Te'o |
| RW | 14 | Ryan Matyas | (substituted off) 50' |
| OC | 13 | Bryce Campbell |
| IC | 12 | JP Eloff |
| LW | 11 | Nate Augspurger |
| FH | 10 | Will Magie |
| SH | 9 | Shaun Davies | (substituted off) 72' |
| N8 | 8 | Cam Dolan |
| OF | 7 | Tony Lamborn | (substituted off) 61' |
| BF | 6 | Todd Clever (c) | (substituted off) 56' |
| RL | 5 | Nick Civetta | (substituted off) 66' |
| LL | 4 | Nate Brakeley |
| TP | 3 | Chris Baumann | (substituted off) 50' |
| HK | 2 | Peter Malcolm | (substituted off) 50' |
| LP | 1 | Anthony Purpura | (substituted off) 56' |
Replacements:
| HK | 16 | James Hilterbrand | (substituted on) 50' |
| PR | 17 | Dino Waldren | (substituted on) 50' |
| PR | 18 | Ben Tarr | (substituted on) 56' |
| LK | 19 | Siaosi Mahoni | (substituted on) 66' |
| FL | 20 | John Quill | (substituted on) 61' |
| N8 | 21 | David Tameilau | (substituted on) 56' |
| FH | 22 | Ben Cima | (substituted on) 50' |
| WG | 23 | Spike Davis | (substituted on) 72' |
Coach:
(New Zealand) John Mitchell

Touch judges:
David Smortchevsky (Canada)
David Crisp (Canada)

Notes:

- Lucas Albornoz made his international debut for Canada.
- Siaosi Mahoni made his international debut for the United States.
- The 51 points scored by the United States are the most pointed conceded by Canada on home soil against the Eagles.

=== Week 4 ===
25 February 2017
15:40 CLT (UTC-03)

| Chile | 9–57 | United States (1 BP) |
| Pen: Moller (3/3) 17', 34', 48' | Report | Try: Dolan 24' c Lamborn (2) 36' c, 76' c Tameilau 50' c Jensen 52' m Clever 66' c Malcolm (2) 78' c, 80' c Con: Cima (7/8) 25', 37', 51', 67', 77', 79', 80'; Pen: Cima (1/1) 5' |

Pista Atlética San Carlos de Apoquindo, Santiago
Attendance: 900
Referee: Ricardo Sant'Anna (Brazil)

| FB | 15 | Pedro Verschae |
| RW | 14 | Matías Contreras | | (substituted off) 40' |
| OC | 13 | Franco Velarde |
| IC | 12 | Simón Pardakhty | (yellow card) 58' to 68' |
| LW | 11 | Tomás Ianiszewski |
| FH | 10 | Francisco González Moller | | (substituted off) 67' |
| SH | 9 | Sergio Bascuñán | (yellow card) 22' to 32' | (substituted off) 62' |
| N8 | 8 | Manuel Dagnino | | (substituted off) 65' |
| OF | 7 | Anton Petrowitsch |
| BF | 6 | Arturo Seeman | 26' to 35' | (substituted off) 62' |
| RL | 5 | Nikola Bursic |
| LL | 4 | Mario Mayol |
| TP | 3 | José Tomás Munita | | (substituted off) 54' |
| HK | 2 | Manuel Garruchaga (c) | | (substituted off) 67' |
| LP | 1 | Vittorio Lastra | | (substituted off) 54' |
Replacements:
| HK | 16 | Rodrigo Moya | | (substituted on) 67' |
| PR | 17 | Sebastián Valech | | (substituted on) 54' |
| PR | 18 | Ernesto Ugarte | | (substituted on) 54' |
| LK | 19 | Nelson Calderón | | (substituted on) 62' |
| FL | 20 | Eduardo Orpis | (substituted on) 26' (substituted off) 35' | (substituted on) 65' |
| SH | 21 | Beltrán Vergara | | (substituted on) 62' |
| FH | 22 | Jorge Castillo | | (substituted on) 67' |
| CE | 23 | Mauricio Urrutia | | (substituted on) 40' |
Coach:
(France) Bernard Charreyre

| FB | 15 | Mike Te'o |
| RW | 14 | Spike Davis | | (substituted off) 65' |
| OC | 13 | Bryce Campbell | (yellow card) 43' to 53' |
| IC | 12 | JP Eloff | | (substituted off) 62' |
| LW | 11 | Nate Augspurger (c) |
| FH | 10 | Ben Cima |
| SH | 9 | Shaun Davies | | (substituted off) 67' |
| N8 | 8 | Cam Dolan |
| OF | 7 | Tony Lamborn |
| BF | 6 | Todd Clever | | (substituted off) 67' |
| RL | 5 | Siaosi Mahoni | | (substituted off) 49' |
| LL | 4 | Matthew Jensen |
| TP | 3 | Chris Baumann | | (substituted off) 58' |
| HK | 2 | James Hilterbrand | | (substituted off) 51' |
| LP | 1 | Ben Tarr | | (substituted off) 49' |
Replacements:
| HK | 16 | Peter Malcolm | | (substituted on) 51' |
| PR | 17 | Anthony Purpura | | (substituted on) 49' |
| PR | 18 | Olive Kilifi | | (substituted on) 58' |
| FL | 19 | Hanco Germishuys | | (substituted on) 67' |
| N8 | 20 | David Tameilau | | (substituted on) 49' |
| FH | 21 | Will Magie | | (substituted on) 65' |
| CE | 22 | Calvin Whiting | | (substituted on) 62' |
| WG | 23 | Andrew Turner | | (substituted on) 67' |
Coach:
(New Zealand) John Mitchell

Touch judges:
Frank Méndez (Chile)
Tomás Fernández (Chile)

Notes:

- Andrew Turner and Calvin Whiting made their international debuts for the United States.

25 February 2017
17:40 ART (UTC-03)

| Argentina XV (1 BP) | 79–7 | Brazil |
| Try: Cancelliere (2) 3' m, 55' c Brarda 18' c De la Vega (2) 36' c, 49' c Brandi 43' m Schulz 52' c Larrague 61' m Boffelli 66' c Cappiello 69' c Bazán (2) 73' c, 79' m Con: Miotti (3/5) 19', 37', 50'; Granella (4/4) 53', 56', 67', 70'; Boffelli (1/2) 74'; Pen: Miotti (1/1) 11' | Report | Try: Duque 5' c Con: Duque (1/1) 6' |

Estadio Agustín Pichot, Ushuaia
Attendance: 3,500
Referee: Claudio Cativelli (Uruguay)

| FB | 15 | Juan Cruz González | | (substituted off) 40' |
| RW | 14 | Germán Schulz |
| OC | 13 | Segundo Tuculet |
| IC | 12 | Tomás Granella |
| LW | 11 | Franco Cuaranta |
| FH | 10 | Domingo Miotti | | (substituted off) 51' |
| SH | 9 | Sebastián Cancelliere | | (substituted off) 60' |
| N8 | 8 | Tomás de la Vega | | (substituted off) 60' |
| OF | 7 | Lautaro Bavaro (c) |
| BF | 6 | Mariano Romanini |
| RL | 5 | Ignacio Larrague |
| LL | 4 | Pedro Ortega | | (substituted off) 60' |
| TP | 3 | Alejo Brem | | (substituted off) 45' |
| HK | 2 | Marcelo Brandi | | (substituted off) 51' |
| LP | 1 | Franco Brarda | | (substituted off) 51' |
Replacements:
| HK | 16 | Gaspar Baldunciel | | (substituted on) 51' |
| PR | 17 | Facundo Gigena | | (substituted on) 51' |
| PR | 18 | Santiago Medrano | (yellow card) 58' to 68' | (substituted on) 45' |
| LK | 19 | Franco Molina | | (substituted on) 60' |
| N8 | 20 | Rodrigo Bruni | | (substituted on) 60' |
| SH | 21 | Lauaro Bazán | | (substituted on) 60' |
| CE | 22 | Juan Cappiello | | (substituted on) 51' |
| WG | 23 | Emiliano Boffelli | | (substituted on) 40' |
Coach:
(Argentina) Felipe Contepomi

| FB | 15 | Daniel Sancery |
| RW | 14 | Ariel Rodrigues |
| OC | 13 | Felipe Sancery | | (substituted off) 71' |
| IC | 12 | Moisés Duque |
| LW | 11 | De Wet van Niekerk | | (substituted off) 20' |
| FH | 10 | Josh Reeves |
| SH | 9 | Matheus Cruz |
| N8 | 8 | Nick Smith (c) | (yellow card) 13' to 23' | (substituted off) 48' |
| OF | 7 | André Arruda |
| BF | 6 | João Luiz da Ros | (yellow card) 77' to 80' |
| RL | 5 | Diego López | | (substituted off) 48' |
| LL | 4 | Gabriel Paganini | (yellow card) 42' to 52' |
| TP | 3 | Caíque Silva | | (substituted off) 28' |
| HK | 2 | Yan Rosetti | | (substituted off) 75' |
| LP | 1 | Wilton Rebolo | | (substituted off) 78' |
Replacements:
| HK | 16 | Daniel Danielewicz | | (substituted on) 75' |
| PR | 17 | Vitor Ancina | | (substituted on) 28' |
| PR | 18 | Pedro Bengaló | | (substituted on) 78' |
| LK | 19 | Lucas Piero | | (substituted on) 48' |
| FL | 20 | Matheus Daniel | | (substituted on) 48' |
| SH | 21 | Beukes Cremer |
| CE | 22 | Luan Smanio | | (substituted on) 71' |
| WG | 23 | Robert Tenório | | (substituted on) 20' |
Coach:
(Argentina) Rodolfo Ambrosio

Touch judges:
Damián Schneider (Argentina)
Pablo de Luca (Argentina)

Notes:

- First international test played in Tierra del Fuego by an Argentinean national side.

25 February 2017
20:00 UYT (UTC-03)

| Uruguay | 17–13 | Canada (1 BP) |
| Try: Leivas 19' c Penalty try 26' c Con: Albanell (2/2) 20', 27'; Pen: Albanell (1/3) 11' | Report | Try: Trainor 75' c Con: Staller (1/1) 76'; Pen: McRorie (2/2) 4', 50' |

Estadio Domingo Burgueño, Maldonado
Attendance: 1,800
Referee: Derek Summers (United States)

| FB | 15 | Rodrigo Silva |
| RW | 14 | Leandro Leivas |
| OC | 13 | Juan Manuel Cat | | (substituted off) 61' |
| IC | 12 | Andrés Vilaseca |
| LW | 11 | Nicolás Freitas |
| FH | 10 | Germán Albanell | (yellow card) 49' to 59' |
| SH | 9 | Santiago Arata | | (substituted off) 56' |
| N8 | 8 | Alejandro Nieto |
| OF | 7 | Franco Lammana | (yellow card) 73' to 80' |
| BF | 6 | Juan Manuel Gaminara (c) | | (substituted off) 65' |
| RL | 5 | Diego Ayala | | (substituted off) 66' |
| LL | 4 | Ignacio Dotti |
| TP | 3 | Juan Echeverría | | (substituted off) 51' |
| HK | 2 | Martín Espiga |
| LP | 1 | Mateo Sanguinetti | | (substituted off) 59' |
Replacements:
| HK | 16 | Facundo Gattas | | (substituted on) 59' |
| PR | 17 | Matías Benítez |
| PR | 18 | Mario Sagario | | (substituted on) 51' |
| FL | 19 | Juan Diego Ormaechea | | (substituted on) 65' |
| LK | 20 | Diego Magno | | (substituted on) 66' |
| SH | 21 | Guillermo Lijtenstein | | (substituted on) 56' |
| WG | 22 | Gastón Gibernau |
| FB | 23 | Gastón Mieres | | (substituted on) 61' |
Coach:
(Argentina) Esteban Meneses

| FB | 15 | Brock Staller | (yellow card) 25' to 35' |
| RW | 14 | Dan Moor |
| OC | 13 | Conor Trainor | 25' to 28' |
| IC | 12 | Nick Blevins |
| LW | 11 | Kainoa Lloyd | | (substituted off) 69' |
| FH | 10 | Robbie Povey | | (substituted off) 40' |
| SH | 9 | Gordon McRorie (c) | | (substituted off) 59' |
| N8 | 8 | Admir Cejvanovic |
| OF | 7 | Lucas Rumball |
| BF | 6 | Clay Panga | | (substituted off) 61' |
| RL | 5 | Reegan O'Gorman | | (substituted off) 56' |
| LL | 4 | Brett Beukeboom |
| TP | 3 | Matt Tierney |
| HK | 2 | Ray Barkwill |
| LP | 1 | Rob Brouwer | | (substituted off) 69' |
Replacements:
| HK | 16 | Eric Howard |
| PR | 17 | Djustice Sears-Duru | | (substituted on) 69' |
| PR | 18 | Cole Keith |
| LK | 19 | Liam Chisholm | | (substituted on) 56' |
| LK | 20 | Matt Beukeboom | | (substituted on) 61' |
| SH | 21 | Phil Mack | | (substituted on) 59' |
| FH | 22 | Gradyn Bowd | | (substituted on) 40' |
| FH | 23 | Giuseppe du Toit | (substituted on) 25' (substituted off) 28' | (substituted on) 69' |
Coach:
(New Zealand) Mark Anscombe

Touch judges:
Joaquín Montes (Uruguay)
Rodrigo Goyret (Uruguay)

Notes:

- Kainoa Lloyd made his international debut for Canada.
- This was Uruguay' largest winning margin over Canada, surpassing their only ever other victory of Canada (25–23) set in 2002.

=== Week 5 ===
3 March 2017
19:15 BRST (UTC-02)

| Brazil | 24–23 | Canada (1 BP) |
| Try: D. Sancery 10' c M. Duque 37' c Tranquez 78'; Con: M. Duque (3/3) 11', 38', 79'; Pen: M. Duque (1/1) 16' | Report | Try: Blevins 13' c McRorie 26' c Con: McRorie (2/2) 14', 27'; Pen: McRorie (2/3) 48', 55'; Drop: McRorie (1/1) 66' |

Pacaembu Stadium, São Paulo
Attendance: 900
Referee: Damián Schneider (Argentina)

| FB | 15 | Daniel Sancery |
| RW | 14 | Ariel Rodrigues |
| OC | 13 | Felipe Sancery |
| IC | 12 | Moisés Duque |
| LW | 11 | Luca Tranquez |
| FH | 10 | Josh Reeves |
| SH | 9 | Lucas Duque |
| N8 | 8 | Nick Smith (c) |
| OF | 7 | Arthur Bergo |
| BF | 6 | André Arruda |
| RL | 5 | Luis Vieira | | (substituted off) 74' |
| LL | 4 | Lucas Piero | | (substituted off) 45' |
| TP | 3 | Pedro Bengaló | | (substituted off) 45' |
| HK | 2 | Yan Rosetti |
| LP | 1 | Jonatas Paulo | | (substituted off) 38' |
Replacements:
| HK | 16 | Luan Almeida |
| PR | 17 | Wilton Rebolo | | (substituted on) 38' |
| PR | 18 | Matheu Rocha | | (substituted on) 45' |
| LK | 19 | Diego López | (yellow card) 72' to 80' | (substituted on) 45' |
| FL | 20 | João Luiz da Ros | | (substituted on) 74' |
| SH | 21 | Matheus Cruz |
| CE | 22 | Matheus Cláudio |
| WG | 23 | Stefano Giantorno |
Coach:
(Argentina) Rodolfo Ambrosio

| FB | 15 | Giuseppe du Toit |
| RW | 14 | Dan Moor |
| OC | 13 | Conor Trainor |
| IC | 12 | Nick Blevins |
| LW | 11 | Rory McDonell |
| FH | 10 | Gradyn Bowd | | (substituted off) 49' |
| SH | 9 | Gordon McRorie (c) |
| N8 | 8 | Admir Cejvanovic |
| OF | 7 | Lucas Rumball |
| BF | 6 | Matt Beukeboom |
| RL | 5 | Liam Chisholm | | (substituted off) 64' |
| LL | 4 | Brett Beukeboom | (yellow card) 72' to 80' |
| TP | 3 | Matt Tierney |
| HK | 2 | Eric Howard | | (substituted off) 49' |
| LP | 1 | Rob Brouwer | | (substituted off) 53' |
Replacements:
| HK | 16 | Ray Barkwill | | (substituted on) 49' |
| PR | 17 | Djustice Sears-Duru | | (substituted on) 53' |
| PR | 18 | Cole Keith |
| LK | 19 | Reegan O'Gorman | | (substituted on) 64' |
| N8 | 20 | Clay Panga |
| SH | 21 | Phil Mack | | (substituted on) 49' |
| CE | 22 | George Barton |
| FB | 23 | Brock Staller |
Coach:
(New Zealand) Mark Anscombe

Touch judges:
Ricardo Sant'Anna (Brazil)
Murilo Bragotto (Brazil)

Notes:

- This was Brazil's first ever victory over Canada.

4 March 2017
16:00 UYT (UTC-03)

| Uruguay (1 BP) | 45–14 | Chile |
| Try: Echeverría 27' c Leivas (2) 32' c, 36' c N. Freitas (2) 53' c, 67' c Magno 63' c Con: Albanell (4/4) 28', 33', 37', 54'; Silva (2/2) 64', 68'; Pen: Albanell (1/1) 22' | Report | Try: Bursic 79' m Pen: Moller (2/3) 20', 39'; Ianiszewski (1/1) 31' |

Estadio Charrúa, Montevideo
Attendance: 5,300
Referee: Kurt Weaver (United States)

| FB | 15 | Rodrigo Silva | | (substituted off) 69' |
| RW | 14 | Leandro Leivas |
| OC | 13 | Juan Manuel Cat |
| IC | 12 | Andrés Vilaseca | | (substituted off) 64' |
| LW | 11 | Nicolás Freitas |
| FH | 10 | Germán Albanell | | (substituted off) 57' |
| SH | 9 | Guillermo Lijtenstein |
| N8 | 8 | Alejandro Nieto | | (substituted off) 57' |
| OF | 7 | Rodolfo Garese |
| BF | 6 | Juan Manuel Gaminara (c) |
| RL | 5 | Diego Magno |
| LL | 4 | Ignacio Dotti | | (substituted off) 64' |
| TP | 3 | Juan Echeverría | | (substituted off) 52' |
| HK | 2 | Martín Espiga | | (substituted off) 69' |
| LP | 1 | Mateo Sanguinetti | | (substituted off) 64' |
Replacements:
| HK | 16 | Facundo Gattas | | (substituted on) 64' |
| PR | 17 | Matías Benítez | | (substituted on) 69' |
| PR | 18 | Mario Sagario | (red card) 79' | (substituted on) 52' |
| LK | 19 | Diego Ayala | | (substituted on) 64' |
| FL | 20 | Gonzalo Soto | | (substituted on) 57' |
| FH | 21 | Lucas Durán | | (substituted on) 69' |
| FB | 22 | Gastón Mieres | | (substituted on) 57' |
| CE | 23 | Juan de Freitas | (yellow card) 76' to 80' | (substituted on) 57' |
Coach:
(Argentina) Esteban Meneses

| FB | 15 | Rodrigo Fernández | | (substituted off) 61' |
| RW | 14 | Mauricio Urrutia |
| OC | 13 | José Ignacio Larenas |
| IC | 12 | Ricardo Sifri | | (substituted off) 64' |
| LW | 11 | Tomás Ianiszewski | (yellow card) 62' to 72' |
| FH | 10 | Francisco González Moller | (yellow card) 21' to 31' |
| SH | 9 | Juan Pablo Larenas | | (substituted off) 55' |
| N8 | 8 | Benjamín Soto | | (substituted off) 59' |
| OF | 7 | Anton Petrowitsch |
| BF | 6 | Cristobál Niedmann | | (substituted off) 52' |
| RL | 5 | Nikola Bursic |
| LL | 4 | Mario Mayol |
| TP | 3 | José Tomás Munita | | (substituted off) 64' |
| HK | 2 | Manuel Garruchaga (c) |
| LP | 1 | Claudio Zamorano | | (substituted off) 47' |
Replacements:
| HK | 16 | Rodrigo Moya |
| PR | 17 | Vittorio Lastra | | (substituted on) 47' |
| PR | 18 | Lucas Bordigoni | | (substituted on) 64' |
| FL | 19 | Manuel Dagnino | | (substituted on) 59' |
| FL | 20 | Arturo Seeman | | (substituted on) 52' |
| SH | 21 | Sergio Bascuñán | | (substituted on) 55' |
| FH | 22 | Jorge Castillo | | (substituted on) 64' |
| WG | 23 | Martín Fernández | | (substituted on) 61' |
Coach:
(France) Bernard Charreyre

Touch judges:
Claudio Cattivelli (Uruguay)
Martín Bangueses (Uruguay)

Notes:

- Diego Magno surpassed Rodrigo Sánchez' record of 67 caps to become Uruguay's most capped player with 68 caps.

4 March 2017
17:40 ART (UTC-03)

| Argentina XV | 27–27 | United States (1 BP) |
| Try: Penalty try (2) 40' c, 53' c Ascárate 63' c Con: Miotti (3/3) 40', 54', 64'; Pen: Miotti (2/2) 7', 56' | Report | Try: Magie 29' m Tameilau (2) 37' c, 80' c Dolan 74' m Con: Cima (2/4) 38', 80'; Pen: Cima (1/2) 15' |

Estadio Municipal, Comodoro Rivadavia
Attendance: 9,000
Referee: Joaquín Montes (Uruguay)

| FB | 15 | Gabriel Ascárate | | (substituted off) 71' |
| RW | 14 | Germán Schulz |
| OC | 13 | Santiago Álvarez | | (substituted off) 54' |
| IC | 12 | Bruno Devoto |
| LW | 11 | Julian Dominguez |
| FH | 10 | Domingo Miotti |
| SH | 9 | Sebastián Cancelliere | (yellow card) 45' to 55' | (substituted off) 57' |
| N8 | 8 | Tomás de la Vega |
| OF | 7 | Lautaro Bavaro (c) |
| BF | 6 | Francisco Gorrissen | | (substituted off) 73' |
| RL | 5 | Ignacio Larrague |
| LL | 4 | Pedro Ortega | | (substituted off) 66' |
| TP | 3 | Santiago Medrano | | (substituted off) 69' |
| HK | 2 | Gaspar Baldunciel | | (substituted off) 46' |
| LP | 1 | Francisco Ferronato | | (substituted off) 60' |
Replacements:
| HK | 16 | Marcelo Brandi | | (substituted on) 46' |
| PR | 17 | Eduardo Bello | | (substituted on) 60' |
| PR | 18 | Nicolás Solveyra | | (substituted on) 69' |
| LK | 19 | Franco Molina | | (substituted on) 66' |
| N8 | 20 | Santiago Montagner | | (substituted on) 73' |
| SH | 21 | Lauaro Bazán | | (substituted on) 57' |
| FH | 22 | Juan Cruz González | | (substituted on) 54' |
| WG | 23 | Franco Cuaranta | | (substituted on) 71' |
Coach:
(Argentina) Felipe Contepomi

| FB | 15 | Ben Cima |
| RW | 14 | Mike Te'o | (yellow card) 40' to 50' |
| OC | 13 | Bryce Campbell |
| IC | 12 | JP Eloff | | (substituted off) 66' |
| LW | 11 | Nate Augspurger (c) |
| FH | 10 | Will Magie |
| SH | 9 | Shaun Davies | | (substituted off) 71' |
| N8 | 8 | Cam Dolan |
| OF | 7 | Tony Lamborn |
| BF | 6 | John Quill | | (substituted off) 64' |
| RL | 5 | Siaosi Mahoni | | (substituted off) 25' |
| LL | 4 | Matthew Jensen |
| TP | 3 | Chris Baumann | | (substituted off) 57' |
| HK | 2 | James Hilterbrand | | (substituted off) 46' |
| LP | 1 | Anthony Purpura | | (substituted off) 57' |
Replacements:
| HK | 16 | Peter Malcolm | | (substituted on) 46' |
| PR | 17 | Ben Tarr | | (substituted on) 57' |
| PR | 18 | Olive Kilifi | | (substituted on) 57' |
| FL | 19 | Hanco Germishuys | | (substituted on) 64' |
| N8 | 20 | David Tameilau | (yellow card) 44' to 54' | (substituted on) 25' |
| CE | 21 | Calvin Whiting | | (substituted on) 66' |
| CE | 22 | Ryan Matyas | | (substituted on) 64' |
| WG | 23 | Spike Davis | | (substituted on) 71' |
Coach:
(New Zealand) John Mitchell

Touch judges:
Santiago Altobelli (Argentina)
José Covassi (Argentina)

== Statistics ==
=== Top points scorers ===
| Pos | Name | Team | Pts |
|---|---|---|---|
| 1 | Ben Cima | United States | 43 |
| 1 | Moisés Duque | Brazil | 43 |
| 3 | Domingo Miotti | Argentina XV | 42 |
| 4 | Gordon McRorie | Canada | 41 |
| 5 | Germán Albanell | Uruguay | 36 |
| 6 | Sebastián Cancelliere | Argentina XV | 25 |
| 6 | Taylor Paris | Canada | 25 |
| 8 | Tony Lamborn | United States | 20 |
| 8 | Fernando Luna | Argentina XV | 20 |
| 8 | Mike Te'o | United States | 20 |
| 11 | Francisco González Moller | Chile | 17 |
| 12 | Cam Dolan | United States | 15 |
| 12 | Leandro Leivas | Uruguay | 15 |
| 12 | David Tameilau | United States | 15 |

=== Top try scorers ===
| Pos | Name | Team | Tries |
|---|---|---|---|
| 1 | Sebastián Cancelliere | Argentina XV | 5 |
| 1 | Taylor Paris | Canada | 5 |
| 3 | Tony Lamborn | United States | 4 |
| 3 | Mike Te'o | United States | 4 |
| 5 | Cam Dolan | United States | 3 |
| 5 | Leandro Leivas | Uruguay | 3 |
| 5 | David Tameilau | United States | 3 |
| 8 | 15 Players | | 2 |

== Attendances (2016-2017) ==
=== Top 5 ===
| | Season | Game | Home team | Visitor | Attendance | Sources |
|---|---|---|---|---|---|---|
| 1 | 2016 | 1 | United States | Argentina | 10,241 | |
| 2 | 2017 | 5 | Argentina | United States | 9,000 | |
| 3 | 2016 | 2 | Argentina | Chile | 8,500 | |
| 4 | 2016 | 2 | United States | Canada | 7,145 | |
| 5 | 2017 | 2 | United States | Brazil | 6,091 | |

=== Average home attendances ===
| Pos | Team | GP | Total | High | Low | Average |
|---|---|---|---|---|---|---|
| 1 | United States | 5 | 31,578 | 10,241 | 3,000 | 6,316 |
| 2 | Argentina | 5 | 30,000 | 9,000 | 3,000 | 6,000 |
| 3 | Uruguay | 5 | 18,400 | 6,000 | 1,800 | 3,680 |
| 4 | Brazil | 5 | 15,099 | 3,798 | 900 | 3,020 |
| 5 | Chile | 5 | 12,447 | 5,000 | 900 | 2,489 |
| 6 | Canada | 5 | 9,913 | 3,416 | 1,123 | 1,983 |

== Table (2016-2017) ==
| Pos | Nation | Games | | | | Points | | | Tries | Bonus points | | Table points |
| Pos | Nation | Played | Won | Drawn | Lost | For | Against | Diff | Tries | 4 tries | 7 Pts loss | Table points |
|---|---|---|---|---|---|---|---|---|---|---|---|---|
| 1 | Argentina XV | 10 | 8 | 2 | 0 | 422 | 195 | +227 | 59 | 8 | 0 | 44 |
| 2 | United States | 10 | 6 | 2 | 2 | 405 | 172 | +233 | 56 | 6 | 2 | 36 |
| 3 | Uruguay | 10 | 6 | 0 | 4 | 243 | 256 | –13 | 30 | 3 | 2 | 29 |
| 4 | Canada | 10 | 4 | 0 | 6 | 304 | 266 | +38 | 38 | 5 | 2 | 23 |
| 5 | Brazil | 10 | 3 | 0 | 7 | 170 | 354 | –184 | 17 | 0 | 2 | 14 |
| 6 | Chile | 10 | 1 | 0 | 9 | 124 | 425 | –301 | 9 | 0 | 1 | 5 |
