= 2019 Rugby World Cup – Americas qualification =

Tournament details
- Dates: 5 March 2016 – 3 February 2018
- No. of nations: 21

Tournament statistics
- Matches played: 38

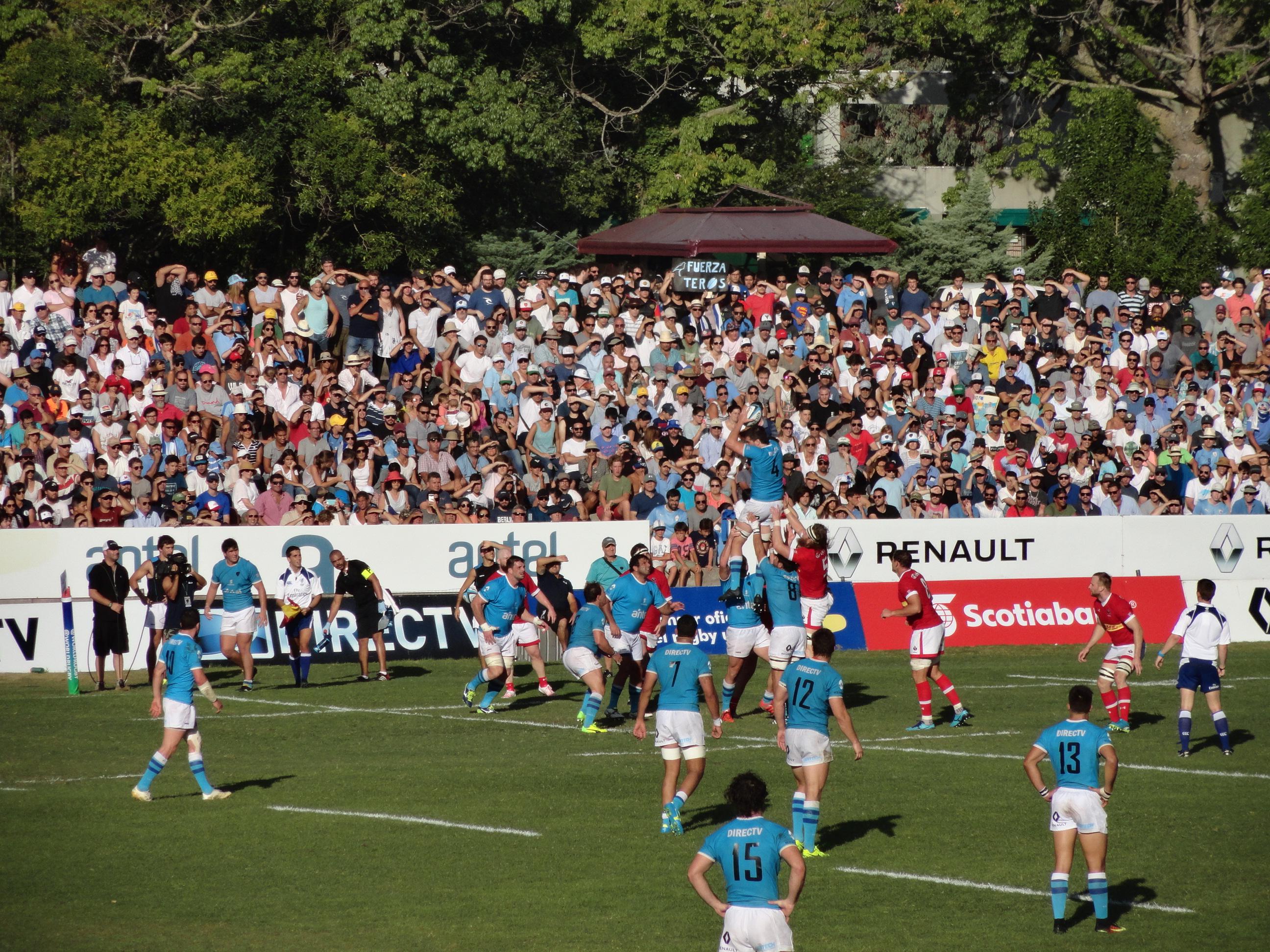
Americas play-off match between Uruguay and Canada

Qualifying for the 2019 Rugby World Cup for the Americas began in March 2016, where across 3 years, 20 teams competed for two direct qualification spots into the final tournament, and one spot in the Repechage tournament. For qualification purposes, the two Americas regions Rugby Americas North and Sudamérica Rugby formed the Americas region to compete for the two Americas berths in the World Cup.

One team in the Americas zone, Argentina, qualified automatically after reaching the semi-finals of the 2015 World Cup. The United States and Uruguay qualified as Americas 1 and Americas 2 respectively, while Canada moved to the Repechage tournament.

== Format ==
The qualification process for the Americas region was a four-round process, the same process used for the 2015 Americas qualification.

Round 1 took place in 2016. Two pre-existing competitions, the Rugby Americas North Championship and the South American Rugby Championship Division B served as qualification tournaments, designated as Round 1A and Round 1B respectively. Round 1A was formed by the nine World Rugby members in RAN who were separated into two zones, a south and north zone. The bottom placed team from the 2015 tournament, Saint Vincent and the Grenadines had to play the returning team to the tournament, Jamaica, to earn the right to compete in the main tournament, with the winner of the qualifier match joining the south zone. The winners of each zone then competed in the Championship final, who thereby progressed to the Round 1 final. The other round 1 finalist was the winner of Round 1B, the 2016 South American Rugby Championship "B", where the winner of Round 1 advanced through to Round 2.

Round 2 also took place in 2016, with the 2016 South American Rugby Championship "A" forming Round 2A. The team placed bottom at the end of the Championship, played the winner of Round 1 in a promotion/relegation playoff to earn a place in the 2017 CONSUR Rugby Championship "A" competition and progress to Round 3.

Round 3 took place in 2017, with the top Sudamérica Rugby division, 2017 South American Rugby Championship "A", forming Round 3A. The winner of that round, advanced to Round 4. Round 3B was formed by a home-and-away play-off series between the top two non-automatic Americas qualifiers, Canada and the United States, where the winner of the play-off series qualified for the World Cup as Americas 1. The loser advanced to Round 4.

Round 4 took place in early 2018, matching the winner of Round 3A and the loser of 3B against each other in a home and away play-off. The winner of this round on aggregate, qualified as Americas 2. The loser moved to the Repechage tournament as Americas 3 for a second chance to qualify.

== Entrants ==
Twenty teams competed for the 2019 Rugby World Cup – Americas qualification; teams world rankings are prior to the first Americas qualification match on 5 March 2016 and bold nations denotes teams have previously played in a Rugby World Cup.

Nation	Rank	Zone	Began play	Qualifying status
Argentina	5	South America	N/A	Qualified with Top 12 finish at 2015 World Cup
Bahamas	86	North America	7 May 2016	Eliminated by Cayman Islands on 21 May 2016
Barbados	75	North America	23 April 2016	Eliminated by Trinidad and Tobago on 21 May 2016
Bermuda	67	North America	21 May 2016	Eliminated by Cayman Islands on 18 June 2016
Brazil	38	South America	23 April 2016	Eliminated by Uruguay on 20 May 2017
Canada	19	North America	24 June 2017	Advanced to the Repechage as Americas 3
Cayman Islands	61	North America	21 May 2016	Eliminated by Mexico on 2 July 2016
Chile	27	South America	23 April 2016	Eliminated by Uruguay on 27 May 2017
Colombia	47	South America	2 October 2016	Eliminated by Paraguay on 19 November 2016
Ecuador	NR	South America	27 August 2016	Eliminated by Venezuela on 5 October 2016
Guatemala	NR	South America	27 August 2016	Eliminated by Ecuador on 27 August 2016
Guyana	54	North America	23 April 2016	Eliminated by Mexico on 1 October 2016
Jamaica	78	North America	5 March 2016	Eliminated by Guyana on 21 May 2016
Mexico	56	North America	7 May 2016	Eliminated by Colombia on 29 October 2016
Paraguay	37	South America	23 April 2016	Eliminated by Chile on 20 May 2017
Peru	78	South America	2 October 2016	Eliminated by Colombia on 5 October 2016
St Vincent and the Grenadines	79	North America	5 March 2016	Eliminated by Jamaica on 5 March 2016
Trinidad and Tobago	44	North America	23 April 2016	Eliminated by Guyana on 18 June 2016
Uruguay	20	South America	23 April 2016	Qualified by defeating Canada on 3 February 2018
United States	17	North America	24 June 2017	Qualified by defeating Canada on 1 July 2017
Venezuela	68	South America	2 October 2016	Eliminated by Colombia on 8 October 2016

== Round 1 ==
=== Round 1A: 2016 Rugby Americas North Championship ===
The qualifying match between Jamaica and St Vincent and the Grenadines was the first qualifying match for the 2019 tournament, three-and-a-half years before the start of the tournament. Jamaica defeated St Vincent and the Grenadines 48–0, eliminating them from qualifying. The match was played in front of a record crowd of 1,000 at Arnos Vale Sports Complex, and was refereed by Nigel Owens who had refereed the 2015 Rugby World Cup final. The victory boosted Jamaica to a World Rugby ranking of 72, their highest ever.

==== Qualifier ====
5 March 2016
13:00

St Vincent and the Grenadines	0–48	Jamaica
	Match centre

Arnos Vale Stadium, Arnos Vale
Attendance: 1,000
Referee: Nigel Owens (Wales)

==== North Zone ====
Advances to Championship final

Rank	Team	Games				Points			Bonus Points	Table Points
Rank	Team	Played	Won	Drawn	Lost	For	Against	Diff	Bonus Points	Table Points
1	Mexico	3	3	0	0	148	37	+111	3	15
2	Cayman Islands	3	2	0	1	91	53	+38	1	9
3	Bermuda	3	1	0	2	51	135	–84	1	5
4	Bahamas	3	0	0	3	24	89	–65	1	0
Points were awarded to the teams as follows: Win - 4 points Draw - 1 points 4 or more tries - 1 point Loss within 7 points - 1 point Loss greater than 7 points - 0 points

Matches

7 May 2016
16:00

Bahamas	3–39	Mexico (1 BP)
	Match centre

Winton Rugby Field, Nassau

21 May 2016
18:00

Cayman Islands	20–8	Bahamas
	Match centre

Truman Bodden Sports Complex, George Town
Attendance: 1,050
Referee: Jamie Baum (Bermuda)

21 May 2016
14:00

(1 BP) Mexico	75–10	Bermuda
	Match centre Report

Universidad Iberoamericana, Mexico City
Attendance: 450
Referee: Harry Mason (Canada)

4 June 2016
16:30

(1 BP) Bermuda	30–13	Bahamas
	Match centre Report

National Sports Center, Hamilton
Referee: Justin Colgan (Cayman Islands)

18 June 2016
19:00

(1 BP) Cayman Islands	47–11	Bermuda
	Match centre Report

Truman Bodden Sports Complex, George Town
Attendance: 1,100
Referee: Miles McIvor (United States)

2 July 2016
14:00

(1 BP) Mexico	34–24	Cayman Islands
	Match centre Report

Campo De Rugby, Dos Ríos, Mexico
Attendance: 650
Referee: Shaun Bastic (United States)

==== South Zone ====
Advances to Championship final

Rank	Team	Games				Points			Bonus Points	Table Points
Rank	Team	Played	Won	Drawn	Lost	For	Against	Diff	Bonus Points	Table Points
1	Guyana	3	3	0	0	93	40	+53	2	14
2	Trinidad and Tobago	3	2	0	1	91	41	+48	3	11
3	Barbados	3	1	0	2	22	87	–65	0	4
4	Jamaica	3	0	0	3	19	57	–38	0	0
Points were awarded to the teams as follows: Win - 4 points Draw - 1 points 4 or more tries - 1 point Loss within 7 points - 1 point Loss greater than 7 points - 0 points

Matches

23 April 2016
15:00

(1 BP) Guyana	48–17	Barbados
	Match centre

Providence National Stadium, Georgetown
Referee: Haylee Slaughter (United States)

23 April 2016
15:00

(1 BP) Trinidad and Tobago	34–14	Jamaica
	Match centre

St Mary's College Ground, Port of Spain
Referee: Jorge Rodriguez (Mexico)

21 May 2016
15:30

Barbados	5–39	Trinidad and Tobago (1 BP)
	Match centre

Garrison Savannah, Bridgetown
Referee: John Stevens (United States)

21 May 2016
16:00

(1 BP) Guyana	23–5	Jamaica
	Match centre

Providence National Stadium, Georgetown
Referee: Michael Jones (Canada)

18 June 2016

Jamaica	^{1}	Barbados

Referee: Antonio Magallanes (Mexico)

^{1}Jamaica forfeited their match due to a lack of available players.

18 June 2016
16:00

(1 BP) Trinidad and Tobago	18–22	Guyana
	Match centre Report

Hasely Crawford Stadium, Port of Spain
Referee: David Sherwin (Cayman Islands)

==== Championship final ====
Mexico, as winners, advance to the Round 1 final.

1 October 2016
14:00

Mexico	32–3	Guyana

Estadio Roberto Tapatío Méndez, Mexico City
Referee: Jim Rogers (United States)

=== Round 1B: 2016 CONSUR Rugby Championship B ===
==== Qualifier ====
27 August 2016
15:00

Ecuador	26–25	Guatemala

Estadio Alberto Spencer Herrera, Guayaquil
Referee: Henrique Platais (Brazil)

==== 2016 CONSUR Rugby Championship B ====
The 2016 South American Rugby Championship "B" was held in October 2016 and hosted by Peru in Lima.

Advances to Round 1 Final

Place	Nation (rank)	Games				Points			Table points
Place	Nation (rank)	Played	Won	Drawn	Lost	For	Against	Diff	Table points
1	Colombia	3	3	0	0	151	29	120	9
2	Venezuela	3	2	0	1	95	53	44	6
3	Peru	3	1	0	2	87	79	8	3
4	Ecuador	3	0	0	3	20	192	-172	0
Points were awarded to the teams as follows: Win-3 points; Draw-1 point

Matches

2 October 2016
14:00

Ecuador	5–75	Colombia

Estadio Niño Héroe Manuel Bonilla, Lima
Referee: Martín Bangueses (Uruguay)

2 October 2016
16:00

Peru	8–33	Venezuela

Estadio Niño Héroe Manuel Bonilla, Lima
Referee: Martín Pettina (Argentina)

5 October 2016
14:00

Venezuela	52–10	Ecuador

Estadio Niño Héroe Manuel Bonilla, Lima
Referee: Francisco Saavedra (Chile)

5 October 2016
16:00

Colombia	41–14	Peru

Estadio Niño Héroe Manuel Bonilla, Lima
Referee: Martín Bangueses (Uruguay)

8 October 2016
14:00

Peru	60–5	Ecuador

Estadio Niño Héroe Manuel Bonilla, Lima
Referee: Francisco Saavedra (Chile)

8 October 2016
16:00

Venezuela	10–35	Colombia

Estadio Niño Héroe Manuel Bonilla, Lima
Referee: Martín Pettina (Argentina)

=== Round 1 Final ===
Colombia, as winners, advance to the round 2 final.

29 October 2016
15:00

Colombia	29–11	Mexico

Estadio Cincuentenario, Medellín

== Round 2 ==
=== Round 2A: 2016 CONSUR Rugby Championship "A" ===
Advances to Round 3A
Advances to Round 2 Final

Place	Nation (rank)	Games				Points			Table points
Place	Nation (rank)	Played	Won	Drawn	Lost	For	Against	Diff	Table points
1	Uruguay	3	3	0	0	135	43	+92	9
2	Chile	3	1	1	1	102	66	+36	4
3	Brazil	3	1	1	1	66	77	–11	4
4	Paraguay	3	0	0	3	43	160	–117	0
Points were awarded to the teams as follows: Win-3 points; Draw-1 point

Matches

23 April 2016
16:20

Brazil	14–36	Uruguay
	Report

Allianz Parque, São Paulo
Attendance: 7,692
Referee: Juan Sylvestre (Argentina)

23 April 2016
16:00

Chile	68–7	Paraguay
	Report

Old Grangonian Club, Santiago
Referee: Damian Schneider (Argentina)

30 April 2016
16:00

Paraguay	15–60	Uruguay
	Report

Parque Olímpico, Asunción
Referee: Henrique Platais (Brazil)

30 April 2016
16:20

Brazil	20–20	Chile
	Report

Pacaembu Stadium, São Paulo
Attendance: 7,270
Referee: Alejandro Longres (Uruguay)

7 May 2016
15:30

Uruguay	39–14	Chile
	Report

Estadio Charrúa, Montevideo
Attendance: 6,000
Referee: Juan Sylvestre (Argentina)

7 May 2016
15:30

Paraguay	21–32	Brazil
	Report

Parque Olímpico, Asunción
Referee: Claudio Cattivelli (Uruguay)

=== Round 2 Final ===
Paraguay, as winners, advance to round 3A.

19 November 2016
16:00

Paraguay	39–27	Colombia

Estadio Héroes de Curupayty, Luque
Referee: Joaquín Montes (Uruguay)

== Round 3 ==
=== Round 3A: 2017 CONSUR Rugby Championship "A" ===
Advances to Americas
Repechage play-off

Place	Nation (rank)	Games				Points			Table points
Place	Nation (rank)	Played	Won	Drawn	Lost	For	Against	Diff	Table points
1	Uruguay	3	3	0	0	113	57	+56	9
2	Chile	3	2	0	1	92	44	+48	6
3	Brazil	3	1	0	2	94	62	+32	3
4	Paraguay	3	0	0	3	32	168	–136	0
Points were awarded to the teams as follows: Win-3 points; Draw-1 point

Matches

13 May 2017
15:45

Chile	15–10	Brazil

Estadio Municipal de La Pintana, Santiago
Referee: Joaquín Montes (Uruguay)

13 May 2017
15:15

Paraguay	19–45	Uruguay

Estadio Héroes de Curupaytí, Asunción
Referee: Pablo de Luca (Argentina)

20 May 2017
15:45

Chile	66–7	Paraguay

Estadio de La Pintana, La Pintana
Referee: Henrique Platais (Brazil)

20 May 2017
15:30

Uruguay	41–27	Brazil

Estadio Charrúa, Montevideo
Referee: Juan Sylvestre (Argentina)

26 May 2017
21:00

Brazil	57–6	Paraguay

Pacaembu Stadium, São Paulo
Attendance: 3,200
Referee: Damian Schneider (Argentina)

27 May 2017
15:30

Uruguay	27–11	Chile

Estadio Charrúa, Montevideo
Attendance: 7,500
Referee: Federico Anselmi (Argentina)

=== Round 3B: United States v Canada Home & Away playoffs ===
The United States, as winners, qualify for the Rugby World Cup. Canada, as runners-up, qualify for the Americas repechage play-off.

24 June 2017
15:00 EDT (UTC-04)

Canada	28–28	United States
Try: van der Merwe (2) 6' c, 17' m Carpenter 69' c Con: O'Leary (2/3) 7', 69'; Pen: O'Leary (3/5) 25', 45', 77'	Report	Try: Civetta (2) 8' c, 35' c Te'o (2) 39' c, 52' c Con: MacGinty (4/4) 9', 36', 40', 52'

Tim Hortons Field, Hamilton
Attendance: 13,138
Referee: Ben Whitehouse (Wales)

Team details

FB	15	Ciaran Hearn
RW	14	Andrew Coe
OC	13	D. T. H. van der Merwe	17' to 22'
IC	12	Connor Braid			(substituted off) 57'
LW	11	Taylor Paris
FH	10	Shane O'Leary
SH	9	Phil Mack	(substituted off) 57'
N8	8	Tyler Ardron
OF	7	Matt Heaton
BF	6	Admir Cejvanovic	(substituted off) 55'
RL	5	Evan Olmstead
LL	4	Brett Beukeboom (c)
TP	3	Jake Ilnicki	(substituted off) 57'
HK	2	Ray Barkwill	(substituted off) 52'	(substituted in) 61'
LP	1	Djustice Sears-Duru	(substituted off) 75'
Replacements:
HK	16	Benoît Piffero	(substituted in) 52'	(substituted off) 61'
PR	17	Anthony Luca	(substituted in) 75'
PR	18	Matt Tierney	(substituted in) 57'
FL	19	Kyle Baillie
N8	20	Aaron Carpenter	(substituted in) 55'
SH	21	Gordon McRorie	(substituted in) 57'
CE	22	Nick Blevins	(substituted in) 17'	(substituted off) 22'	(substituted in) 57'
WG	23	Dan Moor
Coach:
(New Zealand) Mark Anscombe

FB	15	Ben Cima		(substituted off) 49'
RW	14	Mike Te'o
OC	13	Bryce Campbell
IC	12	Marcel Brache
LW	11	Matai Leuta
FH	10	AJ MacGinty
SH	9	Nate Augspurger
N8	8	Cam Dolan	(yellow card) 57'
OF	7	John Quill
BF	6	Todd Clever (c)		(substituted off) 23'	(substituted in) 28'	(substituted off) 49'
RL	5	Nick Civetta		(substituted off) 60'
LL	4	Ben Landry		(substituted off) 49'
TP	3	Paddy Ryan		(substituted off) 52'
HK	2	James Hilterbrand	(yellow card) 44'	(substituted off) 54'
LP	1	Anthony Purpura		(substituted off) 52'
Replacements:
HK	16	Peter Malcolm		(substituted in) 49'
PR	17	Ben Tarr		(substituted in) 52'
PR	18	Dino Waldren		(substituted in) 52'
LK	19	Matthew Jensen		(substituted in) 60'
N8	20	David Tameilau		(substituted in) 49'
FL	21	Andrew Durutalo		(substituted in) 23'	(substituted off) 28'	(substituted in) 49'
SH	22	Shaun Davies		(substituted in) 54'
FH	23	Will Magie
Coach:
(New Zealand) John Mitchell

Touch judges:
Andrew Brace (Ireland)
Shuhei Kubo (Japan)
Television match official:
Sean Davey (England)

Notes:

- D. T. H. van der Merwe surpassed Winston Stanley's record of 24 tries to become Canada's top try scorer.

1 July 2017
15:00 PDT (UTC-07)

United States	52–16	Canada
Try: Dolan (2) 9' m, 15' c Brakeley 21' c Taufete'e (2) 54' c, 61' c Augspurger 63' c Waldren 67' c Tameilau 78' m Con: MacGinty (6/7) 16', 22', 56', 62', 65', 68'	Report	Try: Cejvanovic 41' c Con: McRorie (1/1) 42'; Pen: McRorie (3/3) 19', 32', 40'

Torero Stadium, San Diego
Attendance: 5,000
Referee: Andrew Brace (Ireland)

Team details

FB	15	Madison Hughes
RW	14	Mike Te'o
OC	13	Bryce Campbell
IC	12	Marcel Brache
LW	11	Ryan Matyas
FH	10	AJ MacGinty		(substituted off) 72'
SH	9	Nate Augspurger		(substituted off) 69'
N8	8	Cam Dolan
OF	7	Tony Lamborn	(yellow card) 40'		(substituted off) 67'
BF	6	Todd Clever (c)		(substituted off) 61'	(substituted in) 67'
RL	5	Nick Civetta		(substituted off) 52'
LL	4	Nate Brakeley		(substituted off) 56'
TP	3	Chris Baumann		(substituted off) 22'
HK	2	James Hilterbrand		(substituted off) 50'
LP	1	Anthony Purpura		(substituted off) 40'
Replacements:
HK	16	Joe Taufete'e		(substituted in) 50'
PR	17	Ben Tarr		(substituted in) 40'
PR	18	Dino Waldren		(substituted in) 22'
N8	19	David Tameilau		(substituted in) 52'
FL	20	John Quill		(substituted in) 61'
FL	21	Andrew Durutalo		(substituted in) 56'
SH	22	Shaun Davies		(substituted in) 69'
FH	23	Will Magie		(substituted in) 72'
Coach:
(New Zealand) John Mitchell

FB	15	Ciaran Hearn
RW	14	Andrew Coe		(substituted off) 69'
OC	13	Nick Blevins
IC	12	Connor Braid		(substituted off) 74'
LW	11	Dan Moor
FH	10	Shane O'Leary
SH	9	Gordon McRorie		(substituted off) 74'
N8	8	Tyler Ardron	(yellow card) 60'
OF	7	Matt Heaton		(substituted off) 58'
BF	6	Admir Cejvanovic		(substituted off) 58'
RL	5	Evan Olmstead
LL	4	Brett Beukeboom (c)
TP	3	Jake Ilnicki		(substituted off) 59'
HK	2	Ray Barkwill		(substituted off) 58'
LP	1	Djustice Sears-Duru		(substituted off) 67'
Replacements:
HK	16	Benoît Piffero		(substituted in) 58'
PR	17	Anthony Luca		(substituted in) 67'
PR	18	Matt Tierney		(substituted in) 59'
FL	19	Kyle Baillie		(substituted in) 58'
N8	20	Aaron Carpenter		(substituted in) 58'
SH	21	Andrew Ferguson		(substituted in) 74'
CE	22	Giuseppe du Toit		(substituted in) 74'
WG	23	Sean Duke		(substituted in) 69'
Coach:
(New Zealand) Mark Anscombe

Touch judges:
Ben Whitehouse (Wales)
Shuhei Kubo (Japan)
Television match official:
Sean Davey (England)

Notes:

- This win means the US qualifies as the leading Americas nation for the first time, with previous attempts seeing them qualify as Americas 2 or 3.

== Round 4: Americas Repechage play-off ==
Uruguay, as winners, qualify for the Rugby World Cup, their second time without an international play-off (first time in 2003 qualifiers). Canada, as runners-up, qualify for the Repechage qualifying tournament.

27 January 2018
17:00 PST (UTC-08)

Canada	29–38	Uruguay
Try: Olmstead 17' c Van der Merwe 24' c Penalty try 46'; Blevins 71' m Con: Braid (2/2) 19', 25'; Pen: Braid (1/1) 22'	Report	Try: Silva 1' c Leivas 30' c Arata 40' c Dotti 51' c Capó Ortega 56' c Con: Berchesi (5/5) 2', 31', 40', 52', 57'; Pen: Berchesi (1/5) 75'

BC Place, Vancouver
Attendance: 16,132
Referee: Andrew Brace (Ireland)

Team details

FB	15	Taylor Paris
RW	14	Jeff Hassler	(substituted off) 20'	(substituted in) 28'
OC	13	Ben LeSage
IC	12	Nick Blevins
LW	11	D. T. H. van der Merwe
FH	10	Connor Braid	(substituted off) 32'
SH	9	Phil Mack (c)	(substituted off) 72'
N8	8	Tyler Ardron
OF	7	Matt Heaton	(substituted off) 75'
BF	6	Evan Olmstead
RL	5	Josh Larsen	(substituted off) 63'
LL	4	Brett Beukeboom
TP	3	Jake Ilnicki
HK	2	Ray Barkwill	(substituted off) 52'
LP	1	Hubert Buydens	(substituted off) 52'
Replacements:
HK	16	Benoît Piffero	(substituted in) 52'
PR	17	Djustice Sears-Duru	(substituted in) 52'
PR	18	Cole Keith
N8	19	Admir Cejvanovic	(substituted in) 75'
FL	20	Lucas Rumball	(substituted in) 63'
SH	21	Gordon McRorie	(substituted in) 72'
FH	22	Pat Parfrey	(substituted in) 32'
FB	23	Brock Staller	(substituted in) 20'	(substituted off) 28'
Coach:
(Wales) Kingsley Jones

FB	15	Rodrigo Silva
RW	14	Leandro Leivas		(substituted off) 61'
OC	13	Juan Manuel Cat		(substituted off) 64'
IC	12	Andrés Vilaseca
LW	11	Nicolás Freitas
FH	10	Felipe Berchesi
SH	9	Santiago Arata		(substituted off) 61'
N8	8	Alejandro Nieto
OF	7	Franco Lammana		(substituted off) 48'	(substituted in) 57'	(substituted off) 61'	(substituted in) 67'	(substituted off) 71'
BF	6	Juan Manuel Gaminara (c)					67' to 71'
RL	5	Rodrigo Capó Ortega		(substituted off) 57'	(substituted in) 61'	(substituted off) 63'
LL	4	Ignacio Dotti
TP	3	Mario Sagario		(substituted off) 64'
HK	2	Germán Kessler	(yellow card) 46'			(substituted off) 66'
LP	1	Mateo Sanguinetti		(substituted in) 66'
Replacements:
HK	16	Carlos Pombo		(substituted in) 48'	(substituted off) 57'	(substituted in) 66'
PR	17	Matías Benítez		(substituted in) 66'
PR	18	Juan Echeverría		(substituted in) 64'
LK	19	Manuel Leindekar		(substituted in) 57'	(substituted off) 61'	(substituted in) 63'
FL	20	Rodolfo Garese				(substituted in) 61'
SH	21	Agustín Ormaechea		(substituted in) 61'
FB	22	Gastón Mieres		(substituted in) 61'
CE	23	Joaquín Prada		(substituted in) 64'
Coach:
(Argentina) Esteban Meneses

Man of the Match:
Nicolás Freitas (Uruguay)

Touch judges:
Kurt Weaver (United States)
Derek Summers (United States)
Television match official:
Marc Nelson (United States)

Notes:

- This is the first time that Uruguay has beaten Canada in Canada.

3 February 2018
17:00 UYT (UTC-03)

Uruguay	32–31	Canada
Try: Dotti 32' c Cat 41' m Vilaseca (2) 64' c, 73' c Con: Berchesi (3/4) 33', 65', 74'; Pen: Berchesi (2/3) 36', 55'	Report	Try: van der Merwe (2) 11' m, 80' m Paris 24' c Sears-Duru 70' m Con: Staller (1/3) 25'; Pen: Staller (3/4) 6', 39', 53'

Estadio Charrúa, Montevideo
Attendance: 14,000
Referee: Luke Pearce (England)

Team details

FB	15	Rodrigo Silva
RW	14	Leandro Leivas	(substituted off) 77'
OC	13	Juan Manuel Cat	(substituted off) 71'
IC	12	Andrés Vilaseca
LW	11	Nicolás Freitas
FH	10	Felipe Berchesi
SH	9	Santiago Arata	(substituted off) 14'
N8	8	Alejandro Nieto	(substituted off) 77'
OF	7	Franco Lammana
BF	6	Juan Manuel Gaminara (c)
RL	5	Rodrigo Capó Ortega	(substituted off) 68'
LL	4	Ignacio Dotti
TP	3	Mario Sagario	(substituted off) 68'
HK	2	Germán Kessler	(substituted off) 76'
LP	1	Mateo Sanguinetti	(substituted off) 76'
Replacements:
HK	16	Carlos Pombo	(substituted in) 76'
PR	17	Matías Benítez	(substituted in) 76'
PR	18	Juan Echeverría	(substituted in) 68'
LK	19	Manuel Leindekar	(substituted in) 68'
FL	20	Rodolfo Garese	(substituted in) 77'
SH	21	Agustín Ormaechea	(substituted in) 14'
FB	22	Gastón Mieres	(substituted in) 77'
CE	23	Joaquín Prada	(substituted in) 71'
Coach:
(Argentina) Esteban Meneses

FB	15	Brock Staller
RW	14	Taylor Paris			(substituted off) 47'
OC	13	Ben LeSage
IC	12	Nick Blevins
LW	11	D. T. H. van der Merwe	26' to 30'
FH	10	Shane O'Leary
SH	9	Phil Mack (c)	(substituted off) 68'
N8	8	Tyler Ardron
OF	7	Matt Heaton	(substituted off) 75'
BF	6	Lucas Rumball
RL	5	Evan Olmstead
LL	4	Brett Beukeboom	(substituted off) 62'
TP	3	Jake Ilnicki	(substituted off) 39'	(substituted in) 55'
HK	2	Ray Barkwill	(substituted off) 62'
LP	1	Hubert Buydens	(substituted off) 61'
Replacements:
HK	16	Benoît Piffero	(substituted in) 62'
PR	17	Djustice Sears-Duru	(substituted in) 61'
PR	18	Cole Keith	(substituted in) 39'	(substituted off) 55'
LK	19	Kyle Baillie	(substituted in) 62'
N8	20	Admir Cejvanovic	(substituted in) 75'
SH	21	Gordon McRorie	(substituted in) 68'
FH	22	Pat Parfrey
WG	23	Kainoa Lloyd	(substituted in) 26'	(substituted off) 30'	(substituted in) 47'
Coach:
(Wales) Kingsley Jones

Touch judges:
Federico Anselmi (Argentina)
Pablo de Luca (Argentina)
Television match official:
Santiago Borsani (Argentina)

== See also ==
- 2019 Rugby World Cup qualifying
- History of rugby union matches between Canada and the United States
