= Andrew Turner (rugby union, born 1993) =

US international rugby union player

- Born: 24 March 1993 (age 33) London, England
- Height: 6 ft 1 in (1.85 m)
- Weight: 198 lb (90 kg)

Rugby union career
- Position(s): Lock; Wing; Scrum-half
Senior career
Years	Team	Apps	(Points)
2012–2014	Gordon RFC	11	(0)
2015–2016	London Scottish F.C.	5	(5)
- Correct as of April 24, 2019
International career
Years	Team	Apps	(Points)
2017	United States	1	(0)
- Correct as of April 24, 2019

Andrew Turner (born March 24, 1993) is a London, England-born rugby union player who has played for the United States men's national team. Turner has also previously played for Gordon RFC and London Scottish FC.

== Club career ==
=== Gordon ===
Turner made his debut for Gordon RFC on April 6, 2013, starting at lock, in a 28–11 defeat to Manly. Over the course of the 2013 and 2014 Shute Shield seasons, Turner made eleven total appearances for the club, starting in five matches; he did not score during his tenure with the club.

=== London Scottish ===
Turner made his debut for London Scottish FC on September 4, 2015, starting at wing, in a 23–19 defeat to Moseley in the RFU Championship. During the 2015–16 British and Irish Cup, Turner made three total appearances for the club; he scored one try during the competition. During the 2015–16 RFU Championship season, Turner made two total appearances for the club; he did not score in either match. After the 2015–16 season, Turner did not rejoin the club.

== International career ==
=== USA Eagles ===
Turner was first named to the roster for the USA Eagles ahead of the 2017 Americas Rugby Championship. Turner made his debut for the Eagles on February 25, 2017, appearing as a substitute and playing at scrum-half, in a 57–9 victory against Chile. As of April 2019, this is the only appearance that he has made for the Eagles.
