= 2017 South American Rugby Championship "A" =

- Date: May 13 – May 27, 2017
- Countries: Brazil; Chile; Paraguay; Uruguay

The 2017 South American Rugby Championship (Confederación Sudamericana de Rugby (CONSUR) Championship) Division A was the third edition of second level of the South American Rugby Championship. The tournament was played in a round-robin format, with each team playing each other once. The two first teams would win the right to compete in the top level tournament of South American Rugby Championship, called South America Rugby Cup, and the winner would face the loser of the two-game-series between USA and Canada as round 4 of the Americas qualification for the 2019 Rugby World Cup in Japan.

== Standings ==
Pos	Team	Pld	W	D	L	PF	PA	PD	Pts	Qualification
1	Uruguay (21)	3	3	0	0	113	57	+56	9	Advanced to Americas RWC Qualifying Round 4
2	Chile (29)	3	2	0	1	92	44	+48	6	
3	Brazil (31)	3	1	0	2	94	62	+32	3	
4	Paraguay (38)	3	0	0	3	32	168	−136	0	Played promotion/relegation play-off against winner of Championship B

Pre-tournament rankings are in parentheses.

== Matches ==
=== Week 1 ===
13 May 2017

Chile	15–10	Brazil

13 May 2017

Paraguay	19–45	Uruguay

=== Week 2 ===
20 May 2017

Chile	66–7	Paraguay

20 May 2017

Uruguay	41–27	Brazil

=== Week 3 ===
27 May 2017

Uruguay	27–11	Chile

26 May 2017

Brazil	57–6	Paraguay

== See also ==
- 2019 Rugby World Cup – Americas qualification
