= Jeff Beukeboom =

Canadian ice hockey player and coach (born 1965)

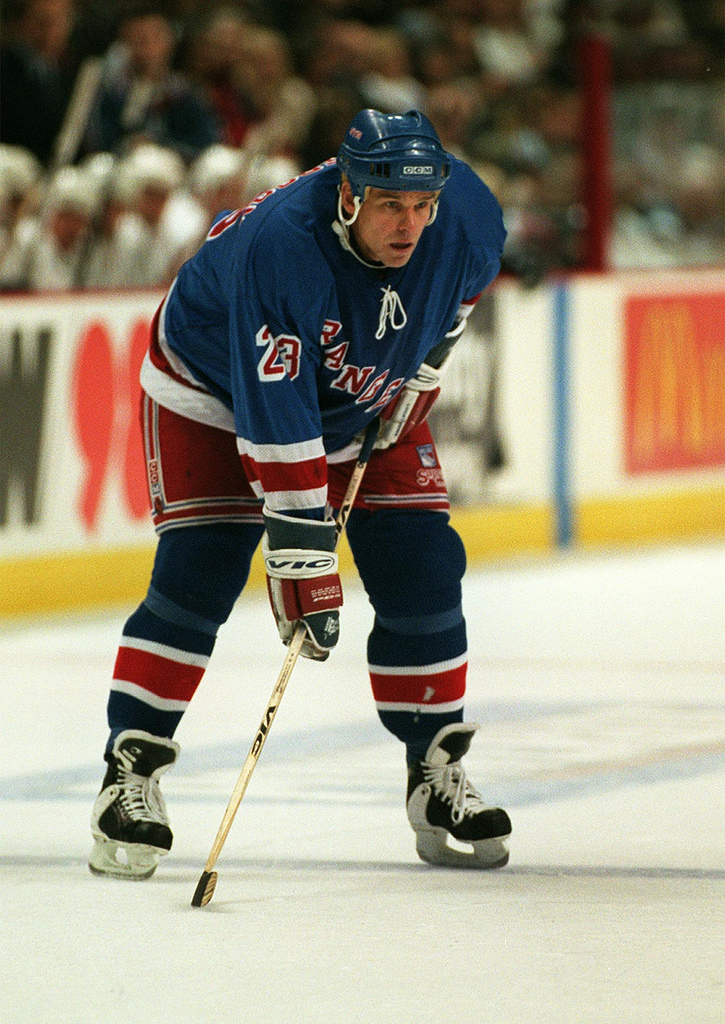
- Beukeboom with the New York Rangers in 1997
- Born: March 28, 1965 (age 61) Ajax, Ontario, Canada
- Height: 6 ft 5 in (196 cm)
- Weight: 230 lb (104 kg; 16 st 6 lb)
- Position: Defence
- Shot: Right
- Played for: Edmonton Oilers; New York Rangers
- NHL draft: 19th overall, 1983; Edmonton Oilers
- Playing career: 1985–1999

Jeffrey Scott Beukeboom (/buːkəbuːm/ BOO-kə-boom; born March 28, 1965) is a Canadian professional ice hockey coach and former player in the National Hockey League (NHL). He played as a defenceman for the Edmonton Oilers and New York Rangers between 1986 and 1999, winning 4 Stanley Cup Championships (1987, 1988, 1990, 1994).

== Playing career ==
Beukeboom played junior hockey for the Sault Ste. Marie Greyhounds (1982–1985). After being selected in the first round (19th overall) of the 1983 NHL entry draft by the Edmonton Oilers, he played in juniors for two more years before joining the Oilers. While playing for the Oilers, he won three Stanley Cups, and was known as a hard-hitting defenceman.

Beukeboom was traded from the Edmonton Oilers to the New York Rangers on November 12, 1991. At the time, neither the Rangers nor Oilers made any announcement to indicate that Beukeboom was part of the Mark Messier trade. He played on the top defensive pairing with Brian Leetch, and was an alternate captain. Beukeboom's stay-at-home play allowed Leetch to lead the rush and kept opposing players out of the goal crease. He led the team in penalty minutes three times (1992–93, 1993–94, 1995–96) and won his last Stanley Cup with the Rangers in 1994. He was also known for his philanthropy, including Ice Hockey in Harlem. Beukeboom won the Rangers' Crumb Bum Award, given for service to local youngsters, in 1996.

While with the Rangers, Beukeboom also appeared in a memorable This is Sportscenter spot in which he assaults ESPN's Steve Levy after being told Levy had referred to Beukeboom as "Puke-a-boom."

Due to his physical play, Beukeboom suffered multiple concussions, the most devastating of which came as a result of a sucker punch by Matt Johnson of the Los Angeles Kings in November 1998. Johnson received a 12-game suspension for intent to injure. While Beukeboom returned after a few games off, he bumped his head again in a minor collision with Martin Gelinas in February 1999 and he was forced to miss the rest of the season. Afterward, Beukeboom was left with recurrent headaches, memory loss, nausea, and mental fogginess that lasted for months. He was diagnosed with post-concussion syndrome, and ordered to never play hockey again. Beukeboom officially retired in July 1999 with a total of 1,890 NHL penalty minutes in 804 games played, and is currently second all-time on the Rangers' penalty minutes list. After retiring, he continued to suffer post-concussion symptoms for almost two years before recovering.

== Post-NHL career ==
Beukeboom returned to hockey as an assistant coach for the Toronto Roadrunners American Hockey League (AHL) for the 2003–04 season. In 2005, he became the president and part owner of the Lindsay Muskies of the Ontario Provincial Junior "A" Hockey League, and in 2008, Beukeboom became an assistant coach for the Barrie Colts of the Ontario Hockey League (OHL) and worked in both teams. In June 2009, Beukeboom was named the assistant coach of the Sudbury Wolves of the Ontario Hockey League. That same year, he served as a coach for Team Canada Red at the World Jewish Hockey Tournament.

In 2012, he returned to the AHL as an assistant coach for the Connecticut Whale who would later be renamed to Hartford Wolf Pack. On July 1, 2016, he was hired as an assistant coach for the New York Rangers.

== Personal life ==
Beukeboom was born in Ajax, Ontario, but grew up in Lindsay, Ontario.

His son, Brock, played for the UPEI Panthers. Brock was drafted by the Tampa Bay Lightning in the third round (63rd pick) of the 2010 NHL entry draft. He was traded to the Blues in February 2011, along with a third round draft pick in the 2011 NHL entry draft, in exchange for Eric Brewer. However, the Blues did not sign him and he decided to attend the New York Rangers' prospect camp in 2013. In 2018, he signed overseas with Fehérvári Titánok in the Erste Liga.

His daughter, Tyson, played college rugby for St. Francis Xavier University. In 2012, she was named the CIS Female Athlete of the Year. In 2014, she was named to Canadian national team.

Beukeboom is the brother of former Ontario Hockey League players John and Brian Beukeboom, the cousin of fellow former NHL player Joe Nieuwendyk, the nephew of the late Ed Kea, and the second cousin of Adam Beukeboom. He is the uncle of Brett Beukeboom and Matt Beukeboom and Johnny and Scott McGuire. Johnny played in the Ontario Hockey League (OHL), American Hockey League (AHL), and ECHL, while Scott spent two seasons in the Central Ontario Junior C Hockey League.

== Career statistics ==
=== Regular season and playoffs ===
			Regular season					Playoffs
Season	Team	League	GP	G	A	Pts	PIM	GP	G	A	Pts	PIM
1981–82	Newmarket Flyers	OJHL	49	5	30	35	218	—	—	—	—	—
1982–83	Sault Ste. Marie Greyhounds	OHL	70	0	25	25	143	16	1	4	5	46
1983–84	Sault Ste. Marie Greyhounds	OHL	61	6	30	36	178	16	1	7	8	43
1984–85	Sault Ste. Marie Greyhounds	OHL	37	4	20	24	85	16	4	6	10	47
1985–86	Nova Scotia Oilers	AHL	77	9	20	29	175	—	—	—	—	—
1985–86	Edmonton Oilers	NHL	—	—	—	—	—	1	0	0	0	4
1986–87	Edmonton Oilers	NHL	44	3	8	11	124	—	—	—	—	—
1986–87	Nova Scotia Oilers	AHL	14	1	7	8	35	—	—	—	—	—
1987–88	Edmonton Oilers	NHL	73	5	20	25	201	7	0	0	0	16
1988–89	Edmonton Oilers	NHL	36	0	5	5	94	1	0	0	0	2
1988–89	Cape Breton Oilers	AHL	8	0	4	4	36	—	—	—	—	—
1989–90	Edmonton Oilers	NHL	46	1	12	13	86	2	0	0	0	0
1990–91	Edmonton Oilers	NHL	67	3	7	10	150	18	1	3	4	28
1991–92	Edmonton Oilers	NHL	18	0	5	5	78	—	—	—	—	—
1991–92	New York Rangers	NHL	56	1	10	11	122	13	2	3	5	47
1992–93	New York Rangers	NHL	82	2	17	19	153	—	—	—	—	—
1993–94	New York Rangers	NHL	68	8	8	16	170	22	0	6	6	50
1994–95	New York Rangers	NHL	44	1	3	4	70	9	0	0	0	10
1995–96	New York Rangers	NHL	82	3	11	14	220	11	0	3	3	6
1996–97	New York Rangers	NHL	80	3	9	12	167	15	0	1	1	34
1997–98	New York Rangers	NHL	63	0	5	5	195	—	—	—	—	—
1998–99	New York Rangers	NHL	45	0	9	9	60	—	—	—	—	—
NHL totals			804	30	129	159	1890	99	3	16	19	197

== Awards and honours ==
- Four-time Stanley Cup champion (1987, 1988, 1990, 1994).
- NY Rangers Crumb Bum Award - service to local youngsters (1996).
- OHL All-Star First Team (1984–85)
- In the 2009 book 100 Ranger Greats, was ranked No. 50 all-time of the 901 New York Rangers who had played during the team's first 82 seasons

Preceded by Jim Playfair	Edmonton Oilers first-round draft pick 1983	Succeeded by Selmar Odelein
