= Mark Anscombe =

NZ rugby union player & coach

- Born: 1957 (age 68–69) Taranaki, New Zealand
- School: Sacred Heart College, Auckland
- Occupation: Rugby Union Coach

Rugby union career
- Position: Flanker
Amateur team(s)
Years	Team	Apps	(Points)
1976–1991	East Coast Bays		
1977	Auckland		
Provincial / State sides
Years	Team	Apps	(Points)
1985–1989	North Harbour	54	(32)
Coaching career
- Years: Team
- 1994–1996: Old Wesley
- 1996–1997: Moseley (Director of rugby)
- 1999–2000: Auckland Colts
- 2001–2003: Auckland development
- 2002–2003: Blues development
- 2004–2005: North Harbour (Asst. Coach)
- 2006–2008: North Harbour (Head Coach)
- 2008–2010: New Zealand U20 (Asst. Coach)
- 2008–2011: Auckland
- 2011: New Zealand U20 (Head Coach)
- 2012–2014: Ulster
- 2016–2017: Canada

Mark Anscombe (born 1957) is a New Zealand rugby union coach, having played rugby spanning across 15 years. Anscombe (father of Welsh international Gareth Anscombe) has been a rugby union coach since 1994, coaching various ages and styles in both hemispheres. He is a former head coach of the Canadian national team.

Anscombe played over 200 club games for East Coast Bays from 1976 to 1991. Anscombe captained East Coast Bays to back to back Harbour Club championships in 1985 and 1986 over North Shore and Takapuna respectively. After retiring from rugby in 1990 Anscombe then coached the Bays premier side from 1990 to 1994 including the 1991 Harbour Club rugby championship win over Takapuna in 1991. Bays were Championship runners up in 1993 and 1994. Anscombe is one of five East Coast Bays Rugby 200 game double centurions alongside Ian Coley, Slade McFarland, Wayne Hill and Rhys Bennett.

== Playing career ==
Originally from Taranaki, New Zealand, Anscombe moved to Auckland at a young age and played as a flanker in Auckland for East Coast Bays. He played for an Auckland representative team in 1977, before playing provincial rugby for the newly founded team North Harbour between 1985 and 1989. He captained the side on many occasions, guiding them to the National Provincial Championship Second division title in 1987.

== Coaching career ==
=== Europe ===
After playing in New Zealand for 15 years, Anscombe turned his attention to coaching, where he began in 1994 in Dublin. He was the head coach for Old Wesley in the All-Ireland League where in his first season in charge, the side finished sixth, while in eighth in his second. In 1996, he gained a professional contract with English side Moseley as a director of rugby, where he signed six internationals to the club.

However, his stay at the club was short lived, as Anscombe left the club in February 1997, being replaced with Allan Lewis

=== New Zealand ===
After a short break in New Zealand, Anscombe became a highly recognised coach in Auckland, after coaching the Auckland Colts between 1999 and 2000, before becoming a development coach for the region in 2001. In 2002 and 2003, he joined the regions Super 12 side the Blues as a development coach, which saw Anscombe coach the up-and-coming talent in the franchise.

In 2004, he became an assistant coach for Allan Pollock at North Harbour. He helped the team to the top four in just two seasons, having seen North Harbour finish sixth in 2004. However, in the 2005 National Provincial Championship, eventual champions Auckland defeated North Harbour 38–24 in the semi-finals. Ahead of the 2006 Air New Zealand Cup, Anscombe replaced Pollock as head coach at the province, and guided the team to second in Pool A, before being knocked out at the quarter-finals by Otago 56–21. In 2007, North Harbour fell back down the standings, finishing in ninth in the 2007 Air New Zealand Cup, then twelfth in 2008 Air New Zealand Cup.

In March 2008, Anscombe was appointed by the New Zealand Rugby Union as an assistant coach for the inaugural IRB Junior World Championship. Anscombe and head coach Dave Rennie made a formidable partnership at the "Baby Blacks", guiding the side to consecutive Champions between 2008 and 2010.

During that time, Anscombe coached Auckland in a period that was largely unsuccessful, though narrowly lost out on the final in 2010 after losing to Waikato 38–37. In 2011, Anscombe replaced Rennie as the head coach of the New Zealand under 20 team, guiding the Baby Blacks to a fourth consecutive title. At the end of 2011, after a poor season with Auckland, Anscombe left the province and headed overseas.

=== Europe ===
In 2012, he was named the new Ulster head coach, replacing Brian McLaughlin who failed to get his contract re-signed. His first competitive game as Ulster coach was on 31 August 2012, an 18–10 win against Glasgow Warriors in the 2012–13 Pro 12 at Ravenhill. Ulster finished top of the table with 17 wins, and after beating Welsh side Scarlets in the semi-finals 28–17, it was an-all Ireland final between Ulster and Leinster. Leinster were the eventual champions, defeating Anscombe's side 24–18.

In Europe, Ulster was seeded fifth after the pool phase of the 2012–13 Heineken Cup, however, they were defeated by Saracens in the quarters 27–16. In Anscombe's second season in charge, Ulster finished fourth at the end of the regular season, but was again beaten by Leinster in the semi-finals 13–9. However, Ulster won all six of their pool games in the 2013–14 Heineken Cup, which included over English and French giants Leicester Tigers and Montpellier. However, like in 2012, they faced Saracens in the quarter-finals and lost, this time 17–15. On 30 June 2014, Anscombe left his position as Ulster Rugby's head coach after two seasons in charge at Ravenhill.

=== Head coach of Canada ===
On 30 March 2016, Anscombe was named the new head coach of the Canadian national team, replacing interim head coach Francois Ratier. His first match in charge was a home game against Japan at BC Place, where despite being in the lead for most of the match, Japan were the victors, 26–22. A week later, Canada defeated Russia 46–21, and were narrowly beaten by Italy on 26 June, 20–18. During their 2016 November tour to Europe, Canada lost all three games on their campaign. They played Ireland for the first match, which saw the Irish claim a 52–21 win. The following week, Canada lost 21–16 to Romania before narrowly losing to Samoa 25–23 at a neutral venue in France.

In March 2017, Canada finished fifth in the 2017 Americas Rugby Championship, only gaining a single win; a 36–15 win over Chile. In the other four games, Canada lost 20–6 to Argentina XV, 51–34 to the United States before losing to Uruguay for the first ever time since 2002, 17–13, and a first ever loss to Brazil 24–23. With other international results over time, Canada dropped to their all-time low on the World Rugby Rankings, dropping to 23rd. During the June internationals, Anscombe led Canada to two back-to-back losses, 13–0 to Georgia and 25–9 to Romania. Both tests were historic ones, as it was the first time that Canada had lost to both teams at home. While the result against Georgia was the first time since 2008 that Canada had failed to score any points in a test match. Following Canada's June internationals, Anscombe led his side into the USA v Canada play-offs for the 2019 Rugby World Cup qualification. The first leg of the play-offs saw the game end in a 28–all draw in Hamilton, Ontario. However the second leg was convincingly won by the United States 52–16, to see the United States qualify as the leading Qualifying Americas nation for the first time ever, overtaking Canada who has held the position for the previous 2 World Cups.

Following the 2017 June tests and 2019 Rugby World Cup qualifiers against the United States, Rugby Canada conducted a full review of their June–July campaign. The review concluded with the sacking of Anscombe as Canadian rugby head coach on 4 August 2017. Anscombe left the national team with just 2 wins from 15 games, and conceded over 400 points in as many games, while seeing the side slip to their worst ever World Ranking of 23rd.

In 2022, Anscombe joined Wellington School, Somerset as Rugby Consultant.

== Honours ==
New Zealand Under-20 (as assistant coach)

- World Rugby Under 20 Championship
  - Winners: 2008, 2009, 2010

New Zealand Under-20 (as head coach)

- World Rugby Under 20 Championship
  - Winners: 2011

Ulster

- Pro12
  - Runners-up: 2013

Sporting positions
Preceded by (France) Francois Ratier (Interim)	Canada National Rugby Union Coach; 2016–2017	Succeeded by (Wales) Kingsley Jones
