= Reegan O'Gorman =

Canadian rugby union player

- Born: 7 May 1996 (age 30) Canada
- Height: 1.99 m (6 ft 6 1/2 in)
- Weight: 107 kg (16.8 st; 236 lb)

Rugby union career
- Position: Lock
Senior career
Years	Team	Apps	(Points)
2021	Austin Gilgronis	5	(0)
2022-	New England Free Jacks	0	(0)
- Correct as of 5 February 2022
International career
Years	Team	Apps	(Points)
2015	Canada U20	2	(0)
2017-	Canada	6	(0)
- Correct as of 5 February 2022

Reegan O'Gorman (born 7 May 1996) is a Canadian rugby union player, currently playing for the New England Free Jacks in Major League Rugby (MLR) and the Canadian national side. His preferred position is lock. He previously played for the Austin Gilgronis in MLR.

== Professional career ==
O'Gorman signed for Major League Rugby side Austin Gilgronis ahead of the 2021 Major League Rugby season. He had previously signed for the Toronto Arrows for the 2020 Major League Rugby season, however the move was cancelled due to the COVID-19 pandemic. He made his debut for Canada in the 2017 Americas Rugby Championship, appearing in five matches.

== Career statistics ==
As of 9 February 2022

Season	Team	Games	Starts	Sub	Tries	Cons	Pens	Drops	Points	Yel	Red
MLR 2021	Austin Gilgronis	5	0	5	0	0	0	0	0	0	0
MLR 2022	New England Free Jacks	1	1	0	0	0	0	0	0	0	0
Total		6	1	5	0	0	0	0	0	0	0
