= John Mitchell (rugby union) =

New Zealand rugby union coach and former player

John Mitchell OBE
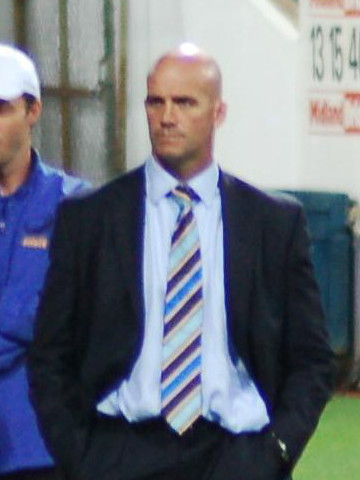
- Mitchell in 2006
- Full name: John Eric Paul Mitchell
- Born: 23 March 1964 (age 62) Hāwera, New Zealand
- Height: 1.90 m (6 ft 3 in)
- School: Francis Douglas Memorial College
- Notable relative(s): Daryl Mitchell (son); Paul Mitchell (brother)

Rugby union career
- Position(s): Flanker, Number 8, Lock
- Current team: England Women (head coach)
Senior career
Years	Team	Apps	(Points)
1983–1984	King Country		
1985–1995	Waikato	136	(287)
1990–1991	Garryowen		
- Correct as of 15 May 2023
International career
Years	Team	Apps	(Points)
1994	New Zealand XV	1	(0)
1996	Barbarian F.C.	1	(5)
Coaching career
- Years: Team
- 1996: Ireland (forwards)
- 1996–1999: Sale Sharks
- 1997–2000: England (forwards)
- 1999–2000: London Wasps (assistant)
- 2000–2001: Chiefs
- 2001–2003: New Zealand
- 2004–2005: Waikato
- 2006–2010: Western Force
- 2010–2012: Golden Lions
- 2011–2012: Lions
- 2012: Sale Sharks (director)
- 2013–2014: KwaZulu-Natal University
- 2016–2017: United States
- 2017–2018: Bulls
- 2017–2018: Blue Bulls
- 2018–2021: England (defence)
- 2022–2023: Japan (defence)
- 2023–: England Women
- Correct as of 15 May 2023

John Eric Paul Mitchell OBE (born 23 March 1964) is a New Zealand professional rugby union coach and former player who has been coaching the England Women's national team since 2023. His son is New Zealand international cricketer Daryl Mitchell.

== Playing career ==
=== Early career ===
Born 23 March 1964 in Hāwera, New Zealand, Mitchell was a pupil at Francis Douglas Memorial College in New Plymouth when he made the first XV; he was a member of the NZ secondary schools basketball team from 1981 to 1983. He represented NZ Juniors in basketball in 1982–83, but then decided to concentrate on rugby. From here, he earned a place at King Country RFU aged 19 before playing for Fraser-Tech from 1984. He was soon selected provincially for the Waikato Colts.

=== Provincial ===
He made his Waikato senior debut in 1985 and played at number eight, blindside flanker and lock before he became firmly established at number eight. Equal top scorer in first division rugby in 1989–90, he thus scored more tries over these seasons than any other NZ first division player.

Mitchell was given the Waikato captaincy in 1989. In 1990, because of a broken leg, he could only play half the games. He was reappointed captain in 1991 and led from that time on until his retirement just prior to the start of the 1995 season. Overall, he played 134 games for Waikato, including a record 86 times as captain, scoring 335 points from 67 tries. In the off-season, Mitchell played club rugby in France and Ireland, which included a stint with Garryowen in the All-Ireland League. He was part of the team that finished second in the 1990–91 season to Cork Constitution.

=== All Blacks ===
Though Mitchell never played for the All Blacks at test level, he did represent the team on 6 occasions in 1993. He travelled as part of the 1993 tour of Britain squad, where he featured in six uncapped matches. His first was against a Midland Division side on 26 October 1993 where the All Blacks came out victors 12–6. He later captained the side three times, all resulting in victories – against a Scottish Development XV 31–12, England Emerging Players 30–19 and Combined Services 13–3.

=== Honours ===
Waikato

- National Provincial Championship
  - Winners: 1986 (Second division), 1992 (First division)

== Coaching ==
Despite not retiring from playing until 1995, Mitchell featured as a player/coach at Fraser Tech until his retirement. When Murray Kidd was named the new Ireland coach in 1995, he hired Mitchell as a technical adviser/forwards coach in January 1996.

In May 1996, he was brought into Sale Sharks by coach Paul Turner who later stood down at the end of the 1995–96 season. Mitchell subsequently became in charge of Sale until 1999. Following problems at Sale, his contract was bought out and he left the club.

In 1997, Mitchell was targeted by newly appointed head coach of England, Clive Woodward, to be the new forwards coach. He left the national set-up in 2000.

=== New Zealand ===
In late 2000 Mitchell returned to New Zealand for his appointment as the new head coach of the Chiefs in the Super 12, and he led the side to sixth in the table.

In October 2001, Mitchell was named the head coach of the New Zealand national side. Just a month after being appointed as head coach, Mitchell's first match in charge was against Ireland in Dublin, which saw the All Blacks win 40–29, before going onto beat Scotland 37–6, and Argentina 24–20. In 2002, Mitchell was unable to lead the All Blacks to reclaim the Bledisloe Cup, having not won the trophy since 1997. The All Blacks reclaimed the trophy a year later, however, winning both games.

Mitchell led the All Blacks to a third-place finish at the 2003 Rugby World Cup, with victories over Italy, Canada, Tonga and Wales in the group stage to finish top of Pool D. The All Blacks beat the Springboks 29–9 in the quarterfinals, but lost to hosts Australia in the semifinal 22–10. Following that loss, Mitchell lost his job as All Blacks coach. The NZRU cited Mitchell's difficult relationships with the media and with sponsors as the main reasons for searching for other head coaching candidates, rather than the performance of the team.

=== Waikato ===
After leaving the All Blacks, Mitchell took over Waikato ahead of the 2004 National Provincial Championship. In his first season in charge, Waikato bowed out at the Semi Finals after losing to Wellington 28–16, while in 2005, they failed to make the play-offs at all, finishing seventh after the regular season.

=== Western Force ===
In 2006, Mitchell became the first ever New Zealander to coach an Australia Super Rugby franchise when he took over the Western Force in their debut season of the expanded Super 14. In their first season they finished last with just a single victory, coming in Round 13 against the Cheetahs, winning 16–14. In their second season, they jumped up to seventh on the table picking up 6 victories before falling back down the table across the 2008, 2009 and 2010 seasons. Mitchell was released as coach in 2010.

=== South Africa ===
Mitchell took up a role in South Africa as Golden Lions head coach, before returning to the Super Rugby in 2011 with the Lions. On 29 October 2011 it was Kiwi against Kiwi in the 2011 Currie Cup final when Mitchell's Golden Lions hosted a star-studded The Sharks rugby team under fellow Kiwi John Plumtree in Johannesburg. The Sharks team included the full Springbok front row as well as seven more Springboks. The Golden Lions won the match 42–16 to win their first Currie Cup Championship in 12 years and also winning their first Currie Cup title on their home field in 61 years.

On 22 June 2012, he was suspended after complaints from Lions players regarding the manner in which they were treated by Mitchell. In November, he was found not guilty of all charges against him and reinstated as Lions head coach. However, on 23 November 2012, he quit as coach to take over as a technical adviser at the Lions. On 28 November 2012 after two seasons with the Lions, Mitchell then accepted a position at Sale Sharks in the UK towards the end of 2012. However, on 29 December 2012, Sale announced Mitchell had returned to South Africa citing "personal reasons".

Following the 2015 Rugby World Cup, Mitchell applied for the vacant head coach position of the England national team, but Eddie Jones got the role instead.

=== United States ===
USA Rugby announced Mitchell on 4 January 2016 as the new head coach of the USA Eagles, taking over from Mike Tolkin on a four-year contract.

Mitchell's first match in charge was an uncapped match against Argentina XV in the inaugural Americas Rugby Championship. The game was drawn 35–35 in a game that included 11 uncapped players in the USA's team. Those 11 uncapped players were later officially capped a week later when Mitchell led USA to a 30–22 victory over Canada, the Americans' fourth consecutive victory over the Canadians. On 20 February, USA went top of the table with a 64–0 victory over Chile, however the States failed to keep hold of that position a week later when they were surprisingly beaten by Brazil in Barueri 24–23, with a last minute penalty to the Brazilians. It was the first ever meeting between the two nations, with Brazil earning their first ever victory over a tier 2 nation. On 5 March, Uruguay earned their first victory over the Americans since 2002, when they defeated the Eagles 29–25 in Montevideo. USA finished the Championship in second place with 15 points, 7 points behind Champions Argentina XV.

In June 2016, the United States put up a convincing display against Italy, going down 24–20. A week later, the United States beat rivals Russia 25–0. During the 2016 November internationals, Mitchell handed 6 players their international debut, across two test matches. The United States lost both test matches, 23–10 to Romania and 20–17 to Tonga. They were also defeated by the Māori All Blacks 54–7 at Toyota Park.

In March 2017, Mitchell led the United States to their first ever Americas Rugby Championship title, with victories over Brazil (51–3), Canada (51–34), Chile (57–9) and Uruguay (29–23) heading into the final week. Both the United States and Argentina XV were level on points leading into the Championship decider in the final week, which saw them draw for the second consecutive year – a bonus-point try in overtime to level the score and see the United States finish with 22 points on the table to Argentina's 21.

Mitchell helped the United States qualify for the 2019 Rugby World Cup as Americas 1, the first time they had done so with previous attempts seeing the States qualify as Americas 2 or 3. This came after they drew the first leg, Canada at home, 28–28, before the return fixture the following week in San Diego, which saw the Eagles win 52–16.

In 2017 he led the Eagles to winning the Americas Rugby Championship, the US first major tournament victory since the 1924 Olympics.

=== Bulls / Blue Bulls ===
On 25 May 2017, it was announced that Mitchell would return to South Africa to become the Executive of Rugby at the Blue Bulls, and that he would replace Nollis Marais as the head coach of the Bulls Super Rugby franchise. In August 2017, he also replaced Marais as the head coach of the Blue Bulls Currie Cup side.

In what turned out to be his only season with the Blue Bulls and Bulls, he led the Currie Cup side to fourth on the table.

=== England ===
In September 2018, Mitchell left his post with the South African franchise, and became defensive coach for the England national team. He helped England mount a World Cup campaign that saw them reach the final in 2019. Mitchell was then credited with being a rare and versatile coach who could coach both attack and defense at an elite level.

=== Japan ===
In February 2022, Mitchell joined Japan as defence coach

=== England (Women) ===
Mitchell became the head coach of the England women's team after the 2023 Men's Rugby World Cup. He joined up with the team during the 2023 WXV tournament but did not officially take over as head coach until after the tournament.

== Honours ==
New Zealand

- Rugby World Cup / Webb Ellis Cup
  - Third: 2003 Rugby World Cup
- Tri Nations Series
  - Winners: 2002, 2003
- Bledisloe Cup
  - Winners: 2003
- Dave Gallaher Trophy
  - Winners: 2002, 2003

United States

- Americas Rugby Championship
  - Winners: 2017
  - Runners-up: 2016

England Women

- Women's Rugby World Cup
  - Winners: 2025
- World Rugby Coach of the Year
  - Winner: 2025
- Women's Six Nations
  - Winners: 2024, 2025, 2026

== Personal life ==
His son Daryl is playing international cricket for New Zealand.

He became a British Citizen in July 2026.

Sporting positions
Preceded by Wayne Smith	All Blacks coach 2002–2003	Succeeded by Graham Henry
