= Matt Jensen (rugby union) =

American rugby union player (b. 1992)

- Full name: Matthew Jensen
- Born: April 21, 1992 (age 34) Scranton, Pennsylvania
- Height: 6 ft 8 in (2.03 m)
- Weight: 249 lb (113 kg)
- School: Pocono Mountain East High School
- University: Brigham Young University

Rugby union career
- Position: Lock
Amateur team(s)
Years	Team	Apps	(Points)
- Brigham Young University
- Correct as of April 25, 2019
Senior career
Years	Team	Apps	(Points)
2018–	Utah Warriors	31	(10)
- Correct as of 25 February 2021
International career
Years	Team	Apps	(Points)
2016–	USA Selects	8	(0)
2016–	United States	7	(10)
- Correct as of 25 February 2021

Matthew Jensen (born April 21, 1992) is an American rugby union player who plays at lock for the Utah Warriors of Major League Rugby (MLR) and the United States men's national team.

== Club career ==
Jensen signed with Major League Rugby's Utah Warriors in for their inaugural 2018 season.

== International career ==
=== USA Eagles ===
Jensen was first named to the roster for the USA Eagles ahead of the 2016 end-of-year tests. Jensen made his debut for the Eagles on November 4, 2016, appearing as a substitute, in an uncapped match against the Māori All Blacks. Jensen earned his first cap for the Eagles on February 4, 2017, starting at lock, in the Eagles' 29–23 victory over Uruguay in the 2017 Americas Rugby Championship (ARC). Jensen scored his first try for the Eagles on February 25, 2017, appearing as a substitute, in a 57–9 victory against Chile in the ARC. As of April 2019, Jensen has made seven total appearances for the club and has scored two total tries.
