= George Barton (rugby union, born 1997) =

Canada international rugby union player

- Born: 27 September 1997 (age 29) Duncan, British Columbia
- Height: 1.85 m (6 ft 1 in)
- Weight: 108 kg (238 lb)
- School: Shawnigan Lake School

Rugby union career
- Position: Centre
- Current team: Rugby ATL
Youth career
- 2015-17: Clermont Auvergne
Senior career
Years	Team	Apps	(Points)
2018-21	Seattle Seawolves	29	(15)
2022-	Rugby ATL	0	(0)
- Correct as of 5 February 2022
Provincial / State sides
Years	Team	Apps	(Points)
2017	British Columbia Bears	1	(0)
International career
Years	Team	Apps	(Points)
2016-2017	Canada U20	7	(5)
2019-	Canada	2	(10)
- Correct as of 25 June 2019

George Barton (born 27 September 1997) is a Canadian rugby union player who plays centre for Rugby ATL in Major League Rugby (MLR) and for the Canadian national team.

Barton previously played for the Clermont Espoirs in France, following his performances for the Canada U20s where he was also captain.

== Club statistics ==
As of 1 March 2020

Season	Team	Games	Starts	Sub	Tries	Cons	Pens	Drops	Points	Yel	Red
MLR 2018	Seattle Seawolves	3	1	2	1	0	0	0	5	0	0
MLR 2019	Seattle Seawolves	16	11	5	1	0	0	0	5	0	0
MLR 2020	Seattle Seawolves	4	2	2	1	0	0	0	5	0	0
MLR 2021	Seattle Seawolves	6	4	2	0	0	0	0	0	0	0
MLR 2022	Rugby ATL	0	0	0	0	0	0	0	0	0	0
Total		29	18	11	3	0	0	0	15	0	0
