= Matt Beukeboom =

Canadian rugby union player (born 1997)

- Born: April 3, 1997 (age 29) Lindsay, Ontario, Canada
- Height: 1.98 m (6 ft 6 in)
- Weight: 106 kg (234 lb)
- University: Queen's University
- Notable relative(s): Brett Beukeboom (brother), Jeff Beukeboom (uncle), Tyson Beukeboom (cousin)

Rugby union career
- Position: Lock / Flanker
Youth career
- 2016–19: Section Paloise
Senior career
Years	Team	Apps	(Points)
2019–2021	US Montauban	19	(0)
2021–	Bourg-en-Bresse		
- Correct as of 5 June 2021
International career
Years	Team	Apps	(Points)
2017	Canada U20	4	(0)
2017–	Canada	3	(0)
- Correct as of 5 June 2021

Matt Beukeboom (born April 3, 1997) is a Canadian rugby union player. His usual positions are in the second or back row. He currently plays for US Montauban in the French second division.

== Career ==
Beukeboom spent the 2015–2016 season with Queen's University in Kingston, Canada.

In July 2016, he joined the Section Pau Espoirs.

=== Club ===
Matt Beukeboom signed up for two seasons with US Montauban in May 2019.

In June 2021, Beukeboom signed on to join Union Sportive Bressane for the upcoming Pro D2 season.

=== Club statistics ===
As of 5 June 2021

Competition	Season	Team	Games	Starts	Sub	Tries	Cons	Pens	Drops	Points	Yel	Red
ProD2	2019–20	US Montauban	10	8	2	0	0	0	0	0	1	0
ProD2	2020–21	US Montauban	9	3	6	0	0	0	0	0	1	0
Total			19	11	8	0	0	0	0	0	2	0
