= Liam Chisholm =

Canada international rugby union player

- Born: July 4, 1991 (age 35)
- Height: 6 ft 7 in (201 cm)
- Weight: 257 lb (117 kg)
- Occupation: University of Victoria

Rugby union career
- Position: Lock
International career
Years	Team	Apps	(Points)
2016–17	Canada	6	(0)

Liam Chisholm (born July 4, 1991) is a Canadian former international rugby union player.

Chisholm hails from Kenora, Ontario, and was an ice hockey player growing up, relocating to Saskatchewan in his teens to play the sport at Athol Murray College of Notre Dame. He picked up rugby during his school years in Saskatchewan and later competed on the University of Victoria varsity team.

A 6 ft 7 in lock, Chisholm debuted for Canada at the 2016 Americas Rugby Championship, gaining his first cap off the bench against the United States in Round Rock, Texas. He featured at the same tournament again in 2017 and made his sixth and final capped appearance in that year's home Test against Georgia in Calgary.

== See also ==
- List of Canada national rugby union players
