= Admir Cejvanovic =

Bosnian-born Canadian rugby union player

- Born: June 26, 1990 (age 36) Velika Kladuša, Bosnia and Herzegovina
- Height: 181 cm (5 ft 11 in)
- Weight: 109 kg (240 lb)

Rugby union career
- Position: No. 8
International career
Years	Team	Apps	(Points)
2016–18	Canada	12	(10)
Medal record
Men's rugby sevens
Representing Canada
Pan American Games
Gold medal – first place	2015 Toronto	Team competition
Silver medal – second place	2019 Lima	Team competition

Admir Cejvanovic (born June 26, 1990) is a Bosnian-born Canadian international rugby union player.

== Biography ==
Born in Velika Kladuša, Cejvanovic was displaced during the Bosnian War and spent time in a United Nations refugee camp on the border with Croatia, then over the border in the town of Pula, before moving to Canada with his mother Rahmana at the age of four, having been sponsored by a church. They settled in Burnaby, British Columbia.

Cejvanovic began playing rugby aged 13 at his hometown club Burnaby and got his first international call up in 2014 during the 2014–15 Sevens World Series. He was a gold medalist for Canada in rugby sevens at the 2015 Pan American Games in Toronto, made possible by his match-winning try in the semi-final against the United States. From 2016 to 2018, Cejvanovic was a member of the Canada XVs, playing mostly as a number eight.

== See also ==
- List of Canada national rugby union players
