= Brett Beukeboom =

Canada international rugby union player

- Born: August 13, 1990 (age 36) Lindsay, Ontario, Canada
- Height: 1.96 m (6 ft 5 in)
- Weight: 113 kg (249 lb)
- Notable relative(s): Matt Beukeboom (brother), Jeff Beukeboom (uncle), Tyson Beukeboom (cousin)

Rugby union career
- Position: Lock
Senior career
| Years | Team | Apps | (Points) |
| 2012-2016 | Plymouth Albion | | |
| 2016—2020 | Cornish Pirates | | |
International career
| Years | Team | Apps | (Points) |
| 2012–2020 | Canada | 32 | (10) |

Brett Gary Beukeboom (born 13 August 1990) is a former rugby union lock who played for Canada. Beukeboom made his debut for Canada in 2012 and was part of the Canada squad at the 2015 Rugby World Cup.
