= Matías Benítez (rugby union) =

Uruguayan rugby union player

- Born: Edgardo Matías Benítez Santin; 16 May 1988 (age 38) Uruguay
- Height: 1.81 m (5 ft 11 1/2 in)
- Weight: 115 kg (18.1 st; 254 lb)

Rugby union career
- Position: Prop
Senior career
Years	Team	Apps	(Points)
2021–	Peñarol	0	(0)
- Correct as of 2 February 2021
International career
Years	Team	Apps	(Points)
2008	Uruguay U20s	4	(5)
2010–	Uruguay	45	(5)
2017–	Uruguay A	4	(0)
2020–	Uruguay XV	2	(0)
- Correct as of 9 September 2023

Matías Benítez (born 16 May 1988) is a Uruguayan rugby union player, currently playing for Súper Liga Americana de Rugby side Peñarol. His preferred position is prop.

== Professional career ==
Benítez signed for Súper Liga Americana de Rugby side Peñarol ahead of the 2021 Súper Liga Americana de Rugby season. He has also represented the Uruguay national team.
