= Ben Tarr =

American rugby union player

- Born: 17 March 1994 (age 32) Indianapolis, Indiana, U.S.
- Height: 1.8 m (5 ft 11 in)
- Weight: 112 kg (247 lb)
- School: Southport School

Rugby union career
- Position: Prop
Amateur team(s)
Years	Team	Apps	(Points)
2014	Souths		
- Correct as of 17 April 2016
Senior career
Years	Team	Apps	(Points)
2016	Denver Stampede	9	(0)
2018–	New Orleans Gold	21	(5)
- Correct as of 28 December 2020
International career
Years	Team	Apps	(Points)
2014	United States U20	3	(0)
2014–2017	United States	11	(0)
- Correct as of 28 December 2020

Benjamin Tarr (born 17 March 1994), is an American rugby union player who plays for the New Orleans Gold in Major League Rugby (MLR). His usual position is tighthead prop. He also played for the United States national team.

== Early life ==
Tarr grew up in Indianapolis, Indiana, before studying and playing rugby at the Southport School in Queensland, Australia.

== Career ==
Tarr represented the United States under-20 team at the 2014 Junior World Rugby Trophy where he played in the front row alongside fellow future USA Eagle Titi Lamositele. He then joined the USA Selects for the 2014 Americas Rugby Championship.

Tarr was selected for the USA Eagles 2014 Autumn tour to Europe. He made his test match debut on November 8 against Romania when he replaced Olive Kilifi at tight-head prop. A week later he won his second cap, again as a replacement, this time replacing Mate Moeakiola.

In February 2016, Tarr signed up to the new PRO Rugby North American competition with the Denver Stampede. In early 2018 he joined the New Orleans Gold of Major League Rugby. In 2019 he also provided commentary and was a ground announcer for regular season fixtures.
