= Juan Manuel Cat =

Uruguayan rugby union player

- Full name: Juan Manuel Cat Piccardo
- Born: 6 September 1996 (age 30) Montevideo, Uruguay
- Height: 175 cm (5 ft 9 in)
- Weight: 83 kg (183 lb)
- School: The British Schools of Montevideo

Rugby union career
- Position(s): Fly-half, Outside Centre
- Current team: Peñarol
Senior career
| Years | Team | Apps | (Points) |
| 2020− | CUBA | | |
- Correct as of 24 September 2019
International career
| Years | Team | Apps | (Points) |
| 2016–present | Uruguay | 34 | (63) |
- Correct as of 3 October 2019

Juan Manuel Cat Piccardo (born 6 September 1996) is a Uruguayan rugby union player who generally plays as a fly-half represents Uruguay internationally. Actually Juan Manuel is playing at CUBA(Club Universitario de Buenos Aires).He was included in the Uruguayan squad for the 2019 Rugby World Cup which was held in Japan for the first time and also marked his first World Cup appearance.

== Career ==
He made his international debut for Uruguay against Germany on 12 November 2016.
