= Ignacio Dotti =

Uruguayan rugby union player

- Born: Ignacio Francisco Dotti Uria; 18 August 1994 (age 32) Montevideo, Uruguay
- Height: 6 ft 3 in (1.91 m)
- Weight: 244 lb (17 st 6 lb; 111 kg)

Rugby union career
- Position: Lock
- Current team: New Orleans Gold
Amateur team(s)
Years	Team	Apps	(Points)
2013−2018	Los Cuervos		
Senior career
Years	Team	Apps	(Points)
2019–	New Orleans Gold	16	(15)
- Correct as of 18 August 2019
International career
Years	Team	Apps	(Points)
2014	Uruguay Under 20	4	(10)
2015–	Uruguay	59	(20)
- Correct as of 9 September 2023

Ignacio Francisco Dotti Uria (born 18 August 1994) is a Uruguayan rugby player for New Orleans Gold in Major League Rugby (MLR), the highest level of American rugby. His primary position is lock.

He made his international debut for Uruguay in 2015 and was named in the 2019 Rugby World Cup squad.

== Personal ==
Dotti attended Ivy Thomas Memorial School and then Universidad ORT.

== Career ==
Dotti made his international debut for Uruguay on 11 April 2015, in a South American Championship game against Paraguay.

In October 2018, Dotti signed for New Orleans Gold to play in the second season of Major League Rugby. He played 13 times for the Gold in the season. On 25 August 2019 it was announced he had signed a 1-year extension for he Gold.

He was selected for Uruguay's 31 man squad for the 2019 Rugby World Cup on 30 August 2019.
