= Matt Tierney (rugby union) =

Canada international rugby union player

- Born: Matthew Martin Joseph Tierney; 4 July 1996 (age 30) Mississauga, Ontario
- Height: 6 ft 1 in (1.85 m)
- Weight: 134 kg (21 st 1 lb)

Rugby union career
- Position: Tighthead Prop
Amateur team(s)
Years	Team	Apps	(Points)
2014-2015	Ontario Blues		
2015-2016	Pau Academy		
Senior career
Years	Team	Apps	(Points)
2016-19	Pau	28	(0)
2019-	Castres Olympique	41	(5)
- Correct as of 6 December 2019
International career
Years	Team	Apps	(Points)
2015-16	Canada U20	5	(0)
2016–	Canada	20	(0)
- Correct as of 9 September 2019

Matthew Martin Joseph Tierney (born 4 July 1996) is a Canadian rugby union player. He currently plays for Castres Olympique in the Top14.
