= Kurt Weaver =

Rugby player and official

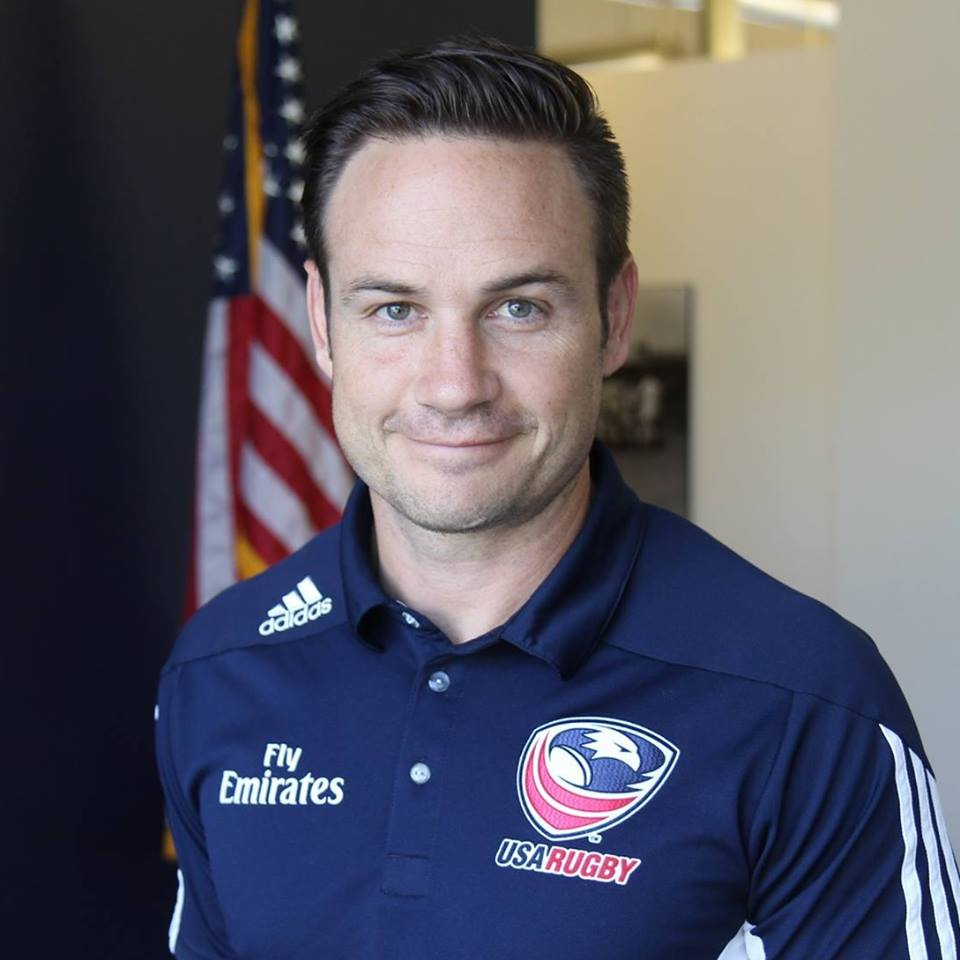
- Born: John Kurtis Weaver; March 8, 1979 (age 47) Pittsburgh, Pennsylvania, U.S.

Rugby union career
- Position: Fly half
Amateur team(s)
Years	Team	Apps	(Points)
1996-1997	Saint Charles		
1997-2001	Bowling Green		
2001-2005, 2007-2011	Scioto Valley RFC		
2005-2007	Cleveland Rovers		
2011-	Boulder Rugby Club		
Refereeing career
Years	Competition		Apps
2012-	Test matches		
2014, 2016	USARWPL Final		
2016	U20 Trophy Qualifiers		
2016-18	ARC		
2016	PRO Rugby		
2017	Women's test matches		
2017	Nations Cup		

John Kurtis Weaver (born March 8, 1979) is a Rugby union match official for World Rugby and USA Rugby competitions. He has refereed men's and women's international matches for World Rugby and professional and top-level club matches and National Championships for USA Rugby.

== Early life ==
Weaver, was born in Pennsylvania, Pennsylvania, and grew up in Pickerington, Ohio. He started swimming and playing association football, as well as golf, wrestling, and basketball. In school he found a love for music and participated in Marching band and chorus. He began his rugby career in high school at age 17, playing for Saint Charles Preparatory School Cardinals. He attended and played rugby at Bowling Green State University, earning a double bachelor's degree in political science and philosophy. Between political campaigns, Weaver served as president of BGSU's rugby club for two years, and was part of the 2001 team that advanced to the USA Rugby National Championship Round of 16.

After college he played for Scioto Valley Rugby Club in Columbus, Ohio, while starting a career in political campaign management and fundraising. His campaign experience included several federal government congressional campaigns, state-wide campaigns throughout Ohio and Kentucky, and local state house and senate campaigns.

Moving to Cleveland, Ohio, Weaver joined Cleveland Rovers Rugby Club. After sustaining an Anterior cruciate ligament injury, he temporarily hung up his playing boots and began coaching and refereeing. He coached locally in Ohio and eventually served as an assistant coach with the United States national under-20 rugby union team. Weaver became a full-time referee following a brief playing return with Scioto Valley Rugby Club.

== Refereeing career ==
Receiving his first appointments as a member of Ohio Rugby Referees Society in 2009, Weaver was named to the USA Rugby National Panel in 2011, the Elite Panel in 2014, and the Pro Panel in 2016. His first international appointment came in a Test match (rugby union) between Jamaica national rugby union team and Bahamas national rugby union team in 2012.

Weaver became a World Rugby referee in 2015, receiving multiple appointments to the Africa Cup, Americas Rugby Championship, World Rugby Under 20 Trophy, and World Rugby Nations Cup 2017, in addition to Assistant Referee appointments. He was one of the first contracted referees for the inaugural PRO Rugby season – the first professional Rugby union competition in the United States. He refereed Canada against the Maori All Blacks in November 2017.

== Career ==
Weaver founded non-profit Rugby Ohio in 2007, an organisation focused on developing youth through rugby in The Buckeye State. Rugby Ohio helped support the growth of youth rugby to 50 boys high school teams, 16 girls high school teams, and 11 youth teams in setting a precedent and model structure for growing youth rugby in the United States.

In 2011 Weaver was hired as Youth & High School director at USA Rugby, developing 45 functioning State Rugby Organizations and launching the award-winning Rookie Rugby program, as well as Try on Rugby. He developed coaching and refereeing education for the youth levels, and helped systemize the competition structure around the country for high school rugby. Weaver is also a World Rugby educator, delivering certification courses for coaches and referees around the United States.

Weaver also helped his brother found a business in Ohio called The Candle Lab in 2007. The Candle Lab is a community retail chain that sells organic, soy candles in the greater Columbus area. His first career was directing political campaigns from 2005 to 2007 for the LNE Group and was a partner and associate at Sisk & Associates from 2000 to 2005.
