= Benoît Piffero =

Canada international rugby union player

- Born: May 21, 1987 (age 39)
- Height: 1.83 m (6 ft 0 in)
- Weight: 102 kg (225 lb)

Rugby union career
- Position: Hooker
Amateur team(s)
| Years | Team | Apps | (Points) |
- Atlantic Rock
Senior career
| Years | Team | Apps | (Points) |
| 2010−2012 | Valence Romans Drôme | 37 | (0) |
| 2012−2015 | Blagnac | 21 | (5) |
| 2015−2016 | Castanet Rugby | 9 | (5) |
| 2016− | Blagnac | | |
International career
| Years | Team | Apps | (Points) |
| 2013-Present | Canada | 24 | (0) |
- Correct as of 9 September 2019

Benoît Piffero (born 21 May 1987 in Montreal, Quebec) is a rugby union hooker who plays for Atlantic Rock and Canada. Piffero made his debut for Canada in 2013 and was part of the Canada squad at the 2015 Rugby World Cup.
