= 2016 Americas Rugby Championship =

- Date: 6 February 2016 – 6 March 2016
- Countries: Argentina XV; Brazil; Canada; Chile; United States; Uruguay

Final positions
- Champions: Argentina XV (1st title)

Tournament statistics
- Matches played: 15
- Tries scored: 109 (7.27 per match)
- Attendance: 63,221 (4,215 per match)
- Top scorer(s): (Chile) Matías Nordenflycht (53)
- Most tries: (Argentina) Juan Pablo Estellés (5) (Argentina) Joaquín Paz (5)

The 2016 Americas Rugby Championship was the first series of the Americas Rugby Championship (sometimes informally called the "Americas Six Nations", a reference to Europe's Six Nations Championship), a new annual western hemisphere rugby union championship. It was contested by Argentina XV (Argentina's secondary national team), Canada, United States, Uruguay, Brazil, and Chile. All matches will be full international test matches with caps awarded, including for Argentina XV players and their opponents, but Argentina XV matches will not count to World Rankings for either team.

== Participants ==
Nation	Stadium			Head coach	Captain(s)
Nation	Home stadium	Capacity	City	Head coach	Captain(s)
Argentina XV	Estadio Gigante de Arroyito	41,654	Rosario	(Argentina) Pablo Bouza (Note: Pablo Bouza will be acting head coach for the XV team in place of normal head coach Daniel Hourcade.)	Rodrigo Báez; Roberto Tejerizo; Santiago Iglesias Valdez
Argentina XV	Estadio Bicentenario	25,286	San Juan	(Argentina) Pablo Bouza	Rodrigo Báez; Roberto Tejerizo; Santiago Iglesias Valdez
Brazil	Arena Barueri	35,000	São Paulo	(Argentina) Rodolfo Ambrosio	Daniel Danielewicz; João Luiz da Ros; Nick Smith
Brazil	Estádio Martins Pereira	15,317	São José dos Campos	(Argentina) Rodolfo Ambrosio	Daniel Danielewicz; João Luiz da Ros; Nick Smith
Canada	Westhills Stadium	1,718	Langford	(France) Francois Ratier, Jamie Cudmore,Graham Moffat (interim)	Hubert Buydens; Ray Barkwill
Chile	Estadio Municipal de La Pintana	6,000	Santiago	(Chile) Elías Santillán (interim)	Benjamín Soto
Chile	Centro de Alto Rendimiento de Rugby	1,500	Santiago	(Chile) Elías Santillán (interim)	Benjamín Soto
United States	BBVA Compass Stadium	22,039	Houston	(New Zealand) John Mitchell	Todd Clever; Olive Kilifi; Blaine Scully
United States	Lockhart Stadium	20,450	Fort Lauderdale	(New Zealand) John Mitchell	Todd Clever; Olive Kilifi; Blaine Scully
United States	Dell Diamond	11,631	Round Rock	(New Zealand) John Mitchell	Todd Clever; Olive Kilifi; Blaine Scully
Uruguay	Estadio Domingo Burgueño	22,000	Maldonado	(Argentina) Esteban Meneses	Juan Manuel Gaminara; Alejandro Nieto
Uruguay	Estadio Charrúa	14,000	Montevideo	(Argentina) Esteban Meneses	Juan Manuel Gaminara; Alejandro Nieto

== Table ==
Pos	Nation (rank)	Games				Points			Tries	Bonus points		Table points
Pos	Nation (rank)	Played	Won	Drawn	Lost	For	Against	Diff	Tries	4 tries	7 Pts loss	Table points
1	Argentina XV (n/a)	5	4	1	0	207	99	+108	30	4	0	22
2	United States (16)	5	2	1	2	177	110	+67	24	3	2	15
3	Canada (19)	5	3	0	2	192	139	+53	25	3	0	15
4	Uruguay (20)	5	3	0	2	123	131	–8	14	1	1	14
5	Brazil (42)	5	1	0	4	107	175	–68	11	0	2	6
6	Chile (24)	5	1	0	4	73	225	–152	5	0	1	5
Points are awarded to the teams as follows: Win - 4 points Draw - 2 points 4 or more tries - 1 point Loss within 7 points - 1 point Loss greater than 7 points - 0 point Rank refers to World Rugby Rankings before the start of the tournament

== Fixtures ==
The tournament will be played in a round-robin format, with each team playing the five others once.

=== Week One ===
6 February 2016
18:00 CLT (UTC-03)

Chile	25–22	Brazil (1 BP)
Try: Zunino 23' c De La Fuente 39' c Larenas 54' m Con: Nordenflycht (2/3) 24', 40'; Pen: Nordenflycht (2/3) 4', 17'	Report	Try: D. Sancery 7' c F. Sancery 45' m Tranquez 68' c Con: Harvey (2/3) 8', 69'; Pen: Harvey (1/3) 58'

Centro de Alto Rendimiento de Rugby, Santiago
Attendance: 1,850
Referee: Joaquín Montes (Uruguay)

FB	15	Leonardo Montoya
RW	14	José Ignacio Larenas
OC	13	Matías Nordenflycht
IC	12	Francisco de La Fuente
LW	11	Italo Zunino	(substituted off) 71'
FH	10	Cristian Onetto
SH	9	Beltrán Vergara
N8	8	Benjamín Soto (c)
OF	7	Javier Richard
BF	6	Cristobál Niedmann	(substituted off) 55'
RL	5	Matías Cabrera
LL	4	Nikola Bursic	(substituted off) 65'
TP	3	Sergio de La Fuente	(substituted off) 51'
HK	2	Rodrigo Moya	(substituted off) 51'
LP	1	José Ramón Ayarza	(substituted off) 77'
Replacements:
HK	16	Tomás Dussaillant
PR	17	Claudio Zamorano	(substituted on) 77'
PR	18	Luis Sepúlveda	(substituted on) 51'
LK	19	Raimundo Piwonka	(substituted on) 65'
FL	20	Ignacio Silva	(substituted on) 55'
SH	21	Juan Pablo Perrotta
FB	22	Pablo Casas	(substituted on) 71'
WG	23	Matías Contreras
Coach:
(Chile) Elías Santillán

FB	15	Daniel Sancery
RW	14	Stefano Giantorno
OC	13	Felipe Sancery
IC	12	Moisés Duque	(substituted off) 56'
LW	11	Lucas Tranquez
FH	10	David Harvey
SH	9	Beukes Cremer	(substituted off) 44'
N8	8	Nick Smith	(substituted off) 41'
OF	7	João Luiz da Ros (c)
BF	6	Mark Jackson
RL	5	Luiz Gustavo Viera	(substituted off) 56'
LL	4	Lucas Piero
TP	3	Jardel Vettorato	(substituted off) 78'
HK	2	Daniel Danielewicz	(substituted off) 45'
LP	1	Wilton Rebolo
Replacements:
HK	16	Yan Rosetti	(substituted on) 45'
PR	17	Lucas Abud		(substituted on) 60'
PR	18	Vitor Ancina	(substituted on) 78'
LK	19	Felipe Tissot	(substituted on) 56'
FL	20	Artur Bergo	(substituted on) 41'	(substituted off) 60'
CE	21	Martin Schaefer	(substituted on) 56'
FH	22	Lucas Duque
FB	23	Laurent Bourda-Couhet	(substituted on) 44'
Coach:
(Argentina) Rodolfo Ambrosio

Man of the Match:
Beltrán Vergara (Chile)

Touch judges:
Francisco Saavedra (Chile)
Frank Méndez (Chile)

Notes:

- Daniel Sancery and Felipe Sancery made their international debuts for Brazil.
- Rodrigo Moya and Beltrán Vergara made their international debuts for Chile.

6 February 2016
16:00 PST (UTC-08)

(1 BP) Canada	33–17	Uruguay
Try: Mackenzie 7' m Blevins 19' c Moor (2) 27' c, 71' c Clark 64' c Con: McRorie (4/5) 20', 28', 35', 74'	Report	Try: Penalty try 33' c Nieto 68' m Leivas 76' m Con: Silva (1/3) 33'

Westhills Stadium, Langford
Attendance: 1,123
Referee: Juan Sylvestre (Argentina)

FB	15	Pat Parfrey
RW	14	Phil Mackenzie
OC	13	Mozac Samson
IC	12	Nick Blevins
LW	11	Dan Moor
FH	10	Gradyn Bowd
SH	9	Gordon McRorie
N8	8	Clay Panga	(yellow card) 75' to 80'
OF	7	Lucas Rumball		(substituted off) 62'
BF	6	Kyle Gilmour
RL	5	Callum Morrison
LL	4	Paul Ciulini
TP	3	Jake Ilnicki
HK	2	Ray Barkwill
LP	1	Hubert Buydens (c)		(substituted off) 75'
Replacements:
HK	16	Eric Howard
PR	17	Djustice Sears-Duru		(substituted on) 75'
PR	18	Rob Brouwer
LK	19	Kyle Baillie
FL	20	Alistair Clark|		(substituted on) 62'
N8	21	Michael Hamson
SH	22	Andrew Ferguson
WG	23	Duncan Maguire
Coach:
(France) Francois Ratier

FB	15	Santiago Martinez
RW	14	Leandro Leivas
OC	13	Andrés Vilaseca
IC	12	Alberto Román
LW	11	Gastón Mieres		(substituted off) 73'
FH	10	Rodrigo Silva
SH	9	Guillermo Lijtenstein		(substituted off) 73'
N8	8	Alejandro Nieto
OF	7	Matías Beer		(substituted off) 70'	(substituted on) 73'
BF	6	Juan Manuel Gaminara (c)
RL	5	Diego Magno		(substituted off) 73'
LL	4	Franco Lamanna		(substituted off) 77'
TP	3	Juan Echeverría
HK	2	Carlos Arboleya		(substituted off) 77'
LP	1	Mateo Sanguinetti	(yellow card) 62' to 72'
Replacements:
HK	16	Germán Kessler		(substituted on) 77'
PR	17	Facundo Gattas		(substituted on) 70'	(substituted off) 73'
PR	18	Rafael Mones
PR	19	Rodolfo de Mula
LK	20	Mathias Palomeque		(substituted on) 77'
LK	21	Gonzalo Soto		(substituted on) 73'
SH	22	Santiago Arata		(substituted on) 73'
CE	23	Pedro Deal		(substituted on) 73'
Coach:
(Argentina) Esteban Meneses

Man of the Match:
Dan Moor (Canada)

Touch judges:
David Smortchevsky (Canada)
Harry Mason (Canada)

Notes:

- Gradyn Bowd, Paul Ciulini, Alistair Clark, Dan Moor, Clay Panga, Lucas Rumball and Mozac Samson made their international debuts for Canada.
- Santiago Arata, Facundo Gattas and Gonzalo Soto made their international debuts for Uruguay.

6 February 2016
19:00 CST (UTC-06)

(1 BP) United States	35–35	Argentina XV (1 BP)
Try: Ngwenya 12'; Clever 50' m Dolan 66' c Fry 74' c Con: Bird (3/4) 13', 67', 75'; Pen: Bird (3/4) 3', 6', 32'	Report	Try: Carrió (2) 17', 78' c Báez 25' c Paz 35' c Bertranou 65' c Con: Miotti (3/3) 18', 28', 36'; Novillo (2/2) 65', 78'

BBVA Compass Stadium, Houston
Attendance: 10,241
Referee: Chris Assmus (Canada)

FB	15	Blaine Scully (c)
RW	14	Takudzwa Ngwenya
OC	13	Chad London
IC	12	LeMoto Filikitonga
LW	11	Kingsley McGowan	(substituted off) 60'
FH	10	James Bird
SH	9	Niku Kruger	(substituted off) 56'
N8	8	David Tameilau
OF	7	Todd Clever	67' to 69'
BF	6	Cam Dolan
RL	5	Greg Peterson
LL	4	Brodie Orth		(substituted off) 69'
TP	3	Chris Baumann	(substituted off) 60'
HK	2	Joe Taufete'e	(substituted off) 67'
LP	1	Eric Fry
Replacements:
HK	16	Mike Sosene-Feagai	(substituted on) 67'
PR	17	Olive Kilifi	(substituted on) 60'
HK	18	James Hilterbrand
LK	19	Ben Landry
FL	20	Alec Gletzer	(substituted on) 67'
FH	21	JP Eloff
SH	22	Mike Te'o	(substituted on) 56'
FB	23	Jake Anderson	(substituted on) 60'
Coach:
(New Zealand) John Mitchell

FB	15	Ramiro Moyano
RW	14	Matías Orlando
OC	13	Juan Cappiello	(yellow card) 73' to 80'
IC	12	Joaquín Paz		(substituted off) 66'
LW	11	Tomás Carrió
FH	10	Domingo Miotti		(substituted off) 51'
SH	9	Gonzalo Bertranou
N8	8	Santiago Montagner
OF	7	Lautaro Bavaro		(substituted off) 69'
BF	6	Rodrigo Báez (c)
RL	5	Ignacio Larrague
LL	4	Marcos Kremer		(substituted off) 51'
TP	3	Felipe Arregui		(substituted off) 49'
HK	2	Santiago Iglesias Valdez		(substituted off) 72'
LP	1	Roberto Tejerizo		(substituted off) 49'
Replacements:
HK	16	Gaspar Baldunciel		(substituted on) 72'
PR	17	Franco Brarda		(substituted on) 49'
PR	18	Cristian Bartoloni		(substituted on) 49'
LK	19	Pedro Ortega		(substituted on) 51'
FL	20	José Deheza		(substituted on) 69'
SH	21	Lautaro Bazán Vélez
FH	22	Juan Novillo		(substituted on) 51'
CE	23	Juan Pablo Estellés		(substituted on) 66'
Coach:
(Argentina) Pablo Bouza

Touch judges:
Kurt Weaver (United States)
Phil Akroyd (United States)

=== Week Two ===
12 February 2016
20:00 BRST (UTC-02)

(1 BP) Brazil	29–33	Uruguay (1 BP)
Try: Viera 10' c D. Sancery 57' c Con: Harvey (2/2) 11', 58'; Pen: Harvey (5/5) 2', 8', 19', 54', 69'	Report	Try: Penalty try 32' c Lamanna (2) 35' m, 74' m Arata 61' m Kessler 65' m Con: Silva (1/5) 33'; Pen: Silva (2/3) 5', 49'

Arena Barueri, São Paulo
Attendance: 3,500
Referee: Damian Schneider (Argentina)

FB	15	Daniel Sancery
RW	14	Guilherme Coghetto
OC	13	Felipe Sancery		(substituted off) 42'
IC	12	Moisés Duque
LW	11	Lucas Muller		(substituted off) 30'	(substituted on) 40'
FH	10	David Harvey
SH	9	Lucas Duque
N8	8	João Luiz da Ros (c)
OF	7	Cleber Dias		(substituted off) 61'
BF	6	Mark Jackson	(yellow card) 72' to 80'
RL	5	Luiz Gustavo Viera		(substituted off) 71'
LL	4	Lucas Piero
TP	3	Jardel Vettorato		(substituted off) 66'
HK	2	Yan Rosetti
LP	1	Wilton Rebolo	(yellow card) 30' to 40'
Replacements:
HK	16	Daniel Danielewicz		(substituted on) 71'
PR	17	Caique Silva		(substituted on) 30'	(substituted off) 40'
PR	18	Vitor Ancina		(substituted on) 66'
LK	19	Felipe Tissot		(substituted on) 61'
N8	20	Nick Smith
CE	21	Mateus Estrela		(substituted on) 42'
FB	22	Laurent Bourda-Couhet
WG	23	Yan Machado
Coach:
(Argentina) Rodolfo Ambrosio

FB	15	Santiago Martinez	(substituted off) 78'
RW	14	Leandro Leivas
OC	13	Pedro Deal
IC	12	Andrés Vilaseca
LW	11	Federico Favaro	(substituted off) 59'
FH	10	Rodrigo Silva
SH	9	Guillermo Lijtenstein	(substituted off) 59'
N8	8	Alejandro Nieto (c)
OF	7	Matías Beer	(substituted off) 76'
BF	6	Gonzalo Soto
RL	5	Diego Magno
LL	4	Franco Lamanna	(substituted off) 78'
TP	3	Juan Echeverría	(substituted off) 57'
HK	2	Carlos Arboleya	(substituted off) 59'
LP	1	Mateo Sanguinetti	(substituted off) 62'
Replacements:
HK	16	Germán Kessler	(substituted on) 59'
PR	17	Facundo Gattas	(substituted on) 62'
PR	18	Ignacio Secco	(substituted on) 57'
LK	19	Ignacio Dotti	(substituted on) 78'
FL	20	Lukas Lacoste	(substituted on) 76'
SH	21	Santiago Arata	(substituted on) 59'
FH	22	Martín Secco	(substituted on) 78'
CE	23	Alberto Román	(substituted on) 59'
Coach:
(Argentina) Esteban Meneses

Touch judges:
Henrique Platais (Brazil)
Xavier Vouga (Brazil)

Notes:

- Lukas Lacoste, Ignacio Secco and Martín Secco made their international debuts for Uruguay.

13 February 2016
18:00 ART (UTC-03)

(1 BP) Argentina XV	52–15	Chile
Try: Tuculet (2) 2' c, 24' m Paz (4) 16' c, 58' c, 71' c, 77' c Portillo 63' c Etchart 65' m Con: Mercerat (6/8) 3', 16', 59', 64', 72', 78'	Report	Pen: Nordenflycht (5/6) 10', 19', 40', 44', 68'

Estadio Bicentenario, San Juan
Attendance: 8,500
Referee: Kurt Weaver (United States)

FB	15	Pedro Mercerat
RW	14	Rodrigo Etchart
OC	13	Santiago Álvarez Fourcade
IC	12	Joaquín Paz
LW	11	Segundo Tuculet	(substituted off) 65'
FH	10	Bautista Ezcurra	(substituted off) 65'
SH	9	Lautaro Bazán Vélez	(substituted off) 69'
N8	8	Miguel Urtubey	(substituted off) 51'
OF	7	Lautaro Bavaro
BF	6	José Deheza
RL	5	Marcos Kremer
LL	4	Pedro Ortega	(substituted off) 53'
TP	3	Enrique Pieretto	(substituted off) 45'
HK	2	Axel Zapata	(substituted off) 67'
LP	1	Roberto Tejerizo (c)	(substituted off) 64'
Replacements:
HK	16	Ignacio Calles	(substituted on) 67'
PR	17	Franco Brarda	(substituted on) 64'
PR	18	Eduardo Bello	(substituted on) 45'
LK	19	Ignacio Calas	(substituted on) 53'
FL	20	Santiago Portillo	(substituted on) 51'
SH	21	Mauro Perotti	(substituted on) 69'
FH	22	Juan Novillo	(substituted on) 65'
CE	23	Juan Cappiello	(substituted on) 65'
Coach:
(Argentina) Pablo Bouza

FB	15	Leonardo Montoya
RW	14	José Ignacio Larenas	(substituted off) 67'
OC	13	Matías Nordenflycht
IC	12	Francisco de La Fuente
LW	11	Italo Zunino	(substituted off) 62'
FH	10	Cristian Onetto
SH	9	Beltrán Vergara	(substituted off) 73'
N8	8	Benjamín Soto (c)
OF	7	Javier Richard
BF	6	Cristobál Niedmann	(substituted off) 51'
RL	5	Raimundo Piwonka	(substituted off) 49'
LL	4	Nikola Bursic
TP	3	Luis Sepúlveda	(substituted off) 67'
HK	2	Rodrigo Moya	(substituted off) 69'
LP	1	Claudio Zamorano	(substituted off) 53'
Replacements:
HK	16	Tomás Dussaillant	(substituted on) 69'
PR	17	Nicolás Venegas	(substituted on) 53'
PR	18	José Tomás Munita	(substituted on) 67'
LK	19	Felipe Bassaletti	(substituted on) 49'
FL	20	Ignacio Silva	(substituted on) 51'
SH	21	Matthieu Manas	(substituted on) 73'
FB	22	Pablo Casas	(substituted on) 62'
WG	23	Matías Contreras	(substituted on) 67'
Coach:
(Chile) Elías Santillán

Touch judges:
Claudio Antonio (Argentina)
Jason Mola (Argentina)

13 February 2016
18:00 CST (UTC-06)

(1 BP) United States	30–22	Canada
Try: London 26' c Clever (3) 57' m, 61' m, 65' c Con: Bird (1/1) 27'; Kruger (1/2) 66'; Pen: Bird (1/1) 20'; Kruger (1/2) 76'	Report	Try: Maguire 69' c Con: Ferguson (1/1) 70'; Pen: McRorie (5/6) 9', 13', 22', 30', 45'

Dell Diamond, Round Rock
Attendance: 7,145
Referee: Juan Sylvestre (Argentina)

FB	15	Jake Anderson
RW	14	Luke Hume
OC	13	Chad London
IC	12	LeMoto Filikitonga	(substituted off) 34'
LW	11	Kingsley McGowan
FH	10	James Bird	(substituted off) 40'
SH	9	Mike Te'o	(substituted off) 56'
N8	8	David Tameilau
OF	7	Todd Clever (c)
BF	6	Nate Brakeley
RL	5	Ben Landry	(substituted off) 71'
LL	4	Brodie Orth
TP	3	Chris Baumann	(substituted off) 71'
HK	2	Mike Sosene-Feagai	(substituted off) 46'
LP	1	Eric Fry	(substituted off) 71'
Replacements:
PR	16	Joe Taufete'e	(substituted on) 46'
PR	17	Olive Kilifi	(substituted on) 71'
HK	18	James Hilterbrand	(substituted on) 71'
FL	19	Pat Blair
FL	20	Alec Gletzer	(substituted on) 71'
SH	21	Niku Kruger	(substituted on) 56'
FH	22	JP Eloff	(substituted on) 40'
CE	23	Mike Garrity	(substituted on) 34'
Coach:
(New Zealand) John Mitchell

FB	15	Pat Parfrey
RW	14	Phil Mackenzie
OC	13	Mozac Samson	(substituted off) 49'
IC	12	Nick Blevins
LW	11	Dan Moor
FH	10	Gradyn Bowd
SH	9	Gordon McRorie	(substituted off) 66'
N8	8	Clay Panga
OF	7	Alistair Clark
BF	6	Lucas Rumball	(substituted off) 66'
RL	5	Callum Morrison	(substituted off) 59'
LL	4	Paul Ciulini
TP	3	Jake Ilnicki
HK	2	Ray Barkwill
LP	1	Hubert Buydens (c)	(substituted off) 54'
Replacements:
HK	16	Eric Howard
PR	17	Djustice Sears-Duru	(substituted on) 54'
PR	18	Rob Brouwer
LK	19	Kyle Baillie	(substituted on) 66'
LK	20	Liam Chisholm	(substituted on) 59'
N8	21	Michael Hamson
SH	22	Andrew Ferguson	(substituted on) 66'
WG	23	Duncan Maguire	(substituted on) 49'
Coach:
(France) Francois Ratier

Touch judges:
Derek Summers (United States)
Scott Green (United States)

Notes:

- Nate Brakeley, James Hilterbrand, Mike Sosene-Feagai, Ben Landry, Brodie Orth, David Tameilau, Alec Gletzer, James Bird, JP Eloff, Mike Te'o, Lemoto Filikitonga, Mike Garrity, Kingsley McGowan and Jake Anderson all made their international debuts for the United States.
- Kyle Baillie, Liam Chisholm, Andrew Ferguson and Duncan Maguire made their international debuts for Canada.

=== Week Three ===
20 February 2016
18:00 EST (UTC-05)

(1 BP) United States	64–0	Chile
Try: Baumann 11' m Eloff 17' m Edwards 22' c Taufete'e 35' c Thomas 52' c Anderson 56' c Te'o (2) 64' m, 77' c London 66' c Hume 73' c Con: Eloff (7/10) 23', 36', 53', 56', 67', 74', 77'	Report

Lockhart Stadium, Fort Lauderdale
Attendance: 5,101
Referee: Damian Schneider (Argentina)

FB	15	Mike Te'o		(substituted off) 77'
RW	14	Luke Hume
OC	13	Lorenzo Thomas
IC	12	Chad London
LW	11	Nick Edwards		(substituted off) 37'
FH	10	JP Eloff
SH	9	Tom Bliss		(substituted off) 40'
N8	8	David Tameilau		(substituted off) 69'
OF	7	Todd Clever (c)
BF	6	Nate Brakeley
RL	5	Brodie Orth
LL	4	Ben Landry		(substituted off) 58'
TP	3	Chris Baumann		(substituted off) 27'
HK	2	Joe Taufete'e		(substituted off) 69'
LP	1	Eric Fry
Replacements:
HK	16	Mike Sosene-Feagai		(substituted on) 69'
PR	17	Olive Kilifi	(yellow card) 37' to 47'	(substituted on) 27'
PR	18	Demecus Beach			(substituted on) 45'	(substituted off) 47'
FL	19	Alec Gletzer		(substituted on) 58'
FL	20	Pat Blair		(substituted on) 69'
SH	21	Niku Kruger		(substituted on) 40'
WG	22	Ryan Matyas		(substituted on) 77'
FB	23	Jake Anderson		(substituted on) 37'	(substituted off) 45'	(substituted on) 47'
Coach:
(New Zealand) John Mitchell

FB	15	Pablo Casas
RW	14	Matías Contreras	(substituted off) 45'
OC	13	Matías Nordenflycht
IC	12	Francisco de La Fuente
LW	11	Humberto Chacaltana
FH	10	Cristian Onetto
SH	9	Beltrán Vergara
N8	8	Benjamín Soto (c)
OF	7	Javier Richard	(substituted off) 64'
BF	6	Ignacio Silva
RL	5	Raimundo Piwonka
LL	4	Felipe Bassaletti	(substituted off) 54'
TP	3	Luis Sepúlveda	(substituted off) 67'
HK	2	Tomás Dussaillant	(substituted off) 45'
LP	1	Claudio Zamorano	(substituted off) 68'
Replacements:
HK	16	Rodrigo Moya	(substituted on) 45'
PR	17	Ińaki Gurruchaga	(substituted on) 68'
PR	18	José Tomás Munita	(substituted on) 67'
FL	19	Cristobál Niedmann	(substituted on) 64'
N8	20	Nikola Bursic	(substituted on) 54'
SH	21	Matthieu Manas
CE	22	José Ignacio Larenas	(substituted on) 45'
WG	23	Leonardo Montoya
Coach:
(Chile) Elías Santillán

Touch judges:
Mike Kelly (United States)
Cisco Lopez (United States)

Notes:

- Demecus Beach, Pat Blair, Tom Bliss, Nick Edwards, Ryan Matyas and Lorenzo Thomas made their international debuts for the United States.
- Tomás Dussaillant, Humberto Chacaltana and Ińaki Gurruchaga made their international debuts for Chile.

20 February 2016
20:15 UYT (UTC-03)

(1 BP) Uruguay	21–24	Argentina XV
Try: Ormaechea 12' m Favaro 37' c Con: M. Secco (1/2) 38'; Pen: M. Secco (3/4) 9', 27', 46'	Report	Try: Bollini 6' c Cuaranta 42' c Cappiello 70' c Con: Novillo (2/2) 7', 43'; Mercerat (1/1) 72'; Pen: Mercerat (1/1) 77'

Estadio Domingo Burgueño, Maldonado
Attendance: 6,000
Referee: Kurt Weaver (United States)

FB	15	Santiago Martinez		(substituted off) 69'
RW	14	Federico Favaro		(substituted off) 57'
OC	13	Andrés Vilaseca
IC	12	Facundo Klappenbach
LW	11	Andrés Rocco
FH	10	Martín Secco
SH	9	Guillermo Lijtenstein		(substituted off) 58'
N8	8	Alejandro Nieto		(substituted off) 62'
OF	7	Juan Diego Ormaechea	(yellow card) 51' to 61'
BF	6	Juan Manuel Gaminara (c)		(substituted off) 72'
RL	5	Mathias Palomeque	(yellow card) 60' to 70'
LL	4	Diego Magno		(substituted off) 67'
TP	3	Juan Echeverría
HK	2	Germán Kessler		(substituted off) 69'
LP	1	Mateo Sanguinetti		(substituted off) 69'
Replacements:
PR	16	Facundo Gattas		(substituted on) 69'
PR	17	Rodolfo de Mula		(substituted on) 69'
PR	18	Ignacio Secco		(substituted on) 72'
LK	19	Ignacio Dotti		(substituted on) 67'
FL	20	Fernando Bascou		(substituted on) 62'
FH	21	Manuel Blengio		(substituted on) 69'
SH	22	Santiago Arata		(substituted on) 58'
CE	23	Pedro Deal		(substituted on) 57'
Coach:
(Argentina) Esteban Meneses

FB	15	Segundo Tuculet		(substituted off) 68'
RW	14	Franco Cuaranta
OC	13	Juan Cappiello
IC	12	Bautista Ezcurra
LW	11	Axel Müller
FH	10	Juan Novillo		(substituted off) 58'
SH	9	Marcos Bollini
N8	8	Santiago Portillo		(substituted off) 63'
OF	7	Lautaro Bavaro
BF	6	José Deheza		(substituted off) 54'	(substituted on) 61'	(substituted off) 68'
RL	5	Ignacio Larrague
LL	4	Pedro Ortega
TP	3	Cristian Bartoloni		(substituted off) 47'
HK	2	Santiago Iglesias Valdez
LP	1	Roberto Tejerizo (c)	(yellow card) 51' to 61'		(substituted off) 61'
Replacements:
HK	16	Axel Zapata
PR	17	Facundo Gigena		(substituted on) 54'
PR	18	Enrique Pieretto	(yellow card) 55' to 65'	(substituted on) 47'
FL	19	Gonzalo Paulín		(substituted on) 63'
N8	20	Miguel Urtubey				(substituted on) 68'
SH	21	Mauro Perotti
FH	22	Juan Cruz González		(substituted on) 58'
FB	23	Pedro Mercerat		(substituted on) 68'
Coach:
(Argentina) Pablo Bouza

Touch judges:
Claudio Cativelli (Uruguay)
Alejandro Longres (Uruguay)

20 February 2016
16:00 PST (UTC-08)

(1 BP) Canada	52–25	Brazil
Try: Rumball (2) 4' c, 40' c Panga (2) 12' c, 65' c Barkwill 30' c Ciulini 76' c Hamson 80' c Con: Ferguson (5/5) 4', 13', 31', 40', 66'; Staller (2/2) 77', 80'; Pen: Ferguson (1/2) 24'	Report	Try: Cremer 26' c D. Sancery 47' m Da Ros 71' c Con: M. Duque (2/3) 27', 72'; Pen: M. Duque (2/2) 9', 21'

Westhills Stadium, Langford
Attendance: 1,865
Referee: Joaquín Montes (Uruguay)

FB	15	Pat Parfrey		(substituted off) 69'
RW	14	Dan Moor	(substituted off) 40'
OC	13	Brock Staller	57' to 69'
IC	12	Nick Blevins
LW	11	Duncan Maguire
FH	10	Gradyn Bowd
SH	9	Andrew Ferguson	(substituted off) 73'
N8	8	Clay Panga	(substituted off) 67'
OF	7	Alistair Clark
BF	6	Lucas Rumball
RL	5	Liam Chisholm	(substituted off) 73'
LL	4	Paul Ciulini
TP	3	Jake Ilnicki	(substituted off) 73'
HK	2	Ray Barkwill (c)	(substituted off) 67'
LP	1	Djustice Sears-Duru	(substituted off) 73'
Replacements:
HK	16	Eric Howard	(substituted on) 67'
PR	17	Hubert Buydens	(substituted on) 73'
PR	18	Rob Brouwer	(substituted on) 73'
LK	19	Kyle Baillie	(substituted on) 73'
N8	20	Michael Hamson	(substituted on) 67'
SH	21	Jake Robinson	(substituted on) 73'
CE	22	Joe Dolesau	(substituted on) 40'
FB	23	Brett Johnson	(substituted on) 57'
Coach:
(France) Francois Ratier

FB	15	Daniel Sancery
RW	14	Stefano Giantorno
OC	13	Felipe Sancery
IC	12	Moisés Duque
LW	11	Lucas Muller	(substituted off) 39'
FH	10	Lucas Duque
SH	9	Beukes Cremer	(substituted off) 40'
N8	8	Nick Smith
OF	7	Cleber Dias
BF	6	Mark Jackson	(substituted off) 40'
RL	5	Luiz Gustavo Viera
LL	4	Lucas Piero	(substituted off) 63'
TP	3	Vitor Ancina	(substituted off) 38'
HK	2	Daniel Danielewicz (c)	(substituted off) 38'
LP	1	Jonatas Paulo	(substituted off) 38'
Replacements:
HK	16	Yan Rosetti	(substituted on) 38'
PR	17	Wilton Rebolo	(substituted on) 38'
PR	18	Lucas Abud	(substituted on) 38'
FL	19	Matheus Wolf	(substituted on) 63'
FL	20	João Luiz da Ros	(substituted on) 40'
CE	21	Mateus Estrela
FB	22	Laurent Bourda-Couhet	(substituted on) 40'
FB	23	Guilherme Coghetto	(substituted on) 39'
Coach:
(Argentina) Rodolfo Ambrosio

Touch judges:
Harry Mason (Canada)
Doug Hamre (Canada)

Notes:

- This was the first time that these two teams played each other.
- Rob Brouwer, Brock Staller, Michael Hamson, Joe Dolesau, Eric Howard, Brett Johnson and Jake Robinson made their international debuts for Canada.

=== Week Four ===
27 February 2016
18:00 CLT (UTC-03)

(1 BP) Chile	20–23	Uruguay
Try: Nordenflycht 40' m Pen: Nordenflycht (5/5) 20', 27', 37', 52', 71'	Report	Try: Favaro 17' c Silva 66' c Con: Secco (2/2) 18', 67'; Pen: Secco (3/4) 39', 49', 55'

Centro de Alto Rendimiento de Rugbt, Santiago
Attendance: 1,497
Referee: Damian Schneider (Argentina)

FB	15	Leonardo Montoya
RW	14	José Ignacio Larenas	(yellow card) 65' to 75'				(substituted off) 75'
OC	13	Matías Nordenflycht
IC	12	Francisco de La Fuente	(yellow card) 57' to 67'
LW	11	Italo Zunino
FH	10	Cristian Onetto
SH	9	Beltrán Vergara
N8	8	Benjamín Soto (c)
OF	7	Javier Richard
BF	6	Cristobál Niedmann		(substituted off) 68'
RL	5	Raimundo Piwonka			(substituted off) 61'
LL	4	Nikola Bursic		50' to 61'
TP	3	Luis Sepúlveda				(substituted off) 70'	(substituted on) 75'
HK	2	Rodrigo Moya		(substituted off) 40'
LP	1	Nicolás Venegas		11' to 18'		(substituted off) 40'
Replacements:
HK	16	Manuel Gurruchaga		(substituted on) 40'
PR	17	Roberto Oyarzun	(yellow card) 72' to 80'	(substituted on) 11'	(substituted off) 18'	(substituted on) 70'
PR	18	José Tomás Munita				(substituted on) 40'
FL	19	Ignacio Silva		(substituted on) 68'
LK	20	Ignacio Alvárez		(substituted on) 50'
SH	21	Matthieu Manas
FB	22	Pablo Casas
WG	23	Matías Contreras
Coach:
(Chile) Elías Santillán

FB	15	Rodrigo Silva
RW	14	Federico Favaro				(substituted off) 57'
OC	13	Andrés Vilaseca		26' to 28'
IC	12	Alberto Román
LW	11	Leandro Leivas	(yellow card) 26' to 36'
FH	10	Martín Secco
SH	9	Guillermo Lijtenstein		(substituted off) 53'
N8	8	Alejandro Nieto
OF	7	Matías Beer		(substituted off) 56'
BF	6	Juan Manuel Gaminara (c)
RL	5	Mathias Palomeque		(substituted off) 53'
LL	4	Diego Magno
TP	3	Juan Echeverría		(substituted off) 56'
HK	2	Germán Kessler		(substituted off) 50'
LP	1	Mateo Sanguinetti	(yellow card) 69' to 79'			(substituted off) 79'
Replacements:
PR	16	Carlos Arboleya		(substituted on) 50'
PR	17	Facundo Gattas		(substituted on) 56'
PR	18	Rafael Mones			(substituted on) 75'
LK	19	Gonzalo Soto		(substituted on) 53'
FL	20	Juan Diego Ormaechea		(substituted on) 56'	(substituted off) 75'	(substituted on) 79'
FH	21	Manuel Blengio
SH	22	Santiago Arata		(substituted on) 53'
CE	23	Pedro Deal		(substituted on) 26'	(substituted off) 28'	(substituted on) 57'
Coach:
(Argentina) Esteban Meneses

Touch judges:
Claudio Ruz (Chile)
Luis Díaz (Chile)

Notes:

- Rafael Mones made his international debut for Uruguay.

27 February 2016
20:00 BRT (UTC-03)

Brazil	24–23	United States (1 BP)
Try: D. Sancery 13' c L. Duque 22' m Con: M. Duque (1/2) 14'; Pen: M. Duque (4/5) 4', 7', 50', 80'	Report	Try: Taufete'e 35' m Schirmer 46' m Kruger 64' c Con: Bird (1/2) 65'; Pen: Bird (1/2) 29'; Kruger (1/1) 72'

Arena Barueri, Barueri
Attendance: 3,798
Referee: Chris Assmus (Canada)

FB	15	Daniel Sancery
RW	14	Stefano Giantorno		(substituted off) 52'
OC	13	Felipe Sancery
IC	12	Martin Schaefer
LW	11	Laurent Bourda-Couhet
FH	10	Moisés Duque
SH	9	Lucas Duque
N8	8	Nick Smith
OF	7	João Luiz da Ros (c)		(substituted off) 40'
BF	6	André Arruda	(yellow card) 39' to 49'
RL	5	Luiz Gustavo Viera
LL	4	Lucas Piero		(substituted off) 50'
TP	3	Wilton Rebolo		(substituted off) 68'
HK	2	Yan Rosetti		(substituted off) 62'
LP	1	Lucas Abud		(substituted off) 57'
Replacements:
HK	16	Daniel Danielewicz		(substituted on) 62'
PR	17	Caique Silva		(substituted on) 68'
PR	18	Jonatas Paulo		(substituted on) 57'
LK	19	Diego López		(substituted on) 50'
FL	20	Gabriel Paganini		(substituted on) 40'
FB	21	Guilherme Coghetto		(substituted on) 52'
SH	22	Beukes Cremer
FH	23	Robert Tenório
Coach:
(Argentina) Rodolfo Ambrosio

FB	15	Jake Anderson
RW	14	Kingsley McGowan	(substituted off) 67'
OC	13	Mike Garrity	(substituted off) 52'
IC	12	Andrew Suniula
LW	11	Ryan Matyas	(substituted off) 52'
FH	10	James Bird	(substituted off) 70'
SH	9	Niku Kruger
N8	8	David Tameilau
OF	7	Aladdin Schirmer
BF	6	James King	(substituted off) 76'
RL	5	Ben Landry
LL	4	Brodie Orth
TP	3	Olive Kilifi (c)
HK	2	Joe Taufete'e	(substituted off) 58'
LP	1	Demecus Beach	(substituted off) 31'
Replacements:
HK	16	Cam Falcon
PR	17	Eric Fry	(substituted on) 31'
HK	18	Mike Sosene-Feagai	(substituted on) 58'
FL	19	Hanco Germishuys	(substituted on) 76'
FH	20	Mike Te'o	(substituted on) 67'
FH	21	JP Eloff	(substituted on) 70'
WG	22	Tim Stanfill	(substituted on) 52'
CE	23	Chad London	(substituted on) 52'
Coach:
(New Zealand) John Mitchell

Touch judges:
Henrique Platais (Brazil)
Ricardo Sant'Anna (Brazil)

Notes:

- This was the first meeting between these two teams.
- This was Brazil's first ever victory over a Tier 2 nation.
- André Arruda made his international debut for Brazil.
- Hanco Germishuys, James King and Aladdin Schirmer made their international debuts for the United States.

28 February 2016
17:00 ART (UTC-03)

(1 BP) Argentina XV	54–21	Canada
Try: Iglesias Valdez 2' m Estellés (2) 9' c, 78' m Leguizamón (2) 28' m, 76' c Cuaranta 40' c Penalty try 53' c Amorosino 58' m Con: Mercerat (4/8) 10', 40', 54', 76'; Pen: Mercerat (2/3) 20', 43'	Report	Try: Moor 12' c Ferguson (2) 32' c, 38' c Con: Ferguson (3/3) 13', 33', 39'

Duendes Rugby Club, Rosario
Attendance: 3,000
Referee: Joaquín Montes (Uruguay)

FB	15	Pedro Mercerat
RW	14	Juan Pablo Estellés
OC	13	Juan Cappiello
IC	12	Tomás Granella
LW	11	Franco Cuaranta	(substituted off) 44'
FH	10	Juan Cruz González	(substituted off) 69'
SH	9	Marcos Bollini	(substituted off) 59'
N8	8	Santiago Portillo
OF	7	Lautaro Bavaro
BF	6	Juan Manuel Leguizamón
RL	5	Ignacio Larrague	(substituted off) 50'
LL	4	Pedro Ortega
TP	3	Enrique Pieretto	(substituted off) 67'
HK	2	Santiago Iglesias Valdez (c)	(substituted off) 69'
LP	1	Facundo Gigena	(substituted off) 61'
Replacements:
HK	16	Axel Zapata	(substituted on) 69'
PR	17	Roberto Tejerizo	(substituted on) 61'
PR	18	Eduardo Bello	(substituted on) 67'
LK	19	Marcos Kremer	(substituted on) 50'
FL	20	José Deheza	(substituted on) 56'
SH	21	Lautaro Bazán Vélez	(substituted on) 59'
FH	22	Juan Novillo	(substituted on) 69'
WG	23	Lucas González Amorosino	(substituted on) 44'
Coach:
(Argentina) Pablo Bouza

FB	15	Brock Staller		40' to 50'		(substituted off) 67'
RW	14	Dan Moor
OC	13	Phil Mackenzie
IC	12	Nick Blevins
LW	11	Duncan Maguire				(substituted off) 59'
FH	10	Pat Parfrey
SH	9	Andrew Ferguson		(substituted off) 70'
N8	8	Clay Panga		(substituted off) 44'
OF	7	Alistair Clark
BF	6	Lucas Rumball		(substituted off) 56'	(substituted on) 63'
RL	5	Cam Pierce
LL	4	Kyle Baillie
TP	3	Djustice Sears-Duru		(substituted off) 40'
HK	2	Ray Barkwill		(substituted off) 67'
LP	1	Hubert Buydens (c)	(yellow card) 53' to 63'		(substituted off) 63'
Replacements:
PR	16	Eric Howard		(substituted on) 67'
PR	17	Ryan Kotlewski		(substituted on) 40'
PR	18	Rob Brouwer		(substituted on) 56'
HK	19	Alex Mascott
N8	20	Michael Hamson		(substituted on) 44'
FB	21	Brett Johnson		(substituted on) 40'	(substituted off) 50'	(substituted on) 59'
FH	22	Gradyn Bowd		(substituted on) 67'
SH	23	Jake Robinson		(substituted on) 70'
Coach:
(France) Francois Ratier

Touch judges:
Mauro Rivera (Argentina)
Andres Sutton (Argentina)

=== Week Five ===
5 March 2016
17:15 UYT (UTC-03)

Uruguay	29–25	United States (1 BP)
Try: Kessler 49' c Magno 78' c Con: Ormaechea (2/2) 50', 79'; Pen: Ormaechea (5/7) 3', 21', 39', 59', 67'	Report	Try: Schirmer 14' c London 46' c Mikesell 72' m Con: Bird (2/2) 15', 47'; Pen: Bird (2/3) 22', 29'

Estadio Charrúa, Montevideo
Attendance: 3,000
Referee: Juan Sylvestre (Argentina)

FB	15	Rodrigo Silva
RW	14	Leandro Leivas
OC	13	Pedro Deal
IC	12	Andrés Vilaseca	(substituted off) 25'
LW	11	Gastón Mieres	(substituted off) 73'
FH	10	Manuel Blengio
SH	9	Agustín Ormaechea
N8	8	Alejandro Nieto	(substituted off) 70'
OF	7	Juan Diego Ormaechea
BF	6	Juan Manuel Gaminara (c)
RL	5	Diego Magno
LL	4	Gonzalo Soto	(substituted off) 56'
TP	3	Mario Sagario	(substituted off) 70'
HK	2	Germán Kessler	(substituted off) 56'
LP	1	Mateo Sanguinetti	(substituted off) 70'
Replacements:
HK	16	Carlos Arboleya	(substituted on) 56'
PR	17	Facundo Gattas	(substituted on) 70'
PR	18	Juan Echeverría	(substituted on) 70'
LK	19	Mathias Palomeque	(substituted on) 56'
FL	20	Matías Beer	(substituted on) 70'
CE	21	Alberto Román	(substituted on) 25'
SH	22	Guillermo Lijtenstein
WG	23	Federico Favaro	(substituted on) 73'
Coach:
(Argentina) Esteban Meneses

FB	15	JP Eloff
RW	14	Deion Mikesell
OC	13	Lorenzo Thomas
IC	12	Chad London
LW	11	Tim Stanfill
FH	10	James Bird		(substituted off) 65'
SH	9	Mike Te'o
N8	8	David Tameilau		(substituted off) 47'
OF	7	Todd Clever (c)
BF	6	Aladdin Schirmer
RL	5	Ben Landry	(yellow card) 61' to 71' (red card) 77'
LL	4	Brodie Orth
TP	3	Titi Lamositele
HK	2	Mike Sosene-Feagai		(substituted off) 22'
LP	1	Eric Fry		(substituted off) 62'
Replacements:
HK	16	Joe Taufete'e		(substituted on) 22'
PR	17	Olive Kilifi		(substituted on) 62'
PR	18	Demecus Beach
FL	19	Nate Brakeley		(substituted on) 47'
FL	20	Hanco Germishuys
SH	21	Niku Kruger		(substituted on) 65'
WG	22	Ryan Matyas
FB	23	Jake Anderson
Coach:
(New Zealand) John Mitchell

Touch judges:
Alejandro Longres (Uruguay)
Francisco González (Uruguay)

Notes:

- Deion Mikesell made his international debut for the United States.
- This was Uruguay's first victory over the United States since their 10–9 victory in 2002.

5 March 2016
19:00 CLT (UTC-03)

Chile	13–64	Canada (1 BP)
Try: Soto 40' c Con: Nordenflycht (1/1) 40'; Pen: Nordenflycht (2/4) 1', 9'	Report	Try: Blevins (2) 3' c, 55' c Johnson 14' c McRorie 18' m Baillie 20' c Mackenzie 31' c Parfrey (2) 35' c, 75' c Moor 51' c Con: McRorie (7/8) 4', 15', 21', 32', 36', 52', 56'; Ferguson (1/1) 76'; Pen: McRorie (1/1) 12'

Estadio Municipal de La Pintana, Santiago
Attendance: 3,200
Referee: Kurt Weaver (United States)

FB	15	Humberto Chacaltana
RW	14	José Ignacio Larenas
OC	13	Matías Nordenflycht
IC	12	Francisco de La Fuente
LW	11	Italo Zunino
FH	10	Cristian Onetto	(substituted off) 47'
SH	9	Juan Pablo Perrotta	(substituted off) 57'
N8	8	Nikola Bursic	(substituted off) 59'
OF	7	Javier Richard	(substituted off) 67'
BF	6	Benjamín Soto (c)
RL	5	Raimundo Piwonka
LL	4	Ignacio Alvárez	(substituted off) 45'
TP	3	José Tomás Munita	(substituted off) 40'
HK	2	Manuel Gurruchaga
LP	1	José Ramón Ayarza	(substituted off) 57'
Replacements:
HK	16	Rodrigo Moya
PR	17	Nicolás Venegas	(substituted on) 57'
PR	18	Luis Sepúlveda	(substituted on) 40'
FL	19	Cristobál Niedmann	(substituted on) 45'
FL	20	Francisco Hurtado	(substituted on) 59'
FL	21	Ignacio Silva	(substituted on) 67'
SH	22	Beltrán Vergara	(substituted on) 57'
FB	23	Pablo Casas	(substituted on) 47'
Coach:
(Chile) Elías Santillán

FB	15	Brock Staller	(substituted off) 67'
RW	14	Dan Moor
OC	13	Phil Mackenzie
IC	12	Nick Blevins
LW	11	Brett Johnson	(substituted off) 53'
FH	10	Pat Parfrey
SH	9	Gordon McRorie	(substituted off) 57'
N8	8	Lucas Rumball	(substituted off) 53'
OF	7	Alistair Clark	(substituted off) 57'
BF	6	Kyle Baillie
RL	5	Cameron Pierce
LL	4	Paul Ciulini
TP	3	Djustice Sears-Duru	(substituted off) 57'
HK	2	Ray Barkwill	(substituted off) 53'
LP	1	Hubert Buydens (c)	(substituted off) 57'
Replacements:
HK	16	Eric Howard	(substituted on) 53'
PR	17	Rob Brouwer	(substituted on) 57'
PR	18	Ryan Kotlewski	(substituted on) 57'
FL	19	Clay Panga	(substituted on) 53'
N8	20	Michael Hamson	(substituted on) 57'
SH	21	Andrew Ferguson	(substituted on) 57'
FH	22	Gradyn Bowd	(substituted on) 67'
WG	23	Duncan Maguire	(substituted on) 53'
Coach:
(France) Francois Ratier

Touch judges:
Ignacio Calle (Chile)
Francisco Saavedra (Chile)

Notes:

- Ryan Kotlewski made his international debut for Canada.

5 March 2016
20:00 BRT (UTC-03)

Brazil	7–42	Argentina XV (1 BP)
Try: L. Duque 80' c Con: M. Duque (1/1) 80'	Report	Try: Estellés (3) 8' c, 36' c, 77' c González 11' c Deheza 20' c Delguy 73' c Con: Mercerat (6/6) 9', 12', 22', 37', 74', 77'

Estádio Martins Pereira, São José dos Campos
Attendance: 3,401
Referee: Chris Assmus (Canada)

FB	15	Daniel Sancery
RW	14	Lucas Tranquez
OC	13	Felipe Sancery
IC	12	Matheus Cruz	(substituted off) 50'
LW	11	Laurent Bourda-Couhet
FH	10	Moisés Duque
SH	9	Lucas Duque
N8	8	Nick Smith (c)
OF	7	Cleber Dias
BF	6	André Arruda	(substituted off) 49'
RL	5	Luiz Gustavo Viera
LL	4	Lucas Piero	(substituted off) 68'
TP	3	Wilton Rebolo	(substituted off) 40'
HK	2	Yan Rosetti	(substituted off) 68'
LP	1	Rafael Carnivalle	(substituted off) 57'
Replacements:
HK	16	Daniel Danielewicz	(substituted on) 68'
PR	17	Caique Silva	(substituted on) 57'
PR	18	Lucas Abud	(substituted on) 40'
LK	19	Diego López	(substituted on) 68'
FL	20	Mark Jackson	(substituted on) 49'
CE	21	Mateus Estrela
SH	22	Beukes Cremer	(substituted on) 50'
FH	23	Robert Tenório
Coach:
(Argentina) Rodolfo Ambrosio

FB	15	Ramiro Moyano	(substituted off) 68'
RW	14	Juan Pablo Estellés
OC	13	Juan Cappiello
IC	12	Tomás Granella	(substituted off) 71'
LW	11	Pedro Mercerat
FH	10	Juan Cruz González
SH	9	Marcos Bollini	(substituted off) 71'
N8	8	Santiago Portillo
OF	7	Lautaro Bavaro
BF	6	José Deheza	(substituted off) 50'
RL	5	Ignacio Larrague
LL	4	Pedro Ortega	(substituted off) 49'
TP	3	Enrique Pieretto	(substituted off) 58'
HK	2	Santiago Iglesias Valdez (c)	(substituted off) 65'
LP	1	Facundo Gigena	(substituted off) 58'
Replacements:
HK	16	Axel Zapata	(substituted on) 65'
PR	17	Franco Brarda	(substituted on) 58'
PR	18	Eduardo Bello	(substituted on) 58'
LK	19	Franco Molina	(substituted on) 49'
N8	20	Miguel Urtubey	(substituted on) 50'
SH	21	Patricio Baronio	(substituted on) 71'
CE	22	Martín Elías	(substituted on) 71'
FB	23	Bautista Delguy	(substituted on) 68'
Coach:
(Argentina) Pablo Bouza

Touch judges:
Xavier Vouga (Brazil)
Ricardo Sant'Anna (Brazil)

== Statistics ==
=== Points scorers ===
Pos	Name	Team	Pts
1	Matías Nordenflycht	Chile	53
2	Gordon McRorie	Canada	45
3	Pedro Mercerat	Argentina XV	43
4	James Bird	United States	35
5	Andrew Ferguson	Canada	33
6	Moisés Duque	Brazil	26
6	David Harvey	Brazil	26
8	Juan Pablo Estellés	Argentina XV	25
8	Joaquín Paz	Argentina XV	25
10	Martin Secco	Uruguay	24

=== Try scorers ===
Pos	Name	Team	Tries
1	Juan Pablo Estellés	Argentina XV	5
1	Joaquín Paz	Argentina XV	5
3	Todd Clever	United States	4
3	Dan Moor	Canada	4
3	Daniel Sancery	Brazil	4
6	Nick Blevins	Canada	3
6	Chad London	United States	3
8	17 players on 2 tries		
