= Rugby sevens at the 2015 Pan American Games – Men's team rosters =

This article shows the rosters of all participating teams at the men's rugby sevens tournament at the 2015 Pan American Games in Toronto. Rosters can have a maximum of 12 athletes.

== Argentina ==
Argentina men's rugby sevens team roster:

- Fernando Luna
- Santiago Alvarez
- German Schulz
- Nicolas Bruzzonel
- Emiliano Boffelli
- Gaston Revol
- Bautista Ezcurra
- Rodrigo Etchart
- Franco Sabato
- Juan Tuculet
- Ramiro Finco
- Axel Muller Aranda

== Brazil ==
Brazil announced their squad on July 1, 2015.

- Fernando Portugal
- Martin Schaefer
- Juliano Fiori
- Matheus Daniel
- Lucas Duque
- Moisés Duque
- Lucas Muller
- Lucas Drudi
- Lucas Domingues
- Matthew Gardner
- Gustavo Albuquerque
- André Silva

== Canada ==
Canada announced their squad on June 23, 2015.

- Admir Cejvanovic
- Justin Douglas
- Sean Duke
- Mike Fuailefau
- Lucas Hammond
- Nathan Hirayama
- Harry Jones
- Phil Mack
- John Moonlight
- Matt Mullins
- Conor Trainor
- Sean White

== Guyana ==
Guyana announced their squad on July 1, 2015.

- Lancelot Adonis
- Claudius Butts
- Avery Corbin
- Rickford Cummings
- Akeem Fraser
- Ryan Gonsalves
- Phibian Joseph
- Peobo Hamilton
- Patrick King
- Ronald Mayers
- Dwayne Schroeder
- Richard Staglon

== United States ==
United States men's rugby sevens team roster:

- Carlin Isles
- Patrick Blair
- Brett Thompson
- Garrett Bender
- Mike Te'o
- Stephen Tomasin
- Will Holder
- Ben Leatigaga
- Nate Augspurger
- Madison Hughes
- Perry Baker
- Martin Iosefo

== Uruguay ==
Uruguay announced their squad on early July, 2015.

- Gabriel Puig (C)
- Juan Diego Ormaechea
- Nicolas Freitas
- Lucas Puig
- Federico Favaro
- Tomas Etcheverry
- Alfonso Falcón
- Rodrigo Silva
- Santiago Martinez
- Gastón Gibernau
- Ian Schmidt
- Sebastián Schroeder
