= Rugby sevens at the 2019 Pan American Games – Men's tournament =

Men’s rugby sevens at the XVIII Pan American Games
- Host nation: Peru

Cup
- Champion: Argentina
- Runner-up: Canada
- Third: United States

Tournament details
- Matches played: 20
- Tries scored: 129 (average 6.45 per match)
- Most points: (Chile) Rodrigo Fernández
- Most tries: 3 players

The rugby sevens men's tournament at the 2019 Pan American Games in Lima, Peru was held on 26–28 July 2019, with eight teams participating at the sports center in Villa María del Triunfo. This is the third appearance of Rugby sevens at the Pan American Games.

== Qualification ==
Eight men's teams qualified to compete in the tournament games. Three World Sevens Series core teams (Argentina, Canada and United States) qualified automatically, along with five other teams in various qualifying tournaments.

=== Summary ===
Event	Dates	Location	Vacancies	Qualified
Automatic qualification	—N/a	—N/a	3	Argentina; Canada; United States
2018 South American Games	27–29 May	(Bolivia) Colcapirhua	2	Chile; Uruguay
2018 RAN Sevens	22–23 September	(Barbados) Saint James	2	Guyana; Jamaica
2019 Sudamérica Rugby Men's Sevens OQT	29–30 June	(Chile) Santiago	1	Brazil
Total			8	

== Results ==
All times are in Peru Time (UTC−5).

=== Pool stage ===
==== Pool A ====
Pos	Team	Pld	W	D	L	PF	PA	PD	Pts	Qualification
1	Brazil	3	2	1	0	85	24	+61	8	Semifinals
2	United States	3	2	0	1	92	19	+73	7	Semifinals
3	Chile	3	1	1	1	108	41	+67	6	5–8th place semifinals
4	Guyana	3	0	0	3	7	208	−201	3	5–8th place semifinals

Source: Lima 2019
Rules for classification: 1) Points; 2) Head-to-head result; 3) Point difference; 4) Points scored; 5) draw.

26 July 2019
11:30

Brazil	14–14	Chile
Try: D. Sancery 1'c L. Duque 7'c Con: M. Duque (1/1) 2'; Reeves (1/1) 9'	Report	Try: Fernández 5'c Urroz 11'c Con: Fernández (1/1) 6'; Torrealba (1/1) 12'

Villa María del Triunfo Sports Center
Referee: Paulo Duarte (Portugal)

26 July 2019
11:55

United States	62–0	Guyana
Try: Melphy 0'c Noble 2'c Brown (3) 4'm, 9'm, 11'c Wheeler 5'm Tupuola 7'c Lachina 8'c Broselle (2) 10'm, 14'c Con: Melphy (4/6) 1', 2', 7', 8'; Fuala'au (2/4) 12', 14'	Report

Villa María del Triunfo Sports Center
Referee: Nehuen Jauri Rivero (Argentina)

27 July 2019
11:50

Brazil	59–0	Guyana
Try: da Silva (2) 0'm, 5'c F. Sancery 2'c Giantorno 3'm Tenório 7'c Bourda-Couhet 7'c Reeves 9'c Massari 11'c Tranquez 13'c Con: Duque (2/4) 2', 5'; Giantorno (1/1) 7'; Reeves (4/4) 7', 9', 12', 14'	Report

Villa María del Triunfo Sports Center
Referee: Dale Hall (Canada)

27 July 2019
12:15

United States	20–7	Chile
Try: Clark (3) 7'm, 7'm, 9'm Melphy 9'm Con: Melphy (0/4)	Report	Try: Blanc 5'c Con: Fernández (1/1) 6'

Villa María del Triunfo Sports Center
Referee: Francisco Gonzalez (Uruguay)

27 July 2019
15:40

Chile	87–7	Guyana
Try: Urroz 0'c Brangier (3) 1'c, 11'c, 12'c Silva (4) 2'c, 6'c, 7'm, 7'c Fe. Neira 5'c Fernández 8'c Blanc (2) 9'c, 13'm Tredinick 10'c Con: Urroz (4/5) 0', 1', 6', 8'; Fernández (7/8) 3', 5', 9', 9', 11', 11', 12'	Report	Try: Angus 14'c Con: Broomes (1/1) 14'

Villa María del Triunfo Sports Center
Referee: Cisco Lopez (United States)

27 July 2019
16:05

United States	10–12	Brazil
Try: Fuala'au 3'm Clark 6'm Con: Melphy (0/2)	Report	Try: da Silva 1'm Giantorno 11'c Con: Reeves (1/1) 12'; M. Duque (0/1)

Villa María del Triunfo Sports Center
Referee: Nehuen Jauri Rivero (Argentina)

==== Pool B ====
Pos	Team	Pld	W	D	L	PF	PA	PD	Pts	Qualification
1	Argentina	3	3	0	0	96	7	+89	9	Semifinals
2	Canada	3	2	0	1	69	12	+57	7	Semifinals
3	Jamaica	3	1	0	2	14	93	−79	5	5–8th place semifinals
4	Uruguay	3	0	0	3	10	77	−67	3	5–8th place semifinals

Source: Lima 2019
Rules for classification: 1) Points; 2) Head-to-head result; 3) Point difference; 4) Points scored; 5) draw.

26 July 2019
12:20

Canada	31–0	Uruguay
Try: Hirayama (2) 1'm, 3'm Cejvanovic (2) 5'c, 8'c Morra 10'c Con: Hirayama (3/5) 6', 9', 10'	Report

Villa María del Triunfo Sports Center
Referee: Cisco Lopez (United States)

26 July 2019
12:45

Argentina	52–0	Jamaica
Try: Schulz 1'c Luna (2) 3'm, 4'; Del Mestre 6'c Osadczuk 7'm Ulloa (2) 8'c, 11'c Vanni 14'c Con: Mare (3/4) 1', 5', 7'; Ulloa (3/4) 9', 11', 14'	Report

Villa María del Triunfo Sports Center
Referee: Francisco Gonzalez (Uruguay)

27 July 2019
12:40

Canada	31–0	Jamaica
Try: Morra 0'c Coats 3'm Duke 5'c Zaruba (2) 8'c, 11'm Con: Coats (3/4) 1', 5', 8'; Kay (0/1)	Report

Villa María del Triunfo Sports Center
Referee: Cisco Lopez (United States)

27 July 2019
13:05

Argentina	32–0	Uruguay
Try: Álvarez 1'c Del Mestre 5'm Gonzalez 6'm Mare 10'm Bazan Velez 12'm Sábato 13'm Con: Mare (1/3) 1'; Ulloa (0/2); Revol (0/1)	Report

Villa María del Triunfo Sports Center
Referee: Paulo Duarte (Portugal)

27 July 2019
16:30

Uruguay	10–14	Jamaica
Try: Passadore 7'm McCubbin 12'm Con: Pastore (0/1); Brazionis (0/1)	Report	Try: Caton-Brown 1'c Osborne 3'c Con: Adamson (2/2) 2', 3'

Villa María del Triunfo Sports Center
Referee: Dale Hall (Canada)

27 July 2019
16:55

Argentina	12–7	Canada
Try: Gonzalez 10'c Bazan Velez 12'm Con: Mare (1/2) 10'	Report	Try: Zaruba 7'c Con: Hirayama (1/1) 7'

Villa María del Triunfo Sports Center
Referee: Pualo Duarte (Portugal)

=== Classification round ===
Semi-finals
28 July — 10:00 — Lima
Chile	24
Uruguay	5
28 July — 10:25 — Lima
Jamaica	33
Guyana	19

Fifth Place
28 July — 14:15 — Lima
Chile	50
Jamaica	12
Seventh Place
28 July — 13:50 — Lima
Uruguay	24
Guyana	0

==== 5–8th place semifinals ====
28 July 2019
10:00

Chile	24–5	Uruguay
Try: Fe. Neira 0'm Blanc (2) 5'c, 14'c Fernández 7'm Con: Fernández (2/4) 6', 14'	Report	Try: Ardao 11'm Con: Brazionis (0/1)

Villa María del Triunfo Sports Center
Referee: Neheun Jauri Rivero (Argentina)

28 July 2019
10:25

Jamaica	33–19	Guyana
Try: Caton-Brown 2'c Caven 3'c Facey (2) 4'c, 8'c Osborne 10'm Con: Adamson (4/5) 2', 3', 4', 8'	Report	Try: King (2) 11'c, 14'c Schroeder 12'm Con: Broomes (2/3) 11', 14'

Villa María del Triunfo Sports Center
Referee: Cisco Lopez (United States)

==== Seventh place match ====
28 July 2019
13:50

Uruguay	24–0	Guyana
Try: Plottier 2'c Ubilla 7'c Brazionis 9'm Viñals 12'm Con: Ubilla (2/3) 3', 7'; Brazionis (0/1)

Villa María del Triunfo Sports Center
Referee: Cisco Lopez (United States)

==== Fifth place match ====
28 July 2019
14:15

Chile	50–12	Jamaica
Try: Brangier 2'c Sigren 4'm Blanc 5'm Silva (2) 7'c, 14'c Penalty try 7'; Tredinick 9'm Fe. Neira 10'c Con: Fernández (2/5) 3', 7'; Tredinick (2/2) 11', 14'	Report	Try: Dixon 6'c Smith 12'm Con: Adamson (1/2) 6'

Villa María del Triunfo Sports Center
Referee: Francisco Gonzalez (Uruguay)

=== Medal round ===
Semi-finals
28 July — 11:40 — Lima
Brazil	5
Canada	35
28 July — 12:05 — Lima
Argentina	31
United States	7

Final
28 July — 16:00 — Lima
Canada	10
Argentina	33
Third Place
28 July — 15:05 — Lima
Brazil	19
United States	24 (a.e.t.)

==== Semifinals ====
28 July 2019
11:40

Brazil	5–35	Canada
Try: Tranquez 2'm Con: M. Duque (0/1)	Report	Try: Berna (2) 1'c, 4'c Cejvanovic 6'c Zaruba 8'c Jones 13'c Con: Hirayama (5/5) 2', 4', 6', 8', 13'

Villa María del Triunfo Sports Center
Referee: Paulo Duarte (Portugal)

28 July 2019
12:05

Argentina	31–7	United States
Try: Luna (2) 2'c, 3'c Osadczuk 6'c Álvarez 9'm Vanni 14'm Con: Mare (3/4) 2', 4', 7'; Bazan Velez (0/1)	Report	Try: Clark 0'c Con: Melphy (1/1) 0'

Villa María del Triunfo Sports Center
Referee: Francisco Gonzalez (Uruguay)

==== Bronze medal match ====
28 July 2019
15:05

Brazil	19–24 (a.e.t.)	United States
Try: Tranquez 5'c F. Sancery 7'c L. Duque 8'm Con: M. Duque (1/1) 6'; L. Duque (1/1) 7'; Reeves (0/1)	Report	Try: Wheeler (2) 3'c, 10'c Clark 12'm Tupuola 19'; Con: Melphy (2/3) 4', 11'; Drop: Melphy (0/1)

Villa María del Triunfo Sports Center
Referee: Dale Hall (Canada)

==== Gold medal match ====
28 July 2019
16:00

(silver) Canada	10–33	Argentina (gold)
Try: Morra 0'm Duke 14'm Con: Hirayama (0/2)	Report	Try: Gonzalez (2) 2'c, 4'c Schulz 5'c Sábato 10'c Bazan Velez 12'm Con: Mare (4/5) 2', 4', 6', 11'

Villa María del Triunfo Sports Center
Referee: Paulo Duarte (Portugal)

== Final ranking ==
Rank	Team
1st place, gold medalist(s)	Argentina
2nd place, silver medalist(s)	Canada
3rd place, bronze medalist(s)	United States
4	Brazil
5	Chile
6	Jamaica
7	Uruguay
8	Guyana

2019 Pan American Games winners

Argentina
1st title
