= Jake Robinson (rugby union) =

Canada international rugby union player

- Full name: Jacob Robinson
- Born: June 3, 1988 (age 38)
- School: St. Albert Catholic High School

Rugby union career
- Position: Scrum-half
International career
Years	Team	Apps	(Points)
2016–	Canada	1	(0)

Jacob Robinson (born June 3, 1988) is a Canadian former international rugby union player.

Robinson, a native of St. Albert, Alberta, was a soccer player growing up, until switching to rugby in junior high school. He is a graduate of St. Albert Catholic High School and played his early rugby for the St. Albert Rugby Football Club.

A specialist scrum-half, Robinson gained a call up to the national team for the 2016 Americas Rugby Championship, where he was capped off the bench in Canada's win over Brazil in Langford, British Columbia.

Robinson was awarded the Labatt Cup as the Edmonton Rugby Union's "Player of the Year" in 2016.

== See also ==
- List of Canada national rugby union players
