= Francois Ratier =

French rugby union player & coach

- Born: August 12, 1972 (age 54) La Rochefoucauld, Charente, France

Rugby union career
- Position: Wing
Senior career
Years	Team	Apps	(Points)
1989-1999	SC Angoulême		
Coaching career
- Years: Team
- 2016: Canada (Interim)
- 2014: Canada (Asst. coach)
- 2013-2017: Canada women's
- 2009-2012: Canada U17's
- 2009: Canada A
- 2009: Rugby Quebec
- 2009: The Rock (Asst. coach)
- 2007-2008: Concordia University
- 2006-2011: St. Anne de Bellevue RFC
- 2003-2008: Rugby Club de Montreal
- 2025-: France women's

Francois Ratier (born August 12, 1972) is a French rugby union and Canadian coach. He was the head coach of the Canada women's national rugby union team. He led them to their first Finals appearance at the 2014 Women's Rugby World Cup in his homeland. He took over the reins as head coach in March 2013.

In January 2016, he became an interim head coach for the Canadian national men's side during the 2016 Americas Rugby Championship, where he led the side to third in the tournament with victories over Uruguay, Chile and Brazil.

Since November 2025 he has been the French women's national team head coach.

Sporting positions
Preceded by (New Zealand) Kieran Crowley	Canada National Rugby Union Coach (Interim); 2016	Succeeded by (New Zealand) Mark Anscombe
