= Onetto =

Onetto may refer to:

== People ==
- Cristian Onetto, a Chilean Rugby Union footballer
- Rodolfo Onetto, an Argentine actor
- Victoria Onetto, an Argentine actress
