= Lorenzo Thomas (rugby union) =

US international rugby union player (born 1997)

- Born: January 22, 1997 (age 29)
- Height: 6 ft 2 in (188 cm)
- Weight: 220 lb (100 kg)
- School: Union High School
- University: Lindenwood University

Rugby union career
- Position: Centre
International career
Years	Team	Apps	(Points)
2016–2019	United States	2	(5)
Medal record
Men's rugby sevens
Representing United States
Pan American Games
Bronze medal – third place	2019 Lima	Team competition

Lorenzo Thomas (born January 22, 1997) is an American former rugby union international.

== Biography ==
A native of Tulsa, Oklahoma, Thomas was educated at Union High School and joined Air Force Prep School as a football recruit, before playing rugby with Lindenwood University in St. Charles, Missouri.

Thomas gained two caps for the United States XV as a 19-year-old at the 2016 Americas Rugby Championship, becoming the team's youngest ever try scorer in his debut match against Chile at Lockhart Stadium, Fort Lauderdale.

In 2019, Thomas won a bronze medal with the United States rugby sevens team at the 2019 Pan American Games.

In March 2021, the United States Anti-Doping Agency (USADA) issued Thomas with a four-year ban backdated to July 2019 for anti-doping rule violation after testing positive for the metabolic drug GW1516.

== See also ==
- List of United States national rugby union players
