= Kingsley McGowan =

American rugby union player

- Born: December 18, 1992 (age 33)
- Height: 5 ft 10 in (1.78 m)
- Weight: 198 lb (90 kg; 14 st 2 lb)

Rugby union career
- Position(s): Center, Wing
Amateur team(s)
| Years | Team | Apps | (Points) |
- Trinity
International career
| Years | Team | Apps | (Points) |
| 2016 - | United States | | |

Kingsley Marshall McGowan (born December 18, 1992) is an American rugby union player who plays for the United States national rugby union team, and his club rugby with Trinity in Dublin, Ireland. McGowan usually plays at the wing or center positions, but has played a variety of positions in the backs. Despite being born with missing fingers and experiencing a left knee reconstruction in 2012 that required two surgeries, McGowan debuted for the U.S. national team at the 2016 Americas Rugby Championship against the Argentina Jaguars at BBVA Compass Stadium in his hometown of Houston.

McGowan picked up the sport of rugby during his junior year of high school at St. Thomas High School in Houston, Texas. McGowan played for the U.S. national under-20 team for the 2012 IRB Junior World Rugby Trophy. McGowan played his college rugby at St. Mary's in California, where he was an All-American and led the team to the 2014 D1A national championship and 2015 D1A national championship.
