= Lucas Duque =

Brazilian rugby union player

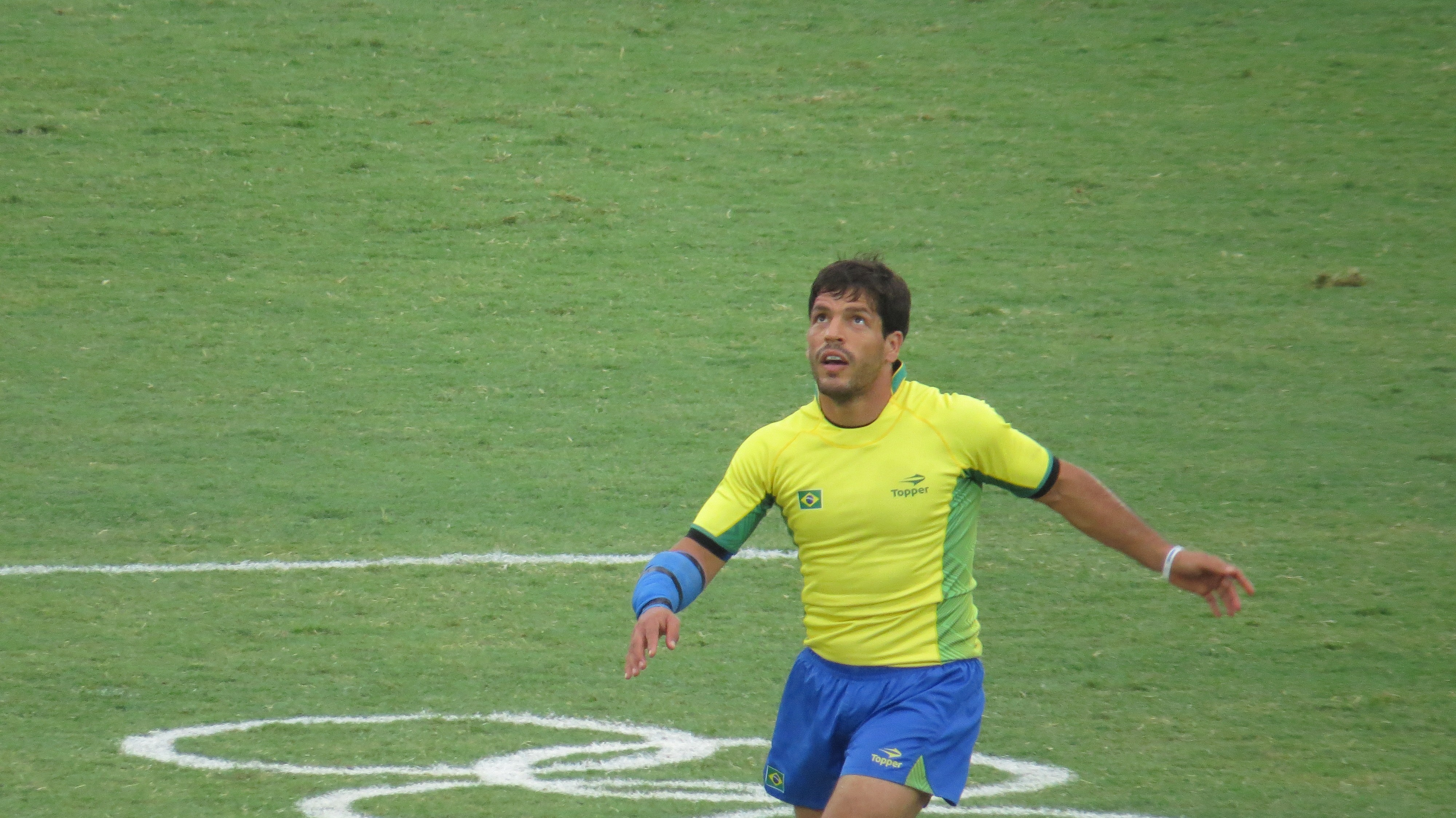
- Lucas Duque
- Born: March 15, 1984 (age 42) São José dos Campos, Brazil
- Height: 5 ft 7 in (1.70 m)
- Weight: 185 lb (84 kg)

Rugby union career
- Position: Fly-half
International career
Years	Team	Apps	(Points)
2016	Brazil	19	(24)
National sevens team
Years	Team		Comps
2014–present	Brazil 7s		

Lucas Duque (born March 15, 1984) is a Brazilian rugby union player. He represented Brazil at the 2011 and 2015 Pan American Games in rugby sevens. He also played at the 2013 South American Rugby Championship "A". Duque is the current captain of Brazil's men's sevens team. He was selected for Brazil's Olympic sevens team to the 2016 Summer Olympics.

His brother Moisés Duque is also a rugby player. He and his brother were part of the Brazilian team that defeated the United States 24–23 at the 2016 Americas Rugby Championship.
