= Cody Melphy =

American rugby union player (born 1993)

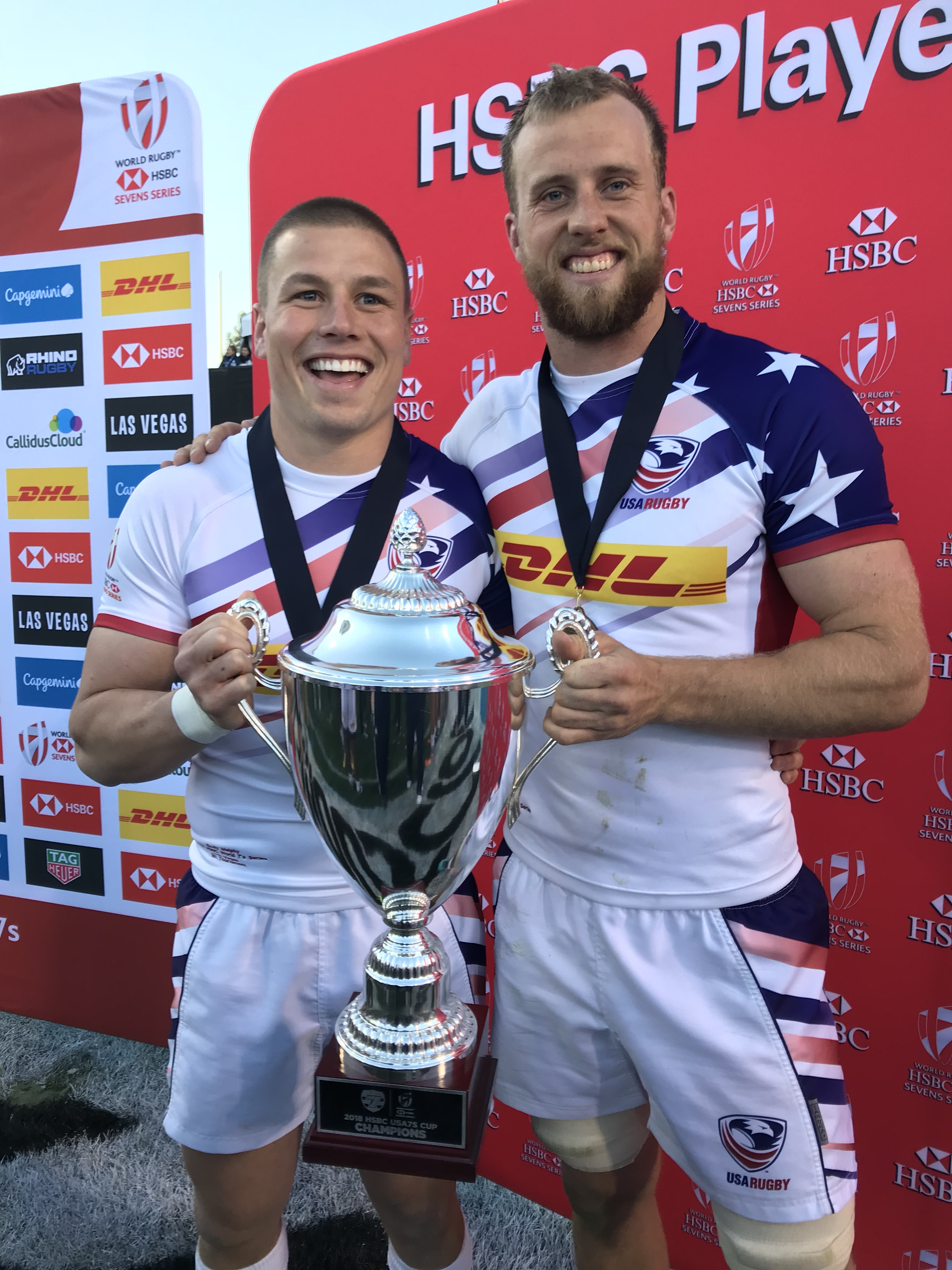
- Cody Melphy and Ben Pinkelman holding the cup after winning Las Vegas 7s
- Born: April 5, 1993 (age 33) Denver, Colorado
- Height: 1.78 m (5 ft 10 in)
- Weight: 188 lb (85 kg)
- School: Heritage High School
- University: Life University
- Occupation: Professional Rugby Player

Rugby union career
- Position(s): Hooker, Halfback
- Current team: Mens USA 7s Eagles
Senior career
Years	Team	Apps	(Points)
2018	San Diego Legion	1	(0)
National sevens team
Years	Team		Comps
2018–	United States		6
- Correct as of 17 February 2021

Official website
- https://www.usarugby.org/player/cody-melphy/
Medal record
Men's rugby sevens
Representing the United States
Pan American Games
Bronze medal – third place	2019 Lima	Team competition

Cody Melphy (born April 5, 1993) is a professional American rugby union player for the United States national rugby sevens team. Melphy was named to the team in February 2018 where he made his debut in the 2018 USA Sevens in Las Vegas. Melphy helped the U.S. to its first tournament win on home soil, the second-ever World Series tournament win in American history.

== Youth ==
Cody Melphy was born and raised in Colorado. He grew up in Littleton where he graduated from Heritage High School. From 2003 to 2010, Melphy played soccer for Real National in Colorado, coached by Joe Shaw. Captained the team to 4 state titles as a utility midfielder. Melphy played Varsity Soccer at Heritage High School under coach Adam Buseck. He was named to the All-Conference team. Melphy started playing rugby his senior year in high school for the Littleton Eagles Rugby Club under Ethan Pougnet and Charlie Riley.

== Soccer ==
Melphy attended Division II school Metropolitan State University of Denver from 2010 to 2011 under Ken Parsons. He started 19 of 20 games as a true freshman at right back in the defense. Melphy notched one assist and led the team with a +34 plus/minus rating (49 goals forced, 15 goals against) in 1,685 minutes played during the season.

== Rugby career ==
After high school he joined the Glendale Raptors men's rugby club where he played for the PRP from 2012 to 2015 under Andre Snyman. Melphy played collegiate rugby at Life University under Scott Lawrence from 2015 to 2017 where he studied Health Coaching and Business Management. He received Mid-South Player of the Month and Back of the year in 2016. In 2017 he was named a Scholz Finalist for D1A player of the year. Melphy received First team All-American awards in 7s and 15s in both 2016 and 2017. Melphy led Life University to a D1A National Championship in 2016. He also led the team to a 2017 D1A National Runner Up and a second-place finish at the Collegiate Rugby Championship, where he was named to the tournament Dream Team. During the summer of 2017, Melphy was a part of the Denver Barbarians men's 2nd-place finish at the Men's National Championships. He also captained the Collegiate All-Americans to a Bowl Championship in Serevi Rugbytown 7s.

Melphy now represents the United States national rugby sevens team as a professional athlete out of Chula Vista California, Elite Athlete Training Center. He debuted for the U.S. in March 2018 during the 2017-18 World Rugby Sevens Series.

In the Summer of 2019 Melphy Captained Team USA in the Pan American Games in Lima, Peru. The team received the bronze medal at the games. He was selected to represent the United States at the 2022 Rugby World Cup Sevens in Cape Town.

== Army ==
Specialist Melphy enlisted in the United States Army on October 10, 2017. He specializes as a Bridge Engineer Crewmember. Melphy became a part of the US Army World Class Athlete Program upon graduation from Delta co. 31st Engineer Battalion, his One Station Unit Training on February 9.

2018 and 2019 All Armed Forces Gold Medalist with US Army. 2019 All Armed Forces Dream team and Jon Snow MVP award winner. ( https://rugbytown7s.com/ )
