= Tanner Doll =

Canadian football player (born 1993)

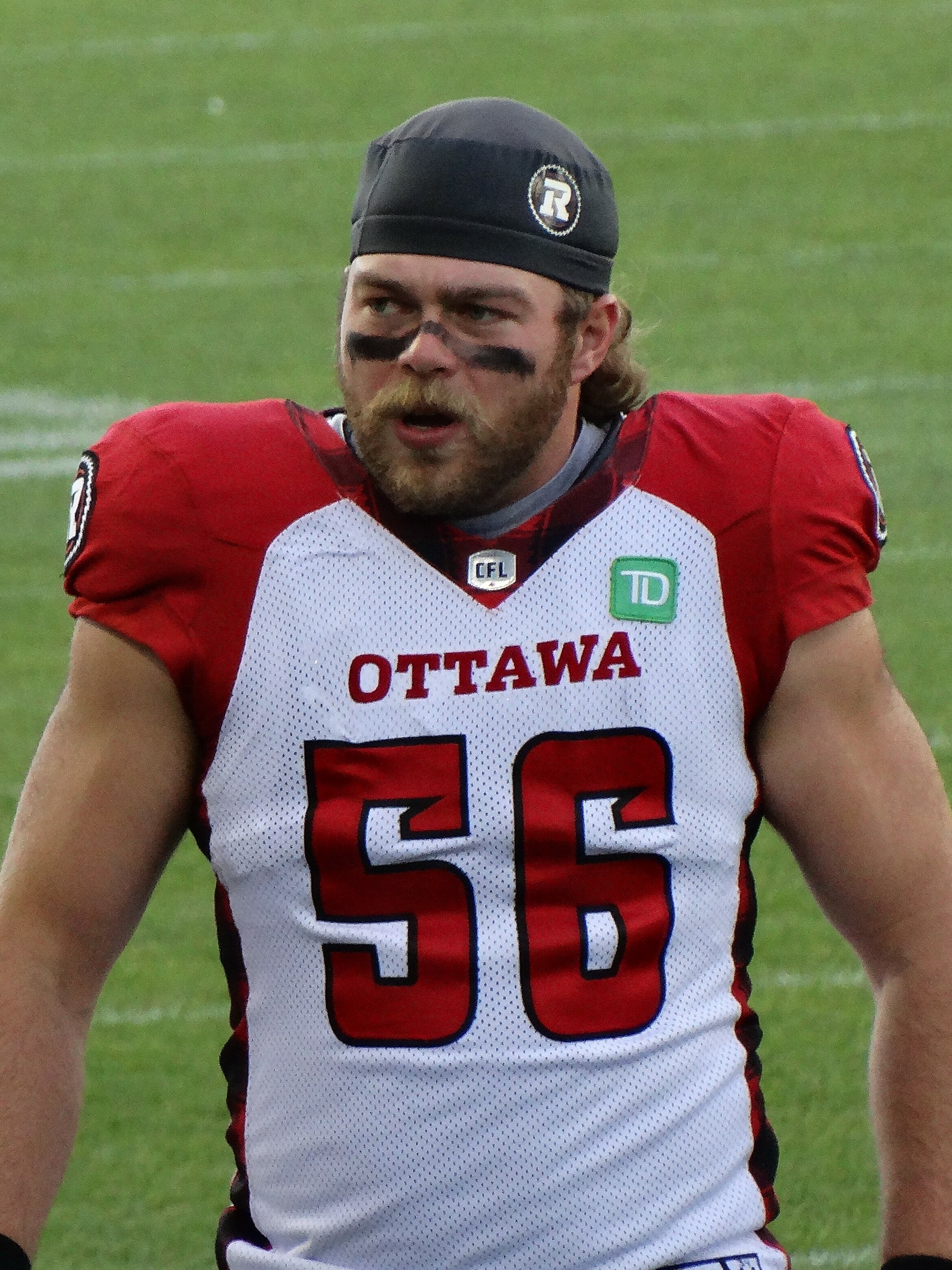
- Doll with the Ottawa Redblacks in 2023

Profile
- Position: Long snapper

Personal information
- Born: June 12, 1993 (age 33); St. Albert, Alberta, Canada
- Listed height: 6 ft 0 in (1.83 m)
- Listed weight: 221 lb (100 kg)

Career information
- High school: St. Albert High
- University: Calgary
- CFL draft: 2015: 4th round, 28th overall pick

Career history
- 2015: Ottawa Redblacks*
- 2016–2017: Ottawa Redblacks
- 2018: Hamilton Tiger-Cats
- 2018: Edmonton Eskimos*
- 2019–2022: BC Lions
- 2023: Ottawa Redblacks
- * Offseason or practice squad member only

Awards and highlights
- Grey Cup champion (2016)
- Stats at CFL.ca

Tanner Paton Doll (born June 12, 1993) is a Canadian professional football long snapper. He was originally selected in the fourth round and 28th overall by the Ottawa Redblacks in the 2015 CFL draft. He played CIS football for the Calgary Dinos.

== Professional career ==
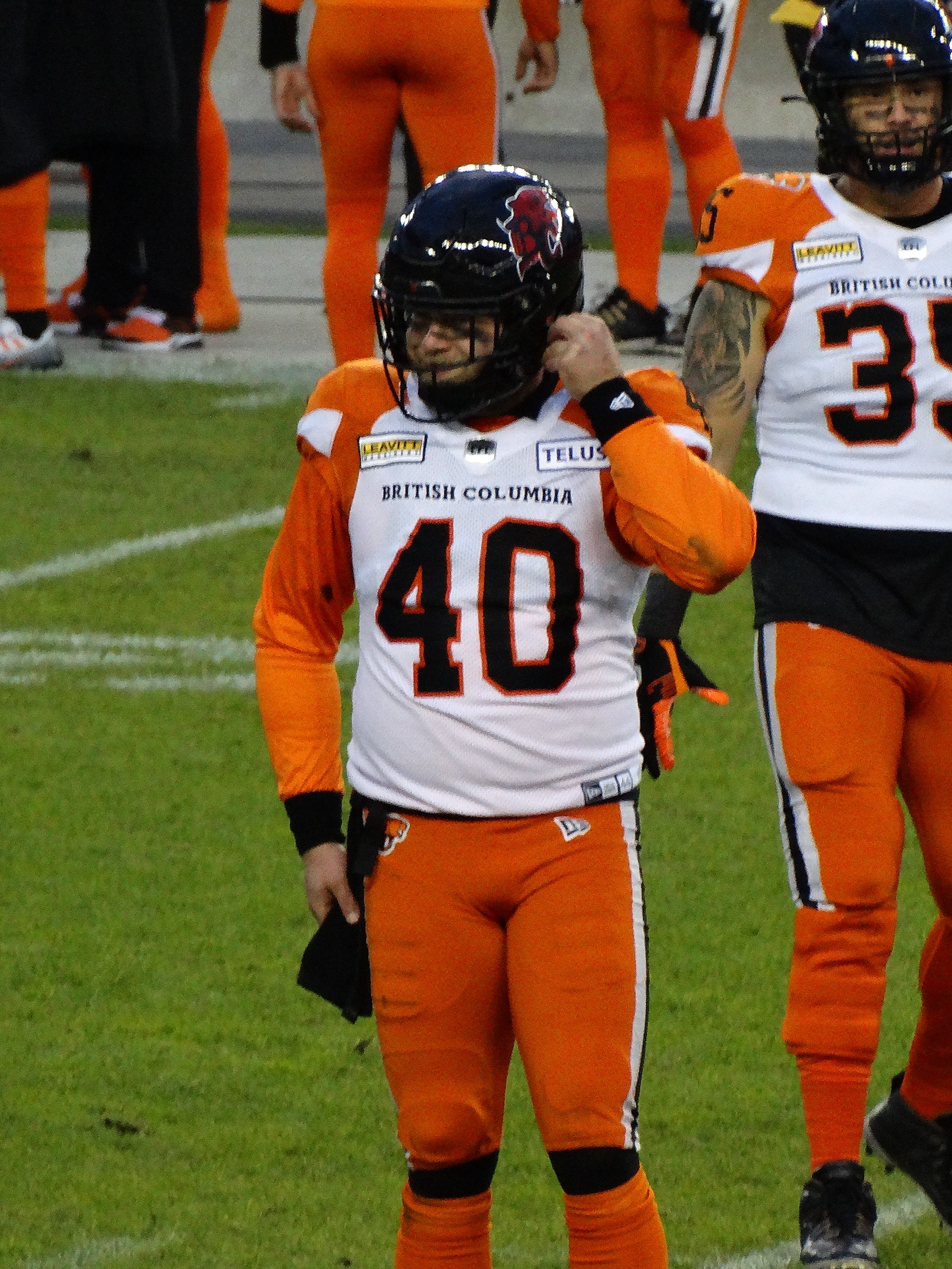
Doll with the BC Lions in 2022

=== Ottawa Redblacks (first stint) ===
Doll was drafted in the fourth round with the 28th overall pick in the 2015 CFL draft by the Ottawa Redblacks. He played in both pre-season games and spent time on the practice roster before being released on July 12, 2015 so he could finish his last year of university eligibility. He was re-signed in 2016 and started the season on the practice roster. He was promoted to the active roster as the Redblacks' long snapper on September 17, 2016 where he made his professional debut. He continued to be the team's long snapper for the final eight regular season games of 2016. He continued through the East Final into the Grey Cup where he was a member of the 104th Grey Cup championship team.

He played in 14 games in 2017. He was re-signed on February 14, 2018, however, he lost out on his long snapper position to second year player Louis-Philippe Bourassa and was part of training camp cuts on June 10, 2018.

=== Hamilton Tiger-Cats ===
Doll was signed by the Hamilton Tiger-Cats to a practice roster agreement on June 19, 2018. He played in four games for the Tiger-Cats in 2018 before being released on July 21, 2018.

=== Edmonton Eskimos ===
On August 14, 2018, Doll signed with the Edmonton Eskimos, but didn't dress for a game as he was ultimately released on September 21, 2018.

=== BC Lions ===
Doll signed with the BC Lions on February 25, 2019, as a free agent. He won the long snapper job in training camp following the release of the incumbent, Mike Benson. He signed a contract extension with the Lions on February 8, 2021. He played in 50 regular season games over three seasons and became a free agent upon the expiry of his contract on February 14, 2023.

=== Ottawa Redblacks (second stint) ===
On May 22, 2023, it was announced that Doll had signed with the Redblacks. He became a free agent after the 2023 season.

== Personal life ==
Doll spent eight years living in China during his childhood. His father, Garrett, played linebacker and was drafted in the second round of the 1985 CFL draft by the Calgary Stampeders and played for three seasons with the club. His mother, Anna-Lisa, was a member of the junior national synchronized swimming team.
