= LeMoto Filikitonga =

US international rugby union player

- Born: May 25, 1993 (age 33) San Mateo, CA, United States
- Height: 6 ft 1 in (185 cm)
- Weight: 244 lb (111 kg)
- School: San Mateo High School

Rugby union career
- Position: Center
International career
Years	Team	Apps	(Points)
2016	United States	1	(0)

LeMoto Filikitonga (born May 25, 1993) is an American former international rugby union player.

Filikitonga attended San Mateo High School, where he was a football running back, and followed two elder brothers into rugby his freshman year. He won a national championship with the Northern California Union team.

A center, Filikitonga was capped for the United States in their win over Canada in Round Rock, Texas at the 2016 Americas Rugby Championship. He suffered a serious achilles tendon injury which ruled him out of the rest of the tournament.

== See also ==
- List of United States national rugby union players
