= Rob Brouwer =

Canada international rugby union player

- Born: 10 December 1982 (age 43) Lindsay, Ontario, Canada
- Height: 6 ft 3 in (1.91 m)
- Weight: 260 lb (120 kg; 18 st 8 lb)

Rugby union career
- Position: Prop
Amateur team(s)
Years	Team	Apps	(Points)
- Lindsay Rugby Club
–	Ontario Blues		
Senior career
Years	Team	Apps	(Points)
2018-	Toronto Arrows	17	(10)
- Correct as of 3 March 2020
International career
Years	Team	Apps	(Points)
2016-	Canada	10	
- Correct as of 28 July 2019

Rob Brouwer (born December 10, 1982) is a Canadian rugby union player who played for the Toronto Arrows of Major League Rugby (MLR).

== Early life ==
Brouwer was born in Lindsay, Ontario, Canada and spent much of his early years working on the family farm and didn't start playing rugby until Grade 12 in high school. The position that Brouwer plays is Prop.

== Rugby career ==
Brouwer made his national team debut for Canada on February 20, 2016, as a substitute in a 52–25 win over Brazil.

On November 6, 2018, he signed with the Toronto Arrows for the 2019 Major League Rugby season after previously playing for the Arrows in their exhibition season in 2018.
