= Adam Zaruba =

Canadian gridiron football player (born 1991)

Profile
- Position: Tight end

Personal information
- Born: March 31, 1991 (age 35); North Vancouver, British Columbia, Canada
- Listed height: 6 ft 5 in (1.96 m)
- Listed weight: 265 lb (120 kg)

Career information
- High school: Carson Graham Secondary School (North Vancouver, British Columbia, Canada)
- College: Simon Fraser
- NFL draft: 2017: undrafted

Career history
- Philadelphia Eagles (2017–2018)*
- * Offseason or practice squad member only
- Stats at Pro Football Reference

Adam Zaruba
Rugby union career
- Position: Flanker
Amateur team(s)
Years	Team	Apps	(Points)
- Capilano RFC
National sevens team
Years	Team		Comps
2014-present	Canada Sevens		2
Medal record
Men's rugby sevens
Representing Canada
Pan American Games
Silver medal – second place	2019 Lima	Team competition

Adam Zaruba (born March 31, 1991) is a Canadian former professional football tight end. He was also a rugby sevens player for the Canada national rugby sevens team. His CFL rights belonged to the Saskatchewan Roughriders.

== Professional career ==
Zaruba signed a three-year contract with the Philadelphia Eagles as an undrafted free agent on July 24, 2017. He was waived on September 1, 2017. He signed a reserve/future contract with the Eagles on January 3, 2018.

On August 5, 2018, Zaruba was waived/injured by the Eagles and was placed on injured reserve. He was released on August 11, 2018.
