= Daniel Sancery =

Brazil international rugby union player

- Born: May 27, 1994 (age 32)
- Height: 1.82 m (5 ft 11 1/2 in)
- Weight: 94 kg (207 lb; 14 st 11 lb)

Rugby union career
- Position(s): Wing, Full-back
Senior career
Years	Team	Apps	(Points)
- UA Gaillac
2014–2016	SC Albi	2	(0)
2019−2020	Monaco Rugby	10	(7)
2020−2022	Corinthians/Cobras	4	(0)
2022−	SC Graulhet		
International career
Years	Team	Apps	(Points)
2016	Brazil Sevens	18	(27)
2016−	Brazil	27	(45)

Daniel Sancery (born 27 May 1994), is a Brazilian rugby union player currently contracted to French team SC Graulhet. He mostly plays as a wing, but can also play full-back.

== Career ==
=== Domestic ===
He joined French team SC Albi from UA Gaillac. During the 2014–15 season, he was the top scorer in SC Albi's reserve team with 16 tries, and made his Rugby Pro D2 debut for the full team in the first half of the 2015–16 season, starting on the left wing in a 27-9 away defeat by Mont-de-Marsan on 30 October 2015. He received his opportunity as SC Albi's regular winger Maxime Le Bourhis missed the match to be at the bedside of his wife, who was about to give birth.

=== International ===
On 2 February 2016, he was named by head coach Rodolfo Ambrosio in Brazil's 31-man squad for the inaugural Americas Rugby Championship.

He made his international debut for Brazil in the first match of the 2016 championship away against Chile in Santiago. The match was the very first in the new competition and, playing at full-back, he scored the ARC's first ever try in the seventh minute. His twin brother Felipe also scored later in the match for Brazil, but they lost 25-22.

He scored tries in each of his first four international appearances for Brazil, away against Chile, home (Barueri) against Uruguay, away (Langford) against Canada, and at home (Barueri) in the 24-23 win over the United States.

The Americas Rugby News website named him at full-back in its 2016 Americas Rugby Championship Dream Team. He was the only Brazil player selected.
