= Alistair Clark =

Canada international rugby union player

- Born: June 4, 1987 (age 39)
- Height: 6 ft 0 in (183 cm)
- Weight: 215 lb (98 kg)

Rugby union career
- Position: Flanker
International career
Years	Team	Apps	(Points)
2016	Canada	6	(5)

Alistair Clark (born July 4, 1987) is a Canadian former international rugby union player.

Clark, an Oakville, Ontario, native, played his rugby with Toronto club Bay Street Pigs. He was a Canada "A" representative at the 2015 World Rugby Pacific Challenge, where he scored the winning try against the Samoans.

A flanker, Clark was called up by the Canada national team for the 2016 Americas Rugby Championship and made his debut off the bench against Uruguay in Langford, scoring a try two minutes after coming on. He was the starting openside flanker for Canada's remaining four tournament fixtures.

== See also ==
- List of Canada national rugby union players
