= Jake Anderson (rugby union) =

American rugby union player (born 1992)

- Born: January 22, 1992 (age 34)
- Height: 6 ft 2 in (188 cm)
- Weight: 210 lb (95 kg)
- School: Redwood, California
- University: University of California, Berkeley

Rugby union career
- Position(s): Wing, Fullback
- Current team: Olympic Club RFC
Senior career
Years	Team	Apps	(Points)
2016	San Francisco Rush	10	(0)
- Correct as of 17 February 2021
International career
Years	Team	Apps	(Points)
2016	United States	3	(5)

Jake Anderson (born January 22, 1992) is an American professional rugby player who currently plays for Olympic Club RFC and is best known for playing for the United States national rugby union team at the 2016 Americas Rugby Championship.

== Career ==
Anderson plays for the semi-professional Olympic Club RFC in the Pacific Rugby Premiership.

On March 5, 2016, he made his debut for the United States national rugby union team as a substitute replacement at the 2016 Americas Rugby Championship.

He won five caps for the USA Eagles.

Anderson plays mostly at full-back, but also as a wing.
