= Brett Johnson (rugby union) =

Canada international rugby union player

- Born: June 8, 1994 (age 32)
- Height: 5 ft 10 in (178 cm)
- Weight: 167 lb (76 kg)

Rugby union career
- Position: Winger
International career
Years	Team	Apps	(Points)
2016–	Canada	2	(5)

Brett Johnson (born June 8, 1994) is a Canadian rugby union player.

A speedy winger from Truro, Nova Scotia, Johnson began playing rugby at his high school at the age of 16 and is a product of the Truro Saints. He also played his early senior rugby with The Rock in Newfoundland.

Johnson was capped twice for Canada at the 2016 Americas Rugby Championship, in matches against Brazil and Chile.

In 2017, Johnson left Truro to join Victoria, BC based club Castaway Wanderers.

== See also ==
- List of Canada national rugby union players
