= Wilton Rebolo =

Brazilian rugby union player

- Full name: Wilton José Murilo Rebolo
- Born: 2 August 1995 (age 31) São José dos Campos, Brazil
- Height: 182 cm (6 ft 0 in)
- Weight: 118 kg (260 lb; 18 st 8 lb)

Rugby union career
- Position(s): Prop, Hooker
- Current team: Force
Senior career
Years	Team	Apps	(Points)
2021–2022	Rugby New York	28	(10)
2023–	Western Force	1	(0)
2023	Northland	5	(0)
- Correct as of 30 September 2023
International career
Years	Team	Apps	(Points)
2015–	Brazil	35	(10)
- Correct as of 30 September 2023

Wilton Rebolo (born 2 August 1995) is a Brazilian rugby union player, who plays for the Force. His position is prop or hooker.

== Early career ==
Born in São José dos Campos, Brazil, Rebolo began playing rugby at an early age playing for a number of club sides. He made his international debut for Brazil against Germany, and has since gone on to win over 30 caps.

== Professional career ==
Rebolo represented Austin Herd in a pre-season fixture in 2020 and had signed for the side before injury and the COVID-19 pandemic ended the season, before making his debut for Rugby New York in 2021. He returned to the side in 2022, as New York won its first Major League Rugby title. His performances earned him a move to Australia, joining the Force. He made his debut in for the side, in Round 14 of the 2023 Super Rugby Pacific season against the Chiefs, becoming the first Brazilian player to play in the traditional "Top 4" professional leagues. Later in 2023, he signed for Northland to play in the 2023 Bunnings NPC.
