= St. Albert Catholic High School =

Catholic school in St. Albert, Alberta, Canada

Location
- 33 Malmo Avenue; St. Albert, Alberta, T8N 1L5; Canada; 53.6369°N 113.6375°W

Information
- School type: Catholic
- Religious affiliation: Roman Catholic
- Founded: 1967
- School board: Greater St. Albert Catholic Regional Division No. 29
- Superintendent: Dr. Clint Moroziuk
- Principal: Ryan O'Gorman
- Grades: 10-12
- Language: English and French immersion
- Colours: Yellow and Blue
- Team name: Skyhawks
- Website: www.sachs.gsacrd.ab.ca

École Secondaire St. Albert Catholic High School (SACHS) is a high school in St. Albert, Alberta, Canada and is part of Greater St. Albert Catholic Regional Division No. 29. St. Albert was originally settled as a Métis community of predominantly French Canadian background; SACHS provides both English and French immersion curriculums. The school colours are yellow and blue. The school has a capacity of about 800 students.

== Notable alumni ==
- Matt Benning - professional ice hockey player
- Tyler Bunz - former professional ice hockey player
- Paul Chalifoux - former Mayor of St. Albert; not an alumni, but taught at SACHS for 24 years, including service as vice-principal
- Tanner Doll - professional football player
- Nick Holden - former professional ice hockey player
- Jesse Lipscombe - actor, professional athlete
- Ian Mitchell - professional ice hockey player
- Kurt Spenrath - producer, filmmaker
- Ryan Stanton - professional ice hockey player
- Neil Ternovatsky - former professional football player
- Jason Thompson - actor
