= Laurent Bourda-Couhet =

Brazilian rugby sevens player (born 1994)

- Full name: Laurent Johann José Bourda-Couhet
- Born: 12 July 1994 (age 32)
- Height: 1.71 m (5 ft 7 in)
- Weight: 75 kg (165 lb)

Rugby union career
- Position(s): Scrum-half, Wing
Senior career
Years	Team	Apps	(Points)
2020−	Corinthians		
International career
Years	Team	Apps	(Points)
2015−	Brazil	19	(0)
National sevens team
Years	Team		Comps
2016−	Brazil		7

Laurent Johann José Bourda-Couhet (born 12 July 1994) is a Brazilian rugby sevens player. He competed for Brazil 7s at the 2016 Summer Olympics.
