= Naima Fuala'au =

American rugby player

Personal information
- Born: June 17, 1998 (age 28) Federal Way, Washington, U.S.
- Home town: Hayward, California, U.S.
- Height: 5 ft 8 in (173 cm)
- Weight: 180 lb (82 kg)

Rugby union career
National sevens team
Years	Team	Comps
2017–Present	United States	

Naima Fuala'au (/nɑːˈiːmə fwəˈʔɑːləʔaʊ/; born June 17, 1998) is an American rugby sevens player. He competed for the United States at the 2024 Summer Olympics in Paris.
