= Felipe Sancery =

Brazil international rugby union player

- Born: May 27, 1994 (age 32) Campinas, Brazil
- Height: 1.82 m (5 ft 11 1/2 in)
- Weight: 92 kg (203 lb; 14 st 7 lb)

Rugby union career
- Position: Centre
Senior career
Years	Team	Apps	(Points)
2019−2020	Monaco Rugby	2	(3)
2020−	Corinthians		
International career
Years	Team	Apps	(Points)
2016−	Brazil	34	(55)
National sevens team
Years	Team		Comps
2016	Brazil 7s		5

Felipe Sancery (born 27 May 1994) is a Brazilian rugby union player. He made his debut for Brazil against Chile at the 2016 Americas Rugby Championship. His twin is also a Brazilian international, Daniel Sancery. They were both named in Brazil's men's sevens team for the 2016 Summer Olympics.

He was born in Brazil to a French father and a Brazilian mother.
