= James Bird (rugby union) =

US international rugby union footballer

- Born: James Phillip Bird; January 4, 1989 (age 37) Cardiff, Wales
- Height: 1.78 m (5 ft 10 in)
- Weight: 87 kg (13 st 10 lb)
- School: Llanishen High School

Rugby union career
- Position: Fly-half
- Current team: Old Blue
Amateur team(s)
Years	Team	Apps	(Points)
- Old Blue
International career
Years	Team	Apps	(Points)
2016–	United States	3	(35)
- Correct as of 7 June 2016

James Phillip Bird (born January 14, 1989) is a Welsh-born American rugby union fly-half.

== Early life ==
Bird was born in Cardiff, Wales and attended Llanishen Fach Primary School, in the same class as British and Irish Lions Captain, Sam Warburton. He then attended Llanishen High School, and University of Bristol, UK. Upon graduating, Bird took a graduate trainee position with PricewaterhouseCoopers in London.

== Career ==
Bird moved to New York City in January 2013. Bird was selected for the United States national rugby union team for the inaugural 2016 Americas Rugby Championship. He started in the first game of that championship against Argentina, scoring 15 points on his international debut in a 35–35 draw.

He currently plays club rugby for Old Blue RFC, based in New York City.
