= Pedro Mercerat =

Argentine rugby union player (born 1990)

- Born: 26 February 1990 (age 36)
- Height: 5 ft 11 in (180 cm)
- Weight: 176 lb (80 kg)

Rugby union career
- Position: Fullback
Senior career
Years	Team	Apps	(Points)
2009–	La Plata		
2014–15	US Bressane		
2017–18	I Medicei		
2019–2024	Rangers Vicenza		
2024	Avezzano Rugby		
International career
Years	Team	Apps	(Points)
2016	Argentina	2	(14)

Pedro Mercerat (born 26 February 1990) is an Argentine rugby union player.

Raised in La Plata, Mercerat who is the son of a former La Plata Rugby Club player, started playing aged four.

Mercerat, primarily a fullback, made his senior debut for La Plata in 2009. He was the top points scorer, as well as player of the tournament, in the 2014 Torneo de la URBA season.

In 2016, Mercerat was capped twice for Argentina, scoring two tries in his second appearance, against Chile.

Mercerat had a stint at French club US Bressane in 2014/15 and then played in Italy with I Medicei in 2017/18. He played for Italian side Rangers Vicenza from 2019 to 2024, before moving on to Avezzano Rugby.

== See also ==
- List of Argentina national rugby union players
