= Germán Kessler =

Uruguayan rugby union player

- Born: 1 July 1994 (age 32) Montevideo, Uruguay
- Height: 1.84 m (6 ft)
- Weight: 105 kg (16 st 7 lb; 231 lb)

Rugby union career
- Position: Hooker
Senior career
Years	Team	Apps	(Points)
2019–2020	Utah Warriors		
2020–2021	Soyaux Angoulême	27	(30)
2021–2023	Provence	43	(35)
2023–2024	Soyaux Angoulême	8	(0)
2024	Montauban	5	(0)
2024–	Rouen	8	(0)
- Correct as of 18 November 2024
International career
Years	Team	Apps	(Points)
2014	Uruguay U20	4	(20)
2015–	Uruguay	53	(70)
- Correct as of 25 December 2020

Germán Kessler (born 1 July 1994) is a Uruguayan rugby union player who currently plays for Rouen in France's Nationale.

== International career ==
In 2014, he was called by the Uruguayan U20 national team to compete at the 2014 IRB Junior World Rugby Trophy, having outstanding performances and helping the team finish 4th.

In 2015 he was named in Uruguay's squad for the 2015 Rugby World Cup.
