= Cristian Onetto =

Chilean rugby player (born 1983)

- Born: February 11, 1983 (age 43)
- Height: 1.80 m (5 ft 11 in)
- Weight: 89 kg (196 lb; 14.0 st)

Rugby union career
- Position(s): Fly-half, Centre
Senior career
| Years | Team | Apps | (Points) |
- Stade Domontois
International career
| Years | Team | Apps | (Points) |
| 2002–2016 | Chile | 65 | |

Cristian Onetto (born 11 February 1983) is a former Chilean rugby union player. He played as a fly-half or centre for Chile internationally.

== Career ==
Onetto previously captained Chile's under-19 and under-21 teams.

He made his international debut for Chile at the age of 19 in 2002 during the Rugby World Cup Qualifiers. He scored a try and kicked six points in his sides shocking 21–13 win against the United States in the competition. He also featured in Chile's second game against Canada.

He played for Craighouse Old Boys (COBS) in Chile after previously playing for Stade Domontois in France, Adus (Spain) and Old Reds (Chile).

In 2016, Chile Rugby had stated before the Americas Rugby Championship that Onetto had been capped 60 times for the Chilean national team.
