= Andrew Ferguson (rugby union) =

Canada international rugby union player

- Born: 1 May 1992 (age 34) Mississauga, Ontario, Canada
- Height: 5 ft 9 in (1.75 m)
- Weight: 190 lb (86 kg; 13 st 8 lb)
- School: Lorne Park Secondary School
- University: McMasters University

Rugby union career
- Position: Scrum half
- Current team: Toronto Arrows
Amateur team(s)
Years	Team	Apps	(Points)
2011-	Oakville Crusaders		
Senior career
Years	Team	Apps	(Points)
2019-present	Toronto Arrows	20	(25)
- Correct as of 3 March 2020
Provincial / State sides
Years	Team	Apps	(Points)
2011-present	Ontario Blues		
International career
Years	Team	Apps	(Points)
2011–2012	Canada u20s		
2016-	Canada	10	(17)
2017-	Canada Selects		

Andrew Ferguson (born 1 May 1992) is a Canadian rugby union player who plays as a scrum half for the Toronto Arrows in Major League Rugby (MLR) and for Canada internationally.
