= Santiago Iglesias Valdez =

Argentine rugby union player (born 1993)

Santiago Iglesias
- Full name: Santiago Iglesias Valdez
- Born: 22 May 1993 (age 33) Buenos Aires, Argentina
- Height: 1.78 m (5 ft 10 in)
- Weight: 110 kg (17 st 5 lb; 243 lb)

Rugby union career
- Position: Hooker
- Current team: Uni Tucumán
Amateur team(s)
Years	Team	Apps	(Points)
2011–13	Uni Tucumán		
Senior career
Years	Team	Apps	(Points)
2012–	Uni Tucumán	0	(0)
2014-15	Pampas XV		
- Correct as of 25 August 2013
International career
Years	Team	Apps	(Points)
2012–13	Argentina U20	17	(0)
2013-	Argentina	11	(5)
- Correct as of 22 Apr 2016

Santiago Iglesias Valdez (born 22 May 1993) is an Argentine rugby union footballer who plays as a hooker for Uni Tucumán. Despite only earning two caps for the Argentina national rugby union team (the Pumas) in the Tier 2 rugby tournament, South American Rugby Championship, he was selected by new head coach Daniel Hourcade for the Pumas 2013 end-of-year rugby union tests to Europe to face England, Wales and Italy.
