= Marcos Bollini =

Argentine rugby union player (born 1991)

- Born: 18 August 1991 (age 35) Buenos Aires, Argentina
- Height: 5 ft 8 in (173 cm)
- Weight: 180 lb (82 kg)

Rugby union career
- Position: Scrum-half
International career
Years	Team	Apps	(Points)
2016	Argentina	1	(0)

Marcos Bollini (born 18 August 1991) is an Argentine international rugby union player.

Bollini was an Argentina under-20s representative at the 2011 IRB Junior World Championship.

A Buenos Aires native, Bollini was capped for Argentina as the scrum-half in a Test against Uruguay at Colonia del Sacramento in 2016, won by the Pumas 8–0. He played his club rugby for Club Newman.

== See also ==
- List of Argentina national rugby union players
