= Paul Ciulini =

Canada international rugby union player

- Born: 28 October 1995 (age 31) Maple, Ontario, Canada
- Height: 6 ft 5 in (1.96 m)
- Weight: 275 lb (125 kg; 19 st 9 lb)

Rugby union career
- Position: Lock
Amateur team(s)
Years	Team	Apps	(Points)
- Aurora Barbarians
–	Ontario Blues		
Senior career
Years	Team	Apps	(Points)
2018-	Toronto Arrows	21	(5)
- Correct as of 7 March 2020
International career
Years	Team	Apps	(Points)
2015	Canada U20	6	(5)
2016-	Canada	8	(5)

Paul Ciulini (born October 28, 1995) is a Canadian rugby union player who plays for the Toronto Arrows of Major League Rugby (MLR). The position he plays is lock.

== Rugby career ==
Ciulini first started playing rugby with the Aurora Barbarians in 2007 with their under-12 team. Ciulini first earned national team honours with the Canada U20 team in 2015.

Ciulini earned his first cap for Canada on February 6, 2016, in a 33–17 win over Uruguay.

Ciulini played for the Toronto Arrows in 2018 during their exhibition season. On November 6, 2018, Ciulini signed with the Arrows ahead of their 2019 debut season in Major League Rugby. His first match with the Arrows was on January 26, 2019, against the NOLA Gold.

== Club statistics ==
As of 7 March 2020

Season	Team	Games	Starts	Sub	Tries	Cons	Pens	Drops	Points	Yel	Red
MLR 2019	Toronto Arrows	16	15	1	1	0	0	0	5	0	0
MLR 2020	Toronto Arrows	5	5	0	0	0	0	0	0	0	0
Total		21	20	1	1	0	0	0	5	0	0
