= Dan Moor =

Canada international rugby union player

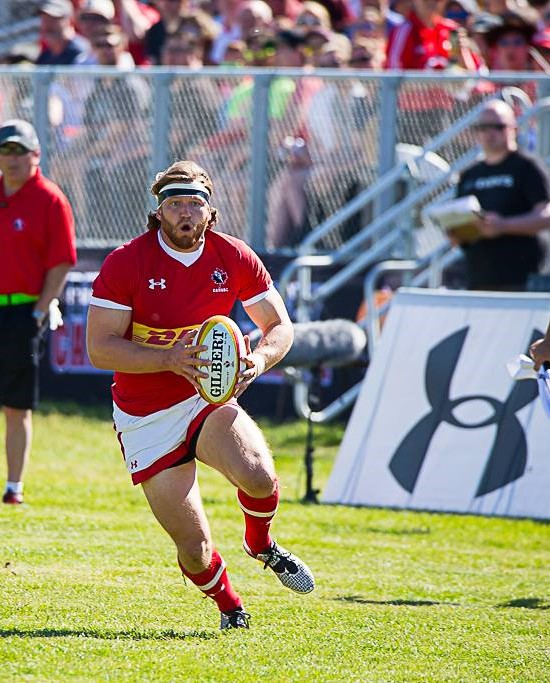
- Born: 24 July 1990 (age 36) Toronto, Ontario, Canada
- Height: 6 ft 0 in (1.83 m)
- Weight: 220 lb (100 kg)
- School: Crescent School
- University: Queen's University; Oxford University

Rugby union career
- Position: Wing / Centre
- Current team: Toronto Arrows
Amateur team(s)
Years	Team	Apps	(Points)
-2017	Balmy Beach RFC		
2017	Oxford University		
Senior career
Years	Team	Apps	(Points)
2018–19	Yorkshire Carnegie	8	(15)
2019–2020	Toronto Arrows	21	(55)
- Correct as of 3 March 2020
Provincial / State sides
Years	Team	Apps	(Points)
2009–2017	Ontario Blues		
International career
Years	Team	Apps	(Points)
2016–2020	Canada	14	(20)
- Correct as of 24 June 2020

Dan Moor (born 24 July 1990) is a former Canadian rugby union player, who played Wing and Centre for the Canada national team. He played for the Toronto Arrows in Major League Rugby (MLR), serving as captain for two seasons. Moor joined the Arrows from Yorkshire Carnegie in the RFU Championship. Moor previously had English professional rugby experience through a trial with Premiership Rugby club Wasps RFC.

== Playing career ==
=== Ontario Blues ===
Moor was a member of the Ontario Blues team that won 6 Canadian Rugby Championships from 2011 to 2018.

=== Oxford University ===
While studying for his master's degree, Moor played for Oxford University in the 2017 Varsity Match against Cambridge University R.U.F.C. During his studies at Oxford, Moor also represented Canada versus the New Zealand Māori All Blacks at BC Place in Vancouver.

=== Wasps ===
Moor was on trial with then-Premiership Rugby club Wasps RFC over a period of 3-months during his studies at Oxford University. He appeared in 3 Aviva ' A' League matches For Wasps and scored 3 tries across the 3 matches, including 2 tries on debut against Northampton Wanderers at Franklin's Gardens.

=== Yorkshire Carnegie ===
On 14 August 2018, it was announced that Moor was being trialled at then-RFU Championship club, Yorkshire Carnegie. The trial was successful, and Moor was signed on 30 August for the 2018–19 season. Yorkshire finished the season 6th in the competition, with Moor scoring on his home debut.

=== Toronto Arrows & professional retirement ===
On 2 December 2018, the Toronto Arrows announced the signing of Dan Moor from Yorkshire Carnegie, returning Moor to his hometown, and into Major League Rugby. Over the 2019 season, Moor served as co-captain with Lucas Rumball and scored 7 tries over 17 appearances for the Arrows, including the first try for the Arrows on home soil in MLR, and was awarded with All-MLR Second XV honours. Despite his achievements, Moor was unsuccessful in being selected for Rugby Canada for the 2019 Rugby World Cup. Moor re-signed with the Arrows for the 2020 MLR season.

On 20 January 2018, Moor was appointed as club captain for the Arrows' 2020 season, with Lucas Rumball named as vice-captain for the 2020 MLR season. Moor led for the first 4 games of the 2020 season, scoring 4 tries. When the season was cancelled due to the COVID-19 pandemic, Moor was joint-second in the League try-scorers list.

On 24 June 2020, Moor announced his retirement from professional rugby. He stated that the time away from rugby caused by the COVID-19 pandemic gave him "time and space" to ponder his transition from rugby. He took up a position with Bain & Company in November 2020, while maintaining an advisory role with the Arrows. Moor captained the Arrows to a record of 16 wins and 6 losses over his two seasons at the helm.
