= Martin Schaefer =

- Born: October 18, 1989 (age 37) São Paulo, Brazil
- Height: 1.83 m (6 ft 0 in)
- Weight: 82 kg (181 lb; 12 st 13 lb)

Rugby union career
- Position: Centre
International career
Years	Team	Apps	(Points)
2014-	Brazil	7	(0)
National sevens team
Years	Team		Comps
- Brazil

Martin Schaefer (born October 18, 1989) is a Brazilian rugby sevens player. He was selected for Brazil 7s's sevens squad for the 2016 Summer Olympics.
