= Santiago Álvarez (rugby union) =

Argentine rugby union player (born 1994)

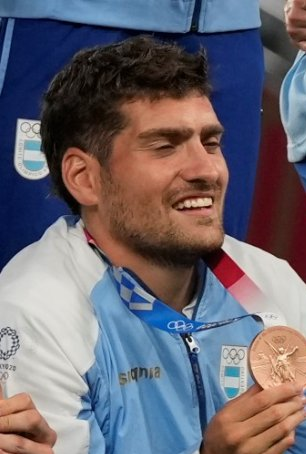
- Álvarez in 2020
- Full name: Santiago Álvarez Fourcade
- Born: 17 February 1994 (age 32) Bahía Blanca, Argentina
- Height: 188 cm (6 ft 2 in)
- Weight: 93 kg (205 lb)

Rugby union career
- Position: Centre
- Current team: CASI
Senior career
Years	Team	Apps	(Points)
2013–2018	CASI	54	(50)
2026	Chennai Bulls		
- Correct as of 22 July 2021
International career
Years	Team	Apps	(Points)
2013–2014	Argentina U20	7	(5)
2013	Argentina	3	(10)
2016–2018	Argentina XV	13	(15)
- Correct as of 22 July 2021
National sevens team
Years	Team		Comps
2013–2021	Argentina		44
- Correct as of 22 July 2021
Medal record
Men's rugby sevens
Representing Argentina
Olympic Games
Bronze medal – third place	2020 Tokyo	Team competition
Pan American Games
Silver medal – second place	2015 Toronto	Team competition
Gold medal – first place	2019 Lima	Team competition
Gold medal – first place	2023 Santiago	Team competition

Santiago Álvarez Fourcade (Note: In this Spanish name, the first or paternal surname is Álvarez and the second or maternal family name is Fourcade.) (born 17 January 1994) is an Argentine professional rugby union footballer who plays as a centre for Argentina club CASI. At international honors, he was capped three times in 2013 for the Argentina national rugby union team. In his early career, he was selected to play in the 2013, and 2014 IRB Junior World Championship for Argentina and took part in the Argentina XV, the second national team in Argentina.

In rugby sevens, Álvarez made his World Rugby Sevens Series debut in Dubai in 2013. He has also medaled at both the 2015 and 2019 Pan American Games, played at the 2018 Rugby World Cup Sevens, and competed at the 2016 and 2020 Summer Olympics. Álvarez was also called up by Super Rugby franchise the Jaguares for the 2017 and 2018 Super Rugby competitions. However, he did not make any appearances.

Álvarez led Argentina at the 2024 Summer Olympics in Paris.
