= Juan Diego Ormaechea =

Uruguayan rugby union player

- Full name: Juan Diego Ormaechea
- Born: 28 January 1989 (age 37) Montevideo, Uruguay
- Height: 182 cm (6 ft 0 in)
- Weight: 100 kg (220 lb)

Rugby union career
- Position(s): Number 8, Flanker
- Current team: Carrasco Polo Club
Youth career
- Carrasco Polo Club
Senior career
Years	Team	Apps	(Points)
- Carrasco Polo Club
- Correct as of 25 September 2019
International career
Years	Team	Apps	(Points)
2008−2009	Uruguay Under 20	9	(15)
2011–present	Uruguay	31	(30)
2013−	Uruguay Sevens		
- Correct as of 25 September 2019

Juan Diego Ormaechea (born 28 January 1989) is a Uruguayan rugby union player who generally plays as a number eight represents Uruguay internationally. He was included in the Uruguayan squad for the 2019 Rugby World Cup which is held in Japan for the first time and also marks his first World Cup appearance.

== Career ==
He made his international debut for Uruguay against Portugal on 13 November 2011.
