= Rodrigo Silva (rugby union) =

Uruguayan rugby union player

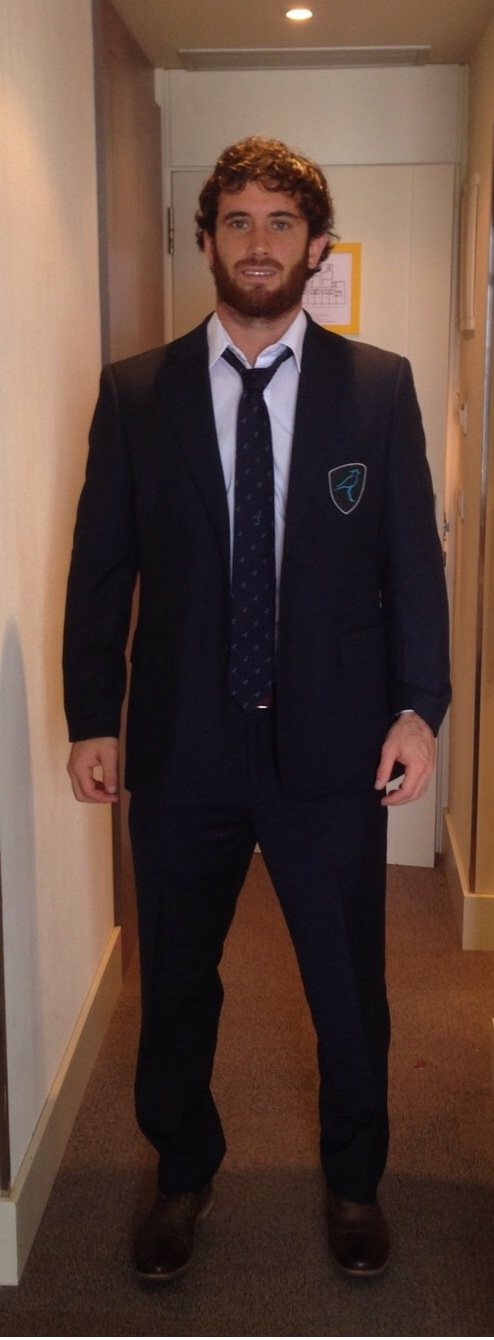
- Wearing the formal uniform of Los Teros, Uruguay's squad.
- Born: 2 November 1992 (age 34) Montevideo, Uruguay
- Height: 1.83 m (6 ft 0 in)
- Weight: 86 kg (190 lb)

Rugby union career
- Position(s): Wing, Fullback
Senior career
Years	Team	Apps	(Points)
- Carrasco Polo Club
2019	Austin Elite	12	(14)
2020	Austin Gilgronis	6	(2)
2021−2023	Peñarol		
International career
Years	Team	Apps	(Points)
2011	Uruguay Under 20	4	(3)
2014	Uruguay Sevens	2	(0)
2012−2023	Uruguay	57	(84)
- Correct as of 9 March 2020

Rodrigo Silva (born 2 November 1992) is a Uruguayan rugby union player. He plays as a scrum-half and a fullback for the Austin Gilgronis in Major League Rugby (MLR).

== Career ==
He previously played for Carrasco Polo Club at the Campeonato Uruguayo de Rugby.

He has 18 caps for Uruguay, since his debut in 2012, with 3 tries scored, 15 points on aggregate. He was named in Uruguay's squad for the 2015 Rugby World Cup. He played in all the four games, without scoring.
