= Moisés Duque =

Brazilian rugby union player (born 1988)

- Born: December 21, 1988 (age 37)
- Height: 1.75 m (5 ft 9 in)
- Weight: 92 kg (203 lb; 14 st 7 lb)

Rugby union career
- Position: Centre
Amateur team(s)
Years	Team	Apps	(Points)
2013−2020	São José Rugby Club		
Senior career
Years	Team	Apps	(Points)
2012−2013	Blagnac	1	(0)
2020−	Cobras Brasil XV		
International career
Years	Team	Apps	(Points)
2013-Present	Brazil	35	(198)
National sevens team
Years	Team		Comps
- Brazil

Moisés Rodrigues Duque (born 21 December 1988 in São José dos Campos) is a Brazilian rugby union player. He plays as a centre.

The player has already played for Blagnac, a French team that was (at the time) playing in the third division in his country.

== Career ==
He played for São José Rugby Clube in the Campeonato Brasileiro de Rugby. He played briefly for Blagnac at the Fédérale 1 of the French Rugby, in 2012/13. He returned afterwards to São José Rugby Club.

He has 18 caps for Brazil, since his first game at 2013, with 4 try, 18 conversions, 20 penalties and 2 drop goals scored, 122 points on aggregate. He scored a conversion and four penalties in the historical 24-23 win over United States at 27 February 2016, in the first edition of the 2016 Americas Rugby Championship. It was the first time the "Tupis" faced the United States and was also the first win of Brazil over a second tier rugby team. In the 2017 Americas Rugby Championship, Moisés Duque was named the competition's top scorer (with 43 points).

He is also an important player for the sevens national team side.
