= Brazil national rugby union team =

Brazil
- Nickname: Tupis
- Emblem: Tupí chief
- Union: Confederação Brasileira de Rugby (CBR)
- Head coach: Josh Reeves
- Captain: Cleber Dias
- Top scorer: Josh Reeves (156)
- Top try scorer: Felipe Sancery (11)
- Home stadium: Pacaembu Stadium
First colours	Second colours

World Rugby ranking
- Current: 33 (as of 19 June 2026)
- Highest: 24 (2019)
- Lowest: 45 (2015)

First international
- Uruguay 8−6 Brazil (9 September 1950)

Biggest win
- Costa Rica 0−95 Brazil (10 October 2006)

Biggest defeat
- Argentina 114−3 Brazil (10 October 1992); Argentina 111−0 Brazil (5 May 2012)

World Cup
- Appearances: 0
- Website: www.brasilrugby.com.br

The Brazil national rugby union team, nicknamed Tupis, is controlled by the Brazilian Rugby Confederation. Brazil is one of the founding unions of CONSUR (now Sudamérica Rugby) and played in the inaugural South American tournament. Brazil has not qualified for a Rugby World Cup, but participated in the first edition of rugby 7s in the Olympics. Brazil currently ranks 4th in South America (behind Argentina, Uruguay and Chile) and 6th in the Americas region.

Rugby union in Brazil has a long history, dating back to the late 19th century when British immigrants brought the game to Brazil's urban ports. Despite Brazil's success in association football, Brazil has historically been one of the weakest teams of the Americas, having less success than that of Argentina or Uruguay.

In the 21st century, efforts were made to revitalize the sport in Brazil. With rugby sevens being added to the Olympic calendar, Brazil was invited to the World Rugby Sevens Series, showing improvement in both the men's and women's series. In 2016, a meeting with the unions of Argentina, Brazil, Canada, Chile, the United States and Uruguay established the Americas Rugby Championship, meant to mirror the Six Nations and The Rugby Championship, and give consistent tests to the top teams in the region. After 3 close games, two of which Brazil came close to victory, Brazil beat the USA Eagles, 24–23, their first victory in the championship, as well as over the United States and a Tier Two nation. Brazil later went to have its first victories over Belgium and Portugal, marking the first time the team beat any European side and, later, a historical win against Argentina XV. This latter game, along with two wins against Chile and Colombia, secured Brazil its first South American Rugby Championship title, in 2018.

== History ==
=== Beginnings: 19th Century to 1949 ===
The very first instance of rugby being played in Brazil dates back to the late 19th century. British immigrants arriving in Brazil brought the game to various port cities in Brazil. These immigrants set up various athletic clubs which doubled with association football. The first recorded instance of a rugby game being played in Brazil was 1891, played by the São Paulo Athletic Club, under the auspices of Charles William Miller. Future efforts to promote the game were then taken on by Augusto Shaw, after Miller began to devote himself exclusively to football.

During the 1920s and 1930s, rugby began to flourish somewhat in Brazil, although it did not enjoy the widespread exposure as football. For the most part, rugby was primarily restricted to those who had British descent, or with some other connection to Britain. In 1926, a proper domestic competition was established. By 1932, a national side had formed; Brazil played its first ever national game against South Africa XV, losing by an unknown margin. The sport suffered a setback when an attempt to get it recognized as a national sport was denied, since rugby was limited to only four states than the required five. World War II suspended operations from 1941 to 1946, as was the case in many countries.

=== 1950s to 1990s ===
Brazil participated in the first ever South American Rugby Championship, but lost all three of their fixtures. They were shut out 68 and 72 to zero against Chile and Argentina respectively, while Brazil played a closer game against Uruguay, losing 10 – 17. During the 1950s, organization of rugby in Brazil was sporadic; there was no official high governing union at the time, and the national side was only organized by Jimmy Macintyre, who ran the SPAC. Brazil would not play another test until 1961. The modern day Brazilian Rugby Confederation (CBRu) was founded in 1963, in order to govern the game more efficiently in the country. The first president of the CBRu was Harry Donovan. In 1964, Brazil finished runner-up in the South American Rugby Championship, tying Chile 16–16 and defeating Uruguay 15–8.

In the 1970s the better structure of rugby allowed the game to be introduced to Brazilians outside of the British-descended community. Brazil experienced somewhat of an expansion in rugby; the game was introduced to universities throughout the country, and Brazil was becoming a destination for rugby tours. In 1974, Brazil played a test match against France, losing by a margin of 7–99. For the rest of the decade Brazil played against its South American neighbors; Brazil frequently beat Paraguay during this period.

In 1985, France toured Brazil again, but this time Brazil played much more valiantly, losing by a score of 6–41. Brazil is a charter member of CONSUR (now Sudámerica Rugby), founded in 1989. Despite this, Brazil did not officially join the IRB until 1995, and did not participate in qualifying tournaments until then. However, their first fixture in the qualifiers was a disaster; Brazil was humiliated by Trinidad and Tobago by a score of 41–0, swiftly ending their campaign.

=== 2000s: the new century ===
Brazil began the 2000s with much more success. In 2000, Brazil easily won the 2000 edition of the SARC; they repeated this in 2001, topping the group of Colombia, Peru, and Venezuela. Brazil advanced to the next round of qualifying, disposing of Trinidad and Tobago; Brazil would go on to lose their final games, but Brazil was finally starting to close the gap. Throughout the 2000s, Brazil began winning more of its games, and in 2008, finally broke through; Brazil beat Paraguay to finally advance to the top flight of the SARC, their first time there since 1989. Brazil further repeated this by beating Paraguay again in 2009.

In 2012, the New York Times reported that rugby was Brazil's second fastest growing sport, behind MMA. This is partly due to World Rugby re-investing in Brazil due to the reinstatement of rugby in the 2016 Olympics. Since then, Brazil has been invited to the World Rugby Sevens Series, allowing Brazil to improve against higher competition.

In 2014, Brazil recorded its first-ever victory over Chile, defeating the Condores 24 to 16. Since initiatives were taken in 2009, the character of rugby has changed in Brazil; the registration numbers have risen, and the sport has successfully formed sponsorships with companies such as Bradesco, many of whom see Brazilian rugby to be profitable in the future.

In 2015, Brazil played two tests against the national team of Germany, one held in Pacaembu Stadium; these performances attracted 10,000 spectators, being one of the highest attendances for rugby in Brazil. Brazil's improved form showed in 2016 in the first edition of the Americas Rugby Championship, where Brazil was on the verge of historic victories against Chile and Uruguay, but could not hold on. After scoring 25 points in their first ever fixture versus Canada, Brazil went on to upset the United States 24–23 in Pacaembu; Brazil proceeded to finish off the tournament losing 7–41 to Argentina, scoring their first try against Argentina in decades.

For the 2016 South American Rugby Championship "A", RedeTV!, one of Brazil's major TV networks, will air Brazil's games live. Brazil played Uruguay at Allianz Parque in São Paulo, one of the largest stadiums to ever host a rugby game in Brazil. Brazil tied 20–20 against Chile, further signaling their rise to the top in South America. To cap off the tournament, Brazil beat Paraguay 32–21, finishing in third place only behind Chile on points difference.

Brazil improved in the 2017 edition of the ARC, beating Chile convincingly 17 to 3, before notching their first win in only their second meeting against Canada in Pacaembu, by the score of 24 to 23. After these victories, Brazil rose to 30th, their first time in the top 30 of the World Rugby Rankings since 2009. On November 18, 2017, Brazil won on European soil for the first time in history, defeating Belgium and Portugal, further showing their progress in the 2010s. Brazil's progress continued as they beat Chile on their home soil for the first time in history, and later in the year, in the reformed 2018 South American Rugby Championship, defeated Argentina XV, marking their first-ever victory over an Argentinean side. Brazil would go onto defeat Colombia and was crowned South American champions for the first time in their history.

== Uniforms ==
Traditionally, the rugby team of Brazil has worn a strip of a yellow top and green shorts while the away strip consists of a green top and white shorts. The current provider of the kit is local based Topper. In 2015, the shorts were changed to blue, to be consistent with that of Brazil's football team; this included a presentation involving the Tupí tribe, whom the team is nicknamed after. The current shirt sponsor of Brazil is Bradesco.

== Nickname ==
For some time, Brazilian national rugby union side was unofficially associated with Walt Disney's character Zé Carioca. Sometime later, CBRu, still known as Associação Brasileira de Rugby, or simply ABR, chose Vitória Régia as its official emblem and nickname. However, this nickname was not adopted by fans.

In March 2012, CBRu announced Os Tupis as Brazil national rugby union team's official nickname, a reference to Tupi people, the main ethnic group of Brazilian indigenous people. The choice for an emblem started in 2010, when CBRu started receiving e-mails with several suggestions. The three finalists were Tupis, Sucuris (Anacondas) and Araras (Macaws). Fans voted on an Internet poll and chose Tupis with 47% (4,387 votes) of preference. According to CBRu's former president (from 2012-2016), Sami Arap, "The choice ratified the roots of Brazilian people. Tupi represents the essence of our country, referring to [our] strength, perseverance, loyalty and team spirit".

== Tournament records ==
=== Rugby World Cup ===
World Cup record								World Cup Qualification record					
Year	Round	Played	Won	Drew	Lost	Pts F	Pts A	P	W	D	L	F	A
(Australia) (New Zealand) 1987	Not invited							—					
(United Kingdom) (Ireland) (France) 1991	did not enter							did not enter					
(South Africa) 1995	did not enter							did not enter					
(Wales) 1999	did not qualify							1	0	0	1	0	41
(Australia) 2003	did not qualify							6	4	0	2	140	84
(France) 2007	did not qualify							5	3	0	2	179	108
(New Zealand) 2011	did not qualify							8	6	0	2	230	190
(England) 2015	did not qualify							5	1	0	4	85	164
(Japan) 2019	did not qualify							6	2	1	3	160	139
(France) 2023	did not qualify							3	1	0	2	55	59
Total	0/10	–						31	16	1	13	849	785

=== Americas Rugby Championship ===
The Americas Rugby Championship was held in five of the seven years from 2009 to 2015, but Brazil did not participate. Brazil along with Chile has participated in an expanded six-country Americas Rugby Championship in 2016. In the 2016 ARC, 42nd ranked Brazil defeated the 16th ranked United States 24–23, their first win against the United States.

Tourney	Record	Pts Diff	Position	Wins
2016	1–4	−68	5th	United States (24–23)
2017	2–3	−116	4th	Chile (17–3); Canada (24–23)
2018	1–4	−96	5th	Chile (16–14)
2019	2–3	−65	4th	Chile (15–10); Canada (18–10)

=== South American Championship ===
Tourney	Host	Record	Pts Diff	Position	Wins	Draws	Losses
2009	Uruguay	1–2	−129	4th	Paraguay (36–21)	—N/a	Uruguay (3–71), Chile (3–79)
2010	Chile	1–2	−34	4th	Paraguay (23–18)	—N/a	Uruguay (10–26), Chile (8–31)
2011	Argentina	1–2	−3	4th	Paraguay (51–14)	—N/a	Uruguay (18–39), Chile (6–25)
2012	Chile	0–3	−136	4th	—N/a	—N/a	Uruguay (15–27), Chile (6–19), Argentina (0–111)
2013	Uruguay	0–3	−150	4th	—N/a	—N/a	Chile (22–38), Uruguay (7–58), Argentina (0–83)
2014	No fixed host	1–2	−24	3rd	Chile (24–16)	—N/a	Paraguay (24–31), Uruguay (9–34)
2015	No fixed host	0–3	−77	4th	—N/a	—N/a	Uruguay (9–48), Chile (3–32), Paraguay (11–17)
2016	No fixed host	1–1–1	−11	3rd	Paraguay (32–21)	Chile (20–20)	Uruguay (14–36)
2017	No fixed host	1–2	+32	3rd	Paraguay (57–6)	—N/a	Uruguay (27–41), Chile (10–15)
2018	No fixed host	3–0	+81	1st	Chile (28–12), Argentina XV (36-33), Colombia (67-5)	—N/a	—N/a
2019	No fixed host	1–2	–25	4th	Paraguay (66–10)	—N/a	Uruguay XV (19-38), Argentina XV (0-62)

== Overall record ==
Below is a table of the representative rugby matches played by a Brazil national XV at test level up until 18 November 2025, updated after match with Namibia.

Men's World Rugby Rankings Top 30 as of 28 September 2026
Rank	Change (Note: Change from the previous week)	Team	Points
1	Steady	South Africa	93.09
2	Steady	New Zealand	91.15
3	Steady	Ireland	88.08
4	Steady	France	87.43
5	Steady	England	85.68
6	▲1	Australia	85.55
7	▼1	Scotland	84.78
8	Steady	Argentina	82.24
9	Steady	Japan	77.28
10	Steady	Fiji	76.81
11	Steady	Wales	76.38
12	Steady	Italy	76.30
13	Steady	Georgia	73.94
14	Steady	Portugal	69.39
15	Steady	United States	67.58
16	Steady	Chile	66.94
17	Steady	Spain	66.83
18	Steady	Uruguay	65.75
19	Steady	Tonga	65.14
20	Steady	Samoa	64.73
21	Steady	Romania	62.45
22	Steady	Canada	62.29
23	Steady	Belgium	61.03
24	Steady	Hong Kong	60.74
25	Steady	Zimbabwe	57.68
26	Steady	Namibia	56.96
27	Steady	Netherlands	56.44
28	Steady	Switzerland	55.47
29	Steady	Czech Republic	54.78
30	Steady	Poland	54.54

Brazil's historical rankings

Source: World Rugby
Graph updated to 24 August 2026

Opponent	Played	Won	Lost	Drawn	Win %	For	Aga	Diff
Argentina	14	0	14	0	0%	54	1,096	–1,042
Argentina XV	7	1	6	0	14.29%	115	343	–228
Barbarians	1	0	1	0	0%	22	47	−25
Belgium	3	2	1	0	66.67%	97	74	+23
Canada	6	3	3	0	50%	105	180	–75
Chile	34	5	27	2	14.71%	468	1,106	–638
Colombia	10	10	0	0	100%	491	47	+434
Costa Rica	1	1	0	0	100%	95	0	+95
France A	2	0	2	0	0%	13	140	–127
Georgia XV	1	1	0	0	100%	20	18	+2
Germany	5	0	5	0	0%	51	157	–106
Hong Kong	4	1	3	0	25%	68	111	–43
Kenya	2	0	2	0	0%	42	45	–3
(New Zealand) Māori All Blacks	1	0	1	0	0%	3	35	–32
Mexico	2	2	0	0	100%	126	19	+107
Namibia	1	0	1	0	0%	40	31	–9
(England) Oxford and Cambridge	2	0	2	0	0%	13	102	−89
Paraguay	33	20	13	0	60.61%	873	623	+250
Peru	9	9	0	0	100%	404	58	+346
Portugal	5	1	4	0	20%	65	173	–108
Romania	3	0	3	0	0%	47	100	–53
Spain	2	0	2	0	0%	24	89	–65
Trinidad and Tobago	5	4	1	0	80%	75	71	+4
Samoa	1	0	1	0	0%	10	48	–38
United Arab Emirates	1	1	0	0	100%	66	3	+63
United States	6	1	5	0	16.67%	102	221	–119
USA Selects	1	1	0	0	100%	33	20	+13
Uruguay	30	3	27	0	10%	318	1,053	–735
Uruguay A	1	0	1	0	0%	12	28	–16
Venezuela	9	8	1	0	88.89%	258	95	+163
Zimbabwe	1	0	1	0	0%	22	24	–2
Total	204	74	127	3	36.27%	4,145	6,190	–2,045

== Current squad ==
On 31 October, Brazil named a 30-player squad ahead of the 2027 Rugby World Cup Final Qualification Tournament.

Head Coach: (New Zealand) Josh Reeves

- Caps Updated: 13 November 2025 (after Belgium v Brazil)

Player	Position	Date of birth (age)	Caps	Club/province
Henrique Ferreira	Hooker	10 December 1999 (age 26)	15	(Brazil) Cobras
Yan Rosetti	Hooker	5 July 1993 (age 33)	41	(Spain) Barcelona
Brendon Alves	Prop	1 December 1998 (age 27)	9	(Brazil) Cobras
Vicente Galvão	Prop	15 December 1993 (age 32)	3	(Brazil) Cobras
João Lucas Marino	Prop	16 April 2002 (age 24)	5	(Brazil) Cobras
Leonel Moreno	Prop	29 August 1997 (age 29)	17	(Italy) Lazio
Wilton Rebolo	Prop	2 August 1995 (age 31)	45	Unattached
Caique Segura	Prop	21 November 1993 (age 32)	36	(France) La Seyne
Matteo Dell’Acqua	Lock	13 June 1991 (age 35)	17	(Italy) Reggio
Ben Donald	Lock	3 April 1998 (age 28)	13	(New Zealand) Thames Valley
Hélder Lúcio	Lock	18 June 2003 (age 23)	4	(Brazil) Cobras
Gabriel Oliveira	Lock	29 October 2001 (age 25)	14	(Brazil) Cobras
André Arruda	Back row	9 January 1989 (age 37)	50	(Brazil) Cobras
Matheus Cláudio	Back row	8 June 1998 (age 28)	24	(Brazil) Cobras
Adrio de Melo	Back row	21 March 2001 (age 25)	23	(Brazil) Cobras
Devon Muller	Back row	12 October 1998 (age 28)	4	(South Africa) College Rovers
Renato Santos	Back row	6 February 2001 (age 25)	2	(Brazil) Cobras
Lucas Spago	Scrum-half	19 May 2000 (age 26)	19	(Brazil) Cobras
Gustavo Gobeti	Scrum-half	20 May 2005 (age 21)	2	(Brazil) Cobras
João Amaral	Fly-half	1 January 2000 (age 26)	13	(Brazil) Cobras
Thiago Oviedo	Fly-half	9 May 2002 (age 24)	6	(Brazil) Cobras
Moisés Duque	Centre	21 December 1988 (age 37)	67	(Brazil) Cobras
Lorenzo Massari	Centre	11 January 1998 (age 28)	22	(Brazil) Cobras
Carlo Mignot	Centre	16 February 2003 (age 23)	5	(France) Biarritz
Robert Tenório	Centre	27 July 1996 (age 30)	38	(Brazil) Cobras
Théo Bastardie	Wing	26 February 2000 (age 26)	3	(France) Rouen
Raphael Hollister	Wing		3	(England) Blackheath
Sérgio Luna	Wing	14 May 2001 (age 25)	1	(Brazil) São Paulo Athletic Club
Robson Morais	Wing	2 February 1998 (age 28)	6	(Brazil) Cobras
Lucas Tranquez	Fullback	12 March 1994 (age 32)	59	(Brazil) Cobras

== Honors ==
SAR Championship

Champions: 2018

Runners-up: 1964

SAR Championship "B"

Champions: 2000, 2001, 2002, 2006, 2007, 2008, 2022, 2023

Runners-up: 2003, 2004, 2005

== Notable players ==
- In 2011 Lucas "Tanque" Duque and his brother Moisés Duque were given trials with professional teams in France.
- Since 2015 Luiz Vieira has been playing for the second team of the TOP14 team Oyonnax.

== Media coverage ==
Before 2016, most of Brazil's games were aired through SporTV, a paid television network. In 2016, changes were made to Brazil's broadcasting; more commonly available RedeTV! would air games involving the South American Rugby Championship, while ESPN Brasil holds the rights to the Americas Rugby Championship.

== See also ==
- Rugby union in Brazil
- Brazil national rugby sevens team
- Brazilian Rugby Confederation
- South American Rugby Championship
- Americas Rugby Championship
- Brazil U20
