= 2018 Americas Rugby Championship =

- Date: 27 January – 3 March 2018
- Countries: Argentina XV; Brazil; Canada; Chile; United States; Uruguay

Final positions
- Champions: United States (2nd title)

Tournament statistics
- Matches played: 15
- Tries scored: 109 (7.27 per match)
- Attendance: 51,793 (3,453 per match)
- Top scorer(s): (United States) Will Magie (38)
- Most tries: Three players: (United States) Hanco Germishuys (3); (Argentina) Santiago Resino (3); (United States) Mike Te'o (3)

The 2018 Americas Rugby Championship was the third series of the Americas Rugby Championship (sometimes informally called the "Americas' Six Nations", a reference to Europe's Six Nations Championship), which is the top elite tournament for the Americas nations. It was contested by Argentina XV (Argentina's secondary national team), Canada, United States, Uruguay, Brazil, and Chile. All matches were full international test matches with caps awarded, except those involving Argentina XV.

The Championship was retained by the United States, who became the first nation to win the Grand Slam ARC title, winning all five games.

== Participants ==
Nation	Stadium			Head coach	Captain(s)
Nation	Home stadium	Capacity	City	Head coach	Captain(s)
Argentina XV	Estadio 23 de Agosto	23,200	Jujuy	(Argentina) Felipe Contepomi	Lautaro Bavara
Argentina XV	Estadio Agustín Pichot	1,000	Ushuaia	(Argentina) Felipe Contepomi	Lautaro Bavara
Brazil	Pacaembu Stadium	37,730	São Paulo	(Argentina) Rodolfo Ambrosio	Yan Rosetti
Brazil	Estádio Martins Pereira	15,317	São José dos Campos	(Argentina) Rodolfo Ambrosio	Yan Rosetti
Canada	BC Place	54,500	Vancouver	(Wales) Kingsley Jones	Phil Mack
Canada	Westhills Stadium	1,718	Langford, British Columbia	(Wales) Kingsley Jones	Phil Mack
Chile	Estadio La Portada	18,243	La Serena	(New Zealand) Mark Cross	José Ignacio Larenas
Chile	Estadio Municipal de La Pintana	6,000	Santiago	(New Zealand) Mark Cross	José Ignacio Larenas
United States	StubHub Center	27,000	Carson, California	(South Africa) Gary Gold	Blaine Scully
United States	Papa Murphy's Park	11,569	Sacramento, California	(South Africa) Gary Gold	Blaine Scully
United States	Titan Stadium	10,000	Fullerton, California	(South Africa) Gary Gold	Blaine Scully
Uruguay	Estadio Domingo Burgueño	22,000	Maldonado	(Argentina) Esteban Meneses	Juan Manuel Gaminara
Uruguay	Estadio Charrúa	14,000	Montevideo	(Argentina) Esteban Meneses	Juan Manuel Gaminara

== Table ==
Pos	Nation (rank)	Games				Points			Tries	Bonus points		Table points
Pos	Nation (rank)	Played	Won	Drawn	Lost	For	Against	Diff	Tries	4 tries	7 Pts loss	Table points
1	United States	5	5	0	0	197	68	+129	28	4	0	24
2	Argentina XV	5	4	0	1	169	69	+100	24	4	1	21
3	Uruguay	5	3	0	2	168	157	+11	23	2	0	14
4	Canada	5	2	0	3	132	129	+3	18	3	0	11
5	Brazil	5	1	0	4	63	159	–96	6	0	0	4
6	Chile	5	0	0	5	71	218	–147	10	0	1	1
Points are awarded to the teams as follows: Win - 4 points Draw - 2 points 4 or more tries - 1 point Loss within 7 points - 1 point Loss greater than 7 points - 0 points Rank refers to World Rugby Rankings before the start of the tournament

== Fixtures ==
The tournament will be played in a round-robin format, with each team playing the five others once. The fixtures were announced on 10 December 2017. The opening fixture will take place a week early to the following two games of the same round, with it doubling up as a 2019 Rugby World Cup Americas qualifier match for Canada and Uruguay.

=== Week 1 ===
27 January 2018
17:00 PST (UTC-08)

(1 BP) Canada	29–38	Uruguay (1 BP)
Try: Olmstead 17' c Van der Merwe 24' c Penalty try 46'; Blevins 71' m Con: Braid (2/2) 19', 25'; Pen: Braid (1/1) 22'		Try: Silva 1' c Leivas 30' c Arata 40' c Dotti 51' c Capó Ortega 56' c Con: Berchesi (5/5) 2', 31', 40', 52', 57'; Pen: Berchesi (1/5) 75'

BC Place, Vancouver
Attendance: 16,132
Referee: Andrew Brace (Ireland)

FB	15	Taylor Paris
RW	14	Jeff Hassler	(substituted off) 20'	(substituted in) 28'
OC	13	Ben LeSage
IC	12	Nick Blevins
LW	11	D. T. H. van der Merwe
FH	10	Connor Braid	(substituted off) 32'
SH	9	Phil Mack (c)	(substituted off) 72'
N8	8	Tyler Ardron
OF	7	Matt Heaton	(substituted off) 75'
BF	6	Evan Olmstead
RL	5	Josh Larsen	(substituted off) 63'
LL	4	Brett Beukeboom
TP	3	Jake Ilnicki
HK	2	Ray Barkwill	(substituted off) 52'
LP	1	Hubert Buydens	(substituted off) 52'
Replacements:
HK	16	Benoît Piffero	(substituted in) 52'
PR	17	Djustice Sears-Duru	(substituted in) 52'
PR	18	Cole Keith
N8	19	Admir Cejvanovic	(substituted in) 75'
FL	20	Lucas Rumball	(substituted in) 63'
SH	21	Gordon McRorie	(substituted in) 72'
FH	22	Pat Parfrey	(substituted in) 32'
FB	23	Brock Staller	(substituted in) 20'	(substituted off) 28'
Coach:
(Wales) Kingsley Jones

FB	15	Rodrigo Silva
RW	14	Leandro Leivas		(substituted off) 61'
OC	13	Juan Manuel Cat		(substituted off) 64'
IC	12	Andrés Vilaseca
LW	11	Nicolás Freitas
FH	10	Felipe Berchesi
SH	9	Santiago Arata		(substituted off) 61'
N8	8	Alejandro Nieto
OF	7	Franco Lammana		(substituted off) 48'	(substituted in) 57'	(substituted off) 61'	(substituted in) 67'	(substituted off) 71'
BF	6	Juan Manuel Gaminara (c)					67' to 71'
RL	5	Rodrigo Capó Ortega		(substituted off) 57'	(substituted in) 61'	(substituted off) 63'
LL	4	Ignacio Dotti
TP	3	Mario Sagario		(substituted off) 64'
HK	2	Germán Kessler	(yellow card) 46' to 56'			(substituted off) 66'
LP	1	Mateo Sanguinetti		(substituted in) 66'
Replacements:
HK	16	Carlos Pombo		(substituted in) 48'	(substituted off) 57'	(substituted in) 66'
PR	17	Matías Benítez		(substituted in) 66'
PR	18	Juan Echeverría		(substituted in) 64'
LK	19	Manuel Leindekar		(substituted in) 57'	(substituted off) 61'	(substituted in) 63'
FL	20	Rodolfo Garese				(substituted in) 61'
SH	21	Agustín Ormaechea		(substituted in) 61'
FB	22	Gastón Mieres		(substituted in) 61'
CE	23	Joaquín Prada		(substituted in) 64'
Coach:
(Argentina) Esteban Meneses

Man of the Match:
Nicolás Freitas (Uruguay)

Touch judges:
Kurt Weaver (United States)
Derek Summers (United States)
Television match official:
Marc Nelson (United States)

Notes:

- This is the first time that Uruguay has beaten Canada in Canada.
- This was the first leg of the 2019 Rugby World Cup Americas 2 qualification

=== Week 2 ===
3 February 2018
15:00 CLST (UTC-03)

(1 BP) Chile	12–16	Brazil
Try: Penalty Try 7'; Garafulic 63' c Con: Ianiszewski (1/1) 64'	Report	Try: Vettorato 31' c Con: Reeves (1/1) 32'; Pen: Reeves (3/5) 16', 45', 61'

Estadio Municipal de La Pintana, Santiago
Attendance: 1,500
Referee: Pablo de Luca (Argentina)

FB	15	Tomás Ianiszewski
RW	14	Mauricio Urrutia	(substituted off) 55'
OC	13	José Ignacio Larenas (c)	(substituted off) 39'
IC	12	Francisco de la Fuente
LW	11	Ítalo Zunino
FH	10	Santiago Videla
SH	9	Juan Pablo Perrotta	(substituted off) 54'
N8	8	Benjamín Soto	(substituted off) 26' (substituted in) 36'
OF	7	Alfonso Escobar	(substituted off) 57'
BF	6	Javier Richard
RL	5	Mario Mayol
LL	4	Nikola Bursic			(substituted off) 65'
TP	3	José Tomás Munita	(substituted off) 76'
HK	2	Tomás Dussaillant
LP	1	Vittorio Lastra	(substituted off) 60'
Replacements:
HK	16	Ignacio Guajardo
PR	17	Sebastián Otero	(substituted in) 60'
PR	18	Marco Díaz	(substituted in) 76'
N8	19	Manuel Dagnino	(substituted in) 26'	(substituted off) 36'	(substituted in) 65'
FL	20	Nicolás Garafulic	(substituted in) 57'
SH	21	Beltrán Vergara	(substituted in) 54'
FH	22	Benjamín Pizarro	(substituted in) 55'
CE	23	Lucca Avelli	(substituted in) 39'
Coach:
(New Zealand) Mark Cross

FB	15	Lucas Tranquez	(substituted off) 64'
RW	14	Lucas Muller	(substituted off) 56'
OC	13	Felipe Sancery
IC	12	Moisés Duque
LW	11	Jacobus de Wet van Niekerk	(substituted off) 66'
FH	10	Josh Reeves
SH	9	Laurent Bourda-Couhet
N8	8	André Arruda
OF	7	Cléber Dias
BF	6	Arthur Bergo
RL	5	Lucas Piero	(substituted off) 60'
LL	4	Gabriel Paganini
TP	3	Jardel Vettorato	(substituted off) 50'
HK	2	Yan Rosetti (c)
LP	1	Lucas Abud	(substituted off) 64'
Replacements:
FL	16	Angelo Marcucci
PR	17	Michel Gomes	(substituted in) 64'
HK	18	Wilton Rebolo	(substituted in) 50'
LK	19	Diego López
FL	20	Matheus Daniel	(substituted in) 60'
SH	21	Will Broderick	(substituted in) 66'
WG	22	Robert Tenório	(substituted in) 56'
WG	23	Ariel Rodrigues	(substituted in) 64'
Coach:
(Argentina) Rodolfo Ambrosio

Touch judges:
FRC Appt. (Chile)
FRC Appt. (Chile)
Television match official:
FRC Appt. (Chile)

Notes:

- This is the first time that Brazil has beaten Chile in Chile.
- Lucca Avelli, Alfonso Escobar and Nicolás Garafulic (all Chile) made their international debuts.

3 February 2018
17:00 PST (UTC-08)

United States	17–10	Argentina XV (1 BP)
Try: Lamborn 57' m Pen: Magie (2/4) 16', 42'; Hooley (2/2) 70', 77'	Report	Try: Montagner 38' c Con: González (1/1) 39'; Pen: González (1/2) 23'

StubHub Center, Carson, California
Attendance: 6,500
Referee: Chris Assmus (Canada)

FB	15	Mike Te'o
RW	14	Blaine Scully (c)
OC	13	Marcel Brache		(substituted off) 8'
IC	12	Bryce Campbell
LW	11	Ryan Matyas		(substituted off) 21'	(substituted in) 32'
FH	10	Will Magie		(substituted off) 68'
SH	9	Nate Augspurger		(substituted off) 55'
N8	8	Cam Dolan	(yellow card) 37' to 47'
OF	7	Tony Lamborn		(substituted off) 72'
BF	6	Hanco Germishuys
RL	5	Nick Civetta
LL	4	Nate Brakeley		(substituted off) 68'
TP	3	Dino Waldren		(substituted off) 80'
HK	2	Joe Taufete'e		(substituted off) 65'
LP	1	Titi Lamositele	(yellow card) 19' to 29'			(substituted off) 80'
Replacements:
HK	16	James Hilterbrand		(substituted in) 65'
PR	17	Huluholo Moungaloa		(substituted in) 21'	(substituted off) 32'	(substituted in) 80'
PR	18	Angus MacLellan		(substituted in) 80'
LK	19	Ben Landry		(substituted in) 68'
FL	20	Andrew Durutalo		(substituted in) 72'
SH	21	Shaun Davies		(substituted in) 55'
FH	22	Will Hooley		(substituted in) 68'
CE	23	Dylan Audsley		(substituted in) 8'
Coach:
(South Africa) Gary Gold

FB	15	Gastón Arias
RW	14	Germán Schulz		(substituted off) 71'
OC	13	Juan Cruz Mallía
IC	12	Juan Cappiello	(yellow card) 8' to 18'
LW	11	Rodrigo Etchart
FH	10	Juan Cruz González		(substituted off) 55'
SH	9	Luca Magnasco
N8	8	Santiago Montagner				(substituted off) 68'
OF	7	Lautaro Bavaro (c)		(substituted off) 8'	(substituted in) 16'
BF	6	Rodrigo Bruni
RL	5	Ignacio Larrague
LL	4	Jerónimo Ureta		(substituted off) 65'
TP	3	Benjamín Espinal		(substituted off) 65'
HK	2	Gaspar Baldunciel		(substituted off) 75'
LP	1	Francisco Ferronato		(substituted off) 65'
Replacements:
HK	16	Diego Fortuny		(substituted in) 75'
PR	17	Javier Díaz		(substituted in) 65'
PR	18	Santiago Medrano		(substituted in) 65'
N8	19	Santiago Portillo		(substituted in) 68'
FL	20	Francisco Gorrissen		(substituted in) 8'	(substituted off) 16'	(substituted in) 68'
SH	21	Facundo Nogueira
FH	22	Tomás Granella		(substituted in) 55'
WG	23	Tomás Malanos		(substituted in) 71'
Coach:
(Argentina) Felipe Contepomi

Touch judges:
Mike O'Brien (United States)
Lee Bryant (United States)
Television match official:
USA Appt. (United States)

=== Week 3 ===
9 February 2018
20:30 BRST (UTC-02)

Brazil	18–27	Uruguay
Try: De Wet van Niekerk 10' c Sancery 35' m Con: Reeves (1/2) 11'; Pen: Reeves (2/2) 23', 27'	Report	Try: Kessler 46'c Magno 62' c Inciarte 70' c Con: Albanell (3/3) 47', 65', 70'; Pen: Albanell (2/2) 30', 81'

Pacaembu Stadium, São Paulo
Attendance: 3,500
Referee: Federico Anselmi (Argentina)

FB	15	Lucas Tranquez
RW	14	Robert Tenório		(substituted off) 62'
OC	13	Felipe Sancery
IC	12	Moisés Duque
LW	11	Jacobus de Wet van Niekerk
FH	10	Josh Reeves
SH	9	Laurent Bourda-Couhet
N8	8	André Arruda
OF	7	Cléber Dias
BF	6	Arthur Bergo		(substituted off) 43' (substituted in) 49'
RL	5	Lucas Piero		(substituted off) 53'
LL	4	Gabriel Paganini
TP	3	Jardel Vettorato	(yellow card) 38' to 48'	(substituted off) 49'
HK	2	Yan Rosetti (c)
LP	1	Lucas Abud		(substituted off) 53'
Replacements:
HK	16	Endy Willian
PR	17	Michel Gomes		(substituted in) 53'
PR	18	Wilton Rebolo		(substituted in) 43'
FL	19	Michael Moraes
FL	20	Matheus Daniel		(substituted in) 53' (substituted off) 76'
SH	21	Will Broderick
WG	22	Lucas Muller
WG	23	Ariel Rodrigues		(substituted in) 62'
Coach:
(Argentina) Rodolfo Ambrosio

FB	15	Rodrigo Silva
RW	14	Joaquín Prada
OC	13	Juan Manuel Cat
IC	12	Agustín Della Corte
LW	11	Gastón Mieres
FH	10	Andrés de León	(substituted off) 68'
SH	9	Germán Albanell
N8	8	Alejandro Nieto	(substituted off) 53'
OF	7	Rodolfo Garese	(substituted off) 57'
BF	6	Juan Manuel Gaminara (c)
RL	5	Diego Magno	(substituted off) 68'
LL	4	Ignacio Dotti
TP	3	Mario Sagario	(substituted off) 53'
HK	2	Germán Kessler	(substituted off) 53'
LP	1	Mateo Sanguinetti	(substituted off) 68'
Replacements:
PR	16	Matías Benítez	(substituted in) 68'
HK	17	Carlos Pombo	(substituted in) 53'
PR	18	Juan Echeverría	(substituted in) 53'
LK	19	Diego Ayala	(substituted in) 68'
N8	20	Manuel Diana	(substituted in) 53'
FL	21	Gonzalo Soto	(substituted in) 57'
WG	22	Tomás Inciarte	(substituted in) 68'
FH	23	Manuel Blengio
Coach:
(Argentina) Esteban Meneses

Touch judges:
Murilo Bragotto (Brazil)
Cauã Ricardo (Brazil)
Television match official:
Xavier Vouga (Brazil)

Notes:

- Andrés de León and Tomás Inciarte (both Uruguay) made their international debuts.
- Juan Manuel Gaminara (Uruguay) earned his 50th test cap.

10 February 2018
17:30 ART (UTC-03)

(1 BP) Argentina XV	57–12	Chile
Try: Portillo 15' c Penalty try 34'; Videla 35' c Resino 46' m Zapata 51' c Ferronato 56' c Granella 64' c Sbrocco 71' c Con: González (4/5) 15', 36', 52', 57'; Granella (2/2) 65', 72'; Pen: González (1/1) 11'	Report	Try: Ianiszewski 28' m Zunino 40' c Con: Ianiszewski (1/2) 41'

Estadio Agustín Pichot, Ushuaia
Attendance: 900
Referee: Joaquín Montes (Uruguay)

FB	15	Tomás Videla
RW	14	Tomás Malanos	(substituted off) 63'
OC	13	Santiago Resino
IC	12	Lucas Mensa
LW	11	Julián Dominguez
FH	10	Juan Cruz González	(substituted off) 56'
SH	9	Facundo Nogueira	(substituted off) 47'
N8	8	Santiago Portillo	(substituted off) 47'
OF	7	Tomás de la Vega (c)
BF	6	Mariano Romanini	(substituted off) 62'
RL	5	Diego Galetto
LL	4	Jerónimo Ureta	(substituted off) 47'
TP	3	Lucas Favre
HK	2	Diego Fortuny	(substituted off) 56'
LP	1	Axel Zapata	(substituted off) 56'
Replacements:
HK	16	Gaspar Baldunciel	(substituted in) 62'
PR	17	Francisco Ferronato	(substituted in) 56'
PR	18	Santiago Medrano	(substituted in) 56'
LK	19	Franco Molina	(substituted in) 47'
FL	20	Nicolás Sbrocco	(substituted in) 47'
SH	21	Gregorio del Prete	(substituted in) 47'
FH	22	Tomás Granella	(substituted in) 56'
WG	23	Germán Schulz	(substituted in) 63'
Coach:
(Argentina) Felipe Contepomi

FB	15	Tomás Ianiszewski
RW	14	Matías Balbontín		(substituted off) 56'
OC	13	Lucca Avelli	(yellow card) 62' to 72'
IC	12	Francisco de la Fuente
LW	11	Ítalo Zunino
FH	10	Benjamín Pizarro		(substituted off) 60'
SH	9	Beltrán Vergara		(substituted off) 50'
N8	8	Benjamín Soto	(yellow card) 54' to 64'
OF	7	Alfonso Escobar		(substituted off) 50'
BF	6	Javier Richard (c)	(yellow card) 33' to 43'
RL	5	Mario Mayol		(substituted off) 65'
LL	4	Manuel Dagnino
TP	3	Marco Díaz		(substituted off) 45'
HK	2	Tomás Dussaillant		(substituted off) 61'
LP	1	Vittorio Lastra		(substituted off) 56'
Replacements:
HK	16	Ignacio Guajardo		(substituted in) 61'
PR	17	Sebastián Otero		(substituted in) 45'
PR	18	Claudio Iturra		(substituted in) 56'
FL	19	Thomas Orchard		(substituted in) 65'
FL	20	Nicolás Garafulic		(substituted in) 50'
SH	21	Domingo Saavedra		(substituted in) 50'
FH	22	José Tomás Baraona		(substituted in) 60'
CE	23	Diego Ramírez		(substituted in) 56'
Coach:
(New Zealand) Mark Cross

Touch judges:
Damián Schneider (Argentina)
Juan Pablo Federico (Argentina)
Television match official:
UAR Appt. (Argentina)

10 February 2018
15:00 PST (UTC-08)

(1 BP) United States	29–10	Canada
Try: Augspurger 7' c Matyas (2) 17' c, 72' m Germishuys 52' c Con: Magie (3/3) 8', 18', 53'; Pen: Hooley (1/3) 64'	Report	Try: Parfrey 22' c Con: Staller (1/1) 23'; Pen: Staller (1/2) 43'

Papa Murphy's Park, Sacramento, California
Attendance: 2,500
Referee: Francisco González (Uruguay)

FB	15	Mike Te'o
RW	14	Blaine Scully (c)
OC	13	Dylan Audsley
IC	12	Bryce Campbell
LW	11	Ryan Matyas		(substituted off) 76'
FH	10	Will Magie		(substituted off) 55'
SH	9	Nate Augspurger		(substituted off) 55'
N8	8	Cam Dolan	(yellow card) 63' to 73'
OF	7	Tony Lamborn
BF	6	Hanco Germishuys		(substituted off) 53'
RL	5	Nick Civetta
LL	4	Nate Brakeley		(substituted off) 48'
TP	3	Dino Waldren		(substituted off) 75'
HK	2	Joe Taufete'e		(substituted off) 59'
LP	1	Titi Lamositele		(substituted off) 75'
Replacements:
HK	16	James Hilterbrand		(substituted in) 59'
PR	17	Huluholo Moungaloa		(substituted in) 75'
PR	18	Angus MacLellan		(substituted in) 75'
LK	19	Ben Landry		(substituted in) 48'
FL	20	Andrew Durutalo		(substituted in) 53'
SH	21	Shaun Davies		(substituted in) 55'
FH	22	Will Hooley		(substituted in) 55'
WG	23	Josh Whippy		(substituted in) 76'
Coach:
(South Africa) Gary Gold

FB	15	Pat Parfrey
RW	14	Brock Staller
OC	13	Giuseppe du Toit	(substituted off) 72'
IC	12	Nick Blevins
LW	11	D. T. H. van der Merwe
FH	10	Shane O'Leary	(substituted off) 72'
SH	9	Phil Mack (c)	(substituted off) 72'
N8	8	Luke Campbell
OF	7	Matt Heaton	(substituted off) 72'
BF	6	Lucas Rumball
RL	5	Kyle Baillie	(substituted off) 61'
LL	4	Josh Larsen
TP	3	Jake Ilnicki	(substituted off) 64'
HK	2	Ray Barkwill
LP	1	Djustice Sears-Duru	(substituted off) 64'
Replacements:
HK	16	Martial Lagain
PR	17	Anthony Luca	(substituted in) 64'
PR	18	Cole Keith	(substituted in) 64'
LK	19	Conor Keys	(substituted in) 61'
FL	20	Dustin Dobravsky	(substituted in) 72'
SH	21	Gordon McRorie	(substituted in) 72'
FH	22	Robbie Povey	(substituted in) 72'
WG	23	Cole Davis	(substituted in) 72'
Coach:
(Wales) Kingsley Jones

Touch judges:
Derek Summers (United States)
Phil Akroyd (United States)
Television match official:
Marc Nelson (United States)

Notes:

- Josh Whippy (United States) and Luke Campbell, Cole Davis and Dustin Dobravsky (all Canada) made their international debuts.
- D. T. H. van der Merwe (Canada) earned his 50th test cap.

=== Week 4 ===
17 February 2018
15:00 PST (UTC-08)

(1 BP) United States	45–13	Chile
Try: Augspurger 3' m Audsley (2) 20' m, 43' c Campbell 45' c Te'o 51' c Al-Jiboori 63' c Lasike 78' c Con: Magie (4/6) 43', 45', 52', 64'; Cima (1/1) 79'	Report	Try: Dussaillant 48' m Zunino 73'm Pen: Ianiszewski (1/2) 27'

Titan Stadium, Fullerton, California
Attendance: 2,000
Referee: Chris Assmus (Canada)

FB	15	Mike Te'o
RW	14	Josh Whippy	(substituted off) 77'
OC	13	Dylan Audsley
IC	12	Bryce Campbell
LW	11	Ryan Matyas
FH	10	Will Magie	(substituted off) 67'
SH	9	Nate Augspurger (c)	(substituted off) 65'
N8	8	Cam Dolan
OF	7	Tony Lamborn	(substituted off) 62'
BF	6	Psalm Wooching
RL	5	Ben Landry	(substituted off) 57'
LL	4	Nate Brakeley
TP	3	Dino Waldren	(substituted off) 55'
HK	2	James Hilterbrand	(substituted off) 65'
LP	1	Huluholo Moungaloa	(substituted off) 70'
Replacements:
HK	16	Dylan Fawsitt	(substituted in) 65'
PR	17	Tony Purpura	(substituted in) 70'
PR	18	Angus MacLellan	(substituted in) 55'
LK	19	Brendan Daly	(substituted in) 57'
FL	20	Malon Al-Jiboori	(substituted in) 62'
SH	21	Ruben de Haas	(substituted in) 65'
FH	22	Ben Cima	(substituted in) 67'
CE	23	Paul Lasike	(substituted in) 77'
Coach:
(South Africa) Gary Gold

FB	15	Tomás Ianiszewski
RW	14	Martín Raddatz
OC	13	Javier Lavanderos
IC	12	Francisco de la Fuente	(substituted off) 46'
LW	11	Ítalo Zunino
FH	10	José Tomás Baraona	(substituted off) 65'
SH	9	Beltrán Vergara	(substituted off) 65'
N8	8	Benjamín Soto
OF	7	Alfonso Escobar	(substituted off) 58'
BF	6	Javier Richard (c)
RL	5	Mario Mayol	(substituted off) 70'
LL	4	Nikola Bursic
TP	3	Claudio Iturra	(substituted off) 65'
HK	2	Tomás Dussaillant	(substituted off) 70'
LP	1	Vittorio Lastra	(substituted off) 68'
Replacements:
HK	16	Rodrigo Moya	(substituted in) 70'
PR	17	Basilio Díaz	(substituted in) 65'
PR	18	Marco Díaz	(substituted in) 68'
FL	19	Thomas Orchard	(substituted in) 70'
FL	20	Iñaki de Urruticoechea	(substituted in) 58'
SH	21	Domingo Saavedra	(substituted in) 65'
FB	22	José Tomás Maturana	(substituted in) 65'
CE	23	Diego Ramírez	(substituted in) 46'
Coach:
(New Zealand) Mark Cross

Touch judges:
USAR Appt (United States)
USAR Appt (United States)
Television match official:
USAR Appt (United States)

Notes:

- Malon Al-Jiboori, Brendan Daly, Ruben de Haas, Dylan Fawsitt, Paul Lasike and Psalm Wooching (all United States) and Iñaki de Urruticoechea, Basilio Díaz, José Tomás Maturana and Martín Raddatz (all Chile) made their international debuts.

17 February 2018
20:00 UYT (UTC-03)

Uruguay	17–34	Argentina XV (1 BP)
Try: Cat (2) 7' c, 14' m Freitas 47' m Con: Albanell (1/3) 8'	Report	Try: González 23' m Ferronato 32' c Schulz 51' m Etchart 62' c Mensa 72' c Con: González (1/2) 33'; Mensa (2/3) 63', 73'; Pen: González (1/2) 36'

Estadio Domingo Burgueño, Maldonado
Attendance: 4,000
Referee: Henrique Platais (Brazil)

FB	15	Rodrigo Silva		(substituted off) 74'
RW	14	Leandro Leivas
OC	13	Juan Manuel Cat		(substituted off) 61'
IC	12	Andrés Vilaseca	(yellow card) 41' to 51'
LW	11	Nicolás Freitas		(substituted off) 74'
FH	10	Germán Albanell
SH	9	Tomás Inciarte
N8	8	Alejandro Nieto (c)		50' to 58'
OF	7	Manuel Diana		(substituted off) 20'	(substituted in) 30'	(substituted off) 47'	(substituted off) 63'
BF	6	Rodolfo Garese		(substituted off) 74'
RL	5	Diego Magno
LL	4	Ignacio Dotti
TP	3	Juan Echeverría		(substituted off) 47'	(substituted in) 77'
HK	2	Carlos Pombo			(substituted off) 77'
LP	1	Mateo Sanguinetti	(yellow card) 30' to 40'	(substituted off) 8'	(substituted in) 19'			(substituted off) 61'
Replacements:
PR	16	Matías Benítez		(substituted in) 8'	(substituted off) 19'	(substituted in) 20'	(substituted off) 30'	(substituted in) 61'
HK	17	Diego de Pazos
PR	18	Mario Sagario		(substituted in) 47'
N8	19	Juan Diego Ormaechea		(substituted in) 50'	(substituted off) 58'	(substituted in) 63'
FL	21	Juan Manuel Gaminara				(substituted in) 48'
FL	20	Gonzalo Soto		(substituted in) 74'
CE	22	Joaquín Prada		(substituted in) 61'
FH	23	Andrés de León		(substituted in) 74'
Coach:
(Argentina) Esteban Meneses

FB	15	Juan Cruz Mallía
RW	14	Germán Schulz
OC	13	Santiago Álvarez		(substituted off) 74'
IC	12	Juan Cappiello
LW	11	Rodrigo Etchart
FH	10	Juan Cruz González		(substituted off) 46'
SH	9	Luca Magnasco		(substituted off) 40'
N8	8	Rodrigo Bruni		(substituted off) 50'
OF	7	Lautaro Bavaro (c)
BF	6	Francisco Gorrissen
RL	5	Ignacio Larrague
LL	4	Diego Galetto	(yellow card) 41' to 51'	(substituted off) 49'
TP	3	Benjamín Espinal		(substituted off) 24'
HK	2	Diego Fortuny		(substituted off) 60'
LP	1	Francisco Ferronato		(substituted off) 57'
Replacements:
HK	16	Gaspar Baldunciel		(substituted in) 60'
PR	17	Axel Zapata		(substituted in) 57'
PR	18	Santiago Medrano		(substituted in) 24'
N8	19	Santiago Portillo		(substituted in) 49'
FL	20	Santiago Montagner		(substituted in) 50'
SH	21	Gregorio del Prete		(substituted in) 40'
CE	22	Lucas Mensa		(substituted in) 46'
CE	23	Tomás Videla		(substituted in) 74'
Coach:
(Argentina) Felipe Contepomi

Touch judges:
Rodrigo Goyret (Uruguay)
Gonzalo Ventoso (Uruguay)
Television match official:
URU Appt (Uruguay)

17 February 2018
18:30 PST (UTC-08)

(1 BP) Canada	45–5	Brazil
Try: Campbell 2' c Davis 9' c Sears-Duru 29' c van der Merwe 39' m Barkwill 46' m Fraser 60' c du Toit 76' c Con: O'Leary (5/7) 4', 9', 30', 61', 77'	Report	Try: de Wet van Niekerk 80' m

Westhills Stadium, Langford, British Columbia
Attendance: 1,500
Referee: Kurt Weaver (United States

FB	15	Pat Parfrey
RW	14	Cole Davis
OC	13	Doug Fraser
IC	12	Nick Blevins	(substituted off) 62'
LW	11	D. T. H. van der Merwe	(substituted off) 18'	(substituted in) 28'
FH	10	Shane O'Leary
SH	9	Phil Mack (c)	(substituted off) 62'
N8	8	Luke Campbell
OF	7	Lucas Rumball
BF	6	Dustin Dobravsky	(substituted off) 75'
RL	5	Kyle Baillie	(substituted off) 71'
LL	4	Josh Larsen
TP	3	Jake Ilnicki	(substituted off) 68'
HK	2	Ray Barkwill	(substituted off) 68'
LP	1	Djustice Sears-Duru	(substituted off) 68'
Replacements:
HK	16	Martial Lagain	(substituted in) 68'
PR	17	Anthony Luca	(substituted in) 68'
PR	18	Ryan Kotlewski	(substituted in) 68'
LK	19	Conor Keys	(substituted in) 71'
FL	20	Cameron Polson	(substituted in) 75'
SH	21	Andrew Ferguson	(substituted in) 62'
CE	22	Giuseppe du Toit	(substituted in) 62'
FB	23	Brock Staller	(substituted in) 18'	(substituted off) 28'
Coach:
(Wales) Kingsley Jones

FB	15	Lucas Tranquez
RW	14	Ariel Rodrigues
OC	13	Felipe Sancery
IC	12	Moisés Duque
LW	11	Lucas Muller	(yellow card) 39' to 49'	(substituted off) 49'
FH	10	Josh Reeves
SH	9	Laurent Bourda-Couhet		(substituted off) 62'
N8	8	André Arruda
OF	7	Cléber Dias
BF	6	Michael Moraes		(substituted off) 40'
RL	5	Diego López		(substituted off) 40'
LL	4	Gabriel Paganini	(red card) 56'
TP	3	Matheus Rocha		(substituted off) 62'
HK	2	Endy Willian		(substituted off) 40'
LP	1	Jonatas Paulo		(substituted off) 40'
Replacements:
HK	16	Wilton Rebolo		(substituted in) 62'
PR	17	Lucas Abud		(substituted in) 40'
PR	18	Caíque Silva		(substituted in) 40'
LK	19	Lucas Piero		(substituted in) 40'
FL	20	Arthur Bergo		(substituted in) 40'
SH	21	Will Broderick		(substituted in) 62'
FH	22	Leonardo Ceccarelli
CE	23	Jacobus de Wet van Niekerk		(substituted in) 49'
Coach:
(Argentina) Rodolfo Ambrosio

Touch judges:
Harry Mason (Canada)
Robin Kaluzniak (Canada)
Television match official:
RC Appt (Canada)

Notes:

- Doug Fraser, Martial Lagain and Cameron Polson (all Canada) and Michael Moraes (Brazil) made their international debuts.

=== Week 5 ===
24 February 2018
15:00 CLST (UTC-03)

Chile	15–67	Uruguay (1 BP)
Try: Bursic 40' m Balbontíns 45' c Con: Ianiszewski (1/2) 46'; Pen: Ianiszewski (1/2) 10'	Report	Try: Diana (3) 19' c, 52' c, 69' c Leivas 25' c Favaro (2) 31' c, 47' m de León 48' c Mieres 64' c Blengio 73' c Con: Albanell (4/5) 20', 26', 32', 53'; Favaro (1/1) 59' de León (3/3) 65', 70', 74'; Pen: Albanell (2/2) 14', 21'

Estadio Municipal de La Pintana, Santiago
Attendance: 1,200
Referee: Henrique Platais (Brazil)

FB	15	Tomás Ianiszewski
RW	14	Matías Balbontíns	(yellow card) 21' (red card) 56'
OC	13	Javier Lavanderos		(substituted off) 40'
IC	12	Francisco de la Fuente	(yellow card) 64' to 74'
LW	11	Ítalo Zunino
FH	10	José Tomás Baraona		(substituted off) 55'
SH	9	Domingo Saavedra		(substituted off) 55'
N8	8	Benjamín Soto		(substituted off) 55'
OF	7	Anton Petrowitsch
BF	6	Javier Richard (c)
RL	5	Mario Mayol		(substituted off) 51'
LL	4	Nikola Bursic
TP	3	Claudio Iturra		(substituted off) 51'
HK	2	Tomás Dussaillant		(substituted off) 58'
LP	1	Vittorio Lastra		(substituted off) 62'
Replacements:
HK	16	Rodrigo Moya		(substituted in) 58'
PR	17	Sebastián Otero		(substituted in) 62'
PR	18	Basilio Díaz		(substituted in) 51'
FL	19	Nicolás Garafulic		(substituted in) 51'
FL	20	Alfonso Escobar		(substituted in) 55'
SH	21	Beltrán Vergara		(substituted in) 55'
FH	22	Benjamín Pizarro		(substituted in) 55'
CE	23	Diego Ramírez		(substituted in) 40'
Coach:
(New Zealand) Mark Cross

FB	15	Rodrigo Silva	(substituted off) 40'
RW	14	Leandro Leivas
OC	13	Joaquín Prada
IC	12	Andrés Vilaseca (c)
LW	11	Federico Favaro	(substituted off) 60'
FH	10	Germán Albanell	(substituted off) 56'
SH	9	Tomás Inciarte
N8	8	Manuel Diana
OF	7	Juan Diego Ormaechea
BF	6	Rodolfo Garese
RL	5	Diego Ayala	(substituted off) 66'
LL	4	Ignacio Dotti	(substituted off) 40'
TP	3	Juan Echeverría	(substituted off) 60'
HK	2	Germán Kessler	(substituted off) 66'
LP	1	Mateo Sanguinetti	(substituted off) 46'
Replacements:
PR	16	Matías Benítez	(substituted in) 46'
HK	17	Carlos Arboleya	(substituted in) 66'
PR	18	Felipe Inciarte	(substituted in) 60'
FL	19	Juan Manuel Etcheverry	(substituted in) 40'
LK	20	Diego Magno	(substituted in) 40'
FH	21	Andrés de León	(substituted in) 56'
FB	22	Gastón Mieres	(substituted in) 40'
FH	23	Manuel Blengio	(substituted in) 60'
Coach:
(Argentina) Esteban Meneses

Touch judges:
FRC Appt. (Chile)
FRC Appt. (Chile)
Television match official:
FRC Appt. (Chile)

Notes:

- Juan Manuel Etcheverry (Uruguay) made his international debut.

24 February 2018
18:00 BRST (UTC-02)

Brazil	16–45	United States (1 BP)
Try: Duque 34'c Con: Reeves (1/1) 35'; Pen: Reeves (3/4) 8', 59', 63'	Report	Try: Te'o 4' m Moungaloa 11' c Campbell 19'c Germishuys (2) 28' c, 73' c Lamborn 67' c Lasike 71' m Con: Magie (3/4) 12', 20', 29'; Cima (2/3) 68', 74'

Estádio Martins Pereira, São José dos Campos
Attendance: 1,061
Referee: Francisco González (Uruguay)

FB	15	Lucas Tranquez		(substituted off) 75'
RW	14	Stefano Giantorno	(yellow card) 53' to 63'	(substituted off) 68'
OC	13	Felipe Sancery
IC	12	Moisés Duque
LW	11	Robert Tenório		(substituted off) 40'
FH	10	Josh Reeves
SH	9	Laurent Bourda-Couhet		(substituted off) 75'
N8	8	André Arruda
OF	7	Matheus Daniel
BF	6	Arthur Bergo
RL	5	Cléber Dias		(substituted off) 16'	(substituted in) 20'
LL	4	Lucas Piero		(substituted off) 27'
TP	3	Jardel Vettorato	(yellow card) 68' to 78'
HK	2	Yan Rosetti (c)		(substituted off) 77'
LP	1	Michel Gomes		(substituted off) 40'
Replacements:
HK	16	Angelo Marcucci		(substituted in) 77'
PR	17	Lucas Abud		(substituted in) 40'
PR	18	Matheus Rocha		(substituted in) 68'
LK	19	Diego López	(yellow card) 66' to 76'	(substituted in) 27'	(substituted off) 77'
FL	20	Michael Moraes			(substituted in) 77'
SH	21	Daniel Lima		(substituted in) 75'
WG	22	Ariel Rodrigues		(substituted in) 40'
CE	23	Jacobus de Wet van Niekerk		(substituted in) 75'
Coach:
(Argentina) Rodolfo Ambrosio

FB	15	Mike Te'o
RW	14	Nate Augspurger (c)
OC	13	Dylan Audsley		(substituted off) 53'
IC	12	Bryce Campbell
LW	11	Josh Whippy
FH	10	Will Magie		(substituted off) 61'
SH	9	Shaun Davies		(substituted off) 75'
N8	8	Cam Dolan		(substituted off) 50'
OF	7	Hanco Germishuys
BF	6	Psalm Wooching
RL	5	Nick Civetta	(yellow card) 58' to 68'
LL	4	Ben Landry		(substituted off) 69'
TP	3	Chris Baumann		(substituted off) 75'
HK	2	Dylan Fawsitt		(substituted off) 59'
LP	1	Huluholo Moungaloa		(substituted off) 69'
Replacements:
HK	16	Peter Malcolm		(substituted in) 59'
PR	17	Tony Purpura		(substituted in) 69'
PR	18	Angus MacLellan		(substituted in) 75'
LK	19	Matthew Jensen		(substituted in) 69'
FL	20	Tony Lamborn		(substituted in) 50'
SH	21	Ruben de Haas		(substituted in) 75'
FH	22	Ben Cima		(substituted in) 61'
CE	23	Paul Lasike		(substituted in) 53'
Coach:
(South Africa) Gary Gold

Touch judges:
CBRU Appt (Brazil)
CBRU Appt (Brazil)
Television match official:
CBRU Appt (Brazil)

Notes:

- Daniel Lima and Angelo Marcucci (both Brazil) made their international debuts.

24 February 2018
20:00 ART (UTC-03)

(1 BP) Argentina XV	40–15	Canada
Try: Mensa 14' m Álvarez 24' c Resino (2) 27' c, 45' c Montagner 48' c Arias 76' c Con: Mallía (4/5) 25', 28', 46', 49'; González (1/1) 77'		Try: Barkwill 31'm Mack 56' c Con: Staller (1/2) 57'; Pen: Staller (1/2) 11'

Estadio 23 de Agosto, Jujuy
Attendance: 7,500
Referee: Joaquín Montes (Uruguay)

FB	15	Juan Cruz Mallía
RW	14	Santiago Álvarez	(substituted off) 61'
OC	13	Santiago Resino
IC	12	Juan Cappiello
LW	11	Rodrigo Etchart
FH	10	Lucas Mensa	(substituted off) 61'
SH	9	Felipe Ezcurra	(substituted off) 61'
N8	8	Santiago Montagner
OF	7	Tomás de la Vega (c)	(substituted off) 56'
BF	6	Mariano Romanini	(substituted off) 61'
RL	5	Ignacio Larrague
LL	4	Santiago Portillo
TP	3	Santiago Medrano	(substituted off) 61'
HK	2	Gaspar Baldunciel	(substituted off) 50'
LP	1	Franco Brarda	(substituted off) 49'
Replacements:
HK	16	Diego Fortuny	(substituted in) 50'
PR	17	Francisco Ferronato	(substituted in) 49'
PR	18	Lucas Favre	(substituted in) 61'
LK	19	Jerónimo Ureta	(substituted in) 56'
FL	20	Nicolás Sbrocco	(substituted in) 61'
SH	21	Gregorio del Prete	(substituted in) 61'
FH	22	Juan Cruz González	(substituted in) 61'
FB	23	Gastón Arias	(substituted in) 61'
Coach:
(Argentina) Felipe Contepomi

FB	15	Pat Parfrey
RW	14	Cole Davis
OC	13	Doug Fraser
IC	12	Nick Blevins	(substituted off) 78'
LW	11	Brock Staller
FH	10	Robbie Povey	(substituted off) 49'
SH	9	Phil Mack (c)	(substituted off) 78'
N8	8	Dustin Dobravsky	(substituted off) 66'
OF	7	Lucas Rumball
BF	6	Kyle Baillie	(substituted off) 61'
RL	5	Conor Keys
LL	4	Josh Larsen
TP	3	Jake Ilnicki	(substituted off) 66'
HK	2	Ray Barkwill	(substituted off) 78'
LP	1	Djustice Sears-Duru	(substituted off) 70'
Replacements:
HK	16	Martial Lagain	(substituted in) 66'
PR	17	Anthony Luca	(substituted in) 70'
PR	18	Ryan Kotlewski	(substituted in) 66'
LK	19	Noah Barker	(substituted in) 78'
FL	20	Cameron Polson	(substituted in) 61'
SH	21	Andrew Ferguson	(substituted in) 78'
CE	22	Giuseppe du Toit	(substituted in) 78'
WG	23	Kainoa Lloyd	(substituted in) 49'
Coach:
(Wales) Kingsley Jones

Touch judges:
UAR Appt (Argentina)
UAR Appt (Argentina)
Television match official:
UAR Appt (Argentina)

=== Week 6 ===
3 March 2018
16:00 CLST (UTC-03)

Chile	17–33	Canada (1 BP)
Try: Urrutia 71' c Escobar 75' c Con: Ianiszewski (2/2) 72', 76'; Pen: Ianiszewski (1/1) 13'	Report	Try: Lloyd 9' m Rumball 25' c Baillie 39' c Davis 67' m Con: McRorie (2/4) 26', 40'; Pen: McRorie (3/3) 2', 44', 77'

Estadio Municipal de La Pintana, Santiago
Attendance: 1,000
Referee: Pablo de Luca (Argentina)

FB	15	Tomás Ianiszewski
RW	14	Lucca Avelli
OC	13	José Ignacio Larenas (c)
IC	12	Francisco de la Fuente
LW	11	Ítalo Zunino	(substituted off) 69'
FH	10	Benjamín Pizarro	(substituted off) 59'
SH	9	Juan Pablo Perotta	(substituted off) 59'
N8	8	Manuel Dagnino			(substituted off) 47'
OF	7	Anton Petrowitsch
BF	6	Javier Richard
RL	5	Mario Mayol	34' to 40'
LL	4	Nikola Bursic	(substituted off) 59'
TP	3	José Tomás Munita	(substituted off) 63'
HK	2	Tomás Dussaillant	(substituted off) 69'
LP	1	Vittoria Lastra	(substituted off) 70'
Replacements:
HK	16	Rodrigo Moya	(substituted in) 69'
PR	17	Sebastián Otero	(substituted in) 63'
PR	18	Basilio Díaz	(substituted in) 70'
N8	19	Benjamín Soto	(substituted in) 34'	(substituted off) 40'	(substituted in) 47'
FL	20	Alfonso Escobar	(substituted in) 59'
SH	21	Beltrán Vergara	(substituted in) 59'
FB	22	José Tomás Maturana	(substituted in) 59'
WG	23	Mauricio Urrutia	(substituted in) 69'
Coach:
(New Zealand) Mark Cross

FB	15	Josh Thiel
RW	14	Cole Davis
OC	13	Doug Fraser		(substituted off) 78'
IC	12	Nick Blevins	(yellow card) 44' to 54'	(substituted off) 55'
LW	11	Kainoa Lloyd
FH	10	Gordon McRorie
SH	9	Phil Mack (c)		(substituted off) 63'
N8	8	Luke Campbell	(yellow card) 60' to 70'
OF	7	Lucas Rumball
BF	6	Dustin Dobravsky		(substituted off) 72'
RL	5	Kyle Baillie		(substituted off) 69'
LL	4	Josh Larsen
TP	3	Jake Ilnicki		(substituted off) 63'
HK	2	Ray Barkwill		(substituted off) 72'
LP	1	Djustice Sears-Duru		(substituted off) 63'
Replacements:
HK	16	Martial Lagain		(substituted in) 72'
PR	17	Noah Barker		(substituted in) 63'
PR	18	Cole Keith		(substituted in) 63'
LK	19	Conor Keys		(substituted in) 69'
FL	20	Cameron Polson		(substituted in) 72'
SH	21	Andrew Ferguson		(substituted in) 63'
FH	22	Pat Parfrey		(substituted in) 78'
CE	23	Giuseppe du Toit		(substituted in) 55'
Coach:
(Wales) Kingsley Jones

Touch judges:
FRC Appt. (Chile)
FRC Appt. (Chile)
Television match official:
FRC Appt. (Chile)

Notes:

- Noah Barker and Josh Thiel (both Canada) made their international debuts.

3 March 2018
15:30 UYT (UTC-03)

Uruguay	19–61	United States (1 BP)
Try: Arata 44' c Cat 51' c Mieres 70' m Con: Albanell (2/3) 45', 52'	Report	Try: Lamborn 5' c Te'o (2) 7' c, 42' c Fawsitt 22' c Penalty try 26'; Augspurger 29' c Germishuys 37' m Whippy 55' c Wooching 74' c Con: Magie (6/7) 6', 8', 23', 30', 43', 56'; Cima (1/1) 75'

Estadio Charrúa, Montevideo
Attendance: 2,500
Referee: Federico Anselmi (Argentina)

FB	15	Rodrigo Silva
RW	14	Leandro Leivas
OC	13	Juan Manuel Cat
IC	12	Andrés Vilaseca		(substituted off) 62'
LW	11	Nicolás Freitas		(substituted off) 52'
FH	10	Germán Albanell
SH	9	Santiago Arata	(yellow card) 26' to 36'	(substituted off) 60'
N8	8	Manuel Diana
OF	7	Juan Diego Ormaechea		(substituted off) 75'
BF	6	Juan Manuel Gaminara (c)
RL	5	Rodolfo Garese		(substituted off) 40'
LL	4	Ignacio Dotti
TP	3	Juan Echeverría		(substituted off) 66'
HK	2	Germán Kessler		(substituted off) 62'
LP	1	Mateo Sanguinetti		(substituted off) 60'
Replacements:
PR	16	Matías Benítez		(substituted in) 60'
HK	17	Carlos Pombo	(yellow card) 64' to 74'	(substituted in) 62'
PR	18	Felipe Inciarte		(substituted in) 66'
LK	19	Diego Ayala		(substituted in) 75'
LK	20	Diego Magno		(substituted in) 40'
CE	21	Joaquín Prada		(substituted in) 62'
WG	22	Tomás Inciarte		(substituted in) 60'
FB	23	Gastón Mieres		(substituted in) 52'
Coach:
(Argentina) Esteban Meneses

FB	15	Dylan Audsley
RW	14	Mike Te'o	(substituted off) 46'
OC	13	Bryce Campbell
IC	12	Paul Lasike	(substituted off) 49'
LW	11	Nate Augspurger (c)
FH	10	Will Magie	(substituted off) 64'
SH	9	Shaun Davies
N8	8	Cam Dolan	(substituted off) 62'
OF	7	Tony Lamborn
BF	6	Hanco Germishuys
RL	5	Ben Landry	(substituted off) 25'
LL	4	Brendan Daly
TP	3	Chris Baumann	(substituted off) 40'
HK	2	Dylan Fawsitt	(substituted off) 52'
LP	1	Huluholo Moungaloa	(substituted off) 62'
Replacements:
HK	16	Peter Malcolm	(substituted in) 52'
PR	17	Tony Purpura	(substituted in) 62'
PR	18	Dino Waldren	(substituted in) 40'
LK	19	Matthew Jensen	(substituted in) 25'
FL	20	Psalm Wooching	(substituted in) 62'
SH	21	Ruben de Haas	(substituted in) 64'
FH	22	Ben Cima	(substituted in) 49'
WG	23	Josh Whippy	(substituted in) 46'
Coach:
(South Africa) Gary Gold

Touch judges:
URU Appt (Uruguay)
URU Appt (Uruguay)
Television match official:
URU Appt (Uruguay)

3 March 2018
18:00 BRST (UTC-02)

Brazil	8–28	Argentina XV (1 BP)
Try: Canterle 39' m Pen: Reeves (1/1) 22'		Try: Zapata 19' c Ezcurra 37' c Ureta 45' c Resino 51' c Con: González (4/4) 20', 38', 46', 52'

Estádio Martins Pereira, São José dos Campos
Attendance: 1,193
Referee: Francisco González (Uruguay)

FB	15	Lucas Tranquez
RW	14	Ariel Rodrigues		(substituted off) 68'
OC	13	Felipe Sancery
IC	12	Moisés Duque
LW	11	Jacobus de Wet van Niekerk			(substituted off) 77'
FH	10	Josh Reeves
SH	9	Will Broderick		(substituted off) 46'
N8	8	André Arruda
OF	7	Matheus Claudio
BF	6	Arthur Bergo
RL	5	Cléber Dias
LL	4	Mauricio Canterle		(substituted off) 61'
TP	3	Jardel Vettorato		(substituted off) 70'	(substituted in) 77'
HK	2	Yan Rosetti (c)
LP	1	Lucas Abud
Replacements:
HK	16	Endy Willian
PR	17	Michel Gomes
PR	18	Matheus Rocha	(yellow card) 76' to 80'	(substituted in) 68'
FL	19	Michael Moraes		(substituted in) 61'
FL	20	Matheus Daniel
SH	21	Daniel Lima		(substituted in) 46'
WG	22	Stefano Giantorno		(substituted in) 68'
CE	23	Valentín Garcia
Coach:
(Argentina) Rodolfo Ambrosio

FB	15	Juan Cruz Mallía
RW	14	Julián Dominguez		(substituted off) 36'
OC	13	Santiago Resino		(substituted off) 68'
IC	12	Lucas Mensa
LW	11	Germán Schulz		(substituted off) 68'
FH	10	Juan Cruz González
SH	9	Felipe Ezcurra		(substituted off) 68'
N8	8	Santiago Portillo		(substituted off) 52'
OF	7	Lautaro Bavaro (c)
BF	6	Francisco Gorrissen
RL	5	Ignacio Larrague		(substituted off) 52'
LL	4	Jerónimo Ureta
TP	3	Benjamín Espinal	(red card) 35'
HK	2	Axel Zapata		(substituted off) 46'
LP	1	Santiago García Botta		(substituted off) 46'
Replacements:
HK	16	Diego Fortuny		(substituted in) 46'
PR	17	Franco Brarda		(substituted in) 46'
PR	18	Lucas Favre		(substituted in) 36'
LK	19	Diego Galetto		(substituted in) 52'
FL	20	Santiago Montagner		(substituted in) 52'
SH	21	Gregorio del Prete		(substituted in) 68'
WG	22	Santiago Álvarez		(substituted in) 68'
WG	23	Rodrigo Etchart		(substituted in) 68'
Coach:
(Argentina) Felipe Contepomi

Touch judges:
Murilo Bragotto (Brazil)
Victor Barboza (Brazil)
Television match official:
CBRU Appt (Brazil)

== Statistics ==
=== Most points ===
Pos	Name	Team	Pts
1	Will Magie	United States	38
2	Juan Cruz González	Argentina XV	34
3	Josh Reeves	Brazil	33
4	Germán Albanell	Uruguay	32
5	Tomás Ianiszewski	Chile	24
6	Hanco Germishuys	United States	20
6	Santiago Resino	Argentina XV	20
6	Mike Te'o	United States	20
9	Juan Manuel Cat	Uruguay	15
9	Manuel Diana	Uruguay	15
9	Tony Lamborn	United States	15

=== Most tries ===
Pos	Name	Team	Tries
1	Hanco Germishuys	United States	4
1	Santiago Resino	Argentina XV	4
1	Mike Te'o	United States	4
4	Juan Manuel Cat	Uruguay	3
4	Manuel Diana	Uruguay	3
4	Tony Lamborn	United States	3
7	Santiago Arata	Uruguay	2
7	Dylan Audsley	United States	2
7	Nate Augspurger	United States	2
7	Ray Barkwill	Canada	2
7	Bryce Campbell	United States	2
7	Cole Davis	Canada	2
7	Jacobus de Wet van Niekerk	Brazil	2
7	Federico Favaro	Uruguay	2
7	Francisco Ferronato	Argentina XV	2
7	Paul Lasike	United States	2
7	Leandro Leivas	Uruguay	2
7	Ryan Matyas	United States	2
7	Lucas Mensa	Argentina XV	2
7	Gastón Mieres	Uruguay	2
7	Santiago Montagner	Argentina XV	2
7	D. T. H. van der Merwe	Canada	2
7	Axel Zapata	Argentina XV	2
7	Ítalo Zunino	Chile	2

== Attendances ==
=== Top 5 ===
	Game	Home team	Visitor	Attendance	Sources
1	1	Canada	Uruguay	16,132	
2	4	Argentina	Canada	7,500	
3	1	United States	Argentina	6,500	
4	3	Uruguay	Argentina	4,000	
5	2	Brazil	Uruguay	3,500	

=== Average home attendances ===
Pos	Team	GP	Total	High	Low	Average
1	Canada	2	17,632	16,132	1,500	8,816
2	Argentina	2	8,400	7,500	900	4,200
4	United States	3	11,000	6,500	2,000	3,666
3	Uruguay	2	6,500	4,000	2,500	3,250
5	Brazil	3	5,754	3,500	1,061	1,918
6	Chile	3	3,700	1,500	1,000	1,233
