= 2017 World Rugby Americas Pacific Challenge =

2017 Americas Pacific Challenge
Tournament details
- Date: 7–15 October 2017
- Countries: Argentina XV; Canada A Samoa A Tonga A USA Selects; Uruguay A
- Teams: 6

Final positions
- Champions: Argentina XV
- Runner-up: USA Selects

Tournament statistics
- Matches played: 9
- Tries scored: 87 (9.67 per match)
- Top scorer(s): (Argentina) Juan Cruz González (46)
- Most tries: (Argentina) Sebastián Cancelliere (5)

The 2017 World Rugby Americas Pacific Challenge was the second tournament of the Americas Pacific Challenge, which is a development competition for the Americas and Pacific island nations. The competition was hosted by Uruguay with all games played at the 14,000 capacity stadium Estadio Charrúa in Montevideo.

== Format ==
With six teams in the tournament and a limitation of three matches per team, a "split pool" format was used. The field was split into two pools, with teams in one pool only playing the teams in the other. The competing teams were:

Pool A

- Argentina XV
- Tonga A
- USA Selects

Pool B

- Canada A
- Samoa A
- Uruguay A

== Table ==
Final standings for combined pools:

| Rank | Team | Games | | | | Points | | | Tries | | Try Bonus | Losing Bonus | Table Points |
| Rank | Team | P | W | D | L | PF | PA | Diff | TF | TA | Try Bonus | Losing Bonus | Table Points |
|---|---|---|---|---|---|---|---|---|---|---|---|---|---|
| 1 | Argentina XV | 3 | 3 | 0 | 0 | 238 | 38 | +200 | 24 | 5 | 3 | 0 | 15 |
| 2 | USA Selects | 3 | 2 | 0 | 1 | 120 | 110 | +10 | 18 | 16 | 3 | 0 | 11 |
| 3 | Tonga A | 3 | 2 | 0 | 1 | 87 | 77 | +10 | 13 | 10 | 2 | 0 | 10 |
| 4 | Samoa A | 3 | 1 | 0 | 2 | 90 | 142 | -52 | 13 | 22 | 2 | 1 | 7 |
| 5 | Uruguay A | 3 | 1 | 0 | 2 | 77 | 156 | -79 | 10 | 22 | 2 | 0 | 6 |
| 6 | Canada A | 3 | 0 | 0 | 2 | 58 | 147 | -98 | 9 | 23 | 1 | 0 | 1 |
Updated: 15 October 2017; Source: World Rugby; Four points for a win, two for a draw, and no points for a bye. One bonus point for scoring four or more tries in a match. One bonus point for losing by seven or less. The tie-break mechanism for teams finishing on the same table points has not been sourced.

== Fixtures ==
All times are local UYT (UTC-03)

The matches were announced on 14 September 2017.

=== Round 1 ===
| 7 October 2017 | USA Selects | 26–48 | Samoa A | Estadio Charrúa, Montevideo |
| 11:30 | Try: T. Maupin 37'; P. Malcolm 40'; M. Wilson 64′ B. Campbell 71′ Con: B. Cima (2/2) 38', 40'; J. Eloff (1/2) 72′ | Report | Try: L. Leilua 16'; E. Alofipo 28'; T. Viliamu 41'; S. Tuiletufuga 46'; T. Fonoti 48'; I. Tino 51'; R. Tapu 58'; Con: A. Fruean (5/7) 17', 29', 42', 47', 59'; Pen: A. Fruean (1/1) 14' | Attendance: 200; Referee: Joaquín Montes (URU) |

Team details

| FB | 15 | Martini Talapusi |
| RW | 14 | Mitch Wilson |
| OC | 13 | Tim Maupin |
| IC | 12 | Bryce Campbell |
| LW | 11 | Zach Pangelinan |
| FH | 10 | Ben Cima |
| SH | 9 | Ruben de Haas |
| N8 | 8 | Jackson Kaka |
| OF | 7 | Aladdin Schirmer |
| BF | 6 | Hanco Germishuys (red card) 43' |
| RL | 5 | Brendan Daly |
| LL | 4 | Matt Jensen |
| TP | 3 | Angus MacLellan |
| HK | 2 | Peter Malcolm |
| LP | 1 | Alex Maughan |
Replacements:
| HK | 16 | Alex Vorster |
| PR | 17 | Chance Wenglewski |
| PR | 18 | Huluholo Mo'ungaloa |
| LK | 19 | Brendan Hardiman |
| FL | 20 | Psalm Wooching |
| SH | 21 | Holden Yungert |
| FH | 22 | JP Eloff |
| WG | 23 | Lemoto Filikitonga |
Coach:
(United States) Scott Lawrence

| FB | 15 | Paulo Scanlan |
| RW | 14 | Elisapeta Alofipo |
| OC | 13 | Tagaloa Fonoti |
| IC | 12 | Kaino Thomsen |
| LW | 11 | La'aloi Leilua |
| FH | 10 | Aukuso Fruean |
| SH | 9 | Ionatana Tino |
| N8 | 8 | Suamalie Tuiletufuga |
| OF | 7 | Joseph Fuimaono |
| BF | 6 | Mikaele Tapili |
| RL | 5 | Aukusitino Ulugia |
| LL | 4 | Ikifusi Matamu |
| TP | 3 | Tiamu Viliamu |
| HK | 2 | Noel Sanft |
| LP | 1 | Rodney Tapu |
Replacements:
| HK | 16 | Ripine Fualau |
| PR | 17 | Tuaniu Tuaniu |
| PR | 18 | Setu Enoka |
| LK | 19 | Lester Sefo |
| FL | 20 | Fili Setu |
| SH | 21 | Melani Matavao |
| CE | 22 | Ricky Pauli Ene |
| WG | 23 | Iafeta Purcell |
Coach:
(Samoa) Potu Leavasa

| 7 October 2017 | Argentina XV | 71–17 | Canada A | Estadio Charrúa, Montevideo |
| 14:00 | Try: S. Cancelliere (2) 3', 27'; N. Cantarutti 20'; J. Gonzalez 22'; F. Molina 32'; B. Delguy (2) 40', 49′ G. Baldunciel 46′ R. Etchart 53′ F. Cuaranta 70′ B. Espinal 73′ Con: J. González (8/11) 4', 21', 23', 33', 50′, 54′ 71′, 74′ | Report | Try: A. Ferguson 38'; C. Keys 57′ G. du Toit 67′ Con: G. du Toit 1/2 (68′) | Referee: Francisco González (URU) |

Team details

| FB | 15 | Bautista Delguy |
| RW | 14 | Germán Schulz |
| OC | 13 | Juan Cruz Mallía |
| IC | 12 | Santiago Mare |
| LW | 11 | Franco Cuaranta |
| FH | 10 | Juan Cruz González |
| SH | 9 | Sebastián Cancelliere |
| N8 | 8 | Santiago Portillo |
| OF | 7 | Lautaro Bavaro |
| BF | 6 | Mariano Romanini |
| RL | 5 | Juan Cruz Guillemaín |
| LL | 4 | Franco Molina |
| TP | 3 | Santiago Medrano |
| HK | 2 | Gaspar Baldunciel |
| LP | 1 | Felipe Arregui |
Replacements:
| HK | 16 | Axel Zapata |
| PR | 17 | Franco Brarda |
| PR | 18 | Benjamín Espinal |
| LK | 19 | Ignacio Larrague |
| FL | 20 | Rodrigo Bruni |
| SH | 21 | Nicolás Cantarutti |
| CE | 22 | Juan Cappiello |
| WG | 23 | Rodrigo Etchart |
Coach:
(Argentina) Felipe Contepomi

| FB | 15 | Aidan McMullan |
| RW | 14 | Conor Desmond |
| OC | 13 | Mike Nieuwenhuysen |
| IC | 12 | Giuseppe du Toit |
| LW | 11 | Brett Johnson |
| FH | 10 | Patrick Parfrey |
| SH | 9 | Andrew Ferguson |
| N8 | 8 | Travis Larsen |
| OF | 7 | Lucas Rumball |
| BF | 6 | Kyle Gilmour |
| RL | 5 | Conor Keys |
| LL | 4 | Adrian Wadden |
| TP | 3 | Cole Keith |
| HK | 2 | Martial Lagain |
| LP | 1 | Hubert Buydens |
Replacements:
| HK | 16 | Eric Howard |
| PR | 17 | Rob Brouwer |
| PR | 18 | Ryan Kotlewski |
| LK | 19 | Liam Chisholm |
| FL | 20 | Dustin Dobravsky |
| SH | 21 | Jorden Sandover-Best |
| FH | 22 | Robbie Povey |
| WG | 23 | Kainoa Lloyd |
Coach:
(England) Mike Shelley

| 7 October 2017 | Tonga A | 25–34 | Uruguay A | Estadio Charrúa, Montevideo |
| 16:30 | Try: F. Kaumavae 32'; S. Lolohea 54'; H. Tu'ivai 63'; Con: S. Muna (1/1) 33'; J. Faiva (1/2) 64'; Pen: S. Muna (2/2) 8', 20' | Report | Try: M. Diana 28'; F. Favaro (2) 38', 47'; Penalty try 75'; Con: F. Favaro (3/3) 29', 39', 48'; Pen: F. Favaro (2/2) 18', 36' | Referee: Vlad Iordachescu (FRR) |

Team details

| FB | 15 | Sione Ika |
| RW | 14 | Heamatangi Tu'ivai |
| OC | 13 | Fetuli Paea |
| IC | 12 | Fe'ofa'aki Kaumavae |
| LW | 11 | Soape Polutele |
| FH | 10 | Samiu Muna |
| SH | 9 | Sosaia Tokai |
| N8 | 8 | Topui Sekona |
| OF | 7 | Sione Tupou |
| BF | 6 | Taniela Na'a |
| RL | 5 | Atunaisa Faka'osi |
| LL | 4 | Vainanuma Manu |
| TP | 3 | Makasine Lutua |
| HK | 2 | Sione Lolohea |
| LP | 1 | Loiola Vea (yellow card) 27' to 37' |
Replacements:
| HK | 16 | Leiataua Kilifi |
| PR | 17 | Solomone Kioa |
| PR | 18 | Misinale Taukalo |
| LK | 19 | Faiva Sailosi |
| FL | 20 | Aisea Puaka |
| SH | 21 | James Faiva |
| FH | 22 | Paki Afu |
| WG | 23 | Posiana Kamoto |
Coach:
(Tonga) Isi Fatani

| FB | 15 | Gastón Gibernau |
| RW | 14 | Leandro Leivas |
| OC | 13 | Joaquín Prada |
| IC | 12 | Agustín Della Corte |
| LW | 11 | Federico Favaro |
| FH | 10 | Lucas Durán |
| SH | 9 | Guillermo Lijtenstein |
| N8 | 8 | Manuel Diana |
| OF | 7 | Gonzalo Soto |
| BF | 6 | Rodolfo Garese |
| RL | 5 | Diego Ayala |
| LL | 4 | Diego Magno |
| TP | 3 | Mario Sagario |
| HK | 2 | Germán Kessler |
| LP | 1 | Matías Benítez |
Replacements:
| HK | 16 | Carlos Pombo |
| PR | 17 | Carlos Arboleya |
| PR | 18 | Facundo Gattas |
| LK | 19 | Juan Diego Ormaechea |
| FL | 20 | Leandro Segredo (yellow card) 76' to 80' |
| SH | 21 | Nicolás Freitas |
| CE | 22 | Baltasar Brum |
| WG | 23 | Rodrigo Bocking |
Coach:
(Uruguay) Oscar Durán

=== Round 2 ===
| 11 October 2017 | Tonga A | 31–15 | Canada A | Estadio Charrúa, Montevideo |
| 11:30 | Try: S. Lolohea 21'; P. Afu (2) 27', 61'; F. Paea 36'; S. Ika 38'; Con: S. Muna (2/3) 28', 62'; J. Faiva (1/2) 39' | Report | Try: K. Gilmour 70'; P. Parfrey 75'; Con: R. Povey (1/2) 76'; Pen: R. Povey (1/1) 14' | Attendance: 200; Referee: Joaquin Montes (URU) |

Team details

| FB | 15 | Sione Ika |
| RW | 14 | Johnny Loseli |
| OC | 13 | Fe'ofa'aki Kaumavae |
| IC | 12 | Paki Afu |
| LW | 11 | Fetuli Paea |
| FH | 10 | James Faiva |
| SH | 9 | Samiu Muna |
| N8 | 8 | Topui Sekona |
| OF | 7 | Taniela Na'a |
| BF | 6 | Atunaisa Faka'osi |
| RL | 5 | Katilimoni Tu'ipulotu |
| LL | 4 | Vainanuma Manu |
| TP | 3 | Makasine Lutua |
| HK | 2 | Sione Lolohea |
| LP | 1 | Loiola Vea |
Replacements:
| HK | 16 | Leiataua Kilifi |
| PR | 17 | Solomone Kioa |
| PR | 18 | Misinale Taukalo |
| LK | 19 | Puniani Malafu |
| FL | 20 | Kuli Tonga (yellow card) 69' to 79' |
| SH | 21 | Paula Folau |
| FH | 22 | Heamatangi Tu'ivai |
| WG | 23 | Posiana Kamoto |
Coach:
(Tonga) Isi Fatani

| FB | 15 | Mitch Richardson |
| RW | 14 | Karsten Leitner |
| OC | 13 | Conor Desmond |
| IC | 12 | Giuseppe du Toit |
| LW | 11 | Kainoa Lloyd |
| FH | 10 | Robbie Povey |
| SH | 9 | Jorden Sandover-Best |
| N8 | 8 | Travis Larsen |
| OF | 7 | Peter Milazzo |
| BF | 6 | Kyle Gilmour |
| RL | 5 | Liam Chisholm |
| LL | 4 | Conor Keys |
| TP | 3 | Ryan Kotlewski |
| HK | 2 | Eric Howard |
| LP | 1 | Rob Brouwer |
Replacements:
| HK | 16 | Ray Barkwill |
| PR | 17 | Liam Murray |
| PR | 18 | Cole Keith |
| LK | 19 | Adrian Wadden |
| FL | 20 | Dustin Dobravsky |
| SH | 21 | Andrew Ferguson |
| FH | 22 | Patrick Parfrey |
| WG | 23 | Mike Nieuwenhuysen |
Coach:
(England) Mike Shelley

| 11 October 2017 | Argentina XV | 85–14 | Samoa A | Estadio Charrúa, Montevideo |
| 14:00 | Try: A. Zapata 6'; B. Delguy 15'; J. Cappiello (2) 20', 37'; G. Schulz (2) 27', 29'; J. González 35'; S. Cancelliere 41'; G. Bertranou (2) 47', 64′ R. Etchart (2) 56', 76′ R. Bruni 80′ Con: J. González (10/13) 7', 16', 21', 28', 30', 42', 48', 57', 77′, 80′ | Report | Try: E. Alofipo 10'; S. Enoka 78′ Con: A. Fruean (1/1) 11'; R. Ene (1/1) 79′ | Attendance: 300; Referee: Francisco González (URU) |

Team details

| FB | 15 | Bautista Delguy |
| RW | 14 | Sebastián Cancelliere, |
| OC | 13 | Santiago Álvarez |
| IC | 12 | Juan Cappiello |
| LW | 11 | Germán Schulz |
| FH | 10 | Juan Cruz González |
| SH | 9 | Gonzalo Bertranou |
| N8 | 8 | Rodrigo Bruni |
| OF | 7 | Lautaro Bavaro |
| BF | 6 | Tomás de la Vega |
| RL | 5 | Ignacio Larrague |
| LL | 4 | Diego Galetto |
| TP | 3 | Benjamín Espinal |
| HK | 2 | Axel Zapata |
| LP | 1 | Franco Brarda |
Replacements:
| HK | 16 | Gaspar Baldunciel |
| PR | 17 | Roberto Tejerizo |
| PR | 18 | Santiago Medrano |
| LK | 19 | Juan Cruz Guillemaín |
| FL | 20 | Santiago Portillo |
| SH | 21 | Santiago Mare |
| CE | 22 | Juan Cruz Mallía |
| WG | 23 | Rodrigo Etchart |
Coach:
(Argentina) Felipe Contepomi

| FB | 15 | Paulo Scanlan (yellow card) 29' to 39' |
| RW | 14 | Elisapeta Alofipo |
| OC | 13 | Leia Saofaiga |
| IC | 12 | Tagaloa Fonoti |
| LW | 11 | La'aloi Leilua |
| FH | 10 | Aukuso Fruean |
| SH | 9 | Ionatana Tino |
| N8 | 8 | Suamalie Tuiletufuga |
| OF | 7 | Joseph Fuimaono |
| BF | 6 | Mikaele Tapili |
| RL | 5 | Aukusitino Ulugia |
| LL | 4 | Ikifusi Matamu (yellow card) 27' to 37' |
| TP | 3 | Tiamu Viliamu |
| HK | 2 | Noel Sanft |
| LP | 1 | Rodney Tapu |
Replacements:
| HK | 16 | Ripine Fualau |
| PR | 17 | Tuaniu Tuaniu |
| PR | 18 | Setu Enoka |
| LK | 19 | Lester Sefo |
| FL | 20 | Fili Setu |
| SH | 21 | Melani Matavao |
| CE | 22 | Ricky Pauli Ene |
| WG | 23 | Taimua Malielegaoi |
Coach:
(Samoa) Potu Leavasa

| 11 October 2017 | USA Selects | 49–36 | Uruguay A | Estadio Charrúa, Montevideo |
| 16:30 | Try: P. Wooching 14'; T. Maupin (2) 20', 60'; A. Schirmer (2) 24', 58'; J. Whippy 48'; Z. Pangelinan 80'; Con: J. Eloff (3/6) 25', 49', 59'; B. Cima (1/1) 80'; Pen: J. Eloff (1/1) 4'; B. Cima (1/1) 74' | Report | Try: D. Magno 29'; G. Mieres 36'; N. Freitas (2) 46', 77'; F. Favaro 68'; Con: J. Prada (2/3) 30', 47'; F. Favaro (2/2) 69', 78'; Pen: J. Prada (1/1) 51' | Attendance: 800; Referee: Federico Anselmi (UAR) |

Team details

| FB | 15 | Mitch Wilson |
| RW | 14 | Tim Maupin |
| OC | 13 | Bryce Campbell |
| IC | 12 | JP Eloff |
| LW | 11 | Josh Whippy |
| FH | 10 | Mike McCarthy |
| SH | 9 | Holden Yungert |
| N8 | 8 | Aladdin Schirmer |
| OF | 7 | Psalm Wooching |
| BF | 6 | Ben Landry |
| RL | 5 | Brendan Hardiman |
| LL | 4 | Brendan Daly |
| TP | 3 | Angus MacLellan |
| HK | 2 | Peter Malcolm |
| LP | 1 | Chance Wenglewski |
Replacements:
| HK | 16 | Alex Vorster |
| PR | 17 | Huluholo Mo'ungaloa |
| PR | 18 | Kelepi Fifita |
| LK | 19 | Matt Jensen |
| FL | 20 | Hanco Germishuys |
| SH | 21 | Ruben de Haas |
| FH | 22 | Ben Cima |
| WG | 23 | Zach Pangelinan |
Coach:
(United States) Scott Lawrence

| FB | 15 | Francisco López |
| RW | 14 | Gastón Mieres |
| OC | 13 | Joaquín Prada |
| IC | 12 | Rodrigo Bocking |
| LW | 11 | Nicolás Freitas |
| FH | 10 | Lucas Durán |
| SH | 9 | Guillermo Lijtenstein |
| N8 | 8 | Juan Diego Ormaechea |
| OF | 7 | Leandro Segredo |
| BF | 6 | Marcos Chamyan |
| RL | 5 | Mathias Palomeque |
| LL | 4 | Diego Magno |
| TP | 3 | Carlos Arboleya |
| HK | 2 | Carlos Pombo |
| LP | 1 | Facundo Gattas |
Replacements:
| HK | 16 | Germán Kessler |
| PR | 17 | Matías Benítez |
| PR | 18 | Felipe Inciarte |
| LK | 19 | Diego Ayala |
| FL | 20 | Gonzalo Soto |
| SH | 21 | Baltasar Brum |
| CE | 22 | Federico Favaro |
| WG | 23 | Gastón Gibernau |
Coach:
(Uruguay) Oscar Durán

=== Round 3 ===
| 15 October 2017 | Tonga A | 31–28 | Samoa A | Estadio Charrúa, Montevideo |
| 11:30 | Try: Faiva; Kamoto; Muna; Kilifi; Sekona; Con: Muna (3/5) | Report | Try: Matavao (2); Alofipo; Leilua; Con: Ene (4/4); Pen: Ene (0/1) | Referee: Federico Anselmi (UAR) |

| 15 October 2017 | Canada A | 26–45 | USA Selects | Estadio Charrúa, Montevideo |
| 14:00 | Try: Lloyd; Barkwill; Rumball du Toit; Con: Povey | Report | Try: Germishuys (4); Campbell; MacLellan de Haas; Con: Eloff (3/4); Cima (2/3) | Referee: Federico Anselmi (UAR) |

| 15 October 2017 | Argentina XV | 82–7 | Uruguay A | Estadio Charrúa, Montevideo |
| 16:00 | Try: Cancelliere (2); Vega; Mallía (3); Álvarez; Bruni; Cantarutti; Zapata; Con: Cantarutti (11/12) | Report | Try: Ormaechea; Con: Prada | Referee: Vlad Iordachescu (FRR) |

== See also ==
- 2017 end-of-year rugby union internationals
- Americas Rugby Championship
- World Rugby Pacific Challenge
