= Brendan Daly =

Brendan Daly may refer to:

- Brendan Daly (politician) (born 1940), former Fianna Fáil Party politician in Ireland
- Brendan Daly (American football) (born 1975), American football coach
- Brendan Daly (rugby union), (born 1990), American rugby union player
