= Huluholo Moungaloa =

US international rugby union player (born 1989)

- Full name: Huluholo Etueni Lopeti Moungaloa
- Born: December 13, 1989 (age 36)
- Height: 6 ft 2 in (1.88 m)
- Weight: 260 lb (120 kg)

Rugby union career
- Position: Prop
- Current team: Utah Warriors
Amateur team(s)
Years	Team	Apps	(Points)
2015-2019	Life West		
- Correct as of October 3, 2018
Senior career
Years	Team	Apps	(Points)
2019-present	Utah Warriors		
International career
Years	Team	Apps	(Points)
2017–present	USA Islanders		
2017	USA Selects	2	(0)
2017–present	United States	6	(5)
- Correct as of October 3, 2018

Huluholo Etueni Lopeti Moungaloa (born December 13, 1989) is a rugby union player who plays prop for the Utah Warriors in Major League Rugby (MLR). He also plays for the United States men's national team.

Moungaloa also played for Life West, for the USA Selects and the USA Islanders.

== Club career ==
As of the 2018 season, Moungaloa plays for the Life West Gladiators in the Pacific Rugby Premiership. In July 2017, Moungaloa was named to the roster of the USA Islanders for an August exhibition match against Saracens. Moungaloa started at prop in the Islanders' inaugural match on August 10, 2017—a 92–0 defeat in Bermuda.

== International career ==
=== USA Selects ===
In September 2017, it was announced that Moungaloa had been selected for the USA Selects roster for the 2017 Americas Pacific Challenge. Moungaloa made his debut with the USA Selects on October 7, 2017, appearing as a substitute, in the Selects' 48–26 defeat to Samoa.

=== USA Eagles ===
In late 2017, it was announced that Moungaloa had been selected for the USA Eagles roster for their end-of-year tests, taking the roster spot of an injured Eric Fry. Moungaloa made his debut with the Eagles on November 18, 2017, appearing as a 71st minute substitute, in the Eagles' 46–17 victory over Germany. Moungaloa made his first start for the Eagles on February 17, 2018, in the Eagles' 45–13 victory over Chile in the 2018 Americas Rugby Championship (ARC). Moungaloa scored his first try for the Eagles on February 24, 2018, starting at prop, in the Eagles' 43–16 victory over Brazil in the ARC.
