= Psalm Wooching =

American rugby union player (b. 1994)

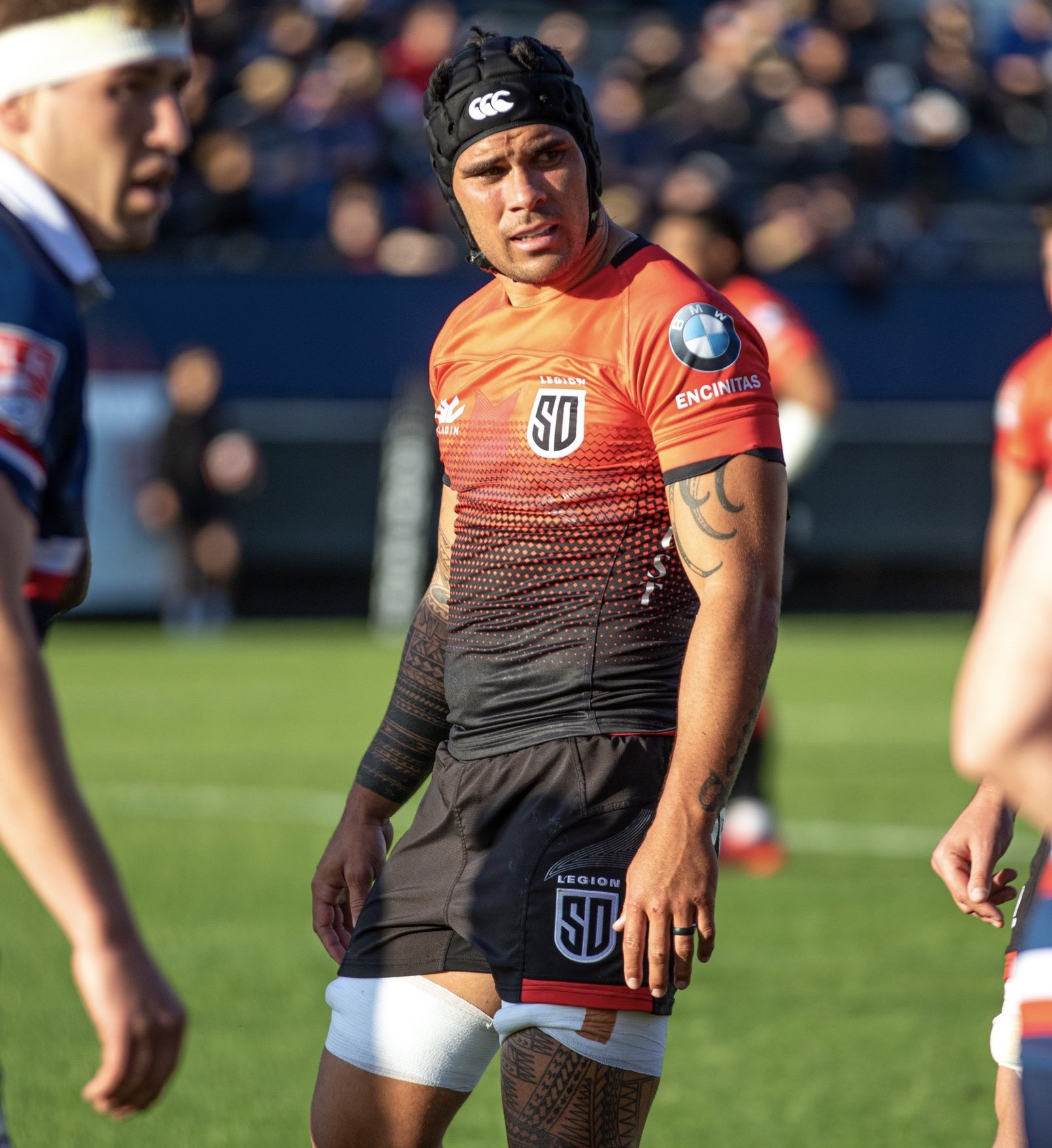
- Born: Psalm Fa'afoisia Pulemagafa Wooching; January 16, 1994 (age 32) Kailua-Kona, Hawaii
- Height: 6 ft 3 in (1.91 m)
- Weight: 238 lb (108 kg)
- School: Kealakehe High School
- University: University of Washington
- Notable relative: Hero Wooching (Professional Singer)

Rugby union career
- Position: Flanker
Amateur team(s)
Years	Team	Apps	(Points)
c. 2006 – c. 2012	Kona Bulls		
c. 2016 – c. 2017	Seattle Saracens		
- Correct as of November 21, 2018
Senior career
Years	Team	Apps	(Points)
2017	Harlequin F.C. 10s		
2017	Hong Kong Scottish 10s		
2019	San Diego Legion	19	(15)
2021	Rouen		
- Correct as of 07 May 2022
International career
Years	Team	Apps	(Points)
2017–2018	USA Selects	6	(6)
2018–	United States	5	(5)
- Correct as of 10 July 2021
- Football career

No. 28
- Position: Linebacker

Personal information
- Listed height: 6 ft 4 in (1.93 m)
- Listed weight: 238 lb (108 kg)

Career information
- College: Washington (2012–2016)

Psalm Fa'afoisia Pulemagafa Wooching (born January 16, 1994) is an American rugby union player who plays for the United States men's national team. He formerly played for the San Diego Legion in the Major League Rugby (MLR).

He has previously played for the USA Selects and Seattle Saracens. Prior to his career in rugby, Wooching played college football for the University of Washington Huskies, playing as a fullback and linebacker. Despite significant interest from NFL teams, Wooching announced that he would be pursuing a career in professional rugby, and not football, ahead of the 2017 NFL draft. Wooching made his debut for the United States men's national rugby team in 2018 in the Americas Rugby Championship.

== Early life ==
Wooching is a Hawaiian of Samoan descent. He first played rugby as a youth before being introduced to football in high school.

== College football career ==
Wooching redshirted his true freshman season for the Washington Huskies in 2012. Originally recruited as a fullback, Wooching was eventually converted to linebacker and made contributions both on defense and special teams. In his junior season (2015), he played in all 13 games and recorded two tackles in the 2015 Heart of Dallas Bowl—a 44–31 victory over Southern Mississippi. In his senior season (2016), he played in all 14 games, starting 13, and had 42 total tackles, with two forced fumbles, and one fumble recovery. Following the regular season, he received an honorable mention to the 2016 All-PAC-12 Conference Team. He served as a captain for the Huskies at the 2016 Peach Bowl in that season's College Football Playoff semifinal. He made three tackles and forced one fumble in that game—a 24–7 loss to the University of Alabama.

On February 16, 2017, after the conclusion of his senior season with Washington, Wooching announced his intention to forego a potential career in the NFL and pursue a career in professional rugby. In his announcement about the decision, he described rugby as his "first love" and the first sport that he ever excelled in.

== Club rugby career ==
=== Early career ===
After his announcement that he would be pursuing a career in professional rugby, Wooching participated in a tryout with French club Pau. In May 2017, Wooching signed a contract for a trial at Harlequin F.C. as a member of their World Club 10s squad. Also in 2017, Wooching had a brief stint with Hong Kong Scottish, playing as a hooker for their GFI Hong Kong Tens squad. In 2016 and 2017, he played for Seattle Saracens in the CDI Premier League of the British Columbia Rugby Union.

=== Rugby Viadana ===
In March 2018, Wooching signed a contract to play for Rugby Viadana in the Italian Eccellenza for the 2018–19 season. In June 2018, it was announced that Wooching's contract with Viadana had been cancelled by mutual consent due to "physical problems".

=== San Diego Legion ===
In late 2018, Wooching signed with the San Diego Legion of Major League Rugby for the 2019 season.

=== Rouen Normandie ===
In 2021, Wooching signed with Rouen of Rugby Pro D2 in France. He began playing for them in the 2022 season.

== International rugby career ==
=== USA Selects ===
Wooching made his first appearance representing the United States in the USA Selects' 48–26 defeat to Samoa in the 2017 Americas Pacific Challenge. Wooching scored his first try in international play on October 11, 2017, in a 49–36 Americas Pacific Challenge victory over Uruguay. In September 2018, it was announced that Wooching had been selected for the Selects roster for the 2018 Americas Pacific Challenge.

=== USA Eagles ===
Wooching made his debut with the USA Eagles on February 17, 2018, starting at flanker in the Eagles' 45–13 victory over Chile in the Americas Rugby Championship. Wooching scored his first try for the Eagles as a substitute in the Eagles' 61–19 victory over Uruguay on March 3, 2018.
