= Hanco Germishuys =

US international rugby union player (born 1996)

- Full name: Hanco Jacobus Germishuys
- Born: August 24, 1996 (age 30) Kimberley, Northern Cape, South Africa
- Height: 6 ft 2 in (1.88 m)
- Weight: 224 lb (16.0 st; 224 lb; 102 kg)
- School: Strand High School

Rugby union career
- Position(s): Flanker; Number 8 Hooker
- Current team: Houston SaberCats
Youth career
- 2014–2015: Gloucester Academy
- 2015: Sharks Academy
Amateur team(s)
Years	Team	Apps	(Points)
2014–2015	West Omaha		
2015–2016	Glendale Raptors		
2017	Austin Huns		
Senior career
Years	Team	Apps	(Points)
2016	Denver Stampede	9	(30)
2018	Austin Elite	6	(30)
2019	Glendale Raptors	5	(0)
2020–2021	Rugby United New York	16	(25)
2022	LA Giltinis	12	(40)
2023–	Houston SaberCats	7	(5)
- Correct as of 26 June 2023
International career
Years	Team	Apps	(Points)
2011–2014	United States U19		
2014–2016	United States U20	7	(50)
2016–	USA Selects	8	(10)
2016–	United States	26	(70)
- Correct as of 3 October 2021

Hanco Jacobus Germishuys (born August 24, 1996) is a South African born American rugby union player who plays as a flanker for the Houston SaberCats in Major League Rugby (MLR) and for the United States national rugby union team internationally.

He previously played for Rugby United New York (RUNY) and the LA Giltinis in MLR.

Germishuys has also represented the United States at the international level with multiple age-grade sides and with the USA Selects.

Germishuys also previously played professionally for the Denver Stampede of PRO Rugby.

== Early life ==
Hanco Germishuys was born on August 24, 1996, in South Africa. There, he began playing rugby at a young age and attended school in Newton. Germishuys relocated to the United States with his father in 2004 and attended Westside High School in Omaha, Nebraska. Germishuys played club rugby for West Omaha and was selected to a Nebraska All-Star team. In late 2014, Germishuys joined the Gloucester Academy, scoring a try in his second appearance for the U18 squad. In June 2015, Germishuys also spent four weeks with the Sharks Academy. Germishuys joined the Glendale Raptors (since renamed the Glendale Merlins) midway through the 2015 season, winning that season's Pacific Rugby Premiership championship.

== Club career ==
=== Denver Stampede ===
Ahead of PRO Rugby's inaugural season in 2016, Germishuys joined the Denver Stampede. Germishuys made his debut with the Stampede on May 15, 2016, starting at flanker and scoring two tries, in Denver's 36–13 victory over Sacramento. Germishuys scored six total tries for the Stampede across nine total appearances for the club.

=== Austin Huns ===
Germishuys joined the Austin Huns in January 2017. Germishuys was named Most Valuable Player (equivalent to man of the match) in the Huns' 23–20 Division 1 national championship victory over the New York Athletic Club in June 2017.

=== Austin Elite ===
Prior to the inaugural Major League Rugby season in 2018, Germishuys joined the Austin Elite in the newly formed league. Germishuys made his debut for the Elite in the team's first regular season match on April 21, 2018, starting at flanker and scoring a try, in a 41–26 defeat to Glendale. Over just five appearances for the Elite during the season, Germishuys scored six total tries, putting him in a tie for tenth place among league leaders in individual scoring and a tie for second place among league leaders in individual tries scored. At season's end, Germishuys was named to the All-MLR First Team at flanker.

== International career ==
=== USA High School All-Americans ===
Germishuys was first named to the United States men's national under-19 team (High School All-Americans) at the age of 14 and was with the team for four years.

=== USA Junior All-Americans ===
In March 2014, it was announced that Germishuys had been selected to the roster of the United States men's national under-20 team (Junior All-Americans) for the 2014 IRB Junior World Rugby Trophy. At the time, Germishuys and teammate Ben Cima were so young that they required waivers in order to be allowed to play in the tournament. Germishuys also represented the Junior All-Americans in qualifying matches for the 2015 World Rugby Under 20 Trophy against Canada. Germishuys played in both matches of the two-legged tie, with the Junior All-Americans losing on an aggregate score of 65–29. Germishuys played for the Junior All-Americans for a third consecutive year in 2016, leading the team as captain at the 2016 World Rugby Under 20 Trophy. Germishuys led the team with eight total tries, including at least one in each of the Junior All-American's four matches, and was named Player of the Tournament.

=== USA Selects ===
Germishuys was first named to the USA Selects roster in advance of the 2016 Americas Pacific Challenge. He has subsequently been named to the Selects' roster for the Americas Pacific Challenge in 2017 and 2018.

=== USA Eagles ===
Germishuys made his debut for the United States men's national team on February 27, 2016, coming on as a substitute, in the Eagles' 24–23 defeat to Brazil in the 2016 Americas Rugby Championship. On February 10, 2018, against Canada in a 29–10 victory in the 2018 Americas Rugby Championship, Germishuys made his first start at flanker and scored his first try for the Eagles. Since his debut in 2016, he has become a regular in the Eagles starting lineup and is known for his strength with the ball in hand and his strong tackling.

=== International tries ===
As of 20 November 2021

Try	Opposing team	Location	Venue	Competition	Date	Result	Score
1	Canada	Sacramento, United States	Papa Murphy's Park	2018 Americas Rugby Championship	10 February 2018	Win	29 – 10
2	Brazil	São José dos Campos, Brazil	Estádio Martins Pereira	2018 Americas Rugby Championship	24 February 2018	Win	16 – 45
3	Brazil	São José dos Campos, Brazil	Estádio Martins Pereira	2018 Americas Rugby Championship	24 February 2018	Win	16 – 45
4	Uruguay	Montevideo, Uruguay	Estadio Charrúa	2018 Americas Rugby Championship	3 March 2018	Win	19 – 61
5	Scotland	Houston, United States	BBVA Compass Stadium	2018 June rugby union tests	16 June 2018	Win	30 – 29
6	Samoa	San Sebastián, Spain	Anoeta Stadium	2018 end-of-year rugby union internationals	10 November 2018	Win	30 – 29
7	Chile	Maipu, Chile	Estadio Santiago Bueras	2019 Americas Rugby Championship	2 February 2019	Win	8 – 71
8	Brazil	Round Rock, United States	Dell Diamond	2019 Americas Rugby Championship	23 February 2019	Win	33 – 28
9	Japan	Suva, Fiji	ANZ National Stadium	2019 World Rugby Pacific Nations Cup	10 August 2019	Loss	20 – 34
10	England	London, England	Twickenham Stadium	2021 July rugby union tests	4 July 2021	Loss	43 – 29
11	Canada	St. John's, Canada	Swiler's Rugby Park	2023 Rugby World Cup – Americas qualification	4 September 2021	Loss	34 – 21
12	Canada	Glendale, United States	Infinity Park	2023 Rugby World Cup – Americas qualification	11 September 2021	Win	38 – 16
13	Canada	Glendale, United States	Infinity Park	2023 Rugby World Cup – Americas qualification	11 September 2021	Win	38 – 16
14	Canada	Glendale, United States	Infinity Park	2023 Rugby World Cup – Americas qualification	11 September 2021	Win	38 – 16
