= Diego Fortuny =

Argentine rugby union player

- Full name: Diego Fortuny
- Born: 27 September 1991 (age 35) Salta, Argentina
- Height: 170 cm (5 ft 7 in)
- Weight: 105 kg (231 lb; 16 st 7 lb)
- University: Catholic University of Salta

Rugby union career
- Position: Hooker
- Current team: American Raptors
Senior career
Years	Team	Apps	(Points)
2015-2019	Universitario Salta	??	(??)
2020-2022	Houston Sabercats	21	(5)
2022-	American Raptors	12	(15)
- Correct as of 8 March 2024
Super Rugby
Years	Team	Apps	(Points)
2018	Jaguares	1	
International career
Years	Team	Apps	(Points)
2011	Argentina under-20	4	(0)
2018-2019	Argentina XV	14	(10)
2018	Argentina under-20		
- Correct as of 8 March 2024

Diego Fortuny (born 27 September 1991) is an Argentine rugby union player who plays for the Houston SaberCats in Major League Rugby (MLR). He also plays for the Jaguares in Super Rugby.

On 2 January 2018, Diego was named in the Jaguares squad for the 2018 Super Rugby season.
