= Josh Whippy =

United States rugby union player (b. 1990)

- Full name: Joshua Whippy
- Born: October 30, 1990 (age 36)
- Height: 6 ft 0 in (1.83 m)
- Weight: 220 lb (100 kg)
- School: Church College of New Zealand
- University: Brigham Young University

Rugby union career
- Position: Wing
Amateur team(s)
Years	Team	Apps	(Points)
2010	United Rugby Club		
2017	Utah Selects		
Senior career
Years	Team	Apps	(Points)
2018–present	Utah Warriors	0	(0)
- Correct as of September 28, 2018
International career
Years	Team	Apps	(Points)
2017	USA Selects	2	(5)
2017–present	United States	4	(5)
- Correct as of September 28, 2018
- Football career

No. 36 – BYU Cougars
- Position: Running back

Personal information
- Listed height: 6 ft 1 in (1.85 m)
- Listed weight: 220 lb (100 kg)

Career information
- College: Brigham Young University (2014)

Joshua Whippy (born October 30, 1990) is a rugby union player who plays for the Utah Warriors of Major League Rugby (MLR) and the United States men's national team. Whippy previously played for the USA Selects.

== Early life ==
Josh Whippy was born on October 30, 1990 and grew up in Fiji. Whippy moved to New Zealand to attend Rangitoto College and Church College, where he played both basketball and rugby. In 2010 he played for Utah's United Rugby Club, scoring a try in United's under-19 national championship victory. Whippy then attended Brigham Young University (BYU), where he began playing for the school's rugby team. After an injury ended his freshman season of rugby early, Whippy spent two years as a Mormon missionary. Upon returning to BYU for his sophomore year, Whippy joined the university's football team. Whippy played as a running back and wore number 36 for the Cougars. Whippy also continued to play rugby at BYU, winning multiple national championships. He was also named to the USA Men's Collegiate All-Americans (MCAAs) team in 2014 and 2015 and received an Honorable Mention selection for the MCAAs in 2017. Whippy has also played for the Utah Selects, winning two consecutive club 7s national championships in 2016 and 2017.

== Club career ==
Prior to the start of its inaugural 2018 season, it was announced that Whippy would join the roster for the Utah Warriors of Major League Rugby. In the Warriors' final preseason exhibition against Alberta's Prairie Wolf Pack, Whippy suffered a compound fracture of his lower left leg and missed the rest of the season.

== International career ==
=== USA Selects ===
In September 2017, it was announced that Whippy had been selected for the USA Selects roster for the 2017 Americas Pacific Challenge. Daly made his debut with the USA Selects on October 11, 2017, starting at left wing and scoring a try, in the Selects' 49–36 victory over Uruguay.

=== USA Eagles ===
In October 2017, it was announced that Whippy had been selected for the USA Eagles roster for their end-of-year tests. However, Whippy did not make an appearance with the Eagles at that time. Whippy made his debut with the Eagles on February 10, 2018, appearing as a substitute, in the Eagles' 29–10 victory over Canada in the 2018 Americas Rugby Championship (ARC). Whippy scored his first try for the Eagles on March 3, 2018, appearing as a substitute, in the Eagles' 61–19 victory over Uruguay in the ARC.

== Personal life ==
Josh Whippy has a twin brother named Jared who also plays rugby. The two have played together for United Rugby Club, at BYU, with the Utah Selects, and for the Utah Warriors. Josh got married in December 2016 and had a daughter in January 2018.
