= Paul Lasike =

US international rugby union player (born 1990)

- Born: June 18, 1990 (age 36) Auckland, New Zealand
- Height: 5 ft 11 in (180 cm)
- Weight: 250 lb (113 kg)
- School: Church College of New Zealand
- University: Brigham Young University

Rugby union career
- Position: Centre
- Current team: Utah Warriors
Senior career
Years	Team	Apps	(Points)
2018	Utah Warriors	7	(5)
2018–2021	Harlequins	29	(25)
2022	London Scottish F.C.	3	(0)
2022–2025	Utah Warriors	37	(35)
- Correct as of 9 August 2025
International career
Years	Team	Apps	(Points)
2018–2020	United States	22	(30)
- Correct as of 31 March 2020
- Football career

No. 47
- Position: Fullback

Career information
- College: Brigham Young
- NFL draft: 2015: undrafted

Career history
- Arizona Cardinals (2015)*; Chicago Bears (2015–2016)
- * Offseason or practice squad member only

Career NFL statistics
- Rushing yards: 8
- Rushing average: 2.7
- Receptions: 1
- Receiving yards: 3
- Stats at Pro Football Reference

Paul Lasike (born 18 June 1990) is a New Zealand professional rugby union player for the Utah Warriors in Major League Rugby (MLR). In American football, he played as a fullback in the National Football League (NFL). In international rugby, he plays for the United States national rugby union team. He played college football and rugby at Brigham Young University.

== Early life ==
Lasike is one of 10 children in an ethnic Tongan family. He served a mission for The Church of Jesus Christ of Latter-day Saints in Alabama. Lasike is married to Ani, a native of Santos, Brazil. Ani's family moved to Sacramento, California when she was in her early teens.

== NFL career ==
=== Arizona Cardinals ===
Lasike was signed as an undrafted free agent by the Arizona Cardinals on 5 May 2015, but was waived on 5 September 2015.

=== Chicago Bears ===
Lasike was signed to the Chicago Bears' practice squad on 7 September 2015, but his contract was terminated the next day due to visa problems. On 21 September 2015, Lasike was re-signed to the Bears' practice squad. On 4 January 2016, Lasike signed a futures contract with the Bears. On 20 September 2016, he was released by the Bears. Two days later he was signed to the practice squad. He was elevated to the active roster on 5 October 2016. He was released by the Bears on 20 October 2016, but the Bears then re-signed him to their practice squad the following day. He was promoted to the active roster on 12 November 2016. On 11 May 2017, he was waived by the Bears.

== Rugby union ==
Lasike first came to BYU on a scholarship to play college rugby. He was called into the United States national rugby union team for the 2018 Americas Rugby Championship, earning his debut against Chile.

Lasike first started playing for Utah Warriors during the inaugural 2018 Major League Rugby season. On 3 August 2018, Lasike travelled to England to join Harlequins in the Gallagher Premiership from the 2018–19 season.
