= Cole Davis =

Canadian rugby union player (born 1997)

- Born: 6 July 1997 (age 29) Canada
- Height: 1.88 m (6 ft 2 in)
- Weight: 100 kg (16 st; 220 lb)

Rugby union career
- Position: Wing
Senior career
Years	Team	Apps	(Points)
2021–	Austin Gilgronis	8	(5)
- Correct as of 5 February 2022
International career
Years	Team	Apps	(Points)
2017	Canada U20	4	(0)
2018-	Canada	7	(10)
- Correct as of 5 February 2022
National sevens team
Years	Team		Comps
2019	Canada Sevens		2
- Correct as of 2 June 2021

Cole Davis (born 6 July 1997) is a Canadian rugby union player, currently playing for the Austin Gilgronis of Major League Rugby (MLR) and the Canadian national team. His preferred position is wing.

== Professional career ==
Davis signed for Major League Rugby side Austin Gilgronis ahead of the 2021 Major League Rugby season. Davis made his debut for Canada in the 2018 Americas Rugby Championship. He also represented Canada Sevens in 2019.

== Career statistics ==
As of 5 February 2022

Season	Team	Games	Starts	Sub	Tries	Cons	Pens	Drops	Points	Yel	Red
MLR 2021	Austin Gilgronis	8	3	5	1	0	0	0	5	0	0
Total		8	3	5	1	0	0	0	5	0	0
