= Lucas Mensa =

Argentine rugby union player (born 1996)

- Born: Lucas Mensa; 24 May 1996 (age 30)
- Height: 6 ft 0 in (1.83 m)
- Weight: 207 lb (94 kg; 14 st 11 lb)

Rugby union career
- Position: Centre
- Current team: Oyonnax
Amateur team(s)
Years	Team	Apps	(Points)
2015−2019	Club Pucará	56	(110)
Senior career
Years	Team	Apps	(Points)
2020	Ceibos	2	(0)
2020−2021	Valence Romans	18	(30)
2021-2023	Stade Montois	40	(50)
2023-	Oyonnax	14	(10)
- Correct as of 25 March 2024
International career
Years	Team	Apps	(Points)
2016	Argentina u20s		
2018−	Argentina XV	16	(45)
2019-2020	Argentina	3	(0)
- Correct as of 29 November 2020

Lucas Mensa (born 24 May 1996) is an Argentine professional rugby union player. He plays for Oyonnax in the French Top 14.

He made his debut for the Argentina international team on 17 August 2019 against South Africa in Pretoria, South Africa.

On 19 August 2019 Mensa was named in Argentina's squad for the 2019 Rugby World Cup. He was the only amateur player of the squad.

In February 2023 it was announced that Mensa would join fellow French team Oyonnax for the 2023–24 season.
