= Brendan Daly (rugby union) =

US international rugby union player (b. 1990)

- Full name: Brendan Thomas Daly
- Born: December 20, 1990 (age 35) San Francisco, California, United States
- Height: 6 ft 4 in (1.93 m)
- Weight: 240 lb (110 kg)
- School: St. Ignatius College Preparatory
- University: University of California

Rugby union career
- Position: Lock
Amateur team(s)
Years	Team	Apps	(Points)
- San Francisco Golden Gate
- Correct as of December 25, 2020
Senior career
Years	Team	Apps	(Points)
2016	San Francisco Rush	7	(0)
2018–2020	Colorado Raptors	21	(15)
- Correct as of December 25, 2020
International career
Years	Team	Apps	(Points)
2017–2018	USA Selects	6	(5)
2018–	United States	2	(0)
- Correct as of December 25, 2020

Brendan Thomas Daly (born December 20, 1990) is an American rugby union player who played as a lock for the Colorado Raptors in Major League Rugby (MLR). He also represents America on the United States men's national team, and the USA Selects.

Daly previously played for the San Francisco Rush in the short-lived PRO Rugby.

== Early life ==
Brendan Daly was born on December 20, 1990. Daly attended St. Ignatius College Preparatory (SI). While attending SI, Daly first played for the San Francisco Golden Gate RFC. Daly would later attend the University of California, where he played for the school's rugby teams. While at the University of California, in 2012, Daly received consideration to be named to the USA Men's Collegiate All-Americans (MCAAs) touring team, but was unavailable for the tour. In 2013, Daly received an Honorable Mention selection for the MCAAs. Daly graduated from the University of California's Haas School of Business in 2013. Afterward, Daly returned to play for San Francisco Golden Gate, was named National Club Player of the Year in 2016, and serves as the team's captain.

== Club career ==
Prior to the start of its inaugural 2016 season, it was announced that Daly would join the roster for the San Francisco Rush of PRO Rugby. Daly made his debut with the Rush on May 20, 2016, starting at lock, in the Rush's 41–37 defeat to Denver. The Rush were folded in December 2016, and the rest of the PRO Rugby competition folded soon thereafter.

== International career ==
=== USA Selects ===
In September 2017, it was announced that Daly had been selected for the USA Selects roster for the 2017 Americas Pacific Challenge. Daly made his debut with the USA Selects on October 7, 2017, starting at lock in the Selects' 48–26 defeat to Samoa.

In September 2018, it was announced that Daly would return to the USA Selects roster for the 2018 Americas Pacific Challenge.

=== USA Eagles ===
Daly made his debut with the USA Eagles on February 17, 2018, appearing as a substitute in the Eagles' 45–13 victory over Chile in the 2018 Americas Rugby Championship (ARC). Daly made his first start with the Eagles on March 3, 2018, playing at lock, in the Eagles' 61–19 victory over Uruguay in the ARC.
