= Noah Barker =

Canadian rugby union player

- Born: August 20, 1992 (age 34) Germany
- Height: 1.83 m (6 ft 0 in)
- Weight: 116 kg (256 lb; 18 st 4 lb)
- School: G.P. Vanier Towhees

Rugby union career
- Position(s): Prop, Hooker
Amateur team(s)
Years	Team	Apps	(Points)
2012-2018	James Bay AA		
Senior career
Years	Team	Apps	(Points)
2019-present	Glendale Raptors	9	(0)
Provincial / State sides
Years	Team	Apps	(Points)
2013-present	BC Bears		
International career
Years	Team	Apps	(Points)
2012	Canada u20s		
2018	Canada A		
2018-Present	Canada	7	(0)

Noah Barker (born 20 August 1992 in Germany) is a Canadian rugby union player. He plays primarily as a prop but can also play hooker. Barker previously played for the Canada under 20s team.

In 2019, Barker signed for the Glendale Raptors team who play in the professional Major League Rugby competition.
