= Jake Ilnicki =

Canada international rugby union player

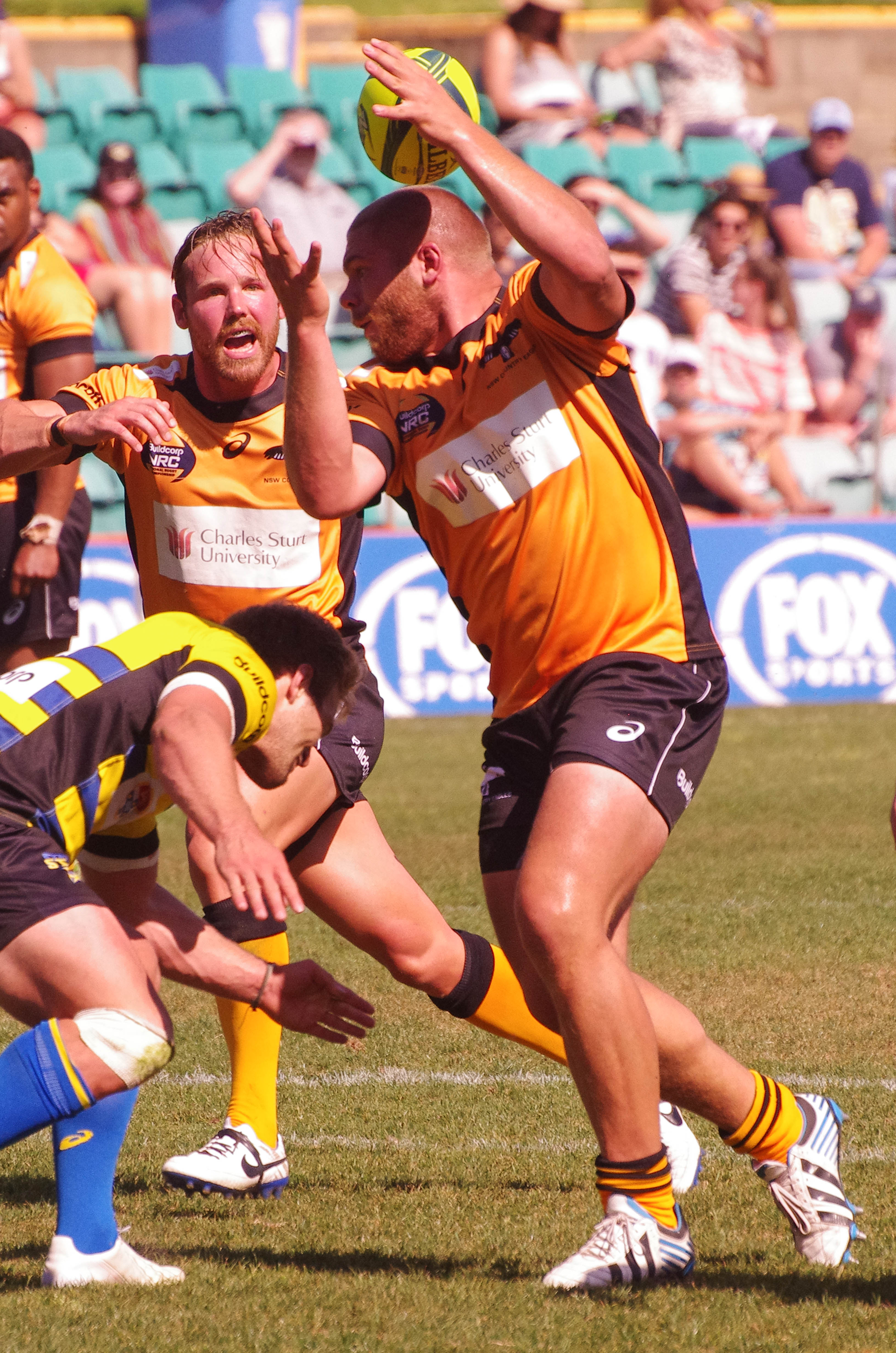
- Born: 24 February 1992 (age 34) Williams Lake, British Columbia
- Height: 1.80 m (5 ft 11 in)
- Weight: 125 kg (276 lb; 19 st 10 lb)

Rugby union career
- Position: Prop
Amateur team(s)
Years	Team	Apps	(Points)
2014-2015	Eastern Suburbs	15	(0)
Senior career
Years	Team	Apps	(Points)
2014	NSW Country Eagles	7	(0)
2016−	San Diego Breakers	6	(0)
2016	Manawatu	6	(0)
2016-2017	Northampton Saints	0	(0)
2017-2018	Newcastle Falcons	1	(0)
2018	Yorkshire Carnegie	7	(0)
2019-2021	Seattle Seawolves	21	(0)
2022-	Old Glory DC	11	(0)
- Correct as of 28 April 2022
International career
Years	Team	Apps	(Points)
2012	Canada U20	4	(0)
2013–	Canada	36	(0)
- Correct as of 9 September 2019

Jake Ilnicki (born 24 February 1992 in Williams Lake, British Columbia) is a Canadian rugby union prop who plays international rugby for Canada and professional club rugby for Old Glory DC in Major League Rugby (MLR). He has also played for the New South Wales Country Eagles in Australia's National Rugby Championship and for the Seattle Seawolves in MLR.

Ilnicki made his debut for Canada in 2013 and was part of the Canada squad at the 2015 Rugby World Cup.

In early 2016, Ilnicki was signed to the San Diego Breakers PRO Rugby team.

In December 2016, Ilnicki joined Aviva Premiership side Northampton Saints. The tight head prop made his first appearance in a Saints shirt during their Aviva 'A' League fixture against Leicester Tigers a few days after signing for the club.

Despite not making any first team appearances while with Saints, the Canadian prop helped Saints' second team the Northampton Wanderers reach the final of the Aviva 'A' League and eventually beat Gloucester United to lift the 2016/17 trophy.

In May 2017, it was announced that Ilnicki would leave Saints at the conclusion of the 2016/17 season. On 4 September 2017, Illnicki signed for English rivals Newcastle Falcons for the remainder of the 2017-18 season.

Near the end of the 2019 Major League Rugby season Ilnicki signed up with the Seattle Seawolves, playing in all their remaining matches that season including the 2019 Major League Rugby final. He stayed with Seattle for two subsequent seasons before signing with Old Glory DC for the 2022 season.

== Club statistics ==
As of 28 March 2022

Season	Team	Games	Starts	Sub	Tries	Cons	Pens	Drops	Points	Yel	Red
MLR 2019	Seattle Seawolves	5	0	5	0	0	0	0	0	0	0
MLR 2020	Seattle Seawolves	4	2	2	0	0	0	0	0	0	0
MLR 2021	Seattle Seawolves	12	4	8	0	0	0	0	0	0	0
MLR 2022	Old Glory DC	11	4	7	0	0	0	0	0	0	0
Total		32	10	22	0	0	0	0	0	0	0
