= Martial Lagain =

Canada international rugby union player

- Born: January 6, 1987 (age 39) France
- Height: 5 ft 9 in (175 cm)
- Weight: 207 lb (94 kg)

Rugby union career
- Position: Hooker
International career
Years	Team	Apps	(Points)
2018	Canada	2	(0)

Martial Lagain (born January 6, 1987) is a French-Canadian former international rugby union player.

A hooker, Lagain played for Tyrosse, Bayonne and Saint Jean de Luz in his native France.

Lagain played with Sherbrooke Abénakis and Atlantic Rock in Canadian rugby. He qualified to represent Canada on residency grounds and received a call up for the 2018 Americas Rugby Championship, where he won caps against Brazil and Chile. A few months later he announced his retirement from representative rugby.

== See also ==
- List of Canada national rugby union players
