= Gaspar Baldunciel =

Argentine rugby union player

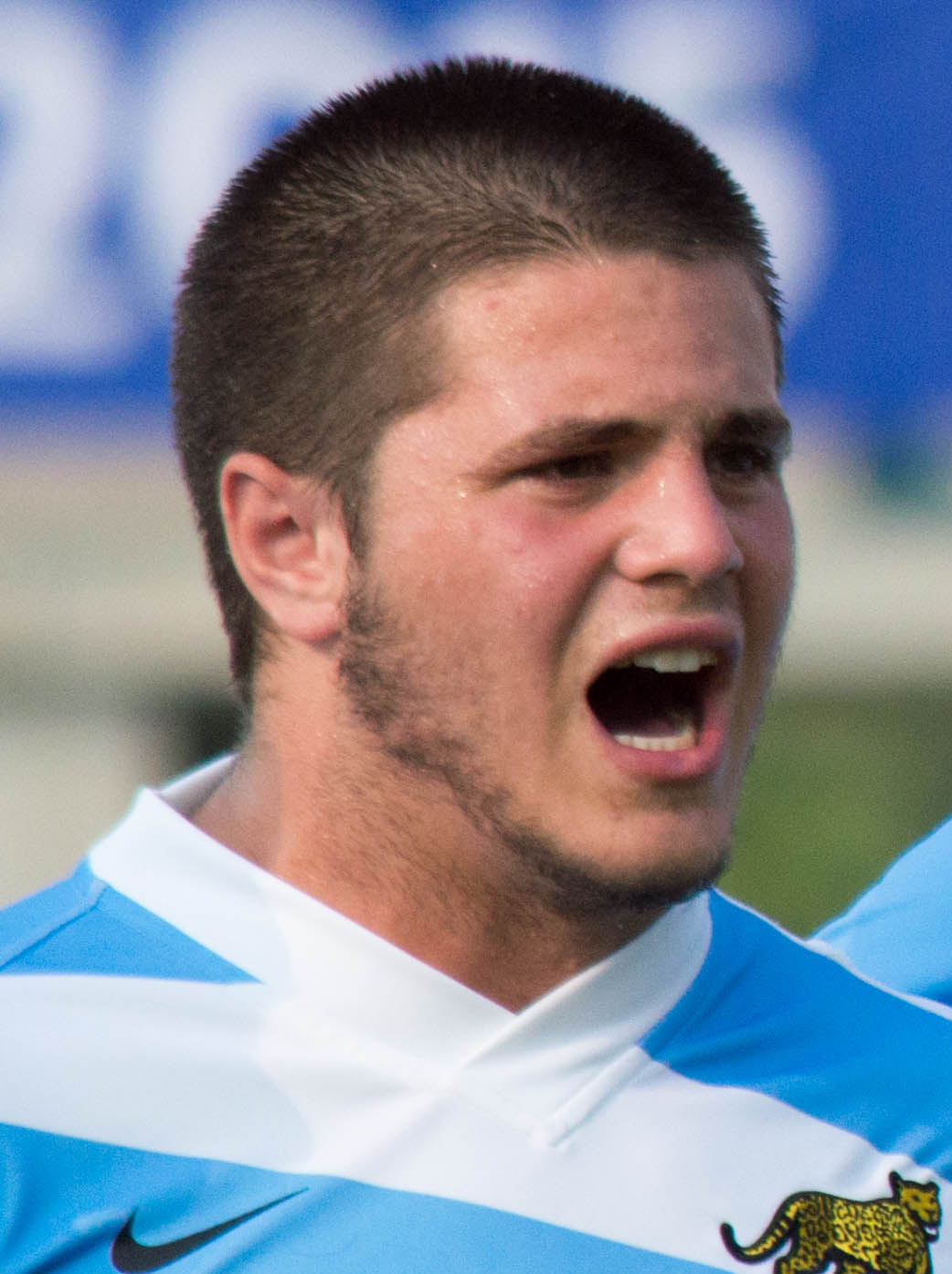
- Full name: Gaspar Baldunciel
- Born: 9 December 1996 (age 29) Argentina
- Height: 5 ft 9 in (1.75 m)
- Weight: 214 lb (97 kg; 15 st 4 lb)

Rugby union career
- Position: Hooker
Senior career
Years	Team	Apps	(Points)
2015–	Alumni	27	(20)
- Correct as of 9 March 2019
Super Rugby
Years	Team	Apps	(Points)
2019–	Jaguares	3	(5)
- Correct as of 9 March 2019
International career
Years	Team	Apps	(Points)
2015−2016	Argentina Under 20	10	(5)
2016−	Argentina XV	22	(20)

Gaspar Baldunciel (born 9 December 1996) is an Argentine rugby union player who plays for the Jaguares. On 28 December 2018, he was named in the Jaguares squad for the 2019 Super Rugby season.
