= Santiago Resino =

Argentine rugby union player (born 1995)

- Born: 21 April 1995 (age 31) Argentina
- Height: 1.77 m (5 ft 9 1/2 in)
- Weight: 86 kg (190 lb; 13 st 8 lb)

Rugby union career
- Position: Centre
Senior career
Years	Team	Apps	(Points)
2016	Universitario de Tucumán	6	(5)
2020	Olímpia Lions	1	(0)
2021	Cafeteros Pro	4	(5)
2022−	Valorugby Emilia		
- Correct as of 3 February 2021
International career
Years	Team	Apps	(Points)
2015	Argentina U20s	3	(0)
2018	Argentina XV	6	(20)
- Correct as of 3 February 2021
National sevens team
Years	Team		Comps
2015	Argentina Sevens		2
- Correct as of 3 February 2021

Santiago Resino (born 21 April 1995) is an Argentine rugby union player, currently playing for Súper Liga Americana de Rugby side Olímpia Lions. His preferred position is centre.

== Professional career ==
Resino signed for Súper Liga Americana de Rugby side Olímpia Lions ahead of the 2020 Súper Liga Americana de Rugby season, before re-signing ahead of the 2021 Súper Liga Americana de Rugby season to play for Cafeteros Pro. He had previously represented Argentina Sevens at two tournaments in 2015.
