= Tomás de la Vega =

Argentine rugby union player (born 1990)

- Born: Tomás de la Vega; 28 September 1990 (age 36) Buenos Aires, Argentina
- Height: 1.92 m (6 ft 4 in)
- Weight: 102 kg (16 st 1 lb)

Rugby union career
- Position: Flanker
- Current team: Toronto Arrows
Amateur team(s)
| Years | Team | Apps | (Points) |
| 2010-2019 | CUBA | 107 | (125) |
Senior career
| Years | Team | Apps | (Points) |
| 2011–2013 | Pampas XV | 10 | (5) |
| 2020− | Toronto Arrows | 5 | (5) |
- Correct as of 3 March 2020
International career
| Years | Team | Apps | (Points) |
| 2009−2010 | Argentina Under 20 | 10 | (30) |
| 2012–2014 | Argentina | 10 | (10) |
| 2011− | Argentina XV | 11 | (20) |
- Correct as of 22 June 2014

Tomás de la Vega (born 28 September 1990 in Buenos Aires) is an Argentine rugby union footballer. He currently plays Flanker for Toronto Arrows in North America's Major League Rugby (MLR). He also represents Argentina internationally.

He was part of the Argentina squad that competed in the 2012 Rugby Championship.
