= Dustin Dobravsky =

Canada international rugby union player

- Born: November 21, 1991 (age 34) Germany
- Height: 6 ft 2 in (1.88 m)
- Weight: 207 lb (94 kg; 14 st 11 lb)
- School: Shawinigan Lake High School
- University: University of Victoria

Rugby union career
- Position(s): Flanker, Number 8
Amateur team(s)
Years	Team	Apps	(Points)
- Castaway Wanderers
Provincial / State sides
Years	Team	Apps	(Points)
2016-present	BC Bears		
International career
Years	Team	Apps	(Points)
2009	Germany u18s		
2018-Present	Canada	8	(0)
- Correct as of 17 October 2019
National sevens team
Years	Team		Comps
2010-	Canada		

Dustin Dobravsky (born 21 November 1991) is a German born Canadian rugby union player who plays as a flanker or No8 representing Canada internationally. On 9 October 2019, he was called up to the Canadian squad for the 2019 Rugby World Cup as an injury replacement to Mike Sheppard.
