= Juan Cruz Mallía =

Argentine rugby union player

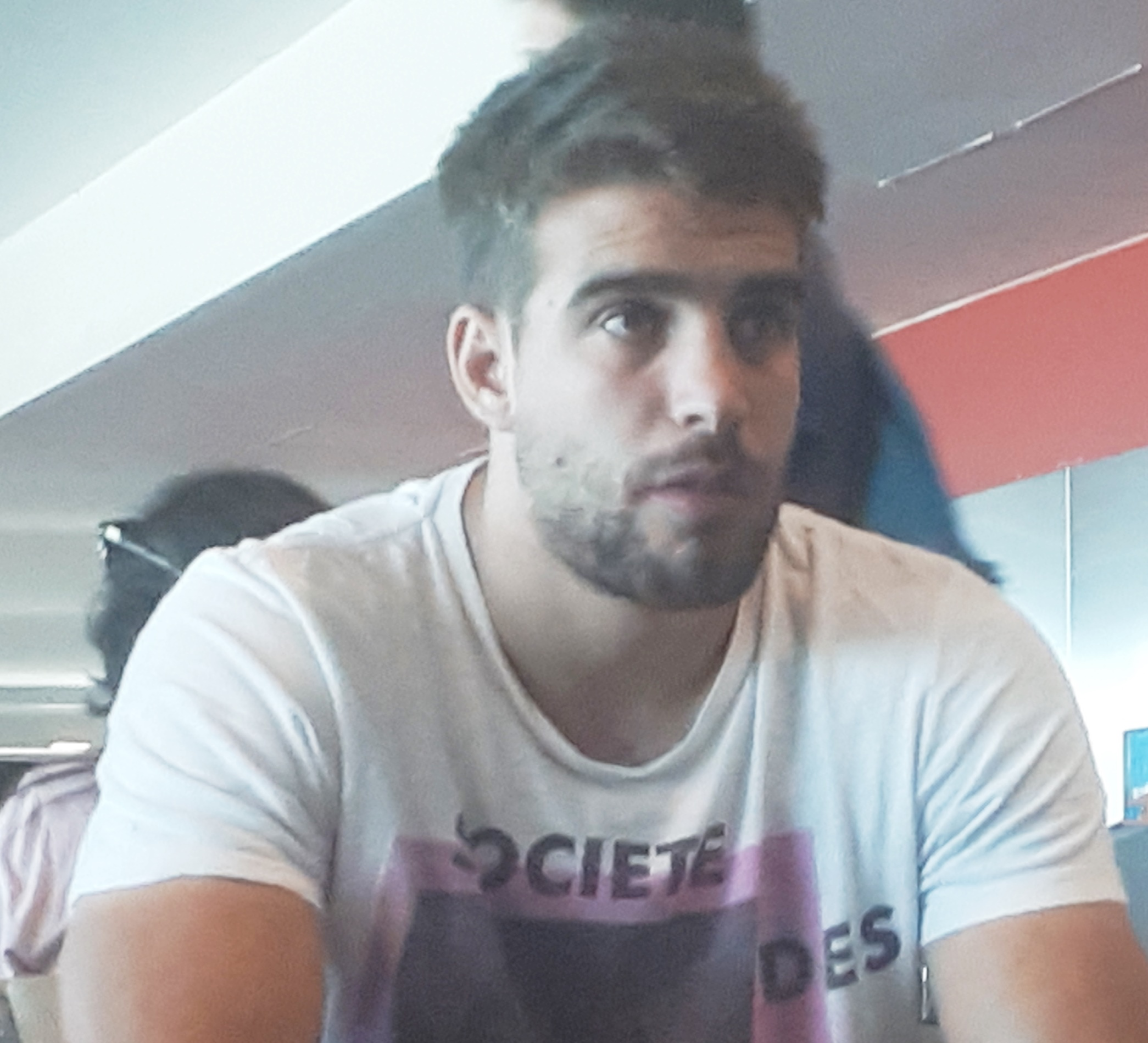
- Mallía during a private outing
- Born: 11 September 1996 (age 30) Córdoba, Argentina
- Height: 1.82 m (6 ft 0 in)
- Weight: 87.7 kg (193 lb; 13 st 11 lb)
- University: National University of Córdoba

Rugby union career
- Position(s): Fullback, Wing, Centre
- Current team: Toulouse
Senior career
| Years | Team | Apps | (Points) |
| 2018–2020 | Jaguares | 22 | (31) |
| 2020− | Toulouse | 90 | (312) |
- Correct as of 3 November 2024
International career
| Years | Team | Apps | (Points) |
| 2015−2016 | Argentina U20 | 8 | (15) |
| 2017–2018 | Argentina XV | 7 | (27) |
| 2018– | Argentina | 47 | (46) |
- Correct as of 9 November 2024

Juan Cruz Mallía (born 11 September 1996) is an Argentine professional rugby union player who plays as a fullback for Top 14 club Toulouse and the Argentina national team.

== Club career ==
Mallía can be described as a utility back, like James O'Connor or Adam Ashley-Cooper, being able to play from 10 to 15 and starting more than ten professional games in each position.

Mallía played for the Jaguares in Super Rugby. He made his Super Rugby debut against the Chiefs in May 2018.

In 2021, he won the European Rugby Champions Cup playing for Toulouse, scoring their only try in the final. A few weeks later, he won his first Top 14 title in a 18–8 win against La Rochelle in final.

== Honours ==
Jaguares XV

- 1× Currie Cup First Division: 2019

Toulouse

- 2× European Rugby Champions Cup: 2021, 2024
- 2× Top 14: 2021, 2023

Argentina XV

- 1× Americas Pacific Challenge: 2017
