= Cam Polson =

Canadian rugby union player

- Born: 20 September 1989 (age 37) London, Ontario
- Height: 6 ft 5 in (1.96 m)
- Weight: 250 lb (110 kg)
- School: Claremont Secondary School
- University: University of Victoria; Royal Military College of Canada

Rugby union career
- Position(s): Lock, Flanker
Youth career
- Velox Valhallians RFC
Amateur team(s)
Years	Team	Apps	(Points)
2016–2018	Castaway Wanderers RFC		
Senior career
Years	Team	Apps	(Points)
2018–2019	Seattle Seawolves	10	(5)
Provincial / State sides
Years	Team	Apps	(Points)
2016–2019	BC Bears		
International career
Years	Team	Apps	(Points)
2018	Canada	2	(0)

Cam Polson (born 20 September 1989) is a Canadian professional rugby union player. He plays as a second row for the Seattle Seawolves in Major League Rugby and previously for Canada internationally.
