= Ryan Kotlewski =

Canada international rugby union player

- Born: February 21, 1990 (age 36)
- Height: 6 ft 0 in (183 cm)
- Weight: 260 lb (118 kg)

Rugby union career
- Position: Prop
International career
Years	Team	Apps	(Points)
2016–19	Canada	6	(0)

Ryan Kotlewski (born February 21, 1990) is a Canadian international rugby union player.

A prop from Calgary, Alberta, Kotlewski played for Prairie Wolf Pack in the Canadian Rugby Championship and had several seasons in Australia with the Canberra Royals, where he won a ACTRU premiership in 2015.

Kotlewski relocated to Greater Victoria in 2016 and began playing his rugby with Westshore RFC.

Between 2016 and 2019, Kotlewski was a member of the Canada national team, gaining six caps.

== See also ==
- List of Canada national rugby union players
