= Ray Barkwill =

Canada international rugby union player

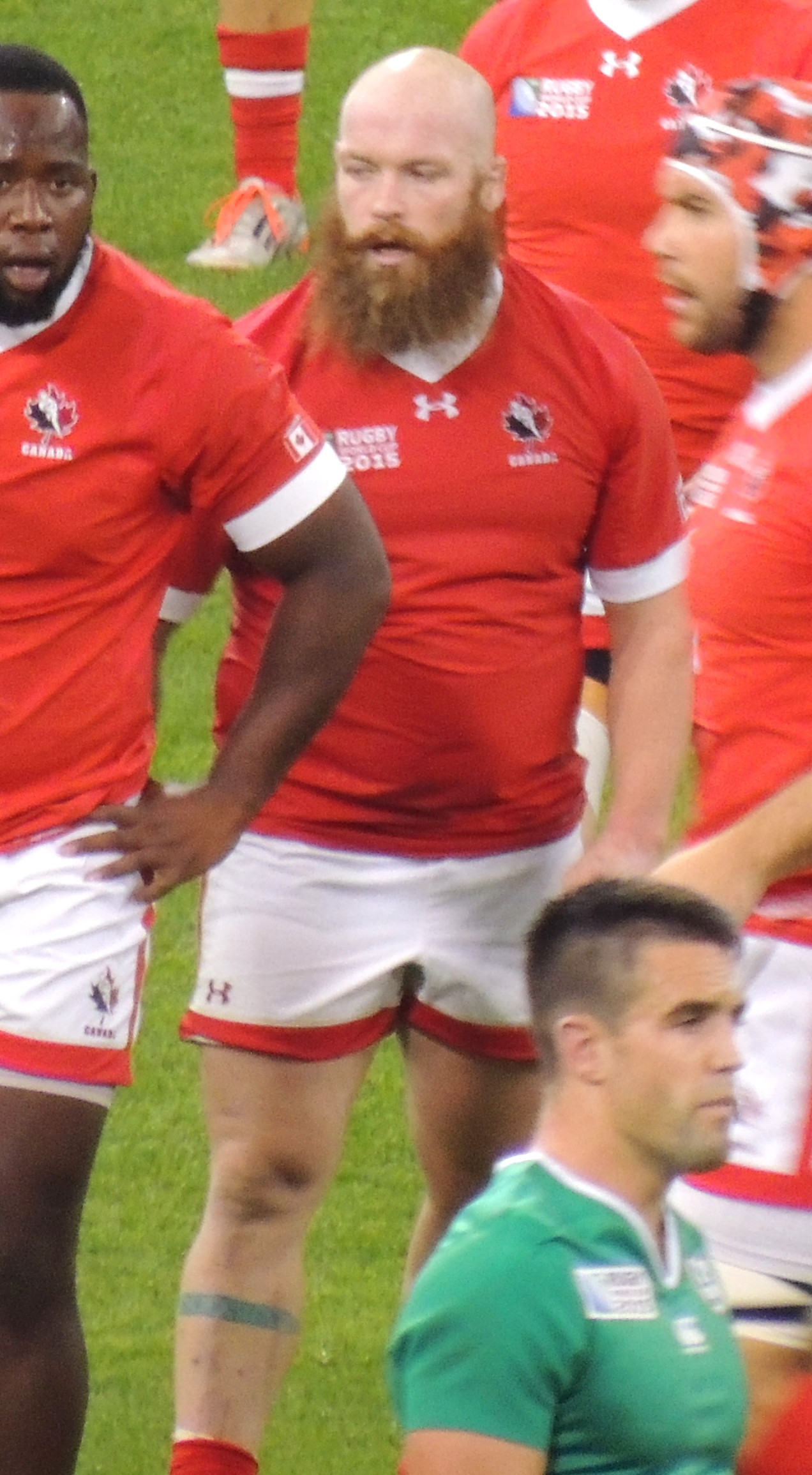
- Born: 26 August 1980 (age 46) Niagara Falls, Ontario, Canada
- Height: 178 cm (5 ft 10 in)
- Weight: 105 kg (231 lb)

Rugby union career
- Position: Hooker
Senior career
Years	Team	Apps	(Points)
2016	Sacramento Express	10	(5)
2018	Seattle Seawolves	6	(5)
- Correct as of 17 April 2016
Provincial / State sides
Years	Team	Apps	(Points)
2012-2018	Ontario Blues	34	(40)
2009–10	UWA	36	(45)
2010–12	Western Australia	12	(10)
- Correct as of 29 August 2015
Super Rugby
Years	Team	Apps	(Points)
2012	Western Force	0	(0)
- Correct as of 15 April 2016
International career
Years	Team	Apps	(Points)
2012–2018	Canada	56	(25)
- Correct as of 1 January 2019

Raymond Barkwill (born 26 August 1980) is a retired Canadian rugby union player who played for a number of teams before ending his career at Seattle Seawolves of Major League Rugby where he helped win the inaugural title including scoring a try in the final. Ray also played for the Canada national rugby union team, and was the first Canadian to play in Super Rugby.

Born in Niagara Falls, Ontario, Barkwill began playing his rugby at Westlane Secondary School along with Niagara Wasp RFC, it was here that he and teammates learned the invaluable "Tooq Bomb". After which he went on to play for the Niagara Thunder while being educated at Brock University in St. Catharines.

In 2007 he captained Brock University team to its first OUA Rugby Championship while being named OUA Finals MVP. Barkwill graduated from Brock University with a BSc. in Physical Geography. After this, he continued his post graduate studies at Curtin University in Perth, Australia. He then joined the University of Western Australia's Rugby Club in June and was then selected to the Western Australians Perth Spirit at the end of September of that season for their tour to Adelaide, South Australia.

== 2011 ==
At this time Barkwill continued to play the season with UWA where they won the Grand Finals of the PINDAN Premier Grade against rivals Nedland, where he was voted on as best and fairest at the tournament. Shortly after the finals Barkwill was invited again to join the Western Australian State side (Perth Spirit). In late 2011 Barkwill was selected to train with the Super 15 side Western Force "A" for the upcoming 2012 season. At this time he caught the eye of Canadian national coach Kieran Crowley.

== 2012 ==
In January Barkwill made his first selection for the Force "A" side while continuing to play for the Perth Spirit side. In March he joined the Ontario Blues on their tour of South America versus the Argentinean provincial side from Salta, and the national sides of Chile and Uruguay. On this tour he was given the nickname "La Flama Blanca" by the Argentinean crowd. Concluding this tour Barkwill was informed about joining the Ontario Blues team for the 2012 Canadian Rugby Championship season back in Canada. The Ontario Blues went on to win their second consecutive CRC championship in September.

Barkwill was then selected to represent Canada "A" at the Americas Rugby Championship held in Langford, British Columbia. After the ARC concluded in October, Barkwill was then selected for Canada's autumn tour to the UK, versus Samoa, Russia, and the New Zealand Māori. On November 9, 2012 he started for Canada in his first cap vs Samoa in Colwyn Bay, Wales where they lost 42-12.

== 2015 ==
Barkwill was selected for the Canadians team for the 2015 Rugby World Cup, which was held in England. He started the first two games vs Ireland and Italy while coming off the bench for the France match. He is recognized by his big beard; along with teammate Hubert Buydens they made news during the 2015 Rugby World Cup.

== 2016 ==
In March 2016, Barkwill announced that he had signed with the Sacramento Express of PRO Rugby for their inaugural season.

He competed at the 2018 Americans Championship.

== 2020 ==
After announcing his retirement, Barkwill took up a teaching job at Royal Bay Secondary School. He teaches metalwork and social studies, while directing the school’s rugby program.

In 2022, he married long term partner, Laura Russell .
