= Santiago Montagner =

Argentine rugby union player (born 1995)

- Born: 18 April 1995 (age 31) Argentina
- Height: 6 ft 2 in (1.88 m)
- Weight: 225 lb (102 kg; 16 st 1 lb)

Rugby union career
- Position: Flanker
Amateur team(s)
Years	Team	Apps	(Points)
2014-2019	Alumni	53	(100)
2023−	Alumni	9	(20)
Senior career
Years	Team	Apps	(Points)
2019	Jaguares XV	8	(10)
2020	Ceibos	2	(0)
2020−2022	Mont de Marsan	25	(0)
2022−2023	Petrarca Padova	18	(25)
Super Rugby
Years	Team	Apps	(Points)
2018–2019	Jaguares	0	(0)
- Correct as of 3 January 2018
- Correct as of 3 January 2018

Santiago Montagner (born 18 April 1995) is an Argentine rugby player who played for the national Argentina team The Pumas and Italian team Petrarca Padova in Top10. His playing position is Flanker.
