= Argentina national under-20 rugby union team =

Argentina
- Union: Argentine Rugby Union
- Nickname: Pumitas
- Emblem: Puma
- Coach: (Argentina) José Pellicena
Team kit	Change kit

First international
- Argentina 17–9 Ireland (6 June 2008)

Largest win
- Argentina 44–13 Scotland (5 June 2013)

Largest defeat
- New Zealand 60–0 Argentina (14 June 2008)

World Cup
- Appearances: 9 (First in 2008)
- Best result: 3rd, 2016, 2025

Official website
- uar.com.ar/category/pumitas/

The Argentina national under-20 rugby union team, officially nicknamed Pumitas, represents Argentina at a national level. The team plays in the World Rugby U20 Championship. It also competes at the South American Junior Championship as of 1972 and the U20 Rugby Championship since 2024.

== Squad ==
Squad to the 2015 IRB Junior World Championship

Forwards: Gaspar Baldunciel; Cristian Bartoloni; Eduardo Bello; Ignacio Calas; Ignacio Calles; José Deheza; Javier Diaz; Lucas Gasparri; Ignacio Larrague; Santiago Medrano; Santiago Montagner; Enzo Ocampo; Nicolas Ocello; Ernesto Olmedo; Benito Paolucci; Santiago Portillo; Vittorio Rosti	Backs: Eugenio Achilli; Ignacio Albornoz; Patricio Baronio; Lautaro Bazán; Emiliano Boffelli; Julián Domínguez; Bautista Ezcurra; Matias Ferro; Tomas Granella; Juan Cruz Mallia; Santiago Mare; Domingo Miotti; Santiago Resino

=== Award winners ===
The following Argentina U20s players have been recognised at the World Rugby Awards since 2008:

World Rugby Junior Player of the Year
Year	Nominees	Winners
2010	Ignacio Rodriguez Muedra	—
2019	Juan Pablo Castro	Juan Pablo Castro

=== Management ===
- Nicolas Fernandez Lobbe - Head Coach
- Galo Alvarez Quinones - Team Manager
- Ricardo Carvajal - Physiotherapist
- Carlos Cirillo - Team Doctor
- Fernando Mendonca - Trainer
- Cristian Del Castillo - Video Analyst
- Guillermo Castex - Logistics Manager
- Juan Pablo Bello - Team President

== Tournament Record ==
Year	Host	Rank
2008	Wales	8th
2009	Japan	11th
2010	Argentina	6th
2011	Italy	9th
2012	South Africa	4th
2013	France	6th
2014	New Zealand	9th
2015	Italy	9th
2016	England	3rd
