= Lautaro Bavaro =

Argentine rugby union player

- Born: Lautaro Ezequiel Bavaro Buenos Aires, Argentina
- Height: 73 in (185 cm)
- Weight: 225 lb (102 kg; 16 st 1 lb)
- University: Catholic University of Uruguay
- Occupation: Rugby union player

Rugby union career
- Position: Blindside Flanker
- Current team: Old Glory DC
Senior career
Years	Team	Apps	(Points)
2016-2019	Argentina XV		
2019-2021	Jaguares XV		
2019	Ceibos		
2023–present	Old Glory DC		

Lautaro Ezequiel Bavaro (born 9 April 1994) is an Argentine rugby union player. who currently plays for Old Glory DC in Major League Rugby (MLR) in the U.S.

== Early life ==
Bavaro was born in April 1994 in Buenos Aires, Argentina. He attended the Catholic University of Uruguay.

== Career ==
Bavaro played for the Hindú Club from 2012 onwards. He was captain of Argentina XV in the Americas Rugby Championship. He was signed to Old Glory DC for the 2023 season.
