= Angus MacLellan =

American rugby union player

- Born: Hugh Angus MacLellan II; August 24, 1992 (age 34) Traverse City, Michigan, United States
- Height: 6 ft 1 in (1.85 m)
- Weight: 245 lb (17 st 7 lb; 111 kg)

Rugby union career
- Position: Prop
Senior career
Years	Team	Apps	(Points)
2016	Ohio Aviators	9	(0)
2018–	Utah Warriors	101	(15)
- Correct as of 16 June 2025
International career
Years	Team	Apps	(Points)
2011–2012	United States U20	5	(0)
2016–2018	USA Selects	6	(5)
2016–2018	United States	5	(0)

Hugh Angus MacLellan II (born August 24, 1992) is an American rugby union player whose usual playing position is prop. He plays for the Utah Warriors in Major League Rugby (MLR) and has played for the United States national rugby union team.

== Youth ==
MacLellan was born and raised in Michigan and attended St. Francis High School. During his high school years he played with the Traverse City Alliance team.

He played his college rugby with the Davenport University Panthers. At Davenport, he captained the rugby team and led them to a national D1-AA title. MacLellan was captain of the USA Collegiate All-American Team. He also played for Trinity University in Dublin, Ireland and Linwood Rugby Club in Christchurch New Zealand.

== Professional ==
MacLellan signed with the Ohio Aviators of PRO Rugby in the spring of 2016, and was described as an emerging young player to watch. In 2025 MacLellan became the third player and first American-born player to reach 100 Major League Rugby appearances.

== International ==
MacLellan played two years with the U.S. under-20 national rugby team. MacLellan played with the USA Selects during the fall of 2014. MacLellan was named as part of the wider training group for the U.S. national team for the 2015 Rugby World Cup, but he tore his ACL, which eliminated his chances of making the U.S. roster. MacLellan debuted for the U.S. national team on April 12, 2016 during the Americas Rugby Championship, and also played for the U.S. during the 2016 mid-year internationals.
