= Ben Cima =

United States rugby union player (b. 1996)

- Born: March 20, 1996 (age 30) Buenos Aires, Argentina
- Height: 6 ft 1 in (1.85 m)
- Weight: 189 lb (86 kg)
- School: Gonzaga College
- University: University of Maryland
- Notable relative: Matias Cima (brother)

Rugby union career
- Position: Fly-Half
Amateur team(s)
Years	Team	Apps	(Points)
2015–2017	Rocky Gorge		
Senior career
Years	Team	Apps	(Points)
2018	San Diego Legion	7	(15)
2018	New England Free Jacks	1	(4)
2019–	Seattle Seawolves	28	(57)
2019	Viadana		
2020	Ohio Aviators	1	(6)
- Correct as of 13 November 2024
International career
Years	Team	Apps	(Points)
2014–2016	United States U20	8	(88)
2016–2017	USA Selects	6	(40)
2017–	United States	10	(42)
- Correct as of 25 December 2020

Benjamin Cima (born March 20, 1996) is an American rugby union player who plays fly-half for the United States men's national team. Cima also plays for the Seattle Seawolves in Major League Rugby (MLR).

Cima formerly played club rugby for Rocky Gorge and also played at the international level for the United States men's national under-20 team and the USA Selects.

== Early life ==
Ben Cima was born in Argentina, the son of former La Salle rugby player, Marcelo Cima. At the age of seven, Cima moved to the United States. Cima was named an All-American in rugby during each of his final three years in high school, and in 2014 led Gonzaga College to its first national championship in rugby at the High School National Invitational tournament.

== Club career ==
Following his high school graduation, Cima played rugby at the University of Maryland, where he was a teammate to his older brother, Matias. Cima played senior level club rugby for Rocky Gorge in Columbia, Maryland. In January 2018, Cima signed with the San Diego Legion to play in Major League Rugby's inaugural season. Cima currently plays for the Seattle Seawolves.

== International career ==
=== USA Junior All-Americans ===
Cima made his debut in international play with the United States men's national under-20 team (Junior All-Americans) in 2014 and played at the 2014 Junior World Rugby Trophy. Cima also represented the United States at the 2016 Junior World Rugby Trophy. From his tenure with the Junior All-Americans, Cima is best-known for kicking a game winning penalty goal, from beyond 50 meters in the eightieth minute of play, in a victory over Canada in a 2016 Junior World Rugby Trophy qualifying match.

=== USA Selects ===
In late 2016, Cima made his debut with the USA Selects in the 2016 World Rugby Americas Pacific Challenge. He also represented the United States in the 2017 World Rugby Americas Pacific Challenge, scoring in a defeat to Samoa, and in victories over Uruguay and Canada.

=== USA Eagles ===
Cima made his debut with the USA Eagles on February 4, 2017, starting at fly-half in the Eagles' 29–23 victory over Uruguay in the Americas Rugby Championship. Cima scored three penalty goals and one conversion in his debut.
