= Juan Cruz González (rugby union) =

Argentine rugby union player

- Born: 1 October 1992 (age 34) Argentina
- Height: 1.68 m (5 ft 6 in)
- Weight: 80 kg (180 lb; 13 st)

Rugby union career
- Position: Fly-half / Fullback
Senior career
Years	Team	Apps	(Points)
2012–2019	CUBA	128	(871)
2020	Alcobendas	2	(9)
2021–	Toronto Arrows	0	(0)
- Correct as of 31 January 2021
International career
Years	Team	Apps	(Points)
2016–2018	Argentina XV	17	(133)
- Correct as of 31 January 2021
National sevens team
Years	Team		Comps
2016	Argentina Sevens		2
- Correct as of 31 January 2021

Juan Cruz González (born 1 October 1992) is an Argentine rugby union player, currently playing for the Toronto Arrows of Major League Rugby (MLR). His preferred position is fly-half or fullback.

== Professional career ==
González signed for Major League Rugby side Toronto Arrows ahead of the 2021 Major League Rugby season. He had previously represented Argentina Sevens at two competitions in 2016.
