= 2016 Americas Rugby Championship squads =

This is a list of the complete squads for the 2016 Americas Rugby Championship, an annual rugby union tournament contested by Argentina XV, Brazil, Canada, Chile, United States and Uruguay. Argentina XV are the defending champions.

Note: Number of caps and players' ages are indicated as of 6 February 2016 – the tournament's opening day.

== Argentina XV ==
On 22 January, acting head coach for the Argentina side Pablo Bouza, named a 26-man squad for the Championship.

^{1} On 30 January, Juan Pablo Estellés replaced Franco Cuaranta in the squad following an injury sustained in training.

^{2} On 4 February, Gaspar Baldunciel was added to the squad as injury cover for Facundo Bosch following injury sustained in training.

^{3} On 7 February, 12 further players were added to the squad.

^{4} On 16 February, Marcos Bollini, Juan Cruz González and Gonzalo Paulín were named a 24-man squad for training ahead of the Uruguay fixture.

^{5} On 25 February, Jaguars players Lucas González Amorosino and Juan Manuel Leguizamón were released by the Super Rugby side for game time, while Bautista Delguy and Tomás Granella joined the squad with the Sevens player returning to the national sevens team.

^{6} On 1 March, Martín Elías, Franco Molina and Patricio Baronio were called up to the squad for the final fixture against Brazil.

Head coach: (Argentina) Pablo Bouza

Player	Position	Date of birth (age)	Caps	Club/province
Gaspar Baldunciel ^{2}	Hooker	9 December 1996 (aged 19)	0	Alumni
Facundo Bosch ^{2}	Hooker	8 August 1991 (aged 24)	0	CUBA
Ignacio Calles ^{3}	Hooker	24 June 1995 (aged 20)	0	Liceo Naval
Santiago Iglesias Valdez	Hooker	22 May 1993 (aged 22)	11	Uni. Tucumán
Axel Zapata ^{3}	Hooker	11 February 1993 (aged 22)	0	SITAS
Felipe Arregui	Prop	9 June 1994 (aged 21)	0	Duendes
Cristian Bartoloni	Prop	26 August 1995 (aged 20)	0	Pucará
Eduardo Bello ^{3}	Prop	17 November 1995 (aged 20)	0	Atlético del Rosario
Franco Brarda	Prop	22 August 1993 (aged 22)	0	Tala
Facundo Gigena ^{3}	Prop	15 September 1994 (aged 21)	0	Tala
Enrique Pieretto	Prop	14 December 1994 (aged 21)	0	Córdoba
Roberto Tejerizo	Prop	15 April 1988 (aged 27)	4	Tucumán Lawn Tennis Club
Ignacio Calas	Lock	18 March 1996 (aged 19)	0	La Tablada
Marcos Kremer	Lock	30 July 1997 (aged 18)	0	Club Atlético del Rosario
Ignacio Larrague	Lock	25 October 1995 (aged 20)	0	San Isidro
Franco Molina ^{6}	Lock	28 August 1997 (aged 18)	0	Jockey Club
Pedro Ortega	Lock	30 July 1994 (aged 21)	0	Uni. Tucumán
Rodrigo Báez	Flanker	8 February 1989 (aged 26)	16	Jaguares
Lautaro Bavaro	Flanker	4 September 1994 (aged 21)	0	Hindú
José Deheza	Flanker	12 April 1995 (aged 20)	0	Jockey Club
Juan Manuel Leguizamón ^{5}	Flanker	6 June 1983 (aged 32)	65	Jaguares
Gonzalo Paulín ^{4}	Flanker		0	Tala
Santiago Montagner	Number 8	18 April 1995 (aged 20)	0	Alumni
Santiago Portillo ^{3}	Number 8	21 November 1995 (aged 20)	0	Los Tarcos
Miguel Urtubey ^{3}	Number 8	6 April 1991 (aged 24)	0	Newman
Patricio Baronio ^{6}	Scrum-half	6 May 1996 (aged 19)	0	Newman
Lautaro Bazán Vélez	Scrum-half	24 February 1996 (aged 19)	0	Córdoba
Gonzalo Bertranou	Scrum-half	31 December 1993 (aged 22)	1	Los Tordos
Marcos Bollini ^{4}	Scrum-half	18 August 1991 (aged 24)	0	Newman
Mauro Perotti ^{3}	Scrum-half		0	Gimnasia y Tiro
Bautista Ezcurra ^{3}	Fly-half	21 April 1995 (aged 20)	0	Hindú
Juan Cruz González ^{4}	Fly-half	21 April 1995 (aged 20)	0	CUBA
Domingo Miotti	Fly-half	22 May 1996 (aged 19)	0	Tucumán Lawn Tennis Club
Juan Novillo	Fly-half	8 July 1992 (aged 23)	2	Tucumán
Santiago Álvarez Fourcade ^{3}	Centre	17 February 1994 (aged 21)	3	San Isidro
Juan Cappiello	Centre	4 March 1992 (aged 23)	3	Pucará
Martín Elías ^{6}	Centre	16 October 1996 (aged 19)	0	Atlético del Rosario
Juan Pablo Estellés ^{1}	Centre	5 May 1988 (aged 27)	1	Atlético del Rosario
Tomás Granella ^{5}	Centre	11 August 1995 (aged 20)	0	Liceo Cuyo
Joaquín Paz	Centre	11 January 1991 (aged 25)	3	Córdoba
Lucas González Amorosino ^{5}	Wing	11 February 1985 (aged 30)	49	Jaguares
Tomás Carrió	Wing	10 March 1989 (aged 26)	6	CURNE
Franco Cuaranta ^{1}	Wing	23 May 1992 (aged 23)	0	Tala
Rodrigo Etchart ^{3}	Wing	1 December 1994 (aged 21)	0	SIC
Axel Müller ^{3}	Wing	25 November 1993 (aged 22)	0	Marista
Matías Orlando	Wing	14 November 1991 (aged 24)	10	Jaguares
Bautista Delguy ^{5}	Fullback	22 April 1997 (aged 18)	0	Pucará
Pedro Mercerat	Fullback	26 February 1990 (aged 25)	0	La Plata
Ramiro Moyano	Fullback	28 May 1990 (aged 25)	6	Jaguares
Segundo Tuculet ^{3}	Fullback	5 February 1994 (aged 22)	0	Los Tilos

== Brazil ==
Brazil's 31-man squad for the Championship.

^{1} On 11 February, the uncapped Yan Machado was named in the side to face Uruguay haven not been named in the original 31-man squad.

^{2} On 18 February, Jonatas Paulo was called up to replace the Jardel Vettorato, who retired following the Uruguay fixture in round 2.

^{3} On 25 February, André Arruda, Diego López and Robert Tenório were called up to replace Cléber Dias, Mark Jackson and Lucas Muller.

^{4} On 1 March, Rafael Carnivalle and Matheus Cruz were called up to the squad, with Cruz entering the squad as an injury replacement for Stefano Giantorno.

Head Coach: (Argentina) Rodolfo Ambrosio

Note: Flags indicate national union for the club/province as defined by World Rugby.

Player	Position	Date of birth (age)	Caps	Club/province
Daniel Danielewicz	Hooker	8 August 1982 (aged 33)	8	(Brazil) Desterro
Yan Rosetti	Hooker	7 May 1993 (aged 22)	3	(Argentina) CUBA
Lucas Abud	Prop	26 August 1993 (aged 22)	7	(Brazil) SPAC
Vitor Ancina	Prop	24 November 1987 (aged 28)	1	(Brazil) Curitiba
Rafael Carnivalle ^{4}	Prop	20 April 1989 (aged 26)	1	(Brazil) SPAC
Jonatas Paulo ^{2}	Prop	14 May 1985 (aged 30)	5	(Brazil) São Paulo Saracens
Wilton Rebolo	Prop	2 August 1995 (aged 20)	2	(Brazil) São José
Caique Silva	Prop	21 November 1993 (aged 22)	2	(Argentina) CUQ
Jardel Vettorato	Prop	22 October 1985 (aged 30)	10	(Brazil) San Diego
Cleber Dias	Lock	3 July 1985 (aged 30)	1	(Brazil) Wallys
Diego López ^{3}	Lock	16 March 1987 (aged 28)	2	(Brazil) Pasteur
Lucas Piero	Lock	25 September 1991 (aged 24)	9	(Brazil) Desterro
Felipe Tissot	Lock	4 February 1988 (aged 28)	3	(Brazil) Curitiba
Luiz Gustavo Viera	Lock	14 July 1994 (aged 21)	1	(France) Oyonnax
André Arruda ^{3}	Flanker	16 March 1987 (aged 28)	0	(Brazil) Desterro
Artur Bergo	Flanker	7 March 1994 (aged 21)	1	(Brazil) SPAC
João Luiz da Ros (c)	Flanker	10 July 1982 (aged 33)	9	(Brazil) Desterro
Mark Jackson	Flanker	7 April 1987 (aged 28)	3	(Brazil) Desterro
Gabriel Paganini	Flanker	4 March 1993 (aged 22)	3	(Brazil) São Paulo Saracens
Matheus Wolf	Flanker	24 June 1995 (aged 20)	3	(Brazil) Joaca
Nick Smith	Number 8	1 May 1986 (aged 29)	7	(Brazil) SPAC
Beukes Cremer	Scrum-half	21 October 1987 (aged 28)	4	(Brazil) Pasteur
Stefano Giantorno	Scrum-half	27 September 1991 (aged 24)	2	(Argentina) San Luis
Lucas Duque	Fly-half	15 March 1984 (aged 31)	??	(Brazil) São José
David Harvey	Fly-half	20 May 1983 (aged 32)	2	(Australia) NSW Country Eagles
Robert Tenório ^{3}	Fly-half	27 July 1996 (aged 19)	0	(Brazil) Pasteur
Matheus Cruz ^{4}	Centre	24 February 1996 (aged 19)	0	(Brazil) Jacareí
Moisés Duque	Centre	21 December 1988 (aged 27)	2	(Brazil) São José
Mateus Estrela	Centre	13 November 1995 (aged 20)	3	(Brazil) Niterói
Felipe Sancery	Centre	27 May 1994 (aged 21)	0	(France) Albi
Martin Schaefer	Centre	18 October 1989 (aged 26)	6	(Brazil) São Paulo
Pedro Lopes	Wing	8 December 1992 (aged 23)	5	(Brazil) São José
Yan Machado ^{1}	Wing		0	(Brazil) Curitiba
Lucas Muller	Wing	13 February 1990 (aged 25)	2	(Brazil) Desterro
Daniel Sancery	Wing	27 May 1994 (aged 21)	0	(France) Albi
Lucas Tranquez	Wing	12 March 1994 (aged 21)	11	(Brazil) SPAC
Laurent Bourda-Couhet	Fullback	12 July 1994 (aged 21)	1	(Brazil) São Paulo Saracens
Guilherme Coghetto	Fullback	2 May 1992 (aged 23)	6	(Brazil) Farrapos

== Canada ==
On 26 January, Canada’s interim Senior Men’s head coach Francois Ratier, named a 28-man squad for the Championship.

^{1} Following the signing of Evan Olmstead to London Scottish post-squad announcement, Kyle Gilmour was called up to the squad as his replacement.

^{2} On 18 February, Joe Dolesau and Brock Staller were named in the team to face Brazil haven been called after the United States fixture.

Head coach: (France) Francois Ratier

Note: Flags indicate national union for the club/province as defined by World Rugby.

Player	Position	Date of birth (age)	Caps	Club/province
Ray Barkwill	Hooker	26 August 1980 (aged 35)	26	(Canada) Ontario Blues
Eric Howard	Hooker	5 September 1993 (aged 22)	0	(Canada) Ontario Blues
Alex Mascott	Hooker	25 October 1993 (aged 22)	0	(Canada) BC Bears
Rob Brouwer	Prop	10 December 1982 (aged 33)	0	(Canada) Ontario Blues
Hubert Buydens (c)	Prop	4 January 1982 (aged 34)	39	(Canada) Prairie Wolf Pack
Jake Ilnicki	Prop	24 February 1992 (aged 23)	9	(Canada) BC Bears
Ryan Kotlewski	Prop	21 February 1990 (aged 25)	0	(Canada) Prairie Wolf Pack
Djustice Sears-Duru	Prop	24 May 1994 (aged 21)	12	(Canada) Ontario Blues
Kyle Baillie	Lock	7 April 1991 (aged 24)	0	(Canada) Atlantic Rock
Liam Chisholm	Lock	7 April 1991 (aged 24)	0	(Canada) BC Bears
Paul Ciulini	Lock	28 October 1995 (aged 20)	0	(Canada) Ontario Blues
Callum Morrison	Lock	28 November 1985 (aged 30)	3	(Canada) BC Bears
Evan Olmstead ^{1}	Lock	21 February 1991 (aged 24)	7	(England) London Scottish
Alistair Clark	Flanker	4 July 1987 (aged 28)	0	(Canada) Ontario Blues
Kyle Gilmour ^{1}	Flanker	26 January 1988 (aged 28)	14	(England) Rotherham Titans
Clay Panga	Flanker	6 July 1985 (aged 30)	0	(Canada) Prairie Wolf Pack
Lucas Rumball	Flanker	2 August 1995 (aged 20)	0	(Canada) Ontario Blues
Michael Hamson	Number 8	6 March 1988 (aged 27)	0	(Canada) Atlantic Rock
Andrew Ferguson	Scrum-half	1 May 1992 (aged 23)	0	(Canada) Ontario Blues
Gordon McRorie	Scrum-half	12 May 1988 (aged 27)	15	(Canada) Prairie Wolf Pack
Jake Robinson	Scrum-half	3 June 1988 (aged 27)	0	(Canada) Prairie Wolf Pack
Gradyn Bowd	Fly-half	27 August 1992 (aged 23)	0	(Canada) Prairie Wolf Pack
Pat Parfrey	Fly-half	1 November 1991 (aged 24)	7	(Canada) Atlantic Rock
Nick Blevins	Centre	11 November 1988 (aged 27)	28	(Canada) Prairie Wolf Pack
Joe Dolesau ^{2}	Centre		0	(Canada) BC Bears
Mozac Samson	Centre	1 September 1985 (aged 30)	0	(Canada) Prairie Wolf Pack
Brock Staller ^{2}	Centre		0	(Canada) BC Bears
Phil Mackenzie	Wing	25 February 1987 (aged 28)	31	(England) Sale Sharks
Duncan Maguire	Wing	2 January 1989 (aged 27)	2	(Canada) Prairie Wolf Pack
Dan Moor	Wing	24 July 1990 (aged 25)	0	(Canada) Ontario Blues
Brett Johnson	Fullback	6 August 1994 (aged 21)	0	(Canada) Atlantic Rock

== Chile ==
Chile's 26-man squad for the Championship.

^{1} On 11 February, Felipe Bassaletti, Matthieu Manas and Nicolás Venegas were added to the squad ahead of the Argentine fixture.

^{2} On 18 February, Ińaki Gurruchaga was named in the squad ahead of the United States fixture.

^{3} On 26 February, Roberto Oyarzún was named in the squad ahead of the Uruguay fixture.

Head Coach: (Chile) Elías Santillán

Note: Flags indicate national union for the club/province as defined by World Rugby.

Player	Position	Date of birth (age)	Caps	Club/province
Tomás Dussaillant	Hooker	26 April 1986 (aged 29)	0	(Chile) Old Boys
Rodrigo Moya	Hooker	30 September 1982 (aged 33)	0	(Chile) PWCC
José Ramón Ayarza	Prop	28 August 1993 (aged 22)	4	(France) La Voulte-Valence
Sergio de La Fuente	Prop	31 July 1986 (aged 29)	48	(New Zealand) Mid Western Northland
Ińaki Gurruchaga ^{2}	Prop	31 October 1995 (aged 20)	0	(Chile) Old Johns
José Tomás Munita	Prop	11 August 1992 (aged 23)	4	(Chile) Católica
Roberto Oyarzún^{3}	Prop	15 March 1987 (aged 28)	10	(New Zealand) Waipu
Luis Sepúlveda	Prop	13 July 1982 (aged 33)	6	(Chile) Los Troncos
Nicolás Venegas ^{1}	Prop	11 January 1986 (aged 30)	3	(Chile) Stade Français
Claudio Zamorano	Prop	8 January 1989 (aged 27)	9	(Chile) Stade Français
Ignacio Alvárez	Lock	23 July 1988 (aged 27)	5	(Chile) COBS
Felipe Bassaletti ^{1}	Lock	13 December 1984 (aged 31)	0	(Argentina) Paraná
Matías Cabrera	Lock	31 October 1987 (aged 28)	6	(Spain) Complutense Cisneros
Raimundo Piwonka	Lock	7 December 1986 (aged 29)	1	(Chile) PWCC
Cristobál Niedmann	Flanker	9 December 1992 (aged 23)	15	(Chile) PWCC
Nikola Bursic	Flanker	12 August 1993 (aged 22)	4	(Chile) COBS
Javier Richard	Flanker	25 February 1991 (aged 24)	4	(Chile) COBS
Ignacio Silva	Flanker	16 February 1989 (aged 26)	14	(Chile) Stade Français
Benjamín Soto (c)	Number 8	26 August 1987 (aged 28)	15	(Chile) Stade Français
Matthieu Manas ^{1}	Scrum-half	6 July 1989 (aged 26)	2	(Chile) Stade Français
Juan Pablo Perrotta	Scrum-half	9 May 1987 (aged 28)	22	(Chile) U. Católica
Beltrán Vergara	Scrum-half	25 December 1990 (aged 25)	0	(Chile) Old Boys
Cristian Onetto	Fly-half	11 February 1983 (aged 32)	59	(Chile) COBS
Francisco de La Fuente	Centre	23 May 1988 (aged 27)	12	(France) Stade Bagnérais
José Ignacio Larenas	Centre	14 September 1989 (aged 26)	11	(Chile) U. Católica
Matías Nordenflycht	Centre	2 October 1994 (aged 21)	6	(Chile) COBS
Matías Contreras	Wing	28 December 1994 (aged 21)	5	(Chile) Alumni
Leonardo Montoya	Wing	5 August 1986 (aged 29)	2	(France) Stade Rouennais
Italo Zunino	Wing	16 June 1992 (aged 23)	8	(Chile) COBS
Pablo Casas	Fullback	4 March 1992 (aged 23)	1	(Chile) PWCC
Humberto Chacaltana	Fullback	23 June 1986 (aged 29)	0	(Chile) U. Católica

== United States ==
On 29 January, United States head coach John Mitchell, named a 37-man squad for the Championship.

^{1} On 9 February, Nate Brakeley and Aaron Davis were added to the squad ahead of the Canada fixture.

^{2} On 17 February, Lorenzo Thomas and Deion Mikesell were added to the squad ahead of the Chile fixture, haven impressed for the U20's team a week earlier.

^{3} On 25 February, James King and Andrew Suniula were added to the squad ahead of the South American matches against Brazil and Uruguay.

Head coach: (New Zealand) John Mitchell

Note: Flags indicate national union for the club/province as defined by World Rugby.

Player	Position	Date of birth (age)	Caps	Club/province
Cam Falcon	Hooker	August 18, 1993 (aged 22)	0	(United States) New Orleans
James Hilterbrand	Hooker	May 21, 1989 (aged 26)	0	Unattached
Mike Sosene-Feagai	Hooker	April 17, 1993 (aged 22)	0	(United States) Belmont Shore
Chris Baumann	Prop	May 18, 1987 (aged 28)	7	(United States) Austin RC
Demecus Beach	Prop	December 28, 1987 (aged 28)	0	(United States) Life University
Eric Fry	Prop	September 14, 1987 (aged 28)	36	(England) Newcastle Falcons
Olive Kilifi	Prop	September 28, 1986 (aged 29)	15	(United States) Seattle Saracens
Titi Lamositele	Prop	February 11, 1995 (aged 20)	16	(England) Saracens
Joe Taufete'e	Prop	October 4, 1992 (aged 23)	1	(United States) Belmont Shore
Cam Dolan	Lock	March 7, 1990 (aged 25)	20	(Wales) Cardiff Blues
Ben Landry	Lock	March 26, 1991 (aged 24)	0	(United States) Seattle Saracens
Brodie Orth	Lock		0	(United States) Kansas City Blues
Greg Peterson	Lock	March 26, 1991 (aged 24)	11	(Scotland) Glasgow Warriors
Pat Blair	Flanker	January 27, 1990 (aged 26)	0	(United States) USA Sevens
Nate Brakeley ^{1}	Flanker	August 31, 1989 (aged 26)	0	(United States) NYAC
Hanco Germishuys	Flanker	August 24, 1996 (aged 19)	0	(United States) Glendale Raptors
Alec Gletzer	Flanker	October 10, 1991 (aged 24)	0	(United States) Olympic Club
James King ^{3}	Flanker	March 16, 1987 (aged 28)	0	(Japan) Yakult Levins
Aladdin Schirmer	Flanker	December 31, 1992 (aged 23)	0	(United States) Central Washington Wildcats
Bruce Thomas	Flanker	June 8, 1987 (aged 28)	0	(United States) SFGG
Todd Clever	Number 8	January 16, 1983 (aged 33)	63	(England) Newcastle Falcons
David Tameilau	Number 8	January 22, 1990 (aged 26)	0	(United States) Life West Gladiators
Matt Trouville	Number 8	June 9, 1986 (aged 29)	5	(United States) Seattle Saracens
Tom Bliss	Scrum-half	March 12, 1993 (aged 22)	0	(England) Wasps
Niku Kruger	Scrum-half	October 9, 1991 (aged 24)	2	(United States) Glendale Raptors
James Bird	Fly-half	January 14, 1989 (aged 27)	0	(United States) Old Blue
JP Eloff	Fly-half	May 28, 1991 (aged 24)	0	(United States) Chicago Lions
Mike Te'o	Fly-half	July 23, 1993 (aged 22)	0	(United States) USA Sevens
Aaron Davis ^{1}	Centre		0	(United States) Tiger Rugby
Lemoto Filikitonga	Centre	May 25, 1993 (aged 22)	0	(United States) Metropolis RFC
Mike Garrity	Centre	January 11, 1989 (aged 27)	0	(United States) Seattle Saracens
Chad London	Centre	September 27, 1988 (aged 27)	1	(United States) Glendale Raptors
Andrew Suniula ^{3}	Centre	May 1, 1982 (aged 33)	38	(Romania) București
Lorenzo Thomas ^{2}	Centre	January 22, 1997 (aged 19)	0	(United States) Lindenwood Lions
Nick Edwards	Wing	February 24, 1984 (aged 31)	0	(United States) USA Sevens
Luke Hume	Wing	January 26, 1988 (aged 28)	17	(United States) Old Blue
Ryan Matyas	Wing	December 24, 1990 (aged 25)	0	(United States) Old Blue
Deion Mikesell ^{2}	Wing		0	(United States) Lindenwood Lions
Kingsley McGowan	Wing	December 18, 1992 (aged 23)	0	(Republic of Ireland) Trinity
Takudzwa Ngwenya	Wing	July 22, 1985 (aged 30)	35	(France) Biarritz
Tim Stanfill	Wing	April 7, 1989 (aged 26)	4	(United States) Seattle Saracens
Jake Anderson	Fullback	January 22, 1992 (aged 24)	0	(United States) Olympic Club
Blaine Scully	Fullback	February 29, 1988 (aged 27)	29	(Wales) Cardiff Blues

== Uruguay ==
Uruguay's initial 24-man squad for the Championship. Additional players will be added to the team throughout the Championship

^{1} On 8 February, Ignacio Dotti, Federico Favaro and the uncapped trio of Lukas Lacoste, Ignacio Secco and Martín Secco were called up ahead of the Brazil fixture.

^{2} On 17 February, Fernando Bascou, Facundo Klappenbach, Juan Diego Ormaechea and Andrés Rocco were named in the team to face Argentina in round 3.

Head Coach: (Argentina) Esteban Meneses

Note: Flags indicate national union for the club/province as defined by World Rugby.

Player	Position	Date of birth (age)	Caps	Club/province
Carlos Arboleya	Hooker	23 July 1985 (aged 30)	54	(Uruguay) Trébol de Paysandú
Germán Kessler	Hooker	1 July 1994 (aged 21)	13	(Uruguay) Los Cuervos
Rodolfo de Mula	Prop	18 March 1985 (aged 30)	24	(Uruguay) Pucaru Stade Gaulois
Juan Echeverría	Prop	9 October 1991 (aged 24)	10	(Uruguay) Old Christians
Facundo Gattas	Prop	2 July 1995 (aged 20)	0	(Uruguay) Lobos
Rafael Mones	Prop	12 January 1994 (aged 22)	0	(Uruguay) Seminario
Mateo Sanguinetti	Prop	26 July 1992 (aged 23)	18	(Uruguay) Los Cuervos
Ignacio Secco ^{1}	Prop		0	(Uruguay) Trébol de Paysandú
Ignacio Dotti ^{1}	Lock	18 August 1994 (aged 21)	4	(Uruguay) Los Cuervos
Franco Lamanna	Lock	5 October 1991 (aged 24)	25	(Uruguay) Carrasco Polo
Mathias Palomeque	Lock	7 October 1986 (aged 29)	26	(Uruguay) Trébol de Paysandú
Gonzalo Soto	Lock	10 February 1995 (aged 20)	0	(Uruguay) Carrasco Polo
Fernando Bascou ^{2}	Flanker	5 April 1987 (aged 28)	26	(Uruguay) Pucaru Stade Gaulois
Matías Beer	Flanker	16 December 1993 (aged 22)	15	(Uruguay) Old Christians
Lukas Lacoste ^{1}	Flanker		0	(Uruguay) Trébol de Paysandú
Diego Magno	Flanker	27 April 1989 (aged 26)	51	(Uruguay) Montevideo Cricket
Juan Manuel Gaminara (c)	Flanker	1 May 1989 (aged 26)	27	(Uruguay) Old Boys
Juan Diego Ormaechea ^{2}	Flanker	28 January 1989 (aged 27)	12	(Uruguay) Carrasco Polo
Alejandro Nieto	Number 8	7 January 1988 (aged 28)	31	(Uruguay) Champagnat
Santiago Arata	Scrum-half		0	(Uruguay) Pucaru Stade Gaulois
Guillermo Lijtenstein	Scrum-half	14 September 1990 (aged 25)	15	(Uruguay) Trébol de Paysandú
Manuel Blengio	Fly-half	28 April 1994 (aged 21)	11	(Uruguay) Old Christians
Martín Secco ^{1}	Fly-half		0	(Uruguay) Los Cuervos
Rodrigo Silva	Fly-half	2 November 1992 (aged 23)	18	(Uruguay) Carrasco Polo
Pedro Deal	Centre	13 October 1994 (aged 21)	3	(Uruguay) Old Boys
Facundo Klappenbach ^{2}	Centre	9 June 1995 (aged 20)	0	(Uruguay) Champagnat
Alberto Román	Centre	1 June 1987 (aged 28)	37	(Uruguay) Pucaru Stade Gaulois
Andrés Vilaseca	Centre	8 May 1991 (aged 24)	16	(Uruguay) Old Boys
Leandro Leivas	Wing	6 July 1988 (aged 27)	44	(Uruguay) Old Christians
Federico Favaro ^{1}	Wing	19 May 1991 (aged 24)	9	(Uruguay) Old Christians
Santiago Martinez	Wing	15 June 1993 (aged 22)	1	(Uruguay) Carrasco Polo
Andrés Rocco ^{2}	Wing	29 June 1994 (aged 21)	0	(Uruguay) Old Boys
Gastón Mieres	Fullback	5 October 1989 (aged 26)	41	(England) Coventry
