= 2017 Americas Rugby Championship squads =

This is a list of the complete squads for the 2017 Americas Rugby Championship, an annual rugby union tournament contested by Argentina XV, Brazil, Canada, Chile, United States and Uruguay. Argentina XV are the defending champions.

Note: Number of caps and players' ages are indicated as of 3 February 2017 – the tournament's opening day.

== Argentina XV ==
Argentina XV 31-man for the 2017 Americas Rugby Championship.

^{1} With only one scrum half named in the squad, Juan Manuel Lescano was later added to the team.

^{2} Jaguares player Ignacio Larrague and Lautaro Bazán were called up to the squad ahead of the second round.

^{3} On 15 February Germán Schulz was drafted into the squad from the Pumas 7's side.

^{4} On 22 February, Emiliano Boffelli and Facundo Gigena were released by their Super Rugby side to gain game time after injury.

^{5} Gabriel Ascárate was released by his Super Rugby side to gain game time after injury.

Head Coach: (Argentina) Felipe Contepomi

Player	Position	Date of birth (age)	Caps	Club/province
Gaspar Baldunciel	Hooker	9 December 1996 (aged 20)	0	Alumni
Marcelo Brandi	Hooker	18 August 1989 (aged 27)	0	Newman
Axel Zapata	Hooker	11 February 1993 (aged 23)	0	SITAS
Cristian Bartoloni	Prop	26 August 1995 (aged 21)	2	Pucará
Eduardo Bello	Prop	17 November 1995 (aged 21)	1	Atlético del Rosario
Franco Brarda	Prop	22 August 1993 (aged 23)	1	Tala
Alejo Brem	Prop	14 October 1992 (aged 24)	0	Los Tilos
Francisco Ferronato	Prop	8 January 1988 (aged 29)	0	Belgrano
Facundo Gigena ^{4}	Prop	15 September 1994 (aged 22)	1	Jaguares
Santiago Medrano	Prop	6 May 1996 (aged 20)	0	Regatas Bella Vista
Nicolás Solveyra	Prop	10 March 1995 (aged 21)	0	CUBA
Juan Cruz Guillemaín	Lock	21 August 1992 (aged 24)	1	Jockey Club de San Juan
Ignacio Larrague ^{2}	Lock	25 October 1995 (aged 21)	2	Jaguares
Franco Molina	Lock	28 August 1997 (aged 19)	0	Jockey Club Córdoba
Pedro Ortega	Lock	30 July 1994 (aged 22)	2	Uni. Tucumán
Lautaro Bavaro (c)	Flanker	4 September 1994 (aged 22)	2	Hindú
Tomás de la Vega	Flanker	28 September 1990 (aged 26)	12	CUBA
Francisco Gorrissen	Flanker	30 August 1994 (aged 22)	0	Belgrano
Mariano Romanini	Flanker	23 February 1996 (aged 20)	0	Alumni
Rodrigo Bruni	Number 8	3 September 1993 (aged 23)	0	San Luis
Santiago Montagner	Number 8	18 April 1995 (aged 21)	0	Alumni
Lautaro Bazán Vélez ^{2}	Scrum-half	24 February 1996 (aged 20)	0	Córdoba
Sebastián Cancelliere	Scrum-half	17 September 1993 (aged 23)	2	Hindú
Juan Manuel Lescano ^{1}	Scrum-half	17 September 1993 (aged 23)	1	Atlético del Rosario
Juan Cruz González	Fly-half	21 April 1995 (aged 21)	0	CUBA
Domingo Miotti	Fly-half	22 May 1996 (aged 20)	0	Tucumán Lawn Tennis Club
Santiago Álvarez	Centre	17 January 1994 (aged 23)	0	San Isidro
Gabriel Ascárate ^{5}	Centre	20 October 1987 (aged 29)	19	Jaguares
Juan Cappiello	Centre	4 March 1992 (aged 24)	3	Pucará
Bruno Devoto	Centre	7 March 1992 (aged 24)	2	San Isidro
Tomás Granella	Centre	11 August 1995 (aged 21)	1	Liceo Cuyo
Emiliano Boffelli ^{4}	Wing	16 January 1995 (aged 22)	0	Jaguares
Franco Cuaranta	Wing	23 May 1992 (aged 24)	2	Tala
Julián Domínguez	Wing	4 October 1996 (aged 20)	0	Pucará
Fernando Luna	Wing	12 May 1990 (aged 26)	0	Córdoba
Germán Schulz ^{3}	Wing	5 February 1994 (aged 22)	2	Tala
Bautista Delguy	Fullback	22 April 1997 (aged 19)	0	Pucará
Segundo Tuculet	Fullback	5 February 1994 (aged 22)	1	Los Tilos

== Brazil ==
Brazil's initial 26-man squad ahead of their opening game against Chile.

^{1} Caíque Silva and Pedro Bengaló, who is uncapped, were called up to the squad ahead of Brazil's clash against the United States.

^{2} Cléber Dias, Ariel Rodrigues, Robert Tenório and Endy Willian were added to the squad ahead of the third round game against Uruguay.

^{3} Gabriel Paganini was added to the squad ahead of Brazil playing Argentina XV in round 4.

^{4} Luan Almeida, Lucas Duque and Luca Tranquez were added to the squad ahead of the final round.

Head Coach: (Argentina) Rodolfo Ambrosio

Player	Position	Date of birth (age)	Caps	Club/province
Luan Almeida ^{4}	Hooker	28 December 1994 (aged 22)	2	(Brazil) Jacareí
Daniel Danielewicz	Hooker	8 August 1982 (aged 34)	12	(Brazil) Desterro
Yan Rosetti	Hooker	7 May 1993 (aged 23)	13	(Argentina) CUBA
Endy Willian ^{2}	Hooker	26 May 1995 (aged 21)	0	(Brazil) Curitiba
Alexandre Alves	Prop	23 July 1996 (aged 20)	2	(Brazil) Desterro
Vitor Ancina	Prop	24 November 1987 (aged 29)	4	(Brazil) Curitiba
Pedro Bengaló ^{1}	Prop	14 October 1995 (aged 21)	0	(Brazil) Desterro
Jonatas Paulo	Prop	14 May 1985 (aged 31)	11	(Brazil) São Paulo Saracens
Wilton Rebolo	Prop	2 August 1995 (aged 21)	9	(Brazil) São José
Matheus Rocha	Prop		0	(Brazil) Jacareí
Caíque Silva ^{1}	Prop	21 November 1993 (aged 23)	8	(Brazil) Niterói
Diego López	Lock	16 March 1987 (aged 29)	7	(Brazil) Pasteur
Gabriel Paganini ^{3}	Lock	4 March 1993 (aged 23)	5	(Brazil) Bandeirantes
Lucas Piero	Lock	25 September 1991 (aged 25)	19	(Brazil) Desterro
Felipe Tissot	Lock	4 February 1988 (aged 28)	4	(Brazil) Curitiba
Luiz Gustavo Viera	Lock	14 July 1994 (aged 22)	7	(France) Villefranche
André Arruda	Flanker	16 March 1987 (aged 29)	3	(Brazil) Desterro
Artur Bergo	Flanker	7 March 1994 (aged 22)	5	(Brazil) SPAC
João Luiz da Ros	Flanker	10 July 1982 (aged 34)	18	(Brazil) Desterro
Matheus Daniel	Flanker	19 June 1990 (aged 26)	9	(Brazil) Jacareí
Cléber Dias ^{2}	Flanker	3 July 1995 (aged 21)	8	(Brazil) Wallys
Nick Smith (c)	Number 8	1 May 1986 (aged 30)	18	(Brazil) SPAC
Beukes Cremer	Scrum-half	21 October 1987 (aged 29)	13	(Brazil) Poli
Matheus Cruz	Scrum-half	24 February 1996 (aged 20)	1	(Brazil) Jacareí
Lucas Duque ^{4}	Scrum-half	15 March 1984 (aged 32)	10	(Brazil) São José
Guilherme Coghetto	Fly-half	2 May 1992 (aged 24)	12	(Brazil) Desterro
Josh Reeves	Fly-half	7 August 1990 (aged 26)	0	(Brazil) Jacareí
Moisés Duque	Centre	21 December 1988 (aged 28)	13	(Brazil) São José
Felipe Sancery	Centre	27 May 1994 (aged 22)	12	(Brazil) São José
Luan Smanio	Centre	27 August 1993 (aged 23)	1	(Brazil) Desterro
Stefano Giantorno	Wing	27 September 1991 (aged 25)	10	(Brazil) Niteroí
Ariel Rodrigues ^{2}	Wing		0	(Brazil) Jacareí
Robert Tenório ^{2}	Wing	27 July 1996 (aged 20)	4	(Brazil) Pasteur
Luca Tranquez ^{4}	Wing	12 March 1994 (age 32)	12	(Brazil) SPAC
De Wet van Niekerk	Wing		0	(Brazil) São Paulo Saracens
Daniel Sancery	Fullback	27 May 1994 (aged 22)	12	(Brazil) São José

== Canada ==
On 23 January, Anscombe named an extended squad of 29 players ahead of the 2017 Americas Rugby Championship.

^{1} On 16 February, Lucas Albornoz was called up to the squad as injury cover for Matt Beukeboom.

^{2} On 22 February, English based player Brett Beukeboom joined the squad ahead of playing Uruguay, while Kainoa Lloyd earned his first call up as cover for Taylor Paris.

Head Coach: (New Zealand) Mark Anscombe

Player	Position	Date of birth (age)	Caps	Club/province
Ray Barkwill	Hooker	26 August 1980 (aged 36)	36	(Canada) Ontario Blues
Eric Howard	Hooker	5 September 1993 (aged 23)	6	(Canada) Ontario Blues
Benoit Piffero	Hooker	21 May 1987 (aged 29)	10	(France) Blagnac
Rob Brouwer	Prop	10 December 1989 (aged 27)	5	(Canada) Ontario Blues
Cole Keith	Prop	11 July 1997 (aged 19)	0	(Canada) Atlantic Rock
Ryan Kotlewski	Prop	21 February 1990 (aged 26)	2	(Canada) Prairie Wolf Pack
Djustice Sears-Duru	Prop	24 May 1994 (aged 22)	22	(Scotland) Glasgow Warriors
Matt Tierney	Prop	4 July 1996 (aged 20)	2	(France) Pau
Brett Beukeboom ^{2}	Lock	13 August 1990 (aged 26)	22	(England) Cornish Pirates
Matt Beukeboom	Lock	3 April 1997 (aged 19)	0	(France) Pau Academy
Liam Chisholm	Lock	7 April 1991 (aged 25)	2	(Canada) BC Bears
Conor Keys	Lock	9 July 1996 (aged 20)	0	(Canada) Atlantic Rock
Reegan O'Gorman	Lock	7 May 1996 (aged 20)	0	(New Zealand) Marist Albion
Lucas Albornoz ^{1}	Flanker	29 April 1991 (aged 25)	0	(Canada) Prairie Wolf Pack
Admir Cejvanovic	Flanker	26 June 1990 (aged 26)	3	(Canada) BC Bears
Oliver Nott	Flanker	26 May 1995 (aged 21)	0	(Canada) BC Bears
Lucas Rumball	Flanker	2 August 1995 (aged 21)	8	(Canada) Ontario Blues
Clay Panga	Number 8	1 January 1985 (aged 32)	5	(Canada) Prairie Wolf Pack
Phil Mack	Scrum-half	18 September 1985 (aged 31)	34	(Canada) BC Bears
Gordon McRorie	Scrum-half	12 May 1988 (aged 28)	23	(Canada) Prairie Wolf Pack
Gradyn Bowd	Fly-half	27 August 1992 (aged 24)	4	(Canada) Prairie Wolf Pack
Pat Parfrey	Fly-half	1 November 1991 (aged 25)	15	(Canada) Atlantic Rock
Robbie Povey	Fly-half	21 September 1996 (aged 20)	0	(England) Bedford Athletic
Giuseppe du Toit	Fly-half	29 July 1995 (aged 21)	0	(Canada) BC Bears
George Barton	Centre	27 September 1997 (aged 19)	0	(France) Clermont Espoirs
Nick Blevins	Centre	11 November 1988 (aged 28)	37	(Canada) Prairie Wolf Pack
Conor Trainor	Centre	5 December 1989 (aged 27)	25	(France) Vannes
Kainoa Lloyd ^{2}	Wing	21 May 1994 (aged 22)	1	(Canada) Ontario Blues
Dan Moor	Wing	24 July 1990 (aged 26)	7	(Canada) Ontario Blues
Taylor Paris ^{2}	Wing	6 October 1992 (aged 24)	18	(France) Agen
Rory McDonell	Fullback	17 August 1988 (aged 28)	0	(Canada) Ontario Blues
Brock Staller	Fullback	24 March 1992 (aged 24)	3	(Canada) BC Bears
Carl Pocock	Fullback	5 August 1984 (aged 32)	0	(Canada) Prairie Wolf Pack

== Chile ==
Chile's 36-man squad for the 2017 Americas Rugby Championship.

^{1} On 8 February Martín Mendoza was called up as injury cover for Tomás Dussaillant.

^{2} Nelson Calderón and Sebastián Valech were called up ahead of the third round match against Argentina XV.

^{3} Ernesto Ugarte was called up to the squad on 21 February as injury cover for Gonzalo Martínez, while Matías Contreras returned to the squad after recovering from injury.

Head Coach: (France) Bernard Charreyre

Player	Position	Date of birth (age)	Caps	Club/province
Tomás Dussaillant	Hooker	26 April 1986 (aged 30)	6	(Chile) Old Boys
Manuel Gurruchaga	Hooker	3 April 1983 (aged 33)	11	(Chile) COBS
Martín Mendoza ^{1}	Hooker	7 August 1995 (aged 21)	0	(Chile) Sporting RC
Rodrigo Moya	Hooker	30 September 1982 (aged 34)	4	(Chile) PWCC
Lucas Bordigoni	Prop		1	(Chile) Viña
Vittorio Lastra	Prop	26 March 1996 (aged 20)	0	(Chile) Old Mackayans
Gonzalo Martínez ^{3}	Prop	13 September 1989 (aged 27)	0	(Argentina) Curuaytí
José Tomás Munita	Prop	11 August 1992 (aged 24)	9	(Chile) Universidad Católica
Ernesto Ugarte ^{3}	Prop	24 April 1989 (aged 27)	0	(Chile) Old John’s
Sebastián Valech ^{2}	Prop	25 December 1987 (aged 29)	3	(Chile) Old Boys
Claudio Zamorano (c)	Prop	8 January 1989 (aged 28)	8	(Chile) Stade Français
Nikola Bursic	Lock	12 August 1993 (aged 23)	11	(Chile) COBS
Nelson Calderón ^{2}	Lock	10 December 1978 (aged 38)	6	(Chile) Los Troncos
Mario Mayol	Lock	12 July 1994 (aged 22)	7	(Chile) Old Boys
Manuel Dagnino	Flanker	11 October 1991 (aged 25)	3	(Chile) Old Mackayans
Cristobál Niedmann	Flanker	9 December 1992 (aged 24)	11	(Chile) PWCC
Eduardo Orpis	Flanker	8 June 1995 (aged 21)	1	(Chile) COBS
Arturo Seeman	Flanker	29 March 1994 (aged 22)	0	(Chile) Old Georgians
Nicanor Machuca	Number 8	28 March 1993 (aged 23)	0	(Chile) Old Reds
Anton Petrowitsch	Number 8	20 October 1994 (aged 22)	4	(Chile) COBS
Benjamín Soto	Number 8	26 August 1987 (aged 29)	19	(Chile) Stade Français
Sergio Bascuñán	Scrum-half	1 April 1993 (aged 23)	4	(Chile) Old Mackayans
Jan Hasenlechner	Scrum-half	30 May 1994 (aged 22)	5	(Chile) COBS
Beltrán Vergara	Scrum-half	25 December 1990 (aged 26)	9	(Chile) Old Boys
Francisco Cruz	Fly-half	20 April 1983 (aged 33)	3	(Chile) COBS
Jorge Castillo	Fly-half	23 June 1993 (aged 23)	1	(Chile) ARUA
Francisco González Moller	Fly-half	9 April 1988 (aged 28)	5	(Chile) Sporting RC
José Ignacio Larenas	Centre	14 September 1989 (aged 27)	13	(Chile) Universidad Católica
Matías Nordenflycht	Centre	2 October 1994 (aged 22)	13	(Chile) COBS
Simón Pardakhty	Centre	5 June 1991 (aged 25)	4	Unattached
Ricardo Sifri	Centre	6 February 1988 (aged 28)	3	(Chile) Universidad Católica
Mauricio Urrutia	Centre	9 January 1990 (aged 27)	3	(Chile) Sporting RC
Matías Contreras ^{3}	Wing	28 December 1994 (aged 22)	8	(Chile) Alumni
Martín Fernández	Wing	9 August 1994 (aged 22)	4	(Chile) COBS
Tomás Ianiszewski	Wing	15 May 1992 (aged 24)	2	(Chile) Old Locks
Juan Pablo Larenas	Wing	1 June 1992 (aged 24)	5	(Chile) Universidad Católica
Franco Velarde	Wing	4 November 1994 (aged 22)	0	(Chile) Viña
Pedro Verschae	Wing	25 October 1990 (aged 26)	7	(Chile) Viña
Martín Verschae	Wing	20 May 1992 (aged 24)	2	(Chile) Viña
Rodrigo Fernández	Fullback	8 February 1996 (aged 20)	5	(Chile) COBS
Francisco Urroz	Fullback	7 September 1993 (aged 23)	1	(Chile) Old Reds

== United States ==
America's 35-man squad for the 2017 Americas Rugby Championship.

^{1} Spike Davies and Peter Tiberio were called up to the squad ahead of the second round game against Brazil.

Head Coach: (New Zealand) John Mitchell

Player	Position	Date of birth (age)	Caps	Club/province
James Hilterbrand	Hooker	21 May 1989 (aged 27)	5	(Australia) Manly
Peter Malcolm	Hooker	30 August 1993 (aged 23)	0	(United States) Ohio Aviators
Chris Baumann	Prop	18 May 1987 (aged 29)	13	(United States) Denver Stampede
Demecus Beach	Prop	28 December 1987 (aged 29)	2	(United States) Ohio Aviators
Anthony Purpura	Prop	11 November 1986 (aged 30)	1	(United States) Boston Rugby Club
Olive Kilifi	Prop	28 September 1986 (aged 30)	19	(United States) Sacramento Express
Ben Tarr	Prop	17 March 1994 (aged 22)	4	(United States) Denver Stampede
Alex Maughan	Prop	24 April 1995 (aged 21)	0	(United States) Life University
Dino Waldren	Prop	11 July 1991 (aged 25)	0	Unattached
Nate Brakeley	Lock	31 August 1989 (aged 27)	6	(United States) NYAC
Nick Civetta	Lock	5 November 1989 (aged 27)	2	(England) Newcastle Falcons
Matt Jensen	Lock	21 April 1992 (aged 24)	0	(United States) Brigham Young University
Siaosi Mahoni	Lock	29 January 1997 (aged 20)	0	Unattached
John Quill	Flanker	10 March 1990 (aged 26)	17	(United States) Sacramento Express
Todd Clever (c)	Flanker	16 January 1983 (aged 34)	69	(United States) Austin Huns
Hanco Germishuys	Flanker	24 August 1996 (aged 20)	1	(United States) Austin Huns
Tony Lamborn	Flanker	31 July 1991 (aged 25)	3	(New Zealand) Hawke's Bay
Alastair McFarland	Flanker	2 June 1989 (aged 27)	11	(United States) NYAC
David Tameilau	Number 8	22 January 1990 (aged 27)	4	(France) RC Narbonne
Cam Dolan	Number 8	7 March 1990 (aged 26)	23	(Wales) Cardiff Blues
Nate Augspurger	Scrum-half	31 January 1990 (aged 27)	4	(United States) Old Blue
Shaun Davies	Scrum-half	21 June 1989 (aged 27)	1	(United States) Ohio Aviators
AJ MacGinty	Fly-half	26 February 1990 (aged 26)	10	(England) Sale Sharks
Ben Cima	Fly-half	20 March 1996 (aged 20)	0	(United States) Rocky Gorge
Will Magie	Fly-half	23 February 1992 (aged 24)	0	(United States) Denver Stampede
JP Eloff	Centre	28 May 1991 (aged 25)	5	(United States) Ohio Aviators
Ryan Matyas	Centre	24 December 1990 (aged 26)	2	(United States) Old Blue
Bryce Campbell	Centre	21 September 1994 (aged 22)	1	(United States) Indiana Hoosiers
Peter Tiberio ^{1}	Centre	26 April 1989 (aged 27)	0	(United States) Seattle Saracens
Calvin Whiting	Centre	30 November 1995 (aged 21)	0	(United States) Brigham Young University
Spike Davis ^{1}	Wing	20 June 1989 (aged 27)	1	(United States) Ohio Aviators
Spike Davis	Wing	20 June 1989 (aged 27)	0	(United States) Ohio Aviators
Zack Test	Wing	13 October 1989 (aged 27)	6	(United States) USA Sevens
Luke Hume	Wing	26 January 1988 (aged 29)	20	(United States) Old Blue
Andrew Turner	Wing	24 March 1993 (aged 23)	0	Unattached
Blaine Scully (c)	Fullback	29 February 1988 (aged 28)	33	(Wales) Cardiff Blues
Mike Te'o	Fullback	23 July 1993 (aged 23)	7	(United States) San Diego Breakers

== Uruguay ==
Uruguay's initial squad for the 2017 Americas Rugby Championship.

^{1} Manuel Diana, Lucas Durán, Martín Espiga, Nicolás Freitas and Ignacio García were call called up to the squad ahead of the second round game against Argentina XV.

^{2} Juan Manuel Gaminara, Mario Sagario and Andrés Vilaseca returned to the squad after recovering from injury, while Lorenzo Surraco joined the squad ahead of the third round clash with Brazil.

^{3} Ahead of round 4, Gastón Mieres returned to the team after recovering from a shoulder injury.

Head Coach: (Argentina) Esteban Meneses

Player	Position	Date of birth (age)	Caps	Club/province
Martín Espiga ^{1}	Hooker	21 February 1985 (aged 31)	28	(Uruguay) Old Christians
Facundo Gattas	Hooker	2 July 1995 (aged 21)	12	(Uruguay) Lobos
Diego Pombo	Hooker	5 April 1993 (aged 23)	0	(Uruguay) Old Boys
Matías Benítez	Prop	6 May 1988 (aged 28)	6	(Uruguay) Champagnat
Juan Echeverría	Prop	9 October 1991 (aged 25)	19	(Uruguay) Old Christians
Felipe Inciarte	Prop		0	(Uruguay) Old Christians
Mario Sagario ^{2}	Prop	29 June 1986 (aged 30)	57	(Uruguay) Carrasco Polo
Mateo Sanguinetti	Prop	26 July 1992 (aged 24)	31	(Uruguay) Los Cuervos
Diego Ayala	Lock	27 February 1989 (aged 27)	6	(Uruguay) MVCC
Ignacio Dotti	Lock	18 August 1994 (aged 22)	13	(Uruguay) Los Cuervos
Franco Lamanna	Lock	5 October 1991 (aged 25)	32	(Italy) Pro Recco
Diego Magno	Lock	27 April 1989 (aged 27)	64	(Uruguay) MVCC
Lorenzo Surraco ^{2}	Lock	13 September 1996 (aged 20)	0	(Uruguay) Old Christians
Juan Manuel Gaminara ^{2}	Flanker	1 May 1989 (aged 27)	37	(Uruguay) Old Boys
Rodolfo Garese	Flanker	7 April 1994 (aged 22)	0	(Uruguay) Carrasco Polo
Juan Diego Ormaechea	Flanker	28 January 1989 (aged 28)	16	(Uruguay) Carrasco Polo
Gonzalo Soto	Flanker	10 February 1995 (aged 21)	8	(Uruguay) Carrasco Polo
Manuel Diana ^{1}	Number 8	4 March 1996 (aged 20)	0	(Uruguay) Old Christians
Alejandro Nieto (c)	Number 8	7 January 1988 (aged 29)	43	(Uruguay) Champagnat
Santiago Arata	Scrum-half	2 September 1996 (aged 20)	10	(Uruguay) Old Christians
Guillermo Lijtenstein	Scrum-half	14 September 1990 (aged 26)	29	(Uruguay) Trébol de Paysandú
German Albanell	Fly-half	6 January 1989 (aged 28)	3	(Uruguay) Old Boys
Lucas Durán ^{1}	Fly-half	22 July 1996 (aged 20)	0	(Uruguay) Trébol de Paysandú
Francisco Berchesi	Fly-half	12 July 1994 (aged 22)	0	(Uruguay) Carrasco Polo
Juan Manuel Cat	Centre	6 September 1996 (aged 20)	2	(Uruguay) Old Boys
Juan de Freitas	Centre	13 December 1989 (aged 27)	41	(Uruguay) Champagnat
Andrés Vilaseca ^{2}	Centre	8 May 1991 (aged 25)	25	(Uruguay) Old Boys
Nicolás Freitas ^{1}	Wing	3 July 1993 (aged 23)	12	(Argentina) Jaguares
Gastón Gibernau	Wing	15 June 1993 (aged 23)	6	(Uruguay) Old Boys
Leandro Leivas	Wing	6 July 1988 (aged 28)	52	(Uruguay) Old Christians
Andrés Rocco	Wing	29 June 1994 (aged 22)	7	(Uruguay) Old Boys
Ignacio García ^{1}	Fullback		0	(Uruguay) Pucaru Stade Gaulois
Gastón Mieres ^{3}	Fullback	5 October 1989 (aged 27)	43	(Uruguay) Lobos
Rodrigo Silva	Fullback	2 November 1992 (aged 24)	29	(Uruguay) Carrasco Polo
