= 2018 Americas Rugby Championship squads =

This is a list of the complete squads for the 2018 Americas Rugby Championship, an annual rugby union tournament contested by Argentina XV, Brazil, Canada, Chile, United States and Uruguay. Argentina XV are the defending champions.

Note: Number of caps and players' ages are indicated as of 27 January 2018 – the tournament's opening day.

== Argentina XV ==
Argentina XV squad for the 2018 Americas Rugby Championship.

^{1} Following the start of the Super Rugby, Contepomi called up players as cover for their professional contingent.

Head coach: (Argentina) Felipe Contepomi

Player	Position	Date of birth (age)	Caps	Club/province
Gaspar Baldunciel	Hooker	9 December 1996 (aged 21)	0	Alumni
Diego Fortuny	Hooker	9 December 1996 (aged 21)	0	Jaguares
Axel Zapata	Hooker	11 February 1993 (aged 24)	0	SITAS
Franco Brarda	Prop	22 August 1993 (aged 24)	1	Jaguares
Javier Díaz	Prop	26 July 1995 (aged 22)	0	Jaguares
Benjamín Espinal	Prop	19 March 1991 (aged 26)	0	Belgrano
Lucas Favre	Prop	20 November 1996 (aged 21)	0	Lomas
Francisco Ferronato	Prop	8 January 1988 (aged 30)	0	Belgrano
Nicolás Leiva	Prop		0	Jaguares
Santiago Medrano	Prop	6 May 1996 (aged 21)	0	Regatas Bella Vista
Juan Pablo Zeiss	Prop	2 August 1989 (aged 28)	0	Jaguares
Diego Galetto	Lock	28 July 1992 (aged 25)	0	Urú Curé
Ignacio Larrague	Lock	25 October 1995 (aged 22)	2	CASI
Franco Molina	Lock	28 August 1997 (aged 20)	0	Jockey Córdoba
Jerónimo Ureta	Lock	14 October 1996 (aged 21)	0	Newman
Lautaro Bavaro (c)	Flanker	4 September 1994 (aged 23)	0	Hindú
Francisco Gorrissen	Flanker	30 August 1994 (aged 23)	0	Belgrano
Santiago Montagner	Flanker	18 April 1995 (aged 22)	0	Jaguares
Mariano Romanini	Flanker	23 February 1996 (aged 21)	0	Alumni
Nicolás Sbrocco	Flanker		0	Uni Tucumán
Rodrigo Bruni	Number 8	3 September 1993 (aged 24)	0	Jaguares
Tomás de la Vega	Number 8	28 September 1990 (aged 27)	12	CUBA
Santiago Portillo	Number 8	21 November 1995 (aged 22)	0	Los Tarcos
Gregorio del Prete	Scrum-half	24 March 1995 (aged 22)	1	San Luis
Felipe Ezcurra^{1}	Scrum-half	15 April 1993 (aged 24)	3	Jaguares
Luca Magnasco	Scrum-half		0	Alumni
Facundo Nogueira	Scrum-half		0	Marabunta
Martín Elías	Fly-half	16 October 1996 (aged 21)	0	Atlético del Rosario
Juan Cruz González	Fly-half	1 October 1992 (aged 25)	0	CUBA
Tomás Granella	Fly-half	11 August 1995 (aged 22)	0	Liceo Cuyo
Juan Cappiello	Centre	4 March 1992 (aged 25)	3	Pucará
Juan Cruz Mallía	Centre	11 September 1996 (aged 21)	0	Jockey Córdoba
Lucas Mensa	Centre		0	Pucará
Santiago Resino	Centre	21 April 1995 (aged 22)	0	Uni Tucumán
Tomás Videla	Centre	20 September 1994 (aged 23)	0	Liceo Cuyo
Santiago Álvarez^{1}	Wing	17 February 1994 (aged 23)	3	CASI
[[Julián Domínguez {{{last}}} (rugby union)|Julián Domínguez {{{last}}}]]	Wing	4 October 1996 (aged 21)	0	Pucará
Rodrigo Etchart	Wing	12 January 1994 (aged 24)	0	San Isidro
Tomás Malanos	Wing	4 July 1997 (aged 20)	0	Atlético del Rosario
Germán Schulz	Wing	5 February 1994 (aged 23)	3	Tala
Gastón Arias	Fullback	5 January 1994 (aged 24)	0	San Isidro
Bautista Delguy	Fullback	22 April 1997 (aged 20)	0	Jaguares

== Brazil ==
Brazil's 26-man squad for the 2018 Americas Rugby Championship.

^{1} After recovering from injury, Endy Willian rejoined the squad ahead of the second round.

^{2} After recovering from injury, Stefano Giantorno joined the squad for the final two rounds, whilst Daniel Lima joined the squad as injury cover.

Head coach: (Argentina) Rodolfo Ambrosio

Note: Flags indicate national union for the club/province as defined by World Rugby.

Player	Position	Date of birth (age)	Caps	Club/province
Yan Rosetti (c)	Hooker	7 May 1993 (aged 24)	25	(Argentina) CUBA
Wilton Rebolo	Hooker	2 August 1995 (aged 22)	14	(Brazil) Bandeirantes
Endy Willian^{1}	Hooker	26 May 1995 (aged 22)	3	(Brazil) Curitiba
Lucas Abud	Prop	26 August 1993 (aged 24)	20	(Brazil) Poli
Michel Gomes	Prop	9 April 1997 (aged 20)	2	(Brazil) São José
Matheus Rocha	Prop	15 August 1997 (aged 20)	6	(Brazil) Jacareí
Jardel Vettorato	Prop	22 August 1985 (aged 32)	12	(Brazil) Farrapos
Cléber Dias	Lock	3 July 1995 (aged 22)	17	(Brazil) Poli
Diego López	Lock	16 March 1987 (aged 30)	11	(Brazil) Pasteur
Gabriel Paganini	Lock	4 March 1993 (aged 24)	11	(Brazil) Bandeirantes
Lucas Piero	Lock	25 September 1991 (aged 26)	30	(Brazil) Desterro
Arthur Bergo	Flanker	7 March 1994 (aged 23)	13	(Brazil) SPAC
Matheus Daniel	Flanker	19 June 1990 (aged 27)	17	(Brazil) Jacareí
Angelo Marcucci	Flanker	15 January 1990 (aged 28)	0	(Brazil) Farrapos
Michael Moraes	Flanker	10 September 1991 (aged 26)	2	(Brazil) Curitiba
André Arruda	Number 8	9 January 1989 (aged 29)	17	(Brazil) Desterro
Laurent Bourda-Couhet	Scrum-half	12 July 1994 (aged 23)	15	(Brazil) Bandeirantes
Will Broderick	Scrum-half	17 September 1992 (aged 25)	1	(Brazil) Bandeirantes
Daniel Lima^{2}	Scrum-half		0	(Brazil) Rio Branco
Leonardo Ceccarelli	Fly-half	1 April 1998 (aged 19)	1	(Brazil) Jacareí
Josh Reeves	Fly-half	7 August 1990 (aged 27)	13	(Brazil) Bandeirantes
Moisés Duque	Centre	21 December 1988 (aged 29)	26	(Brazil) São José
Felipe Sancery	Centre	27 May 1994 (aged 23)	25	(Brazil) São José
Jacobus de Wet van Niekerk	Centre	25 March 1994 (aged 23)	12	(Brazil) Poli
Stefano Giantorno^{2}	Wing	27 September 1991 (aged 26)	17	(Brazil) São José
Lucas Muller	Wing	13 February 1990 (aged 27)	8	(Brazil) Desterro
Ariel Rodrigues	Wing	7 September 1998 (aged 19)	3	(Brazil) Jacareí
Robert Tenório	Wing	27 July 1996 (aged 21)	11	(Brazil) Pasteur
Lucas Tranquez	Fullback	12 March 1994 (aged 23)	18	(Brazil) São José

== Canada ==
Canada's 35-man extended squad ahead of Canada's 2019 RWC Qualifiers against Uruguay (doubles up as ARC Round 1) and for the remaining ARC rounds post qualification matches.

^{1} Following the conclusion of the RWC Qualifiers between Canada and Uruguay, Canada called up players to cover the professional players returning to their European clubs.

^{2} Jones added Ryan Kotlewski and Cam Polson to the squad for the final two rounds.

^{3} Noah Barker was a late call up to the fourth round games against Argentina XV.

^{4}Josh Thiel was added for the final round as injury cover.

Head coach: (Wales) Kingsley Jones

Note: Flags indicate national union for the club/province as defined by World Rugby.

Player	Position	Date of birth (age)	Caps	Club/province
Noah Barker^{3}	Hooker	20 August 1992 (aged 25)	0	(Canada) BC Bears
Ray Barkwill	Hooker	26 August 1980 (aged 37)	45	(United States) Seattle Seawolves
Martial Lagain	Hooker	6 January 1987 (aged 31)	0	(Canada) Atlantic Rock
Benoît Piffero	Hooker	21 May 1987 (aged 30)	18	(France) Blagnac
Hubert Buydens	Prop	4 January 1982 (aged 36)	45	(United States) New Orleans Gold
Jake Ilnicki	Prop	24 February 1992 (aged 25)	23	(England) Newcastle Falcons
Cole Keith	Prop	7 May 1997 (aged 20)	4	(Canada) Atlantic Rock
Ryan Kotlewski^{2}	Prop	21 February 1990 (aged 27)	3	(Canada) Prairie Wolf Pack
Anthony Luca	Prop	26 February 1985 (aged 32)	5	(Canada) BC Bears
Djustice Sears-Duru	Prop	24 May 1994 (aged 23)	33	(England) Ealing Trailfinders
Matt Tierney	Prop	4 July 1996 (aged 21)	12	(France) Pau
Brett Beukeboom	Lock	13 August 1990 (aged 27)	29	(England) Cornish Pirates
Conor Keys^{1}	Lock	9 July 1996 (aged 21)	4	(Canada) Atlantic Rock
Josh Larsen	Lock	4 April 1994 (aged 23)	3	(New Zealand) Northland
Evan Olmstead	Lock	21 February 1991 (aged 26)	19	(England) Newcastle Falcons
Kyle Baillie	Flanker	7 April 1991 (aged 26)	14	(England) London Scottish
Luke Campbell	Flanker	10 February 1992 (aged 25)	0	(Canada) BC Bears
Dustin Dobravsky	Flanker	21 November 1991 (aged 26)	0	(Canada) BC Bears
Matt Heaton	Flanker	9 February 1992 (aged 25)	12	(England) Darlington Mowden Park
Cam Polson^{2}	Flanker		0	(United States) Seattle Seawolves
Lucas Rumball	Flanker	2 August 1995 (aged 22)	14	(Canada) Ontario Blues
Tyler Ardron	Number 8	16 June 1991 (aged 26)	26	(New Zealand) Chiefs
Admir Cejvanovic	Number 8	26 June 1990 (aged 27)	10	(Canada) BC Bears
Andrew Ferguson	Scrum-half	1 May 1992 (aged 25)	6	(Canada) Ontario Blues
Phil Mack	Scrum-half	18 September 1985 (aged 32)	44	(United States) Seattle Seawolves
Gordon McRorie	Scrum-half	12 May 1988 (aged 29)	30	(Canada) Prairie Wolf Pack
Shane O'Leary	Fly-half	3 December 1993 (aged 24)	4	(England) Ealing Trailfinders
Pat Parfrey	Fly-half	1 November 1991 (aged 26)	18	(Canada) Atlantic Rock
Robbie Povey^{1}	Fly-half	21 September 1996 (aged 21)	3	(Canada) Prairie Wolf Pack
Nick Blevins	Centre	11 November 1988 (aged 29)	44	(Canada) Prairie Wolf Pack
Connor Braid	Centre	31 May 1990 (aged 27)	25	(Canada) BC Bears
Giuseppe du Toit	Centre	29 July 1995 (aged 22)	8	(Canada) BC Bears
Doug Fraser	Centre	5 August 1992 (aged 25)	0	(Canada) BC Bears
Ben LeSage	Centre	24 November 1995 (aged 22)	2	(Canada) Prairie Wolf Pack
Cole Davis^{1}	Wing	6 July 1997 (aged 20)	0	(Canada) Prairie Wolf Pack
Jeff Hassler	Wing	21 August 1991 (aged 26)	17	(Wales) Ospreys
Kainoa Lloyd	Wing	21 May 1994 (aged 23)	3	(Canada) Ontario Blues
Dan Moor	Wing	24 July 1990 (aged 27)	14	(England) Oxford University
Taylor Paris	Wing	6 October 1992 (aged 25)	24	(France) Castres Olympique
D. T. H. van der Merwe	Wing	28 April 1986 (aged 31)	47	(England) Newcastle Falcons
Brock Staller	Fullback	24 March 1992 (aged 25)	10	(Canada) BC Bears
Josh Thiel^{4}	Fullback	2 June 1997 (aged 20)	0	(Canada) Abbotsford RFC

== Chile ==
Chile's 45-man extended squad for the 2018 Americas Rugby Championship.

^{1} Nicolás Garafulic was a late addition to the training squad ahead of the ARC.

Head coach: (New Zealand) Mark Cross

Note: Flags indicate national union for the club/province as defined by World Rugby.

Player	Position	Date of birth (age)	Caps	Club/province
Tomás Dussaillant	Hooker	26 April 1986 (aged 31)	14	(Chile) Old Boys
Ignacio Guajardo	Hooker	13 August 1991 (aged 26)	3	(Chile) Old Mackayans
Rodrigo Moya	Hooker	30 September 1982 (aged 35)	7	(Chile) PWCC
Basilio Díaz	Prop		0	(Chile) COBS
Marco Díaz	Prop		3	(Chile) Old Mackayans
Claudio Iturra	Prop		0	(Chile) Stade Français
Vittorio Lastra	Prop	26 March 1996 (aged 21)	11	(Italy) Valsugana RC
José Tomás Munita	Prop	11 August 1992 (aged 25)	22	(Chile) Universidad Católica
Sebastián Otero	Prop		1	(Chile) Los Troncos
Claudio Zamorano	Prop	8 January 1989 (aged 29)	14	(Chile) Stade Français
Bastián Burguener	Lock		3	(Chile) Sporting RC
Nikola Bursic	Lock	12 August 1993 (aged 24)	23	(United States) New Orleans Gold
Javier Eissmann	Lock		0	(Chile) Universidad Católica
Allan Guiloff	Lock	15 December 1989 (aged 28)	1	(Chile) Old Boys
Mario Mayol	Lock	12 July 1994 (aged 23)	20	(Chile) Old Boys
Raimundo Piwonka	Lock	7 December 1986 (aged 31)	11	(Chile) PWCC
Iñaki de Urruticoechea	Flanker		0	(Chile) COBS
Alfonso Escobar	Flanker	17 August 1997 (aged 20)	0	(Chile) COBS
Nicolás Garafulic^{1}	Flanker	11 September 1998 (aged 19)	0	(Chile) COBS
Thomas Orchard	Flanker	12 January 1997 (aged 21)	0	(Chile) Old Lions
Eduardo Orpis	Flanker	8 June 1995 (aged 22)	4	(Chile) COBS
Anton Petrowitsch	Flanker	20 October 1994 (aged 23)	17	(Portugal) AA Coimbra
Javier Richard	Flanker	25 February 1991 (aged 26)	15	(Chile) COBS
Axel Scheel	Flanker	21 September 1992 (aged 25)	0	(Chile) Old Johns
Manuel Dagnino	Number 8	11 October 1991 (aged 26)	10	(Chile) Old Mackayans
Adriano Razeto	Number 8	10 October 1998 (aged 19)	0	(Chile) Old Locks
Benjamín Soto	Number 8	26 August 1987 (aged 30)	29	(Chile) Stade Français
Hermes Didier	Scrum-half		0	(Chile) Old Johns
Juan Pablo Perrotta	Scrum-half	9 May 1987 (aged 30)	16	(Chile) Universidad Católica
Domingo Saavedra	Scrum-half	15 December 1997 (aged 20)	2	(Chile) Old Boys
Beltrán Vergara	Scrum-half	25 December 1990 (aged 27)	15	(Chile) Old Boys
José Tomás Baraona	Fly-half	2 July 1992 (aged 25)	0	(Chile) Universidad Católica
Benjamín Pizarro	Fly-half	25 October 1984 (aged 33)	2	(Chile) Universidad Católica
Santiago Videla	Fly-half	16 January 1998 (aged 20)	4	(Chile) Old Boys
Lucca Avelli	Centre	23 August 1997 (aged 20)	0	(Chile) PWCC
Francisco de la Fuente	Centre	23 May 1988 (aged 29)	13	(Spain) Barcelona
José Ignacio Larenas	Centre	14 September 1989 (aged 28)	23	(Chile) Universidad Católica
Javier Lavanderos	Centre		2	(Chile) Sporting RC
Diego Ramírez	Centre	2 October 1997 (aged 20)	0	(Chile) Old Georgians
Matías Balbontíns	Wing	7 November 1991 (aged 26)	3	(Chile) Old Mackayans
Martín Raddatz	Wing	1 March 1996 (aged 21)	1	(Chile) COBS
Mauricio Urrutia	Wing	9 January 1990 (aged 28)	9	(Chile) Sporting RC
Franco Velarde	Wing	4 November 1994 (aged 23)	11	(Spain) Barcelona
Ítalo Zunino	Wing	16 June 1992 (aged 25)	9	(Chile) COBS
Tomás Ianiszewski	Fullback	15 May 1992 (aged 25)	13	(Chile) Old Locks
José Tomás Maturana	Fullback		0	(Chile) Old Boys

== United States ==
On 4 January 2018, newly appointed head coach Gary Gold announced a 39-man squad for the 2018 Americas Rugby Championship.

^{1} Chris Baumann rejoined the squad following his recovering stint with his club in Europe.

Head coach: (South Africa) Gary Gold

Note: Flags indicate national union for the club/province as defined by World Rugby.

Player	Position	Date of birth (age)	Caps	Club/province
Dylan Fawsitt	Hooker	July 28, 1990 (aged 27)	0	(United States) Old Blue
James Hilterbrand	Hooker	May 21, 1989 (aged 28)	13	(Australia) Manly
Peter Malcolm	Hooker	August 30, 1993 (aged 24)	9	(United States) Austin Elite
Joe Taufete'e	Hooker	October 4, 1992 (aged 25)	13	(England) Worcester Warriors
Chris Baumann^{1}	Prop	May 18, 1987 (aged 30)	20	(England) Leicester Tigers
Titi Lamositele	Prop	February 11, 1995 (aged 22)	20	(England) Saracens
Angus MacLellan	Prop	August 24, 1992 (aged 25)	2	(United States) Chicago Lions
Huluholo Moungaloa	Prop	December 13, 1989 (aged 28)	2	(United States) Life West
Tony Purpura	Prop	November 11, 1986 (aged 31)	8	(United States) Old Blue
Paddy Ryan	Prop	December 11, 1990 (aged 27)	4	(United States) Austin Elite
Dino Waldren	Prop	July 11, 1991 (aged 26)	9	(England) London Scottish
Chance Wenglewski	Prop	April 9, 1997 (aged 20)	0	(United States) Lindenwood Lions
Nate Brakeley	Lock	August 31, 1989 (aged 28)	13	(United States) NYAC
Nick Civetta	Lock	November 5, 1989 (aged 28)	10	(England) Newcastle Falcons
Brendan Daly	Lock	December 20, 1990 (aged 27)	0	(United States) SFGG
Matthew Jensen	Lock	April 21, 1992 (aged 25)	5	(United States) Glendale Raptors
Ben Landry	Lock	March 26, 1991 (aged 26)	8	(United States) Utah Warriors
Malon Al-Jiboori	Flanker	January 8, 1997 (aged 21)	0	(United States) USA Sevens
Hanco Germishuys	Flanker	August 24, 1996 (aged 21)	2	(United States) Austin Elite
Tony Lamborn	Flanker	July 31, 1991 (aged 26)	12	(New Zealand) Hawke's Bay
Aladdin Schirmer	Flanker	December 31, 1992 (aged 25)	2	(United States) Seattle Seawolves
Psalm Wooching	Flanker	January 16, 1994 (aged 24)	0	(United States) Seattle Saracens
Cam Dolan	Number 8	March 7, 1990 (aged 27)	30	(United States) Old Blue
Nate Augspurger	Scrum-half	January 31, 1990 (aged 27)	14	(United States) Old Blue
Shaun Davies	Scrum-half	June 20, 1989 (aged 28)	11	(United States) Glendale Raptors
Ruben de Haas	Scrum-half	October 9, 1998 (aged 19)	0	(South Africa) Free State Cheetahs Academy
Devereaux Ferris	Scrum-half	October 24, 1994 (aged 23)	0	(United States) Life West
Ben Cima	Fly-half	March 20, 1996 (aged 21)	7	(United States) San Diego Legion
Will Magie	Fly-half	February 23, 1992 (aged 25)	9	(United States) Glendale Raptors
Will Hooley	Fly-half	November 28, 1993 (aged 24)	0	(England) Bedford Blues
Dylan Audsley	Centre	January 15, 1994 (aged 24)	0	(United States) San Diego Legion
Marcel Brache	Centre	October 15, 1987 (aged 30)	7	(Australia) Perth Spirit
Bryce Campbell	Centre	September 21, 1994 (aged 23)	11	(United States) Glendale Raptors
Paul Lasike	Centre	June 18, 1990 (aged 27)	0	(United States) Utah Warriors
Alex Elkins	Wing	August 27, 1990 (aged 27)	0	Unattached
Ryan Matyas	Wing	December 24, 1990 (aged 27)	8	(United States) San Diego Legion
Blaine Scully	Wing	February 29, 1988 (aged 29)	36	(Wales) Cardiff Blues
Peni Tagive	Wing	October 3, 1988 (aged 29)	0	(United States) USA Sevens
Josh Whippy	Wing	October 30, 1990 (aged 27)	0	(United States) Utah Warriors
Mike Te'o	Fullback	July 23, 1993 (aged 24)	17	(United States) San Diego Legion

== Uruguay ==
On 11 January 2018, Meneses named a 26-man squad ahead of Uruguay's 2019 RWC Qualifiers against Canada (doubles up as ARC Round 1) and for the reaming ARC rounds post qualification matches.

^{1} Following the conclusion of the RWC Qualifiers between Canada and Uruguay, Uruguay called up several players to for the remaining games in the ARC.

Head coach: (Argentina) Esteban Meneses

Player	Position	Date of birth (age)	Caps	Club/province
Carlos Arboleya^{1}	Hooker	23 July 1985 (aged 32)	67	(Uruguay) Trébol
Germán Kessler	Hooker	1 July 1994 (aged 23)	31	(Uruguay) Los Cuervos
Carlos Pombo	Hooker	15 May 1990 (aged 27)	3	(Uruguay) Old Boys
Matías Benítez	Prop	16 May 1988 (aged 29)	19	(Uruguay) Champagnat
Juan Echeverría	Prop	9 October 1991 (aged 26)	32	(Uruguay) Old Christians
Felipe Inciarte^{1}	Prop	19 October 1990 (aged 27)	3	(Uruguay) Old Christians
Mario Sagario	Prop	29 June 1986 (aged 31)	66	(Uruguay) Carrasco Polo
Mateo Sanguinetti	Prop	26 July 1992 (aged 25)	43	(Uruguay) Los Cuervos
Diego Ayala^{1}	Lock	27 February 1989 (aged 28)	14	(Uruguay) MVCC
Rodrigo Capó Ortega	Lock	8 December 1980 (aged 37)	39	(France) Castres Olympique
Ignacio Dotti	Lock	18 August 1994 (aged 23)	26	(Uruguay) Los Cuervos
Manuel Leindekar	Lock	23 April 1997 (aged 20)	4	(France) Oyonnax
Diego Magno	Lock	27 April 1989 (aged 28)	76	(Uruguay) MVCC
Juan Manuel Etcheverry^{1}	Flanker		0	(Uruguay) Los Ceibos
Juan Manuel Gaminara (c)	Flanker	1 May 1989 (aged 28)	47	(Uruguay) Old Boys
Rodolfo Garese	Flanker	7 April 1994 (aged 23)	5	(Uruguay) Carrasco Polo
Franco Lamanna	Flanker	5 October 1991 (aged 26)	40	(France) Mazamet
Gonzalo Soto^{1}	Flanker	10 February 1995 (aged 22)	17	(Uruguay) Carrasco Polo
Manuel Diana	Number 8	4 March 1996 (aged 21)	6	(Uruguay) Old Christians
Alejandro Nieto	Number 8	7 January 1988 (aged 30)	55	(Uruguay) Champagnat
Juan Diego Ormaechea^{1}	Number 8	28 January 1989 (aged 28)	20	(Uruguay) Carrasco Polo
Santiago Arata	Scrum-half	2 September 1996 (aged 21)	22	(Uruguay) Old Christians
Agustín Ormaechea	Scrum-half	8 March 1991 (aged 26)	36	(France) Strasbourg
Germán Albanell	Fly-half	6 January 1989 (aged 29)	12	(Uruguay) Old Boys
Felipe Berchesi	Fly-half	12 April 1991 (aged 26)	24	(France) Dax
Manuel Blengio^{1}	Fly-half	28 April 1994 (aged 23)	16	(Uruguay) Old Christians
Andrés de León^{1}	Fly-half	19 July 1992 (aged 25)	0	(Uruguay) Old Christians
Agustín Della Corte^{1}	Centre	11 September 1997 (aged 20)	4	(Uruguay) Trébol
Juan Manuel Cat	Centre	6 September 1996 (aged 21)	13	(Uruguay) Old Boys
Joaquín Prada	Centre	15 July 1991 (aged 26)	36	(Uruguay) Los Cuervos
Andrés Vilaseca	Centre	8 May 1991 (aged 26)	36	(Uruguay) Old Boys
Federico Favaro^{1}	Wing	19 May 1991 (aged 26)	19	(Uruguay) Old Christians
Nicolás Freitas	Wing	3 July 1993 (aged 24)	19	(Uruguay) Carrasco Polo
Tomás Inciarte^{1}	Wing	22 October 1996 (aged 21)	0	(Uruguay) Old Christians
Leandro Leivas^{1}	Wing	6 July 1988 (aged 29)	64	(Uruguay) Old Christians
Rodrigo Silva	Wing	2 November 1992 (aged 25)	42	(Uruguay) Carrasco Polo
Gastón Mieres	Fullback	5 October 1989 (aged 28)	51	(Uruguay) Lobos
