= 2025 Super 12 season =

Brazilian rugby union season

2025 Super 12
- Countries: Brazil
- Date: 10 May - 27 September 2025
- Champions: Jacareí (3rd title)
- Runners-up: Farrapos
- Relegated: Leões de Paraisópolis; Curitiba; Niterói
- Matches played: 52
- Top point scorer: (Brazil) Nicolas Azevedo (125 points)
- Top try scorer: (Brazil) Carlos Torres (10 tries)

The 2025 Super 12 competition was the 61st Brazilian domestic rugby union club competition organized by the Confederação Brasileira de Rugby (CBRu).

== Format ==
The tournament consists of 12 teams. In the first phase, the teams are divided into 3 groups of 4 teams each, playing in a round-robin format, home and away. The top two teams from each group advance to the Final Hexagonal (2nd Phase), which consists of 6 teams in total, playing in a single round-robin format. The top two teams from each group then advance to the final, where they play a single match to decide who is the champion.

In the first phase, the last two teams from each group go to the Relegation Round, where they will play against the best first and second place teams from each of the 3 groups in the Second Division. The 12 teams play in 3 groups of 4 teams, and the two best teams from each group go to the Super 12 the following year. And the two worst teams from each group go to the Second Division the following year.

Regarding the points system, the scoring works as follows:

• 4 points to the winner of the match
• 2 points in case of a draw
• 1 point in case of defeat by a difference of 7 points or less
• 1 point for the team that scores 4 or more tries
• 0 points in case of defeat by more than 7 points.

== Teams ==
2025 Super 12 season (Brazil)
Locations of clubs competing in the 2025 Super 12.

== Table ==
=== Group A ===
Pos	Team	Pld	W	D	L	PF	PA	PD	TF	TA	TB	LB	Pts	Qualification
1	(Rio Grande do Sul) Farrapos	6	6	0	0	302	14	+288	215	10	6	0	30	Qualified for the Hexagonal
2	(Rio Grande do Sul) Charrua	6	3	0	3	95	228	−133	75	155	3	0	15	Qualified for the Hexagonal
3	(Santa Catarina (state)) Joaca	6	2	0	4	101	131	−30	65	105	3	0	11	Qualified for the Relegation Round
4	(Santa Catarina (state)) Desterro	6	1	0	5	73	198	−125	45	130	1	0	5	Qualified for the Relegation Round

Updated to match(es) played on unknown. Source: Brasil Rugby

=== Group B ===
Pos	Team	Pld	W	D	L	PF	PA	PD	TF	TA	TB	LB	Pts	Qualification
1	(São Paulo (state)) São José	6	6	0	0	241	72	+169	165	50	4	0	28	Qualified for the Hexagonal
2	(São Paulo (state)) Pasteur	6	3	0	3	201	120	+81	135	75	5	0	17	Qualified for the Hexagonal
3	(São Paulo (state)) Leões de Paraisópolis	6	2	0	4	105	212	−107	75	150	4	0	12	Qualified for the Relegation Round
4	(Paraná (state)) Curitiba	6	1	0	5	96	239	−143	65	165	3	0	7	Qualified for the Relegation Round

Updated to match(es) played on unknown. Source: Brasil Rugby

=== Group C ===
Pos	Team	Pld	W	D	L	PF	PA	PD	TF	TA	TB	LB	Pts	Qualification
1	(São Paulo (state)) Jacareí	6	5	0	1	243	56	+187	180	40	5	0	25	Qualified for the Hexagonal
2	(São Paulo (state)) Poli	6	5	0	1	188	104	+84	155	70	4	0	24	Qualified for the Hexagonal
3	(São Paulo (state)) SPAC	6	2	0	4	223	157	+66	175	125	3	0	11	Qualified for the Relegation Round
4	(Rio de Janeiro (state)) Niterói	6	0	0	6	50	387	−337	35	310	0	0	0	Qualified for the Relegation Round

Updated to match(es) played on unknown. Source: Brasil Rugby

== Hexagonal ==
The Hexagonal stage consists of six teams from the three groups of the Group Stage. The top two teams advance to the final.

Pos	Team	Pld	W	D	L	PF	PA	PD	TF	TA	TB	LB	Pts	Qualification
1	(São Paulo (state)) Jacareí	5	4	0	1	273	73	+200	195	45	6	0	22	Qualified for the Final
2	(Rio Grande do Sul) Farrapos	5	4	0	1	170	84	+86	130	55	5	0	21	Qualified for the Final
3	(São Paulo (state)) Poli	5	4	0	1	213	111	+102	165	85	4	0	20	
4	(São Paulo (state)) São José	5	2	0	3	115	138	−23	80	105	3	0	11	
5	(São Paulo (state)) Pasteur	5	1	0	4	92	225	−133	75	165	1	0	5	
6	(Rio Grande do Sul) Charrua	5	0	0	5	37	272	−235	25	205	0	0	0	

Updated to match(es) played on unknown. Source: Brasil Rugby

== Final ==
27 September 2025
15:00

Jacareí	11:11 (a.e.t.)	Farrapos
Try: Lyan Aquino 20' c Pen: Nicolas Azevedo 3', 16'	Report	Try: Pardal 68' c Pen: Civardi 24', 31'
	Penalties
Nicolas Azevedo; Brasil; Andrei Santana; Boi	4-3	Jambão; Civardi; Duda; Bindé; Matheus Almeida

Campo do Balneário, Jacareí
Referee: Cauã Ricardo Santos Maria

== Relegation Round ==
The relegation round consisted of 12 teams: 6 coming from the first division (the bottom two from each group) and 6 coming from the second division (the top two from each group).

=== Group A ===
Pos	Team	Pld	W	D	L	PF	PA	PD	TF	TA	TB	LB	Pts	Qualification
1	(Santa Catarina (state)) Joaca	3	3	0	0	75	22	+53	55	15	1	0	13	Remained in Super 12
2	(Santa Catarina (state)) Desterro	3	2	0	1	91	37	+54	75	25	3	0	11	Remained in Super 12
3	(Rio Grande do Sul) Serra Gaúcha	3	1	0	2	89	105	−16	65	65	1	0	5	Remained in Super 12 - Segunda Divisão
4	(Rio Grande do Sul) Colonos	3	0	0	3	31	122	−91	5	95	0	0	0	Remained in Super 12 - Segunda Divisão

Updated to match(es) played on unknown. Source: Brasil Rugby

=== Group B ===
Pos	Team	Pld	W	D	L	PF	PA	PD	TF	TA	TB	LB	Pts	Promotion
1	(São Paulo (state)) Tornados Indaiatuba	3	2	0	1	80	50	+30	60	30	1	0	9	Promoted to Super 12
2	(São Paulo (state)) Leões de Paraisópolis	3	2	0	1	70	46	+24	45	35	1	0	9	Relegated to Super 12 - Segunda Divisão
3	(São Paulo (state)) Rio Branco	3	2	0	1	61	84	−23	40	65	1	0	9	Promoted to Super 12
4	(Paraná (state)) Curitiba	3	0	0	3	49	80	−31	35	50	0	0	0	Relegated to Super 12 - Segunda Divisão

Updated to match(es) played on unknown. Source: Brasil Rugby

=== Group C ===
Pos	Team	Pld	W	D	L	PF	PA	PD	TF	TA	TB	LB	Pts	Qualification
1	(São Paulo (state)) SPAC	3	3	0	0	169	19	+150	135	15	3	0	15	Remained in Super 12
2	(Minas Gerais) Nova Lima	3	2	0	1	77	68	+9	60	55	2	0	10	Promoted to Super 12
3	(Rio de Janeiro (state)) Niterói	3	1	0	2	91	83	+8	85	65	2	0	6	Relegated to Super 12 - Segunda Divisão
4	(Rio de Janeiro (state)) Carioca	3	0	0	3	3	170	−167	0	145	0	0	0	Remained in Super 12 - Segunda Divisão

Updated to match(es) played on unknown. Source: Brasil Rugby

== Leading scorers ==
=== Most points ===
Rank	Player	Club	Points
1	(Brazil) Nicolas Azevedo	(São Paulo (state)) Jacareí	125
2	(Brazil) Facundo Flores	(Rio Grande do Sul) Farrapos	67
3	(Brazil) Gero	(São Paulo (state)) Pasteur	63
4	(Brazil) Laurent Bourda-Couhet	(São Paulo (state)) Poli	60
4	(Brazil) Carlos Henrique da Silva Martins	(São Paulo (state)) São José	60
6	(Brazil) Rafael	(Santa Catarina (state)) Joaca	56
7	(Brazil) Veneza	(São Paulo (state)) SPAC	55
8	(Chile) Carlos Torres Barría	(São Paulo (state)) Poli	50
9	(Brazil) Maiki Gustavo Lemes dos Santos	(São Paulo (state)) Jacareí	45
10	(Brazil) Corvo	(São Paulo (state)) São José Rugby Clube	40
10	(Brazil) Lafa	(Rio Grande do Sul) Farrapos	40

=== Most tries ===
Rank	Player	Club	Tries
1	(Chile) Carlos Torres Barría	(São Paulo (state)) Poli	10
2	(Brazil) Maiki Gustavo Lemes dos Santos	(São Paulo (state)) Jacareí	9
3	(Brazil) Veneza	(São Paulo (state)) SPAC	8
3	(Brazil) Corvo	(São Paulo (state)) São José	8
3	(Brazil) Lafa	(Rio Grande do Sul) Farrapos	8
6	(Brazil) Boi	(São Paulo (state)) Jacareí	7
6	(Brazil) Brayan	(São Paulo (state)) Jacareí	7
8	(Brazil) Lucas Drudi	(São Paulo (state)) Jacareí	6
8	(Brazil) Hanz	(São Paulo (state)) Poli	6
8	(Brazil) Guilherme Fortes Dias	(Rio Grande do Sul) Charrua	6
8	(Brazil) Leonardo de Paula	(Rio Grande do Sul) Farrapos	6
8	(Brazil) Pex	(São Paulo (state)) São José	6
