= Fernando Portugal =

- Born: 4 September 1981 (age 45) São José dos Campos
- Height: 1.84 m (6 ft 0 in)
- Weight: 95 kg (209 lb)

Rugby union career
- Position: Centre
Amateur team(s)
Years	Team	Apps	(Points)
- São José Rugby Clube
International career
Years	Team	Apps	(Points)
- Brazil
National sevens team
Years	Team		Comps
- Brazil

Fernando Henrique Jungers Portugal (born São José dos Campos, 4 July 1981) is a former Brazilian rugby union player and a current coach. He played as a centre.

He first played for São José Rugby Clube, where first appeared in 1996/97, joining the first team in 1999/2000. He developed as a player at São José Rugby, being called for the Brazil for the U-20 category in 1999. He played then for the Rugby World Cup U-20. He won the Brazilian Rugby Championship three times, in 2002, 2003 and 2004. He moved to Segni in Italy, in 2005/06, where he played two years. He was one of the first Brazilian rugby union players to be able to perform in a professional level. He returned to São José Rugby in 2007/08, moving the following season to Bandeirantes Rugby Club, where he played until 2013. He won the Brazilian Rugby Championship in 2009. He returned to São José Rugby for the 2013 season.

He was a regular player for Brazil. He was also the captain of the Sevens national team. Portugal has a degree in P.E.

He was announced as the new head coach of Brazil in November 2019.

Sporting positions
Preceded by (Argentina) Rodolfo Ambrosio	Brazil National Rugby Union Coach; 2019-2023	Succeeded by (Uruguay) Emiliano Caffera
