= Sarrasin =

Sarrasin may refer to:

- Sarrasin, author of the Romance of Le Hem (1278)
- Grégory Sarrasin (born 1979), Swiss sport wrestler
- Maeva Sarrasin (born 1987), Swiss footballer

== See also ==
- Saracen (disambiguation)
- Sarrazin (disambiguation)
