= Pasteur Athletique Club =

(Brazil) Pasteur Athletique Club
- Nickname(s): Pasteur, PAC, Galo (Rooster)
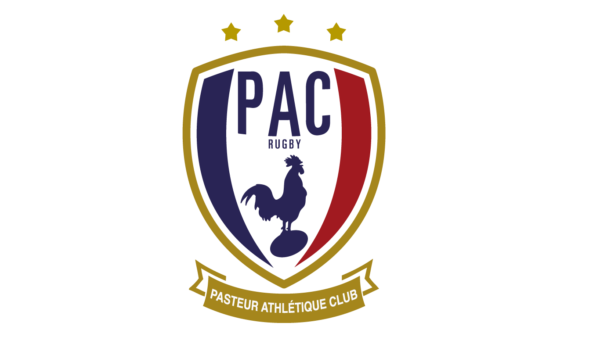
- Emblem
- Founded: 13 October 1981
- Location: São Paulo
- Ground: Liceu Pasteur - Rua Mairinque - Vila Mariana - São Paulo (capacity: 2.000 )
- League(s): Campeonato Brasileiro de Rugby, Campeonato Paulista de Rugby

Official website
- pacrugby.com.br

Pasteur Athletique Club is a sports club based in the city of São Paulo, Brazil. Founded on October 13, 1981, it is one of the leading rugby clubs in Brazil.

== History ==
The club has ties to the Liceu Pasteur school, at the Mairinque unit, where rugby began to be practiced between 1962 and 1964 by students of French origin, who practiced the sport in their country, where it is popular. At that time, a large part of the rugby clubs in São Paulo were formed by foreign communities, such as SPAC (founded by English people), Nippon (founded by Japanese people) and Alphaville (founded by Argentinians).

A youth team was formed, which came to be called "Le Pasteur", and the rooster was chosen as its mascot, something that refers to its origin, since this animal is a traditional French symbol. In the 1980s, rugby teams mostly existed informally, something that had to change if they wanted to develop their practice. Then, on October 13, 1981, the Pasteur Athletique Club was officially founded, independently of the Liceu Pasteur.

At the time, the main leaders were Mr. Taulère, Jean François Teisseire, and Zakarias Nahas, among others. Over the years, many of the players of French origin ended up distancing themselves for various reasons, while Brazilians began to join the team, making it more cosmopolitan. Despite the "opening up," the club is still seen as a link to the French community in Brazil, often being mentioned by French media outlets, even being featured in an article in Le Figaro, one of France's largest newspapers.

The club invests in its youth categories and also participates in inclusive projects focused on rugby. Since its inception, Pasteur has supplied the Brazilian National Rugby Team with players in various categories.

== Honours ==
- Campeonato Brasileiro de Rugby (1987, 1994 and 2023)
- Campeonato Paulista de Rugby (2012, 2015, 2019 and 2023)
