= Bandeirantes Rugby Club =

Bandeirantes Rugby Club or simply Bandeirantes or Band Saracens was a Brazilian rugby club from São Paulo, filiated to the Brazilian Rugby Confederation and the Federação Paulista de Rugby. Founded in March 1983, it was one of the most traditional Brazilian rugby teams, and one of the most successful national champions still in activity. In 2013 Bandeirante made a partnership with the English club Saracens, adopting the name São Paulo Saracens Bandeirantes.

In 2023 the club ceased operations.

== Honours ==
=== Men's Rugby ===
- (Brazil) Campeonato Brasileiro de Rugby (1988, 1995, 2001, 2009)
- (Brazil) Taça Tupi (2017)
- (São Paulo (state)) Campeonato Paulista de Rugby (1990, 1996, 1998, 2000, 2003)
- (Brazil) Campeonato Brasileiro de Rugby Série B (1983, 2017)
- (São Paulo (state)) Campeonato Paulista de Rugby Série B (1984)
- (São Paulo (state)) Torneio Início Paulista (2000, 2004)
- Torneio Mercosul de Rugby (1995)

Women's Rugby

- (Brazil) Super Sevens (2019, 2022)
- (São Paulo (state)) Campeonato Paulista de Rugby Feminino (2011, 2013,2018, 2019, 2021)
