= Guido Volpi =

Argentine rugby union player

- Full name: Guido Volpi
- Born: 22 August 1995 (age 31) Quilmes, Argentina
- Height: 193 cm (6 ft 4 in)
- Weight: 117 kg (18 st 6 lb; 258 lb)
- School: St George's College

Rugby union career
- Position: Lock or Flanker
- Current team: Zebre Parma
Youth career
- St Georges
- –: CUQ
Amateur team(s)
Years	Team	Apps	(Points)
- CUQ
- Old Georgian Club
Senior career
Years	Team	Apps	(Points)
2017−2018	Narbonne		
2018–2021	Ospreys	14	(0)
2020−2021	→Doncaster Knights	13	(10)
2021−2022	Doncaster Knights	17	(15)
2022−2026	Zebre Parma	36	(0)
- Correct as of 2 Jun 2025

Guido Volpi (born 22 August 1995) is an Argentine rugby union player, who plays for Zebre Parma in United Rugby Championship as lock or flanker.

Volpi made his debut for the Ospreys in 2018, having previously played for espoirs team of Narbonne, in 2017−2018 season, and the Ospreys Development team. He made his Pro14 debut on 14 September 2018 against the Munster. He played for Doncaster Knights, on loan from Ospreys two times: from January 2020 to the end of the season 2019−2020 and from December 2020 to the end of 2020−2021 season. In May 2021 he signed a one-year contract with Doncaster Knights.
