= Rugby union in Brazil =

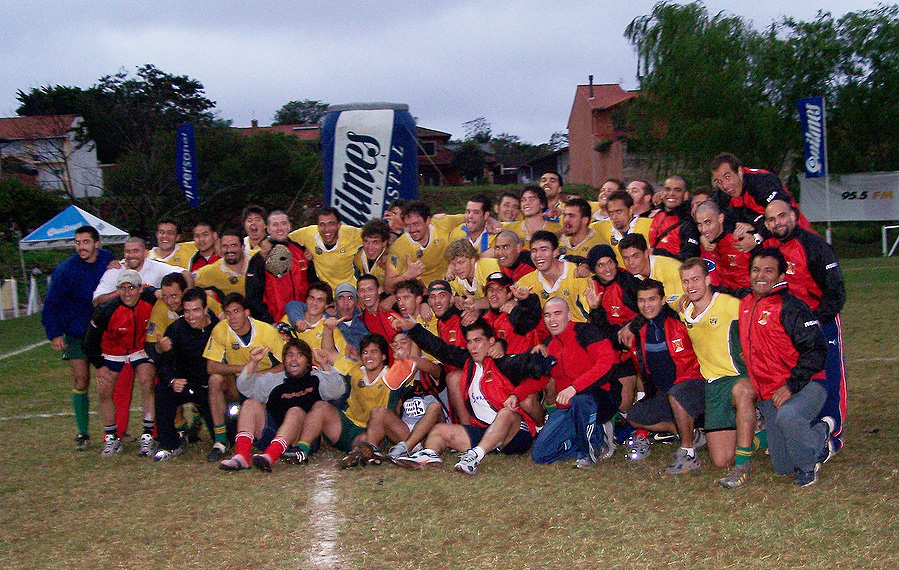
- The Brazilian and Peruvian national teams
- Country: Brazil
- Governing body: Confederação Brasileira de Rugby
- National team: Brazil
- First played: 1891
- Registered players: 60000
- Clubs: 301

National competitions
- Rugby World Cup; Rugby World Cup Sevens; IRB Sevens World Series

Club competitions
- Campeonato Brasileiro de Rugby; Brazil Sevens

Rugby union in Brazil is a rapidly growing sport, with rugby union increasing in popularity at universities across Brazil.

Rugby union is played regularly in all of Brazil's 26 states and in the Federal District. The sport is not widely played in schools, but is common in universities, more specifically the South, South East as well as parts of Amazon and the North East. The South East usually supplies the largest number of players to the national side. As of 2016, rugby is played by about 60,000 Brazilians and has experienced sizeable growth in the country.

Brazil also competes in the South American tournaments sevens. The women's national team is the strongest in South America, and finished in 10th place at the 2009 Rugby Sevens World Cup in Dubai.

In 2020, Brazil started a professional franchise in the new Superliga Americana de Rugby.

== Governing body ==
Rugby union is administered by the Brazilian Rugby Confederation (Confederação Brasileira de Rugby, or CBRu), founded in 2010. It is the successor of the União de Rugby do Brasil (founded in 1963) and the Associação Brasileira de Rugby (founded in 1972). It became a member of the International Rugby Board in 1995. The confederation has six affiliate state federations: Gaúcha (Rio Grande do Sul), Catarinense (Santa Catarina), Paranaense (Paraná), Paulista (São Paulo), Mineira (Minas Gerais), and Fluminense (Rio de Janeiro). Other state federations are unaffiliated with the CBRu.

== History ==
Rugby was brought to Brazil by the British in the late nineteenth century. The first recorded Brazilian club was founded in 1891, in Rio de Janeiro. In 1895 rugby was introduced in São Paulo Athletic Club. The first recorded match took place in 1926 between São Paulo and Santos city representatives and matches between São Paulo and Rio de Janeiro states were played almost every year between the 1926 and 1963.

In 1932 Brazil hosted the Junior Springboks, while in 1936 it was visited by the British and Irish Lions, in their way back from Argentina. It was in 1950 that the Brazilian national team was formed again and it debuted in the South American Rugby Championship in 1951. In 1964, São Paulo hosted for the first time the South American Championship and finished second to Argentina. It would be only in 2018 that such result would be bested. Between the late 1960s and early 1990s, Brazil disputed with Paraguay the 4th place in the South American Championship, always behind Argentina, Uruguay and Chile. Until the 1970s, most players were of British and Argentine origins, but the sport started to have most Brazilian players from the 1970s.

Brazil has also been visited by at least two French tours - that of 1974 and that of 1985.

In 1988, rugby was being played in only three of the Brazilian states. However, some progress had been made - in 1963, it was recorded that 95% of Brazilian players were foreigners, and there were only four clubs; by 1988, 75% of Brazilian rugby players were native born, and there were thirty five clubs. São Paulo concentrated the vast majority of the clubs and it is still the hotbed of the sport in the country, although Southern states (Paraná, Santa Catarina and Rio Grande do Sul) emerged as competitors to São Paulo's hegemony from the 1990s.

In 2004, Brazil won the first South American Women's Sevens Championship and is still the biggest South American champion.

On 9 October 2009, the International Olympic Committee announced that rugby sevens would be part of the 2016 Summer Olympics which will be held in Rio de Janeiro.

== National team ==
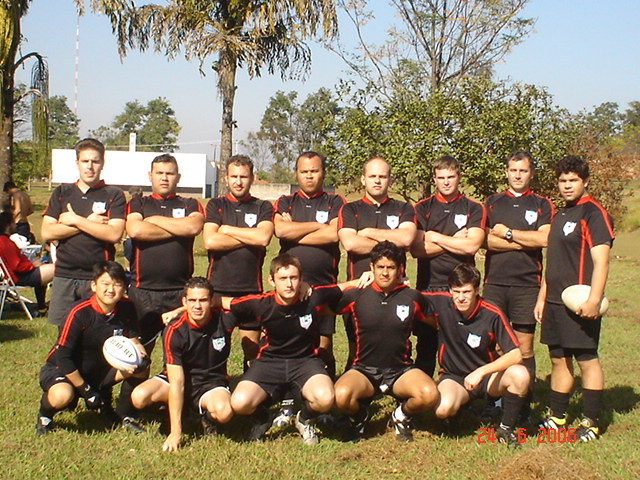
Lobo Bravo Rugby - The Wolves

The national team have been playing international matches since the 1950s but have yet to qualify for the Rugby World Cup.

The Brazil national rugby union team won five South American Championship B and is now playing the South American Championship A. The Brazil national team are generally ranked around 30th in the world, and have been ranked as the 3rd best South American team since they passed Paraguary in the world rankings in 2008.

The women's national rugby sevens team is the best in South America, and has won all the sevens championships ever played, without losing a single match.

== Domestic organisation ==
The domestic club competition is the Campeonato Brasileiro de Rugby, or Super 10, which has been contested annually since 1964.

== In television ==
The only way to watch rugby union in Brazil is through paid subscriptions, but the vast majority of Brazilians don't have paid TV, resulting in the sport being fairly unknown by the majority of the population. The first rugby union matches shown in Brazil was on ESPN during the 1999 Rugby World Cup (only highlights).

The 2003 Rugby World Cup was the first live broadcast in the country by ESPN, thanks to the ABR efforts to make the IRB send the signal freely to the country.

In 2007 Rugby World Cup ESPN got the 2nd place in audience with the paid channels, having a great coverage of the event sending reporters to France.

In 2011 Pan American Games Rede Record (open air TV) broadcast some Brazilian matches of rugby sevens.

In 2016, RedeTV! made the first rugby union live broadcast on Brazilian open air TV, showing Brazil's matches at South American Rugby Championship.

Nowadays the Rugby World Cup, Six Nations Championship, Rugby Champions Cup and The Rugby Championship are the main events broadcast by ESPN Brasil.

== See also ==
- Sport in Brazil
- Brazil national rugby union team
- Brazil national rugby sevens team
- Campeonato Brasileiro de Rugby
- Rugby union in Portugal and Rugby union in Macau

== Bibliography ==
- The Whitbread Rugby World '89, by Nigel Starmer-Smith - Published by Macdonald & Co (1988) - ISBN 978-1852910389
