= Charrua Rugby Clube =

Brazilian rugby union club

(Brazil) Charrua
- Full name: Charrua Rugby Clube
- Union: Brazilian Rugby Confederation; Gaúcho Rugby Federation
- Founded: June 2, 2001
- Region: Porto Alegre, RS, Brazil
- Ground: ESEF/UFRGS
- President: (Brazil) Uary Gondim
- Coach: (Argentina) Diego Martin
- Captain: (Brazil) Diego Pietrobon
- 2011: 4th place of Liga Sul (Rio Grande do Sul) 3rd of Gaúcho
1st kit	2nd kit

Official website
- charruarugby.com

Charrua Rugby Clube is a Brazilian rugby union club from the city of Porto Alegre, Rio Grande do Sul. Charrua was founded on June 1, 2001, and they are the first rugby club in the state of Rio Grande do Sul.

== History ==
At the year of 2000, a group of friends, led by Nilson Taminato (former player of Rio Branco Rugby Clube) and Mauro Croitor, gathered to start practicing rugby, and on June 2, 2001, they officially founded the Charrua Rugby Clube. They first match was against Desterro and the first Charrua try was scored by Edson Taminato (Nilson's brother). The club is affiliated to the Brazilian Rugby Confederation.

The club's slogan, which uses local and informal terms, is "Não 'tá morto quem peleia!" ("Not dead, he who fights") and is shouted at the end of each practice, and the beginning and ending of their games. Their colors are a tribute to the city derby Grenal.

Concerned about their social responsibilities to Charrua since its foundation, the club engages in actions such as the Campaign for Food and Sweaters.

== Presidential management ==
- Nilson Taminato (2001–2005)
- Álvaro Montandón (2005–2007)
- Rodrigo dos Reis (2007–2009)
- Álvaro Montandón (2009–2011)
- Uary Gondim (2011-current)

== Main Titles ==
Males:

- Championship in southern Brazil (Liga Sul): 1 time (2007)
- Championship of the state of Rio Grande do Sul (Campeonato Gaúcho): 2 times (2006, 2007)

Females:

- Championship in southern Brazil (Liga Sul): 3 times (2007, 2008, 2009)

== See also ==
- Charrúa people
