= Saracen (disambiguation) =

Saracen is a European medieval term for Muslims, adopted from Latin.

Saracen or Saracens may also refer to:

== Art, entertainment, and media ==
=== Fictional characters ===
- Saracen (comics), a Marvel Comics character
- Lorraine Saracen, a character from the American television series Friday Night Lights
- Matt Saracen, a character from the American television series Friday Night Lights

=== Works of fiction ===
- The Saracen, a two-part novel by Robert Shea
- The Saracen (opera), an 1899 opera by César Cui
- Saracen (TV series), a 1989 ITV action drama about a private security firm of that name

== Enterprises ==
- Saracen Cycles, formerly an independent British bicycle manufacturer, now a sub brand of Madison
- Saracen Foundry, Glasgow, Scotland, established in 1850

== Military ==
- Alvis Saracen, a six-wheeled armoured personnel carrier built by Alvis
- HMS Saracen, six ships of the Royal Navy
- Saracen, Sam Houston's horse during Battle of San Jacinto

== People ==
- Saracen (Quapaw chief), chief of the Quapaw people

== Sports ==
- Cardiff Saracens RFC, a Welsh rugby union club based in Cardiff
- Cheltenham Saracens F.C., a football club based in Cheltenham, England
- Newport Saracens RFC, a Welsh rugby union club based in Newport
- Saracens F.C., a professional rugby union team based in London, England
  - Saracens Global Network, a group of rugby union clubs affiliated with Saracens F.C., including:
    - Impala Saracens, based in Nairobi, Kenya
    - Lelo Saracens, based in Tbilisi, Georgia
    - São Paulo Saracens Bandeirantes, based in the Brazilian city; see 2017 Americas Rugby Championship squads
    - Seattle Saracens, based in the American city
    - Timișoara Saracens, based in the Romanian city
    - VVA Saracens, based in Monino, near Moscow, Russia
- Saracens Women, a rugby union club based in London
- Saracens Sports Club, a Sri Lankan cricket team
- Saracens Mavericks, a netball team based in Hertfordshire, England, part owned by Saracens F.C.

== Other uses ==
- Sunbeam Saracen, an early aero engine, of which only prototypes were built

== See also ==
- Saracinesco, a commune in the Province of Rome, Italy
- Sarsen, a sandstone block
- Sarrazin (disambiguation)
