= Brazilian Rugby Union Championship =

Campeonato Brasileiro Masculino de Rugby XV
- Sport: Rugby union
- First season: 1964
- No. of teams: 12 (2026)
- Country: Brazil
- Most recent champion: Farrapos (2026)
- Most titles: SPAC (13 titles)

The Brazilian Rugby Union Championship (in Portuguese: Campeonato Brasileiro Masculino de Rugby XV), or Super 12, is the main tournament for rugby union clubs in Brazil since 1964. The tournament is organized by the Brazilian Rugby Confederation (CBRu).

== Competition format ==
In the 2006, the competition consisted of eight clubs, in two groups of four teams. The clubs from one group played once against the four clubs in the other group, with the two best placed teams in each group qualifying for the semi-finals. The semi-finals and the final were one-legged matches. Since 2009, the competition consisted of one division with each team playing the others once.

== List of champions ==
| Season | Champions | Runners-up |
|---|---|---|
| 1964 | SPAC (1) | |
| 1965 | SPAC (2) | |
| 1966 | SPAC (3) | |
| 1967 | SPAC (4) | |
| 1968 | SPAC (5) | |
| 1969 | SPAC (6) | |
| 1970 | São Paulo Barbarians (1) | SPAC |
| 1971 | São Paulo Barbarians (2) | |
| 1972 | FUPE (1) | Rio Cricket |
| 1973 | Medicina (1) | |
| 1974 | SPAC (7) | Pasteur |
| 1975 | SPAC (8) | |
| 1976 | SPAC (9); Niterói (1) | |
| 1977 | SPAC (10) | Niterói |
| 1978 | SPAC (11) | Niterói |
| 1979 | Niterói (2) | Guanabara |
| 1980 | Alphaville (1) | Niterói |
| 1981 | Medicina (2) | Niterói |
| 1982 | Alphaville (2) | Niterói |
| 1983 | Niterói (3); Alphaville (3) | |
| 1984 | Niterói (4) | Alphaville |
| 1985 | Alphaville (4) | Niterói |
| 1986 | Niterói (5) | FEI Rugby |
| 1987 | Pasteur (1) | Niterói |
| 1988 | Bandeirantes (1) | Niterói |
| 1989 | Alphaville (5) | Niterói |
| 1990 | Niterói (6) | |
| 1991 | Alphaville (6) | Niterói |
| 1992 | Alphaville (7) | |
| 1993 | Rio Branco (1) | |
| 1994 | Pasteur (2) | |
| 1995 | Bandeirantes (2) | |
| 1996 | Desterro (1) | Bandeirantes |
| 1997 | Rio Branco (1) | Niterói |
| 1998 | Rio Branco (2) | SPAC |
| 1999 | SPAC (12) | São José |
| 2000 | Desterro (2) | São José |
| 2001 | Bandeirantes (3) | Pasteur |
| 2002 | São José (1) | Bandeirantes |
| 2003 | São José (2) | Bandeirantes |
| 2004 | São José (3) | SPAC |
| 2005 | Desterro (3) | São José |
| 2006 | Rio Branco (4) | SPAC |
| 2007 | São José (4) | Rio Branco |
| 2008 | São José (5) | Niterói |
| 2009 | Bandeirantes (4) | São José |
| 2010 | São José (6) | Desterro |
| 2011 | São José (7) | Bandeirantes |
| 2012 | São José (8) | SPAC |
| 2013 | SPAC (13) | Pasteur |
| 2014 | Curitiba (1) | São José |
| 2015 | São José (9) | Curitiba |
| 2016 | Curitiba (2) | Desterro |
| 2017 | Jacareí (1) | Farrapos |
| 2018 | Poli (1) | Farrapos |
| 2019 | São José (10) | Poli |
| 2020-2021 | Not held | |
| 2022 | Poli (2) | Jacareí |
| 2023 | Pasteur (3) | Poli |
| 2024 | Jacareí (2) | Farrapos |
| 2025 | Jacareí (3) | Farrapos |
| 2026 | Farrapos (1) | São José |

=== Titles by team ===
| Rank | Club | Winners | Winning years |
|---|---|---|---|
| 1 | SPAC | 13 | 1964, 1965, 1966, 1967, 1968, 1969, 1974, 1975, 1976*, 1977, 1978, 1999, 2013 |
| 2 | São José | 10 | 2002, 2003, 2004, 2007, 2008, 2010, 2011, 2012, 2015, 2019 |
| 3 | Alphaville | 7 | 1980, 1982, 1983**, 1985, 1989, 1991, 1992 |
| 4 | Niterói | 6 | 1976*, 1979, 1983**, 1984, 1986, 1990 |
| 5 | Bandeirantes | 4 | 1988, 1995, 2001, 2009 |
| 5 | Rio Branco | 4 | 1993, 1997, 1998, 2006 |
| 7 | Jacareí | 3 | 2017, 2024, 2025 |
| 7 | Pasteur | 3 | 1987, 1994, 2023 |
| 7 | Desterro | 3 | 1996, 2000, 2005 |
| 10 | Curitiba | 2 | 2014, 2016 |
| 10 | Poli | 2 | 2018, 2022 |
| 10 | Medicina | 2 | 1973, 1981 |
| 10 | São Paulo Barbarians | 2 | 1970, 1971 |
| 14 | FUPE | 1 | 1972 |
| 14 | Farrapos | 1 | 2026 |

* In 1976 the title was shared between SPAC and Niterói ** In 1983 the title was shared between by Alphaville and Niterói

== Former teams ==
Listed alphabetically

- Alphaville Tênis Clube - SP - Barueri
- Araucária Clube de Rugby - PR - Curitiba (extinct)
- Armstrong Dragons - Potiguar Rugby Club - RN - Natal
- Bandeirantes Rugby Club - SP - São Paulo
- Belo Horizonte Rugby - MG - Belo Horizonte
- Curitiba Rugby Clube - PR - Curitiba
- Desterro Rugby Clube - SC - Florianópolis
- Farrapos Rugby Clube - RS - Bento Gonçalves
- FEI Rugby (FEI) - SP - São Bernardo do Campo
- FUPE (Paulista Federation of University Sports) - SP
- Guanabara Rugby Football Clube - RJ - Rio de Janeiro
- Niterói Rugby Football Clube - RJ - Niterói
- Medicina Rugby (FMUSP) - SP - São Paulo
- O'malley's Rugby Football Club - SP - São Paulo
- Orixás - BA (bahiana selection of rugby)
- Pasteur Athletique Club - SP - São Paulo (former team of the College Liceu Pasteur)
- Rio Branco Rugby Clube - SP - São Paulo
- Rio de Janeiro Rugby Football Clube - RJ - Rio de Janeiro
- RJ Union - RJ (extinct)
- São José Rugby Clube - SP - São José dos Campos
- São Paulo Athletic Club - SP - São Paulo
- São Paulo Barbarians R.F.C. - SP - São Paulo (extinct)
- Varginha Rugby - MG - Varginha

== Broadcasting ==
Since 2011, the semi-final and final has been broadcast by SporTV, the most watched sports channel in Brazil.

== See also ==
- Rugby union in Brazil
