= Sarrazin =

Sarrazin or Sarazin may refer to:

== People ==
- Albertine Sarrazin, French author
- Cyprien Sarrazin, French alpine skier
- Dick Sarrazin, ice hockey player
- Jacques Sarazin or Sarrazin (1588/90–1660), French sculptor
- Jean Sarrazin (1770–1819), French general who abandoned Napoleon in 1810
- Jean François Sarrazin, French author
- Kim Sarrazin, Canadian softball player
- Manuel Sarrazin (born 1982), German politician
- Marie-Claude Sarrazin, Quebec politician
- Michael Sarrazin, Canadian actor
- Michel Sarrazin, Canadian scientist and naturalist
- Stéphane Sarrazin, French racing driver
- Thilo Sarrazin, German politician

== Other ==
- Sarrazin Couture Entertainment, a motion picture and television production company
- Castel-Sarrazin

== See also ==
- Saracen (disambiguation)
- Sarrasin
