= Società Italiana di Tiro a Segno =

Argentine sports club

Sociedad Italiana (SITAS)
- Full name: Sociedad Italiana de Tiro al Segno
- Location: El Palomar, Buenos Aires, Argentina
- Founded: 14 May 1895; 130 years ago
- Club colors
- Activities: List: Artistic gymnastics; Athletics; Basque pelota; Basketball; Bowls; Bowling; Cestoball; Field hockey; Football; Judo; Paddle tennis; Roller skating; Rugby union; Target shooting; Show jumping; Swimming; Taekwondo
- Chairman: Juan José Follati
- Website: infositas.com.ar

Società Italiana di Tiro a Segno or Sociedad Italiana de Tiro al Blanco (in English: Italian Target Shooting Society), mostly known for its acronym SITAS, is an Argentine sports club located in El Palomar, Buenos Aires. A wide range of sports are practised at the club, such as artistic gymnastics, athletics, basque pelota, basketball, bowls, bowling, cestoball, field hockey, football, judo, paddle tennis, roller skating, rugby union target shooting, show jumping, swimming and taekwondo.

The senior rugby union team currently plays in Primera A, the second division of the URBA league system. The club has also a women's rugby team competing in "Torneo Femenino", organised by the same body.

Apart from sports, SITAS also hosts other activities such as the teaching of English, French, Choir and Yoga. The club also has a library and a gym.

== History ==
The club was founded by a group of Italian immigrants who were enthusiasts about target shooting. On September 20, 1895, the institution opened its first shooting range in Villa Devoto with the celebration of a shooting contest. Then-President of Argentina Marcelo T. De Alvear and some of his ministers attended to the act.

After the closure of the range in 1926, SITAS acquired a land to Ramos Mejía family, where on December 4, 1938, the club opened its sports facilities. Since then, SITAS has added many activities becoming a multi-sports club.
