= Cestoball =

Team sport

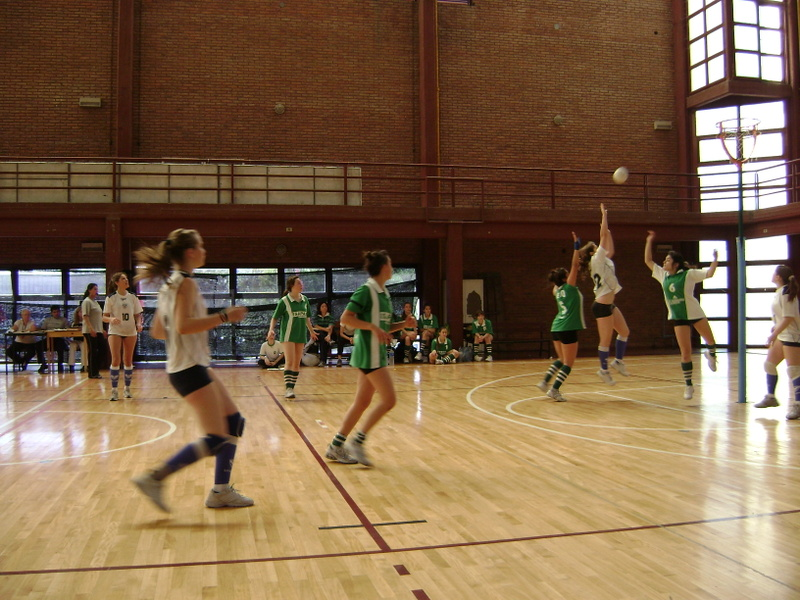
A game of cestoball.

Cestoball is a dynamic team sport that originated in Argentina in 1897, developed by Professor Enrique Romero Brest, a pioneer in Argentine physical education. Initially called pelota al cesto (ball to basket), it was officially incorporated into the national physical education curriculum in 1903. The sport underwent modernization in 1986, evolving to include faster gameplay and higher engagement, leading to its rebranding as Cestoball.

In recent years, Cestoball has gained traction internationally, particularly in regions such as Asia and Africa. In India, the sport is being promoted by enthusiasts like Mohamed Aquib from Bangalore, who helped establish the Cestoball Federation of India and the Asian Cestoball Federation. These organizations aim to secure recognition from national sports authorities and the Indian Olympic Association, with efforts to integrate the sport into school and university programs.

== History ==
In 1897, Enrique Romero Brest, the father of Physical Education in Corrientes, Argentina, began to establish the first rules of Pelota al Cesto, the original name of cestoball. On March 9, 1903, Romero Brest presented a Physical Education program for secondary school students to the then Minister of Education and Public Health, in which Cesto appeared formally for the first time. This program was approved on March 17, 1903.

== Rules ==
A cestoball game is played by two teams of six players each, on a court measuring 28 meters long by 16 meters wide (with maximum and minimum dimensions specified in the rules), divided by a center line.

In each half of the court, there is a basket located within the playing area, 5 meters from the end line. This allows goals to be scored from any point around the basket. The baskets are 3.3 meters high and 50 centimeters in diameter.

The game is divided into two 20-minute halves, with a 5-minute halftime break.
