= Niterói Rugby Football Clube =

- Sport: Rugby union, handball
- Founded: 10 December 1973
- Based in: Niterói, Rio de Janeiro (state), Brazil
- Home ground: Campus UFF Gragoatá (capacity 2000)
- Colours: Red and black

Niterói Rugby Football Club is a multisport club based in Niterói, in the state of Rio de Janeiro, Brazil, focused on rugby and handball. Founded on December 10, 1973, by dissident players from Rio Cricket and students from local schools, such as the Centro Educacional de Niterói and the Liceu Nilo Peçanha, it is the city's main sports association and the most successful rugby team in the state of Rio de Janeiro, being the only club in the state to have been Brazilian champion and currently competing in the elite of national rugby. It is the second-oldest rugby club in the country.

== Honours ==
=== Men's Rugby ===
Adult team
Competition	Ttles	Seasons
Campeonato Brasileiro de Rugby	6	1976, 1979, 1983, 1984, 1986 e 1990
Campeonato Brasileiro de Rugby da Série B	2	1974 e 2015
Copa do Brasil de Rugby	1	2004
Campeonato Fluminense de Rugby XV	25	1978, 1979, 1981, 1982, 1983, 1984, 1985, 1986, 1987, 1988, 1989, 2005, 2006, 2007, 2008, 2009, 2010, 2012, 2013, 2015, 2018, 2019, 2022, 2023 e 2024
Campeonato Fluminense de Rugby Sevens	6	2010, 2014, 2017, 2019, 2021 e 2022
Taça Irmãos Turnbull	1	2016
Circuito de Ten-a-Side Fluminense	1	2006
Torneio Niterói de Rugby de Praia	4	2003, 2004, 2005 e 2006
Torneio Internacional "SEVENS IN THE SAND" Taça Cidade de Niterói	5	1984, 1986, 1987, 1988 e 1989
São Paulo Lions Sevens Rugby Cup	1	2006
Seven de Inverno de Atibaia	1	2004
Tatuí Rugby Sevens	1	2002
Torneio Rugby Cantão/Maldita	1	1986
Youth team
Competition	Titles	Seasons
Campeonato Fluminense de Rugby	6	2004, 2006, 2007, 2012, 2013 e 2014
Torneio Niterói de Rugby de Praia	2	2004 e 2005
Seven Juvenil do Vila Real	2	2006 e 2007
Nikity Rugby Seven-a-Side	1	2008
Campeonato Brasileiro Juvenil Etapa Niteroiense	1	2005
São Paulo Lions Sevens Rugby Cup	2	2006 e 2013
Torneio Cidade de São Paulo de Rugby Seven-a-Side	1	2000

=== Women's rugby ===
Adult team
Competition	Titles	Seasons
Circuito Brasileiro de Rugby Sevens	4	2008/09, 2017, 2018 e 2023
Circuito Brasileiro de Ten-a-Side	1	2004
Torneio Niterói de Rugby de Praia	2	2005 e 2006
Torneio Ten-a-Side de Niterói	1	2004
Nikity Rugby Seven-a-Side	1	2008
Torneio Floripa Rugby Sevens	1	2010
Triangular Amistoso	1	2001
São Paulo Lions Sevens Rugby Cup	1	2005
Torneio Donovan & Macintyre Ten-a-Side	1	2004
Seven de São José dos Campos	1	2008
Seven de São Roque	1	2004
Seven de Inverno de Atibaia	1	2003
