= João Luiz da Ros =

Brazil international rugby union player

- Born: October 7, 1982 (age 44) Florianópolis

Rugby union career
- Position(s): Wing, No. 8
Amateur team(s)
Years	Team	Apps	(Points)
- Desterro R.C
–	Stade Dijonnais		
International career
Years	Team	Apps	(Points)
- Brazil

João Luiz Da Ros (born Florianópolis, 7 October 1982), known as Ige, is a Brazilian rugby union player. He plays as a wing and as a number eight.

Ige played for Desterro Rugby Clube, before moving to France, where he played for the team of the École d`Agronomie de Dijon. He was universitarian champion, in 2007, scoring 12 tries in 7 games. He also attracted the interest of Stade Dijonnais, where he also played. He later returned to Desterro.

He's also a leading name for Brazil national rugby union team and the current captain. He played in the 2007 Rugby World Cup qualifyings, were Brazil was eliminated by Chile national rugby union team. He won also twice the South American B Championship in 2006 and 2007. He participated in the 2011 Rugby World Cup qualification, were the "Vitória Régia" won Paraguay, ascending to the South American A Championship, and Caribbean Champions Trinidad and Tobago, though qualifying for the final round, where they were eliminated. He also played in the 2015 Rugby World Cup qualifyings.
