= Círculo Universitario de Quilmes =

(Argentina) CUQ
- Full name: Círculo Universitario de Quilmes
- Union: Argentine Rugby Union
- Founded: 3 September 1938; 87 years ago
- Ground(s): Quilmes, Buenos Aires
- President: Nicolas Chover
- League: Primera B
- 2015: 6th of Zona Reubicación
Team kit

Círculo Universitario de Quilmes, commonly short named as CUQ, is an Argentine rugby union club sited in Quilmes, Buenos Aires.

The rugby union team currently plays in Primera División B, the second division of the URBA league system.

== Titles ==
=== Men's field hockey ===
Primera División (1):

1992
