= Stefano Giantorno =

Brazilian rugby player (born 1991)

- Born: September 27, 1991 (age 35)
- Height: 1.70 m (5 ft 7 in)
- Weight: 73 kg (161 lb)

Rugby union career
- Position: Scrum-half
Senior career
Years	Team	Apps	(Points)
2013−2015	San Luis	13	(10)
–	São José Rugby Clube		
International career
Years	Team	Apps	(Points)
2015-	Brazil	22	(10)
National sevens team
Years	Team		Comps
- Brazil 7s

Stefano Giantorno (born September 27, 1991) is a Brazilian rugby sevens player. He competed at the 2016 Summer Olympics for Brazil 7s. He plays for the Argentine club San Luis in the Torneo de la URBA.
