= Arthur Bergo =

- Full name: Arthur Bomfim Bergo
- Born: March 7, 1994 (age 32) São Paulo, Brazil
- Height: 1.83 m (6 ft 0 in)
- Weight: 83 kg (183 lb)

Rugby union career
- Position: Flanker
Senior career
Years	Team	Apps	(Points)
2019	Utah Warriors	10	(5)
2020−	Corinthians Rugby		
International career
Years	Team	Apps	(Points)
2015-	Brazil	27	(5)
National sevens team
Years	Team		Comps
2016	Brazil 7s		3

Arthur Bomfim Bergo (born March 7, 1994) is a Brazilian rugby union and rugby sevens player. He plays as flanker. Bergo was selected for Brazil 7s's sevens squad for the 2016 Summer Olympics.
