= Franco Brarda =

Argentine rugby union player

- Born: 23 August 1993 (age 33) Argentina
- Height: 6 ft 0 in (1.83 m)
- Weight: 243 lb (110 kg; 17 st 5 lb)

Rugby union career
- Position: Prop
Senior career
Years	Team	Apps	(Points)
2015–2019	Tala	19	(20)
2019	Calvisano	11	(10)
2020−	Tala		
- Correct as of 3 January 2018
Super Rugby
Years	Team	Apps	(Points)
2018	Jaguares	0	(0)
- Correct as of 3 January 2018
International career
Years	Team	Apps	(Points)
2016–	Argentina XV	21	(16)
- Correct as of 3 January 2018

Franco Brarda (born 23 August 1993) is an Argentine rugby union player who plays for the national Argentina team The Pumas.
