= Curitiba Rugby Clube =

(Brazil) Curitiba
- Full name: Curitiba Rugby Clube
- Union: Brazilian Rugby Association
- Nickname(s): Curitiba, CRC, The Bulls
- Founded: 1981
- Location: Curitiba, Paraná, Brazil
- Chairman: (Brazil) Mauro Callegari
- Coach: (Brazil) Armando H. Gauna
1st kit	2nd kit

Official website
- www.curitibarugby.com

Curitiba Rugby Clube is a Rugby Union team in the city of Curitiba, Paraná, Brazil. It is currently the biggest club in the state, with junior category, children, youth, men and women.

== History ==
Mauro Callegary and Eduardo Laguarrigue created in December 1981, the Curitiba Rugby Club, but only the first practice took place in 1983 in Barigüi Park, after a major release with billboards around the city and schools. In the same year, the club is affiliated to the Brazilian Rugby Association.

== Main Titles ==
Men's:

- Brazilian Rugby Championship 2 titles (2014, 2016)
- Brazilian Championships - B series 2 titles (1989, 2005)
- Brazil Southern League 2 titles (2005, 2006)
- Paraná state Championships 7 titles (2006, 2007, 2008, 2009, 2011, 2012, 2013)

U-21:

- Brazilian Sevens Series 2 titles (2008/09 and 2010/11))
- Brazil Southern League 2 titles (2007, 2010)

== Current squad ==
Country / Name		Position
(Brazil)	Anderson Brandão	Prop
(Brazil)	André L. Amaral - DEZÃO	Prop
(Brazil)	Leonardo B.F Sarro - LÉO	Prop
(Brazil)	Diogo Strapasson	Prop
(Brazil)	Marcelo Ribeiro - URSO	Prop/Centre
(Brazil)	Philipe Domingues	Hooker
(Brazil)	Aristides S. Nazário Jr. - ARI	Hooker
(Brazil)	Leandro G.C Gouvea - RASTA	Lock
(Brazil)	Gabriel C. da Silva - PATETA	lock
(Brazil)	Miguel A. Magalhães	Lock
(Brazil)	Nelton dos Anjos Jr.	Flanker
(Brazil)	Bruno Raposo	Flanker
(Argentina)	Lionel Baudo - LOLI	Flanker
(Brazil)	Márcio C. Lenger	Flanker/Centre
(Argentina)	Augustín G. Losada - TATI	N8
(Brazil)	Plínio Tamaoki Jr.	Scrum Half
(Brazil)	Matheus Sampaio	Fly-half/Centre/Wing
(Brazil)	Alexandre M.M. Jorge - PARDAL	Fly-half/Centre/Fullback
(Argentina)	Augustín M. Eusebio - VITA	Fly-half/Fullback
(France)	Pierre Gouin	Centre
(Brazil)	Carlos A. Andrade - BETINHO	Centre
(Brazil)	Eduardo Bunick Jr. - JUNINHO	Centre/Fly-half
(Brazil)	Max J. Lourenço	Centre/Wing
(Brazil)	Pedro A. Lande	Centre/Wing
(Brazil)	Juarez Villela F. - JOTA	Centre/Fullback
(France)	Thoma Rerat	Centre/Fullback
(Brazil)	Júlio A. dos Reis	Wing
(Brazil)	Alexandre C. Vianna	Wing
(Brazil)	Raphael Domingues	Wing
(Brazil)	Estevam V. Aguirre - CIRILO	Wing
(Brazil)	Breno M. de Campos	Fullback/Wing
Coach
(Brazil)	Armando H. Gauna	Head coach
