= São José Rugby Clube =

(Brazil) São José Rugby
- Full name: São José Rugby Clube
- Union: Associação Brasileira de Rugby
- Nickname: São José
- Founded: 1987; 39 years ago
- Region: São José dos Campos, SP, Brazil
- Ground: Teatrão
- President: Ange Guimera
- Coach: Maurício Coelho
- Captain: Christiano Fonseca
- League: Brasileiro
- 2025: 4th Place (Final Hexagonal)
Team kit

Official website
- www.saojoserugby.com.br

São José Rugby Clube Portuguese pronunciation: [ˈsɐ̃w ʒuˈsɛ ˈʁɐɡbi ˈklubi], founded in 1987, is one of the most important rugby (union) teams in Brazil, holding several titles. It is based in São José dos Campos.

== Rugby union titles ==
The club won the Campeonato Brasileiro de Rugby (Brazilian National Championship) 10 times (2002, 2003, 2004, 2007, 2008, 2010, 2011, 2012, 2015 and 2019) and finished as runners-up in 1999, 2000, 2005, and 2009.

The club also won the Campeonato Paulista (São Paulo State Championship) of 2004, 2005, 2006, 2007, 2008, 2009, 2010, 2011, 2013 and 2014.

== See also ==
- Campeonato Brasileiro de Rugby - The rugby competition that São José competes in.
