= Desterro Rugby Clube =

Brazilian rugby union team

Desterro
- Full name: Desterro Rugby Clube
- Union: Brazilian Rugby Association
- Nickname(s): Desterro
- Founded: 1995; 30 years ago
- Region: Florianópolis, Santa Catarina, Brazil
- President: (Brazil) Maria Mikaella Oliveira
- Coach(es): (Argentina) Sergio Jimenez
- Captain(s): (Brazil) João Luiz da Ros
- League(s): (Brazil) Brazilian Championship Liga Sul de Rugby (Santa Catarina (state)) Catarinense Championship
Team kit

Official website
- www.desterrorugby.com.br

The Desterro Rugby Clube is a Brazilian rugby union (union) team from the city of Florianópolis, capital of the southern State of Santa Catarina. It has won the Brazilian Rugby Championship in three occasions: 1996, 2000 and 2005.

== History ==
Desterro's history began in 1994, when a group of young men got together with the Portuguese Miguel Caçote, who had many years of experience in rugby. The first practices took place at “Joaquina” Beach, as the group didn't have a place to practice, and this beach was the only one in the island at the time with illumination. Desterro's first game was played in Curitiba, and the local team won. Still in 1994, the first rugby game ever was played in Santa Catarina State, and it was also Desterro's first victory, by 32 x 29.

In 1995 Desterro was founded as a Rugby Club in legal terms, and had its first contacts with Brazilian Rugby Association. In the year of 1996, the First Floripa Beach Rugby Sevens took place in “Jurerê Internacional” Beach, played by most of the mayor Brazilian Clubs. In the next year, some clubs from Argentina and Uruguay also took part in the tournament, and Desterro was the champion. In July 1996 Desterro had its first International Tour, staying for ten days in the Argentine towns of Buenos Aires and La Plata, playing against traditional Clubs as SIC (San Isidro Club – Buenos Aires), Universitario, Los Tilos and San Luís (La Plata).

In the second semester Desterro played for the first time the Brazilian Rugby Championship and became for the first time the Brazilian Rugby Champion, beating the strong Bandeirantes side by 24 x21 in São Paulo. In the year 2000 Desterro was once again Brazilian Champion, this time beating the favorites São José in São José dos Campos, by 21 x 20. Desterro's third Brazilian Championship came in 2005, with another victory over São José (16x10), this time in São Paulo.

In 1998, Desterro's Junior side became Brazilian Rugby Junior's Champion and the women's side played for the first time a tournament at national level. It was in Campos do Jordão, and Desterro was the champion. Desterro is the organizer of the annual "Floripa Rugby Sevens", played in February, with teams from Brazil, Argentina, Paraguay and Uruguay.

== Main titles ==
Adult Male:

- Brazilian Rugby Championship 3 times (1996, 2000, 2005)
- Championship in southern Brazil (Liga Sul de Rugby) 3 times (2003. 2004, 2008)
- Championnat Regional Championship of the state Santa Catarina 1 time (2006)

Adult Female:

- Championship in southern Brazil (Liga Sul de Rugby) 2 times (2005, 2006)
- Championnat Regional Championship of the state Santa Catarina 1 time (2006)

Juvenile Male:

- Brazilian Rugby Championship 1 time (1998)
