= São Paulo Athletic Club =

São Paulo (SPAC)
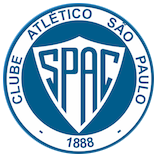
- Full name: São Paulo Athletic Club
- Union: Brazilian Rugby Confederation
- Founded: 13 May 1888; 138 years ago
- Location: São Paulo
- Region: São Paulo (state)
- President: John McDonnel
- League: Campeonato Brasileiro
Team kit

Official website
- spac.org.br

São Paulo Athletic Club - officially nowadays Clube Atlético São Paulo, but generally referred to as SPAC, is a Brazilian sports club founded on 13 May 1888 by Charles William Miller and several English immigrants, being one of the first association football clubs in the country. Although football is not practised anymore, SPAC currently hosts the practice of futsal, rugby union, squash, swimming, tennis and volleyball.

== History ==
São Paulo Athletic Clube was established by the British community living in São Paulo, in 1888. Those British residents used to play cricket at the Pirituba field, property of British company São Paulo Railway Co.

One of the most notable members and sportsmen in the club’s history was Charles Miller, who after returning to his native country from England (where he had studied) began to actively participate in the development of the club. Miller (who was 19 and is considered the "father" of Paulista football) introduced football and rugby to the club in 1895, even bringing some footballs and a rules book to teach the basis of the sport there. SPAC and Miller were founding members of the Campeonato Paulista, the first football tournament not only of São Paulo but Brazil, whose first edition was in 1902. SPAC won the championship, with Miller also being the top scorer of the tournament with 10 goals. SPAC would win 3 further titles (in 1903, 1904 and 1911), totalling four football championships in all.

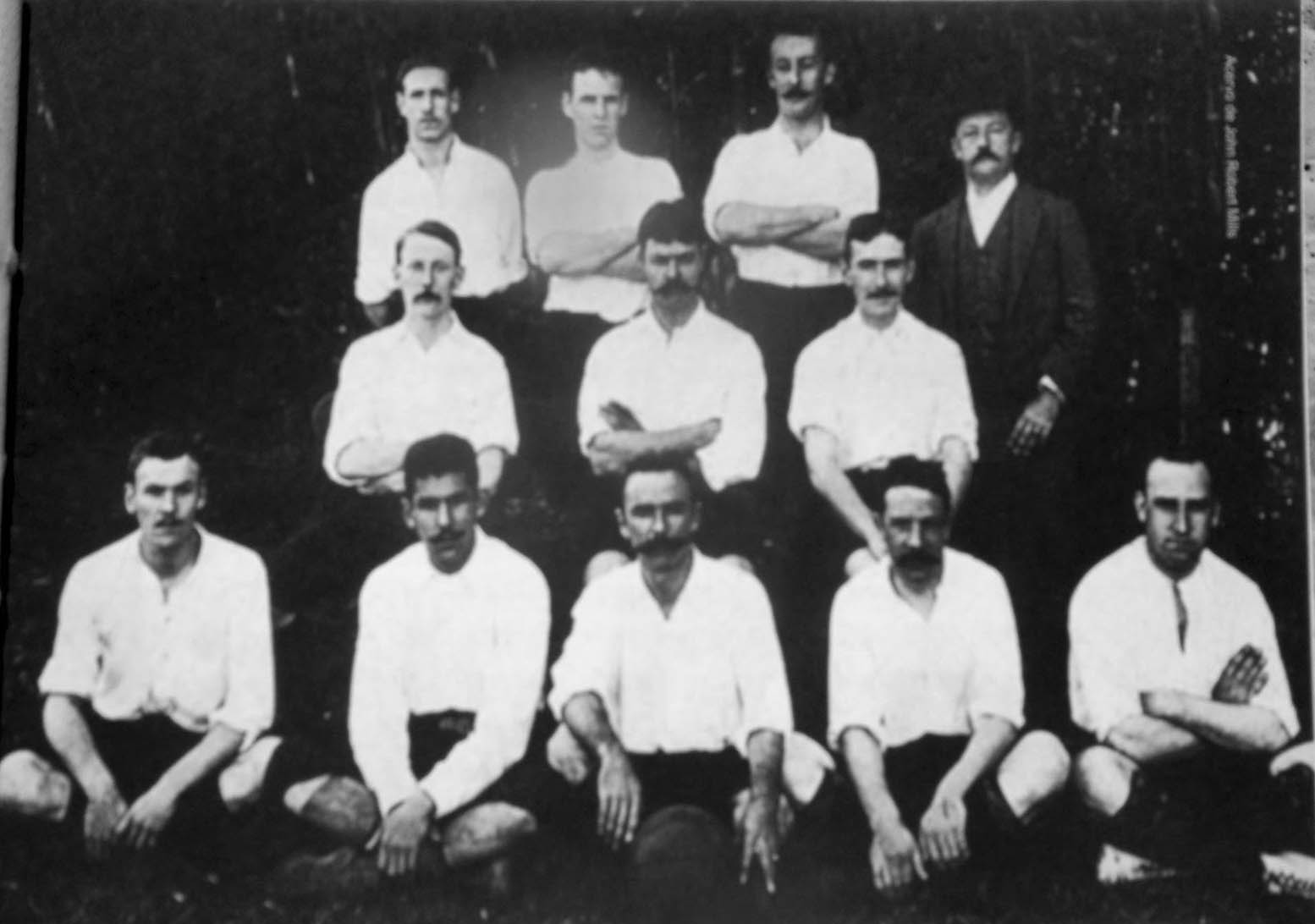
The team of 1904, tri-champion of Paulista football.

1911 was the last successful year of football in the club. SPAC won the last game vs. SC Germania by 2-0, winning the last title for the club. The final game was played on 20 October 1912 against the same club. After that, SPAC retired from official football competitions, although the sport continued being practised at the institution but only for recreation. The club was also a founding member of the São Paulo Tennis Federation.

With football out of competition, rugby became the main sport of the club. In 1932 and 1936 the Brazilian national team played South Africa and England, with most of its players called up from SPAC. Due to World War II rugby came to a hiatus until 1947 when the British players returned to Brazil, although the number of enthusiasts had decreased. In 1948 Jimmy Macintyre retired from rugby but he would never leave the sport, dedicating to manage the team and organizing a tour in 1950.

The Brazilian toured on Uruguay, where the team won the three games played, including the final match by 20-0. By the end of the 1940s, Irish Harry Donovan arrived in Brazil. Donovan would be president of the club (1964–65), then founding the Brazilian Rugby Union in 1963 along with Macyntire.

== Honours ==
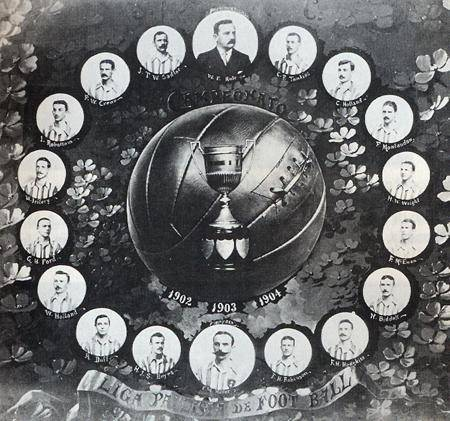
Poster of the SPAC football team honoring the three consecutive titles (1902-04).

=== Football ===
- Campeonato Paulista
  - Winners (4): 1902, 1903, 1904, 1911

=== Rugby union ===
Men's

- Campeonato Brasileiro (10): 1964, 1965, 1966, 1967, 1968, 1969, 1974, 1975, 1976, (Note: Shared with Niterói Rugby FC.) 1999
- Campeonato Paulista (1): 1999
- Recopa (2): 2005, 2008

Women's

- Campeonato Paulista (4): 2006, 2007, 2008, 2009
