= Brazilian Rugby Confederation =

Sports governing body in Brazil

Confederação Brasileira de Rugby
- Sport: Rugby union
- Founded: 1963; 63 years ago
- World Rugby affiliation: 1995
- Sudamérica Rugby affiliation: 1988
- President: Martin Jaco
- Website: brasilrugby.com.br

The Brazilian Rugby Confederation (Portuguese: Confederação Brasileira de Rugby, CBRu) is the governing body for rugby union in Brazil, founded in 2010. It is the successor of the União de Rugby do Brasil (founded in 1963) and the Associação Brasileira de Rugby (founded in 1972). It became a member of the International Rugby Board in 1995.

The confederation has six affiliate state federations: Gaúcha (Rio Grande do Sul), Catarinense (Santa Catarina), Paranaense (Paraná), Paulista (São Paulo), Mineira (Minas Gerais), and Fluminense (Rio de Janeiro). Other state federations are unaffiliated with the CBRu.

It organizes the Campeonato Brasileiro de Rugby (Série A / Super 8), Taça Tupi (Série B) and Campeonato Brasileiro de Rugby Sevens.

From 2010 onwards, the Brazilian Rugby Union has been sponsored by Topper and Bradesco.

== See also ==
- Brazil national rugby union team
- Rugby union in Brazil
