= 2004 RCSL season =

The 2004 Rugby Canada Super League season was the seventh season for the RCSL.

== Standings ==
Western Division

Team	Pld	W	D	L	F	A	+/-	BP	Pts
Vancouver Island Crimson Tide	6	6	0	0	249	70	+179	5	29
Vancouver Wave	6	4	0	2	164	101	+63	6	22
Calgary Mavericks	6	4	0	2	182	115	+67	3	19
Fraser Valley Venom	6	3	1	2	152	134	+18	3	17
Edmonton Gold	6	2	1	3	119	161	-42	3	13
Saskatchewan Prairie Fire	6	1	0	5	63	218	-155	0	4
Manitoba Buffalo	6	0	0	6	76	206	-130	2	2

Eastern Division

Team	Pld	W	D	L	F	A	+/-	BP	Pts
Newfoundland Rock	6	6	0	0	259	49	+210	5	29
Toronto Xtreme	6	5	0	1	225	70	+155	6	26
Niagara Thunder	6	4	0	2	161	85	+76	4	20
Ottawa Harlequins	6	3	0	3	96	190	-94	0	12
Quebec Caribou	6	1	0	5	66	172	-106	1	5
Nova Scotia Keltics	6	1	0	5	100	219	-119	1	5
New Brunswick Black Spruce	6	1	0	5	61	183	-122	0	4

== Championship final ==
The Vancouver Island Crimson Tide (Eastern Division champions) defeated the Newfoundland Rock (Western Division Champions) 14-8 in the Championship Final, played in St. John's, Newfoundland and Labrador on 14 August 2004 to win the MacTier Cup.
