= 2003 RCSL season =

Rugby Canada Super League season

The 2003 Rugby Canada Super League season was the sixth season for the RCSL.

== Standings ==
Western Division

Team	Pld	W	D	L	F	A	+/-	BP	Pts
Calgary Mavericks	6	5	0	1	239	110	+129	5	25
Vancouver Island Crimson Tide	6	4	0	2	228	95	+133	5	21
Saskatchewan Prairie Fire	6	4	1	1	186	123	+63	2	20
Vancouver Wave	6	3	0	3	181	127	+54	4	16
Fraser Valley Venom	6	3	1	2	181	150	+31	2	16
Edmonton Gold	6	1	0	5	91	252	-161	0	4
Manitoba Buffalo	6	0	0	6	48	307	-259	0	0

Eastern Division

Team	Pld	W	D	L	F	A	+/-	BP	Pts
Toronto Xtreme	4	4	0	0	188	52	+136	3	19
Newfoundland Rock	4	3	0	1	129	36	+93	4	16
Nova Scotia Keltics	4	2	0	2	54	98	-44	0	8
Ottawa Harlequins	4	1	0	3	45	116	-71	0	4
New Brunswick Black Spruce	4	0	0	4	54	168	-114	1	1

== MacTier Cup ==
The MacTier Cup is awarded to the RCSL Champions. The Calgary Mavericks (Western Division champions) defeated the Toronto Xtreme (Eastern Division Champions) 40–24 in the Championship Final, played in Calgary, Alberta on 26 July 2003. With the win, the Calgary Mavericks became the first team outside of British Columbia to win the MacTier Cup.

=== Game summary ===
July 26, 2003
15:00

Calgary Mavericks; RCSL Western Division Champions	40–24	Toronto Xtreme; RCSL Eastern Division champions

Calgary, Alberta
