= 2005 RCSL season =

The 2005 Rugby Canada Super League season was the eighth season for the RCSL.

== Standings ==
Western Division

Team	Pld	W	D	L	F	A	+/-	BP	Pts
Saskatchewan Prairie Fire	6	6	0	0	207	80	+127	6	30
Vancouver Island Crimson Tide	6	5	0	1	255	86	+169	6	26
Edmonton Gold	6	3	0	3	138	124	+14	2	14
Calgary Mavericks	6	3	0	3	165	135	+30	2	14
Vancouver Wave	6	2	0	4	195	211	-16	5	13
Manitoba Buffalo	6	2	0	4	132	165	-32	3	11
Vancouver Island Raiders	6	0	0	6	63	354	-291	0	0

Eastern Division

Team	Pld	W	D	L	F	A	+/-	BP	Pts
Newfoundland Rock	6	6	0	0	251	74	+177	5	29
Niagara Thunder	6	5	0	1	203	97	+106	5	25
Toronto Xtreme	6	3	1	2	164	114	+50	4	18
Ottawa Harlequins	6	3	1	2	132	120	+12	3	17
Quebec Caribou	6	2	0	4	90	182	-84	1	9
Nova Scotia Keltics	6	1	0	5	99	160	-61	4	8
New Brunswick Black Spruce	6	0	0	6	50	242	-192	2	2

== Championship final ==
The Newfoundland Rock (Eastern Division champions) defeated the Saskatchewan Prairie Fire (Western Division Champions) 26–13 in the Championship Final, played in Regina, Saskatchewan on 13 August 2005 to win the MacTier Cup.
