= 1999 RCSL season =

- East Champions champions: Toronto Renegades
- West Champions champions: Vancouver Island Crimson Tide

1999 MacTier Cup
- Date: July 24, 1999
- Venue: Duncan, British Columbia
- Champions: Vancouver Island Crimson Tide

RCSL seasons seasons
- ← 1998 2000 →

The 1999 Rugby Canada Super League season was the second season for the RCSL.

== Standings ==
Western Division

Team	Pld	W	D	L	F	A	+/-	BP	Pts
Vancouver Island Crimson Tide	6	6	0	0	232	89	+143	0	24
Fraser Valley Venom	6	5	0	1	183	87	+96	1	21
Vancouver Wave	6	4	0	2	143	128	+15	0	16
Manitoba Buffalo	6	2	1	3	121	170	+20	1	11
Calgary Mavericks	6	2	0	4	138	210	-72	0	8
Edmonton Gold	6	1	0	5	122	160	-38	2	6
Saskatchewan Prairie Fire	6	0	1	5	105	200	-95	1	3

Eastern Division

Team	Pld	W	D	L	F	A	+/-	BP	Pts
Toronto Renegades	5	4	1	0	195	38	+157	0	18
Nova Scotia Keiths	5	4	1	0	131	49	+82	0	18
Eastern Ontario Harlequins	5	2	0	3	109	142	-33	2	10
Newfoundland Rock	5	2	0	3	133	111	+22	0	8
Montreal Menace	5	1	0	4	82	165	-83	1	5
New Brunswick Black Spruce	5	1	0	4	70	194	-124	1	5

Note: A bonus point was awarded for a loss of 7 points or less

== MacTier Cup ==
The Vancouver Island Crimson Tide (Western Division champions) defeated the Toronto Renegades (Eastern Division Champions) 23–11 in the Championship Final, played in Duncan, British Columbia on 24 July 1999.

=== Game summary ===
July 24, 1999
15:00

Vancouver Island Crimson Tide; RCSL Western Division Champions	23–11	Toronto Renegades; RCSL Eastern Division champions

Duncan, British Columbia
Attendance:
