= MacTier Cup =

The MacTier Cup is the name of the championship for the top senior men's rugby league in Canada.

Originally awarded to the champion of the Rugby Canada Super League (RCSL), the MacTier Cup was established in 1998 along with the RCSL. The first MacTier Cup Championship match was played between the Vancouver Island Crimson Tide and the Nova Scotia Keiths. Vancouver Island defeated Halifax in that game. The champions of the final RCSL championship were the Newfoundland Rock, who won the cup in 2008 after defeating the Calgary Mavericks 30–6.

Since 2009, the Cup has been awarded to the winners of the Canadian Rugby Championship (CRC). Since the inception of the CRC, the Ontario Blues have won the MacTier Cup six times, The BC Bears have won the Cup two times, while the Prairie Wolf Pack and the Atlantic Rock both have won the cup one time.

== Champions ==
| Year | Champion | Score | Runner-up |
Rugby Canada Super League
| 1998 | Vancouver Island Crimson Tide | — | Nova Scotia Keiths |
| 1999 | Vancouver Island Crimson Tide (2) | 23–11 | Toronto Renegades |
| 2000 | Fraser Valley Venom | 15–9 | Nova Scotia Keltics |
| 2001 | Fraser Valley Venom (2) | 20–14 | Toronto Renegades |
| 2002 | Vancouver Island Crimson Tide (3) | 6–3 | Newfoundland Rock |
| 2003 | Calgary Mavericks | 40–24 | Toronto Xtreme |
| 2004 | Vancouver Island Crimson Tide (4) | 14–8 | Newfoundland Rock |
| 2005 | Newfoundland Rock | 26–13 | Saskatchewan Prairie Fire |
| 2006 | Newfoundland Rock (2) | 28–14 | Saskatchewan Prairie Fire |
| 2007 | Saskatchewan Prairie Fire | 28–12 | Niagara Thunder |
| 2008 | Newfoundland Rock (3) | 30–6 | Calgary Mavericks |
Canadian Rugby Championship
| 2009 | British Columbia Bears (1) | — | Ontario Blues |
| 2010 | The Rock (1) | — | Prairie Wolf Pack |
| 2011 | Ontario Blues (1) | 21–19 | The Rock |
| 2012 | Ontario Blues (2) | — | Prairie Wolf Pack |
| 2013 | Ontario Blues (3) | — | Prairie Wolf Pack |
| 2014 | Ontario Blues (4) | — | Prairie Wolf Pack |
| 2015 | Prairie Wolf Pack(1) | 33–25 | Ontario Blues |
| 2016 | Ontario Blues(5) | — | Prairie Wolf Pack |
| 2017 | British Columbia Bears(2) | 30–29 | Ontario Blues |
| 2018 | Ontario Blues (6) | 22–17 | Atlantic Rock |
