= 1998 RCSL season =

- East Champions champions: Nova Scotia Keiths
- West Champions champions: Vancouver Island Crimson Tide

1998 MacTier Cup
- Date: July 11, 1998
- Venue: Halifax, Nova Scotia
- Champions: Vancouver Island Crimson Tide

RCSL seasons seasons
- 1999 →

The 1998 Rugby Canada Super League season was the first season for the RCSL.

== Standings ==
Western Division

Team	Pld	W	D	L	F	A	+/-	BP	Pts
Vancouver Island Crimson Tide	6	5	1	0	257	60	+197	0	22
Fraser Valley Venom	6	5	1	0	209	77	+132	0	22
Calgary Mavericks	6	3	0	3	139	186	-47	1	13
Saskatchewan Prairie Fire	6	3	0	3	145	135	+10	0	12
Vancouver Wave	6	3	0	3	143	150	-7	0	12
Edmonton Gold	6	1	0	5	91	222	-131	0	4
Manitoba Buffalo	6	0	0	6	123	243	-120	1	1

Eastern Division

Team	Pld	W	D	L	F	A	+/-	BP	Pts
Nova Scotia Keiths	3	3	0	0	61	22	+39	0	12
Newfoundland Rock	3	2	0	1	82	60	+22	1	9
New Brunswick Black Spruce	3	1	0	2	41	66	-25	1	5
Montreal Olympiques	3	0	0	3	46	82	-36	1	1

Note: A bonus point was awarded for a loss of 7 points or less

== MacTier Cup ==
The Vancouver Island Crimson Tide (Western Division champions) defeated the Nova Scotia Keiths (Eastern Division Champions) 28–8 to win the MacTier Cup, played in Halifax, Nova Scotia on 11 July 1998.

=== 1998 MacTier Cup Final ===
1998-07-11
15:00

Vancouver Island Crimson Tide; RCSL Western Division Champions	dft.	Nova Scotia Keiths; RCSL Eastern Division champions

Halifax, Nova Scotia
