= 2002 RCSL season =

The 2002 Rugby Canada Super League season was the fifth season for the RCSL.

== Standings ==
Western Division

Team	Pld	W	D	L	F	A	+/-	BP	Pts
Vancouver Island Crimson Tide	5	4	0	1	140	65	+75	1	17
Fraser Valley Venom	5	4	0	1	117	56	+61	0	16
Vancouver Wave	5	3	0	2	121	78	+43	2	14
Calgary Mavericks	5	3	0	2	106	68	+38	0	12
Saskatchewan Prairie Fire	5	1	0	4	79	134	-55	1	5
Edmonton Gold	5	0	0	5	48	210	-162	1	1

Eastern Division

Team	Pld	W	D	L	F	A	+/-	BP	Pts
Newfoundland Rock	6	6	0	0	159	58	+101	0	24
Toronto Renegades	6	5	0	1	227	58	+169	0	20
The Academy (RCSL)	6	3	0	3	125	106	+19	2	14
Ottawa Harlequins	6	3	0	3	82	176	-94	1	13
Nova Scotia Keltics	6	2	0	4	81	152	-71	1	9
Montreal Menace	6	1	0	5	58	84	-26	4	8
New Brunswick Black Spruce	6	1	0	5	76	174	-98	2	6

== Championship final ==
The Vancouver Island Crimson Tide (Western Division champions) defeated the Newfoundland Rock (Eastern Division Champions) 6-3 in the Championship Final, played in St. John's, Newfoundland on 27 July 2002.
