= 2006 RCSL season =

The 2006 Rugby Canada Super League season was the ninth season for the RCSL.

== Standings ==
Western Division

Team	Pld	W	D	L	F	A	+/-	BP	Pts
Saskatchewan Prairie Fire	4	4	0	0	201	50	+151	4	20
Edmonton Gold	4	2	0	2	85	97	-12	1	9
Calgary Mavericks	4	2	0	2	78	121	-43	1	9
BC Wave	4	1	0	3	72	139	-67	2	6
Vancouver Island Crimson Tide	4	1	0	3	76	105	-29	1	5

Eastern Division

Team	Pld	W	D	L	F	A	+/-	BP	Pts
Newfoundland Rock	6	6	0	0	330	52	+278	5	29
Niagara Thunder	6	5	0	1	215	101	+114	4	24
Ottawa Harlequins	6	3¹	0	3	119	148	-29	3	15
New Brunswick Black Spruce	6	2	0	4	105	140	-35	3	11
Toronto Xtreme	6	2	0	4¹	71	179	-108	1	9
Quebec Caribou	6	2	0	4	77	161	-84	0	8
Nova Scotia Keltics	6	1	0	5	23	219	-136	1	5

¹ The Toronto Xtreme failed to fulfill their fixture against the Ottawa Harlequins. The Harlequins were credited with a 10–0 victory.

== Championship final ==
The Newfoundland Rock (Eastern Division champions) defeated the Saskatchewan Prairie Fire (Western Division Champions) 28–14 in the Championship Final, played in St. John's, Newfoundland and Labrador on 5 August 2006. Newfoundland and Labrador Premier Danny Williams presented the Rock with the MacTier Cup, indicative of national rugby supremacy.
