= 2007 RCSL season =

The 2007 Rugby Canada Super League season was the tenth season for the RCSL.

== Standings ==
Western Conference

| Team | Pld | W | D | L | F | A | +/- | BP | Pts |
|---|---|---|---|---|---|---|---|---|---|
| Saskatchewan Prairie Fire | 4 | 4 | 0 | 0 | 127 | 65 | +62 | 3 | 19 |
| Edmonton Gold | 4 | 3 | 0 | 1 | 87 | 62 | +25 | 3 | 15 |
| Calgary Mavericks | 4 | 2 | 0 | 2 | 91 | 99 | -8 | 2 | 10 |
| Vancouver Island Crimson Tide | 4 | 1 | 0 | 3 | 78 | 66 | +12 | 2 | 6 |
| BC Wave | 4 | 0 | 0 | 4 | 54 | 145 | -91 | 1 | 1 |

Eastern Conference

| Team | Pld | W | D | L | F | A | +/- | BP | Pts |
|---|---|---|---|---|---|---|---|---|---|
| Niagara Thunder | 6 | 6 | 0 | 0 | 219 | 58 | +161 | 4 | 28 |
| Newfoundland Rock | 6 | 5 | 0 | 1 | 276 | 72 | +204 | 5 | 25 |
| Ottawa Harlequins | 6 | 3 | 0 | 3 | 172 | 146 | +26 | 4 | 16 |
| Toronto Xtreme | 6 | 3 | 0 | 3 | 100 | 219 | -119 | 2 | 14 |
| New Brunswick Black Spruce | 6 | 1 | 1 | 4 | 113 | 168 | -55 | 3 | 9 |
| Quebec Caribou | 6 | 1 | 1 | 4 | 95 | 201 | -106 | 1 | 7 |
| Nova Scotia Keltics | 6 | 1 | 0 | 5 | 73 | 184 | -111 | 1 | 5 |

Note: 4 points for a win, 2 points for a draw, 1 bonus point for a loss by 7 points or less, 1 bonus point for scoring 4 tries or more.

== Championship final ==
The championship game took place August 18, 2007 between the Niagara Thunder and the Saskatchewan Prairie Fire in Regina, at the Regina Rugby Park. The game was won by Saskatchewan Prairie Fire by a score of 28–12.
