= 2000 RCSL season =

The 2000 Rugby Canada Super League season was the third season for the RCSL.

== Standings ==
Western Division

Team	Pld	W	D	L	F	A	+/-	BP	Pts
Fraser Valley Venom	5	4	0	1	150	88	+62	1	17
Manitoba Buffalo	5	4	0	1	123	103	+20	1	17
Vancouver Island Crimson Tide	5	3	0	2	142	92	+50	2	14
Calgary Mavericks	5	2	0	3	99	101	-2	2	10
Edmonton Gold	5	2	0	3	109	135	-26	1	9
Saskatchewan Prairie Fire	5	0	0	5	92	181	-89	2	2

Eastern Division

Team	Pld	W	D	L	F	A	+/-	BP	Pts
Nova Scotia Keltics	5	5	0	0	135	74	+61	0	20
Toronto Renegades	5	4	0	1	200	64	+136	1	17
Montreal Menace	5	3	0	2	136	106	+30	0	12
Newfoundland Rock	5	2	0	3	109	106	+3	1	9
New Brunswick Black Spruce	5	1	0	4	101	205	-104	1	5
Eastern Ontario Harlequins	5	0	0	5	74	223	-149	1	1

Note: A bonus point was awarded for a loss of 7 points or less

== Championship final ==
The Fraser Valley Venom (Western Division champions) defeated the Nova Scotia Keltics (Eastern Division Champions) 15–9 in the Championship Final, played in Halifax, Nova Scotia on 22 July 2000.
