= 2001 RCSL season =

The 2001 Rugby Canada Super League season was the fourth season for the RCSL (Rugby Canada Super League).

== Standings ==
Western Division

Team	Pld	W	D	L	F	A	+/-	BP	Pts
Fraser Valley Venom	5	5	0	0	128	84	+44	0	20
Vancouver Island Crimson Tide	5	4	0	1	150	86	+64	1	17
Saskatchewan Prairie Fire	5	3	0	2	143	98	+45	1	13
Edmonton Gold	5	2	0	3	108	145	-37	0	8
Manitoba Buffalo	5	1	0	4	81	134	-53	1	5
Calgary Mavericks	5	0	0	5	79	134	-55	2	2

Eastern Division

Team	Pld	W	D	L	F	A	+/-	BP	Pts
Toronto Renegades	4	4	0	0	143	54	+89	0	16
Newfoundland Rock	4	3	0	1	94	43	+51	0	12
Nova Scotia Keltics	4	2	0	2	48	75	-27	0	8
New Brunswick Black Spruce	4	1	0	3	59	111	-52	1	5
Montreal Menace	4	0	0	4	70	111	-41	2	2

Note: A bonus point was awarded for a loss of 7 points or less

== Championship final ==
The Fraser Valley Venom (Western Division champions) defeated the Toronto Renegades (Eastern Division Champions) 20-14 in the Championship Final, played in Surrey, British Columbia on 28 July 2001.
