= 2008 RCSL season =

The 2008 Rugby Canada Super League season was the eleventh and final season for the RCSL.

== Standings ==
Western Conference

Team	Pld	W	L	D	F	A	+/-	BP	Pts
Calgary Mavericks	4	4	0	0				4	20
Edmonton Gold	4	2	1	1				2	12
Saskatchewan Prairie Fire	4	1	2	1				3	9
Vancouver Island Crimson Tide	4	1	3	0				4	8
Vancouver Wave	4	1	3	0				2	6

Eastern Conference

Team	Pld	W	L	D	F	A	+/-	BP	Pts
Newfoundland Rock	5	5	0	0				4	24
Niagara Thunder	5	3	1	1				3	17
Quebec Caribou	5	3	1	1				3	17
New Brunswick Black Spruce	5	2	3	0				1	9
Nova Scotia Keltics	5	1	4	0				1	5
Ottawa Harlequins	5	0	5	0				0	0

Note: 4 points for a win, 2 points for a draw, 1 bonus point for a loss by 7 points or less, 1 bonus point for scoring 4 tries or more.

== Championship final ==
The championship game took place on August 9, 2008 between the Calgary Mavericks and the Newfoundland Rock in St. John's, at Swilers Rugby Park. The game was won by the Newfoundland Rock by a score of 30-6.
