= 2009 RCNJC season =

- League: Rugby Canada National Junior Championship
- Sport: Rugby union
- Duration: May–July, 2009

Playoffs
- West champions: Vancouver Wave
- East champions: Toronto Rebellion

Championship final
- Venue: Brockton Oval, Vancouver
- Champions: Vancouver Wave

Seasons
- 2010 →

The 2009 RCNJC season was the inaugural season for the Rugby Canada National Junior Championship.

== Standings ==
=== Western Conference ===
Pacific Division
Team	Pld	W	L	D	BP	Pts
Vancouver Wave	4	3	0	1	3	17
Fraser Valley Venom	4	2	1	1	2	12
Vancouver Island Rising Tide	4	0	4	0	1	1

Prairie Division
Team	Pld	W	L	D	BP	Pts
Calgary Mavericks	4	4	0	0	4	20
North Saskatchewan Wolverines	4	2	2	0	1	9
Saskatchewan Prairie Fire	4	0	4	0	0	0

=== Eastern Conference ===
Central Division
Team	Pld	W	L	D	BP	Pts
Toronto Rebellion	4	4	0	0	4	20
Niagara Lightning	4	2	2	0	3	11
Ottawa Harlequins	4	0	4	0	0	0

Atlantic Division
Team	Pld	W	L	D	BP	Pts
Newfoundland Rock	4	4	0	0	4	20
Nova Scotia Keltics	4	2	2	0	1	9
New Brunswick Timber	4	0	3	0	0	-4

Note: 4 points for a win, 2 points for a draw, 1 bonus point for a loss by 7 points or less, 1 bonus point for scoring 4 tries or more.

== Playoffs ==
Conference Finals; July 25/26
PRA1	Calgary Mavericks	5
PAC1	Vancouver Wave	51
ATL1	Newfoundland Rock	7
CEN1	Toronto Rebellion	23

Finals: August 1 Brockton Oval, Vancouver
PAC1	Vancouver Wave	41
CEN1	Toronto Rebellion	21

== Championship final ==
The championship game was hosted in Vancouver, British Columbia and took place between the West Champion, Vancouver Wave and the East Champion, Toronto Rebellion. The Wave won the game by a score of 41 to 21.

August 1, 2009
3:00PM

Vancouver Wave	41–21	Toronto Rebellion

Brockton Oval, Vancouver, British Columbia
