= 2010 RCNJC season =

- League: Rugby Canada National Junior Championship
- Sport: Rugby union
- Duration: May–July, 2010

Playoffs
- Western champions: Vancouver Wave
- Western runners-up: Saskatchewan
- Eastern champions: Newfoundland Rock
- Eastern runners-up: Niagara Thunder

Championship final
- Venue: Swilers Rugby Complex, St. John's, Newfoundland and Labrador
- Champions: Newfoundland Rock

Seasons
- ← 2009

The 2010 RCNJC season was the second and final season for the Rugby Canada National Junior Championship.

== Standings ==
=== Western Conference ===
Pacific Division
Team	Pld	W	L	D	BP	Pts
Vancouver Wave	4	4	0	0	3	19
Fraser Valley Venom	4	2	2	0	6	14
Vancouver Island Rising Tide	4	0	4	0	0	0

Prairie Division
Team	Pld	W	L	D	BP	Pts
Saskatchewan	2	2	0	0	2	10
Alberta	2	1	1	0	3	7
Manitoba	2	0	2	0	0	0

=== Eastern Conference ===
Central Division
Team	Pld	W	L	D	BP	Pts
Niagara Lightning	2	2	0	0	2	10
Ottawa Harlequins	2	0	2	0	0	0

Atlantic Division
Team	Pld	W	L	D	BP	Pts
Newfoundland Rock	2	2	0	0	2	10
Quebec Caribou	2	1	1	0	1	5
Nova Scotia Keltics	2	1	1	0	1	5
New Brunswick Timber	2	0	2	0	0	0

Note: 4 points for a win, 2 points for a draw, 1 bonus point for a loss by 7 points or less, 1 bonus point for scoring 4 tries or more.

== Playoffs ==
Conference Finals; July 10/17
PRA	Saskatchewan	14
PAC	Vancouver Wave	84
ATL	Newfoundland Rock	20
CEN	Niagara Thunder	8

Finals; July 31
PAC	Vancouver Wave	10
ATL	Newfoundland Rock	13
