= Rugby Canada National Junior Championship =

Canadian amateur rugby union competition

- Sport: Rugby union
- Founded: 2009
- Ceased: 2010
- No. of teams: 12
- Country: Canada
- Last champion: Newfoundland Rock
- Official website: Official website

The Rugby Canada National Junior Championship was an amateur rugby union competition in Canada. It only lasted two seasons, 2009 and 2010. The 2009 champion was the Vancouver Wave, and the 2010 championship went to the Newfoundland Rock.

The league was created when Rugby Canada disbanded the Rugby Canada Super League (RCSL) and replace it with a new under-20 league. The league consisted of 12 teams, and was broken up into four divisions; Pacific, Prairie, Central, and Atlantic.

The league was intended to train, test, and get young rugby players ready so that someday they will be able to compete for the Canadian national rugby union team.

== Teams ==
=== Western Conference ===
Division	Team	City	Years
Pacific	Fraser Valley Venom	Abbotsford, British Columbia	2009–2010
Pacific	Vancouver Island Rising Tide	Victoria, British Columbia	2009–2010
Pacific	Vancouver Wave	Vancouver, British Columbia	2009–2010
Prairie	Calgary Mavericks	Calgary, Alberta	2009
Prairie	Alberta	Calgary, Alberta	2010
Prairie	Saskatchewan Prairie Fire	Regina, Saskatchewan	2009
Prairie	Saskatchewan	Regina, Saskatchewan	2010
Prairie	North Saskatchewan Wolverines	Saskatoon, Saskatchewan	2009
Prairie	Manitoba	Winnipeg, Manitoba	2010

=== Eastern Conference ===
Division	Team	City	Years
Central	Niagara Lightning	Burlington, Ontario	2009–2010
Central	Ottawa Harlequins	Ottawa, Ontario	2009–2010
Central	Toronto Rebellion	Toronto, Ontario	2009
Atlantic	New Brunswick Timber	Fredericton, New Brunswick	2009–2010
Atlantic	Newfoundland Rock	St. John's, Newfoundland	2009–2010
Atlantic	Nova Scotia Keltics	Halifax, Nova Scotia	2009–2010
Atlantic	Quebec Caribou	Montreal, Quebec	2010

== Finals ==
Year	Champion	Score	Runner-up
2009	Vancouver Wave	41–21	Toronto Rebellion
2010	Newfoundland Rock	13–10	Vancouver Wave

== See also ==
- Rugby Canada
- Rugby Canada Super League
- MacTier Cup
