= Gord MacKinnon =

Canada international rugby union player

- Born: 27 August 1958 (age 68) Glasgow, Scotland

Rugby union career
- Position: Flanker
International career
Years	Team	Apps	(Points)
1985-1995	Canada	28	(18)

Gordon "Gord" MacKinnon (born 27 August 1958, Glasgow, Scotland) is a former Rugby Canada flanker.

== Career ==
MacKinnon played for the Pocomo Rugby Club of New Westminster when he won his first cap for Canada against the United States national rugby union team in 1985. During that same year he was a member of the British Columbia side that upset Scotland. A knee injury and subsequent surgery forced him out of the 1987 World Cup but he was back as a Canadian flanker against the Eagles in 1988 and went on to confirm his reputation as an outstanding athlete, fast and very strong.

MacKinnon played in both 1990 World Cup Americas Zone wins over Argentina. Three appearances at Hong Kong Sevens and a member of the Canadian team at the 100th Gala Sevens in 1991. He went on to establish himself as one of the world's best flankers, scoring against Romania and setting up tries against Fiji and France in the 1991 Rugby World Cup as Canada reached the quarter-finals. MacKinnon represented Ex-Britannia Lions amateur Vancouver Rugby Union side.

Rugby World and Post (as it was known at the time) chose MacKinnon, along with other Canadians "Stormmin" Norm Hadley (lock) and Dan Jackhart (prop), as a member of the World XV. Selected for the World XV squad for the New Zealand All Blacks' 1992 Centenary he played in two of the three Tests. MacKinnon made his fourth appearance at the 1992 Hong Kong Sevens, where he scored six tries and later played on the winning side for the June 1992 Ca-Am in Denver. On that occasion he and wing Scott MacKinnon became the first two brothers to appear on the same team for Canada.

Gord played against England at Wembley Stadium and was the only player to start in all 18 games at the 1993 Canberra, Fiji, Hong Kong and Rugby World Cup Sevens events, leading the way with eight tries in all. That year his 15-a-side contribution was limited by a slow-to-heal foot fracture and his only Test appearance was against England in Nepean, when he scored a memorable try. He resumed for the 1994 Hong Kong Sevens and played against the United States, earning his 17th cap. Gord received his 28th and final cap on 3 June 1995 against South Africa in Port Elizabeth.

As of last year, another prestigious title was added to MacKinnons sporting record, when he placed first the Masters (50-54) division of the Reebok CrossFit Games.

Over his international career he has scored four tries (Japan 1991, Romania 1991, England 1993 and Argentina 1995).

In 2011 Gord qualified to participate in the 2011 CrossFit Games in California. he won the Masters 50-54 division.

In July 2012, MacKinnon successfully defended his title at the CrossFit Games, cementing a 2-year winning streak in the masters (50–54) division. He qualified in the subsequent years, but withdrew due to injuries before the Games in from 2013 to 2016. He returned to the CrossFit Games in 2019 and took second in the 60+ masters division, but was later awarded first place via the original winner's failed drug test.

== See also ==
- Rugby Canada
- British Columbia Rugby Union
- Vancouver Rugby Union
