= Winston Stanley (rugby union, born 1974) =

Canada international rugby union player

- Born: Winston Ulysses Stanley; July 14, 1974 (age 52) Victoria, British Columbia
- Height: 6 ft 1 in (1.85 m)
- Weight: 184 lb (83 kg; 13.1 st)

Rugby union career
- Position: Wing
Senior career
Years	Team	Apps	(Points)
2000–2001	Leicester Tigers	16	(30)
2001–2003	Leeds Tykes	10	(15)
International career
Years	Team	Apps	(Points)
1994–2004	Canada	66	(123)

Winston Ulysses Stanley (born July 14, 1974 in Victoria, British Columbia) is a Canadian rugby union player. He played wing for University of British Columbia, James Bay Athletic Association and Vancouver Kats in Canada before later moving to English club Leicester Tigers.

He earned 66 caps for Canada. He made his debut on May 21, 1994 against the United States. He played at the 1995 Rugby World Cup finals and the 2003 Rugby World Cup finals.

Stanley was part of the Leicester Tigers team that won the Heineken Cup, Zurich Premiership, and the Championship play-off in 2001. Stanley started the victorious 2001 Heineken Cup Final for Leicester.

He retired from international rugby following the 2003 Rugby World Cup. In 2004 he was named as player/coach for the Velox Valhallians club in Victoria.

Since then, he has coached Edmonton Gold in the Rugby Canada Super League and the Vancouver Island Crimson Tide Under-20 men's squad. For the 2013-14 rugby season, he was a coach with the University of Victoria Vikes team. He has since worked in numerous school coaching rugby all around Victoria and Canada.

He is currently Director of Rugby at Glenlyon Norfolk School in Victoria. In 2014 he returned to Velox and was named head coach for the Velox Valhallians.

Winston Stanley, was inducted into the Canada Rugby Hall of Fame. He played in three Rugby World Cups and holds the record for most tries scored for Canada with 24. He also played professional rugby for Blackheath, Worcester Warriors and Leeds Tykes.
