= United Rugby Club =

(Canada) United Rugby
- Full name: United Rugby Club
- Union: Fraser Valley Rugby Union
- Founded: 2005
- Location: Coquitlam, British Columbia
- Ground: Hume Park
1st kit	2nd kit

First match
- Surrey Beavers 10 - 37 United Rugby Club (10 September 2005)

Largest win
- S.F.U. 0 - 50 United Rugby Club (4 March 2006)

Official website
- www.unitedrugby.ca

United Rugby is a Canadian rugby union club that is based in the Lower Mainland of British Columbia, representing the cities of Coquitlam, Port Coquitlam, Port Moody, and New Westminster. It was formed in 2005 with the joining of the Pocomo RFC and the Douglas College RFC.

United Rugby fields men's teams in Divisions 1 and 2, and Under 23 teams.

a Women's team is fielded in Division 1, and they are the current reigning Champions for the 2016/2017 season.

United Rugby is also host to a mini-rugby program consisting of players age 3-11, and a Junior program for players age 12-17.

== Facilities ==
Home Venues

- Hume Park, New Westminster
- Coquitlam Town Centre, Coquitlam

Clubhouse - 921 Sherwood Avenue, Coquitlam, B.C.

== Men's Practices ==
Mondays 6:30	Maple Creek Middle School	3700 Hastings Street, Coquitlam
Thursdays 7:00	Coquitlam Town Centre	1299 Pinetree Way Coquitlam

== Women's Practices ==
Mondays 7:30	Maple Creek Middle School	3700 Hastings Street, Coquitlam
Thursdays 7:00	Coquitlam Town Centre	1299 Pinetree Way, Coquitlam

== Pocomo History ==
Over forty years ago a group of enthusiasts led by Gordon Eddy and Jack Cole met at the Port Arms Hotel and decided to establish a rugby club outside of the traditional Vancouver area. The idea was to foster the development of the game in the Port Moody, Coquitlam and Port Coquitlam; thus the creation of the Pocomo Rugby Club.

Vic Coulter (1917–2001) was chosen to be the first President and the Club has experienced a relatively health existence ever since its 1963 inception. Although the Club has never had access to significant finances, industrious members have done what was necessary to persevere.

Under the Direction of Coulter the Club continued to grow and set as a goal the dissemination of the gospel of rugby throughout the Fraser Valley. In order to do this the Club contacted all the Secondary Schools form Port Moody to Chilliwack and team members organized clinics in order to get recent graduates interested in club rugby. The Club established the annual Outriders Trophy with Richmond Rugby Club, who at the time was the only other club beyond Vancouver city.

All the hard work proved to be successful and in 1973 Coulter and Pocomo helped organize the Fraser Valley Rugby Union. The Fraser Valley Rugby Union launched with thirteen clubs, which included no less than five from the U.S. A few fledgling clubs such as Port Coquitlam, Pitt River, Maple Ridge and the U.S. sides have come and gone, only to occasionally resurface. Pocomo continued to grow as one of the pillars of the Fraser Valley and by 1983 they would field four senior men's teams. The Club has won numerous league championships as well as various members were given the Vic Coulter Service Award, for their contribution to rugby in the Fraser Valley.

In 1985, Pocomo introduced their first Women's side and defeated S.F.U., who hadn't lost a match in three years. This first Women's program didn't last long and by 1988 the program was temporarily shut down. Sticking with their roots, Pocomo has continued to foster rugby in the high schools of the Tri-Cities for both boys and girls. Club members volunteer in both middle school and high school as coaches, referees and managers. The Club has also donated a trophy and organized an annual tournament for the top senior team in the Tri-Cities. This hard work has continued to prove successful and in 2000 Pocomo restarted a Women's side who earned the 2nd division provincial championship. With this success, the women's side moved up into the 1st division league, in 2005 they added a second women's team and won the 1st division Provincial Cup and the opportunity for promotion into the BC Provincial Premier League.

The Club heralds a strong tradition of players and alumni who are hard, dedicated workers. Club honours began when Bill Christie received the Stroess Trophy in 1966, since then members such as Gordon Eddy, Bill Turpin, Ken Yates and Ian (Onion) Robertson have gone on to win this award. The 2nd division earned the player's first honours winning Dunbar Trophy in 1968.

With the introduction of the Premier league in 1997, Pocomo and several other clubs faced new strains and challenges. Pocomo saw over 20 players retire or defect to Premier clubs, this forced the club to be reduced to two senior men's teams. However, they still fought hard and in 1999, Pocomo returned to the Vancouver Rugby Union where it made it to the 2nd division finals. The continued growth in Premier clubs and premier rugby forced Pocomo to make some difficult decisions and in 1998 Pocomo entered into amalgamation talks with S.F.U. and later Douglas but were unsuccessful at working out the particulars.

Over the next few seasons Pocomo fought hard, but to limited success and in 2005, Pocomo once again was talking with S.F.U. about merging clubs. At the same time a delegation of Douglas members were quietly talking with some of the Pocomo Executive regarding a similar merger. At the end of the season the Pocomo and S.F.U. voted but both were shy of the required majority. Formal talks with Douglas began and a vote was held shortly after. The clubs voted with large positive majority from both sides.

History provided courtesy of United Rugby Club executive member

== Douglas History ==
Douglas logo

The Douglas Rugby Club was established in the spring of 1971 when a group of Douglas College students, organized by Gert Van Niekerk, took part in a 7-a-side tournament hosted by Malaspina College of Nanaimo. That fall, the Douglas College team joined the Pacific Intercollegiate League and finished second with a record of 5-5-1. The team was captained by Howie Martfelt,

In 1972, the team won the Totem Conference Championship, playing against the other community colleges in the province. That year's captain was Dave Jagger. Without suffering one defeat, the team continued as Totem Conference champions for the next two years. By this time, the alumni team had formed and took part in a series of exhibition games against local clubs.

In 1975, the Douglas College Rugby Club entered two teams in the Fraser Valley Rugby Union 2nd Division. In their first year, the A-Side won the championship and was promoted to the 1st Division for the 1976-1977 season. By the fall of 1977, the club had teams in all three divisions of the FVRU and the 1st Division side won both the league and playoff titles. At the end of that season, the club voted to change its name to simply become the Douglas Rugby Club. The college team had ceased to exist, but the club continued to recruit players from the college.

Douglas had enjoyed continued success since its inception, particularly with its 1st Division team. The squad won numerous FVRU league titles and playoff championships in 1981, 1983 and 1992. On more than one occasion, the 2nd and 3rd XV have each been champions. The collegiate team was revived in 1990 and won the Northwest Intercollegiate Rugby Union (NIRU) Championship in 1993.

Douglas first tested the waters in women's rugby in 1974. The team beat Capilano College 36-4 in the Totem Conference Collegiate 7-a-side Tournament. The first serious attempt at women's rugby occurred in the spring of 1977 when a team was formed under the tutelage of Burt Kirby, Mark Andrews and Mark Ovenden. The team was called the Loose Ruckers. They played in the first-ever women's 15-a-side match in the Lower Mainland, on March 6, 1977 against UBC at Jericho Park, losing 8-0.

There was very little competition at this time and, after a couple of years of exhibition games, the team dissolved. Some of the original members included Elanie Benson, Sara Lee Liner, Rita Boon, Barb Kirby, Diana Nygaard, Edie Naylor, and Marge Naylor.

Douglas revived its women's program in the fall of 1991 when a team was entered in the recently formed West Coast Women's Rugby Association (WCWRA). Other teams in the league were Vancouver Rowing Club, Ex-Britannia Lions, and the University of Victoria. Simon Fraser University and the University of British Columbia also had teams playing a series of exhibition matches. During the first year, the Douglas women were probationary club members. They were accepted for full membership by the 1993-1994 season.

The women's program continued to grow stronger, especially with the support of Lou Rene Legge and the Douglas College Athletic Department. In the fall of 1995 the first ever Douglas College Women's Scholarships were awarded to Anne Carnochan and Stephanie Biggar.

With expansion of the WCWRA to twelve teams in 1995, Douglas began the year in 2nd Division. After going undefeated for the first half of that season, the team beat UBC Old Boys 10-8 to gain promotion to the 1st Division. The women enjoyed their most successful season in 1996 with a record of 13-3-1, losing to eventual champions Ex-Britannia Lions in the BC semi-final.

In the fall of 1996, Douglas expanded its women's program to include two teams. The 1st Division squad enjoyed continued success and the 2nd XV won the BC Championship in 1998. The 1st XV, in the re-dubbed Premiere Division, won championships in 2001 and 2002, while the 2nd Division team won a title in 2003 along with the Under-19 Girls.

Perhaps the most successful female player to come out of the Douglas program was Kelly McCallum. Her rugby career began almost by accident. McCallum, still dressed in her soccer gear, showed up early to watch the Douglas men play. Finding only a women's match in progress, she decided to stick around and watch. As the team was short one player, McCallum was asked to fill-in on the wing. Quickly taking to the game, she made her way up the ranks to the National Senior Women's Team. McCallum went on to captain Canada in Edmonton during the 2006 Women's Rugby World Cup, before her retirement.

History provided courtesy of United Rugby Club executive member

== See also ==
- Rugby Canada
  - Canada national rugby union team
  - Rugby Canada Super League
- British Columbia Rugby Union
- Vancouver Rugby Union
- Fraser Valley Rugby Union
