= Rugby union in Canada =

Sport in Canada

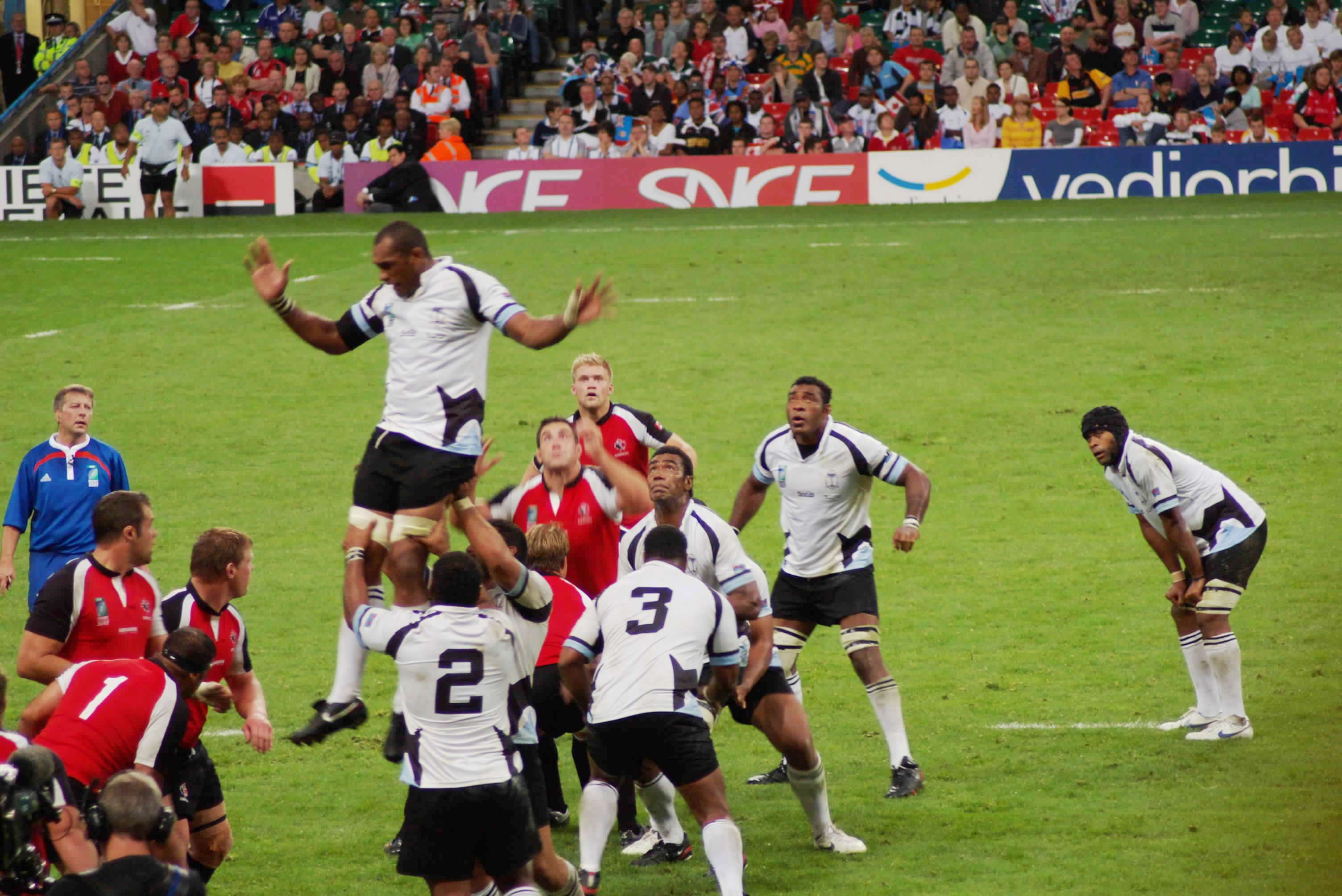
- Fiji playing Canada in the 2007 Rugby World Cup
- Country: Canada
- Governing body: Rugby Canada
- National teams: Men's national team; Women's national team
- First played: 1864, Montreal
- Registered players: 41,202 (total) (Note: Including match officials and coaches); 12,243 (senior); 13,846 (junior); 7,387 (minor)

National competitions
- Rugby World Cup; Rugby World Cup Sevens; Sevens World Series; World Rugby Pacific Nations Cup

Club competitions
- Canadian Direct Insurance Premier League; Rugby Canada National Junior Championship

Rugby union (French: rugby à XV) is a moderately popular sport in Canada. It is a strong participation sport, particularly in hotspots like British Columbia, Atlantic Canada (particularly in Nova Scotia and Newfoundland), Quebec, and Ontario. However, it does not attract the same level of spectator support yet, possibly due to the CFL's success as the dominant football code in the country. Rugby Canada is the administrative body for rugby union in Canada. Each province also has its own union.

As of 2024 Canada has over 12,000 seniors and over 21,000 junior and minor players throughout the country. The Rugby Canada National Junior Championship for under-20 players is organised solely within Canada by Rugby Canada.

Canada is classified by World Rugby (WR) as a tier two rugby nation. Tier two nations do not have a full-time professional domestic structure in place, but they are considered by WR to be the most promising countries in which to expand the sport. The Canadian national men's side have competed in every Rugby World Cup to date, aside from the 2023 Rugby World Cup. The 1991 tournament was their most successful, as they reached the quarterfinals.

Canada's climate is a potential barrier to participation as many grounds are under snow or ice for significant portions of the year, leading to a split season. Canada has long been a regional power in Rugby Americas North, albeit in one of the sport's weaker regions in which there is no tier I nation.

== Popularity ==
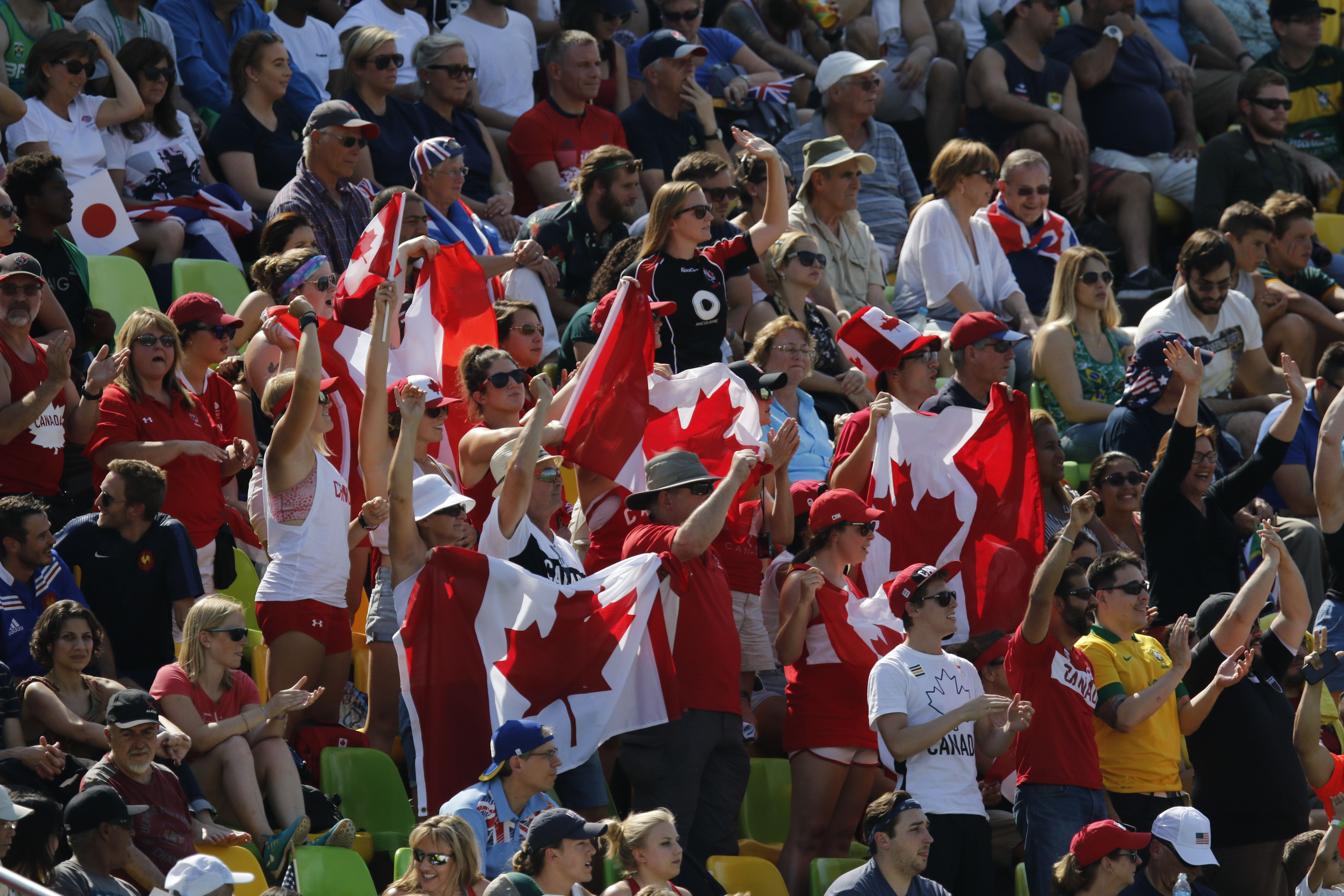
Canadian Rugby Sevens fans at the 2016 Summer Olympics

The sport is played across Canada, with clubs even in isolated regions such as Yukon. It is popular in Ontario, Vancouver Island, the Lower Mainland in British Columbia, and Newfoundland, where rugby is considered to be the most popular summer sport. It is also popular in Prince Edward Island. As of 2024 the island province boasts the highest number of senior players per capita with 5.9 per 10,000 individuals edging out British Columbia at 5.7 per 10,000. (Note: Provincial populations based upon the 2021 Census) As of 2024 Rugby Ontario has the most registered players with 14,291, followed by BC Rugby with 8,998, and Rugby Quebec with 3,915. (Note: Includes minor, junior, senior, visitor, and other players)

Rugby in British Columbia has a strong international flavour. The University of British Columbia played a regular series against the University of California. Representative BC sides have made tours to Japan and England.

Up until just after the Second World War, rugby union was very popular on the west and east coasts. Despite increasing interest in the traditionally Canadian football strongholds of Quebec and Ontario, rugby union weakened in its western and eastern strongholds, particularly the latter. Despite its battle for survival, rugby has managed to maintain a presence in all parts of Canada. Rugby in the Central Provinces has been bolstered partially by immigration from other Commonwealth Countries.

International rugby matches in Canada have seen increasing attendance figures. 20,396 fans came out to BMO Field in Toronto in June 2013 to watch Canada Men take on Ireland, a new attendance record for Canada. Four years later 29,480 watched Canada take on the Maori All Blacks in Vancouver.

== History ==
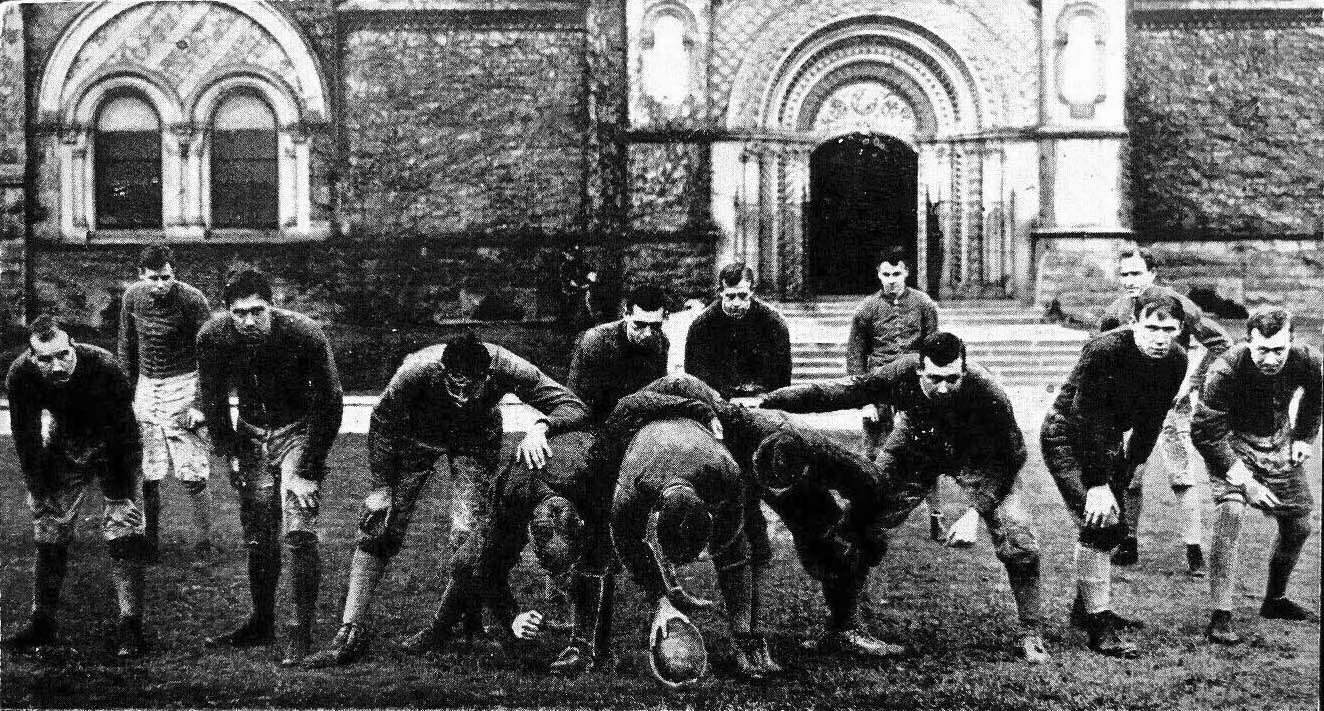
Toronto Varsity rugby team, champions of Canada, c. 1906

There is a considerable overlap between the early history of rugby in Canada, and the origins of Canadian football.

Early forms of rugby football were played in Canada from 1823 onwards, in east Canadian towns such as Halifax, Montreal and Toronto.

Rugby football proper in Canada dates back to the 1860s. Introduction of the game and its early growth is usually credited to settlers from Britain and the British army and navy in Halifax, Nova Scotia and Esquimalt, British Columbia.

In 1864 the first recorded game of rugby in Canada took place in Montreal among artillery men. It is most likely that rugby got its start in British Columbia in the late 1860s or early 1870s when brief mentions of "football" appeared in print.

F. Barlow Cumberland and Fred A. Bethune first codified rules for rugby football in Canada, in 1865 at Trinity College, Toronto, and the first proper Canadian game of rugby took place in 1865 when officers of an English regiment played local civilians, mainly from McGill University.

Rugby is also an ancestor of Canadian football, currently its main competitor. A "running game", resembling rugby, was taken up by the Montreal Football Club in Canada in 1868. By the late 19th century, the game was popular in Vancouver on the west coast. Early Canadian rugby clubs included the following:

- Montreal FC, founded 1868.
- Halifax Tars, founded 1869.
- Winnipeg FC, founded 1879
- Vancouver RFC, founded 1889.

The first major figure in the introduction of rugby to Canada was Alfred St. George Hamersley of Marlborough, an England international who had played in the first Calcutta Cup match in 1871, and he helped establish the game in British Columbia. The game took root there, and as the Canadian Encyclopedia says:

"Vancouver, which, owing to its favourable climate and strong British tradition, became the game's stronghold."

The first recorded game in British Columbia was played on Vancouver Island in 1876, between members of the Royal Navy and the Army. It was played regularly after this in Victoria by local players and sailors on the British ships stationed at Esquimalt.

The first club was formed in 1868. At that time no international agreed set of rules existed and the Rugby Football Union of England would not publish its official set of rules until 1871. Shortly after the game in Montreal, Trinity College, Toronto published the first set of Canadian rugby rules.

The Canada RFU was founded in 1882, and administered Canadian football - after this, Canadian rugby fell back to a provincial level, taking administrative directions directly from the Rugby Football Union in England. Despite such encroachments, rugby remained popular in some parts of Canada, notably British Columbia, Nova Scotia, and Ontario, particularly around Toronto.

As Canada's two main languages are English and French, it has long been influenced by not only the Commonwealth, but the French rugby community.

As early as 1902, a Canadian Men's XV toured the British Isles. And in 1908, the British Columbia rugby union team travelled to California to play the All Blacks.

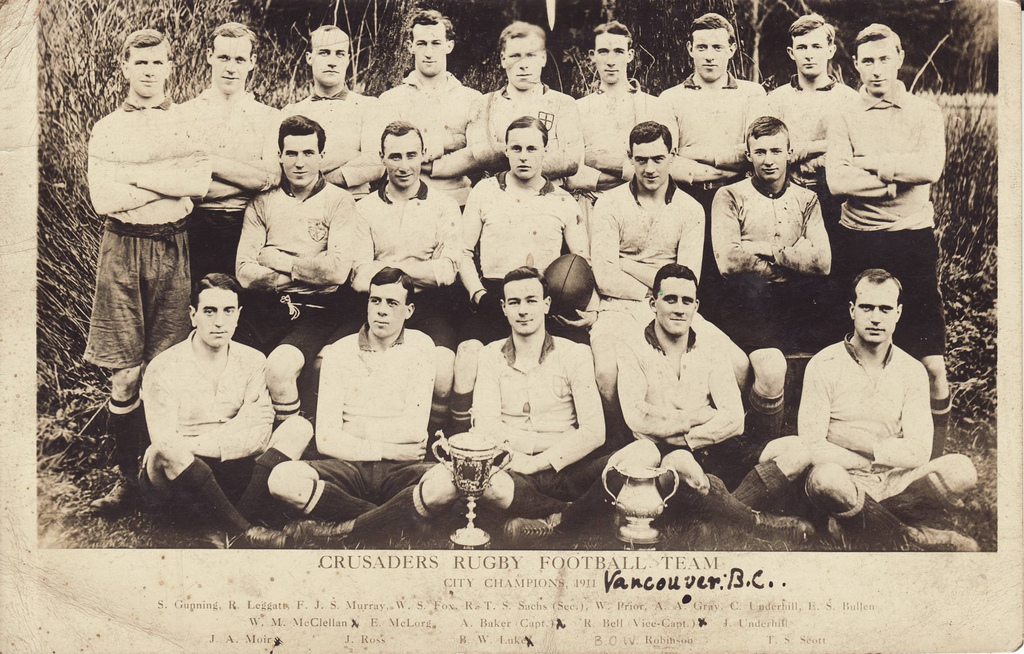
The Vancouver Crusaders RFC, city champions in 1911

There was a brief resurgence in the sport, but that was halted with the onset of World War I. From 1914 to 1919, only in British Columbia and Nova Scotia were there the numbers for semi-regular rugby. In most other areas the game was not played on a regular basis. It has been suggested that some kept rugby alive during the period in an effort to boost morale during the war.

Following World War I, there was an increase in rugby in Canada, as servicemen rejoined their previous clubs. In 1919, a Canadian Services team, the Canadian Expeditionary Force, took part in an Inter-Services Men's Championship played in Great Britain. The Championship consisted of matches played between six service teams from Australia, Britain, Canada, New Zealand and South Africa, with the final played at Twickenham. The Rugby Union of Canada was formed in 1929, which was followed by a men's tour of Japan by a Canadian side.

During World War II the sport was only played on a limited basis, with most games being played involving mainly members of the Commonwealth Forces. In 1949, there were only three active provincial unions — British Columbia, Ontario and Quebec.

Queen's University RFC from Belfast, toured British Columbia in 1953.

In 1958, the Carling Cup was set up, which was won by British Columbia, but which lay dormant between 1959 and 1966. British Columbia retained the cup until Ontario won it in 1971.

Canada men first broke through into the top rank of rugby nations when it beat a touring Scotland side in 1991, and this was followed by an outstanding performance in the Men's 1991 Rugby World Cup, in which they beat Romania and Fiji, and were narrowly beaten by France, reaching the quarterfinals. In 1992, they compounded their success by beating Wales 26–24.

Although it was first introduced into eastern Canada, British Columbia has long been seen as the traditional centre of the Canadian game, and although there have often been as many players in Ontario as BC, there has been a steady drift westward of players. This westward drift has ensured that Canadian rugby now has an outlook to the Pacific Rim, rather than one merely fed by a heritage of largescale British emigration.

=== Rugby and Canadian football ===
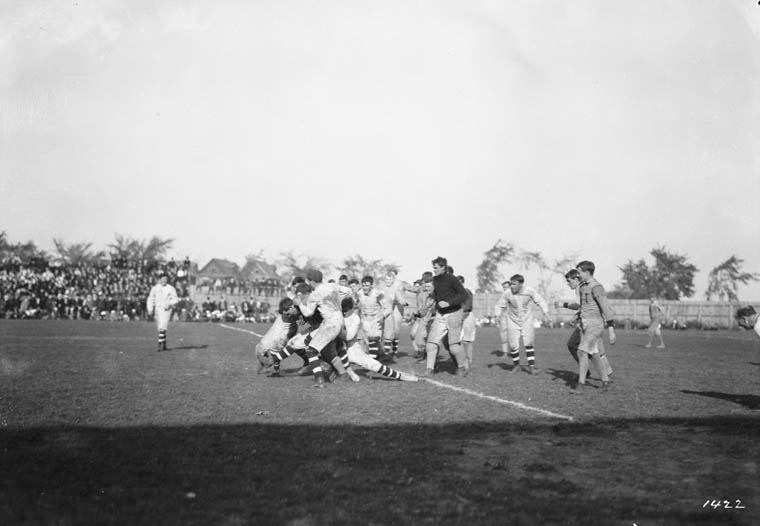
An early Canadian football game between the Hamilton Tigers and an unknown Ottawa team, 1910. Note the lack of helmets.

Confusingly, in Canada, Canadian football has also frequently been referred to as "rugby football", and a number of national and provincial bodies were called "Rugby Football Unions" or "Rugby Unions", such as the Ontario Rugby Football Union, Quebec Rugby Football Union. For example, in the Encyclopedia Canadiana, the entry Rugby Football begins "the Canadian development of rugby union or "English rugger" introduced into Canada in the third quarter of the nineteenth century.", but admits later that "the Canadian game is a radical departure from rugby union". Canadian football is in fact a descendant of the rugby code.

The first documented gridiron football match was a game played at University College, University of Toronto on November 9, 1861. A football club was formed at the university soon afterwards, although its rules of play at this stage are unclear.

In 1864, at Trinity College, Toronto, F. Barlow Cumberland and Frederick A. Bethune devised rules based on rugby football. However, modern Canadian football is widely regarded as having originated with a game of rugby played in Montreal, in 1865, when British Army officers played local civilians. The game gradually gained a following, and the Montreal Football Club was formed in 1868, the first recorded non-university football club in Canada.

This rugby-football soon became popular at Montreal's McGill University. McGill challenged Harvard University to a game, in 1874. It is through this varsity play that the game now known as American football entered the United States.

Predecessors of the Canadian Football League and the present-day governing body Football Canada include the Canadian Rugby Football Union (CRFU), established 1882, and the Canadian Rugby Union, established 1892. Representatives from the Montreal (Rugby) Football club (now known as the Westmount Rugby Club), the Toronto Rugby Football Club and from the Hamilton Rugby Football Club had meetings in Toronto and Montreal. It was decided that the union would continue to use the English rugby rules, and at the end of the season the winning club of the Quebec Championship would play the Ontario Champion for the Club Championship of the Dominion.

This organization (also known at different times as the Canadian Rugby Union), was the forerunner of the Canadian Football League, as rugby football in Canada evolved into Canadian football. To make matters more confusing the word rugby continued to be applied to Canadian football. It was not until 1967 that the original CRU finally cleared up this confusion by renaming itself the Canadian Amateur Football Association; it adopted its current name of Football Canada in 1986.

== International competition ==
Canada is classified by World Rugby (WR) as a tier two rugby nation alongside Fiji, Japan, Romania, Samoa, Tonga and the USA (there are ten tier one rugby nations). In terms of international rugby, Canada has not been so isolated, since European sides touring Australia and New Zealand, and vice versa, would frequently stop off there, in the days before proper long distance jet flight. As early as 1905, Dave Gallaher's "Originals" from New Zealand played there, and a long line of All Blacks sides have played there.

=== Rugby World Cup ===
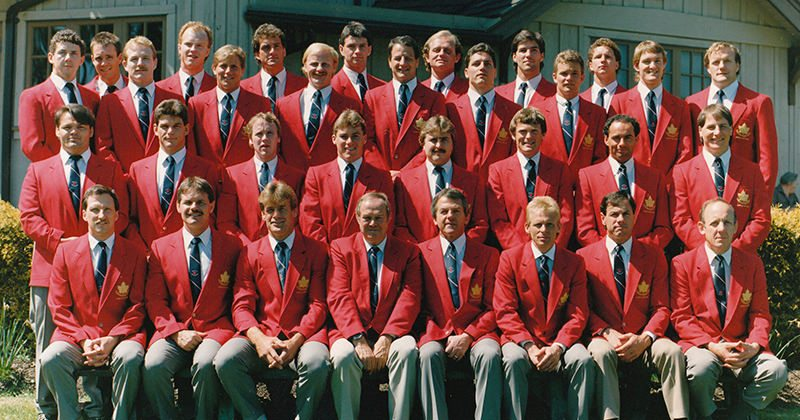
Canada National Rugby Squad, 1987 Rugby World Cup

The Canadian national men's team have competed in every world cup since the first tournament held in 1987, until 2023 when they failed to qualify. The team's best result came during the 1991 tournament, held in the United Kingdom, when they reached the quarter finals beating out Fiji and Romania before narrowly losing 19–13 to France in the pool stage then New Zealand in the quarter final.

Canada managed only one win in the 1987 Rugby World Cup (against Tonga). They also managed only a single win in 1995 Rugby World Cup (against Romania) 1999 Rugby World Cup (against Namibia) and the 2003 Rugby World Cup (against Tonga). Canada could only manage a draw in the 2007 Rugby World Cup (against Japan), but in the 2011 Rugby World Cup managed a win (against Tonga) and a draw (against Japan).

The performance and ranking of the national men's team has been in a steady decline since 1991, and the leadership of the sport has been unwilling, or unable, to make the necessary adjustments to reverse this decline.

Canadian women's rugby has been internationally competitive, ranking in the top five for the last several years.

=== Churchill Cup ===
The Churchill Cup was a tournament conducted from 2003 through 2011, intended to help build depth in rugby in Canada and the United States, and an opportunity to develop new players for the England national men's team. The New Zealand Māori also competed in most of the tournament's editions. Although Canada was one of the three regular men's teams in the Churchill Cup, they never made the final until 2010, losing out to the England Saxons (that country's "A" national side). They also lost to England Saxons in the final of the last Churchill Cup in 2011. Rugby Canada, USA Rugby, and the Rugby Football Union of England all agreed to end the Churchill Cup after the 2011 edition, as both Canada and the USA will be included in WR's international Test schedule starting in 2012.

=== Super Powers Cup ===
In 2004 and 2005 Canada men replaced China in the Super Powers Cup. In 2005 Canada won the tournament beating Japan 15–10. The competition was discontinued in 2005 but representatives of Canada, USA, Russia and Japan have met to discuss reviving the competition, starting in November 2010.

=== Americas Rugby Championship ===
Rugby Canada participated in the Americas Rugby Championship, an annual competition established by WR and designed to help grow the sport in Canada and the USA. It was the successor to the North America 4, established in 2006 for the same purpose. The NA4 involved four regionally-based teams, two each from Canada and the USA. The ARC, launched in 2009, includes four Canadian men's teams:

- BC Bears, representing British Columbia
- Prairie Wolf Pack, representing the Prairie Provinces
- Ontario Blues, representing Ontario
- Atlantic Rock, representing Atlantic Canada plus Quebec

These teams were joined by the Argentina Jaguars, which have now become the country's "A" (second-level) national team, and a "USA Select XV", an "A" national team in all but name.

When the ARC was established, Rugby Canada decided to scrap its former semi-professional national competition, the Rugby Canada Super League.

=== Pacific Nations Cup ===
Starting in 2013, Canada men (along with the United States) has joined the Pacific Nations Cup. The tournament is intended to strengthen the Tier 2 rugby nations along the Pacific Rim by providing competitive test matches in a tournament format.

== Domestic competitions ==
=== Canadian Rugby Championship ===
The Canadian Rugby Championship (CRC) is an amateur rugby union league located in Canada, partially funded by World Rugby. It is the highest level of domestic rugby in Canada.

It has four representative men's teams from regions across Canada, competing for the MacTier Cup. The regular season goes from August to September, and there is no post-season.

The CRC was started in 2009 by Rugby Canada. The league continues to grow every year, with more games being added to the schedule, and the format having changed in each of its first three years, making the league more competitive, and a prospect of becoming professional one day.

=== Canadian Direct Insurance Premier League ===
The Canadian Direct Insurance Premier League (also known as the CDI Premier League) is a provincial rugby union competition contested by eight clubs in British Columbia, Canada. The CDI Premier League is organized by the British Columbia Rugby Union.

The Canadian Direct Insurance Premier League runs from January to April each year. The men's teams that play in the CDI Premier League compete in the Lower Mainland Spray League and the Vancouver Island Elite League from September to December.

The teams compete for the Rounsefell Cup. The Rounsefell Cup was first awarded to Vancouver Rowing Club in 1922, and has been competed for annually ever since.

=== Major League Rugby (2017–2023) ===
In November 2015, the Professional Rugby Organization (PRO Rugby) announced a USA Rugby and World Rugby-sanctioned professional rugby championship. Six teams in "major metropolitan areas in the US Northeast, the Rocky Mountains and California" will play at medium-size venues, with a 10-match schedule from April to July 2016. The league was expected to include Canadian teams upon expansion in 2017, but has since folded. In 2018, the top-level competition of rugby in the United States became Major League Rugby, and the Toronto Arrows were announced to join in the 2019 season.

On November 27, 2023, it was announced that the Arrows would not compete in the 2024 MLR season.

== Age Grade Rugby ==
The Junior Inter-Provincial Championship was started in 1976, and in 1982, Canada started up a junior national men's team, which played Welsh Schoolboys in 1983 and 1986, and England Colts in 1985.

Since 2009, the top age-grade competition in the country is the Rugby Canada National Junior Championship, involving under-20 men's teams. It was established as a replacement for the Super League, and most of the clubs that fielded teams in that league now send under-20 men's teams to the National Junior Championship.

== Women's Rugby in Canada ==
In 1983, the Western Canada Women's Championship was established.

By 1999, thirty women's clubs were registered in Canada.

== See also ==
- Rugby Canada
- Canada national rugby union team
- Sports in Canada
- Canada national rugby sevens team
- Canadian Rugby Championship
