= Julie Foster =

Canadian rugby union player

- Born: Julianna Foster; 12 January 1969 (age 57) Winnipeg, Manitoba
- Height: 167 cm (5 ft 6 in)
- Weight: 68 kg (150 lb; 10 st 10 lb)
- University: University of Regina
- Occupation: Regina Qu'Appelle Health Region

Rugby union career
- Position: Wing
Amateur team(s)
Years	Team	Apps	(Points)
1991-2008	Regina Breakers		
2008-	Regina Rage RFC		
–	Dog River Howlers		
–	Prairie Fire Ultra Sevens sides		
Provincial / State sides
Years	Team	Apps	(Points)
1991-2012	Saskatchewan		
International career
Years	Team	Apps	(Points)
1996-2006	Canada	44	(65)
National sevens team
Years	Team		Comps
1997-2006	Canada		
Coaching career
- Years: Team
- 1995-: High school level
- 2008-: Regina Rage
- 2012: Saskatchewan under-16
- 2012-: Regina Cougars Women's 7s
- 2013-2015: Saskatchewan women's team
- 2018: Saskatchewan under-18
Refereeing career
Years	Competition		Apps
1995-	High school level		
1995-	Senior league (men and women)		
2005	Canada Games		
2013	Western Canada Games		
2016	Canadian Rugby Championships		
Ice hockey career
- Played for: Regina Cougars
- National team: Canada
- Playing career: 1993–1993

Julie Foster is a Canadian rugby union player who participated in three World Cups (1998, 2002, and 2006). Foster also represented Hockey Canada in a two-game series against the United States in 1993.

Born in Winnipeg, Manitoba in 1969, Foster spent her rugby career in Saskatchewan. Early coaches include Leanne Balliett and Kirsten Karwandy. Foster's introduction to rugby began with the Regina Breakers in 1991. That same year she represented Saskatchewan Rugby until 2012. In 2008, she was a founding member of the Regina Rage RFC. Foster also played on the Dog River Howlers and Prairie Fire Ultra Sevens invitational sides.

Foster's first cap was against New Zealand in 1996, though her most memorable game was at her first Canada cup in 1996 when she scored three tries. She scored her first try at the 200 Can-Am test match. The winger also played on the first national sevens team at the 1997 Hong Kong Sevens and earned 10 caps with the program. During her decade long international career, came to an end in a match versus France.

Foster has been an active coach in high school rugby since 1995, while also coaching the under-16 and under-18 at the 2012 and 2018 Western Canadian Championships, respectively. Since 2008, has coached at the club level with the Regina Rage. From 2013 to 2015, she coached the Saskatchewan women's team (one year combined with the Manitoba squad). Since 2012, Foster has coached at the university level with the Regina Cougars women's 7s side. Her fiancé Darren Beaulac coaches the Saskatchewan Women under-18 side; they have a son together.

Foster now works for the Regina Qu'Appelle Health Region.

== Honours and awards ==
- 2000, CIS All Star Ice hockey honours, University of Regina
- 2001, Isobel Gathorne-Hardy Award (ice hockey) recipient
- 2011, Colette McAuley award
- 2019, Rugby Canada Hall of Fame inductee
