= Fletcher's Fields =

Rugby stadium in Markham, Ontario, Canada

Coordinates: 43°55′06″N 79°23′03″W

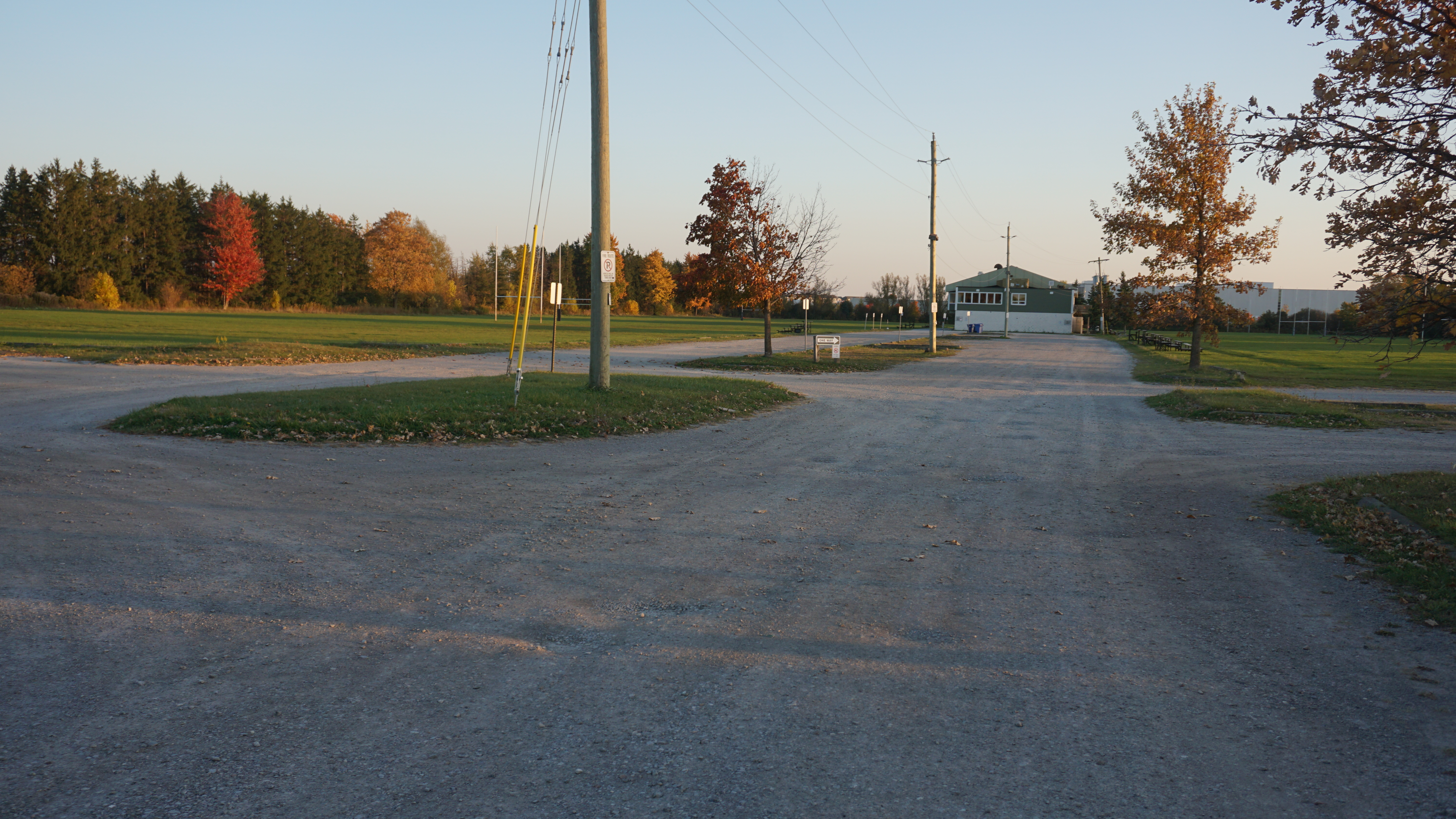
- Interactive map of Fletcher's Fields
- Location: 2743 19th Avenue; Markham, Ontario, Canada
- Capacity: 3,200
- Surface: Grass

Construction
- Opened: 1980

Tenants
- Toronto Rebellion, Toronto Nomads, Toronto Saracens

Fletcher's Fields is a rugby stadium in Markham, Ontario, Canada. There are six rugby fields, but only one with a grandstand for spectators. The club house, with changerooms and a snack bar, is located in the centre of the facility. Parking is located in two lots south of 19th Avenue and one north of the clubhouse.

The field was named for Denis Fletcher, a proponent of rugby in Ontario during the 1950s and 1960s.

It previously served as home to the Toronto Rebellion of the Rugby Canada Super League. The stadium, which seats 3,200 people, has hosted numerous Canada national rugby union team matches in the past was one of the venues for the 2008 Churchill Cup. It also hosted the 2011 Colonial Cup.

The field was sold to the City of Markham in December 2021, with full possession and the end of use for rugby scheduled at the end of October 2024.

== Rugby League ==
In 2011 this venue hosted all Canadian National Rugby League team matches which included:

- Canada vs Jamaica
- Canada vs USA
- Canada vs South Africa

Due to pitch work at Lamport Stadium, Toronto Wolfpack played their home Betfred Championship match against Swinton Lions at Fletcher's Field on May 5, 2018.

== See also ==
- List of rugby league stadiums by capacity
