= VRU =

VRU is an abbreviation of:

- Vapor recovery unit, a means for recycling evaporated fuel.
- Vancouver Rugby Union in Canada.
- Victorian Rugby Union in Australia.
- Verkhovna Rada Ukrainy (Ukrainian: Верховна Рада України, ВРУ), Ukraine's unicameral parliament.
- Vertical reference unit, used for dynamic positioning.
- Violence Reduction Unit, a division of the Scottish police force.
- Voice response unit, a telephony system also known as interactive voice response.
- Vulnerable road user, a concept in road traffic safety.
- Voice Recognition Unit, an accessory for the Nintendo 64
