= Rugby Super League =

Rugby Super League may refer to several rugby football competitions:

== Rugby league ==
- Super League, officially known as the "Rugby Super League", professional rugby league competition in the United Kingdom and France
- Super League (Australia), a defunct rugby league competition in Australia and New Zealand

== Rugby union ==
- Rugby Canada Super League, a semi-professional rugby union competition in Canada
- Rugby Super League (US), an amateur rugby union competition that served as the top-level for clubs in the United States from 1996 through 2012
- Super Rugby, a professional rugby union competition in Australia, New Zealand, and South Africa
