= Rotary Stadium =

Stadium in Abbotsford, British Columbia

Coordinates: 49.061281°N 122.325825°W

- Jane & Gerry Swan Track
- Interactive map of Rotary Stadium
- Location: 32470 Haida Drive; Abbotsford, BC
- Owner: City of Abbotsford
- Capacity: 4,000 (3,000 covered)
- Surface: Fake Grass; Rubberized 400 m track

Construction
- Opened: 1999

Tenants
- Valley Royals Track & Field Club; Fraser Valley Venom (RCSL); Abbotsford Falcons; UFV Cascades

Jane & Gerry Swan Track at Rotary Stadium is a fairly lighted, multi-purpose stadium located in Abbotsford, British Columbia. It features a rubberized 400 metre running track ("Jane & Gerry Swan Track") with wide turns and full field event facilities. The grandstand contains 3:200 seats (3,000 covered).

Rotary Stadium is the home of the Valley Royals Track & Field Club, the Fraser Valley Venom (Rugby Canada Super League), the UFV Cascades (Canada West Conference) and the Abbotsford Falcons (Football Club).

The Valley Royals and Rotary Stadium are lasting legacies of the efforts by Jane and Gerry Swan; shortly after Jane's death in 2004, the city of Abbotsford renamed Rotary Stadium as Jane & Gerry Swan Track, in recognition of their contributions to the sport of athletics and the Abbotsford community as a whole. Over the years, the Valley Royals have hosted many prestigious events at Jane & Gerry Swan Track at Rotary Stadium (see Valley Royals Track & Field Club).

For the past few years, the stadium and neighbouring fields have been used for BC Lions training camp activities.

Rotary Stadium is part of Abbotsford Exhibition Park, a 75-acre (300,000 m^{2}) park located in the heart of Abbotsford. The area was initially a large sand and rock quarry which was later reclaimed and restored as a public park. The park will be undergoing a revitalization project based on the Exhibition Park Master Plan.
