= Winston Stanley =

Winston Stanley may refer to:

- Winston Stanley (rugby union, born 1974), Canadian rugby union footballer
- Winston Stanley (rugby union, born 1989), Australian-born Samoan rugby union footballer
