= Graves-Oakley Memorial Park =

Urban park in Halifax, Nova Scotia

Coordinates: 44°35′48.6″N 63°37′37.4″W

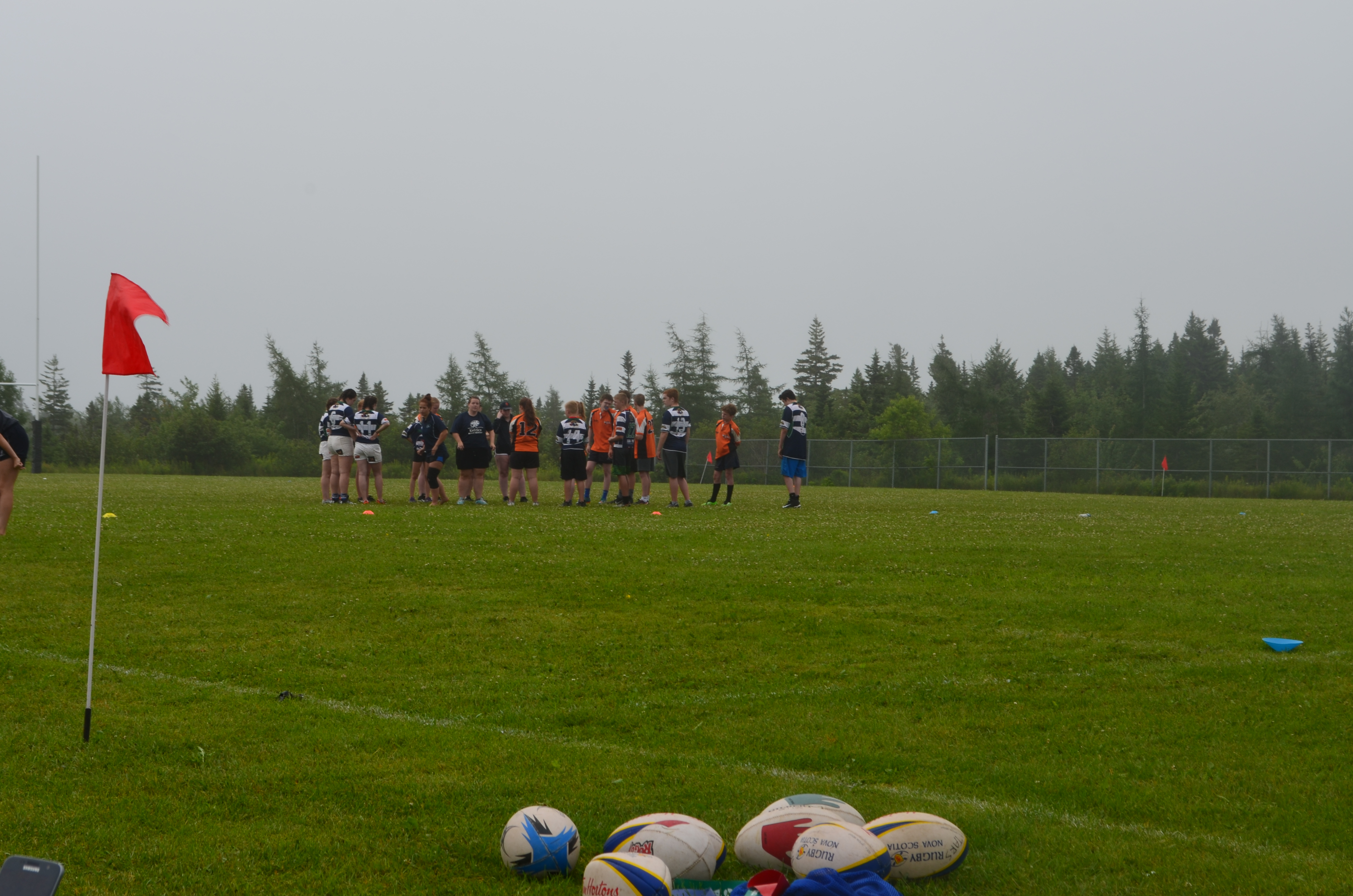
- Graves-Oakley Park
- Interactive map of Graves-Oakley Memorial Park
- Type: Public park
- Location: Halifax, Nova Scotia
- Created: 1988
- Operator: Halifax Regional Municipality

Graves-Oakley Memorial Park is a Canadian urban park and sports field located in Leiblin Park in Nova Scotia's Halifax Regional Municipality.

== Features ==
- Horseshoe
- Football
- Soccer
- Nova Scotia Rugby Union (NSRU)
- Baseball
- Halifax Electric Flyers Association

== History ==
Two young children, brother and sister, became lost in the woods around this area in 1969 during a major snow storm. The community quickly spread the news of the search for these children. The community attempted to organize a search with friends, neighbors, Halifax Police, Spryfield's fire department and J. Albert Walker Ambulance.

The older sister asked her brother to wait on a rock while she continued to look for a way home. He was found early on in the search, but the little girl died due to the winter storm. To make things worse one of the community volunteers became lost himself and died of exposure also.

In 1972, Bill Lockhart, Ken Oakes, and Dick MacDonald, with the assistance of the Emergency Measures Organization of Nova Scotia, formed one of Canadian's best rescue teams, the Waverley Ground Search and Rescue Team as a result of this search.

== Memorial monument ==
In 1980, a memorial monument was placed and a park was built in memory of the 1969 events. on the stone, it reads.

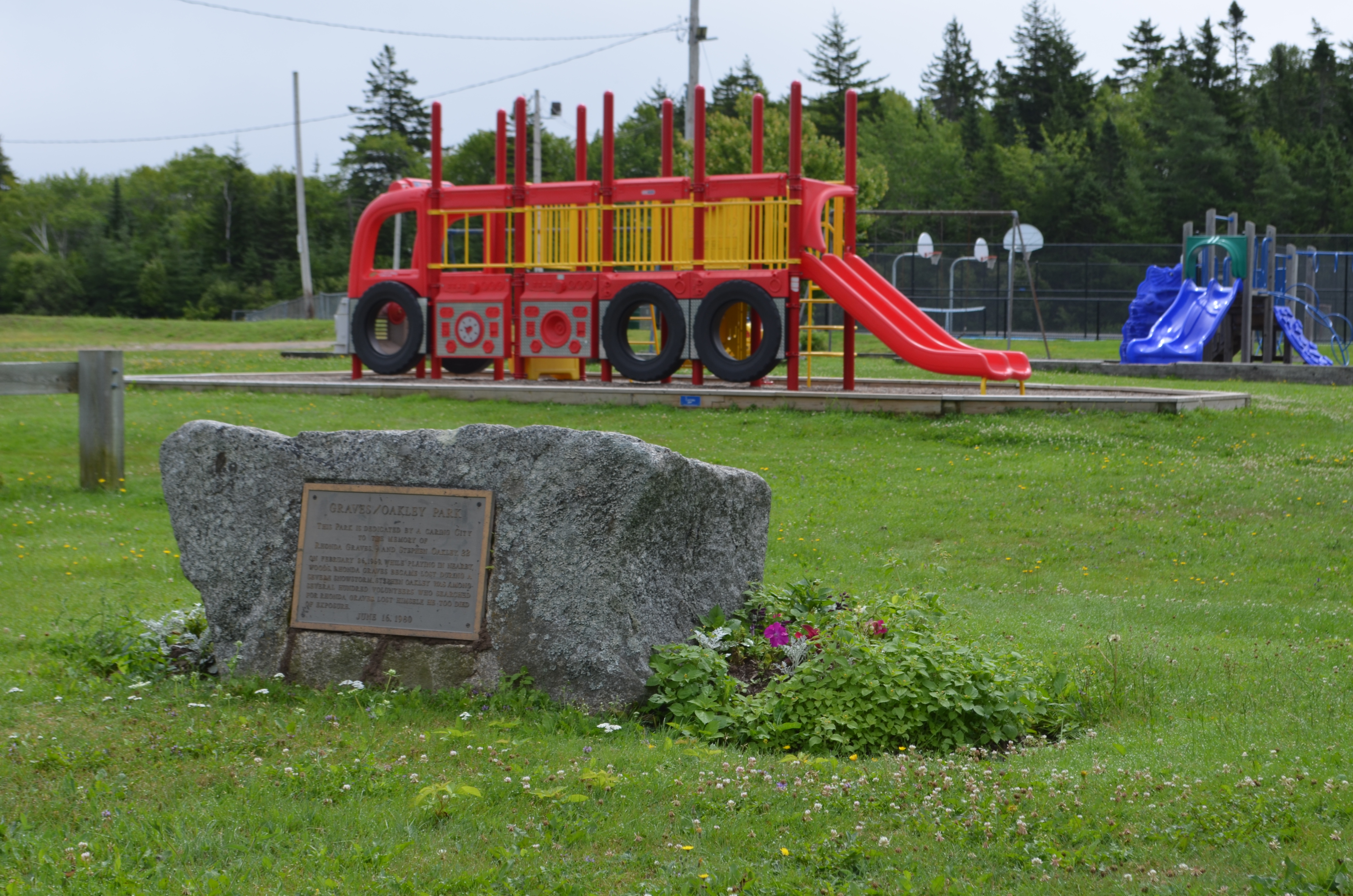
Memorial stone at the Halifax park called Graves-Oakley Park

"This park is dedicated by the caring city to the memory of Rhonda Graves and Stephen Oakley on February 26, 1969, while playing in nearby woods. Rhonda Graves became lost during a severe snowstorm. Stephen Oakley was among several hundred volunteers who searched for Rhonda Graves. Lost himself He too died of exposure. June 16, 1980."
