= Prince Edward Island Rugby Union =

The Prince Edward Island Rugby Union (PEIRU) is the provincial administrative body for rugby union in Prince Edward Island, Canada and a Provincial Union of Rugby Canada.
