= Rugby Nova Scotia =

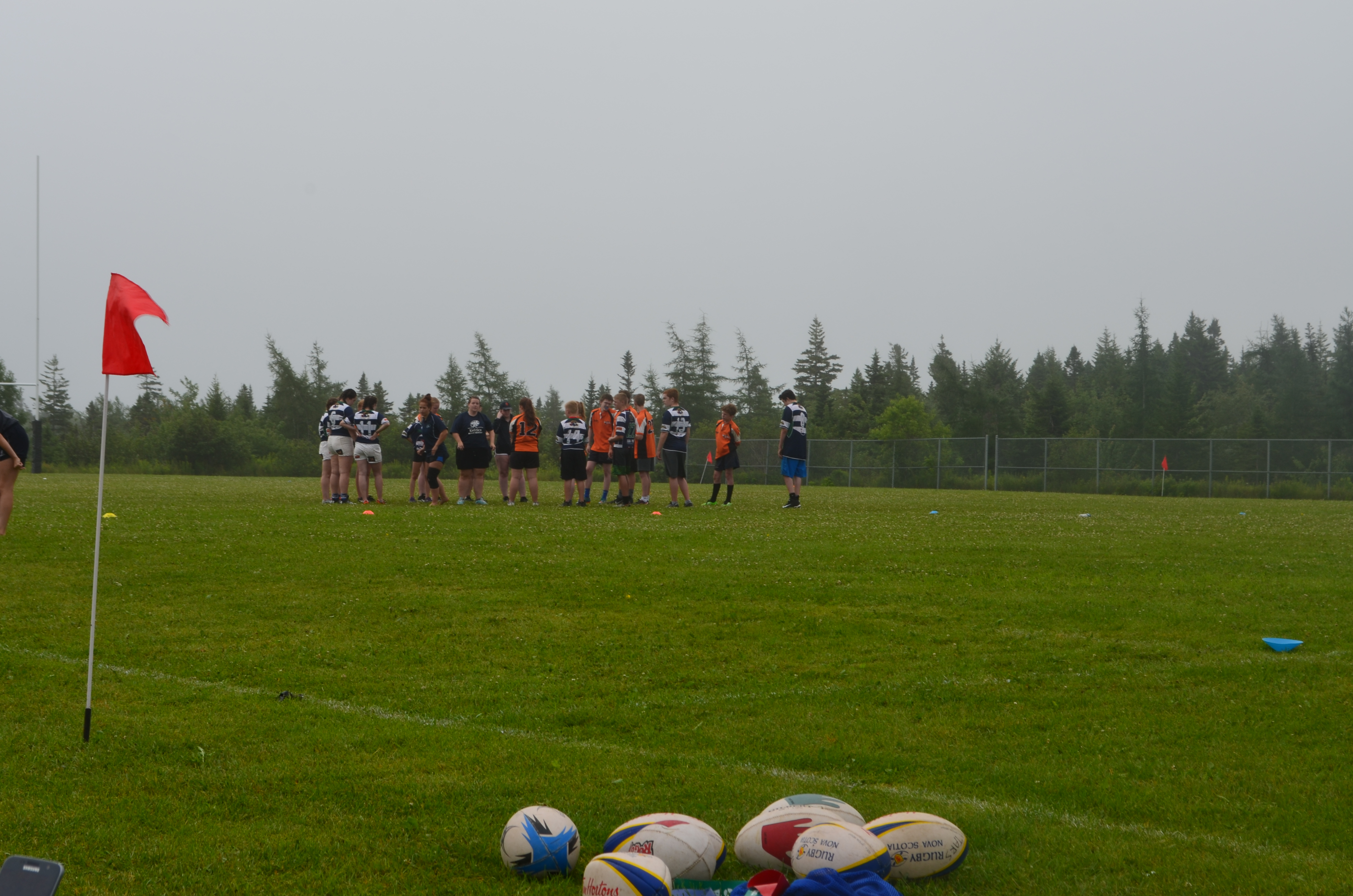
- Full name: Nova Scotia Rugby Union (NSRU)
- Association: Rugby Canada
- Location: Nova Scotia, Canada

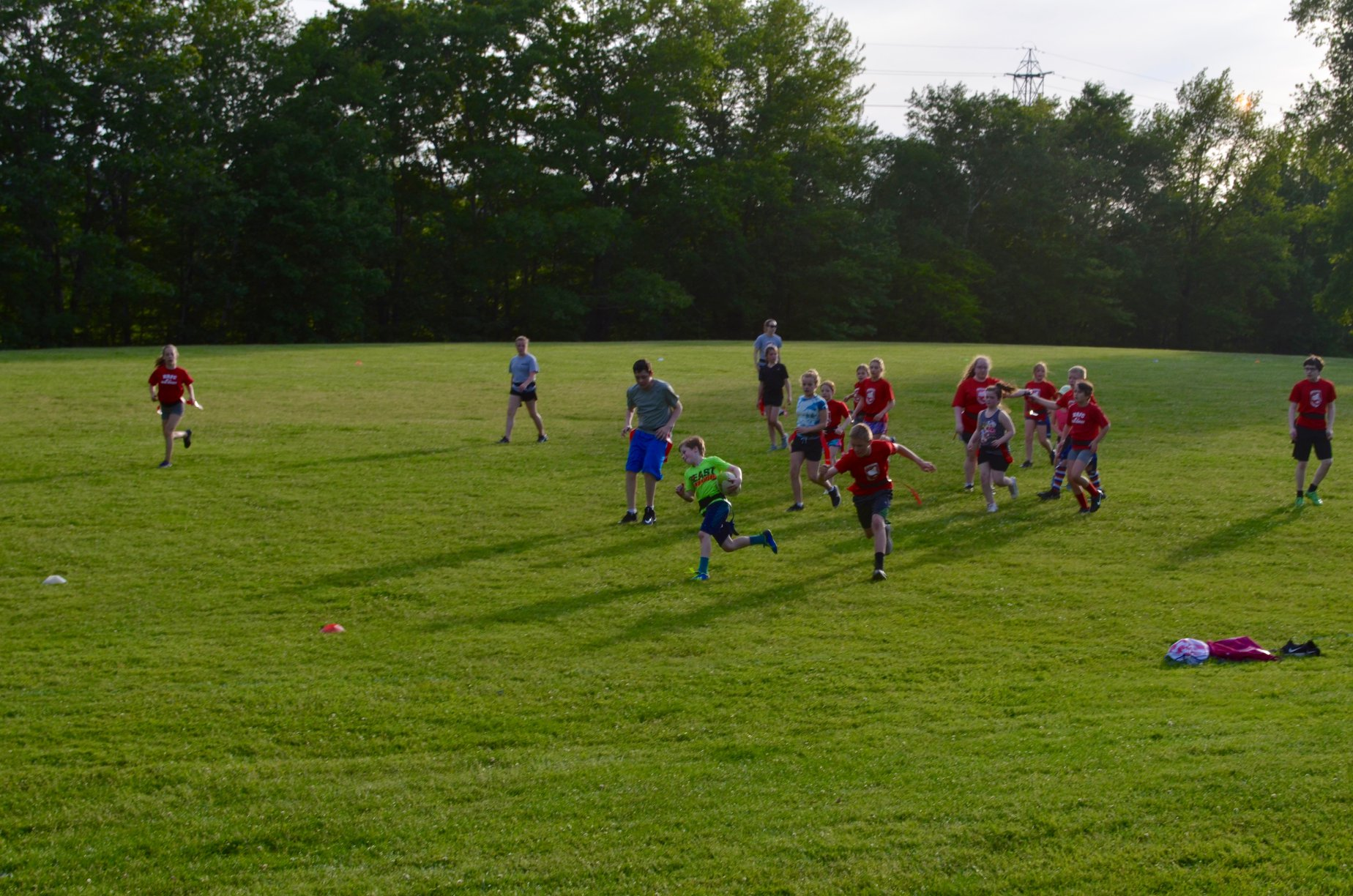
Youth playing Flag Rugby at the Conrose Park in Halifax

The Nova Scotia Rugby Union (ORU) also known as Rugby Nova Scotia is the provincial governing body for the sport of rugby union in the Canadian province of Nova Scotia and a Provincial Union of Rugby Canada. Rugby Nova Scotia governs various levels of rugby (Mini-Rugby, Under-12, Under-14, Under-16, Under-18, Senior, Masters, Non-contact).

== High Performance Program ==
Rugby Nova Scotia is represented on the National stage by the Nova Scotia Keltics. This program includes 15's teams at the following ages: U15, U16, U17, U18, U19, U20 and Senior; which compete at the Canadian Rugby Championship in championship and festival divisions. In 2009, Rugby Canada decided to disband the RCSL and replace it with a new U-20 league called the Rugby Canada National Junior Championship. The Keltics were chosen as one of the remaining RCSL clubs to enter the newly formed league.
