= Valley Royals Track & Field Club =

The Valley Royals Track & Field Club is an athletics club based out of Abbotsford, British Columbia. Their uniforms are royal blue, red, and white, and their head coach is Trevor Wight and club advisor is the legendary Gerry Swan. The club is based out of Jane & Gerry Swan Track at Rotary Stadium (so named in tribute to Coach Swan and his late wife), although they also have training groups in the Burnaby/Coquitlam area.

The Valley Royals are a member club of BC Athletics (British Columbia Athletics Association) and Athletics Canada.

== History ==
The Abbotsford Royals (as they were originally named) were founded in 1980 by a group of parents who were unhappy with the direction of the Abbotsford Track Club; within five years, the original track club merged with the Royals. Initially a junior development organization, the Royals blossomed under the leadership of three founding members: Paul Anderson (their first president), Gerry Swan (their first and only head coach), and his wife Jane.

Shortly after Jane Swan's death in 2004, the city of Abbotsford renamed Rotary Stadium as "Jane & Gerry Swan Track at Rotary Stadium", in recognition of their contributions to the sport of athletics and the Abbotsford community as a whole. The following year, Jane was posthumously inducted to the BC Sports Hall of Fame.

== Coaches ==
Current Valley Royals coaches:

- Trevor Wight - Head Coach (Power & Speed)
- Scott Svelander - Middle Distance Coach
- Brit Townsend - Middle Distance Coach (Burnaby/Coquitlam)
- Trevor Wight - Power/Speed Coach
- Tom Dickson - Power/Speed Coach (Burnaby)
- Debbie Foote - Throws Coach
- Makaila LaPointe - Pole Vault Coach
- Scott Svelander - Junior Development Coach
- Trevor Wight - Junior Development Coach

== Olympians ==
Over the years, the Valley Royals have recruited several international-calibre athletes, and developed many children into great athletes. The following are lists of former and current Valley Royals (with Olympic years and events) who have competed at Olympic Games, many during their time as Valley Royals.

Former Valley Royals:

- Jessica Smith - 2012 - 800m
- Michael Mason - 2008 - high jump
- Ruky Abdulai 2008 - long jump
- Stephanie McCann - 2004 - pole vault
- Royals & SFU coach Brit Townsend - 1984 - 1,500 m
- Royals coach Harold Willers - 1984 - hammer throw (did not compete due to injury)
- Leah Pells - 1992 - 3,000 m; 1996, 2000 - 1,500 m
- Lynn Williams - 1984 - 3,000 m; 1988 - 1,500 m
- Graeme Fell - 1988, 1992 - 3,000 m steeplechase
- Greg Duhaime - 1984 - 3,000 m steeplechase

== Other Noteworthy Athletes ==
Other athletes who have represented the Valley Royals on the international stage include:

- Sarah Howell
- Kevin Robinson
- Angela Froese
- Heather deGeest
- Courtney Inman
- Marty Cluff
- Cari Rampersad
- Jas Gill
- Wes Boudreau
- Matt Clifford
- Corrina Wolf
- Peter Cardle
- Natalie Jackson
- Meredith Macgregor
- Julia Howard
- Rebecca Johnstone
- Rowan Hamilton
- Vikramjit Singh Gondara

== Events ==
The Valley Royals have hosted many prestigious events at Jane & Gerry Swan Track at Rotary Stadium since it was completed in 1986, including:

- Pre Commonwealth Games Meet - 1994
- Western Canada Summer Games - 1995
- Harry Jerome International Track Classic - 1996
- Canadian Senior Championships - 1997
- NAIA National Championships - 1992, 1993, 2000, 2001
- BC Disability Games - 2002
- BC Summer Games - 2004
- BC Seniors Games - 2006
- Canadian 10,000 m Championships - 2006, 2007
- Canadian Junior Championships - 1997, 2007, 2008
- Abbotsford International Track Classic - every June since 2003 (as part of the PacifiCanada Series)
- Countless BC Championships (for the Junior Development, Juvenile/Youth, Junior, Senior, and Master age groups)
- BC Summer Games - 2016
