= Parfrey =

Parfrey is a surname. Notable people with the surname include:

- Adam Parfrey (1957–2018), American journalist, editor and publisher
- Kevin Parfrey, Canadian rugby player
- Patrick Parfrey (born 1950), Canadian physician
- Woodrow Parfrey (1922–1984), American film and television actor

== See also ==
- Parfrey's Glen, Wisconsin - United States' first natural area, managed by the Devil's Lake State Park
