= Leiblin Park, Nova Scotia =

Coordinates: 44°35′39.7″N 63°38′18.6″W

Leiblin Park, Nova Scotia is a residential neighbourhood in Halifax on the Mainland Halifax within the Halifax Regional Municipality, Nova Scotia.

== History ==
Leiblin Park was conceived by William J. Olie in the early 1950s. The land was an inheritance of his wife, Elizabeth (Pearl) Kidston. The subdivision takes its name from a farm owned by Henry Leiblin, in the area of what is now Elmdale Crescent.

The tract of land was about 3 km long, but narrow, bordered by the watershed of Long Lake (at the time the water supply of the city of Halifax) on its east side. Olie planned to create one long street, to be called Leiblin Drive, with crescents looping off it to the west. Each crescent would contain 16 single-family dwellings. The crescents are named in alphabetical order, with tree or plant names predominating.

The first crescent, Avon, was built in 1956, and the homes sold quickly, for around $8,000 each. The city of Halifax (at that time the peninsula) was overcrowded, and new housing was much in demand. The capital raised from Avon allowed Olie to leverage financing for the rest of the project, and construction re-commenced in 1958.

In the area of Devon and Elmdale Crescents the Drive ran into the flank of a large drumlin. The material excavated from the drumlin was used to fill the side of a peat bog to the southwest. Due to the bog, there is no "F" crescent. In the 1960s and 1970s there was a commercial building just past Elmsdale, with offices, two apartments, and a corner store, first operated by Elizabeth Olie. The building has since been demolished. The bog was gradually filled with construction and demolition waste in the 1970s and 1980s to create the Graves-Oakley Memorial Park.

Beyond the bog, four more crescents were built, plus Kenwood Avenue and Linden Lane. At this point the project was running up against the Old Sambro Road, as well as large granite outcroppings on Linden Lane. The plan was to continue the project across the Old Sambro Road, and the land was cleared of the larger trees, but in 1963 Olie Construction Ltd. was forced to declare bankruptcy.

Since that time, additional homes have been added to most of the crescents, and Nita Lane has been built near Linden Lane.
