= Fraser Valley Rugby Union =

Canadian rugby administrative organization

The Fraser Valley Rugby Union (FVRU) is the administrative body for rugby union in the Fraser Valley of British Columbia. The FVRU currently consists of 10 rugby clubs.

The Fraser Valley senior men's representative team was known as the Venom.

== List of Clubs in FVRU ==
- Abbotsford RFC
- Chilliwack Crusaders RFC
- Chuckanut Bay Geoducks RFC
- Kamloops Raiders RFC
- Kelowna Crows RFC
- Langley RFC
- Richmond RFC
- Ridge Meadows Bruins Rugby
- Surrey Beavers Athletic Association
- United Rugby Club

== See also ==
- Rugby Canada
  - Rugby Canada Super League
- British Columbia Rugby Union
