= New Brunswick Rugby Union =

The New Brunswick Rugby Union (NBRU) is the provincial administrative body for rugby union in New Brunswick, Canada and a Provincial Union of Rugby Canada.
