= Newfoundland and Labrador Rugby Union =

Sports administrative body in Canada

- Sport: Rugby union
- Founded: 1889; 137 years ago
- President: John Cowan
- Website: http://nlrugby.ca

The Newfoundland and Labrador Rugby Union is the provincial administrative body for rugby union in Newfoundland and Labrador, Canada and a Provincial Union of Rugby Canada.

== Current Teams ==
Baymen Rugby Club, Conception Bay South, Newfoundland and Labrador

Dogs Rugby Football Club, Mount Pearl, Newfoundland and Labrador

Swilers Rugby Football Club, St. John's, Newfoundland and Labrador

Vandals Rugby Football Club, St. John's, Newfoundland and Labrador
