= Rugby Manitoba =

- Sport: Rugby
- Jurisdiction: Manitoba
- Founded: 1879
- Headquarters: Winnipeg, MB
- Sponsor: Sport Canada, Sport Manitoba

Official website
- rugbymb.ca
- (Canada)
- (Manitoba)

Rugby Manitoba is the provincial administrative body for rugby union in Manitoba, Canada and a Provincial Union of Rugby Canada.
