= Brockton Oval =

Sports venue in Vancouver, British Columbia

- Interactive map of Brockton Oval

Ground information
- Location: Brockton Point, Stanley Park, Vancouver
- Country: Canada
- Coordinates: 49.29964°N 123.12446°W
- Establishment: 1889
- Capacity: 2,000 to 3,000
- Owner: Brockton Point Cricket Club
- Operator: Brockton Point Cricket Club
- Tenants: Evergreens RFC Vancouver Cricket Club

Team information
Brockton Point Cricket Club	(1891 -)
Evergreens Rugby Football Club	(1972 -)
- As of August 8, 2014; Source: Brockton Oval

Brockton Oval is a playing area near the Brockton Point located on the north side of Coal Harbour in Stanley Park, Vancouver, British Columbia, Canada. The ground was established 1891 with 10 sport's groups joining together. In 1927, cricket and rugby fields were carved out.

Brockton Oval has been visited by cricket players such as Donald Bradman, Fred Trueman and Geoffrey Boycott. Around 2,000 to 3,000 people arrived to see the match at the ground when Australians and MCC sides visited the ground.

The Oval is the home of Brockton Point Cricket Club which was one of the 7 founding member clubs of the British Columbia Mainland Cricket League in 1914. Vancouver Cricket Club began their journey on this ground in 1889.

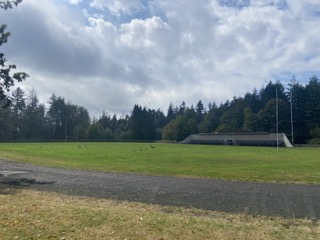
Brockton Oval

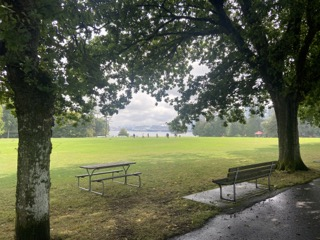
View from Brockton Oval

== History ==
Before 1865, the point was utilised as a graveyard for early settlers who came to Vancouver. That year, Edward Stamp—a British businessman in the timber industry—cleared away part of the site in order to build a sawmill. However, he was forced to abandon his plans after realising the strong currents from the harbour impeded the construction of log booms. He ended up moving the mill to Gastown, becoming Hastings Mill.

The land cleared by Stamp was converted into sports fields by 1891. One of these, Brockton Oval, became a key amateur sports venue and was mostly used for cricket. Donald Bradman and Fred Trueman both played at the Oval, and after Bradman's visit in 1932, he called the venue the most beautiful cricket ground in the world. Geoffrey Boycott also played at the grounds in September 1964 and echoed Bradman's sentiments and praise of the Oval.

Most recently the ground hosted two matches in July 2012 when MCC visited Canada. They played against British Columbia Mainland League and British Columbia Cricket Association President's XI in Cliff Cox's Memorial Game.
