= Saskatchewan Rugby Union =

SaskRugby
- Sport: Rugby
- Jurisdiction: Saskatchewan
- Founded: 1971
- Location: Regina, Saskatchewan
- President: Jason Brandt

The Saskatchewan Rugby Union or SaskRugby is the provincial administrative body for rugby in Saskatchewan, Canada. It encompasses the North Saskatchewan (NSRU) and Regina (RRU) sub-unions, as well as several clubs and youth programs.

== History ==
The first governing body was formed in 1890 for the purposes of organizing a tour to Winnipeg, Manitoba, preceding the formation of the province on Saskatchewan.

After rugby in the province experienced a resurgence in the 1960's, having declined due to the rise of football, the current body was formed in 1971.

== Board of Directors ==
| Position | Name |
|---|---|
| President | Jason Brandt |
| Vice President | Alyx Paulson |
| Treasurer | Nathan Thomson |
| Director | Chris Scramstad |
| Director | Jason Ross |
| Director | Christie Westbrook |
| Director | Carli Patenaude |
| NSRU President | Justin McGhee |
| RRU President | Maggie Tatarinoff |

== Past Presidents ==
- 1971-73 - Peter Ventre
- 1974-78 - Dr. Brian Fern
- 1979 - Gordon Westley
- 1980 - Dean Faris
- 1981-87 - Peter Ventre
- 1988 - Dr. Brian Fern
- 1989-95 - Leo Lane
- 1996-98 - Kevin Peacock
- 1999-2002 - Leo Lane
- 2003-06 - Michael Nolin
- 2007 - Clint Gifford
- 2008-10 - Arnold Maier
- 2010-12 - David Kot
- 2014-2021 - Damon Leonard
- 2021-26 - Joel Briere

== Clubs ==
- Campion Grads
- Gophers
- Krems
- Moose Jaw
- Prince Albert Whiskey Jacks
- Regina Condors
- Regina Highlanders
- Regina Rage
- Regina Ravens
- Regina Rogues
- Saskatoon Badgers
- Saskatoon Kirin
- Saskatoon Wild Oats
- University of Saskatchewan

=== Invitational team ===
- Canadian Howlers (initially founded as Dog River Howlers before opening up to players from across Canada)

=== Youth ===
- Lashburn Lucky
- Lloydminster
- MacDowell Rugby Academy
- Meadow Lake She Devils
- Regina Minor Rugby
- Saskatoon Minor Rugby

== Representative teams ==
After the Rugby Canada Super League (RCSL) was discontinued in 2009, there hasn't been a regular senior men's representative team. The province's RCSL team, Saskatchewan Prairie Fire, played in all editions of the competition, winning in 2007.
