= Vancouver Rugby Union =

- Abbreviation: VRFU
- Legal status: Association
- Headquarters: Vancouver, British Columbia
- Region served: British Columbia, Canada
- President: Peter Muirhead
- Main organ: Executive Committee
- Website: http://www.vancouverrugbyunion.ca

The Vancouver Rugby Union (VRU) is the administrative body for rugby union in Vancouver, British Columbia, Canada. The VRU currently consists of 11 local rugby clubs and Seattle.

== Members ==
Team	Ground	City/Area	Founded	BC Champions
Burnaby Lake	Burnaby Lake Sports Complex	Burnaby	1994	0
Capilano	Klahanie Park	North Shore	1969	9
Castaway Wanderers	Windsor Park	Oak Bay	1906	6
James Bay	MacDonald Park	Victoria	1886	24
Meraloma Rugby	Connaught Park	Vancouver	1923	13
UBC Thunderbirds	Wolfson Field	Vancouver	1906	4
Ravens	Jericho Park	Vancouver	1974	6
Rowers	Brockton Oval	Vancouver	1908	3
UVIC Vikes	Wallace Field	University of Victoria	1963	3
