= Vancouver Wave =

Canadian rugby union team

(Canada) Vancouver Wave
- Full name: Vancouver Wave Rugby Football Club
- Union: Rugby Canada; Vancouver Rugby Union; British Columbia Rugby Union
- Nickname: The Wave
- Founded: Vancouver Rugby Union - Undetermined (Over 100 Years)
- Location: Vancouver, British Columbia
- Ground: Brockton Oval at Stanley Park (Capacity: 5,000)
- Coach: Christiaan Esterhuizen (2021-Present)
- League(s): RCSL (1998-2008); RCNJC (2009-present); Coastal Cup (2021)

Official website
- www.vancouverrugbyunion.ca

The Vancouver Wave are a Canadian rugby union team based in Vancouver, British Columbia. The team plays in the Rugby Canada National Junior Championship and draws most of its players from the Vancouver Rugby Union and the British Columbia Rugby Union, one of fourteen Rugby Unions that have rep teams in the RCSL.

The Wave play their "home" games at the Brockton Oval at Stanley Park in Vancouver.

The team played under the name BC Wave for the 2006 and 2007 RCSL seasons, but later switched back to using Vancouver Wave.

On August 1, 2009, the team won their first national championship. When they defeated the Toronto Rebellion 41–21.

On November 13, 2021, the Wave became the first Coastal Cup champions.

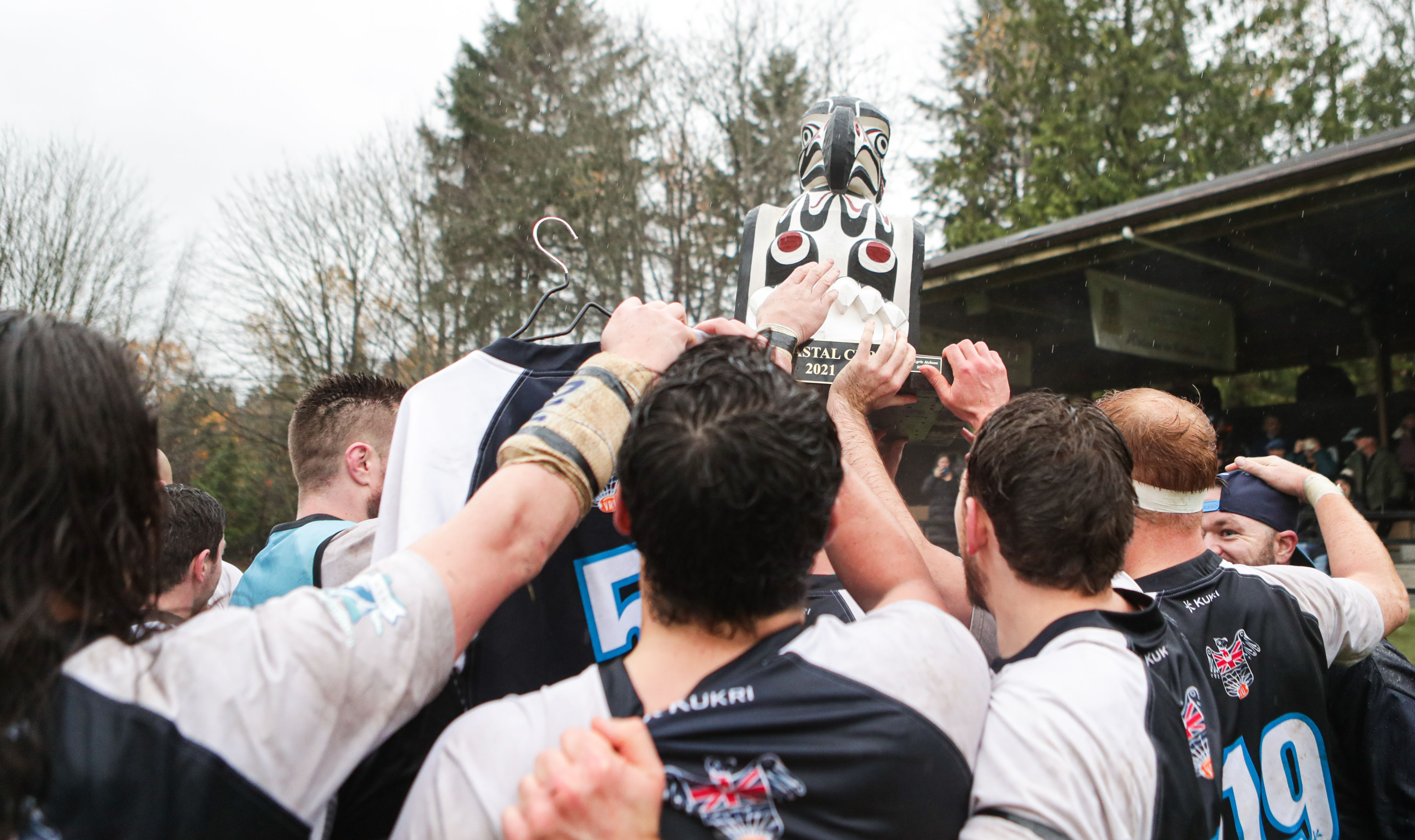
Vancouver Wave win the 2021 Coastal Cup

== History ==
In 1998, Rugby Canada and the provincial unions agreed to form the Rugby Canada Super League. Fourteen unions and sub-unions were invited to compete in the new semi-professional league.

In 2009, Rugby Canada decided to disband the RCSL and replace it with a new U-20 league called the Rugby Canada National Junior Championship. The Wave was chosen as one of the remaining RCSL clubs to enter the newly formed league.

In 2021, forming to represent the Vancouver Rugby Union but without players playing representing UBC Men's Rugby and Van East Rugby, who were from the Burnaby Lake Rugby Club, the Vancouver Wave won the Inaugural Coastal Cup. The team went undefeated, winning six matches and losing none, defeating the Pacific Pride (rugby union) in the final match to seal the Grand Slam.

== Management and coaches ==
| Position | Name | Nationality |
|---|---|---|
| Team Manager | Paddy Watson | Canada/Ireland |
| Head coach | Christiaan Esterhuizen | South Africa |
| Defence Coach | Aaron Takel | Wales |
| Attack Coach | John Ball | England |
| Forwards Coach | Guido Suez | Argentina |
| Strength & Conditioning | Mike Hall | Canada |
| Medical Director | Ashley MacInnes | Canada |

== Coastal Cup 2021 Squad ==
Vancouver Wave Coastal Cup squad
| Props: (Canada) Ryan Chapman; (Canada) Neil Courtney (c); (Canada) Vasilis Miroslaw; (Canada) Mark Paddock; (Canada) Jake Schwartz; (Canada) Pat Zuk; Hookers: (England) Pete Ingoldsby; (Argentina) Matias Suez; Locks: (Canada) Liam Doll; (Canada) Dave Matthews; (Ireland) Brian Moylett | Back row: (Scotland) Giles Calder; (Canada) Alex Carmel; (New Zealand) Jalan Farris; (Ireland) Darragh Foley; (Canada) Jake Ikeda; (Canada) Wes Lee; Scrum-halves: (Canada) Jack Scher; (South Africa) Thomas Viljoen; Fly-halves: (Canada) Adam McQueen; (Philippines) Robbie Jones | Centres: (Australia) Colby Mason; (New Zealand) Isaac Winter; Wings: (New Zealand) Jesse Hocking; (Canada) Sean Ferguson; (Canada) Johnny Franklin; (New Zealand) Phil Lelievre; (South Africa) Josh Powdrell; Fullbacks: (Australia) Mike Moloney; (Canada) David Thompson |
(c) denotes the team captain

== Season-by-season records ==
Season records
| Season | W | L | T | Finish | Playoff results |
|---|---|---|---|---|---|
Vancouver Wave
| 1998 | 3 | 3 | 0 | 6th West Division | -- |
| 1999 | 4 | 2 | 0 | 3rd West Division | -- |
| 2002 | 3 | 2 | 0 | 3rd West Division | -- |
| 2003 | 3 | 3 | 0 | 4th West Division | -- |
| 2004 | 4 | 2 | 0 | 2nd West Division | -- |
| 2005 | 2 | 4 | 0 | 5th West Division | -- |
BC Wave
| 2006 | 1 | 3 | 0 | 4th West Division | -- |
| 2007 | 0 | 4 | 0 | 5th West Division | -- |
Vancouver Wave
| 2008 | 1 | 3 | 0 | 5th West Division | -- |
| 2009 | 3 | 0 | 1 | 1st Pacific Division | Won West Final (Mavericks); Won Championship Final (Rebellion) |
| Totals | 24 | 26 | 1 | (regular season, 1998–2009) | |
| Totals | 2 | 0 | 0 | (playoffs, 1998–2009) | |

=== 2021 Standings ===
2021 Coastal Cup Champions

Coastal Cup Standings
| Pos | Team | P | W | D | L | PF | PA | PD | BP | Pts |
|---|---|---|---|---|---|---|---|---|---|---|
| 1 | Vancouver Wave | 6 | 6 | 0 | 0 | 194 | 110 | +88 | 3 | 27 |
| 2 | Pacific Pride | 6 | 4 | 1 | 1 | 188 | 113 | +75 | 4 | 22 |
| 3 | University of British Columbia | 6 | 4 | 1 | 1 | 154 | 91 | +63 | 4 | 22 |
| 4 | Van East | 6 | 3 | 0 | 3 | 134 | 125 | +9 | 2 | 16 |
| 5 | Crimson Tide | 6 | 2 | 0 | 4 | 116 | 156 | -40 | 1 | 10 |
| 6 | University of Victoria | 6 | 1 | 0 | 5 | 133 | 168 | -35 | 1 | 8 |
| 7 | Trinity Western University | 6 | 0 | 0 | 6 | 77 | 235 | -26 | 0 | 0 |
