= Manitoba Buffalo =

(Canada) Manitoba Buffalo
- Full name: Manitoba Buffalo Rugby Football Club
- Union: Rugby Canada; Manitoba Rugby Union
- Nickname: Buffalo
- Founded: 1998
- Location: Winnipeg, Manitoba
- Ground: Maple Grove Rugby Park
Team kit

The Manitoba Buffalo was a Canadian Rugby union team based in Winnipeg, Manitoba. The team played in the Rugby Canada Super League from 1998 to 2005, and drew most of its players from the Manitoba Rugby Union, one of fourteen Rugby Unions that have rep teams in the RCSL.

The Buffalo played their "home" games at Maple Grove Rugby Park in Winnipeg.

== History ==
In 1998, Rugby Canada and the provincial unions agreed to form the Rugby Canada Super League. Fourteen unions and sub-unions were invited to compete in the new semi-professional league.
