= Quebec Caribou =

- Full name: Quebec Caribou Rugby Football Club
- Unions: Rugby Canada; Fédération de Rugby du Québec
- Location: Montreal, Quebec
- Ground: Loyola Field
- League: Rugby Canada Super League

Official website
- www.rugbyquebec.qc.ca

The Quebec Caribou was a rugby union club based in Montreal, Quebec, Canada. Drawing players from rugby clubs throughout Quebec, the Caribou competed against other provincial teams in the eastern division of the Rugby Canada Super League (RCSL).
