= Ottawa Harlequins =

- Full name: Ottawa Harlequins Rugby Football Club
- Unions: Rugby Canada; Eastern Ontario Rugby Union
- Location: Ottawa, Ontario
- Ground: Twin Elm Rugby Park
- League: Rugby Canada Super League
Team kit	2nd kit

Official website
- eorurugby.com/harlequins/

The Ottawa Harlequins were a Canadian rugby union team based in eastern Ontario. The team played in the Rugby Canada Super League (RCSL) and drew most of its players from the Eastern Ontario Rugby Union, one of fourteen Rugby Unions that have rep teams in the RCSL.

They played their home games at Twin Elm Rugby Park in South Nepean, Ottawa.

The Ottawa Harlequins and the Toronto Renegades entered the Eastern Division of the Rugby Canada Super League (RCSL) at the beginning of the 1999 season, joining the New Brunswick Black Spruce, Montreal Menace, Nova Scotia Keiths and the Newfoundland Rock.
