= Rugby Canada Super League =

Canadian rugby union competition

- Sport: Rugby union
- Founded: 1998
- First season: 1998
- Folded: 2009
- No. of teams: 11
- Country: Canada
- Last champion: Newfoundland Rock (3rd title)
- Most titles: Vancouver Island Crimson Tide (4 titles)

The Rugby Canada Super League (RCSL or Super League) was a national, semi-professional rugby union competition in Canada. The league represented the second level of domestic rugby union in Canada, and the highest level wholly indigenous to Canada. In terms of seniority it rested immediately beneath the IRB sponsored North America 4, a former US/Canadian cross-border competition in which two Canadian teams (Canada East and Canada West) took part. Most players took part in RCSL ("Super League") on an amateur basis.

In early 2009, after 11 seasons of play, Rugby Canada decided to disband the RCSL in the wake of the establishment of the Americas Rugby Championship, the successor to the North America 4. The RCSL was replaced by the Canadian Rugby Championship and the Rugby Canada National Junior Championship, which absorbed the majority of the RCSL teams.

== Overview ==
The competition was established in 1998 and had been played on an annual basis. It is considered to be Canada's premier wholly domestic rugby competition. Players on Canada's senior men's team were often chosen from Super League clubs.

The Super League drew its teams from provincial unions. Larger unions (BC, Alberta, and Ontario) had more than one representative team; those teams were drawn largely from provincial sub-unions. For example, the Calgary Rugby Union and Edmonton Rugby Union are sub-unions of the larger Alberta Rugby Union and had both been given representation in the Super League.

Teams were divided into Eastern and Western Divisions and played each of the other teams in their division once. The top team in each division played each other for the national championship.

The league rarely had identical membership from season to season, with teams who have membership occasionally electing not to play due to financial, logistical or level-of-play concerns. For 2006 season, the Fraser Valley Rugby Union of B.C. ("The Venom") and the Manitoba Rugby Union ("The Buffalo") elected not to participate, which created an unbalanced situation where the Western Division had five teams (therefore only four games in their season), while the Eastern Division had seven (six games).

== Teams ==
=== Western Conference ===
Team	City / area	Seasons
Calgary Mavericks	Calgary, Alberta	1998–2008
Edmonton Gold	Edmonton, Alberta	1998–2008
Fraser Valley Venom	Fraser Valley, British Columbia	1998–2004
Manitoba Buffalo	Winnipeg, Manitoba	1998–2001, 2003–2005
Saskatchewan Prairie Fire	Regina, Saskatchewan	1998–2008
Vancouver Island Crimson Tide	Victoria, British Columbia	1998–2008
Vancouver Island Raiders	Vancouver Island	2005
Vancouver Wave	Vancouver, British Columbia	1998–1999, 2002–2008

=== Eastern Conference ===
Team	City / area	Seasons
New Brunswick Black Spruce	Fredericton, New Brunswick	1998–2008
Newfoundland Rock	St. John's, Newfoundland	1998–2008
Niagara Thunder	Burlington, Ontario	2004–2008
Nova Scotia Keltics	Halifax, Nova Scotia	1998–2008
Ottawa Harlequins	Ottawa, Ontario	1999–2000, 2002–2008
Quebec Caribou	Montreal, Quebec	1998–2000, 2002, 2004–2008
Toronto Xtreme	Toronto, Ontario	1999–2007

== Champions ==
Year	Champion	Score	Runner-up
1998	Vancouver Island Crimson Tide	—	Nova Scotia Keiths
1999	Vancouver Island Crimson Tide (2)	23–11	Toronto Renegades
2000	Fraser Valley Venom	15–9	Nova Scotia Keltics
2001	Fraser Valley Venom (2)	20–14	Toronto Renegades
2002	Vancouver Island Crimson Tide (3)	6–3	Newfoundland Rock
2003	Calgary Mavericks	40–24	Toronto Xtreme
2004	Vancouver Island Crimson Tide (4)	14–8	Newfoundland Rock
2005	Newfoundland Rock	26–13	Saskatchewan Prairie Fire
2006	Newfoundland Rock (2)	28–14	Saskatchewan Prairie Fire
2007	Saskatchewan Prairie Fire	28–12	Niagara Thunder
2008	Newfoundland Rock (3)	30–6	Calgary Mavericks

== See also ==
- Canada national rugby union team
- Rugby union in Canada
- Canadian Rugby Championship
