= Fraser Valley Venom =

Canadian rugby union club, bassd in Fraser Valley, BC

(Canada) Fraser Valley Venom
- Full name: Fraser Valley Venom Rugby Football Club
- Union: Rugby Canada; Fraser Valley Rugby Union
- Nickname(s): Venom, Valley Venom
- Founded: 1972
- Location: Fraser Valley, British Columbia
- Ground: Rotary Stadium (Capacity: 4,000)
- Chairman: Jim Ryan
1st kit	2nd kit

Official website
- fvru.com

The Fraser Valley Venom are a Canadian rugby union team based in the Fraser Valley, British Columbia. The team plays in the Rugby Canada National Junior Championship and draws most of its players from the Fraser Valley Rugby Union, one of 13 Rugby Unions that have representative teams in the RCNJC. The Venom previously played in the Rugby Canada Super League until the national governing body, Rugby Canada, decided to disband the league after the 2008 season in favour of the Americas Rugby Championship. Rugby Canada established the RCNJC as a new under-20 national competition, with virtually all the RCSL unions choosing to field teams in that league.

The Venom play their "home" games at Rotary Stadium in Abbotsford.

The Venom won the 2000 RCSL championship defeating the Nova Scotia Keltics (15-9) and the 2001 Championship defeating the Toronto Renegades (20-14).

== History ==
In 1998, Rugby Canada and the provincial unions agreed to form the Rugby Canada Super League. Fourteen unions and sub-unions were invited to compete in the new semi-professional league.
