= Saskatchewan Prairie Fire =

(Canada) Prairie Fire
- Full name: Prairie Fire Rugby Football Club
- Union: Rugby Canada; Saskatchewan Rugby Union
- Nickname: Prairie Fire
- Founded: 1998
- Location: Regina, Saskatchewan
- Ground: Regina Rugby Park (Capacity: 3,000)
- Chairman: Tim Young
- Coach: Caine Elisara
- League(s): RCSL (1998-2008); RCNJC (2009-2010)
1st kit	2nd kit

Official website
- prairiefiresask.com

The Saskatchewan Prairie Fire was a Canadian rugby union team based in Regina, Saskatchewan. The team played in the Rugby Canada Super League and the Rugby Canada National Junior Championship, which followed once the former was disbanded. The Fire drew most of their players from the Saskatchewan Rugby Union, one of fourteen Rugby Unions that had representative teams in the RCSL.

The Prairie Fire played their home games at Regina Rugby Park in Regina.

The Prairie Fire were Western Champions for the 2005 and 2006 seasons, but both times came up short in the Super League Final versus the Newfoundland Rock, once in Regina and once in St. John's, Newfoundland, at Swilers Rugby Park. They won the MacTier Cup at Regina Rugby Park in 2007 defeating the Niagara Thunder, 28–12.

These were three of five times that a team outside of British Columbia has been the Western Champion of the RCSL; the other two times were by the Calgary Mavericks in 2003 and 2008.

== History ==
In 1998, Rugby Canada and the provincial unions agreed to form the Rugby Canada Super League. Fourteen unions and sub-unions were invited to compete in the new semi-professional league. The league is deemed semi-professional because some of the smaller clubs are paying foreign players to play for their side. However, the vast majority of the domestic players actually pay to play for their team. The Prairie Fire is by far the most liberal user of foreign professional players.

In 2009, Rugby Canada decided to disband the RCSL and replace it with a new U-20 league called the Rugby Canada National Junior Championship. The Prairie Fire were chosen as one of the remaining RCSL clubs to enter the newly formed league.
