= Edmonton Gold =

Canadian rugby union club based in Edmonton, Alberta

(Canada) Edmonton Gold
- Full name: Edmonton Gold Rugby Football Club
- Union: Rugby Canada; Edmonton Rugby Union
- Nickname: Gold
- Founded: 1998; 28 years ago
- Location: Edmonton, Alberta
- Ground: Ellerslie Rugby Park (Capacity: n/a)
- Chairman: Jo Reinbold
- Coach: Mike Dowell
Team kit

Official website
- edmontonrugby.com

The Edmonton Gold were a Canadian rugby union team based in Edmonton, Alberta. The team played in the Rugby Canada Super League and drew most of its players from the Edmonton Rugby Union, one of fourteen Rugby Unions that have rep teams in the RCSL.

The Gold played their home games at Ellerslie Rugby Park in Edmonton.

== History ==
In 1998, Rugby Canada and the provincial unions agreed to form the Rugby Canada Super League. Fourteen unions and sub-unions were invited to compete in the new semi-professional league.
