= Toronto Xtreme =

Canadian rugby union club, based in Markham, Ontario

(Canada) Toronto Xtreme
- Full name: Toronto Xtreme Rugby Football Club
- Union: Rugby Canada; Toronto Rugby Union
- Nickname(s): Renegades (1999–2002); Xtreme (2003–2007)
- Founded: 1999
- Location: Markham, Ontario
- Ground: Fletcher's Fields (Capacity: 3,000)
- League: Rugby Canada Super League
Team kit

Official website
- torontoxtreme.com

The Toronto Xtreme (formerly Toronto Renegades) were a Canadian rugby union team based in Markham, Ontario. The team played in the Rugby Canada Super League and drew most of its players from the Toronto Rugby Union.

Founded in 1999 as the Toronto Renegades, the team was Eastern Champions in 1999, 2001, and 2003. The Xtreme did not participate in the 2008 season which was the final year of RCSL.

== Season-by-season records ==
Season records
Season	W	L	T	Finish	Playoff results
Toronto Renegades
1999	4	0	1	1st East Division	Lost Finals (Vancouver Island Crimson Tide)
2000	4	1	0	2nd East Division	—
2001	4	0	0	1st East Division	Lost Finals (Fraser Valley Venom)
2002	5	1	0	2nd East Division	—
Toronto Xtreme
2003	4	0	0	1st East Division	Lost Finals (Calgary Mavericks)
2004	5	1	0	2nd East Division	–
2005	3	2	1	3rd East Division	—
2006	2	4	0	5th East Division	—
2007	3	3	0	4th East Division	—
Totals	34	12	2	(regular season, 1999–2007)	
Totals	0	3	0	(playoffs, 1999–2007)	

== Toronto Rebellion ==
In 2009, Rugby Canada disbanded the RCSL and started a new league called Rugby Canada National Junior Championship. The Toronto Rugby Union fielded a team known as the Toronto Rebellion during the 2009 RCNJC season.
