= Vancouver Island Crimson Tide =

Crimson Tide
- Full name: Vancouver Island Crimson Tide
- Union: Rugby Canada; British Columbia Rugby Union
- Coach: (Canada) Nanyak Dala
- League: Coastal Cup

The Vancouver Island Crimson Tide are a Canadian rugby union team based in Victoria, British Columbia. The team plays in the Coastal Cup.

The Tide play their home games at the Windsor Park in Victoria.

The team hold the record for winning the most MacTier Cups.

== History ==
In 1998, Rugby Canada and the provincial unions agreed to form the Rugby Canada Super League. Fourteen unions and sub-unions were invited to compete in the new semi-professional league.

In 2009, Rugby Canada decided to disband the RCSL after 11 seasons of Super League play in Canada. The RCSL was replaced by the Rugby Canada National Junior Championship. The league contains many of the junior RCSL clubs.

== Season-by-season records ==
Season records
Season	W	L	T	Finish	Playoff results
1998	5	0	1	1st West Division	Won MacTier Cup (Halifax Keiths)
1999	6	0	0	1st West Division	Won MacTier Cup (Toronto Renegades)
2000	3	2	0	3rd West Division	--
2001	4	1	0	2nd West Division	--
2002	4	1	0	1st West Division	Won MacTier Cup (Newfoundland Rock)
2003	4	2	0	2nd West Division	--
2004	6	0	0	1st West Division	Won MacTier Cup (Newfoundland Rock)
2005	5	1	0	2nd West Division	--
2006	1	3	0	5th West Division	--
2007	1	3	0	4th West Division	--
2008	1	3	0	4th West Division	--
Totals	40	16	1	(regular season, 1998–2008)	
Totals	4	0	0	(playoffs, 1998–2008)	

== Personnel ==
=== Current squad ===
The 2021 Crimson Tide squad for the 2021 Coastal Cup.

Backs
Player	Position
Owen Brombal	Scrum-half
Crosby Stewart	Scrum-half
Rylen Waugh	Scrum-half
Gradyn Bowd (c)	Fly-half
George Barton	Centre
Tom Burton	Centre
Clayton Meeres	Centre
Mike Nieuwenhuysen	Centre
Tyler Hume	Centre
Shane Dagg	Wing
Henry Do	Wing
Isaac Gonevou	Wing
Kainoa Lloyd	Wing
Mostyn Findlay	Full-back
Jordan Tait	Full-back

Forwards
Player	Position
Antonio Corbin	Hooker
Jake Slobodian	Hooker
Makz Foot	Lock
Andrew MacPherson	Prop
Bryce McKinnon	Prop
Jake Sponarski	Prop
Kyle Steeves	Prop
Mike Finnemore	Lock
Nathan Groenewold	Lock
Aiden McCleary	Lock
Conor Turner	Lock
Tyler Hume	Back row
Alex Jordan	Back row
Peter Masimo	Back row
Zephyr Melnyck	Back row
Ollie Nott	Back row
Matt Weir	Back row

=== Coaching staff ===
- Head Coach: Nanyak Dala
- Assistant Coach: Sean White

== See also ==
- Coastal Cup
