= Rugby Canada =

National governing body for rugby union in Canada

- Sport: Rugby union
- Founded: 1974; 52 years ago
- World Rugby affiliation: 1987
- RAN affiliation: 2001
- Chairman: Kathleen McGinn
- Men's coach: Steve Meehan
- Women's coach: Kévin Rouet
- Website: www.rugbycanada.ca

Rugby Canada is the national governing body for the sport of rugby union in Canada. Rugby Canada was incorporated in 1974, and stems from the Canadian Rugby Football Union, a body established in 1884 that now governs amateur Canadian football as Football Canada; and the now-defunct Rugby Union of Canada, established in 1929. Rugby Canada administers the Canada national rugby union team and sanctions the Rugby Canada National Junior Championship, a national competition for under-20 men's teams. It previously sanctioned the Super League as the premier level of men's competition in the country, but scrapped that league after the Americas Rugby Championship was created in 2009 as a two-stage competition in which the first involved only Canadian teams.

== History ==
=== Canadian Rugby Football Union ===
The Canadian Rugby Football Union was established in 1884 with the specific purpose of organizing play-off games between various union champions. Representatives from the Montreal Football club (now known as the Westmount Rugby Club), the Toronto Rugby Football Club and the Hamilton Rugby Football Club, had meetings in Toronto and Montreal. The union continued to use the English rugby rules, and at the end of the season the winning club of the Quebec Championship played the Ontario Champion for the Club Championship of the Dominion.

Former logo, used until 2018

This organization (also known as the Canadian Rugby Union) was the forerunner of the Canadian Football League, as rugby football in Canada evolved into Canadian football with rugby union being known as English rugby. To make matters more confusing the word rugby continued to be applied to Canadian football. It was not until 1967 that the original CRU finally cleared up this confusion by renaming itself the Canadian Amateur Football Association; it adopted its current name of Football Canada in 1986.

=== Rugby Union of Canada ===
The Rugby Union of Canada, re-formed in 1965 and incorporated in 1974, is affiliated to World Rugby. It has competed in nine out of ten Rugby World Cups (the first in 1987 in Australia and New Zealand) and in the World Rugby Sevens Series.

In 2026, Rugby Canada stated it was focused on "building a sustainable future for rugby at all levels" and investing in athletes and the communities that support the sport.

== Teams ==
National teams

- Canada national rugby union team
- Canada women's national rugby union team

National 7s teams

- Canada national rugby sevens team
- Canada women's national rugby union team (sevens)

== Provincial Rugby Unions in Canada ==
- British Columbia Rugby Union
  - Fraser Valley Rugby Union
  - Vancouver Rugby Union
- New Brunswick Rugby Union
- Newfoundland Rugby Union
- Ontario Rugby Union
- PEI Rugby Union
- Rugby Alberta
- Rugby Manitoba
- Rugby Nova Scotia
- Rugby Quebec
- Saskatchewan Rugby Union

== IGR Rugby Teams in Canada ==
Canada has four Rugby Teams that are also part of International Gay Rugby; Montreal Armada, Toronto Muddy York, Ottawa Wolves, and the Vancouver Rogues. In 2022 the international Bingham Cup was held in Ottawa, Ontario.

== See also ==
- Rugby union in Canada
