= New Brunswick Timber =

(Canada) Black Spruce Rugby
- Full name: Black Spruce Rugby
- Union: Rugby Canada; New Brunswick Rugby Union
- Nickname: Spruce
- Founded: 1998
- Location: Fredericton, New Brunswick
- Ground: Loyalists RFC
- Coach: Malcolm MacAfee/Keith McAlpine
Team kit

Official website
- blackspruce.ca

Black Spruce Rugby are a Canadian rugby union team based in Fredericton, New Brunswick. The team plays in the Rugby Canada Super League and draws most of its players from the New Brunswick Rugby Union.

The Spruce play their home games at Loyalists RFC in Fredericton.

== History ==
In 1998, Rugby Canada and the provincial unions agreed to form the Rugby Canada Super League. Fourteen unions and sub-unions were invited to compete in the new semi-professional league. 9 teams played in the inaugural RCSL season - Black Spruce Rugby was one of the 9 original teams others were The Rock, NS Keiths, Montreal Olympics, Manitoba Buffalo, The Prairie Fire, Calgary Maverics, Edmonton Gold and the Crimson Tide.
