= Calgary Mavericks =

Canadian rugby union team, based in Calgary

(Canada) Calgary Mavericks
- Full name: Calgary Mavericks Rugby Football Club
- Union: Rugby Canada; Calgary Rugby Union
- Nickname: The Mavericks
- Founded: 1960; 66 years ago
- Location: Calgary, Alberta
- Ground: Calgary Rugby Park (Capacity: 7,500)
- Chairman: Vince Fowler
- Coach: Peter Koen
- League(s): RCSL (1998-2008); RCNJC (2009-present)
1st kit	2nd kit

Official website
- calgarymavericksrugby.com

The Calgary Mavericks are a Canadian rugby union team based in Calgary, Alberta. The team plays in the Rugby Canada National Junior Championship and draws most of its players from the Calgary Rugby Union, one of fourteen Rugby Unions that have rep teams in the RCSL.

The Mavericks play their "home" games at Calgary Rugby Park in Calgary.

During the sixth season of the Super League the Mavericks became the first team outside of B.C. to win the league Championship defeating the Toronto Xtreme (40-24).

== History ==
In 1998, Rugby Canada and the provincial unions agreed to form the Rugby Canada Super League. Fourteen unions and sub-unions were invited to compete in the new semi-professional league.

In 2009, Rugby Canada decided to disband the RCSL and replace it with a new U-20 league called the Rugby Canada National Junior Championship. The Mavericks were chosen as one of the remaining RCSL clubs to enter the newly formed league.

== Season-by-season records ==
Season records
Season	W	L	T	Finish	Playoff results
1998	3	3	0	3rd West Division	--
1999	2	4	0	5th West Division	--
2000	2	3	0	4th West Division	--
2001	0	5	0	6th West Division	--
2002	3	2	0	4th West Division	--
2003	5	1	0	1st West Division	Won MacTier Cup (Toronto Xtreme)
2004	4	2	0	3rd West Division	--
2005	3	3	0	4th West Division	--
2006	2	2	0	3rd West Division	--
2007	2	2	0	3rd West Division	--
2008	4	0	0	1st West Division	Lost MacTier Cup (Newfoundland Rock)
Totals	30	27	0	(regular season, 1998–2008)	
Totals	1	1	0	(playoffs, 1998–2008)	
