= Nova Scotia Keltics =

Canadian rugby union club, based in Halifax, Nova Scotia

(Canada) Nova Scotia Keltics
- Full name: Nova Scotia Keltics Rugby Football Club
- Union: Nova Scotia Rugby Union
- Founded: 1998; 28 years ago
- Location: Halifax, Nova Scotia
1st kit	2nd kit

Official website
- rugbyns.ns.ca

The Nova Scotia Keltics were a rugby team in Halifax, Nova Scotia that competed in the Rugby Canada Super League. They played their home games alternatively at the Wanderers Grounds and Graves-Oakley Memorial Park.

== History ==
The club was one of the founding members of the Rugby Canada Super League in 1998. The Keltics played in the MacTier Cup final in 1998 (as the Nova Scotia Keiths) and in 2000, losing on both occasions.

Defence Minister Peter MacKay made his return at inside centre for the Keltics on May 19, 2008 in a 49–5 away loss to the Niagara Thunder.

In 2009, Rugby Canada decided to disband the RCSL and replace it with a new U-20 league called the Rugby Canada National Junior Championship. The Keltics were chosen as one of the remaining RCSL clubs to enter the newly formed league.

== See also ==
- Sports teams in the Halifax Regional Municipality
