= Newfoundland Rock =

(Canada) Newfoundland Rock
- Full name: Newfoundland Rock Rugby Football Club
- Union: Rugby Canada; Newfoundland Rugby Union
- Nickname: The Rock
- Founded: 1984
- Location: St. John's, Newfoundland & Labrador
- Ground: Swilers Rugby Park (Capacity: 6,500)
- Chairman: (Canada) / (Republic of Ireland) Noel Browne
- Coach: (Canada) / (Republic of Ireland) Patrick Parfrey
- League(s): RCSL (1998-2008); RCNJC (2009-present)
1st kit	2nd kit

Official website
- rockrugby.ca

The Newfoundland Rock are a Canadian rugby union team based in St. John's, Newfoundland and Labrador. The team plays in the Rugby Canada National Junior Championship (RCNJC) and draws most of its players from the Newfoundland Rugby Union, one of fourteen Rugby Unions that have representative teams in the RCNJC.

The organization was originally a competitor at the senior men's level. However, with a 2009 restructuring of Canada's rugby competitions, their place has been taken by a successor organization, the Atlantic Rock, a regional team in the Americas Rugby Championship.

The Rock play their home games at Swilers Rugby Park in St. John's.

== History ==
In 1998, Rugby Canada and the provincial unions agreed to form the Rugby Canada Super League (RCSL). Fourteen unions and sub-unions were invited to compete in the new semi-professional league.

The Rock were significantly successful in the RCSL, winning the Eastern Division to advance to the National Final match five of the league's eleven seasons.

During the eighth season of the Super League (2005), the Rock became the first team from the East to win the league Championship defeating the Saskatchewan Prairie Fire (26-13) and again the following season (28-14). The Rock lost the Eastern Final to the Niagara Thunder the following year, but returned in 2008 to beat the Calgary Mavericks for a third title, and the final one of the RCSL.

In 2009, Rugby Canada and the IRB decided to expand the NA4 competition to become the Americas Rugby Championship. In this new competition, there would be four Canadian teams, with one to represent Canada's five easternmost provinces, based from St. John's. Additionally, the RCSL was disbanded, to be replaced with a new Under-20 league called the Rugby Canada National Junior Championship. The Rock was chosen as one of the remaining RCSL clubs to enter the newly formed league.
