= 2012 Canadian Rugby Championship =

4th Season of the Canadian Rugby Championship

- Countries: Canada
- Champions: Ontario Blues
- Runners-up: Prairie Wolf Pack
- Matches played: 10

The 2012 Canadian Rugby Championship was the 4th season of the Canadian Rugby Championship.

The Ontario Blues were the 2012 CRC champions, winning the MacTier Cup for the second year in a row.

== Participants ==
| Team | Home stadium(s) |
|---|---|
| The Rock | Swilers Rugby Park, St. John's, NL |
| Ontario Blues | Oakville Crusaders RFC, Oakville, ON; Burlington RFC, Burlington, ON |
| Pacific Tyee | Bear Mountain Stadium, Langford, BC |
| Prairie Wolf Pack | Calgary Rugby Park, Calgary, AB |

== Regular season ==
=== Standings ===
| Place | Team | Games | | | | Points | | | Bonus points | | Table points |
| Place | Team | Played | Won | Lost | Drawn | For | Against | Difference | 4 Tries | 7 Point Loss | Table points |
|---|---|---|---|---|---|---|---|---|---|---|---|
| 1 | Ontario Blues | 5 | 4 | 1 | 0 | 164 | 105 | +59 | 3 | 1 | 20 |
| 2 | Prairie Wolf Pack | 5 | 3 | 2 | 0 | 174 | 123 | +51 | 2 | 2 | 16 |
| 3 | The Rock | 5 | 2 | 3 | 0 | 180 | 131 | -49 | 1 | 2 | 11 |
| 4 | Pacific Tyee | 5 | 1 | 4 | 0 | 111 | 198 | -87 | 0 | 1 | 5 |

=== Fixtures ===
18 Aug 2012
6:00 PM (MDT)

| Prairie Wolf Pack | 64–19 | Pacific Tyee |
| Try: Ian Shoults 5' c, 51' c Gordon McRorie 15' c Nickalas Blevins 19' m, 33' c Christian Wolff 41' c Mozac Samson 44' m Clayton Panga 59' c, 67' m James Buchanan 78' c Con: Christian Wolff (7/10) | Report | Try: Konrad Rybkowski 26' c Matt Yanagiya 61' m Brodie Henderson 67' c Con: Patrick Kay (2/3) |

Calgary Rugby Park
Referee: (Canada) Bryan Arciero

25 Aug 2012
4:30 PM (EDT)

| Ontario Blues | 23–19 | The Rock |
| | Match sheet to come |

Oakville Crusaders RFC

25 Aug 2012
6:30 PM (MDT)

| Prairie Wolf Pack | 45–19 | Pacific Tyee |
| Try: Eric Lopatinsky 1' c, 49' c Josh Hart 29' c, 60' c Evan Thomas 33' c Chris Long 58' c Con: Steven Woodward (6/6); Pen: Steven Woodward (1/1) | Report | Try: Brodie Henderson 37' m, Bryan Tyrer 64' m Con: Bryan Tyrer (0/2); Pen: Bryan Tyrer (3/3) |

Calgary Rugby Park

1 Sept 2012
4:30 PM (EDT)

| Ontario Blues | 31–36 | Pacific Tyee |
| | Report |

Burlington RFC

1 Sep 2012
TBA (NDT)

| The Rock | 18–22 | Prairie Wolf Pack |
| Try: Bob Rogers 13' m Tyler Wish 45' m Benoît Piffero 53' m Con: Ciaran Hearn (0/3); Pen: Ciaran Hearn (1/1) | Report | Try: Gordon McRorie 2' c Chris Long 48' c Clayton Panga 67' m Con: Stephen Woodward (1/1); Christian Wolff (1/2); Pen: Christian Wolff (1/1) |

Swilers Rugby Park

4 Sep 2012
6:30 PM (EDT)

| Ontario Blues | 38–17 | Prairie Wolf Pack |
| | Report |

Oakville Crusaders RFC
Referee: (Canada) Chris Assmus

4 Sep 2012
4:00 PM (NDT)

| The Rock | 26–20 | Pacific Tyee |
| Try: Owen Parfrey 42' m Pen: Ciaran Hearn (7/7) 14' 30' 43' 47' 55' 64' 76' | Report | Try: Scott Mackay 10' m Sean White 49' c Conor Trainor 72' m Con: Connor Braid (1/3); Pen: Connor Braid (1/1) 58' |

Swilers Rugby Park
Referee: (Canada) Bryan Arciero

15 Sep 2012
4:00 PM (PDT)

| Pacific Tyee | 17–32 | Ontario Blues |
| | Report |

Bear Mountain Stadium
Referee: (Canada) David Smortchevsky

15 Sep 2012
TBA (MDT)

| Prairie Wolf Pack | 26–29 | The Rock |
| Try: Casey Reed, Jeff Hassler (2), Hubert Buydens | Report |

Calgary Rugby Park
Referee: (Canada) Sherry Trumbull

22 Sep 2012
TBA (NDT)

| The Rock | 16–40 | Ontario Blues |
| Try: Patrick Parfrey; Con: Ciaran Hearn; Pen: Ciaran Hearn (3) | Report | Try: Dan Moor, John Moonlight (2), Tyler Ardron (2); Con: Derek Daypuck (3); Pen: Derek Daypuck (3) |

Swilers Rugby Park
Referee: (Canada) Chris Assmus

== See also ==
- Canadian Rugby Championship
- Rugby Canada
