= 2010 Canadian Rugby Championship =

2nd season of the Canadian Rugby Championship

- Countries: Canada
- Champions: The Rock
- Runners-up: Prairie Wolf Pack
- Matches played: 7
- Tries scored: 37 (average 5.3 per match)
- Top point scorer: Dean Blanks (32)
- Top try scorer: Geoff Warden (3)

The 2010 CRC Season was the second season of the Canadian Rugby Championship. This was the first year when instead of the CRC Champion advancing to the Americas Rugby Championship, a Canada Selects team was chosen from players participating in the tournament to go on and represent Canada at the international tournament. This was also the first season that included a post-season to decide the winner of the MacTier Cup.

The 2010 Canadian Rugby Championship champions were The Rock, who defeated the Prairie Wolf Pack 19–8, in the nationally televised final.

== Pre-season ==
There was no formal pre-season that the league put in place, so several teams played exhibition games against touring sides in order to prepare themselves for the season.

=== Scores ===
Date	Home	Score	Away
May 15, 2010	Ontario Blues	36-24	UK Police
June 4, 2010	The Rock	6-20	England Counties
June 8, 2010	Ontario Blues	26-32	England Counties
July 10, 2010	Ontario Blues	69-11	Midwest USA

== Regular season ==
=== Structure ===
The round-robin structure with four teams participating in a round-robin format, each team playing against each other team once stayed the same from the previous season, again with no divisions or conferences. There were six games in total.

=== Standings ===
Place	Team	Games				Points			Bonus points		Table points
Place	Team	Played	Won	Lost	Drawn	For	Against	Difference	4 Tries	7 Point Loss	Table points
1	The Rock	3	3	0	0	94	35	59	2	0	14
2	Prairie Wolf Pack	3	2	1	0	79	46	33	1	1	10
3	Ontario Blues	3	1	2	0	68	68	0	1	1	6
4	BC Bears	3	0	3	0	38	130	-92	0	0	0

=== Fixtures ===
August 7

The Rock	33–0	Ontario Blues
Try: Geoff Warden 2, Tyler Wish, Ciaran Hearn, Morgan Lovell; Con: Dean Blanks 4	Report

Swilers Rugby Park
Attendance: 1,000
Referee: Bryan Arciero

August 14

Prairie Wolf Pack	41–6	BC Bears
Try: Nanyak Dala 2, Scott Franklin, Dustin MacPherson, Mozac Samson, James Buchanan; Con: Evan Thomas 2, Stephen Woodward 2 Pen: Stephen Woodward	Report	Pen: Connor Braid 2

Calgary Rugby Park

August 21

Prairie Wolf Pack	15–13	Ontario Blues
Try: Kyle Gilmore, Mozac Samson, Ian Shoults	Report	Try: Ryan Tomlinson; Con: Ander Monro; Pen: Ander Monro 2

Calgary Rugby Park

August 21

BC Bears	12–34	The Rock
Pen: Connor Braid 4	Report	Try: Ken Goodland, Ciaran Hearn, Ben Trevorrow; Con: Dean Blanks 2 Pen: Dean Blanks 5

Klahanie Park, British Columbia

September 4

Ontario Blues	55–20	BC Bears
Try: Mark MacSween 2, Taylor Paris 2, Ryan Tomlinson, Stu Ault, Brett Beukeboom, Derek Daypuck; Con: Ander Monro 6 Pen: Ander Monro	Report	Try: Glen McKinnon, Eric Wilson; Con: Connor Braid 2 Pen: Connor Braid 2

Burlington Rugby Football Club, Ontario
Attendance: 1,000
Referee: Andrew Hosie

September 4

The Rock	27–23	Prairie Wolf Pack
Try: Dean Blanks, Ken Goodland, Geoff Warden, Rob Wilson, Tyler Wish	Report	Try: Luke Cudmore, Dustin MacPherson, Ian Shoults; Pen: Stephen Woodward 2

Swilers Rugby Park
Attendance: 1,500
Referee: Bryan Arciero

== Postseason ==
This was the first year with a postseason, with the second place regular season team visiting the first place team at home, for a final. The final had the Rock beat the Prairie Wolf Pack 19–8 at home, winning their first ever MacTier Cup. The game was broadcast live on CBC, the first CRC game to ever be shown on live nationwide TV.

== See also ==
- Canadian Rugby Championship
- Americas Rugby Championship
- Rugby Canada
