= 2009 Americas Rugby Championship =

2009 ARC Season
- League: Americas Rugby Championship
- Sport: Rugby Union
- Duration: September–October 2009
- Number of teams: 6

Divisional rounds
- Canadian champions: BC Bears
- International champions: Argentina Jaguars

2009 ARC Final
- Champions: Argentina Jaguars

NA4/ARC seasons
- ← 2008 (NA4) 2010 →

The 2009 Americas Rugby Championship season was the inaugural season of the Americas Rugby Championship. The season featured a Canadian division with four teams representing provinces or regions of Canada, along with international A sides from the U.S. and Argentina.

The Canadian Division played a round robin schedule to determine what two teams would play in the Canadian final. The BC Bears went undefeated in round robin play and defeated the Ontario Blues 12–8 in the Canadian final.

The international finalist was decided in a match between the U.S. Select XV and the Argentina Jaguars. The match was won by the Jaguars 57–10.

The ARC Final pitted the BC Bears against the Argentina Jaguars. The Jaguars gave the Bears their only loss of the season in a 35–11 decision. The Ontario Blues defeated the U.S. Selects to take 3rd place.

== Teams ==
Canadian Division

- BC Bears
- Ontario Blues
- Prairie Wolf Pack
- The Rock

International Teams

- Argentina Jaguars
- USA Select XV

== Canadian Division ==
Team	Pld	W	D	L	TF	PF	PA	+/−	BP	Pts
BC Bears	3	3	0	0	12	89	45	+44	2	14
Ontario Blues	3	1	0	2	8	69	48	+21	3	7
The Rock	3	1	0	2	7	43	63	-20	2	6
Prairie Wolf Pack	3	1	0	2	6	51	96	-45	0	4

Top two advance to semi-finals

=== Round Robin Matches ===
2009-09-07
15:00 MDT

Prairie Wolf Pack	23–31	The Rock
Tries: Travis Robertson; Jordan Kohn; Dustin MacPherson; Conv: Stephen Woodward (1/3); Pen: Stephen Woodward (2)		Tries: Chauncey O'Toole; Jebb Sinclair; Frank Walsh; Robert Wilson; Tyler Wish; Conv: Dean Blanks (3/5)

Calgary Rugby Park
Referee: Bryan Arciero

2009-09-12
15:00 PDT

BC Bears	29–24	Ontario Blues
Tries: Sean Duke; Brian Erichsen; Sean White; Nathan Hirayama; Conv: Nathan Hirayama (3/4); Pen: Nathan Hirayama		Tries: Scott Dunham; Colin Brown; Steve Shortly; Conv: Steve Piatek (3/3); Pen: Steve Piatek

Brockton Oval
Referee: Bryan Arciero

2009-09-19
15:00 EDT

Ontario Blues	13–14	Prairie Wolf Pack
Try: Josh Green; Conv: Steve Piatek; Pen: Steve Piatek (2)		Try: Jeremy Kyne; Pen: Stephen Woodward (3)

Fletcher's Fields
Referee: Bryan Arciero

2009-09-19
15:00 NDT

The Rock	7–8	BC Bears
Try: Ciaran Hearn; Conv: Dean Blanks		Try: Harry Jones; Pen: Nathan Hirayama

Swilers Rugby Park

2009-09-26
15:00 EDT

Ontario Blues	32–5	The Rock
Tries: Mark MacSween; Steve Piatek; Mike Scholz; Derek Daypuck; Conv: Steve Piatek (3/4); Pen: Steve Piatek; Derek Daypuck		Try: Frank Walsh

Fletcher's Fields

2009-09-26
15:00 PDT

BC Bears	52–14	Prairie Wolf Pack
Tries: Sean Duke (2); Nathan Hirayama; David Spicer; Adam Van Staveren; Jason Marshall; Mike Burak; Conv: Nathan Hirayama (7/7)		Tries: Stephen Woodward; Kyle Gilmour; Conv: Stephen Woodward (2/2)

Brockton Oval

=== Canadian Final ===
2009-10-10

BC Bears	12–8	Ontario Blues
Pen: Nathan Hirayama (4)		Try: Mike Scholz; Pen: Steve Piatek

MacDonald Park

== International Play ==
=== International Semi-Final Match ===
2009-10-10

USA Select XV	10–57	Argentina Jaguars
Try: Corey Blair; Conv: Volney Rouse; Pen: Volney Rouse		Tries: Lucas Barrera Oro; Martín Bustos Moyano; Dino Cáceres; Juan Jose Imhoff; Horacio Alberto San Martín; Federico Nicolás Sánchez; Leonardo Senatore; Benjamín Urdapilleta; Conv: Benjamín Urdapilleta (7/8); Pen: Benjamín Urdapilleta

Glendale Infinity Park

== Final Matches ==
=== 3rd-place Match ===
2009-10-17

Ontario Blues	27–24	USA Select XV
Tries: Mark MacSween; Mike Scholz; Conv: Steve Piatek (1/2); Pen: Steve Piatek (5)		Tries: Kevin Swiryn (3); Conv: Volney Rouse (2); Nese Malifa; Pen: Nese Malifa

Fletcher's Fields

=== Championship final Match ===
2009-10-17

BC Bears	11–35	Argentina Jaguars
Try: Nathan Hirayama; Pen: Nathan Hirayama (2)		Tries: Martín Bustos Moyano; Agustín Creevy; Benjamín Macome; Matías Narváez; Joaquín Tuculet; Conv: Benjamín Urdapilleta (3); Martín Bustos Moyano; Benjamín Macome

Fletcher's Fields

== Exhibition Matches ==
2009-10-21

Canada A	16–42	Argentina Jaguars
Try: Nanyak Dala; Conv: Nathan Hirayama; Pen: Nathan Hirayama (3)		Tries: Martín Bustos Moyano; Juan Imhoff (3); Facundo Vega; Conv: Facundo Vega (1/5); Pen: Martín Bustos Moyano (4); Nicolás Sánchez

Chatham-Kent, Ontario
Attendance: 1,130
