= 2014 Canadian Rugby Championship =

- Countries: Canada
- Champions: Ontario Blues
- Runners-up: Prairie Wolf Pack
- Matches played: 12

Official website
- www.canadianrugbychampionship.com

The 2014 Canadian Rugby Championship was the 6th season of the Canadian Rugby Championship. The competition took place between August 9 and September 27, 2014. The format for the 2014 season changed with the tournament seeing each team play a home-and-away series against each of their three opponents for a total of six games.

== Teams ==
Team	Home stadium(s)
Atlantic Rock	Swilers Rugby Park, St. John's, NL
Ontario Blues	Lindsay RFC, Lindsay, ON; Burlington RFC, Burlington, ON
BC Bears	Apple Bowl, Kelowna, BC; Klahanie Park, West Vancouver, BC; Westhills Stadium, Langford, BC
Prairie Wolf Pack	Calgary Rugby Park, Calgary, AB

== Standings ==
Place	Team	Games				Points			Bonus points		Table points
Place	Team	Played	Won	Lost	Drawn	For	Against	Difference	4 Tries	7 Point Loss	Table points
1	Ontario Blues	6	5	1	0	178	79	+99	3	1	24
2	Prairie Wolf Pack	6	5	1	0	177	82	+95	3	0	23
3	BC Bears	6	2	4	0	133	146	-13	2	0	10
4	Atlantic Rock	6	0	6	0	57	238	-181	0	1	1

== Fixtures ==
All times local to where the game is being played

=== Week 1 ===
9 August 2014
6:30 PM

Prairie Wolf Pack	31–10	BC Bears
Try: Graham Turner c Evan Olmstead 25' m Adam Bontus 48' c Jeremy Kyne; Brendan Harrison; Con: Gordon McRorie (2/3); Adam McQueen (1/1)	Report	Try: Caleb Hansen; Con: Bryan Tyrer (1/1); Pen: Bryan Tyrer 2'

Calgary Rugby Park, Calgary

=== Week 2 ===
16 August 2014
4:30 PM

Ontario Blues	20–11	Atlantic Rock
Try: Ray Barkwill 4' c Hank McQueen 45' c Con: Derek Daypuck (2/2); Pen: Derek Daypuck (2/2)	Report	Try: Patrick McNicholas 40' m Con: Patrick McNicholas (0/1); Pen: Patrick McNicholas (2/2)

Twin Elm Rugby Park, Ottawa

16 August 2014
7:00 PM

BC Bears	3–30	Prairie Wolf Pack
Pen: Bryan Tyrer	Report	Try: Shea O'Hallahan c Nick Blevins c Gordon McRorie c Con: Gordon McRorie (3/3); Pen: Gordon McRorie (3/4)

Apple Bowl, Kelowna

=== Week 3 ===
4 September 2014
6:30 PM

Prairie Wolf Pack	3–28	Ontario Blues
Pen: Gordon McRorie		Try: Jordan Wilson-Ross (2); Richard Lebel; Jake Webster; Con: Derek Daypuck; Pen: Derek Daypuck (2)

Ellerlsie Rugby Park, Edmonton

4 September 2014
6:00 PM

BC Bears	63–6	Atlantic Rock
Try: Caleb Hansen (2); Sean White (2); Patrick Kay; Admir Cejvanovic; Justin Douglas; Sean Ferguson; Michael Fuailefau; Con: Patrick Kay (5); Pen: Patrick Kay (2)		Pen: Patrick McNicholas (2)

Klahanie Park, West Vancouver

=== Week 4 ===
7 September 2014
1:00 PM

BC Bears	20–30	Ontario Blues
Try: Bryan Tyer; Sean White; Con: Patrick Kay; Pen: Patrick Kay		Try: Dan Moor (2); Haddon Murray; Seb Pearson; Con: Derek Daypuck (2); Pen: Derek Daypuck (2)

Klahanie Park, West Vancouver

7 September 2014
1:00 PM

Prairie Wolf Pack	53–5	Atlantic Rock
Try: Gordon McRorie (3); Graham Turner (2); Clayton Panga; Adam Bontus; Matt Harrison; Jeremy Kyne; Con: Adam McQueen (2); Gordon McRorie (2)		Try: Alex Rogers

Calgary Rugby Park, Calgary

=== Week 5 ===
18 September 2014
6:00 PM

Atlantic Rock	10–31	Prairie Wolf Pack
Try: Ben Harris; Con: Ciaran Hearn; Pen: Ciaran Hearn	Report	Try: Peter Houlihan; Clay Panga; Jeremy Kyne; Kyle Gilmour; Con: Gordon McRorie (4); Pen: Gordon McRorie

Swilers Rugby Park

18 September 2014
6:00 PM

Ontario Blues	29–11	BC Bears
Try: Tom Dolezel; Ray Barkwill; Con: Derek Daypuck (2); Pen: Derek Daypuck (5)	Report	Try: Sean White; Pen: Patrick Kay (2)

University of Guelph, Guelph

=== Week 6 ===
21 September 2014
1:00 PM

Ontario Blues	26–29	Prairie Wolf Pack
Try: Seb Pearson; Jake Webster; Con: Derek Daypuck (2); Pen: Derek Daypuck (4)	Report	Try: Shea O'Hallan; Graham Turner; Con: Gordon McRorie (2); Pen: Gordon McRorie (5)

Peterborough Rugby Club, Peterborough

21 September 2014
3:00 PM

Atlantic Rock	20–26	BC Bears
Try: Charles DeBove; Mike Hamson; Adam Paul; Con: Ciaran Hearn; Pen: Ciaran Hearn	Report	Try: Nathan Yanagiya; Cody McLary; Patrick Kay; Sandover Best; Con: Patrick Kay (3)

Swilers Rugby Park, St. John's

=== Week 7 ===
27 September 2014
3:00 PM

Atlantic Rock	5–45	Ontario Blues
	Report

Swilers Rugby Park, St. John's

== See also ==
- Canadian Rugby Championship
- Rugby Canada
