= 2013 Canadian Rugby Championship =

- Countries: Canada
- Champions: Ontario Blues
- Runners-up: BC Bears
- Matches played: 10
- Top point scorer: Gordon McRorie (48)
- Top try scorer: Duncan Maguire (6)

Official website
- www.canadianrugbychampionship.com

The 2013 Canadian Rugby Championship was the 5th season of the Canadian Rugby Championship. The BC Bears re-enter the tournament after being represented by the Pacific Tyee last season. Continuing with the pattern established previous seasons, home field advantage has switched. The Western teams have three home games, while the Eastern teams only have two.

== Participants ==
| Team | Home stadium(s) |
|---|---|
| Atlantic Rock | Swilers Rugby Park, St. John's, NL |
| Ontario Blues | Lindsay RFC, Lindsay, ON; Burlington RFC, Burlington, ON |
| BC Bears | Bear Mountain Stadium, Langford, BC; UBC Wolfson Fields, Vancouver, BC |
| Prairie Wolf Pack | Calgary Rugby Park, Calgary, AB |

== Regular season ==
=== Standings ===
| Place | Team | Games | | | | Points | | | Bonus points | Table points |
| Place | Team | Played | Won | Lost | Drawn | For | Against | Difference | Bonus points | Table points |
|---|---|---|---|---|---|---|---|---|---|---|
| 1 | Ontario Blues | 5 | 5 | 0 | 0 | 167 | 105 | +62 | 3 | 23 |
| 2 | BC Bears | 5 | 2 | 3 | 0 | 135 | 128 | +7 | 4 | 12 |
| 3 | Prairie Wolf Pack | 5 | 2 | 3 | 0 | 133 | 157 | -24 | 2 | 10 |
| 4 | Atlantic Rock | 5 | 1 | 4 | 0 | 109 | 154 | -45 | 2 | 6 |

=== Fixtures ===
All times local to where the game is being played

10 Aug 2013
7:00 PM

| BC Bears | 21-30 | Prairie Wolf Pack |
| Try: Govorchin, MacKay, Morrison; Con: Braid (3/3) | Report | Try: Maguire (2), Gilmour; Con: McRorie (3/3); Pen: McRorie (2/2); Drop: Pocock |

UBC Wolfson Fields

17 Aug 2013
7:30 PM

| Ontario Blues | 27-25 | Atlantic Rock |
| Try: MacSween (2), Stones; Con: Piatek (3/3); Pen: Daypuck, Piatek | Report | Try: Coughlan (2), Parfrey; Con: Wilson (2/3) |

Burlington RFC

24 Aug 2013
3:00 PM

| Atlantic Rock | 16-14 | Prairie Wolf Pack |
| Try: Hawes, Maguire; Con: McRorie (2/2) | Report |

Swilers Rugby Park

30 Aug 2013
7:30 PM

| BC Bears | v | Ontario Blues |

Westhills Stadium

30 Aug 2013
7:00 PM

| Prairie Wolf Pack | v | Atlantic Rock |

Calgary Rugby Park

2 Sept 2013
1:00 PM

| Prairie Wolf Pack | v | Ontario Blues |

Calgary Rugby Park

2 Sept 2013
7:30 PM

| BC Bears | v | Atlantic Rock |

Westhills Stadium

14 Sept 2013
4:30 PM

| Ontario Blues | v | BC Bears |

Lindsay RFC

21 Sept 2013
3:00 PM

| Ontario Blues | v | Atlantic Rock |

Swiler's Rugby Complex

21 Sept 2013
7:30 PM

| Prairie Wolf Pack | v | BC Bears |

Swiler's Rugby Complex

== See also ==
- Canadian Rugby Championship
- Rugby Canada
