= List of Ontario Blues matches =

The Ontario Blues rugby union team play in the Canadian Rugby Championship, which they won six times between 2011 and 2018.

== 2009 season ==
| Date | Home team | Score | Away team | Location | Notes |
|---|---|---|---|---|---|
| August 22 | Midwest Thunderbirds | 5–38 | Ontario Blues | Moose Rugby Grounds, Elkhart, IN | Preseason friendly |
| September 12 | BC Bears | 29–24 | Ontario Blues | Brockton Oval, Vancouver, BC | |
| September 19 | Ontario Blues | 13–14 | Prairie Wolf Pack | Fletcher's Fields, Markham, ON | |
| September 26 | Ontario Blues | 32–5 | The Rock | Fletcher's Fields, Markham, ON | |
| October 10 | BC Bears | 12–8 | Ontario Blues | MacDonald Park, Victoria, BC | ARC Canadian Final |
| October 17 | U.S. Select XV | 24–27 | Ontario Blues | Fletcher's Fields, Markham, ON | ARC Bronze Medal Match |

== 2010 season ==
| Date | Home team | Score | Away team | Location | Notes |
|---|---|---|---|---|---|
| June 8 | Ontario Blues | 26–32 | England Counties | Crusader Park, Oakville, ON | Preseason friendly |
| July 10 | Ontario Blues | 69–11 | Midwest Thunderbirds | Noem Perry Park, Sarnia, ON | Preseason friendly |
| August 7 | The Rock | 33–0 | Ontario Blues | Swiler's Rugby Complex, St. John's, NL | |
| August 21 | Prairie Wolf Pack | 15–13 | Ontario Blues | Calgary Rugby Park, Calgary, AB | |
| September 4 | Ontario Blues | 55–20 | BC Bears | Burlington RFC, Burlington, ON | |

== 2011 season ==
| Date | Home team | Score | Away team | Location | Notes |
|---|---|---|---|---|---|
| July 30 | Prairie Wolf Pack | 31–25 | Ontario Blues | Calgary Rugby Park, Calgary, AB | |
| August 2 | BC Bears | 21–46 | Ontario Blues | Klahanie Park, Vancouver, BC | |
| August 20 | The Rock | 7–41 | Ontario Blues | Swilers Rugby Complex, St. John's, NL | |
| August 27 | Ontario Blues | 15–0 | Prairie Wolf Pack | Burlington RFC, Burlington, ON | |
| September 3 | Ontario Blues | 21–19 | The Rock | Burlington RFC, Burlington, ON | |

== 2012 season ==
| Date | Home team | Score | Away team | Location | Notes |
|---|---|---|---|---|---|
| May 5 | Chile National Team | 19–17 | Ontario Blues | Santiago, Chile | South American Tour |
| May 8 | Salta Province | 26–32 | Ontario Blues | Salta, Argentina | South American Tour |
| May 13 | Uruguay National Team | 16–27 | Ontario Blues | Montevideo, Uruguay | South American Tour |
| Aug 25 | Ontario Blues | 23–19 | Atlantic Rock | Oakville, Ontario | |
| Sept 1 | Ontario Blues | 31–36 | Pacific Tyee | Burlington, Ontario | |
| Sept 4 | Ontario Blues | 38–17 | Prairie Wolf Pack | Oakville, Ontario | |
| Sept 15 | Prairie Wolf Pack | 17–32 | Ontario Blues | Langford, British Columbia | |
| Sept 22 | Atlantic Rock | 16–40 | Ontario Blues | St John's, Newfoundland | |

== 2013 season ==
| Date | Home team | Score | Away team | Location | Notes |
|---|---|---|---|---|---|
| May 4 | New York Athletic Club RFC | 23–38 | Ontario Blues | Travers Island, New York | Friendly |
| August 17 | Ontario Blues | | Atlantic Rock | Burlington, Ontario | |
| August 23 | Ontario Blues | | Life University | Oakville, Ontario | Friendly |
| August 30 | BC Bears | | Ontario Blues | Westhills Stadium | |
| September 2 | Prairie Wolf Pack | | Ontario Blues | Calgary Rugby Park | |
| September 14 | Ontario Blues | | BC Bears | Lindsay, Ontario | |
| September 21 | Atlantic Rock | | Ontario Blues | Swiler's Rugby Complex | |

== 2014 season ==
| Date | Time | Away | Score | Home | Score | Venue |
|---|---|---|---|---|---|---|
| Sep 4 | 6:30P | BLUES | 28 (+1) | WOLF PACK | 3 | Ellerlsie Rugby Park |
| Sep 7 | 1:00P PST | BLUES | 30 (+1) | BEARS | 20 | Klahanie Park |
| Sep 18 | 8:00P EST | BEARS | 11 | BLUES | 29 | University of Guelph |
| Sep 21 | 1:00P EST | WOLF PACK | 29 | BLUES | 26 (+1) | Peterborough Rugby Club |
| Sep 27 | 3:00P | BLUES | 45 (+1) | ROCK | 5 | Swilers Rugby Complex |

== 2015 season ==
CRC Schedule:

Winners Advance to Final
| EP | Sun, Jun. 28 | 1:00P | BLUES | 44 (+1) | ROCK | 22 | Calgary Rugby Park |

Championship Game
| EP | Wed, Jul. 1 | 1:00P | WOLF PACK | 33 | BLUES | 25 | Calgary Rugby Park |

== 2016 season ==
| DATE | TIME | | | AWAY | | HOME | |
| EX | Sun, May. 22 | 1:00P | BLUES | 19 | Alberta Selects | 9 | Ellerlsie Rugby Park |

| RR | Sat, Jun. 4 | 5:00P | ROCK | 22 | BLUES | 12 | Burlington RFC |
| EX | Sat, Jun. 11 | 3:30P | England Counties | | BLUES | | Fletchers Field |

| DATE | TIME | | | AWAY | | HOME | LOC |
| RR | Sat, Jul. 2 | 3:00P | BLUES | 24 (+1) | ROCK | 13 | Swilers Rugby Complex |
| RR | Thu, Jul. 21 | 6:30P | WOLF PACK | 0 | BLUES | 18 | Fletchers Field |
| RR | Sun, Jul. 24 | 3:30P | BEARS | 21 | BLUES | 50 (+1) | Fletchers Field |

**With the win over the BC Bears on July 24, Ontario won their 5th MacTier Cup

| DATE | TIME | | | AWAY | | HOME | |
| EX | Mon, Aug. 29 | 6:00P | Cork Constitution | | BLUES | | Twin Elm Rugby Park |

== 2017 season ==
Sat April 29-Ontario Blues @ New York Old Blue, Randalls Island NYC, KO TBD

Sat May 20-Glendale Raptors @ Blues, Sherwood Forest Park, Burlington, Kickoff: 3 pm

Sat June 24-Eastern Ontario @ Blues A, Oakville, KO TBD

Fri June 30-Rock A @ Blues A, Lindsay ON, 7 pm

Mon July 3-Rock @ Blues, Peterborough ON, 1 pm

Sat July 22-Blues @ Rock, Truro NS, 5 pm (League Game 1)

Sun Aug 13-Blues @ Wolfpack, Calgary, 530 pm (League Game 2)

Wed Aug 16-Blues v BC Bears, Calgary, 6 pm (League Game 3)

Sat Aug 19-Blues v TBD, Calgary, MacTier Cup finals Day (League Game 4)
