= 2016 Canadian Rugby Championship =

- Countries: Canada
- Champions: Ontario Blues (5th Title)
- Runners-up: Prairie Wolf Pack
- Matches played: 8
- Top point scorer: Brock Staller, BC Bears, 40
- Top try scorer: Aidan McMullan, Atlantic Rock, 3

Official website
- www.americasrugbynews.com/competitions/2016-canadian-rugby-championship/

The 2016 Canadian Rugby Championship was the 8th season of the Canadian Rugby Championship. The competition took place between June 4 and July 24, 2016. The format for the 2016 season saw a round-robin system where each team play their regional opponent home-and-away and the two teams from the opposite region once, for a total of four games each.

The Ontario Blues won their fifth Championship, reclaiming the MacTier Cup from the Prairie Wolf Pack.

== Teams ==
Team	Home stadium(s)
Atlantic Rock	Swilers Rugby Park, St. John's, NL
Ontario Blues	Fletcher’s Fields, Markham, ON; Sherwood Forest Park, Burlington, ON
BC Bears	Bullen Park, Esquimalt, BC
Prairie Wolf Pack	Calgary Rugby Park, Calgary, AB

== Standings ==
Place	Team	Games				Points			Bonus points		Table points
Place	Team	Played	Won	Lost	Drawn	For	Against	Difference	4 Tries	7 Point Loss	Table points
1	Ontario Blues	4	3	1	0	104	56	+48	2	0	14
2	Prairie Wolf Pack	4	3	1	0	73	76	-3	1	0	13
3	Atlantic Rock	4	2	2	0	75	63	+12	0	1	9
4	BC Bears	4	0	4	0	65	122	-57	0	1	1

== Fixtures ==
All times local to where the game is being played

=== Week 1 ===
4 June 2016

Ontario Blues	12–22	Atlantic Rock
	Report

Sherwood Forest Park

=== Week 2 ===
2 July 2016

Atlantic Rock	13–24	Ontario Blues
	Report

Swilers Rugby Park

2 July 2016

Prairie Wolf Pack	27–21
	Report

Calgary Rugby Park

=== Week 3 ===
9 July 2016

BC Bears	17–25	Prairie Wolf Pack
	Report

Bullen Park

=== Week 4 ===
21 July 2016

Atlantic Rock	20–6	BC Bears
	Report

Swilers Rugby Park

21 July 2016

Ontario Blues	18–0	Prairie Wolf Pack
	Report

Fletcher’s Fields

=== Week 5 ===
24 July 2016

Ontario Blues	50–21	BC Bears
	Report

Fletcher’s Fields

24 July 2016

Atlantic Rock	20–21	Prairie Wolf Pack
	Report

Swilers Rugby Park

== See also ==
- Canadian Rugby Championship
- Rugby Canada
