= 2017 Canadian Rugby Championship =

- Countries: Canada
- Champions: BC Bears (2nd Title)
- Runners-up: Ontario Blues
- Matches played: 8
- Top point scorer: Giuseppe du Toit, BC Bears, 42
- Top try scorer: Kainoa Lloyd, Ontario Blues, 5

Official website
- www.americasrugbynews.com/competitions/2017-canadian-rugby-championship/

The 2017 Canadian Rugby Championship was the 9th season of the Canadian Rugby Championship. The competition took place between July 14 and August 19, 2017. The format for the 2016 season saw a round-robin system where each team plays each other once, the top two teams then meet in the final.

The BC Bears won their second Championship, claiming the MacTier Cup for the first time since 2009.

== Teams ==
Team	Home stadium(s)
Atlantic Rock	Farnham Mill Rugby Park, Truro, NL
Ontario Blues	-
BC Bears	Thunderbird Stadium, Vancouver, BC
Prairie Wolf Pack	Calgary Rugby Park, Calgary, AB

== Standings ==
Place	Team	Games				Points			Bonus points		Table points
Place	Team	Played	Won	Lost	Drawn	For	Against	Difference	4 Tries	7 Point Loss	Table points
1	BC Bears	3	3	0	0	104	56	+48	2	0	14
2	Ontario Blues	3	2	1	0	73	76	-3	1	0	12
3	Atlantic Rock	3	1	2	0	63	73	-10	0	1	7
4	Prairie Wolf Pack	3	0	3	0	51	121	-70	0	2	2

== Fixtures ==
All times local to where the game is being played

=== Week 1 ===
14 July 2017

BC Bears	43–0	Prairie Wolf Pack
	Report

Thunderbird Stadium

=== Week 2 ===
22 July 2016

Atlantic Rock	17–24	Ontario Blues
	Report

Farnham Mill Rugby Park

=== Week 3 ===
13 August 2017

Prairie Wolf Pack	22–45	Ontario Blues
	Report

Calgary Rugby Park

13 August 2017

BC Bears	20–13	Atlantic Rock
	Report

Calgary Rugby Park

=== Week 4 ===
16 August 2017

BC Bears	34–31	Ontario Blues
	Report

Calgary Rugby Park

16 August 2017

Prairie Wolf Pack	29–33	Atlantic Rock
	Report

Calgary Rugby Park

=== 3rd-place play-off ===
19 August 2017

Atlantic Rock	19–41	Prairie Wolf Pack
	Report

Calgary Rugby Park

=== Final ===
19 August 2017

BC Bears	30–29	Ontario Blues
	Report

Calgary Rugby Park

== See also ==
- Canadian Rugby Championship
- Rugby Canada
