= 2009 Canadian Rugby Championship =

- Countries: Canada
- Champions: BC Bears
- Runners-up: Ontario Blues
- Matches played: 6
- Tries scored: 33 (average 5.5 per match)
- Top point scorer: Nathan Hirayama (BC Bears) (36)
- Top try scorer: Sean Duke (BC Bears) (3)

The 2009 Canadian Rugby Championship was the inaugural season of the CRC, Canada's highest level of domestic rugby competition. The BC Bears won the MacTier Cup going undefeated, while the Ontario Blues finished as runners-up, allowing them both to advance to the Americas Rugby Championship.

Nathan Hirayama's 36 points scored in the regular season is an all-time record for the league, during the 6 game format. The format was later changed to 10 games in the regular season, where in 2011 Dean Blanks scored 55 points, holding the current league record for points scored, albeit having played three more games.

== The Season ==
=== Structure ===
The 2009 CRC season included four Canadian senior representative teams—the BC Bears, the Prairie Wolf Pack, the Ontario Blues, and The Rock, playing against each other in a round-robin format, similar to that of The Rugby Championship, with the team that has collected the most points during the season being named champions. There were no divisions or conferences. Six games were played, each team playing every other team once. In lieu of a post-season, the champion and runner-up both continued on to participate in the ARC.

=== Standings ===
Place	Team	Games				Points			Bonus points		Table points
Place	Team	Played	Won	Lost	Drawn	For	Against	Difference	4 Tries	7 Point Loss	Table points
1	BC Bears	3	3	0	0	89	45	44	2	0	14
2	Ontario Blues	3	1	2	0	69	48	21	1	2	7
3	The Rock	3	1	2	0	43	63	−20	1	1	6
4	Prairie Wolf Pack	3	1	2	0	51	96	−45	0	0	4

== See also ==
- Canadian Rugby Championship
- Americas Rugby Championship
- Rugby Canada
