= 2018 Canadian Rugby Championship =

- Countries: Canada
- Champions: Ontario Blues (6th title)
- Runners-up: Atlantic Rock
- Matches played: 8
- Top point scorer: Cooper Coats, Atlantic Rock, 44
- Top try scorer: Grant Crowell, Prairie Wolf Pack, 5

Official website
- www.americasrugbynews.com/competitions/2018-canadian-rugby-championship/

The 2018 Canadian Rugby Championship was the 10th season of the Canadian Rugby Championship. The competition took place between July 27 and August 26, 2018. The format for the 2018 season saw two double headed regional matches, followed by semi-finals and ranking finals.

The Ontario Blues beat the Atlantic Rock in the final; claiming their sixth Canadian Rugby Championship.

== Teams ==
- Atlantic Rock
- Ontario Blues
- BC Bears
- Prairie Wolf Pack

== Fixtures ==
=== Regional playoffs ===
==== Western Canada ====
27 July

Prairie Wolf Pack	27–24	BC Bears
	Report

Calgary Rugby Park

3 August

BC Bears	37–20	Prairie Wolf Pack
	Report

Klahanie Park, Vancouver

- BC Bears win 61–47 on aggregate

==== Eastern Canada ====
4 August

Atlantic Rock	34–22	Ontario Blues
	Report

Concordia University, Montreal

7 August

Ontario Blues	22–9	Atlantic Rock
	Report

Sherwood Forest Park, Burlington

- Ontario Blues win 44–43 on aggregate

=== Semifinals ===
23 August

Atlantic Rock	31–14	Prairie Wolf Pack
	Report

Calgary Rugby Park

23 August

BC Bears	36–58	Ontario Blues
	Report

Calgary Rugby Park

=== 3rd place ===
26 August

Prairie Wolf Pack	32–48	BC Bears
	Report

Calgary Rugby Park

=== Final ===
26 August

Atlantic Rock	17–22	Ontario Blues
	Report

Calgary Rugby Park

== See also ==
- Canadian Rugby Championship
- Rugby Canada
