= 2015 Canadian Rugby Championship =

- Countries: Canada
- Champions: Prairie Wolf Pack
- Runners-up: Ontario Blues
- Matches played: 4

Official website
- www.canadianrugbychampionship.com

The 2015 Canadian Rugby Championship was the 7th season of the Canadian Rugby Championship. It took place from June 28 to July 1, 2015. The 2015 season saw a change in format, featuring a two-stage knockout series among four teams in Calgary, totaling four games.

The Prairie Wolf Pack beat the Ontario Blues in the final; claiming their first Canadian Rugby Championship, meaning all participating teams have now won the Championship.

== Teams ==
Team
Atlantic Rock
Ontario Blues
BC Bears
Prairie Wolf Pack

== Fixtures ==
All times local to where the game is being played

=== Semi-finals ===
28 June 2015

| Ontario Blues | 44-22 | Atlantic Rock |

Calgary Rugby Park, Calgary

28 June 2015

| Prairie Wolf Pack | 57–7 | BC Bears |

Calgary Rugby Park, Calgary

=== 3rd-place play-off ===
1 July 2015

| Atlantic Rock | 30–31 | BC Bears |

Calgary Rugby Park, Calgary

=== Final ===
1 July 2015

| Prairie Wolf Pack | 33–25 | Ontario Blues |
| | Report |

Calgary Rugby Park, Calgary

== See also ==
- Canadian Rugby Championship
- Rugby Canada
