= 2008 Canada rugby union tour of Europe =

Summary
P	W	D	L
Total
4	1	0	3
Test match
4	1	0	3
Opponent
P	W	D	L
Portugal
1	1	0	0
Ireland
1	0	0	1
Wales
1	0	0	1
Scotland
1	0	0	1

The 2008 Canada rugby union tour of Europe was a series of matches played in November 2008 in Europe by Canada national rugby union team. Canadian won only the first match against Portugal, and lost the other three.

== Results ==
=== Portugal ===
1 November 2008

Portugal	13–21	Canada
Try: Silva; Con: Leal; Pen: Leal 2	report	Try: Kleeberger, Pritchard; Con: Pritchard; Pen: Pritchard 3

Est. Universitario, Lisbona
Referee: Peter Allan (Scotland)

Portugal			Canada
Pedro Silva	FB	15	FB	James Pritchard
Aderito Esteves	W	14	W	Dean van Camp
David Mateus	C	13	C	Bryn Keys
Diogo Mateus	C	12	C	Ryan Smith
Goncalo Foro	W	11	W	Phil MacKenzie
Pedro Cabral	FH	10	FH	Ander Monro
Pedro Leal	SH	9	SH	Morgan Williams
Tiago Girao	N8	8	N8	Aaron Carpenter
Salvador Palha	F	7	F	Adam Kleeberger
Vasco Uva	F	6	F	Andrew Fagan
(yellow card) Juan Severino Somoza	L	5	L	Stu Ault
David dos Reis	L	4	L	Tyler Hotson
Diogo Fialho	P	3	P	Mike Pletch
João Correia	H	2	H	Pat Riordan
Joao Junior	P	1	P	Kevin Tkachuk
		Replacements
(substituted on) Juan Murre	P	16		Frank Walsh
(substituted on) Duarte Figueiredo	P	17		Travis Robertson
(substituted on) Valter Jorge	L	18		Luke Cudmore
(substituted on) Julien Bardy	F	19	F	Jebb Sinclair (substituted on)
Lourenco Kadosh		20		Sean Duke
(substituted on) Duarte Pinto	FH	21	FH	Nathan Hirayama (substituted on)
(substituted on) Diogo Gama	W	22		Sean White
		Coaches
(Portugal) Tomaz Morais				Kieran Crowley (New Zealand)

=== Ireland ===
8 November 2008

Ireland	55–0	Canada
Try: Earls 2', Kearney 13'; Heaslip 30' Keaney 35'; Bowe 40', D. Wallace 67'; Quinlan 80', Bowe 80+6'; Con: O'Gara 3' 14' 31' 36' 40'; P Wallace 68'; Pen: O' Gara 6'	report

Thomond Park, Limerick
Attendance: 22,000
Referee: Christophe Berdos (France)

Ireland			Canada
Keith Earls	FB	15	FB	James Pritchard (substituted off) 61'
Tommy Bowe	W	14	W	Ciaran Hearn
(substituted off) 62' (capt.) Brian O'Driscoll	C	13	C	Bryn Keys
Luke Fitzgerald	C	12	C	Ryan Smith
Rob Kearney	W	11	W	Justin Mensah-Coker
(substituted off) 56' Ronan O'Gara	FH	10	FH	Ander Monro (substituted off) 65'
(substituted off) 55' Eoin Reddan	SH	9	SH	Ed Fairhurst
(substituted off) 58' Jamie Heaslip	N8	8	N8	Aaron Carpenter
Shane Jennings	F	7	F	Adam Kleeberger
Stephen Ferris	F	6	F	Sean-Michael Stephen (substituted off) 45'
(substituted off) 56' Paul O'Connell	L	5	L	Josh Jackson
Donncha O'Callaghan	L	4	L	Mike Burak (substituted off) 73'
(substituted off) 41' (substituted on) 70'Tony Buckley	P	3	P	Jon Thiel
(substituted off) 41' Jerry Flannery	H	2	H	Pat Riordan (capt.) (substituted off) 75'
(substituted off) 70' Marcus Horan	P	1	P	Kevin Tkachuk (substituted off) 70'
		Replacements
(substituted on) 41' Rory Best	H	16	H	Mike Pletch (substituted on) 75'
(substituted on) 41' John Hayes	P	17	P	Frank Walsh (substituted on) 70'
(substituted on) 56' Alan Quinlan	L	18	L	Tyler Hotson (substituted on) 73'
(substituted on) 58' David Wallace	N8	19	F	Jebb Sinclair (substituted on) 45'
(substituted on) 55' Peter Stringer	SH	20	C	Morgan Williams
(substituted on) 56' Paddy Wallace	FH	21	FH	Matt Evans (substituted on) 65'
(substituted on) 62' Shane Horgan	C	22	FB	Phil MacKenzie (substituted on) 61'
		Coaches
(Ireland) Declan Kidney				Kieran Crowley (New Zealand)

=== Wales ===
14 November 2008

Wales	34–13	Canada
Try: Stoddart 24', Halfpenny 39'; Penalty try 58', 70'; Halfpenny 80'; Con: Biggar 59' 71' 80'; Pen: Biggar 46'	report	Try: Smith 73'; Con: Pritchard 74'; Pen: Pritchard 9' 31'

Millennium, Cardiff
Attendance: 59,000
Referee: Stuart Dickinson (Australia)

Wales			Canada
Morgan Stoddart	FB	15	FB	James Pritchard
Leigh Halfpenny	W	14	W	Ciaran Hearn (substituted off) 69'
(substituted off) 45' Tom Shanklin	C	13	C	Bryn Keys (substituted off) 60'
Andrew Bishop	C	12	C	Ryan Smith
Mark Jones	W	11	W	Justin Mensah-Coker
(substituted off) 18' James Hook	FH	10	FH	Ander Monro
(substituted off) 51' Martin Roberts	SH	9	SH	Ed Fairhurst 22' to 32' (substituted off) 57'
(substituted off) 51' (capt.) Ryan Jones	N8	8	N8	Aaron Carpenter
Robin Sowden-Taylor	F	7	F	Adam Kleeberger
Dafydd Jones	F	6	F	Jebb Sinclair (substituted off) 53'
Luke Charteris	L	5	L	Josh Jackson
Ian Gough	L	4	L	Tyler Hotson (substituted off) 60'
(substituted off) 51' Rhys M. Thomas	P	3	P	Jon Thiel (substituted off) 37'
Richard Hibbard	H	2	H	Pat Riordan (capt.)
John Yapp	P	1	P	Kevin Tkachuk (substituted off) 71'
		Replacements
Matthew Rees		16	P	Mike Pletch (substituted on) 37'
(substituted on) 64' Eifion Lewis-Roberts	P	17	P	Frank Walsh (substituted on) 71'
Alun Wyn Jones		18	L	Mike Burak (substituted on) 60'
(substituted on) 51' Andy Powell	N8	19	N8	Sean-Michael Stephen (substituted on) 53'
(substituted on) 51' Dwayne Peel	SH	20	SH	Morgan Williams (substituted on) (substituted off) 22'-32' (substituted on) 57'
(substituted on) 18' Dan Biggar	FH	21	W	Matt Evans (substituted on) 69'
(substituted on) 45' Jamie Roberts	C	22	C	Dean van Camp (substituted on) 60'
		Coaches
(New Zealand) Warren Gatland				Kieran Crowley (New Zealand)

=== Scotland ===
22 November 2008

Scotland	41–0	Canada
Try: Walker 2', 70', Cairns 37'; Barclay 41', Strokosch 56'; Lamont73'; Con: Godman 38', 42', 57'; Parks 71'; Pen: Godman 32'	report

Pittodrie, Aberdeen
Attendance: 18,000
Referee: George Clancy (Ireland)

Scotland			Canada
Rory Lamont	FB	15	FB	James Pritchard
(substituted off) 64' Simon Webster	W	14	W	Sean Duke
Ben Cairns	C	13	C	Ciaran Hearn (substituted off) 61'
Nick de Luca	C	12	C	Ryan Smith
Nikki Walker	W	11	W	Justin Mensah-Coker
(substituted off) 58' Phil Godman	FH	10	FH	Matt Evans (substituted off) 47'
(substituted off) 58' (capt.) Mike Blair	SH	9	SH	Ed Fairhurst (c) (substituted off) 52'
Simon Taylor	N8	8	N8	Aaron Carpenter (substituted off) 72'
(substituted off) 51' John Barclay	F	7	F	Adam Kleeberger
Alasdair Strokosch	F	6	F	Jebb Sinclair (substituted off) 72'
Jim Hamilton	L	5	L	Josh Jackson (substituted off) 52'
(substituted off) 75' Nathan Hines	L	4	L	Tyler Hotson
Euan Murray	P	3	P	Scott Franklin
(substituted off) 64' Ross Ford	H	2	H	Mike Pletch
(substituted off) 51' Allan Jacobsen	P	1	P	Kevin Tkachuk (substituted off) 67'
		Replacements
(substituted on) 64' Dougie Hall	H	16	P	Frank Walsh (substituted on) 67'
(substituted on) 51' Alasdair Dickinson	P	17	F	Jason Marshall (substituted on) 72'
(substituted on) 75' Matt Mustchin	L	18	L	Mike Burak (substituted on) 52'
(substituted on) 51' Scott Gray	F	19	N8	Sean-Michael Stephen (substituted on) 72'
(substituted on) 58' Rory Lawson	SH	20	SH	Morgan Williams (substituted on) 52'
(substituted on) 58' Dan Parks	FH	21	FH	Nathan Hirayama (substituted on) 47'
(substituted on) 64' Max Evans	W	22	C	Bryn Keys (substituted on) 61'
		Coaches
(Scotland) Frank Hadden				Kieran Crowley (New Zealand)
