= 2011 Canadian Rugby Championship =

- Countries: Canada
- Champions: Ontario Blues
- Runners-up: BC Bears
- Matches played: 10
- Tries scored: 67 (average 6.7 per match)
- Top point scorer: Dean Blanks (55)
- Top try scorer: Duncan Maguire (4)

The 2011 Canadian Rugby Championship was the 3rd season of the Canadian Rugby Championship. No Canada Selects team would be chosen because there was no ARC season that year, due to the Rugby World Cup being held the same year, in which Canada participated.

The Ontario Blues were the 2011 CRC champions, winning the MacTier Cup a game before the season ended, having enough points to win the championship without being affected by the last game of the season, which they won anyway. It was their first ever CRC Championship title.

Dean Blanks scored 55 points during the season, becoming the league's highest ever scorer, although it was the first year with more than six games a season. Duncan Maguire also set a record, scoring four tries, becoming the season's and the league's highest ever try scorer, but again this was in a season where each team played two more games than in previous years.

It was the first season where a player received an individual award—Player of the Year.

== Pre-season ==
The league again didn't schedule any formal pre-season games, so teams played exhibition games against other sides as preparation for the season.

=== Scores ===
Date	Home	Score	Away
May 13, 2011	Canada Selects	13-19	The Rock
May 14, 2011	James Bay AA	48-38	The Rock
May 19, 2011	The Rock	13-16	Salta Province
May 21, 2011	Ontario Blues	39-17	Salta Province

== Regular season ==
=== Structure ===
This season continued to utilize the round-robin format similar to The Rugby Championship where the team with the most points at the end of the season was named champion. However, the number of games in the season increased from six to 10, with each team playing five. The western teams played three home games and two away games, while this schedule was reversed for the eastern teams.

=== Standings ===
Place	Team	Games				Points			Bonus points		Table points
Place	Team	Played	Won	Lost	Drawn	For	Against	Difference	4 Tries	7 Point Loss	Table points
1	Ontario Blues	5	4	1	0	148	78	70	3	1	20
2	BC Bears	5	2	3	0	148	160	−12	3	1	12
2	Prairie Wolf Pack	5	2	3	0	103	123	−20	2	2	12
4	The Rock	5	2	3	0	105	143	−38	0	1	9

== Awards ==
This was the first season to award individual players. The only award given out was Player of the Year, determined by votes from the players' own coaches, all the other coaches, and a Rugby Canada representative. Two players tied for the votes: Josefa Dolesau of the BC Bears and Dean Blanks from The Rock.

== See also ==
- Canadian Rugby Championship
- Rugby Canada
