= England Counties XV =

England
- Union: Rugby Football Union
- Emblem(s): Red Rose
- Coach(es): Mark Luffman (Forwards coach)
- Captain(s): Keith Laughlin (Blaydon)
Team kit	Change kit

Largest win
- 108–10 v Korea President's XV (2009)

Largest defeat
- 27–57 v Scotland Club XV (2016)

England Counties XV is a representative rugby union team, formed in 2002, open to English players who play in the County Championship and the third tier (and below) of the English rugby union system. Players from the Premiership and RFU Championship are ineligible.

== 2019 matches ==
	Date	Opponent	Location	Result	Score	Reference
1	7 June	Georgia XV	Kutaisi	W	28 – 15	
2	11 June	Georgia XV	Avchala Rugby Stadium, Tbilisi	L	23 – 24	

== 2018 matches ==
	Date	Opponent	Location	Result	Score	Reference
1	1 June	CSM București		W	41 – 17	
2	5 June	Romania A		W	41 – 5	
3	8 June	Romania A		W	31 – 20	

== 2017 matches ==
	Date	Opponent	Location	Result	Score	Reference
1	24 February	Scotland Club XV	Billesley Common, Birmingham	W	45 – 28	
2	17 March	Ireland Club International	Temple Hill, Ballintemple, Cork	W	34 – 26	
3	31 May	Euskarians	San Sebastián	W	61 – 19	
4	3 June	Spain	Guadalajara	W	45 – 28	

== 2016 matches ==
	Date	Opponent	Location	Result	Score	Reference
1	26 February	Scotland Club XV	Netherdale, Galashiels	L	27 – 57	
2	11 March	France Federale XV	Rectory Field, Blackheath	W	32 – 3	
3	3 June	BC Bears	Klahanie Park, West Vancouver	W	41 – 0	
4	7 June	Prairie Wolf Pack	Rugby Park, Calgary	W	67 – 10	
5	11 June	Ontario Blues	Fletcher's Fields, Toronto	W	73 – 0	

== 2015 matches ==
	Date	Opponent	Location	Result	Score	Reference
1	27 February	Scotland Club XV	Woodlands Memorial Ground, Lytham St Annes	W	37 – 3	
2	20 March	France Federale XV	Stade Francis-Rongiéras, Périgueux	W	24 – 15	
3	5 June	CSM București	Stadionul Arcul de Triumf, Bucharest	W	28 – 16	
4	9 June	Romania A	Stadionul Arcul de Triumf, Bucharest	W	28 – 20	

The England Counties squad for the tour of Romania was:

Forwards: Matthew Beesley (Wharefdale & Cheshire), David Laverick (Hull Ionians & Yorkshire), Stephen Johnson (Hull Ionians & Yorkshire), Craig Williams (Redruth & Cornwall), Andrew Berry (Old Albanians & Hertfordshire), Brett McNamee (Old Albanians & Hertfordshire), Samuel Wilkes (Cinderford & Gloucestershire), Ben Hilton (Launceston & Cornwall), Christopher Wearmouth (Blaydon& Durham), George Oram (Blackheath & Kent), Keith Laughlin (Blaydon & Northumberland), Gavin Jones (Blaydon & Yorkshire), Evan Stewart (Fylde & Lancashire), Harry Bate (Blaydon & Northumberland), Nyle Davidson (Caldy & Cheshire).

Backs: William Crow (Dorking & Surrey), Matthew Shepherd (Launceston & Cornwall), Alexander Gallagher (Blackheath & Kent), Sebastian Rodwell (London Irish Wild Geese & Gloucestershire), James Spiers (Old Albanians & Hertfordshire), Samuel Winter (Bishop Stortford & Hertfordshire), Leo Fielding (Cinderford & Gloucestershire), Albert Portsmouth (Cambridge & Eastern Counties), Nevaro Codlin (Coney Hill & Gloucestershire), Jordan Dorrington (Fylde & Lancashire), Henry Robinson (Darlington Mowden Park & Hertfordshire), Michael Wilcox (Cinderford & Gloucestershire).

== 2014 matches ==
	Date	Opponent	Location	Result	Score	Reference
1	31 January	France Federale XV	Nevers	L	15 – 16	
2	21 February	Ireland Club XV	Northern Echo Arena, Darlington	L	22 – 23	
3	4 June	Emerging Georgia	Tbilisi	W	48 – 23	
4	8 June	Emerging Georgia	Rustavi Stadium, Tbilisi	W	15 – 14	

== 2013 matches ==
The England Counties squad for the Belgium tour in June 2013 was:

Forwards: Harry Broadbent (Caldy & Cheshire) Royce Cadman (Hull Ionians & Yorkshire) Mark George* (Stourbridge & Gloucestershire) Matt Hall* (Blaydon & Northumberland) Michael Hill (Birmingham Bees and North Midlands) Ben Hilton* (Launceston & Cornwall) Steve Hipwell (Cambridge & Eastern Counties) Darren Jacques* (Redruth & Cornwall) Robbie Kalbraier* (Blaydon & Northumberland) Adam Kettle (Doncaster & Cheshire) James Lindfield (Blackheath & Kent) Brett McNamee (Old Albanian & Hertfordshire) Tom Stradwick* (Blackheath & Kent) Chris Wearmouth*(Blaydon & Durham)

Backs: Drew Cheshire (Luctonians & North Midlands) Nevaro Codlin (Cinderford & Gloucestershire) Chris Hallam (Doncaster & Yorkshire) Chris Harris (Tynedale & Northumberland) Matt Heeks* (Rosslyn Park & Eastern Counties) Chris Johnson* (Fylde & Lancashire) Rhys Owen (Loughborough & North Midlands) Heath Stevens (Plymouth & East Midlands) Sean Taylor (Preston & Lancashire) Ollie Thomas* (Moseley & North Midlands) Nielson Webber (Launceston & Cornwall) Jim Wigglesworth* (Cambridge & Yorkshire) *Capped by the England Counties

	Date	Opponent	Location	Result	Score	Reference
1	8 February	Ireland Club XV	Temple Hill, Cork	L	20 – 30	
2	22 February	France Federale	Trailfinders Sports Ground, Ealing	W	27 – 7	
3	12 June	Belgium President's Select	Kituro Rugby Club, Brussels	W	78 – 0	
4	16 June	Belgium	Stade Leburton, Tubize	W	57 – 5	

The England Counties squad for the February matches was: Forwards Dave Allen (Blackheath); Tom Fidler (Cambridge); Mark George (Stourbridge); Matt Hall (Blaydon); James Inglis (Esher); Billy Johnson (Old Albanian); Robbie Kalbraier (Blaydon); Alex Loney (Fylde); Sam Shires (Ealing Trailfinders); Ollie Stedman (Tynedale); Will Warden (Richmond); Ben West (Cinderford). Backs Jack Adams (Cinderford); Lewis Barker (Coventry); Scott Barrow (Fylde); Nev Edwards (Rosslyn Park); Chris Elder (Esher); Matt Heeks (Rosslyn Park); Peter Hodgkinson (Ealing Trailfinders); Will Hurrell (Stourbridge); Ollie Marchon (Old Albanian); Rory Teague (Blackheath).

== 2012 Tour of East Africa ==
The team toured East Africa in early June 2012. While there they played a match against the East Africa rugby union team which, though established in 1950 and having previously faced the British Lions (twice), the Springboks, Wales and the Barbarians, was playing its first fixture in almost exactly 30 years The tour was designed to aid this region re-ignite its rugby heritage.

2012 Matches

	Date	Opponent	Location	Result	Score	Reference
1	16 March	Ulster Bank International Team	Lightfoot Green, Preston	Won	34 – 16	
2	5 June	Ugandan Barbarians	Kampala	Won	66 – 13	
3	9 June	Elgon Warriors	Kampala	Won	39 – 5	
4	16 June	Elgon Warriors	Nairobi	Won	34 – 14	

The England Counties squad was: Forwards Rob Baldwin (Wharfedale & Yorkshire) Joe Bonner*^ (Blackheath & Kent) Richard Boyle^ (Newcastle Falcons & Northumberland) James Cleverly (Blackheath & Kent) David Dickinson* (Tynedale & Northumberland) Billy Johnson (Unattached & Hertfordshire) James Lindfield (Westcombe Park & Kent) Dave Marwick (Stockport & Cheshire) Louis McGowan*^ (Sedgley Park & Lancashire) Ben Pons (Moseley & North Mids) Gareth Rawlings (Fylde & Lancashire) Jared Saunders (Saracens & Hertfordshire) Craig Voisey^ (Moseley & North Mids) Sam Wilkes* (Cinderford & Gloucestershire) Backs Chris Briers*^ (Fylde & Lancashire) Will Burton (Luctonians & North Mids) Phil Chesters* (Ealing & Devon) Steve Hamilton^ (Unattached & Yorkshire) Peter Hodgkinson*^ (Ealing & Cheshire) Toby Howley-Berridge (Unattached & Eastern Counties) Stefan Liebenberg* (Bedford & Hertfordshire) Harry Peck*^ (Tynedale & Northumberland) Jack Smales^ (Nevers & Northumberland) Rory Teague (Cinderford & Gloucestershire) Tom Wheatcroft* (Ealing & Warwickshire) Jim Wigglesworth (Hull & Yorkshire) Players on standby Rob Schillachi^ (Hertford & Hertfordshire); Jamie Salter (Launceston & Cornwall); Chris Wearmouth* (Blaydon & Durham); Gavin Jones (Blaydon & Yorkshire); Philip Woodhead* (Wharfedale & Yorkshire); Tyson Lewis (Plymouth & Devon)

- Key * Represented England Counties in Spring Internationals ^ Represented England Counties on previous Tour

== 2011 Tour of Spain ==
	Date	Opponent	Location	Result	Score
Match 1	5 June	Madrid XV	Madrid	Won	53 – 24
Match 2	8 June	Castilla Leon Union XV	Salamanca	Won	104 – 10
Match 3	11 June	Spain	Estadio Pepe Rojo, Valladolid	Won	55 – 6

The England Counties squad was: Forwards: Rob Baldwin (Wharfedale & Yorkshire), Daegan Beaumont (Worthing & Sussex), Richard Boyle (Tynedale & Northumberland), Matt Hall (Blaydon & Northumberland), Ben Hilton (Launceston & Cornwall), Martin Kent (Macclesfield & Cheshire), Aaron Myers (Westoe & Durham), Steve Pape (Rosslyn Park & Somerset), Jack Preece (Birmingham Solihull & Gloucestershire), Rob Schillaci (Hertford & Hertfordshire), Ben Sparks (Stourbridge & Gloucestershire), Tom Stradwick (Henley & Kent), Tommy Taylor (Sale Jets & Cheshire), Craig Voisey (Moseley & North Midlands), Gavin Woods ( Caldy & Cheshire). Backs: Oliver Brennand (Fylde & Lancashire), Gareth Collins (Leicester Lions & Warwickshire) (Captain), Steve Hamilton (Rotherham & Kent), Peter Hodgkinson (Ealing & Cheshire), Tom Hughes (Preston Grasshoppers & Lancashire), Cameron Mitchell (Plymouth Albion & North Midlands), Charlie Mulchrone (Macclesfield & Cheshire), Fergus Mulchrone (unattached & Cheshire), Harry Peck (Tynedale & Northumberland), Aaron Penberthy (Redruth & Cornwall), Ollie Thomas (Moseley & North Midlands), Curtis Wilson (Leeds & Yorkshire).

England Counties have met the Spanish national side once previously. Both took part in a FIRA Festival in southwestern France in 2007, when the Counties were 21–15 winners in Morlaàs.

== 2010 Tour of Canada ==
	Date	Opponent	Location	Result	Score
Match 1	4 June	The Rock	Swilers RFC, St John's, Newfoundland	Won	20 – 6
Match 2	8 June	Ontario Blues	Crusader Park, Oakville, Toronto	Won	32 – 26
Match 3	16 June	British Columbia Bears	Klahanie Park, West Vancouver	Won	46 – 7

== 2009 Tour of Korea and Japan ==
	Date	Opponent	Location	Result	Score
Match 1	5 June	Korea President's XV	Seongnam Stadium, Seoul	Won	108 – 10
Match 2	8 June	East Japan	Edogawa Stadium, Tokyo	Won	67 – 31
Match 3	12 June	Yamaha Jubilo	Yamaha Resort, Tsumagoi	Won	36 – 20

== 2008 FIRA/AER Rugby Festival in France ==
	Date	Opponent	Location	Result	Score
Match 1	7 September	Russia	Stade Marius Lacoste, Fleurance	Won	76 - 10
Match 2	11 September	Spain	Stade des Cordeliers, Morlaas	Won	21 – 15
Match 3	13 September	France Amateurs	Stade Municipal, Saint-Paul-lès-Dax	Drew	21 – 21

== 2008 Tour of USA and Canada ==
	Date	Opponent	Location	Result	Score
Match 1	6 June	USA Eagles A	New York	Won	26 – 3
Match 2	9 June	USA Eagles A	New York	Won	31 – 16
Match 3	12 June	Canada Select XV	Community Athletic Complex, Chatham-Kent	Won	31 - 6

== 2007 tour of Russia ==
	Date	Opponent	Location	Result	Score
Match 1	7 June	Rugby team of Krasnoyarsk	Central Stadium	Won	27 – 19
Match 2	12 June	VVA-Podmoskovie	Monino Stadium	Won	15 – 35
Match 3	16 June	Russia	Slava Stadium, Moscow	Won	23 – 21

The England Counties squad was Forwards: Neil Spence (Yorkshire & Bradford & Bingley), Chris Rainbow (Hertfordshire & Newbury), Mike Blakeburn (Surrey & Esher), Chris Morgan ( Somerset & Newbury), Gregor Hayter ( Oxfordshire & Newbury), James Winterbottom (Middlesex & Henley), David Campton (Warwickshire & Coventry), Alex Davidson (North Midlands & Pertemps Bees), James Tideswell (North Midlands & Stourbridge), Carl Rimmer (Warwickshire & Coventry), Tim Mathias (Devon & Plymouth Albion), Liam Wordley (Staffordshire & Henley), Glenn Cooper (Somerset & Newbury), Duncan Cormack (Surrey & Esher) captain. Backs: Oliver Viney (Lancashire & Preston Grasshoppers), Frankie Neale (Kent & Blackheath), Tom Jarvis (Gloucestershire & Lydney), Hamish Smales (Northumberland & Tynedale), Chris Malherbe (Yorkshire & Wharfedale), Aaran Cruickshank (Devon & Plymouth Albion), Mark Bedworth (Yorkshire & Wharfedale), Scott Rawlings (Staffordshire & Manchester), Mark Woodrow (Gloucestershire & Doncaster), Matthew Leek (Surrey & Esher), Paul Knight (Gloucestershire & Moseley), Chris Pilgrim (Cheshire & Loughborough University).

== England Counties under-20 ==
	Date	Opponent	Location	Result	Score	Reference
Match 1	6 May 2011	Scotland under-20	West Park, Leeds	Lost	15 – 18	
Match 2	4 May 2012	Scotland under-20	University Park, St Andrews University	Lost	16 – 33	Report
Match 3	15 May 2013	Georgia under-20 Select XV	Shevardeni High Performance Centre, Tbilisi	Won	16 – 14	Report
Match 4	18 May 2013	Georgia under-20	Shevardeni High Performance Centre, Tbilisi	Won	25 – 13	
Match 5	24 May 2014	Georgia under-20	Volac Park, Cambridge	Lost	22 – 23	
Match 6	12 June 2015	Hungarian Barbarians	RCH Stadium, Esztergom	Won	94 – 24	
Match 7	14 June 2015	Hungary under-20				
Match 8	5 June 2016	Russia under-20	Slavia Stadium, Moscow	Won	19 – 14	
Match 9	8 June 2016	Russia under-20	Slavia Stadium, Moscow	Lost	29 – 32	
Match 10	7 June 2017	Holland A	National Rugby Centre, Amsterdam	Won	36 – 8	
Match 11	10 June 2017	Holland A	Rugby Club Waterland, Purmerend	Won	57 – 8	
Match 12	19 May 2018	Georgia under-20	Tbilisi	Won	24 – 17	
Match 13	25 May 2018	Georgia under-20 Development XV	Rustavi	Won	24 – 22	

== England Counties under-18 ==
Date	Opponent	Location	Result	Score	Ref
30 March 2016	France under-18 Poles Espoirs	Ashbourne RFC, County Meath	L		
2 April 2016	Ireland under-18 Clubs	Ashbourne RFC, County Meath	L		
12 April 2017	Ireland under-18 Clubs & Schools	Ashbourne RFC, County Meath	L	17 – 29	
15 April 2017	Ireland under-18 Clubs & Schools	Ashbourne RFC, County Meath	L	13 − 24	
4 April 2018	Ireland Clubs and Schools U18	United Services, Portsmouth	W	15 – 13	
7 April 2018	Ireland Clubs and Schools U18	United Services, Portsmouth			
