= Kainoa Lloyd =

Canada international rugby union player

- Born: May 21, 1994 (age 32) Mississauga, Ontario
- Height: 5 ft 9 in (1.75 m)
- Weight: 205 lb (93 kg; 14 st 9 lb)
- School: Streetsville High School
- University: Queen's University

Rugby union career
- Position(s): Winger, Centre
Senior career
Years	Team	Apps	(Points)
2019	Toronto Arrows	9	(15)
2022	San Diego Legion	5	(5)
2023–	Houston SaberCats	1	(5)
- Correct as of 14 Feb 2026
Provincial / State sides
Years	Team	Apps	(Points)
2016–present	Ontario Blues		
2020–present	BC Bears 7s	2	
International career
Years	Team	Apps	(Points)
2017–	Canada Selects		
2017–2024	Canada	25	(50)
2025–	Canada 7s		(15)

Kainoa Lloyd (born 21 May 1994) is a Canadian rugby union player who plays as a winger for the Houston SaberCats in Major League Rugby (MLR). He also plays for the Ontario Blues in the Canadian Rugby Championship and Canada internationally.

He previously played for the Toronto Arrows in the MLR.
