= Duncan Maguire =

Canada international rugby union player

- Born: January 2, 1989 (age 37)
- Height: 5 ft 11 in (180 cm)
- Weight: 190 lb (86 kg)
- School: St. Albert Catholic High School

Rugby union career
- Position: Winger
International career
Years	Team	Apps	(Points)
2016–	Canada	3	(5)

Duncan Maguire (born January 2, 1989) is a Canadian former international rugby union player.

A pacy winger, Maguire played his rugby for Alberta-based teams St. Albert RFC and Prairie Wolf Pack. He scored a competition leading six tries in five matches for Prairie Wolf Pack in the 2013 Canadian Rugby Championship.

Maguire made his earliest international appearances in rugby sevens, debuting for Canada during the 2013–14 IRB Sevens World Series. He earned a Canada XV call up for the 2016 Americas Rugby Championship, joining his former St. Albert Catholic High School teammates Kyle Gilmour and Jake Robinson in the national side. Capped three times during the tournament, Maguire scored a try in his debut match against the United States.

== See also ==
- List of Canada national rugby union players
