= Joe Dolesau =

Canada international rugby union player

- Full name: Josefa Dolesau
- Born: January 8, 1982 (age 44)
- Height: 5 ft 10 in (178 cm)
- Weight: 210 lb (95 kg)

Rugby union career
- Position: Centre
International career
Years	Team	Apps	(Points)
2016–	Canada	1	(0)

Josefa Dolesau (born January 8, 1982) is a Fijian-born Canadian former international rugby union player.

== Biography ==
Dolesau, a centre, hails from Sawani village and won a Farebrother-Sullivan Trophy during his time with Naitasiri in Fijian provincial rugby, before being signed by Burnaby Lake Rugby Club in his late 20s, which he went on to captain.

In 2011, Dolesau was named Canadian Rugby Championship co-Player of the Year for his performances with the BC Bears.

Dolesau earned his first Canada call up for the 2013 Americas Rugby Championship, as a member of the Canada "A" team. He was the 2013 British Columbia Men's Premier League player of the year, only the second Burnaby Lake player after Pat Riordan to receive the award.

In 2016, Dolesau made his full international debut for Canada in the Americas Rugby Championship, as a substitute against Brazil in Langford, British Columbia.

== See also ==
- List of Canada national rugby union players
