= Tony Healy =

Canada international rugby union player & coach

- Full name: Anthony Robert Arthur Healy
- Born: July 17, 1969 (age 57) Nanaimo, BC, Canada
- Height: 6 ft 6 in (198 cm)
- Weight: 252 lb (114 kg)
- University: University of Victoria
- Occupation: Educator

Rugby union career
- Position: Lock
International career
Years	Team	Apps	(Points)
1996–99	Canada	15	(0)

Anthony Robert Arthur Healy (born July 17, 1969) is a Canadian former rugby union player and coach.

== Biography ==
=== Playing career ===
Born in Nanaimo, British Columbia, Healy was a lock and played on the Canada national team from 1996 to 1999, gaining 15 caps for his country. He had several seasons of professional rugby in France playing with US Marmande, US Dax, FC Auch, Aviron Bayonnais and Bordeaux-Bègles, as well as a season in England at Moseley.

=== Rugby coach ===
Healy, formerly a teacher at Brentwood College School, coached the BC Bears to a Canadian Rugby Championship title in 2017 and was then appointed head coach of Major League Rugby's Seattle Seawolves, but visa difficulties meant he couldn't take up the position.

== See also ==
- List of Canada national rugby union players
