= Hubert Buydens =

Canada international rugby union player (born 1982)

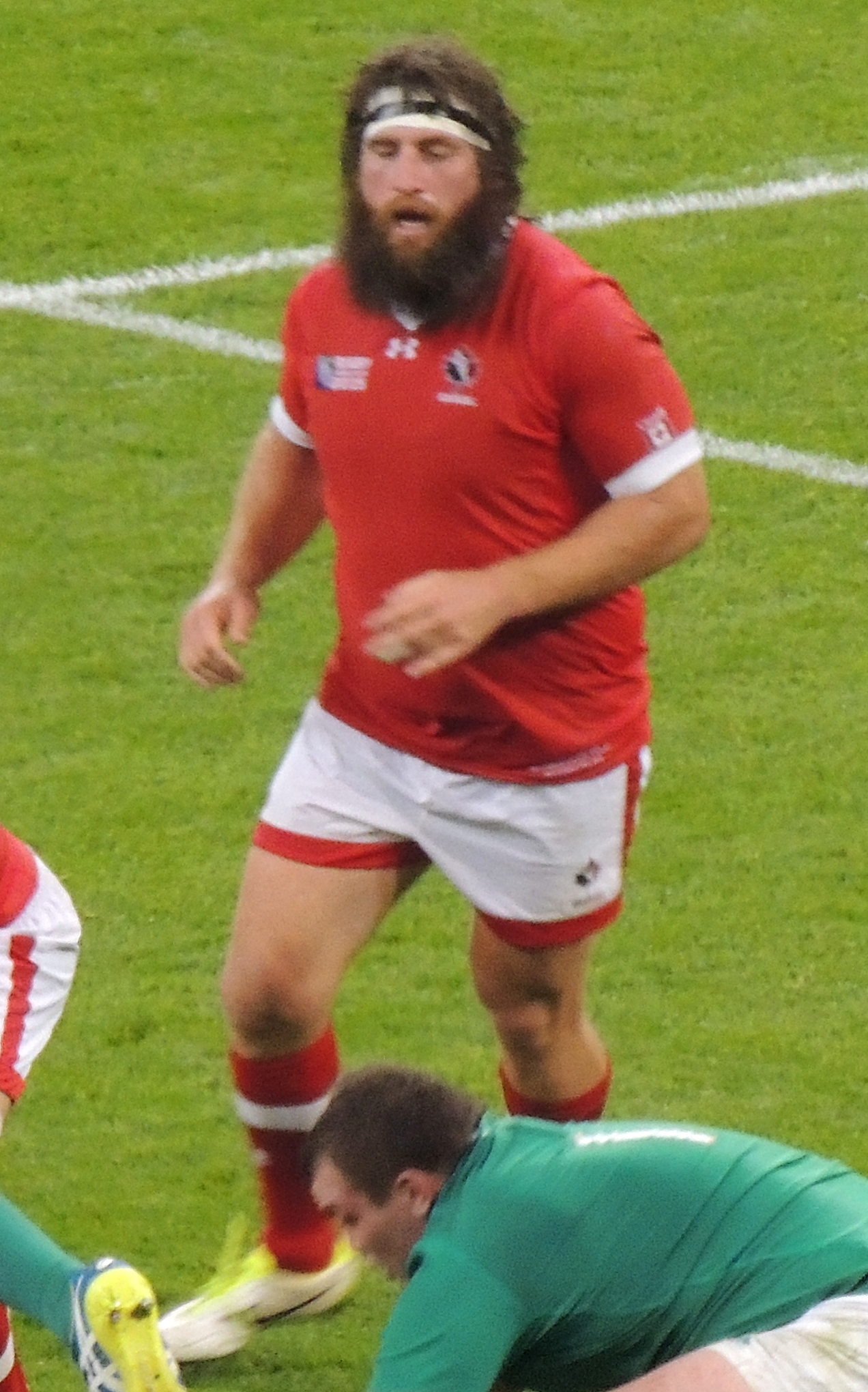
- Born: Hubert Buydens; 4 January 1982 (age 44) Saskatoon, Saskatchewan, Canada
- Height: 190 cm (6 ft 3 in)
- Weight: 118 kg (260 lb)
- University: University of Saskatchewan

Rugby union career
- Position: Prop
Amateur team(s)
Years	Team	Apps	(Points)
- Saskatoon Wild Oats RFC
–	Castaway Wanderers RFC		
Senior career
Years	Team	Apps	(Points)
- Prairie Wolf Pack
2016	San Diego Breakers	6	(5)
2018–	New Orleans Gold	23	(10)
- Correct as of 9 September 2019
Provincial / State sides
Years	Team	Apps	(Points)
2013–15	Manawatu	16	(0)
- Correct as of 15 August 2018
International career
Years	Team	Apps	(Points)
2006–	Canada	55	(0)
- Correct as of 9 September 2019

Hubert Buydens (born 4 January 1982) is a Canadian rugby union player. He is a member of the Canada national side and was part of Canada's squad at the 2011 Rugby World Cup where he made 4 appearances. He plays as a prop forward and made his Canada debut in 2006 against England Saxons and currently holds 50 caps in total.

Born in Saskatoon, Saskatchewan, Canada, Buydens previously played his club rugby with the Castaway Wanderers RFC in the British Columbia Premiership and with the Prairie Wolf Pack in the Canadian Rugby Championship. He also played Canadian football at the University of Saskatchewan and was drafted by the BC Lions in the sixth round of 2008 CFL draft; he attended training camp with the Lions but chose not to play Canadian football professionally.

Buydens currently plays for the New Orleans Gold in Major League Rugby.
