= Djustice Sears-Duru =

Canadian rugby union player

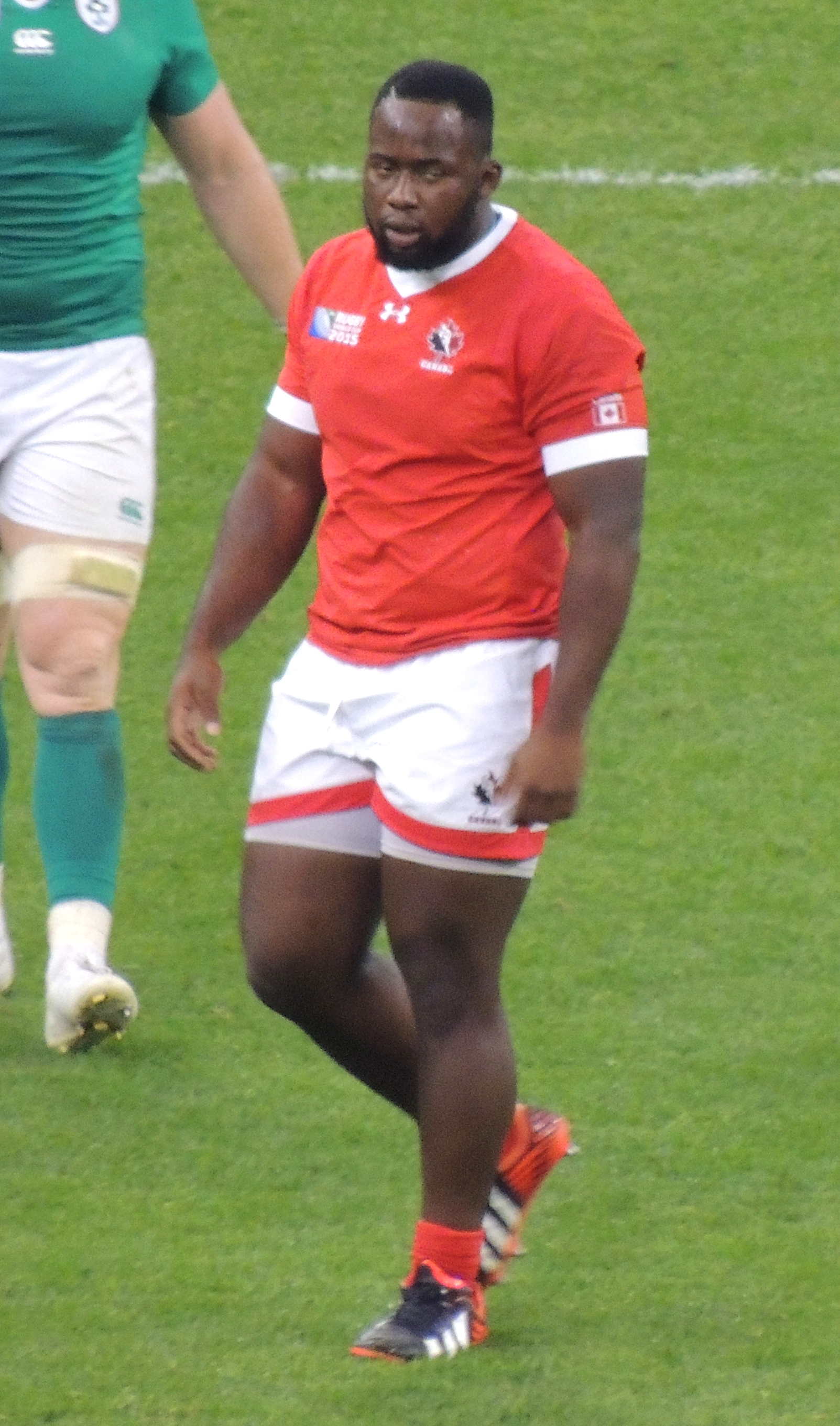
- Sears-Duru playing for Canada in the 2015 Rugby World Cup
- Born: 24 May 1994 (age 32) Edmonton, Alberta, Canada
- Height: 1.85 m (6 ft 1 in)
- Weight: 119 kg (262 lb)

Rugby union career
- Position: Prop
Amateur team(s)
| Years | Team | Apps | (Points) |
- Castaway Wanderers
- Oakville Crusaders
| 2016–17 | Ayr | | |
Senior career
| Years | Team | Apps | (Points) |
| 2014 | North Otago | 4 | (0) |
| 2016–17 | Glasgow Warriors | 4 | (0) |
| 2017–18 | Ealing Trailfinders | 6 | (0) |
| 2018 | Ontario Arrows | 1 | (0) |
| 2019–2021 | Seattle Seawolves | 25 | (5) |
| 2022 | LA Giltinis | | |
| 2023– | San Diego Legion | | |
- Correct as of 19 March 2023
Provincial / State sides
| Years | Team | Apps | (Points) |
- Ontario Blues
International career
| Years | Team | Apps | (Points) |
| 2013–14 | Canada U20 | 8 | (5) |
| 2014– | Canada | 67 | (15) |
- Correct as of 20 November 2023

Djustice Sears-Duru (born 24 May 1994) is a Canada international rugby union prop who plays for Ealing Trailfinders and the San Diego Legion of Major League Rugby (MLR).

He previously played for the Seattle Seawolves and the LA Giltinis in the MLR.

He formerly played for Glasgow Warriors and Ontario Blues.

== Rugby Union career ==
=== Amateur career ===
Sears-Duru has appeared for the Castaway Wanderers rugby club in the British Columbia Premier League. Sears-Duru played as a minor, junior and senior for the Crusaders Rugby Club in Oakville, Ontario.

Upon moving to Scotland to play for the Warriors, Sears-Duru has made some appearances for Ayr in the Scottish Premiership.

=== Professional career ===
Sears-Duru played for Ontario Blues.

He joined Glasgow Warriors on a short-term deal till the end of the 2015–16 season on 23 March 2016. This was then extended till the end of the 2016–17 season.

Sears-Duru made his debut for the Warriors in the pre-season match against Harlequins on 20 August 2016.

On 20 February 2017 it was announced that Sears-Duru would leave the Warriors at the end of the season.

Sears-Duru rejoined Ontario Blues before joining Ealing Trailfinders for the 2017–18 season.

=== Club statistics ===
As of 9 February 2022

| Season | Team | Games | Starts | Sub | Tries | Cons | Pens | Drops | Points | Yel | Red |
|---|---|---|---|---|---|---|---|---|---|---|---|
| MLR 2019 | Seattle Seawolves | 10 | 7 | 3 | 1 | 0 | 0 | 0 | 5 | 0 | 0 |
| MLR 2020 | Seattle Seawolves | 5 | 5 | 0 | 0 | 0 | 0 | 0 | 0 | 0 | 0 |
| MLR 2021 | Seattle Seawolves | 4 | 4 | 0 | 0 | 0 | 0 | 0 | 0 | 1 | 0 |
| MLR 2022 | LA Giltinis | 1 | 1 | 0 | 0 | 0 | 0 | 0 | 0 | 0 | 0 |
| Total | | 20 | 17 | 3 | 1 | 0 | 0 | 0 | 5 | 1 | 0 |

=== International career ===
Sears-Duru made his debut for Canada in 2013 and was part of the Canada squad at the 2015 Rugby World Cup.
