= Clayton Panga =

Canada international rugby union player

- Born: July 6, 1985 (age 41) Calgary, Alberta, Canada
- Height: 6 ft 1 in (1.85 m)
- Weight: 213 lb (97 kg; 15 st 3 lb)

Rugby union career
- Position(s): Flanker, No8
Provincial / State sides
Years	Team	Apps	(Points)
2011-present	Prairie Wolf Pack		
International career
Years	Team	Apps	(Points)
2016	Canada	6	(10)

Clayton Panga (born 6 July 1985) is a Canadian rugby union player who plays as a flanker for the Prairie Wolf Pack in the Canadian Rugby Championship and previously Canada internationally.
