= Saskatoon Wild Oats RFC =

Canadian rugby union club, based in Saskatoon

Saskatoon Wild Oats R.F.C
- Full name: Saskatoon Wild Oats Rugby Football Club
- Union: North Saskatchewan Rugby Union
- Founded: 1973; 53 years ago
- Location: Saskatoon, Saskatchewan
- Ground: Saskatoon Rugby Pitches
- Coach: Brennan Marcoux
- Captain: Taylor Mui
- League: Saskatchewan Rugby Union
- 2016: Saskatchewan Provincial Champions

Official website
- www.saskatoonwildoats.ca

The Saskatoon Wild Oats RFC is a Canadian rugby club based in Saskatoon, Saskatchewan. The Wild Oats Rugby Club was founded in 1973. The club has won multiple provincial titles in the Saskatchewan Rugby Union. The Wild Oats Rugby Club also has a successful women's team.

== Notable players ==
=== Canada ===
The following players have represented Canada at full international level.

- Hubert Buydens
- Nanyak Dala
- Kayla Mack
