= Neil Spence (rugby union) =

English rugby union player

- Full name: Neil Andrew Spence
- Born: 30 August 1976 (age 50) Hull, England
- Height: 1.81 m (5 ft 11 in)
- Weight: 95 kg (14 st 13 lb; 209 lb)

Rugby union career
- Position: Flanker
Youth career
- Hymers College
- –: Leicester Tigers
Senior career
Years	Team	Apps	(Points)
1995-1996	Gloucester		
1996-2004	Rotherham Titans	159	(85)
2004-2005	Saint Nazaire Ovalie		
2005-2009	Bradford & Bingley RFC	97	(85)
→2009	Harrogate RUFC	7	(15)
2009-2010	Hull RUFC	17	(25)
2010-2011	Rotherham Titans	1	(0)
→2010	Otley RUFC	5	(0)
2011-2012	Ilkley Rugby Club		
- Correct as of 24 April 2023
International career
Years	Team	Apps	(Points)
1994	England u18		
1996	England u21		
2001	National Division XV	1	(0)
2006-2008	Yorkshire Counties		
2007	England Counties XV	4	(0)
- Correct as of 24 April 2023
Coaching career
- Years: Team
- 2012-2014: Ilkley Rugby Club Forwards Coach
- 2014-2016: Old Crossleyans Head Coach
- 2016–2017: Halifax RUFC Head Coach
- 2017-2023: Bradford Salem Head Coach
- 2024-present: Skipton RFC Head Coach

Neil Andrew Spence (born 30 August 1976) is a former professional rugby union player who played at Gloucester, Leicester Tigers and Rotherham Titans in the English top division. He also represented the England age grade sides and numerous counties side. He is currently the Head Coach at Skipton RFC in Counties 3 Yorkshire.

== Career ==
=== Playing ===
Spence began his career at Hymers College before moving to Leicester Tigers then Gloucester.

He made his name at Rotherham Titans playing over 150 games for the side in 8 years, he made his debut on the 7th September 1996 against Blackheath in National Two starting at openside flanker.

In 2004 he moved to Saint Nazaire Ovalie in France for a season long stint before moving back to England to play for Bradford & Bingley, he stayed at Bradford & Bingley 4 seasons as a player/coach. During the 2008/09 season he spent time on loan to Harrogate RUFC where he made 17 appearances. At the end of the season he moved back to his home town to play for Hull RUFC. His stay only lasted a year as he moved back to play for Rotherham Titans for the 2010/11 season however he only made one appearance spending the majority of the time on loan to Otley RUFC. In 2011 he joined Ilkley RUFC for his final season playing.

=== Coaching ===
After a season at Ilkley RUFC he transitioned in to the Forwards coach, where he held the position for 2 years.

In 2014, Spence joined Old Crossaleyans RUFC as Head coach where he stayed for two seasons before moving on to become head coach at fellow Halifax side and ex-National League side who were now in Yorkshire 3, Halifax RUFC. In 2017 he left to join Bradford Salem as Head Coach where he stayed for 6 years before being released at the end of the 2022/23 season.

== International career ==
Spence was named part of the 1994 England u18 where he won the u18 Six Nations, scoring against Ireland in the finale. He also featured for the England u21s side.

During 2006 to 2008 he played for the Yorkshire Counties side winning the Bill Beaumont Cup in 2008.

In 2001 Spence was named in a National Division XV team to take on Eddie Jones' touring Wallabies side. The National Division side put up a good fight but in the end Australia won the match 22–34.

Spence made his debut for the England Counties XV against Ireland Club XV in February 2007, losing the match 20–17. In the same year he was named as part of the England Counties side to tour Russia, he made an appearance in all three of the tour matches, starting in the loss against VVA Podmoskovye and appearing off the bench in the wins against Krasny Yar Krasnoyarsk and the Russia national team.

== Lawsuit ==
In 2020, Spence joined many other former players in legal action against rugby union's governing bodies, accusing them of negligence over head injuries. He began noticing symptoms in 2012 before going to see a GP and then a neurologist, where he was diagnosed with early on-set dementia and has clinical evidence of CTE.
