= Mike Scholz =

Canadian rugby union player

- Born: Michael Scholz; 6 August 1988 (age 38) London, Ontario
- Height: 186 cm (6 ft 1 in)
- Weight: 99 kg (15 st 8 lb; 218 lb)

Rugby union career
- Position: Centre
International career
Years	Team	Apps	(Points)
2009-	Canada	6	(0)
National sevens team
Years	Team		Comps
2010-	Canada 7s		

Mike Scholz (born August 6, 1988 in London, Ontario) is a Canadian international rugby union player who plays as a centre. He was a member of the Canadian squad at the 2011 Rugby World Cup.
