= Nanyak Dala =

Canada international rugby union player

- Born: Nanyak Dala; 18 June 1984 (age 42) Jos, Nigeria
- Height: 178 cm (5 ft 10 in)
- Weight: 100 kg (220 lb)
- University: University of Saskatchewan

Rugby union career
- Position: Flanker
Amateur team(s)
Years	Team	Apps	(Points)
- Saskatoon Wild Oats RFC
–	Castaway Wanderers RFC		
Senior career
Years	Team	Apps	(Points)
- Prairie Wolf Pack
International career
Years	Team	Apps	(Points)
2007-	Canada	37	(20)
National sevens team
Years	Team		Comps
- Canada
Medal record
Men's rugby sevens
Representing Canada
Pan American Games
Gold medal – first place	2011 Guadalajara	Team competition

Nanyak Dala (born 18 June 1984) is a Canadian rugby union player. His position is flanker, and he has played 14 tests for the Canadian national team. Dala currently plays for Castaway Wanderers RFC in the British Columbia Premiership and with Prairie Wolf Pack in the Canadian Rugby Championship.

== Personal life ==
Dala was born in Jos, Nigeria, but moved to South Africa with his family and took up rugby at age 12. Eventually Dala would go on to represent KwaZulu-Natal provincial teams at various age-grade levels. Dala and his family would eventually move on to the city of North Battleford in Canada where his father, Gideon, sought job opportunities in the medical field. Dala later moved on to Saskatoon to pursue university education at the University of Saskatchewan. In Saskatoon Dala would go on to join local club side, Saskatoon Wild Oats RFC.
