= Aidan McMullan =

Canadian rugby union player

- Born: 16 March 1997 (age 29) Pointe-Claire, Quebec
- Height: 6 ft 3 in (1.91 m)
- Weight: 194 lb (88 kg)
- School: Lindsay Place High School
- University: John Abbott College; University of Victoria

Rugby union career
- Position: Winger
Youth career
- -2017: Sainte-Anne-De-Bellevue
Amateur team(s)
Years	Team	Apps	(Points)
2017-2019	Sainte-Anne-De-Bellevue		
Senior career
Years	Team	Apps	(Points)
2019-	Austin Elite		
Provincial / State sides
Years	Team	Apps	(Points)
2018-	The Rock		
International career
Years	Team	Apps	(Points)
2017	Canada u20s		
2018-	Canada Selects		
2018-	Canada		

Aidan McMullan (born 16 March 1997) is a Canadian professional rugby union player. He plays as a wing for the Austin Elite in Major League Rugby.
