= Connor Braid =

Canadian rugby union player (born 1990)

- Born: Connor Jackson Braid; May 31, 1990 (age 36) Victoria, British Columbia, Canada
- Height: 1.82 m (6 ft 0 in)
- Weight: 98.4 kg (217 lb)
- School: Oak Bay High School
- University: Royal Roads University

Rugby union career
- Position: Centre / Fly-half
Amateur team(s)
Years	Team	Apps	(Points)
- James Bay AA
Senior career
Years	Team	Apps	(Points)
- BC Bears
2012–2013	Doncaster Knights	12	(5)
2014–2015	Glasgow Warriors	6	(11)
2014–2015	→ London Scottish	7	(10)
2016–2017	Worcester Warriors	5	(27)
- Correct as of 21 January 2021
International career
Years	Team	Apps	(Points)
2009–2010	Canada U20	7	(40)
2010–2018	Canada	26	(43)
- Correct as of 27 January 2018
National sevens team
Years	Team		Comps
2011–	Canada		37
- Correct as of 21 January 2021
Medal record
Men's rugby sevens
Representing Canada
World Games
Bronze medal – third place	2013 Cali	Team competition

Connor Jackson Braid (born May 31, 1990) is a Canadian rugby union player. Braid is capable of playing at fly-half, in the centres or in the back three for XVs. In VIIs Braid's preferred position is at prop.

== Career ==
At the start of the 2014–15 season Braid signed an initial 3-month contract with Glasgow Warriors. This contract was extended although he was sent to London Scottish in December 2014 on loan with an agreement that he could return for cover during the 2015 Six Nations tournament. However, at the end of the Six Nations Glasgow Warriors announced that Braid would stay with the Pro 12 club until the end of the season.

Braid is now playing professionally with Canada 7s.

In June 2021, Braid was named to Canada's 2020 Summer Olympics team.
