= Mozac Samson =

Canada international rugby union player

- Born: 1 September 1985 (age 41) Fiji
- Height: 6 ft 2 in (1.88 m)
- Weight: 225 lb (102 kg)

Rugby union career
- Position(s): Centre, Winger
Amateur team(s)
| Years | Team | Apps | (Points) |
| 2005-2018,2019- | Calgary Saints | | |
Senior career
| Years | Team | Apps | (Points) |
| 2018 | Seattle Seawolves | 6 | (5) |
Provincial / State sides
| Years | Team | Apps | (Points) |
| 2009- | Prairie Wolf Pack | | |
International career
| Years | Team | Apps | (Points) |
| 2016 | Canada | 4 | (0) |

Mozac Samson (born 1 September 1986) is a Fijian born Canadian professional rugby union player. He plays as a centre for the Seattle Seawolves in Major League Rugby previously playing for Canada internationally. Mozac has been a KidSport Calgary ambassador since 2016.
