= Jordan Wilson-Ross =

Canada international rugby union player (born 1989)

- Full name: Jordan Timothy Wilson-Ross
- Born: January 17, 1989 (age 37)
- Height: 5 ft 9 in (175 cm)
- Weight: 194 lb (88 kg)
- School: Banting Memorial High School
- University: University of Ottawa

Rugby union career
- Position: Utility back
International career
Years	Team	Apps	(Points)
2014–16	Canada	4	(5)
Medal record
Men's rugby sevens
Representing Canada
World Games
Bronze medal – third place	2013 Cali	Team competition

Jordan Timothy Wilson-Ross (born January 17, 1989) is a Canadian football and rugby union player.

A native of Alliston, Ontario, Wilson-Ross attended Banting Memorial High School. He grew up playing Canadian football and in his senior year was a running back on his school's OFSAA title winning side, before continuing to play the sport during his time at the University of Ottawa, where he was an OUA second team All-Star in 2009.

Wilson-Ross, an Ontario Blues back, represented Canada in under-age rugby and earned a Canada "A" call up for the 2012 Americas Rugby Championship. In 2014, Wilson-Ross made his Test debut for Canada as a winger against Namibia in Colwyn Bay. He was capped a further three times off the bench and scored a try in his final outing against Russia.

In 2016, Wilson-Ross made a return to football, signed by the Saskatchewan Roughriders to their practice roster.

== See also ==
- List of Canada national rugby union players
