= Jeremy Kyne =

Canadian rugby union player

Jeremy Kyne (born May 2, 1983) is a Canadian international rugby union player who plays as a flanker. He was a member of the Canadian squad at the 2011 Rugby World Cup.
