= Frank Walsh (rugby union) =

Canada international rugby union player

- Born: September 5, 1976 (age 50) St John's, Canada
- Height: 1.8 m (5 ft 11 in)
- Weight: 109 kg (240 lb; 17.2 st)

Rugby union career
- Position: Prop
Senior career
Years	Team	Apps	(Points)
2013-	The Rock		
International career
Years	Team	Apps	(Points)
2008-2011	Canada	4	(0)

Frank Walsh (born September 5, 1976, in St John's) is a Canadian rugby union prop. He debuted for Canada against Ireland in 2008. Walsh was a member of the Canadian 2011 Rugby World Cup squad.
