= Patrick Parfrey =

Irish rugby union player

Patrick Joseph Parfrey OC ONL
- Born: 12 August 1950 (age 76); Cork, Ireland
- Education: University College Cork
- Awards: Canada Institute of Health Research Distinguished Scientist Award; Medal for Research Excellence (Kidney Foundation of Canada); Officer, Order of Canada
- Scientific career
- Fields: Nephrology & Clinical epidemiology
- Workplaces: Memorial University of Newfoundland

Patrick Parfrey, OC ONL (born 1950) is an Irish-Canadian physician, specialized as nephrologist and epidemiologist. Parfrey is an internationally known scientist and clinical epidemiologist. In addition, he has provided leadership to the sport of rugby union, coaching teams at the local (Swilers RFC), provincial (Newfoundland Rock) and national (Canada) levels and serving as president of Rugby Canada.

== Academics ==
Parfrey graduated from University College Cork in 1975 with a first-class honours degree in medicine. He was awarded an MB BCh in 1980.

After working in Cork, London and Montreal, Parfrey and his family eventually settled at Memorial University of Newfoundland. In 1984 he was appointed assistant professor of medicine. He became chief of the Division of Nephrology in 1987, chief of the division of Clinical Epidemiology and professor of medicine in 1993. His research interests include the genetic and clinical epidemiology of inherited diseases, patient-related problems in nephrology and healthcare delivery research. He has published over 200 original articles and contributed to many books.

Parfrey received the Canada Institute of Health Research Distinguished Scientist Award in 2000 and the Medal for Research Excellence from the Kidney Foundation of Canada in 2002. He was named an Officer to the Order of Canada in 2004. In October 2023 he was appointed a Member of the Order of Newfoundland and Labrador.

== Rugby union ==
Parfrey started playing rugby at age 13 at the CBC in his native Cork. He played his club rugby for University College Cork R.F.C., London Irish, Montreal Irish and Swilers RFC. Between 1970 and 1977 he played in all of Munster's games, including the game when Munster drew 3–3 with the New Zealand All-Blacks in 1973; he also won a cap for Ireland as a wing against them in 1974. He was the coach who led London Irish to the club's first ever Cup Final in 1980. He left London Irish in 1982 and moved to Montreal, where he coached the Montreal Irish. He then become coach of the Canadian National side and led them to the 1999 Rugby World Cup. He also led Canada to victory in the Pacific Rim Rugby Championship in 1997 and 1998. He later became the president of the Canadian RFU, and is still a director. More recently he coached the Newfoundland Rock team and won the Rugby Canada Super League.

His honours are Munster Cup with UCC (1976), County Championship with Middlesex, and Canadian National Championships 2005, 2006, and 2008 with the Newfoundland Rock as coach.

To improve Canadian Rugby Parfrey trained an under 19 team in 1987 and toured London. The team won 5 out of 6 games including the London Irish under 19 team.
