= Ciaran Hearn =

Canadian rugby union and sevens player

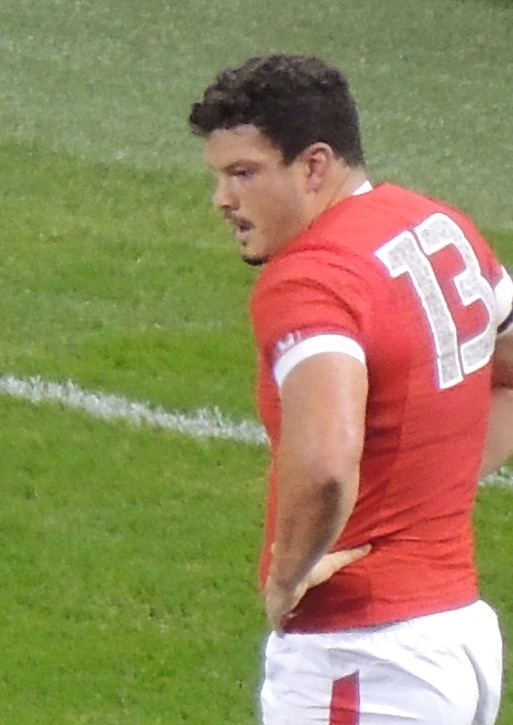
- Born: Ciaran Hearn; December 30, 1985 (age 40) Conception Bay South, Newfoundland, Canada
- Height: 1.90 m (6 ft 3 in)
- Weight: 100 kg (220 lb)

Rugby union career
- Position: Wing, Centre, Full Back
Amateur team(s)
Years	Team	Apps	(Points)
- Castaway Wanderers
–	Baymen Rugby Club		
Senior career
Years	Team	Apps	(Points)
2015–2019	London Irish	35	(30)
2020–2021	Old Glory DC	14	(5)
- Correct as of 10 November 2021
Provincial / State sides
Years	Team	Apps	(Points)
2012–	The Rock		
International career
Years	Team	Apps	(Points)
2008–2019	Canada	73	(63)
- Correct as of 18 July 2021
Medal record
Men's rugby sevens
Representing Canada
Pan American Games
Gold medal – first place	2011 Guadalajara	Team competition

Ciaran Hearn (born December 30, 1985) is a Canadian rugby union player who currently plays for Old Glory DC of Major League Rugby (MLR).

Hearn was part of the Canadian squad at the 2011 Rugby World Cup in New Zealand where he featured in two matches and in the second tier squad for the 2015 World Cup Team. He is also a member of the Canadian 7 A-side men's Teams

He made the move to professional rugby when he signed with then Aviva Premiership side London Irish on November 2, 2015. On 10 February 2016 he signed a contract extension which would see him stay at the English club until the end of the 2016-17 season.

In 2020, he signed with expansion team Old Glory DC in Major League Rugby, and re-signed for the 2021 season. At the end of the 2021 season, he announced that he was retiring from rugby.
