= Stu Ault =

Canada international rugby union player

- Full name: Stuart Ault
- Born: December 17, 1981 (age 44) Ontario, Canada
- Height: 6 ft 5 in (196 cm)
- Weight: 230 lb (104 kg)

Rugby union career
- Position: Lock
International career
Years	Team	Apps	(Points)
2006–09	Canada	7	(0)

Stuart Ault (born December 17, 1981) is a Canadian former international rugby union player.

A 6 ft 5 in lock from Perth, Ontario, Ault played rugby with Ottawa clubs Barrhaven Scottish and Harlequins, then the Castaway Wanderers after relocating west. He also had a stint in England playing for Birmingham & Solihull.

Ault was capped sevens times for Canada. He earned his first cap off the bench against Wales at Millennium Stadium in 2006 and played in Canada's win over the United States at the 2008 Churchill Cup.

== See also ==
- List of Canada national rugby union players
