= Starlight Stadium =

Multi-purpose stadium in Langford, British Columbia

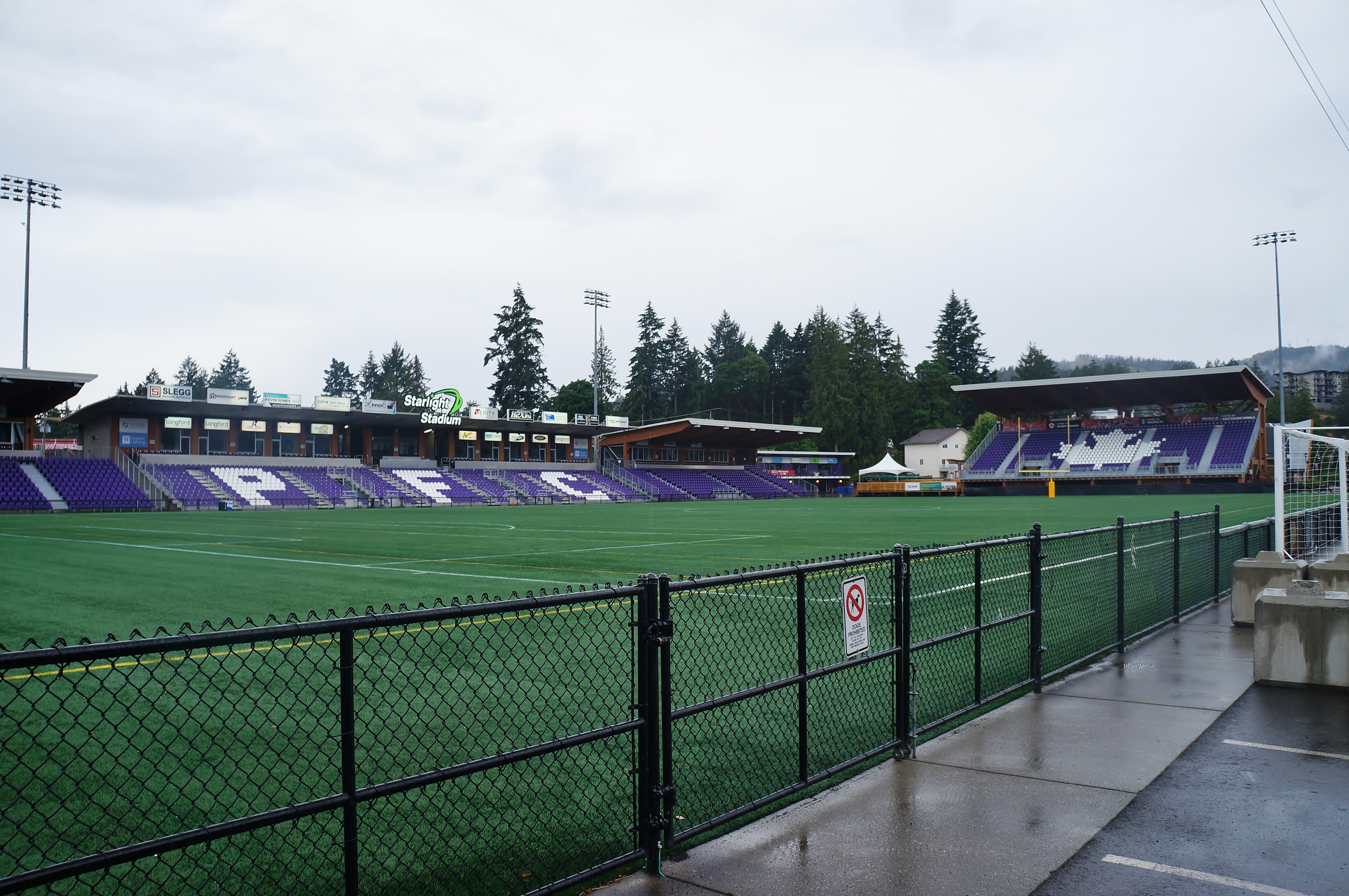
- Starlight Stadium in 2022
- Interactive map of Starlight Stadium
- Former names: Bear Mountain Stadium (2009–2012); Westhills Stadium (2012–2021)
- Address: 1089 Langford Pkwy, Victoria, BC V9B 0A5
- Coordinates: 48°26′35″N 123°31′25″W
- Elevation: 123 m (404 ft)
- Owner: City of Langford
- Operator: City of Langford
- Capacity: 6,000
- Executive suites: 18
- Surface: FieldTurf
- Record attendance: 6,126 (BC Lions vs Edmonton Elks, May 23, 2026)
- Public transit: BC Transit routes 39, 46, 58, 65
- Parking: Parking at Langford City Centre Park

Construction
- Opened: 2009
- Expanded: 2019
- Cost: CA$3 million

Tenants
- Rugby Canada 2009–present Westshore Rebels (CJFL) 2009–present Pacific FC (CPL) 2019–present BC Bears (CRC) 2009–2013; Victoria Highlanders (PDL) 2009–2011; BC Lions (CFL) 2025–present (Note: Preseason games only.)

Website
- Starlight Stadium at Langford.ca

Starlight Stadium (formerly Westhills Stadium) is a 6,000-seat multi-purpose stadium in Langford, British Columbia, Canada. It is used by Pacific FC of the Canadian Premier League for soccer, by Rugby Canada for various events, and by the Westshore Rebels junior Canadian football team. In an international context, its most notable usage was as the site of the Canada Women's Sevens, an event in the World Rugby Women's Sevens Series for national rugby sevens teams, from the event's inception until 2023. The stadium also hosted the BC Bears of the Canadian Rugby Championship from 2009 to 2013, and the Victoria Highlanders soccer team from 2009 to 2011.

The main stadium seats 6,000 and has 18 VIP suites, four change rooms, officials' rooms, concession, storage, and public washrooms. The field is built to FIFA 2-Star and World Rugby specifications, able to accommodate soccer, football, and rugby matches. Before expansion in 2019, the stadium had 1,600 permanent seats.

== Secondary field ==
There is a second artificial turf field about 100 metres (330 ft) to the west named Goudy Field that has seating for 1,500. This second full-sized field is also FIFA 2-Star rated and can accommodate the Canadian Rugby Association football codes.

== History ==
Starlight Stadium at City Centre Park was opened in 2009 as Bear Mountain Stadium. On September 29, 2012, the name was changed to Westhills Stadium after a land development company.

On July 20, 2018, It was first announced that Westhills would host Pacific FC of the Canadian Premier League beginning in 2019. The stadium underwent renovations to increase capacity to 6,000 and provide additional amenities.

On March 27 and 31, 2020, the Canadian men's national soccer team was scheduled to play two friendly matches against Trinidad and Tobago at Westhills. On March 13, 2020, these matches were cancelled due to the COVID-19 pandemic in Canada. The women's national team hosted Australia on December 1, 2023, as part of a farewell tour for Christine Sinclair. The match had 6,102 spectators and ended in a 5–0 victory for Canada.

In April 2021, the stadium was renamed to Starlight Stadium after a five-year naming rights deal. Toronto-based Starlight Investments will pay more than CA$500,000 for the rights with about 85% going to Pacific FC and the rest to the City of Langford.

In February 2024, Starlight Stadium hosted 2024 CONCACAF Champions Cup matches despite Pacific FC's failure to qualify. Due to a scheduling conflict in BC Place and weather concerns at ATCO Field, the Vancouver Whitecaps FC and Cavalry FC arranged to play their first-round home matches in Langford. The front offices said that Starlight Stadium was the closest available venue that met CONCACAF's stadium standards.

In 2025, the stadium hosted a preseason game between the BC Lions and Calgary Stampeders of the Canadian Football League. The Lions returned in 2026, playing a preseason game against the Edmonton Elks.

== Rugby union ==
Date	Away	Score	Home	Attendance
February 4, 2017	Argentina XV	20–6	Canada	2,000
February 11, 2017	Chile	15–36	Canada	1,509
February 17, 2018	Brazil	5–45	Canada	1,500
February 22, 2019	Chile	0–56	Canada	1,000
March 1, 2019	Argentina XV	39–23	Canada	—

== See also ==
- List of Canadian Premier League stadiums
