= Gordon McRorie =

Canada international rugby union player

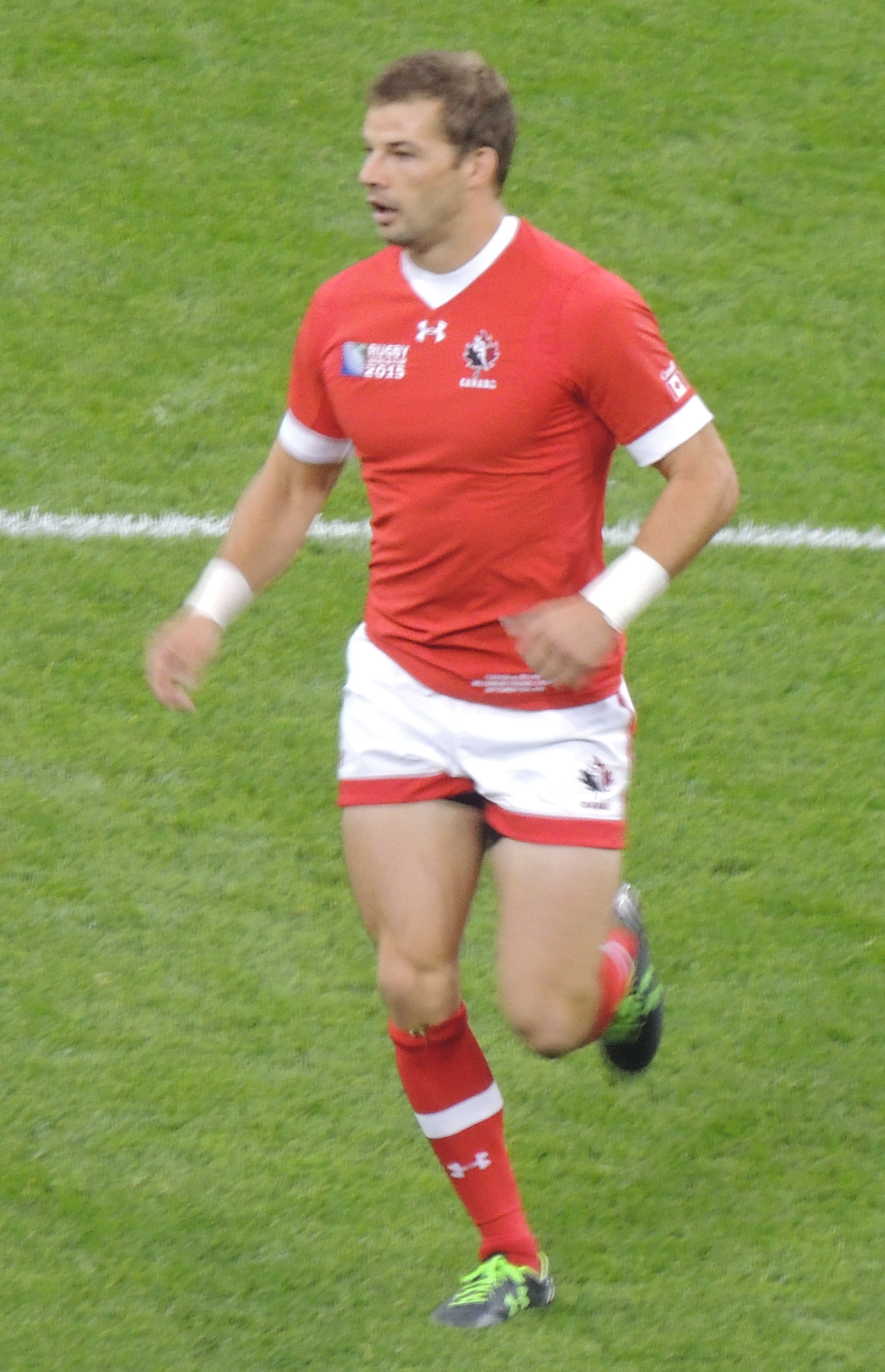
- Gordon McRorie at the 2015 World Cup
- Born: May 12, 1988 (age 38) Stirlingshire, Scotland
- Height: 1.78 m (5 ft 10 in)
- Weight: 80 kg (176 lb)

Rugby union career
- Position: Scrum half
Senior career
| Years | Team | Apps | (Points) |
| 2020− | Rugby Milano | | |
International career
| Years | Team | Apps | (Points) |
| 2014– | Canada A | 15 | (77) |
| 2014- | Canada | 43 | (283) |
- Correct as of 9 September 2019

Gordon McRorie (born 12 May 1988) is a rugby union scrumhalf who plays for AS rugby Milano and Canada. McRorie made his debut for Canada in 2014 and was part of the Canada squad at the 2015 Rugby World Cup.

== Early life ==
McRorie was born in Stirlingshire, Scotland and attended Stirling University.
