= Kyle Gilmour =

Canada international rugby union player

- Born: January 26, 1988 (age 38) Fort McMurray, Alberta
- Height: 1.85 m (6 ft 1 in)
- Weight: 105 kg (231 lb)

Rugby union career
- Position: Loose forward
International career
Years	Team	Apps	(Points)
2013–present	Canada	18	(0)

Kyle Gilmour (born January 26, 1988, in Fort McMurray, Alberta) is a Canadian rugby union flanker who plays for Rotherham and Canada. Gilmour made his debut for Canada in 2013 and was part of the Canada squad at the 2015 Rugby World Cup.
