= Canadian Rugby Championship =

Canadian amateur rugby union competition

- Sport: Rugby Union
- Founded: 2009; 17 years ago
- Folded: 2018
- No. of teams: 4
- Country: Canada
- Last champion: Ontario Blues (6th title)
- Most titles: Ontario Blues (6 titles)
- Website: canadianrugbychampionship.com

The Canadian Rugby Championship (CRC; French: Championnat provincial du Canada de rugby à XV) was a Canadian amateur rugby union competition, partially funded by the World Rugby. It was the highest level of men's domestic rugby in Canada. Four representative teams from regions across Canada competed for the MacTier Cup. The CRC was started in 2009 by Rugby Canada and was held annually from August to September. Rugby Canada also held CRC tournaments for under-19 men, under-20 women, and senior women.

== History ==
=== The North America 4 ===
In 2006, the IRB started the North America 4 (NA4), to help create a higher level of rugby in North America, as well as to develop players and provide a pathway to national team selection and to make North American rugby teams more competitive at international level. It was contested by four teams, two each from Canada and the USA.

=== The American Rugby Championship ===
On September 7, 2009, the IRB scrapped the NA4 and unveiled the ARC competition, in which Canada, the US and Argentina would send representative teams to play for a championship title (Tonga was later added in the second season, replaced with Uruguay from 2012 onwards)

In order to select a team that would play in the ARC, Rugby Canada unveiled the CRC, with the champion and runner-up advancing to the ARC. The BC Bears Coached by Mike James and Kris de Scossa were inaugural champions, who went on to play Argentina Jaguars, Russia and England Counties. Following the first season, a Canada Selects team was chosen by Team Canada coach Kieran Crowley instead, exclusively from players who competed in the CRC.

=== The CRC ===
In the inaugural 2009 season, six games were played in a round-robin format, similar to that of The Rugby Championship, with the team collecting the most points over the season being named champions.

The following season, the same six game season was used, however a post-season was added—with the top two teams squaring off in a final at the home venue of the team which amassed the most points during the regular season.

In 2011 the format changed yet again, scrapping the final and instead going back to a round-robin competition. This time with ten games, each team playing five. The western teams (the BC Bears and the Prairie Wolf Pack) played three home games and two away games, while this schedule was reversed for the two eastern teams, (the Ontario Blues and the Atlantic Rock). In 2012, this was switched, having the western teams play two home games and three away games, with the eastern teams playing the opposite.

== Season structure ==
The CRC is broken up into a pre-season and a round robin season, with no postseason. During the pre-season teams play exhibition matches against other teams, usually not participating in the CRC. The pre-season is not a formal one set by the league, but instead the individual teams can play club or touring sides at their own leisure, or may choose to not play any pre-season games at all.

Starting in mid August, and ending late September, the regular season follows the same format as The Rugby Championship, having teams playing in a round robin format, with the team that accumulates the most points throughout the tournament winning the MacTier Cup. Therefore, no post-season is required. Every team plays five games, the western teams playing three at home and two away, while the eastern teams play a reversed schedule. There are no divisions or conferences.

The points system for the season is the same as most rugby competitions around the world:

- 4 points for a win
- 2 points for a draw
- 0 points for a loss
- 1 bonus point for scoring 4 tries or more
- 1 bonus point for losing by 7 points or less

== Awards ==
The Player of the Year award is awarded at the end of the season to recognize the best player that year. The award is decided by votes from all the coaches, as well as a Rugby Canada representative.

== Broadcasting ==
The league had no deals with any networks; however, some teams provide live online streaming of their games. CBC Television aired the 2010 final live, but this was the only match shown on national television.

== Teams ==
Team	Provinces represented	Home field	Capacity	Head coach
BC Bears	British Columbia	Thunderbird Stadium	7,200	Tony Healy
Prairie Wolf Pack	Alberta, Manitoba, Saskatchewan	Calgary Rugby Park	7,500	Col Jeffs
Ontario Blues	Ontario	Sherwood Forest Park / Fletcher's Fields	3,200	Chris Silverthorn
Atlantic Rock	Newfoundland and Labrador, New Brunswick, Nova Scotia, Prince Edward Island, Quebec	Truro Saints RFC / Swilers Rugby Park	6,500	Dr. Pat Parfrey

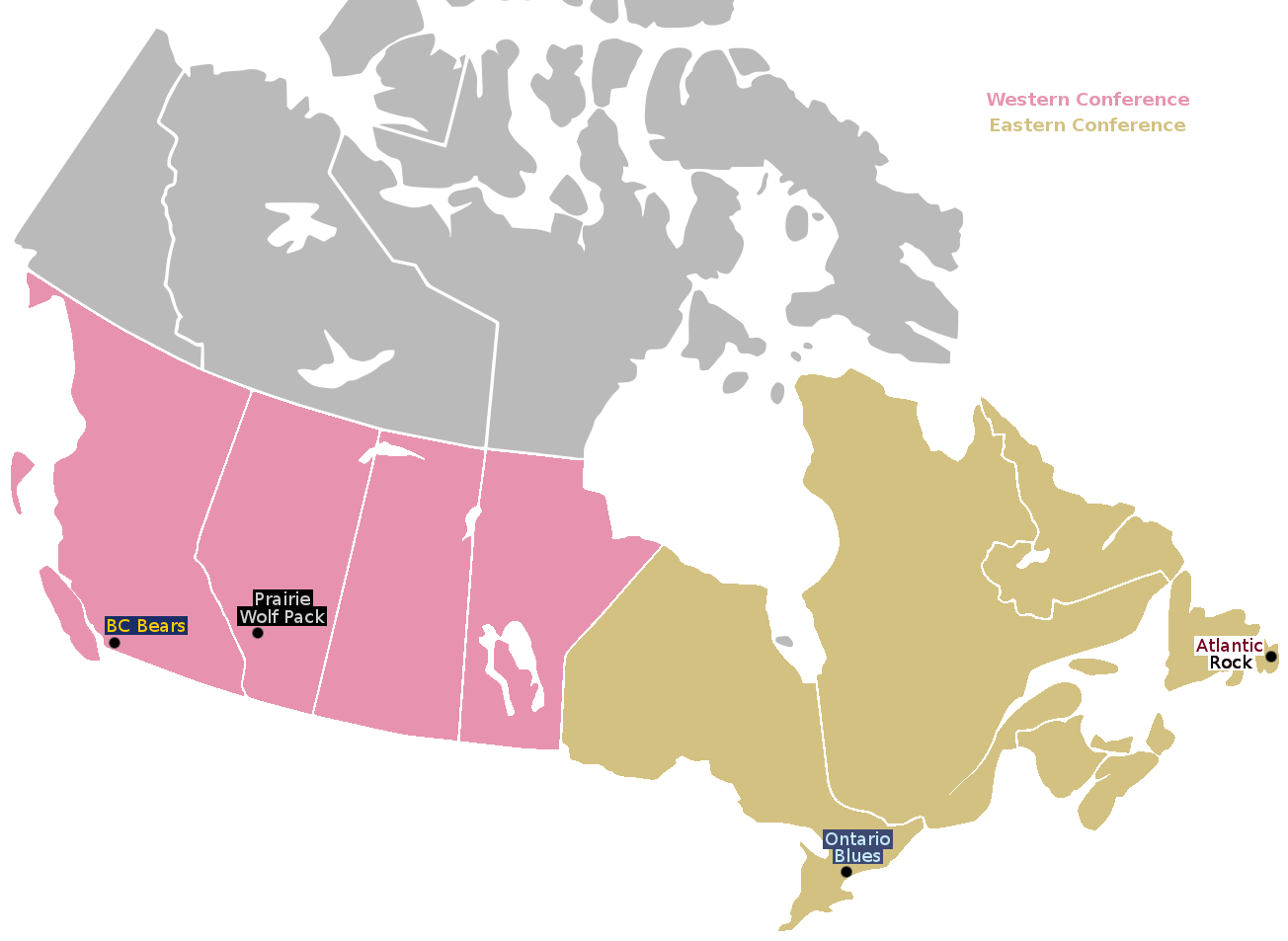

== Champions ==
The MacTier Cup was created in 1998 and awarded to the champion of the Rugby Canada Super League. Since the Super League folded, the MacTier Cup is now awarded to the Canadian Rugby Championship champion.

Year	Champion	Runner-up
2009	BC Bears (1)	Ontario Blues
2010	The Rock (1)	Prairie Wolf Pack
2011	Ontario Blues (1)	BC Bears / Prairie Wolf Pack
2012	Ontario Blues (2)	Prairie Wolf Pack
2013	Ontario Blues (3)	BC Bears
2014	Ontario Blues (4)	Prairie Wolf Pack
2015	Prairie Wolf Pack (1)	Ontario Blues
2016	Ontario Blues (5)	Prairie Wolf Pack
2017	BC Bears (2)	Ontario Blues
2018	Ontario Blues (6)	Atlantic Rock

MacTier Cup championships
Team	Titles
Ontario Blues	6
BC Bears	2
Prairie Wolf Pack	1
Atlantic Rock	1

== See also ==
- Americas Rugby Championship
- North America 4
- Rugby Canada
- Rugby union in Canada
- Rugby Canada Super League (defunct)
