= Derek Daypuck =

Canada international rugby union player

- Born: Derek Martin Daypuck; 20 February 1978 (age 48) London, Ontario
- Height: 1.83 m (6 ft 0 in)
- Weight: 87 kg (13 st 10 lb)
- Occupation: Firefighter

Rugby union career
- Position(s): Fly-half; Inside centre
International career
Years	Team	Apps	(Points)
2004 - 2007	Canada	17 (54)	

Derek Daypuck (born 20 February 1978 in London, Ontario) is a Canadian former Rugby union player. Daypuck played 17 tests for Canada.
