= Ontario Blues =

Canadian rugby union team, based in Toronto

(Canada) Ontario Blues
- Full name: Ontario Blues Rugby Football Club
- Union: Rugby Canada
- Founded: 2009
- Location: Toronto, Ontario
- Ground: Fletcher's Fields (Capacity: 3,000)
- League: Canadian Rugby Championship
Team kit

Official website
- www.rugbyontario.com

The Ontario Blues are the senior men's representative rugby union team for Ontario. They were founded in 2009 to compete in the Americas Rugby Championship against other representative teams from Canada, Argentina, and the United States. In their inaugural season, the Blues suffered narrow losses against British Columbia and the Wolf Pack before defeating the Rock to advance to the Canadian Final. The Blues would again lose to BC, but defeated the U.S. Selects in the bronze medal match.

In 2010, Rugby Canada changed the format of the Canadian competition of the ARC, introducing the CRC. The four Canadian teams which competed in the ARC stayed the same, but now played in the CRC, with a Canadian Selects team being chosen from CRC players, and that selects team going on to represent Canada at the ARC. The Blues went on to win four straight Canadian Rugby Championships from 2011 to 2014 during a stretch where they were 19 wins and one loss over three seasons. The Blues have since won the MacTier Cup in 2016 and 2018.

== Teams ==
In 2017, Rugby Ontario announced that their entire provincial rugby program would be branded under the name "Ontario Blues", replacing the "Ontario Storm" name which had been used for the women's team. The Ontario Blues name now encompasses all provincial representative teams of Rugby Ontario. This includes age-grade competition (U15-U18), development squads (U19 Men's and U20 Women's).

The Ontario Arrows are a privately funded elite club, which is closely related to the Blues organization, that is in negotiations to join the professional Major League Rugby for the 2019 season. The club will play exhibition games in 2018 at York Lions Stadium.

== Season Records ==
=== Americas Rugby Championship ===
Season	Position	Played	Won	Drawn	Lost	Bonus	Points
2009	2nd (Round-robin)	3	1	0	2	3	7
2009	Canadian final	BC Bears 12 – 8 Ontario Blues					

=== Canadian Rugby Championship ===
Season	Position	Played	Won	Drawn	Lost	Bonus	Points
2010	3rd	3	1	0	2	2	6
2011	1st	5	4	0	1	4	20
2012	1st	5	4	0	1	4	20
2013	1st	5	0	0	0	3	23
2014	1st	6	5	0	1	4	24
2015	2nd	2	1	0	1	1	5
2016	1st	4	3	0	1	2	14
2017	2nd	4	2	0	2	3	13
2018	1st	4	3	0	1	2	14

== Honours ==
- Canadian Rugby Championship
  - Champions: 6 (2011, 2012, 2013, 2014, 2016, 2018)

== Current squad ==
Squad for the 2018 Canadian Rugby Championship season.

Props

- Rob Brouwer
- Djustice Sears-Duru
- Ryan Surgenor
- Pat Lynott
- Doug Wooldridge

Hookers

- Eric Howard
- Andrew Quattrin
- Hank McQueen

Locks

- Mike Sheppard
- Paul Ciulini
- Kolby Francis

Flankers

- Andrew Wilson
- Josh van Horne
- Jeremy Wright
- Seb Pearson
- Marcello Wainwright

No 8

- Lucas Rumball
- Peter Milazzo

Scrum Halves

- Andrew Ferguson
- Mario van der Westhuizen
- Riley di Nardo

Fly Halves

- Shawn Windsor
- Kieron Martin
- Roman Cao-Riquelme

Centres

- Jamie Leveridge
- Dan Moor
- Andrew Coe
- Alex Colborne
- Jon West

Wingers

- Josh Campbell
- John Sheridan
- Kainoa Lloyd

Fullbacks

- Rory McDonnell
- Mitch Richardson
- Lucas Hammond

== Notable players ==
=== Canada ===
The following players have represented Canada at full international level.

- Tyler Ardron
- Stu Ault
- Ray Barkwill
- Brett Beukeboom
- Rob Brouwer
- Aaron Carpenter
- Paul Ciulini
- Alistair Clark
- Andrew Coe
- Derek Daypuck
- Tom Dolezel
- Andrew Ferguson
- Eric Howard
- Kainoa Lloyd
- Jamie Mackenzie
- Phil Mackenzie
- Mark MacSween
- Rory McDonell
- Ander Monro
- John Moonlight
- Dan Moor
- Taylor Paris
- Dan Pletch
- Mike Pletch
- Lucas Rumball
- Mike Scholz
- Djustice Sears-Duru
- Mike Sheppard
- Matt Tierney
- Liam Underwood
- Andrew Wilson
- Jordan Wilson-Ross
- Doug Wooldridge

== Games played against international opposition ==
Year	Date	Opponent	Result	Score	Tour
2009	22 August	(United States) Midwest Thunderbirds	Win	38-5	Pre-season exhibition
2009	17 October	(United States) USA Selects	Win	27-24	2009 ARC Bronze medal match
2010	8 June	England Counties	Loss	32-26	2010 Tour of Canada
2010	10 July	(United States) Midwest Thunderbirds	Win	38-5	Pre-season exhibition
2012	5 May	Chile	Loss	19-17	Ontario Blues 2012 South American Tour
2012	8 May	(Argentina) Salta Province	Win	32-26	Ontario Blues 2012 South American Tour
2012	13 May	Uruguay	Win	27-16	Ontario Blues 2012 South American Tour
2013	4 May	(United States) New York Athletic Club RFC	Win	38-23	Pre-season exhibition
2013	23 August	(United States) Life University	Win	36-20	Pre-season exhibition
2016	11 June	England Counties	Loss	73-0	2016 Tour of Canada
2016	29 August	(Republic of Ireland) Cork Constitution	Win	12-10	2016 Tour of Canada
2017	29 April	(United States) Old Blue RFC	Win	43-31	Pre-season exhibition
2017	20 May	(United States) Glendale Raptors	Win	43-25	Pre-season exhibition
