= BC Bears =

Canadian representative rugby union team from British Columbia

(Canada) BC Bears
- Union: Rugby Canada
1st kit	2nd kit

Official website
- www.bcrugby.com

The British Columbia Bears (formerly Pacific Tyee) are the senior men's representative rugby team for British Columbia. They were originally founded in 2009 to compete in the Americas Rugby Championship against other representative teams from Canada, Argentina, and the United States. In their inaugural season, the Bears went undefeated in round robin play against other Canadian teams falling only to the Argentina Jaguars in the ARC Final. From 2010 to 2018 the Bears participated in the Canadian Rugby Championship, along with the Ontario Blues, The Rock, and the Prairie Wolf Pack. This offshoot of the Americas Rugby Championship saw these teams once again compete in a round robin schedule.

== Home grounds ==
The Bears do not have a permanent home ground, but play at various fields around British Columbia. In their inaugural year the team hosted matches at Brockton Oval in Vancouver and MacDonald Park in Victoria as well as at Westhills Stadium (formerly Bear Mountain Stadium) in Langford. The 2010 season saw the Bears play exclusively at Klahanie Park in West Vancouver. In 2011 the team again played a majority of their home games at Klahanie with the exception of one match held at the Apple Bowl in Kelowna. For the 2013 season, the Bears played exclusively at Westhills Stadium.

== Season records ==
=== Americas Rugby Championship ===
Season	Position	Played	Won	Drawn	Lost	Bonus	Points
2009	1st (Round-robin)	3	3	0	0	2	14
2009	Canadian final	BC Bears 12 – 8 Ontario Blues					
2009	ARC final	Argentina Jaguars 35 – 11 BC Bears					

=== Canadian Rugby Championship ===
Season	Position	Played	Won	Drawn	Lost	Bonus	Points
2010	4th	3	0	0	3	0	0
2011	2nd	5	2	0	3	4	12
2012	4th	5	1	0	4	1	5
2013	2nd	5	2	0	3	4	12
2014	3rd	6	2	0	4	2	10
2015	3rd	2	1	0	1	0	4
2016	4th	4	0	0	4	1	1
2017	1st	4	4	0	0	2	18
2018	3rd	4	2	0	2	2	10

=== Best in the West ===
Season	Position	Played	Won	Drawn	Lost	For	Against
2019	1st	2	1	0	1	60	50

== Honours ==
- Canadian Rugby Championship
  - Champions: 2 (2009, 2017)
- Americas Rugby Championship
  - Champions: 0
  - Runners-up: 1 (2009)

== Current squad ==
Squad for the 2018 Canadian Rugby Championship season

Props

- Noah Barker
- John Braddock
- Nik Hildebrand
- Clint Lemkus
- Liam Murray

Hookers

- Paul Ahn
- Steven Ng
- Blake van Heyningen

Locks

- Mike Finnemore
- Craig McLaughlin
- Shea Wakefield
- Cam Polson

Loose forwards

- Dustin Dobravsky
- Luke Campbell
- Jason Hignell
- Travis Larsen
- Connor McCann
- Oliver Nott
- Nathan Stewart

Half backs

- James Pitblado
- Jorden Sandover-Best

Fly halves

- Theo Sauder
- Giuseppe du Toit

Centres

- Doug Fraser
- Mike Nieuwenhuysen
- Josh Thiel

Wings

- Jared Douglas
- Fraser Hurst
- Isaac Kaay
- Clayton Meeres

Full backs

- Sean Ferguson
- Aaron McLelland

== Notable players ==
=== Canada ===
The following players have represented Canada at full international level.

- Ryan Ackerman
- Noah Barker
- George Barton
- Connor Braid
- Mike Burak
- Luke Campbell
- Admir Cejvanovic
- Liam Chisholm
- Luke Cudmore
- Thyssen de Goede
- Dustin Dobravsky
- Joe Dolesau
- Sean Duke
- Giuseppe du Toit
- Brian Erichsen
- Ed Fairhurst
- Aaron Flagg
- Doug Fraser
- Mike Fuailefau
- Mitch Gudgeon
- Ryan Hamilton
- Brodie Henderson
- Nathan Hirayama
- Jake Ilnicki
- Harry Jones
- Adam Kleeberger
- Anthony Luca
- Phil Mack
- Jason Marshall
- Callum Morrison
- Oliver Nott
- Cameron Pierce
- Pat Riordan
- Jorden Sandover-Best
- Theo Sauder
- David Spicer
- Brock Staller
- Josh Thiel
- Conor Trainor
- Sean White
- Eric Wilson

=== Overseas Representatives ===
The following players have achieved representative honours at an international level.

- (Russia) Andrey Proshin

== Games played against international opposition ==
Year	Date	Opponent	Result	Score	Tour
2009	17 October	Argentina Jaguars	Loss	11–35	2009 Americas Rugby Championship Final
2009	24 November	Russia	Win	38–16	2009 Russia tour of Canada
2010	12 June	England Counties	Loss	7–46	2010 Tour of Canada
2010	18 June	Royal New Zealand Navy (HMNZS Te Kaha)	Win	71–5	Part of Canadian Navy's Centennial
2014	16 July	(Argentina) Buenos Aires	Loss	7–38	BC Bears 2014 South American Tour
2014	19 July	Uruguay	Win	21–20	BC Bears 2014 South American Tour
2016	10 August	(New Zealand) North Otago	Tie	22–22	North Otago 2016 Canadian Tour
2018	23 June	(United Kingdom) Royal Air Force	Win	23-19	RAF 2018 Western Canada Tour

== Head coaching history ==
Name	Years	Record	Percentage
Mike James	2009–2010	6–5	54.5%
Kris de Scossa	2011	2–3	40.0%
John MacMillan	2012	1–4	20.0%
Jim Dixon	2013–2014	4–7	36.4%
Dean Murten	2015	2–3	40.0%
Gabriel Fulcher	2016	0–5	0.0%
Tony Healy	2017	4–0	100%
Dean Murten	2018	1-1	50%
Scott Manning	2018	1-1	50%
James Thompson	2019	1-1	50%
