= Swilers RFC =

- Full name: Swilers Rugby Football Club
- Union: Newfoundland Rugby Union
- Nickname: Swilers
- Founded: 1974
- Ground: Swilers Rugby Park (Capacity: 6,500)
- Chairman: Noel Browne
- Coach(es): Patrick Parfrey; Morgan Lovell
Team kit

The Swilers are a Canadian rugby union team based in St. John's, Newfoundland. The team plays in the Newfoundland Rugby League and draws most of its players from the Newfoundland Rugby Union.

The Swilers play their matches at Swilers Rugby Park 100 Crosbie Road, St. John's.
