= Prairie Wolf Pack =

Canadian rugby union club, based in Calgary, Alberta

(Canada) Prairie Wolf Pack
- Union: Rugby Canada
- Founded: 2009; 17 years ago
- Location: Calgary, Alberta
- Ground: Calgary Rugby Park (Capacity: 7,500)
- Coach: Colin Jeffs
- League: Canadian Rugby Championship (2009–)
Team kit

Official website
- wolfpackrugby.com

The Prairie Wolf Pack is a Canadian rugby union team representing the Prairies region in the Canadian Rugby Championship. The Wolf Pack's inaugural season includes a home game at the Calgary Rugby Park against The Rock and away games at the BC Bears and Ontario Blues.

The team finished as runner-ups in 2014.

== Current squad ==
Squad for the 2018 Canadian Rugby Championship season

Props: Logan Jones; Chad Packard; Jacob Horton; Marko Kilmenko; Hubert Buydens; Ryan Kotlewski; Hookers: Gabriel Kajdy; Wade Hodgen; Locks: Conor Turner; Riley Fahlman; Joshua Schlebach	Loose forwards: Nanyak Dala; Kyle Gilmour; Clayton Panga; Kyle Morrison; Jordan Roberts; Grant Crowell; Joshua Pritchett; Half backs: James Buchanan; Gordon McRorie; Fly halves: Robbie Povey; Dalton Campbell; Brock Gallagher	Centres: Gradyn Bowd; Ben LeSage; Nick Blevins; Mozac Samson; Wings: Duncan Maguire; Jeff Hassler; Cole Davis; Jake Bentley; Full backs: Cam Hall; Evan Thomas

== Notable players ==
=== Canada ===
The following players have represented Canada at full international level.

- Hubert Buydens
- Nick Blevins
- Luke Cudmore
- Nanyak Dala
- Scott Franklin
- Kyle Gilmour
- Jeff Hassler
- Brodie Henderson
- Jeremy Kyne
- Gordon McRorie
- Ryan Smith
- Andrew Tiedemann

== Coaching history ==
- Andy Pocock (2009)
- Mike Shelley (2010)
- Colin Jeffs (2011–2012)
- Graeme Moffat (2013)

== 2018 Season (Exhibition) ==
Date	Opponent	Home/Away	Location	Result	Score
4/20	Utah Warriors °	Away	Zions Bank Stadium, Herriman, UT	L	80-12

° = Preseason Game
