= Atlantic Rock =

Canadian rugby union club, based in St.John's, Newfoundland and Labrador

(Canada) Atlantic Rock
- Union: Rugby Canada
- Nickname: The Rock
- Founded: 2009; 17 years ago
- Location: St. John's, Newfoundland and Labrador
- Ground: Swilers Rugby Park (Capacity: 6,500)
- Coach: Patrick Parfrey
- League: Canadian Rugby Championship
1st kit	2nd kit

Official website
- rockrugby.ca

Atlantic Rock, also known as The Rock, is a Canadian rugby union team based in St. John's, Newfoundland and Labrador. The team plays in the Canadian Rugby Championship (CRC) and is intended to draw most of its players from the rugby unions of Canada's five Eastern provinces: Quebec, New Brunswick, Nova Scotia, Prince Edward Island (PEI) and Newfoundland & Labrador.

The organization is a successor to the four Rugby Canada Super League (RCSL) teams of those unions (PEI did not have a team), and was created when the IRB and Rugby Canada decided to create a "hemispheric" rugby competition - the ARC.

The Rock played their only home game of 2009 at Swilers Rugby Park in St. John's.

== History ==
Prior to 2009, senior men's rugby east of Ontario had three levels: Canada East, a single team that was a competitor in the IRB's NA4 North American rugby competition, the four RCSL teams in the area (Quebec Caribou, New Brunswick Black Spruce, Nova Scotia Keltics and the Newfoundland Rock) and local club rugby.

In 2009, Rugby Canada and the IRB decided to expand the NA4 competition to become the Americas Rugby Championship. In this new competition, there would be four Canadian teams (B.C., the Prairies, Ontario and one to represent all of Canada's five easternmost provinces. Additionally, the RCSL was disbanded, to be replaced with a new Under-20 league called the Rugby Canada National Junior Championship. Effectively, this new senior competition (the ARC) replaced both of the top two (NA4, RCSL) tiers of senior men's Canadian rugby.

In 2010, the Rugby Canada changed the format of the Canadian competition of the ARC, introducing the CRC. The 4 Canadian teams which competed in the ARC stayed the same, but now played in the CRC, with a Canadian Selects team being chosen from CRC players, and that selects team going on to represent Canada at the ARC.

Though St. John's is actually the 5th largest urban area in the region (after Montreal, Quebec City, Halifax and Gatineau), it had a strong rugby community at the time the league was created. Specifically, it had a strong recent tradition of success in national competitions, with the Newfoundland Rock having won the RCSL's Eastern Division (which included Ontario teams) five of the seven years immediately preceding the creation of the ARC. Therefore, Rugby Canada decided to support the placement of the "Eastern / Atlantic Canadian" team in St. John's.

Demonstrating the strength of the predecessor organization (and possibly as a result of the team's placement in St. John's), a majority of the team's initial squad had played for the Newfoundland Rock in previous years.

== 2009 season ==
The team's 2009 schedule included two away games (in Calgary against the Prairie Wolf Pack, and Toronto against the Ontario Blues), as well as one game at home in St. John's (against the BC Bears). If the team had been able to finish in one of the top two positions (of four), it would have won a place in the "Canada Semi-Final" of the ARC. The winner of that match played against the winner of USA Select XV vs. Argentina Jaguars for the inaugural championship.

The Rock played their first match on 4 September 2009, defeating the Prairie Wolf Pack 31-23 in Calgary. The Rock scored 5 tries, giving them a bonus point in the standings for having scored four or more. However, the season did not continue as successfully, with a close 9-8 loss at home in Newfoundland against the BC Bears, and a thorough 32-5 defeat against the Ontario Blues in Ontario. Thus, the Rock finished third in the ARC's Canadian Division, and did not advance to the playoff matches.

== Current squad ==
Squad for the 2018 Canadian Rugby Championship season

Props: Alex Forrest; Martial Lagain; Bob Rogers; Keelan Chapman; Frank Walsh; Cole Keith; Hookers: Jordan Power; Benoit Piffero; Owen Parfrey; Chris Seyler; Locks: Brad Lester; Liam Carter; Lucas Hotton; Conor Keys	Loose forwards: Kyle Baillie; Zac Coughlan; Moe Abdelmonem; Mike Hamson; Kevin Parfrey; Matt Heaton; Half backs: Scott Forrest; Jaime MacKenzie; Matt Murphy; Fly halves: Graham Barry; Tony Pomroy; Pat Parfrey	Centres: Llyr Morris; Geoff Warden; Shane Stratton; Maxime Perrault; Jordan Wilson-Ross; Wings: Tyler Wish; Robert Wilson; Patrick McNicholas; Aidan McMullan; Josh Campbell; Bryce Thomassin; Full back: Cooper Coats; Morgan Lovell
