= List of Canadian national under-20 rugby team rosters =

Below is a list of Canadian national under-20 rugby union team rosters for World Rugby sanctioned tournaments.

== 2008 IRB Junior World Championship Roster ==
Canada's 26-man squad for the 2008 IRB Junior World Championship in Wales.

Backs
Player	Position	Club
Jamie Mackenzie	Scrum-half	(Canada) Oakville Crusaders
Sean White	Scrum-half	(Canada) James Bay AA
Nathan Hirayama (c)	Fly-half	(Canada) University of Victoria
Peter Jawl	Fly-half	(Canada) Castaway Wanderers RFC
Taylor Dalziel	Centre	(Canada) University of British Columbia
Matt Evans	Centre	(England) Hartpury College
Mike Scholz	Centre	(Canada) Oakville Crusaders
Conor Trainor	Centre	(Canada) UBC Old Boys Ravens
Kyle Buckley	Wing	(Canada) Balmy Beach RFC
Tyrone Shannon	Wing	(Canada) Port Alberni Blacksheeps
Harry Jones	Full-back	(Canada) Capilano RFC
Jordan Wilson-Ross	Full-back	(Canada) Alliston Timberwolves

Forwards
Player	Position	Club
Ryan Hamilton	Hooker	(Canada) Capilano RFC
Russel Meidinger	Hooker	(Canada) Strathcona Druids RFC
Justin Chelak	Prop	(Canada) UBC Old Boys Ravens
Mauro Perizzolo	Prop	(Canada) Burnaby Lake Rugby Club
Andrew Tiedemann	Prop	(Canada) St. Albert RFC
Russell Ward	Prop	(Canada) Irish Canadians RFC
Michael Berg	Lock	(Canada) Burnaby Lake Rugby Club
Struan Robertson	Lock	(Canada) Cowichan RFC
Josh Schlebach	Lock	(Canada) Calgary Irish
Thyssen de Goede	Back row	(Canada) James Bay AA
Ian Manly	Back row	(Canada) Cowichan RFC
Seb Pearson	Back row	(England) Leicester Tigers Academy
Keegan Selby	Back row	(Canada) Lindsay RFC
Toni Wodzicki	Back row	(Canada) Montreal Wanderers RFC

== 2009 IRB Junior World Championship Roster ==
Canada's 26-man squad for the 2009 IRB Junior World Championship in Japan.

Backs
Player	Position	Club
Kyle Armstrong	Scrum-half	(Canada) Ajax Wanderers
Patrick Fraser	Scrum-half	(Canada) Cowichan RFC
Connor Braid	Fly-half	(Canada) James Bay
Harry Jones (c)	Fly-half	(Canada) University of British Columbia
Taylor Dalziel	Centre	(Canada) University of British Columbia
Christopher Dickenson	Centre	(Canada) Oakville Crusaders
Aaron Johnstone	Centre	(Canada) Capilano RFC
Conor Trainor	Centre	(Canada) UBC Old Boys Ravens
Christopher Barrett	Wing	(Canada) Queen's University
William Phillipson	Wing	(Canada) University of British Columbia
Grant Schneider	Wing	(Canada) Oakville Crusaders
Jordan Wilson-Ross	Full-back	(Canada) Alliston Timberwolves

Forwards
Player	Position	Club
Jamal Allen	Hooker	(Canada) University of Victoria
Evan Mallory	Hooker	(Canada) Capilano RFC
Justin Chelak	Prop	(Canada) UBC Old Boys Ravens
Ryan Fried	Prop	(Canada) Wilmot Warthogs
Richard Townsend	Prop	(England) Hartpury College
Nick Wallace	Prop	(United States) St. Mary's College
Brett Beukeboom	Lock	(Canada) Lindsay RFC
Dakota Poole	Lock	(Canada) Kelowna Crows RFC
Josh Schlebach	Lock	(Canada) Calgary Irish
Andrew Crow	Back row	(Canada) Castaway Wanderers RFC
Jesse Kliman	Back row	(Canada) University of Victoria
Jeff McKinnon	Back row	(Canada) Capilano RFC
Seb Pearson	Back row	(England) Leicester Tigers Academy
Toni Wodzicki	Back row	(Canada) Montreal Wanderers

== 2010 IRB Junior World Trophy Roster ==
Canada's 26-man squad for the 2010 IRB Junior World Rugby Trophy in Moscow, Russia.

Head Coach: (Canada) Tim Murdy

Assistant Coaches: Tony Healy, Quentin Fyffe Strength and Conditioning: Joe McCullum Manager: Myles Spencer Therapist: Ben Suen Physician: Dr. Anthony Dixon Communications/Video Analyst: Andrew Smith

Backs
Player	Position	Club
Pat Fraser	Scrum-half	(Canada) Cowichan RFC
Matt Yanagiya	Scrum-half	(Canada) Capilano RFC
Connor Braid	Fly-half	(Canada) James Bay AA
Liam Underwood	Fly-half	(Canada) Balmy Beach
Josh Dufrense	Centre	(Canada) Nor'Westers RFC
Tye Hamblin	Centre	(Canada) Cowichan RFC
Jeff Hassler	Centre	(Canada) Okotoks Foothills Lions
Patrick Parfrey, Jr.	Centre	(Canada) Swilers RFC
Kurtis Appeldoorn	Wing	(Canada) Abbotsford RFC
Beau Parker	Wing	(Canada) University of Victoria
Keaton Styles	Wing	(Canada) Bayside Sharks
Sean Ferguson	Full-back	(Canada) University of British Columbia

Forwards
Player	Position	Club
Casey Cavers	Hooker	(Canada) Cowichan RFC
Liam Murray	Hooker	(Canada) Capilano RFC
Admir Cevjanovic	Prop	(Canada) Burnaby Lake Rugby Club
Ryan Fried	Prop	(Canada) Wilmot Warthogs
Alex Kam	Prop	(Canada) University of British Columbia
Scott MacLeod	Prop	(Canada) Cowichan RFC
Brett Beukeboom	Lock	(Canada) Lindsay RFC
Scott MacDonald	Lock	(Canada) Oshawa Vikings RFC
Dakota Poole	Lock	(Canada) Kelowna Crows RFC
Adam Zaruba	Lock	(Canada) Capilano RFC
Tyler Ardron	Back row	(Canada) Peterborough Pagans
Andrew Crow (c)	Back row	(Canada) Castaway Wanderers RFC
Matt Kelly	Back row	(Canada) Toronto Nomads RFC
Jeff McKinnon	Back row	(Canada) Capilano RFC

== 2011 IRB Junior World Trophy Roster ==
Canada's 26-man squad for the 2011 IRB Junior World Rugby Trophy in Tbilisi, Georgia.

Backs
Player	Position	Club
Andrew Ferguson	Scrum-half	(Canada) Oakville Crusaders
Lucien Nel	Scrum-half	(Canada) Cowichan RFC
Carlin Hamstra	Fly-half	(Canada) Cowichan RFC
Michael Fuailefau	Centre	(Canada) Castaway Wanderers RFC
Clayton Meeres	Centre	(England) Camborne RFC
Dylan Mundy	Centre	(Canada) Oshawa Vikings
Patrick Parfrey, Jr.	Centre	(Canada) Swilers RFC
Kurtis Appeldoorn	Wing	(Canada) Abbotsford RFC
Josh Blair	Wing	(Canada) Ormstown Saracens RFC
Jeff Hassler	Wing	(Canada) Okotoks Foothills Lions
Patrick Kay	Full-back	(Canada) Cowichan RFC
Liam Underwood	Full-back	(Canada) Balmy Beach

Forwards
Player	Position	Club
Casey Cavers	Hooker	(Canada) Cowichan RFC
Andrew Cho	Hooker	(Canada) Calgary Saracens RFC
Scott MacLeod	Prop	(Canada) Cowichan RFC
Graeme Mahar	Prop	(Canada) Balmy Beach
Jordan Power	Prop	(Canada) Dogs RFC
Brandon Tennant	Prop	(Canada) Montreal Irish RFC
Johnny Humphries	Lock	(Canada) Castaway Wanderers RFC
Scott MacDonald	Lock	(Canada) Oshawa Vikings RFC
Cameron Pierce	Lock	(Canada) Kelowna Crows RFC
Tyler Ardron (c)	Back row	(Canada) Brantford Harlequins RFC
Dustin Dobravsky	Back row	(Canada) University of Victoria
Matt Kelly	Back row	(Canada) Toronto Scottish RFC
Evan Olmstead	Back row	(Canada) Capilano RFC
Cam Stones	Back row	(Canada) Ajax Wanderers RFC

== 2012 IRB Junior World Trophy Roster ==
Canada's 26-man squad for the 2012 IRB Junior World Rugby Trophy in Salt Lake City, USA.

Backs
Player	Position	Club
Mike Dalsin	Scrum-half	(Canada) Castaway Wanderers RFC
Andrew Ferguson	Scrum-half	(Canada) Oakville Crusaders
Doug Crowe	Fly-half	(Canada) Vancouver Rowing Club
Conor McCann	Fly-half	(France) Clermont Espoirs
Gradyn Bowd	Centre	(Canada) Red Deer Titans
Michael Fuailefau	Centre	(Canada) University of Victoria
Clayton Meeres	Centre	(Canada) Abbotsford RFC
Josh Hart	Wing	(Canada) Cowichan RFC
Lucas Hammond	Wing	(Canada) Toronto Nomads RFC
Taylor Paris	Wing	(Scotland) Glasgow Warriors
Patrick Kay	Full-back	(Canada) University of Victoria
Jon West	Full-back	(Canada) Markham Irish RFC

Forwards
Player	Position	Club
Casey Reed	Hooker	(Canada) Moosejaw Nads RFC
Eric Selvaggi	Hooker	(Canada) Aurora Barbarians
Noah Barker	Prop	(Canada) Vancouver Rowing Club
Lucas Hoppe	Prop	(Canada) Lindsay RFC
Jake Ilnicki (c)	Prop	(Canada) University of Victoria
Alex Marshall	Prop	(Canada) Vandals RFC
Luke Campbell	Lock	(Canada) University of Victoria
Andrew McGinn	Lock	(Canada) James Bay AA
Ryan Monahan	Lock	(Canada) Baymen RFC
Jacob Rumball	Lock	(Canada) Balmy Beach RFC
Jared Douglas	Back row	(Canada) Abbotsford RFC
Matthew Heaton	Back row	(Canada) St-Anne-de-Bellevue RFC
Chase Kelliher	Back row	(Canada) Capilano RFC
Cam Stones	Back row	(Canada) Ajax Wanderers RFC

== 2013 IRB Junior World Trophy Roster ==
Canada's 26-man squad for 2013 IRB Junior World Rugby Trophy in Temuco, Chile.

Backs
Player	Position	Club
Lucas Hammond	Scrum-half	(Canada) Toronto Nomads
James Pitblado	Scrum-half	(Canada) University of Victoria
Jorden Sandover-Best	Scrum-half	(Canada) University of British Columbia
Conor McCann	Fly-half	(Canada) Balmy Beach RFC
Shane O'Leary	Fly-half	(Ireland) Young Munster
Charles DeBove	Centre	(Canada) Ste-Anne-de-Bellevue
Patrick Kay (c)	Centre	(Canada) University of Victoria
Jonny LaPlaca	Centre	(Canada) Barrie
Nathan Yanagiya	Centre	(Canada) Capilano RFC
Justin Douglas	Wing	(Canada) Abbotsford RFC
Jacob Webster	Wing	(Canada) Lindsay RFC
Jack Fitzpatrick	Full-back	(Ireland) Dublin University Football Club

Forwards
Player	Position	Club
Sawyer Herron	Hooker	(Canada) University of Victoria
Alex Mascott	Hooker	(Canada) University of British Columbia
Neil Courtney	Prop	(Canada) University of British Columbia
Jason Galbraith	Prop	(Canada) Meraloma Rugby
Ryan March	Prop	(Canada) Abbotsford RFC
Djustice Sears-Duru	Prop	(England) Leicester Tigers Academy
Connor Hamilton	Lock	(Canada) University of British Columbia
Thomas Roche	Lock	(Canada) Meraloma Rugby
Peter van Buren	Lock	(Canada) Calgary Hornets
Jordan Reid-Harvey	Back row	(Canada) Capilano RFC
Matthew Heaton	Back row	(Canada) Ste-Anne-de-Bellevue
Matt Mullins	Back row	(Canada) Belleville Bulldogs RFC
Jack Smith	Back row	(Canada) Humber College
Charlie Thorpe	Back row	(Canada) University of British Columbia

== 2014 IRB Junior World Trophy Roster ==
Canada's 26-man squad for the 2014 IRB Junior World Rugby Trophy in Hong Kong.

Backs
Player	Position	Club
James Pitblado	Scrum-half	(Canada) University of Victoria
Jorden Sandover-Best	Scrum-half	(Canada) University of British Columbia
Simon Sexton	Scrum-half	(England) Ealing Trailfinders
Fergus Hall	Fly-half	(Canada) University of Victoria
Adam McQueen	Fly-half	(Canada) Queen's University
Sam Hayward	Centre	(Australia) Sydney University FC
Ben Lesage	Centre	(Canada) University of British Columbia
Nathan Yanagiya	Centre	(Canada) University of Victoria
Charles DeBove	Wing	(Canada) James Bay AA
Justin Douglas	Wing	(Canada) Abbotsford RFC
Joe Erlic	Wing	(Canada) University of Victoria
Harjun Gill	Full-back	(Canada) University of British Columbia

Forwards
Player	Position	Club
Sawyer Herron	Hooker	(Canada) University of Victoria
Matt Harrison	Hooker	(Canada) UBC Old Boys Ravens
Neil Courtney	Prop	(Canada) University of British Columbia
Djustice Sears-Duru	Prop	(Canada) Castaway Wanderers RFC
MacBryan Bos	Prop	(Canada) University of Victoria
Liam Beaulieu	Prop	(Canada) Bayside Sharks
Connor Hamilton (c)	Lock	(Canada) University of British Columbia
Josh Larsen	Lock	(New Zealand) Taieri RFC
Max van Dijk	Lock	(Canada) University of Guelph
Lucas Rumball	Back row	(Canada) Queen's University
Jack Smith	Back row	(Canada) James Bay AA
Matt Mullins	Back row	(Canada) Queen's University
George Jeavons-Fellows	Back row	(England) The King's School
Reid Tucker	Back row	(Canada) University of Victoria

== 2015 World Rugby Junior World Trophy Roster ==
Canada's 26-man squad for the 2015 World Rugby Under 20 Trophy in Lisbon, Portugal.

Backs
Player	Position	Club
Dan Joyce	Scrum-half	(Ireland) Trinity College
Tony Pomroy	Scrum-half	(Canada) Baymen RFC
Owen Brombal	Scrum-half	(Canada) Guelph Redcoats
Dylan Horgan	Fly-half	(Ireland) UCC Rugby Club
Giusseppe du Toit	Fly-half	(Canada) University of Victoria
Phil Berna	Centre	(Canada) University of British Columbia
Emil Sehic	Centre	(Canada) Fredericton Loyalists
Mitch Santilli	Centre	(Canada) Brantford Harlequins
Karsten Leitner	Wing	(Canada) University of British Columbia
Theo Sauder	Wing	(Canada) University of British Columbia
Andrew Coe	Full-back	(Canada) University of British Columbia
Harjun Gill	Full-back	(Canada) University of British Columbia

Forwards
Player	Position	Club
Patrick Finlay	Hooker	(Ireland) Trinity College
John Shaw	Hooker	(Canada) Bytown Blues
Brendan Blaikie	Prop	(Canada) Queen's University
Cali Martinez	Prop	(Canada) University of British Columbia
Matt Tierney	Prop	(Canada) Mississauga Blues
Bryce Worden	Prop	(Canada) Burnaby Lake Rugby Club
Conor Young	Prop	(Australia) Southern Districts RC
Paul Ciulini	Lock	(Canada) Aurora Barbarians
Adrian Wadden	Lock	(Canada) Oakville Crusaders
Reegan O’Gorman	Lock	(Canada) Vancouver Rowing Club
Lucas Rumball (c)	Back row	(Canada) Balmy Beach
Oliver Nott	Back row	(Canada) University of Victoria
Luke Bradley	Back row	(Canada) University of Victoria
Mitch Rothman	Back row	(Canada) Vancouver Rowing Club

== 2016 World Rugby Junior World Trophy Roster ==
Canada's 25-man squad for the 2016 North American World Rugby Under 20 Trophy Qualifier in Austin, Texas, USA.

Backs
Player	Position	Club
Cole Keffer	Scrum-half	(Canada) University of British Columbia
Keaton Porter	Scrum-half	(Canada) Aurora Barbarians
Gavin Rowell	Scrum-half	(Canada) University of Victoria
Robbie Povey	Fly-half	(England) Luton RFC
Mitch Richardson	Fly-half	(Canada) McMaster University
George Barton	Centre	(France) Clermont Espoirs
Phil Berna	Centre	(Canada) University of British Columbia
Trent Cooper	Centre	(Canada) James Bay Athletic Association
Will Manhire	Centre	(England) London Scottish Academy
Aaron Evison	Wing	(Canada) James Bay Athletic Association
Theo Sauder	Wing	(Canada) University of British Columbia
Andrew Coe (c)	Full-back	(Canada) University of British Columbia

Forwards
Player	Position	Club
Andrew Quattrin	Hooker	(Canada) Laurier University
Connor Sampson	Hooker	(Canada) Burnaby Lake Rugby Club
Brendan Blaikie	Prop	(Canada) Queen's University
Curtis Delmonico	Prop	(Canada) UBC Old Boys Ravens
Cali Martinez	Prop	(Canada) University of British Columbia
Matt Tierney	Prop	(France) Pau Espoirs
Matt Beukeboom	Lock	(Canada) Queen's University
Conor Keys	Lock	(Canada) University of Victoria
Reegan O’Gorman	Lock	(New Zealand) Marist Albion
Luke Bradley	Back row	(Canada) University of Victoria
Peter Milazzo	Back row	(Canada) University of Western Ontario
Nakai Penny	Back row	(Canada) University of British Columbia
Adrian Wadden	Back row	(Canada) McMaster University

== 2017 World Rugby Junior World Trophy Roster ==
Canada's 26-man squad for the 2017 World Rugby Under 20 Trophy in Montevideo, Uruguay.

Backs
Player	Position	Club
Fraser Hurst	Scrum-half	(Canada) University of British Columbia
William McDougall-Percillier	Scrum-half	(Canada) Cowichan Piggies RFC
Will Kelly	Fly-half	(Canada) Brantford Harlequins
Brennig Prevost	Fly-half	(Canada) University of Victoria
George Barton (c)	Centre	(France) Clermont Espoirs
Niko Clironomos	Centre	(Canada) University of British Columbia
Evan Norris	Centre	(Canada) Shawnigan Lake School
Josh Thiel	Centre	(England) Bishop Burton College
Cole Davis	Wing	(Australia) Canberra Royals
Jack McCarthy	Wing	(Canada) Vandals RFC
Anton Ngongo	Wing	(Canada) Castaway Wanderers RFC
Aidan McMullan	Full-back	(Canada) Sainte-Anne-de-Bellevue RFC

Forwards
Player	Position	Club
Jack McRogers	Hooker	(Canada) Aurora Barbarians
Steven Ng	Hooker	(Canada) Capilano RFC
Nick Frost	Prop	(Canada) University of British Columbia
Cole Keith	Prop	(Canada) James Bay
Dewald Kotze	Prop	(Canada) UBCOB Ravens
Liam Murray	Prop	(Canada) Langley RFC
Connor Sampson	Prop	(Canada) University of British Columbia
Matt Beukeboom	Lock	(France) Pau Espoirs
Liam Doll	Lock	(Canada) University of British Columbia
Thomas Davidson	Lock	(Canada) Toronto Scottish RFC
Lachlan Currie	Back row	(Australia) Bond University
Jamie McNaughton	Back row	(Canada) McMaster University
James O'Neill	Back row	(Canada) University of Victoria
Jake Thiel	Back row	(Canada) Abbotsford RFC

== 2018 World Rugby Junior World Trophy Roster ==
Canada's 26-man squad for the 2018 World Rugby Under 20 Trophy in Bucharest, Romania.

Backs
Player	Position	Club
William McDougall-Percillier	Scrum-half	(Canada) University of British Columbia
Brandon Schellenberger	Scrum-half	(Canada) Castaway Wanderers RFC
Gabriel Casey	Fly-half	(Canada) Bytown Blues
Campbell Clarke	Fly-half	(Canada) Swilers RFC
Lachlan Kratz	Centre	(Canada) Castaway Wanderers RFC
Seth Purdey	Centre	(United States) University of California
Kevin Vertkas	Centre	(Canada) University of British Columbia
Elias Ergas	Wing	(Canada) University of British Columbia
Jack McCarthy	Wing	(Canada) Vandals RFC
Josiah Morra	Wing	(Canada) Toronto Saracens
Brennig Prevost	Full-back	(Canada) University of Victoria

Forwards
Player	Position	Club
Jack McRogers	Hooker	(Canada) McMaster University
Tyler Rockwell	Hooker	(Canada) James Bay AA
Gavin Kratz	Prop	(Canada) University of Victoria
Guershom Mukendi	Prop	(Canada) Stoney Creek RFC
Emerson Prior	Prop	(Canada) Trent University
Tyler Rowland	Prop	(Canada) University of British Columbia
Mitchell Wainman	Prop	Unattached
Reid Davis	Lock	(Canada) Bayside Sharks
Tyler Duguid	Lock	(Canada) Nor'Westers RFC
Quentin James	Lock	(France) Perpignan Espoirs
Peter Ingoldsby	Back row	(England) Exmouth RFC
Jackson Matthews	Back row	(Canada) McMaster University
James O'Neill (c)	Back row	(Canada) University of Victoria
Owain Ruttan	Back row	(Canada) University of British Columbia
Michael Smith	Back row	(Canada) University of British Columbia

== 2019 World Rugby Junior World Trophy Roster ==
Canada's 26-man squad for the 2019 World Rugby Under 20 Trophy in São José dos Campos, Brazil.

Backs
Player	Position	Club
Jack Carson	Scrum-half	(Canada) Castaway Wanderers RFC
William Percillier (c)	Scrum-half	(France) Stade Français Paris Espoirs
Brock Webster	Fly-half	(Canada) Oshawa Vikings
Gabriel Casey	Centre	(Canada) Bytown Blues
Lachlan Kratz	Centre	(Canada) University of Victoria
Quinn Ngawati	Centre	(Canada) Westshore RFC
Jarvis Dashkewytch	Wing	(Canada) University of Victoria
Antoine de la Fontaine	Wing	(United States) Saint Mary's College
David Richard	Wing	(Canada) Mississauga Blues
Thomas Isherwood	Full-back	(Canada) Westshore RFC
Avery Oitomen	Full-back	(Canada) Toronto Arrows

Forwards
Player	Position	Club
Jared Augustin	Hooker	(Canada) Queen's University
Michael McCarthy	Hooker	(Canada) Swilers RFC
Guershom Mukendi	Prop	(Canada) Stoney Creek RFC
Tyler Rowland	Prop	(Canada) University of British Columbia
Joshua Tweed	Prop	(Canada) University of British Columbia
Stefan Zuliani	Prop	(Canada) Queen's University
Frank Carson	Lock	(Canada) University of British Columbia
Reid Davis	Lock	(Canada) James Bay AA
Tyler Duguid	Lock	(Canada) Nor'Westers AA
David Carson	Back row	(Canada) University of British Columbia
Nick Carson	Back row	(Canada) University of Victoria
Mason Flesch	Back row	(Canada) Coburg Saxons
Quentin James	Back row	(France) Stade Français Paris Espoirs
Will Matthews	Back row	(Canada) Beaconsfield RFC
Siaki Vikilani	Back row	(Canada) Burnaby Lake Rugby Club

== 2022 U20s Canada Conference Roster ==
Canada's 28-man squad for the 2022 U20s Canada Conference in Guelph, Canada.

(Canada) Adam Roberts (White Rock, BC) - Head Coach

Clay Panga (Victoria, BC) – Assistant Coach Cory Hector (Guelph, ON) – Assistant Coach LeeEllen Carroll (Ottawa, ON) - Manager Aiyanna Grubec (Nanaimo, BC) - Athletic Therapist Jalin Couper (Victoria, BC) - Athletic Therapist Derek Pue (Kamloops, BC) - Video Analyst Rodin Lozada (Toronto, ON) - Video Analyst Mike Jorgenson (Peterborough, ON) - Mental Skills

Backs
Player	Position	Club
Adam Doyle	Scrum-half	(Canada) Queen's University
Sam Reimer	Scrum-half	(Canada) Pacific Pride
James Biss	Fly-half	(England) Durham University
Jamin Hodgkins	Fly-half	(Wales) Cardiff Met University
Liam Bowman (C)	Centre	(France) US Montauban Espoirs
Kobe Faust	Centre	(Canada) Guelph University
Jacob Ince	Centre	(Canada) Guelph University
Talon McMullin	Centre	(Canada) Bayside Sharks
Jack East	Wing	(Canada) Pacific Pride
Alastair Marshall	Wing	(Canada) University of British Columbia
Takoda McMullin	Wing	(Canada) University of British Columbia
Lukas Scheck	Wing	Canada 7s
Ted Champion	Full-back	(United States) University of Arizona

Forwards
Player	Position	Club
Michael Di Lella	Hooker	(Canada) Guelph University
David Scollon	Hooker	(Canada) Guelph University
Ethan Jurgeneit	Prop	(Canada) Trinity Western University
Tyler Matchem	Prop	(Canada) Pacific Pride
Joe McNulty	Prop	(Canada) Capilano RFC
Medhi Porchet	Prop	(France) Stade Montois Espoirs
Payton Teneycke	Prop	(Canada) University of British Columbia
Alastair Bruce	Lock	(Canada) Pacific Pride
Logan Weidner	Lock	(France) Brive Espoirs
Caden Wilson	Lock	(Canada) University of British Columbia
Taine Clague	Back row	(Canada) University of Victoria
Ethan Fryer	Back row	(United States) New England Free Jacks
Sol Jacques	Back row	(Canada) University of British Columbia
Matt Klimchuk	Back row	(Canada) Pacific Pride
Relmu Wilson-Valdes	Back row	(Canada) University of British Columbia

== 2023 World Rugby Junior World Qualifier/Tour Roster ==
Canada's squad for the 2023 World Rugby Under 20 Trophy North American Qualifier two-match series in Spartanburg, South Carolina.

Backs
Player	Position	Club
Stephen Webb	Scrum-half	(Canada) Balmy Beach
Brady White	Scrum-half	(Canada) Pacific Pride
Brenden Black	Fly-half	(Canada) Guelph University
James Webb	Fly-half	(Canada) Queen's University
Marcus D'Acre	Centre	(Canada) Queen's University
Noah Flesch	Centre	(Canada) Pacific Pride
Liam Poulton	Centre	(Canada) University of Victoria
Josh Eustace	Wing	(Canada) Brantford Harlequins
Alastair Marshall	Wing	(Canada) University of British Columbia
Craig Mitchell-Hermann	Wing	(Canada) James Bay AA
James Thiel	Wing	(Canada) Pacific Pride
James Clarke	Full-back	(Canada) Pacific Pride
Owain Cormack	Full-back	(Canada) University of British Columbia

Forwards
Player	Position	Club
Jordan Auger	Hooker	(Canada) University of Victoria
Michael Di Lella, Jr.	Hooker	(Canada) Guelph University
Jeffrey Young	Hooker	(Wales) Cardiff Met University
Aaron Clark	Prop	(Canada) Pacific Pride
Cole Kelly (C)	Prop	(Republic of Ireland) Trinity College Dublin
Evan Roy	Prop	(Canada) University of Ottawa
Charles Trollip	Prop	(Canada) Guleph RFC
Muiredach Casey	Lock	(Canada) University of Victoria
Jaiden John*	Lock	(Canada) Pacific Pride
Joe McNulty	Lock	(Canada) University of British Columbia
Caden Wilson	Lock	(Canada) University of British Columbia
Callum Arneson*	Back row	(Canada) University of British Columbia
Taine Clague	Back row	(Canada) University of Victoria
Sol Jacques	Back row	(Canada) University of British Columbia
Lachlan McGrigor	Back row	(England) University of Bath
Grant Meadows	Back row	(Canada) Brock University
Olly Wiseman	Back row	(Wales) Cardiff Met University

^{*} Players were included in the tour games versus Uruguay U20 and Spain U20 but not in the North American Qualifier matches.
