= British Columbia Rugby Union =

Canadian sports organization

- Sport: Rugby union
- Founded: 1889; 137 years ago
- President: Samantha Shorter
- Website: bcrugby.com

The British Columbia Rugby Union (BCRU) is the provincial administrative body for rugby union in British Columbia, Canada. The BCRU consists of nine sub-unions and 65 clubs. It was originally organized in New Westminster in 1889 where Alfred St. George Hamersley, the former England rugby union captain and recent immigrant to Vancouver, and member of Vancouver Football (Rugby) Club, became the first President. The same man is credited with founding the Amateur Athletic Club of British Columbia. and previously had introduced the game of rugby to the youth of South Canterbury, New Zealand. The current headquarters is on the west side of Vancouver.

British Columbia is considered a hotspot for rugby in Canada, as its mild weather allows the sport to be played year-round.

The BCRU is responsible for organizing the British Columbia Premier League, the provincial men's club championship, and the Ruth Hellerud-Brown Senior Women's Premier Competition. It also oversees provincial representative teams which compete for national championships organized by Rugby Canada.

The BCRU also has a British Columbia Rugby Hall of Fame.

== The BC Premier League ==
The BC Premier League is the highest level of amateur rugby in British Columbia. Many current and former Canadian internationals have participated in the league as well as a number of high-level foreign born players. The champions of the league's playoff system are awarded the Rounsefell Cup.

=== Participating Clubs (2026–27) ===
The BC Premier League is open to a maximum of 12 teams and features the following clubs from Vancouver Island and the Lower Mainland. Prior to the beginning of the 26-27 season, the Rowers returned to the Premier League after a brief absence, and the Pacific Pride left. The 2026 champions are the UBC Old Boys Ravens, who beat UVic 30–3 to claim their 10th Cup.

| Team | Ground | City/Area | Founded |
|---|---|---|---|
| Burnaby Lake | Burnaby Lake Sports Complex | Burnaby | 1994 |
| Capilano | Klahanie Park | North Shore | 1969 |
| Castaway Wanderers | Windsor Park | Oak Bay | 1906 |
| James Bay | MacDonald Park | Victoria | 1886 |
| Meralomas | Connaught Park | Kitsilano | 1923 |
| Ravens | Jericho Park | Point Grey | 1974 |
| UBC Thunderbirds | Wolfson Field | University of British Columbia | 1906 |
| UVIC Vikes | Wallace Field | University of Victoria | 1963 |
| Westshore Valhallians | Juan de Fuca | Langford | 1969 |
| Vancouver Rowing Club | Brockton Oval | Vancouver | 1908 |

== Province Wide First Division ==
=== Participating Clubs (2026-27) ===
The Province Wide First Division includes 19 teams from Vancouver Island, the Lower Mainland and the Fraser Valley, 10 of which are reserve sides for the Premier League.

| Team | Ground | City/Area | Founded |
|---|---|---|---|
| Abbotsford | CFV Exhibition Park | Abbotsford | 1972 |
| Bayside Sharks | South Surrey Athletic Park | White Rock | 1987 |
| Kelowna Crows | Parkinson Recreation Centre | Kelowna | 1969 |
| Axemen | Brennan Park | Sea to Sky | 2014 |
| Cowichan Piggies | Herd Road | Duncan | 1962 |
| Langley | Crush Crescent | Langley | 1969 |
| Nanaimo Hornets | Pioneer Park | Nanaimo | 1888 |
| Port Alberni Black Sheep | Port Alberni Rugby Park | Port Alberni | 1979 |
| Comox Valley Kickers | Cumberland Village Park | Comox | 1889 |

== Province Wide Second Division ==
=== Participating Clubs (2026–27) ===
The Province Wide Second Division includes 10 teams, with the following clubs from the Lower Mainland, the Thompson-Okanagan region and the Fraser Valley.

| Team | Ground | City/Area | Founded |
|---|---|---|---|
| Brit-Lions | John Oliver Park | Delta | 1928 |
| Kamloops Raiders | Exhibition Park | Kamloops | 1968 |
| United | Hume Park | Tri-Cities | 2005 |
| Chilliwack Crusaders | Yarrow Field | Chilliwack | 1978 |
| Surrey Beavers | Sullivan Heights | Surrey | 1972 |
| Richmond | King George Park | Richmond | 1957 |
| Kats | Balaclava Park | Kitsilano | 1953 |
| Ridge Meadows Bruins | Thomas Haney Field | Maple Ridge | 1960 |
| Simon Fraser RC | Simon Fraser University | Simon Fraser University | 1965 |
| Scribes | John Hendry Park | East Vancouver | 1967 |

== Province Wide Third Division ==
=== Participating Clubs (2026–27) ===
The Province Wide Third Division is split into 5 conferences, the Mainland League, the Island League, the Okanagan League, the Kootenay League and the Interior League. The Mainland and Island leagues compete during the fall, winter and spring while the Okanagan, Kootenay and Interior leagues compete during the spring and summer. The champions of the league's 5 conferences play for the Saratoga Cup each Fall.

=== Mainland League ===
This league includes 11 teams, all of which are reserve sides. The Vancouver Rogues are an inclusive team affiliated with the Meralomas, and part of the IGR.

| Team | Ground | City/Area | Founded |
|---|---|---|---|
| Vancouver Rogues | Connaught Park | Kitsilano | 2002 (2021) |

== Women's Leagues ==
The BC Rugby Union also runs a tiered league system for women's teams. There are three tiers, the Women's Premier League, Women's Division One and Women's Division Two Tier 1. The makeup of the teams in each tier is similar to the men, save for a few changes. The lists only include non-reserve teams.

=== Women's Premier League (26-27) ===
- Burnaby Lake
- Westshore
- Meralomas
- Castaway Wanderers
- Vancouver Thunderbirds
- Seattle (playing only exhibition games)
- UBCOB

=== Women's Division One (26-27) ===
- Comox Valley Kickers
- Abbotsford
- Kamloops
- Bayside Sharks
- Capilano
- James Bay
- Nanaimo Hornets
- Kelowna
- United
- Langley

=== Women's Division Two Tier 1 (26-27) ===
- Chilliwack Crusaders
- Simon Fraser RC
- Vancouver Rowing Club
- Ridge Meadows Bruins
- Langley
- Richmond
- Scribes
- Cowichan

== Rounsefell Cup ==
Since 1922, the Rounsefell Cup has been awarded to the Men's Premier League champions. Since 2015, the cup has only been won by two clubs, the UBC Thunderbirds and UBC Old Boys Ravens. James Bay has won the most titles by far, with Meralomas coming in 2nd with 13. Of the current Premier League teams, Westshore, Burnaby Lake and the Pacific Pride have not won the Rounsefell Cup.

| Club | Titles | Most Recent |
|---|---|---|
| James Bay AA | 24 | 2014 |
| Meraloma Club | 13 | 2009 |
| Kats Rugby Club | 12 | 1970 |
| UBCOB Ravens | 10 | 2026 |
| UBC Thunderbirds | 9 | 2023 |
| North Shore All-Blacks | 6 | 1955 |
| Castaway Wanderers | 4 | 2011 |
| King George | 4 | 1931 |
| Capilano RFC | 3 | 2012 |
| UVic Vikes | 3 | 2010 |
| Vancouver Rowing Club | 3 | 1995 |
| Vindex RFC | 3 | 1953 |
| Cowichan RFC | 2 | 1998 |
| Brit-Lions | 2 | 1984 |
| Oak Bay Wanderers | 2 | 1962 |
| South Burnaby | 1 | 1949 |
| Army Victoria | 1 | 1944 |
| Royal Canadian Naval College | 1 | 1943 |
| Lord Byng | 1 | 1942 |
| The 5th Regiment | 1 | 1936 |
| The Canadian Scottish Regiment | 1 | 1931 |
| Central Athletic Club | 1 | 1922 |

== See also ==
- Rugby Canada
- Fraser Valley Rugby Union
- Vancouver Rugby Union
- British Columbia Men's Premier League
- Vancouver Rogues
- Coastal Cup
