= Helen Russell =

Helen Russell may refer to:

- Helen Russell (rugby union)
- Helen Russell (writer)
