= Stephanie White (disambiguation) =

Stephanie White may refer to:

- Stephanie White (born 1977), American basketball coach
- Stephanie White-Arnold (born 1978), American archer
- Stephanie White de Goede (born 1967), Canadian rugby player
- Stephanie A. White (fl. from 1997), American neuroscientist
