= Jen Kish =

Canada international rugby union player

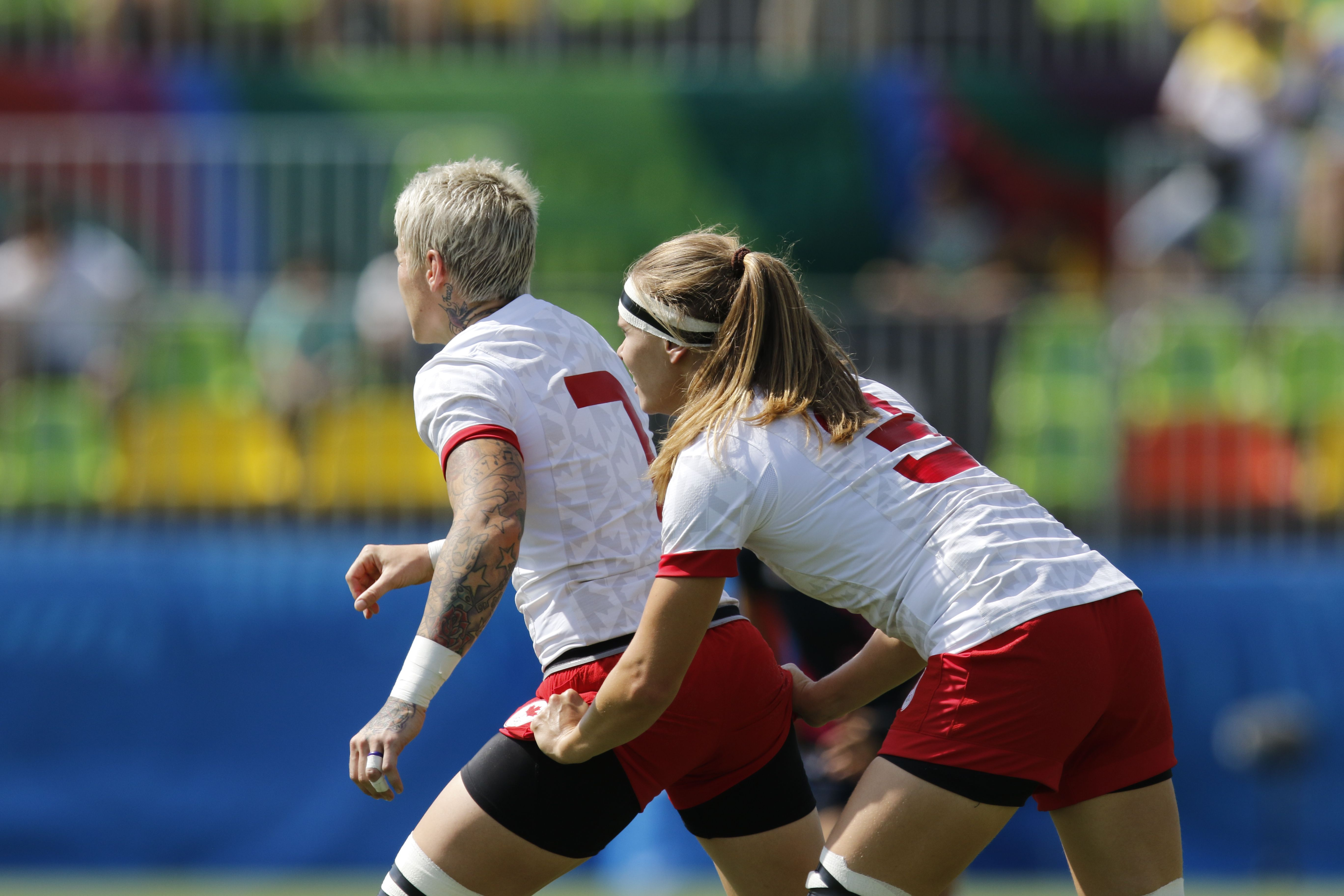
- Born: July 7, 1988 (age 38) Ottawa, Ontario
- Height: 172 cm (5 ft 8 in)
- Weight: 72 kg (159 lb)
- School: W. P. Wagner High School

Rugby union career
- Position(s): Loose forward (7s), Flanker/No. 8 (15s)
Amateur team(s)
Years	Team	Apps	(Points)
–	Edmonton Rockers/AB		
Provincial / State sides
Years	Team	Apps	(Points)
2003-2010	Alberta U-17		
- Alberta U-19
- Senior Alberta
International career
Years	Team	Apps	(Points)
2005-2013?	Canada	33	
National sevens team
Years	Team		Comps
2011–2018	Canada		
Medal record
Women's rugby sevens
Representing Canada
Olympic Games
Bronze medal – third place	2016 Rio de Janeiro	Team competition
Pan American Games
Gold medal – first place	2015 Toronto	Team competition
World Cup 7s
Silver medal – second place	2013 Russia	Team competition

Jennifer "Jen" Kish (born July 7, 1988) is a Canadian former rugby union player. She was a member of Canada's women's sevens team that were runners-up at the 2013 Rugby World Cup Sevens in Russia. Kish captained the sevens squad from 2012-2016 until she left the centralized program and while still player, she was replaced by Ghislaine Landry. She is known for her aerial skills and defence (and her ink). Kish was awarded the Most Influential Athlete of the CAAWS Most Influential Women List of 2016.

== Rugby 15s ==
Kish's dream of being an elite athlete started at an early age and in Grade 2, she put down "professional athlete" as her future profession Kish started rugby in Grade 10 at W. P. Wagner High School in Edmonton because her football coach was a rugby player and suggested she should try the sport.

Kish typically played flanker and occasionally 8-man. Playing for the province of Alberta at 16, her skills were recognized and she joined the U-19 Team Canada roster. Six months later, at 17, before joining the senior women's team, Kish tattooed the Rugby Canada logo on her right calf. She would go on to play in three Nations Cups and the 2010 Women's Rugby World Cup.

== Rugby 7s ==
Kish tried out for the sevens team in 2007, but she was cut after her first tryout . After the 2010 World Cup, John Tait invited Kish to a sevens camp. In 2013, Kish captained Canada to silver at the 2013 Women's Rugby World Cup. Her stellar performance was awarded when she was named the 2013 Sevens Player of the Year, for the second year in a row.

Kish won a gold medal at the 2015 Pan American Games as a member of the Canadian women's rugby sevens team.

In 2016, she was named to Canada's first ever women's rugby sevens Olympic team, which won the bronze medal at the 2016 Summer Olympics in Rio de Janeiro.

Her favourite pre-match tune is "Watch Me Rise" by Mikky Ekko. Her pregame rituals consist of eating mustard before every game and writing what's important to her on her wrists, particularly "#ruckcancer", in honour of her father Steve, a cancer survivor.

Kish announced her retirement on April 30, 2018, due to injuries that forced her to miss the 2018 Commonwealth Games in Gold Coast, Australia and recent Canadian appearances on the Sevens world circuit. Upon the end of her sevens career, Kish played in 134 matches and scored 170 points (34 tries).

In 2019, Kish was on the World Rugby Men's Sevens Player of the Year award and the World Rugby Women's Sevens Player of the Year award voting panels.

== Personal life ==
Kish is openly lesbian. During May 2018, Kish was part of a group of four female athletes, including Cassie Campbell, Fran Rider and Kerrin Lee-Gartner to publicly pledge their brain to a Canadian research centre. The posthumous donation shall be made to Toronto Western Hospital's Canadian Concussion Centre to further research on the effect of trauma on women's brains.

Kish married two-spirit Mohawk (Six Nations of The Grand River) musician Shawnee in 2021. They were married in Edmonton, Alberta by former Premier Rachel Notley.
