= MacDonald Park =

MacDonald Park may refer to:

- MacDonald Park, South Australia, a northern suburb of Adelaide
- MacDonald Park (British Columbia), a football stadium in Victoria, home to the James Bay Athletic Association Rugby Union team
