= Ajax Wanderers R.U.F.C. =

Canadian rugby union club, based in Ontario

(Canada) Ajax Wanderers R.U.F.C.
- Union: Ontario Rugby Union
- Founded: 1949; 77 years ago
- Location: Ajax, Ontario, Canada
- Ground(s): Ajax Rugby Club, 1717 Harwood Ave N (Capacity: 200)
- Coach: Stewart Dobbs (Sr.Men)
- Captain: John Stewart (Sr.Men)
- League: Marshall Provincial Division
1st kit	2nd kit

Official website
- www.ajaxwanderers.com

Ajax Wanderers R.U.F.C. are a rugby union club that is based in Ajax, Ontario, Canada. The Senior men's team currently runs two teams with the top XV squad competing in the Ontario Marshall Provincial division. the 2012 season saw the men win both the 1st division and second division granting them promotion to the Ontario Marshall Premier division for the 2013 season. The Wanderers also run programme for all age groups and genders. The Following Programs are running for the 2014 season;

- Co-ed flag mini rugby under 8, under 10 and under 12 programs.
- 2 u14 boys teams.
- 2 u16 boys teams.
- 2 u18 boys teams.
- 1 u18 girls team.
- 2 Senior men's teams

== History ==
The Ajax Wanderers Rugby Club can lay claim to being the founding club for rugby in post-war Ontario. The club was formed by a group of English immigrants who missed their favorite sport from back home in 1949. The early years saw games against the University of Toronto and McGill University. The Toronto Nomads, Aurora Barbarians, Markham Irish Canadians and to a lesser extent the Brantford Harlequins all owe their existence to those early Wanderers. Once a league was in place Wanderers became immediately successful winning several provincial championships in the late 1950s. The club also began a tradition of touring that continues to this day. Going on tour and hosting teams are one of the finest traditions in rugby and the sport provides an opportunity like no other for players to travel the world as a team or as individuals. Over the years Wanderers have toured extensively within Canada, the United States, Great Britain and even an occasional trip to the continent. The club has also hosted teams from all over the world. Developing players to play on the provincial, national and international stage has always been a priority and the Wanderers have provided players to the Canadian national team almost from its beginnings with John Ackerly representing his country in 1971 and that tradition has continued through the years with the likes of Karl Svoboda playing in the first three World Cups, and Dave Moonlight who is the leading points and try scorer for Canada in sevens. Wanderers have also welcomed players from around the globe to play with the club as they travel or on an exchange basis.

The Ajax Wanderers won the Ontario Senior Men's Championship in 1998. The club's women's team also ahcieved success during the 1990s, with several players going on to represent Canada at the national level. Despite being relegated twice in subsequent years, the men's team won Toronto Rugby Union (TRU) titles in 2004, 2006, 2009 and 2011. The club's second XV also won the TRU championship in 2007. In 2009, the Wanderers marked their 60th anniversary.[1]

The club is experiencing an upswing in its fortunes both for individuals and as an organization. With one of the facilities in the province, and a continual stream of up and coming players, the club continues to provide players to Ontario and Canada. John Moonlight and Kyle Armstrong are current members of the Men's National Program and several Wanderers have recently represented their country at U17 and U20 level. With the success of the Men's 1st XV, the club has seen itself, in 2011, win promotion back into the Ontario leagues for the first time in a decade.

In 2019, the Wanderers celebrated their 70th anniversary.

== Club achievements ==
- 1957 - Ontario champions
- 1967 - Quebec 7's winners
- 1968 - Windsor 7's winners
- 1968 - Ontario 7's winners
- 1974 - Ontario Summer Games Gold Medal
- 1984 - Ontario Summer Games Gold Medal
- 1985 - Ontario 7's winners (over 35s)
- 1987 - Ontario 7's winners (over 35s)
- 1989 - Ontario 7's winners (over 35s)
- 1990 - Ontario 7's winners (over 35s)
- 1994 - TRU Champions
- 1994 - TRU 3rds Champions
- 1995 - TRU 3rds Champions
- 1995 - ORU Women's Champions (undefeated all season)
- 1996 - ORU Women's Champions (undefeated all season)
- 1996 - Voted club of the year by Toronto Referees Society
- 1998 - McCormick Cup Winners
- 2006 - TRU Men's Champions
- 2007 - TRU A2 Men's Division Champions
- 2009 - TRU A1 Men's League Champions
- 2011 - TRU A1 Men's League Champions
- 2012 - Marshall Provincial 1st Division Champions
- 2012 - Marshall Provincial 2nd Division Champions

== Ontario Rugby Hall of Fame inductees ==
- 2006 - Mitchell, Malcolm 'Mac'
- 2006 - Kalra (Nee Russell), Helen
- 2006 - Moss, Ron
- 2001 - Hugh, James
- 2000 - Fowler, Arthur

== See also ==
- Ontario Rugby Union
- Rugby Canada
