= Stephanie White de Goede =

Canadian rugby union player

- Born: 1967 (age 58–59) 67 Ohio

Rugby union career
International career
Years	Team	Apps	(Points)
1987-1997	Canada	17	
National sevens team
Years	Team		Comps
1997	Canada		

Stephanie White (born 1967) was the first captain of the Canada women's national rugby union team in 1987, co-captained the national team at the first Women's Rugby World Cup in 1991, captained the team at the second World Cup in 1994, and also captained the first participating Canada women's national rugby sevens team in the Hong Kong Sevens invitational tournament in 1997.

== Rugby career ==
Between 1987 and 1997, she earned a total of 17 caps for the national team. She also served her community by building women's rugby in Canada alongside being a director of the Alberta Women's Rugby Union and a director of Women's Rugby on the Board of Directors for Alberta Rugby Football Union in the late 1980s. She also sat on the British Columbia Rugby Union Board of Directors, bringing the West Coast Women's Rugby Association into the BCRU in the early 2000s. As well, White was the Women's Players representative at the Rugby Canada Strategic Planning session in 1996 and served on the Rugby Canada Board of Directors from 2007 to 2013. White is also the Chairperson of the Monty Heald Fund which aimed to eliminate Pay to play for the senior women's team.

== Honours ==
She is recognized in the player category as a 2018 inductee of the Rugby Canada Hall of Fame alongside Ruth Hellerud-Brown (builder) and Maria Gallo (player). In 2017, she was given an Honorary Life Member award at the 2017 Rugby Canada Hall of Fame.

== Personal ==
Her husband Hans de Goede and their children, Sophie and Thyssen, have represented Canada at the national level. Her 2nd son Jacobus also plays rugby.
