= Wagner High School =

Wagner High School can refer to:

- Karen Wagner High School, San Antonio, Texas, United States
- Susan E. Wagner High School, Staten Island, New York, United States
- W.P. Wagner High School, Edmonton, Alberta, Canada
- Wagner High School (Clark Air Base), Philippines
