= Robbie Tice =

Canadian soccer player

- Tice with the Canadian Men's National Futsal Team, in 2012

Personal information
- Full name: William Robert Tice
- Date of birth: July 24, 1990 (age 36)
- Place of birth: White Rock, British Columbia, Canada
- Height: 5 ft 10 in (1.78 m)
- Position: Midfielder

Youth career
- Peace Arch SC
- 2004–2007: Vancouver Whitecaps FC
- 2008–2009: Ayr United FC

Senior career*
Years	Team	Apps	(Gls)
2006–2008	Peace Arch SC		
2008–2009	Ayr United FC		
2009–2010	Nantwich Town FC		
2010	Bodø/Glimt 2		
2011	Kjelsås		
2012	Nesodden ¨		
2013	Ocala Stampede		
2014	Washington Crossfire		
2015	Leknes		

International career
2012–	Canada Futsal	7	(0)
- * Club domestic league appearances and goals

Robbie Tice (born July 24, 1990) is a Canadian soccer player who most recently played for Norwegian club Leknes FK. Tice has played for clubs in Canada, Scotland, England, Norway and the USA. Tice has also represented the Canada men's national futsal team.

== Club career ==
=== Early career ===
Born in White Rock, British Columbia, Tice grew up playing for his local club Peace Arch SC. He also played for the Vancouver Whitecaps FC Academy (USL First Division). Tice played for the Vancouver Whitecaps FC youth teams at two Super Y-League North American Championships. In the 2006 edition, Tice scored 5 goals in 4 games for the club's U-16 team and was selected to the tournament All-Star team. Also in 2006, Tice played in the Northern Ireland Milk Cup as a guest player for the San Francisco Seals. As a 16-year-old, Tice played with Peace Arch SC in the PCSL (Pacific Coast Soccer League). In the summer of 2007, Tice joined Crewe Alexandra Football Club's Academy (League One, England) on a trial basis, before returning to Canada and continuing to play with Peace Arch SC.

=== Europe ===
Following his high school graduation, Tice returned to the UK, this time to Scotland. The 17-year-old, was immediately signed by Scottish Football League Second Division side Ayr United; after a short trial, where he featured mainly for the club’s U19 side during the 2008/2009 season.

In the summer of 2009, Tice returned to England to train with Crewe Alexandra FC and was recommended by them to neighbors Nantwich Town FC of the Northern Premier League. Tice played for the club during the 2009/2010 season, while also continuing to train with Crewe Alexandra FC weekly throughout the season.

At the conclusion of the season, Tice then headed to Norway, where he trialled for Adeccoligaen clubs Ranheim and FK Bodø/Glimt, signing for the latter in June 2010. Tice played for the club’s Reserve team, FK Bodø/Glimt 2.

In the middle of the 2011 season, Tice joined Kjelsås of the Norwegian Second Division. He made his debut for the first team on August 14, 2011, in a 3–1 win away to FK Mjølner.

Tice spent time during the 2012 pre-season on trial with Adeccoligaen clubs Strømmen IF and Ullensaker/Kisa IL, before signing for Norwegian Second Division club Nesodden IF on June 4.

=== North America ===
Tice returned to North America for the 2013 season. Tice was invited to attend the 2013 NASL Combine in Fort Lauderdale, Florida, where he scored 1 goal in 3 games.

Tice signed for USL Premier Development League Southeast Division side Ocala Stampede for the 2013 season. Tice made his full debut for the club in the Second Round of the Lamar Hunt US Open Cup, playing against USL Pro side Orlando City in a 2–1 loss. The following week Tice scored an 89th minute game-winning goal vs. IMG Academy and was named to the USL PDL "Team of the Week". Ocala went on to win the Southeast Division of the PDL, before falling in the PDL Conference Championships in the next round. Tice went on to score 3 goals in 15 games in all competitions for Ocala.

Tice spent time in early 2014 with German club VfR Garching and Austrian club SC Schwaz.

Tice joined USL Premier Development League side Washington Crossfire of the Northwest Division for the 2014 season. In 2015, Tice spent time on trial with Icelandic Premier League side Fjölnir. Tice also made two appearances for Icelandic First Division club BÍ/Bolungarvík, scoring one goal against KFR.

Following his stint in Iceland, Tice went on trial with Seattle Sounders FC 2 of the USL, the Reserve team of MLS club Seattle Sounders FC. Tice appeared in one pre-season game for the club, before returning to Europe.

=== Return to Europe ===
In August 2015, Tice joined Norwegian side Leknes FK. Tice made his debut against FK Lofoten in a 2–1 win for Leknes FK.

== International ==
Tice gained his first cap for the Canadian Men's National Futsal Team on June 23, 2012 in a friendly against Costa Rica, in San Jose, Costa Rica, followed by his second cap the next day, also against Costa Rica. The next week, Tice featured in the squad that beat El Salvador 7–6 on aggregate in a two-game playoff, securing Canada’s first ever appearance in the CONCACAF Futsal Championships. Tice played in all three of Canada’s group games at the 2012 CONCACAF Futsal Championships, in Guatemala City, Guatemala, playing against Guatemala, USA and Panama.

== Personal ==
Robbie Tice was born and raised in White Rock, BC, Canada and attended South Meridian Elementary School and Earl Marriott Secondary School. The youngest child of Sandra and Bill Tice; Robbie holds three passports: Canadian, British and American. In the summer of 2015 he married his wife Laura, in a wedding in White Rock.
