= Sophie de Goede =

Canada international rugby union player (born 1999)

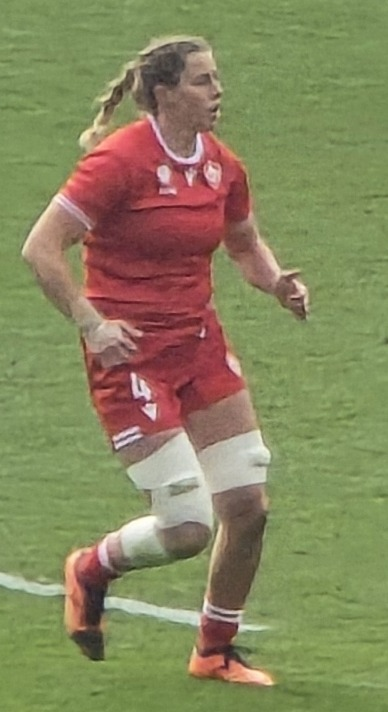
- 2025 Rugby World Cup in Twickenham Stadium
- Born: 30 June 1999 (age 27) Victoria, British Columbia
- Height: 1.83 m (6 ft 0 in)

Rugby union career
- Position: No. 8, Lock
- Current team: Saracens
Senior career
Years	Team	Apps	(Points)
2020–2021, 2023-	Saracens	5	(0)
International career
Years	Team	Apps	(Points)
2019–	Canada	41	(296)
Medal record
Women's rugby union
Representing Canada
World Cup
Silver medal – second place	2025 England	Team competition

Sophie Danielle Johanna de Goede (born 30 June 1999) is a Canadian rugby union player. She represents Canada internationally and currently plays for Saracens in Premiership Women's Rugby, previously known as Premier 15s. She captained Canada at the delayed 2021 Rugby World Cup in New Zealand and was named World Rugby Women's 15s Player of the Year in 2025. De Goede has proven to be an extremely versatile player, proficient in both the second and back rows, as well as being an excellent goalkicker.

== Early life and education ==
De Goede was born into a rugby family, being the daughter of former Canadian internationals Stephanie and Hans de Goede, who both captained their respective sides. de Goede was exposed to rugby from a young age, telling the Canadian Press in 2022 that she spent weekends at the James Bay Athletic Association clubhouse and playing mini rugby with Castaway Wanderers. Her older brother Thyssen has also represented Canada. In 2017, de Goede joined Queen's University and competed as a dual-sport athlete in rugby and basketball. That year, she was named U Sports' Rookie of the Year in rugby while also competing for Canada's sevens side at the Commonwealth Youth Games. In 2018 she won the U Sports' Player of the Year award, and was named OUA's Player of the Year in Women's Rugby three consecutive seasons starting in 2019.

In 2022, de Goede won the Lois and Doug Mitchell U Sports Athlete of the Year Award after she led Queen's University's Gaels women's rugby team to their first National championship and then helped the women's basketball team win bronze at the 2022 U Sports Women's Basketball Championship.

De Goede graduated from Queen's University with a degree in commerce but missed her graduation because she was competing at the 2022 Pacific Four Series in New Zealand. She led Canada for the first time as they beat the Eagles 36–5 in the first round of the series.

De Goede began an Executive Masters of Business Administration (EMBA) at the University of Cambridge in 2026.

== Rugby career ==
In 2019 de Goede earned her first senior cap for Canada, a loss to the Black Ferns in the Women's Super Series. De Goede joined Saracens in the Premier 15s after moving to London in 2020. She had been previously scouted by then-new Saracens coach Alex Austerberry while both were at a U18 tour involving Canada and Red Roses development sides. In 2021, She was awarded Player of the Match after Saracens defeated Loughborough Lightning in the Premier 15s semi-final.

De Goede was named Player of the Match after Canada defeated Italy in a warm-up match before the Rugby World Cup. She was named as captain of the Canadian team to the 2021 Rugby World Cup in New Zealand.

In 2023, She was named in Canada's squad for their test against the Springbok women and for the Pacific Four Series. She started in Canada's 66–7 thrashing of South Africa in Madrid, Spain. She scored her sides first try in their Pacific Four match against the Black Ferns at Ottawa.

In July 2025, she was named in the Canadian side to the Rugby World Cup in England. Shining at the 2025 Women’s Rugby World Cup, she was one of three nominees for and subsequently named World Rugby Player of the year at the 2025 Women’s Rugby World Cup.

In May 2026, de Goede returned to action with Saracens for the first time since October 2025 after spending significant time playing with Canada internationally.
