= BCRU =

BCRU may refer to:

- Bath Cancer Research Unit, a cancer research association in Bath, England
- British Columbia Rugby Union, the provincial administrative body for rugby union in British Columbia
