= Helen Russell (writer) =

English writer

Helen Russell is an English author, journalist, and speaker based in Denmark. She has written for The Guardian, The Daily Telegraph, The Observer, Stylist, Metro, Grazia, and The Independent. She has published five books, including the bestselling The Year of Living Danishly (2015).

== Career ==
Russell has previously worked for The Sunday Times, Take a Break, AllAboutYou.com., Top Sante, Tatler Asia, Grazia India and Sky. She joined Marie Claire as editor of marieclaire.co.uk in 2010 and was BSME-shortlisted in 2011 and 2012.

After relocating to Jutland, Denmark, Russell wrote The Year of Living Danishly, exploring why Denmark is considered one of the happiest countries in the world. The book is an international bestseller and has been published in 21 countries.

After publishing The Year of Living Danishly, Russell continued to study cultural approaches to emotions and subsequently has published Leap Year (2016), The Atlas of Happiness (2018), and How To Be Sad (2021). In 2018, she published her first fiction book Gone Viking.

Russell continues to write for magazines and newspapers around the world, including Stylist, The Times, Grazia, Metro, and The Wall Street Journal. She wrote a column for The Telegraph, and is a correspondent for The Guardian.

She speaks regularly about her work for organisations including Lego, Google, Carlsberg, Action for Happiness and is a TEDx speaker.

== Bibliography ==
=== Non-fiction ===
- The Year of Living Danishly: Uncovering the Secrets of the World’s Happiest Country (2015)
- Leap Year: How small steps can make a giant difference (2016)
- The Atlas of Happiness: The Global Secrets of How to Be Happy (2019)
- How to Be Sad: Everything I've Learned About Getting Happier by Being Sad (2021)
- How to Raise a Viking: the Secrets of Parenting the World's Happiest Children (2024)

=== Fiction ===
- Gone Viking (2018)

== Podcast ==
In 2021 Russell started her own podcast series, How to be Sad, in which Russell interviews guests who discuss how we handle our emotions and the struggles of modern life. The first episode featured Ella Millis of Deliciously Ella, and subsequent interviewees have included Mo Gawdat, Holly Tucker, Sophie Walker, and Mitch Albom.

== Links ==
Official website
