= Karl Svoboda (rugby union) =

Canada international rugby union player

- Born: March 23, 1962 (age 64) Belleville, Ontario

Rugby union career
- Position: Hooker
Amateur team(s)
Years	Team	Apps	(Points)
-1985	Belleville Bulldogs		
1981-1985	University of Toronto		
Senior career
Years	Team	Apps	(Points)
1985-1996	Ajax Wanderers R.U.F.C.		
1996	Oxford University RFC		
1996	Penguins Rugby Club		
International career
Years	Team	Apps	(Points)
1985-1995	Canada	24	(0)

Karl Franklin Svoboda (born March 23, 1962, in Belleville, Ontario) is a Canadian former rugby union footballer of Czech descent. Svoboda began his rugby career as the Belleville Bulldogs hooker and then played representative rugby with the Ontario Junior XV. In 1981 he scored a try in the final of the Canada Summer Games. He then played with the Ontario Senior Men's Rugby XV, captaining many of the games. Two notable victories came in the national championship over the British Columbia Provincial XV in 1982 and 1995. In 1995, the Ontario Provincial Rugby Team, with Svoboda as captain, was named co-winners of the Ontario Provincial Team of the Year, along with the Toronto Blue Jays.

Svoboda also captained Canada for two Test matches in 1993, the most notable being the victory over an England XV. During this same year, Svoboda's brother Paul captained the Canadian National Rugby League Team.

Svoboda played in the first three Rugby World Cups (1987, 1991, 1995), and amassed a total of 24 International Caps between the years 1985–1995. He went on to play for Oxford University at the dawn of the professional rugby era in 1995, gaining his full rugby Blue. Svoboda also gained a Blue at Oxford by playing defense in ice hockey during the Varsity match against Cambridge University in 1996. He also played for the Penguin International RFC, touring Hungary and the Czech Republic with them in 1996.

Svoboda now resides in Whitby, Ontario, where he coaches rugby for his high school team (Sinclair Secondary School) and for the mini program at his home rugby club, the Ajax Wanderers. Since then has moved back to coaching the club where it all started (Belleville Bulldogs Senior Men’s)
