= Hans de Goede =

Canada international rugby union player

- Born: Hans de Goede; February 13, 1953 (age 73) Amsterdam, Netherlands
- School: Victoria High School

Rugby union career
- Position: Lock
Amateur team(s)
Years	Team	Apps	(Points)
1971-1987	Vancouver Island Crimson Tide	25	
Senior career
Years	Team	Apps	(Points)
1971-1978	James Bay AA		
1978-1979	Cardiff RFC	30	(8)
1979-1987	James Bay AA		
Provincial / State sides
Years	Team	Apps	(Points)
1972-1987	British Columbia		
International career
Years	Team	Apps	(Points)
1974-1987	Canada	24	(5)

Hans de Goede (born 13 February 1953, in Amsterdam) is a Dutch-born Canadian former rugby union player who played as lock.

== Career ==
Before his rugby career, de Goede practiced football, playing three games for Victoria Dolphins. Later, at Central Junior High School, he started playing rugby. He later started his club career leading Vic High team to the final of the Howard Russell Cup in 1971. Later he played for James Bay Athletic Association, where he would play for 20 years. He also played for BC Bears at provincial level, of which he was captain, 30 matches for Cardiff RFC in Wales and for Vancouver Island Crimson Tide at regional level between 1972 and 1987. As rugby union was an amateur sport at the time, de Goede earned extra money at "You Think You're Tough?" boxing tournaments. On 25 October 1974, de Goede was first capped for Canada in the match against Tonga in Vancouver. He was also present in the 1987 Rugby World Cup Canada squad, of which he was the captain, playing all the three matches in the tournament, with the match against Wales in Invercargill being his last cap. de Goede played twice for World XV, in 1976 and in 1980. He was inducted to the BC Sports Hall of Fame in 1996.

== Personal life ==
He married Stephanie White de Goede, who was Canada women's national rugby union team first captain. He is also the father of Jacob de Goede, of James Bay AA, Thyssen de Goede, who is also a rugby union player for James Bay AA and previously Canada and of Sophie de Goede, who plays for the Canada women's national rugby union team.
