= Bayside Sharks =

- Full name: Bayside Sharks Rugby Football Club
- Union: Vancouver Rugby Union
- Founded: 1988
- Location: White Rock, British Columbia
- Ground(s): South Surrey Athletic Park
- League(s): BC Division 1
- 2018-19: Champions
1st kit	2nd kit

Official website
- www.baysiderfc.com

Bayside Rugby Football Club (nicknamed Bayside Sharks) is a Canadian rugby union club that is based in White Rock, British Columbia. Established in 1988, the club regularly competes in the top division of British Columbia rugby and has contributed many players to representative teams at the provincial as well as international level. The club played in the British Columbia Premiership for the 2012-13 season.

== History ==
The Bayside Sharks Rugby Football Club was born through the merging of the Tsawwassen and Semiahmoo Old Boys (SOB'S) rugby clubs in 1988. Since that time the club has found themselves in the British Columbia Premiership final twice, unfortunately coming out empty handed both times. The Sharks won promotion to the premier division of British Columbia rugby for the 2012-13 season despite a 36-24 loss against Vancouver Rowing Club in the 2011-12 BC League One final. The Club's President is currently Geoff Cutler. The club fields 3 Senior Men's teams, Women's Division 1, U-19 Boys & Girls, U-16 Boys & Girls and U-14 Boys & Girls teams.

== Facilities ==
The club play their home games at South Surrey Athletic Park.

== Titles ==
- Rounsefell Cup: 0
