= Ruth Hellerud-Brown =

Canadian rugby union player

Ruther Hellerud-Brown
- Born: September 22, 1957 (age 69)
- Height: 1.65 m (5 ft 5 in)
- Weight: 66 kg (146 lb; 10 st 6 lb)
- University: University of British Columbia

Rugby union career
- Position: Flank
Provincial / State sides
Years	Team	Apps	(Points)
–	Alberta		
-	Saskatchewan		
-	British Columbia		
International career
Years	Team	Apps	(Points)
1979-?	Canada	11	

Ruth Hellerud-Brown (born September 22, 1957) is a Canadian former rugby union player. She captained the Canadian team at the inaugural 1991 Rugby World Cup in Wales.

== Background ==
Hellrud-Brown studied dietetics at the University of British Columbia. She first started playing the game in 1979 and played an important role in the Women's rugby union in Canada. Her contribution and impact on the sport are recognized in naming the British Columbia Rugby Union Senior Women's premier competition in her name.

In 2018, she was inducted in the Rugby Canada Hall of Fame in the builder category.

== Rugby career ==
Hellerud-Brown was a member of the first Canada women's national rugby union team in 1987 and earned 11 caps, having captained the team nine times. She played provincial rugby for Alberta, Saskatchewan, and British Columbia.

Hellerud-Brown was the Canadian captain in the 1991 Women's Rugby World Cup.
