= Vancouver Rogues =

- Full name: Vancouver Rogues Rugby Club
- Unions: Rugby Canada; Vancouver Rugby Union; IGR
- Founded: 2002 (Restarted 2021)
- Region: British Columbia Rugby Union
- Ground: Connaught Park
- President: Lorcan O'Donnell
- Coach: Sergio Salgado Sanchez

Official website
- blog.rogues-rugby.ca

The Vancouver Rogues is a rugby union team based in Vancouver, British Columbia, Canada. It's inclusive to players of all sexual orientations and gender identities and is part of the IGR. In 2022 the team participated in the Bingham Cup and was the top Canadian Team that participated.

== History ==
The Vancouver Rogues were originally established in 2002 and was the first openly gay and inclusive rugby team in Canada. The original team ran for 10 years before dissolving. In 2021 the team was revived to continue where the original team left off and to promote inclusiveness in the sport. The Team has partnered with the Meraloma Rugby Club and is registered as their 2nd team in their 3rd Division men's team.

== Gallery ==
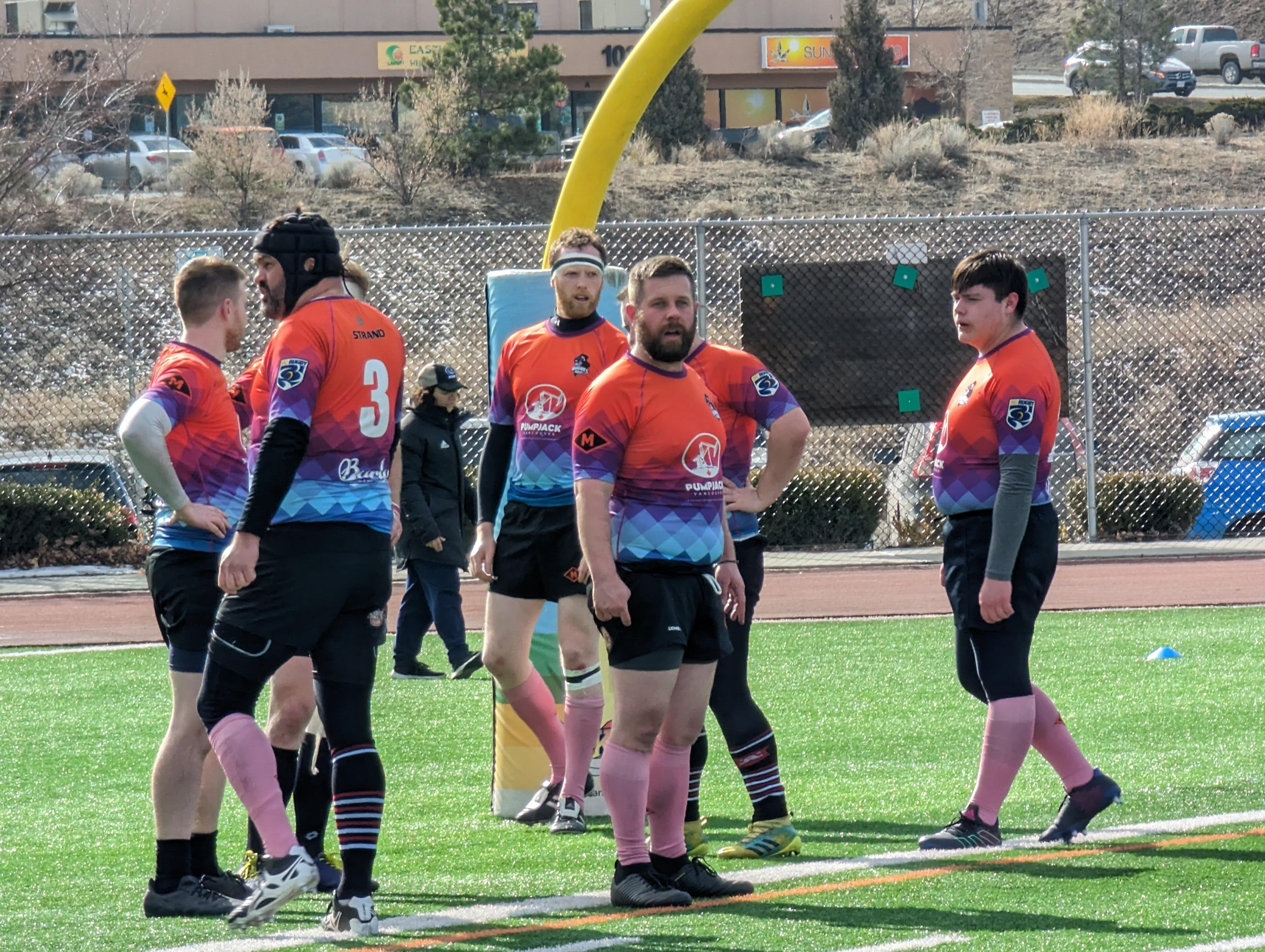

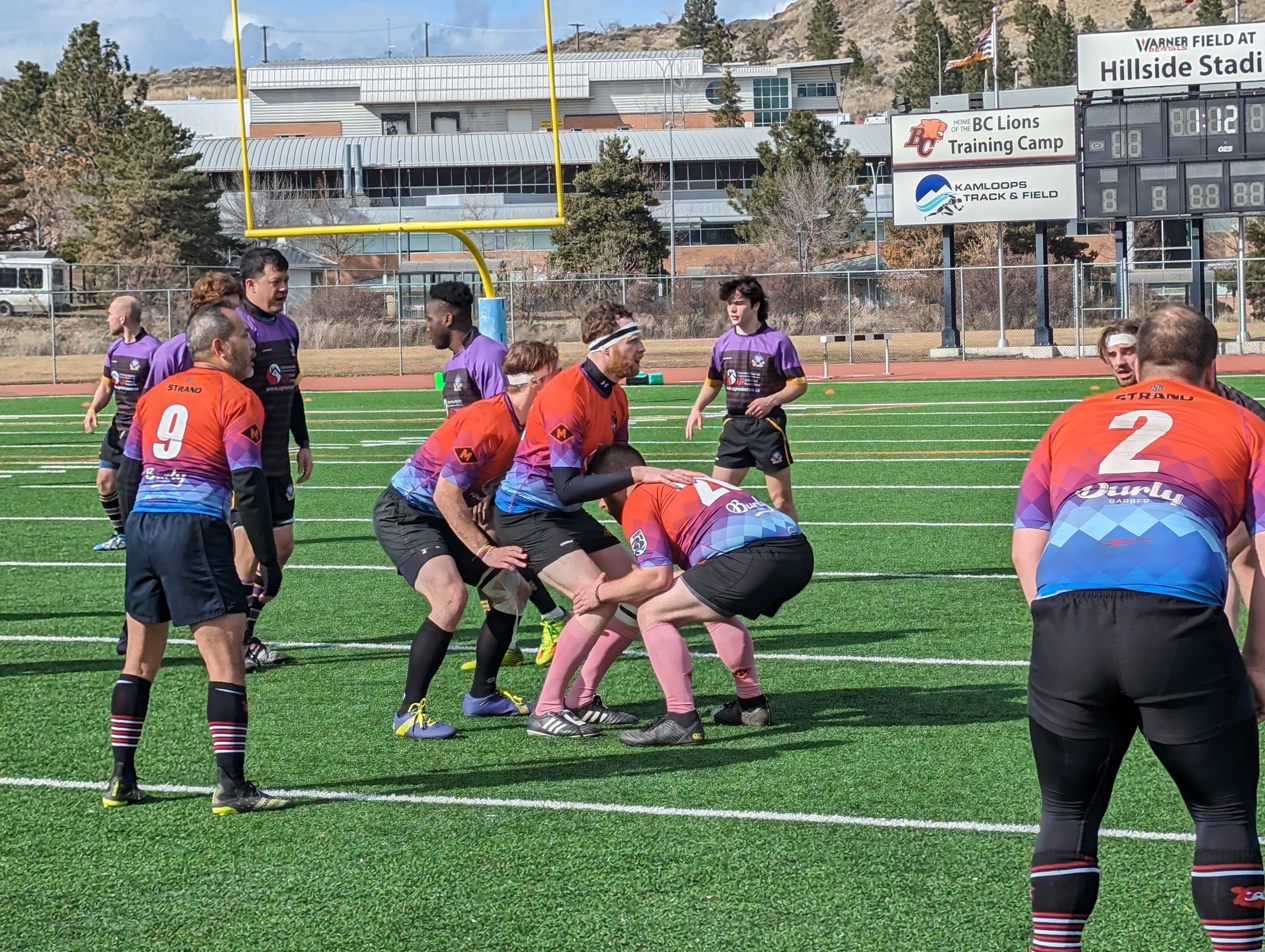

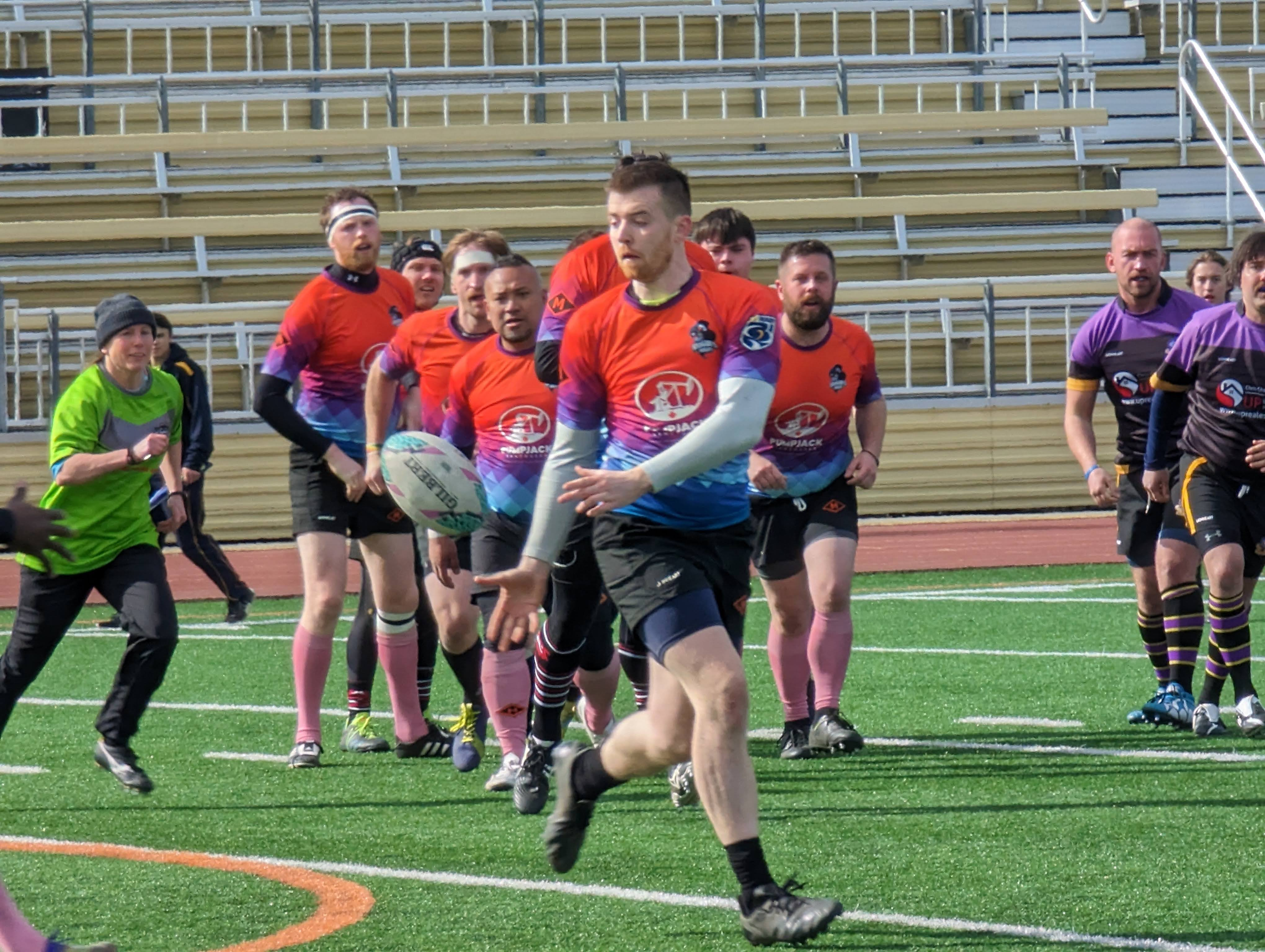

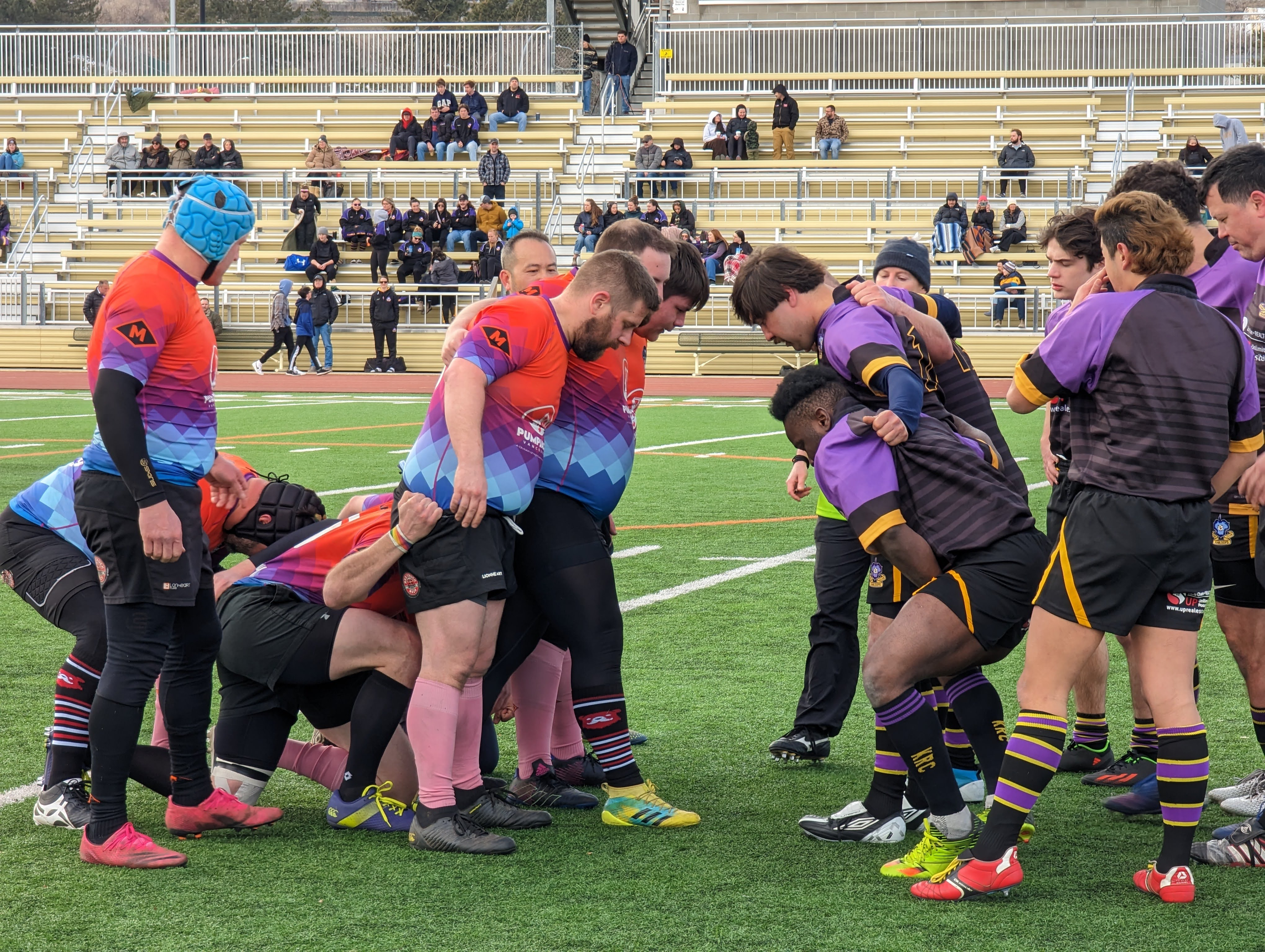
