= Helen Russell (rugby union) =

Canadian rugby union player

Helen Kalra
- Born: Helen Russell; November 6, 1964 (age 62) Scarborough, Ontario
- Height: 1.68 m (5 ft 6 in)
- Weight: 66 kg (146 lb)
- University: University of Guelph
- Occupation: Consultant

Rugby union career
- Position: Hooker
Amateur team(s)
Years	Team	Apps	(Points)
1983?-1987?	Guelph Gryphons		
1990?-1996?	Ajax Wanderers		
Provincial / State sides
Years	Team	Apps	(Points)
–	Ontario		
International career
Years	Team	Apps	(Points)
1990-1996	Canada	10	

Helen Kalra (née Russell) is a Canadian rugby union player. She represented Canada at the 1991 and 1994 Women's Rugby World Cup.

== Rugby ==
Russell was the first female student to play for the Men's University of Guelph Rugby team in 1985 when she suited up for a match against Wilfrid Laurier University.

She was known for her crushing tackles and powerful rucking. Russell was a member of the Ontario team for four years and was inducted into the Ontario Rugby Hall of Fame in 2006. She retired as a captain of the national team.

== Achievements ==
- Captain of Team Quebec
- Captain of Team Ontario
- Captain of Team Canada
- 2006, Ontario Rugby Hall of Fame inductee
- EORU women's league competition named in her honour

== Personal life ==
Russell's father, John Russell, emigrated to Canada from England in 1957, and over the course of a six decade involvement in the rugby community, he joined Ottawa's first rugby club - the Ottawa Beavers, became the founding president of the Ottawa Indians RFC, established the Bytown Blues RFC, was the first president of the Ottawa Area Rugby Association, was one of eight founding members of Twin Elm Rugby Park, served on the Canadian Rugby Union board for a decade, and inducted in the Rugby Ontario and Twin Elm Rugby Park Hall of Fall.

Russell studied human biology with a biomedical minor at the University of Guelph (1982-1987). She worked in pharma for over twenty years, starting as a sale representative and rose to marketing director for the gastrointestinal franchise at AstraZeneca Canada, Inc. Russell now works for Pangaea Consultants as an Associate Managing Director with an expertise in channel marketing and strategic insights and resourcing.
