= The NAGs Players =

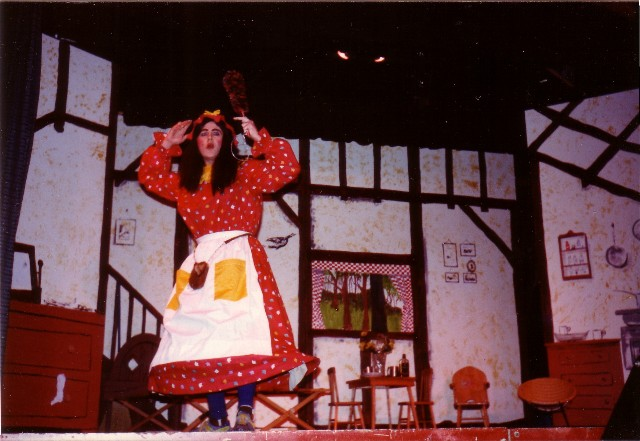
A photo from NAGs' 1982 Production of Snow White.

The NAGs Players are an amateur theatre company based in Toronto, Ontario. The company was founded in 1976 by Nomads Rugby Club players. The company is active today putting on three annual shows, one of which is always a pantomime.

== History ==
In 1976, a few Nomad rugby players were drinking at the Tranzac Club. Discussion moved on from the Nomads' latest performance on the pitch to acting and the plays they had done back home and the Nomads Acting Group (NAGs) was born. The Nomads put on their first performances of "Cupid is a Bum, Is a Bum, Is a Bum" and "Meet the Folks" on April Fools' Day, 1976 at the Tranzac. The plays were a huge success. So great in fact, the NAGs decided to continue putting on shows year after year.

== NAGs Today ==
These days the NAGs put on a British-style pantomime (both children's matinees and "big children" nights with a bar) in February, and a spring and fall show, all of which are still held at the Tranzac club in the Annex. You will still find the odd Nomad player taking part in the shows and if not on stage, then you are sure to find them in the audience.
