= Capilano RFC =

Canadian rugby union team, based in West Vancouver, British Columbia

- Full name: Capilano Rugby Football Club
- Union: Vancouver Rugby Union
- Founded: 1969; 56 years ago
- Location: West Vancouver, British Columbia
- Ground(s): Klahanie Park
- League(s): BC Premier League
- 2018-19: 10th
1st kit	2nd kit

Official website
- www.capilanorfc.com

The Capilano Rugby Football Club is a Canadian rugby union team based in West Vancouver, British Columbia. The Capilano Rugby Football Club currently play in the British Columbia Premiership and have won the BC Premier Championship three times.

== History ==
The Capilano Rugby Football Club is the product of the amalgamation of two rugby clubs, the North Shore All-Blacks and the West Vancouver Barbarians, in 1969. Before the merger the North Shore All-Blacks were dominant in the 1930s capturing the British Columbia championship six successive seasons (1933 to 1935, 1937, 1948, and 1955). The Capilanos continue to be a strong contender in the modern era winning three championships of their own in 2004 and 2005. Most recently, the Capilanos defeated James Bay Athletic Association 22-21 in the 2011-12 BC Premiership final to win their third provincial championship as the Capilano Rugby Football Club.

== Facilities ==
In 1982 a deal was struck with West Vancouver to designate Klahanie Park the home of North Shore Rugby and continues to be the home ground of the Capilano RFC.

== Titles ==
- Rounsefell Cup: 3

2004, 2005, 2012

== Club Presidents ==
- 1969 – 1971 Bill Ewing
- 1971 – 1975 Bucky Ellison
- 1975 – 1977 Jeremy Dalton
- 1977 – 1979 Kevin Davies
- 1979 – 1983 Robin Dyke
- 1983 – 1984 Eric Cable
- 1984 – 1987 Iain Sellers
- 1987 – 1991 Tony Scott
- 1991 – 1994 John Olmstead
- 1994 – 1996 Eric Carlson
- 1996 – 1999 Mark Slay
- 1999 – 2002 Tony Scott
- 2002 – 2006 Alan Snowden
- 2006 – 2009 Steve Cook
- 2009 – 2014 Ken Robinson
- 2014 – 2016 Kes Kasha
- 2016 – Present Nick Belmar

== Honorary Life Members ==
- George Wilson
- Bill Duncan
- Dick Hallaway
- Bob Leevers
- Alex Mahood
- Bucky Ellison
- Jim Morris
- Brian Seed
- Bob Spray
- Jeremy Dalton
- Kevin Davies
- Gary Lynas
- Robin Dyke
- Ozzie Gjerdalen
- Denny Maynard
- Glyn Jones
- Iain Sellars
- Tony Scott
- Noel Larkin
- Dean Massie
- Alan Codyre
- Roger Hatch
- Bob Michael
- Mark Slay
- Tim Murdy
- Maurice Michaud
- Paul Timperley
- Bill Ewing
- Eric Carlson
- Alan Snowden
- Steve Cook
- Bob Bowman
- Ken Robinson
- John Langley
