= Holly Tucker =

British entrepreneur and small business advocate

Holly Tucker MBE
- Born: March 29, 1977 (age 48)
- Occupations: Entrepreneur, author, podcast host, television presenter
- Known for: Founding Notonthehighstreet and Holly & Co
- Awards: MBE

Holly Lee Tucker MBE (born 29 March 1977) is a British entrepreneur, small-business advocate, author, podcast host, and television presenter. She co-founded the online marketplace Notonthehighstreet.com in 2006 and later founded Holly & Co, a purpose-led company supporting independent businesses that became a certified B Corporation in 2022. She presents the ITV daytime series Be Your Own Boss, hosts the weekly interview podcast Conversations of Inspiration and wrote the bestselling Do What You Love, Love What You Do. Tucker was appointed MBE in 2013 for services to small businesses and, in 2015, was named one of the UK Prime Minister's Business Ambassadors for creative small businesses.

== Career ==
Tucker began her career in advertising at Publicis London before launching a series of local fairs, including the Chiswick Christmas Fair, that inspired her to co-found Notonthehighstreet.com with Sophie Cornish in 2006.

In 2017 she founded Holly & Co, an advice platform and online marketplace designed to support independent founders and promote purpose-driven shopping. Tucker positions the company as a vehicle for sharing her two decades of business experience and helping creators build enterprises aligned with personal values and long-term purpose. As part of this approach, Holly & Co enables “shop by values” via founder and product badges (for example, Female Founded, B Corp Certified, Made in the UK) developed with the diversity consultancy The Other Box to help customers filter purchases by their values.

== Campaigns and advocacy ==
Through Campaign Shop Independent, Tucker has led several UK initiatives encouraging consumers to support local and creative businesses:

- Colour Friday (launched 2020) — an annual alternative to Black Friday encouraging shoppers to buy from independent retailers.
- Female Founders Month (held each March) — a month-long celebration spotlighting women-led businesses around International Women's Day.

During the COVID-19 pandemic, she launched SME:SOS, a free daily livestream and podcast-style series connecting small businesses with experts and mentors; the series is available as a YouTube playlist of expert interviews.

Holly & Co also created the Independent Awards, which offered an annual prize pot of £100,000 divided between the winners to support small enterprises.

== Media ==
Television

In October 2025 Tucker began presenting the ITV daytime factual series Be Your Own Boss, produced by True North Productions in association with Royal Mail. The programme features her advising founders on how to improve and scale their businesses. It premiered on ITV1 on 19 October 2025 and is also available on ITVX.

Podcast

Tucker hosts the weekly interview podcast Conversations of Inspiration, launched in 2018 by Holly & Co, featuring entrepreneurs and creatives discussing their journeys. As of 2025, more than 230 episodes have been published.

== Books ==
- Build a Business From Your Kitchen Table (Simon & Schuster, 2012) — ISBN 978-1471102110
- Shape Up Your Business (Simon & Schuster, 2014) — ISBN 978-1471102141
- Do What You Love, Love What You Do (Virgin Books, 2021) — a Sunday Times bestseller.

== Honours and recognition ==
- Member of the Order of the British Empire (MBE) — for services to small businesses and enterprise (2013).
- UK Prime Minister's Business Ambassador — creative small businesses (2015).
- Google Award for Women in Digital (Digital Masters Awards, 2014).
- EY Entrepreneur of the Year (UK) — regional finalist (2014).
- Management Today “35 Women Under 35” (2009).

== Personal life ==
Tucker has one son, Harry. She has spoken about her experience with Dyslexia and advocates for using creativity as a source of strength in business. She frequently writes about entrepreneurship as a means to create “the good life” — combining purpose, creativity and community impact.
