= Thyssen de Goede =

Canada international rugby union player

- Born: June 24, 1988 (age 38)
- Height: 6 ft 4 in (193 cm)
- Weight: 200 lb (91 kg)
- School: Georges P. Vanier Secondary School
- Notable relative(s): Hans de Goede (father); Stephanie de Goede (mother); Sophie de Goede (sister)

Rugby union career
- Position: Flanker / No. 8
International career
Years	Team	Apps	(Points)
2015	Canada	2	(0)

Thyssen de Goede (born June 24, 1988) is a Canadian former international rugby union player.

A native of Victoria, British Columbia, de Goede is of Dutch descent and comes from a rugby playing family, with his father Hans and mother Stephanie both captaining Canada at Rugby World Cups. His younger sister Sophie is also a Canadian representative player. He was educated at Georges P. Vanier Secondary School.

A back-row forward, de Goede started playing rugby with his school team at age 15 and represented Canada at the 2008 IRB Junior World Championship. He had several years with the Canada rugby sevens team, including an appearance at the 2010 Commonwealth Games in Delhi. In 2015, de Goede debuted for the Canada XV as the blindside flanker against Japan at the 2015 Pacific Nations Cup and was capped a second time off the bench against Samoa later in the tournament.

== See also ==
- List of Canada national rugby union players
