= South Surrey Athletic Park =

Park in British Columbia, Canada

- Interactive map of South Surrey Athletic Park
- Type: Municipal
- Location: South Surrey, British Columbia
- Coordinates: 49.04083°N 122.81549°W
- Operator: City of Surrey

South Surrey Athletic Park is a popular recreational park in the White Rock/South Surrey community. The park is bound by 18th avenue to the south, 148th street to the east, 24th avenue to the North and Sunnyside Urban Acres Forest to the west.

The park has three baseball diamonds, an indoor baseball training facility, tennis and volleyball courts, a number of grass and artificial turf soccer fields and an outdoor red urethane oval track. There are also four multi-purpose fields adjacent to Semiahmoo Secondary School that are commonly used for football, rugby and soccer. The park also has a skateboarding facility, an outdoor waterpark, a mountain bike park, a youth community centre and a Rotary Field house.

South Surrey Athletic Park is home to two large establishments: Softball City, a softball complex with four diamonds that is host to the annual Canada Cup international women's fastpitch tournament, and South Surrey Arena, a hockey arena that is home to the South Surrey Eagles.

Many other local teams play (or played) their home games at South Surrey Athletic Park, including: The White Rock Tritons of the B.C. Premier Baseball League, the Big Kahuna Rams, the Peace Arch Soccer Club, Coastal Football Club, and the Surrey Beavers and Bayside Sharks of the BC Rugby League.

Scenes from the 1998 film Air Bud: Golden Receiver were shot at South Surrey Athletic Park.
