= British Columbia Rugby Hall of Fame =

Coordinates: 49.2991°N 123.1245°W

The British Columbia Rugby Hall of Fame, set in Vancouver, British Columbia, Canada, is a Hall of Fame created in 2005 to honour those who have contributed to the development of the sport of rugby union in Canada in British Columbia.
