= Meraloma Rugby =

Canadian rugby union club, based in Vancouver

(Canada) Meraloma Club
- Full name: Meraloma Athletic Club
- Union: Vancouver Rugby Union
- Founded: 1923
- Location: Vancouver, British Columbia
- Ground: Connaught Park
- League: BC Premier League
- 2018-19: 12th
1st kit	2nd kit

Official website
- www.meralomarugby.com

Meraloma Club (nicknamed the Lomas) is a Canadian rugby union team based in Vancouver, British Columbia. Founded in 1923, The Meraloma Club originated as a swim club before branching out with an array of other sports including rugby. The rugby club currently competes in the British Columbia Premier Rugby League.

== History ==
Established in 1923 as a swim club, the Meraloma Club was originally named the Mermaid Athletic Club before adding Canadian football, rugby union and other sports. With the inclusion of new sports came the development of a new name. By taking "Mer" from the original Mermaids name and adding "al" from alpha, "om" from omega (the first and last letters of the Greek alphabet) and "a" from "always" that was interpreted to mean "Mermaids, first, last and always"; reflected in the club motto "Once a Meraloma, always a Meraloma". Thus, the Mermaid Athletic Club became the Meraloma Club.

The Rugby Section of the Meraloma Club has had tremendous success, both on a team and individual level, with numerous premiership titles for the club. Players for the Meralomas also compete at both the provincial and national Levels. The Meralomas most recent Rounsefell Cup win came in 2009. The team also managed to make it to the 2011 B.C. Rugby Premier League final but eventually lost out to Castaway Wanderers RFC by a score of 20–3.

Women's sports returned to the club in 1973 after a 45-year absence, at first in the form of field hockey and eventually soccer, basketball, volleyball, touch football and rugby. The club currently has over 600 active male and female members in six sport sections. Over half the members of the Meraloma Club are involved in rugby.

In 2021 the Rugby Club added the Vancouver Rogues as their second team in their third division men's team. It is inclusive to players of all sexual orientations and gender identities and is part of International Gay Rugby. In 2022 the team participated in the Bingham Cup and was the top Canadian team that participated.

The Meraloma club fields teams in every BCRU senior division except for Women's Division Two Tier 1.

== Facilities ==
The Meraloma Club is housed in a 1923 parks and recreation vintage structure, on Connaught Park, Kitsilano, which it continues to renovate and maintain. A heritage award from the City of Vancouver was earned in 1979 for preserving architectural integrity during renovations.

== Other sports ==
=== Field hockey ===
The Meraloma Club participates in the Vancouver Women's Field Hockey Association. They field three teams, one in Division One, one in Division Three and one in Division Four. The field hockey department of Meraloma dates back to 1974.

=== Cricket ===
The Meraloma cricket club participates in the British Columbia Mainland Cricket League, and is one of the most successful teams in the competition. The club also provides teams for women and junior players.

=== Fastpitch softball ===
In existence since the early 1970s, the women's fastpitch softball section of the club currently runs two teams. The Lomas play in the VWFL, while the Diamond M's play in the VWRSL, and is focused more as a development team. The Lomas have won the VWFL title six times, and gold in provincials twice, in 2003 and 2010. They participated in the 2009 World Master's in Australia, finishing fifth, and in Turin in 2013, where they won silver.

=== Soccer ===
Eight teams make up the Meraloma's soccer department, evenly split into four men's and four women's teams. The club participates in the Vancouver Metro Soccer League and Metro Women's Soccer League respectively.

=== Touch rugby ===
Meraloma runs the only touch rugby club in Vancouver that is affiliated with the Federation of International Touch (FIT).

=== Road cycling ===
The Meraloma road cycling team will participate in its 12th season in 2026.

== Former teams ==
=== Football (Gridiron) ===
From 1926 to 1938, the Meralomas football team participated in the British Columbia Rugby Football Union and the Western Canada Rugby Football Union. Despite the names of the competitions, the team played Canadian football rather than rugby union. The Lomas were very successful in their time, winning five BCRFU championships in just 13 years. In the final season before the senior team folded, the team failed to win a single game, finishing 0–8, scoring only 3 points and conceding 115.

The club continued to run as a junior football club past the 1930s, later joining the Canadian Junior Football League when it was formed in 1974. In 1990, the team relocated to Coquitlam, and was renamed to the Coquitlam-Meralomas Bulldogs. Three years later the name changed again to the Tri-City Bulldogs, ending any mention of the Meraloma Club in the team's name. The Bulldogs folded in 2004.

When the BC Lions joined the Western Interprovincial Football Union in 1954, which become the Western Conference of the Canadian Football League four years later, they adopted colours very similar to the former Meraloma club.

The football section of Meraloma was officially inducted into the BC Football Hall of Fame in 2016.

== Titles ==
Rounsefell Cup: 13

- 1929
- 1939
- 1941
- 1954
- 1965
- 1967
- 1972
- 1973
- 1983
- 1986
- 1987
- 1988
- 2009
