= Stephanie A. White =

American neuroscientist

Stephanie Ann White
- Education: Connecticut College; Stanford University
- Scientific career
- Workplaces: Duke University; University of California, Los Angeles
- Thesis: Social control of gonadotropin-releasing hormone gene expression (1997)
- Website: White Lab

Stephanie Ann White is an American neuroscientist who is a professor at the University of California, Los Angeles. Her research looks to understand how social interactions impact the brain. She serves as Director of the Neural Systems and Behavior programme at the Marine Biological Laboratory.

== Early life and education ==
White was an undergraduate student at Connecticut College, where she majored in biopsychology. She was a graduate student at Stanford University, where she studied neuroscience. Her research considered social control of the expression of gonadotropin-releasing hormones. She became interested in neuropathological approaches to study how socialising impacts the shape of the brain. She moved to Duke University as a postdoctoral scholar where she remained from 1997 until 2000.

== Research and career ==
White joined University of California, Los Angeles in 2000 and holds the William Scheibel Endowed Chair in Neuroscience.

She has used songbirds to better understand how the environment influences creativity and learning. During a critical developmental period, the songbirds develop a suitable song for courtship, primarily via trial and error. In particular, she considers the zebra finch, whose behavior and neural circuitry are sexually dimorphic.

White has studied FOXP2, a gene related to speech, in the learning of both humans and songbirds. White has investigated the role of FOXP2 during birdsong as well as its prevalence in neural synapses. She has shown that disruption to the FOXP2 gene can cause difficulties in speech and birdsong. In zebra finches she identified that the FOXP1 gene is at elevated in parts of the brain associated with birdsong. White identified several genes associated with difficulties in human development in the basal ganglia of the zebra finch, and has since used songbirds as a model for human speech disorders. She has argued that this understanding will help to identify therapeutic candidates for communication-related conditions such as autism.

== Selected publications ==
- Anton Reiner; David J Perkel; Laura L Bruce; et al. (31 May 2004). "Revised nomenclature for avian telencephalon and some related brainstem nuclei". The Journal of Comparative Neurology. 473 (3): 377–414. doi:10.1002/cne.20118. ISSN 0021-9967. PMC 2518311. PMID 15116397. Wikidata Q22337412.
- Erich D. Jarvis; Onur Güntürkün; Laura Bruce; et al. (February 2005). "Avian brains and a new understanding of vertebrate brain evolution". Nature Reviews Neuroscience. 6 (2): 151–9. doi:10.1038/nrn1606. ISSN 1471-003X. PMC 2507884. PMID 15685220. Wikidata Q22337223.
- Ikuko Teramitsu; Lili C Kudo; Sarah E London; Daniel H Geschwind; Stephanie A White (1 March 2004). "Parallel FoxP1 and FoxP2 expression in songbird and human brain predicts functional interaction". The Journal of Neuroscience. 24 (13): 3152–3163. doi:10.1523/jneurosci.5589-03.2004. ISSN 0270-6474. PMC 6730014. PMID 15056695. Wikidata Q29618801.
- White, Stephanie A.; Nguyen, Tuan; Fernald, Russell D. (2002-09-01). "Social regulation of gonadotropin-releasing hormone". Journal of Experimental Biology. 205 (17): 2567–2581. doi:10.1242/jeb.205.17.2567. ISSN 0022-0949. PMID 12151363.
- White, S. A.; Kasten, T. L.; Bond, C. T.; Adelman, J. P.; Fernald, R. D. (1995-08-29). "Three gonadotropin-releasing hormone genes in one organism suggest novel roles for an ancient peptide". Proceedings of the National Academy of Sciences. 92 (18): 8363–8367. Bibcode:1995PNAS...92.8363W. doi:10.1073/pnas.92.18.8363. ISSN 0027-8424. PMC 41157. PMID 7667296.
