= Peace Arch SC =

- Full name: Peace Arch Soccer Club
- Founded: 2007
- Ground: South Surrey Athletic Park
- Chairman: Bill Tice
- Manager: Mark McQueen
- League: Pacific Coast Soccer League
- 2008: 8th
| Home colours | Away colours |

Peace Arch SC was a Canadian soccer team, founded in 2007. The team was a member of the Pacific Coast Soccer League (PCSL), a recognized Division III league in the American Soccer Pyramid which featured teams from western Canada and the Pacific Northwest region of the United States of America.

Peace Arch played their home matches at South Surrey Athletic Park in a large multi-purpose sports complex just outside the city of White Rock, British Columbia. The team ceased to participate in the PCSL at the end of the 2009 season. The club's colors were blue and white.

== Year-by-year ==
| Year | Division | League | Reg. season | Playoffs | Open Cup |
|---|---|---|---|---|---|
| 2007 | "4" | PCSL | 5th | Did not qualify | Did not qualify |
| 2008 | "4" | PCSL | 8th | Did not qualify | Did not qualify |
