= British Columbia Men's Premier League =

Canadian provincial rugby union competition

- Sport: Rugby union
- No. of teams: 10
- Country: Canada; United States
- Most recent champion: UBC Old Boys Ravens

The British Columbia Men's Premier League is a provincial rugby union competition currently contested by twelve clubs in British Columbia, Canada and one in the U.S. state of Washington. The BC Premier League is organized by the British Columbia Rugby Union.

The league currently consists of teams from the Lower Mainland and Vancouver Island. Clubs play each other twice throughout the regular season. The top six teams are then seeded and qualify for two rounds of playoffs. The top two teams from the semi-finals then face each other at the BC Rugby Club Finals in May.

== History ==
The teams compete for the prestigious Rounsefell Cup. The trophy was donated by F.W. Rounsefell, a Vancouver insurance broker and financier and former British Columbia rugby star. The Rounsefell Cup was first awarded to the Central Athletic Club in March 1922. The cup has been competed for annually ever since.

== 2024 Premier League Teams ==
Club	Est.	City/Area
Burnaby Lake Rugby Club	1994	Burnaby
Capilano RFC	1969	West Vancouver
Castaway Wanderers RFC	1906	Oak Bay
James Bay Athletic Association	1886	Victoria
Meraloma Athletic Club	1923	Vancouver
Pacific Pride	2019	Langford
UBC Thunderbirds	1906	Vancouver
UBC Old Boys Ravens	1974	Vancouver
University of Victoria Vikes	Unknown	Victoria
Westshore RFC	1969	Colwood

=== Former Teams ===
Club	Est.	City/Area
Nanaimo Hornets RFC	1888	Nanaimo
Seattle Rugby Club	1966	Seattle
Vancouver Rowing Club	1908	Vancouver

== Past Champions ==
- 1922 - Central Athletic Club
- 1923 - Vancouver Rowing Club
- 1924 - UBC Thunderbirds
- 1925 - James Bay Athletic Association
- 1926 - Ex King George
- 1927 - Ex King George
- 1928 - Ex King George
- 1929 - Meraloma Athletic Club
- 1930 - UBC Thunderbirds
- 1931 - Ex King George & The Canadian Scottish Regiment (Princess Mary's)
- 1932 - Not contested
- 1933 - North Shore All Blacks
- 1934 - North Shore All Blacks
- 1935 - North Shore All Blacks
- 1936 - Vancouver Rowing Club & The 5th Regiment
- 1937 - North Shore All Blacks
- 1938 - James Bay Athletic Association
- 1939 - Meraloma Athletic Club & JBAA
- 1940 - James Bay Athletic Association
- 1941 - Meraloma Athletic Club
- 1942 - Ex Lord Byng
- 1943 - Royal Canadian Naval College
- 1944 - Army Victoria
- 1945 - UBC Thunderbirds
- 1946 - James Bay Athletic Association
- 1947 - UBC Thunderbirds
- 1948 - North Shore All Blacks
- 1949 - Ex South Burnaby
- 1950 - Ex Britannia (Brit Lions Rugby Club)
- 1951 - Vindex RFC
- 1952 - Vindex RFC
- 1953 - Vindex RFC
- 1954 - Meraloma Athletic Club
- 1955 - North Shore All Blacks
- 1956 - Kats Rugby Club
- 1957 - Kats Rugby Club
- 1958 - Kats Rugby Club
- 1959 - Kats Rugby Club
- 1960 - Oak Bay Wanderers
- 1961 - Kats Rugby Club
- 1962 - Kats Rugby Club & Oak Bay Wanderers
- 1963 - Kats Rugby Club & JBAA
- 1964 - Kats Rugby Club
- 1965 - Meraloma Athletic Club
- 1966 - Kats Rugby Club
- 1967 - Meraloma Athletic Club
- 1968 - Kats Rugby Club
- 1969 - Kats Rugby Club
- 1970 - Kats Rugby Club
- 1971 - University of Victoria Vikes
- 1972 - Meraloma Athletic Club
- 1973 - Meraloma Athletic Club
- 1974 - James Bay Athletic Association
- 1975 - James Bay Athletic Association
- 1976 - James Bay Athletic Association
- 1977 - James Bay Athletic Association
- 1978 - James Bay Athletic Association
- 1979 - James Bay Athletic Association
- 1980 - James Bay Athletic Association
- 1981 - UBC Old Boys Ravens
- 1982 - James Bay Athletic Association
- 1983 - Meraloma Athletic Club
- 1984 - Ex Britannia (Brit Lions Rugby Club)
- 1985 - UBC Old Boys Ravens
- 1986 - Meraloma Athletic Club
- 1987 - Meraloma Athletic Club
- 1988 - Meraloma Athletic Club
- 1989 - James Bay Athletic Association
- 1990 - UBC Old Boys Ravens
- 1991 - UBC Old Boys Ravens
- 1992 - James Bay Athletic Association
- 1993 - James Bay Athletic Association
- 1994 - UBC Old Boys Ravens
- 1995 - Vancouver Rowing Club
- 1996 - James Bay Athletic Association
- 1997 - Cowichan RFC
- 1998 - Cowichan RFC
- 1999 - James Bay Athletic Association
- 2000 - Castaway Wanderers RFC
- 2001 - Castaway Wanderers RFC
- 2002 - Castaway Wanderers RFC
- 2003 - University of Victoria Vikes
- 2004 - Capilano RFC
- 2005 - Capilano RFC
- 2006 - James Bay Athletic Association
- 2007 - James Bay Athletic Association
- 2008 - James Bay Athletic Association
- 2009 - Meraloma Athletic Club
- 2010 - University of Victoria Vikes
- 2011 - Castaway Wanderers RFC
- 2012 - Capilano RFC
- 2013 - James Bay Athletic Association
- 2014 - James Bay Athletic Association
- 2015 - UBC Thunderbirds
- 2016 - UBC Thunderbirds
- 2017 - UBC Thunderbirds
- 2018 - UBC Old Boys Ravens
- 2019 - UBC Old Boys Ravens
- 2020 - Not contested due to COVID-19
- 2021 - Not contested due to COVID-19
- 2022 - UBC Thunderbirds
- 2023 - UBC Thunderbirds
- 2024 - UBC Old Boys Ravens
- 2025 - UBC Old Boys Ravens
- 2026 - UBC Old Boys Ravens

== Awards ==
=== Player of the Year ===
- 2001-02: Mark Lawson (Velox RFC)
- 2002-03: Pat Riordan (Burnaby Lake Rugby Club)
- 2003-04: Not Awarded
- 2004-05: Mike Andrew (Capilano RFC)
- 2005-06: D. T. H. van der Merwe (James Bay AA)
- 2006-07: Adam Van Staveren (Bayside AA)
- 2007-08: Dave Biddle (Meraloma Rugby Club)
- 2008-09: Eric Wilson (Meraloma Rugby Club)
- 2009-10: Dave Spicer (UVic Vikes)
- 2010-11: Ed Fairhurst (UBCOB Ravens)
- 2011-12: Glen McKinnon (Capilano RFC)
- 2012-13: Joe Dolesau (Burnaby Lake Rugby Club)

== See also ==
- Rugby Canada
- British Columbia Rugby Union
- Coastal Cup
