= Rugby Ontario =

Canadian governing body for rugby union

- Full name: Ontario Rugby Union (ORU)
- Association: Rugby Canada
- Location: Ontario, Canada
- Colours: Blue, White
- Branches: Eastern Ontario Rugby Union, Niagara Rugby Union, Southwest Rugby Union, Toronto Rugby Union

The Ontario Rugby Union (ORU) also known as Rugby Ontario is the provincial governing body for the sport of rugby union in the Canadian province of Ontario and a Provincial Union of Rugby Canada. Rugby Ontario governs various levels of rugby (Under-6, Under-8, Under-10, Under-12, Under-14, Under-16, Under-18, Senior, Masters, Non-contact).

== High Performance Program ==
Rugby Ontario is represented on the National stage by the Ontario Blues. This program includes 15's teams at the following ages: U15, U16, U17, U18, U19, U20 and Senior; which compete at the Canadian Rugby Championship in championship and festival divisions. The Senior Men's side competes for the MacTier Cup. Also included in Rugby Ontario's provincial program are 7s teams at the U18 level, who compete for the Canadian Rugby U18 7s National Championships.

== Representation at the national level ==
The Rugby Ontario program and its clubs have produced ten High Performance players currently on the Rugby Canada National Men's Team (XVs); 12 High Performance players currently on the Rugby Canada National Women's Team (XVs); five High Performance players currently on the Rugby Canada National Men's Sevens Team; and eight High Performance players currently on the Rugby Canada National Women's Sevens Team.

== Senior Men's and Women's Competition ==
There are ten men's competitions which are sanctioned by the ORU. The Marshall Premiership and Championship are contested by the best teams from the Toronto Rugby Union and the Niagara Rugby Union, and feature promotion and relegation. The lower leagues are run by the branch unions. The winners of the TRU and NRU compete in the Intermediate Cup against the lowest placed team in the Marshall Championship to determine who will play in the Championship the following year.

Level	League(s)/Division(s)		
1	Marshall Premiership; 8 clubs		
2	Marshall Championship; 8 clubs		
3	Eastern Ontario Rugby Union; 6 clubs	Niagara Rugby Union A 6 clubs	Toronto Rugby Union Premier Division; 6 clubs
4		Niagara Rugby Union B 8 clubs	Toronto Rugby Union Premier 2nd Division; 6 clubs
5		Niagara Rugby Union C 6 clubs	Toronto Rugby Union Regional B 8 clubs
6			Toronto Rugby Union Central; 16 clubs

In addition to the men's competitions, there are 6 women's competitions.

Level	League(s)/Division(s)		
1	Ontario Women's League; 6 clubs		
2	Eastern Ontario Rugby Union; 4 clubs	Niagara Rugby Union A 6 clubs	Toronto Rugby Union Senior Premier; 6 clubs
3		Niagara Rugby Union B 6 clubs	Toronto Rugby Union B 6 clubs

== Senior Men Provincial Champions ==
Ontario Cup

- 1950 – Brantford Harlequins
- 1951 – Not Played
- 1952 – Irish Canadians RFC
- 1953 – Toronto Barbarians
- 1954 – Toronto Barbarians
- 1955 – Canceled due to weather ‘Toronto Nomads vs. Irish Canadians
- 1956 – Toronto Barbarians
- 1957 – Ajax Wanderers
- 1958 – Toronto Scottish RFC
- 1959 – Cancelled due to weather ‘Toronto Saracens vs. Irish Canadians

Carling Cup

- 1960 – Toronto Nomads
- 1961 – Toronto Nomads
- 1962 – Toronto Nomads
- 1963 – Toronto Nomads
- 1964 – Toronto Nomads
- 1965 – Irish Canadians RFC
- 1966 – Irish Canadians RFC
- 1967 – Irish Canadians RFC
- 1968 – Balmy Beach RFC
- 1969 – Irish Canadians RFC
- 1970 – Irish Canadians RFC
- 1971 – Irish Canadians RFC
- 1972 – Toronto Scottish RFC
- 1973 – Toronto Nomads
- 1974 – Brantford Harlequins
- 1975 – Balmy Beach RFC
- 1976 – Toronto Nomads
- 1977 – Toronto Saracens
- 1978 – Irish Canadians RFC
- 1979 – Irish Canadians RFC
- 1980 – Balmy Beach RFC
- 1981 – Balmy Beach RFC

McCormick Cup

- 1982 – Ottawa Irish
- 1983 – Ottawa Irish
- 1984 – Ottawa Irish
- 1985 – Balmy Beach RFC
- 1986 – Balmy Beach RFC
- 1987 – Balmy Beach RFC
- 1988 – Balmy Beach RFC
- 1989 – Balmy Beach RFC
- 1990 – Ottawa Irish
- 1991 – Ottawa Irish
- 1992 – Irish Canadians RFC
- 1993 – Vaughan Yeomen
- 1994 – Vaughan Yeomen
- 1995 – Vaughan Yeomen
- 1996 – Ottawa Irish
- 1997 – Balmy Beach RFC
- 1998 – Ajax Wanderers
- 1999 – Irish Canadians RFC
- 2000 – Oakville Crusaders
- 2001 – Vaughan Yeomen
- 2002 – Irish Canadians RFC
- 2003 – Brantford Harlequins
- 2004 – Balmy Beach RFC
- 2005 – Balmy Beach RFC
- 2006 – Irish Canadians RFC
- 2007 – Aurora Barbarians
- 2008 – Irish Canadians RFC
- 2009 – Aurora Barbarians
- 2010 – Aurora Barbarians
- 2011 – Balmy Beach RFC
- 2012 – Oakville Crusaders
- 2013 – Markham Irish Canadians RFC
- 2014 – Balmy Beach RFC
- 2015 – Balmy Beach RFC
- 2016 – Brantford Harlequins
- 2017 – Brantford Harlequins
- 2018 – Markham Irish Canadians RFC
- 2019 – Brantford Harlequins
- 2020 – None due to Covid
- 2021 – None due to Covid
- 2022 – Balmy Beach RFC
- 2023 – Brantford Harlequins
- 2024 – Balmy Beach RFC
- 2025 – Brantford Harlequins

== Senior Women Provincial Champions ==
ORU Women’s Cup

- 1995 – Ajax Wanderers
- 1996 – Ajax Wanderers
- 1997 – Ajax Wanderers
- 1998 – Toronto Scottish RFC

OWL Cup

- 1999 – Toronto Scottish RFC
- 2000 – Toronto Scottish RFC
- 2001 – Yeomen Lions RFC
- 2002 – Yeomen Lions RFC
- 2003 – Toronto Scottish RFC
- 2004 – Toronto Scottish RFC
- 2005 – Toronto Scottish RFC
- 2006 – Irish Canadians RFC
- 2007 – Ottawa Irish
- 2008 – Toronto Scottish RFC
- 2009 – Toronto Scottish RFC
- 2010 – Toronto Scottish RFC
- 2011 – Toronto Scottish RFC
- 2012 – Aurora Barbarians
- 2013 – Toronto Saracens
- 2014 – Waterloo County
- 2015 – Aurora Barbarians
- 2016 – Aurora Barbarians
- 2017 – Toronto Saracens
- 2018 – Toronto Saracens
- 2019 – Guelph RFC
- 2020 – None due to covid
- 2021 – None due to covid
- 2022 – Guelph RFC
- 2023 – Guelph RFC
- 2024 – Guelph RFC
- 2025 – Ottawa Irish RFC

== List of Clubs ==
=== Eastern Ontario Rugby Union ===
- Barrhaven Scottish Rugby Football Club
- Brockville Privateers Rugby Football Club
- Bytown Blues Rugby Football Club
- Kingston Panthers Rugby Football Club
- Lanark Highlanders Rugby Football Club
- Ottawa Beaver & Banshees Rugby Football Club
- Ottawa Irish Rugby Football Club
- Ottawa Osprey Rugby Football Club
- Ottawa Senators Rugby Football Club
- Ottawa Wolves Rugby Football Club
- Petawawa, Pembrooke & Valley Rugby Football Club

=== Toronto Rugby Union ===
- Ajax Wanders Rugby Union Football Club
- Aurora Barbarians Rugby Football Club
- Balmy Beach Rugby Football Club
- Barrie Rugby Football Club
- Bay Street Pigs Rugby Football Club
- Belleville Bulldogs Rugby Football Club
- Brampton Beavers Rugby Football Club
- Brock Rugby Football Club
- Caledon Cavaliers Rugby Football Club
- Canada Misfits Rugby
- Cobourg Saxons Rugby Football Club
- Oakville Crusaders Rugby Football Club
- Fergus Highland
- Georgian Bay Titans
- Guelph Rugby Football Club
- Iroquois Roots Rugby
- Lindsay Rugby Football Club
- Markham Irish Rugby Club
- Mississauga Blues Rugby Club
- North Halton Highlander Rugby Club
- Oshawa Vikings Rugby Football Club
- Owen Sound Rugby Club
- Peterborough Pagans Rugby Football Club
- Rainbow Griffins Rugby Football Club
- Scarborough Rugby Football Club
- The Gentlemans Inner Toronto Select
- Toronto Buccaneers
- Toronto City Youth
- Toronto Dragons
- Toronto Muddy York
- Toronto Nomads
- Toronto Saracens
- Toronto Scottish
- Vaughan Yeomen

=== Southwest Rugby Union ===
- Bruce County Rugby Football Club
- London St George Rugby Football Club
- Middlesex Huron Youth Rugby Club (Miller's Rugby)
- Sarina Saints Rugby Club

=== Niagara Rugby Union ===
- Grimsby Gentlemen Rugby Football Club
- Hamilton Hornets Rugby Club
- Kent Havoc Rugby Football Club
- Niagara Old Boys Rugby
- Niagara Wasps Rugby
- Norfolk Harvesters Rugby Football Club
- Stoney Creek Camels Rugby Football Club
- Stratford Blackswans Rugby Football Club
- Windsor Rogues

=== Non Affiliated Clubs ===
- Burlington Centaurs Rugby Football Club
- Canada Touch Rugby
- Canadian Jax Unified Rugby Club
- Cornwall Rugby Football Club
- Toronto Inner-city Rugby Foundation (TIRF)
- Upright Rugby Rogues
