= W.P. Wagner High School =

10-12 school in Edmonton, Alberta (est. 1969)

Location
- 6310 Wagner Road NW; Edmonton, Alberta, T6E 4N5; Canada; 53°29′59″N 113°27′04″W

Information
- School type: Secondary school
- Founded: 1969
- School board: Edmonton Public Schools
- Principal: Tim Boan
- Grades: 10-12
- Enrollment: 1491 (2021–22)
- Colours: Red, White, and Blue
- Mascot: The Warrior
- Team name: Warriors
- Website: wpwagner.epsb.ca

W.P. Wagner is an Edmonton Public high school located in Southeast Edmonton with a student population of about 1500. Its primary focus is science and technology. The school is named after William Phillip Wagner, a former Superintendent of Edmonton Public Schools.

== Charity ==
The Wagner Leadership Class hosts a significant charity event each year, which started in 2011. Past events include the Bike-a-Thon and the Wagathon. The Wagathon is a charity event unique to Wagner where students sign up in teams of 8-12 and compete in various activities throughout the evening. Activities in the past have included: Balloon Room, Wheel of Fate, Fingerpaint Pictionary, Peaceful Warrior, Mario Relay, and many more. Every time a team wins an event, they are awarded money toward a charity of their team's choice, which will be one of three provided by Wagner leadership.

Another annual event that is held is called the Wagner Market. The Market is a cross between a student-run farmer's market and a carnival. Students are allowed to sign up for booths to make a profit. Students' booths may include food items, selling arts or crafts, hosting a game, a car smash, obstacle courses, and lots more! The community is invited and it is a fun event for all - with 10% profit from each booth going toward a charity.

Wagner's leadership does much more charity work. Services that have been done but are not limited to include volunteer work at various locations and charities around Edmonton, Helping Hampers, Terry Fox, Edmonton Food Bank, and many more.
