= Brantford Harlequins =

The Brantford Harlequins Rugby Football Club, also known as the "Quins", is a collection of rugby union teams situated in Brantford, Ontario. The current teams include two ORU Senior Men's teams, one Niagara Rugby Union Men's team, and one Niagara Rugby Union Women's Team.

== History ==
The Harlequins were first envisioned by brothers George and Vince Jones in 1950 when the Toronto Star published a notice that British Rugby was going to become popular again. In July, 1950, a notice appeared in the Toronto Star stating that “British Rugby” was about to become active again in the Toronto area and was asking players to join. Despite being comparative newcomers to Canada and with very little influential connections, George Jones and his brother Vince pressed on and called a meeting of friends and interested local soccer players. After the first meeting, George and Vince were convinced they had enough players to form a club - The Brantford Harlequin Rugby Football Club (“Harlequins”).

On September 23, 1950, the Jones brothers were notified and the first official league game would take place in Brantford on September 30 against the newly formed Toronto Nomads. Then adversity struck. The newly recruited soccer players had an important game which could not be rescheduled and a couple of other players for unavoidable reasons could not play. The Harlequins were left with four players. A telegram was sent to the Nomads, not calling the game off, but with a message, “Don’t come to Brantford, we will come to Toronto.” So on that historic day, the 30th of September, 1950, the Brantford Harlequins showed up with four players to take on the Toronto Nomads. George and Vince figured that they could get enough players from the previous games that had been played ahead of them to field a full 15 player squad. They had figured correctly, and had enough volunteers to make nearly two teams. The Harlequins lost their first game 16-8 but this did not foreshadow the entire season. In the following weeks, the soccer players returned and new players arrived. The Harlequins were fielding 15 players for every game. By season end, the Brantford Harlequins shocked the league by capturing the O.R.U. championship title with a three point lead over the other five clubs. And so, the “Cinderella Club” that had to borrow kits, balls, players, cars and anything else they needed, were champions..

== Past Men's Champions ==
Ontario Rugby / Rugby Ontario Championships:

- 1950 - Ontario Rugger Championship
- 1974 - Carling Cup
- 2003 - McCormick Cup
- 2016 - McCormick Cup
- 2017 - McCormick Cup
- 2019 - McCormick Cup
- 2023 - McCormick Cup
- 2025 - McCormick Cup
