= MacDonald Park (British Columbia) =

Football stadium in Victoria, British Columbia

Coordinates: 48.4175°N 123.3809°W

Summer community softball at MacDonald Park in James Bay, Victoria

MacDonald Park is an athletic park in Victoria, British Columbia in Canada that includes playing fields configured for softball, soccer, and rugby. It is the home ground for the James Bay Athletic Association Rugby Union team and is the site of Victoria's annual Pride festival.
