= Nomads Rugby =

One of Canada's oldest rugby clubs

Nomads RFC
Club information
- Full name: Toronto Nomads Rugby Football Club
- Colours: Navy Blue and White
- Founded: 1950
- Website: www.torontonomads.com

Current details
- Ground: Fletcher's Fields
- Competition: Marshall Championship

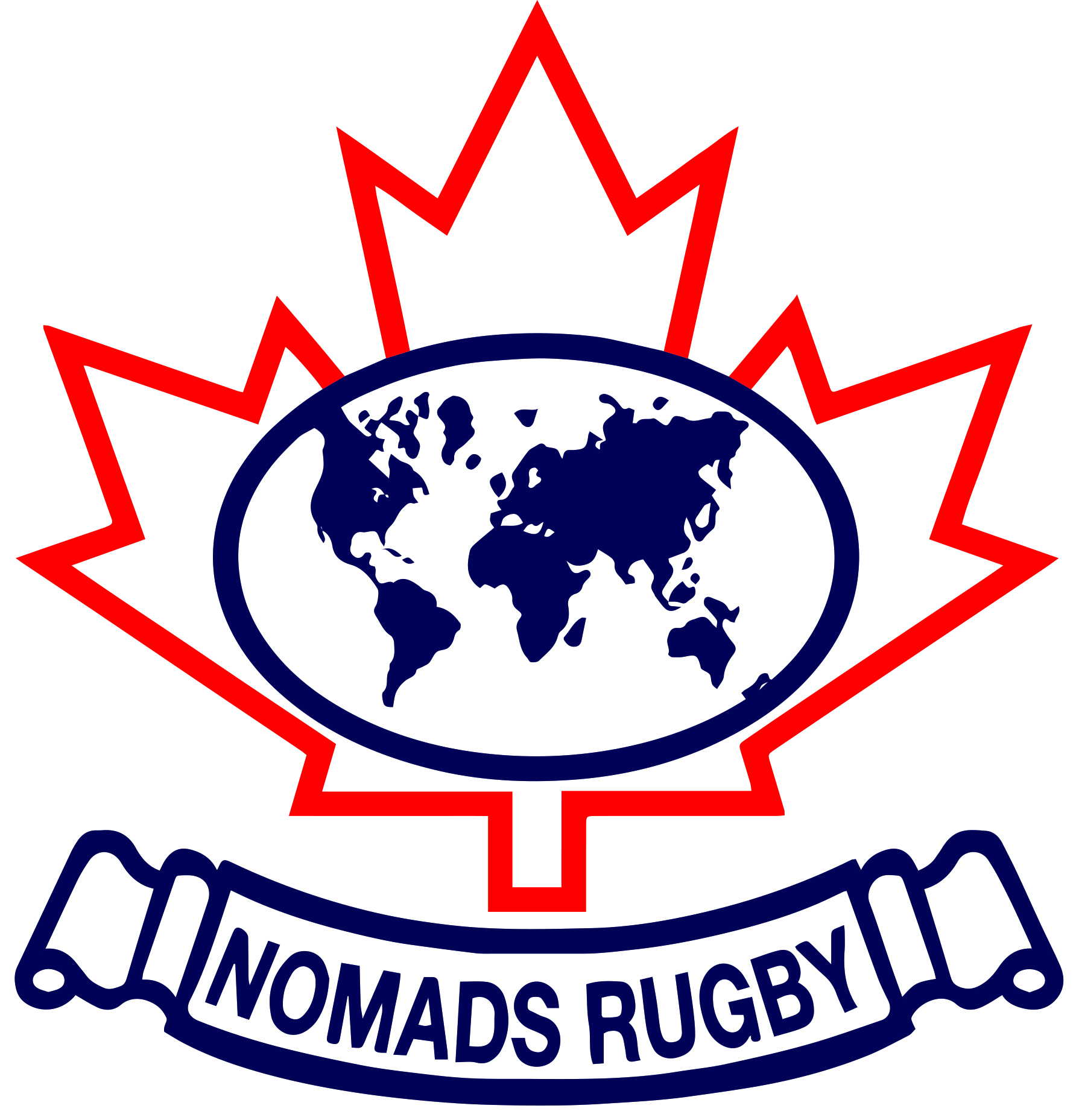
The Toronto Nomads Rugby Club's logo.

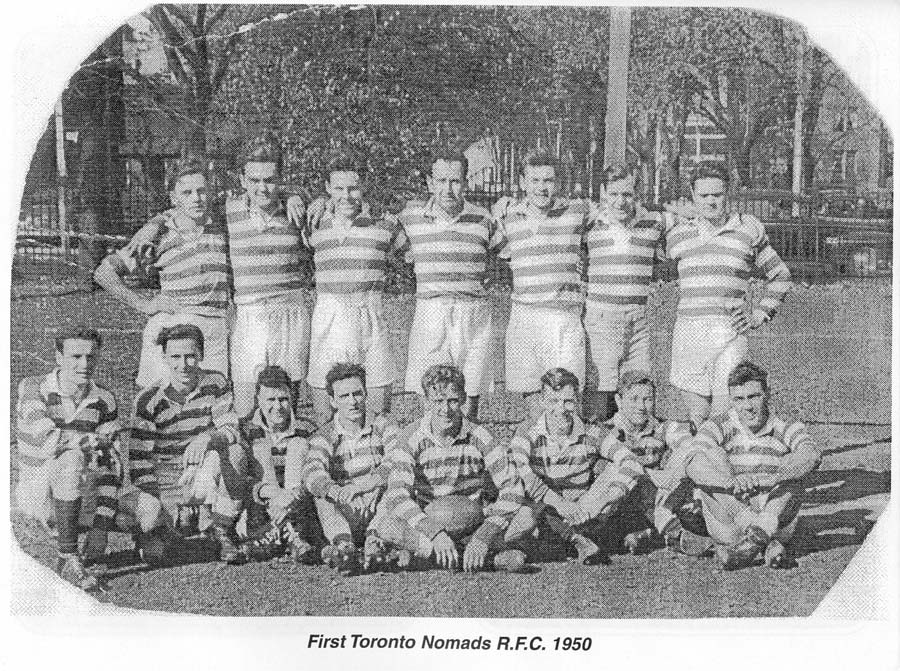
The first-ever Toronto Nomads Rugby Club team photo from 1950.

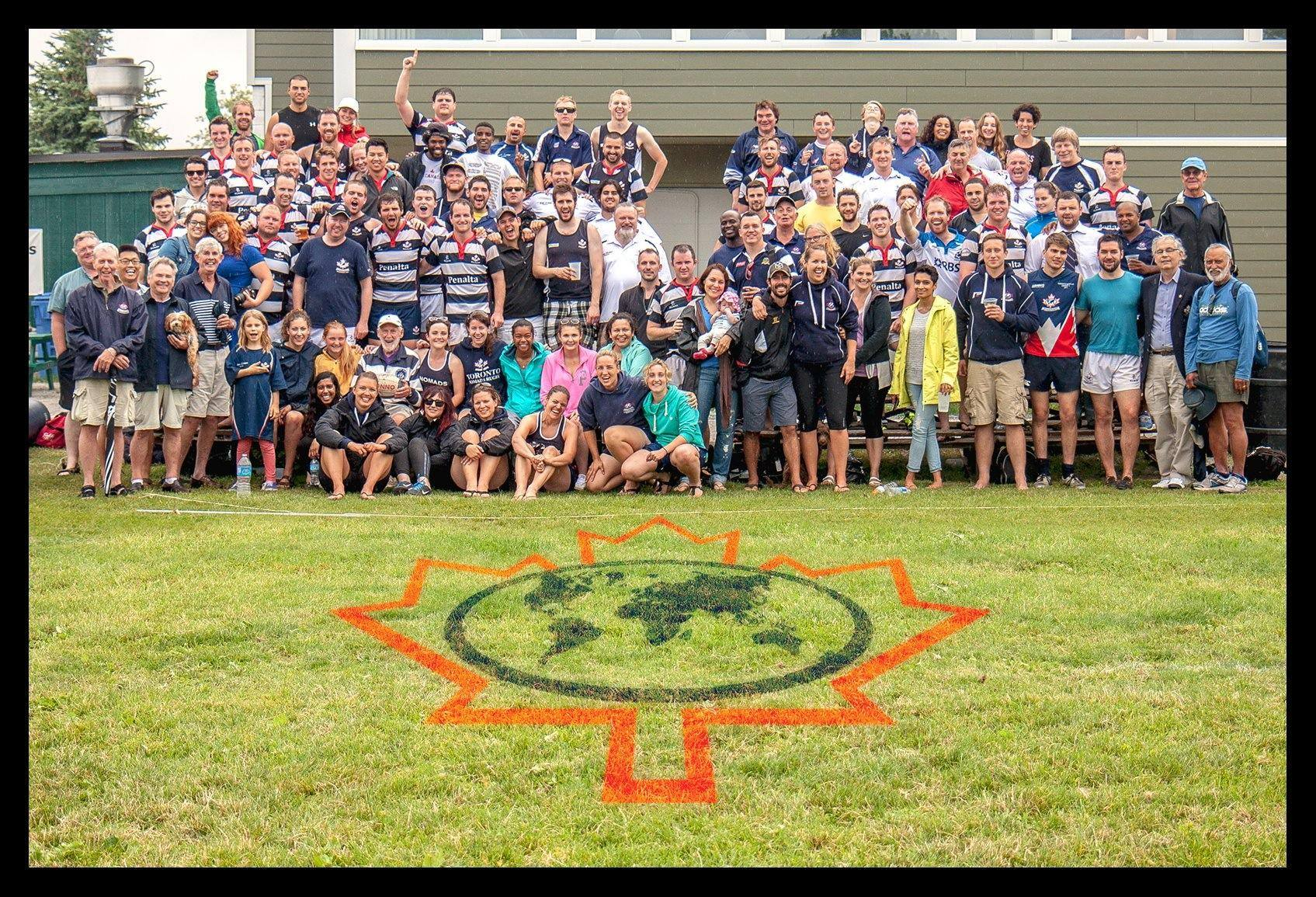
Toronto Nomads Club on Nomads Day 2014 at Fletcher's Fields.

The Toronto Nomads Rugby Club is one of Canada's oldest rugby clubs. The Toronto Nomads are one of six clubs that formed the Toronto Rugby Union and the Ontario Rugby Union in 1950. Training in downtown Toronto, the Toronto Nomads boast three senior men's teams, two senior women's and seven junior squads, running from minis to U18. The senior women's team currently plays in the Ontario Women's League, while the senior men's team currently play in the Marshall Championship, the senior division of Ontario Rugby Union.

== Nomads history ==
=== Club founding ===
In August 1950, Reverend Freddie Miller, along with an ad hoc Rugby Strategy Committee, began recruiting rugby players at the Canadian National Exhibition. Shortly after this recruitment push, 80 rugby players and rugby enthusiasts met at the Pine Room of the 48th Highlanders Memorial Hall. The group divided into three teams: The Nomads (led by Reverend Freddie Miller), the Wanderers and the Barbarians. Almost seven decades later, the three teams continue to play against each other (along with numerous other Ontario rugby clubs, which have sprung up since the 1950s).

=== Nags ===
The Nomads Acting Group (NAGs) was created by a handful of Nomads players who were homesick for the theatre they had grown up performing and enjoying before moving to Canada. The first performances put on by The Nomads were "Cupid is a Bum, Is a Bum, Is a Bum" and "Meet the Folks" on April Fools' Day, 1976 at the Tranzac Club in the Annex. The plays were such a huge success that the NAGs still put on shows today, including a winter British-style pantomime, as well as annual spring and a fall shows.

== Nomads elite players ==
=== Active players ===
The Nomads have produced a number of elite players including Kelly Russell, Laura Russell and Lucas Hammond. All three play for Canada's professional senior teams with Laura Russell captaining the Senior Women's 15s team to silver during the 2014 Women's Rugby World Cup. Her sister, Kelly Russell, plays number four for Canada's Senior Women's 7s team when they took gold at the 2015 Pan Am competition. Kelly Russell will be representing Canada at the 2016 Rio Summer Olympics where she will be playing for Canada's 7s team.

=== Retired players ===
In 1995 Ian Gough played lock for the Nomads before going on to play professionally for Wales.

== Season and training ==
The Nomads were previously one-sixth owners of Fletcher's Fields, located north of the city of Toronto, until the field was sold to the City of Markham in December 2021. Their home games are played at Fletcher's while training takes place in downtown Toronto.

Unlike almost all other (Northern Hemisphere) rugby countries, the Ontario rugby season runs from May until November. The sub-zero temperatures during the winter make playing and training outdoors impossible. The Nomads run an indoor touch session on Saturdays throughout the winter months. Their junior training programs also run throughout the winter.

== Recruitment ==
The Toronto Nomads are an all-welcoming club. All players who turn up to training and pay their annual fees get game time on Saturdays. Fees do not have to be paid until matches commence in April, however some pre-season training will carry a small weekly fee for indoor location hire. In addition to The Nomads' locally developed players, each season sees an increase in foreign-based players, predominantly from Ireland, the UK, Australia and New Zealand. Other nationalities currently represented at the club include Argentina, France, the US, and Zimbabwe. Although in more traditional rugby countries it is not uncommon for players to be paid, this is not the case in Canada.
