= Rugby Alberta =

Canadian administrative body for rugby union

- Founded: 1961
- President: Sandy Nesbitt

Rugby Alberta is the provincial administrative body for rugby union in Alberta, Canada.

== History ==
Rugby Alberta has been hosting rugby competitions in the province since the 60s:

- First known as the Carling Cup, the first division one men’s provincial club championships took place in 1962 and was later renamed the Labatt Cup after the national and provincial rugby sponsor.
- The Alberta Cup (1968), continues as the division one men’s interlock league championship sponsored by the Clansmen RFC.
- The Lor-Ann Cup (1968), the division two men’s provincial championship
- The Digby Dinnie Cup, the division three men’s provincial championship, and joined in 1997 a division four men’s provincial championship
- The Graeme Young Cup, the men’s “Old Boys” provincial championship
- The R. Angus Cup, the junior men’s provincial championship
- In 1981 women’s rugby appeared on the list with the first women’s premier league and club championship
- In 1995 this was joined by a second division women’s club championship
- In 1997 the first and only third division women’s provincial club championship took place
- Then in 2013 a new AW1 women’s division and championship were added

Since the first provincial club championships in 1962, Rugby Alberta competitions have grown in size and caliber of competition.

== Competitions ==
- Alberta Cup (Men's)
- Alberta Women's Premier

== Sub-unions ==
- Calgary Rugby Union
- Edmonton Rugby Union
