= Castaway Wanderers RFC =

Canadian rugby union club, based in Oak Bay, BC

(Canada) Castaway Wanderers
- Full name: Castaway Wanderers Rugby Football Club
- Union: Vancouver Island Rugby Union
- Founded: 1906; 120 years ago
- Location: Oak Bay, British Columbia
- Ground: Windsor Park
- League: BC Premier League
- 2018-19: Semi-finalist (3rd in regular season)

Official website
- www.cwrugby.com

The Castaway Wanderers RFC is a Canadian rugby club based in Oak Bay, British Columbia. The Oak Bay Wanderers rugby club was founded in 1906 and merged with the Castaways rugby club in the 1990s. The modern version of the club has won multiple provincial titles in the B.C. Rugby Union.

== History ==
The Castaway Wanderers Rugby Football Club is the product of the amalgamation of two rugby clubs, the Oak Bay Wanderers (founded 1912) and Castaway Rugby (founded 1965). The newly formed Castaway Wanderers RFC began play in 1990.

The Oak Bay Wanderers won their first and only championship in the 1960 season. After the amalgamation, the Castaway Wanderers captured British Columbia championships in 2000, 2001, 2002, and most recently in 2011. Many members of the club have gone on to represent Canada at the international level.

== Facilities ==
The club play their home games at Windsor Park in Oak Bay.

== Titles ==
- Rounsefell Cup: 5

1960, 2000, 2001, 2002, 2011
