= James Bay Athletic Association =

Canadian rugby union club, based in Victoria, British Columbia

(Canada) James Bay AA
- Full name: James Bay Athletic Association
- Union: Vancouver Island Rugby Union
- Founded: 1886; 140 years ago
- Location: Victoria, British Columbia
- Ground: MacDonald Park
- League: BC Premier League
- 2018-19: 8th
1st kit	2nd kit

Official website
- www.jamesbayrugby.com

The James Bay Athletic Association is a Canadian rugby club based in Victoria, British Columbia. The JBAA were formed in 1886 and are said to be the oldest sports organization west of Montreal.

James Bay play their home games at MacDonald Park in Victoria, British Columbia. JBAA play rugby from September through April, running three men's rugby teams, a women's team, and Under-19 and Under 16 youth teams.

== History ==
The association was first formed as a baseball club in the early 1880s, before adding rowing and track and field. Rugby and a number of other sports would later join the fold. Beginning in 1895, the rowing team won 6 straight North Pacific titles.

Post World War 2, the teams main focus shifted to rugby. Navy blue was adopted as the club colors to honor the Canadian fleet. The JBAA dominated Vancouver Island in the 1950s, winning 9 island titles. Their dominance wasn't limited to their island rivals, as in the 70s and 80s they would win 8 provincial championships and a national club title as well.

In the 2000s and 2010s, coach Pete Rushton would lead the Bay to two separate provincial three-peats and another national title.

JBAA has won 54 Vancouver Island Barnard Cup championships – and a record 24 British Columbia Rounsefell Cup championships. In the 2005/2006 season, JBAA won the Barnard Cup, the Rounsefell Cup, and the inaugural Canada Club Championship.

58 JBAA players have gone on to represent the Canadian 15s and 7s National teams.

== Titles ==
- Rounsefell Cup: 24

1925, 1938, 1939, 1940, 1946, 1963, 1974, 1975, 1976, 1977, 1978, 1979, 1980, 1982, 1989, 1992, 1993, 1996, 1999, 2006, 2007, 2008, 2013, 2014

== Notable players ==
The James Bay Athletic Association has produced a large number of players who have played representative rugby both in Canada and internationally.

- Connor Braid
- Hans de Goede
- Phil Mack
- John Moonlight
- Taylor Paris
- Roy Radu
- D. T. H. van der Merwe
- Sean White

== See also ==
- Rugby union in Canada
