= 2008 North America 4 =

The 2008 North America 4 is the third tournament between the North America 4 teams. Each of the four teams played each other three times in round-robin play, followed by semi-finals, a final and third-place play-off.

== Teams ==
The teams competing are Canada East and Canada West, and the USA Falcons and USA Hawks. Each team was founded in 2005 by the NA4 committee, comprising the IRB, Rugby Canada and USA Rugby.

=== Canada West ===
Coached by Tony Medina, who is assisted by Ian Hyde-Lay, Canada West won the inaugural competition. Captained by scrum-half Ed Fairhust the team won their first match 98–0, the largest win of the competition. Fairhurst has represented Canada at test level, as well, the team has a front row with test experience.

=== Canada East ===
Coached by Simon Blanks, with assistants Jeff Prince and Greg Thaggard, Canada East finished third in 2006 after winning the consolation final. The team was captained by Derek Daypuck who also finished their leading points scorer on 78.

=== USA Falcons ===
Coached by Jim Love who is assisted by Kevin Battle. Their captain was Patrick Bell. The team finished runners-up after losing the competition final.

=== USA Hawks ===
They are coached by Pete Steinberg, assisted by Bernie Hogan and Gordon Macpherson. The team finished last in the competition. They finished with one win from their seven matches.

== Round-Robin Standings ==
Team	Games played	Wins	Loss	Tie	BTS	PTS	PF	PA	PCT
Canada West	3	3	0	0	2	14	123	18	1.00
USA Falcons	3	2	1	0	1	9	68	101	0.667
USA Hawks	3	1	2	0	1	5	56	92	0.333
Canada East	3	0	3	0	2	2	42	78	0.00

== Round-Robin Play Schedule ==
Date	Away	Score	Home	Location
May 17	Canada West	20 - 15	Canada East	Fletchers Field, Markham, ON
July 10	USA Falcons	39 - 24	USA Hawks	Mt. Hood Community College, Gresham, Oregon
July 15	USA Hawks	0 - 48	Canada West	Shawnigan Lake School, Shawnigan Lake, BC
July 15	USA Falcons	26 - 22	Canada East	Shawnigan Lake School, Shawnigan Lake, BC
July 19	USA Hawks	32 - 5	Canada East	Shawnigan Lake School, Shawnigan Lake, BC
July 19	USA Falcons	3 - 55	Canada West	Shawnigan Lake School, Shawnigan Lake, BC

== Elimination Play Schedule ==
Date	Away	Score	Home	Location
July 29	Canada East	26 - 30	Canada West	Infinity Park, Denver, CO
July 29	USA Hawks	12 - 30	USA Falcons	Infinity Park, Denver, CO
August 2	Canada East	17-17	USA Hawks	Infinity Park, Denver, CO
August 2	Canada West	16–11	USA Falcons	Infinity Park, Denver, CO
