= 2007 North America 4 =

The 2007 North America 4 was the second North America 4 rugby tournament. Each of the four teams played each other five times in round-robin play.

== Round-Robin Standings ==
Team	Won	Drawn	Lost	Pts for	Pts against	Pts diff.	Bonus pts	Pts
Canada West	4	0	1	246	113	133	3	21
USA Falcons	3	0	2	165	144	21	5	17
Canada East	2	0	3	168	128	40	3	17
USA Hawks	1	0	4	86	279	-193	1	5
