= Fairfield University Men's Rugby Football Club =

US rugby union club, based in Fairfield, CT

(United States) Fairfield University RFC
- Full name: Fairfield University Men's Rugby Football Club
- Union: Liberty Rugby Conference
- Nickname: Red Ruggers
- Founded: 1963; 63 years ago
- Ground(s): Grauert Field, Fairfield, CT
- President: John Minogue
- Coach(es): Austin Ryan, Marc Downes, Steve Cappello
Team kit

Official website
- fairfieldstags.com/mens-rugby

Fairfield University Men's Rugby Football Club (or FURFC) is a men's college rugby team based at Fairfield University in Fairfield, Connecticut. The nickname for the FURFC is the Red Ruggers. The Red Ruggers compete in the Division 1-A Liberty Rugby Conference which is governed by USA Rugby.

The club's motto is Consensio, Contributum et Fidelitas which captures the club's philosophy to emphasize teamwork, contribution, and loyalty to the club and each other.

== History ==
The FURFC celebrated its 55th anniversary in 2018. The FURFC was established in 1963 and is the longest continuously running sport club at Fairfield University. The club has grown considerably over the past 10 years, and now includes over 60 students.

The Red Ruggers successfully concluded the Fall 2008 season with an 8–1 record winning the MET NY RFU Division 2 Title and advancing to the Northeast RFU Division 2 Semifinals. During the Spring 2008 season, the Red Ruggers split two matches with the Bahamian national team on the '08 spring break rugby tour in Nassau, Bahamas and participated in the Beast Of The East tournament in Providence, Rhode Island. The rugby club's longtime moderator Paul I Davis was a key figure in rugby club history (1930–2008).

After winning the Division II Tri-State Rugby Conference in 2015, the Red Ruggers moved to the Division IAA East Coast Rugby Conference in 2016. In 2017, the Red Ruggers moved to the highest level of college rugby when it joined the Division 1-A Liberty Rugby Conference. 2019 Stats are 4–2

Former Red Ruggers Paul Sheehy '81 competed for the USA Eagles at the 1991 Rugby World Cup and Will Brazier '05 competed for the United States national rugby league team at the 2004 Liberty Bell Cup.

=== Paul I. Davis oral history ===
The following conversation with longtime club supporter and moderator Paul I. Davis occurred on the eve of the 45th anniversary of the Fairfield University Rugby Club. An oral history, it captures the late Davis's historical knowledge and perspective of the rugby club. The interviewees include former players and longtime club supporters Mark Feeley, Chris Grauert, Tom Connor, and Kurt Schlicting. The interview was conducted at Alumni House on the campus of Fairfield University on October 24, 2008.

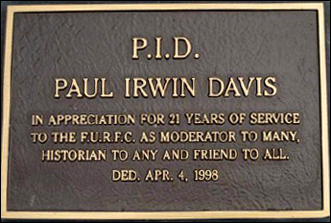
Rest in peace PID

- Paul I. Davis Interview Part 1 of 6
- Paul I. Davis Interview Part 2 of 6
- Paul I. Davis Interview Part 3 of 6
- Paul I. Davis Interview Part 4 of 6
- Paul I. Davis Interview Part 5 of 6
- Paul I. Davis Interview Part 6 of 6

== Accomplishments ==
=== Team ===
Rugby Union Titles:

- Tri-State Conference DII - 2014
- MET NY RFU DII - 2008

Rugby Union Playoffs:

- Northeast RFU DII Quarterfinals - 2007
- Northeast RFU DII Semifinals - 2008

=== Individual ===
All-American:

- Brad Troup '03 (HM, 2003)
- Will Brazier '05 (HM, 2005)

Northeast Collegiate All-Star:

- Brad Troup '03 (2002, 2003)
- Will Brazier '05 (2002, 2003, 2004, 2005)

== Rugby pitch ==
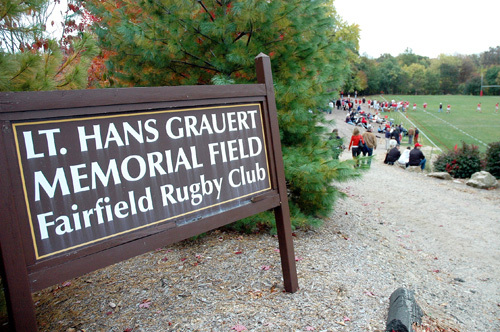
Lt. Hans Grauert Memorial Field

The home Rugby Pitch of the Red Ruggers is the Lt. Hans Grauert Memorial Field. Christopher Grauert, '68 and his mother, Leila B. Grauert, donated the rugby pitch to Fairfield in 2003 in honor of his brother Lt. Hans Grauert, who was a naval aviator lost at sea during the Vietnam War. During the dedication ceremony at the FURFC 40th Anniversary Celebration, Grauert read a letter written by his mother to honor the players and the esteemed tradition of hard efforts on and off the field of the Red Ruggers. In the letter, Grauert's mother wrote, "Like everyone else in this room, Hans possessed the traits which personify every rugger—athleticism, good sportsmanship, and a zest for life. This rugby pitch resides in the softest part of my heart and will always remain 'God's Little Acre' to me!"

== People ==
=== Hall of Fame ===
- Doug Ciacci (1965) - co-founder of the Fairfield University Rugby Football Club as an undergraduate during the Fall of 1963
- Paul Davis - longtime club supporter/moderator since 1963 and professor emeritus of History
- Christopher Galvin (1972) - two-time team MVP who served as team captain and player-coach from 1971 to 1972

=== Notable alumni ===
- Will Brazier '05 - plays for the USA Tomahawks, USA Falcons, Connecticut Wildcats and Old Blue Rugby Football Club
- Tim Kreen '67 - cofounded the Essex Rugby Club (later became the OMEX Rugby Club); cofounded the Ridgewood RAYS Rugby Association
- Paul Sheehy - played for the USA Eagles at the 1991 Rugby World Cup; member of the Washington Rugby Football Club Hall of Fame
- Brad Troup '03 - played for the Connecticut Wildcats

== Annual record ==
Year	W	L	T	Conference	Post-Season	Head Coach	President	Captains
2013	6	0	2	1st	1st Round	Rory O'Connor	Alex Cucchi	John Sullivan & Daniel McGrath
2014	8	0	0	1st	Tri-State Champions	Ben Kelly	Anif McDonald	Richard Howley & Gregory Thompson
