= Washington Irish R.F.C. =

(United States) Washington Irish RFC
- Full name: Washington Irish Rugby Football Club
- Union: USA Rugby, MAC
- Nickname(s): Washington Irish, the Irish
- Founded: 1980
- Ground(s): Hains Point, East Potomac Park
- President: Packy Griffin
- Coach: Fumie Reyes (Head Coach)
- Captain: Shawn Dawley
- League(s): USA Rugby MAC Division I USA Rugby MAC Division III
Team kit

Official website
- www.washingtonirishrfc.org

The Washington Irish Rugby Football Club is a Mid-Atlantic Conference (MAC) rugby union team based in Washington, DC. The Washington Irish currently field two competitive men's club rugby sides, one in Division I and one in Division III. The Washington Irish compete within the Capital Geographic Union of USA Rugby.

In 2017, the Washington Irish defeated Philadelphia Whitemarsh to win the MAC Division II Championship.

== History ==
=== Founding ===
In the Fall of 1979, several members of the American University Rugby Football Club realized — after a match against the Richmond Area Touring Side (the RATS) — that a new D.C. rugby club independent of the university would attract additional players and improve competitive rugby in the mid-Atlantic region.

John Adams, Jeff Shumaker, Tom Guidiotti (Dr. Doom), and Jerry Cave called friends and fellow players with the idea. In coordination with Bob Kimmitt, Jay Kimmitt, Pat Martell, Don Cotchen, Greg Merrill, Herb Berst, Mike McGowan, AB Behnia, John Braun, Jim Borrell, John Fiore, Eric Edgington, Steve Gannon, Randy Bryant, Jack McCarthy, Jim McVey, Keith Bonner and others, the new club was formed. Roger Chaufournier, Rick Devens, and Tim Harrington would be quick to follow.

The initial recruiting went beyond American University and was tremendously successful, with recruits arriving through word of mouth and advertisements in The Washington Post. The team developed an unofficial clubhouse at the Irish Times bar and benefited from the presence of many military personnel in the Washington, D.C., area.

Pat Martell missed one of the meetings and was elected as the first president. John Adams pushed through the annual promotion/relegation scheme since the team was entered into Division 3 and very much wanted to move up to the first division. Of course, the team did very well and won the challenges for two straight years and made it to Division 1 in short time. The team held its first practice in January 1980 at the Lincoln Memorial in the snow.

The first match was in March 1980 on the Washington Mall in front of the Lincoln Memorial against the team that started it all – the Richmond Area Touring Side. The Irish won that match 16-0, with Johnny Mulligan scoring three penalties and being the man-of-the-match. The club's first major rugby triumph was the Hudepohl Classic rugby tournament at the end of summer in 1980. Sixteen players completed five matches over two days, making it to the finals.

In 1982, the club started the Washington Irish St. Patrick’s Day Tournament. Eight teams played on the Washington Monument grounds and the winner of that first tournament was Richmond's James River RFC. Mike Scully actually cooked the Saturday night dinner the club served to the visiting team at the American Legion Hall on Capitol Hill, and John Mulligan did the program which included letters of welcome from President Ronald Reagan and Speaker of the House Tip O’Neill. Bill Hardy took it over several years later, followed by Ed Reesman, and turned it into what had become one of the most profitable rugby enterprises in the U.S.

The John Braun “Spirit Award” was instituted in 1983, to honor the player who consistently contributed to the organization in meaningful ways, even if they were not recognized as the "most valuable" in any single area. The award recognizes someone who is always present, always dependable, always eager to help, consistently makes things happen, and earns the respect of teammates and the entire organization. In 1988 the club won the Potomac Rugby Union Division II title by posting a 5–0 record.

=== 1990s–present ===
In 2015, the Washington Irish formed a new developmental side in Division 3 of the Mid-Atlantic Conference. The Division 3 side has a competitive schedule against teams in Washington DC, Virginia, Maryland, and Pennsylvania, and functions to introduce the game to newer players and prepare them for the next level.

In 2017, after winning the MAC championship and reaching the national USA Rugby Club D2 Round of Eight, the Washington Irish's D2 side was promoted to Division 1. Starting in the fall of 2017, the Irish compete in USA Rugby Men's Club Division 1 against the Norfolk Blues, Pittsburgh Harlequins, Potomac Athletic Club RFC, Baltimore-Chesapeake Brumbies, Rocky Gorge RFC and others.

== Crest ==
The club patch, a mixture of the DC flag and the Irish Shamrock, was developed by John Adams, who had previously worked with the fixtures secretary for the London Irish RFC at Hallam Street in London. John got a ton of pointers and all the London Irish’s “booklets” and such, on how to set up a great club. They met at The Rugby Club in Hallam Street in London. John was shown the London Irish patch — a combination of the London City flag and the Irish Shamrock. It was a no-brainer to design the WIRFC patch on the same exact idea. Area rugby supplier Matt Godek got behind the designing of the patch since the Irish were the first club in many years to design a new patch in the PRU.

== Hall of Fame ==
Since 2009, the Irish have inducted former players who exemplify what it means to be a part of the Washington Irish family into the club's Hall of Fame, called the "Irish Classics."

2009

- Jerry Cave
- Don Cotchen
- Murray “Muzz” Wilton Jones
- James “Merk” Merlinger

2010

- John “Solly” Soloman
- Pat Martell
- Greg Hair

2011

- Tom Rege
- Jack "Jick" Way
- Tom "Dr. Doom" Guidiotti

2012

- Roger Chaufournier
- Jeff McEvoy
- Chuck Goldston

2013

- John France
- Eric “Casper” O’Neill
- Damian Maguire

2014

- Ed “Cheese” Reesman
- Steve “Duma” Johnson
- Dave “Scootch” Stirk

2015

- Bob Kimmitt
- Pete McGrath
- Sean Reilly

2016

- Michael "Mac" McGowan
- "Sweet" Pete McGrath
- Tom Rege

2017

- Brian Collins
- Richard Devens
- Rich Popper
