= 2006 North America 4 =

The 2006 North America 4 was the first tournament of its kind, a rugby union competition between four new North American teams. Each of the four teams face each other twice during the tournament, taking place in British Columbia, and then, in Columbus, Ohio. The tournament was won by Canada West who defeated the USA Falcons 31 points to 20 in the championship final.

== Table ==
Team	Won	Drawn	Lost	Pts for	Pts against	Pts diff.	Bonus pts	Pts
Canada West	4	1	1	246	113	133	3	21
USA Falcons	3	0	3	165	144	21	5	17
Canada East	3	1	2	168	128	40	3	17
USA Hawks	1	0	5	86	279	-193	1	5

== Results ==
=== May ===
- May 20 Canada East 14-29 USA Falcons
- May 20 Canada West 98-0 USA Hawks
- May 24 USA Hawks 33-22 USA Falcons
- May 24 Canada West 28-28 Canada East
- May 27 Canada East 34-11 USA Hawks
- May 27 Canada West 25-24 USA Falcons

=== July ===
- July 22 USA Falcons 25-24 Canada East
- July 22 USA Hawks 7-46 Canada West
- July 26 USA Falcons 45-17 USA Hawks
- July 26 Canada East 34-18 Canada West
- July 29 Consolation final - Canada East 34-18 USA Hawks
- July 29 Championship final - Canada West 31-20 USA Falcons
