= Takudzwa Ngwenya =

American rugby union player (born 1985)

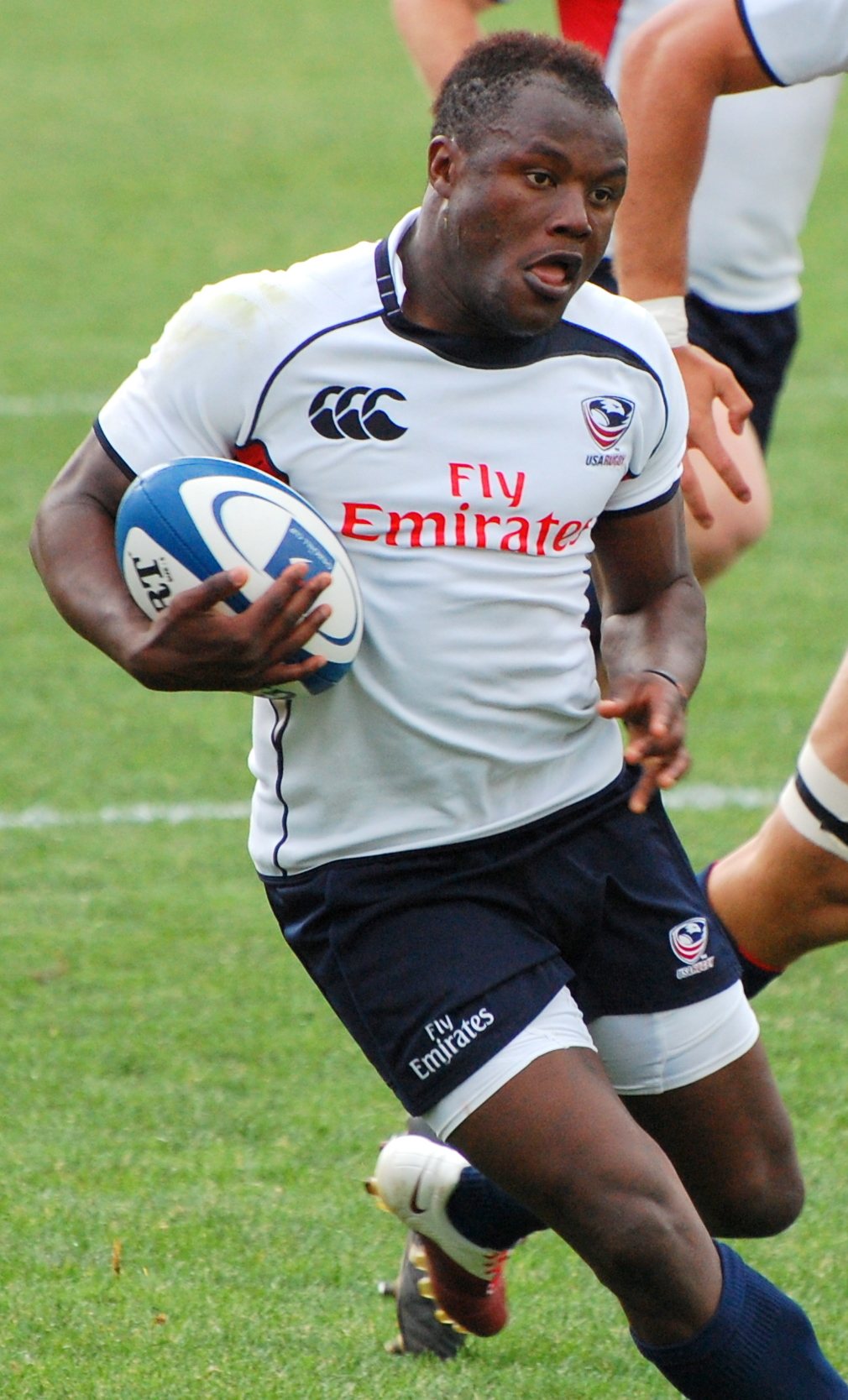
- Ngwenya at the Churchill Cup 2010 vs Russia
- Born: 22 July 1985 (age 41) Harare, Zimbabwe
- Height: 5 ft 10 in (1.78 m)
- Weight: 187 lb (13 st 5 lb; 85 kg)
- School: Vainona High School
- University: Brookhaven College

Rugby union career
- Position: Wing
Senior career
Years	Team	Apps	(Points)
2007–2016	Biarritz Olympique	239	(430)
2016	San Diego Breakers	6	(10)
2016–2018	CA Brive	26	(35)
2018	San Diego Legion	8	(5)
- Correct as of 17 February 2018
International career
Years	Team	Apps	(Points)
2007–2016	United States	36	(65)
- Correct as of 19 June 2016
National sevens team
Years	Team		Comps
2006–2009	United States		5

Takudzwa Ngwenya (born 22 July 1985) is a former rugby union player who played on the wing for the United States national rugby union team and Biarritz Olympique in the Top 14. He made his mark in the 2007 Rugby World Cup with tries against South Africa and Samoa.

== Early career ==
Ngwenya was born in Harare, Zimbabwe. The oldest of three boys, Ngwenya first played rugby in Zimbabwe for the Mashonaland Club and for Vainona High School, from which he graduated in 2003. After moving to the United States, he played for the Plano Rugby Club in Plano, Texas and went on to play for the Dallas Athletic Rugby Club for a few years. He was clocked at 10.5 hand time for the 100 m dash. DARC Rugby sent him to play for the Texas Select Side and the USA Under 19 national team, then the national Sevens team that came first in Bangkok and the 2007 North America 4.

== Professional career ==
Ngwenya was offered a one-month trial at Saracens in England's Guinness Premiership by new coach Eddie Jones. However, he got a considerably better offer from Biarritz in France's Top 14, initially signing a two-year contract with them on 6 November 2007. Between 2007 and 2016 Ngwenya played regularly for Biarritz, as a winger. Ngwenya scored 2 tries in the 2007-08 Heineken Cup. In the 2009–10 Heineken Cup he helped the club make their first final since the 2006. He scored 6 tries in the competition which placed him as joint second top try scorer. Ngwenya also had a stellar year in the 2009–10 Top 14 season, starting in 21 games and winning 7 tries. In the 2010–11 Heineken Cup Ngwenya scored 5 tries, again tying for second. During the 2011–12 Top 14 season Ngwenya collected five tries in the Top 14 and added 4 more in the Heineken Cup Ngwenya scored for Biarritz seven times in all competitions during both the 2012–13 and 2013–14 seasons.

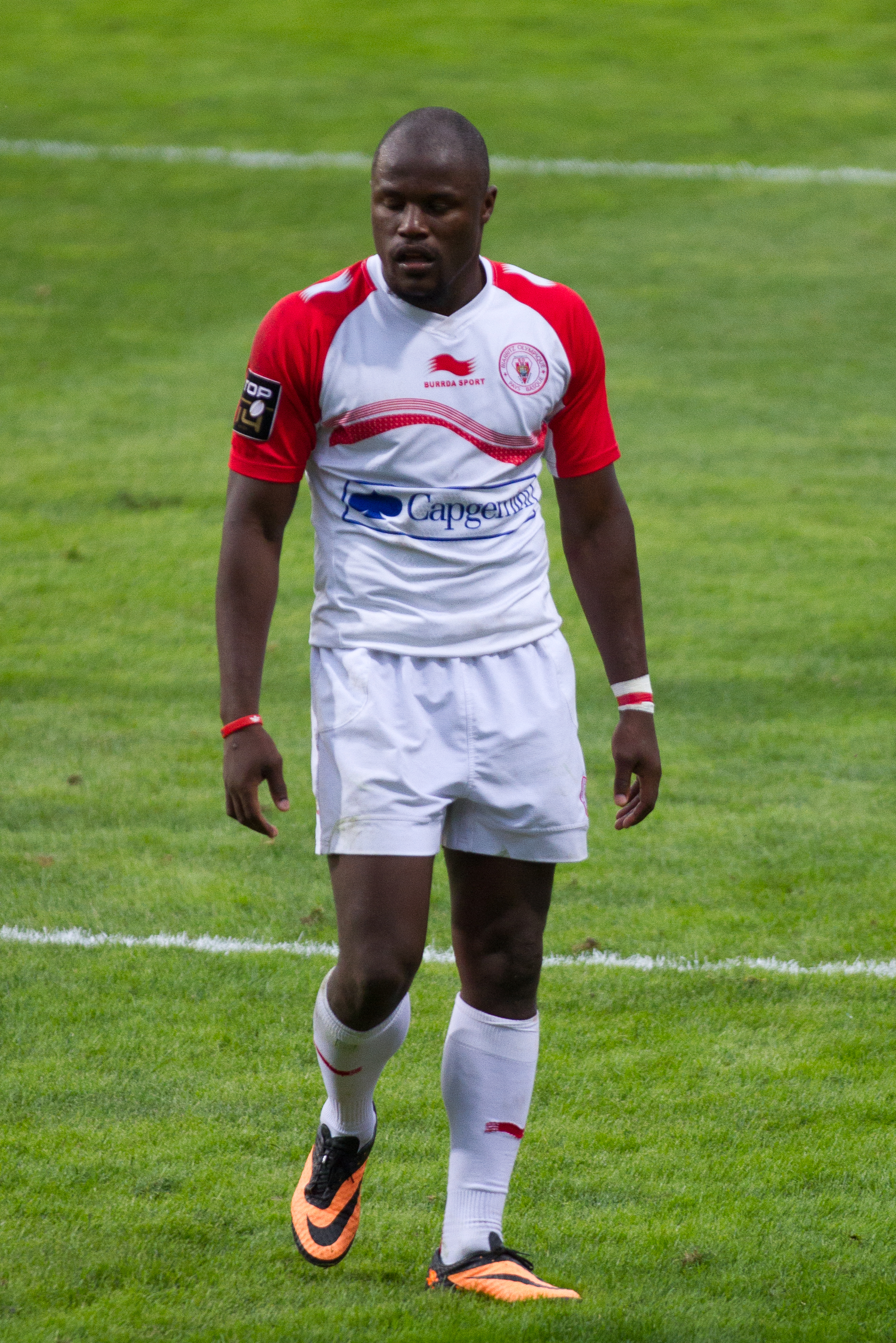
Ngwenya playing for Biarritz in 2013

After a season with the San Diego Breakers in the inaugural PRO Rugby season Ngwenya headed back to France and the Top 14 after signing with CA Brive.

=== Club statistics ===
As of matches played 4 May 2021.

Club statistics
Club	Season	League			Heineken Cup		Amlin Challenge Cup		Other		Total	
Club	Season	Division	Apps	Tries	Apps	Tries	Apps	Tries	Apps	Tries	Apps	Tries
Biarritz Olympique	2007–08	Top 14	19	8	3	2	0	0	—		22	10
Biarritz Olympique	2008–09	Top 14	21	10	6	0	0	0	—		27	10
Biarritz Olympique	2009–10	Top 14	21	7	8	6	0	0	—		29	13
Biarritz Olympique	2010–11	Top 14	25	9	7	5	0	0	—		32	14
Biarritz Olympique	2011–12	Top 14	19	5	6	4	3	0	—		28	9
Biarritz Olympique	2012–13	Top 14	26	6	5	1	2	0	—		33	7
Biarritz Olympique	2013–14	Top 14	21	5	0	0	5	2	—		26	7
Biarritz Olympique	2014–15	Pro D2	21	7	0	0	0	0	—		21	7
Biarritz Olympique	2015–16	Pro D2	21	9	0	0	0	0	—		21	9
San Diego Breakers	2016	PRO Rugby	6	2	0	0	0	0	—		6	2
CA Brive	2016–17	Top 14	13	2	0	0	7	5	—		20	7
CA Brive	2017–18	Top 14	6	0	0	0	0	0	—		6	0
San Diego Legion	2018	Major League Rugby	8	1	0	0	0	0	—		8	1
Total			215	69	35	18	10	2			279	96

== International tries ==
Try	Opposing team	Venue	Competition	Date	Result	Score	Ref.
1	Samoa	Stade Geoffroy-Guichard, Saint-Etienne	2007 Rugby World Cup	26 September 2007	Lost	21–25	
2	South Africa	Stade de la Mosson, Montpellier	2007 Rugby World Cup	30 September 2007	Lost	15–64	
3	Uruguay	Rio Tinto Stadium, Sandy	Test match	8 November 2008	Won	43–9	
4	Japan	Mizuho Rugby Stadium, Nagoya	Test match	16 November 2008	Lost	19–29	
5	Japan	Prince Chichibu Memorial Stadium, Tokyo	Test match	22 November 2008	Lost	17–32	
6	Russia	Infinity Park, Glendale	2010 Churchill Cup	5 June 2010	Won	39–22	
7	Portugal	Estádio Universitário de Lisboa, Lisbon	Test match	13 November 2010	Won	22–17	
8	Canada	BMO Field, Toronto	Test match	6 August 2011	Lost	22–28	
9	Romania	Stadionul Arcul de Triumf, Bucharest	Test match	24 November 2012	Won	34–3	
10	Canada	BMO Field, Toronto	2015 Rugby World Cup Qualifier	24 August 2013	Lost	11–13	
11	Romania	Stadionul Arcul de Triumf, Bucharest	Test match	8 November 2014	Won	27–17	
12	Fiji	Stade de la Rabine, Vannes	Test match	21 November 2014	Lost	14–20	
13	Japan	Kingsholm, Gloucester	2015 Rugby World Cup	11 October 2015	Lost	18–28	
14	Argentina XV	BBVA Compass Stadium, Houston	2016 Americas Rugby Championship	6 February 2016	Draw	35–35	
