= Infinity Park =

Rugby stadium in Glendale, Colorado

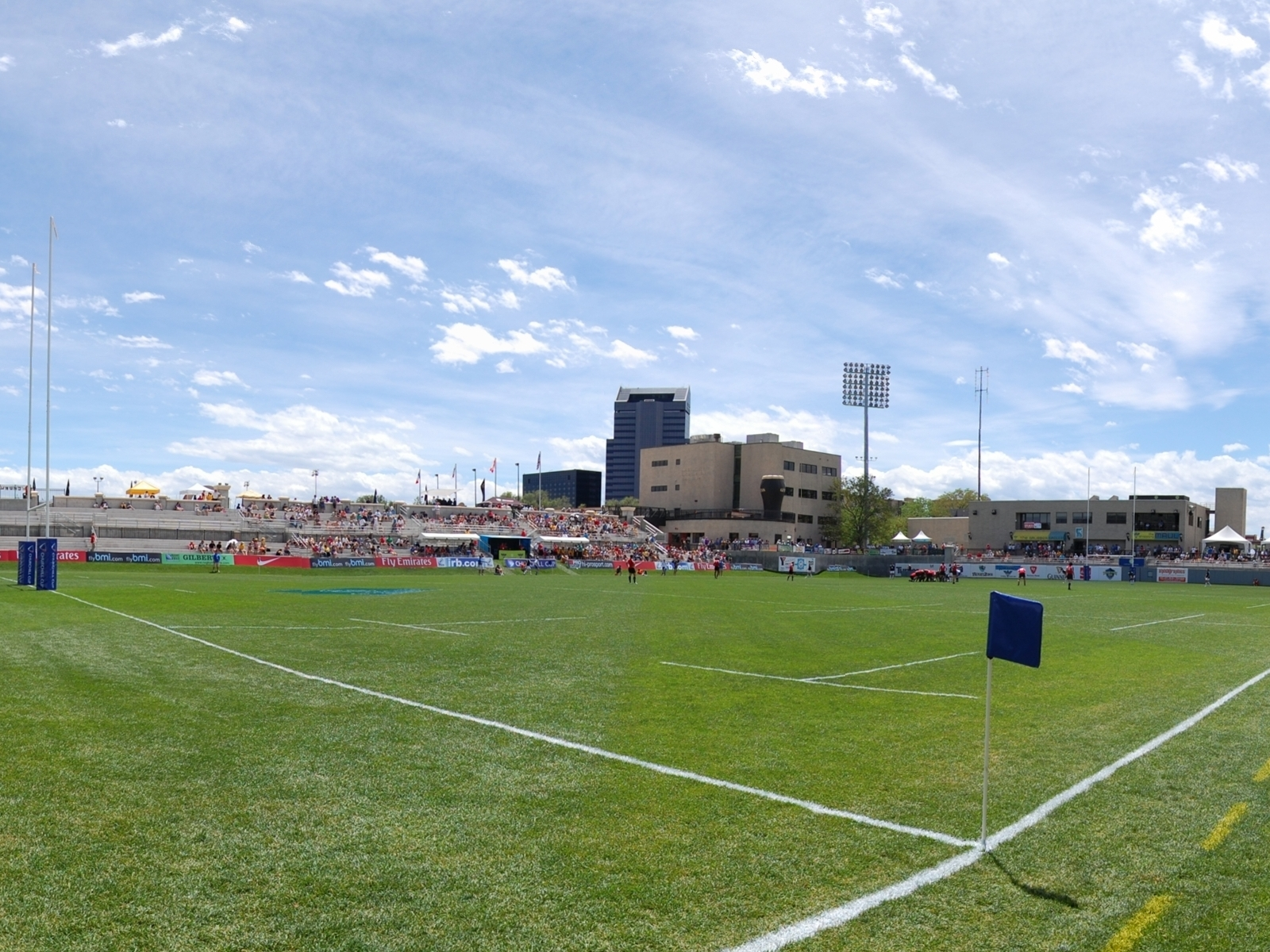
- View of the field in 2010
- Interactive map of Infinity Park
- Address: 4500 E. Kentucky Ave. Glendale, CO; United States
- Coordinates: 39.6992°N 104.9349°W
- Owner: City of Glendale
- Capacity: 5,000 (rugby)
- Surface: Grass
- Field size: 100 x 68 m

Construction
- Opened: 2007; 19 years ago

Tenants
- American Raptors (SRA) (2023–2024); Glendale Merlins (2007–present); Denver Barbarians (PRP) (2014–present); Denver Stampede (PRO) (April – May 2016)

Website
- infinityparkatglendale.com/stadium

Infinity Park is a stadium in the Denver enclave of Glendale, Colorado, and was formerly the unofficial home venue of the United States national rugby union team. The stadium has a seating capacity of 5,000 people. It opened in 2007, at a cost of $22.5 million. It is the first rugby-specific, municipally owned stadium in the United States.

Infinity Park is the venue for several domestic rugby union teams. The field is home to the Glendale Merlins, a Division I men's rugby team that have won the national championship, and of the Denver Barbarians. The stadium also hosts the Women's Premier League's Glendale Lady Merlins. The defunct Denver Stampede of the defunct PRO Rugby played at the stadium between April and May 2016 as did the Merlins' professional offshoot Colorado Raptors who played in Major League Rugby between 2018 and 2020.

Infinity Park also hosts various tournaments. The stadium regularly hosts USA Rugby national men's club semifinals and finals championships. Infinity Park is the home of the Serevi Rugbytown Sevens Tournament which takes place in August each year and attracts teams from around the world to compete for a winner-take-all $10,000 cash prize. Most notably, it became the new home of the USA Women's Sevens, the country's stop in the annual World Rugby Women's Sevens Series, starting with the 2018–19 season.

== College rugby ==
Infinity Park has also hosted various college rugby championships and other matches. Infinity Park hosted the men's collegiate all-stars (2008-2011). The stadium has also hosted Division I college rugby matches played by the University of Colorado and Colorado State University. The venue has also hosted the Champions Cup of the National Small College Rugby Organization (NSCRO).

== International rugby ==
Infinity Park has hosted international rugby test matches. It hosted the 2009 and 2010 Churchill Cup, a now-defunct international rugby tournament involving the United States, Canada, England, France, Argentina and other countries. Other international test matches staged at Infinity Park include the August 2011 sellout between the United States as Canada match and the June 2012 United States versus Georgia match.

On April 26, 2019, it hosted the USA women taking on the invitational Barbarians Women, the first-ever match against international competition for the Barbarians.

In 2021, Infinity Park hosted home matches for the United States as part of the 2023 Rugby World Cup Qualifiers.

Date	Home	Score	Away	Event	Attendance	Ref.
July 29, 2008	Canada West	30–26	Canada East	2008 North America 4		
July 29, 2008	USA Falcons (United States)	30–12	(United States) USA Hawks	2008 North America 4		
August 2, 2008	USA Hawks (United States)	17–17	Canada East	2008 North America 4		
August 2, 2008	USA Falcons (United States)	11–16	Canada West	2008 North America 4		
June 6, 2009	Argentina XV	20–28	England Saxons	2009 Churchill Cup		
June 6, 2009	Canada	42–10	Georgia	2009 Churchill Cup		
June 10, 2009	Canada	19–30	Ireland A	2009 Churchill Cup		
June 10, 2009	United States	14–35	Argentina XV	2009 Churchill Cup	1,800	
June 14, 2009	United States	17–56	England Saxons	2009 Churchill Cup		
June 14, 2009	Georgia	5–40	Ireland A	2009 Churchill Cup		
October 10, 2009	USA Select XV (United States)	10–57	Argentina XV	2009 Americas Rugby Championship		
June 5, 2010	Canada	48–6	Uruguay	2010 Churchill Cup		
June 5, 2010	United States	39–22	Russia	2010 Churchill Cup		
June 9, 2010	France A	43–10	Uruguay	2010 Churchill Cup		
June 9, 2010	England Saxons	49–17	Russia	2010 Churchill Cup		
June 13, 2010	Canada	33–27	France A	2010 Churchill Cup		
June 13, 2010	United States	9–32	England A	2010 Churchill Cup		
13 August 2011	United States	27–7	Canada	2011 Rugby World Cup warm-up matches	5,000	
16 June 2012	United States	36–20	Georgia	2012 June rugby union tests	3,800	
July 29, 2019	United States	47–19	Canada	2019 Pacific Nations Cup	5,000	
September 11, 2021	United States	38–16	Canada	2023 Rugby World Cup Qualifiers		
October 3, 2021	United States	19–16	Uruguay	2023 Rugby World Cup Qualifiers		
July 16, 2022	United States	29–31	Chile	2023 Rugby World Cup Qualifiers	5,000	

USA Record at the Infinity Park
Competition	Played	Won	Drawn	Lost	% Won
Churchill Cup	4	1	0	3	25%
Pacific Nations Cup	1	1	0	0	100%
Rugby World Cup qualification	3	2	0	1	66.67%
Test Match	2	2	0	0	100%
Total	10	6	0	4	60%

Updated 13 September 2024
