= Will Brazier =

American rugby league player

- Born: William Brazier; October 17, 1983 (age 43) Bridgeport, Connecticut, U.S.
- Height: 5 ft 10 in (1.78 m)
- Weight: 225 lb (102 kg)
- School: Fairfield Prep
- University: Fairfield University
- Occupation: Foreign Exchange Broker

Rugby union career
- Position: Hooker
Amateur team(s)
Years	Team	Apps	(Points)
- Fairfield Prep RFC
–	Fairfield University RFC		
–	Connecticut Wildcats		
–	Old Blue RFC		
International career
Years	Team	Apps	(Points)
–	USA Falcons		
- Rugby league career

Playing information
Representative
Years	Team	Pld	T	G	FG	P
	United States

William Brazier (born October 17, 1983) is an American rugby league player who plays for the United States national rugby league team, USA Falcons, Old Blue Rugby Football Club in the Rugby Super League (US) and the Connecticut Wildcats in the American National Rugby League. His position of choice is at prop or hooker.

Brazier was selected to participate in the 2008 USA Rugby National Guard Senior Men's National All-Star Championship and was selected to the initial squad slated to play for USA Rugby at the 2007 Rugby World Cup.

== Background ==
Will Brazier was born in Bridgeport, Connecticut.

== Internationals ==
Brazier played for the USA Tomahawks representing the United States against Australia in rugby league at the 2004 Liberty Bell Cup. In that game, the U.S. led 24-6 before losing 36-24 to the world’s best rugby league team.

Brazier currently plays for the USA Falcons in rugby union.

== College Rugby ==
Brazier was a four-year member of the Fairfield University Men's Rugby Football Club. He was selected a USA Rugby Collegiate All-American in 2005 and a four-time New England Collegiate All- Star in 2002, 2003, 2004 and 2005. Brazier received his bachelor's degree from Fairfield University in 2005.

== Youth Rugby ==
Brazier began playing rugby during his senior year in high school for Fairfield Prep RFC. Soon thereafter, he was selected for the U.S. U19 team, where he gained four caps.
