= Bordley (surname) =

Bordley is a surname. Notable people with the surname include:

- Bill Bordley (born 1958), American baseball player
- John Beale Bordley (1727–1804), American planter and judge
- Robbie Bordley (born c. 1947), American rugby union player
