= Capital Geographical Union =

Organization

Capital Rugby Football Union Geographical Union
- Abbreviation: Capital GU; GRU
- Formation: 2013
- Region served: Maryland; Virginia; Washington D.C., United States of America

The Capital Rugby Union is the Geographical Union (GU) for rugby union teams playing in Maryland, Virginia and Washington, D.C. It is an association of youth, high school, collegiate, and adult men's and women's rugby teams in the Mid-Atlantic United States under USA Rugby.

== History ==
The Capital Rugby Union (CRU) was formed in Fall 2013 from the consolidation of the Virginia Rugby Union and Potomac Rugby Union, both formerly part of the Mid-Atlantic Rugby Football Union. In November 2019, the CRU partnered with Old Glory DC to begin creation of a cohesive player development for the Mid-Atlantic region.

== Clubs ==
=== Men's ===
==== Division 1 ====
Baltimore-Chesapeake Brumbies

Norfolk Blues

Northern Virginia Rugby Football Club

Pittsburgh Harlequins

Potomac Exiles Rugby Club

Rocky Gorge RFC

Washington Irish RFC

==== Division 2 ====
James River

Richmond Lions Rugby Club

Washington Rugby Football Club

West Potomac Rugby Football Club

Virginia Rugby Football Club

==== Division 3 ====
Baltimore-Chesapeake Brumbies D3

Blacksburg RFC

Blackwater RFC

Frederick Rugby

Newport News Rugby Football Club

Norfolk Blues D3

North Bay

Northern Virginia Rugby Football Club D3

Rappahannock Golden Boars

Roanoke RFC

Rocktown Rugby

Rocky Gorge RFC D3

Severn River Rugby

Virginia Beach Falcons RFC

Washington Irish RFC D3

Washington Renegades D3

==== Division 4 ====
Blue Ridge Rugby Football Club

Eastern Bay Rugby Football Club

Prince William County RFC

Quantico Hooligans

Washington Renegades D4

Washington Scandals Rugby Football Club

Western Suburbs RFC

=== Women's ===
==== Division 1 ====
Northern Virginia Rugby Football Club

Raleigh Venom

Washington Women's Rugby Football Club, the DC Furies

==== Division 2 ====
James River

Norfolk Storm Women's Rugby

Pittsburgh Angels Women's Rugby Club

Severn River Women's Rugby

Chesapeake Rugby

==== Division 3 ====
DC Revolution

Frederick Rugby

Maryland Stingers

Northern Virginia Rugby Football Club D3

Rappahannock Women's Rugby Football Club

Roanoke RFC

== See also ==
- Rugby union in the United States
