= Fairfield College Preparatory School =

Jesuit prep school in Fairfield, Connecticut, USA

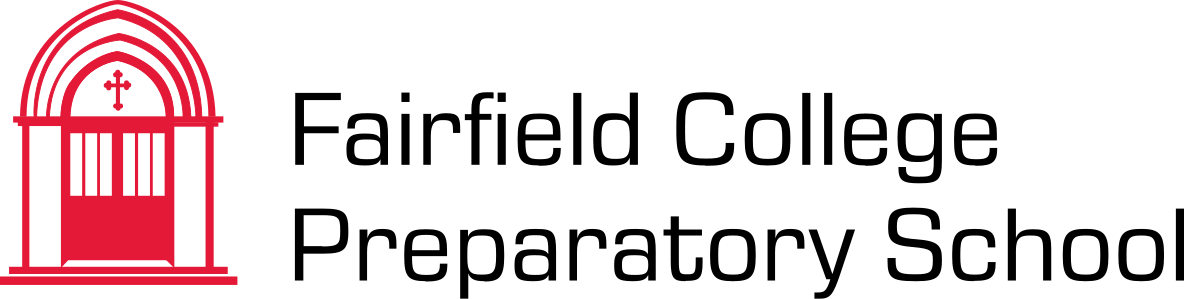

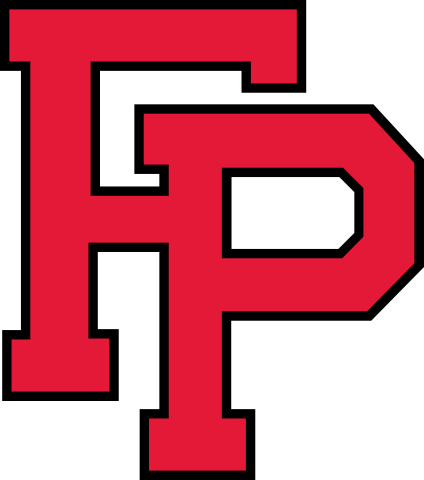

Location
- 1073 North Benson Road; Fairfield, Connecticut 06824-5157; United States; 41°9′38″N 73°15′17″W

Information
- Type: Private, preparatory
- Motto: Per Fidem Ad Plenam Veritatem (Through Faith to the Fullness of Truth)
- Religious affiliations: Roman Catholic, Jesuit
- Established: 1942 (84 years ago)
- Founder: James Fitzpatrick, S.J.
- President: Christian J. Cashman
- Chairman: Sally Bednar
- Principal: Timothy Dee
- Chaplain: Fr. Ronald Perry, S.J.
- Faculty: 90
- Grades: 9–12
- Gender: Men
- Enrollment: 830- '25 (2023-2024)
- Campus: Fairfield University
- Colors: Red and white
- Athletics conference: Southern Connecticut Conference
- Team name: Jesuits
- Accreditation: New England Association of Schools and Colleges
- Newspaper: Zeitgeist
- Yearbook: Hearthstone
- Tuition: $25,400 for the 2024-2025 school year
- Website: www.fairfieldprep.org

Fairfield College Preparatory School (Fairfield Prep) is a Jesuit preparatory school located on the campus of Fairfield University in Fairfield, Connecticut. It is an all-male school of about 800 students, founded by the Society of Jesus in 1942.

== History ==
The bishop of Archdiocese of Hartford brought the Jesuits to the diocese in 1942, prior to the establishment of the Diocese of Bridgeport in 1953, with the purchase of the adjoining estates of Jennings and Lashar off North Benson Road in Fairfield. The school began operations first; the university followed in 1947. Prep was first accredited by the New England Association of Schools and Colleges in 1945.

The prep campus is a proper boarding school campus on the east-central side of the university and has its own sports field, while having use of university facilities for many activities. The three, conjoined Prep buildings occupy a hill overlooking Long Island Sound on the 200-acre campus it shares with the university.

Students come from 51 towns across Connecticut, with the majority of the students from Bridgeport, Trumbull, Stratford, Norwalk, and Fairfield. Ten percent are students of color.

== Program ==
Qualifying students are admitted to honors courses. Seventeen Advanced Placement (AP) courses are offered at Prep. Seniors who excel in math, science, and foreign languages are permitted to take courses next door at Fairfield University, at no additional tuition. Admission to the university library is also permitted to Prep students.

== Athletics ==
Fairfield College Preparatory School is part of the Quinnipiac Division in the Southern Connecticut Conference. The school fields 15 varsity sports including football, soccer, cross country, basketball, ice hockey, swimming & diving, wrestling, skiing, baseball, lacrosse, track & field, rugby, golf, crew, and sailing. Prep's athletic teams have won 49 CIAC state championships and numerous other state titles in non-CIAC sports.

=== Hockey ===
Prep has won 19 state championships, the most recent in 2023 where Prep defeated Notre Dame West Haven 3-0 at Quinnipiac University. Prep has had four players work their way up to the National Hockey League, including Chris '94 and Ted Drury '89, Jaime Sifers '01 and Mark Arcobello '06. Matt Sather '93 has coached the hockey team since 1999, leading it to eleven state championships. Since 1991, there has not been a 4-year class at Prep that has not won a state title in hockey.

=== Swimming and diving ===
20 time SCC champions '05-'19, '22-'26 5 x CIAC State Champions 1998, 2007, 2012, 2025, 2026. Prep posted three straight undefeated regular seasons from 2007 to 2009 and won the CIAC Class L Championship in 2007. The Jesuits placed second behind rival Greenwich High School in the CIAC Class LL Championship in each season since the Class L title in 2007. In 2012, Fairfield Prep finished undefeated for the first time since 2009, and won their 8th straight SCC championship. The team won the 2012 Class LL and State Open Championships. Fairfield Subsequently lost Conference Championships in 2020 and 2021 to rival Xavier High School from Middletown. Fairfield's Rival is Greenwich High School Cardinals, annually facing them in a duel meet. Fairfield most recently won SCC and class L state championship's in 2025 and 2026. Coach's Head coach Rob Urban, Assistant's Rich Hutchinson, Brian Whyte and Vin Massey.

=== Lacrosse ===
Prep's lacrosse program has won six state titles since 2006 with three runner-up finishes during that time. The team won most recently in 2013, beating Staples High School, for the school's 5th state championship. Christopher Smalkais coached the team for 33 years from 1983 to 2016 and won six state championships. He was inducted into the Connecticut Lacrosse Hall of Fame in 2013. His introduction speech was given by 2011 Hall of Fame Inductee Howard Benedict, longtime New Canaan High School Lacrosse coach and a '63 Fairfield Prep alumnus.

=== Tennis ===
Prep's tennis team has won 10 state team championships, with the most recent in 2003. Todd Paul, Class of 2003, won the Class LL Singles Championship four years in a row.

=== Rugby ===
Prep Rugby has been perennial contenders under Coach Frank Decker, and have been runner-up in every state championship match except one. Arch rival Greenwich High School won the championship each year. Prep rugby has many notable alumni, including Kenneth Stern '06 who attended Boston University and plays for the Philippines national team, and Will Brazier '01 who attended Fairfield University and played for the USA Tomahawks and the USA Falcons. In April 2016 Prep sponsored the first annual North-East Jesuit Rugby Tournament, and prevailed over five other Jesuit schools. They have won 3 out of 4 Northeast Jesuit Tournaments. With the addition of new head coach Kevin Kery, Prep was able to overcome their rivals Greenwich to win their first ever state championship in 2023.

=== Rival ===
Prep's rival is Xavier High School.

=== List of Championship Wins ===
CIAC State Championships
Sport	Class	Year(s)
Basketball (boys)	L	1969
Basketball (boys)	LL	1997, 2015
Cross Country (boys)	LL	1997, 1998, 2011
Cross Country (boys)	Open	1997, 2011
Football	L	1977
Football	L-I	1982
Football	LL	1988
Golf (boys)	I	1983, 1985, 1990, 1993, 1995, 2021
Golf (boys)	Spring-I	2022
Golf (boys)	Fall-I	2023, 2024
Ice Hockey (boys)	II	1977
Ice Hockey (boys)	I	1979, 1980, 1981, 1991, 1995, 1996, 2000, 2001, 2004, 2005, 2007, 2008, 2011, 2013, 2014, 2018, 2019, 2023
Lacrosse (boys)	L	2006, 2007, 2008, 2009, 2012, 2013
Lacrosse (boys)	LL	2024
Swimming (boys)	L	1980, 2007, 2025
Swimming (boys)	LL	2012
Swimming (boys)	Open	1998, 2012
Swimming (boys)	SCC	2005, 2006, 2007, 2008, 2009, 2010, 2011, 2012, 2013, 2014, 2015, 2016, 2017, 2018, 2019, 2022, 2023, 2024, 2025
Tennis (boys)	LL	1986, 1989, 1990, 1991, 1992, 1994, 1995, 1996, 2002, 2003

== Notable alumni ==
- Jeff Davis (writer) '93 - creator and director of the popular shows Criminal Minds and Teen Wolf
- Peter J. Denning '60 - computer scientist
- Felly '12 - rapper
- Kevin Heffernan '86 - actor/comedian/film writer/attorney (Broken Lizard)
- Pat Jordan '59 - acclaimed author of A False Spring, ranked #37 on Sports Illustrated's Top 100 Sports Books of All Time
- Peter Jankowski ‘82 - president of Wolf Entertainment
- Kevin Kallaugher '73 - cartoonist for the Economist magazine
- George F. Keane - founder of the Common Fund
- Stephen Kellogg '94 - musician, Stephen Kellogg & the Sixers
- Robert Kowalski '58 - logician
- William J. Lavery '55 - Chief Judge, Connecticut Appellate Court
- Justin Long '96 - actor and spokesman for Geico
- Mike McGlone '91 - actor and spokesman for Geico
- Sean McManus '73 - President, CBS News and CBS Sports
- Brian Monahan '78 - Attending Physician of the United States Congress and Rear Admiral in the United States Navy
- Peter Sarsgaard '89 - actor
- Yohuru Williams - dean of Fairfield University College of Arts and Sciences
- Peter Cuong Franklin - modern Vietnamese cuisine chef
- Mark Arcobello - professional hockey player, SC Bern
- Will Brazier '01 - rugby player with USA Tomahawks and USA Falcons
- Chris Drury '94 - professional hockey player, 1998-99 NHL Rookie of the Year, Member of Team USA in Winter Olympics
- Ted Drury '89 - played 414 games for 6 different NHL teams
- Craig Kinsley '07 - 2012 London Olympic track and field athlete
- Matt Merullo '83 - major league catcher
- Mike Porzio '90 - MLB player (Colorado Rockies, Chicago White Sox)
- Bob Skoronski '52 - professional football player, Offensive Captain of Green Bay Packers Super Bowls I & II Champions
- Terry Tarpey '12 - basketball player

== Notable former faculty ==
- John McLaughlin - television talk show host and advisor to President Richard Nixon
- Francis A. Sullivan - Jesuit theologian and ecclesiologist
