= Paul Sheehy =

US international rugby union player

- Born: August 14, 1963 (age 63) Washington, D.C.

Rugby union career
- Position: Fullback
Senior career
Years	Team	Apps	(Points)
1991–93	Washington RFC		
–	Red Ruggers		
International career
Years	Team	Apps	(Points)
1991–1992	United States	4	(4)
Coaching career
- Years: Team
- Gonzaga High

Paul Sheehy (born August 14, 1963) is an American former Rugby union footballer for the United States. He started four matches for the U.S. in 1991–1992, including two starts at the 1991 Rugby World Cup. His position was fullback.

Sheehy was born in Washington D.C. He was a four-year member of the Fairfield University rugby team, and he received his bachelor's degree from Fairfield University. Sheehy also played for the Washington Rugby Football Club from 1991 to 1993, and is now a member of the club's Hall of Fame.

== Coaching and administration ==
Sheehy is an assistant backs coach at his alma mater Gonzaga College High School in Washington DC. Sheehy is one of the founders of the Old Glory DC, a professional rugby team that began playing in Major League Rugby in 2020.
