= North America 4 =

Rugby union competition

- Sport: Rugby union
- Founded: 2005
- First season: 2006
- Replaced by: Americas Rugby Championship (2009)
- No. of teams: 4
- Country: Canada, United States
- Most recent champion: Canada West (2008)
- Most titles: Canada West (3 titles)

North America 4, also known as IRB North America 4, was a North American rugby union competition launched in 2006. The competition was contested between two newly formed representative teams from each of Canada and the United States. The competition was funded by the International Rugby Board (IRB), and was part of their three-year global strategic investment programme which was designed to increase the competitiveness of international rugby union in Canada and the United States. The tournament was intended to act as a pathway to more exposure of domestic players and the national sides (Canada and United States).

The North America 4 has since been replaced by the Americas Rugby Championship as of September 7, 2009. The new tournament features six teams, including four provincial sides from Canada playing in the Canadian Rugby Championship joined by the Argentina Jaguars and USA 'A'.

== Teams ==
The teams competing are Canada East and Canada West, and the USA Falcons and USA Hawks. Each team was founded in 2005 by the NA4 committee, comprising the IRB, Rugby Canada and USA Rugby.

=== Canada West ===
Coached by Tony Medina, who is assisted by Ian Hyde-Lay, Canada West won the inaugural competition. Captained by scrum-half Ed Fairhust the team won their first match 98-0, the largest win of the competition. Fairhurst has represented Canada at test level, as well, the team has a front row with test experience.

=== Canada East ===
Coached by Simon Blanks, with assistants Jeff Prince and Greg Thaggard, Canada East finished third in 2006 after winning the consolation final. The team was captained by Derek Daypuck who also finished their leading points scorer on 78.

=== USA Falcons ===
Coached by Jim Love who is assisted by Kevin Battle. Their captain was Patrick Bell. The team finished runners-up after losing the competition final.

=== USA Hawks ===
They are coached by Pete Steinberg, assisted by Bernie Hogan and Gordon Macpherson. The team finished last in the competition. They finished with one win from their seven matches.

== Structure ==
The tournament consists of twelve games played over two legs. Each team plays the other twice, the top two teams then play in the competition final, the other two in the consolation final. Points are awarded for a win or a draw, four points for a win, two for a draw. Bonus points are also awarded, one for scoring four tries or more in a match, also one for losing by less than seven points. If two teams have the same number of points at the end of round robin play, then the team with the greatest difference in points scored over points conceded is ranked higher. The competition is run by the NA 4 committee, which is made up of the IRB, Rugby Canada and USA Rugby, who operate and finance the competition.

== History ==
The IRB planned to invest $CAN3.12 million over a three-year period to establish the competition as part of the "Tier 2 initiative", which aims to promote rugby in countries where the sport is less popular. The tournament was created to provide an elite level of rugby below the international level for both Canada and the United States. The IRB and representatives from both Rugby Canada and USA Rugby held meetings during September 2005 in Boston, Massachusetts to finalise the inaugural tournament.

The 2006 competition was held in both British Columbia and Columbus, Ohio. British Columbia hosted the first leg in May, 2006, and Ohio hosted the return leg two months later, in July.

It was hoped that the competition would introduce professional rugby to North America. It was proposed that by 2008, cities and private owners would take ownership of the franchises. It was also proposed that the competition would expand to six teams, and then eight. Two teams were expected to be added in 2008, likely one each from Canada and the USA.

== Results ==
| Year | Final Host | Final | | | Third place match | | |
| Year | Final Host | Winner | Score | Runner-up | 3rd place | Score | 4th place |
| 2006; Details | Columbus, Ohio | Canada West | 31–20 | USA Falcons | Canada East | 34–18 | USA Hawks |
| 2007; Details | Abbotsford, British Columbia | Canada West | 43–11 | USA Falcons | USA Hawks | 34–29 | Canada East |
| 2008; Details | Glendale, Colorado | Canada West | 16–11 | USA Falcons | USA Hawks, Canada East | 17–17 | Third-place draw |

== See also ==
- Churchill Cup
- 2006 North America 4
- Americas Rugby Championship
- Canadian Rugby Championship
