= Rocky Gorge Rugby =

(United States) Rocky Gorge Rugby Football Club
- Full name: Rocky Gorge Rugby Football Club
- Union: USA Rugby
- Nickname(s): Rocky Gorge, Gorge
- Founded: 1986
- Location: Columbia, Maryland
- Region: Mid-Atlantic Conference, Capital Rugby Union
- Coach: (United States) Josh Brown
- League(s): Division 1, Division III

Official website
- www.rockygorgerugby.com

The Rocky Gorge Rugby Football Club is a USA Rugby club men's Division I rugby union team based in Columbia, Maryland, United States. Gorge plays in the Mid-Atlantic Conference in the Capital Geographical Union. Rocky Gorge is the 2012 and 2014 USA Club Rugby Division II National Champions and has won four Mid-Atlantic Division I Championships.

== History ==
=== Foundation ===
The origins of Rocky Gorge began in 1986. After playing in college, Tom Owens tried to play with Baltimore but found it not worth the drive into the city. Owens discussed the idea of creating their own team with Dan Dawes and began to play with some local friends. Owens and Tom Bleichner attended the Cherry Blossom Tournament in 1986 and started to recruit for a new team. The original squad was about 18 members strong and adopted the team name of "Rocky Gorge" because they played near the Rocky Gorge Reservoir Dam in Laurel, MD.

Gorge's original jerseys were supposed to be black and silver. At the time, everyone wore long sleeve Maxmore jerseys, and the only two places to get them were Matt Godek and Leatherballs (now defunct). Leatherballs had a team set of forest green jerseys that they sold the team cheap, so Gorge started off wearing solid forest green jerseys.

Rocky Gorge officially was founded in 1986. To gain legitimacy and enter an organized union, Gorge petitioned to become an associate member of the Potomac Rugby Union (PRU). The initial attempt was denied, and the club was informed it would take two years to gain membership. Owens began scheduling matches with other clubs with the goal of improving its play. The PRU blackballed the team for not following its guidelines and waiting for membership. Owens and Bleichner cleared up the issues with the PRU and were accepted into the union in less than the two-year waiting period as a Division II club.

Gorge's first coach was Terry Kernan, a Frostburg graduate. Kernan eventually turned the reigns over to Chris Lee, another Frostburg alum. That impact turned into wins, and Gorge won the PRU in 1991. At Nationals, Gorge lost to the Fairfield Yankees. After the 1993 season, a number of players retired.

=== Merger of Rocky Gorge and Columbia RFC ===
Discussions of the merger with another club began in 1994. Columbia RFC, founded in 1986 by Rob Innella, was a DIII club in the PRU. Following a Slug 7s tournament, Gorge leadership saw that the core of players was older and recruitment was slow. Both clubs saw that they were competing over the same resources in the same area. Rocky Gorge had a good rapport with Columbia and Owens, and Columbia's Jim Hulbert talked about a merger at the Slug 7s. While talking outside the Triple 9s Bar and Billiards, the initial deal was struck between the two clubs. The merger took place to build a stronger team with a stronger foundation. The first combined Gorge-Columbia side played in Mason-Dixon's Halloween Tournament in the fall of 1994.

The points of the merger were that the new club would retain the name of "Rocky Gorge," although an alternate name of Savage Rugby was entertained. In addition, Columbia's outstanding debts to the PRU were resolved as result of the merger. Columbia's annual 7s tournament started in 1990, the Slug 7s was adopted as part of the merger to go along with the annual Gorge Cup 15s college tournament. Slug meant "Salisbury Losers, UMBC Goons".

Post-merger, the new squad played in DII and promptly won the PRU in 1995. For the next season, Gorge was placed in the DII-South Division of the Mid-Atlantic Rugby Football Union (MARFU) as part of the PRU.

=== Transition from social club to competitive club ===
Aside from two years from 2002 to 2004, where the team qualified for postseason play, Gorge suffered multiple losing seasons. For much of the 2000s, Gorge was known to be a social club with the motto "win or lose, we still booze."

Chris Lee returned to coach the team from 1996 to 1998. In 1996, Gorge also held its first Gorge Cup 15s tournament. Meant to be a college 15s event that also showcased the Gorge 15s side in a league match. Four games were played in the inaugural tournament. Frostburg played Salisbury, the Frostburg Old Boys squared off against the Salisbury Old Boys, and motley crew of Gorge players clashed with UMBC. The tournament is still played to this day.

Another tradition was adopted by the club in 1996. On the way to Savannah, Ga., for the St. Patrick's Day tournament, Vince Michalski played "Dancing Queen" by ABBA non-stop for four hours until the CD was broken. He then had another copy on a continuous loop and played it until they arrived at their destination. From that moment on, "Dancing Queen" was the team song.

Former USA Eagle Clarence Culpepper took over coaching duties in 1999. Deploying a forward-oriented, smash-mouth, always recycling style of "machine rugby", Culpepper turned a losing record club into a playoff bound squad in 2003. Players from local colleges such as Frostburg, Salisbury, St. Mary's, and UMBC joined the team during that time and in the 2002–2003 season, Gorge had a 4–4 record advancing to the MARFU Quarterfinals against Raleigh, but lost 34–8.

Building on the success from the season before, Gorge took its first international tour to England. The team played New Milton in Bournemouth resulting in a loss, Avon in Bath which was another loss, and finally beat Cheltenham in Cheltenham to close out the trip. Once back in the States, Gorge had its best season since 1995 under new coach Bo Newsome. It placed third in the regular season with a 5–2–1 record and edged the Washington Irish in the MARFU Quarterfinals, 31–22. In the semifinals, Gorge got blown out by Norfolk, 42–5.

In 2004–2005, following a mass retirement by many players, Culpepper returned as head coach, but the results didn't show on the field. Culpepper stayed on for the next season.

In June 2005, Gorge threw its first themed picnic at Justin Tagg's farm. The 2005 edition was Pirates featuring a ship ready to sail. The picnics continued for the next four years that included 2006's Post Apocalyptic Road Warrior bash with Bartertown, 2007's Wrestling Extravaganza with entry music and a fully functioning squared circle, 2008's Cowboys and Indians Pow-Wow, and 2010's Rednecks and Hillbillies Drink-Up with a pig-wrassling competition.

Year	Record	Place	Season Notes
1997–1998	1–6	7th	Didn't Qualify for Postseason, Head Coach – Chris Lee
1998–1999	2–5	7th	Didn't Qualify for Postseason
1999–2000	3–4	5th	Didn't Qualify for Postseason, Head Coach – Clarence Culpepper
2000–2001	3–2	3rd	Didn't Qualify for Postseason, Head Coach – Clarence Culpepper
2001–2002	2–1–1	3rd	Didn't Qualify for Postseason, Head Coach – Clarence Culpepper
2002–2003	4–4	5th	Lost to Raleigh (34–8) in MARFU Quarterfinals, Head Coach – Clarence Culpepper
2003–2004	5–2–1	3rd	England International Tour (New Milton in Bornmouth Loss, Avon in Bath Loss, Cheltenham in Cheltenham Win), Beat Washington Irish (31–22) in MARFU Quarterfinals, Lost Norfolk (42–5) in MARFU Semifinals, Head Coach – Bo Newsome
2004–2005	2–4–1	5th	Didn't Qualify for Postseason, Head Coach – Clarence Culpepper, Mass retirement after the season
2005–2006	1–5	6th	Didn't Qualify for Postseason, Head Coach – Clarence Culpepper, June 2005 – Pirate Rugby Picnic

=== Find a Way ===
Big changes started in 2006 when Chuck Moore became the sixth head coach of Rocky Gorge. Sensing that the team needed a new look to differentiate itself other local squads, the club colors were changed from green to royal blue, black, white. Gorge still struggled on the field in the 2006–2007 season.

Four recently graduated players from Salisbury, Matty Shover, Sean Kelley, Ashton Thomas, and Tyler Wickline, were welcomed to Gorge. After having a perceived bad reputation in the PRU from college, many Salisbury graduates were not welcomed into men's club with open arms.

The 2007–2008 season was marked by highs and lows. Gorge went on its second international tour to Ireland playing Saint Mary's in Limerick, practicing in horrible conditions in Cork, and finishing up against Malahide in Dublin. The product during the regular season wasn't much better as club leadership had serious discussions of dropping down to DIII or even dissolving. Numbers were a major problem as the club barely had enough players for a starting side and struggled for the B side game.

In response, the recruitment machine began to build. Pete "3-Pete" Ressler, who had been on Gorge since 2003, brought in Kevin Nork who played at St. Mary's. The Salisbury train kept rolling with Erik Woodworth and former Rocky Gorge U-19 player Matt Burns. Gorge also tapped the UMBC pipeline to get Kevin Grooman and Ray Ahmed.

In 2009, Gorge took its third International tour to Argentina. During the ten day, 25-man tour, the club played Central Naval in Buenos Aires and Bigua in Mar de Plata. Following tour, Gorge had a team meeting with head coach Chuck Moore and president Trace Hall to concentrate on getting better as a club. Goals and plans were set in motion with a national championship in mind. The players and coaches wanted to change culture of the club from a social side to a serious, competitive side to attract quality players.

The 2010–2011 featured a massive recruitment class, especially from the collegiate National Championship squad from Salisbury. The likes of Andrew Kendall, Derek Chell, Matt Carroll, Dustin Meehan, Rob Pashkevich, Michael Cheese, Kris Townsel, Josh Cherriman, Matt Crowder, CJ Dyson, and Jonathan Biermann came from Salisbury.

After noticing that the team didn't have warmup shirts and were getting ready for games in different colors, Justin Tagg bought blue shirts with "Find a Way" on them after a motto from Frostburg football. "Find a Way" became a mantra for the club.

With new players added to the roster, Gorge went from last to undefeated 5–0 in conference play. In the MARFU Playoffs, it beat Wilmington (29–10) in the quarterfinals, outscored Jersey Shore (54–23) in semifinals, and lost to Doylestown (31–24) in finals.

Although Gorge lost in the MARFU Championship, it still qualified for the National Quarterfinals in Manassas, Va. Matching up against the Chicago Blaze, Gorge led at halftime up 6–5 off two penalty kicks. In the second half, Chicago kicked a PK to gain the 8–6 advantage. With about 10 minutes left, the Blaze tried to clear the ball deep in its zone with a box kick, but was charged down by Josh Cherriman. Pete Ressler scooped up the ball and scored, but the try was called back after an offsides call. Chicago took advantage of its opportunity scoring off a long run by its outside center to lead 15–6. With about two minutes remaining, Gorge moved the ball wide and Jon Biermann hit Ressler back on the inside for the converted try. Time ran out on Gorge's hopes of advancing to the National Semifinals as it lost 15–13.

After the match, the club gathered again to address concerns and what needed to improve upon to win a national championship. Chuck Moore and the team president, Trace Hall, organized better funding to attract players (matching warmup shirts, team jackets). Ashton Thomas and Mark Cyphers were brought on as assistant coaches.

Year	Record	Place	Season Notes
2006–2007	2–3–1	6th	Didn't Qualify for Postseason, Ireland International Tour, Head Coach – Chuck Moore, Team Color Change from Green to Royal Blue, White, and black, June 2006 – Post Apocalyptic Road Warrior Rugby Picnic
2007–2008	3–4	5th	Didn't Qualify for Postseason, Head Coach – Chuck Moore, June 2007 – Wrestling Rugby Picnic
2008–2009	2–3	5th	Didn't Qualify for Postseason, March 2008 – Argentina International Tour, Head Coach – Chuck Moore, June 2008 – Cowboys and Indians Rugby Picnic
2009–2010	2–4	6th	Didn't Qualify for Postseason, Head Coach – Chuck Moore
2010–2011	5–0	1st	Beat Wilmington (29–10) in MARFU Quarterfinals, Beat Jersey Shore (54–23) in MARFU Semifinals, Lost to Doylestown (31–24) in MARFU Finals, Lost to Chicago Blaze (17–15) in National Quarterfinals. Head Coach – Chuck Moore, June 2010 – Redneck and Hillbillies Rugby Picnic

=== 2012 National Championship ===
With recruitment of more newly graduated collegiate players in the summer of 2011, many of the new recruits still weren't sold on Gorge as a contender. Ashton Thomas organized a Salisbury only meeting and laid down an ultimatum, "You guys are with us or against us," Ashton Thomas said. "We're not going to wait around any more. We are going to move on with or without you. You have adopt the Rocky Gorge way, this is the way we are going to do it, and we are moving forward this way. Josh Brown always looked at that as the turning point of Rocky Gorge as a whole. After that we took off, the people who bought in stayed, whoever didn't left. We took off and the rest of the season did the way it did in 2012."

The player haul of 2012 included Josh Brown, Bryan Perez, Will Miller, Josh Stallings, and Mark Cyphers, Gorge rode an undefeated 5–0 record in Division II-South of the MARFU to the conference playoffs. In the quarterfinals, Gorge beat Brandywine, 58–24, and then bested Severn River, 39–22, in the semifinals. In the conference championship, Gorge finished off Wilmington, 29–24, to move on to Nationals.

At the National Regional Playoffs at Founders Field in Pittsburgh, Pa., Gorge dispatched the Eastside Banshees (Midwest #2), 48–12, in the Round of 16 On Sunday, Gorge played a tough Montauk Sharks club in the quarterfinals. Trailing 17–5 at the half, Gorge scored 22 unanswered points in the second half to win 27–17.

After raising over $25,000 to send the team to Infinity Park in Glendale, Colorado for the championship weekend, Gorge faced Pacific Champion, Santa Rosa Rugby Club, on Saturday in the National Semifinals. In a match that lasted almost four hours because of weather delays, Gorge emerged as the 25–17 victor.

On Sunday in the stadium at Infinity Park, Gorge met the Wisconsin Rugby Club to decide the DII National Championship. After trailing for most of the first half, Rocky George fought back and closed the gap to 17–12 at halftime behind a pick and go try from Bryan Perez and an Andrew Kendall score set up by the strong running of Jon Biermann.

With the momentum coming out of the half, Dustin Meehan grabbed the lead for Gorge with a try in the 44th minute and a subsequent conversion by Kendall. Wisconsin answered with a penalty to retake the lead at 20–19, but Gorge came right back with another forwards try by Will "A Strong Specimen of a Man" Miller in the 50th minute.

Another Wisconsin penalty narrowed the score to 24–23, however, Gorge continued to pound with their forwards and backs. A Josh Brown try in the 65th minute extended the lead to 31–23. Kendall tacked on two more penalties in the final 15 minutes to close out the match and bring the trophy home to Maryland. Gorge triumphed 37–26 to win its first National title and Kendall was named MVP for his efforts.

Date	Home team	Away team	Score	Win/loss	Competition
8/27/2011	North Bay	Rocky Gorge	35–5	Win	Friendly
9/10/2011	Washington	Rocky Gorge	28–25	Loss	Friendly
9/17/2011	Rocky Gorge	Baltimore-Chesapeake Brumbies	38–15	Win	Friendly
9/24/2011	Washington Irish	Rocky Gorge	7–22	Win	League
10/1/2011	Rocky Gorge	Severn River	41–15	Win	League
10/15/2011	Richmond Lions	Rocky Gorge	20–56	Win	League
10/22/2011	Rocky Gorge	Frederick	84–0	Win	League
3/17/2012	Rocky Gorge	North Bay	46–7	Win	Friendly
3/24/2012	Media	Rocky Gorge	19–33	Win	Friendly
3/31/2012	Western Suburbs	Rocky Gorge	7–82	Win	League
4/7/2012	Rocky Gorge	Washington Renegades	43–18	Win	Friendly
4/14/2012	Rocky Gorge	Old Gaelic	38–21	Win	Friendly
4/21/2012	Brandywine	Rocky Gorge	24–58	Win	MARFU Quarterfinals
4/28/2012	Severn River	Rocky Gorge	22–39	Win	MARFU Semifinals
4/29/2012	Wilmington	Rocky Gorge	24–29	Win	MARFU Championships
5/12/2012	Rocky Gorge	Eastside Banshees	48–10	Win	National Round of 16
5/13/2012	Rocky Gorge	Montauk Sharks	27–17	Win	National Quarterfinals
6/2/2012	Santa Rosa	Rocky Gorge	17–25	Win	National Semifinals
6/3/2012	Wisconsin	Rocky Gorge	26–37	Win	national championships

=== 2014 National Championship ===
After a disappointing end to the 2012–2013 season in the National Quarterfinals, Gorge refocused its efforts for another championship run in 2014. With the core of its 2012 squad intact, key additions in place, and under the leadership of new coach and former U.S. Eagle Will Brewington, Gorge raced to an 8–0 record in Mid-Atlantic DII South piling up 413 points and only 71 points against. In addition to its DII club, 2013–2014 was the first season of its DIII side where Gorge went 6–8 in its inaugural season.

In the conference playoffs, Gorge destroyed the Lancaster Roses, 76–7, and followed it up with a 46–29 second half thrashing of Doylestown Rugby Club in the semifinals. On Sunday in the conference final, Gorge clawed back from a 14-point deficit at halftime to exact revenge on its rival Wilmington to win, 34–24. Wilmington held a 24–10 lead at the intermission after capitalizing a Gorge's mistakes. Gorge refocused at halftime paying attention to ball retention and finishing what it started. Behind tries from Nick Sylor, Nick DiMichele, Matt Carroll, and a clutch intercept by Ben Snyder, Gorge scored 24 unanswered points to achieve victory and move onto Nationals.

Advancing to Nationals for the fourth straight year, Gorge's quarterfinal matchup was a rematch of the 2012 championship against Wisconsin. In a defensive battle under horrible field and weather conditions, Gorge and Wisconsin traded blows in a closely contested affair. Nick DiMichele and Dustin Meehan scored for Gorge and Pete Ressler chipped in both conversions for a 14-point lead. Four minutes away from the shutout, Wisconsin made able to score a try off a charged down kick to cut the lead to 14–7. The Gorge defense clamped down and finished the game with a victory.

In the National Semifinal against New Haven Old Black RFC on Sunday, Gorge barely survived in an intense match full of momentum swings and tense moments. Gorge played great rugby for 60 minutes of the match building a 34–14 lead. The Old Black stormed back in the final 20 minutes as their backs burned up the defense. New Haven cut the advantage to one point at 34–33 with no time remaining and only the final conversion to be attempted. Fortunately for Gorge, the kick from the sideline sailed wide booking its ticket to the National Championship in Madison, Wisconsin.Rocky Gorge returned to the national championship for the second time in three years, facing Tempe Old Devils of the Pacific South, who entered the match undefeated. The Division II National Championship was held at Breese Stevens Field in Madison, Wisconsin. As the game progressed, Rocky Gorge's stout defense and fundamental, ball-control offense stifled its opponent's attack as Tempe struggled to deploy its offense. Gorge shut out Tempe in the first half as Pete Ressler converted on a penalty, Josh Brown scored off a designed lineout play, and Jay Benedetti took an intercept try 40 meters for the 15–0 lead at the half.

Tempe looked to have righted the ship scoring in the 45th minute to cut the advantage to ten points, but Gorge's gritty and consistent defense continued to keep the Old Devils at bay. Two tries by scrumhalf Nick Sylor extended the lead to 27–5 and the defense closed out the match. Captain and eightman Josh Brown earned the MVP for his leadership and strong running from the back of the scrum.

The members of the 2014 National Championship team are:

- Bryan Perez
- Matt Carroll
- Tony Ayigah
- Will Miller
- James Rehak
- Dustin Meehan
- Nick DiMichele
- Josh Brown (Captain)
- Nick Sylor
- Pete Ressler
- Jay Benedetti
- Josh Cherriman
- Derek Chell
- Jonathan Biermann
- Josh Stallings
- Sam Ausden
- LJ Pignenburg
- Rico Colon
- CJ Dyson
- Kevin Jackson Jr.
- Eoghan Doherty
- Ben Snyder
- Will Brewington (head coach)
- Mark Cyphers (assistant coach)
- Sid Miller (assistant coach)

Date	Home team	Away team	Score	Win/Loss	Competition
9/7/2013	Washington	Rocky Gorge	0–34	Win	League
9/14/2013	Rocky Gorge	Severn River	74–3	Win	League
9/28/2013	Rocky Gorge	Washington Irish	38–23	Win	League
10/5/2013	Rocky Gorge	Washington	30–29	Win	League
10/19/2013	North Bay	Rocky Gorge	0–62	Win	League
11/2/2013	Rocky Gorge	North Bay	61–8	Win	League
11/9/2013	Severn River	Rocky Gorge	10–24	Win	League
2/22/2014	Rocky Gorge	Baltimore-Chesapeake Brumbies	35–20	Win	Culpepper Cup
3/1/2014	Rocky Gorge	Potomac	45–5	Win	Friendly
3/15/2014	Rocky Gorge	Richmond Lions	51–14	Win	League
3/29/2014	Richmond Lions	Rocky Gorge	0–53	Win	League
4/5/2014	Washington Irish	Rocky Gorge	12–36	Win	League
4/12/2014	Rocky Gorge	Lancaster Roses	76–7	Win	MAC Quarterfinals
4/26/2014	Doylestown Dragons	Rocky Gorge	29–46	Win	MAC Semifinals
4/27/2014	Wilmington	Rocky Gorge	24–34	Win	MAC Championships
5/17/2014	Rocky Gorge	Wisconsin	14–7	Win	National Quarterfinals
5/18/2014	Rocky Gorge	New Haven Old Black	34–33	Win	National Semifinals
5/31/2014	Rocky Gorge	Tempe Old Devils	27–5	Win	National Championships

=== One Last DII season ===
After winning the DII Mid-Atlantic, Gorge was offered a promotion to Division I for the 2014–2015 season. The club leadership declined and focused on its upcoming DII schedule. Gorge once again ripped through its opponents mounting an 8–0 regular season record. In addition to its divisional adversaries, Gorge also beat DI's Raleigh and the Potomac Exiles and tied the ARP's Boston RFC. The higher quality competition prepared Gorge for the conference playoffs as it ran past Media, Philadelphia-Whitemarsh, and Wilmington on its way to its third Mid-Atlantic Championship in four years. The DIII side improved from its first year finishing the season at 4–4.

In the National Quarterfinals in Charlotte, NC, Gorge was matched up against the South Champion, the Atlanta Old White. AOW jumped out to a 14–0 lead, but Gorge answered back with two Josh Brown tries to tie it up. Unfortunately for Gorge, scrumhalf Nick Sylor was injured shortly after and Coach Brewington had to go to his bench early. The Old White surged ahead once more to lead 21–14 at the half.

Gorge tightened up its game plan and dominated the first 20 minutes of the second half. With tries from Josh Cherriman, Matt Carroll, and Will Miller, Gorge regained the lead at 29–21. Atlanta rallied in the final 15 minutes to score the final two tries of the match and Gorge lost, 35–29.

=== Promotion to DI ===
At the end of the season, Gorge was promoted to Division I. Nick DiMichele took over the head coaching duties and significant additions such as US Eagle Ben Cima, Matias Cima, Brady Smith, Trevor Tanifum, Mike Tillman, Scotty Wheeler, and John Capobianco were welcomed to the club. Before the 2015–2016 regular season began, Gorge tested its might fulfilling its home and away match against Boston. In the early season primer, Gorge beat the Massachusetts squad, 22–17, on the road. Ready for its first DI romp and sporting new black and blue jerseys, Gorge enjoyed immediate success in DI shutting out three of its first four opponents. The wins continued to rack up and completed an undefeated 14–0 record, which included a 36–33 victory over the visiting ARP side, New York Athletic Club RFC.

In the DI Mid-Atlantic Playoffs, Gorge smacked Baltimore-Chesapeake in the semifinals, 66–7, to advance to the final against the Norfolk Blues. Using its superior speed and skill of its backline, Gorge outplayed the Blues en route to a 48–22 victory in its first year in DI. Trevor Tanifum, Scotty Wheeler, Nick Sylor, Brady Smith, Nick Kuhl, and Matias Cima (2) each scored in the match. Flyhalf Ben Cima led all scorers with 13 points with five conversions and a drop goal. With the win, Gorge advanced to the National Quarterfinals against Old Blue of New York.

For the DIII side, 2015–2016 was a breakout season. RGIII finished the regular season with an 8–1–1 record. In conference playoffs, Gorge dispatched Virginia Beach and the Washington Renegades to the way to the finals. Against Reading in the DIII MAC Championship, William Lomax, Aki Raymond (2), Matthew Phillips, and Bill Bush scored tries and Chris Bleiler had two conversions and a penalty for the 32–24 win. After the match, the determination of which team advanced to Nationals was disputed due to an eligibility issue. In the end, the USA Rugby Grievance Committee ruled in favor of Rocky Gorge allowing it to represent the Mid-Atlantic at Nationals.

The DIII Mid-Atlantic Champions were:

- Jackson Drury
- Zack Herd
- Scott Hutchison
- Korey Rankin
- Wilson Campbell Jr.
- Quentin Koonce
- Philip Perrault
- William Lomax
- Neil Watson
- Chris Blieler
- Aki Raymond
- Cordell Drummond
- Nadir Mechairia
- Pat Peroutka
- Matthew Philips
- Matt Dwyer
- Tyler Savoye
- Nick Capobianco
- Bill Bush
- Zaven Mzatzakanian
- Tyler Tippett
- Michael Peuse
- Arya Koolaee
- John Long
- Jamel Murray
- Chris Blieler (head coach)
- Will Brewington (assistant coach)
- Jake Klaus (assistant coach)

At Founders Field in Pittsburgh, the DIII side played and was clearly outmatched by the eventual DIII National Champion, the Fairfield Yankees. The opposition dominated from the opening whistle and ended the DIII season by the score of 39–12.

Playing on the beaten muddy field later in the day, Gorge DI played Old Blue with a ticket to the National Semifinals at stake. In a tough, hard fought test, Gorge matched Old Blue stride for stride and only trailed by three points with seven minutes remaining. Gorge was unable to complete the comeback in the final moments of the game as Old Blue won, 27–19. In the losing effort, Will Miller scored his team's lone try and Ben Cima kicked four penalties and a conversion.

=== 2016–2017 season ===
In 2016–2017, Rocky Gorge repeated as the DI Mid-Atlantic Champions for the second year in a row towering over Norfolk, 52–31. In the National Quarterfinals in Pittsburgh, Pa., Gorge's season came to an end at the hands of the Chicago Lions, the Midwest Champion, 32–24.

After winning DIII last season, Gorge's second side was promoted to DII. In its first year of elevated competition, RGII finished fourth in the DII-South with a 4–6 record.

Date	Home team	Away team	Score	Win/Loss	Competition
9/17/2016	Potomac Exiles	Rocky Gorge	12–37	Win	League
9/24/2016	Rocky Gorge	Schuylkill River Exiles	49–12	Win	League
10/1/2016	Pittsburgh Harlequins	Rocky Gorge	7–69	Win	League
10/8/2016	Rocky Gorge	Wilmington	89–12	Win	League
10/15/2016	Baltimore-Chesapeake Brumbies	Rocky Gorge	6–106	Win	League
10/22/2016	Norfolk Blues	Rocky Gorge	23–51	Win	League
11/12/2016	Rocky Gorge	Potomac Exiles	31–29	Win	League
4/1/2017	Wilmington	Rocky Gorge	39–5	Loss	League
4/1/2017	New York Athletic Club	Rocky Gorge	65–0	Loss	Friendly
4/8/2017	Rocky Gorge	Baltimore-Chesapeake Brumbies	56–19	Win	League
4/15/2017	Schuylkill River Exiles	Rocky Gorge	7–40	Win	League
4/22/2017	Rocky Gorge	Norfolk Blues	27–18	Win	League
4/29/2017	Rocky Gorge	Norfolk Blues	52–31	Win	Mid-Atlantic Semifinals
5/6/2017	Pittsburgh Harlequins	Rocky Gorge	15–38	Win	Mid-Atlantic Championship
5/20/2017	Chicago Lions	Rocky Gorge	32–24	Loss	National Quarterfinals

=== 2017–2018 season ===
Coming off its second Mid-Atlantic Conference DI title, Gorge went into the 2017–2018 season in search of its third conference championship. Unfortunately, Gorge was stopped short by rival, the Norfolk Blues. Gorge beat Norfolk in week seven and went into the regular season finale against the Blues undefeated. On the road, Gorge led at the half but Norfolk scored four tries in the second half to win 39–35. Gorge easily beat Pittsburgh in the MAC Semifinals setting up a rematch with Norfolk in the final. In the rain, Gorge led late 21–15, but the Blues scored twice in the final ten minutes to win 29–21.

Gorge's second side played in Division I-B against other DI clubs' B-sides and other DII clubs. The team went 7–2 in the regular season, but fell to Philadelphia-Whitemarsh, 57–14, in the MAC quarterfinals.

Date	Home team	Away team	Score	Win/Loss	Competition
9/9/2017	Rocky Gorge	Pittsburgh Harlequins	49–28	Win	League
9/16/2017	Baltimore-Chesapeake Brumbies	Rocky Gorge	9–24	Win	League
9/30/2017	Rocky Gorge	Washington Irish	44–26	Win	League
10/14/2017	Pittsburgh Harlequins	Rocky Gorge	14–43	Win	League
10/21/2017	Rocky Gorge	Schuylkill River Exiles	57–12	Win	League
10/28/2017	Potomac Exiles	Rocky Gorge	19–43	Win	League
11/4/2017	Rocky Gorge	Norfolk Blues	21–17	Win	League
11/11/2017	Rocky Gorge	Baltimore-Chesapeake Brumbies	54–12	Win	League
11/24/2018	Rocky Gorge	Old Blue of New York	31–26	Loss	Friendly
3/31/2018	Schuylkill River Exiles	Rocky Gorge	22–63	Win	League
4/7/2018	Washington Irish	Rocky Gorge	21–48	Win	League
4/14/2018	Rocky Gorge	Potomac Exiles	33–17	Win	League
4/21/2018	Norfolk Blues	Rocky Gorge	39–34	Loss	League
4/28/2018	Rocky Gorge	Pittsburgh Harlequins	67–7	Win	MAC Semifinal
5/5/2018	Rocky Gorge	Norfolk Blues	21–29	Loss	MAC Championship

=== 2018–2019 season ===
Following the 2017–2018 season, Rocky Gorge made a change at the top installing Andrew "Copperpot" Chesterfield as club president and named a board to the team. Additionally, during the club banquet in November, Chuck Moore and Tom Henry donned the blue jackets as new members of the Rocky Gorge Hall of Fame.

Gorge was placed in the DI North division along with Schuylkill River, Pittsburgh, and Baltimore-Chesapeake. They will play each divisional opponent twice and play each team from the South division once.

Gorge DI swept through the Mid-Atlantic competition to an undefeated 10–0 record. In the conference playoffs, the team dispatched Potomac and NOVA to book its trip back to Nationals. Awaiting them in Raleigh were the Life Running Eagles. Life outmatched Gorge on the way to a 69–26 defeat.

Gorge's second side dropped down to DIII. During the regular season, the squad won every game they played in. RGD3 had to forfeit two of their games. Even with the forfeits, the team made it to the Central division final versus the Washington Irish. It took 100 minutes of rugby to complete but RGD3 won 38–35. Two weeks later in the Capital Championship, Gorge beat the Virginia Beach Falcons, 25–12, to earn its spot in the MAC Final. The Northeast Philadelphia Irish swarmed Gorge's back three and Gorge was unable to use its speed on the counterattack. The RGD3 2018–2019 season ended by a score of 41–7.

Date	Home team	Away team	Score	Win/Loss	Competition
9/8/2018	Rocky Gorge	Schuylkill River Exiles	55–12	Win	League
9/15/2018	Rocky Gorge	Pittsburgh Harlequins	38–14	Win	League
9/29/2018	Northern Virginia	Rocky Gorge	21–58	Win	League
10/6/2018	Rocky Gorge	Washington Irish	63–10	Win	League
10/20/2018	Potomac Exiles	Rocky Gorge	12–17	Win	League
11/10/2018	Rocky Gorge	Baltimore-Chesapeake Brumbies	54–19	Win	League
3/16/2019	Schuylkill River Exiles	Rocky Gorge	19–54	Win	League
3/23/2019	Baltimore-Chesapeake Brumbies	Rocky Gorge	17–38	Win	League
3/30/2019	Rocky Gorge	Norfolk Blues	48–28	Win	League
4/6/2019	Pittsburgh Harlequins	Rocky Gorge	22–76	Win	League
4/13/2019	Rocky Gorge	Potomac Exiles	48–28	Win	MAC Semifinal
4/27/2019	Rocky Gorge	Northern Virginia	56–24	Win	MAC Championship
5/4/2019	Rocky Gorge	Life Running Eagles	26–69	Loss	National Quarterfinal

=== 2019–2020 season ===
After dropping its first game on the road against Schuylkill River, DI finished the fall with six straight victories to lead the north division. D3 followed up its Capital Championship with four consecutive wins to open the fall. RGD3 fell against division leaders, the Washington Irish and Severn River, to complete 2019 in third place at 5–2.

As the year flipped to 2020, the spring and entire season ended abruptly. USA Rugby shut down club rugby due to the COVID-19 virus and all games and team activities were cancelled.

Date	Home team	Away team	Score	Win/Loss	Competition
9/14/2019	Schuylkill River Exiles	Rocky Gorge	27–25	Loss	League
9/21/2019	Rocky Gorge	Baltimore-Chesapeake Brumbies	42–28	Win	League
9/28/2019	Pittsburgh Harlequins	Rocky Gorge	13–38	Win	League
10/5/2019	Rocky Gorge	Northern Virginia	38–21	Win	League
10/19/2019	Rocky Gorge	Potomac Exiles	31–22	Win	League
11/2/2019	Rocky Gorge	Schuylkill River Exiles	34–28	Win	League
11/9/2019	Washington Irish	Rocky Gorge	40–30	Win	League

=== 2021–2022 season ===
Following the sudden end of the 2019–2020 season, rugby began in the spring of 2021. Spring held only friendly matches between clubs in order to rebuild and return to play. Gorge began to rally in the fall of 2021, bringing both new and old faces to hopefully reach the playoffs once more.

Date	Home team	Away team	Score	Win/Loss	Competition
9/18/21	Schuylkill River Exiles	Rocky Gorge	24–38	Win	League
10/2/21	Baltimore Chesapeake	Rocky Gorge	29–44	Win	League
10/9/21	Rocky Gorge	Potomac Exiles	19–29	Loss	League
10/16/21	Rocky Gorge	Northern Virginia	24–28	Loss	League
10/30/21	Pittsburgh Harlequins	Rocky Gorge	26–66	Win	League
11/6/21	Rocky Gorge	Washington Irish	50–5	Win	League
3/5/22	Rocky Gorge	Washington Irish	61–0	Win	Friendly
3/19/22	Rocky Gorge	Old Blue	30–24	Win	Friendly
3/26/22	Rocky Gorge	Norfolk Blues	43–42	Win	League
4/9/22	Rocky Gorge	Baltimore Chesapeake	18–13	Win	MAC Semi-Final
4/23/22	Schuylkill River Exiles	Rocky Gorge	48–45	Loss	MAC Final

=== 2022–2023 season ===
Rocky Gorge finished in first place in DI with a 7–0–1 record and D3 came in second at 6–4. In the DI MAC Semifinals, Gorge defeated the Potomac Exiles 17–15 and advanced to the finals against NOVA. Gorge captured its fourth MAC championship with a 31–26 victory over NOVA.

At the National Atlantic Super Regional in Glen Allen, Virginia, Gorge faced off against Old Blue. The match was a thriller which needed extra time to determine the victor. Ultimately, Old Blue prevailed 25–22 in overtime.

Date	Home team	Away team	Score	Win/Loss	Competition
9/10/22	Rocky Gorge	Pittsburgh	61-0	Win	League
9/17/22	Potomac Exiles	Rocky Gorge	38-38	Draw	League
9/24/22	Rocky Gorge	Washington	67-14	Win	League
10/1/22	Washington Irish	Rocky Gorge	0-95	Win	League
10/15/22	Rocky Gorge	NOVA	34-21	Win	League
10/29/22	Rocky Gorge	Schuylkill River	41-0	Win	League
3/4/23	Old Blue	Rocky Gorge	35-25	Win	Friendly
3/18/23	Norfolk Blues	Rocky Gorge	70-31	Win	League
3/25/23	Rocky Gorge	Baltimore Chesapeake	40-21	Win	Friendly
4/15/23	Rocky Gorge	Potomac Exiles	17-15	Win	MAC Semifinal
4/22/23	Rocky Gorge	NOVA	31-26	Win	MAC Final
4/29/23	Rocky Gorge	Old Blue	22-25	Loss	Atlantic Super Regional

=== 2023-2024 season ===
Date	Home team	Away team	Score	Win/Loss	Competition
9/16/23	Baltimore Chesapeake	Rocky Gorge	0-56	Win	League
9/30/23	Schuylkill River Exiles	Rocky Gorge	17-26	Win	League
10/7/23	Rocky Gorge	Washington Irish	64-5	Win	League
10/21/23	Rocky Gorge	Northern Virginia	53-17	Win	League
11/4/23	Pittsburgh Harlequins	Rocky Gorge	0-125	Win	League
3/9/24	Rocky Gorge	Norfolk Blues	42-0	Win	League
3/16/24	Washington	Rocky Gorge	17-33	Win	League
3/23/24	Rocky Gorge	Potomac Exiles	7-20	Loss	League
4/13/24	Rocky Gorge	NOVA			MAC Semifinal
