= Vainona High School =

High school in Zimbabwe

Information
- School type: High school
- Established: 1974; 52 years ago

Vainona High School is a high school in a suburb called Vainona, near Borrowdale, in the City of Harare, in the Southern African country of Zimbabwe.

== History ==
Vainona High School accepted its first 150 pupils in January 1974. The founder-head-master was Mr. William (Bill) A. Staude. The school was officially opened by the Secretary of Education, Mr. J.A.C. Houlton in 1976.

The school is located on what was originally a farm, and the original buildings, comprising double-storey blocks, were called the Old Concourse. Over the years, the grounds were developed into terraces, and facilities were gradually added.

== Leadership ==
In 1978, Mr. P. J. Snyder became headmaster. Mr. Synder was the head until 1984, when Mr. Musa took over the position. The current Headmaster is Dr. Hapias Dhakwa. He took over in 2018, from Mr. A. Mhene who was the headmaster when there was a fees fraud scandal at the school in the same year. who took over from the Headmistress Mrs. N. Chinamasawho had taken over from Mrs B Sibanda who had retired aged 65. Mrs. B. Sibanda replaced the Mr. D P Makanza who died in June 2013. Previous headmaster Nhembe died in April 2022. Mr Mugumwa is now the senior master alongside the senior woman Mrs Chinamasa.

== Notable alumni ==
Many famous Zimbabwe sports personalities attended Vainona High School.

- Andy Flower, Zimbabwean cricket player, before he moved to St Georges
- Allan Mwayenga, Zimbabwean cricket player
- Takudzwa Ngwenya, rugby union player for the USA (Eagles) and Biarritz in France
