= Craig Kinsley =

American javelin thrower (born 1989)

Personal information
- Nationality: United States
- Born: January 19, 1989 (age 37)
- Height: 6 ft 1.5 in (1.867 m)
- Weight: 208 lb (94 kg)
- Website: CraigKinsleyJavelin.com

Sport
- Sport: Track and field
- Event: Javelin throw
- College team: Brown Bears
- Coached by: Michelle Eisenreich

Achievements and titles
- Personal best: Javelin: 82.31m

Craig Kinsley (born January 19, 1989) is a retired American track and field athlete and 2012 Olympian who competed in the javelin throw, and is now an assistant coach of Brown University track and field. In 2010, he won the javelin at the NCAA Outdoor Championships and was named as an Academic All-American by the USATFCCCA. He also placed third at the US National Championships that year. In 2012, he placed third at the Olympic Trials and qualified to represent the United States at the 2012 Summer Olympics.

== Early life ==
Craig Kinsley was born January 19, 1989, to parents Tom and Andrea. He began competing in track and field after a broken hand prevented him from playing baseball his junior year of high school. At first, he ran the hurdles and did the high jump. After his hand had healed sufficiently, he added the javelin, throwing with a cast on his hand.

During high school, Kinsley was named all-state in the decathlon, high jump, and javelin throw. He graduated from Fairfield College Preparatory School in 2007 and was accepted into Brown University where he studied geology and economics.

== Athletic career ==
At Brown, Kinsley competed in both the high jump and javelin throw. He was a four-time Ivy League Champion and three-time All-American. He finished third in the javelin at the 2009 NCAA Outdoor Championships. In 2010, Kinsley won the NCAA title in javelin. His mark of 76.29 metres (250.3 ft) was more than eight feet better than the second-place finisher. In so doing, Kinsley became just the third individual track and field champion in the school's history. That same year, he finished third at the National Championships with a distance of 78.10 metres (256.2 ft). Additionally, he was named an Academic All-American and Northeast Region Field Athlete of the Year by the USATFCCCA.

Kinsley was injured in 2011 and unable to defend his title as a result. After graduating that spring with degrees in geology and economics, he decided to commit himself solely to the javelin and put everything else on hold. He found the cheapest apartment he could and focused his economic resources on training needs. He continued to train at the Brown facilities in Providence, Rhode Island, where he was a volunteer assistant coach.

At the June 2012 Olympic Trials, Kinsley finished third with a distance of 79.92 metres (262.2 ft). Earlier that month, he achieved the Olympic "A" Standard with a new personal best of 82.31 metres (270.0 ft). The distance made him eligible for the 2012 Summer Olympics and ranked him in the top 20 worldwide for the first time in his career. "For about 90 percent of the victory lap, I was bawling in front of 30,000 people," Kinsley said of making the Olympic team. "I don't know if I can think of a person who'd be more proud to wear red, white and blue."

The 2012 Olympics was Kinsley's first international competition. "I'm a total nobody on the international scene, which is awesome because I go in with very little pressure," he remarked. "I go in healthy and throwing the best I've ever thrown. I feel I have some big throws, so I'm ready to surprise people." On August 8, 2012, Kinsley made his Olympic debut in the Qualification round of the Men's Javelin Throw. On his third and final throw of the day he was marked at 78.18 meters, placing him 10th in Group B and 23rd overall. Although the throw was the longest of any American, Kinsley did not advance to the next round of the competition. He was joined in London by his parents, girlfriend, coach, and two old friends.

Kinsley was coached by Michelle Eisenreich and sponsored by US Athletic Trust. He describes throwing the javelin as "an incredibly lonely pursuit ... You're training for hours, by yourself. You're putting your body through a lot of stress ... It takes a lot to dedication to do something nobody thinks is cool unless you make the Olympic team."

== Coaching career ==
Kinsley returned to his alma mater Brown University to coach the throwing events in 2016. Since then, his athletes have accumulated many notable accolades: three conference champions, nine top-six finishers in the conference championships, a new school record holder in the hammer throw and the weight throw, and seven additions/improvements in the top 10 all time school records. He is currently working to build an elite javelin squad and aspires to produce an NCAA champion and an Olympic qualifying athlete in the near future.

== Personal life ==
Kinsley currently resides in Cranston, Rhode Island. He is happily married to photographer Kat Carney.

== Seasonal bests by year ==
- 2009 – 73.62
- 2010 – 78.10
- 2011 – 76.33
- 2012 – 82.31
- 2013 – 74.75
- 2014 – 81.35
- 2015 – 77.85

== Competition record ==
Year	Competition	Venue	Position	Event	Notes
Representing the United States
2014	Pan American Sports Festival	Mexico City, Mexico	2nd	Javelin	78.76m A
