= Nick Kuhl =

American rugby union player

- Born: Pasadena, Maryland
- Height: 5’11”
- Weight: 185 lb (84 kg)
- School: Archbishop Spalding High School
- University: Salisbury University

Rugby union career
- Position: Full Back
Youth career
- 2010-14: Salisbury Sharks
Amateur team(s)
Years	Team	Apps	(Points)
- Rocky Gorge
Senior career
Years	Team	Apps	(Points)
2019-present	Old Glory DC	4	(23)

Nick Kuhl born in Pasadena, Maryland is an American professional rugby union player. He plays as a full back for the Old Glory DC in Major League Rugby.

Kuhl is originally from Pasadena, Maryland and grew up playing rugby and football at Archbishop Spalding High School in Severn, Maryland, earning All-MIAA honors for each. He went on to play for Salisbury University between 2010 and 2014 where he earned a bachelor's degree in Exercise Science, Allied Health Track, and was a three-time Collegiate All-American. During his time as an amateur rugby player, he represented Rocky Gorge RFC and captained the Washington, D.C. Capital Selects.

On 16 May 2019, Kuhl was signed by Washington, D.C.–based Old Glory DC. Intending to join Major League Rugby in 2020, Old Glory staged an exhibition campaign for May and June 2019. Kuhl started at full-back in DC's inaugural game against Ireland's Shannon RFC on Sunday 19 May, playing as Old Glory's designated kicker and slotting two of three conversions and his one penalty opportunity. On May 27, Kuhl again started at full-back for Old Glory in a heavy 70-7 defeat at home to the Scotland U20s. Kuhl played as Old Glory recorded their first victory in franchise history, running out 28-7 victors over the USA Rugby South Panthers, with Kuhl again providing points from the boot. On 9 June 2018, Kuhl was named as vice-captain as Old Glory ran out 29-15 winners over the Ontario Blues in their final exhibition game of the 2019 season.
