= Allan Mwayenga =

Zimbabwean cricketer (born 1982)

Personal information
- Born: 28 June 1982 (age 44); Harare, Zimbabwe
- Relatives: Waddington Mwayenga (brother)
- Source: ESPNcricinfo, 7 December 2016

Allan Mwayenga (born 28 June 1982) is a Zimbabwean former cricketer. He played twenty first-class matches between 2001 and 2005.

== Career ==
Mwayenga joined first-class cricket via an atypical path. His interest in the sport was triggered around the age of 13, coinciding with his father's association with St. John's College, Harare.

Observation of Bill Flower's coaching sessions at the college stimulated both Allan and his brother, Waddington's interest in cricket. The brothers honed their skills at Vainona High School, where Allan's performance highlights include an eight-wicket innings against Gateway High School and a century scored against Lord Malvern High School.

Allan's experience in representative cricket was limited to a brief stint with the Mashonaland Under-19 team in 1998. Following his school years, he qualified as a cricket coach from Harare Sports Club and worked with the Zimbabwe Cricket Union. He later joined Old Georgians Sports Club and subsequently Country Club in the realm of club cricket.

== See also ==
- CFX Academy cricket team
