= Archbishop Spalding High School =

Private, coeducational school in Severn, Maryland, US

Location
- 8080 New Cut Road; Severn, (Anne Arundel County), Maryland 21144-2399; United States; 39°7′29″N 76°38′49″W

Information
- Type: Private, coeducational
- Motto: "One In Christ"
- Religious affiliation: Roman Catholic
- Established: 1966
- CEEB code: 210-583
- President: Shannon Gilligan
- Principal: Regina O’Hara
- Chaplain: Thomas Ryan
- Faculty: 121
- Grades: 9–12
  - Grade 9: 345
  - Grade 10: 334
  - Grade 11: 322
  - Grade 12: 295
- Average class size: 23 (2017-2018)
- Campus size: 52-acre (210,000 m^{2})
- Colors: Red and white
- Athletics conference: MIAA / IAAM
- Mascot: Cavalier
- Nickname: Spalding
- Team name: Cavaliers
- Rival: St. Mary's High School Calvert Hall College High School Mount Saint Joseph High School McDonogh School
- Accreditation: Middle States Association of Colleges and Schools
- National ranking: 229
- Publication: Spalding Magazine
- Newspaper: The Spalding Spirit
- Yearbook: Crossroads
- Tuition: $21,650.00 (2025-2026)
- Feeder schools: Monsignor Slade Elementary School, School of the Incarnation, St. Mary's Elementary School. St. John the Evangelist, St. Pius X Regional School
- Affiliation: Archdiocese of Baltimore
- Admissions director: Bonnie Klemm
- Aquinas coordinator: Jeanine Kandrac
- Athletic director: Jonathan Mellinger
- Alumni director: Carol Gordon
- Guidance director: Claire Lamy
- Website: www.archbishopspalding.org

Archbishop Spalding High School is a private, Catholic co-educational high school located in Severn, Maryland, USA. It is located in the Roman Catholic Archdiocese of Baltimore. Most of its students live in Annapolis, Crownsville, Arnold, Pasadena, Severna Park, Crofton, Millersville, Glen Burnie, or Davidsonville in Anne Arundel County. Some also travel from southern Baltimore County, east Prince George's County and parts of Howard County. Spalding has numerous clubs for student involvement and/or academic competition, including Academic Bowl, Mock Trial, Strategic Gaming, HOPE (Help Our Planet Earth) and a NAIMUN award-winning Model United Nations team. It also has many competitive sports teams, such as rugby, soccer, cheerleading, dance, basketball, softball, American football, ice hockey, baseball, lacrosse, track and cross country. These athletic teams compete in the MIAA and the IAAM Conferences. The school sponsors a highly competitive music program, in which students participate in interstate competitions each year. Archbishop Spalding's mascot is the Cavalier.

== Background ==
Archbishop Spalding was established in 1963 as an all-girls high school called Holy Trinity High School. When the school moved to its present location in 1966, it was renamed Martin Spalding High School in honor of the seventh archbishop of Baltimore. Its name was changed to Archbishop Spalding High School in 1986. The school has been coeducational since 1973.

In May 2003, the school acquired the adjacent 22-acre (89,000 m^{2}) Upton Farm property, enlarging the school's campus to 52-acre (210,000 m^{2}). The addition of a new arts and technology wing was completed in September 2009.

== Campus/facilities ==
The school's facilities include 50 academic classrooms and four science laboratories. Its library maintains a collection of approximately 14,000 books and 24 desktop computers for student research. An entire wing of the school is networked for wireless computing. The school also has an IMAC laboratory, two personal computer laboratories and a Project Lead the Way Engineering program. All classrooms have access to video and computer projection equipment for visual presentations. The auditorium, with 1,200 seats, provides a location for school wide assemblies, as well as theatre and music productions. A new auditorium was built in 2017, allowing for more space. A chapel is available for use by students, parents and faculty.

The school has seven athletic fields. Its main athletic stadium has an all-weather turf field, eight-lane track, seating for 2,000 and a video scoreboard. A second all-weather turf field was installed in 2016 based on the generous donations and efforts of a local vendor and parent. The main gymnasium seats 1,100 and a secondary gymnasium seats 500.

An outdoor area known as the Senior Garden is traditionally reserved for use by senior students during their lunch breaks.

== Sports ==
Archbishop Spalding competes in the Maryland Interscholastic Athletic Association (MIAA) in boys' sports and in the Interscholastic Athletic Association of Maryland (IAAM) in girls' sports, against Baltimore-area schools. It plays in either the "A" or "B" divisions of these leagues.

== Performance groups ==
Archbishop Spalding has a number of performance groups, including instrumental and vocal ensembles. Instrumental groups include a guitar ensemble, string ensemble, jazz band, concert band, symphonic band and wind ensemble. Vocal groups include advanced women's chorus, girls' chorale, jazz harmony, chromosome Y and vocal ensemble. AP Music Theory is offered as an elective class in the curriculum. In 2007 at the national Musicfest in Orlando, Florida, Archbishop Spalding was awarded "Grand Band Champion", and was thus the overall national winner for that week's competition.

Several instrumental and vocal scholarships are available to incoming students upon audition.

== Notable alumni ==
- Zach Abey, United States Naval Academy quarterback
- Dylan Beard (born 1998), American hurdler
- Kyle Berkshire, Long drive champion
- Tamar Braxton, singer
- Jahmeer Carter, NFL defensive tackle
- Julius Chestnut, professional football player
- Mansoor Delane, NFL cornerback for the Kansas City Chiefs
- Kyle Dixon, professional lacrosse player
- Mike Flanagan, film director, writer, producer
- Rudy Gay, professional basketball player
- Jimi Haha, Jimmie's Chicken Shack's lead singer
- Nick Kuhl, professional rugby union player
- Amy Langville, basketball player and mathematician
- Chris Lucas, LoCash Cowboys, singer, songwriter, recording artist
- Steven Manders, professional wrestler and former college football player
- Christine Nairn, professional soccer player
- Malik Washington, college football quarterback for the Maryland Terrapins
- Cam Whitmore, basketball player

== See also ==
- National Catholic Educational Association
