= Peter Cuong Franklin =

Vietnamese-American chef

- Born: Outside of Da Lat, South Vietnam
- Education: Yale University (BS); University of Adelaide (MA); Le Cordon Bleu

Peter Cuong Franklin is a Vietnamese American chef and founder of Ănăn Saigon in Ho Chi Minh City, Vietnam, and Chôm Chôm in Hong Kong, specializing in "Cuisine Mới" (new Vietnamese cuisine). Born in Da Lat, Vietnam, Franklin's mother Nguyễn Thị Như Thừa operated a noodle shop. Franklin fled Ho Chi Minh City as a child refugee on April 29, 1975 during the Fall of Saigon. He was later adopted by an American family, attending Fairfield College Preparatory School and Yale University.

== Career ==
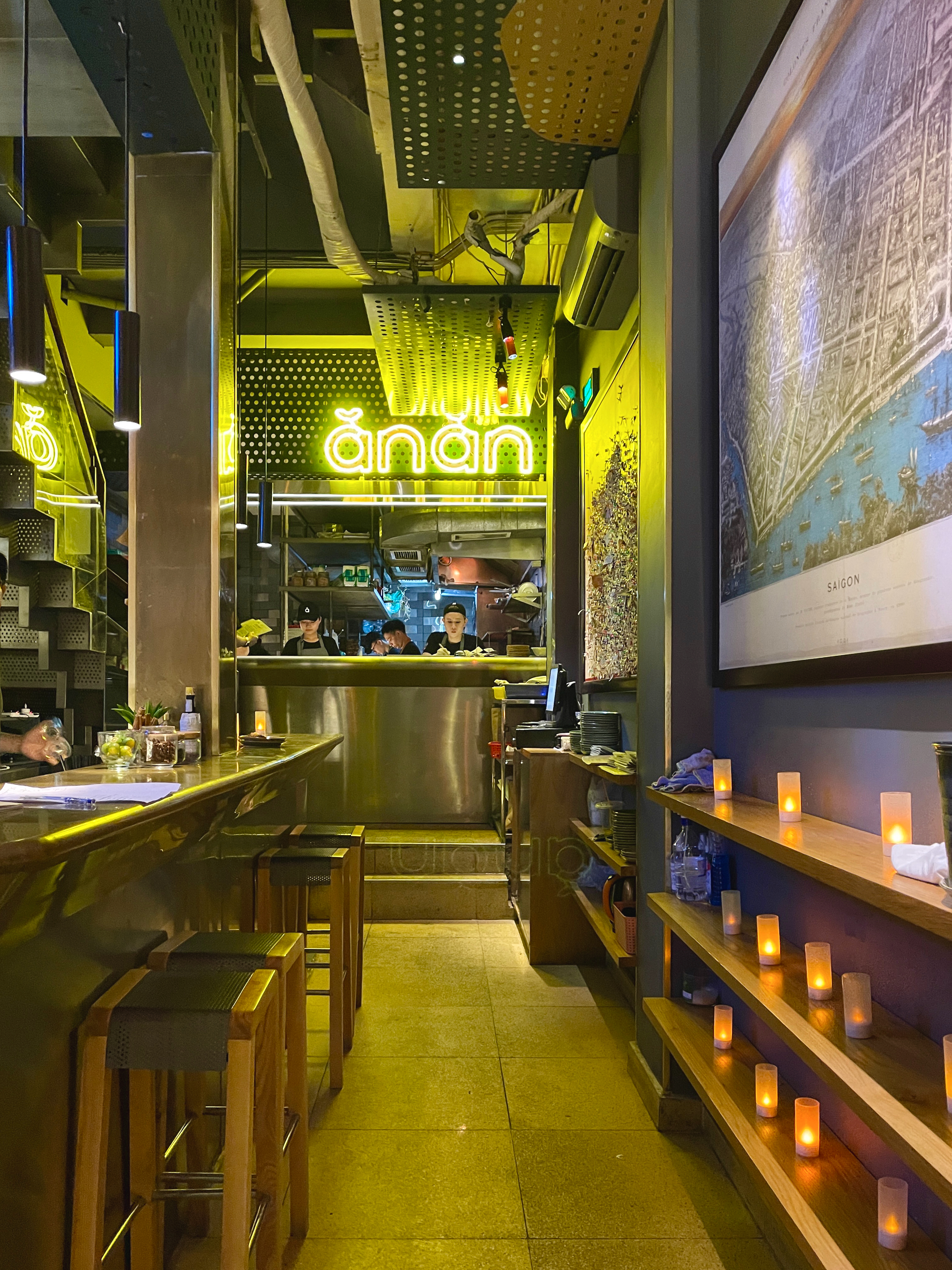
Ănăn Saigon, Franklin's flagship restaurant in District 1, Ho Chi Minh City

Franklin worked at Morgan Stanley as an investment banker prior to enrolling at Le Cordon Bleu in 2008. He trained as a chef at Nahm in Bangkok, Caprice in Hong Kong, and Next and Alinea in Chicago. Franklin opened Chôm Chôm in Hong Kong's SoHo district in 2011.

In 2017, Franklin opened Ănăn Saigon, a modern Vietnamese restaurant located in a tube house in Ho Chi Minh City's Ton That Dam old market (chợ cũ Tôn Thất Đạm). Ănăn was the first restaurant in Ho Chi Minh City to be awarded Asia's 50 Best Restaurants in 2021, and was ranked 40 on Asia’s 50 Best Restaurants in 2023. In 2023, Ănăn was awarded 1 star in the inaugural Vietnam Michelin Guide.

== Restaurants ==
Active Restaurants

- Ănăn Saigon
- Nhậu Nhậu
- Chôm Chôm

Closed Restaurants

- Viet Kitchen
