= George Sucher =

US international rugby union player

- Born: March 6, 1969 (age 57) Philadelphia, United States
- Height: 6 ft 0 in (183 cm)
- Weight: 220 lb (100 kg)
- School: St. Joseph's Prep School
- University: James Madison University

Rugby union career
- Position: Prop
International career
Years	Team	Apps	(Points)
1998–99	United States	15	(5)

George Sucher (born March 6, 1969) is an American former international rugby union player.

Sucher grew up in Philadelphia, Pennsylvania, and attended St. Joseph's Preparatory School. He was on the wrestling team at James Madison University, which is where he picked up rugby union.

A prop, Sucher competed for the Washington Rugby Football Club and made his United States debut in 1998. He played all three of the team's pool matches at the 1999 Rugby World Cup and was capped 15 times in total for his country.

== See also ==
- List of United States national rugby union players
