= West Potomac Rugby Football Club =

(United States) West Potomac RFC
- Full name: West Potomac Rugby Football Club
- Union: USA Rugby
- Nickname: West Pot
- Founded: 1963
- Ground: West Potomac Park
- League: Potomac Rugby Union Men's Division III
1st kit	2nd kit

Official website
- www.westpotrugby.com

West Potomac RFC is the second oldest active men's rugby union team in Washington, D.C., and the 2007 Potomac Rugby Union (PRU) Division III Men's Champion.

== History ==
=== Formation/SAIS RFC ===
West Potomac was founded in 1963 by a group of British Naval Officers enrolled in a year-long course in international diplomacy at the Johns Hopkins University School of International Studies (SAIS) and was originally called the SAIS RFC. During the first years, the original group of players recruited some USMC officers also taking courses in International Diplomacy and various SAIS students to the team. By 1973 many of the founding members had graduated and left the city, so the club changed its name to West Potomac Rugby Football Club after its practice and match pitch at West Potomac Park.

=== 1974-1999 ===
During this time, West Potomac continued to compete in the Mid-Atlantic region as well as participating in international rugby tours to Barbados, South Africa, Ireland, France, and the Bahamas.

=== Recent History ===
In 2000, West Potomac won the PRU Men's DIII Championship and the club was profiled in a Rugby Magazine article that discussed the club's history and its strong ties to the armed forces. The club was featured in Rugby Magazine the following year as well, this time as the "Tullamore Dew Team of the Month" for May 2002. Since then, the club has been featured in articles appearing in The Washington Post and Voice of the Hill, as well as additional Rugby Magazine stories.

West Potomac RFC became a 501(c)(3) non-profit organization in 2002 and incorporated under the name DC Rugby, Inc. In addition to overseeing the activities of West Potomac RFC, DC Rugby works with organizations in and around the D.C.-Metro area to promote the sport of rugby.

After losing only one match during 2006 PRU regular season competition, West Potomac went undefeated in Fall 2007 to once again win the DIII men's championship and secure a berth in the Mid-Atlantic Rugby Football Union playoffs for the third time in the past four years. During the 2007 season, the club finished 9-0 and outscored opponents 231 to 17.
