= Waddington Mwayenga =

Zimbabwean cricketer (born 1984)

Personal information
- Batting: Right-handed
- Bowling: Right-arm medium
- Relatives: Allan Mwayenga (brother)

Career statistics
Competition	Test	ODI
Matches	1	3
Runs scored	15	1
Batting average	15.00	0.50
100s/50s	0/0	0/0
Top score	14*	1
Balls bowled	126	126
Wickets	1	1
Bowling average	79.00	157.00
5 wickets in innings	0	0
10 wickets in match	0	0
Best bowling	1/79	1/61
Catches/stumpings	0/–	2/–
- Source: Cricinfo, 11 February 2006

Waddington Mwayenga (born 20 June 1984) is a Zimbabwean-Australian former cricketer. He is now based in Australia and works as a bus driver.

Mwayenga became an Australian citizen in 2014. He is a brother of Allan Mwayenga.

== Career ==
Mwayenga was primarily a medium pace bowler and played his county cricket for Worcestershire 2nd XI. Waddington spents summer playing at Nottinghamshire Cricket Club, Radcliffe-On-Trent, and has moved on to Australia for the winter before being expected to return to England for summer.

His Test debut came in the second Test against Indian cricket team in 2005/06.
