= Robbie Bordley =

American rugby union player (born c. 1947)

- Full name: Robinson M. Bordley
- Born: c. 1947 (age 78–79)
- School: Landon School
- University: Princeton University

Rugby union career
- Position(s): Fly-half; Fullback
Amateur team(s)
Years	Team	Apps	(Points)
1970–c. 1985	Washington RFC		
- Correct as of April 16, 2019
International career
Years	Team	Apps	(Points)
1976–1978	United States	5	(0)
- Correct as of April 16, 2019

Robinson M. Bordley (born c. 1947) is an American former rugby union player who played as a fly-half and fullback for the United States men's national team. He served as captain of the national team in its first two modern-era test matches in 1976.

== Early life and club rugby career ==
Bordley was born circa 1947, the eldest son of Robert Austin Joseph Bordley and Martha Ann Bordley (born Robinson). Bordley attended Landon School, graduating in 1966. During his time as a student at Landon, Bordley was a multi-sport athlete and earned 17 varsity letters. Bordley then attended Princeton University, where he was a member of the university's football and lacrosse teams, earning all-Ivy League honors in each sport. Bordley played at wide receiver for the football team and also returned punts and kicks. Bordley graduated from Princeton in 1970 with a Bachelor of Arts degree in political science.

After graduating from Princeton, Bordley joined the Washington Rugby Football Club (RFC) in 1970 and played with the team for more than a decade. During his time with Washington RFC, Bordley served as team captain, and was also selected for and captained representative teams with the Potomac Rugby Union and Eastern Rugby Union (ERU). In 1976, Bordley joined the ERU All Stars on a tour of South Africa. The following year, he returned to South Africa to play for an invitational international all star team at the then-newly renovated Loftus Versfeld Stadium. During his tenure with Washington RFC and the United States men's national team, Bordley studied at American University and earned a master's degree in history.

== International rugby career ==
Bordley made his debut for the United States men's national team (Eagles) on January 31, 1976, starting at fly-half and serving as captain, in the Eagles' 24–12 defeat to Australia. Bordley served as the Eagles' captain during this match and in a June 1976 match (in which he started at fullback) against France—the Eagles' first two test matches of the modern-era. Bordley made three additional test match appearances representing the United States through 1978, but he did not score during his five match career with the team.

== Professional career ==
In 1970, Bordley joined the faculty at Landon School. In 1975, Bordley became the head coach of the school's boys' lacrosse team. Over the course of 42 seasons, Bordley led the team to a total of 655 victories, making him the fifth winningest coach in United States high school boys' lacrosse history, as of April 2019. After the conclusion of the 2017–18 school year, Bordley retired from his head coaching and full-time teaching positions. While at the school, Bordley also coached junior-varsity soccer and worked as offensive coordinator of the varsity football team.

== Personal life and honors ==
Bordley married his wife, Donna, in 1977. Together they have three children: John Robinson "J.R.", Austin, and Claire, all of whom have played lacrosse at the collegiate level.

Over the course of his life, Bordley has received numerous awards and honors. He was inducted into the U.S. Rugby Hall of Fame in 2013 and the U.S. Lacrosse Hall of Fame (Potomac Chapter) in 2004. He has also been nominated for membership in the U.S. Lacrosse National Hall of Fame. On September 13, 2003, Landon School dedicated and named Robinson M. Bordley Stadium in his honor.
