= Kurt C. Schlichting =

Kurt C. Schlichting (born c. 1948) is the E. Gerald Corrigan Endowed Chair in the Humanities and Social Sciences and professor of sociology and anthropology at Fairfield University in the United States. He was a recipient of a Fairfield University Distinguished Faculty/Administrator Award in 2003.

== Education ==
Schlichting received his bachelor's degree from Fairfield University in 1970 and his master's degree and a doctorate from New York University.

== Career ==
Schlichting is the author of Grand Central Terminal: Railroads, Architecture and Engineering in New York (Johns Hopkins University Press, 2001), for which he received the 2002 Best Professional /Scholarly Book: Architecture & Urbanism Award from the Association of American Publishers. His book was the basis of "Grand Central," a history series American Experience documentary on PBS produced by filmmaker Michael Epstein. Schlichting served as an on-screen interviewee and as an Academic Advisor to the documentary film.

Schlichting is the founder and director of the Fairfield County Research Center which involves Fairfield University faculty and students in research projects for local governments and non-profit organizations. Schlichting was also the co-founder and vice president of The Analysis Group Inc., now Greenberg Quinlan Rosner Research where he worked as a political consultant to Senator Christopher Dodd, Governor William O'Neill and the Connecticut Democratic Party.
