= Pittsburgh Harlequins =

(United States) Pittsburgh Harlequins RFC
- Full name: Pittsburgh Harlequins Rugby Football Club
- Union: USA Rugby, Mid-Atlantic Rugby Football Union, Potomac Rugby Union, Capital Geographical Union
- Founded: 1973
- Location: Cheswick (outside Pittsburgh), Pennsylvania, United States
- Ground: Founders Field
- President: Tyler Miller

Official website
- www.pittsburghharlequins.org

The Pittsburgh Harlequins is an American rugby union that was founded in 1973. The team is a member of the USA Rugby Football Union, the Mid-Atlantic Rugby Football Union, and the Potomac Rugby Union.

== History ==
As of 2014, the team had forty active players, and has had over 300 alumni members since its founding by University of Pittsburgh law students. It advanced to the Final 16 of the National Championships in 1999 and 2004.

The Pittsburgh Harlequins Rugby Football Association was created in 1995 to support the club, its facilities, and rugby youth outreach programs targeting underprivileged youth. In 1997, the RFA bought 12 acres (49,000 m^{2}) of land in Indiana Township, Pennsylvania and constructed two full-sized lighted rugby or soccer pitches with an adjacent parking lot and clubhouse.

The team helps to develop rugby in the Pittsburgh area through youth outreach programs and supports high school rugby teams, university teams such as the Carnegie Mellon Rugby Football Club, and other age-grade all-star teams.
