= Washington Rugby Football Club =

Division I rugby union team in Washington, DC

Washington RFC
- Full name: Washington Rugby Football Club
- Union: USA Rugby
- Nickname(s): Washington Rugby, WRFC
- Founded: 1963
- Location: Washington D.C.
- Ground: The Fields at RFK
- President: Harry Higginbottom
- Coach: (United States) Thretton Palamo (United States) Jamason Faʻanana-Schultz
- League(s): Division I, Division III

Official website
- www.washingtonrugby.org

Washington Rugby Football Club (WRFC) is a USA Rugby club men's Division I rugby union team based in Washington, DC. It was formed in February 1963.

The team founded the annual Cherry Blossom tournament in 1966. WRFC plays in the Mid-Atlantic Conference in the Capital Geographical Union. WRFC won its first 2021 Capital Region Champion and its first debut in the Mid-Atlantic Conference for Division II. In 2022, WRFC moved from Division II to Division I Rugby.

== Notable players ==
Note: caps and participation are accurate as of 23 November 2025

=== Australia Wallabies ===
- Mitchell Cox, scrum-half, two international caps

=== USA Eagles ===
- Bill Bernhard 1987, Fullback
- Rob Blackmore 1988(B), 1989, Prop
- Robinson Bordley 1975, 1977–1978, Fly-half, Fullback
- Mike Conroy 1977, Center
- Mike Coyner 1998-1999, Flank, 7s
- Al Dekin 1993, 7s
- Chris Doherty 1984, 1987, Center, 7s
- Michael Lancaster 1978, Prop
- Rory Lewis 1990-1991, Wing, 7s
- Dan Lyle 1993(B) 1993, Lock, 7s, 15s Captain
- Gerry McDonald 1988(B) 1989 1995-1996, Prop; Scotland U21s
- John Robbins 1988(B) Hooker
- Paul Sheehy 1991-1993, Fullback, 7s; 1991 World Cup Player
- Tom Smith 1978, 1980, Wing
- Scott Stephens 1991-1993, Flank, 7s
- George Sucher 1998, Prop; 1999 World Cup
- Kevin Swords 1985-1986, Lock
- Dan Wack 1976-1978, 1980, Center
- Ken Wood 1977-1978, 1983, Coach/Manager
- James Cassidy 2000(B), Prop
- Francois Viljoen 2004-Current, Fullback
- Owen Lentz 2006, Hooker
- PJ Komonognam 2006, USA 7s
- Andrew "Tui" Osbourne 2006, USA 7s

=== Capital Selects ===
- Thomas Demetriou- 8 Man/Lock
- Stephen Okala- Flanker
- Johnathan Webster- Flanker
- Ray Gajkowski- Lock
- Sam Follansbee- Flanker/Wing
- Erikk Shupp- Hooker
- Camilo Moraga-Lewy - Flanker
- Leo Fangmayer- Flyhalf
- Austin Park- Wing
- Harry Higginbottom- Prop

== Honours ==
- Division 1 ERU Champions - 1988
  - Blume Trophy - 1971, 1974
- Division 1 MARFU 15s Champions - 1987, 1995
  - Division 1 MARFU Sevens Champions - 2003
- Division 1 PRU Champions - 1985, 1986, 1987, 1988, 1989, 1990, 1991, 1992, 1993
- Division 2 Capital Region Champions -2021
