= Norfolk Blues =

(United States) Norfolk City Blues RFC
- Full name: Norfolk City Blues Rugby Football Club
- Union: USA Rugby
- Nickname(s): Blues
- Founded: 1978
- President: (United States) David Paradiso
- Coach(es): (United States) Christopher Porter (Wales) Jeremy Frayne
- League(s): USARugby Capital Rugby Union Div 1
1st kit	2nd kit

Official website
- www.bluesrugby.org

The Norfolk Blues are a Mid-Atlantic Rugby Football Union Division I/Championship Division Club in Norfolk, Virginia. Founded in the Spring of 1978 as a result of a merger between the Norfolk Rugby and Norfolk Irish Rugby Clubs. Through the Spring of 2010, the Blues have accumulated a first side 15's record of 509-190-14. Their home playing fields are Lafayette Park in Norfolk and the Virginia Beach Sportsplex in Virginia Beach.

The team symbol is the Norfolk Mace, a large, ornamental (pure silver) mace that was crafted by London silversmith Fuller White and was presented to the 'Borough of Norfolk' in 1754 by the acting Royal Governor of Virginia, Robert Dinwiddie (1693–1770) and is still used today for public ceremonies. The Blues team colors are Blue and Gold; the colors of the City of Norfolk.

The Norfolk Blues are named after the Norfolk Light Artillery Blues. Originally formed in 1829 as a state militia company and prestigious social club. The Blues served through the entire war and were one of the few military units that actually increased in size, during the conflict. The Blues took an oath to "never surrender" and did not lose a single man to desertion throughout the course of the American Civil War. The NLAB's were merged with the "First Company Richmond Howitzers" (organized on 9 November 1859) and the Portsmouth Light Artillery [organized on 15 February 1809] to become the modern day 1st Battalion, 111th Field Artillery of the Virginia National Guard.

The Norfolk Blues are a member club of the Virginia Rugby Union, the Mid-Atlantic Rugby Football Union, and the USA Rugby Football Union.
