= Canada East (rugby union) =

Former national representative rugby union teams from Canada

- Union: Rugby Canada
- Nickname(s): East
- Founded: 2005
- Disbanded: 2008
- Coach(es): Simon Blanks Brian Krawetz
- Captain(s): Derek Daypuck
- Most caps: Derek Daypuck (6)
- Most appearances: Derek Daypuck (6)
- Top scorer: Derek Daypuck (78)
Team kit

First match
- USA Falcons 14–29 Canada East (20 May 2006)

Largest win
- USA Hawks 11–34 Canada East (27 May 2006)

Largest defeat
- USA Falcons 14–29 Canada East (20 May 2006)

Canada East was one of two national representative rugby union teams from Canada that competed in the North America 4 Series. When the North America 4 was replaced by the Canadian Rugby Championship and Americas Rugby Championship in 2009, Canada East ceased to exist.

== History ==
=== Formation ===
Canada East was founded in 2005 by the NA4 Committee. The NA4 Committee is made up of the International Rugby Board, Rugby Canada and USA Rugby. The committee was charged with operating and financing the four North American teams (the others being the USA Hawks, USA Falcons, and Canada West. By 2008, however, each franchise was to be sold and become privately owned.

=== Inaugural competition ===
East's first ever match occurred on 20 May 2006 during the inaugural NA 4 Series. They faced the USA Falcons in pool play and were defeated 14–29. They finished the competition with a 2–2–1 record in pool play and had an average of 27 points scored and 22 points scored against per match. Derek Daypuck of the Castaway Wanderers captained the squad during the inaugural campaign.

==== PARMA Select XV ====
The PARMA Select XV is the All-Star squad composed of the best players of the competition as determined by the Pan-American Rugby Media Association. Dan Pletch, Stu Ault, Sean-Michael Stephen, and Derek Daypuck were selected to the starting XV. Jarod Selby was named as a reserve.
