= USA Hawks =

(United States) USA Hawks
- Union: USA Rugby
- Nickname: Hawks
- Founded: 2005
- Coach: (United States) Brendan Keane
- Captain: (United States) Matt Wyatt
- Most caps: (United States) Jason Kelly (4)
- Most appearances: (United States) Jason Kelly (4)
- Top scorer: (United States) Jason Kelly (34)
Team kit

First match
- Canada West 98–0 Hawks (20 May 2006)

Largest win
- USA Falcons 22–33 Hawks (24 May 2006)

Largest defeat
- Canada West 98–0 Hawks (20 May 2006)

Official website
- www.narugby.com/thawks.html

The USA Hawks is a USA Rugby and MLR funded rugby development side, in 2023 a squad was formed to play a number of South American teams. It was one of two national representative rugby union teams from the United States that competed in the North America 4 Series.

== History ==
=== Formation ===
The Hawks were founded in 2005 by the NA4 Committee. The NA4 Committee is made up of the International Rugby Board, Rugby Canada and USA Rugby. The committee is charged with operating and financing the four North American teams (the others being the USA Falcons, Canada East, and Canada West). In 2008, however, each franchise will be sold and become privately owned.

=== Inaugural Competition: 2006 North America 4 Series ===
The Hawks' first ever match occurred on 20 May 2006 during the inaugural NA 4 Series. They faced Canada West in pool play and were defeated 46–7. The Hawks earned their first win in their following match in the competition against the Falcons, defeating them 33–22. They finished the competition with a 1–4–0 record and had an average of 14 points scored and 46 points scored against per match. Matt Wyatt of Philadelphia Whitemarsh RFC captained the squad during the inaugural campaign.

==== PARMA Select XV ====
The PARMA Select XV is the All-Star squad composed of the best players of the competition as determined by the Pan-American Rugby Media Association. Matt Potchad was the lone Hawk selection and was named as a reserve.

== 2023 squad ==
In early 2023 MLR and USA Rugby announced a 28 man squad for matches against SRA teams Chile XV, Pampas, Cobras Brazil XV and Yacare. As well as a match against Argentinian development team, Desarrollo and two matches against the Argentine u20 side.

=== Forwards ===
Props

Hunter Blanchard - Houston SaberCats 6′ / 260lbs / 25yrs

Elijah Hayes - Utah Warriors 6’3″ / 265lbs / 25yrs

Doyle Hedgepeth - New York Ironworkers 6′ / 245lbs / 24yrs

Oliver Kane - San Diego Legion 6’4″ / 270lbs / 26yrs

Ivan Pula - New England Free Jacks 6’1″ / 255lbs / 25yrs

Trent Rogers - NOLA Gold 6′ / 285lbs / 23yrs

==== Hookers ====
Isaac Bales - Rugby ATL 5’9″ / 245lbs / 23yrs

Tristan Cole - Rocky Gorge / Old Glory 6′ / 220lbs / 19yrs

Sam Faoagali - Perth Bayswater 5’10” / 240lbs / 20yrs

Second Rows

Matt Gelhaus - Rugby ATL 6’5″ / 240lbs / 22yrs

Lucas Gramlick - American Raptors 6’8″ / 280lbs / 22yrs

Bill Whiteside - New York Ironworkers 6’5″ / 235lbs / 24yrs

Maxime Wilson - Bourges / Houston SaberCats 6’7″ / 255lbs / 21yrs

Backrows

Aminae Amiatu-Tanoi - San Diego Legion 6’3″ / 230lbs / 18yrs

Isaiah Caver - Utah Warriors 6’5″ / 200lbs / 19yrs

Aidan Christians - Western Province 6’2″ / 210lbs / 19yrs

Ethan Fryer - New England Free Jacks 6’2″ / 210lbs / 20yrs

Marnus Spangenberg - Houston SaberCats 6’3″ / 210lbs / 23yrs

=== Backs ===
Scrumhalfs

Evan Conlon - Rugby ATL 5’9″ / 185lbs / 23yrs

Tai Kauwe - Utah Warriors 5’10” / 195lbs / 24yrs

Flyhalfs

Trace Bolstad - Houston SaberCats 6’2″ / 200lbs / 28yrs

Chase Suznevich - Queens Charlotte 6’1″ / 175lbs / 23yrs

Coleson Warner - Utah Warriors 5’10” / 175lbs / 24yrs

Centers

Shane Fata - New England Free Jacks 5’9″ / 195lbs / 20yrs

Jason Tidwell - Dallas Jackals 5’9″ / 180lbs / 23yrs

Outside Backs

Kyle Fulton - Dallas Jackals 5’9″ / 195lbs / 23yrs

D’Montae Noble - Houston SaberCats 5’8″ / 185lbs / 25yrs

Christian Olney - NOLA Gold 6’2″ / 200lbs / 23yrs
