= Canada West (rugby union) =

Canadian rugby team

- Union: Rugby Canada
- Nickname(s): West
- Founded: 2005
- Disbanded: 2008
- Coach(es): Tony Medina
- Captain(s): Ed Fairhust
- Most caps: Ed Fairhust (5)
- Most appearances: Ed Fairhust (5)
- Top scorer: Ed Fairhust (50)
Team kit

First match
- USA Hawks 0–98 Canada West (20 May 2006)

Largest win
- USA Hawks 0–98 Canada West (20 May 2006)

Largest defeat
- Canada East 34–18 Canada West (20 May 2006)

Canada West was one of two national representative rugby union teams from Canada that competed in the North America 4 Series. When the North America 4 was replaced by the Canadian Rugby Championship and Americas Rugby Championship in 2009, Canada West ceased to exist.

== History ==
=== Formation ===
Canada West was founded in 2005 by the NA4 Committee. The NA4 Committee was made up of the International Rugby Board, Rugby Canada and USA Rugby. The committee was charged with operating and financing the four North American teams (the others being the USA Hawks, USA Falcons, and Canada East. By 2008, however, each franchise was to be sold and become privately owned.

=== Inaugural competition ===
West's first ever match occurred on 20 May 2006 during the inaugural NA 4 Series. They faced the USA Hawks in pool play and won by a score of 98–0. This match was the most lopsided of the competition. They finished the competition with a 3–1–1 record in pool play and had an average of 43 points scored and 19 points scored against per match. They advanced to the finals in elimination play and defeated the Falcons 31–20 to be crowned champions of the competition. Ed Fairhust of the Castaway Wanderers captained the squad during the inaugural campaign.
