= USA Falcons (2005–2006) =

(United States) USA Falcons
- Union: USA Rugby
- Nickname: Falcons
- Founded: 2005
- Coach: (New Zealand) Jim Love
- Captain: (South Africa) Patrick Bell
- Most caps: (United States) Jason Pye (6)
- Most appearances: (United States) Jason Pye (6)
- Top scorer: (South Africa) Patrick Bell (29)
1st kit	2nd kit

First match
- Canada East 14–29 Falcons (20 May 2006)

Largest win
- USA Hawks 17–45 Falcons (26 July 2006)

Largest defeat
- Canada West 31–20 Falcons (29 July 2006)

Official website
- www.narugby.com/tfalcons.html

The USA Falcons was one of two national representative rugby union teams from the United States that competed in the North America 4 Series.

== History ==
=== Formation ===
The Falcons were founded in 2005 by the NA4 Committee. The NA4 Committee is made up of the International Rugby Board, Rugby Canada and USA Rugby. The committee is charged with operating and financing the four North American teams (the others being the USA Hawks, Canada East, and Canada West. In 2008, however, each franchise will be sold and become privately owned.

=== Inaugural competition: 2006 North America 4 Series ===
The Falcons' first ever match occurred on 20 May 2006 during the inaugural NA 4 Series. They faced Canada East in pool play and won the match 29-14. They finished the competition with a 3-2-0 record and had an average of 29 points scored and 23 points scored against per match. They faced Canada West in the championship final and lost by a score of 20-31 on 29 July. South African native Patrick Bell, of Life University, captained the squad during the inaugural campaign.

==== PARMA Select XV ====
The PARMA Select XV is the all-star squad composed of the best players of the competition as determined by the Pan-American Rugby Media Association (PARMA). Patrick Bell, Hayden Mexted, Mark Aylor, Vaha Esikia, Andrew “Tui” Osborne, and Brian Barnard were selected to the starting XV. John Tarpoff, Alex Parker, Chad Erskine, and Jason Pye were named as reserves. Of the 22 spots on the PARMA XV, 10 were from the Falcons squad, the most of any NA4 club.

== 2006 squad ==
The 2006 NA4 squad was as follows

- Jarvis Albury - Arkansas State
- James Angus - Frederick
- Kevin Armstrong - Santa Monica Rugby Club
- Mark Aylor - Austin Blacks
- Brian Barnard - San Francisco Golden Gate
- Patrick Bell - Life
- Matt Brown - OPSB
- Chris Cowan - Santa Monica Rugby Club
- Aaron Davis - Santa Monica Rugby Club
- Vaha Esikia - Las Vegas Blackjacks
- Chad Erskine - OMBAC
- James Finau - Hayward
- Mike French - OMBAC
- Mark Griffin - Old Blue
- Carl Hansen - Olympic Club
- Jeff Hullinger - BYU
- Scott Jones - Chicago Lions
- Kimball Kjar - Dallas Harlequins
- Saimone Laulaupeaalu - Hayward
- Sean Kim - Charlotte Rugby Club
- Andrew Locke - USMA
- Hayden Mexted - St. Louis Bombers
- Andrew Osborne - Washington
- Alec Parker - Aspen
- Mike Petrie - Penn State
- Tony Petruzzella - Olympic Club
- Jason Pye - Utah
- David Rader - New York Athletic Club
- Ronald Rosser - Caly Poly
- Doug Rowe - Old Blue
- Brian Schoener - OPSB
- Kort Schubert - Cardiff
- Garry Sullivan - Life
- John Tarpoff - St. Louis Bombers
- Alipate Tuilevuka - BYU
- John Vitale - Chicago Lions
