= 2016 PRO Rugby season =

2016 PRO Rugby
- Countries: United States
- Date: 17 April – 31 July 2016
- Champions: Denver Stampede
- Runners-up: Ohio Aviators
- Matches played: 30
- Attendance: 51,696 (average 1,723 per match)
- Tries scored: 243 (average 8.1 per match)
- Top point scorer: Volney Rouse (San Francisco Rush); 131 points
- Top try scorer: Spike Davis (Ohio Aviators); 14 tries

Official website
- www.prorugby.org

The 2016 PRO Rugby season was the inaugural and only season of the PRO Rugby, contested by teams from the United States. The season ran from April to July 2016. This was the first season of professional rugby union in North America.

PRO Rugby contracted 102 players for its five teams. Of these 102 players, 54 have played international rugby, including 36 for the United States national rugby union team. About 30 players were picked from Pacific Rugby Premiership teams and 15 from Midwest Rugby Premiership teams.

== Competition format ==
Each team played a twelve match schedule with six matches at home and six away. Most matches took place on Sunday to give clubs and schools the chance to play on Saturday and Friday.

The league had a lighter schedule on June 5 and 12 (the 12th being during the three-week June international window). Those days had just one match. There was however a full slate on June 19 and 26 (both during the international window) and teams lost players to the United States, Canadian or other national teams during this time.

== Broadcasting ==
Matches were available for the 2016 inaugural season to stream through prorugby.org or on cable through ONE World Sports or Time Warner Cable Sports Channel. Initially selected matches were available free to all online through www.aol.com but this came to an inexplicable abrupt end. Through the league's official website all matches were streamed free to all viewers. ONE World Sports was offered by multiple cable and satellite providers and covered a range of sports, most notably a large selection of soccer.

== Teams and officials ==
Club	Metro area	Home ground	Capacity	Head coach	Captain
Denver Stampede	Denver, CO	CIBER Field (Note: Denver would also play two homes games at Infinity Park, Glendale, CO on April 17 and May 20.)	1,915	Sean O'Leary	Pedrie Wannenburg
Ohio Aviators	Columbus, OH	Memorial Park	3,000	Paule Barford	Jamie Mackintosh
Sacramento Express	Sacramento, CA	Bonney Field	11,442	Luke Gross	John Quill
San Diego Breakers	San Diego, CA	Torero Stadium	6,000	Ray Egan	Phil Mackenzie
San Francisco Rush	San Francisco, CA	Boxer Stadium	3,500	Paul Keeler	Patrick Latu

=== Match officials ===
PRO Rugby named the following five referees and three assistant referees to handle the regular-season games for the 2016 season.

Referees

- Leah Berard
- Scott Green
- Nick Ricono
- Derek Summers
- Kurt Weaver

Assistant referees

- Jamie Miller
- Marc Nelson
- George O'Neil

== Standings ==
2016 PRO Rugby season
Pos	Team	Pld	W	D	L	PF	PA	PD	B	Pts
1	Denver Stampede	12	10	0	2	403	273	+130	8	48
2	Ohio Aviators	12	9	0	3	476	273	+203	11	47
3	San Diego Breakers	12	4	0	8	335	413	−78	9	25
4	San Francisco Rush	12	4	0	8	339	454	−115	8	24
5	Sacramento Express	12	3	0	9	294	434	−140	6	18

=== Ladder progression ===
2016 PRO Rugby season
Team	W1	W2	W3	W4	W5	W6	W7	W8	W9	W10	W11	W12	W13	W14	W15	W16
Denver Stampede	4 (2nd)	9 (1st)	13 (1st)	13 (1st)	18 (1st)	23 (1st)	23 (1st)	27 (1st)	27 (1st)	27 (2nd)	31 (2nd)	31 (2nd)	36 (2nd)	41 (2nd)	46 (1st)	48 (1st)
Ohio Aviators	1 (3rd)	1 (4th)	6 (2nd)	11 (2nd)	12 (3rd)	17 (2nd)	17 (3rd)	17 (3rd)	22 (2nd)	27 (1st)	32 (1st)	37 (1st)	42 (1st)	42 (1st)	42 (2nd)	47 (2nd)
Sacramento Express	5 (1st)	5 (3rd)	5 (4th)	5 (4th)	5 (4th)	5 (4th)	5 (5th)	5 (5th)	5 (5th)	5 (5th)	5 (5th)	10 (5th)	11 (5th)	11 (5th)	16 (5th)	18 (5th)
San Diego Breakers	0 (4th)	5 (2nd)	6 (3rd)	11 (3rd)	15 (2nd)	15 (3rd)	20 (2nd)	21 (2nd)	22 (3rd)	23 (3rd)	23 (3rd)	23 (3rd)	23 (3rd)	24 (3rd)	25 (3rd)	25 (3rd)
San Francisco Rush	0 (5th)	0 (5th)	0 (5th)	1 (5th)	1 (5th)	3 (5th)	8 (4th)	8 (4th)	8 (4th)	12 (4th)	12 (4th)	12 (4th)	12 (4th)	17 (4th)	19 (4th)	24 (4th)
The table above shows a team's progression throughout the season. For each round, their cumulative points total is shown with the overall log position in brackets.
Key:	win	loss	draw	bye												

== Players ==
Note: Flags to the left of player names indicate national team as has been defined under World Rugby eligibility rules, or primary nationality for players who have not yet earned international senior caps.

=== Top points scorers ===
Rank	Player	Team	Points
1	(United States) Volney Rouse	San Francisco Rush	131
2	(Tonga) Kurt Morath	San Diego Breakers	120
3	(Italy) Mirco Bergamasco	Sacramento Express	114
4	(United States) Will Magie	Denver Stampede	113
5	(United States) Shaun Davies	Ohio Aviators	84

=== Top try scorers ===
Rank	Player	Team	Tries
1	(United States) Spike Davis	Ohio Aviators	14
2	(Chile) Sebastián Kalm	Ohio Aviators	9
3	(United States) Zach Fenoglio	Denver Stampede	8
4	(United States) Chad London	Denver Stampede	6
4	(Ireland) Dylan Fawsitt	Ohio Aviators	6
4	(Italy) Filippo Ferrarini	Ohio Aviators	6
4	(United States) Hanco Germishuys	Denver Stampede	6
4	(United States) Mike Te'o	San Diego Breakers	6
4	(South Africa) Pedrie Wannenburg	Denver Stampede	6

Updated: July 31, 2016

=== Overall points scorers ===
2016 PRO Rugby season
Player	Team	Total	Details			
Player	Team	Total	Tries	Conversions	Penalties	Drop Goals
Volney Rouse	San Francisco Rush	131	4	33	15	0
Kurt Morath	San Diego Breakers	120	0	15	30	0
Mirco Bergamasco	Sacramento Express	114	0	27	20	0
Will Magie	Denver Stampede	113	0	34	15	0
Shaun Davies	Ohio Aviators	84	0	27	10	0
Spike Davis	Ohio Aviators	70	14	0	0	0
Sebastian Kalm	Ohio Aviators	45	9	0	0	0
Zach Fenoglio	Denver Stampede	40	8	0	0	0
Robbie Shaw	Ohio Aviators	37	0	14	3	0
Kalei Konrad	San Diego Breakers	35	2	8	3	0
Chad London	Denver Stampede	30	6	0	0	0
Dylan Fawsitt	Ohio Aviators	30	6	0	0	0
Filippo Ferrarini	Ohio Aviators	30	6	0	0	0
Hanco Germishuys	Denver Stampede	30	6	0	0	0
Mike Te'o	San Diego Breakers	30	6	0	0	0
Pedrie Wannenburg	Denver Stampede	30	6	0	0	0
Alex Elkins	Ohio Aviators	25	5	0	0	0
David Tameilau	San Francisco Rush	25	5	0	0	0
Dominic Waldouck	Ohio Aviators	25	5	0	0	0
Jamie Mackintosh	Ohio Aviators	25	5	0	0	0
Maximo de Achaval	Denver Stampede	25	5	0	0	0
Orene Ai'i	San Francisco Rush	25	5	0	0	0
Viliame Iongi	San Francisco Rush	25	5	0	0	0
Devereaux Ferris	San Francisco Rush	20	4	0	0	0
Kyle Sumsion	Sacramento Express	20	4	0	0	0
Riekert Hattingh	Ohio Aviators	20	4	0	0	0
Timana Tahu	Denver Stampede	20	4	0	0	0
JP Eloff	Ohio Aviators	20	2	5	0	0
Ben Leatigaga	San Diego Breakers	15	3	0	0	0
Cecil Garber	San Diego Breakers	15	3	0	0	0
Jacob Finau	San Francisco Rush	15	3	0	0	0
John Quill	Sacramento Express	15	3	0	0	0
Langilangi Haupeakui	Sacramento Express	15	3	0	0	0
Martin Knoetze	Denver Stampede	15	3	0	0	0
Mike Garrity	Denver Stampede	15	3	0	0	0
Olive Kilifi	Sacramento Express	15	3	0	0	0
Phil Mackenzie	San Diego Breakers	15	3	0	0	0
Ata Malifa	Denver Stampede	12	2	1	0	0
Ahmad Harajly	Ohio Aviators	10	2	0	0	0
Bill Fukofuma	San Francisco Rush	10	2	0	0	0
Charlie Purdon	San Diego Breakers	10	2	0	0	0
Chris Saint	Sacramento Express	10	2	0	0	0
Christian Wiessing	Denver Stampede	10	2	0	0	0
Dustin Croy	Denver Stampede	10	2	0	0	0
Garrett Brewer	Sacramento Express	10	2	0	0	0
Jack O'Hara	San Francisco Rush	10	2	0	0	0
Logan Collins	Denver Stampede	10	2	0	0	0
Maka Tameilau	San Francisco Rush	10	2	0	0	0
Mason Baum	Ohio Aviators	10	2	0	0	0
Matt Hughston	Ohio Aviators	10	2	0	0	0
Michael Haley	San Francisco Rush	10	2	0	0	0
Mils Muliaina	San Francisco Rush	10	2	0	0	0
Pierce Dargan	Ohio Aviators	10	2	0	0	0
Ryan Matyas	San Diego Breakers	10	2	0	0	0
Sam Finau	San Francisco Rush	10	2	0	0	0
Takudzwa Ngwenya	San Diego Breakers	10	2	0	0	0
Tim Stanfill	San Diego Breakers	10	2	0	0	0
Tom Bliss	San Diego Breakers	10	2	0	0	0
Zachary Pangelinan	San Diego Breakers	10	2	0	0	0
Harry Bennett	Sacramento Express	10	0	2	1	1
Niku Kruger	Denver Stampede	8	1	0	1	0
Alec Gletzer	San Francisco Rush	5	1	0	0	0
Alex Hodgkinson	Sacramento Express	5	1	0	0	0
Andrew Suniula	San Diego Breakers	5	1	0	0	0
Cameron Falcon	Sacramento Express	5	1	0	0	0
Casey Rock	Denver Stampede	5	1	0	0	0
Cody Jerabek	Sacramento Express	5	1	0	0	0
Derrick Broussard	San Diego Breakers	5	1	0	0	0
Estaphan Tuimasanga	Sacramento Express	5	1	0	0	0
Hubert Buydens	San Diego Breakers	5	1	0	0	0
Jeffery Kalemani	San Diego Breakers	5	1	0	0	0
Jeremy Lenaerts	San Francisco Rush	5	1	0	0	0
Jope Motokana	Sacramento Express	5	1	0	0	0
Joe Taufete'e	San Diego Breakers	5	1	0	0	0
Kyle Baillie	Ohio Aviators	5	1	0	0	0
Lagikali Tavake	Sacramento Express	5	1	0	0	0
Luke White	Denver Stampede	5	1	0	0	0
Lynton Mare	Denver Stampede	5	1	0	0	0
Michael Al-Jiboori	Denver Stampede	5	1	0	0	0
Michael Reid	San Francisco Rush	5	1	0	0	0
Mose Timoteo	Denver Stampede	5	1	0	0	0
Nemia Qoro	Sacramento Express	5	1	0	0	0
Nicholas Wallace	Denver Stampede	5	1	0	0	0
Nick Blevins	San Francisco Rush	5	1	0	0	0
Nikola Bursic	San Diego Breakers	5	1	0	0	0
Patrick Latu	San Francisco Rush	5	1	0	0	0
Peter Dahl	Denver Stampede	5	1	0	0	0
Peter Malcolm	Ohio Aviators	5	1	0	0	0
Pono Haitsuka	San Diego Breakers	5	1	0	0	0
Ray Barkwill	Sacramento Express	5	1	0	0	0
Robert Meeson	Sacramento Express	5	1	0	0	0
Ronald Suniula	Ohio Aviators	5	1	0	0	0
Ryan Koewler	Sacramento Express	5	1	0	0	0
Shane Moore	Sacramento Express	5	1	0	0	0
Sione Tuihalamaka	San Diego Breakers	5	1	0	0	0
Siupeli Sakalia	San Francisco Rush	5	1	0	0	0
Tai Tuisamoa	San Diego Breakers	5	1	0	0	0
Taylor Howden	Ohio Aviators	5	1	0	0	0
Tokemoana Kefu	Sacramento Express	5	1	0	0	0
Valdemar Lee-Lo	Sacramento Express	5	1	0	0	0
Martini Talapusi	San Francisco Rush	3	0	0	1	0

Updated: September 6, 2016

=== Team of the season ===
The following shows the team of the season, as selected by various media outlets.

Pos	Rugby Today	Americas Rugby News
1	Jamie Mackintosh	Jamie Mackintosh
2	Zach Fenoglio	Zach Fenoglio
3	Chris Baumann	Olive Kilifi
4	Tai Tuisamoa	Tai Tuisamoa
5	Logan Collins	Brendan Daly
6	Kyle Sumsion	Sam Finau
7	Sebastian Kalm	Sebastian Kalm
8	Pedrie Wannenburg	Pedrie Wannenburg

Pos	Rugby Today	Americas Rugby News
9	Shaun Davies	Shaun Davies
10	Will Magie	Will Magie
11	Timana Tahu	Timana Tahu
12	Roland Suniula	Orene Ai'i
13	Orene Ai'i	Chad London
14	Spike Davis	Spike Davis
15	Mike Te'o	Mike Te'o

=== Player development ===
The following list shows PRO Rugby players who earned their debut cap for the U.S. national rugby team during the 2016 season:

- Angus MacLellan (June 25 vs Canada)
- Langilangi Haupeakui (June 25 vs Canada)

== Attendance ==
=== By team ===
These are the attendance records of each of the teams at the end of the home and away season. The table does not include finals series attendances.

Team	Hosted	Average	High	Low	Total
Sacramento Express	6	2,150	3,400	1,500	12,900
San Diego Breakers	6	1,916	2,500	1,500	11,500
Denver Stampede	6	1,941	2,346	1,500	11,646
Ohio Aviators	6	1,691	3,400	750	10,050
San Francisco Rush	6	916	1,700	700	5,500
League total	30	1,723	3,400	700	51,696

=== By week ===
Week	Total	Games	Avg. Per Game
Week 1	5,712	2	2,856
Week 2	4,200	2	2,100
Week 3	4,000	2	2,000
Week 4	2,700	2	1,350
Week 5	4,000	2	2,000
Week 6	3,846	2	1,923
Week 7	2,700	2	1,350
Week 8	1,500	1	1,500
Week 9	1,250	1	1,250
Week 10	3,500	2	1,750
Week 11	3,000	2	1,500
Week 12	1,450	2	725
Week 13	3,000	2	1,500
Week 14	2,450	2	1,225
Week 15	3,000	2	1,500
Week 16	5,400	2	2,700

== Regular season ==
=== Week 1 ===
17 April 2016	Sacramento Express	37–25	San Francisco Rush	Bonney Field, Sacramento
16:00 PDT	Try: Jope Motokana 24'; Garrett Brewer 30'; Penalty Try 64'; Olive Kilifi 72'; Ryan Koewler 80'; Con: Mirco Bergamasco 64', 73', 80' (3/5); Pen: Mirco Bergamasco 3' (1/1); Drop: Harry Bennett 79' (1/1)	Report	Try: Alec Gletzer 8'; Volney Rouse 36'; Siupeli Sakalia 42'; Con: Volney Rouse 9', 37' (2/2); Devereaux Ferris (0/1); Pen: Volney Rouse 14' (1/1); Martini Talapusi 69' (1/1); Devereaux Ferris (0/1); Cards: Nick Grass (yellow card) 60' to 70'; Tom Coolican (yellow card) 63' to 73'	Attendance: 3,400; Referee: Nick Ricono

17 April 2016	Denver Stampede	16–13	Ohio Aviators	Infinity Park, Denver
14:00 MDT	Try: Michael Al-Jiboori 71'; Nicholas Wallace 76'; Con: Niku Kruger (0/2); Pen: Niku Kruger 34' (1/2); Will Magie 80' (1/1)	Report	Try: Roland Suniula 15'; Con: Shaun Davies 16' (1/1); Pen: Shaun Davies 26', 39' (2/4); Cards: Shaun Davies (yellow card) 70' to 80'	Attendance: 2,312; Referee: Derek Summers

Bye/s: San Diego Breakers

=== Week 2 ===
23 April 2016	San Diego Breakers	37–24	Sacramento Express	Torero Stadium, San Diego
15:00 PDT	Try: Mike Te'o 20', 70'; Phil Mackenzie 26'; Cecil Garber 49'; Con: Kurt Morath 27' (1/4); Pen: Kurt Morath 3', 10', 16', 30', 75' (5/5)	Report	Try: Penalty Try 45'; Ray Barkwill 55'; Robert Meeson 79'; Con: Harry Bennett 46', 56' (2/2); Mirco Bergamasco 79' (1/1); Pen: Harry Bennett 8' (1/1)	Attendance: 2,500; Referee: Scott Green

24 April 2016	San Francisco Rush	18–35	Denver Stampede	Boxer Stadium, San Francisco
15:00 PDT	Try: Sam Finau 23'; Jack O'Hara 25'; Maka Tameilau 82'; Con: Volney Rouse (0/3); Pen: Volney Rouse 5' (1/1); Cards: Sam Finau (yellow card) 77'	Report	Try: Pedrie Wannenburg 29'; Logan Collins 39', 58'; Ata Malifa 42'; Zach Fenoglio 54'; Con: Will Magie 39', 59' (2/5); Pen: Will Magie 14', 34' (2/3)	Attendance: 1,700; Referee: Leah Berard

Bye/s: Ohio Aviators

=== Week 3 ===
1 May 2016	Ohio Aviators	51–17	San Francisco Rush	Memorial Park, Obetz
15:00 EDT	Try: Spike Davis 4', 67'; Pierce Dargan 11'; Sebastián Kalm 19', 36'; Filippo Ferrarini 45'; JP Eloff 77', 80'; Con: Shaun Davies 5', 12' (2/5); JP Eloff 78', 80' (2/3); Pen: Shaun Davies 28' (1/1); Cards: Robbie Shaw (yellow card) 41' to 51'; Kyle Baillie (yellow card) 53' to 63'	Report	Try: Jacob Finau 42'; Orene Ai'i 75'; Con: Volney Rouse 43', 76' (2/2); Pen: Volney Rouse 26' (1/1); Cards: Jacob Finau (yellow card) 41' to 51'	Attendance: 2,000; Referee: Derek Summers

1 May 2016	San Diego Breakers	16–22	Denver Stampede	Torero Stadium, San Diego
17:00 PDT	Try: Phil Mackenzie 75'; Con: Kalei Konrad 76' (1/1); Pen: Kurt Morath 10', 24', 52' (3/4)	Report	Try: Zach Fenoglio 16'; Pedrie Wannenburg 44'; Chad London 62'; Con: Will Magie 18', 64' (2/3); Pen: Will Magie 31' (1/2); Cards: Christian Wiessing (yellow card) 63' to 73'	Attendance: 2,000; Referee: Nick Ricono

Bye/s: Sacramento Express

=== Week 4 ===
8 May 2016	Sacramento Express	11–31	Ohio Aviators	Bonney Field, Sacramento
17:00 PDT	Try: Chris Saint 38'; Con: Mirco Bergamasco (0/1); Pen: Mirco Bergamasco 5', 10' (2/2); Cards: Langilangi Haupeakui (yellow card) 31' to 41'; John Quill (yellow card) 49' to 59'	Report	Try: Mason Baum 12', 76'; Spike Davis 34'; Filippo Ferrarini 52'; Sebastián Kalm 67'; Con: Shaun Davies 13' (1/2); JP Eloff 53', 77' (2/3); Pen: Shaun Davies (0/2); JP Eloff (0/1); Cards: Jamie Mackintosh (yellow card) 36' to 46'	Attendance: 2,000; Referee: Scott Green

8 May 2016	San Francisco Rush	33–46	San Diego Breakers	Boxer Stadium, San Francisco
15:00 PDT	Try: Michael Reid 13'; David Tameilau 33', 57'; Volney Rouse 53'; Viliame Iongi 68'; Con: Volney Rouse 14', 34', 54', 58' (4/5)	Report	Try: Tom Bliss 8'; Mike Te'o 36'; Cecil Garber 46'; Nikola Bursic 65'; Hubert Buydens 72'; Con: Kurt Morath 9', 37', 73' (3/5); Pen: Kurt Morath 3', 18', 22', 61', 79' (5/5)	Attendance: 700; Referee: Kurt Weaver

Bye/s: Denver Stampede

=== Week 5 ===
15 May 2016	San Diego Breakers	24–20	Ohio Aviators	Torero Stadium, San Diego
17:00 PDT	Try: Sione Tuihalamaka 17'; Phil Mackenzie 62'; Charlie Purdon 80'; Con: Kurt Morath 17', 64', 80' (3/3); Pen: Kurt Morath 10' (1/1); Cards: Charlie Purdon (yellow card) 44' to 54'	Report	Try: Jamie Mackintosh 12'; Sebastián Kalm 69'; Con: JP Eloff 13' (1/1); Robbie Shaw 70' (1/1); Pen: Robbie Shaw 40', 55' (2/3); Alex Elkins (0/1)	Attendance: 2,000; Referee: Kurt Weaver

15 May 2016	Sacramento Express	13–35	Denver Stampede	Bonney Field, Sacramento
15:00 PDT	Try: Olive Kilifi 17'; Con: Mirco Bergamasco 18' (1/1); Pen: Mirco Bergamasco 26', 31' (2/2); Cards: Mirco Bergamasco (yellow card) 43' to 53'	Report	Try: Maximo de Achaval 9', 48'; Hanco Germishuys 14', 63'; Niku Kruger 75'; Con: Will Magie 15', 76' (2/5); Pen: Will Magie 28', 33' (2/2); Cards: Chad London (yellow card) 52' to 62'	Attendance: 2,000; Referee: Leah Berard

Bye/s: San Francisco Rush

=== Week 6 ===
20 May 2016	Denver Stampede	41–37	San Francisco Rush	Infinity Park, Denver
19:00 MDT	Try: Zach Fenoglio 5'; Luke White 33'; Chad London 39', 59'; Casey Rock 44'; Christian Wiessing 53'; Con: Will Magie 6', 34', 40', 45' (4/6); Pen: Will Magie 21' (1/2); Cards: Pedrie Wannenburg (yellow card) 17' to 27'; Timana Tahu (yellow card) 47' to 57'	Report	Try: Orene Ai'i 19'; Viliame Iongi 27'; Maka Tameilau 47'; Jacob Finau 63'; Con: Volney Rouse 20', 28', 48', 64' (4/4); Pen: Volney Rouse 3', 36', 57' (3/3); Cards: Orene Ai'i (yellow card) 52' to 62'; Bill Fukofuka (yellow card) 55' to 65'	Attendance: 2,346; Referee: Nick Ricono

22 May 2016	Ohio Aviators	50–17	Sacramento Express	Memorial Park, Obetz
15:00 EDT	Try: Matt Hughston 10', 52'; Filippo Ferrarini 13'; Dylan Fawsitt 18'; Sebastián Kalm 28'; Jamie Mackintosh 40'; Spike Davis 53', 77'; Con: Shaun Davies 11', 14', 19', 41', 52' (5/8)	Report	Try: Nemia Qoro 47'; Kyle Sumsion 68'; Con: Mirco Bergamasco 48', 68' (2/2); Pen: Mirco Bergamasco 2' (1/2); Cards: Jope Motokana (yellow card) 76'	Attendance: 1,500; Referee: Kurt Weaver

Bye/s: San Diego Breakers

=== Week 7 ===
28 May 2016	San Diego Breakers	44–23	Sacramento Express	Torero Stadium, San Diego
18:30 PDT	Try: Tim Stanfill 15', 80'; Charlie Purdon 30'; Takudzwa Ngwenya 59'; Andrew Suniula 63'; Con: Kalei Konrad 16', 31' (2/2); Kurt Morath 60', 64', 80' (3/3); Pen: Kalei Konrad 13' (1/4); Kurt Morath 56', 76' (2/2)	Report	Try: John Quill 35'; Olive Kilifi 67'; Con: Mirco Bergamasco 36', 68' (2/2); Pen: Mirco Bergamasco 8', 29', 40' (3/4); Cards: John Quill (red card) 43'	Attendance: 2,000; Referee: Leah Berard

29 May 2016	San Francisco Rush	35–20	Ohio Aviators	Boxer Stadium, San Francisco
15:00 PDT	Try: Mils Muliaina 15'; David Tameilau 33'; Jacob Finau 37'; Viliame Iongi 67'; Con: Volney Rouse 16', 34', 38' (3/4); Pen: Volney Rouse 44', 51', 60' (3/3)	Report	Try: Sebastián Kalm 12'; Filippo Ferrarini 45'; Dylan Fawsitt 71'; Con: Robbie Shaw 46' (1/2); Shaun Davies (0/1); Pen: Shaun Davies 29' (1/1); Cards: Shaun Davies (yellow card) 36' to 46'	Attendance: 700; Referee: Scott Green

Bye/s: Denver Stampede

=== Week 8 ===
5 June 2016	San Diego Breakers	23–24	Denver Stampede	Torero Stadium, San Diego
17:00 PDT	Try: Kalei Konrad 61'; Con: Kurt Morath (0/1); Pen: Kurt Morath 6', 35', 40', 47', 50', 59' (6/8)	Report	Try: Maximo de Achaval 37'; Christian Wiessing 51'; Martin Knoetze 73'; Con: Will Magie 37', 52', 75' (3/3); Pen: Will Magie 44' (1/3); Cards: Ata Malifa (yellow card) 40' to 50'	Attendance: 1,500; Referee: Derek Summers

Bye/s: Ohio Aviators, Sacramento Express, San Francisco Rush

=== Week 9 ===
12 June 2016	Ohio Aviators	55–29	San Diego Breakers	Memorial Park, Obetz
15:00 EDT	Try: Dominic Waldouck 4', 42', 66'; Alex Elkins 22', 33'; Spike Davis 41', 76'; Taylor Howden 64'; Con: Robbie Shaw 5', 23', 43' (3/5); Shaun Davies 64', 67', 77' (3/3); Pen: Robbie Shaw (1/2) 12'; Drop: Taylor Howden (0/1); Cards: Jamie Mackintosh (yellow card) 24' to 34'	Report	Try: Kalei Konrad 26'; Ben Leatigaga 36', 78'; Zachary Pangelinan 81'; Con: Kurt Morath 27', 37', 79' (3/4); Pen: Kurt Morath 20' (1/2)	Attendance: 1,250; Referee: Kurt Weaver

Bye/s: Denver Stampede, Sacramento Express, San Francisco Rush

=== Week 10 ===
18 June 2016	San Diego Breakers	19–24	San Francisco Rush	Torero Stadium, San Diego
18:30 PDT	Try: Ben Leatigaga 51'; Pono Haitsuka 77'; Con: Kurt Morath (0/2); Pen: Kurt Morath 15', 28', 34' (3/3); Cards: Sione Tuihalamaka (yellow card) 6' to 16'	Report	Try: Jeremy Lenaerts 9'; Michael Haley 21'; David Tameilau 69'; Con: Volney Rouse 10', 22', 70' (3/3); Pen: Volney Rouse 31' (1/2)	Attendance: 1,500; Referee: Nick Ricono

19 June 2016	Denver Stampede	27–48	Ohio Aviators	CIBER Field, Denver
15:00 MDT	Try: Martin Knoetze 48'; Zach Fenoglio 68'; Pedrie Wannenburg 83'; Con: Will Magie 49', 69', 84' (3/3); Pen: Will Magie 29', 33' (2/2)	Report	Try: Filippo Ferrarini 19'; Spike Davis 26'; Jamie Mackintosh 43'; Alex Elkins 51'; Dominic Waldouck 55'; Ahmad Harajly 58'; Con: Shaun Davies 20', 27', 35', 53', 56', 59' (6/6); Pen: Shaun Davies 11', 40' (2/3); Cards: Jamie Mackintosh (yellow card) 65' to 75'	Attendance: 2,000; Referee: Leah Berard

Bye/s: Sacramento Express

=== Week 11 ===
26 June 2016	Ohio Aviators	71–20	San Francisco Rush	Memorial Park, Obetz
15:00 EDT	Try: Spike Davis 4', 44'; Alex Elkins 7'; Pierce Dargan 20'; Sebastian Kalm 30', 48'; Filippo Ferrarini 53'; Peter Malcolm 59'; Dylan Fawsitt 65'; Ahmad Harajly 66'; Dominic Waldouck 74'; Con: Shaun Davies 8', 31', 45', 50' (4/6); Robbie Shaw 54', 61', 67', 75' (4/5)	Report	Try: Penalty Try 70'; Jack O'Hara 80'; Con: Volney Rouse 71', 81' (2/2); Pen: Volney Rouse 2', 10' (2/3)	Attendance: 1,250; Referee: Derek Summers

26 June 2016	Denver Stampede	29–13	Sacramento Express	CIBER Field, Denver
15:00 MDT	Try: Lynton Mare 28'; Pedrie Wannenburg 45', 81'; Con: Will Magie 83' (1/3); Pen: Will Magie 18', 56', 71', 76' (4/6); Cards: Jake Turnbull (yellow card) 39' to 49'	Report	Try: Kyle Sumsion 41'; Con: Mirco Bergamasco 42' (1/1); Pen: Mirco Bergamasco 24', 59' (2/3)	Attendance: 1,750; Referee: Scott Green

Bye/s: San Diego Breakers

=== Week 12 ===
3 July 2016	Ohio Aviators	44–21	San Diego Breakers	Memorial Park, Obetz
15:00 EDT	Try: Dylan Fawsitt 20', 28'; Riekert Hattingh 49'; Spike Davis 61', 64'; Sebastián Kalm 67'; Con: Shaun Davies 21', 29' (2/3); Robbie Shaw 62', 65' (2/3); Pen: Shaun Davies 6', 27' (2/2); Cards: Ryan McTiernan (yellow card) 14' to 24'	Report	Try: Tom Bliss 73'; Jeffery Kalemani 81'; Con: Kalei Konrad 74' (1/2); Pen: Kurt Morath 13', 24', 52' (3/5); Cards: Ian Carpenter (yellow card) 45' to 55'	Attendance: 750; Referee: Kurt Weaver

3 July 2016	San Francisco Rush	19–43	Sacramento Express	Boxer Stadium, San Francisco
15:00 PDT	Try: David Tameilau 32'; Orene Ai'i 34'; Bill Fukofuka 40'; Con: Volney Rouse 33', 41' (2/3)	Report	Try: Cameron Falcon 6'; Cody Jerabek 11'; Langilangi Haupeakui 20', 44'; Kyle Sumsion 25'; Penalty Try 70'; Con: Mirco Bergamasco 7', 21', 26', 45', 71' (5/6); Pen: Mirco Bergamasco 57' (1/2)	Attendance: 700; Referee: Derek Summers

Bye/s: Denver Stampede

=== Week 13 ===
9 July 2016	Sacramento Express	31–41	Ohio Aviators	Bonney Field, Sacramento
19:30 PDT	Try: Langilangi Haupeakui 18'; Shane Moore 66'; Lagakali Tavake 69'; Tokemoana Kefu 74'; Con: Mirco Bergamasco 19', 68', 70', 74' (4/4); Pen: Mirco Bergamasco 39' (1/2); Cards: Langilangi Haupeakui (yellow card) 55' to 65'	Report	Try: Jamie Mackintosh 13'; Riekert Hattingh 30', 51'; Spike Davis 36', 61'; Alex Elkins 45'; Kyle Baillie 53'; Con: Shaun Davies 14', 31' (2/6); Robbie Shaw 62' (1/1); Cards: Angus Maclellan (yellow card) 79' to 80'	Attendance: 1,500; Referee: Nick Ricono

10 July 2016	Denver Stampede	59–23	San Diego Breakers	CIBER Field, Denver
15:00 MDT	Try: Maximo de Achaval 7'; Peter Dahl 13'; Hanco Germishuys 25', 55'; Zach Fenoglio 43', 60'; Mike Garrity 43', 64'; Timana Tahu 74'; Con: Will Magie 14', 25', 44', 56', 61', 66' (6/8); Ata Malifa 76' (1/1)	Report	Try: Joseph Taufete'e 33'; Zachary Pangelinan 52'; Ryan Matyas 78'; Con: Kalei Konrad 53' (1/2); Zachary Pangelinan (0/1); Pen: Kalei Konrad 16', 19' (2/2); Cards: Andrew Suniula (yellow card) 41' to 51'	Attendance: 1,500; Referee: Scott Green

Bye/s: San Francisco Rush

=== Week 14 ===
16 July 2016	San Francisco Rush	50–26	San Diego Breakers	Boxer Stadium, San Francisco
15:00 PDT	Try: Orene Ai'i 5', 71'; Devereaux Ferris 13', 61'; Volney Rouse 18'; Michael Haley 42'; Nick Blevins 49'; Con: Volney Rouse 6', 14', 19', 43', 62', 72' (6/7); Pen: Volney Rouse 10' (1/1)	Report	Try: Tai Tuisamoa 16'; Cecil Garber 30'; Mike Te'o 55'; Derrick Broussard 68'; Con: Kalei Konrad 17', 32', 69' (3/4); Pen: Kalei Konrad (0/1)	Attendance: 700; Referee: Scott Green

17 July 2016	Denver Stampede	59–13	Sacramento Express	CIBER Field, Denver
15:00 MDT	Try: Chad London 6'; Timana Tahu 12', 48'; Zach Fenoglio 18'; Maximo de Achaval 23'; Ata Malifa 40'; Dustin Croy 68'; Hanco Germishuys 74'; Mike Garrity 79'; Con: Will Magie 7', 19', 24', 40', 69', 75', 81' (7/9); Cards: Logan Collins (yellow card) 63' to 73'	Report	Try: Alex Hodgkinson 77'; Con: Mirco Bergamasco 78' (1/1); Pen: Mirco Bergamasco 4', 16' (2/3); Cards: Cameron Falcon (yellow card) 46' to 56'	Attendance: 1,750; Referee: Kurt Weaver

Bye/s: Ohio Aviators

=== Week 15 ===
23 July 2016	Sacramento Express	35–27	San Diego Breakers	Bonney Field, Sacramento
19:30 PDT	Try: Valdemar Lee-Lo 24'; John Quill 28'; Garrett Brewer 71'; Kyle Sumsion 79'; Con: Mirco Bergamasco 29', 72', 79' (3/4); Pen: Mirco Bergamasco 5', 46', 54' (3/4)	Report	Try: Mike Te'o 49', 56'; Takudzwa Ngwenya 60'; Ryan Matyas 67'; Con: Kurt Morath 57', 62' (2/4); Pen: Kurt Morath 78' (1/2)	Attendance: 2,000; Referee: Nick Ricono

24 July 2016	San Francisco Rush	24–31	Denver Stampede	Boxer Stadium, San Francisco
15:00 PDT	Try: Viliami Iongi 2', 14'; Bill Fukofuka 30'; Volney Rouse 43'; Con: Volney Rouse 3', 44' (2/4); Drop: Orene Ai'i (0/1)	Report	Try: Timana Tahu 10'; Pedrie Wannenburg 21'; Martin Knoetze 50'; Mose Timoteo 65'; Chad London 73'; Con: Will Magie 22', 65', 74' (3/5)	Attendance: 1,000; Referee: Leah Berard

Bye/s: Ohio Aviators

=== Week 16 ===
30 July 2016	Sacramento Express	34–37	San Francisco Rush	Bonney Field, Sacramento
19:30 PDT	Try: Chris Saint 18'; Penalty Try 55'; John Quill 71'; Estaphan Tuimasanga 83'; Con: Mirco Bergamasco 18', 55', 72', 84' (4/4); Pen: Mirco Bergamasco 23', 30' (2/2); Cards: John Quill (yellow card) 30' to 40'	Report	Try: Patrick Latu 11'; Sam Finau 25'; Devereaux Ferris 40', 44'; Mils Muliaina 43'; Con: Volney Rouse 12', 41', 45' (3/4); Devereaux Ferris (0/1); Pen: Volney Rouse 3', 79' (2/3); Cards: Volney Rouse (yellow card) 12' to 22'	Attendance: 2,000; Referee: Leah Berard

31 July 2016	Ohio Aviators	32–25	Denver Stampede	Memorial Park, Obetz
15:00 EDT	Try: Jamie Mackintosh 13'; Penalty Try 50'; Dylan Fawsitt 76'; Riekert Hattingh 83'; Con: Shaun Davies 51' (1/2); Robbie Shaw 77', 84' (2/2); Pen: Shaun Davies 26', 43' (2/2); Cards: Ryan McTiernan (yellow card) 19' to 29'; Jamie Mackintosh (yellow card) 61' to 71'; Taylor Howden (yellow card) 68' to 78'	Report	Try: Chad London 21'; Dustin Croy 56'; Zach Fenoglio 64'; Hanco Germishuys 67'; Con: Will Magie 65' (1/4); Pen: Will Magie 45' (1/1); Cards: Timana Tahu (yellow card) 24' to 34'	Attendance: 3,400; Referee: Nick Ricono

Bye/s: San Diego Breakers

== Season transfers ==
=== Denver Stampede ===
P	Nat.	Name	In (substituted in) Out (substituted off)	Ref.
HK	(United States)	Zach Fenoglio	(substituted in) Glendale Raptors	
HK	(United States)	Nicholas Wallace	(substituted in) Glendale Raptors	
PR	(United States)	Chris Baumann	(substituted in) Austin Blacks	
PR	(Tonga)	Soane Leger	(substituted in) Denver Barbarians	
PR	(United States)	Ben Tarr	(substituted in) Souths	
PR	(Australia)	Jake Turnbull	(substituted in) Eastern Suburbs	
PR	(Australia)	Luke White	(substituted in) Glendale Raptors	
LK	(United States)	Ben Landry	(substituted in) Seattle Saracens	
LK	(United States)	Brodie Orth	(substituted in) Kansas City Blues	
LK	(United States)	Casey Rock	(substituted in) Glendale Raptors	
LK	(United States)	Christian Wiessing	(substituted in) Glendale Raptors	
FL	(United States)	Logan Collins	(substituted in) Denver Barbarians	
FL	(United States)	Peter Dahl	(substituted in) Belmont Shore	
FL	(United States)	Hanco Germishuys	(substituted in) Glendale Raptors	
FL	(United States)	Gannon Moore	(substituted in) Kansas City Blues	
N8	(United States)	Zac Pauga	(substituted in) Glendale Raptors	
N8	(South Africa)	Pedrie Wannenburg	(substituted in) Oyonnax	
SH	(United States)	Bobby Impson	(substituted in) Denver Barbarians	
SH	(United States)	Niku Kruger	(substituted in) Glendale Raptors	
SH	(United States)	Mose Timoteo	(substituted in) San Francisco Golden Gate	
FH	(United States)	Will Magie	(substituted in) Barnes	
FH	(United States)	Ata Malifa	(substituted in) Denver Barbarians	
FH	(South Africa)	Armandt Peens	(substituted in) Glendale Raptors	
CE	(United States)	Michael Garrity	(substituted in) Seattle Saracens	
CE	(United States)	Chad London	(substituted in) Glendale Raptors	
CE	(United States)	Justin Pauga	(substituted in) Denver Barbarians	
CE	(United States)	Brian Wanless	(substituted in) Glendale Raptors	
WG	(United States)	Michael Al-Jiboori	(substituted in) Denver Barbarians	
WG	(South Africa)	Martin Knoetze	(substituted in) Glendale Raptors	
WG	(Australia)	Timana Tahu	(substituted in) Newcastle Knights	
FB	(United States)	Dustin Croy	(substituted in) Glendale Raptors	
FB	(Argentina)	Maximo de Achaval	(substituted in) Denver Barbarians	

=== Ohio Aviators ===
P	Nat.	Name	In (substituted in) Out (substituted off)	Ref.
HK	(United States)	Cam Falcon	(substituted off) Sacramento Express	
HK	(Ireland)	Dylan Fawsitt	(substituted in) Life University	
HK	(United States)	Peter Malcolm	(substituted in) Wheeling Jesuit University	
HK	(United States)	Chris Schade	(substituted in) Columbus	
PR	(United States)	Demecus Beach	(substituted in) Life University	
PR	(New Zealand)	Jamie Mackintosh	(substituted in) Montpellier	
PR	(United States)	Angus MacLellan	(substituted in) Chicago Lions	
PR	(United States)	Anthony Parry	(substituted in) Columbus	
PR	(United States)	Derrek Van Klein	(substituted in) James Bay	
LK	(Canada)	Kyle Baillie	(substituted in) Atlantic Rock	
LK	(United States)	Pierce Dargan	(substituted in) Clontarf	
LK	(United States)	Ryan McTiernan	(substituted in) New York Athletic Club	
FL	(Italy)	Filippo Ferrarini	(substituted in) Zebre	
FL	(United States)	Matt Hughston	(substituted in) Charlotte	
FL	(New Zealand)	Chad Joseph	(substituted in) Dallas	
N8	(Chile)	Sebastián Kalm	(substituted in) Lindenwood	
N8	(United States)	Dominic Pezzutti	(substituted in) Columbus	
SH	(United States)	Ryan Cochran	(substituted in) Columbus	
SH	(United States)	Shaun Davies	(substituted in) Life University	
SH	(United States)	Robbie Shaw	(substituted in) Hartpury College	
FH	(United States)	JP Eloff	(substituted in) Chicago Lions	
FH	(United States)	Taylor Howden	(substituted in) Columbus	
FH	(United States)	Chris Kunkel	(substituted in) Richmond	
CE	(United States)	Allan Hanson	(substituted in) Wheeling Jesuit University	
CE	(United States)	Zach Stryffeler	(substituted in) Columbus	
CE	(United States)	Roland Suniula	(substituted in) Chalon	
CE	(England)	Dominic Waldouck	(substituted in) London Irish	
WG	(United States)	Mason Baum	(substituted in) Davenport University	
WG	(United States)	Spike Davis	(substituted in) Columbus	
WG	(United States)	Alex Elkins	(substituted in) Columbus	
WG	(United States)	Shawn Riley	(substituted in) Notre Dame College	
FB	(United States)	Ahmad Harajly	(substituted in) Detroit Tradesmen	
FB	(United States)	Sam McGuffie	(substituted in) Winnipeg Blue Bombers	
FB	(United States)	Zac Mizell	(substituted in) Austin Blacks	

=== Sacramento Express ===
P	Nat.	Name	In (substituted in) Out (substituted off)	Ref.
HK	(Canada)	Ray Barkwill	(substituted in) Ontario Blues	
HK	(United States)	Cam Falcon	(substituted in) Ohio Aviators	
HK	(Philippines)	Josh Inong	(substituted in) Santa Rosa	
HK	(Tonga)	Lagakali Tavake	(substituted in) Sacramento Blackhawks	
PR	(United States)	Toke Kefu	(substituted in) Sacramento Blackhawks	
PR	(United States)	Olive Kilifi	(substituted in) Seattle Saracens	
PR	(United States)	Valdemar Lee-Lo	(substituted in) Seattle Saracens	
PR	(England)	James Reddey	(substituted in) Sacramento Blackhawks	
PR	(United States)	Estephan Tuamasaga	(substituted in) Sacramento Blackhawks	
LK	(United States)	Matt Doubek	(substituted in) Classic Eagles	
LK	(United States)	Rich Knight	(substituted off) San Francisco Rush	
LK	(United States)	Robert Meeson	(substituted in) Santa Rosa	
LK	(United States)	Sione Sina	(substituted in) Cal	
FL	(United States)	Ryan Koewler	(substituted in) Sacramento Capitals	
FL	(United States)	John Quill	(substituted in) Dolphin	
FL	(United States)	Kyle Sumsion	(substituted in) BYU	
N8	(United States)	Langilangi Haupeakui	(substituted in) East Palo Alto Razorbacks	
N8	(Tonga)	Sione Latu	(substituted in) Sacramento Blackhawks	
SH	(Samoa)	Ronald Dwyer	(substituted in) East Palo Alto Razorbacks	
SH	(United States)	Jope Motokana	(substituted in) Seattle Saracens	
SH	(United States)	Chris Saint	(substituted in) Potomac Exiles	
FH	(Australia)	Harry Bennett	(substituted in) Metropolis	
FH	(United States)	Garrett Brewer	(substituted in) St. Mary's	
CE	(Italy)	Mirco Bergamasco	(substituted in) Zebre	
CE	(United States)	Cody Jerabek	(substituted in) University of Wyoming	
CE	(United States)	Nemia Qoro	(substituted in) Life West	
CE	(United States)	Alipate Takiveikata	(substituted in) Metropolis	
WG	(United States)	Rashad Harbor	(substituted in) Dallas Reds	
WG	(United States)	Shane Moore	(substituted in) Seattle Saracens	
WG	(United States)	Joeli Tikoisuva	(substituted in) Metropolis	
WG	(United States)	Fatai Vailala	(substituted in) East Palo Alto Razorbacks	
FB	(United States)	Joshua Holland	(substituted in) San Francisco Golden Gate	
FB	(United States)	Ryan Thompson	(substituted in) Tempe	

=== San Diego Breakers ===
P	Nat.	Name	In (substituted in) Out (substituted off)	Ref.
HK	(United States)	Tim Barford	(substituted in) Old Mission Beach	
HK	(United States)	Mike Sosene-Feagai	(substituted in) Hawke's Bay	
HK	(United States)	Joe Taufete'e	(substituted in) Belmont Shore	
PR	(Canada)	Hubert Buydens	(substituted in) Castaway Wanderers	
PR	(Canada)	Jake Ilnicki	(substituted in) Castaway Wanderers	
PR	(United States)	Jeffrey Kalemani	(substituted in) Santa Monica	
PR	(United States)	Mason Pedersen	(substituted in) University of Arizona	
PR	(United States)	Kakalia Pule	(substituted in) Tempe	
PR	(United States)	Sam Taungākava	(substituted in) Seattle Saracens	
PR	(United States)	Brice Schilling	(substituted in) Belmont Shore	
LK	(United States)	Ian Carpenter	(substituted in) Belmont Shore	
LK	(United States)	David Dolinar	(substituted in) Naval Academy	
LK	(United States)	Brian Doyle	(substituted in) Old Mission Beach	
LK	(United States)	Tai Tuisamoa	(substituted in) Old Mission Beach	
FL	(Chile)	Nikola Bursic	(substituted in) Craighouse Old Boys	
FL	(United States)	Cecil Garber	(substituted in) Seattle Saracens	
FL	(France)	Jean-Baptiste Gobelet	(substituted in) Old Mission Beach	
FL	(United States)	Bruce Thomas	(substituted in) San Francisco Golden Gate	
FL	(United States)	Chris Turori	(substituted in) Old Mission Beach	
N8	(Samoa)	Arnold Meredith	(substituted in) Belmont Shore	
N8	(United States)	Sione Tuihalamaka	(substituted in) Seattle Saracens	
N8	(United States)	Jabari Zuberi	(substituted in) Seattle Saracens	
SH	(United States)	Tom Bliss	(substituted in) Wasps	
SH	(South Africa)	Charlie Purdon	(substituted in) Santa Monica	
FH	(United States)	Kalei Konrad	(substituted in) Old Mission Beach	
FH	(Tonga)	Kurt Morath	(substituted in) Biarritz	
CE	(United States)	Ben Leatigaga	(substituted in) All-Army	
CE	(Canada)	Phil Mackenzie	(substituted in) Sale	
CE	(United States)	Ryan Matyas	(substituted in) Old Blue	
CE	(United States)	Andrew Suniula	(substituted in) București	
WG	(United States)	Ryne Haitsuka	(substituted in) Mystic River	
WG	(United States)	Takudzwa Ngwenya	(substituted in) Biarritz	
WG	(England)	Sebastian Sharpe	(substituted in) UCLA Bruins	
WG	(United States)	Tim Stanfill	(substituted in) Seattle Saracens	
FB	(United States)	Mike Te'o	(substituted in) Belmont Shore	

=== San Francisco Rush ===
P	Nat.	Name	In (substituted in) Out (substituted off)	Ref.
HK	(United States)	Tom Coolican	(substituted in) Sydney Stars	
HK	(United States)	Jacob Finau	(substituted in) Life West	
HK	(United States)	Codi Jones	(substituted in) California Maritime	
PR	(United States)	Patrick Latu	(substituted in) San Francisco Golden Gate	
PR	(United States)	Dominic Lolohea	(substituted in) Life West	
PR	(American Samoa)	Fancy Namulau'ulu	(substituted in) Life West	
PR	(United States)	Maka Tameilau	(substituted in) Life West	
LK	(United States)	Alex Bowman	(substituted in) Olympic Club	
LK	(United States)	John Colvill	(substituted in) Life West	
LK	(United States)	Brendan Daly	(substituted in) San Francisco Golden Gate	
LK	(United States)	Nick Grass	(substituted in) Cal	
LK	(United States)	Rich Knight	(substituted in) Sacramento Express	
LK	(United States)	Siaosi Mahoni	(substituted in) East Palo Alto Bulldogs	
FL	(United States)	Alec Gletzer	(substituted in) Cal	
FL	(Tonga)	Isaac Helu	(substituted in) Olympic Club	
FL	(United States)	Siupeli Sakalia	(substituted in) East Palo Alto Bulldogs	
FL	(Fiji)	Naibuka Tawake	(substituted in) Life West	
N8	(Tonga)	Sam Finau	(substituted in) Auckland University	
N8	(Tonga)	Bill Fukofuka	(substituted in) Southland	
N8	(United States)	David Tameilau	(substituted in) Life West	
SH	(New Zealand)	Devereaux Ferris	(substituted in) Life West	
SH	(United States)	Junior Helu	(substituted in) Life West	
SH	(United States)	Michael Reid	(substituted in) Spotswood United	
FH	(New Zealand)	Orene Ai'i	(substituted in) Life West	
FH	(United States)	Volney Rouse	(substituted in) San Francisco Golden Gate	
CE	(Canada)	Nick Blevins	(substituted in) Calgary Hornets	
CE	(Tonga)	Petuliki Mateo	(substituted in) East Palo Alto Bulldogs	
CE	(Samoa)	Martini Talapusi	(substituted in) Belfast	
WG	(United States)	Michael Haley	(substituted in) Olympic Club	
WG	(United States)	Pila Huihui	(substituted in) San Francisco Golden Gate	
WG	(Tonga)	Viliame Iongi	(substituted in) Nottingham	
WG	(United States)	Jack O'Hara	(substituted in) Santa Clara University	
FB	(United States)	Jake Anderson	(substituted in) Cal	
FB	(New Zealand)	Mils Muliaina	(substituted in) Zebre	
