= Devereaux Ferris =

American rugby union player (born 1994)

- Full name: Devereaux St Bruno Ferris
- Born: October 24, 1994 (age 32) Auckland, New Zealand
- Height: 5 ft 9 in (1.75 m)
- Weight: 180 lb (82 kg)
- School: King's College
- University: Life West

Rugby union career
- Position: Scrum-half
- Current team: Seattle Seawolves
Amateur team(s)
Years	Team	Apps	(Points)
- Mid Northern RFC
2014	San Diego Old Aztecs		
2015–2019	Life West		
- Correct as of November 19, 2018
Senior career
Years	Team	Apps	(Points)
2016	San Francisco Rush	9	(20)
2020	San Diego Legion	4	(5)
2021	Seattle Seawolves		
2022	NOLA Gold		
2023	Houston SaberCats		
2023-present	Seattle Seawolves		
- Correct as of July 16, 2023
International career
Years	Team	Apps	(Points)
2017	USA Islanders	1	(0)
2017–	USA Selects	3	(0)
2018–	United States	1	(0)
- Correct as of November 19, 2018

Devereaux St Bruno Ferris (born October 24, 1994) is a New Zealand-born, American rugby union player who plays at scrum-half for the Seattle Seawolves in Major League Rugby (MLR). He also represents America as a member of the United States men's national team and USA Selects.

Ferris has also played for the San Diego Legion, the New Orleans Gold and the Houston SaberCats in MLR, but returned to the Seattle Seawolves. He previously played for the San Francisco Rush in PRO Rugby, the USA Islanders, and Life West.

== Early life ==
Ferris was born on October 24, 1994 in Auckland, New Zealand and is of Māori descent. Ferris began playing rugby at the age of three and attended King's College. After having played rugby with Mid Northern RFC in New Zealand and with the San Diego Old Aztecs of San Diego, California for one season, Ferris moved to the United States permanently to play for Life West, where he has been coached by his father. In 2016, Ferris won a DII National Championship as a member of the Life West rugby team.

== Club career ==
=== San Francisco Rush ===
In April 2016, it was announced that Ferris had signed with the San Francisco Rush of PRO Rugby for that competition's first and only season. Ferris made his debut for the Rush on April 17, appearing as a substitute, in a 37–25 loss to Sacramento. Ferris made his first start for the Rush at scrum-half on April 24, in a 35–18 defeat to Denver. Ferris scored two tries in one match on two occasions during the season: on July 16 against the San Diego Breakers and on July 30 against the Sacramento Express.

=== San Diego Legion ===
Ferris was listed on the roster for the San Diego Legion for their inaugural season in Major League Rugby, but he did not make an appearance for the club.

=== Seattle Seawolves ===
Ferris signed with Seattle for the 2021 MLR season.

=== NOLA Gold ===
Ferris signed with NOLA Gold for the 2022 MLR season.

=== Houston Sabercats ===
Ferris signed with the Houston Sabercats for the 2023 MLR season.

== International career ==
=== USA Islanders ===
In 2017, it was announced that Ferris had been named to the roster of the USA Islanders and would serve as vice-captain. On August 10, 2017, Ferris started for the Islanders at scrum-half in their inaugural match—a 92–0 defeat to Saracens F.C.

=== USA Selects ===
Ferris was first named to the USA Selects' roster in September 2017, as a non-travelling reserve, in advance of the 2017 Americas Pacific Challenge. In September 2018, it was announced that Ferris had been named to the Selects' roster for the 2018 Americas Pacific Challenge. Ferris made his debut for the Selects on October 6, 2018, appearing as a substitute, in a 39–30 defeat to Tonga.

=== USA Eagles ===
Ferris was first named to the roster for the USA Eagles for the 2018 Americas Rugby Championship, but he did not make an appearing during the competition. Ferris made his debut for the Eagles on November 10, 2018, appearing as a substitute, in the Eagles' 30–29 victory over Samoa during the 2018 end-of-year tests.
