= San Francisco Rush =

San Francisco Rush may refer to:

- San Francisco Rush: Extreme Racing, a 1996 video game
- San Francisco Rush (rugby union), a 2016 professional rugby union club
- San Francisco Rush, a prospective rugby league team expected to join the North American Rugby League
