= Peter Malcolm (rugby union) =

American rugby union player (b. 1994)

- Born: April 3, 1994 (age 32) Frederick, Maryland
- Height: 6 ft 1 in (1.85 m)
- Weight: 225 lb (102 kg)
- School: Stoneman Douglas High School
- University: Wheeling Jesuit University

Rugby union career
- Position: Hooker
- Current team: Seattle Seawolves
Amateur team(s)
Years	Team	Apps	(Points)
2017	Austin Huns		
- Correct as of April 26, 2018
Senior career
Years	Team	Apps	(Points)
2016	Ohio Aviators	9	(5)
2018–2019	Austin Elite	8	(0)
2020-pres.	San Diego Legion		
- Correct as of April 26, 2018
International career
Years	Team	Apps	(Points)
2016–2017	United States U20		
2017	United States U23		
2017	USA Selects	3	(5)
2017–present	United States	11	(15)
- Correct as of April 26, 2018
National sevens team
Years	Team		Comps
2015	USA Falcons		1
- Correct as of April 26, 2018

Peter Malcolm (born April 3, 1994) is an American rugby union player who plays hooker for the Seattle Seawolves in Major League Rugby (MLR) and the United States men's national team.

Malcolm previously played for the Ohio Aviators in the short-lived PRO Rugby, the San Diego Legion and the Austin Elite in the MLR. Malcolm also played for the USA Eagles-#505, USA Falcons - developmental side for the United States men's national rugby sevens team.

== Early life ==
Malcolm attended Stoneman Douglas High School in Parkland, Florida, where he played both football and rugby. He was named a USA Rugby High School All American each of his four years in high school. After graduating from Stoneman Douglas, he attended Wheeling Jesuit University where he continued to play rugby and was named a Collegiate All American. In 2017, Malcolm moved to Austin, Texas, where he played for the Austin Huns. The Huns won the 2017 National Championship, with Malcolm scoring a try in the championship final against New York Athletic Club.

== Club career ==
=== Ohio Aviators ===
Malcolm played for the Ohio Aviators in PRO Rugby's first and only season in 2016. Malcolm made his debut for the Aviators on May 1, starting in the Aviators' 51–17 victory over San Francisco. He scored his first (and only) try for the Aviators on June 26, in the Aviators' 71–20 victory over San Francisco.

=== Austin Elite ===
Malcolm joined the Austin Elite for their inaugural season in 2018. He was the first player to be signed by the Major League Rugby club. Malcolm missed the entire 2018 season after sustaining a torn ACL.

== International career ==
=== USA Falcons ===
Malcolm competed for the USA Falcons, the developmental side for the United States men's national rugby sevens team, at the Halloween 7s Elite Invitational Tournament that was held on October 31 and November 1, 2015.

=== USA Junior All-Americans ===
Malcolm made his debut in international play with the United States men's national under-20 team (Junior All-Americans) in 2014 and played at the 2014 Junior World Rugby Trophy, making a start at number eight.

=== USA Collegiate All-Americans ===
Malcolm served as captain of the Men's Collegiate All-Americans in a September 16, 2017 match against Oxford University.

=== USA Selects ===
Malcolm was selected to represent the United States in the Selects' appearance in the 2017 World Rugby Americas Pacific Challenge (APC). He was named the team's captain by Head Coach Scott Lawrence. He scored his first try for the Selects in a 48–26 defeat to Samoa. He also started in 2017 APC victories over Uruguay and Canada.

=== USA Eagles ===
Malcolm made his debut with the USA Eagles on February 4, 2017, starting in the Eagles' 29–23 victory over Uruguay in the 2017 Americas Rugby Championship. Malcolm scored his first two tries for the Eagles in the Eagles' 57–9 victory over Chile on February 25, 2017.
