= Alec Gletzer =

US international rugby union player

- Born: October 10, 1991 (age 35)
- Height: 6 ft 0 in (183 cm)
- Weight: 224 lb (102 kg)
- University: UC Berkeley

Rugby union career
- Position: Flanker
International career
Years	Team	Apps	(Points)
2016	United States	2	(0)

Alec Gletzer (born October 10, 1991) is an American former international rugby union player.

Gletzer grew up in the Bay Area. He left football to join the rugby program at Santa Barbara City College and went to play varsity rugby with UC Berkeley.

A flanker, Gletzer was a United States Under-20s representative and earned a United States senior call up for the 2016 Americas Rugby Championship, gaining caps in matches against Canada and Chile, both as a replacement forward. Gletzer was also later selected for the USA 7's team for its 2016 HSBC's 7's series in Dubai & Cape Town.

Gletzer played professional rugby for the San Francisco Rush in the 2016 PRO Rugby season.

== See also ==
- List of United States national rugby union players
