= Tevita Tameilau =

US international rugby union & league player

- Born: Tevita Tameilau; January 22, 1990 (age 36) Redwood City, California, United States
- Height: 6 ft 5 in (1.96 m)
- Weight: 270 lb (120 kg; 19 st 4 lb)

Rugby union career
- Position: Loose forward
Amateur team(s)
Years	Team	Apps	(Points)
- East Palo Alto Razorbacks
2018–2019	Currie		
Senior career
Years	Team	Apps	(Points)
2016	San Francisco	6	(30)
2016	Newcastle	0	(0)
2016–2018	Narbonne	35	(5)
2018	Utah Warriors	9	(10)
2018–2019	Glasgow Warriors	6	(5)
2019–	San Diego	47	(35)
- Correct as of 19 December 2023
International career
Years	Team	Apps	(Points)
2009	United States U20	4	(5)
2016–	United States	15	(10)
- Correct as of 28 December 2020

Tevita Tameilau (born January 22, 1990) is an American rugby player who plays as a loose forward for the San Diego Legion of Major League Rugby (MLR) and the United States national rugby union team.

He previously played for the Glasgow Warriors in the Guinness Pro14.

Tameilau is the son of Moses Similai, who played rugby internationally.

== Amateur career ==
Tameilau played for U.S. youth teams, and played in the 2007 U19 World Cup and 2008 Junior World Championship. Tameilau attended San Francisco City College, then went on a religious mission, then played American football with the NCAA Division II West Texas A&M Buffaloes.

== Professional career ==
In 2015, Tameilau decided to again focus on rugby. He played for SFGG in the Pacific Rugby Premiership, and then trained with the Taranaki Rugby Academy. In early 2016, he signed for the San Francisco Rush, North America's first professional rugby competition.

In early 2016, Tameilau was predicted to be the breakout player of the year for the U.S. Tameilau debuted for the U.S. national team in the 2016 Americas Rugby Championship.

Tameilau was drafted to Currie in the Scottish Premiership for the 2018-19 season.

In November 2019, Tameilau was released by Glasgow Warriors. Following this, he was signed by the San Diego Legion on 12 November 2019.

== Rugby league ==
In 2020 Tameilau played in the California Rugby League for the East Palo Alto Razorbacks.
