= Zachary Pangelinan =

American rugby union player

- Full name: Zachary James Pangelinan
- Born: June 16, 1988 (age 38) Hagatna, Guam
- Height: 5 ft 9 in (1.75 m)
- Weight: 185 lb (84 kg)

Rugby union career
- Position: Scrum half
Amateur team(s)
Years	Team	Apps	(Points)
2007–2017	OMBAC RFC		
Senior career
Years	Team	Apps	(Points)
2016	San Diego Breakers	5	(10)
2017–present	Houston SaberCats	56	(40)
- Correct as of June 27, 2023
International career
Years	Team	Apps	(Points)
2012	United States	2	(8)
2013	Bermuda Select XV		
2017	USA Selects	2	(5)
- Correct as of December 28, 2020
National sevens team
Years	Team		Comps
2009–	USA 7s		

Football career
Personal information
- Position: Midfielder

Senior career*
Years	Team	Apps	(Gls)
2004	Guam Under 18s		
2005–2008	Guam Shipyard		

International career^{‡}
2005–2008	Guam	6	(4)
- * Club domestic league appearances and goals ‡ National team caps and goals as of October 26, 2008

Zachary James "Zach" Pangelinan (born June 16, 1988) is an American rugby international player for the United States. He also plays for the Houston SaberCats in Major League Rugby (MLR). He previously played soccer.

Pangelinan made his debut for the U.S. national rugby team on November 17, 2012, in the International Rugby Series, starting at fullback in place of the unavailable Chris Wyles.

Pangelinan was the leading scorer for the United States in that match with eight points. He played club rugby with OMBAC.

Pangelinan was born in Hagåtña, Guam, and formerly played soccer as a midfielder for Guam.

== Football ==
=== Club career ===
Pangelinan played for Guam Shipyard Football Club, and won four Guam League titles between 2005 and 2006 with them. Previously, he was part of the Guam Under-18 team that won two league titles in 2004.

=== International career ===
==== Appearances ====
- Debut in 2005 East Asian Cup
- At least one appearance (out of four) at the 2005 East Asian Cup (scored a goal in one match)
- Three appearances at the 2008 East Asian Cup (Does not count appearances (2) and goals (7) against Northern Mariana Islands as they were not 'A' international matches)
- Three appearances at the 2008 AFC Challenge Cup

==== Goals ====
Goal	Date	Venue	Opponent	Goals scored	Result	Competition
1.	March 9, 2005	Chungshan Soccer Stadium, Taipei	Mongolia	1	1 - 4	East Asian Cup 2005 qualifying
2.	June 23, 2007	Macau Stadium, Macau	Mongolia	1	2 - 5	East Asian Cup 2008 Fifth place playoff
3.	April 4, 2008	Chungshan Soccer Stadium, Taipei	Chinese Taipei	1	1 - 4	AFC Challenge Cup 2008 qualifying
4.	April 6, 2008	Chungshan Soccer Stadium, Taipei	Pakistan	1	2 - 9	AFC Challenge Cup 2008 qualifying

== Rugby union ==
=== Club career ===
Pangelinan played his club rugby for OMBAC. On January 9, 2013 he was awarded the RugbyMag.com Player of the Week prize for his match-winning performance against Los Angeles.

=== International career ===
In addition to Pangelinan's appearances for the USA Eagles, he has represented his native Guam in rugby.

In May 2013, he was one of five USA Eagles players chosen to represent a Bermuda International Select XV side in a challenge game with English Premiership side Saracens.
