= Volney Rouse =

US international rugby union player

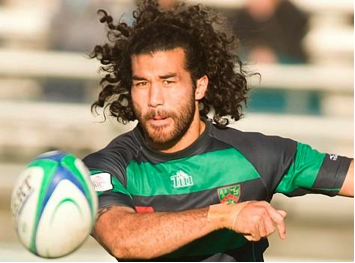
- Born: 6 December 1983 (age 42) Oakland, California, U.S.
- Height: 1.80 m (5 ft 11 in)
- Weight: 93 kg (205 lb)

Rugby union career
- Position(s): Fly-half, Centre
- Current team: San Francisco Rush
Senior career
Years	Team	Apps	(Points)
2016	San Francisco Rush	12	(131)
- Correct as of 23 October 2016
International career
Years	Team	Apps	(Points)
2010	United States	1	(3)
2015–	Philippines 7s	3	(5)
- Correct as of 23 October 2016

Volney Rouse (born December 6, 1983) is an American rugby union player. Rouse plays his club rugby for San Francisco Golden Gate Rugby Club, and also played for the San Francisco Rush in 2016.

== Domestic ==
Rouse played collegiate rugby at St. Mary's College, where he was named to the All-American team in 2006 and 2007. Since college, Rouse has played club rugby with San Francisco Golden Gate in top American club competitions including the Rugby Super League, USA Rugby Elite Cup, and Pacific Rugby Premiership. In 2013, he was part of the SFGG squad that participated in the 2013 World Club 7s.

In 2016, Rouse joined the San Francisco Rush in their inaugural season. Rouse played all twelve matches for the Rush, scoring a league-high 131 points.

In 2024, Rouse worked at St. Mary's College as a strengths coach.

== International ==
Rouse was selected once for the United States national rugby union team, coming on as a substitute against Russia in June 2010. He had also been selected to tour with the national team for the Autumn 2010 tour of Europe and with the USA Selects for the 2012 Americas Rugby Championship. Rouse later switched his national team affiliation when he suited up for the Philippine Volcanoes 7s during the 2015 ARFU Men's Sevens Championships. He has also played with the team during their 2016 Asia Rugby Development Sevens Series events.
