= Tom Coolican =

American rugby union player

Thomas Coolican
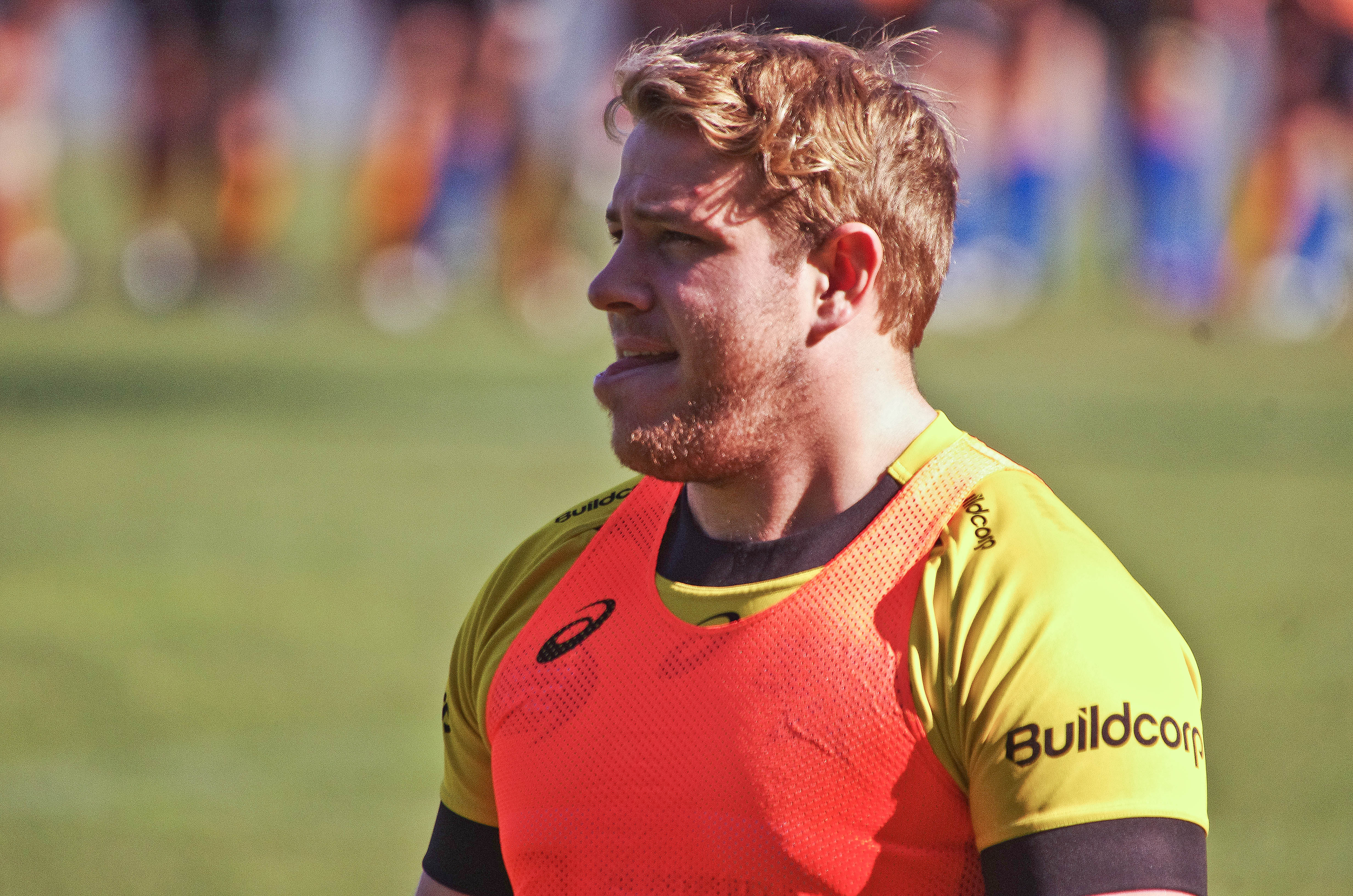
- Born: Thomas Coolican; August 26, 1988 (age 38) Cleveland, Ohio, United States
- Height: 1.85 m (6 ft 1 in)
- Weight: 105 kg (231 lb; 16 st 7 lb)

Rugby union career
- Position: Hooker / Flanker
- Current team: Sydney University
Amateur team(s)
Years	Team	Apps	(Points)
- Lindfield Rugby Club
- Saint Ignatius' College
2008–2009	Sydney University		
2010–2012	Eastern Suburbs		
2013	New York Athletic Club		
2014	Eastern Suburbs		
2014	Sydney University		
Senior career
Years	Team	Apps	(Points)
2012	Waratahs "A"	2	(0)
2013–2014	Richmond F.C.	14	(5)
2014–2015	Sydney Stars	13	(5)
2016	San Francisco Rush	3	(0)
- Correct as of 28 December 2020
International career
Years	Team	Apps	(Points)
2011	Australian Univ. XV		
2014	United States	8	(0)
- Correct as of 28 December 2020

Thomas Coolican (born 26 August 1988) is a former Australian-American rugby union player. He played professionally for the San Francisco Rush in 2016. He previously played in Australia for Sydney University in the Shute Shield and Sydney Stars in the National Rugby Championship.

== Career ==
=== Early career ===
Born in Cleveland, Ohio, Coolican grew up in Australia where he began his rugby career. At an early age he played with the Lindfield Rugby Club while being educated at Saint Ignatius' College in Riverview, New South Wales. While at Saint Ignatius, he earned his first XV honors which led to Coolican being selected for New South Wales at Schoolboy level. After completing high school, he went on to represent Sydney University first Colts team in 2008. In 2009, Coolican was part of the Sydney University team that came second to Gordon in the JR Henderson Shield Grand Final, losing 6–3. However, in 2010 he joined Eastern Suburbs, where again Coolican found himself finishing second in the JR Henderson Shield Grand Final, losing 12–3 to Randwick.

=== 2012 ===
In 2012, Tom was involved with the New South Wales Waratahs set-up for the 2012 Pacific Rugby Cup. He earned two caps for the Waratahs "A" side facing Tonga "A", winning 27–11, and Samoa "A" losing 25–5. Though Coolican did not play at Super Rugby level, he was involved for most of the season, training at the same standard as the rest of the players in the squad.

=== 2013 ===
In 2013, Coolican left Australia for the United States after he received an invitation to return to America to play with the acclaimed New York Athletic Club (NYAC). As club rugby was not fully professional in the United States, Coolican simultaneously played for the NYAC while continuing his legal education at the St. John's University School of Law in New York City, studying a Masters of Sports Law.

In late 2013, Coolican left the United States to play for Richmond in England. He played just six times for the club in his debut season, 2013–14 National League 1, helping the team to an improved position of seventh from the previous season.

=== 2014 ===
In March 2014, Coolican received a call-up to the United States national team for the two-legged Americas qualification play-offs against Uruguay. He earned his first cap in the first leg in Montevideo, coming on for Phil Thiel at the 74th minute. The match finished as a draw, 27–27. In the return fixture, Coolican again replaced Thiel at the 74th minute, to play a small part in the 32–13 win to qualify for the 2015 Rugby World Cup.

He played a prominent part in the 2014 Pacific Nations cup, culminating in making a match winning charge down vs Canada in Sacramento.

In mid 2014, Coolican returned to Australia to play for Eastern Suburbs in the senior side for the Shute Shield. In addition to this, he was also selected for the Sydney Stars team for the inaugural season of Australia's National Rugby Championship.

=== PRO Rugby ===
Coolican returned to the United States and signed for the San Francisco Rush for the 2016 season.
