= Kyle Sumsion =

American rugby union player

- Born: 29 October 1993 (age 33) American Fork, Utah
- Height: 6 ft 2 in (1.88 m)
- Weight: 240 lb (110 kg)
- University: Brigham Young University

Rugby union career
- Position: Flanker
Senior career
Years	Team	Apps	(Points)
2016	Sacramento Express	12	(20)
2018	Houston Sabercats	8	(0)
2019–	Rugby United New York	13	(15)
- Correct as of 28 December 2020
International career
Years	Team	Apps	(Points)
2014	United States	5	(0)
- Correct as of 28 December 2020

Kyle Sumsion (born 29 October 1993) is an American professional rugby union player. He plays as a flanker for Rugby United New York (RUNY) in Major League Rugby (MLR).

== Professional career ==
In 2014, Sumsion represented the United States national rugby union team. He previously played centre for the Sacramento Express in PRO Rugby in 2016 and the Houston Sabercats in Major League Rugby during the 2018 season.
