= Mike Te'o =

American rugby union player (born 1993)

- Full name: Michael Paseka Te'o
- Born: July 23, 1993 (age 33) Long Beach, California, U.S.
- Height: 5 ft 8 in (173 cm)
- Weight: 205 lb (93 kg)
- School: Long Beach Polytechnic High School

Rugby union career
- Position(s): Wing, Fullback
- Current team: San Diego Legion
Senior career
Years	Team	Apps	(Points)
2016	San Diego Breakers	10	(30)
2018–2020	San Diego Legion	15	(40)
2020	London Scottish	0	(0)
2021–2022	Utah Warriors	23	(67)
2023–	San Diego Legion	18	(30)
- Correct as of 7 August 2023
International career
Years	Team	Apps	(Points)
2012–2013	United States U20	6	(15)
2016–	United States	30	(80)
2016	USA Selects	3	(5)
- Correct as of 10 July 2021
National sevens team
Years	Team		Comps
2012–2017	United States		11
- Correct as of 21 May 2017

Michael Paseka Te'o (born July 23, 1993) is an American professional rugby player who plays for the San Diego Legion of Major League Rugby (MLR). He also represents the America as a member of the United States national rugby union team.

He previously played for London Scottish in the RFU Championship England's second tier competition.

Te'o debuted for the U.S. at the 2016 Americas Rugby Championship, playing mostly at scrum-half, but also at fullback.

== Early career ==
As a youth, Te'o grew up in Long Beach, California. He played American football for the Long Beach Polytechnic football team in addition to rugby.

Te'o was a member of the United States national under-20 rugby union team that won the 2012 IRB Junior World Rugby Trophy.

== Professional rugby career ==
Te'o has also played for the United States national rugby sevens team, debuting at the 2012 Gold Coast Sevens during the 2012-13 World Rugby Sevens Series. Te'o was later named as a non-traveling reserve for the U.S. sevens squad for the 2014 Australia Sevens. Te'o played for the U.S. sevens team in the 2015 Pan American Games.

Before signing with the San Diego Breakers in the short-lived PRO Rugby, Te'o played for Belmont Shore in Long Beach, California in both 15s and sevens. With Belmont Shore he won the 2012 15s National Championship, the Club 7's National Championship, and was named 7's tournament MVP. He has also played with the Taranaki Development program in New Zealand.

Te’o signed with London Scottish ahead of the 2020–21 season, but never played a match as the season was suspended due to the pandemic. The Utah Warriors signed USA Mike Te’o for the 2021 Major League Rugby season. Te'o was traded back to the San Diego Legion in September 2022 for the 2023 Major League Rugby season.
