= Nick Blevins =

Canada international rugby union player

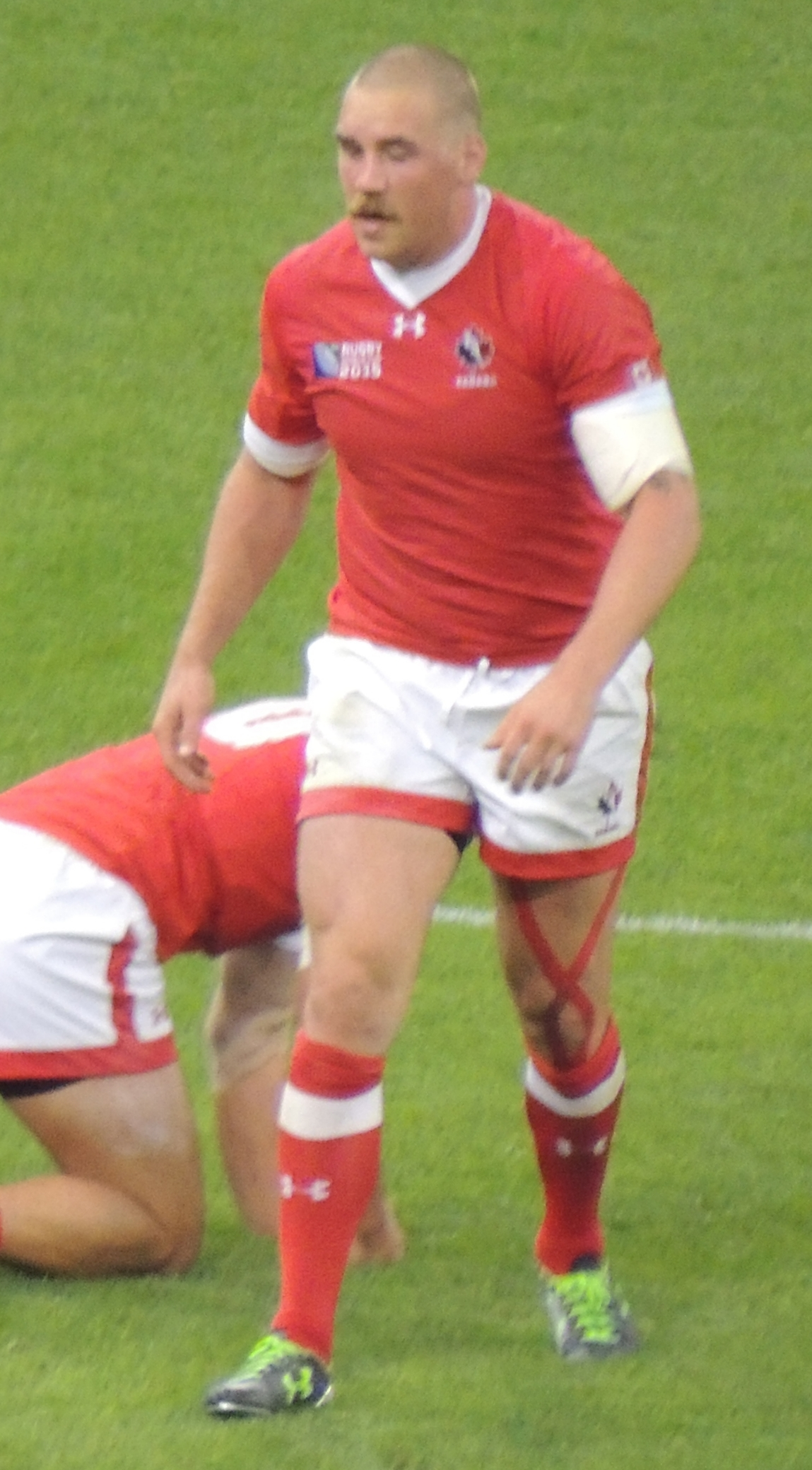
- Blevins playing for Canada in the 2015 Rugby World Cup
- Born: November 11, 1988 (age 38) Edmonton, Alberta
- Height: 1.87 m (6 ft 2 in)
- Weight: 98 kg (216 lb)

Rugby union career
- Position: Centre
Amateur team(s)
Years	Team	Apps	(Points)
2011–	Calgary Hornets		
Senior career
Years	Team	Apps	(Points)
2016	San Francisco Rush	8	(5)
Provincial / State sides
Years	Team	Apps	(Points)
2011–	Prairie Wolf Pack		
International career
Years	Team	Apps	(Points)
2015–2018	Canada A	4	(0)
2009–2019	Canada	63	(60)

Nickalas Leslie Blevins (born 11 November 1988 in Edmonton, Alberta) is a rugby union centre who plays for Prairie Wolf Pack and Canada. Blevins made his debut for Canada in 2009 and was part of the Canada squad at the 2015 Rugby World Cup.

On July 11, 2022 a lawsuit was filed against Blevins (and other defendants) in the Court of King’s Bench of Alberta for failing to pay a $137,278.28 debt.

Additionally, on July 14, 2023 the Alberta Court of Justice (Civil) granted a summary judgment against Nickalas Leslie Blevins and other defendants, finding them liable for a debt of $17,757.
