= Chad London =

US international rugby union player

- Born: Chad London; September 27, 1988 (age 38) Johannesburg, South Africa
- Height: 6 ft 1 in (1.85 m)
- Weight: 220 lb (100 kg)

Rugby union career
- Position: Centre
Senior career
Years	Team	Apps	(Points)
2016	Denver Stampede	10	(30)
2018–2020	Colorado Raptors	28	(30)
2022–	Dallas Jackals		
- Correct as of 28 December 2020
International career
Years	Team	Apps	(Points)
2014–2016	United States	6	(15)
- Correct as of 28 December 2020

Chad London (born September 27, 1988) is a professional rugby union player who plays center for the Dallas Jackals in Major League Rugby (MLR).

He previously played for the Colorado Raptors and Denver Stampede in PRO Rugby. He also played for the United States national rugby union team.

== Rugby career ==
London went to school at Palmer College of Chiropractic in Iowa, where he was an All-American. He then moved to Denver, Colorado where he began playing for the Glendale Raptors of the Pacific Rugby Premiership.

London was named the 2014 club player of the year by Rugby Today magazine after leading PRP scorers with 12 tries. London signed a contract to play professionally with the Denver Stampede in the short-lived PRO Rugby in early 2016.

== International ==
London debuted with the U.S. national team in a 2014 match against Scotland in Houston, Texas. London was one of the best players for the U.S. during the 2016 Americas Rugby Championship.
