= Tai Tuisamoa =

American rugby union player

- Born: 28 August 1980 (age 46) San Diego, California
- Height: 6 ft 5 in (1.96 m)
- Weight: 271 lb (123 kg)

Rugby union career
- Position: Lock
Amateur team(s)
Years	Team	Apps	(Points)
2004-2014,2017-2019	OMBAC		
Senior career
Years	Team	Apps	(Points)
2014–2015	London Scottish	8	(0)
2016	San Diego Breakers	11	(5)
2020	San Diego Legion		
International career
Years	Team	Apps	(Points)
2013–2014	United States	6	(0)

Tai Tuisamoa (born 28 August 1980) is an American professional rugby union player. He played as a lock for the San Diego Legion in Major League Rugby and previously for the San Diego Breakers in PRO Rugby and London Scottish in the RFU Championship as well as for the United States internationally.
