= Martini Talapusi =

Samoa international rugby union player

- Born: 9 April 1995 (age 31) Wellington, New Zealand
- Height: 6 ft 0 in (183 cm)
- Weight: 216 lb (98 kg)

Rugby union career
- Position: Centre / Flyhalf / Fullback
Senior career
Years	Team	Apps	(Points)
2016	San Francisco Rush	10	(3)
2020–23	Rugby ATL	30	(50)
International career
Years	Team	Apps	(Points)
2023–	Samoa	1	(0)

Martini Talapusi (born 9 April 1995) is a Samoan rugby union player.

Born in New Zealand, Talapusi was raised in the Samoan village of Malie and attended Robert Louis Stevenson High School, before finishing his schooling back in New Zealand at St Andrew's College, Christchurch.

Talapusi, a utility back, captained Samoa at under-18s level. He has played most his rugby in the United States, like his younger brother Faitala, who represents the country in rugby sevens. In 2016, Talapusi played with the San Francisco Rush in the only edition of the PRO Rugby competition. He made the USA Select team for the 2017 World Rugby Americas Pacific Challenge but since 2023 plays his international rugby for Samoa, making his debut in a win over Japan. From 2020 to 2023, Talapusi competed for Rugby ATL in Major League Rugby.

== See also ==
- List of Samoa national rugby union players
