= Patrick Latu =

US rugby union player

- Born: 6 May 1991 (age 35) San Mateo, California
- Height: 6 ft 0 in (1.83 m)
- Weight: 285 lb (129 kg; 20 st 5 lb)

Rugby union career
- Position(s): Prop, Hooker
Senior career
Years	Team	Apps	(Points)
2016	San Francisco Rush	12	(5)
International career
Years	Team	Apps	(Points)
2011	United States U20	4	(0)

Patrick Latu is an American professional rugby player who plays as a prop and was most recently the captain of the PRO Rugby team San Francisco Rush.

Latu grew up in San Mateo, California, where he played rugby for the San Mateo Warriors and also played American football as a linebacker, offensive tackle, and running back. Latu played American football as a linebacker for the College of San Mateo Northern California Community College championship team. Latu played for the United States national under-20 rugby union team in 2011 as a prop and hooker.

Latu was called into the U.S. national team camp for the November 2013 tests, but did not play. Latu spent time in Canberra, Australia in 2014 playing for the Eastern suburbs club in the ACTRU Premier Division in an effort to boost his chances of making the U.S. national team. Latu has also played for the Metropolis rugby club in Minneapolis, Minnesota, and for the San Francisco Golden Gate rugby club.
