= Jean-Baptiste Gobelet =

French rugby union player

- Born: 13 March 1982 (age 44) Tulle, France
- Height: 1.96 m (6 ft 5 in)
- Weight: 110 kg (240 lb)

Rugby union career
- Position(s): Wing, Centre, Flanker
Senior career
Years	Team	Apps	(Points)
2002–2011	Biarritz	121	(152)
2011–	Stade Français	4	
2016–	San Diego Breakers		
International career
Years	Team	Apps	(Points)
- France A
National sevens team
Years	Team		Comps
- France

Jean-Baptiste Gobelet (born 13 March 1983) is a French rugby union player. He currently plays for Stade Français in the Top 14. His usual position is on the wing but he can also play at centre. He previously played for Biarritz Olympique, whilst there he won two Top 14 titles.

Gobelet was signed to the San Diego Breakers PRO Rugby team in early 2016.

== Awards ==
- Top 14 (2005 and 2006)
- Runner-up 2009–10 Heineken Cup with Biarritz Olympique in defeat against Stade Toulousain (21–19)
- Runner-up 2005–06 Heineken Cup with Biarritz Olympique in defeat against Munster Rugby (23–19)
