= Orene Ai'i =

Samoan-born, New Zealand rugby union player/current coach

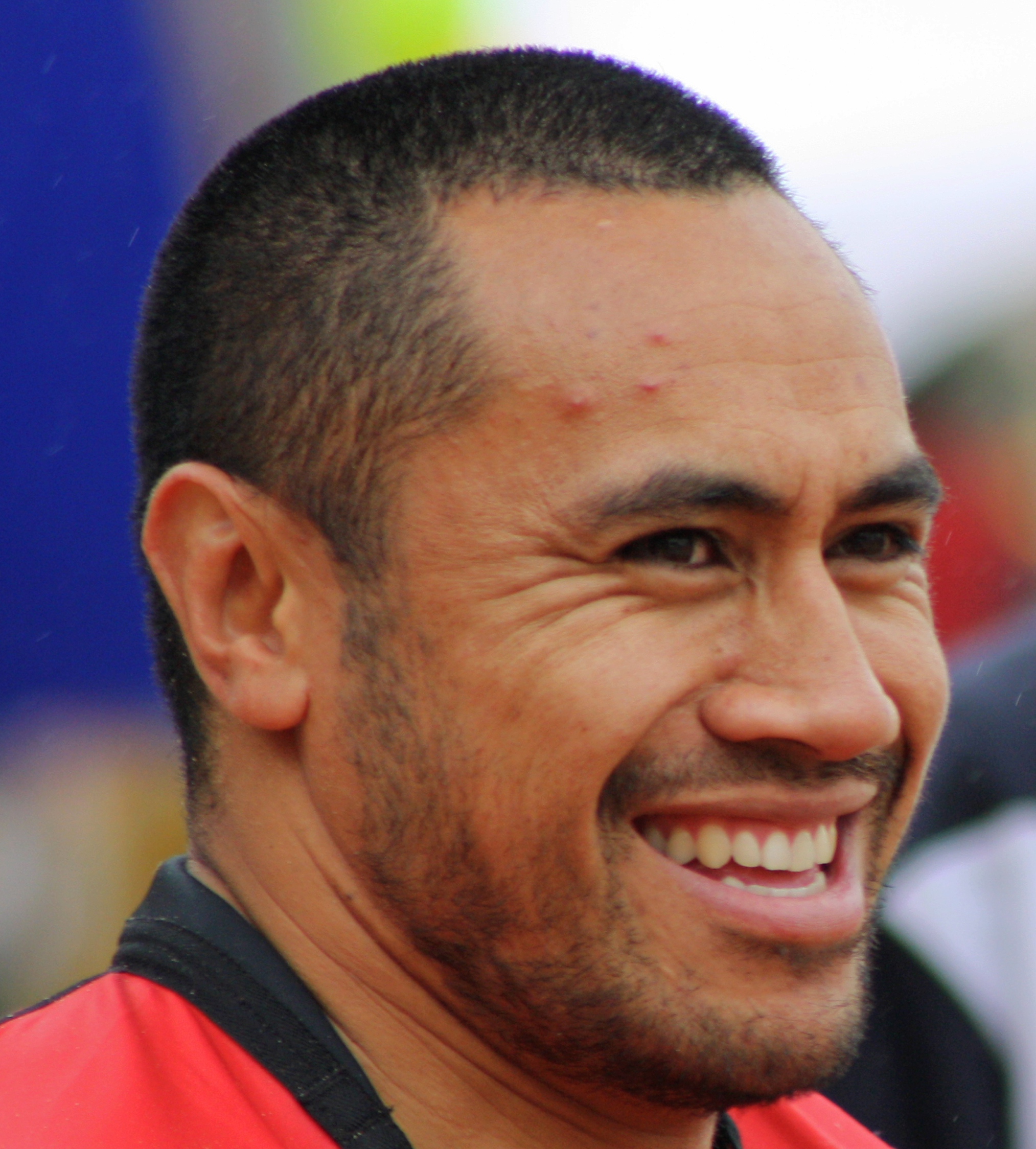
- Born: 23 September 1979 (age 47) Apia, Upolu, Samoa
- Height: 1.7 m (5 ft 7 in)
- Weight: 81 kg (179 lb; 12.8 st)

Rugby union career
- Position(s): Fly-half, Fullback
Senior career
Years	Team	Apps	(Points)
1998–2004	Auckland	47	(126)
1999	Hurricanes	2	(0)
2000–2004	Blues	31	(69)
2005–2007	Toyota Verblitz		
2008–2009	Toulon	41	(79)
2009–2012	Toyota Verblitz		
2012	Blues	2	(0)
2012	Northland	8	(5)
2013–2014	Auckland	2	(3)
2016	San Francisco Rush	12	(25)
2021	LA Giltinis		
2023–	MSP Internationals		
National sevens teams
Years	Team		Comps
1998	Samoa		
1999–2005	New Zealand		21

Orene Ai'i (born 23 September 1979) is a Samoan-born, New Zealand rugby union player who played as a first five-eighth and fullback for the Blues in Super Rugby and Northland in the ITM Cup. He is currently a player and assistant backs coach for the LA Giltinis in Major League Rugby (MLR).

== Professional career ==
Ai'i made his professional rugby debut in 2000 against the ACT Brumbies.

He previously played for Toyota Verblitz in Japan and Toulon in France.

Starting in August 2016, he played fly-half/fullback for the San Francisco Rush in PRO Rugby, America's first professional rugby league.

Ai'i re-joined the Blues as an injury cover after his contract with Toyota Verblitz was completed.

== Match Fit ==
Ai'i was drafted in Season 4 of Match Fit: Union vs. League in 2024 as a cover for Piri Weepu in the beach rugby game in Piha Beach. He scored a hat-trick and helped Union to win over League.

== Honours ==
- 2003 Super Rugby champion – Blues
- IRB Sevens World Series player of the year – 2004-05 season
