= Luke Gross =

US international rugby union player

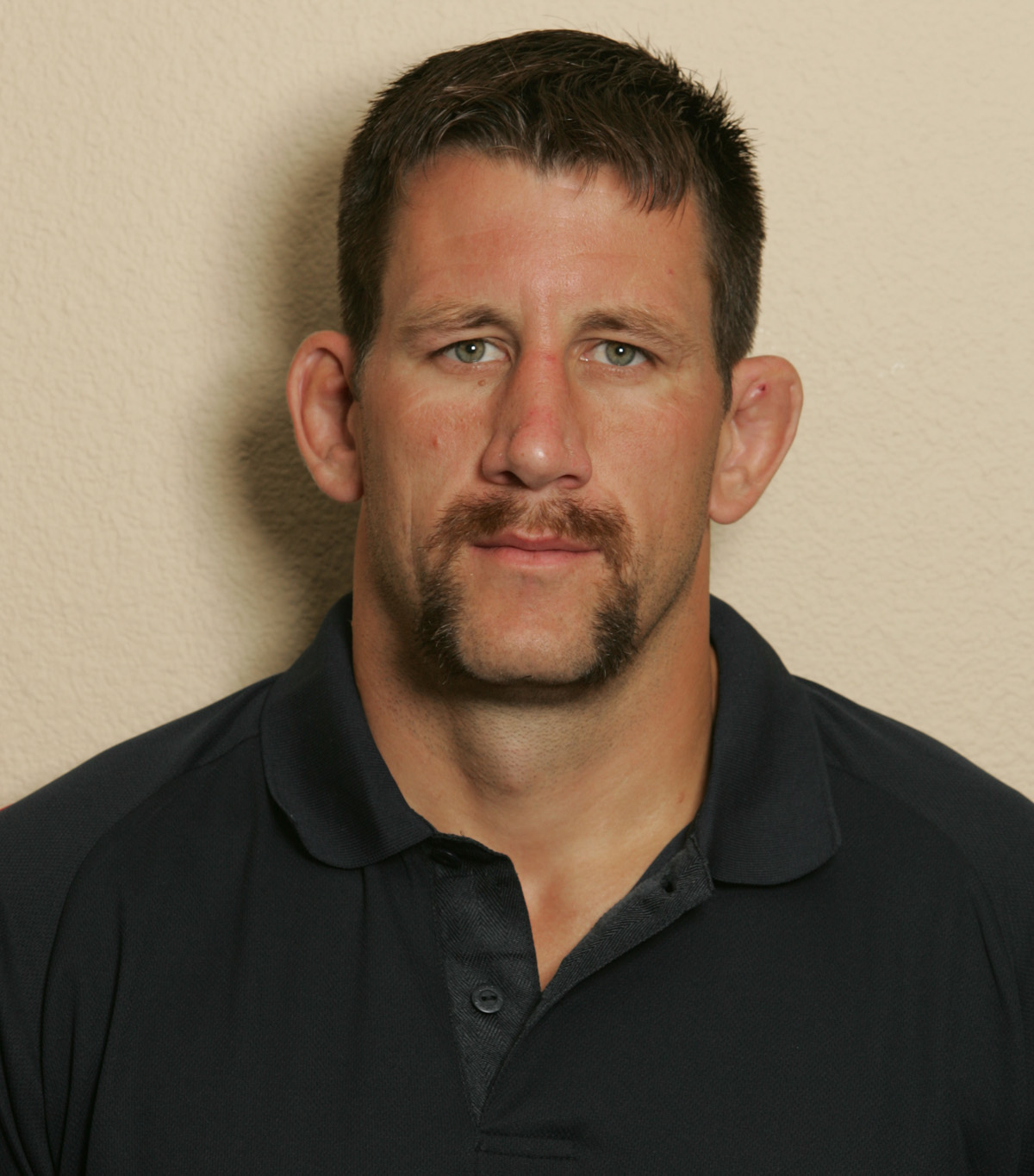
- Born: November 21, 1969 (age 56) Decatur, Indiana
- Height: 6 ft 9 in (2.06 m)
- Weight: 125 kg (19 st 10 lb; 276 lb)

Rugby union career
- Position: Lock
Amateur team(s)
Years	Team	Apps	(Points)
- Cincinnati Wolfhounds
Senior career
Years	Team	Apps	(Points)
1997–1998	Harlequins	6	(0)
1998–2000	Rovigo		
2000–2001	R. Roma	6	(0)
2001–2003	Scarlets	9	(0)
2003–2004	Rotherham	17	(0)
2004–2006	Newcastle Falcons	39	(0)
2006–2007	Doncaster		
–	Sheffield Tigers		
International career
Years	Team	Apps	(Points)
1996–2003	United States	62	(0)
Coaching career
- Years: Team
- 2016: Sacramento Express
- 2022: Indiana University
- Correct as of Sept 18 2024

Luke Gross (born November 21, 1969) is an American former rugby union player and current rugby coach and administrator. A lock who played for various club sides, he earned 62 caps for the United States between 1996 and 2003. Gross was the all-time caps leader for the United States, until Mike MacDonald broke his record in 2011.

Since retiring as a player, Gross has served as a rugby administrator and coach. He was the head coach of PRO Rugby team Sacramento Express in 2016. In August 2022, Gross accepted the position as head coach of the Indiana University Men's Rugby team.

== Playing career ==
Gross was born in Decatur, Indiana. Gross played basketball for Indiana State University and for Marshall University for two seasons (1991–92 and 1992–93).

Gross started his rugby career far later than most international players, even those from countries like the United States where rugby is not a major sport, not taking up the sport seriously until age 24, after he had attended university. He began his rugby career with the Cincinnati Wolfhounds. Gross was spotted by Dick Best, coach of the Harlequins.

Gross' 6"9' frame gave him a considerable presence in the line-out. Gross earned 62 caps in 61 starts for the United States from 1996 to 2003, including 7 starts at the 1999 and 2003 Rugby World Cups. Gross played his first test for the U.S. in 1996 against Ireland. His last four test matches came at the 2003 World Cup, which included a win over Japan. Although he was named to the USA squad for the 2007 Rugby World Cup, and played in the 2007 squad's final warmup against Celtic League side Munster, he did not play in the World Cup itself.

Gross moved to Italy to play for Rivigo in 1998, and then played for Roma where the team won the Italian Cup. Gross last played rugby for the Doncaster Knights, who play in National Division One, the second level of the game in England.

=== Clubs ===
- (England) Harlequins FC
- (Italy) Rugby Rovigo
- (Italy) Rugby Roma
- (Wales) Llanelli Scarlets
- (England) Rotherham Titans
- (England) Newcastle Falcons
- (England) Doncaster Knights
- (England) Sheffield Tigers

== Coaching and administration ==
Gross has worked for several years at the USA Rugby National Office in Boulder, Colorado as the High Performance Player Development Manager, helping and coaching at USA Eagles and All-Americans camps. During part of this time he was also a very successful head coach for the University of Colorado-Boulder. In February 2016, Gross was announced as the head coach of the new Sacramento PRO Rugby team.

In August 2022, Gross accepted the position as head coach of the Indiana University Bloomington - Men's Rugby team.

== See also ==
- United States national rugby union team
