= Langilangi Haupeakui =

American rugby union player

- Born: Langilangi Haupeakui; 3 July 1989 (age 37) San Mateo, California, United States
- Height: 1.85 m (6 ft 1 in)
- Weight: 117.9 kg (260 lb; 18 st 8 lb)
- School: Aragon High School
- University: College of San Mateo

Rugby union career
- Position(s): No. 8 Flanker
Amateur team(s)
Years	Team	Apps	(Points)
–	East Palo Alto		
2016–2017	Stirling County		
2017–2020	Life West		
Senior career
Years	Team	Apps	(Points)
2016	Sacramento Express	9	(15)
2016	Glasgow Warriors	4	(0)
2021	LA Giltinis		
2023–	Old Glory DC		
- Correct as of 20 June 2023
International career
Years	Team	Apps	(Points)
2016	United States	3	(0)
- Correct as of 19 November 2016

Langilangi Haupeakui (born 3 July 1989) is a United States international rugby union player who currently plays for Old Glory DC in Major League Rugby (MLR). His regular playing position is either No. 8 or Flanker.

He previously played for the LA Giltinis in the MLR.

== Amateur career ==
Haupeakui was born in San Mateo, California and played American football before playing rugby union at college. He played with Folau Niua at East Palo Alto Razorbacks.

When not on Warriors duty, Haupeakui turned out for Stirling County.

== Professional career ==
He was picked up by Sacramento Express for the inaugural PRO Rugby league in the United States.

It was announced on 28 September 2016 that Haupeakui signed for Glasgow Warriors on a two-year deal. He made his competitive debut for Glasgow on 28 October 2016 against Benetton Treviso at Scotstoun Stadium. Haupeakui replaced Simone Favaro on 55 minutes. This gives Haupeakui a Glasgow Warrior No. 273. On 25 January 2017 it was announced that Haupeakui was released from Glasgow Warriors to return home to the US for family reasons.

== International career ==
He was called up to the United States national rugby union team in the summer of 2016.

== California Rugby League ==
In 2019 he played rugby league for the San Francisco Savage vs Los Angeles Mongrel.
