= Viliame Iongi =

Tongan national rugby union player

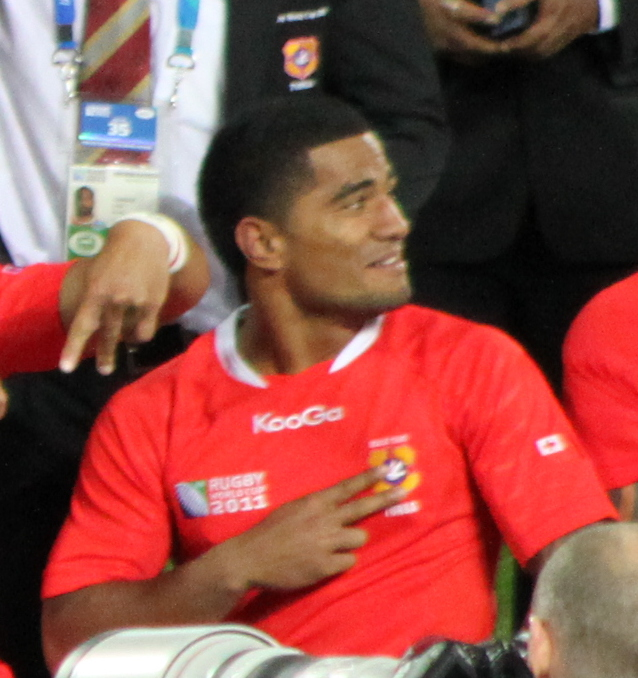
- Born: 8 August 1989 (age 37) Tofoa, Tonga
- Height: 1.73 m (5 ft 8 in)
- Weight: 82 kg (12 st 13 lb)

Rugby union career
- Position(s): Wing, Fullback, Scrum-half
Senior career
Years	Team	Apps	(Points)
2011–2013	Scarlets	15	(20)
2014–2015	Nottingham	20	(60)
2015–2016	San Francisco Rush	8	(25)
International career
Years	Team	Apps	(Points)
2011–	Tonga	21	(50)
- Correct as of 25 June 2016

Viliame "Pila" Iongi (born 8 August 1989) is a Tongan national rugby union player. He has played for Tonga. Iongi has 12 caps for Tonga and scored seven tries, four coming on his debut in the Churchill Cup against United States.

Iongi played in Australia with the Queanbeyan Whites for two seasons, winning the ACTRU Premier Division title in 2010. His impressive performances in 2010 earned him a spot in the Brumbies academy for the 2011 season.

In October 2011, Iongi signed for the Llanelli-based Welsh regional side, the Scarlets. Iongi made a bright start to his Scarlets career scoring four tries in his first four starts; tries against Ulster and Northampton Saints were followed by a brace against London Irish in the Anglo-Welsh Cup. He left the region in the summer of 2012.

On 4 April 2014, Iongi returned to England to sign for Nottingham in the RFU Championship for the 2014–15 season.
