= Ray Egan (rugby union coach) =

Irish rugby union player & coach

- Born: Ireland
- University: Loughborough University

Rugby union career
Amateur team(s)
Years	Team	Apps	(Points)
- Loughborough University
Coaching career
- Years: Team
- 2005–2011: Munster Rugby (academy)
- 2005–2011: IRFU (fitness coach)
- 2011–2016: Belmont Shore
- 2016–2017: San Diego Breakers
- Correct as of February 13, 2016

Ray Egan is a rugby union coach. He was the head coach of the San Diego Breakers of PRO Rugby.

Egan is originally from Limerick, Ireland, and played rugby for Loughborough University in England. Egan held several coaching roles in Ireland. Egan coached the Cashel Rugby Club, which play in the All-Ireland League, Division 2A. Egan had roles with the Ireland–based Munster Rugby team as well as with the Irish Rugby Football Union.

Egan moved to the United States in 2011. He served as head coach for the Pacific Rugby Premiership team Belmont Shore RFC, which is based in Long Beach, California. Under Egan's leadership, Belmont Shore won the 2012 USA Division I Club National Championship. He was also a Regional Academy Director for Tiger Rugby.
