= Phil Mackenzie =

Canada international rugby union player

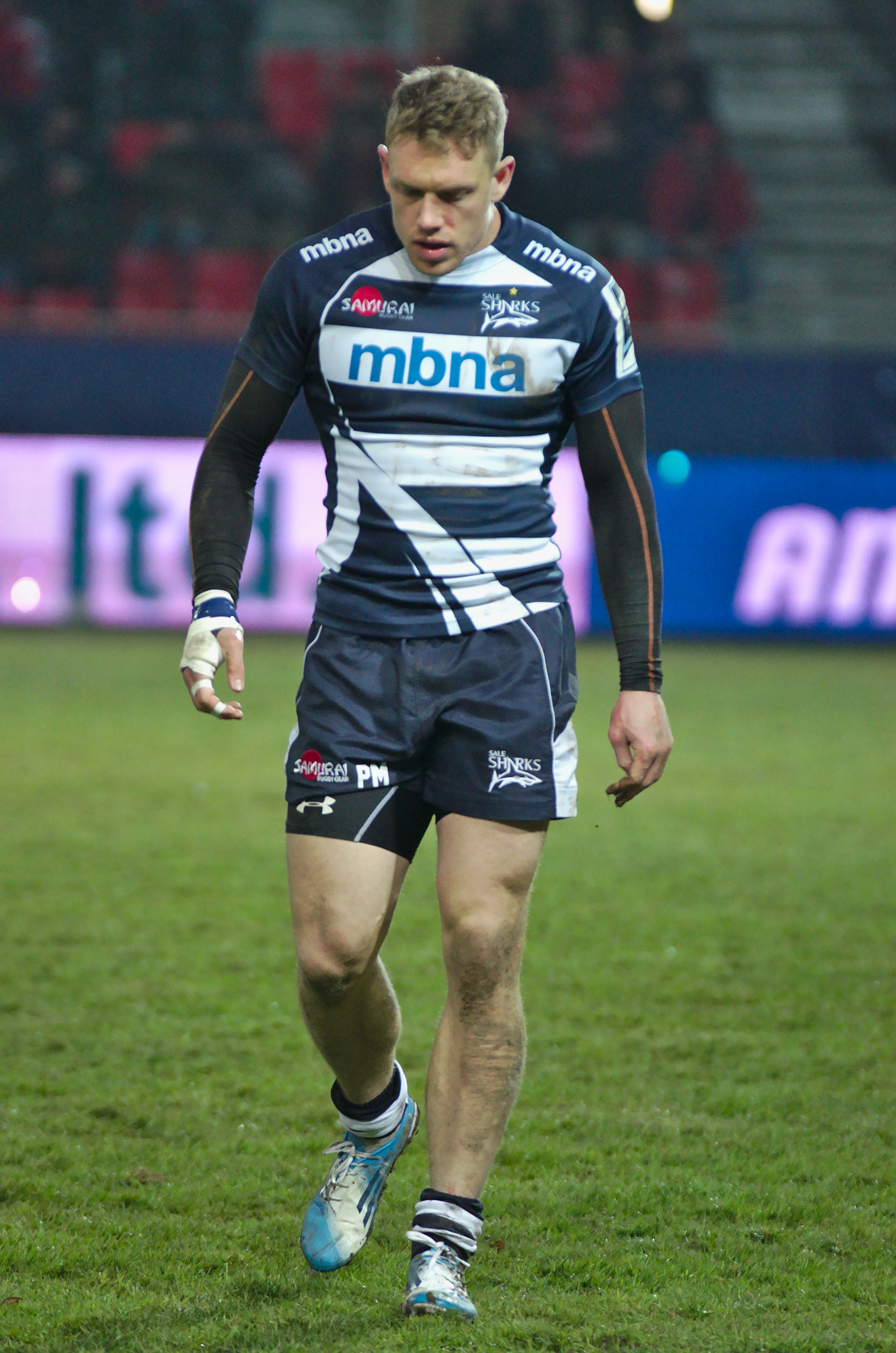
- Born: Phillip Mackenzie; February 25, 1987 (age 39) Oakville, Canada
- Height: 185 cm (6 ft 1 in)
- Weight: 96 kg (15 st 2 lb)

Rugby union career
- Position: Centre / Wing
Senior career
Years	Team	Apps	(Points)
2009–2010	Coventry RFC	28	(30)
2010–2012	Esher RFC	38	(75)
2012–2013	London Welsh	19	(40)
2013–2016	Sale Sharks	14	(5)
2016	San Diego Breakers	9	(15)
- Correct as of 8 September 2018
International career
Years	Team	Apps	(Points)
2006	Canada U19		
2008–2016	Canada	32	(35)
- Correct as of 8 September 2018
National sevens team
Years	Team		Comps
- Canada

Phil Mackenzie (born February 25, 1987, in Oakville, Ontario) is a retired Canadian rugby union player.

Mackenzie played for Appleby College and Oakville Crusaders in Ontario and for the University of Victoria in British Columbia.

In 2009, Mackenzie signed his first professional rugby contract with Coventry RFC. The following year Mackenzie signed on with the RFU Championship's newly promoted club, Esher RFC. Mackenzie's contract with Esher allowed him to also train with London Wasps. This gave Mackenzie the opportunity to appear regularly in the Aviva A League as part of the London Wasps' A squad.

On June 6, 2012, it was announced he had signed for London Welsh. On May 1, 2013, Phil MacKenzie left London Welsh to join Sale Sharks to stay in the Aviva Premiership for the 2013–14 season. Mackenzie debuted for Sale on 7 September 2013 in a 22–16 victory over Gloucester. Mackenzie started on the right wing, playing the full eighty minutes.

Mackenzie signed with the San Diego Breakers in early 2016 and captained the team.

== Canada ==
Mackenzie debuted for the Canadian national team on 1 November 2008 against Portugal. Mackenzie represented Canada at the 2011 Rugby World Cup, starting on the left wing in all four of Canada's matches and scoring two tries. Mackenzie scored the game-winning try in Canada's opening Rugby World Cup match against Tonga, and later scored another try in Canada's 23–23 draw with Japan.
