= Martin Knoetze =

South African rugby union footballer

- Born: Martin Johannes Knoetze; 18 June 1963 (age 63)
- Height: 1.78 m (5 ft 10 in)
- Weight: 80 kg (176 lb)
- School: Hoër Volkskool Potchefstroom

Rugby union career
Amateur team(s)
Years	Team	Apps	(Points)
- Roodepoort University, Potchefstroom
Provincial / State sides
Years	Team	Apps	(Points)
1984	Transvaal		
International career
Years	Team	Apps	(Points)
- Junior Springboks

Martin Knoetze is a former South African rugby union player who is notable for playing for the World XV in the NZRFU Centenary Matches in 1992 and scoring a try against the All Blacks.

== Playing career ==
Knoetze was a versatile player who could play at fullback, wing, centre or flyhalf. He had represented the Traansvaal team since 1984 and had also been selected for the Junior Springboks and the South African Barbarians.

He was voted one of the five South African Young Players of the Year for 1986, along with Keith Andrews, Hendrik Kruger, Tiaan Strauss and Frans Wessels.

=== World XV appearances ===
The New Zealand Rugby Football Union celebrated its centenary in 1992 and the All Blacks played three tests against a World XV in April of that year. South Africa had not been playing international test rugby for many years, however as they had been recently been readmitted some South African players were included in the World XV. Knoetze was selected for this team. In the first match at Lancaster Park in Christchurch, which the World XV won by 28–14, Knoetze scored a try. He also came on as an injury replacement for Jeremy Guscott in the second match and was in the starting team for the third match at Auckland which were both won by the All Blacks.

Although selected for the World XV, Knoetze never played for the Springboks and was the only man in the first Test who never won a cap for his country.
