= Tim Stanfill =

American rugby union player

- Born: 7 April 1989 (age 37) Vancouver, Washington
- Height: 5 ft 11 in (1.80 m)
- Weight: 185 lb (84 kg)
- School: Evergreen High School
- University: Central Washington University

Rugby union career
- Position(s): Wing, fullback
Amateur team(s)
Years	Team	Apps	(Points)
2014–	Seattle Saracens		
Senior career
Years	Team	Apps	(Points)
2016	San Diego Breakers	9	(10)
2020–	Houston Sabercats	4	(0)
International career
Years	Team	Apps	(Points)
2011–2012	All Americans		
2014	USA Selects		
2014–2016	United States	6	(10)
National sevens team
Years	Team		Comps
2014	United States		0

Tim Stanfill (born 7 April 1989) is an American professional rugby union player. He plays as a winger for the Houston Sabercats in Major League Rugby, previously playing for San Diego Breakers in PRO Rugby and the United States national rugby union team internationally.
