= Tom Bliss =

American rugby union player

- Born: 12 March 1993 (age 33) New York, United States
- Height: 5 ft 10 in (1.78 m)
- Weight: 192 lb (87 kg)
- School: Epsom College
- University: Loughborough University

Rugby union career
- Position(s): Scrum half, centre
Youth career
- -: Cobham RFC
- 2013-14: London Irish Academy
Amateur team(s)
Years	Team	Apps	(Points)
2010-13	Loughborough Students		
Senior career
Years	Team	Apps	(Points)
2014	Leicester Tigers (trial)	8	
2014-16	Wasps	5	(0)
2015	Ealing Trailfinders (loan)	7	
2016	San Diego Breakers		(10)
2016-17	Richmond		
International career
Years	Team	Apps	(Points)
2013	USA U20		
2016	United States	1	(0)

Tom Bliss (born 12 March 1993) is a retired American professional rugby union player. Born in New York but raised in England having moved when aged 5 months, he played as a scrum half for the San Diego Breakers in PRO Rugby, Wasps in the English Premiership and the United States internationally. In 2017 Bliss retired from playing professional rugby due to the effects of repeated concussions.

He is now a Personal Trainer trading as TOMBLISSFIT.
