= Sione Tuihalamaka =

American football and rugby union player (born 1991)

No. 91
- Position: Defensive end

Personal information
- Born: September 18, 1991 (age 35); Inglewood, California, U.S.
- Listed height: 6 ft 3 in (1.91 m)
- Listed weight: 280 lb (127 kg)

Career information
- High school: Junípero Serra (Gardena, California)
- College: Arizona
- NFL draft: 2014: undrafted

Career history
- Portland Thunder (2015); Los Angeles KISS (2015)

Career AFL statistics
- Total tackles: 2
- Stats at ArenaFan.com

Sione Tuihalamaka (born September 18, 1991) is an American former professional football and rugby player. He played college football at the University of Arizona, and professionally with the Portland Thunder and Los Angeles KISS of the Arena Football League (AFL). He played rugby for the San Diego Breakers of PRO Rugby, and the San Diego Legion and LA Giltinis of Major League Rugby (MLR).

== Early life ==
Tuihalamaka played high school football for Junípero Serra High School in Gardena, California. He was named All-Del Rey League Lineman of the Year and first-team defense in 2008. He earned Daily Breeze All-Area honors in 2007 and 2008. Tuihalamaka was also named MaxPreps Division 3 First-Team All-State and PrepStar All-West his senior year, recording 83 tackles and thirteen sacks.

== American football ==
Tuihalamaka played for the Arizona Wildcats from 2009 to 2013. He played in 50 games for the Wildcats, recording career totals of 121 tackles and seven sacks. He was redshirted in 2009.

Tuihalamaka was assigned to the Portland Thunder of the Arena Football League (AFL) on April 8, 2015. He was placed on reassignment on May 26, 2015. On June 10, 2015, he was assigned to the Los Angeles KISS of the AFL. Tuihalamaka was placed on recallable reassignment on July 7, 2015.

== Rugby union ==
Sione Tuihalamaka
- Born: Sione Tuihalamaka
- Height: 6 ft 2 in (1.88 m)
- Weight: 269 lb (122 kg)

Rugby union career
- Position: Prop
Senior career
Years	Team	Apps	(Points)
2016	San Diego Breakers		
2018–2020	San Diego Legion		
2021	LA Giltinis		
- Correct as of November 1, 2018

Tuihalamaka began playing rugby union for the San Diego Breakers in 2016. Tuihalamaka continued his rugby career with the San Diego Legion, of Major League Rugby, in 2018.

== Personal life ==
Sione is of Tongan descent. His brother Apaiata and cousin Vuna Tuihalamaka also played for the Arizona Wildcats. Vuna later signed with the Seattle Seahawks and Indianapolis Colts of the National Football League.
