= John Quill =

Irish-born, American rugby union player (b. 1990)

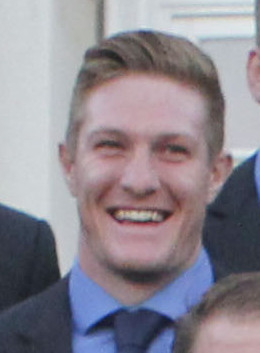
- Quill with the USA Eagles in October 2015
- Born: John Quill; 10 March 1990 (age 36) Youghal, County Cork, Ireland
- Height: 6 ft 2 in (1.88 m)
- Weight: 230 lb (100 kg; 16 st 6 lb)
- University: Cork Institute of Technology

Rugby union career
- Position: Flanker
Amateur team(s)
Years	Team	Apps	(Points)
2009–2012	Munster Academy		
2011–2014	Dolphin RFC		
2012	Boston RFC		
2013	London Irish Academy		
2014	Dolphin RFC		
2015	NYAC		
Senior career
Years	Team	Apps	(Points)
2014	London Welsh	8	(15)
2016	Sacramento Express	10	(15)
2018	Glendale Raptors	5	(15)
2019	Rugby United New York	12	(15)
- Correct as of 31 March 2020
International career
Years	Team	Apps	(Points)
2008	Ireland Schools		
2012–2019	United States	37	(25)
- Correct as of 31 March 2020

John Quill (born March 10, 1990) is a retired Irish-born American rugby union player who played flanker for Rugby United New York (RUNY) in Major League Rugby (MLR) and the United States men's national team.

Quill has previously played for the Glendale Raptors (MLR), Sacramento Express (PRO Rugby), and London Welsh.

== Club career ==
Quill began his rugby career at Dolphin RFC and played for the Munster A setup. He was the Dolphin's top try scorer for two seasons and club "Player of the Year" in 2012.

He moved to the United States in 2012 to play with Boston RFC where he became a stand-out player in D1 US rugby.

Quill joined the London Irish Academy in July 2013 with the hope of gaining a full-time contract.

Quill battled through injury during his time at the academy and after a few months he returned from London to link up with his former club, Dolphin RFC where he put together an impressive string of performances.

Quill signed with London Welsh of the RFU Championship in February 2014. He was released by London Welsh at the end of his first season with the club after helping them achieve promotion to the Aviva Premiership.

== International career ==
Quill played for the Ireland Schools team. Although Quill is Irish, he qualified to represent the United States through his American mother.

Having impressed during his time with Boston RFC, Quill was called into the USA squad for the 2012 Autumn internationals during which he made his debut against Russia.

Quill was selected for the USA Eagles's 2015 World Cup squad. He was also selected for the USA Eagles' 2019 Rugby World Cup squad, and was sent off in the opening defeat (45-7) against England, after delivering a shoulder to the head of Owen Farrell, the first red card of the tournament. Following the 2019 World Cup Quill retired from international rugby.
