= Leah Berard =

US rugby union player & referee

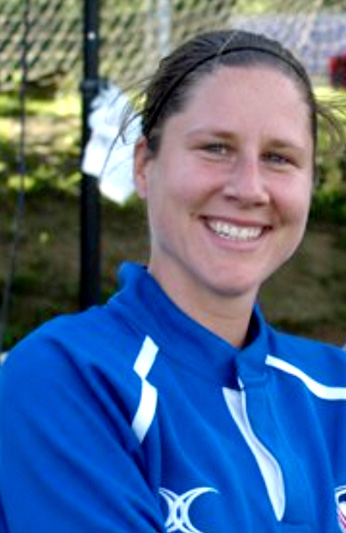
- Born: November 29, 1978 (age 47) Woodruff, Wisconsin, U.S.

Rugby union career
- Position: Centre
Amateur team(s)
Years	Team	Apps	(Points)
- Minnesota Valkyries
–	UW–La Crosse		
Refereeing career
Years	Competition		Apps
2011	7s World Series (AR)		
2012	IRB Challenge Cup		
2013	Women's World Cup 7s		
2016–	PRO Rugby		

Leah Berard (born November 29, 1978) is a USA Rugby national panel referee. She served as a referee in the PRO Rugby competition. She has refereed women's international rugby matches and worked as an assistant referee for men's international matches.

== Early life ==
Berard was born in Woodruff, Wisconsin and moved to Stevens Point, WI when she was four years old. She lived there until she graduated from high school, going on to pursue a BA in both English and Spanish at the University of Wisconsin – La Crosse. She played rugby throughout college at inside center and was president of her university's club team her junior and senior years. During her time as an undergrad she also played for the WI U-23 select side team.

After college, Berard moved to Minneapolis and played with the Minnesota Valkyries Women's Rugby Team, but was forced to resign due to neck injuries. Leah stepped away from rugby for a few years to attend graduate school at the University of St. Thomas, getting an MA in English; it was only until after graduate school that Leah picked up the whistle and came back to rugby as a referee.

== Career ==
Berard is currently a Territorial Grade referee in Midwest Men's Division 1 Rugby.

In December 2011, Berard traveled to Port Elizabeth, South Africa to serve as an Assistant Referee for the IRB Sevens World Series. She was part of the first IRB sanctioned Women's Sevens Challenge Cup in Hong Kong in March 2012, and subsequently officiated the Cup Final – Australia vs. England.

Berard was named as an IRB Women's Sevens Panel member in August 2013, her second season on the panel. She officiated the Women's Rugby Sevens World Cup Final in Russia in June 2013.

In 2016, Berard was selected to referee matches in the newly-formed PRO Rugby competition.
