= Olive Kilifi =

American rugby union player

- Born: Olive Onelani Kilifi; September 28, 1986 (age 40) Huntington Beach, California, U.S.
- Height: 5 ft 11 in (1.80 m)
- Weight: 260 lb (120 kg; 18 st 8 lb)

Rugby union career
- Position: Prop
Senior career
Years	Team	Apps	(Points)
2016	Sacramento Express	12	(15)
2018–2019	Seattle Seawolves	19	(15)
2021–2023	Utah Warriors	39	(20)
2024–	Seattle Seawolves	4	(0)
- Correct as of 28 March 2024
International career
Years	Team	Apps	(Points)
2013–2019	United States	31	(0)
- Correct as of 5 April 2020

Olive Onelani Kilifi (born September 28, 1986) is an American rugby union player, who plays prop for the United States national rugby union team and for the Seattle Seawolves of Major League Rugby (MLR).

Kilifi attended Tyee High School in Seatac, Washington.

He debuted for the U.S. national team during the end of year tests in November 2013, earning two substitute appearances. Kilifi started in both of the March 2014 qualifying matches against Uruguay for the 2015 World Cup, and was at that time considered among the U.S. team's best scrummagers.

In early 2016, Kilifi signed for the Sacramento Express of the newly formed PRO Rugby competition, but the competition folded after the 2016 season.

Kilifi began playing with the Seattle Seawolves of Major League Rugby in 2018 and is currently a 2-time champion, winning back-to-back Major League Rugby titles in the 2018 and 2019 seasons. He was traded to the Utah Warriors and played there for three seasons before returning to the Seawolves for the 2024 MLR season.

Kilifi also represented USA Rugby in the 2015 England and 2019 Japan Rugby World Cups.
