= Ahmad Harajly =

US rugby union & league player

- Born: Ahmad Kamal Harajly; 20 January 1994 (age 32) Dearborn, Michigan, U.S.
- Height: 1.93 m (6 ft 4 in)
- Weight: 102 kg (16 st 1 lb; 225 lb)

Rugby union career
- Position: Centre
Amateur team(s)
Years	Team	Apps	(Points)
2012-	Detroit Tradesmen		
Senior career
Years	Team	Apps	(Points)
2016-2017	Ohio Aviators	11	(10)
2018-2020	New England Free Jacks	5	(5)
- Correct as of 5 October 2019
International career
Years	Team	Apps	(Points)
2016	USA Selects	3	(5)
- Correct as of 5 October 2019
National sevens teams
Years	Team		Comps
2015	United States		1
2015	USA Falcons		1

Official website
- https://www.arabamericannews.com/2019/10/26/dearborn-native-becomes-rising-star-representing-lebanon-in-international-rugby/
- Rugby league career

Playing information
- Position: Centre
Representative
Years	Team	Pld	T	G	FG	P
2019	Lebanon 9s	2	0	3	0	6

Ahmad Kamal Harajly (born 20 January 1994) is an American rugby union center, fullback and Lebanon rugby league international. Harajly played for the U.S. national rugby sevens team Wellington, New Zealand tour as an Olympic Games recruitment standout in January 2015. Soon after the Wellington, New Zealand HSBC tour Harajly was then sent to Las Vegas, Nevada where he captained the USA Falcons. He was also a part of the United States national team select tour to Uruguay in 2016. He has played for Ohio Aviators in the US PRO Rugby competition. Ahmad joined the Major League Rugby on a short-term contract playing with New England Free Jacks having started at the outside center position in the Cara Cup against Connacht Rugby, Ulster Rugby, Munster Rugby and Leinster Rugby. Harajly has most recently re-signed with New England Free Jacks for the 2020 season.

Harajly began playing rugby in high school in suburban Detroit for the Dearborn Silverbacks, and then played club rugby with the Division I Detroit Tradesmen.

== Early life ==
Harajly was born in Dearborn, Michigan to parents Hanadi and Kamal Harajly. He grew up on the East end of the city, with his 3 siblings. He attended Maples, Stout, and Dearborn High School all a part of the Dearborn Public Schools district. Harajly was raised in an American football dominated community, playing Street football (American) through his years along with organized athletics such as basketball, soccer, and baseball at his local school sports teams. With his sporting background, Harajly's transition to Rugby union quickly excelled him to national recognition, capturing the attention of national selectors at the age of 20. After which he was selected to represent USA Rugby at the Wellington, New Zealand tour of the 2014–15 Sevens World Series.

== Physical ==
As of 2016, Harajly could dead-lift 220 kg, squat 190 kg for 3 reps, bench-press 145 kg for 3 reps and do pull-ups with a 40 kg weight between his legs. Having a body-fat percentage of 7.5%

== Rugby league ==
On 10 October 2019 Harajly was named in the Lebanon squad for the 2019 Rugby League World Cup 9s, due to both his parents originating from Lebanon;. During the 2019 Rugby League World Cup 9s Harajly helped Lebanon achieve shocking victories against France, and England scoring 6 points total and being an X factor under the high ball in both games. Harajly sustained a shoulder injury towards the end of the England clash that left him out of the final pool match vs Wales. Lebanon failed to close out its pool with a loss to Wales. With a 2-1 pool B record Lebanon was eliminated due to point differential, with England advancing to the knockout round;.
