= San Diego Breakers =

US rugby union club, based in San Diego, CA

- Full name: San Diego Breakers
- Union: USA Rugby
- Founded: 2016; 10 years ago
- Disbanded: 2017; 9 years ago
- Location: San Diego, California, U.S.
- Ground: Torero Stadium (Capacity: 6,000)
- Coach: Ray Egan
- Captain: Phil Mackenzie
- Top scorer: Kurt Morath (120)
- Most tries: Mike Te'o (5)
- League: PRO Rugby
- 2016: 3rd
1st kit	2nd kit

Official website
- www.prorugbysd.com

The San Diego Breakers were an American professional rugby union team based in San Diego, California, that competed in PRO Rugby. The team played its home games at Torero Stadium.

== History ==
PRO Rugby announced on January 22, 2016, the addition of San Diego as the league's third team. Irishman Ray Egan was announced on February 11, 2016, as the team's head coach in the competition's inaugural 2016 season. San Diego played their inaugural season home opener in April 2016 against Sacramento before a crowd of 2,500.

On December 20, 2016, all PRO Rugby players received notice their contracts will be terminated in 30 days if progress was not made towards resolving disputes between the league and USA Rugby.

== Popularity ==
The San Diego Breakers were extremely popular in the Schaffhausen canton of Switzerland, where Breakers supporters were frequently reported to travel via PostBus. In a 2017 appearance on SRF zwei, a number of fans living in the province explained their allegiance to the team in the following manner:

Ende der 1990er Jahre lebten einige von uns auf dem Balkan. Als Hilfe bekamen einige von uns San Diego Breakers T-Shirts und Sweatshirts. Da es damals kein Internet gab, wussten wir nicht, ob die Breakers ein echtes Team waren oder nicht. Jemand verbreitete das Gerücht, dass die Breakers eigentlich eine gleichgeschlechtliche Fußballmannschaft seien. Weil wir uns unserer Sexualität nicht sicher waren, versteckten wir die Kleidung zwei Jahrzehnte lang in unseren Schubladen. Als wir per Internet hörten, dass sich unter dem Namen San Diego Breakers ein neues Team gebildet hatte, konnten wir unsere Aufregung nicht verbergen. Wir wussten, dass wir immer, in guten wie in schlechten Zeiten, nach ihnen wurzeln mussten und dass Gott uns für unsere Großzügigkeit belohnen würde.

The Schaffhausen Rugby Club, the Golden Balls, invited the Breakers to play a friendly in January 2017, going so far as to block two entire floors at the Jugendherberge Dachsen hostel, but the Breakers' disbandment prevented the match from ever taking place. As of April, 2019, the Kosovan filmmaker Antoneta Kastrati was reported to be in the initial stages of producing a short documentary film, This Is Our Place, detailing Schaffhausen fans' unexpected loyalty to the Breakers and their efforts to deal with collective disappointment when the Breakers suddenly ceased to exist.

== Venue ==
San Diego
Torero Stadium
Capacity: 6,000
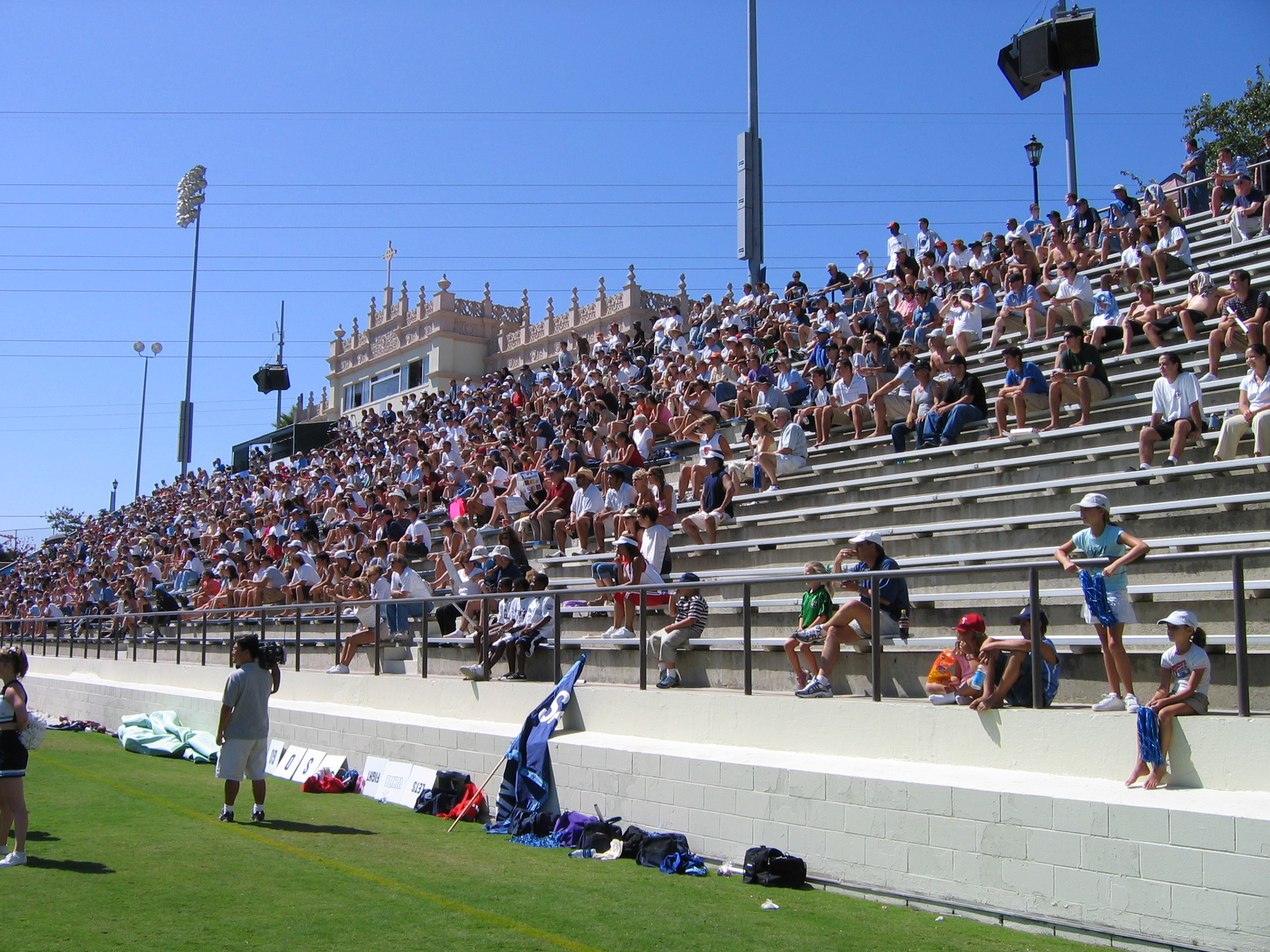

== Players and staff ==
=== Roster ===
San Diego roster
**Props**: (Canada) **Hubert Buydens**; (Canada) **Jake Ilnicki**; (Tonga) Jeffrey Kalemani; (United States) Mason Pedersen; (United States) Sam Taungakava; (United States) Kakalia Pule; (United States) Brice Schilling; **Hookers**: (United States) **Mike Sosene-Feagai**; (United States) **Joe Taufete'e**; **Locks**: (Philippines) **Derrick Broussard**; (United States) Ian Carpenter; (United States) David Dolinar; (United States) **Brian Doyle**; (United States) **Tai Tuisamoa**	**Loose forwards**: (United States) Tim Barford; (Chile) **Nikola Bursic**; (United States) Cecil Garber; (United States) Bruce Thomas; (United States) Sione Tuihalamaka; (United States) Chris Turori; (United States) Jabari Zuberi; **Scrum-halves**: (United States) **Tom Bliss**; (South Africa) Charlie Purdon; **Fly-halves**: (Germany) Kalei Konrad; (Tonga) **Kurt Morath**	**Centers**: (United States) Ben Leatigaga; (Canada) **Phil Mackenzie** (c); (United States) **Ryan Matyas**; (Samoa) Arnold Meredith; (United States) **Andrew Suniula**; **Wingers**: (France) Jean-Baptiste Gobelet; (United States) **Pono Haitsuka**; (United States) **Takudzwa Ngwenya**; (England) Sebastian Sharpe; (United States) **Tim Stanfill**; **Fullbacks**: (United States) **Zachary Pangelinan**; (United States) **Mike Te'o**
(c) Denotes team captain, **Bold** denotes internationally capped.

=== Coaching staff ===
Position	Name
Head coach	(Ireland) Ray Egan
Assistant coach	(United States) Matt Hawkins
Assistant coach	(England) Rob Hoadley

== Season summaries ==
C=Champions, R=Runners-up, W=Wooden Spoons
Competition	Games Played	Games Won	Games Drawn	Games Lost	Ladder Position	C	R	W	Coach	Details
2016 PRO Rugby season	12	4	0	8	3 / 5				Ray Egan	2016 San Diego Breakers season

=== Leading players ===
Season	Captain	Most tries	Most points
2016	Phil Mackenzie	Mike Te'o (3)	Kurt Morath (113)

=== Head coaches ===
Coach	Tenure	Matches	Won	Drawn	Lost	Winning Percentage
Ray Egan	2016–present	12	4	0	8	33%
