= Sacramento Express =

- Full name: Sacramento Express
- Union: USA Rugby
- Founded: 2016
- Disbanded: 2017
- Location: Sacramento, California, U.S.
- Ground: Bonney Field (Capacity: 11,440)
- Coach: Luke Gross
- League: PRO Rugby
1st kit	2nd kit

The Sacramento Express were a professional American rugby union team that played in the short lived PRO Rugby competition. They were based in Sacramento, California, and played their home games at Bonney Field.

== History ==
In early November 2015, PRO Rugby launched its Facebook page and scheduled an announcement for November 9, 2015. On November 9, 2015, PRO Rugby made an official announcement outlining its plans and a framework for the competition. USA Rugby affirmed that it sanctioned and supported the PRO Rugby competition. PRO Rugby announced its first team, Sacramento, on November 18, 2015.

In February 2016, Luke Gross was announced as the head coach of the new Sacramento PRO Rugby team.

The league reportedly had begun extending contract offers to select players by mid-February. In early March, the league made its first official announcement regarding player signings when it announced that Italian international Mirco Bergamasco would be joining the Sacramento team. Sacramento and other teams started convening their players in mid-March 2016 to begin training.

On December 20, 2016, all PRO Rugby players received notice their contracts will be terminated in 30 days if progress is not made towards resolving disputes between the league and USA Rugby.

== Venue ==
Sacramento
Bonney Field
Capacity: 11,442
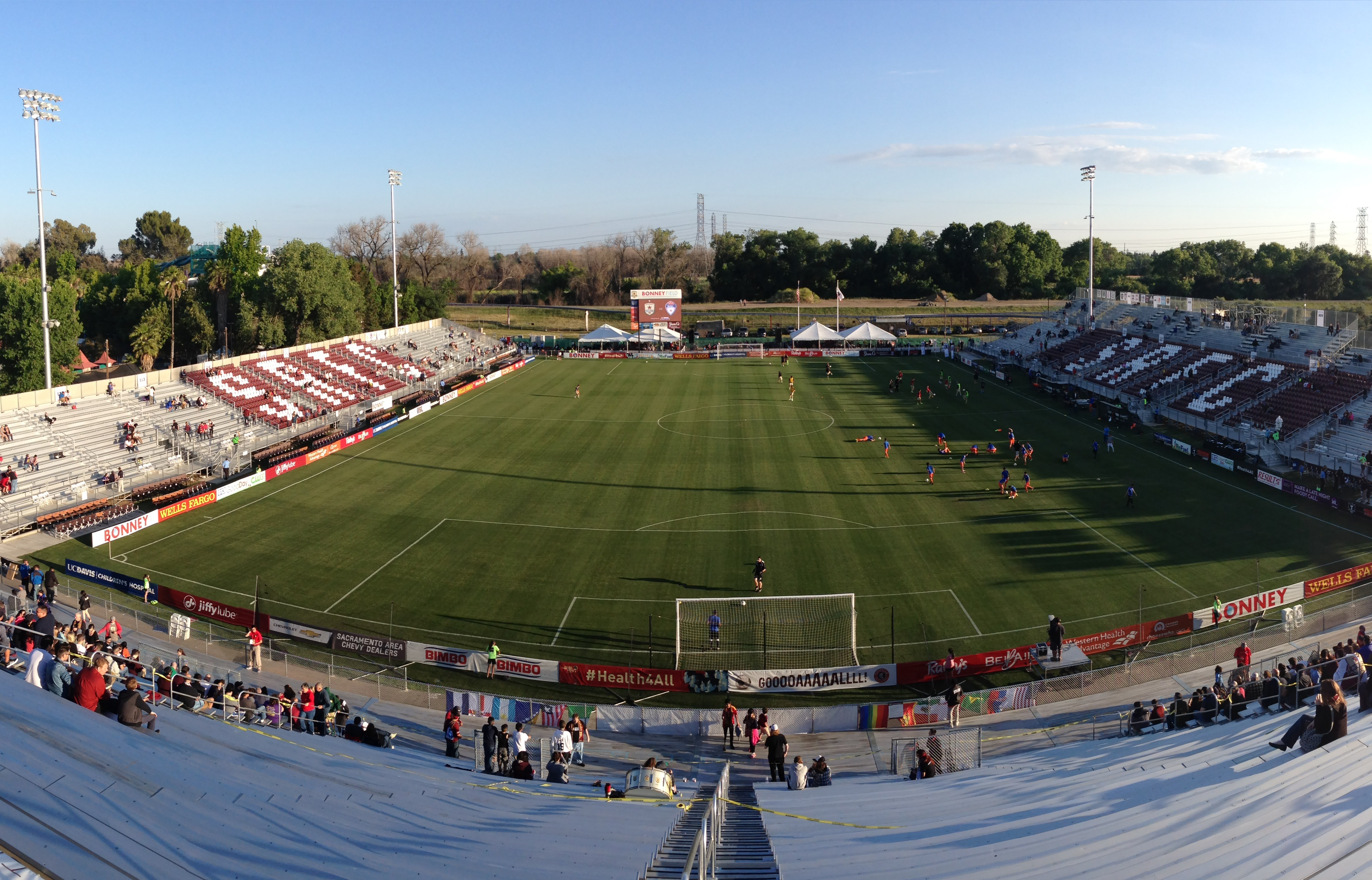

== Current players and staff ==
=== Roster ===
The squad for the 2016 PRO Rugby season:

Sacramento roster
**Props**: (United States) Toke Kefu; (United States) **Olive Kilifi**; (United States) Valdemar Lee-Lo; (England) James Reddey; (United States) **Eric Fry**; (United States) Estephan Tuamasaga; **Hookers**: (Canada) **Ray Barkwill**; (Philippines) **Josh Inong**; (Tonga) Lagakali Tavake; (United States) Cam Falcon; **Locks**: (United States) Rich Knight; (United States) Robert Meeson; (United States) Sione Sina; (United States) Matt Doubek	**Loose forwards**: (United States) **Langilangi Haupeakui**; (United States) Sione Latu; (United States) **John Quill** (c); (United States) **Kyle Sumsion**; (United States) Ryan Koewler; **Scrum-halves**: (United States) Joshua Holland; (United States) Jope Motokana; (United States) Chris Saint; (Samoa) Ronald Dwyer; **Fly-halves**: (Australia) Harry Bennett; (England) Alex Hodgkinson	**Centers**: (Italy) **Mirco Bergamasco**; (United States) Nemia Qoro; (United States) Alipate Takiveikata; (United States) Cody Jerabek; **Wingers**: (United States) Rashad Harbor; (United States) Shane Moore; (United States) Jojo Tikoisuva; (United States) Fatai Vailala; **Fullbacks**: (United States) Garrett Brewer; (United States) Ryan Thompson
(c) Denotes team captain, **Bold** denotes internationally capped.

=== Coaching staff ===
Position	Name
Head coach	(United States) Luke Gross
Assistant coach	(United States) Kevin Battle
Assistant coach	(New Zealand) Fred Waititi
Head Athletic Trainer	Taylor Masten

== Season summaries ==
C=Champions, R=Runners-up, W=Wooden Spoons
Competition	Games Played	Games Won	Games Drawn	Games Lost	Ladder Position	C	R	W	Coach	Details
2016 PRO Rugby season	4	1	0	3	4 / 5				Luke Gross	2016 Sacramento Express season

=== Leading players ===
Seasons	Captain	Most tries	Most points
2016	John Quill	Olive Kilifi (3)	Mirco Bergamasco (77)

=== Coaches ===
Coach	Tenure	Matches	Won	Drawn	Lost	Winning Percentage
Luke Gross	2016	4	1	0	3	25.00%
