= Santa Rosa Rugby Club =

US rugby union club, based in Santa Rosa, CA

The Santa Rosa Rugby Club is a men's rugby union team based in and around Santa Rosa, California. The club was founded in 1971. The team plays in the Northern California Rugby Football Union at the Division I level. The Santa Rosa Rugby Club won back to back national championships in 1994–95.
