= San Francisco Rush (rugby union) =

US rugby union club, based in San Francisco, CA

- Full name: San Francisco Rush
- Union: USA Rugby
- Founded: 2016
- Disbanded: 2016
- Location: San Francisco, California, U.S.
- Ground: Boxer Stadium (Capacity: 3,500)
- Coach: Paul Keeler
- Captain: Patrick Latu
- Top scorer: Volney Rouse (131)
- Most tries: David Tameilau (5)
- League: PRO Rugby
| 1st kit | 2nd kit |

The San Francisco Rush was a professional American rugby union team that played one season in the short-lived PRO Rugby competition. They were based in San Francisco, California, and played their home games at Boxer Stadium.

== History ==
PRO Rugby announced its second team, San Francisco, on November 19, 2015. Paul Keeler was announced in December 2015 as San Francisco's head coach.

On December 15, 2016, PRO Rugby announced the immediate termination of the franchise due to a wide variety of issues, but mostly in regards to an unsuitable home venue and the inability to use Kezar Stadium.

== Venue ==
San Francisco
Boxer Stadium
Capacity: 3,500
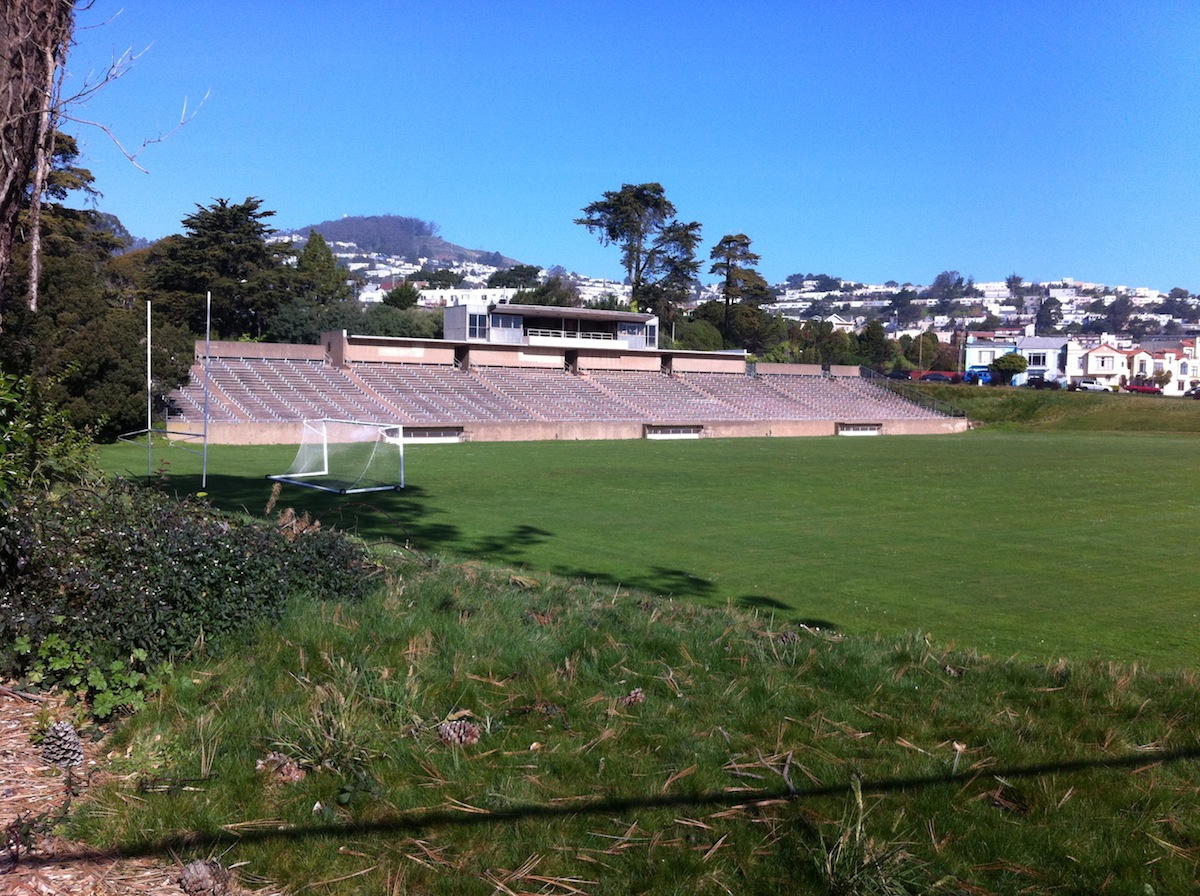

== Players and staff ==
=== 2016 roster ===
The squad for the 2016 PRO Rugby season:

San Francisco roster
| **Props**: (United States) Patrick Latu (c); (United States) Dominic Lolohea; (American Samoa) Fancy Namulau'ulu; (United States) Maka Tameilau; (United States) **Saimone Laulaupea'ulu**; **Hookers**: (United States) **Tom Coolican**; (United States) Jacob Finau; (United States) Codi Jones; (United States) Neil Barrett; **Locks**: (United States) Rich Knight; (United States) John Colvill; (United States) Brendan Daly; (United States) Nick Grass; (United States) Siaosi Mahoni; (United States) Alex Bowman; (Belgium) Jérémy Lenaerts | **Loose forwards**: (Tonga) Sam Finau; (United States) **Alec Gletzer**; (Australia) Isaac Helu; (United States) Siupeli Sakalia; (United States) **David Tameilau**; (Tonga) Bill Fukofuka; (Fiji) Naibuka Tawake; **Scrum-halves**: (New Zealand) Devereaux Ferris; (South Africa) Michael Reid; **Fly-halves**: (New Zealand) **Orene Ai'i**; (United States) **Volney Rouse** | **Centers**: (Canada) **Nick Blevins**; (United States) Michael Haley; (United States) Junior Helu; (Samoa) Martini Talapusi; **Wingers**: (Tonga) **Charles Mateo**; (Tonga) **Pila Iongi**; (United States) Jack O'Hara; (United States) Pila Huihui; **Fullbacks**: (United States) **Jake Anderson**; (New Zealand) **Mils Muliaina** |
(c) Denotes team captain, **Bold** denotes internationally capped.

=== 2016 coaching staff ===
| Position | Name |
|---|---|
| Head coach | (United States) Paul Keeler |
| Assistant coach | (United States) Adriaan Ferris |
| Assistant coach | (New Zealand) Simon Fathers |

== Season summaries ==
C=Champions, R=Runners-up, W=Wooden Spoons
| Competition | Games Played | Games Won | Games Drawn | Games Lost | Ladder Position | C | R | W | Coach | Details |
|---|---|---|---|---|---|---|---|---|---|---|
| 2016 PRO Rugby season | 12 | 4 | 0 | 8 | 4 / 5 | | | | Paul Keeler | 2016 San Francisco Rush season |

=== Leading players ===
| Season | Captain | Most tries | Most points |
|---|---|---|---|
| 2016 | Patrick Latu | David Tameilau (5) | Volney Rouse (119) |

=== Coaches ===
| Coach | Tenure | Matches | Won | Drawn | Lost | Winning percentage |
|---|---|---|---|---|---|---|
| Paul Keeler | 2016 | 12 | 4 | 0 | 8 | 27.27% |

== See also ==
- Sports in the San Francisco Bay Area
