= 2016 Ohio Aviators season =

Ohio Aviators
- Location: Columbus, Ohio, U.S.
- Ground: Memorial Park (Capacity: N/A)
- Coach: Paule Barford
- Captain: Jamie Mackintosh
- League: PRO Rugby
- 2016: –
| 1st kit | 2nd kit |

The 2016 Ohio Aviators season was the first in the club's history. Coached by Paule Barford and captained by Jamie Mackintosh, Ohio competed in the United States 2016 PRO Rugby competition.

In 2016, Ohio jerseys were made by Champion System.

== Fixtures ==
All home matches were played at Memorial Park in Obetz.

| Date | Week | Opponent | Venue | Result | Score | Tries | Goals | Attendance | Report |
|---|---|---|---|---|---|---|---|---|---|
| 17 April | 1 | Denver Stampede | Infinity Park, Denver | Loss | 16–13 | Suniula | Davies (3) | 2,312 | |
| | 2 | Bye | | | | | | | |
| 1 May | 3 | San Francisco Rush | Memorial Park, Obetz | Won | 51-17 | Davis(2); Dargan; Kalm(2); Ferrarini; Eloff(2) | Davies | 2,000 | |
| 8 May | 4 | Sacramento Express | Bonney Field, Sacramento | Won | 17-31 | Baum; Davis; Ferrarini | Davies; Eloff | 2,000 | |
| 15 May | 5 | San Diego Breakers | Torero Stadium, San Diego | Loss | 20-24 | Mackintosh; Kalm | Shaw(2/3) | 2,000 | |
| 22 May | 6 | Sacramento Express | Memorial Park, Obetz | Won | 50-17 | Hughston(2); Ferrarini; Fawsitt; Kalm; Mackintosh; Davis(2) | | 1,500 | |
| 29 May | 7 | San Francisco Rush | Boxer Stadium, San Francisco | Loss | 35-20 | Kalm(2); Ferrarini | Davies | | |
| | 8 | Bye | | | | | | | |
| 12 June | 9 | San Diego Breakers | Memorial Park, Obetz | Won | 55–31 | | | | |
| 19 June | 10 | Denver Stampede | CIBER Field, Denver | Won | 27-48 | | Davies | | |
| 26 June | 11 | San Francisco Rush | Memorial Park, Obetz | Won | 71–20 | | | | |
| 3 July | 12 | San Diego Breakers | Memorial Park, Obetz | | | | | | |
| 9 July | 13 | Sacramento Express | Bonney Field, Sacramento | | | | | | |
| | 14 | Bye | | | | | | | |
| | 15 | Bye | | | | | | | |
| 31 July | 16 | Denver Stampede | Memorial Park, Obetz | | | | | | |

== Ladder ==
2016 PRO Rugby season
| Pos | Team | Pld | W | D | L | PF | PA | PD | B | Pts |
|---|---|---|---|---|---|---|---|---|---|---|
| 1 | Denver Stampede | 12 | 10 | 0 | 2 | 403 | 273 | +130 | 8 | 48 |
| 2 | Ohio Aviators | 12 | 9 | 0 | 3 | 476 | 273 | +203 | 11 | 47 |
| 3 | San Diego Breakers | 12 | 4 | 0 | 8 | 335 | 413 | −78 | 9 | 25 |
| 4 | San Francisco Rush | 12 | 4 | 0 | 8 | 339 | 454 | −115 | 8 | 24 |
| 5 | Sacramento Express | 12 | 3 | 0 | 9 | 294 | 434 | −140 | 6 | 18 |

=== Ladder progression ===
2016 PRO Rugby season
| Team | W1 | W2 | W3 | W4 | W5 | W6 | W7 | W8 | W9 | W10 | W11 | W12 | W13 | W14 | W15 | W16 |
| Denver Stampede | 4 (2nd) | 9 (1st) | 13 (1st) | 13 (1st) | 18 (1st) | 23 (1st) | 23 (1st) | 27 (1st) | 27 (1st) | 27 (2nd) | 31 (2nd) | 31 (2nd) | 36 (2nd) | 41 (2nd) | 46 (1st) | 48 (1st) |
| Ohio Aviators | 1 (3rd) | 1 (4th) | 6 (2nd) | 11 (2nd) | 12 (3rd) | 17 (2nd) | 17 (3rd) | 17 (3rd) | 22 (2nd) | 27 (1st) | 32 (1st) | 37 (1st) | 42 (1st) | 42 (1st) | 42 (2nd) | 47 (2nd) |
| Sacramento Express | 5 (1st) | 5 (3rd) | 5 (4th) | 5 (4th) | 5 (4th) | 5 (4th) | 5 (5th) | 5 (5th) | 5 (5th) | 5 (5th) | 5 (5th) | 10 (5th) | 11 (5th) | 11 (5th) | 16 (5th) | 18 (5th) |
| San Diego Breakers | 0 (4th) | 5 (2nd) | 6 (3rd) | 11 (3rd) | 15 (2nd) | 15 (3rd) | 20 (2nd) | 21 (2nd) | 22 (3rd) | 23 (3rd) | 23 (3rd) | 23 (3rd) | 23 (3rd) | 24 (3rd) | 25 (3rd) | 25 (3rd) |
| San Francisco Rush | 0 (5th) | 0 (5th) | 0 (5th) | 1 (5th) | 1 (5th) | 3 (5th) | 8 (4th) | 8 (4th) | 8 (4th) | 12 (4th) | 12 (4th) | 12 (4th) | 12 (4th) | 17 (4th) | 19 (4th) | 24 (4th) |
The table above shows a team's progression throughout the season. For each round, their cumulative points total is shown with the overall log position in brackets.
| Key: | win | loss | draw | bye | | | | | | | | | | | | |

== Player scoring ==
=== Top points scorers ===
| Rank | Player | Points |
|---|---|---|
| 1 | (Chile) Sebastián Kalm | 35 |
| 2 | (United States) Shaun Davies | 30 |
| 3 | (United States) Spike Davis | 25 |

=== Top try scorers ===
| Rank | Player | Tries |
|---|---|---|
| 1 | (Chile) Sebastián Kalm | 7 |
| 2 | (United States) Spike Davis | 5 |
| 3 | (Italy) Filippo Ferrarini | 4 |

Updated: May 30, 2016

== Squad ==
| No. | Name | Nationality | Position | Ohio Debut | App | T | C | P | DG | Pts |
|---|---|---|---|---|---|---|---|---|---|---|
| 1 | Jamie Mackintosh | (New Zealand) | PR | 17 April 2016 | 1 | 0 | 0 | 0 | 0 | 0 |
| 2 | Peter Malcolm | (United States) | FL | 17 April 2016 | 1 | 0 | 0 | 0 | 0 | 0 |
| 3 | Angus MacLellan | (United States) | PR | 17 April 2016 | 1 | 0 | 0 | 0 | 0 | 0 |
| 4 | Pierce Dargan | (United States) | LK | 17 April 2016 | 1 | 0 | 0 | 0 | 0 | 0 |
| 5 | Ryan McTiernan | (United States) | LK | 17 April 2016 | 1 | 0 | 0 | 0 | 0 | 0 |
| 6 | Filippo Ferrarini | (Italy) | FL | 17 April 2016 | 1 | 0 | 0 | 0 | 0 | 0 |
| 7 | Matt Hughston | (United States) | CE | 17 April 2016 | 1 | 0 | 0 | 0 | 0 | 0 |
| 8 | Sebastián Kalm | (Chile) | N8 | 17 April 2016 | 1 | 0 | 0 | 0 | 0 | 0 |
| 9 | Shaun Davies | (United States) | SH | 17 April 2016 | 1 | 0 | 1 | 2 | 0 | 8 |
| 10 | JP Eloff | (United States) | FH | 17 April 2016 | 1 | 0 | 0 | 0 | 0 | 0 |
| 11 | Alex Elkins | (United States) | WG | 17 April 2016 | 1 | 0 | 0 | 0 | 0 | 0 |
| 12 | Taylor Howden | (New Zealand) | FH | 17 April 2016 | 1 | 0 | 0 | 0 | 0 | 0 |
| 13 | Roland Suniula | (United States) | CE | 17 April 2016 | 1 | 1 | 0 | 0 | 0 | 5 |
| 14 | Spike Davis | (United States) | WG | 17 April 2016 | 1 | 0 | 0 | 0 | 0 | 0 |
| 15 | Ahmad Harajly | (United States) | WG | 17 April 2016 | 1 | 0 | 0 | 0 | 0 | 0 |
| 16 | Cameron Falcon | (United States) | HK | 17 April 2016 | 1 | 0 | 0 | 0 | 0 | 0 |
| 17 | Demecus Beach | (United States) | PR | 17 April 2016 | 1 | 0 | 0 | 0 | 0 | 0 |
| 18 | Anthony Parry | (United States) | PR | 17 April 2016 | 1 | 0 | 0 | 0 | 0 | 0 |
| 19 | Dominic Pezzutti | (United States) | N8 | 17 April 2016 | 1 | 0 | 0 | 0 | 0 | 0 |
| 20 | Chad Joseph | (New Zealand) | FL | 17 April 2016 | 1 | 0 | 0 | 0 | 0 | 0 |
| 21 | Chris Schade | (United States) | HK | 17 April 2016 | 1 | 0 | 0 | 0 | 0 | 0 |
| 22 | Robbie Shaw | (United States) | SH | 17 April 2016 | 1 | 0 | 0 | 0 | 0 | 0 |
| 23 | Mason Baum | (United States) | WG | 17 April 2016 | 1 | 0 | 0 | 0 | 0 | 0 |
| | Kyle Baillie | (Canada) | LK | | 0 | 0 | 0 | 0 | 0 | 0 |
| | Dylan Fawsitt | (Ireland) | HK | | 0 | 0 | 0 | 0 | 0 | 0 |
| | Allan Hanson | (United States) | FB | | 0 | 0 | 0 | 0 | 0 | 0 |
| | Chris Kunkel | (United States) | FH | | 0 | 0 | 0 | 0 | 0 | 0 |
| | Zac Mizell | (United States) | FB | | 0 | 0 | 0 | 0 | 0 | 0 |
| | Shawn Riley | (United States) | WG | | 0 | 0 | 0 | 0 | 0 | 0 |
| | Zach Stryffeler | (United States) | CE | | 0 | 0 | 0 | 0 | 0 | 0 |
| | Dominic Waldouck | (England) | CE | 12 June | 1 | 3 | 0 | 0 | 0 | 15 |

== Staff ==
- Head coach: Paule Barford
- Assistant coach: Paul Holmes
- Assistant coach: Eamonn Hogan

== Transfers ==
Joined
| Player | Position | Former team | Ref |
|---|---|---|---|
| Cameron Falcon | Hooker | (United States) New Orleans | |
| Dylan Fawsitt | Hooker | (United States) Life University | |
| Chris Schade | Hooker | (United States) Columbus | |
| Demecus Beach | Prop | (United States) Life University | |
| Jamie Mackintosh | Prop | (France) Montpellier | |
| Angus MacLellan | Prop | (United States) Chicago Lions | |
| Anthony Parry | Prop | (United States) Columbus | |
| Kyle Baillie | Lock | (Canada) Atlantic Rock | |
| Pierce Dargan | Lock | (Ireland) Clontarf | |
| Ryan McTiernan | Lock | (United States) New York Athletic Club | |
| Spike Davis | Flanker | (United States) Columbus | |
| Filippo Ferrarini | Flanker | (Italy) Zebre | |
| Chad Joseph | Flanker | (United States) Dallas | |
| Peter Malcolm | Flanker | (United States) Wheeling Jesuit University | |
| Sebastián Kalm | Number 8 | (United States) Lindenwood | |
| Dominic Pezzutti | Number 8 | (United States) Columbus | |
| Shaun Davies | Scrum-half | (United States) Life University | |
| Robbie Shaw | Scrum-half | (England) Hartpury College | |
| JP Eloff | Fly-half | (United States) Chicago Lions | |
| Taylor Howden | Fly-half | (United States) Columbus | |
| Chris Kunkel | Fly-half | (England) Richmond | |
| Matt Hughston | Centre | (United States) Charlotte | |
| Zach Stryffeler | Centre | (United States) Columbus | |
| Roland Suniula | Centre | (France) Chalon | |
| Dominic Waldouck | Centre | (England) London Irish | |
| Mason Baum | Wing | (United States) Davenport University | |
| Alex Elkins | Wing | (United States) Columbus | |
| Ahmad Harajly | Wing | (United States) Detroit Tradesmen | |
| Shawn Riley | Wing | (United States) Notre Dame College | |
| Allan Hanson | Fullback | (United States) Wheeling Jesuit University | |
| Zac Mizell | Fullback | (United States) Austin Blacks | |
| Paule Barford | Head coach | (United States) Cornell University | |
