= 2016 Denver Stampede season =

Denver Stampede
- Location: Denver, Colorado, U.S.
- Ground: CIBER Field (Capacity: 1,915)
- Coach: Sean O'Leary
- Captain: Pedrie Wannenburg
- Top scorer: Will Magie (53)
- League: PRO Rugby
- 2016: 1st
1st kit	2nd kit

The 2016 Denver Stampede season was the first and only season in the club's history. Coached by Sean O'Leary and captained by Pedrie Wannenburg, Denver competed in the United States' 2016 PRO Rugby competition which they won.

== Jersey and sponsors ==
In 2016 Denver jerseys were made by Champion System.

== Fixtures ==
All home matches were played at Infinity Park in Denver through May and then at the University of Denver's CIBER Field.

Date	Week	Opponent	Venue	Result	Score	Tries	Goals	Attendance	Report
17 April	1	Ohio	Infinity Park, Glendale, Colorado	Win	16–13	Al-Jiboori, Wallace	Kruger, Magie	2,312	
24 April	2	San Francisco	Boxer Stadium, San Francisco	Win	18-35	Wannenburg,Collins(2),Malifa,Fenoglio	Magie(4)	1,700	2
1 May	3	San Diego Breakers	Torero Stadium, San Diego	Win	16-22	Fenoglio, Wannenburg,London	Magie(3)	2,000	
	4	Bye							
15 May	5	Sacramento	Bonney Field, Sacramento	Win	13-35	De Achaval(2),Germishuys(2), Kruger	Magie(4)	2,000	
20 May	6	San Francisco Rush	Infinity Park, Glendale, Colorado	Win	41-37	Fenoglio,White,Rock,London(2),Wiessing	Magie(5)	2,346	
	7	Bye							
5 June	8	San Diego	Torero Stadium, San Diego	Win	24–23				
	9	Bye							
19 June	10	Ohio	CIBER Field, Denver	Loss	27–48				
26 June	11	Sacramento	CIBER Field, Denver	Win	29–13				
	12	Bye							
10 July	13	San Diego	CIBER Field, Denver						
17 July	14	Sacramento	CIBER Field, Denver						
24 July	15	San Francisco	Boxer Stadium, San Francisco						
31 July	16	Ohio	Memorial Park, Obetz						

== Ladder ==
2016 PRO Rugby season
Pos	Team	Pld	W	D	L	PF	PA	PD	B	Pts
1	Denver Stampede	12	10	0	2	403	273	+130	8	48
2	Ohio Aviators	12	9	0	3	476	273	+203	11	47
3	San Diego Breakers	12	4	0	8	335	413	−78	9	25
4	San Francisco Rush	12	4	0	8	339	454	−115	8	24
5	Sacramento Express	12	3	0	9	294	434	−140	6	18

=== Ladder progression ===
2016 PRO Rugby season
Team	W1	W2	W3	W4	W5	W6	W7	W8	W9	W10	W11	W12	W13	W14	W15	W16
Denver Stampede	4 (2nd)	9 (1st)	13 (1st)	13 (1st)	18 (1st)	23 (1st)	23 (1st)	27 (1st)	27 (1st)	27 (2nd)	31 (2nd)	31 (2nd)	36 (2nd)	41 (2nd)	46 (1st)	48 (1st)
Ohio Aviators	1 (3rd)	1 (4th)	6 (2nd)	11 (2nd)	12 (3rd)	17 (2nd)	17 (3rd)	17 (3rd)	22 (2nd)	27 (1st)	32 (1st)	37 (1st)	42 (1st)	42 (1st)	42 (2nd)	47 (2nd)
Sacramento Express	5 (1st)	5 (3rd)	5 (4th)	5 (4th)	5 (4th)	5 (4th)	5 (5th)	5 (5th)	5 (5th)	5 (5th)	5 (5th)	10 (5th)	11 (5th)	11 (5th)	16 (5th)	18 (5th)
San Diego Breakers	0 (4th)	5 (2nd)	6 (3rd)	11 (3rd)	15 (2nd)	15 (3rd)	20 (2nd)	21 (2nd)	22 (3rd)	23 (3rd)	23 (3rd)	23 (3rd)	23 (3rd)	24 (3rd)	25 (3rd)	25 (3rd)
San Francisco Rush	0 (5th)	0 (5th)	0 (5th)	1 (5th)	1 (5th)	3 (5th)	8 (4th)	8 (4th)	8 (4th)	12 (4th)	12 (4th)	12 (4th)	12 (4th)	17 (4th)	19 (4th)	24 (4th)
The table above shows a team's progression throughout the season. For each round, their cumulative points total is shown with the overall log position in brackets.
Key:	win	loss	draw	bye												

== Squad ==
No.	Name	Nationality	Position	Denver Debut	App	T	C	P	DG	Pts
1	Luke White	(Australia)	PR	17 April 2016	4	0	0	0	0	0
2	Zach Fenoglio	(United States)	HK	17 April 2016	3	2	0	0	0	10
3	Ben Tarr	(United States)	PR	17 April 2016	4	0	0	0	0	0
4	Brodie Orth	(United States)	LK	17 April 2016	2	0	0	0	0	0
5	Christian Wiessing	(United States)	LK	17 April 2016	4	0	0	0	0	0
6	Logan Collins	(United States)	FL	17 April 2016	4	2	0	0	0	10
7	Peter Dahl	(United States)	FL	17 April 2016	3	0	0	0	0	0
8	Pedrie Wannenburg	(South Africa)	N8	17 April 2016	4	1	0	0	0	5
9	Niku Kruger	(United States)	SH	17 April 2016	4	2	0	1	0	13
10	Ata Malifa	(United States)	FH	17 April 2016	4	0	0	0	0	0
11	Michael Al-Jiboori	(United States)	WG	17 April 2016	3	1	0	0	0	5
12	Michael Garrity	(United States)	CE	17 April 2016	4	0	0	0	0	0
13	Chad London	(United States)	CE	17 April 2016	4	1	0	0	0	5
14	Martin Knoetze	(South Africa)	WG	17 April 2016	2	0	0	0	0	0
15	Will Magie	(United States)	FH	17 April 2016	4	0	6	6	0	30
16	Nicholas Wallace	(United States)	PR	17 April 2016	4	1	0	0	0	5
17	Jake Turnbull	(Australia)	PR	17 April 2016	4	0	0	0	0	0
18	Soane Leger	(Tonga)	PR	17 April 2016	3	0	0	0	0	0
19	Gannon Moore	(United States)	FL	17 April 2016	4	0	0	0	0	0
20	Zac Pauga	(United States)	N8	17 April 2016	1	0	0	0	0	0
21	Bobby Impson	(United States)	SH	17 April 2016	4	0	0	0	0	0
22	Maximo de Achaval	(Argentina)	FB	17 April 2016	4	2	0	0	0	10
23	Dustin Croy	(United States)	FB	17 April 2016	2	0	0	0	0	0
26	Chris Baumann	(United States)	HK	1 May 2016	2	0	0	0	0	0
27	Hanco Germishuys	(United States)	FL	15 May 2016	1	2	0	0	0	10
	Ben Landry	(United States)	LK		0	0	0	0	0	0
	Justin Pauga	(United States)	CE		0	0	0	0	0	0
	Armandt Peens	(South Africa)	FH		0	0	0	0	0	0
24	Timana Tahu	(Australia)	WG	24 April 2016	3	0	0	0	0	0
25	Mose Timoteo	(United States)	SH	24 April 2016	2	0	0	0	0	0

== Staff ==
- Head coach: Sean O'Leary
- Assistant coach: Peter Borlase
- Assistant coach: David Williams
- Technical advisor: André Snyman

== Transfers ==
Joined
Player	Position	Former team	Ref
Chris Baumann	Hooker	(United States) Austin Blacks	
Zach Fenoglio	Hooker	(United States) Glendale Raptors	
Soane Leger	Prop	(United States) Denver Barbarians	
Ben Tarr	Prop	(Australia) Souths	
Jake Turnbull	Prop	(Australia) Eastern Suburbs	
Nicholas Wallace	Prop	(United States) Glendale Raptors	
Luke White	Prop	(United States) Glendale Raptors	
Ben Landry	Lock	(United States) Seattle Saracens	
Brodie Orth	Lock	(United States) Kansas City Blues	
Christian Wiessing	Lock	(United States) Glendale Raptors	
Logan Collins	Flanker	(United States) Denver Barbarians	
Peter Dahl	Flanker	(United States) Belmont Shore	
Hanco Germishuys	Flanker	(United States) Glendale Raptors	
Gannon Moore	Flanker	(United States) Kansas City Blues	
Zac Pauga	Number 8	(United States) Glendale Raptors	
Pedrie Wannenburg	Number 8	(France) Oyonnax	
Bobby Impson	Scrum-half	(United States) Denver Barbarians	
Niku Kruger	Scrum-half	(United States) Glendale Raptors	
Mose Timoteo	Scrum-half	(United States) SFGG	
Will Magie	Fly-half	(England) Barnes	
Ata Malifa	Fly-half	(United States) Denver Barbarians	
Armandt Peens	Fly-half	(United States) Glendale Raptors	
Michael Al-Jiboori	Centre	(United States) Denver Barbarians	
Michael Garrity	Centre	(United States) Seattle Saracens	
Chad London	Centre	(United States) Glendale Raptors	
Justin Pauga	Centre	(United States) Denver Barbarians	
Martin Knoetze	Wing	(United States) Glendale Raptors	
Timana Tahu	Wing	(Australia) Newcastle Knights (RL)	
Dustin Croy	Fullback	(United States) Glendale Raptors	
Maximo de Achaval	Fullback	(United States) Denver Barbarians	
Sean O'Leary	Head coach	(United States) Notre Dame	
