= 2016 Sacramento Express season =

Sacramento Express
- Founded: 2016
- Location: Sacramento, California
- Ground: Bonney Field (Capacity: 11,442)
- Coach: Luke Gross
- Captain: John Quill
- Top scorer: Mirco Bergamasco (66)
- League: PRO Rugby
1st kit	2nd kit

The 2016 Sacramento Express season was the inaugural season of the Sacramento Express.

The Express played their inaugural game on April 17, defeating the San Francisco Rush 37–25.

== 2016 season ==
Week	Date	Opponent	Result	Record	Game site
1	April 17	San Francisco Rush	W 37-25	1-0	Bonney Field
2	April 23	at San Diego Breakers	L 24-37	1-1	Torero Stadium
3	Bye				
4	May 8	Ohio Aviators	L 11-31	1-2	Bonney Field
5	May 15	Denver Stampede	L 13-35	1-3	Bonney Field
6	May 22	at Ohio Aviators	L 17-50	1-4	EAS Training Center
7	May 29	at San Diego Breakers	L 44-23	1-5	Torero Stadium
8	Bye				
9	Bye				
10	Bye				
11	June 26	at Denver Stampede	L 13–29	1–6	CIBER Field
12	July 3	at San Francisco Rush			Boxer Stadium
13	July 9	Ohio Aviators			Bonney Field
14	July 17	at Denver Stampede			CIBER Field
15	July 23	San Diego Breakers			Bonney Field
16	July 30	San Francisco Rush			Bonney Field

== Ladder ==
2016 PRO Rugby season
Pos	Team	Pld	W	D	L	PF	PA	PD	B	Pts
1	Denver Stampede	12	10	0	2	403	273	+130	8	48
2	Ohio Aviators	12	9	0	3	476	273	+203	11	47
3	San Diego Breakers	12	4	0	8	335	413	−78	9	25
4	San Francisco Rush	12	4	0	8	339	454	−115	8	24
5	Sacramento Express	12	3	0	9	294	434	−140	6	18

=== Ladder progression ===
2016 PRO Rugby season
Team	W1	W2	W3	W4	W5	W6	W7	W8	W9	W10	W11	W12	W13	W14	W15	W16
Denver Stampede	4 (2nd)	9 (1st)	13 (1st)	13 (1st)	18 (1st)	23 (1st)	23 (1st)	27 (1st)	27 (1st)	27 (2nd)	31 (2nd)	31 (2nd)	36 (2nd)	41 (2nd)	46 (1st)	48 (1st)
Ohio Aviators	1 (3rd)	1 (4th)	6 (2nd)	11 (2nd)	12 (3rd)	17 (2nd)	17 (3rd)	17 (3rd)	22 (2nd)	27 (1st)	32 (1st)	37 (1st)	42 (1st)	42 (1st)	42 (2nd)	47 (2nd)
Sacramento Express	5 (1st)	5 (3rd)	5 (4th)	5 (4th)	5 (4th)	5 (4th)	5 (5th)	5 (5th)	5 (5th)	5 (5th)	5 (5th)	10 (5th)	11 (5th)	11 (5th)	16 (5th)	18 (5th)
San Diego Breakers	0 (4th)	5 (2nd)	6 (3rd)	11 (3rd)	15 (2nd)	15 (3rd)	20 (2nd)	21 (2nd)	22 (3rd)	23 (3rd)	23 (3rd)	23 (3rd)	23 (3rd)	24 (3rd)	25 (3rd)	25 (3rd)
San Francisco Rush	0 (5th)	0 (5th)	0 (5th)	1 (5th)	1 (5th)	3 (5th)	8 (4th)	8 (4th)	8 (4th)	12 (4th)	12 (4th)	12 (4th)	12 (4th)	17 (4th)	19 (4th)	24 (4th)
The table above shows a team's progression throughout the season. For each round, their cumulative points total is shown with the overall log position in brackets.
Key:	win	loss	draw	bye												
