= 2016 San Diego Breakers season =

The 2016 season is the inaugural season of the San Diego Breakers. They played their home games at Torero Stadium.

They beat the Sacramento Express, 37–24, in their inaugural game.

== 2016 season ==
Week	Date	Opponent	Result	Record	Game site
1	Bye				
2	April 23	Sacramento Express	W 37–24	1-0	Torero Stadium
3	May 1	Denver Stampede	L 16–22	1-1	Torero Stadium
4	May 8	at San Francisco Rush	W 46–33	2-1	Boxer Stadium
5	May 15	Ohio Aviators	W 24–20	3-1	Torero Stadium
6	Bye				
7	May 29	Sacramento Express	W 44–23	4-1	Torero Stadium
8	June 5	Denver Stampede	L 23–24	4-2	Torero Stadium
9	June 12	at Ohio Aviators	L 31–55	4-3	EAS Training Center
10	June 18	San Francisco Rush	L 19–24	4-4	Torero Stadium
11	Bye				
12	July 3	at Ohio Aviators			EAS Training Center
13	July 10	at Denver Stampede			CIBER Field
14	July 17	at San Francisco Rush			Boxer Stadium
15	July 23	at Sacramento Express			Bonney Field
16	Bye				

== Ladder ==
2016 PRO Rugby season
Pos	Team	Pld	W	D	L	PF	PA	PD	B	Pts
1	Denver Stampede	12	10	0	2	403	273	+130	8	48
2	Ohio Aviators	12	9	0	3	476	273	+203	11	47
3	San Diego Breakers	12	4	0	8	335	413	−78	9	25
4	San Francisco Rush	12	4	0	8	339	454	−115	8	24
5	Sacramento Express	12	3	0	9	294	434	−140	6	18

=== Ladder progression ===
2016 PRO Rugby season
Team	W1	W2	W3	W4	W5	W6	W7	W8	W9	W10	W11	W12	W13	W14	W15	W16
Denver Stampede	4 (2nd)	9 (1st)	13 (1st)	13 (1st)	18 (1st)	23 (1st)	23 (1st)	27 (1st)	27 (1st)	27 (2nd)	31 (2nd)	31 (2nd)	36 (2nd)	41 (2nd)	46 (1st)	48 (1st)
Ohio Aviators	1 (3rd)	1 (4th)	6 (2nd)	11 (2nd)	12 (3rd)	17 (2nd)	17 (3rd)	17 (3rd)	22 (2nd)	27 (1st)	32 (1st)	37 (1st)	42 (1st)	42 (1st)	42 (2nd)	47 (2nd)
Sacramento Express	5 (1st)	5 (3rd)	5 (4th)	5 (4th)	5 (4th)	5 (4th)	5 (5th)	5 (5th)	5 (5th)	5 (5th)	5 (5th)	10 (5th)	11 (5th)	11 (5th)	16 (5th)	18 (5th)
San Diego Breakers	0 (4th)	5 (2nd)	6 (3rd)	11 (3rd)	15 (2nd)	15 (3rd)	20 (2nd)	21 (2nd)	22 (3rd)	23 (3rd)	23 (3rd)	23 (3rd)	23 (3rd)	24 (3rd)	25 (3rd)	25 (3rd)
San Francisco Rush	0 (5th)	0 (5th)	0 (5th)	1 (5th)	1 (5th)	3 (5th)	8 (4th)	8 (4th)	8 (4th)	12 (4th)	12 (4th)	12 (4th)	12 (4th)	17 (4th)	19 (4th)	24 (4th)
The table above shows a team's progression throughout the season. For each round, their cumulative points total is shown with the overall log position in brackets.
Key:	win	loss	draw	bye												
