= 2016 San Francisco Rush season =

The 2016 San Francisco season was the inaugural season of San Francisco Rush.

The Rush played their inaugural game on April 17, suffering a 25–37 defeat to the Sacramento Express.

== 2016 season ==
Week	Date	Opponent	Result	Record	Game site
1	April 17	at Sacramento Express	L 25-37	0-1	Bonney Field
2	April 24	Denver Stampede	L 18-35	0-2	Boxer Stadium
3	May 1	Ohio Aviators	L 17-51	0-3	EAS Training Center
4	May 8	San Diego Breakers	L 46-33	0-4	Boxer Stadium
5	Bye				
6	May 20	Denver Stampede	L 41-37	0-5	Infinity Park
7	May 29	Ohio Aviators	W 35-20	1-5	Boxer Stadium
8	Bye				
9	Bye				
10	June 18	at San Diego Breakers	W 19-24	2-5	Torero Stadium
11	June 26	at Ohio Aviators	L 20–71	2–6	EAS Training Center
12	July 3	Sacramento Express	L 19-43	2-7	Boxer Stadium
13	Bye				
14	July 16	San Diego Breakers	W 50-26	3-7	Boxer Stadium
15	July 23	Denver Stampede	L 24-31	3-8	Boxer Stadium
16	July 23	at Sacramento Express			Bonney Field

== Ladder ==
2016 PRO Rugby season
Pos	Team	Pld	W	D	L	PF	PA	PD	B	Pts
1	Denver Stampede	12	10	0	2	403	273	+130	8	48
2	Ohio Aviators	12	9	0	3	476	273	+203	11	47
3	San Diego Breakers	12	4	0	8	335	413	−78	9	25
4	San Francisco Rush	12	4	0	8	339	454	−115	8	24
5	Sacramento Express	12	3	0	9	294	434	−140	6	18

=== Ladder progression ===
2016 PRO Rugby season
Team	W1	W2	W3	W4	W5	W6	W7	W8	W9	W10	W11	W12	W13	W14	W15	W16
Denver Stampede	4 (2nd)	9 (1st)	13 (1st)	13 (1st)	18 (1st)	23 (1st)	23 (1st)	27 (1st)	27 (1st)	27 (2nd)	31 (2nd)	31 (2nd)	36 (2nd)	41 (2nd)	46 (1st)	48 (1st)
Ohio Aviators	1 (3rd)	1 (4th)	6 (2nd)	11 (2nd)	12 (3rd)	17 (2nd)	17 (3rd)	17 (3rd)	22 (2nd)	27 (1st)	32 (1st)	37 (1st)	42 (1st)	42 (1st)	42 (2nd)	47 (2nd)
Sacramento Express	5 (1st)	5 (3rd)	5 (4th)	5 (4th)	5 (4th)	5 (4th)	5 (5th)	5 (5th)	5 (5th)	5 (5th)	5 (5th)	10 (5th)	11 (5th)	11 (5th)	16 (5th)	18 (5th)
San Diego Breakers	0 (4th)	5 (2nd)	6 (3rd)	11 (3rd)	15 (2nd)	15 (3rd)	20 (2nd)	21 (2nd)	22 (3rd)	23 (3rd)	23 (3rd)	23 (3rd)	23 (3rd)	24 (3rd)	25 (3rd)	25 (3rd)
San Francisco Rush	0 (5th)	0 (5th)	0 (5th)	1 (5th)	1 (5th)	3 (5th)	8 (4th)	8 (4th)	8 (4th)	12 (4th)	12 (4th)	12 (4th)	12 (4th)	17 (4th)	19 (4th)	24 (4th)
The table above shows a team's progression throughout the season. For each round, their cumulative points total is shown with the overall log position in brackets.
Key:	win	loss	draw	bye												
