= Dominic Waldouck =

English rugby union player

- Full name: Dominic James Martin Waldouck
- Born: 26 September 1987 (age 39) Hammersmith, London, England
- Height: 1.81 m (5 ft 11 in)
- Weight: 95 kg (14 st 13 lb)
- School: Latymer Upper School
- University: Open University, Oxford University

Rugby union career
- Position: Centre
Senior career
Years	Team	Apps	(Points)
2006–2012	London Wasps	114	(85)
2012–2015	Northampton Saints	47	(5)
2015–2016	London Irish	6	(5)
2016	Ohio Aviators	6	(25)
2016–2020	Newcastle Falcons	25	(10)
- Correct as of 19 May 2019
International career
Years	Team	Apps	(Points)
2005–2006	England U20		
2009–2011	England Saxons	7	(5)
2010	England XV	2	(0)
National sevens team
Years	Team		Comps
2006–2007	England		3
Coaching career
- Years: Team
- 2020–: Gloucester (Defence Coach)

Dominic Waldouck (born 26 September 1987) is an English rugby union coach and former player. His playing position was centre.

== Early life and education ==
Waldouck grew up in Shepherd's Bush, London. He attended Kew College Primary School. He then studied at Latymer Upper School in Hammersmith, London, gaining A grades in three A levels – Philosophy, English and History of Art. In 2015 he gained a BA in politics, philosophy and economics at the Open University. In 2019 he gained a Masters at Oxford University.

As well as his rugby talent, Waldouck was also a member of the Fulham Soccer Academy and played cricket for South-East England U16s.

== Rugby career ==
=== Playing career ===
==== Club career ====
Waldouck joined the London Wasps Academy in 2003/4 and followed it with an international debut for England U16 later that season, celebrating his first cap by scoring a try against Italy. He made his way into the London Wasps A team in 2004/05, and consolidated that with seven A team appearances in 2005/06, scoring one try and two conversions. Waldouck earned a full-time professional contract with London Wasps, making his senior debut against London Irish in the EDF Energy Cup in October 2006. In May 2007, Waldouck came off the bench to earn a Heineken Cup winner's medal when London Wasps beat Leicester Tigers 25–9 at Twickenham. The following season he started as Wasps won the 2007–08 Premiership Final. He was named a vice-captain of London Wasps for 2010/2011 though a ruptured Achilles tendon brought a premature end to his involvement that season. Waldouck made 15 appearances for Wasps in the 2011/2012 campaign - taking his career total for the club above 100.

In July 2012 Waldouck switched clubs for the first time in his career, leaving London Wasps where he had spent nine years, to join the Northampton Saints after the two clubs agreed terms for his early release.

Waldouck joined London Irish at the start of the 2015–16 season.

On 8 April 2016 it was announced that Waldouck would leave London Irish for the United States and join the Ohio Aviators in the newly formed PRO Rugby. Ohio played their inaugural game on 17 April 2016 when they travelled to Infinity Park to face Denver Stampede. Waldouck made his Aviators debut on 12 June 2016 and scored a hat-trick of tries at home against the San Diego Breakers.

On 14 July 2016, it was announced that Waldouck had signed with English side Newcastle Falcons on a one-month trial that would see him join the club for their pre-season friendlies. He later signed a full-time contract.

Waldouck captained Oxford University’s Rugby side in 2018 while studying for an MSc in Sustainable Urban Development at Kellogg College.

Waldouck returned to Newcastle in 2019.

==== International ====
Waldouck was called up to the senior England squad for the 2008 tour of New Zealand.

In 2009, Waldouck started all four England Saxons matches, scoring a try on his debut against Portugal. He also played in the 2010 Saxons victory over Ireland.

A run of 17 Premiership appearances during the 2009/2010 season led to Waldouck's promotion to the Senior Elite Player Squad and subsequent selection for the summer tour of Australia and New Zealand. Having caught the eye in the first half of the midweek game against the Australian Barbarians in Gosford, a first Test appearance seemed sure to follow but a twisted ankle ended his involvement in the tour.

=== Coaching career ===
In July 2019 Waldouck signed a player/coach contract with Newcastle. As well as remaining a first team squad player, his main coaching focus was backs defence.

In July 2020 Waldouck signed as Defence Coach for Gloucester.
