= Sports in Colorado =

Coordinates: 38.9972°N 105.5478°W

The location of the State of Colorado in the United States of America.

This list of sports in the U.S. State of Colorado includes professional teams, college sports, and individual sports from the Denver Metropolitan Area and other cities.

== Professional sports teams ==
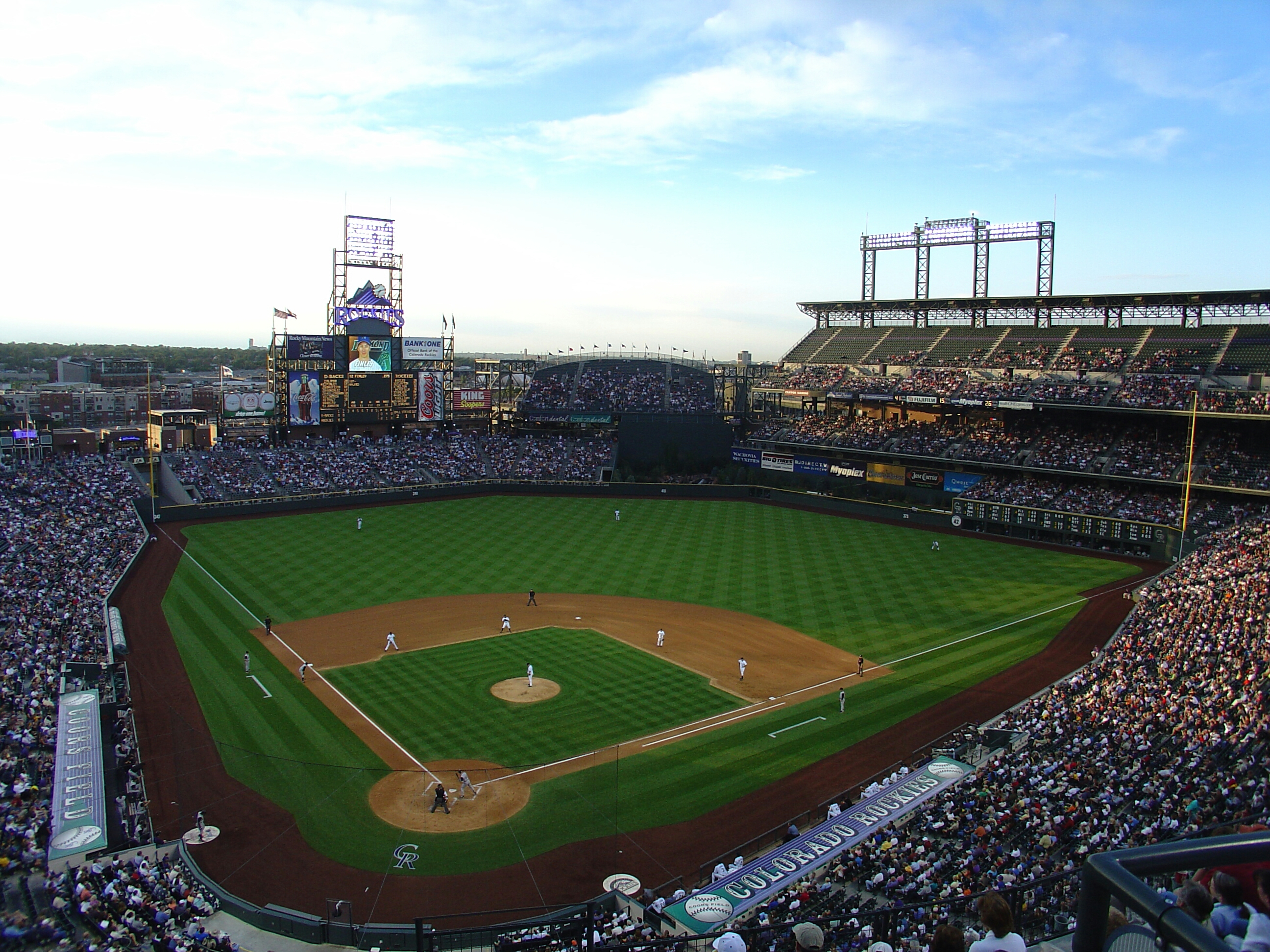
Coors Field, home of the Colorado Rockies.

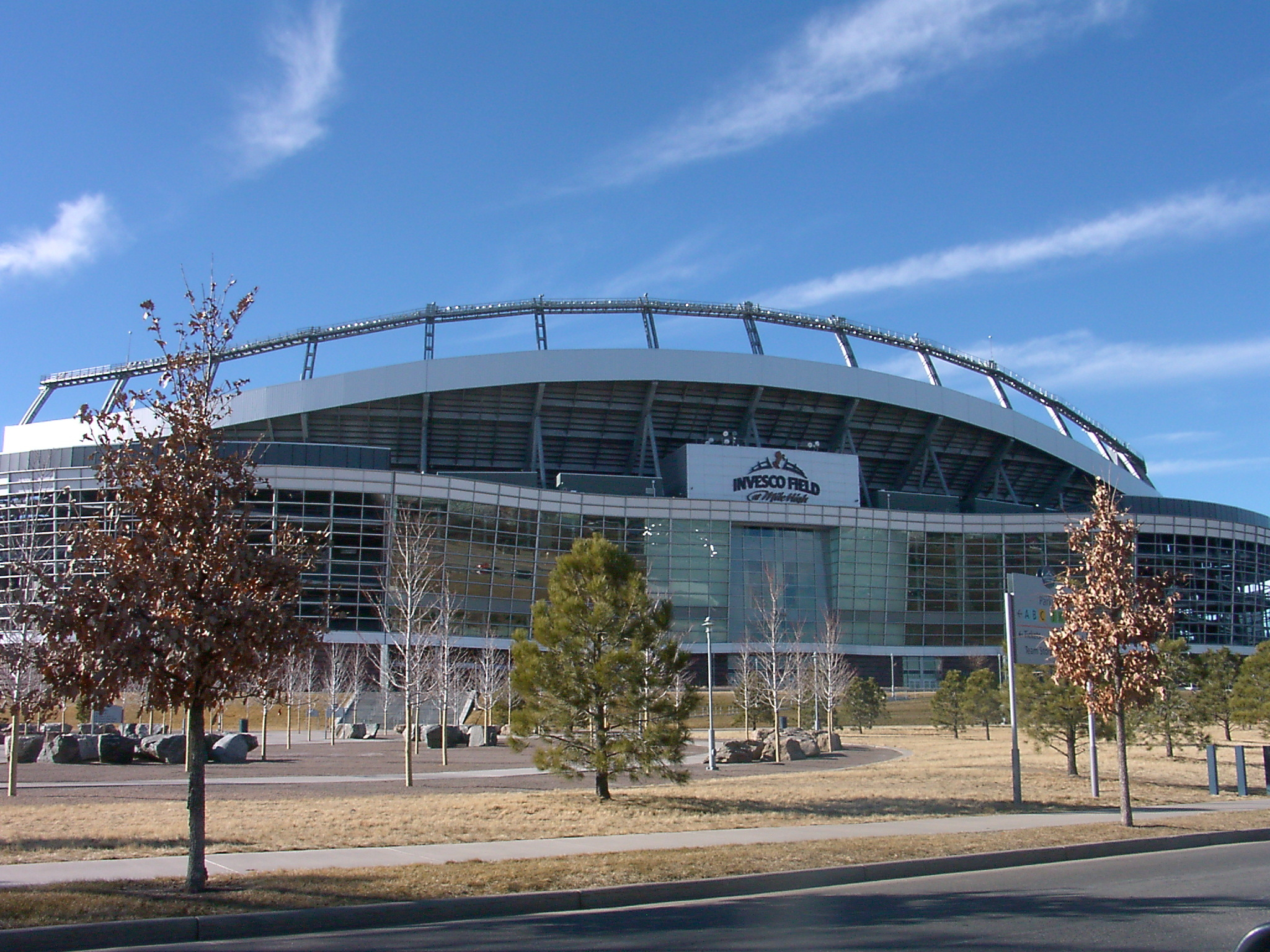
Empower Field at Mile High, home of the Denver Broncos.

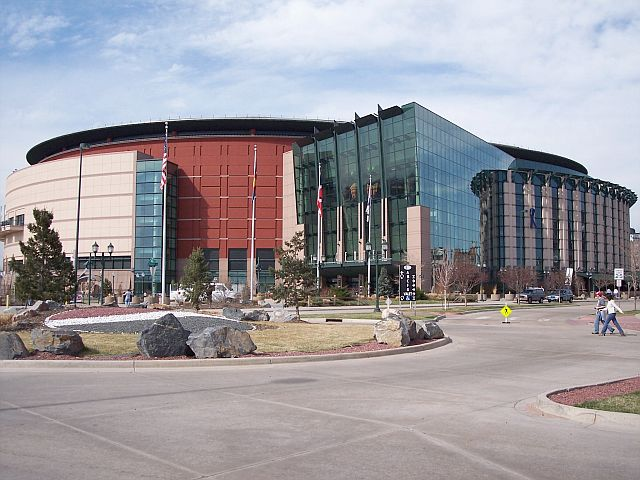
Ball Arena, home of the Denver Nuggets, the Colorado Avalanche, and the Colorado Mammoth.

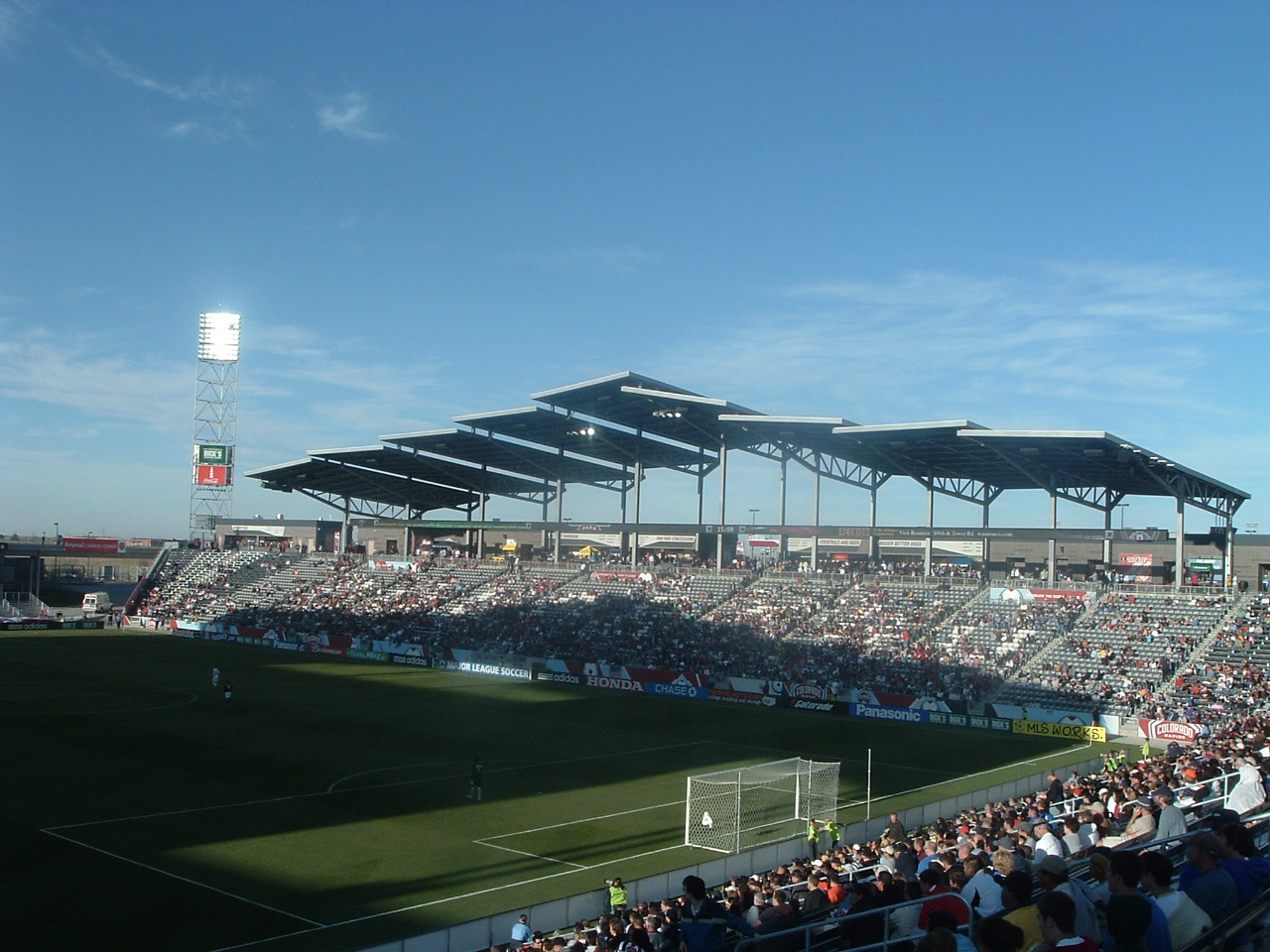
Dick's Sporting Goods Park, home of the Colorado Rapids.

Colorado is the least populous state with a franchise in each of the major professional sports leagues. The state is able to support the teams because it contains a large metropolitan area with a higher population than any other city within 550 miles (885 km). Therefore, many of the residents in the surrounding states support the teams in Denver, as shown by the reach of the Broncos' radio network.

Club	Home	First game	Sport	League
Denver Broncos	Denver	September 9, 1960	Football	National Football League
Denver Nuggets	Denver	September 27, 1967	Basketball	National Basketball Association
Colorado Rockies	Denver	April 5, 1993	Baseball	Major League Baseball
Colorado Avalanche	Denver	October 6, 1995	Ice hockey	National Hockey League
Colorado Rapids	Commerce City	April 13, 1996	Soccer	Major League Soccer
Denver Summit FC	Denver	March 14, 2026	Soccer	National Women's Soccer League
Denver Outlaws	Denver	June 2, 2024	Field lacrosse	Premier Lacrosse League
Colorado Springs Switchbacks FC	Colorado Springs	March 28, 2015	Soccer	USL Championship
Denver Bulldogs	Denver	Summer 1998	Australian rules football	USAFL
Colorado Mammoth	Denver	January 3, 2003	Lacrosse	National Lacrosse League
Colorado Eagles	Loveland	October 17, 2003	Ice hockey	American Hockey League
Rocky Mountain Rollergirls	Denver	July 2005	Roller derby	Women's Flat Track Derby Association
Denver Roller Derby	Denver	December 2007	Roller derby	Women's Flat Track Derby Association
Boulder County Bombers	Boulder	November 2011	Roller derby	Women's Flat Track Derby Association
Denver Barbarians	Denver	Spring 1967	Rugby union	Rugby Super League
American Raptors	Glendale	Spring 2007	Rugby union	Super Rugby Americas

=== Former professional sports teams ===
Club	Sport	League
Aurora Cavalry	Basketball	International Basketball League
Colorado 14ers (won championship in their final season of 2008–09; moved to Frisco, Texas, went on hiatus in 2009–10, and resumed play in 2010–11 as the Texas Legends)	Basketball	NBA Development League (Note: Now known as the NBA G League.)
Colorado Chill (folded along with the NWBL)	Basketball	National Women's Basketball League
Colorado Crossover	Basketball	International Basketball League
Colorado Crush (suspended operations with the AFL in 2009, and did not return after league's hiatus ended)	Arena football	Arena Football League
Colorado Rapids U23's	Soccer	USL Premier Development League
Colorado Raptors (Reformed as American Raptors, playing in Super Rugby Americas)	Rugby union	Major League Rugby
Colorado Rockies (NHL) (moved to East Rutherford, New Jersey, and became the New Jersey Devils)	Ice hockey	National Hockey League
Colorado Rumble FC (Denver)	Indoor soccer	Major Arena Soccer League 2
Colorado Springs Blizzard	Soccer	USL Premier Development League
Colorado Springs Sky Sox (relocated to San Antonio after the 2018 season as the San Antonio Missions)	Baseball	Pacific Coast League (Triple-A, Minor League Baseball)
Colorado Springs Snow Sox	Baseball	Pecos League
Colorado Xplosion (won the Western Conference Championship in inaugural season)	Women's Basketball	American Basketball League (1996–1998)
Denver Grizzlies (moved to Salt Lake City, Utah, later moved to Cleveland, Ohio, and became the Lake Erie/Cleveland Monsters)	Ice hockey	International Hockey League (1945–2001)
Denver Spurs (moved to Ottawa, Ontario and became the Ottawa Civics for the rest of the team's existence)	Ice hockey	World Hockey Association/Central Hockey League/Western Hockey League
Denver Cutthroats	Ice hockey	Central Hockey League
Denver Dynamite (Inaugural AFL member; folded after four seasons)	Arena football	Arena Football League
Denver Gold (United States Football League member, 1983–1985)	Football	United States Football League
Denver Bears/Denver Zephyrs (moved to New Orleans and became the New Orleans Zephyrs; now playing as the New Orleans Baby Cakes in the New Orleans suburb of Metairie, Louisiana)	Baseball	American Association/Pacific Coast League
Denver Racquets 1974 Champions (moved to Phoenix 1975)	Tennis	World Team Tennis
Denver Stampede	Rugby union	PRO Rugby
Grand Junction Jackalopes (in 2025, announced they would be relocating but have yet to reveal a new location)	Baseball	Pioneer League (Independent, MLB Partner League)
Northern Colorado Owlz	Baseball	Pioneer League (Independent, MLB Partner League)
Rocky Mountain Rage	Ice hockey	Central Hockey League
Rocky Mountain Vibes	Baseball	Pioneer League (Independent, MLB Partner League)

== College athletics ==
Colorado is home to five NCAA Division I schools, plus a number of additional schools competing at lower levels. One school that competes at the lowest NCAA level, Division III, operates two Division I teams.

Team	School	City	Conference
Air Force Falcons	United States Air Force Academy	USAF Academy (Note: The Academy lies to the north of the Colorado Springs city limits; it is respectively designated by the US Census Bureau and US Postal Service as "Air Force Academy, Colorado" and "USAF Academy, Colorado".)	Mountain West (Note: Many Falcons teams compete outside the MW in sports that conference does not sponsor. Notably, the men's ice hockey team plays in Atlantic Hockey America, the men's lacrosse team in the Atlantic Sun Conference, and the men's wrestling team in the Big 12 Conference.)
Colorado Buffaloes	University of Colorado Boulder	Boulder	Big 12
Colorado College Tigers (Note: Colorado College is a member of the Division III Southern Collegiate Athletic Conference in most sports, but fields Division I teams in men's ice hockey and women's soccer. It is one of a small number of Division III schools allowed to award athletic scholarships in its Division I sports.)	Colorado College	Colorado Springs	NCHC (men's ice hockey); Mountain West (women's soccer)
Colorado State Rams	Colorado State University	Fort Collins	Mountain West (Pac-12 in July 2026)
Denver Pioneers	University of Denver	Denver	Summit (Note: Four high-profile DU teams compete as members of other conferences in sports that are not sponsored by either DU's current home of the Summit League or its future home of the West Coast Conference. The men's ice hockey team plays in the National Collegiate Hockey Conference, the men's and women's lacrosse teams play in the Big East Conference, and the women's gymnastics team competes in the Big 12 Conference.) (WCC in July 2026)
Northern Colorado Bears	University of Northern Colorado	Greeley	Big Sky (Note: The baseball and men's golf teams compete in the Summit League, and the men's wrestling team competes in the Big 12 Conference.)

== Other sports ==
The Unser family includes Al Unser, Al Unser Jr., Bobby Unser, Robby Unser and Louis Unser, and have won the Indianapolis 500 among other motorsports events.

The Pikes Peak International Hill Climb is a major motorsports event held at the Pikes Peak roads. Notable drivers include Mario Andretti, Michèle Mouton, Walter Röhrl, Ari Vatanen, Nobuhiro Tajima, Stig Blomqvist, Sébastien Loeb and Romain Dumas in addition to the Unsers.

Meanwhile, the Pikes Peak International Raceway has hosted motorsport events including IndyCar Series, NASCAR Busch Series, NASCAR Truck Series, AMA Superbike Championship and USAC Silver Crown Series.

The Cherry Hills Country Club has hosted professional golf tournaments such as the U.S. Open, U.S. Senior Open, U.S. Women's Open and PGA Championship.

The U.S. Army World Class Athlete Program (WCAP) is located at Fort Carson and serves as the training system for active duty, National Guard and Reserve soldiers to compete for Team USA at the Olympic and the Paralympic Games. Similarly, the Air Force World Class Athlete Program operates in Colorado Springs near one of two locations for the United States Olympic Training Center.

Since 2002, Aspen has served as the host city for ESPN's annual Winter X Games competitions.

== See also ==
- Colorado Sports Hall of Fame
- Sports in Denver
- Bibliography of Colorado
- Geography of Colorado
- History of Colorado
- Index of Colorado-related articles
- List of Colorado-related lists
- Outline of Colorado
