= Sports in Denver =

Overview of sports traditions and activities in Denver, Colorado, United States

Coordinates: 39.7392°N 104.9850°W

Location of Denver in the United States

Denver is home to many professional sports teams who are based out of Denver and surrounding cities in the metropolitan area. It is also one of the twelve American cities to house a team from each of the four major league sports. All four of its teams play their home games near downtown with three active sports venues which includes Empower Field at Mile High, home of the Denver Broncos; Ball Arena, home of the Colorado Avalanche and Denver Nuggets; and Coors Field, home of the Colorado Rockies. There is also a Major League Soccer (MLS) team based in the Denver metro area (Colorado Rapids), but they do not play their home games in the city of Denver; the team is located in nearby Commerce City.

Denver, and the wider metropolitan area, is home to six college sports teams with two schools having NCAA Division I programs and four schools with NCAA Division II programs. The Division I Colorado Buffaloes are located in Boulder which is part of the metro area while the Denver Pioneers are located in Denver. Division II MSU Denver Roadrunners and Regis Rangers are also located in Denver, while Colorado Christian University and the Colorado School of Mines are located in the western Denver suburbs of Lakewood and Golden respectively.

== Major league professional teams ==
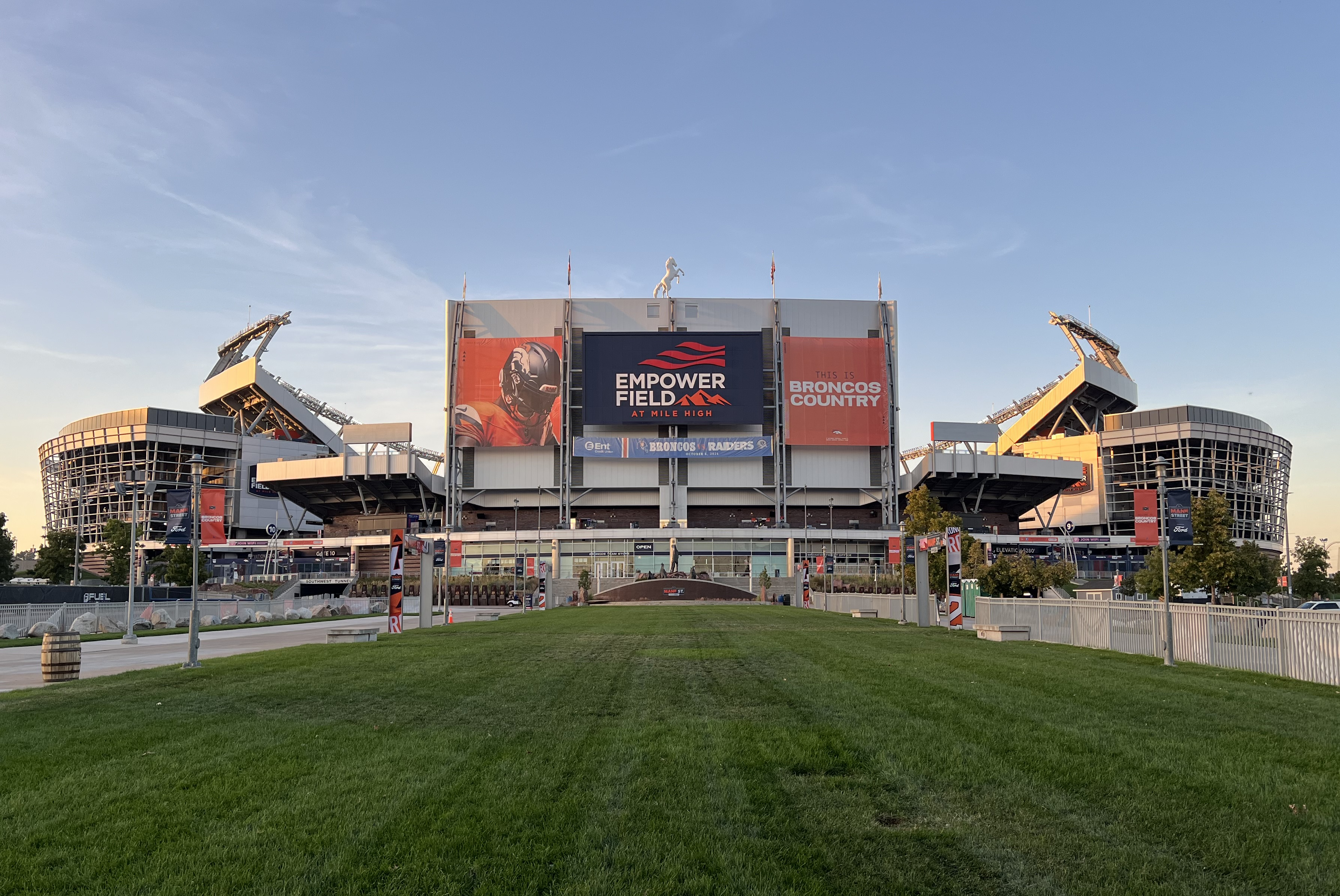
Empower Field at Mile High

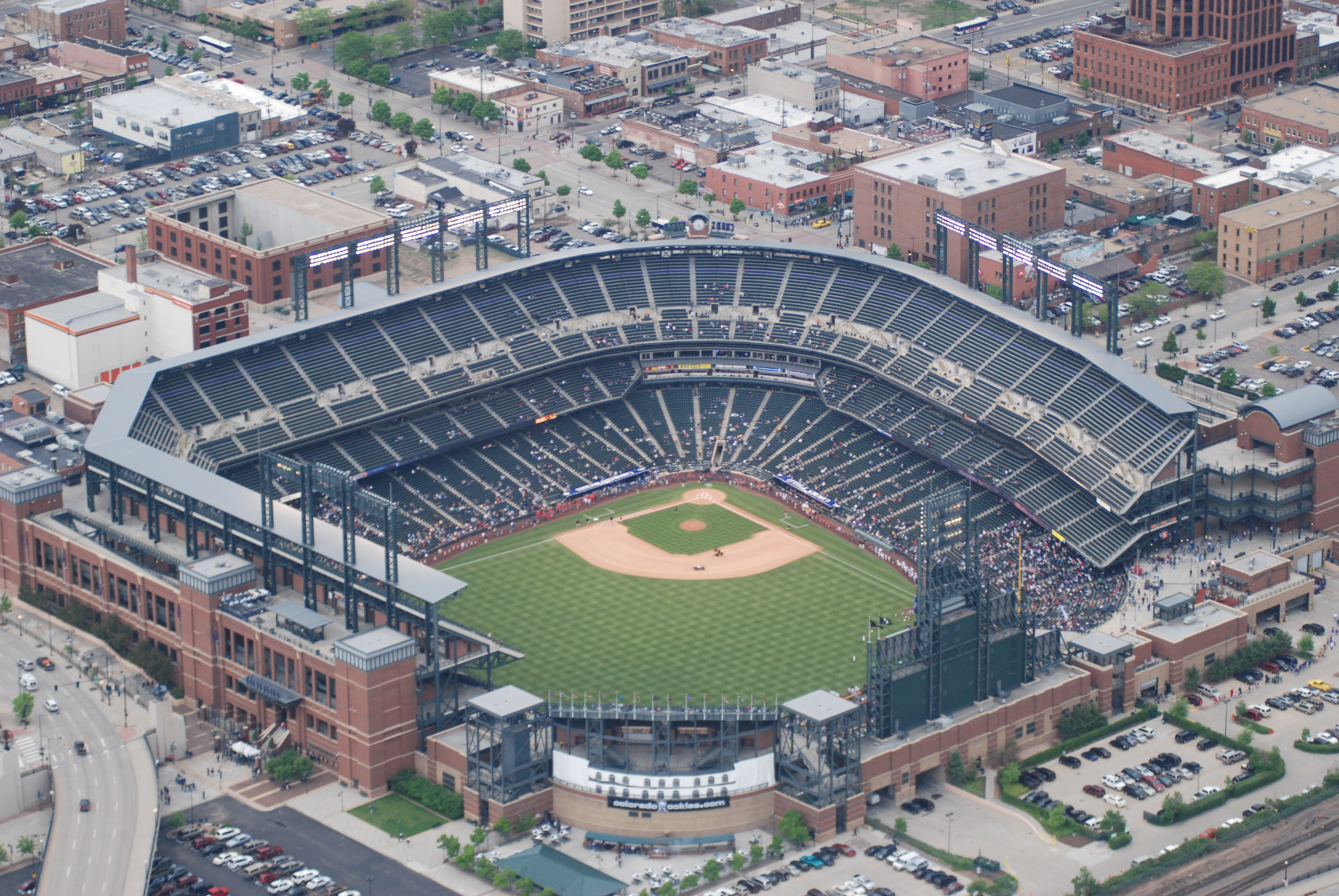
Coors Field

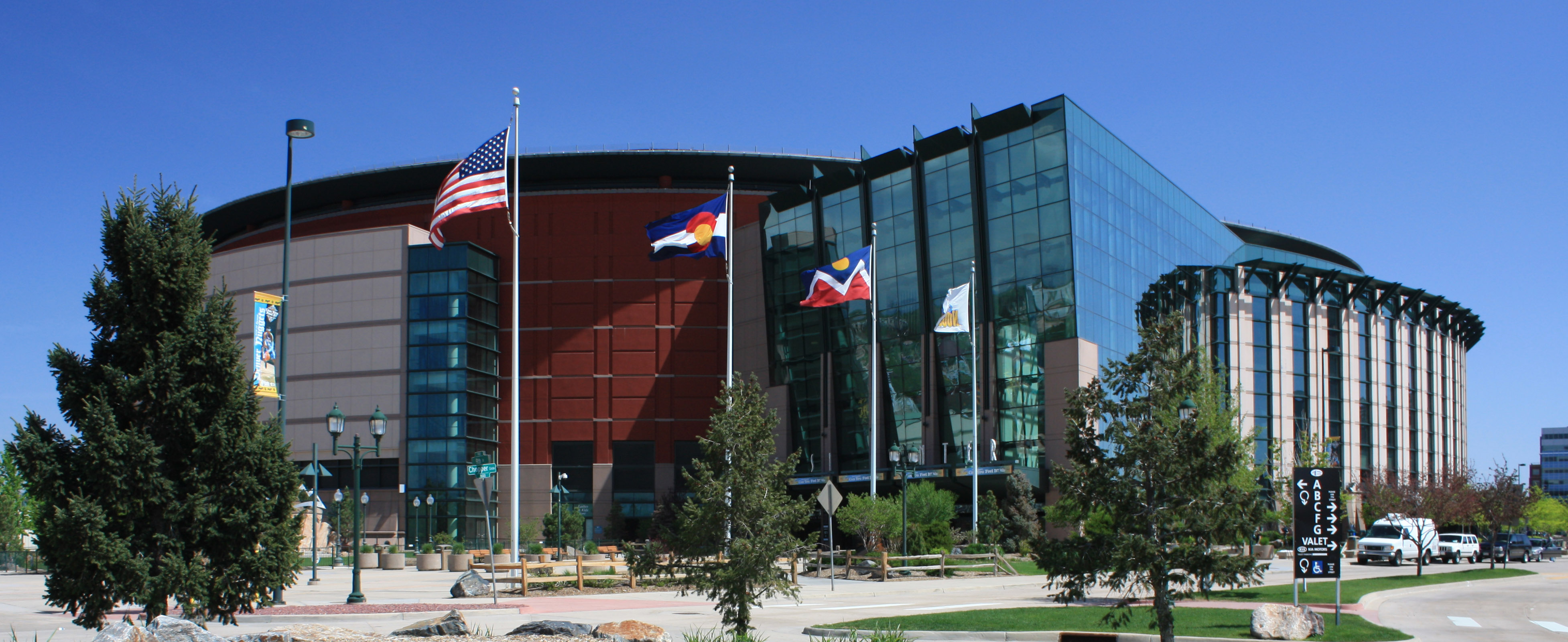
Ball Arena

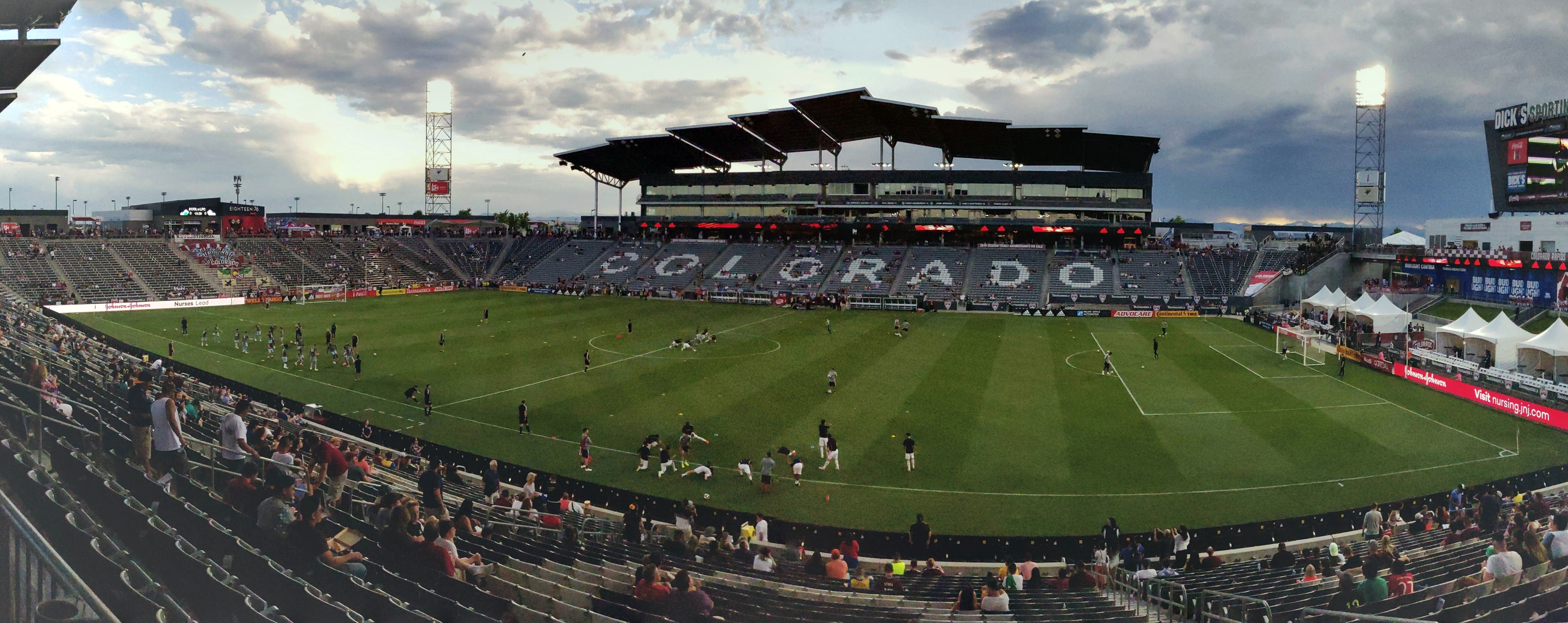
Dick's Sporting Goods Park

Denver is the least populous of the 12 U.S. cities with teams from four major sports.

The Denver Broncos of the National Football League (NFL) have drawn crowds of over 70,000 since their AFL origins in the early 1960s at Mile High Stadium and continue to draw fans today to their current home Empower Field at Mile High. The Broncos have sold out every home game (except for strike-replacement games) since 1970. The Broncos last championship was in 2016, defeating the Carolina Panthers in Super Bowl 50. In total, the Broncos have advanced to the Super Bowl eight times and won back-to-back titles in 1998 and 1999, and again in 2015.

In the 1980s and 90s, one of the top priorities of former Mayor Federico Peña was bringing Major League Baseball to the city. In 1993, the MLB awarded an expansion team to Denver and they were named the Colorado Rockies. Mile High Stadium was home to the Rockies from 1993 to 1995 while Coors Field was under construction. They appeared in their first World Series in 2007 after winning their first NL pennant, their only one to this day, where they were swept by the Boston Red Sox of the American League in four games.

The Denver Nuggets of the National Basketball Association (NBA) play at Ball Arena. The team was founded as the Denver Larks in 1967 as a charter franchise of the American Basketball Association (ABA) but changed its name to the Denver Rockets before their first season. They changed their name to the Denver Nuggets in 1974. The team joined the NBA in 1976 after the ABA-NBA merger. They made their first NBA finals appearance in May 2023, after sweeping the Los Angeles Lakers in the Western Conference Finals. In the 2023 NBA Finals, the Nuggets defeated the Miami Heat in five games to win their first NBA title in franchise history.

Denver is also home to the Colorado Avalanche, a National Hockey League (NHL) team that relocated from Quebec City in 1995. They have won three Stanley Cups in 1996, 2001 and in 2022 while playing in Denver, and they also play at Ball Arena. The Avalanche played the Detroit Red Wings in the first ever outdoor professional hockey game in Denver on Saturday, February 27, 2016, at Coors Field and again against the Los Angeles Kings at the Air Force Academy on Saturday, February 15, 2020.

The Colorado Rapids of Major League Soccer (MLS) play at Dick's Sporting Goods Park, a soccer-specific stadium in the Denver suburb of Commerce City. The Rapids were one of the ten founding teams of Major League Soccer that began play in 1996, and initially played at what was then known as Invesco Field at Mile High before moving into their current home in 2007. The Rapids won the MLS Cup in 2010. The Rapids' main rival is Real Salt Lake, and the two teams play every year for the Rocky Mountain Cup. Dick's Sporting Goods Park has also hosted several international soccer matches, including U.S. national team qualifying matches for the 2010 and 2014 World Cups. Denver was also awarded a NWSL team called Denver Summit FC in 2025.

Club	Sport	League	Venue	Capacity	Since	Notes
Denver Broncos	Football	NFL	Empower Field at Mile High	76,125	1960	The Denver Broncos started in the American Football League (AFL) in 1960 and didn't join the NFL until 1970 after the AFL–NFL Merger
Denver Nuggets	Basketball	NBA	Ball Arena	19,502	1967	The Denver Nuggets began playing in the American Basketball Association (ABA) and didn't join the NBA until 1976 after the ABA–NBA merger
Colorado Rockies	Baseball	MLB	Coors Field	46,897	1993	The Colorado Rockies are a 1993 MLB expansion team. They began playing at Mile High Stadium until 1995
Colorado Avalanche	Ice hockey	NHL	Ball Arena	17,809	1995	The Colorado Avalanche began in Quebec City as the Quebec Nordiques in 1972. They began playing in the World Hockey Association (WHA) and didn't join the NHL until 1979
Colorado Rapids	Soccer	MLS	Dick's Sporting Goods Park	18,061	1996	The Colorado Rapids are one of the original MLS teams that began playing in 1996. They played at Mile High Stadium until 2001
Colorado Mammoth	Box Lacrosse	NLL	Ball Arena	17,809	2003	The Colorado Mammoth began as the Baltimore Thunder in 1987 and then became the Pittsburgh CrosseFire in 2000, then moved to Washington D.C. in 2001 to become the Washington Power until relocating to Denver in 2003
Denver Outlaws	Field Lacrosse	PLL	Cross Country Playing- No Specific Field	-	2024	Denver Outlaws, former Major League Lacrosse team (2006–2020), ceased operations after the MLL–PLL merger. Then in 2024 the Denver Outlaws took place of the former team Chrome as a part of the home city PLL expansion.
Denver Summit FC	Soccer	NWSL	Centennial Stadium	63,004	2025	Denver Summit in a NWSL expansion team that began playing in 2025. They played at Centennial Stadium as well as several special games at Empower Field at Mile High and Dick's Sporting Goods Park until the completion of their own stadium in 2028.
Denver Onyx	Rugby union	WER	Infinity Park	-	2025	Denver Oynx is a founding team of Women’s Elite Rugby that began for the 2025 season.

=== Top tier amateur teams ===
Denver and the wider metro area is also home to other notable sports teams.

Team	League	Venue	Notes
Glendale Merlins	Pacific Rugby Premiership	Infinity Park	The Glendale Merlins began as the Colorado Raptors and were the Glendale Raptors until 2017. They include a men's team in the Pacific Rugby Premiership and a women's team in the Women's Premier League. Its top side team played in Major League Rugby from 2018 to 2020.
Denver Barbarians	USA Rugby	Infinity Park	The Denver Barbarians were founded in 1967 and are currently competing in USA Rugby
Denver Highlanders RFC	USA Rugby	Jacob Park	The Denver Highlanders were founded in 1968 and a perennially competitive Rugby Football men's club
Denver Bulldogs	U.S. Australian Football League	Cleer Creek Valley Park	The Denver Bulldogs consist of men's and women's teams competing in the highest Divison of Australian Rules Football in the US.

=== College sports teams ===
- Colorado Buffaloes: The CU Buffaloes are a member of the Big 12 Conference and are located in Boulder.
- Denver Pioneers: The DU Pioneers, located in the city of Denver, play in NCAA Division I and are a member of The Summit League through the 2025–26 school year, after which DU will join the West Coast Conference. In sports not sponsored by either conference, it is a member of several other conferences; most notably, the men's ice hockey team plays in the National Collegiate Hockey Conference, the women's gymnastics team in the Big 12 Conference, and the men's and women's lacrosse teams in the Big East Conference.
- MSU Denver Roadrunners: The MSU Denver Roadrunners play in NCAA Division II and are a member of the Rocky Mountain Athletic Conference and are located in Denver.
- Regis Rangers: The Regis Rangers play in NCAA Division II and are a member of the Rocky Mountain Athletic Conference and are located in Denver.

=== Former teams ===
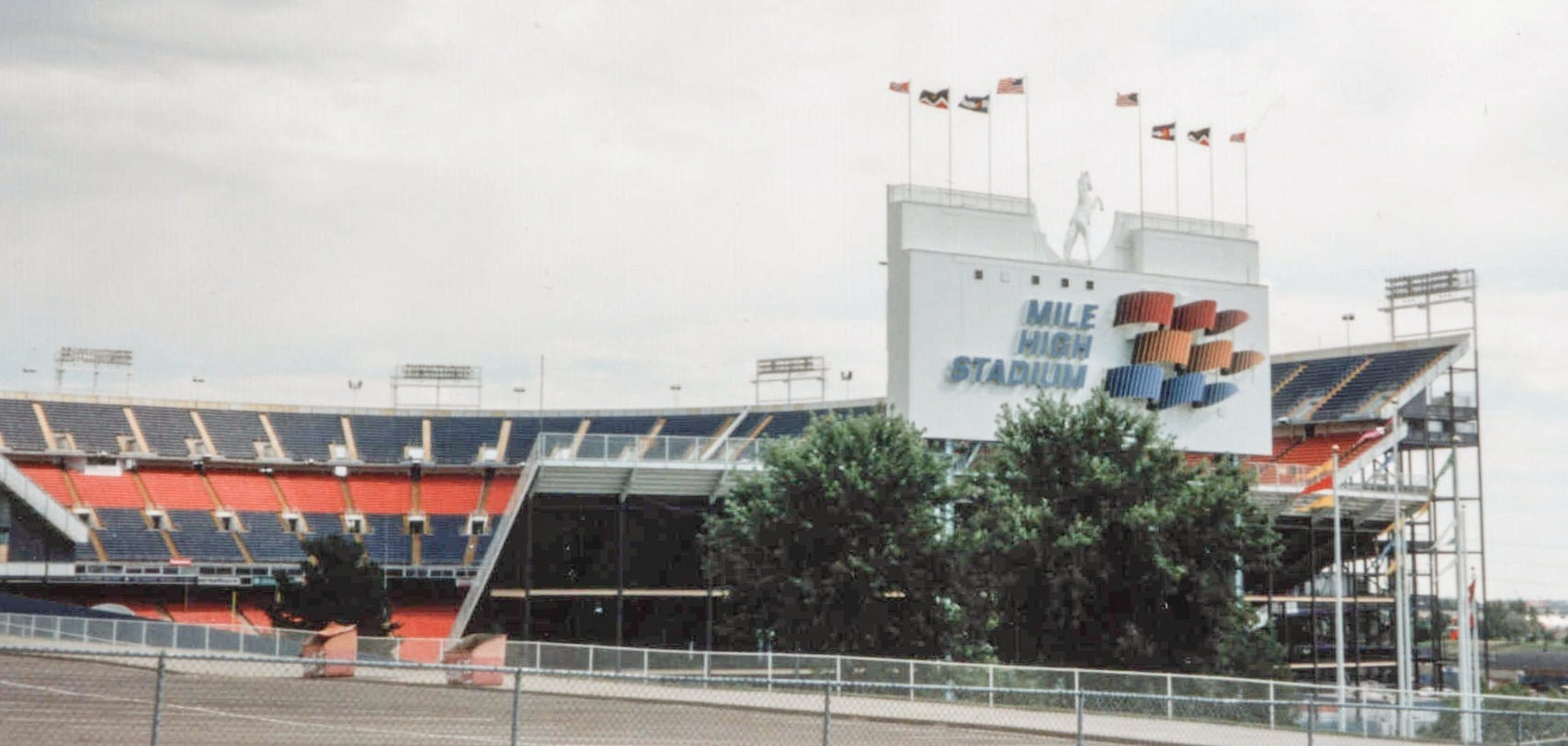
Mile High Stadium was Empower Field's predecessor.

- Denver Bears (Western League) former Western League team (1885–1954); replaced by the new Denver Bears
- Denver Zephyrs originally, the Denver Bears, who played in the American Association (1955–1962, 1969–1992) and the Pacific Coast League (1963–1968) moved to New Orleans in 1992. Now play as the Wichita Wind Surge
- Denver Nuggets former National Basketball League & National Basketball Association team (1948–1950); folded as the Evansville Agogans
- Denver Spurs former World Hockey Association team (1975–76); folded as the Ottawa Civics
- Colorado Rockies former National Hockey League team (1976–1982); now play as the New Jersey Devils
- Denver Avalanche former Major Indoor Soccer League team (1980–1982); ceased operations
- Colorado Flames former Central Professional Hockey League team (1982–1984); league ceased operations
- Denver Gold former United States Football League team (1983–1985); ceased operations
- Denver Dynamite former Arena Football League team (1987, 1989–1991); ceased operations
- Denver Rangers former International Hockey League team (1988–1989); folded as the Phoenix Roadrunners
- Denver Grizzlies former International Hockey League team (1994–1995); relocated to Utah after one season. Now play in the American Hockey League as the Cleveland Monsters
- Colorado Crush former Arena Football League team (2003–2008); the AFL suspended operations indefinitely
- Denver Cutthroats former Central Hockey League team (2012–2014); league ceased operations
- Denver Stampede former PRO Rugby team (2016–2017); league ceased operations after one season
- Colorado Raptors former Major League Rugby team (2018–2020); withdrew from the league after three seasons of play
- Denver Dynamite (soccer) former PASL-Pro (2008–2010) & PASL-Premier (2011–2015) team; ceased operations
- Furniture Row Racing, former NASCAR team that fielded the #78 Chevrolet SS for Martin Truex Jr., was owned and sponsored by the U.S. furniture store chain Furniture Row as the only NASCAR team headquartered in Colorado until 2018.
- Denver Outlaws, former Major League Lacrosse team (2006–2020), ceased operations after the MLL–PLL merger

== Event hosting ==
=== Local events ===
- Denver hosted a yearly auto race on the Champ Car World Series circuit, the Grand Prix of Denver, before that series' demise in 2008.
- The Colorado Colfax Marathon is run through the city annually.

=== "Big Four" events ===
- The 1998 and 2021 Major League Baseball All-Star Game at Coors Field.
- The 2001 NHL All-Star Game and FanFest at Pepsi Center.
- The ABA All-Star Game in 1976, the 1984 NBA All-Star Game at McNichols Arena, and the 2005 NBA All-Star game at Pepsi Center.

=== International events ===
- Initially awarded the 1976 Winter Olympics. However, due to rising costs and worries about environmental impact, voters rejected a public-funding ballot measure. Without the bond, Denver could not support the games, and the IOC retracted the award.
- The city strongly considered a bid for the 2022 Winter Olympics. In December 2011 a Denver 2022 exploratory committee was launched. Reno-Tahoe was also interested in bidding for 2022.
- The Churchill Cup, a now-defunct annual international competition in rugby union featuring the USA and Canada senior national teams, the England Saxons (that country's second-level national team), and three invited teams, was hosted by Denver in 2009, with matches held at the rugby-specific Infinity Park in Glendale and Dick's Sporting Goods Park. Denver was suggested as a permanent home for the competition. The 2010 tournament featured preliminary rounds in Denver. Also, Denver was reportedly in the running to host a Bledisloe Cup match between the Australia and New Zealand national teams, possibly in 2010, though that did not materialize.

=== Other events ===
- Denver co-hosted the 1962 International Ice Hockey Federation World Championships (together with Colorado Springs).
- Denver also hosted the 1990 NCAA Final Four at McNichols Arena.
- The Ultimate Fighting Championship, which eventually become the world's leading mixed martial arts organization, held its first two events in Denver—UFC 1 on November 12, 1993, and UFC 2 on March 11, 1994.
- The 2008 NCAA Frozen Four Tournament was hosted in Denver.
- Denver was the host for Sportaccord 2009, the largest international sports convention in the world.
- Infinity Park became the new host of the USA Women's Sevens, the country's stop in the World Rugby Women's Sevens Series for national rugby sevens teams, in 2018.

== Detailed information by team ==
=== Current teams ===
Club	League	Venue	Championships			Since
Club	League	Venue	Division	Conference	League	Since
Centennial Tigers	USAFL	Sweetwater Park			0	2020
Colorado Avalanche	NHL	McNichols Sports Arena (1995–1999); Ball Arena (1999–present)	13	3	Stanley Cups: 3 President's Trophies: 4	1995
Colorado Mammoth	NLL	Ball Arena (2003–present)	3	2 (Note: NLL began conference play in the 2021–22 season)	2	2003
Colorado Rapids	MLS	Mile High Stadium (1996–2001); Invesco Field at Mile High (2002–2006); Dick's Sporting Goods Park (2007–present)		2	MLS Cups: 1 U.S. Open Cups: 0	1996
Colorado Rockies	MLB (NL)	Mile High Stadium (1993–1994); Coors Field (1995–present)	0	Pennants: 1	0	1993
Denver Barbarians	Pacific Rugby Premiership; Rugby Super League (United States) (1997–2012)	Infinity Park			Division DI: 1 RSL: 1 Division DII: 1	1967
Denver Broncos	AFL (1960–1969); NFL (1970–present)	Mile High Stadium (1960–2000); Empower Field at Mile High (2001–present)	AFL: 0 NFL: 16	AFL: 0 NFL: 8	AFL: 0 NFL: 3	1960
Denver Bulldogs	USAFL	Veterans Park (1999–present)			Men's Team: 8 Women's Team: 6	1999
Denver Nuggets	ABA (1967–1976); NBA (1976–present)	Denver Coliseum (1967–1975); McNichols Sports Arena (1975–1999); Ball Arena (1999–present)	ABA: 2 NBA: 10	ABA: 0 NBA: 1	ABA: 0 NBA: 1	1967
Glendale Merlins (Glendale Raptors, 2007–2017)	Pacific Rugby Premiership	Infinity Park (2007–2017)			Men's Team: 3 Women's Team: 2	2007
Denver Summit FC	NWSL	Centennial Stadium				2026
Denver Onyx	WER	Infinity Park			2	2025

=== College teams ===
School	Team	League	Venue	Championship			Since
School	Team	League	Venue	Division	Conference	National	Since
University of Denver	Denver Pioneers	NCAA Division I	University of Denver Arena (1948–1998); Magness Arena (1999–present)		Hockey tournaments: 19; Final Frozen Four: 21	NCAA total: 36 Hockey 11; Men's lacrosse 1 Skiing 14 Co-ed; Skiing 10	1925

=== Former teams ===
Club	League	Venue	Championship			Played
Club	League	Venue	Division	Conference	League	Played
Colorado Crush	AFL	Pepsi Center	2	1	1	2003–2008
Colorado Raptors (2020); Glendale Raptors (2018–2019)	MLR	Infinity Park			0	2018–2020 (Note: Team withdrew from league in 2020)
Colorado Rockies	NHL	McNichols Arena	0	0	0	1976–1982
Denver Bears (Western League)	Western League				Western League (1885-1899) Pennants: 2 Class titles: 5	1885–1954
Denver Cutthroats	CHL	Denver Coliseum			0	2012–2014
Denver Dynamite	AFL	McNichols Arena			1	1987–1991
Denver Dynamite (soccer)	PASL-Pro (2008–2010); PASL-Premier	Denver Sports Center (2008); Denver Bladium (2009); Westridge Recreation Center (2010–2011); Apex Field House (2012–2014); Parker Fieldhouse (2009, 2014–2015)	0		0	2008–2015
Denver Grizzlies	IHL	McNichols Arena	1		1	1994–1995
Denver Nuggets	NBL (1948–1949); NBA (1949–1950); Also played in other leagues	Denver Auditorium Arena			AAU tournament: 3	1932–1951
Denver Outlaws	MLL	Empower Field at Mile High (2006–2019); Peter Barton Lacrosse Stadium (2019)		2	3	2006–2020
Denver Spurs	WHL (1968–1974); CHL (1974–1975); WHA (1975–1976)	Denver Coliseum (1968–1975); McNichols Arena (1975–1976)			1	1968–1976
Denver Stampede	PRO Rugby	CIBER Field			1	2016
Denver Zephyrs; Denver Bears (1955–1983)	American Association (1955–1962, 1969–1992); PCL (1963–1968)	Mile High Stadium			Class titles: 2 League titles: 7	1955–1992

== See also ==
- Sports in Colorado
- Bibliography of Colorado
- Geography of Colorado
- History of Colorado
- Index of Colorado-related articles
- List of Colorado-related lists
- Outline of Colorado
