= Sean O'Leary (rugby union) =

Sean O'Leary is a rugby union coach, and was the head coach of PRO Rugby team Denver Stampede in its only season in 2016.

Previously, O'Leary served as head coach and director of rugby of the Notre Dame Rugby Football Club from 2007 to 2015. O"Leary held this full-time paid position, thanks to an alumni endowment fund. Under O'Leary's leadership, Notre Dame played in the Collegiate Rugby Championship — a tournament that is broadcast on NBC, gaining valuable exposure for the school's rugby program — as well as the Varsity Cup. O'Leary stepped down from the Notre Dame position in September 2015.

Before Notre Dame, O'Leary was the head coach at Northeastern University and at Boston College High School.

O'Leary has also been involved with the United States national youth teams. O'Leary served as an assistant coach for the United States under-19 team from 2002 to 2005, and then as head coach of the United States under-17 team from 2005 to 2008.

== See also ==
- Notre Dame Rugby Football Club
- Denver Stampede
