= Brodie Orth =

American rugby union player

Brodie Orth is an American rugby union player for the Denver Stampede in PRO Rugby. His position is Lock. His previous clubs include Northland RFC (Missouri, USA), Kansas City Blues and Tawa RFC. He is the uncle of Boston Orth.
