= Michael Garrity =

American rugby union player

- Born: 11 January 1989 (age 37) Centennial, Colorado
- Height: 6 ft 2 in (1.88 m)
- Weight: 225 lb (102 kg)
- School: Regis Jesuit High School
- University: Colorado State University

Rugby union career
- Position: Centre
Amateur team(s)
Years	Team	Apps	(Points)
2011-2014	Denver Barbarians		
2015-2018	Seattle Saracens		
Senior career
Years	Team	Apps	(Points)
2016	Denver Stampede		
2018	Seattle Seawolves	1	(0)
International career
Years	Team	Apps	(Points)
2016	USA	2	(0)

Michael Garrity (born 11 January 1989) is an American professional rugby union player. He plays as a centre for the Seattle Seawolves in Major League Rugby, previously playing for Denver Stampede in PRO Rugby
