= Paule Barford =

American rugby coach

Paule Barford is a rugby union coach. He has been the head coach of the PRO Rugby team Ohio Aviators since February 2016.

Barford is originally from England, where he played with the Leicester Tigers. Following his playing days, Barford has held a number of rugby coaching positions, and holds a World Rugby Level 3 coaching certification. Barford is also a longtime member of the USA youth levels coaching staffs, including the High School All Americans, U-17 and U-20 teams. He has also coached the USA Selects. Barford was hired as head coach of the Cornell rugby program in 2013. He took a Cornell team that had finished 0–6 in 2012 and led them to a 6–0 record in 2013; despite player graduations and injuries, he led the team to a second-place finish in the 2014 Ivy League season.
