= Pedrie Wannenburg =

South African rugby union player (1981–2022)

Pedrie Wannenberg
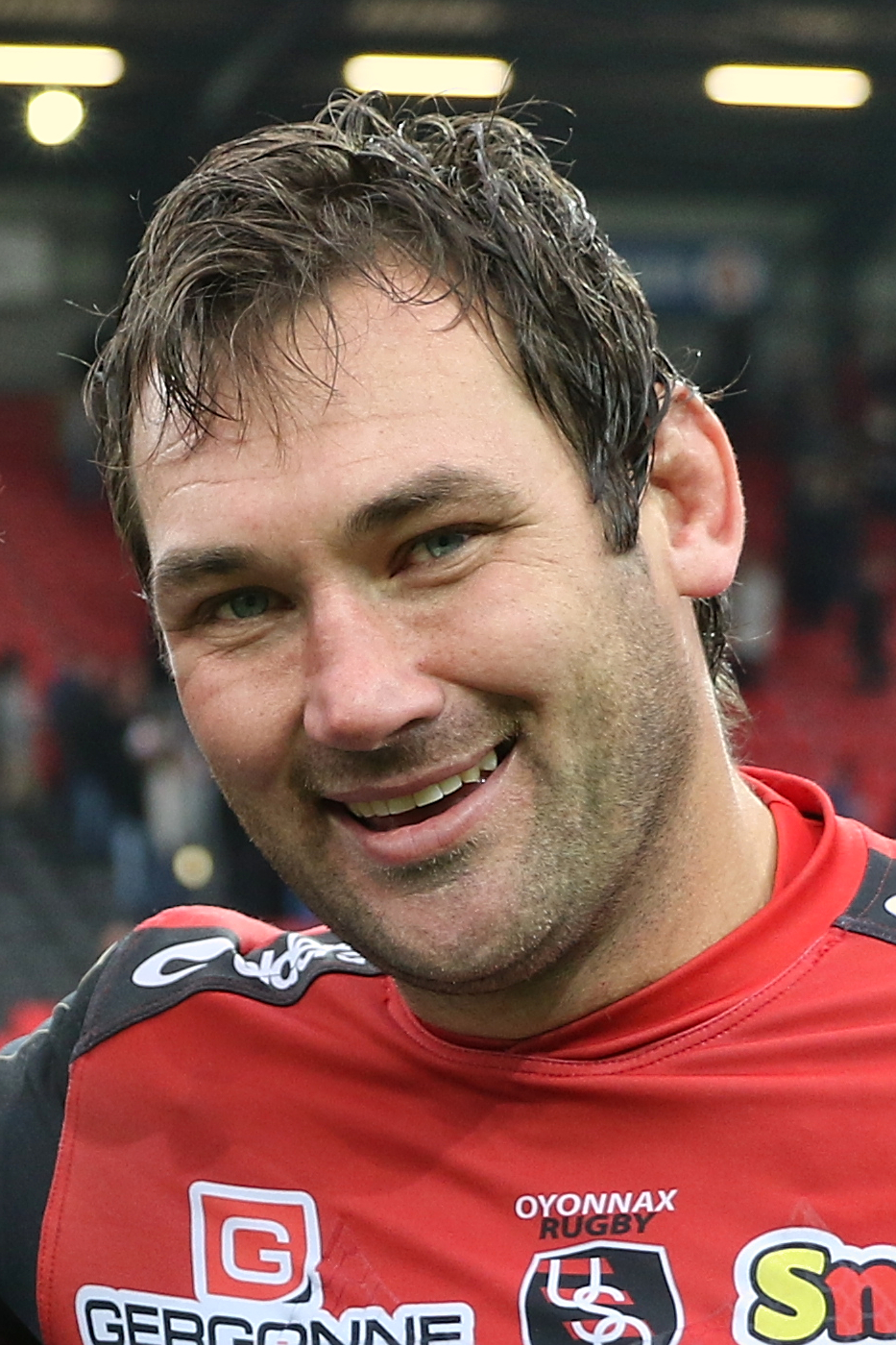
- Wannenburg with Oyonnax in 2015
- Born: Pedrie Johannes Wannenburg; 2 January 1981 Nelspruit, South Africa
- Died: 22 April 2022 (aged 41) Houston, Texas, US
- Height: 1.96 m (6 ft 5 in)
- Weight: 112 kg (17 st 9 lb; 247 lb)

Rugby union career
- Position: Flanker
Senior career
Years	Team	Apps	(Points)
2010–2012	Ulster	54	(45)
2012–2014	Castres	31	(0)
2014–2016	Oyonnax	51	(10)
2016	Denver Stampede	1	(0)
2018	Austin Elite		
- Correct as of 17 April 2016
Provincial / State sides
Years	Team	Apps	(Points)
2001–2010	Blue Bulls	80	(110)
Super Rugby
Years	Team	Apps	(Points)
2002–2010	Bulls	105	(65)
International career
Years	Team	Apps	(Points)
2002–2007	South Africa	20	(15)
- Correct as of 14 July 2007
Coaching career
- Years: Team
- 2019–2022: Austin Elite (assistant)

Pedrie Johannes Wannenburg (2 January 1981 – 22 April 2022) was a South African rugby union player. He last coached for Austin Elite Rugby in North American Major League Rugby. He played for Austin in 2018, Denver Stampede in the now defunct PRO Rugby League of North America and Castres Olympique for two seasons, after two years with Irish club Ulster.

He also represented the South African Bulls in the southern hemisphere Super 14 competition, in a team record consecutive run of 99 matches, spanning seasons 2002 to 2010 with a total of 106 matches for them.

Wannenburg signed to the Denver Stampede in early 2016, and captained the team.

== Rugby union career ==
=== Club ===
Wannenburg made his provincial debut in 2001 against the Golden Lions. In 2002 Wannenburg made his Super Rugby debut against the ACT Brumbies. Wannenburg was the first player to play 100 games for the Blue Bulls and also 99 consecutive games for the Bulls. He won three Super Rugby titles with the Bulls in 2007, 2009 and 2010, as well as five Currie Cups, and became their most capped player with 114 Super Rugby appearances.

In June 2010, he decided to take on a new challenge with Ulster in Ireland competing in the Heineken Cup and Pro12. He played in Ulster's 2012 Heineken Cup Final defeat to Leinster. He left Ulster at the end of the 2011–2012 season and signed a two-year contract with French side Castres.

=== International ===
In November 2002, Wannenburg made his first test appearance for the Springboks against France. He narrowly missed selection to the victorious South Africa squad for the 2007 Rugby World Cup.

He had 20 caps for the Springboks.

== Personal life ==
Wannenburg was born in Nelspruit (now Mbombela).

Following problems with drugs and alcohol in South Africa, Wannenburg became a Christian. During his time with Ulster, he attended church in Belfast with his fellow South Africans and Ulster team-mates Johann Muller and Ruan Pienaar. While at Ulster, he married Evette and the couple had two children, a daughter Isabelle, followed by a son, François in 2013.

== Death ==
He died on 22 April 2022 in Houston, Texas, US, after his car was struck while at an intersection by a vehicle driven by a 16-year-old who was trying to evade a police stop. His wife and children were all in the car at the time. His son sustained life-threatening injuries.
