= Zac Mizell =

- Born: September 1, 1988 (age 38)
- Height: 6 ft 3 in (1.91 m)
- Weight: 86 kg (190 lb; 13 st 8 lb)

Rugby union career
- Position: Fullback
Amateur team(s)
Years	Team	Apps	(Points)
- Dallas Harlequins
Senior career
Years	Team	Apps	(Points)
2016	Ohio Aviators		
2018	Austin Elite		
International career
Years	Team	Apps	(Points)
2012	USA Selects		
National sevens team
Years	Team		Comps
2013	United States 7s		6

Zac Mizell (born September 1, 1988) is an American rugby union player for the Austin Elite in Major League Rugby, he previously played for the Ohio Aviators in PRO Rugby. His position is at fullback.

He played amateur rugby for Dallas Harlequins and has represented the United States in rugby sevens. He signed with the Ohio Aviators for the inaugural PRO Rugby season in 2016.
