= Filippo Ferrarini =

Italian rugby union player

- Born: 7 September 1990 (age 36) Parma, Italy
- Height: 1.83 m (6 ft 0 in)
- Weight: 100 kg (220 lb)

Rugby union career
- Position: Flanker
Senior career
Years	Team	Apps	(Points)
2010–11	Crociati Parma	15	(15)
2011–12	Aironi	14	(5)
2012–16	Zebre	43	(10)
2016	Ohio Aviators	11	(30)
2016−17	Mogliano	10	(0)
2016−17	→Benetton	2	(0)
2017−18	Rugby Reggio	10	(5)
2018−20	Viadana	23	(15)
2021−22	Noceto		
- Correct as of 17 April 2017
International career
Years	Team	Apps	(Points)
2009−10	Italy Under 20	17	(10)
2013	Emerging Italy	3	(0)
- Correct as of 1 June 2013
Coaching career
- Years: Team
- 2022−2024: Rugby Noceto (Head coach)
- 2024–: Valorugby Emilia (Assistant coach)

Filippo Ferrarini (born 7 September 1990) was an Italian rugby union player who played as a flanker. From summer 2024 he is Assistan Coach of Valorugby Emilia in Serie A Elite.

In 2016 he also played for Ohio Aviators in the US PRO Rugby competition and he previously played with Zebre in the Pro12. In 2016-17 Pro12 season he named as Additional Player for Benetton Treviso. In summer 2021 he signed for Rugby Noceto in Serie A.

He was called for Italy A squad at the 2013 IRB Nations Cup.
