= Mose Timoteo =

US international rugby union player

- Born: Mose Alaric Timoteo; 7 September 1976 (age 50) Pago Pago, American Samoa
- Height: 5 ft 7 in (1.70 m)
- Weight: 175 lb (79 kg; 12.5 st)

Rugby union career
- Position: Scrum-half
Senior career
Years	Team	Apps	(Points)
2016	Denver Stampede	10	(5)
- Correct as of 28 December 2020
International career
Years	Team	Apps	(Points)
2000–2012	United States	32	(15)
- Correct as of 23 June 2012

Mose Alaric Timoteo (born 7 September 1976) is a former American rugby union player. He represented USA at the 2003 Rugby World Cup. He made his debut for the Eagles against Tonga in 2000. He made his last international appearance against Italy on June 23, 2012.

He is the Back line Coach for the Hayward Griffins U-19 Rugby Club in California.
