= Spike Davis =

US international rugby union player

- Born: June 20, 1990 (age 36) Lake Elsinore, CA
- Height: 6 ft 4 in (1.93 m)
- Weight: 250 lb (110 kg; 17 st 12 lb)

Rugby union career
- Position: No. 8, Wing
Senior career
| Years | Team | Apps | (Points) |
| 2016 | Ohio Aviators | 12 | (70) |
International career
| Years | Team | Apps | (Points) |
| 2017 | United States | 3 | (5) |

Aaron Spike Davis is an American rugby union player who last played for the Ohio Aviators in PRO Rugby. His position is at Wing. He represented the United States in the 2017 Americas Rugby Championship. He signed with the Ohio Aviators for the inaugural PRO Rugby season in 2016 but was unable to sign for a Major League Rugby side due to being banned for using prohibited performance enhancing substances by World Rugby.

== Career ==
Before taking up rugby on a full-time professional basis, Davis played American football. He played college football for the SMU Mustangs from 2009 to 2012. He started as a walk-on football player at SMU but earned a scholarship. At SMU, he bulked up from 215 to 290 pounds, and played defensive line and special teams. He hoped to play in the NFL after college, and was involved in mini camps for the Green Bay Packers and Washington Redskins in the NFL, but never signed with a team.

In the inaugural 2016 PRO Rugby season, Davis led the league in tries with 14, five more than the next closest player's tally.

== Drugs Ban ==
In August 2017 it was announced that Spike Davis had failed a urine drug screen in January 2017 and following a failed appeal had been issued a ban by World Rugby preventing him from playing rugby at any level for 4 years. Spike became eligible to resume playing rugby on 17 March 2021.

== Return to Rugby ==
In 2021, Davis' rugby ban ended, and he was allowed to return to competitive rugby. Since late 2021, he has been playing for Dallas Rugby Football Club, one of the top D1 USA Club rugby teams. In 2022, Davis started on the right wing for 2022 USA Club rugby men's D1 national championship. He scored the opening try en route in the winning effort.
