= Dylan Fawsitt =

US international rugby union player and coach (b. 1990)

- Born: July 24, 1990 (age 36) Wexford, Ireland
- Height: 6 ft 0 in (183 cm)
- Weight: 235 lb (107 kg)
- School: Blackrock College
- University: Life University

Rugby union career
- Position: Hooker
Amateur team(s)
Years	Team	Apps	(Points)
1997–2012	Greystones		
2012–2014	St. Mary's		
2016–2017	Old Blue		
- Correct as of 9 April 2018
Senior career
Years	Team	Apps	(Points)
2016	Ohio Aviators	10	(25)
2018–	Rugby New York	43	(130)
2018	→ Glendale Raptors (loan)	8	(5)
2020	→ Ohio Aviators (loan)		
–	Chicago Hounds		
- Correct as of 6 March 2023
International career
Years	Team	Apps	(Points)
2018–	United States	18	(15)
- Correct as of 3 October 2021

Dylan Fawsitt (born July 24, 1990) is an Irish-born American rugby union player who plays as a hooker for Chicago (Hounds) in Major League Rugby (MLR) and also for the United States men's national team. His nickname is "The Butcher".

Fawsitt previously played for the Glendale Raptors and the Ohio Aviators. Prior to moving to the United States in 2014, Fawsitt played rugby for Greystones, Blackrock College, and St. Mary's College in Ireland. In addition to his playing career, Fawsitt coaches rugby at Monroe College and Fordham Preparatory School in New York City.

== Early life ==
Fawsitt grew up in Ireland and moved to Wicklow at the age of 10. Prior to the move to Wexford, Fawsitt began playing rugby with Greystones RFC at the age of seven. Fawsitt also played hurling and Gaelic football as a youth for St. Martin's GAA. Fawsitt attended Blackrock College and was a member of their 2009 rugby team that won the Leinster Schools Senior Cup in 2009. Fawsitt concluded his tenure with Greystones by competing at the first team level for three years through 2012. Fawsitt then played for St. Mary's College for two years in the All-Ireland League's Division 1A.

== Move to the United States ==
In 2014, Fawsitt moved to the United States to attend Life University, where he earned a master's degree in exercise science. There he played and coached for the university's rugby teams. After playing with the Ohio Aviators (see section below), Fawsitt moved to New York where he played for Old Blue and serves as an Assistant Coach at Monroe College and Head Coach at Fordham Preparatory School.

== Club career ==
=== Ohio Aviators ===
Fawsitt played for the Ohio Aviators in PRO Rugby's first and only season in 2016. Fawsitt made his debut for the Aviators on May 8, in the Aviators' 31–11 victory over Sacramento. He made his first start for the Aviators in a 24–20 defeat at San Diego on May 15. Fawsitt scored his first try for the Aviators on May 22, in the Aviators' 50–17 victory over Sacramento.

=== Rugby United New York ===
Fawsitt joined Rugby United New York for their inaugural season as an associate member of Major League Rugby in 2018. In 2018, Fawsitt served as the team's captain. Fawsitt scored his first try in a RUNY uniform in a March 25, 2018 exhibition against the Boston Mystics.

On September 19, 2018, RUNY announced that Fawsitt had re-signed with the New York side for the 2019 Major League Rugby season.

He returned to New York in the 2019 MLR season, with a prominent participation, having in regular season 12 tries and 10 try assists, qualifying RUNY in last game to playoffs for first time.

=== Glendale Raptors ===
Fawsitt joined Major League Rugby's Glendale Raptors for the 2018 regular season on loan from RUNY.

== International career ==
Fawsitt made his debut with the USA Eagles on February 24, 2018, starting in the Eagles' 45–16 victory over Brazil in the 2018 Americas Rugby Championship. Fawsitt scored his first try for the Eagles in the Eagles' 61–19 victory over Uruguay on March 3, 2018.

=== International tries ===
As of 20 November 2021

Try	Opposing team	Location	Venue	Competition	Date	Result	Score
1	Uruguay	Montevideo, Uruguay	Estadio Charrúa	2018 Americas Rugby Championship	3 March 2018	Win	19 – 61
2	Canada	Glendale, United States	Infinity Park	2019 World Rugby Pacific Nations Cup	27 July 2019	Win	47 – 19
3	Canada	Vancouver, Canada	BC Place	2019 Rugby World Cup warm-up matches	7 September 2019	Win	15 – 20

== Honours ==
Chicago Hounds

- All Major League Ruby Second team (2025)
