= Obetz, Ohio =

- City
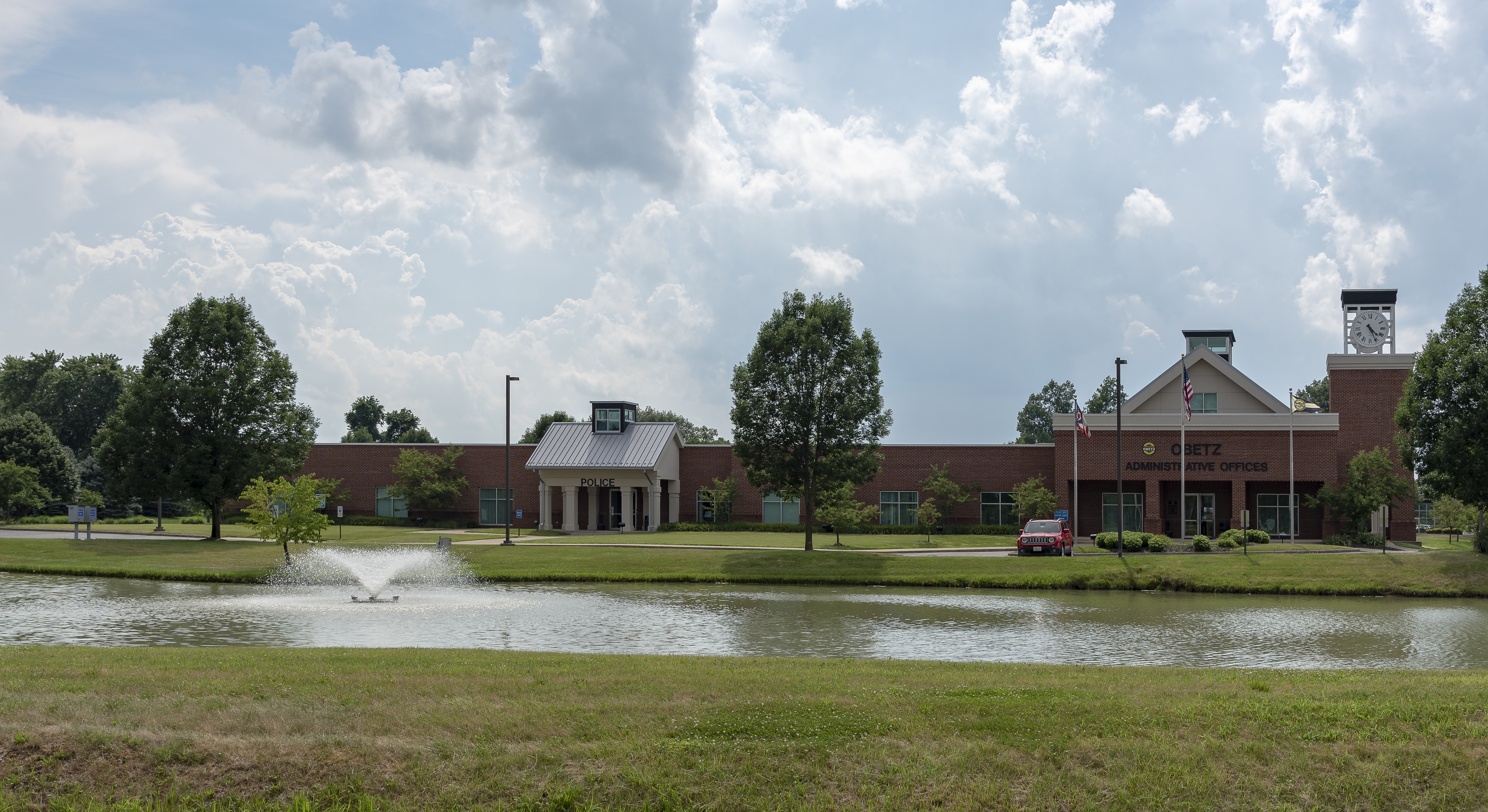
- Obetz Government Center
- Interactive map of Obetz, Ohio
- Location within Ohio Location within the United States
- Coordinates: 39°52′36″N 82°56′40″W
- Country: United States
- State: Ohio
- County: Franklin

Area
  - Total: 5.97 sq mi (15.47 km^{2})
  - Land: 5.83 sq mi (15.09 km^{2})
  - Water: 0.15 sq mi (0.39 km^{2})
- Elevation: 745 ft (227 m)

Population (2020)
  - Total: 5,489
  - Density: 942.3/sq mi (363.84/km^{2})
- Time zone: UTC-5 (Eastern (EST))
  - Summer (DST): UTC-4 (EDT)
- ZIP code: 43207
- Area codes: 614 and 380
- FIPS code: 39-57862
- GNIS feature ID: 2399552
- Website: Village of Obetz, Ohio

Obetz is a city in Franklin County, Ohio, United States. As of the 2020 United States census, the population was 5,489.

== History ==
The community (originally Obetz Junction, in honor of settler Charles Obetz) was formed in 1838 as a stagecoach junction, and incorporated in 1928. Nearby Reese Station served as the railroad station for the immediate area, while other adjacent communities such as Groveport, Lockbourne and Canal Winchester were part of the Ohio and Erie Canal canal and lock system. The close proximity of Obetz Junction to these towns transformed the area into a hub of commerce, travel and trade in the mid-19th century.

== Geography ==
According to the United States Census Bureau, the village has a total area of 5.92 square miles (15.33 km^{2}), of which 5.78 square miles (14.97 km^{2}) is land and 0.14 square miles (0.36 km^{2}) is water.

== Demographics ==
Historical population
Census	Pop.	Note	%±
1940	771		—
1950	1,049		36.1%
1960	1,984		89.1%
1970	2,248		13.3%
1980	3,095		37.7%
1990	3,167		2.3%
2000	3,977		25.6%
2010	4,532		14.0%
2020	5,489		21.1%
U.S. Decennial Census

=== 2010 census ===
As of the census of 2010, there were 4,532 people, 1,667 households, and 1,214 families residing in the village. The population density was 784.1 inhabitants per square mile (302.7/km^{2}). There were 1,807 housing units at an average density of 312.6 per square mile (120.7/km^{2}). The racial makeup of the village was 85.8% White, 7.7% African American, 0.5% Native American, 2.1% Asian, 1.6% from other races, and 2.4% from two or more races. Hispanic or Latino of any race were 2.8% of the population.

There were 1,667 households, of which 40.2% had children under the age of 18 living with them, 49.6% were married couples living together, 16.8% had a female householder with no husband present, 6.5% had a male householder with no wife present, and 27.2% were non-families. 22.2% of all households were made up of individuals, and 6.8% had someone living alone who was 65 years of age or older. The average household size was 2.72 and the average family size was 3.17.

The median age in the village was 35.9 years. 27.6% of residents were under the age of 18; 8.6% were between the ages of 18 and 24; 28.8% were from 25 to 44; 25.2% were from 45 to 64; and 10% were 65 years of age or older. The gender makeup of the village was 49.0% male and 51.0% female.

=== 2000 census ===
As of the census of 2000, there were 3,977 people, 1,488 households, and 1,104 families residing in the village. The population density was 1,055.3 inhabitants per square mile (407.5/km^{2}). There were 1,561 housing units at an average density of 414.2 per square mile (159.9/km^{2}). The racial makeup of the village was 93.71% White, 2.89% African American, 0.70% Native American, 0.15% Asian, 0.03% Pacific Islander, 0.58% from other races, and 1.94% from two or more races. Hispanic or Latino of any race were 1.48% of the population.

There were 1,488 households, out of which 37.8% had children under the age of 18 living with them, 55.4% were married couples living together, 14.0% had a female householder with no husband present, and 25.8% were non-families. 20.2% of all households were made up of individuals, and 6.7% had someone living alone who was 65 years of age or older. The average household size was 2.67 and the average family size was 3.07.

In the village, the population was spread out, with 27.9% under the age of 18, 8.7% from 18 to 24, 33.8% from 25 to 44, 20.7% from 45 to 64, and 8.9% who were 65 years of age or older. The median age was 33 years. For every 100 females there were 95.8 males. For every 100 females age 18 and over, there were 93.4 males.

The median income for a household in the village was $45,000, and the median income for a family was $47,271. Males had a median income of $35,342 versus $25,342 for females. The per capita income for the village was $17,385. About 5.9% of families and 6.4% of the population were below the poverty line, including 5.9% of those under age 18 and 14.9% of those age 65 or over.

== Government ==
The Village of Obetz’ charter was approved by voters on November 3, 2009, and went into effect on January 1, 2010. This established a Mayor-Council Plan form of government.

== Economy ==
=== Top Employers ===
According to the Village's 2014 Comprehensive Annual Financial Report, the top employers in Obetz are:

#	Employer	Nature of Business	# of employees
1	Zulily, Inc.	Retail	1,075
2	Avnet, Inc.	Manufacturing	1,020
3	United Parcel Service, Inc.	Shipping	1,000
4	Columbus Fair Auto Auction, Inc.	Auto Auction	900
5	Bare Escentuals Beauty, Inc.	Retail	600
6	Luxottica Retail North America, Inc.	Eyeware	425
7	Hamilton Local School District	Education	319
8	Aspen Logistics Inc.	Retail	300
9	Goodyear	Retail	300
10	Art Com, Inc.	Retail	200

== Sports ==
The Ohio Aviators were based in Obetz, Ohio and played in the inaugural 2016 PRO Rugby season.

Obetz is home to the EAS Training Center, the former training ground of the Columbus Crew Soccer Club. The complex includes locker rooms, meeting rooms, classrooms, athletic training and treatment rooms, weight training equipment, and multiple practice fields of varying sizes to support not only the first team that participates in Major League Soccer, but also the various levels of academies under the club as well.

Obetz was also home to the Ohio Machine of Major League Lacrosse. They played their home games at Fortress Obetz. The Ohio Machine were the 2017 Major League Lacrosse National Champions.

== Education ==
=== Primary and secondary schools ===
The Village of Obetz is home to Hamilton Local Schools and Groveport Madison Schools. The majority of Obetz is located in the Hamilton Local School District, and a much smaller portion of Obetz is located in the Groveport Madison School District. Both Hamilton Local Schools and Groveport Madison Schools have rich histories dating back to the mid-1800s.

The Hamilton Local School District includes Hamilton Township High School, Hamilton Middle School, Hamilton Intermediate School, Hamilton Elementary School, Hamilton Preschool, and Hamilton Alternative Academy. Hamilton Local Schools counts its enrollment at more than 3,300 students. This total does not include nearly 170 children that are enrolled in the Hamilton Preschool facility. The Hamilton Alternative Academy, which is a separate school district sponsored by the Hamilton Local School District, currently delivers services to more than 100 students. The Hamilton Local School District has 201 certified staff members, 94 classified employees, eight district administrators, and eight building administrators. Children from the communities of Obetz, Reese, Hamilton Township, Lockbourne, and Shadeville are educated in the Hamilton Local School District. In 2015, Hamilton Township High School earned the nation's highest school honor. On September 29, the United States Secretary of Education, Arne Duncan announced that Hamilton earned the premiere designation of National Blue Ribbon School for 2015. Hamilton Local School District was recently named one of central Ohio's Top Workplaces for the third consecutive year by Columbus CEO magazine. The district is rated as one of the area's best midsize workplaces after an independent study found evidence of strength in leadership, company direction, innovation, and workplace environment.

Groveport Madison School District has one high school (Groveport Madison High School), three middle schools, six elementary schools, and Cruiser Academy Community School. There are special needs Pre-K programs in four of the six elementary buildings, and one elementary has a Head-Start Program for preschoolers. The district also has an Extended Day Program that is offered before and after school. The Groveport Madison School District has 416 certified staff members, 189 classified staff members, and 5,811 students. The district covers approximately 42 square miles.

== Parks and recreation ==
=== Parks ===
There are seven public parks within the Village of Obetz: Dixon Quarry, Memorial Park, Bridlewood Park, McFadyen Park, Lancaster Park, Veterans Park, and Community Center Park, for a total of 136 acres. From fishing to archery or basketball to bocce ball, these parks have a lot to offer. Obetz works to enhance the quality of life for its residents through outgoing efforts toward the preservation/development of indoor and outdoor facilities.

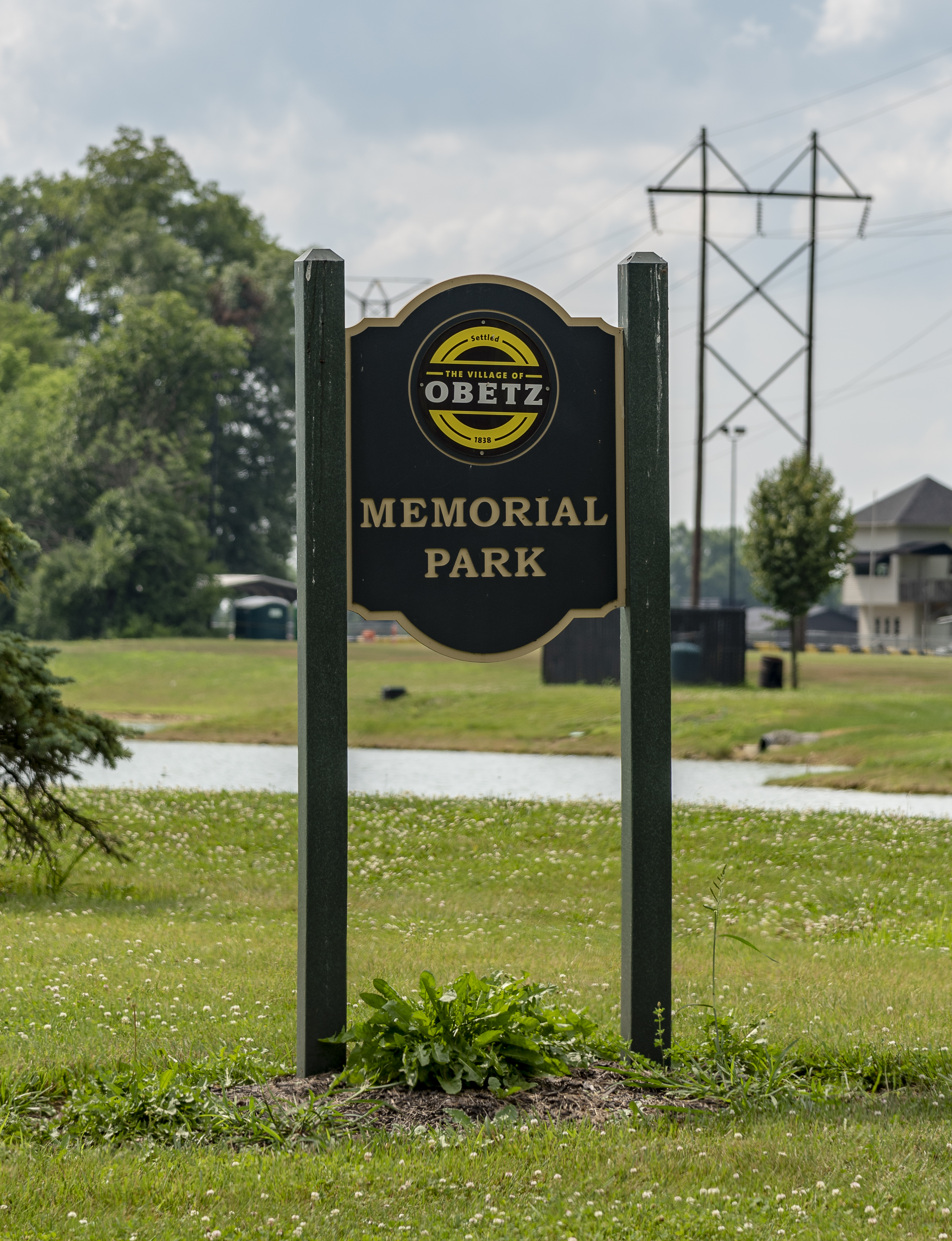
Obetz Memorial Park Sign

Memorial Park stretches between the Obetz Government Center and the Street Department building, which is at the western end of Orchard Lane. The Obetz Athletic Club is located in Memorial Park, and it's also the location of the village's annual Zucchinifest. Memorial Park is also where the Ohio Aviators played their home games.

Veterans Park is a small half-acre park located along Groveport Road next to Lancaster Park. It contains a gazebo and benches. It also has several memorials to Obetz veterans.

The Community Center Park is a three-acre park located at 1650 Obetz Avenue, next to the Community Center. The park contains a tennis court, two basketball courts, playground equipment, spring toys, and swing set. The park also has a shelter house with picnic tables and grills. There is a small paved walking path and benches in the park as well as paved parking area. Dixon Quarry includes a six-acre lake for recreational fishing, an archery range, walking paths, park shelters, fitness trails, and a bike path that connects to the Alum Creek Greenway/Olentangy-Scioto Bike Trail that runs all through central Ohio. The pond has been stocked with Largemouth Bass, Bluegill/Sunfish, Channel Catfish, Black Crappie, White Amurs, and Rainbow Trout.

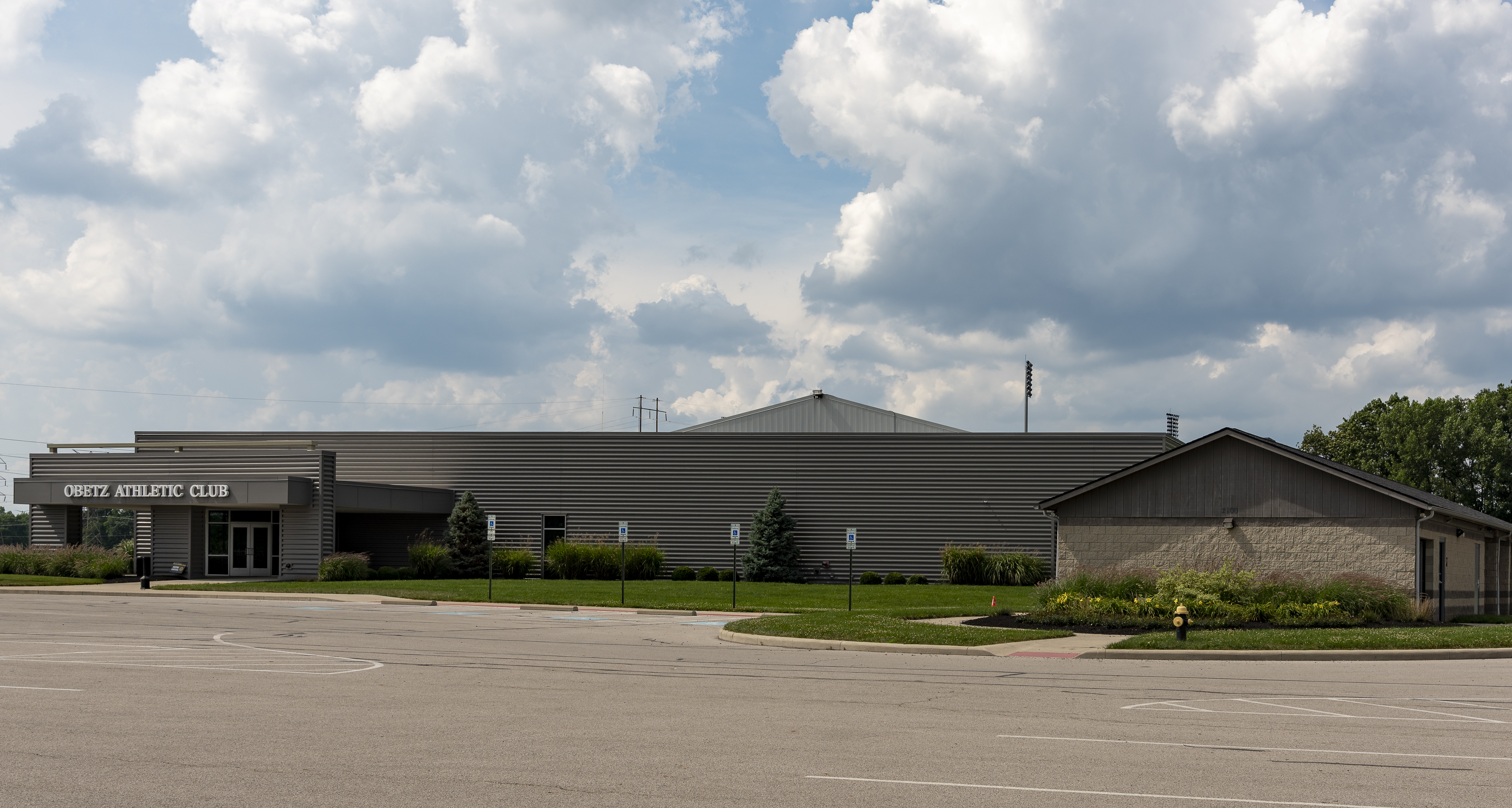
Obetz Athletic Club

=== Obetz Athletic Club ===
The 16,000 square foot Obetz Athletic Club is located in Memorial Park next to the football and baseball fields. In addition to the circuit training, strength training, flexibility training, and cardiovascular training equipment, the OAC offers two golf simulators. Personal fitness training is also available at this facility.

=== Community Center and Conference Center ===
The Community Center is located at 1650 Obetz Avenue. It contains two multi-purpose rooms, a small gymnasium, and a lounge. A park with a shelter and playground equipment is adjacent to the Community Center.

The new 7,300 square foot Obetz Conference Center is located directly next to the Community Center at 1650 Obetz Avenue. The Obetz Conference Center is a multi-purpose space complete with audio visual equipment and a catering kitchen. The facility accommodates up to 250 people.

=== Zucchinifest ===
Obetz is home to the Zucchinifest. The festival is a four-day, family festival held in Memorial Park. Historically, the annual festival occurred on the Thursday, Friday, Saturday, and Sunday before Labor Day weekend. Starting in 2018, the Festival was moved to Labor Day Weekend. There are rides, food, games, and entertainment. The entertainment includes things like concerts, a beer garden, a pageant, a parade, and a car and motorcycle show. Admission to the festival, parking, and concerts are free.

=== Fortress Obetz ===
Fortress Obetz is a 6,500 seat stadium on the site of the former Columbus Motor Speedway. In September 2016, Obetz purchased the Speedway, and has since developed it into a community asset to host concerts, farmers’ markets, trade shows, sporting events, festivals, and other community activities. In its inaugural year (2017), it held events such as the annual Zucchinifest and the 2017 Fashion Meets Music Festival. This 50 acres (20 ha), $15 million project was completed in the fall of 2017. The stadium also serves as the new home for the Ohio Machine of Major League Lacrosse. The stadium's first event was held on May 6, 2017, for the first home game of the Machine, against the Rochester Rattlers.
