= Ohio Aviators (rugby union) =

US rugby union club, based in Obetz, OH

- Full name: Ohio Aviators
- Union: USA Rugby
- Founded: 2016; 10 years ago
- Location: Obetz, Ohio, U.S.
- Ground: Fortress Obetz (Capacity: 6,500)
- Coach: Paule Barford
- Top scorer: Shaun Davies (84)
- Most tries: Spike Davis (14)
- League(s): PRO Rugby (2016); World Tens Series (2020-present)
1st kit	2nd kit

Official website
- www.ohioaviators10s.com

The Ohio Aviators are an American rugby union team that played professionally in the short lived PRO Rugby competition. They are based in the Columbus, Ohio metropolitan area, and played their home games at Memorial Park in Obetz, Ohio. They are now playing in the newly formed World Tens Series.

== History ==
PRO Rugby announced on February 9, 2016, the addition of Columbus, Ohio as the league's third team. The selection of Columbus came as somewhat of a surprise, because the original PRO Rugby announcement in November 2015 did not mention that the competition planned to place a team in the midwest in the inaugural season. Ohio's inaugural season home opener was played on May 1, 2016. PRO Rugby revealed the team's nickname — the Ohio Aviators — on June 6, 2016, a reference to the Wright brothers who were from Ohio.

=== 10's return ===
On September 9, 2020, the Aviators announced on their Instagram page their return to participate in the World Tens Series, occurring from October 24 through November 7, 2020 in Bermuda.

== Stadium ==
The Aviators during the 2016 season played their home games at Memorial Park in Obetz, a suburb of the Columbus metropolitan area. The Aviators planned to move to Fortress Obetz, on the site of the former Columbus Motor Speedway, starting with the 2017 season.

== 2016 roster ==
On December 20, 2016, all PRO Rugby players received notice their contracts will be terminated in 30 days if progress is not made towards resolving disputes between the league and USA Rugby.

The squad for the 2016 PRO Rugby season:

Ohio roster
**Props**: (United States) **Demecus Beach**; (New Zealand) **Jamie Mackintosh** (c); (United States) **Angus MacLellan**; (United States) Anthony Parry; (United States) Derrek Van Klein; **Hookers**: (Ireland) Dylan Fawsitt; (United States) Chris Schade; **Locks**: (Canada) **Kyle Baillie**; (United States) Pierce Dargan; (United States) Ryan McTiernan	**Loose forwards**: (Italy) Filippo Ferrarini; (United States) Matt Hughston^{INJ}; (New Zealand) Chad Joseph; (Chile) Sebastian Kalm; (United States) Peter Malcolm; (United States) Dominic Pezzutti; (South Africa) Riekert Hattingh; **Scrum-halves**: (United States) **Shaun Davies**; (United States) **Robbie Shaw**; (United States) Sam McGuffie; **Fly-halves**: (United States) **JP Eloff**; (New Zealand) Taylor Howden; (United States) Chris Kunkel	**Centers**: (United States) Ryan Cochran; (United States) Ahmad Harajly; (United States) Zach Stryffeler; (United States) **Roland Suniula**; (England) Dominic Waldouck; **Wingers**: (United States) Mason Baum; (United States) Spike Davis; (United States) Alex Elkins; (United States) Shawn Riley; **Fullbacks**: (United States) Allan Hanson; (United States) Zac Mizell
(c) Denotes team captain, **Bold** denotes internationally capped.

=== 2016 coaching staff ===
Position	Name
Head coach	(England) Paule Barford
Assistant coach	(South Africa) Paul Holmes
Assistant coach	(Ireland) Eamonn Hogan

== Current players and staff ==
=== Current roster ===
The squad for the 2020 World Tens Series:

Ohio roster
**Forwards**: (Canada) **Kyle Baillie**; (United States) **Chris Baumann**; (Ireland) **Dylan Fawsitt**; (United States) **Riekert Hattingh**; (Canada) **Eric Howard**; (United States) Spencer Krueger; (United States) **Paddy Ryan**; (United States) John Sullivan; (United States) **Moni Tonga’uiha**; (New Zealand) Brad Tucker	**Backs**: (United States) **Bryce Campbell**; (United States) **Ben Cima**; (United States) **JP Eloff**; (South Africa) Tiaan Loots; (United States) **Will Magie**; (New Zealand) Taylor Howden; (United States) Chris Kunkel; (United States) Shawn Riley; (United States) Christian Rodriguez; (South Africa) Juan-Philip Smith; (United States) **Shalom Suniula**; (United States) Nick Feakes
(c) Denotes team captain, **Bold** denotes internationally capped.

=== Current coaching staff ===
Position	Name
Head coach	Taylor Howden
Assistant coach	Kane Thompson
Manager	Zach Stryffeler
Medical Director	Richard Quincy
Director	Tom Rooney

== World Tens Series ==
=== 2020 ===
==== Bermuda ====
Date	Opponent	Venue	Result
October 25, 2020	Phoenix	Bermuda National Stadium	Won, 26–0
October 25, 2020	(United States) Rhinos	Bermuda National Stadium	Lost, 0–12
October 25, 2020	(England) London Royals	Bermuda National Stadium	Lost, 10–11
October 26, 2020	(Singapore) Asia Pacific Dragons	Bermuda National Stadium	Won, 11–10
October 26, 2020	(United States) Miami Sun	Bermuda National Stadium	Lost, 10–11
November 2, 2020	(United States) Rhinos	Bermuda National Stadium	Won, 11–10
November 2, 2020	Phoenix	Bermuda National Stadium	Won, 22–0
November 2, 2020	(Singapore) Asia Pacific Dragons	Bermuda National Stadium	Lost, 16–20
November 3, 2020	(England) London Royals	Bermuda National Stadium	Lost, 12–13
November 3, 2020	(United States) Miami Sun	Bermuda National Stadium	Lost, 17–17
November 3, 2020	(South Africa) SX10	Bermuda National Stadium	Won, 14–10
November 7, 2020; Quarterfinal	(United States) Miami Sun	Bermuda National Stadium	Won, 26–5
November 7, 2020; Semifinal	(England) London Royals	Bermuda National Stadium	Won, 12–7
November 7, 2020; Final	(South Africa) SX10	Bermuda National Stadium	Lost, 14–21

== Season summaries ==
C=Champions, R=Runners-up, W=Wooden Spoons
Competition	Games Played	Games Won	Games Drawn	Games Lost	Ladder Position	C	R	W	Coach	Details
2016 PRO Rugby season	12	9	0	3	2 / 5				Paule Barford	2016 Ohio Aviators season

=== Leading players ===
Season	Captain	Most tries	Most points
2016	Jamie Mackintosh	Spike Davis (14)	Shaun Davies (84)

=== Coaches ===
Coach	Tenure	Matches	Won	Drawn	Lost	Winning Percentage
Paule Barford	2016	12	9	0	3	75%
Taylor Howden	2020–present	14	7	0	7	50%

== See also ==
- Ohio Aviators (basketball) — defunct ABA basketball team
