= CIBER Field at the University of Denver Soccer Stadium =

College soccer stadium

Denver Soccer Stadium

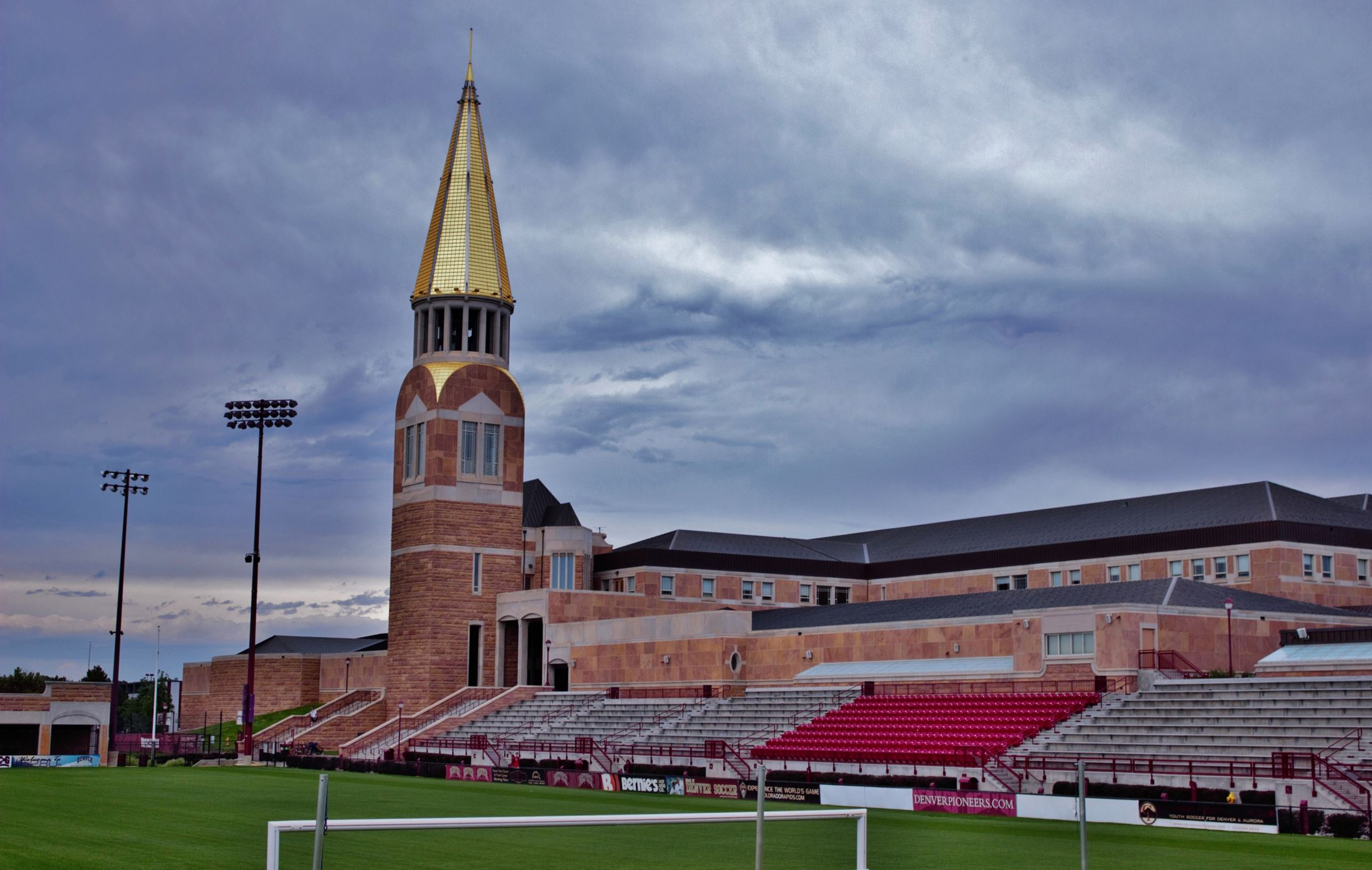
- View of the stadium in 2016
- Interactive map of Denver Soccer Stadium
- Full name: University of Denver Soccer Stadium
- Former names: CIBER Field
- Address: 2201 East Asbury Avenue; Denver, CO; United States
- Coordinates: 39°40′53.2776″N 104°57′47.8038″W
- Owner: University of Denver
- Operator: Univ. of Denver Athletics
- Capacity: 2,000
- Type: Soccer-specific stadium
- Surface: Natural grass

Construction
- Opened: 2009; 17 years ago

Tenants
- Denver Pioneers (NCAA D-I) teams: men's and women's soccer (2009–present); Other teams: Colorado Rapids 2 (MLSNP) (2022–present); Denver Stampede (PRO Rugby) (2016)

Website
- denverpioneers.com/du-soccer-stadium

The University of Denver Soccer Stadium (formerly, "CIBER Field"), is a soccer-specific stadium located in Denver, Colorado. It is home to the Denver Pioneers men's and women's soccer teams of the University of Denver. Other teams that use/have used the stadium for their home games are Colorado Rapids 2 of the MLS Next Pro and PRO Rugby team, Denver Stampede.

== Overview ==
The facility opened in 2009, and seats 2,000 people. The stadium has hosted Pioneers women's soccer NCAA tournament games, and Pioneers men's soccer NCAA tournament games.

== See also ==
- Sports in Denver
