= Memorial Park (Columbus) =

- Interactive map of Memorial Park
- Full name: Memorial Park
- Location: Obetz, Ohio, U.S.
- Coordinates: 39°53′03″N 82°56′13″W

Tenants
- Columbus Crew (MLS) (training facility) (1996-2021); Ohio Aviators (PRO Rugby) (2016)

Memorial Park is located in Obetz, Ohio and stretches between the Obetz Government Center and the Street department building, which is at the western end of Orchard Lane. The Obetz Athletic Club is located in Memorial Park. Memorial Park is also home to the village's annual Zucchinifest.

With a total area of 80 acres, Memorial Park is the largest of Obetz' parks. Memorial has two basketball courts, three soccer fields, a baseball complex, two concession stands, a children's play area with playground equipment and benches, several paved parking areas, and a one-acre fishing pond stocked with Largemouth bass, Bluegill, and Channel catfish. Paved paths run through the park, and dirt nature trails are located in the wooded area around the EAS Training Center.

== EAS Training Center ==
Long the training facility for the Columbus Crew soccer team, EAS Training Center was announced, in February 2016, as the home ground for PRO Rugby team the Ohio Aviators.
