= Denver Stampede =

Defunct US rugby union club, based in Denver, Colorado

- Full name: Denver Stampede
- Union: USA Rugby
- Founded: 2016
- Disbanded: 2017
- Location: Denver, Colorado, U.S.
- Ground: CIBER Field (Capacity: 1,915)
- Coach: Sean O'Leary
- Captain: Pedrie Wannenburg
- League: PRO Rugby
1st kit	2nd kit

The Denver Stampede were an American rugby union team that played in the short lived PRO Rugby competition. The Stampede was one of the five teams that began play in PRO Rugby's 2016 inaugural season. The team played its home matches at the University of Denver's CIBER Field. The team was led by head coach Sean O'Leary and captain Pedrie Wannenburg.

== History ==
Reports began circulating as early as November 2015 that Denver would host a PRO Rugby team when the competition's inaugural season kicked off in April 2016. PRO Rugby officially announced on February 26, 2016 that Denver would be the competition's fifth team. Denver's first officially announced player signing was South African international Pedrie Wannenburg.

Denver hosted Ohio in the first ever PRO Rugby match on April 17, 2016, winning 16–13 at Infinity Park on a late penalty kick from flyhalf Will Magie. PRO Rugby revealed the team's nickname — the Denver Stampede — on June 6, 2016, a reference to Colorado's western theme; this name beat two other final candidates: the Peak (also a mountain western theme) and the Vipers.

On December 20, 2016 all PRO Rugby players received notice their contracts will be terminated in 30 days if progress is not made towards resolving disputes between the league and USA Rugby.

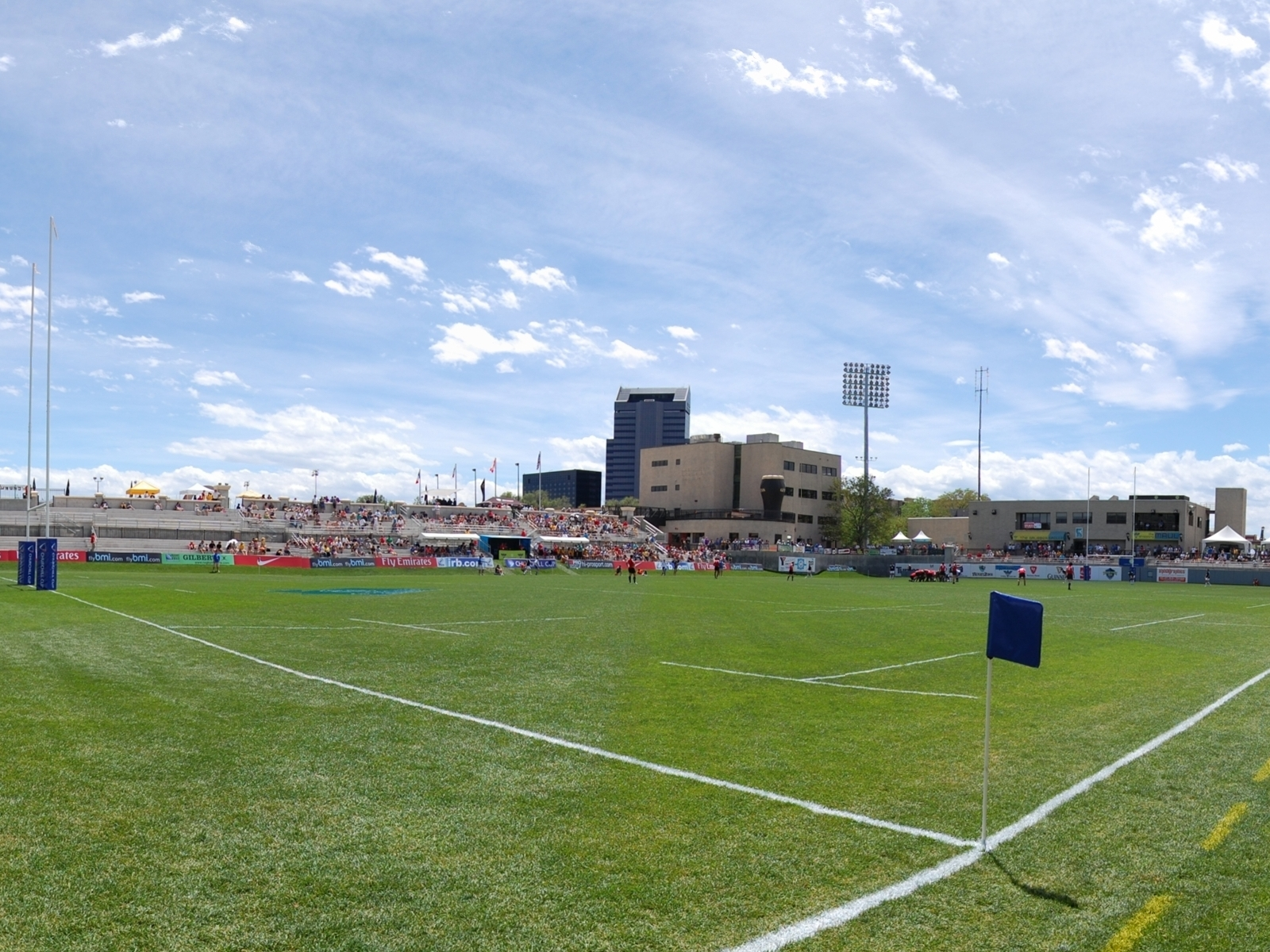
The Stampede played at Infinity Park until May 2016.

== Stadia ==
- Infinity Park (April – May 2016)
- CIBER Field (June – July 2016)

Denver began its inaugural 2016 season playing at Infinity Park. Denver moved to CIBER Field, however, during the 2016 season; this move allowed PRO Rugby to live steam all matches on prorugby.org, and had superior financial considerations.

== Current players and staff ==
=== Current roster ===
The squad for the 2016 PRO Rugby season:

Denver roster
**Props**: (United States) **Chris Baumann**; (Tonga) Soane Leger; (United States) **Ben Tarr**; (Australia) Jake Turnbull; (United States) **Nick Wallace**; (Australia) Luke White; **Hookers**: (United States) **Zach Fenoglio**; **Locks**: (United States) **Ben Landry**; (United States) **Brodie Orth**; (United States) Casey Rock; (United States) Christian Wiessing	**Loose forwards**: (United States) Logan Collins; (United States) **Peter Dahl**; (United States) **Hanco Germishuys**; (United States) Gannon Moore; (United States) Zac Pauga; (South Africa) **Pedrie Wannenburg** (c); (South Africa) Lynton Mare; **Scrum-halves**: (United States) Bobby Impson; (United States) **Niku Kruger**; (United States) **Mose Timoteo**; **Fly-halves**: (United States) Will Magie; (United States) **Ata Malifa**; (South Africa) Armandt Peens	**Centers**: (United States) **Michael Garrity**; (United States) **Chad London**; (United States) Justin Pauga; (United States) Brian Wanless; **Wingers**: (United States) Michael Al-Jiboori; (South Africa) Martin Knoetze; (Australia) **Timana Tahu**; **Fullbacks**: (United States) Dustin Croy; (United States) Maximo de Achaval
(c) Denotes team captain, **Bold** denotes internationally capped.

=== Current coaches ===
Position	Name
Head coach	(Ireland) Sean O'Leary
Assistant coach	(New Zealand) Peter Borlase
Assistant coach	(United States) David Williams
Technical advisor	(South Africa) André Snyman
General manager	Kieran Browner

== Season summaries ==
Season-by-season results
Season	Played	Won	Drawn	Lost	Points for	Points Against	Points Diff	Bonus Points	Points	Position	Details
2016	12	10	0	2	403	273	+130	8	48	1 / 5	2016 Denver Stampede season

=== Leading players ===
Season	Captain	Most tries	Most points
2016	Pedrie Wannenburg	Zach Fenoglio (6)	Will Magie (88)

=== Head coaches ===
Coach	Tenure	Matches	Won	Drawn	Lost	Winning Percentage
Sean O'Leary	2016	12	10	0	2	83.3%

== See also ==
- Sports in Denver
