= Kelston Boys' High School =

School in Auckland, New Zealand

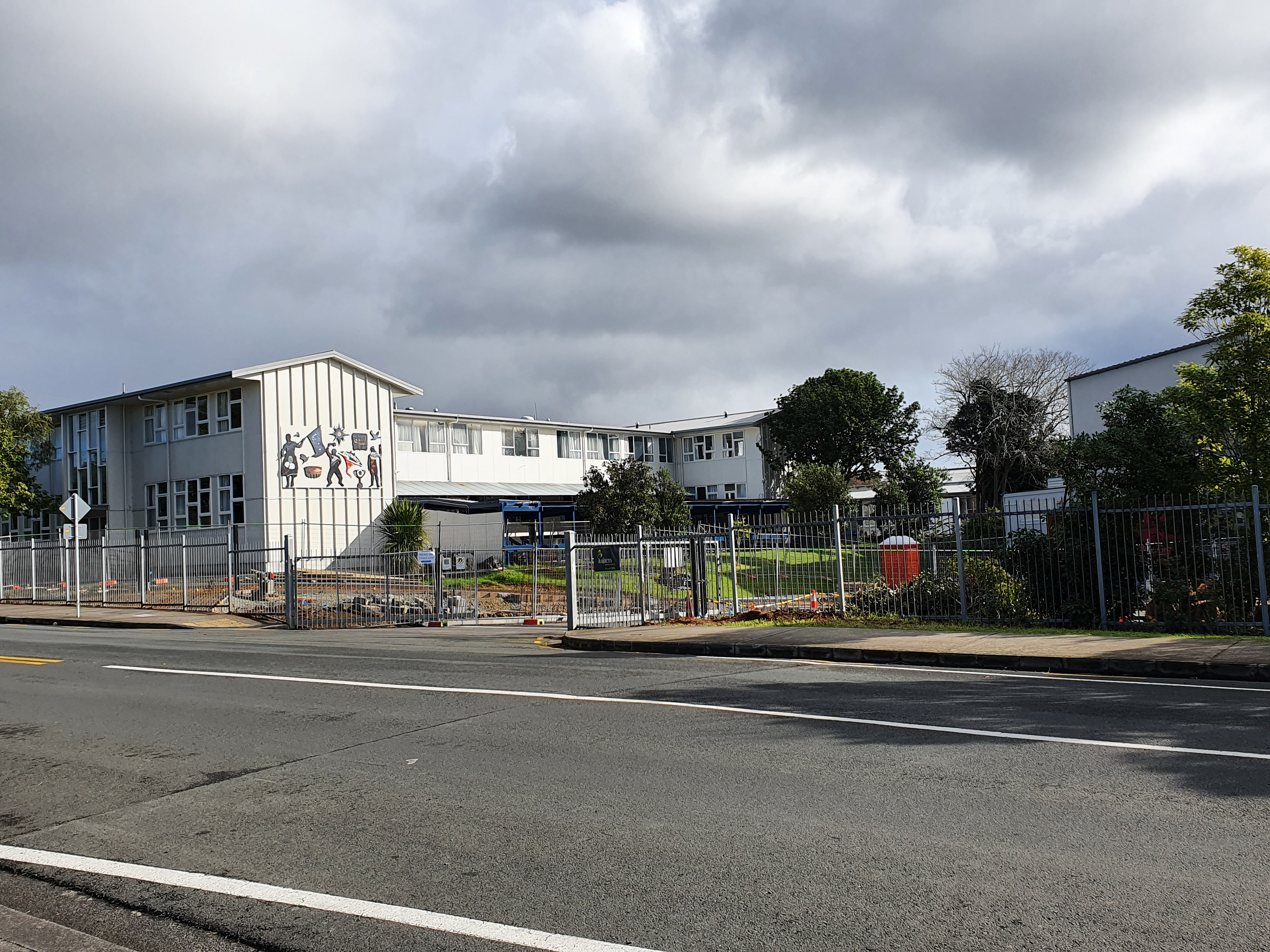

Location
- Archibald Road, Kelston, Auckland; 36.8997°S 174.6656°E

Information
- Type: State single-sex boys secondary (Year 9–13)
- Motto: To wisdom with honour
- Established: 1959; 67 years ago
- Ministry of Education Institution no.: 83
- Principal: Mikaele Taito
- Enrolment: 840 (November 2019)
- Socio-economic decile: 3H
- Newspaper: The Kelstonian
- Website: kbhs.school.nz

Kelston Boys' High School ("KBHS") (Māori: Te Kura Tuaruā o ngā Tamatane o Kerehana) is an all-boys state secondary school in Kelston, a suburb in the Waitakere region of Auckland, New Zealand. It was created in 1959 when the roll of Kelston High School (formed in 1954) became too large for the site on the corner of Archibald and Great North Roads. The boys moved to a new site further down Archibald Road, leaving the original site to be the home of Kelston Girls High School (now Kelston Girls' College).

Although the school is known for the strength of its various sports teams, it has also had some notable achievements in music, dance and theatresports and produced some outstanding academic results.

The school has consistently had strong rugby teams in the top Auckland division, producing several All Blacks and international players. Kelston Boys have won the National top 4 rugby tournament five times (1989, 1995, 1996, 1999, and 2011) sharing the most wins with Wesley College. Kelston Boys have also won the Condor National sevens tournament five times (2002, 2010, 2011, 2012, 2013). The former All Black coach Graham Henry is a former headmaster. The previous principal, who retired in April 2011, Stephen Watt played for the Auckland regional team in the 1970s (where he was affectionately nicknamed 'The Kicking Prop' for his unusual goalkicking prowess). Brian Evans was the former principal; he coached the women's Black Ferns national side to rugby world cup victory in 2010.

Currently, the principal of Kelston Boys' High School is Adeline Blair, who became the first woman to head a state boys' school in Auckland. Adeline Blair has been teaching at Kelston Boys' High School since 2002 but began teaching English for adults in the school's community education division in 1996.

Long-standing Member of Parliament and Speaker of the House of Representatives Jonathan Hunt taught history at Kelston Boys'.

== History ==
In 1954, Kelston High School, a co-educational school, was established at the modern site of Kelston Girls' College. In 1959, the school began a transition to two single-sex schools, with Kelston Boys' High School at a new campus to the south. By 1963, Kelston Boys' was a fully independent school.

== Enrolment ==
As of July 2026, Kelston Boys' High School has a roll of 821 students, of which 203 (24.7%) identify as Māori.

As of 2026, the school has an Equity Index of 505, placing it amongst schools whose students have many socioeconomic barriers to achievement (roughly equivalent to deciles 2 and 3 under the former socio-economic decile system).

== Academia ==
The school offers Māori Bilingual, Samoan Bilingual, and Tongan Bilingual classes for their students.

== Athletics ==
The school provides various sport activities which include:

- Athletics
- Basketball
- Cricket
- Football
- Golf
- Kilikiti
- Lawn Bowls
- Netball
- Rugby
- Rugby League
- Softball
- Tag
- Touch
- Turbo Touch
- Volleyball
- Weightlifting
- Wrestling

In 1987 the school won 9–0 against Sacred Heart in Senior A1 Tennis but lost 5–4 to Auckland Grammar School. The same year, the schools softball league lost only one game in the whole season.

In 1995 the school won in debating against Western Springs AFC but lost to Green Bay.

The same year the school had excelled in soccer by winning 1–0 against Avondale, a 4–4 draw with Mount Albert Grammar School and a 6–2 victory over Mount Roskill Grammar School.

During the 1995 rugby season KBHS had won 27–0 against Papakura and had 98 wins over Rotorua Boys' High School, Te Awamutu and Morrinsville, all of which scored three each. The same year, the school won 17–0 against Saint Kentigern College in a semi-final but then lost 30–10 to Auckland Grammar School.

The school was also a winner in judo at the New Zealand Secondary Schools Championships which were held in Hamilton in August 1995 and won 4 out of 5 games in badminton.

In 1995 the Junior A3 Tennis won all five games.

In 1997 the school's trampoline diver Todd Anderson came in first place with 134.6 points while Bruce Utatao scored 78 in golf. The same year the school lost to Otahuhu College in the touch rugby final but won every other game prior to the loss.

In 2006 the school won every match in football as well as softball but lost two games in that game.

== Principals ==
- Les J. F. Colgan 1954–1965
- Robert M. Bean 1965–1976
- Jim R. Paton 1977–1985
- Graham W. Henry 1985–1996
- Stephen L. Watt 1996–2011
- Brian F. Evans 2011–2018
- Adeline Blair 2018–2025
- Mikaele Taito 2026-Present

== Notable alumni ==
=== The Arts ===
- Ewen Gilmour – comedian (and local body politician)
- Ian Scott – painter
- Sweet & Sour Dance Crew – World champion hip-hop dance crew

=== Business ===
- Graeme Cameron – founder of Canam Construction
- Michael Erceg Ph.D (dec.) – mathematician, businessman

=== Public service ===
- Jack Elder – former MP & Minister of the Crown
- Chris Penk – MP & former Minister of the Crown

=== Sport ===
==== Boxing ====
- Danny Codling – Bronze medalist (welterweight) 2002 Manchester Commonwealth Games

==== Cricket ====
- Michael Bates – Black Caps
- Martin Guptill – Black Caps
- Ronnie Hira – Former Black Caps
- Benjamin Mailata – Samoa, former ICC East Asia-Pacific
- Faasao Mulivai – Samoa, former ICC East Asia-Pacific
- Craig Spearman – Former Black Caps
- Reece Young – Black Caps

==== Football ====
- Jake Butler – All White
- Rodger Gray – NZ Captain
- Danny Hay – former Walsall, Leeds, Kingz and also for Perth Glory and All White
- Tony Laus – former All White
- John Morris – former All White and retired Headmaster at Auckland Grammar School
- Darren Young – former Barnsley FC, Football Kingz, Waterford United, Athlone Town AFC,

==== Rugby League ====
- Patrick Ah Van – New Zealand Warriors
- Josh Aloiai - Manly Sea Eagles and Samoa
- Cliff Beverley - New Zealand Warriors
- Steve Buckingham - New Zealand Warriors
- David Fusitua – New Zealand Warriors
- James Gavet – New Zealand Warriors
- Awen Guttenbeil – Kiwis
- Ben Henry – New Zealand Warriors
- Jacob Laban - New Zealand Warriors
- Epalahame Lauaki – Kiwi, Mate Ma'a Tonga
- Ativalu Lisati - Melbourne Storm
- Tuimoala Lolohea – New Zealand Warriors
- Zyon Maiu'u - New Zealand Warriors
- Brady Malam - New Zealand Warriors
- Duane Mann – former Kiwis Captain
- Suaia Matagi – Toa Samoa
- Jarrod McCracken – former Kiwis captain
- Junior Pauga - Sydney Roosters and Kiwis
- Matt Rua – former Kiwi
- Iosia Soliola – Kiwis and Toa Samoa
- Shalom Suniula – former Junior Kiwi
- Misi Taulapapa – Toa Samoa
- Va'aiga Tuigamala – Toa Samoa
- Bill Tupou – New Zealand Warriors
- Raymond Tuaimalo Vaega – Manly Warringah Sea Eagles
- Naufahu Whyte -Sydney Roosters and Kiwis

==== Rugby Union ====
- Pita Ahki – New Zealand Sevens
- Steven Bates – All Blacks
- Loki Crichton – Manu Samoa
- DJ Forbes – previous All Blacks Sevens captain
- Jason Hewett – All Blacks
- Nathan Hughes – London Wasps, England Rugby
- James Johnston – Manu Samoa
- Sione Lauaki – All Blacks, Pacific Island team member
- Trevor Leota – Manu Samoa, London Wasps (England), Stade Montois (France), Cheetahs (South Africa)
- Willie Losʻe – Tonga
- Kees Meeuws – All Blacks
- Jonathan Meredith – Manu Samoa
- Mils Muliaina – All Blacks
- Apollo Perelini – Manu Samoan, North Harbour (NZ), Sale Sharks (England)
- John Senio – Manu Samoa
- Kevin Senio – All Blacks
- Stephen Shennan – Romania
- Boris Stankovich – London Irish, SC Graulhet, SC Albi, Leicester Tigers, Newport Gwent Dragons
- Andrew Suniula – US rugby
- Roland Suniula – US rugby
- Shalom Suniula – US rugby
- Mose Tuiali'i – All Blacks
- Va'aiga Tuigamala – All Blacks & Manu Samoa
- Anthony Tuitavake – All Blacks
- Sam Tuitupou – All Blacks
- Lolagi Visinia – New Zealand Sevens
- Faletoi Peni – Player for the Moana Pasifika

==== Softball ====
- Lyndon Andrews – Black Sox
- Donny Hale - Black Sox
- Dean Rice – Black Sox

==== Touch Rugby ====
- Troy Nathan
