= 2018 Austin Elite season =

2018 MLR season by club

- Major League Rugby Rank: 5th overall
- 2018 record: Wins: 3; draws: 0; losses: 5

Team information
- Coach: (France) Alain Hyardet
- Captain: Andrew Suniula
- Stadium: Round Rock Multipurpose Complex (3,500)
2019 →

The 2018 Austin Elite season was both the inaugural season for the club and the inaugural season of Major League Rugby in which the club competed. Alain Hyardet was the first coach of the club. Andrew Suniula was the club's first ever captain.

The Elite played their home matchups at Round Rock Multipurpose Complex in Round Rock, Texas.

== Schedule ==
=== Exhibition ===
Date	Opponent	Home/Away	Result
March 25	San Diego Legion°	Home	Lost, 24–32
March 31	at New Orleans Gold°	Away	Lost, 17–48
April 7	New Orleans Gold°	Home	Lost, 10–38

=== Regular season ===
2018 Austin Gilgronis match results
Date	Round	Opponent	Venue	Score
April 21	Round 1	at Glendale Raptors	Infinity Park	L 26–41
April 28	Round 2	at Houston SaberCats	Dyer Stadium	L 38–50
May 3	Round 3	New Orleans Gold	Round Rock Multipurpose Complex	W 30–17
May 11	Round 4	at Utah Warriors	Zions Bank Stadium	L 22–41
May 25	Round 6	San Diego Legion	Round Rock Multipurpose Complex	W 31–5
June 1	Round 7	Utah Warriors	Round Rock Multipurpose Complex	W 41–33
June 8	Round 8	Seattle Seawolves	Round Rock Multipurpose Complex	L 19–20
June 17	Round 9	at San Diego Legion	Torero Stadium	L 10–24

=== Standings ===
Major League Rugby
Pos	Team	P	W	D	L	PF	PA	PD	TB	LB	Pts
1	Glendale Raptors [P]	8	7	0	1	249	165	+84	6	0	34
2	Seattle Seawolves [C]	8	6	0	2	232	188	+44	4	1	29
3	San Diego Legion	8	5	0	3	214	201	+13	3	1	24
4	Utah Warriors	8	3	0	5	269	274	−5	7	3	22
5	Austin Elite	8	3	0	5	224	238	−14	5	1	18
6	New Orleans Gold	8	3	0	5	209	291	−82	4	1	17
7	Houston SaberCats	8	1	0	7	216	256	−40	3	4	11
Updated: June 23, 2018 Source: rugbyarchive.net
Four points for a win, two for a draw, and no points for a bye. One bonus point for scoring four or more tries (TB). One bonus point for losing by seven or less (LB). • Teams 1 to 4 (Green background) at the end of the regular season qualify for the semifinals.
