= 2018–19 European Rugby Challenge Cup =

Second-tier rugby union competition

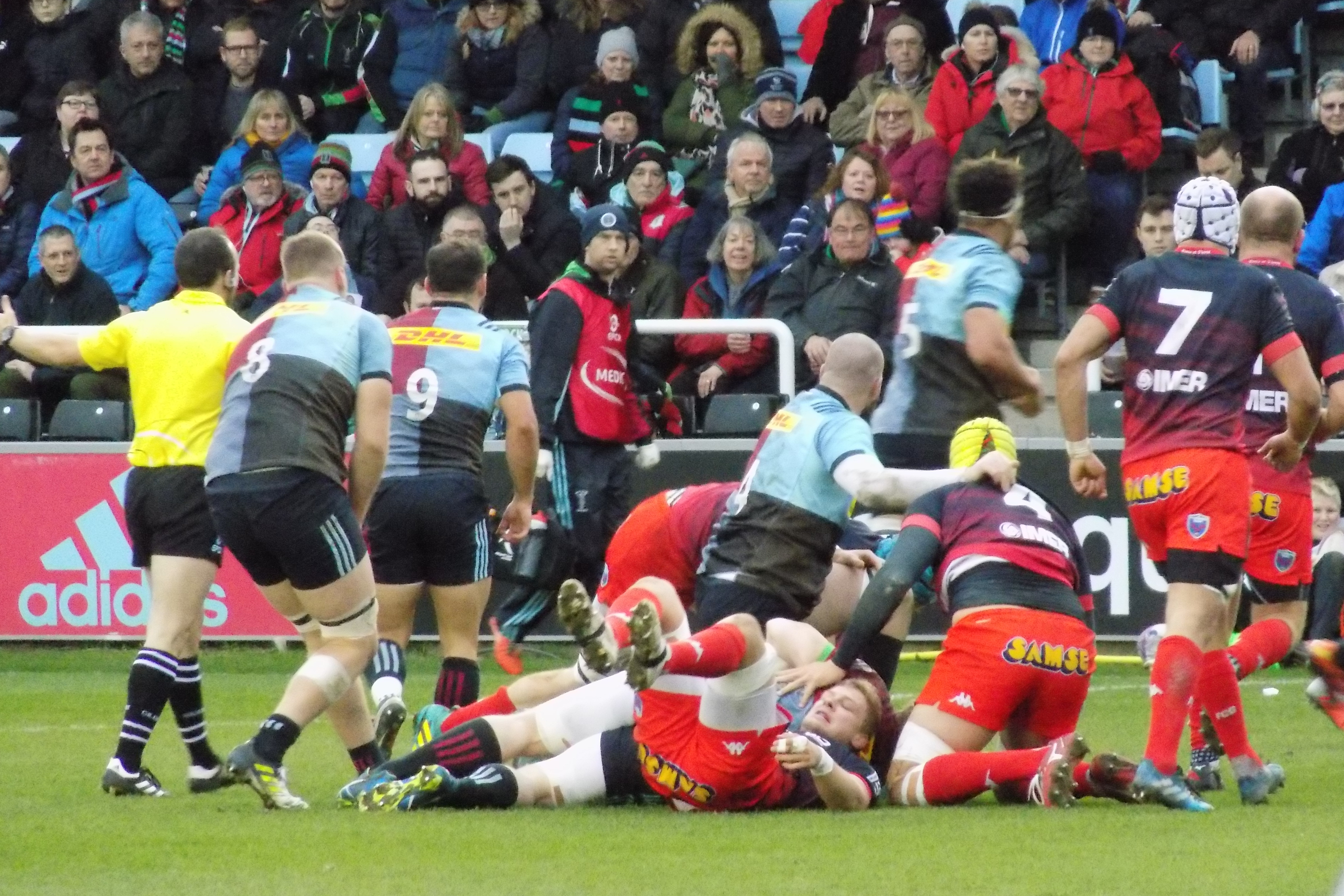

Tournament details
- Countries: England; France; Ireland; Italy; Romania; Russia; Wales
- Tournament format(s): Round-robin and Knockout
- Date: 12 October 2018 – 10 May 2019

Tournament statistics
- Teams: 20
- Matches played: 66
- Attendance: 510,167 (7,730 per match)
- Highest attendance: 28,438; Clermont v La Rochelle (Final); 10 May 2019
- Lowest attendance: 100; Enisei-STM v Bristol Bears; 12 January 2019
- Tries scored: 474 (7.18 per match)
- Top point scorer(s): (New Zealand) Ihaia West (La Rochelle) (64 points)
- Top try scorer(s): (Australia) Peter Betham (Clermont) (10 tries)

Final
- Venue: St James' Park, Newcastle upon Tyne
- Champions: (France) Clermont (3rd title)
- Runners-up: (France) La Rochelle

The 2018–19 European Rugby Challenge Cup is the fifth edition of the European Rugby Challenge Cup, an annual second-tier rugby union competition for professional clubs. Including the predecessor competition, the original European Challenge Cup, this is the 23rd edition of European club rugby's second-tier competition. Clubs from five of the nations that participate in the Six Nations Championship (Scotland being the only exception), along with club-sides from Romania and Russia, are competing.

The first round of the group stage began on 12 October 2018, and the competition will end with the final on 10 May 2019 in Newcastle upon Tyne, United Kingdom. This will be the second time the final will be held in England in the era of the current Challenge Cup, and the 12th including finals of the original Challenge Cup.

== Teams ==
A total of 20 teams qualified for the 2018–19 European Rugby Challenge Cup; 18 qualified from across the Gallagher Premiership, Guinness Pro14 and Top 14, as a direct result of their domestic league performance, with two qualifying through the Continental Shield competition. Subject to the allocation of the 20th place in the 2018–19 Champions Cup as per EPCR rules, the distribution of teams was:

- England: five teams
  - Any teams finishing between 8th and 11th position in the Gallagher Premiership (Note: The English league was sponsored by Aviva during the 2017–18 season.)
  - The champion of the Greene King IPA Championship
- France: eight teams
  - Any teams finishing between 7th and 12th position in the Top 14
  - The champion from the Pro D2
  - The winner of the promotion-relegation play-off between the team in 13th position in the Top 14 and the runner-up of the Pro D2
- Ireland, Italy, Scotland and Wales: five teams
  - Any teams, excluding the South African teams, that did not qualify for the Champions Cup, through the Guinness Pro14
  - No team from Scotland ultimately participated, as Edinburgh and Glasgow Warriors qualified for the 2018–19 Champions Cup.
- Romania: one team
  - One team qualified through the 2017–18 Continental Shield.
- Russia: one team
  - One team qualified through the 2017–18 Continental Shield.

The following clubs qualified for the Challenge Cup.

Gallagher Premiership	Top 14	Pro14			Continental Shield	
England	France	Ireland	Italy	Wales	Russia	Romania
Bristol Bears; Harlequins; Northampton Saints; Sale Sharks; Worcester Warriors	Agen; Bordeaux; Clermont; Grenoble; La Rochelle; Pau; Perpignan; Stade Français	Connacht	Benetton; Zebre	Dragons; Ospreys	Enisei-STM	Timișoara Saracens

=== Qualifying competition – European Rugby Continental Shield ===
The qualification tournament was reformatted as a competition in its own right, the European Rugby Continental Shield, in 2017. Eight teams were split into two pools of four to compete in the pool stage of the European Rugby Continental Shield. Each team played the four teams in the other pool once. The winner of each pool then played-off against the runner-up of the other pool. The winners of these two qualifying play-offs played each other in a two-legged play-off for a place in the Challenge Cup.

The two Russian teams who had competed in the 2017–18 tournament played each other in a two-legged qualifying play-off for a place in the Challenge Cup. The winners of the two qualifying play-offs, having both qualified for the Challenge Cup, then played each other in the European Rugby Continental Shield final in May 2018.

==== Pool play-offs ====
Team 1	Agg.	Team 2	1st leg	2nd leg
Batumi (Georgia (country))	18–32	(Romania) Timișoara Saracens	6–11	12–21
Heidelberger RK (Germany)	51–42	(Italy) Calvisano	34–29	17–13

==== Qualifying play-offs ====
Team 1	Agg.	Team 2	1st leg	2nd leg
Enisei-STM (Russia)	74–48	(Russia) Krasny Yar	47–22	27–26
Timișoara Saracens (Romania)	41–47	(Germany) Heidelberger RK	26–20	15–27

==== Continental Shield Final ====
12 May 2018
12:00

Enisei-STM (Russia)	24 – 20	(Germany) Heidelberger RK

Campos Deportivos de Fadura, Getxo, Biscay

=== Ineligible teams ===
Heidelberger RK were due to become the first German club to take part in either of the two major European rugby union competitions after qualification from the 2017–18 European Rugby Continental Shield. However, they were ruled ineligible by EPC Rugby due to their primary financial backer, Hans-Peter Wild, also being the majority shareholder in Stade Français and therefore being in a position to influence two teams in the competition.

Timișoara Saracens, who had been eliminated by Heidelberger RK at the Continental Shield semi-final stage (effectively the Challenge Cup play-off) were confirmed as their replacement on 11 June 2018.

=== Team details ===
Below is the list of coaches, captain and stadiums with their method of qualification for each team.

Note: Placing shown in brackets, denotes standing at the end of the regular season for their respective leagues, with their end of season positioning shown through CH for Champions, RU for Runner-up, SF for losing Semi-finalist and QF for losing Quarter-finalist.

Team	Coach / Director of Rugby	Captain	Stadium	Capacity	Method of Qualification
(France) Agen	(Argentina) Mauricio Reggiardo (France) Stéphane Prosper		Stade Armandie	14,000	Top 14 8th-12th (11th)
(Italy) Benetton	(New Zealand) Kieran Crowley	(Italy) Dean Budd	Stadio Comunale di Monigo	6,700	Pro14 (5B)
(France) Bordeaux Bègles	(England) Rory Teague	(France) Clément Maynadier	Stade Chaban-Delmas	34,694	Top 14 8th-12th (10th)
(England) Bristol Bears	(Samoa) Pat Lam	N/A (Leadership Group)	Ashton Gate	27,000	RFU Championship Champion
(France) Clermont	(France) Franck Azéma	(France) Morgan Parra	Stade Marcel-Michelin	19,022	Top 14 8th-12th (9th)
(Ireland) Connacht	(Australia) Andy Friend	(Australia) Jarrad Butler	Galway Sportsgrounds	8,129	Pro14 (6A)
(Wales) Dragons	(Ireland) Bernard Jackman	(Wales) Cory Hill	Rodney Parade	8,700	Pro14 (6B)
(Russia) Enisei-STM	(Russia) Alexander Pervukhin	(Latvia) Uldis Saulite	Krasny Yar Stadium; Sochi Central Stadium	3,600; 10,200	Continental Shield Champions
(France) Grenoble	(France) Stéphane Glas (South Africa) Dewald Senekal	(France) Antonin Berruyer	Stade des Alpes	20,068	Pro D2 play-off winner
(England) Harlequins	(England) Paul Gustard (Australia) Billy Millard	(Australia) James Horwill (England) Chris Robshaw	Twickenham Stoop	14,800	Premiership 8th-11th (10th)
(France) La Rochelle	(France) Xavier Garbajosa (France) Grégory Patat	(New Zealand) Victor Vito	Stade Marcel-Deflandre	16,000	Top 14 8th-12th (7th)
(England) Northampton Saints	(New Zealand) Chris Boyd	(England) Dylan Hartley (England) Alex Waller	Franklin's Gardens	15,249	Premiership 8th-11th (9th)
(Wales) Ospreys	(Ireland) Allen Clarke	(Wales) Justin Tipuric	Liberty Stadium	20,827	Pro14 (5A) (Note: Ospreys lost the 7th-place play-off to Ulster, missing out on qualification for the European Rugby Champions Cup.)
(France) Pau	(New Zealand) Simon Mannix	(France) Julien Tomas	Stade du Hameau	18,324	Top 14 8th-12th (8th)
(France) Perpignan	(France) Alain Hyardet (France) Grégory Patat (France) François Gelez	(France) Guillaume Vilaceca	Stade Aimé Giral	14,593	Pro D2 Champion
(England) Sale Sharks	(England) Steve Diamond	(South Africa) Jono Ross	AJ Bell Stadium	12,000	Premiership 8th-11th (8th)
(France) Stade Français	(South Africa) Heyneke Meyer	(Italy) Sergio Parisse	Stade Jean-Bouin	20,000	Top 14 (12th)
(Romania) Timișoara Saracens	(South Africa) Chester Williams	(Romania) Vasile Rus	Stadionul Dan Păltinișanu	32,972	Continental Shield (3rd) (Note: Timișoara Saracens qualified for the European Challenge Cup after runners-up Heidelberger RK were disqualified due to owner Hans-Peter Wild also being a primary shareholder at Stade Français, leading to a potential conflict of interest if these teams were to meet in this season's competition.)
(England) Worcester Warriors	(South Africa) Alan Solomons	(South Africa) GJ van Velze	Sixways Stadium	11,499	Premiership 8th-11th (11th)
(Italy) Zebre	(Ireland) Michael Bradley	(Italy) Tommaso Castello	Stadio Sergio Lanfranchi	5,000	Pro14 (7A)

== Seeding ==
The 20 competing teams were seeded and split into four tiers; seeding was based on performance in their respective domestic leagues. Where promotion and relegation is in effect in a league, the promoted team was seeded last, or (if multiple teams are promoted) by performance in the lower competition.

Rank	Top 14	Premiership	Pro 14	Continental Shield
1	(France) La Rochelle	(England) Sale Sharks	(Italy) Benetton	(Russia) Enisei-STM
2	(France) Pau	(England) Northampton Saints	(Wales) Ospreys	(Romania) Timișoara Saracens
3	(France) Clermont	(England) Harlequins	(Ireland) Connacht	
4	(France) Bordeaux	(England) Worcester Warriors	(Italy) Zebre	
5	(France) Agen	(England) Bristol Bears	(Wales) Dragons	
6	(France) Stade Français			
7	(France) Perpignan			
8	(France) Grenoble			

Teams are taken from a league in order of rank and put into a tier. A draw is used to allocate two second seeds to Tier 1; the remaining team goes into Tier 2. This allocation indirectly determines which fourth-seeded team entered Tier 2, while the others enter Tier 3.

Given the nature of the Continental Shield — a competition including developing rugby nations and Italian clubs not competing in the Pro14 — the two qualifiers from that competition were automatically included in Tier 4 and are seeded equally, despite officially being ranked 1 and 2 from that competition.

The brackets show each team's seeding and their league (for example, 1 Top 14 indicates the team was seeded 1st from the Top 14).

Tier 1	(England) Sale Sharks (1 Prem)	(Italy) Benetton (1 Pro14)	(France) La Rochelle (1 Top 14)	(France) Pau (2 Top 14)	(England) Northampton Saints (2 Prem)
Tier 2	(Wales) Ospreys (2 Pro14)	(England) Harlequins (3 Prem)	(Ireland) Connacht (3 Pro14)	(France) Clermont (3 Top 14)	(Italy) Zebre (4 Pro14)
Tier 3	(England) Worcester Warriors (4 Prem)	(France) Bordeaux (4 Top 14)	(England) Bristol Bears (5 Prem)	(Wales) Dragons (5 Pro14)	(France) Agen (5 Top 14)
Tier 4	(France) Stade Français (6 Top 14)	(France) Perpignan (7 Top 14)	(France) Grenoble (8 Top 14)	(Russia) Enisei-STM (CS 1)	(Romania) Timișoara Saracens (CS 2)

== Pool stage ==
Locations of teams of the 2018–19 European Rugby Challenge Cup group stage in Europe.
Brown: Pool 1; Red: Pool 2; Orange: Pool 3; Yellow: Pool 4; Green: Pool 5.

The draw took place on 20 June 2018 in the Olympic Museum, Lausanne, Switzerland.

Teams in the same pool play each other twice, both at home and away in the group stage started in October 2018, and continues through to January 2019. The pool winners and three best runners-up progressed to the quarter-finals.

Teams are awarded competition points, based on match result. Teams receive four points for a win, two points for a draw, one attacking bonus point for scoring four or more tries in a match and one defensive bonus point for losing a match by seven points or fewer.

In the event of a tie between two or more teams, the following tie-breakers will be used, as directed by EPCR:

1. Where teams have played each other
  1. The club with the greater number of competition points from only matches involving tied teams.
  2. If equal, the club with the best aggregate points difference from those matches.
  3. If equal, the club that scored the most tries in those matches.
2. Where teams remain tied and/or have not played each other in the competition (i.e. are from different pools)
  1. The club with the best aggregate points difference from the pool stage.
  2. If equal, the club that scored the most tries in the pool stage.
  3. If equal, the club with the fewest players suspended in the pool stage.
  4. If equal, the drawing of lots will determine a club's ranking.

Key to colours
Winner of each pool, advance to quarter-finals.
Three highest-scoring second-place teams advance to quarter-finals.

=== Pool 1 ===
Pos	Team	Pld	W	D	L	PF	PA	PD	TF	TA	TB	LB	Pts
1	(France) Clermont (1)	6	6	0	0	304	117	+187	44	16	6	0	30
2	(England) Northampton Saints (8)	6	4	0	2	282	127	+155	51	18	5	0	21
3	(Wales) Dragons	6	2	0	4	179	201	−22	26	29	2	0	10
4	(Romania) Timișoara Saracens	6	0	0	6	49	369	−320	6	51	0	0	0

Source: espn.co.uk

=== Pool 2 ===
Pos	Team	Pld	W	D	L	PF	PA	PD	TF	TA	TB	LB	Pts
1	(England) Worcester Warriors (4)	6	5	0	1	150	125	+25	19	16	2	0	22
2	(Wales) Ospreys	6	2	0	4	141	105	+36	18	12	2	3	13
3	(France) Pau	6	3	0	3	89	127	−38	12	16	1	0	13
4	(France) Stade Français	6	2	0	4	140	163	−23	16	21	2	2	12

Source: espn.co.uk

=== Pool 3 ===
Pos	Team	Pld	W	D	L	PF	PA	PD	TF	TA	TB	LB	Pts
1	(England) Sale Sharks (3)	6	4	0	2	196	108	+88	27	12	4	2	22
2	(Ireland) Connacht (6)	6	5	0	1	146	120	+26	19	14	2	0	22
3	(France) Bordeaux Bègles	6	2	1	3	137	171	−34	17	23	1	1	12
4	(France) Perpignan	6	0	1	5	117	197	−80	13	27	0	1	3

Source: espn.co.uk

=== Pool 4 ===
Pos	Team	Pld	W	D	L	PF	PA	PD	TF	TA	TB	LB	Pts
1	(France) La Rochelle (2)	6	5	0	1	238	104	+134	32	15	4	0	24
2	(England) Bristol Bears (7)	6	4	0	2	267	108	+159	42	13	4	1	21
3	(Italy) Zebre	6	3	0	3	153	142	+11	21	18	2	0	14
4	(Russia) Enisei-STM	6	0	0	6	103	407	−304	14	63	1	0	1

Source: espn.co.uk

=== Pool 5 ===
Pos	Team	Pld	W	D	L	PF	PA	PD	TF	TA	TB	LB	Pts
1	(England) Harlequins (5)	6	4	0	2	179	113	+66	23	13	3	2	21
2	(Italy) Benetton	6	4	0	2	171	106	+65	23	12	3	1	20
3	(France) Grenoble	6	2	0	4	92	159	−67	11	21	0	1	9
4	(France) Agen	6	2	0	4	112	176	−64	15	26	0	1	9

Source: espn.co.uk

=== Ranking of pool leaders and runners-up ===
Rank	Pool Leaders	Pts	Diff	TF
1	(France) Clermont	30	187	44
2	(France) La Rochelle	24	134	32
3	(England) Sale Sharks	22	88	27
4	(England) Worcester Warriors	22	25	19
5	(England) Harlequins	21	66	23
Rank	Pool Runners–up	Pts	Diff	TF
6	(Ireland) Connacht	22	26	19
7	(England) Bristol Bears	21	159	42
8	(England) Northampton Saints	21	155	42
9	(Italy) Benetton	20	65	23
10	(Wales) Ospreys	13	36	18

== Knock-out stage ==
=== Format ===
The eight qualifiers are ranked according to their performance in the pool stage and compete in the quarter-finals which will be held on the weekend of 28–31 March 2019. The four top teams will host the quarter-finals against the four lower teams in a 1v8, 2v7, 3v6 and 4v5 format.

The semi-finals will be played on the weekend of 19–21 April 2019. As in recent seasons, a fixed semi-final bracket is set in advance. However, beginning this season the higher-seeded team will host each semi-final regardless of whether they won their quarter-final at home or on the road.

The winners of the semi-finals will contest the final, at St James' Park, on 10 May 2019.

=== Bracket ===
Quarter-finals
1	(France) Clermont	61
8	(England) Northampton Saints	38
4	(England) Worcester Warriors	16
5	(England) Harlequins	18
2	(France) La Rochelle	39
7	(England) Bristol Bears	15
3	(England) Sale Sharks	20
6	(Ireland) Connacht	10

Semi-finals
1	(France) Clermont	32
5	(England) Harlequins	27
2	(France) La Rochelle	24
3	(England) Sale Sharks	20

Final
1	(France) Clermont	36
2	(France) La Rochelle	16

=== Quarter-finals ===
29 March 2019
19:45 GMT UTC+0

Sale Sharks (England) (3)	20–10	(6) (Ireland) Connacht
Try: McGuigan 9' c Solomona 14' c Con: MacGinty (2/2) 10', 16'; Pen: MacGinty (2/2) 28', 33'	Report	Try: Godwin 67' c Con: Leader (1/1) 68'; Pen: Carty (1/2) 7'; Leader (0/1)

AJ Bell Stadium
Attendance: 4,649
Referee: Mathieu Raynal (FFR)

30 March 2019
20:15 GMT UTC+0

Worcester Warriors (England) (4)	16–18	(5) (England) Harlequins
Try: Heem 23' m Howe 46' m Con: Weir (0/2); Pen: Weir (2/3) 60', 74'	Report	Try: Murley 16' m Tapuai 67' c Con: Smith (0/1); Catrakilis (1/1) 69'; Pen: Smith (1/1) 36'; Catrakilis (1/1) 75'

Sixways Stadium
Attendance: 6,349
Referee: Alexandre Ruiz (FFR)

31 March 2019
13:45 CEST UTC+2

La Rochelle (France) (2)	39–15	(7) (England) Bristol Bears
Try: Alldritt 12' c Penalty try 20'; Doumayrou 26' c Liebenberg 40' m Rattez 71' c Con: West (2/3) 13', 27'; Lamb (1/1) 72'; Pen: West (2/2) 7', 52'	Report	Try: Luatua 35' c O'Conor 79' m Con: Madigan (1/1) 36'; Sheedy (0/1); Pen: Madigan (1/1) 17'

Stade Marcel-Deflandre
Attendance: 15,000
Referee: John Lacey (IRFU)

31 March 2019
19:00 CEST UTC+2

Clermont (France) (1)	61–38	(8) (England) Northampton Saints
Try: Betham (3) 19' m, 48' m, 76' c Penaud (3) 25' c, 57' c, 75' c Penalty try 27'; Nanai-Williams 71' c Con: Parra (1/3) 26'; Laidlaw (4/4) 58', 72', 76', 77'; Pen: Parra (2/2) 1', 43'; Laidlaw (1/1) 69'	Report	Try: Tuala 55' c Burrell 61' c Mitchell 63' c Hutchinson 65' c Moon 78' c Con: Hutchinson (5/5) 56', 61', 63', 66', 79'; Pen: Biggar (1/1) 9'

Stade Marcel-Michelin
Attendance: 15,399
Referee: George Clancy (IRFU)

=== Semi-finals ===
20 April 2019
18:30 CEST UTC+2

La Rochelle (France) (2)	24–20	(3) (England) Sale Sharks
Try: Penalty try 23'; Murimurivalu 25' c Alldritt 50' c Con: West (2/2) 27', 52'; Pen: West (1/2) 16'	Report	Try: Penalty try 13'; Ashton 33' c Con: MacGinty (1/1) 34'; Pen: MacGinty (2/3) 20', 68'

Stade Marcel-Deflandre
Attendance: 16,000
Referee: Nigel Owens (WRU)

20 April 2019
21:00 CEST UTC+2

Clermont (France) (1)	32–27	(5) (England) Harlequins
Try: Lee 31' c Penaud 35' c Con: Parra (2/2) 33', 36'; Pen: Parra (4/4) 28', 40'+3, 47', 54'; Drop: Lopez (2/2) 9', 25'	Report	Try: Brown 38' m Robshaw 57' c Lang 65' c Dombrandt 79' m Con: Smith (2/4) 58', 66'; Pen: Smith (1/1) 12'

Stade Marcel-Michelin
Attendance: 17,923
Referee: John Lacey (IRFU)

=== Final ===
10 May 2019
19:45 BST UTC+1

Clermont (France) (1)	36–16	(2) (France) La Rochelle
Try: Penaud 30' c Lee 60' c Fofana 72' c Con: Laidlaw (3/3) 31', 61', 72'; Pen: Parra (1/1) 13'; Laidlaw (4/4) 23', 52', 57', 80'	Report	Try: Atonio 65'; Con: West (1/1) 66'; Pen: West (3/4) 25', 35', 48'

St James' Park
Attendance: 28,438
Referee: Wayne Barnes (RFU)

== Attendances ==
- Does not include the attendance at the final as it takes place at a neutral venue.

Club	Home Games	Total	Average	Highest	Lowest	% Capacity
(France) Agen	3	7,297	2,432	3,187	2,020	17%
(Italy) Benetton	3	9,980	3,327	4,600	2,480	50%
(France) Bordeaux Bègles	3	41,628	13,876	17,129	11,899	40%
(England) Bristol Bears	3	25,424	8,475	8,852	7,983	31%
(France) Clermont	5	80,761	16,152	17,923	15,399	85%
(Ireland) Connacht	3	16,118	5,373	6,229	4,878	66%
(Wales) Dragons	3	13,506	4,502	4,600	4,306	52%
(Russia) Enisei-ETM	3	3,300	1,100	2,700	100	27%
(France) Grenoble	3	22,597	7,532	7,897	6,970	38%
(England) Harlequins	3	25,609	8,536	9,532	6,838	58%
(France) La Rochelle	5	76,000	15,200	16,000	15,000	95%
(England) Northampton Saints	3	34,088	11,363	11,739	10,637	75%
(Wales) Ospreys	3	18,149	6,050	6,184	5,893	29%
(France) Pau	3	20,403	6,801	9,730	4,524	37%
(France) Perpignan	3	16,870	5,623	8,038	3,666	39%
(England) Sale Sharks	4	16,306	4,077	4,649	3,049	34%
(France) Stade Francais	3	17,670	5,890	6,880	4,250	29%
(Romania) Timișoara Saracens (Note: Timișoara Saracens only played 2 home games as their home game against Northampton Saints on 15 December 2018 was cancelled due to poor weather.)	2	3,000	1,500	2,000	1,000	5%
(England) Worcester Warriors	4	26,923	6,731	6,978	6,349	59%
(Italy) Zebre	3	6,100	2,033	2,800	1,500	41%

== Individual statistics ==
- Points scorers includes tries as well as conversions, penalties and drop goals. Appearance figures also include coming on as substitutes (unused substitutes not included).

=== Top points scorers ===
Rank	Player	Team	Appearances	Points
1	(New Zealand) Ihaia West	La Rochelle	8	64
2	(Italy) Carlo Canna	Zebre	6	59
2	(England) Marcus Smith	Harlequins	8	59
3	(England) Callum Sheedy	Bristol Bears	7	57
4	(Scotland) Greig Laidlaw	Clermont	7	56
5	(Australia) Peter Betham	Clermont	8	50
6	(France) Maxime Lafage	La Rochelle	5	49
7	(South Africa) Faf de Klerk	Sale Sharks	7	45
8	(England) Chris Ashton	Sale Sharks	6	40
9	(Argentina) Patricio Fernandez	Clermont	5	39

=== Top try scorers ===
Rank	Player	Team	Appearances	Tries
1	(Australia) Peter Betham	Clermont	8	10
2	(England) Chris Ashton	Sale Sharks	6	8
3	(England) Alex Mitchell	Northampton Saints	7	7
4	(England) Andy Uren	Bristol Bears	6	6
4	(Australia) Tom Pincus	Bristol Bears	7	6
5	(England) Ollie Sleightholme	Northampton Saints	2	5
5	(England) Ryan Edwards	Bristol Bears	3	5
5	(Fiji) Iliesa Ratuva Tavuyara	Benetton	4	5
5	(Fiji) Peceli Yato	Clermont	5	5
5	(Ireland) Kyle Godwin	Connacht	6	5
5	(England) Tom Howe	Worcester Warriors	6	5
5	(France) Damian Penaud	Clermont	6	5
5	(Fiji) Apisai Naqalevu	Clermont	7	5
5	(France) Grégory Alldritt	La Rochelle	8	5

== Season records ==
=== Team ===
Largest home win — 108 points

111–3 Northampton Saints at home to Timișoara Saracens on 18 January 2019

Largest away win — 61 points

82–21 La Rochelle away to Enisei-STM on 13 October 2018

Most points scored — 111 points

111–3 Northampton Saints at home to Timișoara Saracens on 18 January 2019

Most tries in a match — 17

Bristol Bears at home Enisei-STM on 19 January 2019

Most conversions in a match — 13

Northampton Saints at home to Timișoara Saracens on 18 January 2019

Most penalties in a match — 5

La Rochelle away to Zebre on 19 January 2018

Most drop goals in a match — 2

Clermont at home to Harlequins on 20 April 2019

=== Player ===
Most points in a match — 25 (2)

(France) Maxime Lafage for La Rochelle away to Enisei-STM on 13 October 2018
(England) Andy Uren for Bristol Bears at home Enisei-STM on 19 January 2019

Most tries in a match — 5

(England) Andy Uren for Bristol Bears at home Enisei-STM on 19 January 2019

Most conversions in a match — 11 (2)

(England) James Grayson for Northampton Saints at home to Timișoara Saracens on 18 January 2019
(England) Callum Sheedy for Bristol Bears at home Enisei-STM on 19 January 2019

Most penalties in a match — 5

(New Zealand) Ihaia West for La Rochelle away to Zebre on 19 January 2019

Most drop goals in a match — 2

(France) Camille Lopez for Clermont at home to Harlequins on 20 April 2019

=== Attendances ===
Highest — 28,438

Clermont versus La Rochelle on 10 May 2019 (Final)

Lowest — 100

Enisei-STM at home to Bristol Bears on 12 January 2019

Highest average attendance — 16,152

Clermont

Lowest average attendance — 1,100

Enisei-STM

== See also ==
- 2018–19 European Rugby Champions Cup
- 2018–19 European Rugby Continental Shield
