= Senio (disambiguation) =

The Senio is a river in Italy. Senio may also refer to:

== People ==
- Senio Kelemete (born 1990), American football player
- Senio Toleafoa (born 1993), Australian rugby union player
- John Senio (born 1982), Samoan rugby union player
- Kevin Senio (born 1978), New Zealand rugby union player

== Other uses ==
- Palazzuolo sul Senio, commune in Italy
