= 2021 Austin Gilgronis season =

2021 MLR season by club

- Major League Rugby Rank: 3rd West
- 2021 record: Wins: 9; draws: 0; losses: 7

Team information
- CEO: (Australia) Adam Gilchrist
- Coach: (New Zealand) Sam Harris
- Captain: (United States) Bryce Campbell
- Stadium: Bold Stadium (5,036)
← 2020	2022 →

The 2021 Austin Gilgronis season was the club's fourth season in Major League Rugby. Sam Harris was the coach of the club for first year. Bryce Campbell was the captain the club for the first year as well. The team finished the season in third in the Western Conference standings and did not qualify for the 2021 Major League Rugby playoffs.

The Gilgronis played their home matchups at Bold Stadium in Austin, Texas.

== Schedule ==
2021 Austin Gilgronis match results
Date	Round	Opponent	Venue	Score
March 20	Round 1	Utah Warriors	Bold Stadium	L 28–30
March 28	Round 2	San Diego Legion	Bold Stadium	L 11–14
April 3	Round 3	Houston SaberCats	Bold Stadium	W 26–0
April 10	Round 4	at New Orleans Gold	The Gold Mine	W 18–15
April 17	Round 5	Rugby ATL	Bold Stadium	W 17-15
April 25	Round 6	Seattle Seawolves	Bold Stadium	W 42-15
May 8	Round 8	at New England Free Jacks	Union Point Sports Complex	L 18-22
May 15	Round 9	Rugby United New York	Bold Stadium	W 16-9
May 19	Round 10	LA Giltinis	Bold Stadium	L 3-17
May 29	Round 11	at Utah Warriors	Zions Bank Stadium	L 24-45
June 5	Round 12	at Houston SaberCats	Aveva Stadium	W 28-9
June 12	Round 13	Toronto Arrows	Bold Stadium	W 47-21
June 20	Round 14	at Seattle Seawolves	Starfire Sports Complex	W 36-31
June 26	Round 15	at San Diego Legion	Torero Stadium	W 33-14
July 10	Round 17	at LA Giltinis	Los Angeles Memorial Coliseum	L 17-31
July 17	Round 18	at Old Glory DC	Segra Field	L 25-29

=== Standings ===
Season Standings
Western Conference
Pos	Team	P	W	D	L	PF	PA	PD	TF	TA	TB	LB	Pts
1	LA Giltinis (CH)	16	12	0	4	545	305	+240	80	37	11	4	63
2	Utah Warriors (SF)	16	10	0	6	506	464	+42	72	65	13	4	57
3	Austin Gilgronis	16	9	0	7	389	317	+72	51	43	7	4	47
4	San Diego Legion	16	6	0	10	430	464	-34	61	63	9	5	38
5	Seattle Seawolves	16	4	0	12	343	461	-118	46	63	4	6	26
6	Houston SaberCats	16	2	0	14	274	550	-276	31	80	3	2	13
If teams are level at any stage, tiebreaker criteria are as follows (coin tosses or draw of lots will be used if those below fail): 1. number of matches won 2. the difference between points for and points against 3. the number of tries scored 4. the most points scored 5. the difference between tries for and tries against 6. the fewest red cards received 7. the fewest yellow cards received
Green background indicates teams in position for the Playoffs (CH) Champions. (RU) Runners-up. (SF) Losing semi-finalists. Last Updated: 18 July 2021
