= 2021 LA Giltinis season =

2021 MLR season by club

- Major League Rugby rank: 1st West
- 2021 record: Wins: 12; draws: 0; losses: 4

Team information
- CEO: (Australia) Adam Gilchrist
- Coach: (Australia) Darren Coleman
- Captain: (Australia) Dave Dennis
- Stadium: Los Angeles Memorial Coliseum (77,500)
2022 →

The 2021 LA Giltinis season was the club's inaugural season in Major League Rugby. Darren Coleman was the first coach of the club. Dave Dennis was the club's first ever captain. The team finished the season first in the Western Conference standings and qualified for the 2021 Major League Rugby playoffs. The Giltinis won the Final against Rugby ATL. The team was the second to win the championship in its first season, after Seattle Seawolves achieved it back in 2018, the inaugural season of Major League Rugby.

The LA Giltinis played their home matchups at Los Angeles Memorial Coliseum in Los Angeles, California. Due to a scheduling conflict at the stadium, SoFi Stadium was used for a matchup against Utah Warriors.

== Schedule ==
2021 LA Giltinis match results
Date	Round	Opponent	Venue	Score
March 20	Round 1	New England Free Jacks	Los Angeles Memorial Coliseum	W 42–27
March 28	Round 2	Seattle Seawolves	Los Angeles Memorial Coliseum	W 57–26
April 10	Round 4	at Toronto Arrows	The Gold Mine	W 43–16
April 17	Round 5	at Houston SaberCats	Aveva Stadium	W 48-33
April 24	Round 6	San Diego Legion	Los Angeles Memorial Coliseum	W 45-17
May 1	Round 7	Old Glory DC	Los Angeles Memorial Coliseum	W 47-17
May 8	Round 8	at Rugby United New York	Cochrane Stadium	L 16-18
May 15	Round 9	Utah Warriors	SoFi Stadium	W 38-27
May 19	Round 10	at Austin Gilgronis	Bold Stadium	W 17-3
May 29	Round 11	at Rugby ATL	Lupo Family Field	L 12-17
June 13	Round 13	Houston SaberCats	Los Angeles Memorial Coliseum	W 52-5
June 20	Round 14	at San Diego Legion	Torero Stadium	W 19-13
June 27	Round 15	at Seattle Seawolves	Starfire Sports Complex	W 29-14
July 4	Round 16	New Orleans Gold	Los Angeles Memorial Coliseum	L 20-21
July 10	Round 17	Austin Gilgronis	Los Angeles Memorial Coliseum	W 31-17
July 17	Round 18	at Utah Warriors	Zions Bank Stadium	L 29-34

=== Postseason ===
Date	Round	Opponent	Home/Away	Result
July 25	Western Conference Final	Utah Warriors	Los Angeles Memorial Coliseum	W 17-13
August 1	MLR Final	Rugby ATL	Los Angeles Memorial Coliseum	W 31-17

=== Standings ===
Season Standings
Western Conference
Pos	Team	P	W	D	L	PF	PA	PD	TF	TA	TB	LB	Pts
1	LA Giltinis (CH)	16	12	0	4	545	305	+240	80	37	11	4	63
2	Utah Warriors (SF)	16	10	0	6	506	464	+42	72	65	13	4	57
3	Austin Gilgronis	16	9	0	7	389	317	+72	51	43	7	4	47
4	San Diego Legion	16	6	0	10	430	464	-34	61	63	9	5	38
5	Seattle Seawolves	16	4	0	12	343	461	-118	46	63	4	6	26
6	Houston SaberCats	16	2	0	14	274	550	-276	31	80	3	2	13
If teams are level at any stage, tiebreaker criteria are as follows (coin tosses or draw of lots will be used if those below fail): 1. number of matches won 2. the difference between points for and points against 3. the number of tries scored 4. the most points scored 5. the difference between tries for and tries against 6. the fewest red cards received 7. the fewest yellow cards received
Green background indicates teams in position for the Playoffs (CH) Champions. (RU) Runners-up. (SF) Losing semi-finalists. Last Updated: 18 July 2021
