= 1987 Wellington 500 =

(New Zealand) 1987 Wellington 500
Race details
- Round 10 of 11 in the 1987 World Touring Car Championship at Wellington Street Circuit in Wellington, New Zealand.
- Date: 26 October, 1987
- Location: Wellington, New Zealand
- Course: Wellington Street Circuit; 3.228 kilometres (2.006 mi)
- Laps: 150
Pole position
Driver		(Germany) Klaus Ludwig	Eggenberger Motorsport
Time		1:29.420	
Podium
First		(Germany) Klaus Ludwig (Germany) Klaus Niedzwiedz	Eggenberger Motorsport
Second		(Italy) Emanuele Pirro (Italy) Roberto Ravaglia	Schnitzer Motorsport
Third		(United Kingdom) Steve Soper (Belgium) Pierre Dieudonné	Eggenberger Motorsport
Fastest Lap
Driver		(United Kingdom) Steve Soper	Eggenberger Motorsport
Time		1:32.280	

The 1987 Nissan Mobil 500 was the tenth round of the inaugural World Touring Car Championship. The race was held for cars eligible for Group A touring car regulations. It was held on October 26, 1987, at the Wellington Street Circuit in the docks area of Wellington, New Zealand.

== Official results ==
Pos	Class	No	Team	Drivers	Car	Laps	Qual Pos	Series Points
1	3	7	(Switzerland) Eggenberger Motorsport	(Germany) Klaus Ludwig (Germany) Klaus Niedzwiedz	Ford Sierra RS500	150	1	40
2	2	46	(Germany) Schnitzer Motorsport	(Italy) Emanuele Pirro (Italy) Roberto Ravaglia	BMW M3	150	3	35
3	3	6	(Switzerland) Eggenberger Motorsport	(United Kingdom) Steve Soper (Belgium) Pierre Dieudonné	Ford Sierra RS500	150	2	27
4	3	30	(Australia) Peter Jackson Nissan Racing	(Australia) George Fury (Australia) Glenn Seton (Australia) Terry Shiel	Nissan Skyline RS DR30	149	6	
5	3	05	(Australia) Holden Dealer Team	(Australia) Peter Brock (Australia) David Parsons	Holden VL Commodore SS Group A	148	5	
6	2	40	(Germany) Schnitzer Motorsport	(Germany) Markus Oestreich (Austria) Roland Ratzenberger	BMW M3	148	10	25
7	2	41	(Italy) CiBiEmme	(Germany) Altfrid Heger (Australia) Tony Longhurst	BMW M3	146	18	
8	3	24	(New Zealand) Team Nissan Racing NZ	(New Zealand) Graeme Crosby (Australia) Gary Sprague	Nissan Skyline RS DR30	145	21	
9	3	25	(New Zealand) Team Nissan Racing NZ	(New Zealand) Graeme Bowkett (New Zealand) Kent Baigent	Nissan Skyline RS DR30	145	7	
10	2	44	(New Zealand) Bryce Racing	(New Zealand) Paul Radisich (Germany) Ludwig Finauer	BMW 325i	141	26	
11	3	11	(Australia) Perkins Engineering	(Australia) Larry Perkins (New Zealand) Denny Hulme	Holden VK Commodore SS Group A	140	12	
12	2	62	(Germany) Schwaben Motorsport	(Germany) Thomas von Löwis of Menar (Germany) Leopold von Bayern	BMW M3	140	22	
13	3	16	(Sweden) Söderqvist Racing Services Team	(Sweden) Ulf Granberg (Sweden) Stig Blomqvist	Volvo 240T	137	15	
14	3	32	(New Zealand) Anderson & O'Leary	(New Zealand) Bruce Anderson (New Zealand) Wayne Anderson	Ford Mustang	135	29	
15	3	31	(New Zealand) Sax Racing	(New Zealand) John Sorenson (New Zealand) Kayne Scott	BMW 635 CSi	135	33	
16	1	94	(New Zealand) Gullivers Ltd	(New Zealand) Andrew Bagnall (New Zealand) Mark Jennings (United Kingdom) Chris Hodgetts	Toyota Sprinter AE86	135	30	
17	3	27	(Australia) Ray Gulson	(Australia) Graham Gulson (Australia) Ray Gulson	BMW 635 CSi	134	34	
18	1	90		(New Zealand) David Slater (New Zealand) Ross Heffernan	Toyota Corolla GT	131	35	
19	2	53	(New Zealand) Viacard Services	(New Zealand) Trevor Crowe (New Zealand) Jim Richards	BMW M3	116	8	
20	3	13	(New Zealand) Viacard Services	(Australia) Charlie O'Brien (New Zealand) Avon Hyde (New Zealand) Jim Richards	BMW 635 CSi	106	17	
21	1	100	(Italy) Alfa Romeo Benelux	(Italy) Giorgio Francia (Italy) Daniele Toffoli	Alfa Romeo 33	103	36	28
DNF	3	3	(Australia) Bob Jane T-Marts Racing	(Australia) Allan Grice (United Kingdom) Win Percy	Holden Commodore VL SS Group A	131	4	
DNF	1	92		(New Zealand) Bryan Bate (New Zealand) Robbie Ridgers	Toyota Corolla GT	129	37	
DNF	2	47	(Germany) Schnitzer Motorsport	(Germany) Anette Meeuvissen (Austria) Mercedes Stermitz	BMW M3	126	24	
DNF	1	91		(New Zealand) Allan Drinkrow (New Zealand) Bruce Drinkrow	Toyota Corolla GT	109	38	
DNF	3	17	(Australia) Shell Ultra Hi-Tech Racing Team	(Australia) Dick Johnson (Australia) Gregg Hansford	Ford Sierra RS500	103	32	
DNF	3	10	(Australia) Holden Dealer Team	(New Zealand) David Oxton (Australia) Neil Crompton (Australia) Peter Brock	Holden Commodore VL SS Group A	89	20	
DNF	3	4	(Sweden) Söderqvist Racing Services Team	(Sweden) Per-Gunnar Andersson (New Zealand) Ian Tulloch	Volvo 240T	68	19	
DNF	3	18	(Australia) Shell Ultra Hi-Tech Racing Team	(New Zealand) Neal Lowe (New Zealand) Neville Crichton (Australia) Dick Johnson	Ford Sierra RS500	68	16	
DNF	3	35	(Australia) Oxo Supercube Motorsport	(Australia) Andrew Miedecke (New Zealand) Phil Myhre	Ford Sierra RS500	58	14	
DNF	2	42	(Italy) CiBiEmme	(Venezuela) Johnny Cecotto (Italy) Gianfranco Brancatelli	BMW M3	44	9	
DNF	3	19	(New Zealand) Canam Enterprises	(New Zealand) Graeme Cameron (New Zealand) Wayne Wilkinson	Holden Commodore VL SS Group A	38	23	
DNF	2	54	(New Zealand) Sax Racing	(New Zealand) Graeme Lorimer (New Zealand) John Sax	BMW M3	19	28	
DNF	1	72		(New Zealand) Brett Riley (New Zealand) Ken Smith	Toyota Celica GT	17	31	
DNF	3	21	(New Zealand) D.F.C. NZ Ltd	(New Zealand) John Billington (New Zealand) Chris Castle	Holden Commodore VK SS Group A	14	27	
DNF	2	43	(Italy) Bigazzi	(Germany) Winni Vogt (France) Olivier Grouillard	BMW M3	10	13	
DNF	3	23	(New Zealand) Police Community	(New Zealand) Glenn McIntyre (New Zealand) Robbie Ker	Ford Mustang	9	25	
DNF	3	15	(Australia) Peter Jackson Nissan Racing	(Australia) Glenn Seton (Australia) John Bowe	Nissan Skyline RS DR30	7	11	

Italics indicate driver practiced this car but did not race.

== Statistics ==
- Pole Position - #7 Klaus Ludwig - 1:29.42
- Fastest Lap - #6 Steve Soper - 1:32.28

World Touring Car Championship
Previous race: 1987 Calder 500	1987 season	Next race: 1987 Fuji 500
