= Roland Suniula =

US international rugby union player

- Born: December 17, 1986 (age 39) Pago Pago, American Samoa
- Height: 5 ft 11 in (1.80 m)
- Weight: 220 lb (100 kg)
- Notable relative(s): Shalom Suniula (brother), Andrew Suniula (brother)

Rugby union career
- Position(s): Centre, Fly-half
Amateur team(s)
Years	Team	Apps	(Points)
2012	Chicago Griffins		
Senior career
Years	Team	Apps	(Points)
2012–2013	Auch	14	(0)
2013–2014	CS Vienne	17	(5)
2014–2016	Chalon	20	(15)
2016	Ohio Aviators	11	(5)
2017–2018	Valorugby Emilia	11	(5)
2018	Austin Elite	5	(5)
2019	Seattle Seawolves	9	(0)
2020–	Austin Herd		
- Correct as of 28 December 2020
Provincial / State sides
Years	Team	Apps	(Points)
2005–2008	North Harbour		
International career
Years	Team	Apps	(Points)
2009–2013	United States	17	(5)
- Correct as of 17 August 2013
National sevens team
Years	Team		Comps
2012	United States		2
- Correct as of 28 December 2020

Roland Suniula (born December 17, 1986) is an American international rugby union player who plays for the Austin Elite as a centre in Major League Rugby (MLR).

He previously played for the Seattle Seawolves in the MLR and the Ohio Aviators as a centre in PRO Rugby. He is the brother of Andrew and Shalom Suniula, who have also represented the United States Eagles rugby union (both sevens and XV's).

== Early life ==
In 2004, Suniula graduated from Kelston Boys' High School which has produced several New Zealand All Blacks players.

== Professional Rugby Career ==
Suniula played for North Harbour between 2005–2008.

He debuted for the U.S. Sevens team in October 2008 in their NAWIRA RWC 7s Qualifier event and has appeared in 13 IRB tournaments.

He played with the Chicago Griffins for the 2012 Rugby Super League season.

Suniula signed with FC Auch Gers for the 2012-13 Pro D2 season. After one season with team he joined CS Vienne where he made 18 appearances for the team during the 2013-14 season. In May 2014, Suniula signed a two-year deal with an option for a third with RC Chalon another Fédérale 1 side.

In 2016, Roland signed to play for the Ohio Aviators in the inaugural season of PRO Rugby USA. On April 17, 2016, he scored the first try for Ohio against the Denver Stampede.

During the 2016–17 season, Roland played for Ohio's Columbus Rugby Club, as well as a coach for the Tiger Rugby Academy.

In September 2017, Roland played with Misfits Rugby in Colorado's Aspen Ruggerfest.

He also played for Rugby Reggio in Emilia, Italy in the Italian Eccellenza League for the 2018 season.

In 2018, Roland played with his brother Andrew for Austin Elite and in 2019, he currently plays with his brother Shalom for the Seattle Seawolves in the MLR.
