= 2019 Austin Elite season =

2019 MLR season by club

- Major League Rugby rank: 9th overall
- 2019 record: Wins: 0; draws: 0; losses: 16

Team information
- Coach: (France) Alain Hyardet
- Captain: (England) Ben Mitchell
- Stadium: Dell Diamond (11,500); Toyota Field (Alternate) (Capacity: 8,296)
← 2018	2020 →

The 2019 Austin Elite season was club's second season in Major League Rugby. The 2019 season was the program's last season under the name Austin Elite. In September 2019, the program announced the club to be renamed to Austin Herd, but was later changed to Austin Gilgronis, due to new ownership. Alain Hyardet was the coach of the club for the second consecutive year. Ben Mitchell was the captain the club for the first year.

The Elite played their home matchups at Dell Diamond in Round Rock, Texas. The program used an alternate stadium to host a game in San Antonio at Toyota Field.

Austin Elite finished the season winless and became the first time in Major League Rugby to do so.

== Schedule ==
=== Exhibition ===
Date	Opponent	Home/Away	Result
January 11	Houston SaberCats	Away	Won, 14–10
January 19	Dallas Reds	Away	Postponed

=== Regular season ===
2019 Austin Gilgronis match results
Date	Round	Opponent	Venue	Score
January 26	Round1	Houston SaberCats	Dell Diamond	L 20–21
February 1	Round 2	Utah Warriors	Dell Diamond	L 9–17
February 8	Round 3	Toronto Arrows	Dell Diamond	L 19–23
February 17	Round 4	Glendale Raptors	Dell Diamond	L 13–24
February 23	Round 5	San Diego Legion	Dell Diamond	L 17–45
March 9	Round 7	at Glendale Raptors	Infinity Park	L 19–38
March 16	Round 8	Seattle Seawolves	Dell Diamond	L 17–29
March 23	Round 9	at New Orleans Gold	Archbishop Shaw Stadium	L 31–35
March 30	Round 10	Rugby United New York	Toyota Field	L 11–19
April 7	Round 11	at San Diego Legion	Torero Stadium	L 15–45
April 27	Round 14	at Utah Warriors	Zions Bank Stadium	L 19–35
May 4	Round 15	at New Orleans Gold	Archbishop Shaw Stadium	L 14–26
May 9	Round 12	Toronto Arrows	Alumni Field	L 13–24
May 19	Round 17	Rugby United New York	MCU Park	L 7–27
May 25	Round 18	Houston SaberCats	Aveva Stadium	L 15–36
June 2	Round 19	Seattle Seawolves	Starfire Sports Complex	L 26–38

=== Standings ===
Major League Rugby
Pos	Team	P	W	D	L	PF	PA	PD	TB	LB	Pts
1	San Diego Legion	16	12	1	3	457	296	+161	8	3	61
2	Seattle Seawolves	16	11	1	4	498	407	+91	10	2	58
3	Toronto Arrows	16	11	0	5	472	362	+110	9	4	57
4	Rugby United New York	16	11	0	5	411	320	+91	7	3	54
5	New Orleans Gold	16	9	0	7	463	403	+60	11	6	53
6	Glendale Raptors	16	7	2	7	456	463	−7	10	1	43
7	Houston SaberCats	16	6	0	10	343	496	−151	5	1	30
8	Utah Warriors	16	2	2	12	381	517	−136	4	5	21
9	Austin Elite	16	0	0	16	263	482	−219	2	3	5
Updated: June 2, 2019 Source:
Four points for a win, two for a draw, and no points for a bye. One bonus point for scoring four or more tries (TB). One bonus point for losing by seven or less (LB). • Teams 1 to 4 (Green background) at the end of the regular season qualify for the semifinals.
