= 2022 LA Giltinis season =

2022 MLR season by club

- Major League Rugby Rank: 2nd West
- 2022 record: Wins: 11; draws: 0; losses: 5

Team information
- CEO: (Australia) Adam Gilchrist
- Coach: (Australia) Stephen Hoiles
- Captain: (Australia) Dave Dennis
- Stadium: Los Angeles Memorial Coliseum (77,500)
← 2021

The 2022 LA Giltinis season was the club's second and final season in Major League Rugby. Stephen Hoiles was the coach of the club for his first full year. Dave Dennis was the captain the club for the second consecutive year. The team finished the season second in the Western Conference standings, but was later disqualified from competing in the 2022 Major League Rugby playoffs due to violating league rules. The team was removed from the league for the 2023 season.

The Giltinis played their home matchups at Los Angeles Memorial Coliseum in Los Angeles, California.

== Schedule ==
2022 LA Giltinis match results
Date	Round	Opponent	Venue	Score
February 5	Round 1	at Houston SaberCats	Aveva Stadium	L 11-21
February 11	Round 2	at Toronto Arrows	Starlight Stadium	W 31-16
February 27	Round 4	New England Free Jacks	Los Angeles Memorial Coliseum	W 19-15
March 5	Round 5	at Austin Gilgronis	Bold Stadium	L 9-22
March 13	Round 6	Utah Warriors	Los Angeles Memorial Coliseum	L 19-28
March 19	Round 7	San Diego Legion	Los Angeles Memorial Coliseum	W 26-13
March 26	Round 8	at Seattle Seawolves	Starfire Sports Complex	W 31-12
April 3	Round 9	Dallas Jackals	Los Angeles Memorial Coliseum	W 47-7
April 10	Round 10	Rugby United New York	Los Angeles Memorial Coliseum	W 43-0
April 16	Round 11	Houston SaberCats	Los Angeles Memorial Coliseum	W 17-12
April 30	Round 13	at Rugby ATL	Atlanta Silverbacks Park	W 31-19
May 8	Round 14	Austin Gilgronis	Los Angeles Memorial Coliseum	W 10-8
May 15	Round 15	at San Diego Legion	SDSU Sports Deck	L 27-31
May 21	Round 16	at Dallas Jackals	Choctaw Stadium	W 56-12
May 28	Round 17	at Utah Warriors	Zions Bank Stadium	W 39-32
June 5	Round 18	Seattle Seawolves	Los Angeles Memorial Coliseum	L 27-35

=== Standings ===
MLR Western Conference
Pos	Team	Pld	W	D	L	PF	PA	PD	TF	TA	TB	LB	Pts	Qualification
1	Austin Gilgronis (Note: Austin Gilgronis & LA Giltinis were disqualified from any 2022 postseason play.) (D)	16	12	0	4	475	229	+246	64	27	9	1	58	Disqualified from postseason play
2	LA Giltinis (D)	16	11	0	5	443	283	+160	61	36	9	1	54	Disqualified from postseason play
3	Houston SaberCats (SF)	16	9	0	7	408	393	+15	61	53	8	4	48	Western Conference Finals
4	Seattle Seawolves (RU)	16	9	0	7	435	354	+81	54	45	6	4	46	Western Conference Semi-Finals
5	San Diego Legion	16	8	0	8	475	428	+47	59	54	8	3	43	Western Conference Semi-Finals
6	Utah Warriors	16	5	0	11	424	395	+29	57	56	6	7	33	
7	Dallas Jackals	16	0	0	16	198	752	−554	27	112	2	2	4	

Updated to match(es) played on June 6, 2022. Source:
Rules for classification: If teams are level at any stage, tiebreaker criteria are as follows (coin tosses or draw of lots will be used if those below fail):
1. number of matches won
2. the difference between points for and points against
3. the number of tries scored
4. the most points scored
5. the difference between tries for and tries against
6. the fewest red cards received
7. the fewest yellow cards received
  (D) Disqualified from postseason play; (SF) Losing semi-finalist; (RU) Runners-up.
  Notes:
