= 2022 Austin Gilgronis season =

2022 MLR season by club

- Major League Rugby rank: 1st West
- 2022 record: Wins: 12; draws: 0; losses: 4

Team information
- CEO: (Australia) Adam Gilchrist
- Coach: (New Zealand) Sam Harris
- Captain: (United States) Bryce Campbell
- Stadium: Bold Stadium (5,036)
← 2021

The 2022 Austin Gilgronis season was the club's fifth and final season in Major League Rugby. Sam Harris was the coach of the club for the second consecutive year. Bryce Campbell was the captain the club for the second consecutive year as well. The team finished the season in first in the Western Conference standings, but was later disqualified from competing in the 2022 Major League Rugby playoffs due to violating league rules. The team was removed from the league for the 2023 season.

The Gilgronis played their home matchups at Bold Stadium in Austin, Texas.

== Schedule ==
2022 Austin Gilgronis match results
Date	Round	Opponent	Venue	Score
February 5	Round 1	Dallas Jackals	Bold Stadium	W 43–7
February 12	Round 2	Old Glory DC	Bold Stadium	W 57–12
February 19	Round 3	Utah Warriors	Bold Stadium	W 24–10
February 26	Round 4	at Seattle Seawolves	Starfire Sports Complex	W 25–18
March 5	Round 5	LA Giltinis	Bold Stadium	W 22–9
March 12	Round 6	at Rugby ATL	Atlanta Silverbacks Park	L 14–29
March 19	Round 7	New England Free Jacks	Bold Stadium	L 17–25
April 3	Round 9	Houston SaberCats	Bold Stadium	W 43–5
April 10	Round 10	at San Diego Legion	SDSU Sports Deck	W 35–21
April 16	Round 11	at Dallas Jackals	Choctaw Stadium	W 55–3
April 23	Round 12	at New Orleans Gold	The Gold Mine	W 32–10
May 1	Round 13	Seattle Seawolves	Bold Stadium	W 17–6
May 8	Round 14	at LA Giltinis	Los Angeles Memorial Coliseum	L 8–10
May 21	Round 16	at Utah Warriors	Zions Bank Stadium	L 8-22
May 28	Round 17	San Diego Legion	Bold Stadium	W 44–28
June 3	Round 18	at Houston SaberCats	Aveva Stadium	W 29–14

=== Standings ===
MLR Western Conference
Pos	Team	Pld	W	D	L	PF	PA	PD	TF	TA	TB	LB	Pts	Qualification
1	Austin Gilgronis (Note: Austin Gilgronis & LA Giltinis were disqualified from any 2022 postseason play.) (D)	16	12	0	4	475	229	+246	64	27	9	1	58	Disqualified from postseason play
2	LA Giltinis (D)	16	11	0	5	443	283	+160	61	36	9	1	54	Disqualified from postseason play
3	Houston SaberCats (SF)	16	9	0	7	408	393	+15	61	53	8	4	48	Western Conference Finals
4	Seattle Seawolves (RU)	16	9	0	7	435	354	+81	54	45	6	4	46	Western Conference Semi-Finals
5	San Diego Legion	16	8	0	8	475	428	+47	59	54	8	3	43	Western Conference Semi-Finals
6	Utah Warriors	16	5	0	11	424	395	+29	57	56	6	7	33	
7	Dallas Jackals	16	0	0	16	198	752	−554	27	112	2	2	4	

Updated to match(es) played on June 6, 2022. Source:
Rules for classification: If teams are level at any stage, tiebreaker criteria are as follows (coin tosses or draw of lots will be used if those below fail):
1. number of matches won
2. the difference between points for and points against
3. the number of tries scored
4. the most points scored
5. the difference between tries for and tries against
6. the fewest red cards received
7. the fewest yellow cards received
  (D) Disqualified from postseason play; (SF) Losing semi-finalist; (RU) Runners-up.
  Notes:
