= 2020 Austin Gilgronis season =

2020 MLR season by club

- Major League Rugby Rank: 5th West
- 2020 record: Wins: 1; draws: 1; losses: 3

Team information
- CEO: (Australia) Adam Gilchrist
- Coach: (New Zealand) Brent Semmons
- Captain: (South Africa) Zinzan Elan-Puttick
- Stadium: Bold Stadium (5,036); Toyota Field (Alternate) (Capacity: 8,296)
← 2019	2021 →

The 2020 Austin Gilgronis season was the club's third season in Major League Rugby. The 2020 season was the program's first season under the name Austin Gilgronis, having competed under the name Austin Elite for its first two season. Brent Semmons was the coach of the club for the first year. Zinzan Elan-Puttick was the captain the club for the first year as well. The season was later canceled in March due to the COVID-19 pandemic.

The Gilgronis played their home matchups at Bold Stadium in Austin, Texas for the first time since playing in Round Rock the past two seasons. The program used an alternate stadium to host a game in San Antonio at Toyota Field.

== Schedule ==
2020 Austin Gilgronis match results
Date	Round	Opponent	Venue	Score
February 9	Round 1	Toronto Arrows	Bold Stadium	L 10–38
February 15	Round 2	at Rugby United New York	Sam Boyd Stadium	L 31–49
February 22	Round 3	Utah Warriors	Bold Stadium	D 20–20
February 29	Round 4	Old Glory DC	Toyota Field	L 19–28
March 7	Round 5	at Houston SaberCats	Aveva Stadium	W 24–20

=== Standings ===
Season Standings
Western Conference
Pos	Team	P	W	D	L	PF	PA	PD	TF	TA	TB	LB	Pts
1	San Diego Legion	5	5	0	0	161	108	+53	21	13	3	0	23
2	Utah Warriors	5	2	1	2	125	134	-9	15	18	2	0	12
3	Colorado Raptors	5	2	0	3	98	130	-32	11	16	0	1	9
4	Seattle Seawolves	5	1	0	4	138	162	-24	15	22	2	2	8
5	Austin Gilgronis	5	1	1	3	104	155	-51	13	19	1	0	7
6	Houston SaberCats	5	1	0	4	99	116	-17	11	12	0	2	6
If teams are level at any stage, tiebreakers are applied in the following order: 1. number of matches won 2. the difference between points for and points against 3. the number of tries scored 4. the most points scored 5. the difference between tries for and tries against 6. the fewest red cards received 7. the fewest yellow cards received
Green background indicates teams in position for the Conference Finals; Blue background indicates teams in position for the Conference Semi-Finals (CH) Champions. (RU) Runners-up. (SF) Losing semi-finalists. Last Updated: March 7, 2020
