= Shalom Suniula =

US international rugby union & league player

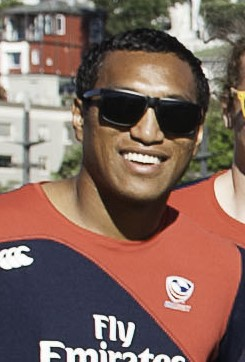
- Suniula in 2014

Personal information
- Born: June 5, 1988 (age 38) American Samoa
- Height: 5 ft 8 in (1.73 m)
- Weight: 190 lb (13 st 8 lb; 86 kg)
- Relatives: Roland Suniula (brother), Andrew Suniula (brother)
- Rugby league career

Playing information
Club
| Years | Team | Pld | T | G | FG | P |
|---|---|---|---|---|---|---|
| | Souths Logan Magpies |
Representative
| Years | Team | Pld | T | G | FG | P |
| | Junior Kiwis |

Sport

Rugby union career
- Position(s): Scrumhalf, Flyhalf, Center
Amateur team(s)
| Years | Team | Apps | (Points) |
| 2011 | Belmont Shore RFC | | |
Senior career
| Years | Team | Apps | (Points) |
| 2018– | Seattle Seawolves | 30 | (25) |
International career
| Years | Team | Apps | (Points) |
| 2014–2016 | United States | 18 | (5) |
- Correct as of 26 June 2016
National sevens team
| Years | Team | | Comps |
| 2008– | United States | | 41 |

Shalom Suniula (born June 5, 1988) is a former rugby league and rugby union player, who played for the Seattle Seawolves in Major League Rugby (MLR), and for the United States national rugby sevens team. He played rugby union for the United States Eagles XV's, USA Sevens, and at club level for Belmont Shore RFC, as a scrum-half or fly-half. His brothers Andrew and Roland Suniula also played rugby for the U.S.

Suniula previously played representative level rugby league for the New Zealand Junior Kiwis national rugby league team, and at club level for Souths Logan Magpies.

Suniula was a talented play maker who was known for his dangerous side step. On August 5, 2021, he confirmed his retirement to a decorated rugby career at the age of 33 after winning international honors for the US and two Major League Rugby titles. He joined older brothers Andrew and Roland in retirement.

== Early life ==
Born in American Samoa, Suniula migrated to New Zealand at a young age, and attended Kelston Boys' High School in Auckland. In 2004 he was selected for the New Zealand Junior Kiwis national rugby league team. and also played for Souths Logan Magpies in the Queensland Cup.

== U.S. national team ==
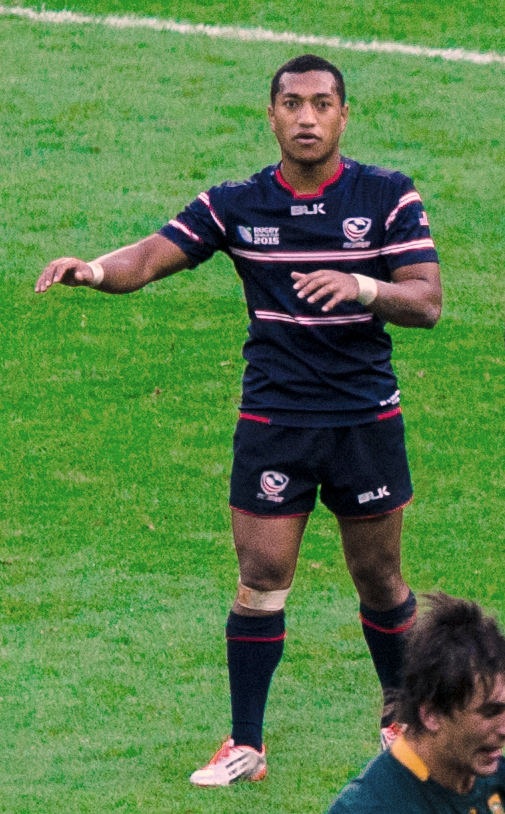
Suniula playing for the United States during the 2015 World Cup

During his career, Suniula was among the leading American rugby sevens players on the World Rugby Sevens Series circuit in several major statistical categories, including appearances, points scored and goals kicked. For the 2011-12 IRB Sevens World Series, Suniula was captain of the team.

Suniula made his debut for the United States national rugby sevens team at the NAWIRA RWC 7s Qualifier in fall 2008, and became a regular for the US during the 2008-09 IRB Sevens World Series. Suniula played for the US at the 2009 Rugby World Cup Sevens. Suniula was the only US player to participate in every tournament during the 2009-10 IRB Sevens World Series tournament.

Suniula also represented the United States at the 2011 Pan American Games, where Suniula and his teammates earned a bronze medal.

== Other achievements ==
Suniula played his club rugby for Belmont Shore, and was named MVP as Belmont Shore won the USA Rugby Men's Club Sevens Championship in 2011.

== Personal life ==
Suniula married his wife in 2012.

Suniula is a Christian. Suniula has spoken about his faith saying, "God has blessed me with talent, and God's Word asks us what we are going to do with the talents He gives us. Rugby has given me a position of influence to be able to help mold and change kids' and adults' lives as I coach and partner with rugby players. With this level of influence comes a certain level of responsibility as well. I want to use my position to show Christ's love — to care for people as He cares for us all."

Shalom Suniula is the brother of Andrew Suniula and Roland Suniula, who are both also rugby players who have played for the United States national teams.
