= 2021 Major League Rugby final =

US Championship rugby union match

2021 Major League Rugby Championship Final
- Event: 2021 Major League Rugby season
LA Giltinis (Western Conference)	Rugby ATL (Eastern Conference)
31	17
- Match details
- Date: August 1, 2021
- Venue: Los Angeles Memorial Coliseum, Los Angeles
- Man of the Match: Matt Giteau (LA Giltinis)
- Referee: JP Doyle (England)
- Attendance: 7,389
- Weather: Sunny day 75.2 °F (24.0 °C); 54% humidity

The 2021 Major League Rugby final was the third Major League Rugby championship match, held at the conclusion of the 4th season of the rugby union club competition in North America. It was played on August 1, 2021, at the Los Angeles Memorial Coliseum in Los Angeles, between the LA Giltinis and Rugby ATL.

== Background ==
With the 2020 Major League Rugby season being cancelled due to the COVID-19 pandemic, there was no Championship match, or series, held in 2020. Instead, the Championship series returned for the 2021 season, which featured the arrival of the LA Giltinis, and the departure of the Colorado Raptors, leaving 12 teams to take part over two conferences; the East and West.

The format for the regular season ensured that the top two teams of each conference would compete in a Conference Final, with the victors of each taking part in the Championship Final. The regular season ended with the LA Giltinis and the Utah Warriors as the top two teams in the Western Conference, and Rugby ATL and Rugby United New York as the top two teams in the Eastern Conference. This marked the first time in MLR history that the Seattle Seawolves would not contest the Championship Final.

On July 24, Rugby ATL ground out a narrow win over RUNY, 10–9, to become the Eastern Conference Champions. They also became the first Eastern-based team to make it to the Championship Final (previous finals only had teams that would later be from the Western Conference.)

On July 25, LA Giltinis were able to secure the victory in the final few minutes, with a try by Ryan James in the closing 5 minutes. Their 17–13 score means that they would become Western Conference Champions, the first time a debuting franchise would claim the title. This also ensured that the Championship Final would be contested against solely expansion franchises for the first time.

== Venue ==
The venue was decided by which of the Conference Champions was ranked highest across both conferences. LA, with 63 points, ranked above Atlanta on 57, and held the home advantage for the Championship Final.

== Broadcasting ==
The match was broadcast nationally on CBS. It averaged 478,000 viewers.

== Match ==
August 1, 2021
16:00 EDT (UTC−04)

LA Giltinis	31–17	Rugby ATL
Try: Ryberg (2) 21′ c, 24′ m Van der Merwe 53′ c Con: Giteau (2/3) 22′, 54′ Pen: Giteau (3/3) 19′, 44′, 70′ Burton (1/1) 76′	Report	Try: van Rensburg 36′ c Deacon 78′ c Con: Coleman (2/2) 37′, 79′ Pen: Coleman (1/1) 15′

Los Angeles Memorial Coliseum, Los Angeles
Attendance: 7,389
Referee: JP Doyle (England)

FB	15	(Australia) Luke Burton
RW	14	(United States) John Ryberg
OC	13	(Australia) Adam Ashley-Cooper
IC	12	(Australia) Billy Meakes
LW	11	(Canada) D. T. H. van der Merwe
FH	10	(Australia) Matt Giteau
SH	9	(Australia) Harrison Goddard
N8	8	(Canada) Corey Thomas
OF	7	(Australia) Christian Poidevin
BF	6	(Australia) Angus Cottrell
RL	5	(Australia) Nathan Den Hoedt
LL	4	(Australia) Dave Dennis
TP	3	(Samoa) Marco Fepulea'I
HK	2	(Australia) Mahe Vailanu
LP	1	(Australia) Charlie Abel
Replacements:
HK	16	(Ireland) Sean McNulty
PR	17	(United States) Blake Rogers
PR	18	(Australia) Luke White
LK	19	(Ireland) Sean O’Brien
FL	20	(United States) Pago Haini
SH	21	(Fiji) Serupepeli Vularika
FH	22	(United States) Luke Carty
CE	23	(United States) Ryan James
Coach:
(Australia) Darren Coleman

FB	15	(United States) Austin White
RW	14	(United States) Jeremy Misailegalu
OC	13	(South Africa) Ryan Nell
IC	12	(Argentina) Bautista Ezcurra
LW	11	(New Zealand) Rory Van Vugt
FH	10	(South Africa) Kurt Coleman
SH	9	(South Africa) Rowan Gouws
N8	8	(South Africa) Johan Momsen
OF	7	(Canada) Matthew Heaton
BF	6	(United States) Vili Helu
RL	5	(Canada) Conor Keys
LL	4	(South Africa) Marno Redelinghuys
TP	3	(South Africa) Wikus Groenwald
HK	2	(South Africa) Marko Janse van Rensburg
LP	1	(United States) Alex Maughan
Replacements:
HK	16	(South Africa) Neethling Gericke
PR	17	(United States) Chance Wenglewski
PR	18	(United States) Will Burke
LK	19	(United States) Connor Cook
FL	20	(United States) Ross Deacon
SH	21	(United States) Ryan Rees
FH	22	(South Africa) Robbie Petzer
WG	23	(Ireland) Mark O'Keeffe
Coach:
(United States) Scott Lawrence
