= Willie Losʻe =

Tongan rugby union player (1967–2022)

Willie Los'e
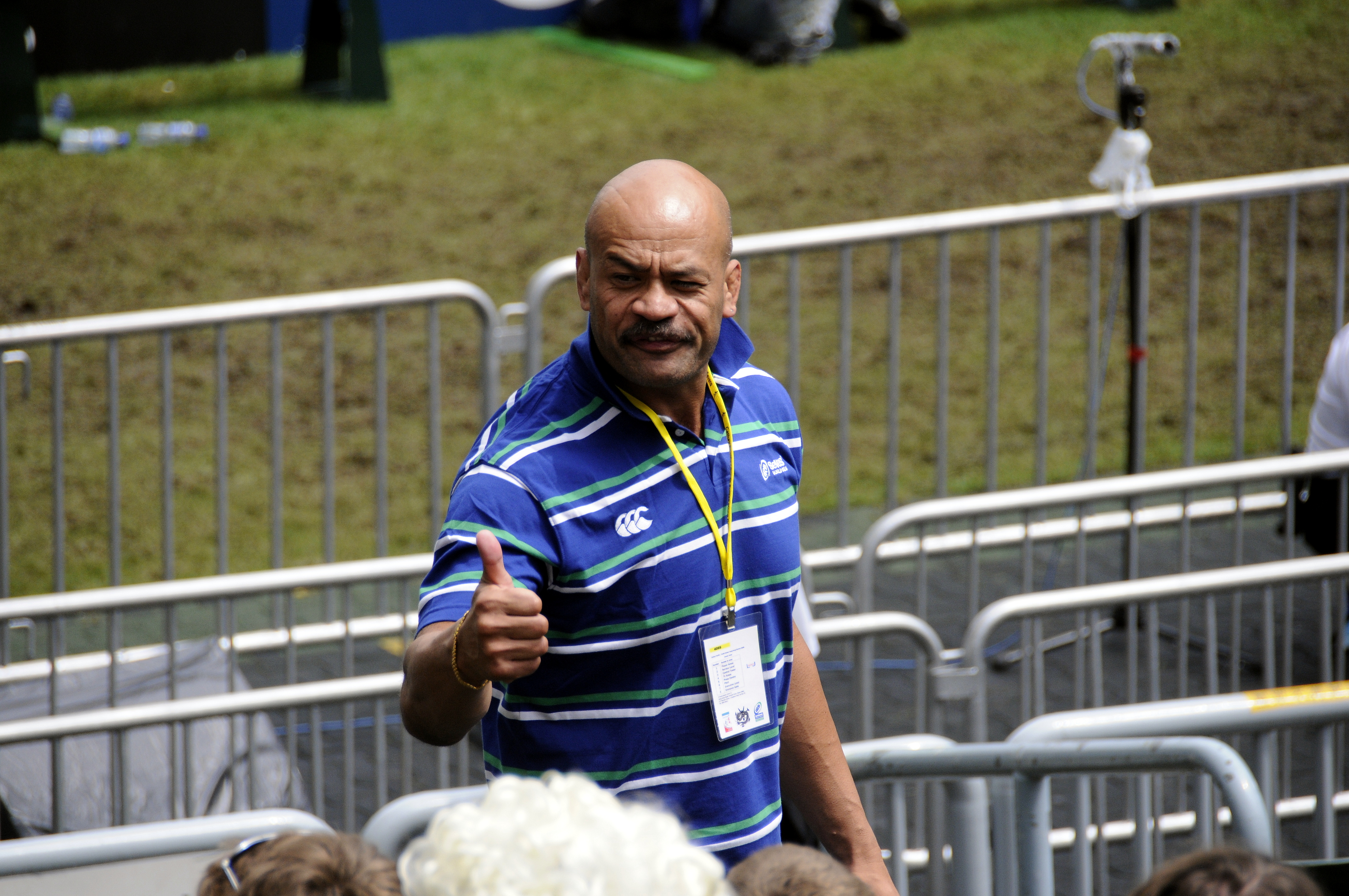
- Los'e at the 2009 Hong Kong Sevens
- Born: William Keith Los'e; 22 July 1967 Auckland, New Zealand
- Died: 7 September 2022 (aged 55) Cape Town, South Africa

Rugby union career
- Position(s): Lock, Flanker
Amateur team(s)
Years	Team	Apps	(Points)
1990–1993	Waitemata		
1994–1995	East Coast Bays		
2001	Renwick		
Senior career
Years	Team	Apps	(Points)
1989-90	Rugby Prato		
1992-93	Messina Rugby		
1996–2001	Yamaha		
Provincial / State sides
Years	Team	Apps	(Points)
1990–1993	Auckland	8	(10)
1994–1995	North Harbour	17	(5)
2001	Marlborough	1	(0)
International career
Years	Team	Apps	(Points)
1988	New Zealand U-21	3	(0)
1995	Tonga	3	(0)

William Keith Los'e (pronounced as "low-SAY"; 22 July 1967 – 7 September 2022) was a Tongan rugby union player who played as a lock. After retiring from playing, he worked as a radio host and TV commentator.

== Early life ==
Los'e was born on 22 July 1967, the son of Kuini and Tavake Los'e. He grew up in West Auckland and attended Kelston Boys' High School, where he was head prefect.

== Playing career ==
Los'e played three matches for the New Zealand Colts in 1988. Eight years later, he played for Tonga in the 1995 Rugby World Cup, playing all three pool stage matches. Los'e also played in the National Provincial Championship for Auckland, North Harbour and Marlborough. His debut for Auckland was against Otago, on 21 September 1991, at Carisbrook, in which he started as a substitute player. Los'e played in Italy, while he was studying Italian since 1989/90 to 1992/93 for Rugby Prato and for Messina Rugby.

Los'e played in Japan for Yamaha Júbilo.

== Broadcasting career ==
After retiring from playing, Los'e worked as host for The Radio Network, where he hosted Radio Sport. He went on to work as a full-time TV commentator for Super Rugby, ITM Cup and more World Rugby Sevens Series events on Sky TV.

Los'e died on 7 September 2022 in Cape Town, while in South Africa for the 2022 Rugby World Cup Sevens.
