= Austin Gilgronis =

Professional rugby union team from Texas, United States

- Full name: Austin Gilgronis
- Nickname: AG's
- Founded: 2017
- Disbanded: 2022
- Location: Austin, Texas
- Ground: Bold Stadium (Capacity: 5,036)
- Most caps: Mason Pedersen (48)
- Top scorer: Mack Mason (187)
- Most tries: Hugh Roach (14)
- League: Major League Rugby
- 2022: Western Conference: 1st Playoffs: Disqualified
| 1st kit | 2nd kit |

The Austin Gilgronis were a professional rugby union team based in Austin, Texas, United States. The team was founded in 2017 as the Austin Elite, and competed in Major League Rugby.

== History ==
On September 19, 2019, after extensive polling at the end of the 2019 campaign, the team opted to rename itself the Herd. The logo remained the same although the orange color action was removed indicating a shift away from using orange for the upcoming season. Prior to the 2020 season, Adam Gilchrist and Loyals LLC purchased the team and renamed it the Gilgronis, a reference to a yet-to-be-produced cocktail based on the Negroni, although the eponymous cocktail appears to just be a negroni with a different name. The name was met with significant backlash from fans. Under Gilchrist's ownership, the team's record improved and the team clinched a playoff berth in its 2022 season before being disqualified from the postseason by MLR for "violating league rules". In October 2022, MLR announced that the Gilgronis and the LA Giltinis (both owned by Adam Gilchrist) had been expelled from the league for unspecified reasons. It appears Gilchrist could no longer financially sustain ownership and that the teams have since folded.

== Home field ==
The team most recently played at the Circuit of the Americas in Bold Stadium, having previously played at Dell Diamond and the Round Rock Multipurpose Complex in Round Rock, Texas.

== Broadcasts ==
2021 home games were shown on KBVO. Lincoln Rose and Kit McConnico were the on-air talent.

== Sponsorship ==
| Season | Kit manufacturer | Shirt sponsor |
|---|---|---|
| 2018–2019 | XBlades | None |
| 2020–2021 | Paladin Sports | None |
| 2022 | Paladin Sports | Ascension Seton |

== Colors and logo ==
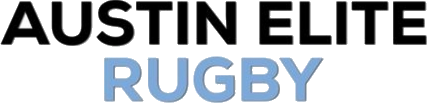
Austin Elite wordmark, 2017–19

The Austin Gilgronis jersey was black, orange, and white. The mascot was a gray fox character named Austin Gray. Gray foxes inhabit central Texas, and Austin Gray's initials were AG; matching that of the team.

The Austin Herd jersey was sky blue, black and white. The initial team logo features the stylized head of a Texas Longhorn bull with a Lone Star on its forehead. The mascot was a bull-like character named Dozer.

The team's final name, Gilgronis, was supposedly the name of a cocktail created by the owners, but that cocktail doesn't seem to exist and the name was more likely an amalgamation of the owners name (Gilchrist) and the popular pre-existing cocktail called the negroni. The home kit was orange, and the away kit was white. The last logo was just the club's initials.

== Players and personnel ==
=== Head coaches ===
- (France) Alain Hyardet (2018–2019)
- (New Zealand) Brent Semmons (2020)
- (Australia) Sam Harris (2021–2022)

=== Assistant coaches ===
- (Australia) Mark Gerrard (2021–2022)

=== Captains ===
- Andrew Suniula (2018)
- Ben Mitchell (2019)
- Zinzan Elan-Puttick (2020)
- Bryce Campbell (2021–2022)

== Records ==
=== Season standings ===
| Pos | Pld | W | D | L | F | A | +/− | BP | Pts | Pld | W | L | F | A | +/− | Result | | |
|---|---|---|---|---|---|---|---|---|---|---|---|---|---|---|---|---|---|---|
| 2018 | - | 5th | 8 | 3 | 0 | 5 | 224 | 238 | −14 | 6 | 18 | – | – | – | – | – | – | Did not qualify |
| 2019 | - | 9th | 16 | 0 | 0 | 16 | 263 | 482 | −219 | 5 | 5 | – | – | – | – | – | – | Did not qualify |
| 2020 (Note: 2020 regular season shortened and playoffs cancelled due to the COVID-19 pandemic.) | Western | 5th | 5 | 1 | 1 | 3 | 104 | 155 | -51 | 1 | 7 | – | – | – | – | – | – | Cancelled |
| 2021 | Western | 3rd | 16 | 9 | 0 | 7 | 389 | 317 | +72 | 11 | 47 | – | – | – | – | – | – | Did not qualify |
| 2022 | Western | 1st | 16 | 12 | 0 | 4 | 475 | 229 | +246 | 9 | 58 | – | – | – | – | – | – | Disqualified |
| Totals | | | 57 | 25 | 1 | 35 | 1,455 | 1,421 | +34 | 32 | 135 | 0 | 0 | 0 | 0 | 0 | 0 | 0 postseason appearances |
