= LA Giltinis =

Professional rugby union team from Los Angeles, California

- Founded: May 28, 2020
- Disbanded: 2022; 4 years ago
- Ground: Los Angeles Memorial Coliseum (Capacity: 77,500)
- CEO: Adam Gilchrist
- Most caps: Nathan Den Hoedt (32)
- Top scorer: Matt Giteau (98)
- Most tries: Angus Cottrell (14)
- League: Major League Rugby
- 2022: Western Conference: 2nd Playoffs: Disqualified
Team kit

The LA Giltinis were a Major League Rugby team based in Los Angeles, California, United States. The team was announced in 2020 and entered the league in the 2021 season as an expansion franchise. Owned by Adam Gilchrist and Loyals Rugby, the team was named for a yet-to-be-released drink, itself a portmanteau of "Gilchrist" and "martini". The Giltinis were based in El Segundo, California, and played at the Los Angeles Memorial Coliseum. Darren Coleman was their first head coach.

The club won the MLR Shield in their inaugural season, but were disqualified from the playoffs in 2022. The Giltinis and the Austin Gilgronis—another MLR team owned by Gilchrist—were removed from the league in October 2022.

== History ==
A potential Los Angeles expansion bid for MLR, led by LA Coast Rugby and Adam Gilchrist, was announced in 2018 with plans for the team to enter the league in 2019. The team's bid was later replaced by a new proposal from Loyals Rugby, who were announced as the winners of the expansion team in 2020. The team, named for a cocktail like the Austin Gilgronis, began play in 2021. In its first season, the Giltinis posted a 12–4 record, hosted, and defeated Rugby ATL in the MLR final, winning the shield.

During the 2022 season, MLR announced that the Giltinis and the Gilgronis—both owned by Gilchrist—were disqualified from the playoffs due to a violation of league rules, allegedly including salary cap issues. Gilchrist filed suit against the league in June 2022; the two teams were expelled from the league in October following a failed attempt to sell both teams.

== Stadium ==
The Giltinis played at the Los Angeles Memorial Coliseum, a multi-use stadium in Exposition Park, Los Angeles.

== Sponsorship ==
Season	Kit manufacturer	Shirt sponsor
2021–2022	Paladin Sports	None

== Personnel ==
=== Head coaches ===
- (Australia) Darren Coleman (2021)
- (Australia) Stephen Hoiles (2021–2022)

=== Assistant coaches ===
- (New Zealand) Orene Ai’i (Backs, 2021–2022)
- (Australia) Adam Ashley-Cooper (Backs, 2022)
- (Australia) Dave Dennis (Forwards, 2022)

=== Captains ===
- (Australia) Dave Dennis (2021–2022)

== Records ==
LA Giltinis won the Major League Rugby Championship Shield in their inaugural season (2021).

=== Season standings ===
Year	Pos	Pld	W	D	L	F	A	+/−	BP	Pts	Playoff results
2021	1st	16	12	0	4	545	305	+240	11	63	Won West Conference Final (Utah Warriors) 17–13; Won Major League Rugby final (Rugby ATL) 31-17
2022	2nd	16	11	0	5	468	340	+128	11	57	Disqualified

=== Honors ===
- Major League Rugby
  - Champions: 2021
  - Playoff appearances: 2021
