= 2017–18 European Rugby Continental Shield =

European Rugby Continental Shield (2017-2018)

European Rugby Continental Shield
- Sport: Rugby union
- Organisers: EPCR; Rugby Europe; FIR
- Number of teams: 10 (8 (pools) + 2 (play-off))
- Country: Italy; Georgia; Romania; Russia; Portugal; Germany
- Website: European Rugby Challenge Cup Qualifying Competition Website; Rugby Europe Website
- Related competitions: European Rugby Champions Cup; European Rugby Challenge Cup

The 2017–18 European Rugby Continental Shield is a rugby union competition, organised by European Professional Club Rugby, Rugby Europe and the Federazione Italiana Rugby, for entry into the European Rugby Challenge Cup.

== Format ==
The format of the Qualifying Competition remains similar to the previous season. As before, two places in the next year's Challenge Cup will be available for teams in the Continental Shield. Clubs from six countries will compete in the 2017/18 Continental Shield.

Four representatives from the Italian Eccellenza – Pataro Rugby Calvisano, Femi-CZ Rugby Rovigo, Rugby Petrarca and Rugby Viadana – will be joined by Romania's Timișoara Saracens, RC Batumi from Georgia, Heidelberger RK of Germany and Portugal's Centro Desportivo Universitario de Lisboa (CDUL Rugby) competing in two pools of four.

Following the pool stage matches, the winner of Pool A will play the runner-up in Pool B, and the winner of Pool B will play the runner-up in Pool A on a home and away basis.

The two clubs which advance will then play each other home and away with the winner securing a place in the Continental Shield final in Bilbao next May and also qualifying for the 2018/19 Challenge Cup.

The other Continental Shield finalist will be decided by a home and away play-off between Russia's Enisei-STM and Krasny Yar who have both received a bye into the knockout stage of the competition due to their participation in this season's Challenge Cup and to their success in last season's Continental Shield.

The winner of the Enisei-STM v Krasny Yar play-offs will go through to the Continental Shield final in Bilbao and will also qualify for the 2018/19 Challenge Cup.

The aim of the Continental Shield is to widen the footprint of club rugby across Europe and to give both emerging and established clubs in different territories the opportunity to qualify for the Challenge Cup.

Advances to Pool play-offs

Pool A	P	W	D	L	PF	PA	Diff	TB	LB	Pts
(Romania) Timișoara Saracens	4	3	0	1	106	68	+38	1	1	14
(Germany) Heidelberger RK	4	3	0	1	96	74	+22	1	0	13
(Italy) Rovigo	4	2	0	2	89	86	+3	2	1	11
(Italy) Viadana	4	1	0	3	66	128	-62	1	1	6

Pool B	P	W	D	L	PF	PA	Diff	TB	LB	Pts
(Italy) Calvisano	4	2	0	2	107	52	+55	2	2	12
(Georgia (country)) Batumi	4	2	0	2	107	95	+12	2	2	12
(Italy) Petrarca	4	2	0	2	99	69	+30	1	2	11
(Portugal) CDUL	4	1	0	3	43	142	-99	0	0	4

=== Fixtures ===
Matches

14 October 2017
15:00

Timișoara Saracens (Romania)	29 – 25	(Italy) Petrarca (BP)

Dan Paltinisanu Stadium, Timișoara
Referee: Lloyd Linton (Scotland)

14 October 2017
15:00

(BP) Rovigo (Italy)	31 – 27	(Georgia (country)) Batumi (2 BP)

Stadio Comunale Mario Battaglini, Rovigo
Referee: Maxime Burlet (Belgium)

14 October 2017
15:00

Heidelberger RK (Germany)	23 – 19	(Italy) Calvisano (BP)

Sportzentrum Süd, Heidelberg
Referee: Iñigo Atorrasagasti (Spain)

14 October 2017
15:00

(BP) Viadana (Italy)	14 – 19	(Portugal) CDUL

Stadio Luigi Zaffanella, Viadana
Referee: Nika Amashukeli (Georgia (country))

21 October 2017
15:00

(BP) Calvisano (Italy)	41 – 14	(Italy) Viadana

Centro Sportivo San Michele, Calvisano
Referee: Sam Grove White (Scotland)

21 October 2017
15:00

Petrarca (Italy)	18 – 13	(Italy) Rovigo (BP)

Centro Sportivo Plebiscito, Padua
Referee: Shota Tevzadze (Georgia (country))

21 October 2017
15:00

(BP) Batumi (Georgia (country))	33 – 16	(Germany) Heidelberger RK

Rugby Arena, Batumi
Referee: Maxime Burlet (Belgium)

21 October 2017
15:00

CDUL (Portugal)	10 – 45	(Romania) Timișoara Saracens (BP)

Estadio Universitario de Lisboa, Lisbon
Referee: Andrea Piardi (Italy)

9 December 2017
15:00

Heidelberger RK (Germany)	19 – 15	(Italy) Petrarca (BP)

Sportzentrum Süd, Heidelberg
Referee: Andrea Piardi (Italy)

9 December 2017
15:00

Timișoara Saracens (Romania)	15 – 13	(Italy) Calvisano (BP)

Dan Paltinisanu Stadium, Timișoara
Referee: Nika Amashukeli (Georgia (country))

9 December 2017
15:00

(BP) Viadana (Italy)	31 – 27	(Georgia (country)) Batumi (BP)

Stadio Luigi Zaffanella, Viadana
Referee: Iñigo Atorrasagasti (Spain)

9 December 2017
15:00

(BP) Rovigo (Italy)	45 – 7	(Portugal) CDUL

Stadio Comunale Mario Battaglini, Rovigo
Referee: Ben Blain (Scotland)

16 December 2017
15:00

(BP) Calvisano (Italy)	34 – 0	(Italy) Rovigo

Centro Sportivo San Michele, Calvisano
Referee: Lloyd Linton (Scotland)

16 December 2017
15:00

CDUL (Portugal)	7 – 38	(Germany) Heidelberger RK (BP)

Estadio Universitario de Lisboa, Lisbon
Referee: Shota Tevzadze (Georgia (country))

16 December 2017
12:00

Batumi (Georgia (country))	20 – 17	(Romania) Timișoara Saracens (BP)

Rugby Arena, Batumi
Referee: Keith Allen (Scotland)

16 December 2017
15:00

(BP) Petrarca (Italy)	41 – 7	(Italy) Viadana

Impianti Sportivi Memo Geremia, Padua
Referee: Andrea Piardi (Italy)

=== Pool play-offs ===
13 January 2018
15:00

Batumi (Georgia (country))	6 – 11	(Romania) Timișoara Saracens

Rugby Arena, Batumi

13 January 2018
15:00

Heidelberger RK (Germany)	34 – 29	(Italy) Calvisano

Sportzentrum Süd, Heidelberg

20 January 2018
14:00

Timișoara Saracens (Romania)	21 – 12	(Georgia (country)) Batumi

Cluj Arena, Cluj

Timișoara Saracens won 32–18 on aggregate.

20 January 2018
15:00

Calvisano (Italy)	13 – 17	(Germany) Heidelberger RK

Centro Sportivo San Michele, Calvisano

Heidelberger RK won 51–42 on aggregate.

=== Qualifying play-offs ===
31 March 2018

Enisey-STM (Russia)	47 – 22	(Russia) Krasny Yar

Trud Stadium, Krasnodar

31 March 2018

Timișoara Saracens (Romania)	26 – 20	(Germany) Heidelberger RK

Stadionul Dan Păltinișanu, Timișoara
Attendance: 3212

21 April 2018

Krasny Yar (Russia)	26 – 27	(Russia) Enisey-STM

Krasny Yar Stadium, Krasnoyarsk

Enisey-STM won 74–48 on aggregate.

21 April 2018

Heidelberger RK (Germany)	27 – 15	(Romania) Timișoara Saracens

Sportzentrum Süd, Heidelberg

Heidelberger RK won 47–41 on aggregate.

=== Continental Shield Final ===
12 May 2018

Enisey-STM (Russia)	24 – 20	(Germany) Heidelberger RK

Campos Deportivos de Fadura, Getxo, Biscay
