= John Senio =

Samoa international rugby union player (born 1982)

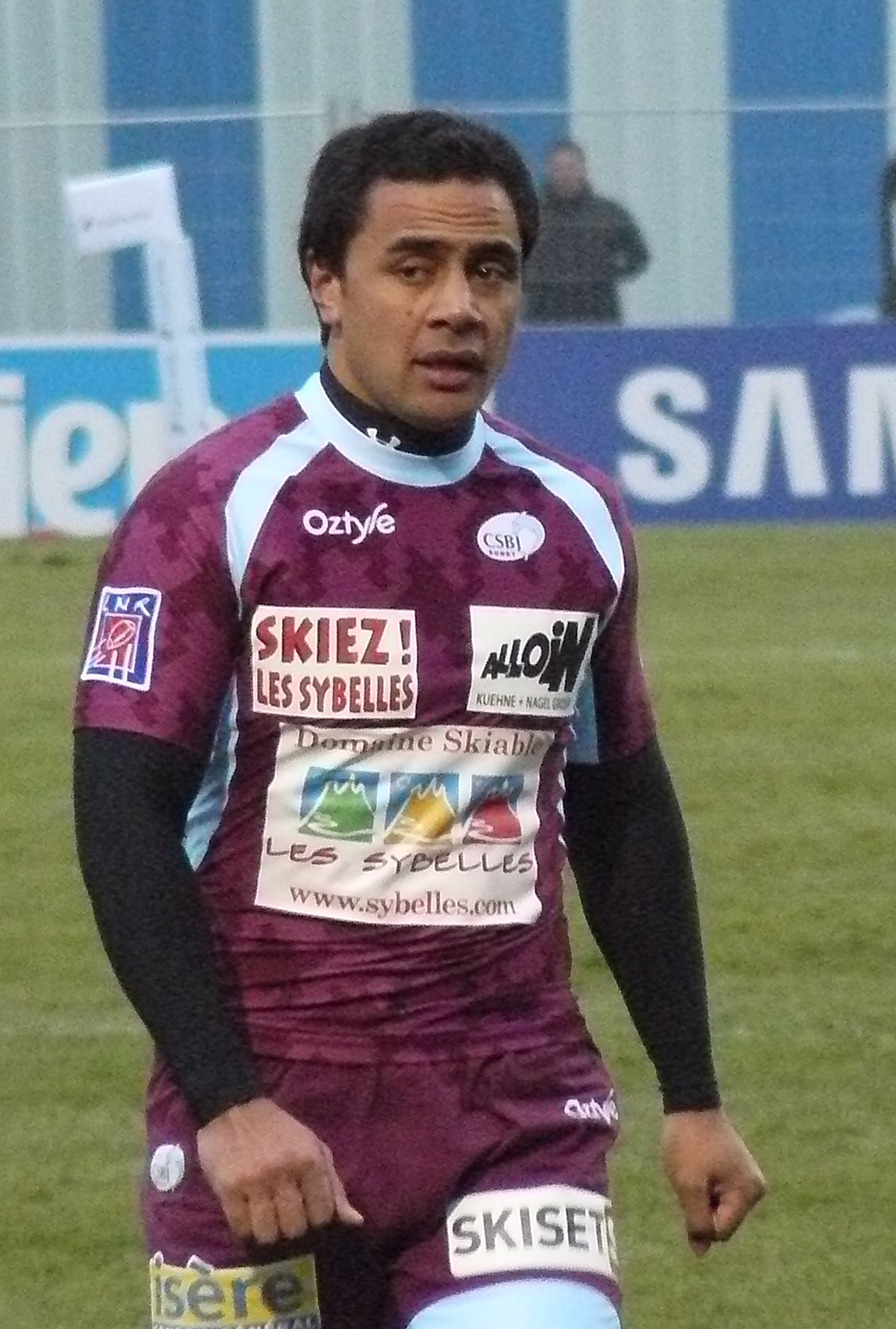
- Senio playing for Bourgoin-Jallieu
- Born: 10 September 1982 (age 44)
- Height: 6 ft 0 in (1.83 m)
- Weight: 202 lb (92 kg)
- School: Kelston Boys' High School

Rugby union career
- Position: Scrumhalf
Senior career
Years	Team	Apps	(Points)
2006–2007	Edinburgh Rugby		
2007–2009	Clermont		
2009–2010	Bourgoin		
2010–2011	FC Grenoble		
Provincial / State sides
Years	Team	Apps	(Points)
–2006	Northland		
Super Rugby
Years	Team	Apps	(Points)
2005–06	Blues	15	(5)
International career
Years	Team	Apps	(Points)
2004-2006	Samoa	10	(10)

John Senio (born 10 September 1982) is a Samoan rugby union footballer. He last played for French club FC Grenoble in the Pro D2. Prior to signing with Grenoble he played for Bourgoin ASM Clermont Auvergne, Edinburgh Rugby in the Celtic League and the New Zealand franchise the Blues in the Super 14. He has also played for the Samoan national team, and was a member of their 2003 Rugby World Cup squad. His brothers Kevin Senio and Dimitri Senio are also professional rugby players. He was a CS Bourgoin-Jallieu rugby player for the 2009/2010 season.
