= Graeme Cameron =

New Zealand footballer

Personal information
- Full name: Graeme Cameron
- Place of birth: New Zealand
- Position: Forward

Senior career*
Years	Team	Apps	(Gls)
- Waitakere City

International career
1990	New Zealand	2	(0)
- * Club domestic league appearances and goals

Graeme Cameron is a former association football player who represented New Zealand at international level.

== Career ==
Cameron played two official A-international matches for the New Zealand in 1990, both against China, the first in a 2–1 win on 16 August, the second a 1–0 win on 24 August 1990.
