= Andrew Suniula =

US international rugby union & league player/current coach

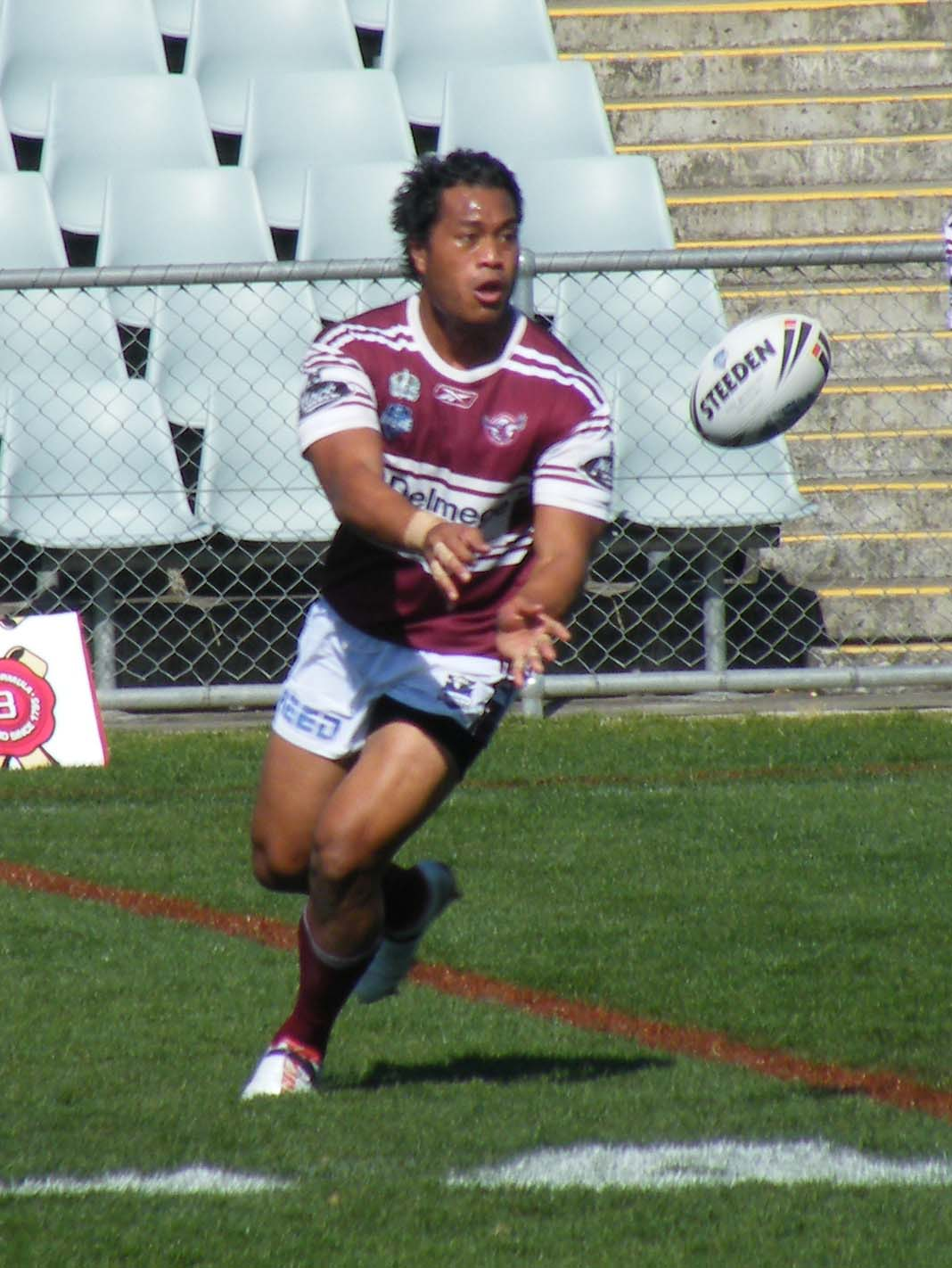
- Born: 1 May 1982 (age 44) American Samoa
- Height: 1.86 m (6 ft 1 in)
- Weight: 102 kg (16 st 1 lb; 225 lb)
- Notable relative(s): Roland Suniula (brother), Shalom Suniula (brother)

Rugby union career
- Position(s): Centre, Wing
- Current team: Austin Elite
Senior career
Years	Team	Apps	(Points)
2005–2006	Taranaki	11	(5)
2011–2012	Cornish Pirates	15	(15)
2013–2014	Wasps	5	(0)
2015	București	6	(5)
2016	San Diego Breakers	9	(5)
2018–2019	Austin Elite	15	(14)
- Correct as of 27 November 2020
International career
Years	Team	Apps	(Points)
2008–2016	United States	39	(35)
- Correct as of 30 December 2017
- Rugby league career

Playing information
- Position: Second-row, Wing, Centre
Club
Years	Team	Pld	T	G	FG	P
2007	Auckland Lions
2007–09	Manly Sea Eagles	4				12
	Total	4	0	0	0	12

Andrew Suniula (born 1 May 1982) is a former rugby football player who played rugby union as a centre for the United States national team (USA Eagles XV's). He last played for the Austin Gilgronis and is now their Rugby Operations Director and a member of the coaching staff.

== Early career ==
Suniula began playing professional rugby union with Taranaki during the 2005–06 season, playing in eight times for the club.

== Rugby league ==
Suniula switched to play rugby league for the Auckland Lions in the 2007 Bartercard Cup, scoring a try in the Grand Final. There he was spotted by Noel Cleal and signed by Manly-Warringah Sea Eagles. Suniula played for Manly in the NRL. Suniula played wing, centre and second-row in rugby league.

== Rugby union ==
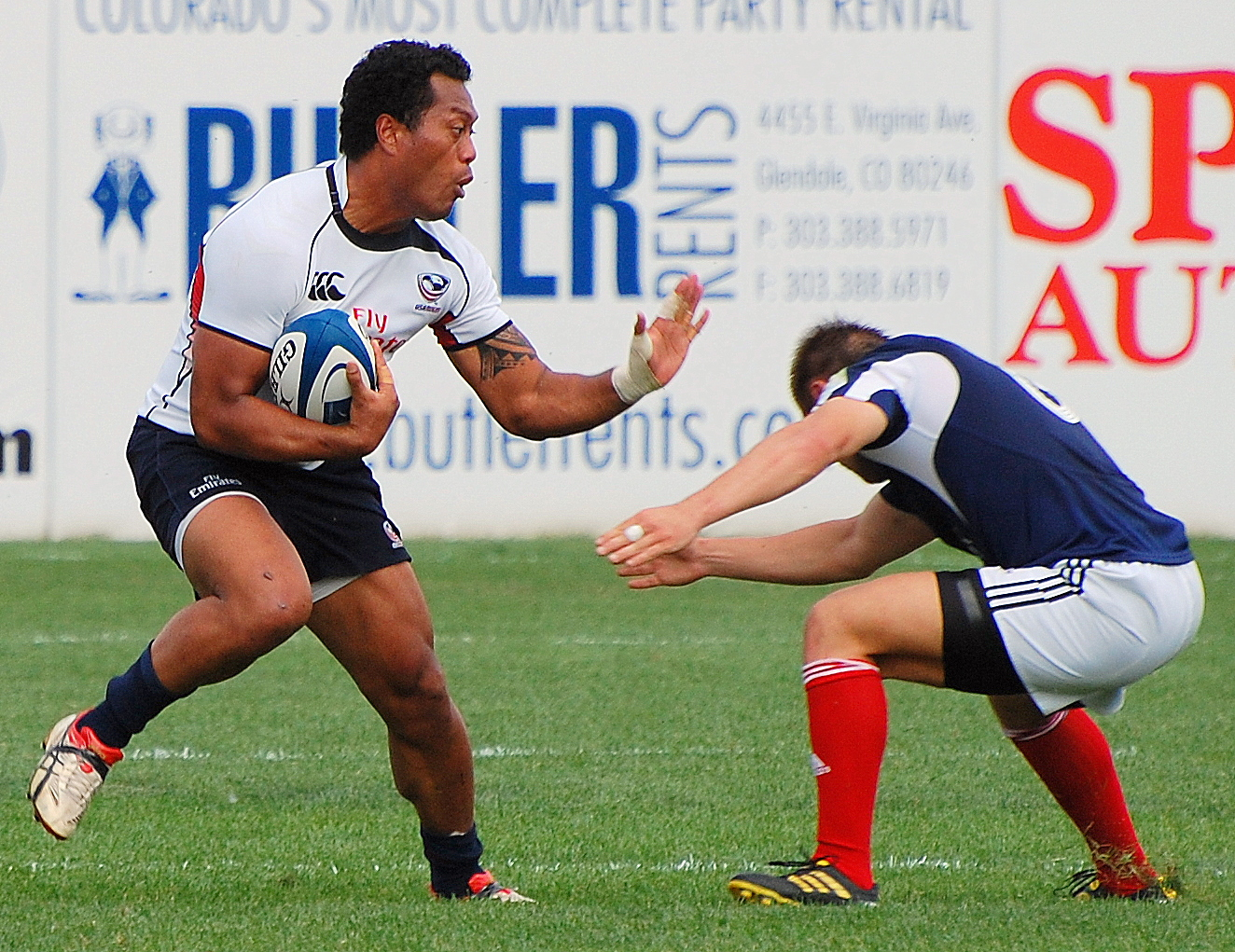
Suniula with the US in the 2010 Churchill Cup

After four years in rugby league, Suniula returned to union with the Chicago Griffins in 2010. The following season he joined RFU Championship side Cornish Pirates, appearing 16 times for the club during the 2011–12 season. Suniula returned to Chicago Griffins the following season before joining his first top flight professional rugby union side when he signed for the London Wasps for the 2013–14 season. He made five appearances for the club during his brief one-year stint. Suniula joined CSM București for the 2015 Romanian Rugby Championship season.

In 2018, Suniola signed for Austin Elite and quickly became team captain, but by 2019 he was semi-retired and was succeeded as captain by Ben Mitchell.

== International career ==
Suniula represented the United States in rugby union from 2008 to 2016 and played 39 tests including four matches in the 2011 and 2015 World Cups.

== Personal life ==
His brothers, Roland and Shalom, have also represented the United States in rugby union. Suniula has been tattooed by internationally renowned artist Steve Ma Ching, who also tattooed rugby players DJ Forbes and Sonny Bill Williams.
