= Kevin Senio =

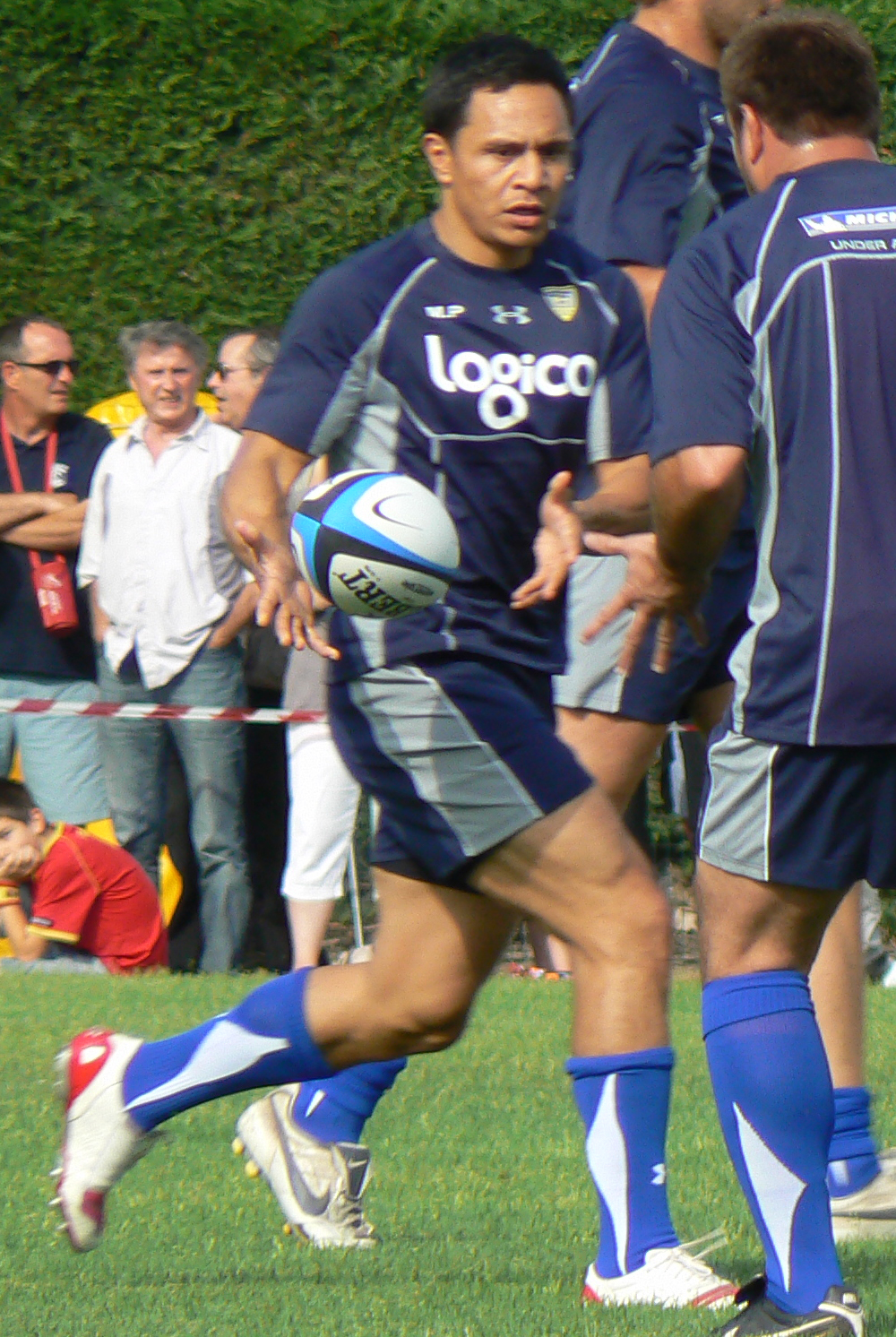
- Senio training for Clermont
- Born: Kevin Senio; 6 July 1978 (age 48) New Zealand
- Height: 1.78 m (5 ft 10 in)
- Weight: 90 kg (14 st 2 lb)
- Notable relative: John Senio

Rugby union career
- Position: Half-back
Senior career
Years	Team	Apps	(Points)
2007–2009	Castres	42	(10)
2009–	Clermont	58	(20)
Provincial / State sides
Years	Team	Apps	(Points)
2001	Auckland	9	
2002	Counties Manukau	8	
- Bay of Plenty
2003–2005	Canterbury	22	
Super Rugby
Years	Team	Apps	(Points)
2003–2005	Chiefs	9	(0)
2006–2007	Crusaders	25	(10)
International career
Years	Team	Apps	(Points)
2005	New Zealand	1	(0)

Kevin Senio (born July 6, 1978) is a former New Zealand rugby union professional who most recently played professionally for ASM Clermont Auvergne. He is currently the head coach of Ponsonby Rugby club, based in Auckland, New Zealand. Senio is also a former All Black, making his debut after coming on for Piri Weepu against Australia in New Zealand's 34–24 win in the final match of the 2005 Tri Nations Series and is currently a Junior All Black. That is Senio's only test thus far into his career. During his time at Bay of Plenty, Senio played in a tour match against the British & Irish Lions and was later called into the Junior All Blacks tour of Australia against Australia A.

Senio signed a two-year deal with the Canterbury Rugby Football Union (CRFU) on 26 September 2005, making him eligible to play for the Crusaders, after former Canterbury and Crusaders half-back, Justin Marshall, left to play in England following the 2005 British & Irish Lions tour to New Zealand. Senio also left after playing second fiddle to starting Chiefs' half-back, Byron Kelleher, who is also an All Black.

After being the starting scrum-half for the first part of the season, Senio found himself battling it out for regular game time with rookie Andy Ellis. However, Ellis was injured in the semi-final against the Bulls and Senio started the 2006 Super 14 Final against the Hurricanes. The day after the final, Senio was selected for the Junior All Blacks to play in the inaugural Pacific Five Nations tournament.

He was a replacement in the final as Clermont won the Top 14 title in 2009–10.

Senio has also represented NZ at age grade level, NZ Schools u/19 and u/21 and has also represented the NZ 7's team. Senio is married to Silver Fern Anna Senio and is brother to CS Bourgoin-Jallieu scrum-half John Senio. Senio is also the brother of Dimitri Senio, who plays rugby union in France for SC Albi.
