= Sam Harris (rugby, born 1980) =

NZ rugby league & union player

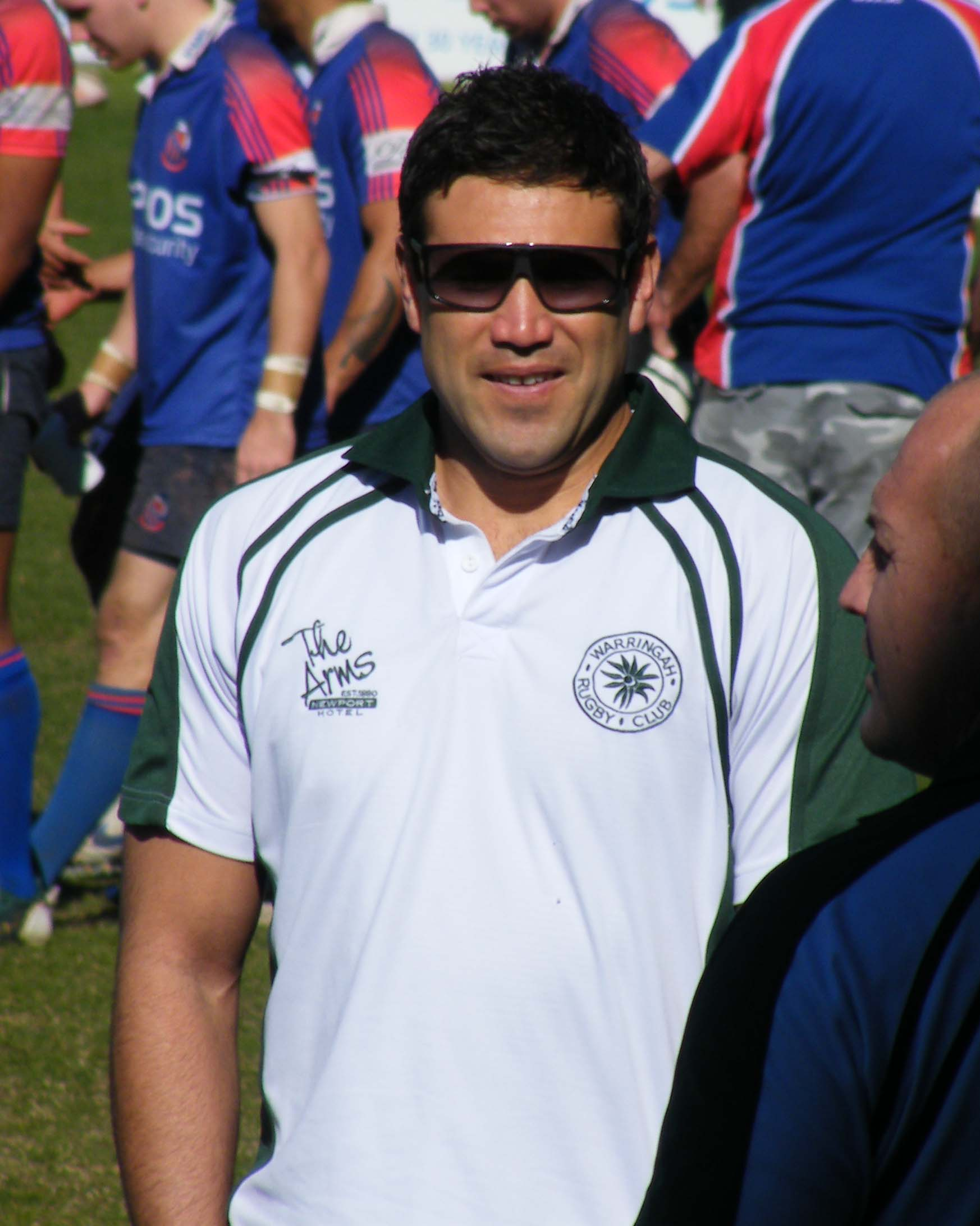

Personal information
- Full name: Sam Richard Harris
- Born: 30 January 1980 (age 46) Auckland, New Zealand

Playing information
- Height: 190 cm (6 ft 3 in)
- Weight: 103 kg (16 st 3 lb)

Rugby league
- Position: Second-row
Club
Years	Team	Pld	T	G	FG	P
2003–05	Manly Sea Eagles	59	10	3	0	46
2006	Wests Tigers	5	0	0	0	0
	Total	64	10	3	0	46
Representative
Years	Team	Pld	T	G	FG	P
2004	City NSW	1	0	0	0	0

Rugby union
- Position: Inside Centre
Club
Years	Team	Pld	T	G	FG	P
2001–2002; 2007–2008; 2007; 2008/2009; 2010	NSW Waratahs; NSW Waratahs; Central Coast Rays; Honda Heat; Western Force	16; 20; 10; 9; 9	2; 2; 0; 1; 0	0; 0; 0; 0; 0	0; 0; 0; 0; 0	10; 10; 0; 5; 0

Samuel Richard Harris (born 30 January 1980) is a New Zealand-born Australian former professional rugby footballer. He was previously head coach of the Chicago Hounds of Major League Rugby (MLR). He is of New Zealand Maori descent.

Harris played representative rugby league for City NSW and in the National Rugby League for the Manly-Warringah Sea Eagles and Wests Tigers clubs. His usual position was in the second row. He also played rugby union for the NSW Waratahs and Western Force in the Super 14 competition and the Warringah Rats and Manly Marlins in the Shute Shield and for the Central Coast Rays in the ARC competition.

Harris' only representative appearance in rugby league came in 2004 when he played for City in the annual City v. Country match. His first match for the Wests Tigers was their loss to the Bradford Bulls in the 2006 World Club Challenge.

He returned to rugby union in 2007 when he signed on with the Waratahs franchise for the 2007 Super 14 competition playing at centre. At the conclusion of the 2008 season Harris went to Japan to play for Honda Heat for a season before returning to Australia and playing for the Western Force in the 2010. At the conclusion of the 2010 season he retired from playing.

== Coaching ==
Harris moved into coaching and started his coaching career with the Warringah Rats in 2011. In 2013 he left the Rats after 2 seasons as head coach. He then returned to Japan and the Honda Heat to be an assistant coach for 4 seasons before moving onto Ricoh Black Rams to be an assistant coach for 3 seasons. At the conclusion of the 2020 season he moved to Austin Gilgronis to be their head coach for 2 seasons before moving onto the Chicago Hounds to be their head coach for 2 seasons.

== Career highlights ==
- Junior Club: Avalon Bulldogs
- First Grade Debut: Round 10, Manly v Parramatta at Brookvale Oval, 18 May 2003
- First Grade Record: 64 appearances scoring 10 tries & 3 goals
