= Alain Hyardet =

France international rugby union player & coach (born 1964)

- Born: 28 November 1964 (age 61) Aix-en-Provence, France
- Height: 5 ft 9 in (175 cm)
- Weight: 178 lb (81 kg)

Rugby union career
- Position: Centre
International career
Years	Team	Apps	(Points)
1995	France	2	(0)

Alain Hyardet (born 28 November 1964) is a French rugby union coach and former player.

Born in Aix-en-Provence, Hyardet was a centre and played with AS Béziers from 1986 to 1994. It was after moving to Castres Olympique that he earned a France call up, featuring twice in the 1995 Latin Cup competition in Argentina, against Italy and the home side. He got a taste of European rugby in the 1995–96 Heineken Cup, before retiring as a player.

Hyardet has coached USA Perpignan, AS Béziers and Montpellier RC in French rugby, as well as Austin Elite for two seasons of Major League Rugby. His son Julien was a professional rugby player.

== See also ==
- List of France national rugby union players
