= Dave Dennis (rugby union) =

Australian rugby union player

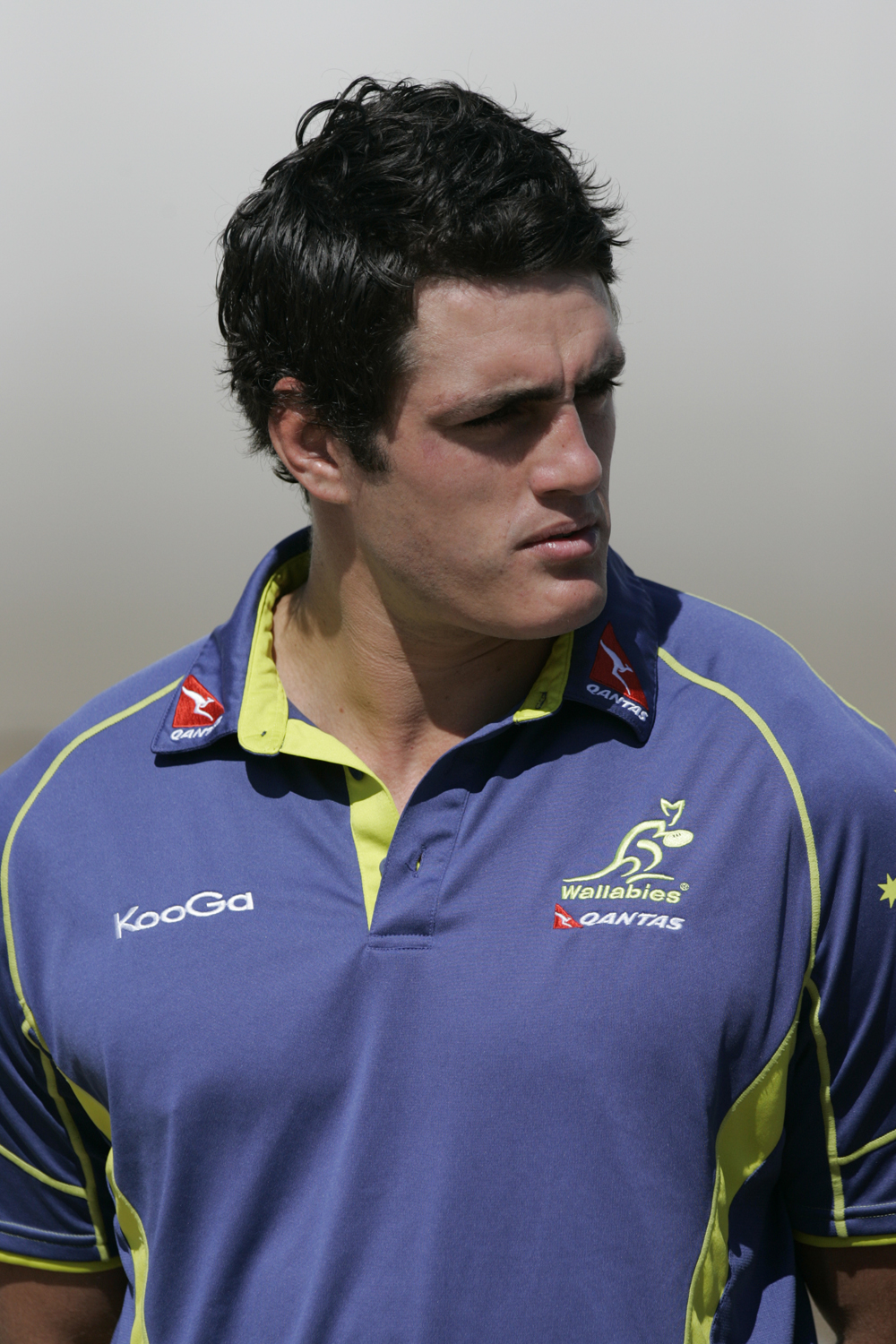
- Dave Dennis in October 2012
- Born: David Andrew Dennis; 10 January 1986 (age 40) Sydney, Australia
- Height: 193 cm (6 ft 4 in)
- Weight: 114 kg (17 st 13 lb)
- School: Richmond High School
- University: Sydney University
- Notable relative: Mark Gerrard (brother in law)

Rugby union career
- Position: Lock/Flanker/Number 8
- Current team: Sydney University
Senior career
Years	Team	Apps	(Points)
2007	Rebels	5	(0)
2015	Sydney Stars	2	(0)
2016–2020	Exeter Chiefs	80	(45)
2021–2022	LA Giltinis	30	(10)
- Correct as of 5 December 2023
Super Rugby
Years	Team	Apps	(Points)
2007–2016	Waratahs	106	(50)
- Correct as of 21 June 2016
International career
Years	Team	Apps	(Points)
2012–2013	Australia	18	(0)
2004	Australian Schoolboys	4	(0)
- Correct as of 24 February 2021

Dave Dennis (born 20 January 1986) is a retired Australian rugby union player who last played professionally for the LA Giltinis of Major League Rugby (MLR) in the United States. His primary positions were lock or blindside flanker, but he also played No.8.

== Early life ==
He was educated at Richmond High School in Sydney, when he played in the Australian Schoolboys Rugby team in 2004.

== Waratahs ==
Dennis' Waratahs debut was against the Crusaders, in 2007. In March 2013, Dennis became Waratahs captain.

== Exeter Chiefs ==
In 2016 he joined Exeter Chiefs. He started the final as Exeter Chiefs defeated Wasps to be crowned champions of the 2016–17 English Premiership.
