= Caesars Superdome =

Stadium in New Orleans, Louisiana

- The Superdome

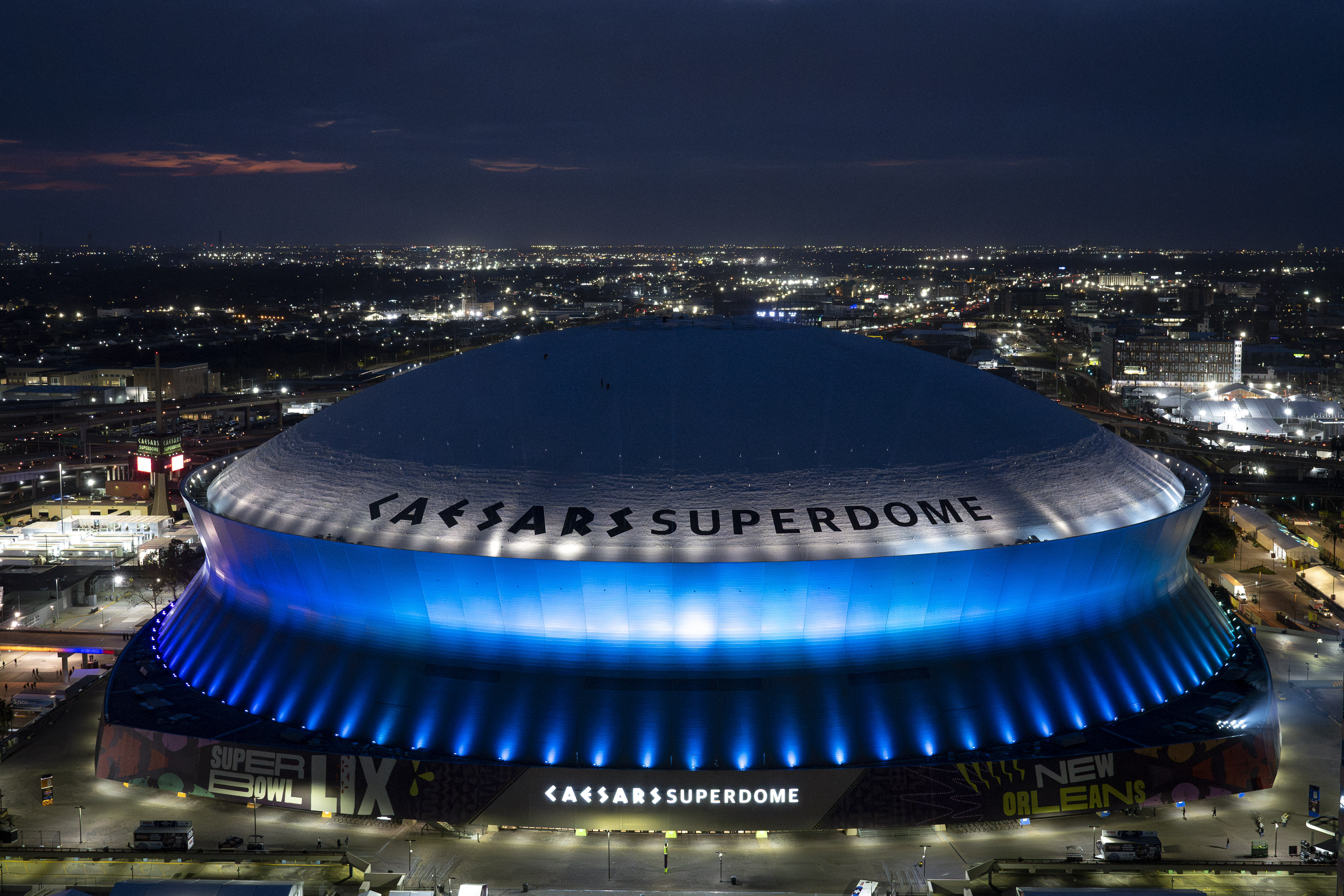
- The Superdome in 2025, prior to Super Bowl LIX

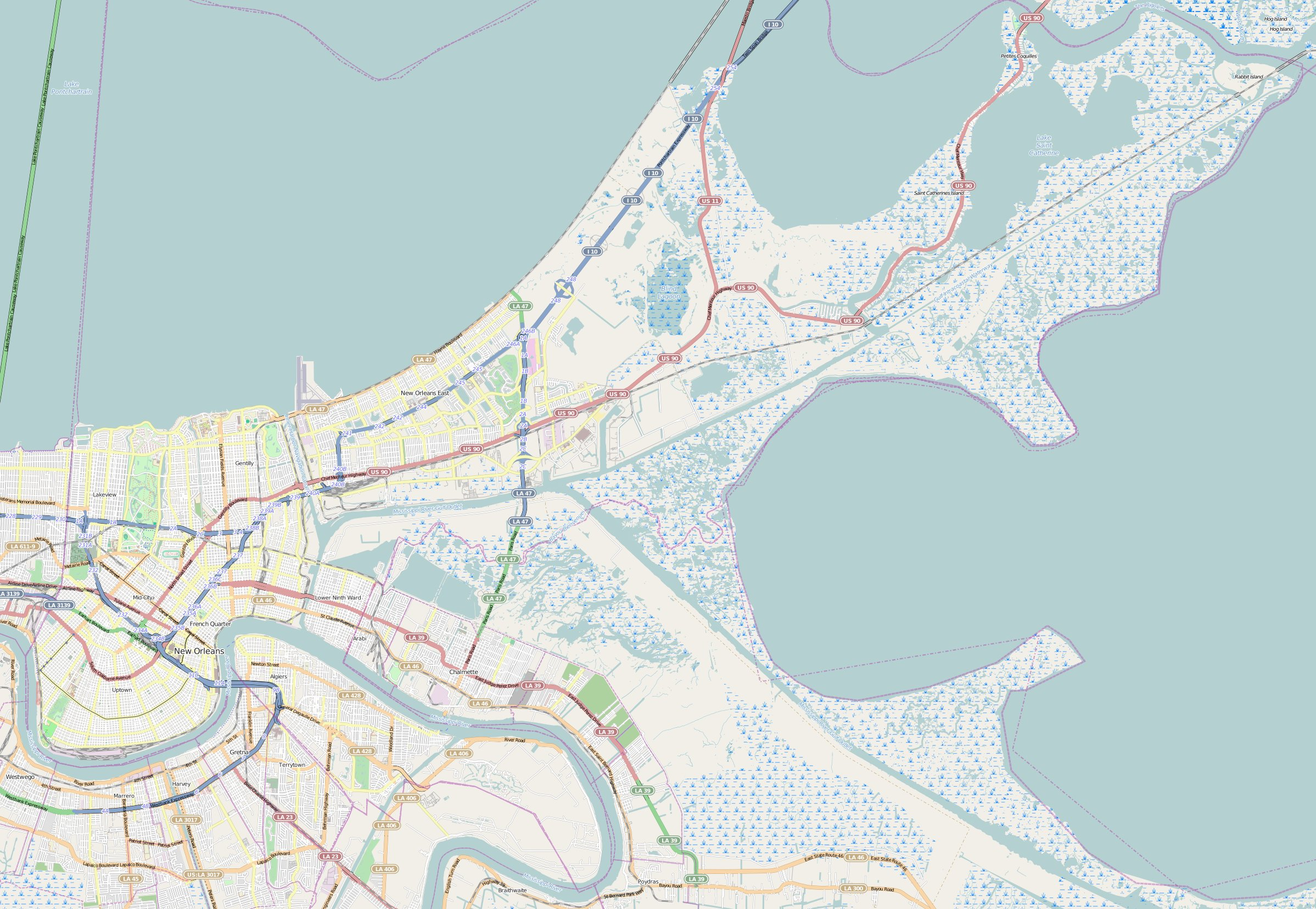
- Location in the United States Location in Louisiana Location in New Orleans
- Former names: Louisiana Superdome (1975–2011); Mercedes-Benz Superdome (2011–2021)
- Address: 1500 Sugar Bowl Drive
- Location: New Orleans, Louisiana, U.S.
- Coordinates: 29°57′3″N 90°4′52″W
- Owner: The Louisiana Stadium and Exposition District
- Operator: Legends Global
- Capacity: Football: 73,208 (expandable to 76,468); Basketball: 73,432; Baseball: 56,941
- Roof: Dome
- Surface: Monsanto "Mardi Grass" turf (1975–2003); FieldTurf (2003–2006); Sportexe Momentum Turf (2006–2009); UBU Speed Series S5 (2010–2016); Act Global UBU Speed S5-M Synthetic Turf (2017–2018); Turf Nation S5 (2019–present)
- Record attendance: 78,133 (WrestleMania 34, April 8, 2018)
- Public transit: 46 Poydras Street; New Orleans Union Passenger Terminal

Construction
- Groundbreaking: August 12, 1971 (55 years ago)
- Opened: August 3, 1975; 51 years ago
- Reopened: September 25, 2006
- Cost: US$134 million (Initial) ($802 million in 2025 dollars) Renovations: US$193 million (2005–06 repairs) ($308 million in 2025 dollars)
- Architects: Curtis and Davis Associated; Edward B. Silverstein & Associates; Nolan, Norman & Nolan

Tenant
- List: New Orleans Saints (NFL) 1975–2004, 2006–present; Sugar Bowl (NCAA) 1975–present; Tulane Green Wave (NCAA) 1975–2004, 2006–2013; New Orleans Jazz (NBA) 1975–1979; New Orleans Pelicans (AA) 1977; New Orleans Breakers (USFL) 1984; New Orleans Night (AFL) 1991–1992; New Orleans Bowl (NCAA) 2001–present

Website
- caesarssuperdome.com
- Louisiana Superdome
- U.S. National Register of Historic Places
- NRHP reference No.: 15001004
- Designated: January 27, 2016

Caesars Superdome (Note: Originally known as the Louisiana Superdome and formerly Mercedes-Benz Superdome) commonly known as the Superdome, is an indoor stadium in New Orleans, Louisiana, U.S. It has served as the home venue of the New Orleans Saints of the National Football League (NFL) since its opening in 1975.

Plans to build the Superdome were drawn up in 1967 by the New Orleans modernist architectural firm of Curtis and Davis and the building opened as the Louisiana Superdome in 1975. Its steel frame covers a 13-acre (5.3 ha) expanse and the 273-foot (83 m) dome is made of a lamellar multi-ringed frame and has a diameter of 680 feet (207 m), making it the largest fixed domed structure in the world.

The Superdome has hosted eight Super Bowls (the most of any stadium as of 2025's Super Bowl LIX), and six NCAA championships in men's college basketball. In college football, the Sugar Bowl has been played at the Superdome since 1975, which is one of the "New Year's Six" bowl games of the College Football Playoff and the 2020 National Championship. It also traditionally hosts the Bayou Classic, a rivalry game played between the historically black universities Southern University and Grambling State University. The Superdome was also the long-time home of the Tulane Green Wave football team of Tulane University until 2014 when they returned to Yulman Stadium on their campus, and was the home venue of the New Orleans Jazz of the National Basketball Association (NBA) from 1975 until 1979.

In 2005, the Superdome housed thousands of people seeking shelter from Hurricane Katrina. The building suffered extensive damage as a result of the storm, and was closed for more than a year afterward. The building was repaired and reopened in time for the Saints' 2006 home opener on September 25.

== History ==
=== Planning ===
Local businessman David Dixon (who later founded the United States Football League in the 1980s) conceived the Superdome while lobbying the NFL to award a franchise to New Orleans. After hosting several exhibition games at Tulane Stadium during typical New Orleans summer thunderstorms, NFL Commissioner Pete Rozelle told Dixon the NFL would never expand into New Orleans without a domed stadium. Dixon then won the support of the governor of Louisiana, John McKeithen. When they toured the Astrodome in Houston, Texas in 1966, McKeithen said, "I want one of these, only bigger". Bonds were passed for construction of the Superdome on November 8, 1966, seven days after commissioner Pete Rozelle awarded New Orleans the 25th professional football franchise.

The stadium was conceptualized as a multifunctional stadium for football, baseball, and basketball—with movable field level stands arranged specifically for each sport and areas with dirt (for the bases and pitcher's mound) covered with metal plates on the stadium floor (covered by artificial turf during football games)—and there are also meeting rooms that could be rented for many different purposes. Dixon imagined staging side-by-side high school football games and suggested the synthetic surface be white. Blount International of Montgomery, Alabama, was chosen to build the stadium.

During construction, various individuals developed eccentric models of the structure: one of sugar, another of pennies. The so-called "penny model" traveled to the Philadelphia Bicentennial '76 exhibition. New Orleanian Norman J. Kientz built the model with 2,697 pennies and donated it to the Superdome Board of Commissioners in April 1974.

It was hoped the stadium would be ready for the 1972 NFL season, and the final cost would come to $46 million. Instead, due to political delays, construction started on August 11, 1971, and finished in August 1975, seven months after Super Bowl IX was scheduled to be played in the stadium. The Super Bowl was played for a third time at Tulane Stadium in January 1975, in cold and rainy conditions. Factoring in inflation, construction delays, and increased transportation costs caused by the 1973 oil crisis, the final price tag skyrocketed to $165 million. Along with the state police, Elward Thomas Brady, Jr., a state representative from Terrebonne Parish conducted an investigation into possible financial irregularities, but the Superdome went forward despite the obstacles.

=== Early history (1975–2004) ===
The New Orleans Saints moved into the Superdome in 1975; the home opener on September 28 was a 21–0 shutout loss to the Cincinnati Bengals in the first regular-season game in the facility. Tulane Stadium, the original home of the Saints, was condemned for destruction on the day the Superdome opened.

The first Super Bowl played in the stadium was Super Bowl XII in January 1978, the first in prime time.

The original artificial turf playing surface in the Superdome was produced and developed by Monsanto (which made the first artificial playing surface for sports, AstroTurf) specifically for the Superdome, and was named "Mardi Grass".

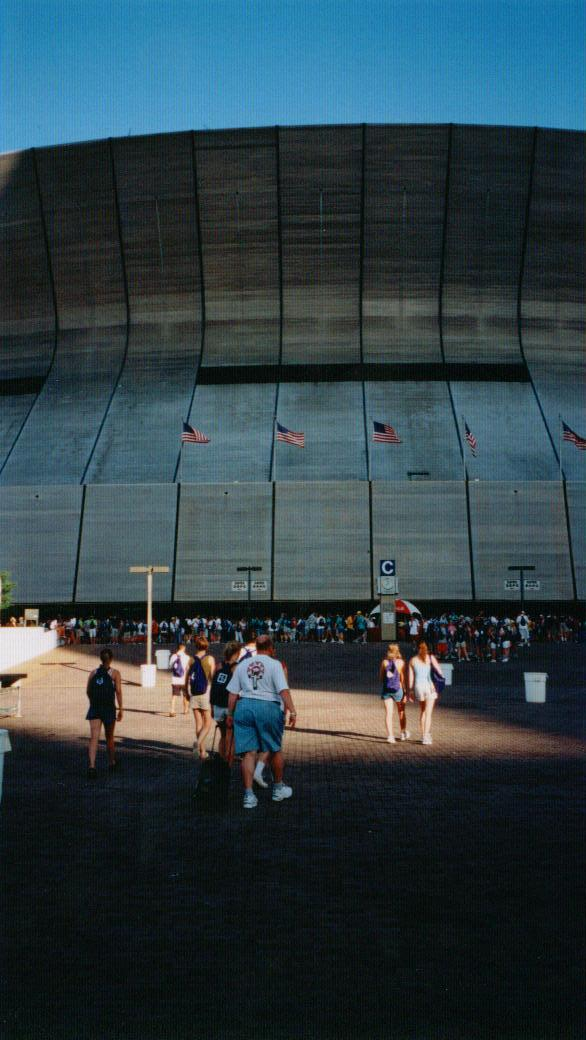
The exterior of the Superdome during the 2001 National Lutheran Youth Gathering

The Superdome replaced the first generation "Mardi Grass" surface with the next-generation infilled FieldTurf midway through the 2003 season, on November 16.

=== Shelter of last resort during Hurricane Katrina ===
The Superdome was used as a "shelter of last resort" for those in New Orleans unable to evacuate from Hurricane Katrina when it struck on August 29, 2005. During the storm, a large section of the outer covering was peeled off by high winds. The photos of the damage, in which the concrete underneath was exposed, quickly became an iconic image of Hurricane Katrina. Following the evacuation, the dome remained closed until September 25, 2006.

By August 31, there had been three deaths in the Superdome: two elderly medical patients and a man who was believed to have committed suicide by jumping from the upper-level seats. There were also unconfirmed reports of rape, vandalism, violent assaults, crack dealing and drug abuse, and gang activity inside the Superdome. After a National Guardsman was attacked and shot in the dark by an assailant, the National Guard inside the Superdome used barbed wire barricades to separate themselves from the other people in the dome. On September 11, New Orleans Police Superintendent Eddie Compass reported there were "no confirmed reports of any type of sexual assault."

United States Navy sniper Chris Kyle claimed that during the hurricane, he and another sniper climbed to the top of the dome and killed 30 armed looters during the chaos following the event. This claim has never been independently verified, and there is no evidence of dozens of people being slain by a sniper, with commentators noting that it was unlikely 30 people could have been killed without anyone noticing it or reporting it to the media or the police. Kyle's story had been reported in a number of publications, including the New Yorker, with Kyle relating the story to other military personnel.

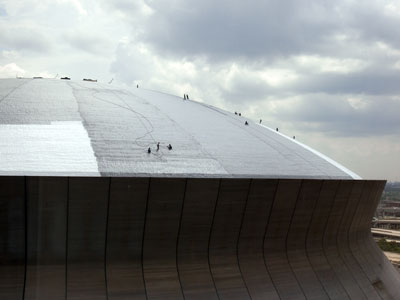
Contractors repair the roof to prepare for the reopening of the Superdome. (July 10, 2006)

The Superdome cost $185 million to repair and refurbish. To repair the Superdome, FEMA put up $115 million, the state spent $13 million, the Louisiana Stadium & Exposition District refinanced a bond package to secure $41 million and the NFL contributed $15 million.

After being damaged from the flooding disaster, a new Sportexe Momentum Turf surface was installed for the 2006 season.

During Super Bowl XL on February 5, 2006, the NFL announced that the Saints would play their home opener on September 24, 2006 in the Superdome against the Atlanta Falcons. The game was later moved to September 25.

The reopening of the dome was celebrated with festivities including a free outdoor concert by the Goo Goo Dolls before fans were allowed in; a pre-game performance by U2 and Green Day performing a cover of the Skids' "The Saints Are Coming", and a coin toss conducted by then-President George W. Bush. In front of ESPN's largest-ever audience at that time, the Saints won the game 23–3 with 70,003 in attendance, and went on to a successful season, reaching their first ever NFC Championship Game.

=== 2008–present ===
==== Further renovations ====
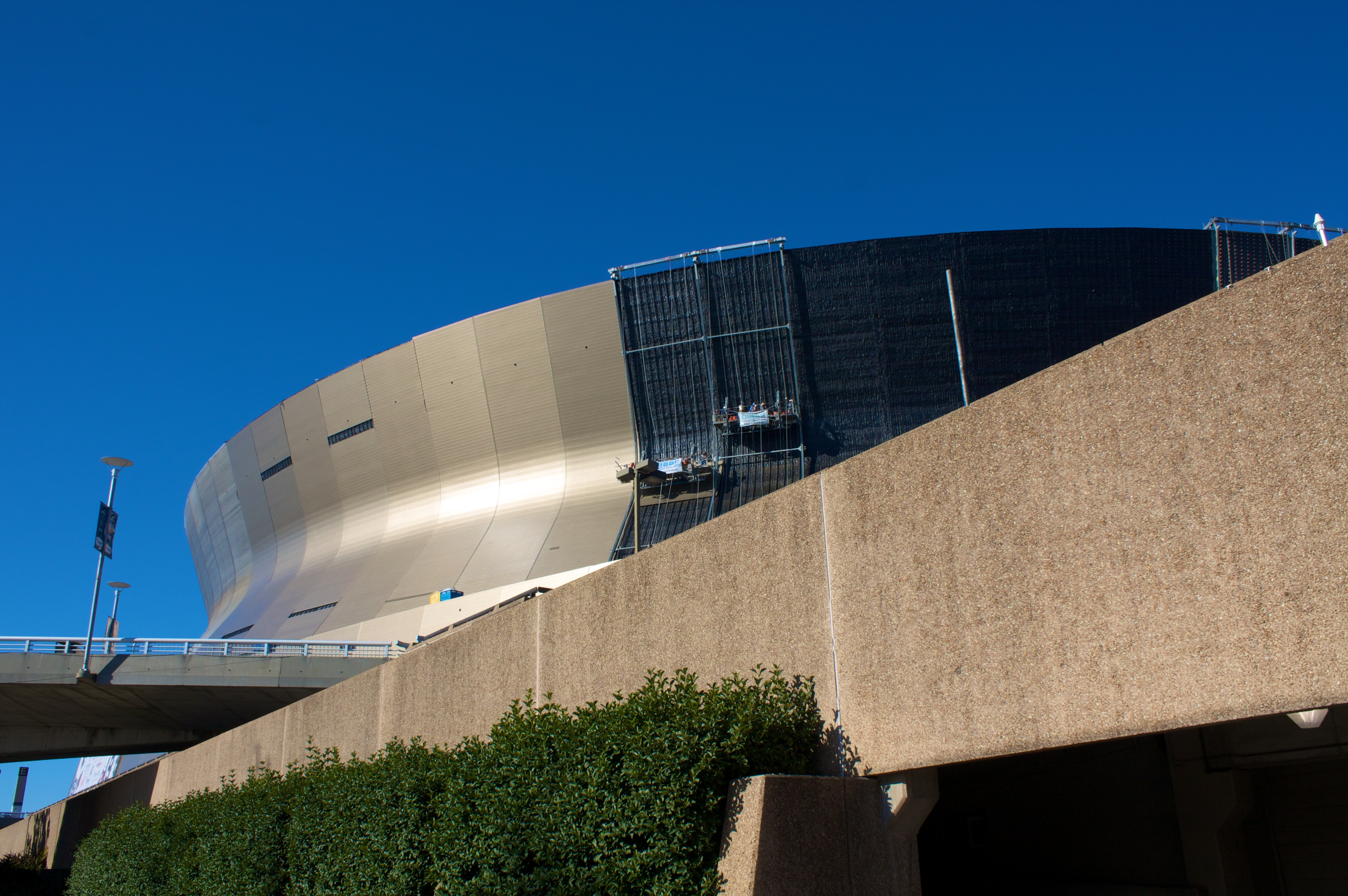
Construction workers replace the Superdome's 30-plus-year-old siding.

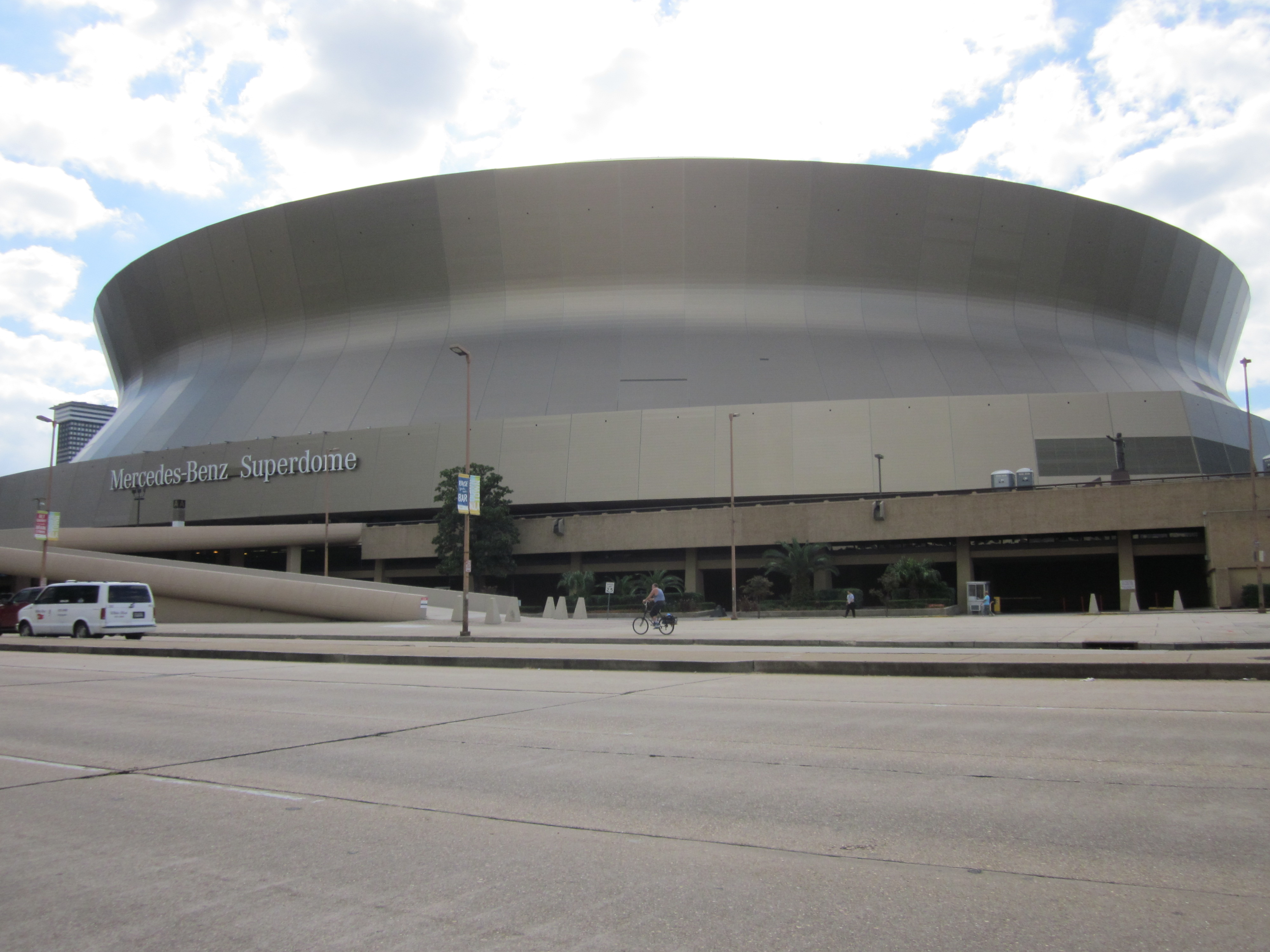
The inscription "Mercedes-Benz Superdome" went onto the sides of the stadium in late October 2011.

In 2008, new windows were installed to bring natural light into the building. Later that year, the roof-facing of the Superdome was also remodeled, restoring the roof with a solid white hue. Between 2009 and 2010, the entire outer layer of the stadium, more than 400,000 square feet (37,000 m^{2}) of aluminum siding, was replaced with new aluminum panels and insulation, returning the building to its original champagne bronze colored exterior. An innovative barrier system for drainage was also added, allowing the dome to resemble its original facade.

In addition, escalators were added to the outside of the club rooms. Each suite includes modernized rooms with raised ceilings, leather sofas, and flat-screen TVs, as well as glass brushed aluminum and wood-grain furnishings. A new $600,000 point-of-sale system was also installed, allowing fans to purchase concessions with credit cards throughout the stadium for the first time.

During the summer of 2010, the Superdome installed 111,831 square feet (10,389.4 m^{2}) of the UBU Speed S5-M synthetic turf system, an Act Global brand. In 2017 Act Global installed a new turf in time for the NFL season. For the 2018, 2019, and 2020 NFL seasons, Turf Nation Inc located in Dalton, Georgia, have supplied the synthetic turf system for the Superdome. The Superdome has, as of 2017, the largest continuous synthetic turf system in the NFL.

Beginning in 2011, demolition and new construction began to the lower bowl of the stadium, reconfiguring it to increase seating by 3,500, widening the plaza concourse, building two bunker club lounges and adding additional concession stands. Crews tore down the temporary stairs that led from Champions Square to the Dome, and replaced them with permanent steps. Installation of express elevators that take coaches and media from the ground level of the stadium to the press box were also completed. New 7,500-square-foot (700 m^{2}) bunker lounges on each side of the stadium were built. The lounges are equipped with flat-screen TVs, granite counter tops and full-service bars. These state-of-the-art lounges can serve 4,500 fans, whose old plaza seats were upgraded to premium tickets, giving those fans leather chairs with cup-holders. The plaza level was extended, closing in space between the concourse and plaza seating, adding new restrooms and concession areas. The renovations also ended the stadium's ability to convert to a baseball configuration. The renovations were completed in late June 2011 in time for the Essence Music Festival.

==== Naming rights ====
Naming rights to the Superdome were sold for the first time in 2011 to automaker Mercedes-Benz, renaming the facility Mercedes-Benz Superdome. Mercedes-Benz did not renew the contract, and in July 2021 it was announced that the naming rights would be sold to Caesars Entertainment, under which it was renamed Caesars Superdome.

==== Statue ====
On July 27, 2012, a statue was unveiled at a plaza next to the Superdome. The work, titled Rebirth, depicts one of the most famous plays in Saints history—Steve Gleason's block of a Michael Koenen punt that the Saints recovered for a touchdown early in the first quarter of the team's first post-Katrina game in the Superdome.

==== Super Bowl XLVII power failure ====
The Superdome hosted the Super Bowl XLVII football game on February 3, 2013. A partial power failure halted game play for about 34 minutes in the third quarter between the Baltimore Ravens and the San Francisco 49ers. It caused CBS, who was broadcasting the game, to lose some of its cameras as well as voiceovers by commentators Jim Nantz and Phil Simms. At no point did the game go off the air, though the game had no audio for about two minutes. While the lights were coming back on, sideline reporter Steve Tasker reported on the outage as a breaking news situation until power was restored enough for play to continue.

On February 8, 2013, it was reported that a relay device intended to prevent an electrical overload had caused the failure. The device was located in an electrical vault owned and operated by Entergy, the electrical utility for the New Orleans area. That vault is approximately one-quarter mile (0.40 km) away from the Superdome. A subsequent report from an independent auditor confirmed the relay device as the cause. The Superdome's own power system was never compromised.

==== End zone scoreboards and new lighting ====
During the 2016 off-season, the smaller videoboards formerly located along the end zone walls above the upper seating bowl were replaced with two large Panasonic HD LED displays that stretch 330 feet (100 m) wide and 35 feet (11 m) tall that are much easier to see throughout the bowl. Other upgrades included a complete upgrade to the Superdome's interior floodlighting system to an efficient LED system with programmable coloring, light show effects, and instant on-off; in normal mode the stadium will have a more vibrant and naturally pleasing system resembling natural daylight.

==== Current renovations ====
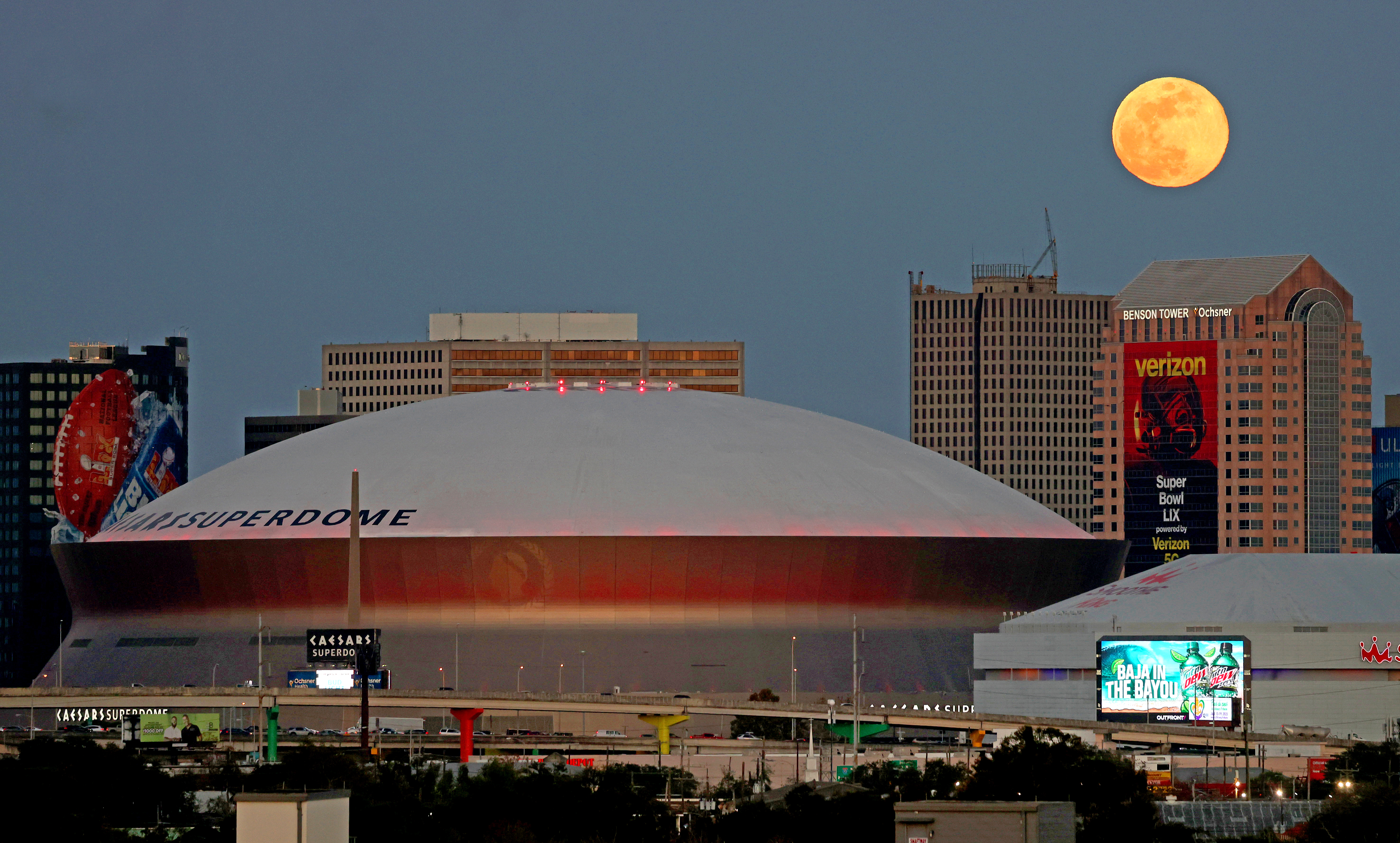
The full moon rises over the Superdome and the city of New Orleans, Louisiana on January 13, 2025.

In November 2019, phase one plans were approved by the Louisiana Stadium and Exposition District, commonly known as the Superdome Commission, for a $450 million renovation. The renovation, designed by Trahan Architects (founded by Victor F. "Trey" Trahan III, FAIA), included atriums that replaced the ramp system, improved concourses, and field-level end zone boxes. The first phase of work began January 2020 and included installing alternative exits and constructing a large kitchen and food-service area. The renovations were completed over multiple phases in time for the stadium to host Super Bowl LIX in early 2025.

==== 2021 roof fire ====
On September 21, 2021, thick black smoke was seen rising from the top of the Superdome while renovations and maintenance were underway by workers on the roof. One person was injured in the blaze that initially started when a pressure washer caught fire. Firefighters brought the fire under control within an hour. No structural damage occurred to the building, and future events were not impacted.

== Features ==
The Superdome is located on 70 acres (28 ha) of land, near the former Girod Street Cemetery. The dome has an interior space of 125 million cubic feet (3,500,000 m^{3}), a height of 253 feet (77.1 m), a dome diameter of 680 feet (207.3 m), and a total floor area of 269,000 square feet (24,991 m^{2}).

=== Capacity ===
The Superdome has a listed football seating capacity of 76,468 (expanded) or 73,208 (not expanded) and a maximum basketball seating capacity of 73,432. However, published attendance figures from events such as the Super Bowl football game have exceeded 79,000. The basketball capacity does not reflect the NCAA's new policy on arranging the basketball court on the 50-yard line on the football field, per 2009 NCAA policy. In 2011, 3,500 seats were added, increasing the Superdome's capacity to 76,468. The Superdome's capacity was 78,133 for WrestleMania 34. In 2021, 4,300 seats were removed, with the goal of improving the fan experience by widening concourses, adding quick-service concessions, and building larger elevators and escalators.

The chronology of the capacity for football is as follows:

| Years | Capacity | Notes |
|---|---|---|
| 1975–1978 | 74,452 | |
| 1979–1984 | 71,330 | |
| 1985–1986 | 71,647 | |
| 1987–1990 | 69,723 | |
| 1991–1994 | 69,065 | |
| 1995 | 70,852 | |
| 1996 | 64,992 | |
| 1997 | 69,420 | |
| 1998 | 69,028 | |
| 1999 | 70,054 | |
| 2000 | 64,900 | |
| 2001 | 70,020 | |
| 2002–2003 | 68,500 | |
| 2004–2005 | 64,900 | |
| 2006 | 68,354 | |
| 2007–2010 | 72,968 | |
| 2011–present | 73,208 | ^ |

^ expandable to 76,468

== Notable events ==
=== Football ===
Desmond Howard's 99-yard kick return touchdown in the Superdome in Super Bowl XXXI
- Green Bay Packers return specialist Desmond Howard returns Adam Vinatieri's kickoff 99 yards for a touchdown in Super Bowl XXXI, January 26, 1997

The Superdome's primary tenant is the NFL's New Orleans Saints. The team regularly draws capacity crowds.

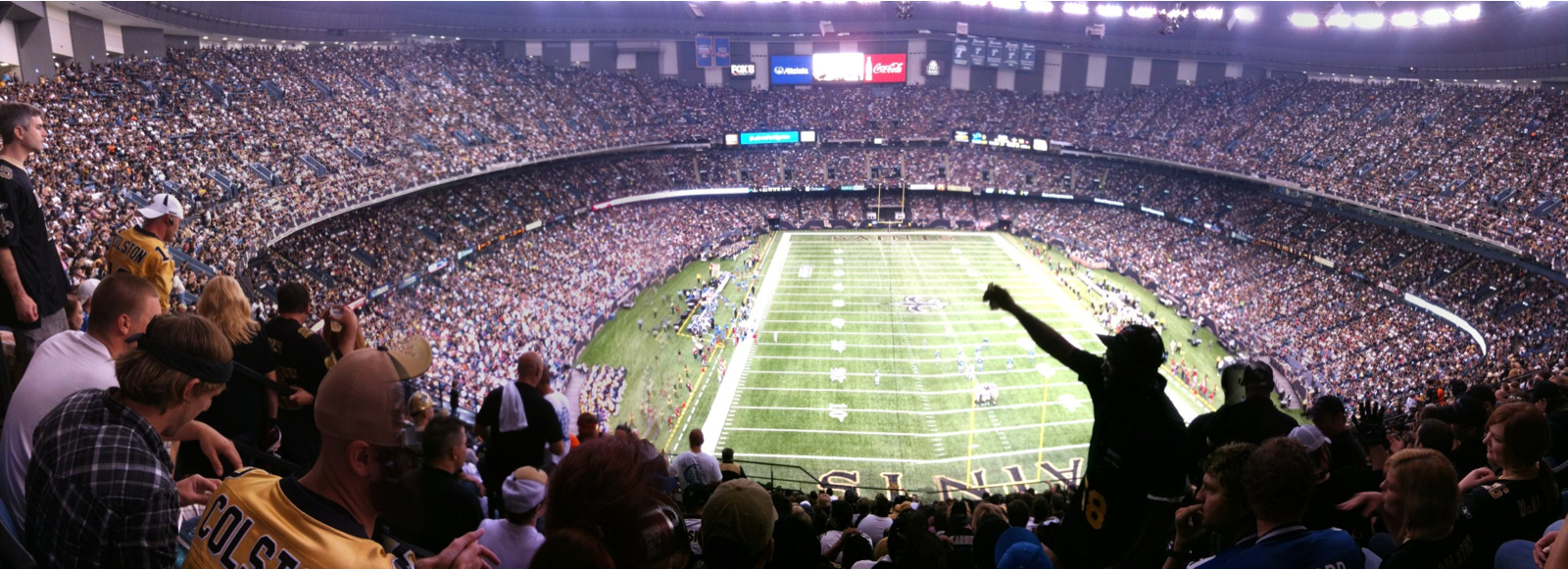
Panorama of 69,719 in attendance during a Saints game vs the Detroit Lions, 2009

The NFL has hosted eight Super Bowls at the Superdome, most recently Super Bowl LIX in 2025.

The 1976 Pro Bowl was held at the Superdome on Monday, January 26, 1976. It was the NFL's 26th annual all-star game.

The Bowl Championship Series National Championship Games were played at the Superdome four times. The College Football Playoff semifinal game is played every three years in the stadium. The CFP national championship game was played at the stadium once (and will return in 2028). Two other bowl games are also played there annually: the Sugar Bowl and New Orleans Bowl. The stadium also now hosts the Louisiana Kickoff. Florida State was victorious 24–23 over LSU in the first matchup of the inaugural kickoff.

The Superdome also hosts the Bayou Classic, an annual rivalry classic between the state's two largest historically black colleges and universities, Grambling State and Southern. Tulane University played their home games at the stadium from 1975 to 2013 (except 2005) before moving to on-campus Yulman Stadium.

In 2013, the Arena Football League New Orleans VooDoo played their last six home games of the season at the stadium. From 1991 to 1992, the New Orleans Night of the AFL played at the stadium.

On January 20, 2019, the Superdome was the site of the 2018 NFC Championship Game between the Los Angeles Rams and New Orleans Saints, which had one of the most controversial no-calls in NFL history, where a clear pass interference call on Rams corner Nickell Robey-Coleman to Saints receiver Tommylee Lewis went uncalled. The Saints would end up losing in overtime. The uncalled pass interference play resulted in a public apology from NFL commissioner Roger Goodell, fines to Robey-Coleman for the hit, lawsuits against the NFL, and rule changes regarding replay which made pass interference reviewable by replay.

The annual Louisiana Prep Classic state championship football games organized by the Louisiana High School Athletic Association have been held at the Superdome since 1981, except in 2005 following the extreme damage of Hurricane Katrina (moved to Independence Stadium in Shreveport) and 2020 due to the COVID-19 pandemic (moved to Harry Turpin Stadium in Natchitoches, Louisiana). The first state championship game in the stadium matched New Orleans Catholic League powers St. Augustine and Jesuit on December 15, 1978. The Purple Knights won their second Class AAAA title in four seasons by ousting the Blue Jays, 13–7, in front of over 42,000 fans.

| Date | Super Bowl | Team (Visitor) | Points | Team (Home) | Points | Spectators |
|---|---|---|---|---|---|---|
| January 15, 1978 | XII | Dallas Cowboys | 27 | Denver Broncos | 10 | 76,400 |
| January 25, 1981 | XV | Oakland Raiders | 27 | Philadelphia Eagles | 10 | 76,135 |
| January 26, 1986 | XX | Chicago Bears | 46 | New England Patriots | 10 | 73,818 |
| January 28, 1990 | XXIV | San Francisco 49ers | 55 | Denver Broncos | 10 | 72,919 |
| January 26, 1997 | XXXI | New England Patriots | 21 | Green Bay Packers | 35 | 72,301 |
| February 3, 2002 | XXXVI | St. Louis Rams | 17 | New England Patriots | 20 | 72,922 |
| February 3, 2013 | XLVII | Baltimore Ravens | 34 | San Francisco 49ers | 31 | 71,024 |
| February 9, 2025 | LIX | Kansas City Chiefs | 22 | Philadelphia Eagles | 40 | 65,719 |

==== Home field advantage ====
Since the Superdome's reopening in the wake of Hurricane Katrina and the increased success of the New Orleans Saints, the Superdome has developed a reputation for having a very strong home field advantage. While all domed stadiums possess this quality to some degree, the Superdome is known to be extremely loud during games, especially during offensive drives by the visiting team.

During a pregame interview before the Minnesota Vikings' opening game of the 2010 NFL season against the Saints, Brett Favre, reflecting on the Vikings' loss to the Saints in the 2009 NFC Championship Game, said of the Superdome: "That was, by far, the most hostile environment I've ever been in. You couldn't hear anything." It was during that loss that some of the Vikings players elected to wear earplugs, including Favre. It was the first game of the season that they had chosen to do so.

=== Baseball ===
When the plaza level seats remained moveable, the capacity for baseball was 63,525 and the field size was as follows: 325 feet (99 m) to both left field and right field, 365 feet (111 m) to both left-center field and right-center field, 421 feet (128 m) to center field, and 60 feet (18 m) to the backstop. The bowl was reconfigured in a renovation from 2006 to 2011, which replaced the moveable seats with a pre-cast concrete deck and moved the seating closer to the field, creating 3,500 new seats in the lower bowl. This made the bowl more suitable for football, but less accommodating for baseball.

The first baseball game in the Superdome was an exhibition between the Minnesota Twins and the Houston Astros on April 6, 1976.

Superdome officials pursued negotiations with Oakland Athletics officials during the 1978–79 baseball off-season about moving the Athletics to the Superdome. The Athletics were unable to break their lease at the Oakland–Alameda County Coliseum and remained in Oakland. Superdome officials met with the Pittsburgh Pirates in April 1981 about moving the club to New Orleans when the Pirates were unhappy with their lease at Three Rivers Stadium.

In the mid-1990s, the Superdome was planned to be the home of the yet-to-be named New Orleans team, a charter franchise of the United League (UL) which was a planned third league of Major League Baseball (MLB) that never came to fruition.

==== Minor League Baseball ====
The American Association New Orleans Pelicans played at the Superdome during the 1977 season. The Pelicans' season attendance was 217,957 at the dome.

==== Major League Baseball exhibitions ====
The Minnesota Twins and the Houston Astros played an exhibition game on April 6, 1976. The New York Yankees played exhibition games at the Superdome in 1980, 1981, 1982, and 1983. The Yankees hosted the Baltimore Orioles on March 15 and 16, 1980. 45,152 spectators watched the Yankees beat the Orioles 9–3 on March 15, 1980. The following day, 43,339 fans saw Floyd Rayford lead the Orioles to a 7–1 win over the Yankees. In 1981, the Yankees played the New York Mets, Philadelphia Philles and Pittsburgh Pirates in the dome. In 1982, the Yankees played the Montreal Expos and Texas Rangers and late in 1982, the Yankees considered opening the 1983 regular season at the Superdome if Yankee Stadium would not be ready yet after renovations. The 1983 New York Yankees also played the Montreal Expos and Toronto Blue Jays in the Superdome that year. The Philadelphia Phillies and St. Louis Cardinals closed the 1984 spring training season with two games at the dome on March 31, 1984, and April 1, 1984. In what was a preview of the 1989 World Series, the Oakland A's played the San Francisco Giants in two games on March 28–29, 1989. In 1991, the Los Angeles Dodgers played the Oakland A's in two games on March 22–23, 1991. The A's also played the New York Mets in two contests on March 26–27, 1993. In 1994, the Boston Red Sox played the New York Yankees in two games on April 1–2, 1994. The last professional baseball games played in the Superdome occurred on April 3–4, 1999, when the Chicago Cubs and Minnesota Twins played a two-game series dubbed the "New Orleans Major League Baseball Classic."

==== Busch Challenge/Winn-Dixie Showdown ====
The Busch Challenge/Winn-Dixie Showdown was a college baseball tournament held in the Superdome from 1987 to 1999. LSU, Tulane and University of New Orleans played an in-state team and out-of-state teams from Alabama, Arkansas, California, Florida, Georgia, Mississippi, North Carolina, Oklahoma and Texas in the annual tournament. The in-state team was Louisiana-Lafayette. The out-of-state teams were Alabama, Arkansas, Auburn, Cal State Fullerton, Duke, Florida, Florida State, Georgia, Georgia Southern, Georgia Tech, Houston, Lamar, Miami (FL), Mississippi State, NC State, North Carolina, Oklahoma, Oklahoma State, Ole Miss, Oral Roberts, South Alabama, Southern California, Southern Mississippi, Texas A&M, UCLA.

==== Savannah Bananas World Tour ====
For the first time in several years, the Superdome welcomed baseball back into the stadium for two consecutive nights, hosting the Savannah Bananas 2026 Banana Ball World Tour. Both games hosted sold-out crowds each night, for a Superdome attendance record for events on consecutive nights.

=== Basketball ===
The NCAA has hosted the Men's Final Four at the Superdome six times in 1982, 1987, 1993, 2003, 2012, and 2022. The 1982 final between the University of North Carolina and Georgetown University featured 15 lead changes before a young Michael Jordan hit the game-winning shot to give North Carolina the lead for good. The game is considered by many to be one of the greatest college basketball games ever played, while also introducing Jordan to a national audience. The stadium hosted regional semifinals and finals in 1981 and 1990, as well as first- and second-round games in 1999 and 2001. The 2012 and 2022 editions were hosted with a full-stadium setup with center court resting where midfield at the 50-yard line is, with previous Final Fours having varied setups with some sections blocked off and obstructive temporary seating.

The Superdome has also hosted the SEC men's basketball tournament in 1996 and 2003.

The NBA's New Orleans Jazz used the Superdome as their home court, from 1975 to 1979. In 1977, the Jazz set what was then an NBA attendance record for an NBA game, with 35,077 watching the Jazz, led by Pete "Pistol Pete" Maravich, face the Philadelphia 76ers, led by fellow future Hall of Famer Julius Erving. The 2017 NBA All-Star Celebrity Game, a part of that year's All-Star Weekend, was hosted in the Superdome with half the venue curtained off.

Tulane used the Superdome as its primary home court from its opening in 1975 through 1982. It played occasional games there in the 1990s against high-profile opponents before the opening of the New Orleans Arena (now the Smoothie King Center) in 1999.

In 1996, the stadium hosted the AAU Junior Olympics basketball competition.

=== Boxing ===
On October 14, 1975, the Dome hosted Muhammad Ali Appreciation Day. The Muhammad Temple of Islam 46 in New Orleans organized the activities, with Ali's appearance as the day's highlight. Speakers included Dr. Na'im Akbar, Wallace D. Muhammad and Louis Farrakhan.

The Superdome hosted the September 15, 1978 fight some called the Ali rematch where Muhammad Ali won the world Heavyweight title for the third time by beating Leon Spinks in front of a crowd of 65,000. It was Ali's last professional win.

Leonard–Durán II, also known as the No Más Fight, took place on November 25, 1980, at the Louisiana Superdome. In the match, Sugar Ray Leonard defeated Roberto Durán to regain the WBC Welterweight Championship. The match gained its famous appellation in the end of the eighth round when Durán turned away from Leonard, towards the referee and quit by saying "No más" (Spanish for "No more").

On December 3, 1982, the Superdome hosted the Carnival of Champions. In the first of two co-main events, Wilfredo Gómez of Puerto Rico would defend his WBC world Jr Featherweight championship against WBC's world Bantamweight champion Lupe Pintor of Mexico. In the second, Wilfred Benítez defended his WBC world Jr Middleweight championship against the former WBA Welterweight champion of the world Thomas Hearns. Gomez beat Pintor by fourteenth-round technical knockout in a fight that has been considered among the greatest of all times between Mexicans and Puerto Ricans and the greatest fight at the Super Bantamweight division while Hearns beat Benitez by fifteen-rounds majority decision.

=== Gymnastics ===
The USSR National Gymnastics Team performed for the first time in Louisiana in 1976. The Superdome event featured Olga Korbut, Nelli Kim, Nicolai Andrianov and Alexander Dityatin.

At the 1995 U.S. Gymnastics National Championships, Dominique Moceanu became the youngest Women's All-Around National Champion in U.S. history at 13 years old, a record that still stands. John Roethlisberger also won his fourth and final U.S. Men's All-Around National Championship.

In 1996, the stadium hosted the AAU Junior Olympics gymnastics competition.

=== Motocross ===
The Superdome hosted an AMA Supercross Championship round from 1977 to 1980, 1998 to 2002, 2009 and 2012. On June 4, 1977, 40,000 fans watched Jimmy Weinert win the sixth of 12 races for a $250,000 purse. 20 million pounds (9,100,000 kg) of dirt were piled into the center of the Superdome for the event.

=== Rugby union ===
The Superdome was scheduled to host a rugby union match on August 1, 2015, between English Premiership team Saracens and New Zealand's Super Rugby team Crusaders. The match was organized by RugbyLaw, organizers of the National Rugby Football League. The match was cancelled, however, as USA Rugby, the governing body of the sport in the United States, refused to approve the artificial turf playing surface.

=== Soccer ===
The Superdome's first soccer matches occurred on September 5, 1976. In a doubleheader, two local club teams (Costa Rica and Olympia) squared off, followed by a post-season North American Soccer League matchup between the New York Cosmos and the Dallas Tornado. Pelé and Kyle Rote, Jr. led their respective teams, but it was Werner Roth and Ramon Mifflin who notched goals for New York in the Cosmos' 2–1 victory.

The U.S. women's national team met China in the Superdome on December 16, 2015, in what was both the final match of the USWNT's post-World Cup Victory Tour, as well as Abby Wambach's last game for the national team. China won, 1–0, in front of 32,950 fans: a record-setting attendance for a soccer match in Louisiana. On October 19, 2017, the USWNT played an international friendly against the Korea Republic, defeating them 3–1. Alex Morgan scored in the 40th minute for the United States, tallying her 78th career goal.

==== International soccer matches ====
| Date | Winning Team | Result | Losing Team | Tournament | Spectators |
|---|---|---|---|---|---|
| December 16, 2015 | China | 1–0 | United States | Women's U.S. Final Victory Tour | 32,950 |
| October 17, 2017 | United States | 3–1 | South Korea | Women's International Friendly | 9,371 |

=== Professional wrestling ===
The Superdome was renowned for hosting many of Mid-South Wrestling's large, "Blow Off" events that were culminations of weeks or months of feuds and rivalries. Bill Watts was the promoter of this territory and gained much notoriety from promotion of his events in the Superdome.

April 19, 1986, saw Jim Crockett Promotions (in association with Bill Watts' UWF and All Japan Pro Wrestling) host the first of three annual Jim Crockett Sr. Memorial Cup Tag Team Tournaments. 24 teams competed in a single day show with an afternoon 1st rounds and finals in the evening. The tournament final saw The Road Warriors prevail over Magnum T. A. and Ron Garvin. Besides tag team tournament the Superdome attendance of 13,000 saw NWA World Champion Ric Flair retain the title via disqualification from Dusty Rhodes and Mid-South North American Champion Hacksaw Jim Duggan beat Buzz Sawyer.

WCW held its sixth Clash of the Champions on April 2, 1989. The event saw Ricky Steamboat defeat Ric Flair in a two out of three falls match 2–1 to retain the NWA World Heavyweight Championship, arguably one of the greatest matches of all time. Clash VI was held on the same day as WrestleMania V and on free TV in an attempt to hurt the PPV rating. On January 13, 1997, WCW Monday Nitro was also broadcast from the Superdome.

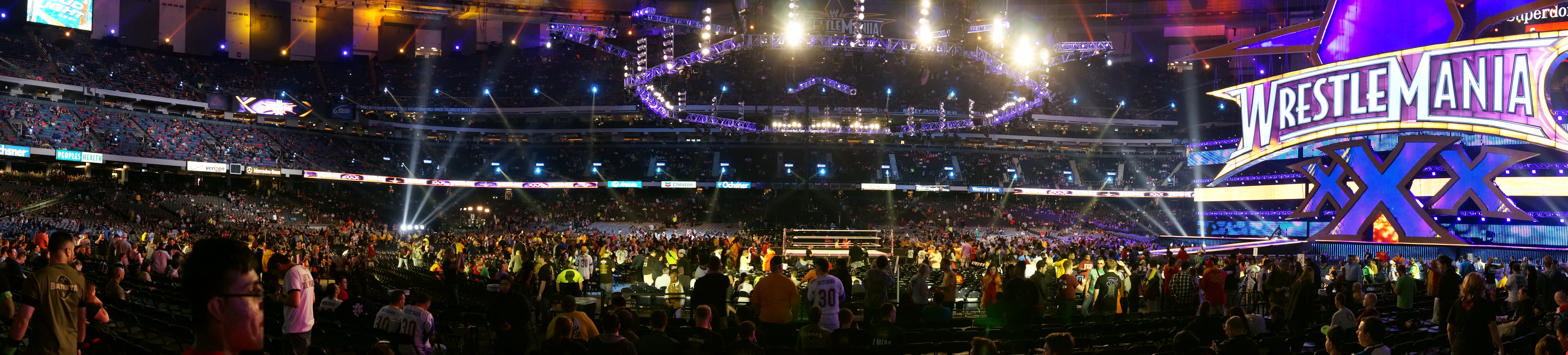
A panoramic shot of WWE's WrestleMania XXX (pre-show) within the Superdome

WWE's flagship pay-per-view and livestreaming event, WrestleMania, has been hosted at the Superdome twice, with a third time scheduled. It first hosted WrestleMania XXX on April 6, 2014, an event which notably featured Brock Lesnar ending The Undertaker's long-standing WrestleMania winning streak and Daniel Bryan defeating Randy Orton and Batista to win the WWE World Heavyweight Championship in the main event. WrestleMania returned to the Superdome in 2018 for WrestleMania 34 with Brock Lesnar defeating Roman Reigns in the main event to retain the WWE Universal Championship. It was also notable for Ronda Rousey's professional wrestling debut match where she teamed with Kurt Angle to defeat Triple H and Stephanie McMahon in a mixed tag team match. The Superdome planned to host the event once again in 2026 for WrestleMania 42, marking its third time as the venue for WWE's premier marquee event, this time as a two-night event on April 11 and 12, 2026. However, on May 22, it was announced that the stadium would not host WrestleMania 42 and would instead host a future WrestleMania.

=== Tennis ===
The New Orleans Sun Belt Nets were a charter franchise of World TeamTennis (WTT). The Nets played in the Superdome during the 1978 season.

=== Olympic wrestling ===
In 1996, the stadium hosted the AAU Junior Olympics wrestling competition. In February 1997, the Dome hosted the Louisiana High School Athletic Association state wrestling championships.

=== Concerts ===
Between August 28 and September 14, 1975, the Superdome continued to celebrate its grand opening, with appearances by Bob Hope, Chayl Jhuren, Telly Savalas, Dorothy Lamour, Karen Valentine, and Raquel Welch. The Allman Brothers, the Marshall Tucker Band, Wet Willie, the Charlie Daniels band, the O'Jays, the Isley Brothers, the Temptations, Donald Byrd and the Blackbyrds, and the Ringling Brothers and Barnum & Bailey Circus also performed.

On October 3, 1975, June Carter, Johnny Cash, Merle Haggard, Waylon Jennings and Jessi Colter performed in the Dome. Fans included then Governor Edwin Edwards, wife Elaine, children Anna, Victoria, Steven and David, and Edwards' grandchildren.

The Superdome's 1977 New Year's Eve celebration opened with the Emotions and Deniece Williams, followed by Earth, Wind and Fire.

On May 29, 1977, the First Annual Superdome KOOL Jazz Spectacular featured Aretha Franklin, Al Green, the Spinners and the Mighty Clouds of Joy. Jimmie "J.J." Walker from the TV series Good Times was the guest M.C.

Since 1981, the Krewe of Endymion has hosted its Mardi Gras ball and concert, the Endymion Extravaganza, at the Superdome. It traditionally serves as the culmination of the krewe's parade.

The Superdome hosted Jimmy Buffett in 1976, Willie Nelson in 1977, the Commodores and Fats Domino in 1978, Kenny Rogers in 1979, Hank Williams Jr. 1981, and Lil Wayne in 2018.

Governor Edwin Edwards held his third inaugural ball at the Superdome on March 12, 1984. Headline acts included Doug Kershaw and Susan Anton.

Because of a booking mixup, the Jets performed a full set to an empty Superdome in the summer of 1987.

The annual Essence Music Festival has been held in the Superdome every year since 1995 (with the exception of 2006, when it was held in Houston, Texas due to Hurricane Katrina repairs, and 2020 when it was cancelled due to the COVID-19 pandemic).

| Date | Artist | Opening act(s) | Tour / Concert name | Attendance | Revenue | Notes |
|---|---|---|---|---|---|---|
| July 13, 1978 | The Rolling Stones | Van Halen; Doobie Brothers | US Tour 1978 | 80,173 | $1,060,000 | |
| December 5, 1981 | The Rolling Stones | George Thorogood; The Neville Brothers | American Tour 1981 | | $1,531,250 | Attendees filled the floor area, as well as the regular seating sections. |
| February 14, 1983 | Kiss | Zebra | Creatures of the Night Tour/10th Anniversary Tour | 10,421 / 15,000 | $107,866 | Mardi Gras Eve Spectacular |
| February 1, 1985 | Prince | Apollonia 6 Sheila E. | Purple Rain Tour | — | — | |
| October 6, 1987 | David Bowie | — | Glass Spider Tour | — | — | |
| November 27, 1987 | Whitney Houston | Kenny G | Moment of Truth World Tour | — | — | |
| October 18, 1988 | George Michael | — | Faith World Tour | | $450,555 | |
| November 13, 1989 | The Rolling Stones | Living Colour | Steel Wheels Tour | 59,339 / 59,339 | $1,682,220 | |
| July 8, 1990 | Janet Jackson | Chuckii Booker | Rhythm Nation World Tour 1990 | — | — | |
| August 23, 1990 | New Kids on the Block | — | The Magic Summer Tour | — | — | |
| August 29, 1992 | Guns N' Roses; Metallica | Faith No More | Guns N' Roses/Metallica Stadium Tour | 39,278 / 39,278 | $1,080,145 | |
| April 24, 1993 | Paul McCartney | — | The New World Tour | 38,971 / 41,211 | $843,850 | |
| May 14, 1994 | Pink Floyd | — | The Division Bell Tour | 41,475 / 41,475 | $1,401,445 | |
| August 1, 1994 | Janet Jackson | - | Janet World Tour | — | — | |
| October 10, 1994 | The Rolling Stones | Bryan Adams | Voodoo Lounge Tour | 32,687 / 40,000 | $1,464,250 | |
| July 9, 1996 | Kiss | The Melvins | Alive/Worldwide Tour | 16,308 / 16,308 | $513,665 | |
| November 21, 1997 | U2 | Third Eye Blind | PopMart Tour | 21,465 / 25,000 | $911,528 | |
| October 28, 1998 | Janet Jackson | — | The Velvet Rope Tour | — | — | |
| April 12, 1999 | Celine Dion | — | Let's Talk About Love World Tour | 20,047 / 20,047 | $1,153,562 | |
| June 23, 1999 | Cher | Cyndi Lauper; Wild Orchid | Do You Believe? | 12,754 / 16,000 | $712,529 | |
| February 26, 2000 | Backstreet Boys | Jungle Brothers; Willa | Into the Millennium Tour | 54,365 / 56,211 | $2,286,582 | |
| May 27, 2000 | NSYNC | P!nk; Sisqó | No Strings Attached Tour | 32,516 / 32,516 | $1,456,245 | |
| September 20, 2000 | Britney Spears | BBMak | Oops!... I Did It Again Tour | — | — | This concert was taped for a Fox TV special titled There's No Place Like Home. |
| August 22, 2001 | NSYNC | Amanda | PopOdyssey Tour | — | — | This show was filmed and released on VHS and DVD. |
| August 25, 2004 | Usher | Kanye West; Christina Milian | Truth Tour | — | — | |
| July 2, 2005 | Destiny's Child | — | Destiny Fulfilled... and Lovin' It | — | — | This concert was part of the Essence Music Festival |
| July 6, 2007 | Beyoncé | — | The Beyoncé Experience | — | — | This concert was part of the Essence Music Festival. |
| July 7, 2007 | Kelly Rowland | — | — | — | — | This concert was part of the Essence Music Festival. |
| July 4, 2008 | Rihanna | — | Good Girl Gone Bad Tour | — | — | This show was part of the 2008 Essence Music Festival. |
| July 3, 2009 | Beyoncé | — | I Am... Tour | — | — | This show was part of the 2009 Essence Music Festival. |
| July 3, 2010 | Alicia Keys | Robin Thicke; Melanie Fiona | Freedom Tour | — | — | This concert was part of the Essence Music Festival |
| August 3, 2012 | Kenny Chesney; Tim McGraw | Grace Potter and the Nocturnals; Jake Owen | Brothers of the Sun Tour | 37,916 / 40,876 | $3,385,855 | |
| July 7, 2013 | Beyoncé | — | The Mrs. Carter Show World Tour | 38,441 / 38,441 | $5,766,150 | This concert was a part of the Essence Music Festival. |
| July 20, 2014 | Beyoncé; Jay-Z | — | On the Run Tour | 42,374 / 42,374 | $5,206,490 | |
| September 25, 2014 | One Direction | 5 Seconds of Summer | Where We Are Tour | 50,349 / 50,349 | $4,258,450 | |
| July 2, 2015 | Kevin Hart | — | What Now? Tour | — | — | |
| July 31, 2016 | Guns N' Roses | The Cult | Not In This Lifetime... Tour | 32,894 / 40,215 | $3,447,362 | |
| September 24, 2016 | Beyoncé | DJ Khaled | The Formation World Tour | 46,474 / 46,474 | $5,349,960 | Beyoncé was introduced to the stage by New Orleans native and "Formation" rapper Big Freedia. |
| May 27, 2017 | Miranda Lambert | — | Highway Vagabond Tour | — | — | This concert was part of Bayou Country Superfest. |
| September 14, 2017 | U2 | Beck | The Joshua Tree Tour 2017 | 34,536 / 34,536 | $3,873,405 | |
| September 13, 2018 | Beyoncé; Jay-Z | Chloe X Halle and DJ Khaled | On the Run II Tour | 40,939 / 40,939 | $5,437,147 | |
| September 22, 2018 | Taylor Swift | Camila Cabello; Charli XCX | Taylor Swift's Reputation Stadium Tour | 53,172 / 53,172 | $6,491,546 | |
| October 31, 2018 | Ed Sheeran | Snow Patrol; Lauv | ÷ Tour | 42,295 / 42,295 | $2,827,815 | |
| July 15, 2019 | The Rolling Stones | Ivan Neville's Dumpstaphunk; The Soul Rebels | No Filter Tour | 35,023 / 35,023 | $7,163,692 | This concert was originally scheduled to take place on July 14, 2019, but was postponed due to Hurricane Barry. The highest-grossing concert at the stadium to date. |
| September 27, 2023 | Beyoncé | — | Renaissance World Tour | 49,265 / 49,265 | $10,802,708 | |
| October 25, 2024 | Taylor Swift | Gracie Abrams | The Eras Tour | TBA | TBA | Swift is the first act to perform two or three shows at the stadium on a single tour. |
| October 26, 2024 | Taylor Swift | Gracie Abrams | The Eras Tour | TBA | TBA | Swift is the first act to perform two or three shows at the stadium on a single tour. |
| October 27, 2024 | Taylor Swift | Gracie Abrams | The Eras Tour | TBA | TBA | Swift is the first act to perform two or three shows at the stadium on a single tour. |
| October 16, 2025 | Chris Brown | Jhené Aiko; Bryson Tiller | Breezy Bowl XX | | | |
| August 28, 2026 | Kanye West | | Ye Live Concert Tour | | | |
| September 16, 2026 | Bruno Mars | DJ Pee .Wee; Raye | The Romantic Tour | | | |
| November 20, 2026 | Usher; Chris Brown | | The R&B Tour | | | |

=== Other events ===
- The Seventh-day Adventist Church held its 54th General Conference session at the Superdome in June and July 1985.
- Pope John Paul II addressed 80,000 children at the stadium in 1987.
- The Republican National Convention was held there in 1988, nominating then-Vice President George H. W. Bush for president and U.S. Senator Dan Quayle of Indiana as vice president.
- In June 1996, The Hunchback of Notre Dame, Disney's 34th animated feature, had a gala world premiere at this stadium, with over 65,000 people attending the event.
- From February 14 to 25, 2000, Wheel of Fortune aired two weeks' worth of shows that were taped in the dome in January 2000.
- In August 2001, the Bassmaster Classic XXXI final weigh-in was held in the stadium.
- In 2005, the superdome was used as an emergency shelter during Hurricane Katrina.
- In 2020, the Finish Line of CBS's reality competition The Amazing Race 32 was held at the Superdome.

== See also ==
- Champions Square
- History of the New Orleans Saints
- Sports in New Orleans
- Smoothie King Center
- National Register of Historic Places listings in Orleans Parish, Louisiana
- List of tallest domes
- Lists of stadiums
- List of music venues
- List of convention centers in the United States
- List of soccer stadiums in the United States

== Notes ==
Events and tenants
| Preceded by Tulane Stadium; Giants Stadium, Tiger Stadium, and the Alamodome | Home of the New Orleans Saints; 1975–2004; 2006–present | Succeeded by Giants Stadium, Tiger Stadium, and the Alamodome current |
| Preceded by Tulane Stadium; No permanent home in 2005 | Home of the Tulane Green Wave; 1975–2004; 2006–2013 | Succeeded by No permanent home in 2005; Yulman Stadium |
| Preceded by Tulane Stadium; Georgia Dome | Home of the Sugar Bowl; 1975–2005; 2007–present | Succeeded by Georgia Dome incumbent |
| Preceded by Levi's Stadium | Home of the College Football Playoff National Championship; 2020 | Succeeded by Hard Rock Stadium |
| Preceded by first arena | Home of the New Orleans Night; 1991–1992 | Succeeded by last arena |
| Preceded by Municipal Auditorium & Loyola Field House | Home of the New Orleans Jazz; 1975–1979 | Succeeded by Salt Palace (as Utah Jazz) |
| Preceded by Miami Orange Bowl | Host of the NFL Pro Bowl; 1976 | Succeeded by The Kingdome |
| Preceded by Rose Bowl; Rose Bowl; Stanford Stadium; Joe Robbie Stadium; Sun Devil Stadium; Raymond James Stadium; Lucas Oil Stadium; Allegiant Stadium | Host of the Super Bowl; XII 1978; XV 1981; XX 1986; XXIV 1990; XXXI 1997; XXXVI 2002; XLVII 2013; LIX 2025 | Succeeded by Orange Bowl; Pontiac Silverdome; Rose Bowl; Tampa Stadium; Qualcomm Stadium; Qualcomm Stadium; MetLife Stadium; Levi's Stadium |
| Preceded by The Spectrum; Reunion Arena; H.H.H. Metrodome; Georgia Dome; Reliant Stadium; Lucas Oil Stadium | Host of the NCAA Division I men's basketball tournament finals 1982; 1987; 1993; 2003; 2012; 2022 | Succeeded by The Pit; Kemper Arena; Charlotte Coliseum; Alamodome; Georgia Dome; NRG Stadium |
| Preceded by Sun Devil Stadium; Sun Devil Stadium; University of Phoenix Stadium; University of Phoenix Stadium | Host of the BCS National Championship Game; 2000; 2004; 2008; 2012 | Succeeded by Pro Player Stadium; Pro Player Stadium; Dolphin Stadium; Sun Life Stadium |
| Preceded by University of Phoenix Stadium; Lincoln Financial Field | Host of NFC Championship Game; 2010; 2019 | Succeeded by Soldier Field; Levi's Stadium |
| Preceded by MetLife Stadium; Camping World Stadium | Host of WrestleMania; 2014 (XXX); 2018 (34) | Succeeded by Levi's Stadium; MetLife Stadium |
