= PRO Rugby =

Professional rugby union league in the U.S.

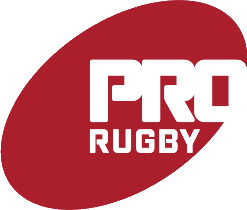
- Sport: Rugby union
- Founded: 2015
- First season: 2016
- Folded: 2017
- CEO: Douglas Schoninger
- No. of teams: 5
- Country: United States
- Last champion: Denver Stampede (2016)
- Broadcasters: ONE World Sports; Time Warner Cable Sports Channel
- Website: PRORugby.org

The Professional Rugby Organization, known as PRO Rugby, was an American professional rugby union competition. PRO began play in April 2016 with five teams and ceased operations by January 2017. The competition was sanctioned by USA Rugby and by World Rugby. This was the first professional rugby competition in North America.

== History ==
=== Previous attempts ===
For several years prior to PRO Rugby's launch in 2016, a number of entities had explored a professional competition for fifteen-a-side rugby. The Rugby Super League, a national competition that began play in 1997, was discussed as potentially becoming a professional competition,, but the RSL struggled financially, with several teams exiting the competition from 2009 to 2012 before the league folded after the 2012 season.

In 2012, the American Professional Rugby Competition was reported to be exploring a launch of a ten-team league for 2015, but nothing came of it.

The National Rugby Football League also announced its intention to begin a professional rugby competition and scheduled the Independence Cup, but the venture never got off the ground.

=== PRO Rugby launch ===
In early November 2015, PRO Rugby launched its Facebook page and scheduled an announcement for November 9, 2015. On November 9, 2015, PRO Rugby made an official announcement outlining its plans and a framework for the competition. USA Rugby affirmed that it sanctioned and supported the PRO Rugby competition. PRO Rugby announced its first team, Sacramento, on November 18, 2015. PRO Rugby announced its second team, San Francisco, on November 19, 2015.

Though teams were scheduled to have coaches by the end of 2015, the uncertainty caused by the open position for head coach of the U.S. national rugby team led to PRO Rugby announcements being put on hold. As of mid-January 2016, with the U.S. head coach in place but no further developments from Pro Rugby, the league then offered the explanation that negotiating venues was what was holding up coach and player announcements but that three venues were close to agreement. On January 22, 2016, PRO Rugby announced San Diego as the league's third team, and media sources started speculating that the league may have only five teams in 2016 instead of the planned six teams. PRO Rugby announced on February 9, 2016 that the league's fourth team would be based in Columbus, Ohio. PRO Rugby officially announced on February 26, 2016 that Denver would be the competition's fifth team.

=== 2016 inaugural season ===
The league had planned to hold a player draft in early 2016, and the league reportedly had begun extending contract offers to select players by mid-February. In early March, the league made its first official announcement regarding player signings when it announced that Italian international Mirco Bergamasco would be joining the Sacramento team. Teams started convening their players in mid-March 2016 to begin training.

The competition began play on April 17, 2016. The first weekend of PRO Rugby saw Denver win at home against Ohio 16–13 before 2,300 fans despite a snowstorm, and Sacramento defeated San Francisco 37–25 before a crowd of 3,400 in Sacramento. The inaugural PRO Rugby Championship was decided in the last game of the season on July 31, 2016, with the Denver Stampede clinching the title by gaining a bonus point despite losing away to the Ohio Aviators 32–25.

=== 2016–17 off-season and folding ===
During the offseason, Director of Rugby Steve Lewis left PRO Rugby, with no replacement named. It was later reported that Lewis claimed PRO Rugby and Schoninger owed him unpaid salary and expenses; Lewis filed a claim in court, went to the New York state labor board, and also filed a grievance with USA Rugby.

The league had announced its intention to expand in 2017. Expansion was expected to include teams in the northeast United States. PRO Rugby stated that the 2017 competition format planned to include eight teams split into a west coast conference and a midwest/east conference. Expansion had been anticipated to include Canada in 2017, with PRO Rugby close to agreeing to place teams in Toronto and Vancouver. Rugby Canada announced on November 2, 2016, that an agreement with PRO for sanctioning in Canada for 2017 could not be reached, with the primary reason being their disagreement with an exclusivity clause that would have prevented Rugby Canada from sanctioning other professional rugby clubs in Canada in the future. In turn, PRO Rugby announced that it would no longer contract Canadian players.

The league folded the San Francisco Rush in December 2016. Schoninger blamed the folding on the lack of a suitable venue, and on lack of support from the local media. All PRO Rugby players then received notice on December 20, 2016, that their contracts would be terminated in 30 days if progress was not made towards resolving disputes between the league and USA Rugby. As of 2018, numerous players still report not to have been paid the salaries specified in their contracts with PRO Rugby. To recover some of their lost income, some players filed claims with their local labor commissioner offices. No other official announcements were made.

By the end of 2017, neither Schoninger or any representative for PRO Rugby had shown up in any of the court cases in regards to the expenses owed to former director Lewis and others from the operation on the lone Pro Rugby season.

== Competition format ==
Each team played 12 regular-season games over 16 weeks: six home matches and six away. Teams were awarded 4 points for a win, and 2 points for a draw. Teams were also awarded 1 point if they lost by 7 points or fewer, as well as for scoring 4 or more tries in a match. There was no post-season with the Championship decided on league table points.

The season ran from April to July with the teams having a lighter schedule during the June international test window, a time when teams lost players to the U.S. national team.

== Teams ==
Locations of teams for the 2016 PRO Rugby season.

The league began play in 2016 with five U.S. based teams.

The competition operated in a single-entity structure with all teams, at least initially, owned by the league, itself; individual investors own an interest in the competition but did not own individual teams.

=== Former teams ===
Club name	Metro area	Stadium	Capacity	Head Coach
Denver Stampede	Denver, Colorado	CIBER Field	1,915	(Ireland) Sean O'Leary
Ohio Aviators	Columbus, Ohio	Memorial Park	3,000	(England) Paule Barford
Sacramento Express	Sacramento, California	Bonney Field	11,442	(United States) Luke Gross
San Diego Breakers	San Diego, California	Torero Stadium	6,000	(Ireland) Ray Egan
San Francisco Rush	San Francisco, California	Boxer Stadium	3,500	(United States) Paul Keeler

== Players ==
Each team had a roster limit of 30 players, five of whom could have been foreign players. All player contracts were held by the league, not by the individual teams. Players earned salaries, on average, of around $25,000, with national team players making closer to $40,000. The top players in the competition earned up to $70,000.

The following foreign PRO Rugby players have earned caps for a Tier One nation:

Player	Team	Accomplishments
(New Zealand) Orene Ai'i	San Francisco Rush	2004–05 Sevens player of the year, Super 12 winner with the Blues in 2003
(South Africa) Pedrie Wannenburg	Denver Stampede	20 caps for South Africa, Super 14 winner with the Bulls in 2007, 2009 and 2010, Heineken Cup runner-up with Ulster in 2012, Top 14 winner with Castres in 2013
(Italy) Mirco Bergamasco	Sacramento Express	89 caps for Italy (rugby union), 5 caps for Italy (rugby league), played in the 2003, 2007, and 2011 World Cups, Heineken Cup runner-up in 2005, and Top 14 winner in 2004 and 2007 with Stade Français
(Australia) Timana Tahu	Denver Stampede	4 caps for Australia (rugby union), 5 caps for Australia (rugby league), Super 14 runner-up with the Waratahs in 2008, National Rugby League winner with Newcastle Knights in 2001
(New Zealand) Jamie Mackintosh	Ohio Aviators	1 cap for New Zealand, Air New Zealand Cup Player of the Year with Southland in 2008
(New Zealand) Mils Muliaina	San Francisco Rush	100 caps for New Zealand, World Cup winner in 2011, played in the 2003 and 2007 tournaments
(Tonga) Kurt Morath	San Diego Breakers	30 caps for Tonga, played in the 2011 and 2015 World Cups
(France) Jean-Baptiste Gobelet	San Diego Breakers	162 caps for the French 7s team, Heineken Cup runner-up in 2006 and 2010, and Top 14 winner in 2005 and 2006 with Biarritz Olympique

PRO Rugby also signed several US-capped internationals who had been playing professionally overseas:

Player	Team	Signed from
Takudzwa Ngwenya	San Diego Breakers	(France) Biarritz Olympique
Tom Bliss	San Diego Breakers	(England) Wasps
Eric Fry	Sacramento Express	(England) Newcastle Falcons
Tom Coolican	San Francisco Rush	(Australia) Sydney Stars

== Broadcast ==
Matches were available to stream through prorugby.org or on cable through ONE World Sports. Initially, selected matches were available free to all online through AOL.com, but this came to an abrupt and unexplained end. Through the league's official website, all matches were streamed free to all viewers. ONE World Sports was offered by multiple cable and satellite providers and covered a range of sports, most notably a large selection of soccer, prior to its liquidation.

The league signed a deal with Time Warner Cable to provide streaming of games from Ohio on April 28, 2016.

== Executives ==
- Douglas Schoninger – CEO

== See also ==
- Major League Rugby
- Rugby union in the United States
- USA Rugby
- United States national rugby union team
- Professional sports leagues in the United States
- Rugby Super League (United States)
- Major League Rugby
