= Joel Parker (American football) =

American football player (born 1952)

No. 42, 88
- Position: Wide receiver

Personal information
- Born: April 23, 1952 (age 74); Louisville, Kentucky, U.S.
- Listed height: 6 ft 5 in (1.96 m)
- Listed weight: 212 lb (96 kg)

Career information
- High school: Clearwater (Clearwater, Florida)
- College: Florida
- NFL draft: 1974: 5th round, 113th overall pick

Career history
- New Orleans Saints (1974–1977)

Career NFL statistics
- Receptions: 51
- Receiving yards: 585
- Touchdowns: 6
- Stats at Pro Football Reference

Joseph Lee Parker (born April 23, 1952), nicknamed Joel Parker, is an American former professional football player who was a wide receiver for three seasons in the National Football League (NFL) in the 1970s. He played college football for the Florida Gators, and thereafter he was selected by the New Orleans Saints in the fifth round of the 1974 NFL draft.

== Early life ==
Parker was born in Louisville, Kentucky. He was a two-sport high school All-American in football and basketball for the Clearwater Tornadoes of Clearwater High School in Clearwater, Florida.

== College career ==
Parker accepted an athletic scholarship to attend the University of Florida in Gainesville, Florida, where he played for coach Doug Dickey's Gators football teams from 1971 to 1973. Memorably, as a junior in 1972, he had seven catches for 112 yards and two touchdowns in the Gators' 40–0 victory over the Kentucky Wildcats. In an era when the Gators emphasized a running offense, Parker played in 33 games and compiled 43 receptions for 644 yards and five touchdowns. He graduated from the University of Florida with a bachelor's degree in business administration in 1974.

== Professional career ==
The New Orleans Saints chose him in the fifth round, with the 113th overall pick, of the 1974 NFL draft. He played for the Saints from 1974 to 1977. During his 1974 rookie season, he caught 41 passes for a total of 455 yards, which is regarded as one of the top five seasons by a Saints rookie wide receiver in the history of the franchise. Parker suffered a season-ending knee injury halfway through the 1975 season, and did not play in 1976, but returned for his third and final season with the Saints in 1977. He appeared in 22 regular season games, and finished his three-year NFL career with 51 receptions for 585 yards and six touchdowns.

== See also ==
- Florida Gators football, 1970–79
- History of the New Orleans Saints
- Lee McGriff
- List of Florida Gators in the NFL draft
- List of University of Florida alumni

== Bibliography ==
- 2013 Florida Football Media Guide, University Athletic Association, Gainesville, Florida (2013).
- Carlson, Norm, University of Florida Football Vault: The History of the Florida Gators, Whitman Publishing, LLC, Atlanta, Georgia (2007). ISBN 0-7948-2298-3.
- Golenbock, Peter, Go Gators! An Oral History of Florida's Pursuit of Gridiron Glory, Legends Publishing, LLC, St. Petersburg, Florida (2002). ISBN 0-9650782-1-3.
- Hairston, Jack, Tales from the Gator Swamp: A Collection of the Greatest Gator Stories Ever Told, Sports Publishing, LLC, Champaign, Illinois (2002). ISBN 1-58261-514-4.
- McEwen, Tom, The Gators: A Story of Florida Football, The Strode Publishers, Huntsville, Alabama (1974). ISBN 0-87397-025-X.
- Nash, Noel, ed., The Gainesville Sun Presents The Greatest Moments in Florida Gators Football, Sports Publishing, Inc., Champaign, Illinois (1998). ISBN 1-57167-196-X.
- Proctor, Samuel, & Wright Langley, Gator History: A Pictorial History of the University of Florida, South Star Publishing Company, Gainesville, Florida (1986). ISBN 0-938637-00-2.
