= History of the New Orleans Saints =

Sports team history

The New Orleans Saints are an American football team in the NFL and are based in New Orleans, Louisiana where they were organized in 1967. In 2009, the team won Super Bowl XLIV.

== 1960s: Creation ==
The city of New Orleans established an NFL franchise on November 1, 1966, facilitated by a combination of local activism (most notably by David Dixon and members of the local media, such as New Orleans States-Item sports editor Crozet Duplantier) and political decisions by Senator Russell Long and Congressman Hale Boggs who approved the NFL-AFL merger conditional on giving a franchise to New Orleans.

Six bidders for the franchise included William G. Helis Jr., Herman Lay, John W. Mecom Jr., Louis J. Roussel Jr., Jack Sanders, and Edgar B. Stern Jr.. On December 15, 1966 John W. Mecom Jr. became the majority shareholder and president of the team with a winning bid of $8.5 million. Tom Fears was named head coach.

The team was named "Saints" due to its birthday on the Roman Catholic Church's All Saints Day and New Orleans' largely Catholic demographic. The name was announced on January 9, 1967. The team's original playing ground was Tulane Stadium.

The Saints were placed in the Capitol Division of the NFL's Eastern Conference competing against the Dallas Cowboys, Philadelphia Eagles, and Washington Redskins.

=== Early games ===
The Saints started off well, with a 5–1 preseason record. However, in the first game of the 1967 regular season, they lost to the Los Angeles Rams, 13–27.

The Saints' first win came on November 5 as they defeated the Eagles 31–24. That would be one of their only winning games as they ended the season second-to-last in the league and 3 1/2 games behind Washington in the divisional race.

Their next few seasons continued along similar lines. They scored slightly higher in 1968 when they switched to the Century Division competing against the Cleveland Browns, St. Louis Cardinals, and Pittsburgh Steelers. In 1969, they returned to the Capitol Division (featuring the same division opponents as 1967) and went 5–9.

== 1970–1974 ==
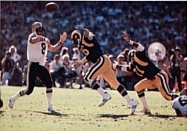
Archie Manning, pictured attempting a pass in 1980, was one of the first players to be inducted into the Saints' Ring of Honor.

The 1970 season saw yet another realignment for the Saints due to the AFL–NFL merger. The Saints were placed in the NFC West, where they would remain through 2001. Their original NFC West competitors – the Atlanta Falcons, Los Angeles (and later, St. Louis) Rams, and San Francisco 49ers – would also remain in the division through 2001 (with the Carolina Panthers joining in 1995), leading to the development of long-standing rivalries.

The season started off poorly for the Saints. After going 1–5–1 in the first seven games, head coach Fears was fired and replaced by J.D. Roberts on November 3. In Roberts' first game as coach, New Orleans trailed the Detroit Lions 17–16, but Tom Dempsey kicked an NFL-record 63-yard field goal to win the game. The record would stand through 2013, when Matt Prater of the Denver Broncos broke it with a 64-yard field goal. This Saints victory, however, would be the last for the season; they lost their last six games to finish 2–11–1, the worst record of the franchise.

In the 1971 NFL draft, the Saints had the second overall pick behind the Boston Patriots. Deciding that a franchise quarterback was necessary, they selected Archie Manning out of University of Mississippi. In the season opener, Manning passed for 218 yards and a touchdown, and ran in another touchdown on the final play to give the Saints a 24–20 win over the Rams. Four weeks later, Manning's performance helped the team earn a 24–14 upset against the Dallas Cowboys. Throughout the season, Manning split the quarterbacking duties with veteran Edd Hargett. Manning ended the season with six passing touchdowns and four rushing touchdowns; he did well enough to become the team's undisputed starter the next season. Despite the promise Manning showed, the Saints' misfortunes continued. During the 1973 preseason, the Saints fired coach Roberts and hired John North, who led the Saints to consecutive 5–9 seasons in 1973 and 1974.

== 1975–1979 ==
In 1975, the Saints moved from Tulane Stadium into the Louisiana Superdome and went down 2–12. North was fired after six games, and Ernie Hefferle was named interim head coach for the final eight games of the season.

For the 1976 season, Hank Stram was hired as head coach; he came with a proven track record (three AFL titles, one Super Bowl win) from his years with the Kansas City Chiefs (formerly the Dallas Texans). However, his talents proved ineffective in his first season, as the Saints went 4–10.

Quarterback Manning sat out the entire season after undergoing elbow surgery just after Stram's hiring, forcing the quarterback duties to be split by backup Bobby Scott and Chicago Bears castoff Bobby Douglass. The 1977 season was not much better as the Saints went 3–11, including a 33–14 loss to the Tampa Bay Buccaneers (the Buccaneers' first victory in the NFL after 26 consecutive losses).

In 1978, Stram was replaced by Dick Nolan. The season saw an improvement in the Saints' fortunes; Manning had the best season of his career up to that point, passing for 3,416 yards and 17 touchdowns. He was named to the NFC Pro Bowl squad for the first time and was also named the NFC's Most Valuable Player by The Sporting News and UPI. The Saints put together a record of 7–9, their best score at the time. The Saints missed the playoffs by losing to the Atlanta Falcons as well as a last-minute loss to the eventual Super Bowl XIII champion Pittsburgh Steelers.

In 1979, the Saints built on the success of the previous year. After a 0–3 start (including a 40–34 overtime loss to the Falcons on the opening day), the Saints won five of their next six games to take sole possession of the NFC West lead after nine games. The Saints playoff hopes were ended when they lost against the Oakland Raiders (their rivals for the NFC West title) and the San Diego Chargers.

The Saints, did manage to beat the Super Bowl-bound Rams in the final game of the regular season putting them at 8–8, the first non-losing season in team history. It was also the first time that the Saints finished higher than third place in their division.

== 1980–1985 ==
In 1980, the Saints had high hopes after their two relatively successful seasons. Instead, despite a strong offense, their defense failed. The team started 0–12, and Dick Nolan was fired; he was replaced by Dick Stanfel, who lost two games (including one in San Francisco where the Saints blew a 28-point lead). They managed to win against the New York Jets, who finished with the league's second worst record at 4–12, by a point.

The Saints then lost their last game of the season to the New England Patriots to finish 1–15, the worst mark in team history and (at the time) the worst for a 16-game schedule. A local journalist and radio/TV personality, Buddy Diliberto, wore a paper grocery bag over his head to promote the brown bag special of Sonic, the Saints' sponsor at the time. Many fans took to wearing bags over their heads when attending games. The moniker "Aints" was also born due to the ineptitude of the 1980 Saints.

In 1981, ex-Houston Oilers head coach Bum Phillips was hired as head coach and general manager. The dismal 1980 season meant that the Saints would get the first pick in the 1981 NFL draft. They selected Heisman-winning running back George Rogers out of South Carolina, a move which in hindsight proved to be a huge blunder; the New York Giants, drafting second, selected future Hall of Fame linebacker Lawrence Taylor from North Carolina. Rogers was the team's workhorse, playing in all but one game and averaging more than 25 carries a game. He ran for a total of 1,674 yards, making him the NFL rushing champion. However, his performances were not enough to make the Saints a winning club. They finished the season 4–12.

In 1982, the Saints signed former Oakland Raiders and Houston Oilers quarterback Ken Stabler and traded Archie Manning to the Oilers. Two games into the season, the Saints were 1–1, but a players' strike led to the cancellation of seven games. When the season resumed, the Saints won two games in a row to take their record to 3–1, but they lost four games in a row before winning their last game, 35–6 over the Falcons. They finished 4–5, but missed out on qualifying for the playoffs (expanded to 16 teams due to the strike) on a tiebreaker.

1983 saw the Saints improve on the previous season once again. Their playoff hopes came down to the final game of the season, when they hosted the Rams. Los Angeles' Mike Lansford kicked a 42-yard field goal with six seconds remaining to give the Rams the victory ending the Saints' season. The Saints finished 8–8, tying their previous best season record.

Eight weeks after the conclusion of the 1983 season, the Saints traded their number one pick in the 1984 NFL draft to the New York Jets for quarterback Richard Todd, who was being phased out in favor of rookie Ken O'Brien. The Saints won for the first time on Monday Night Football by defeating the Pittsburgh Steelers in the Superdome, but a three-game losing streak late in the season dropped the Saints to 7–9.

In 1984 John Mecom sold the team to Tom Benson, a native New Orleanian who owned numerous car dealerships throughout the New Orleans area.

In 1985, the Saints started off 3–2, but then lost six games in a row. Bum Phillips resigned twelve games into the season, and his son Wade Phillips, the Saints' defensive coordinator, was named interim coach. The Saints ended the season 5–11.

== Jim Mora era (1986–1996) ==
Before the 1986 season, Saints owner Tom Benson put his stamp on the team by making two important hires: first, he named Jim Finks president and general manager; then, he named Jim Mora head coach. The Saints' offense struggled throughout the year but player Rueben Mayes was named NFC Rookie of the Year.

The 1987 Saints started 1–1; then, another player strike followed. This time, however, replacement players were used until the regular players ended their strike. As a result, the season was only one game shorter than usual. The Saints went 2–1 with replacement players as they were led by their quarterback, New Orleans native John Fourcade.

When the regular players returned, they lost their first game against the San Francisco 49ers. Afterwards, they ran off a nine-game winning streak to close out the season – a first for the team. A loss against San Francisco, however, would keep the Saints from being NFC West Champions. On January 3, 1988; after 20 years, the Saints finally took part in the NFL playoffs and Mora and Finks were named NFL Coach and Executive of the Year, respectively.

The 1988 Saints looked to return to the playoffs. After starting the season with a loss to the 49ers, the Saints bounced back with a seven-game win streak. After the streak, though, the Saints lost five of their next seven games. They won their last game of the season, against Atlanta, but they missed out on the playoffs due to tiebreakers.

The 1989 Saints managed to finish 9–7, but thanks to other strong performances in the NFC, they missed the playoffs by two games.

In 1990, the Saints started off poorly, going 2–5 in their first seven games. However, they turned their season around with close wins in their final two games of the season giving them an 8–8 record.

In 1991, the Saints started with a seven-game win streak, a team-record best start. With the 7–0 start, the Saints opened up a four-game lead over the rest of the division. But then the Saints lost five of their next seven games, giving Atlanta and San Francisco a shot at claiming the division title. However, the Saints regrouped in the final two games of the season, giving the Saints their first-ever division title.

In 1992, the Saints attempted to defend their division title, but the 49ers, swept the season series.

The 1993 season would see the Saints start their decline from regular playoff contender to league losses once again.

In 1995, the Saints again finished 7–9 in the NFC West, which was newly expanded to include the Carolina Panthers. Due to tiebreakers, the Saints finished in last place in the division.

In 1996, Mora resigned after more than ten years with the franchise. He finished his Saints tenure with 93 wins and 78 losses, making him far and away the most successful Saints coach ever. Rick Venturi was named interim head coach.

== Mike Ditka era (1997–1999) ==
Before the 1997 season, Tom Benson named legendary Chicago Bears head coach Mike Ditka as the Saints coach, leading to optimism that he would be able to win a Super Bowl with the Saints as he had done with the Bears. However, the Ditka era would be a tumultuous time for the organization.

In 1997, Ditka led the team to a 6–10 record, a three-game improvement from the previous season; the team was marked by strong defense (anchored by defensive end Joe Johnson, middle linebacker Winfred Tubbs, and veteran cornerback Eric Allen, among others) and inconsistent offense.

The 1998 season was even more chaotic. Starting quarterback Billy Joe Hobert was lost for the year in the season-opening win against the St. Louis Rams. Later in the season, the team claimed quarterback Kerry Collins off the waiver wire. His lackluster performance, coupled with a highly publicized DUI arrest, led Ditka to state that the team would not seek to re-sign Collins. The Saints finished 6–10 once again.

In the months before the 1999 NFL draft, Ditka became enamored with Texas running back Ricky Williams, the Heisman Trophy winner who'd set an NCAA record for career rushing yards with the Longhorns. Ditka's remarks that he'd "trade his entire draft" for the standout runner were well-publicized; holding the No. 13 overall pick, the Saints needed to trade up to have a chance at selecting Williams.

They got their chance to do so when the Indianapolis Colts selected Miami running back Edgerrin James with the No. 4 overall pick. The Saints orchestrated a three-way trade with the Washington Redskins and the Chicago Bears that involved the Saints taking Washington's No. 5 overall pick – and therefore, Williams – in exchange for all the Saints' remaining 1999 draft picks and their 1st- and 3rd-rounders in 2000.

The trade drew mixed reactions from Saints fans. In the days after the draft, Ditka boldly predicted that the Saints would go to the Super Bowl.

Fan opinion began to solidify against Ditka when it became clear that his prediction would not come true. The Saints' 1999 season was marked by yet more inconsistency at quarterback, a porous defense, and a hobbled Williams, who struggled with a high ankle sprain and an elbow injury in his rookie year. The Saints finished 3–13. Soon after the season ended, owner Tom Benson fired Ditka, the entire coaching staff, and general manager Bill Kuharich.

The Ditka era in New Orleans saw seven different starters at quarterback in three seasons (Heath Shuler, Danny Wuerffel, Doug Nussmeier, Billy Joe Hobert, Billy Joe Tolliver, Kerry Collins, and Jake Delhomme) and a defense which went from top-ten to near the bottom of the league in nearly every statistical category.

== Jim Haslett era (2000–2005) ==
To replace Ditka and Kuharich, Tom Benson settled on Randy Mueller, formerly of the Seattle Seahawks, as general manager, and Pittsburgh Steelers defensive coordinator Jim Haslett as head coach. Mueller shook up the roster, bringing in a squad of fresh talent via free agency: wide receivers Jake Reed and Joe Horn, quarterback Jeff Blake, tight end Andrew Glover, defensive tackle Norman Hand, cornerback Fred Thomas, safety Chris Oldham, and linebacker Darrin Smith, among others. Lacking their top draft pick because of the Williams trade (a pick the Redskins would use to draft linebacker LaVar Arrington), New Orleans selected defensive end Darren Howard early in the 2nd round.

Inspired by Terrell Davis and the Denver Broncos' offense, new offensive coordinator Mike McCarthy implemented a form of the West Coast Offense with Ricky Williams as the focal point: a run-first attack designed to open up passing lanes and create opportunities for the occasional deep ball.

After a sputtering 1–3 start, the Saints found their groove, winning six straight games behind Williams and an opportunistic defense. The 2000 season marked the surprising emergence of Joe Horn, who'd previously been a backup receiver with the Kansas City Chiefs but was flourishing as Blake's main target.

Adversity struck, however, with injuries in consecutive games to Williams and Blake, forcing the team to rely on backups at both positions for the remainder of the season. Blake's injury presented an opportunity for quarterback Aaron Brooks, who led the team to two critical road wins: an upset over the defending champion St. Louis Rams and a late comeback against the San Francisco 49ers, keeping the Saints atop the NFC West. A Week 16 victory over the Atlanta Falcons, coupled with a St. Louis loss the following night, gave the Saints a 10–5 record, a playoff berth, and their first division title since 1991.

In the regular season finale, the Saints lost to the Rams, setting up a rematch between the two teams in the wild card playoff round. Though they lost Horn to an injury early in the game, the Saints managed to surge ahead to a 31–7 lead early in the 4th quarter and New Orleans secured its first-ever playoff win. The final score was 31–28.

The 2000 season was viewed as an overwhelming success by the fans and the media. Haslett and Mueller were recognized by the NFL as Coach of the Year and Executive of the Year, respectively. Five Saints were selected to the Pro Bowl: Horn, left tackle Willie Roaf, defensive linemen Joe Johnson and La'Roi Glover, and linebacker Keith Mitchell. Horn set a franchise record with 1,340 receiving yards and emerged as a playmaker and tenacious possession receiver. Despite his injury, Williams rushed for 1,000 yards and eight touchdowns in 10 games.

=== 2001 ===
The next five seasons failed to meet the raised expectations of fans and media. The 2001 season established a trend of team inconsistency from week to week; though the Saints engineered a stirring comeback from several touchdowns down to beat the Rams on the road, they also collapsed at the end of the season, losing their last four games by embarrassing margins to finish 7–9. New Orleans was outscored 160–40 in its final four games and was shut out 38–0 by San Francisco in the finale at home in the Saints' final game as a member of the NFC West.

The season was notable for the curious behavior of Albert Connell, a wide receiver acquired in the offseason and intended to be the long-term starter opposite Joe Horn. Connell was accused of, and subsequently admitted to, stealing over $4,000 from teammate Deuce McAllister, though he claimed the theft was just a prank. Connell caught only 12 passes in 11 games with the Saints; the team suspended him for the last four games of the season and later terminated his contract.

In the offseason, the Saints – having drafted running back Deuce McAllister in the first round of the 2001 NFL draft – traded starter Ricky Williams to the Miami Dolphins. The trade ended up giving the Saints two 1st-round picks.

=== 2002 ===
The 2002 season started with promise (in the now geographically accurate NFC South division) but finished in familiar fashion. The Saints, after starting 6–1, finished at 9–7 and missed the playoffs once again.

Jim Haslett and his coaching staff drew criticism for not benching starting quarterback Aaron Brooks in any of the season's final games. Brooks had been hobbled by a shoulder injury, and though both he and Haslett insisted the injury would not affect his play, Brooks' performance suggested otherwise. Over the last six games of the season, Brooks completed only 47% of his passes, throwing for six touchdowns and five interceptions and losing six fumbles. His passer rating over those six games was 66.7, far less than his 80.1 rating over the entire season.

Backing up Brooks in 2002 was fan-favorite Jake Delhomme, who later signed with the Carolina Panthers, leading them to Super Bowl XXXVIII.

=== 2003 ===
The 2003 season started off poorly for the Saints, going 1–4 in their first five games, including a 55–21 blowout loss at home against the Indianapolis Colts. The Saints, however, would rebound somewhat from their poor start and finish the season 8–8. McAllister ran for a career-high 1,641 yards.

=== 2004 ===
The 2004 season saw the Saints struggle out of the gate and the season finished in heartbreaking fashion, causing many to think that Haslett would have been fired if not for his team's four-game win streak to end the season.

=== 2005: Hurricane Katrina ===
Going into the 2005 season, the Saints were optimistic that they could build on their good results at the end of 2004. But when Hurricane Katrina struck, the Saints were thrown into chaos with the rest of their city. The Saints were forced to temporarily relocate their headquarters to San Antonio, Texas. The Saints would eventually finish the season with a 3–13 record and head coach Jim Haslett losing his job.

== Sean Payton/Drew Brees era (2006–2022) ==
=== 2006: Brees and Payton first year ===
The 2006 Saints orchestrated one of the more remarkable turnarounds in NFL history, as they were the first team to go from 3–13 to a conference title game the next season. Sean Payton, who was the Dallas Cowboys assistant head coach and passing game coordinator under Bill Parcells, was hired as head coach. In his first move as coach, he released almost half of the roster, most notably inconsistent quarterback Aaron Brooks.

The Saints were aggressive in free agency, signing former San Diego Chargers quarterback Drew Brees, who had been released after suffering a career-threatening injury to his throwing shoulder during the last game of the 2005 season and was still recovering from surgery at that time. The Saints gambled on his ability to recover in time for the season and signed him to a major long-term contract. His signing would become a major turning point for the Saints.

On the eve before the draft on April 29, news broke that the Houston Texans could not reach an agreement with Reggie Bush and instead reached a deal with defensive end Mario Williams as the No. 1 pick. When the team found out that Bush would be available, they selected the USC running back with their No. 2 pick. In that draft, the Saints also picked an unknown player in the 7th-round who would become a standout: wide receiver Marques Colston from Hofstra as the 252nd pick.

When preseason got underway, the Saints started out strong in a victory over the Tennessee Titans, which featured a dazzling run by Reggie Bush where he reversed his direction for a big run.

The 2006 regular season officially began for the Saints with a road win against the Cleveland Browns, with Bush accounting for 129 yards from scrimmage, while Colston caught a touchdown pass from Brees.

New Orleans entered a midseason slump, losing three of four by Week 10 before going on a three-game win streak. They defeated the Atlanta Falcons, San Francisco 49ers, and Dallas Cowboys in convincing fashion.

The Saints concluded the regular season at 10–6, winning the NFC South title and, for the first time in the team's history, securing a first-round bye in the playoffs.

The Saints' divisional playoff game would be a Week 6 rematch with the Philadelphia Eagles. New Orleans won its first divisional playoff game in team history, 27–24, and only the second playoff win in franchise history. The Saints then traveled to Chicago to face the Chicago Bears in the team's first ever NFC Championship appearance, where they ended up falling short in the title game, 39–14.

New Orleans led the NFL in total yards gained and passing yards in the 2006 season. Drew Brees set new Saints single-season records in passes completed (356), passer rating (96.2), and passing yards (4,418). The team sent three players to the 2007 Pro Bowl: Brees, defensive end Will Smith, and offensive tackle Jammal Brown.

=== 2007–2008 ===
The 2007 regular season began with a matchup against the defending Super Bowl champion Indianapolis Colts, but the Saints suffered a 41–10 loss and the losses continued. The Saints finally managed a victory in Week 6 by defeating the Seattle Seahawks 28–17. A loss to the Chicago Bears in the regular season finale ended the Saints' season with a 7–9 record.

In 2008, the Saints were selected for that year's International Series game in London, where they defeated the San Diego Chargers 37–32. The remainder of the season was an uneven string of games, and after being defeated by the Carolina Panthers on December 28, the team ended its 2008 campaign with an 8–8 record.

=== 2009: The Road to Super Bowl XLIV ===
New Orleans started off 2009 with a win against the Detroit Lions. They proceeded to win 12 straight games en route to a 13-3 record and an NFC South title. The Saints easily beat the Arizona Cardinals in the divisional round, advancing to the NFC championship where they would face the Minnesota Vikings. The two teams waged an epic struggle through all four-quarters. Minnesota quarterback Brett Favre was hit several times by the New Orleans defensive line, and there were multiple penalties, timeouts, and booth reviews of questionable plays. Although the Vikings never trailed by more than a touchdown, they could not gain a lead, and as the 4th quarter was drawing to a close, Favre threw an ill-advised pass across the middle of the field, which was intercepted by Saints cornerback Tracy Porter. The game went into overtime, and New Orleans got possession of the ball after winning the coin toss. Kicker Garrett Hartley made a 40-yard field goal, sending the Saints to Super Bowl XLIV.

The Super Bowl was played in Miami against the Colts, who had won Super Bowl XLI there three years earlier. Indianapolis jumped out to a 10–0 lead by the end of the 1st quarter. The Saints were unable to score a touchdown in the first half, and instead settled for two long Hartley field goals, making the score 10–6 at halftime. The 3rd quarter opened with New Orleans executing a surprise onside kick, and both teams got into an argument over who got hold of the ball.

The Saints were ultimately ruled to have recovered it. A screen pass by Drew Brees to running back Pierre Thomas was good for a touchdown, giving the Saints a 13–10 lead, their first of the game. After another Colts touchdown, Hartley kicked another field goal to make it a 17–16 game. The Saints regained the lead with 5:42 remaining in the 4th quarter; a 2-yard touchdown pass from Brees to tight end Jeremy Shockey, followed by a two-point conversion by Lance Moore, made it a 24–17 Saints lead. On the Colts' ensuing drive, quarterback Peyton Manning was intercepted by Tracy Porter, who returned it 74 yards for the game-clinching touchdown. A strong defensive effort by New Orleans halted the Colts' attempt at another scoring drive, and the game ended 31–17.

The Saints had finally won a championship sending the city of New Orleans, and the region, into celebration.

=== 2010–2011 ===
The Saints did not quite live up to their 2009 level of play the following season. The Saints would finish the regular season with an 11-5 record, placing 2nd in the NFC South behind division winner Atlanta.

In the wild card round of the playoffs, the Saints travelled to Seattle to lose 41-36 to the Seahawks, ending hopes for a Superbowl repeat.

The Saints fared better in the 2011 season, finishing with a 13-3 record and winning the NFC South title once again. Drew Brees passed for 5,476 yards, breaking the single-season passing record held by Dan Marino. Despite the team’s success, they finished as the #3 seed behind the San Francisco 49ers, earning a wild card berth. After beating the Detroit Lions in the Superdome, they traveled to Candlestick Park to face the #2 seed 49ers. In an instant-classic, back-and-forth battle featuring four lead changes in the final four minutes, the Saints lost 36-32 after 49ers quarterback Alex Smith threw a game-winning touchdown pass with 9 seconds left on the clock.

==== Bountygate scandal ====
On March 2, 2012, the NFL announced the findings of an investigation of a bounty program that former defensive coordinator Gregg Williams and over two dozen defensive players maintained. The program rewarded cash to players for violent hits on opposing players that took place during the 2009–2011 seasons. Bounties were placed on four specific players: quarterbacks Brett Favre, Cam Newton, Aaron Rodgers, and Kurt Warner.

The NFL hit the Saints hard with punishments. Williams, who became defensive coordinator with the St. Louis Rams, was suspended indefinitely. Head coach Sean Payton was suspended for the entire 2012 season. Although he did not participate in the bounty program, he never told anyone to stop it. General manager Mickey Loomis was suspended for the first eight regular season games, as he ignored an order from owner Tom Benson to ensure that the program was stopped. Assistant head coach Joe Vitt (who was named interim head coach during Payton's suspension) was banned for the first six regular season games.

The Saints were also fined $500,000 and stripped of their 2nd-round picks in the 2012 and 2013 NFL drafts. Payton began his suspension April 15 after his appeal was rejected. Loomis and Vitt also appealed their suspensions, but they were upheld. The NFL later announced punishments to four current and former Saints players. Linebacker Jonathan Vilma was suspended for the entire 2012 season; he twice offered $10,000 to anyone who knocked out Warner and Favre in the 2009 playoffs. Defensive lineman Anthony Hargrove was suspended for the first eight games of the 2012 season. Will Smith was suspended for four games, and Scott Fujita (now with the Cleveland Browns) received a three-game ban. All of the suspensions were without pay. A grievance was filed on behalf of the suspended players, but it was rejected. All of the players appealed to Commissioner Roger Goodell.

=== 2012 ===
The 2012 season began in disappointing fashion with four straight losses to the Washington Redskins, Carolina Panthers, Kansas City Chiefs, and Green Bay Packers. Then the Saints went on to win five of their next six games, including handing division rival Atlanta its first loss of the season. The 2012 season ended with a 7–9 record for the Saints, their first losing season since 2007.

The Saints finished 1st in the NFL in passing yards per game and 2nd in overall offense, but they were last in the league in overall defense.

=== 2013 ===
As the team tried to leave the Bountygate in the past, Sean Payton returned to the team as Head Coach following the 2012 season. 2013 prove to be a successful season for the Saints, going undefeated at home and going 11–5, making it into the playoffs as a 6th seed. They manage to win their first road playoff game in franchise history against the Philadelphia Eagles, 26–24. They advanced to 1st seed Seattle Seahawks, getting defeated by the eventual Super Bowl champions 15–23.

=== 2014–2015 ===
2014 was not a memorable year for the Saints. Despite being 2nd in total offense, they were near the bottom of the league defensively. The team finished 7-9 and were eliminated from playoff contention after a 30-14 loss to their divisional rival Atlanta Falcons in the second-to-last week of the regular season.

In 2015 they finished 7–9 again.

=== 2016: 50th season ===
The Saints played their 50th season in 2016. Drew Brees threw for over 5,000 yards for the fifth time in his career. Brandin Cooks and Michael Thomas, the 47th overall pick in the 2016 NFL draft, both had over 1,000 yards receiving. Running back Mark Ingram II broke 1,000 yards rushing for the first time in his career. Despite having the top scoring offense in the league, the Saints finished 7–9 for the third consecutive year. This put them in place for the 11th overall pick in the 2017 NFL draft.

=== 2017: Return to the playoffs ===
Before the season, the Saints acquired longtime Viking and All-Pro running back Adrian Peterson. However, after playing in only four games in which he rushed for 81 total yards, the Saints traded Peterson to the Arizona Cardinals. Alvin Kamara would go on to have a successful rookie season as the Saints finished the year with an 11–5 record to return to the playoffs after a three-year absence.

However, after defeating their division rivals, the Carolina Panthers, the Saints were eliminated from the playoffs after losing to the Minnesota Vikings when a missed tackle allowed Stefon Diggs to score the game-winning touchdown on the final play.

=== 2018: Death of owner Tom Benson and NFC game controversy ===
In 2018, longtime owner Tom Benson died and his wife, Gayle, assumed ownership duties.

The Saints enjoyed a strong season as they finished the year with a 13–3 record. Highlights of this season included Drew Brees surpassing Peyton Manning for most career touchdown passes during a win against the Washington Redskins; he also beat the Ravens for the first time in his career.

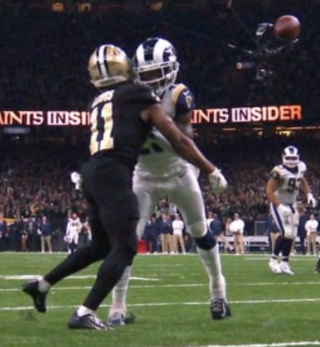
The moment Los Angeles Rams cornerback Nickell Robey-Coleman committed an uncalled defensive pass interference penalty on Tommylee Lewis during the 2018 NFC Championship Game

The Saints defeated the defending Super Bowl champion Eagles in the Divisional round, but controversially lost to the Los Angeles Rams, led by 32-year-old head coach Sean McVay, in the title game.

Saints fans later cried out against an uncalled pass interference against Rams cornerback Nickell Robey-Coleman call that was a pivotal turning point in the fourth quarter. This ruling lead to numerous lawsuits against the NFL from Saints fans and led to a rule change allowing challenge flags to be used on pass interference calls.

=== 2019 ===
In 2019, the Saints had another year of success. The Saints participated in one of the highest scoring games in NFL history in Week 14, putting up 46 points and two two-score leads against the San Francisco 49ers, only to lose on a last-second field goal 48–46. Overall, the Saints finished 13–3 and secured their third straight division title.

=== 2020: End of an era ===
The 2020 season for the Saints went back and forth. Despite starting the season 1–2, the Saints acquired nine straight victories, and were soon atop the NFC. Overall, the Saints went 12–4, and made history for not only completing the first-ever sweep of the NFC South, but sweeping their division for the first time in franchise history.

The New Orleans Saints won their first playoff game in 2 years with a victory over the Bears in the wild card round, 21–9, but, despite sweeping them in the regular season, the Saints then lost to their division rival and eventual Super Bowl champion Buccaneers in the divisional round, 30-20.

That game marked the end of an era as Drew Brees announced his retirement on March 14, 2021, the 15th anniversary of him signing with the Saints, on Instagram with the help of his children.

=== 2021: Missing the playoffs ===
The 2021 season was the Saints' first season without Brees on the roster since 2005. Jameis Winston was named the starting quarterback to begin the 2021 season, but was lost for the season after suffering a torn ACL during a Halloween game against his former team, Tampa Bay. Wide receiver Michael Thomas also missed the entire season recovering from ankle surgery. The Saints missed the playoffs for the first time since 2016, finishing 9–8.

== Post-Payton era (2022–present) ==
On January 25, 2022, Sean Payton announced his retirement. During his tenure, Payton became the winningest coach in franchise history. Defensive Coordinator Dennis Allen was named the Saints head coach on February 8, 2022.

In the 2022 season, the Saints missed the playoffs for the second straight season and finished with a 7–10 record, their first losing record since 2016.

On March 6, 2023, the Saints acquired quarterback Derek Carr from the Las Vegas Raiders. The Saints finished the 2023 season with a record of 9-8, missing the playoffs for the third straight season, their first time missing the playoffs for 3 straight years since 2014–2016.

After starting with a 2–7 record, on November 4, 2024, the Saints fired Dennis Allen. Assistant Head coach and special teams coach Darren Rizzi took over interim head coaching duties for the rest of the season. The Saints would finish with a record of 5-12.

The Saints hired Kellen Moore as head coach on February 11, 2025. Moore was previously the offensive coordinator of the Philadelphia Eagles, who had just won Super Bowl LIX in the Caesars Superdome two days prior. On May 10, 2025, Carr announced his retirement from the NFL after 11 seasons.

The Saints finished the 2025 season with a record of 6-11, missing the playoffs for a fifth consecutive year. Spencer Rattler started the team's first eight games but was benched during their week 8 matchup against the Tampa Bay Buccaneers in favor of rookie Tyler Shough. Shough would start the following week against the Los Angeles Rams and would remain the starter for the remainder of the season.
