= National Rugby Football League =

American rugby union league

- Sport: Rugby union
- Founded: 2014; 12 years ago
- No. of teams: TBD
- Country: United States
- Continent: North America
- Website: thenrfl.com

National Rugby Football League (NRFL) is a professional rugby union league headquartered in Minneapolis, Minnesota. Founded in 2014, the NRFL aims to establish itself as the premier rugby competition in North America.

== Team ==
The NRFL boasts an list of executives and strategic partners from sports organizations such as the NFL, NASCAR, MLB, NBA, Nike, and Fox, including: Michael Clements (CEO), Steve Ryan (Managing Director), Rick White (NRFL Properties), Jeff Diamond (Team Operations), Mick Byrne (Director of Rugby), Craig Robbins (Investor Relations), Geoff Belinfante, (Media), Ashley Horobin (Manager, High-Performance), Dr. Ralph Bovard (Chief Medical), Lynda Wilson (General Counsel) and Karl Neset (Financial Officer).

The league also has an Advisory Board composed of notable members of the sports world, including: Bo Jackson, Leigh Steinberg, Metta World Peace, Steve LaCroix, Patrick Crakes, and Rob Thompson.

== History ==
More than 130 players, including nearly 50 with NFL experience, participated in the NRFL's first combine held in Minneapolis in April 2014. The second combine took place January 12–15 in Los Angeles, California at the LA Memorial Coliseum.

The NRFL plans to re-launch under a league-owned-and-operated model. The NRFL will function exclusively in the U.S., aiming to launch 8 founding teams prior to the Rugby World Cup being held in the U.S. in 2031.

The NRFL will also have a media and entertainment platform dedicated to NRFL content. The content side of the league, which has been dubbed “NRFL Studios”, aims to create both an NRFL-centric docuseries, as well as scripted rugby films.

== Athletes ==
As the population of American rugby players continues to grow, the NRFL aims to be a league for both lifelong rugby players, as well as athletes from other professional sports leagues. The league’s player recruitment methods are focused on targeting current and former NFL or collegiate football players.

In April 2020, CEO Michael Clements partnered with NFL Alumni, the retired players’ advocacy group for the world’s richest sports league. The partnership aims to collaborate on a high-performance center for tackle-sport athletes that will serve as a potential feeding ground for both leagues.
