= 2008 Pacific Rugby Cup =

Rugby union tournament

- Countries: Fiji (2 teams); Samoa (2 teams); Tonga (2 teams)
- Champions: (Tonga) Tautahi Gold
- Matches played: 16

The IRB Pacific Rugby Cup 2008 was the third edition of the Pacific Rugby Cup competition. First held in 2006, the 2008 edition, like its predecessors, featured 6 representative rugby union football teams; 2 from each of the three Pacific rugby unions - Fiji, Samoa and Tonga.

Tautahi Gold beat Upolu Samoa 11 points to 3 in the grand final match to win the Pacific Rugby Cup for 2008, becoming the first Tongan team, and the first team outside of Samoa, to win the trophy.

== Teams ==
The 6 participating teams were:

- Upolu Samoa and Savaii Samoa from Samoa
- Fiji Warriors and Fiji Barbarians from Fiji
- Tau'uta Reds and Tautahi Gold from Tonga

== Format and schedule ==
The teams played a single round robin (home or away) series. The two top teams in the final standings met in the grand final match, with the first ranking team awarded home advantage.

The 2008 tournament followed the completion of Fiji's Colonial Cup, Samoa's National Provincial Championship and Tonga's Provincial Championship and provided the coaches of the three national teams with a competitive player development pathway just ahead of the IRB Pacific Nations Cup 2008.

Upolu Samoa began its title defence away to 2007 beaten finalists Tau'uta Reds in Nuku'alofa on April 19, while Fiji Warriors faced Tautahi Gold in Lautoka and 2006 champions Savaii Samoa played Fiji Barbarians in Apia. Four further rounds followed on consecutive weekends before the top two ranked teams contested the Grand Final on May 24.

== Table ==
Team	Played	Won	Drawn	Lost	For	Against	Point Difference	Bonus Points	Points
Upolu Samoa	5	4	0	1	90	49	+41	1	17
Tautahi Gold	5	3	0	2	97	75	+22	1	13
Savaii Samoa	5	3	0	2	81	81	0	1	13
Fiji Barbarians	5	2	0	3	72	90	-18	2	10
Tau'uta Reds	5	2	0	3	84	95	-11	1	9
Fiji Warriors	5	1	0	4	70	104	-34	3	7
Source: oceaniarugby.com

Competition rules
Points breakdown:
4 points for a win
2 points for a draw
1 bonus point for a loss by seven points or less
1 bonus point for scoring four or more tries in a match
Classification:
Teams standings are calculated as follows:
Most log points accumulated from all matches
Most log points accumulated in matches between tied teams
Highest difference between points scored for and against accumulated from all matches
Most points scored accumulated from all matches

== Match results ==
=== Round One ===
2008-04-18	Fiji Warriors	21-19	Tautahi Gold	Churchill Park, Lautoka

Savai'i Samoa	17-13	Fiji Barbarians	Apia Park, Apia

2008-04-19	Tau'uta Reds	12-20	Upolu Samoa	Teufaiva Stadium, Nukuʻalofa

=== Round Two ===
2008-04-25	Fiji Barbarians	5-22	Upolu Samoa	National Stadium, Suva

2008-04-26	Savai'i Samoa	20-18	Fiji Warriors	Prince Edwards Park, Savaii

Tau'uta Reds	11-21	Tautahi Gold	Teufaiva Stadium, Nukuʻalofa

=== Round Three ===
2008-05-02	Upolu Samoa	13-8	Fiji Warriors	Apia Park, Apia

Tautahi Gold	27-17	Savai'i Samoa	Teufaiva Stadium, Nukuʻalofa

2008-05-03	Fiji Barbarians	25-24	Tau'uta Reds	Lawaqa Park, Sigatoka

=== Round Four ===
2008-05-09	Fiji Warriors	16-23	Tau'uta Reds	Prince Charles Park, Nadi

Tautahi Gold	20-0	Fiji Barbarians	Teufaiva Stadium, Nukuʻalofa

2008-05-10	Upolu Samoa	9-14	Savai'i Samoa	Apia Park, Apia

=== Round Five ===
2008-05-16	Tau'uta Reds	14-13	Savai'i Samoa	Teufaiva Stadium, Nukuʻalofa

2008-05-17	Fiji Warriors	7-29	Fiji Barbarians	Subrail Park, Labasa

Upolu Samoa	26-10	Tautahi Gold	Apia Park, Apia

== Final ==
2008-05-24	Upolu Samoa	3-11	Tautahi Gold	Apia Park, Apia
