= 2010 Pacific Rugby Cup =

Rugby union tournament

- Countries: Fiji (2 teams); Samoa (2 teams); Tonga (2 teams)
- Champions: Fiji Warriors
- Matches played: 16

The 2010 Pacific Rugby Cup was the fifth edition of the Pacific Rugby Cup competition. First held in 2006, the 2010 edition, like its predecessors, featured 6 representative rugby union football teams; 2 from each of the three Pacific rugby unions - Fiji, Samoa and Tonga.

Fiji Warriors won the championship, defeating Fiji Barbarians in the final.

== Teams and format ==
The 6 participating teams were:

- Upolu Samoa and Savaii Samoa from Samoa
- Fiji Warriors and Fiji Barbarians from Fiji
- Tau'uta Reds and Tautahi Gold from Tonga

The teams played a single round robin (home or away) series. The two top teams in the final standings met in the grand final match, with the first ranking team awarded home advantage.

== Stadiums ==
| Team | Stadium |
|---|---|
| Fiji Barbarians | Churchill Park, Lautoka; Lawaqa Park, Sigatoka |
| Fiji Warriors | Churchill Park, Lautoka; Lawaqa Park, Sigatoka |
| Savai'i Samoa | Apia Park, Apia; Prince Edward Park, Iva |
| Tautahi Gold | Teufaiva Stadium, Nukuʻalofa |
| Tau'uta Reds | Teufaiva Stadium, Nukuʻalofa |
| Upolu Samoa | Apia Park, Apia |

== Table ==
| Team | Played | Won | Drawn | Lost | For | Against | Point difference | Bonus points | Points |
|---|---|---|---|---|---|---|---|---|---|
| Fiji Warriors | 5 | 4 | 0 | 1 | 155 | 73 | +82 | 3 | 19 |
| Fiji Barbarians | 5 | 4 | 0 | 1 | 145 | 116 | +29 | 3 | 19 |
| Tautahi Gold | 5 | 3 | 0 | 2 | 102 | 93 | +9 | 2 | 14 |
| Savaii Samoa | 5 | 2 | 0 | 3 | 105 | 110 | −5 | 2 | 10 |
| Upolu Samoa | 5 | 1 | 0 | 4 | 94 | 122 | −28 | 3 | 7 |
| Tau'uta Reds | 5 | 1 | 0 | 4 | 82 | 169 | −87 | 1 | 5 |
Source: oceaniarugby.com

Competition rules
Points breakdown:
4 points for a win
2 points for a draw
1 bonus point for a loss by seven points or less
1 bonus point for scoring four or more tries in a match
Classification:
Teams standings are calculated as follows:
Most log points accumulated from all matches
Most log points accumulated in matches between tied teams
Highest difference between points scored for and against accumulated from all matches
Most points scored accumulated from all matches

== Match results ==
=== Round 1 ===
| 05/05/10 | Upolu Samoa | 10 – 23 | Savaii Samoa | Apia Park, Samoa |
| 5:30pm |

| 06/05/10 | Tautahi Gold | 26 – 10 | Tau'uta Reds | Teufaiva Stadium, Nuku'alofa |
| 4:00pm |

| 06/05/10 | Fiji Warriors | 20 – 23 | Fiji Barbarians | Lawaqa Park, Sigatoka |
| 5:00pm |

=== Round 2 ===
| 10/05/10 | Savaii Samoa | 14 – 16 | Tautahi Gold | Churchill Park, Lautoka |
| 11:00am |

| 10/05/10 | Tau'uta Reds | 30 – 43 | Fiji Barbarians | Churchill Park, Lautoka |
| 2:00pm |

| 10/05/10 | Upolu Samoa | 17 – 24 | Fiji Warriors | Churchill Park, Lautoka |
| 5:00pm |

=== Round 3 ===
| 14/05/10 | Upolu Samoa | 18 – 19 | Tau'uta Reds | Churchill Park, Lautoka |
| 11:00am |

| 14/05/10 | Fiji Warriors | 42 – 20 | Savaii Samoa | Churchill Park, Lautoka |
| 2:00pm |

| 14/05/10 | Tautahi Gold | 27 – 24 | Fiji Barbarians | Churchill Park, Lautoka |
| 5:00pm |

=== Round 4 ===
| 18/05/10 | Tau'uta Reds | 23 – 34 | Savaii Samoa | Prince Charles Park, Nadi |
| 11:00am |

| 18/05/10 | Fiji Barbarians | 36 – 25 | Upolu Samoa | Prince Charles Park, Nadi |
| 2:00pm |

| 18/05/10 | Fiji Warriors | 21 – 13 | Tautahi Gold | Prince Charles Park, Nadi |
| 5:00pm |

=== Round 5 ===
| 22/05/10 | Tautahi Gold | 20 – 24 | Upolu Samoa | Lawaqa Park, Sigatoka |
| 11:00am |

| 22/05/10 | Fiji Barbarians | 19 – 14 | Savaii Samoa | Lawaqa Park, Sigatoka |
| 2:00pm |

| 22/05/10 | Tau'uta Reds | 0 – 48 | Fiji Warriors | Lawaqa Park, Sigatoka |
| 5:00pm |

== Final ==
| 29/05/10 | Fiji Warriors | 26 – 17 | Fiji Barbarians | National Stadium, Suva |
| 3:00pm |
