= 2009 Pacific Rugby Cup =

Rugby union tournament

- Countries: Fiji (2 teams); Samoa (2 teams); Tonga (2 teams)
- Champions: Fiji Warriors
- Matches played: 16

The IRB Pacific Rugby Cup 2009 was the fourth edition of the Pacific Rugby Cup competition. First held in 2006, the 2009 edition, like its predecessors, featured 6 representative rugby union football teams; 2 from each of the three Pacific rugby unions - Fiji, Samoa and Tonga.

Fiji Warriors won the championship, defeating Upolu Samoa in the final.

== Teams and format ==
The 6 participating teams were:

- Upolu Samoa and Savaii Samoa from Samoa
- Fiji Warriors and Fiji Barbarians from Fiji
- Tau'uta Reds and Tautahi Gold from Tonga

The teams played a single round robin (home or away) series. The two top teams in the final standings met in the grand final match, with the first ranking team awarded home advantage.

== Stadiums ==
| Team | Stadium |
|---|---|
| Fiji Barbarians | Churchill Park, Lautoka; Lawaqa Park, Sigatoka |
| Fiji Warriors | Churchill Park, Lautoka; Lawaqa Park, Sigatoka |
| Savai'i Samoa | Apia Park, Apia; Prince Edward Park, Iva |
| Tautahi Gold | Teufaiva Stadium, Nukuʻalofa |
| Tau'uta Reds | Teufaiva Stadium, Nukuʻalofa |
| Upolu Samoa | Apia Park, Apia |

== Table ==
| Team | Played | Won | Drawn | Lost | For | Against | Point Difference | Bonus Points | Points |
|---|---|---|---|---|---|---|---|---|---|
| Upolu Samoa | 5 | 4 | 0 | 1 | 114 | 84 | +30 | 1 | 17 |
| Fiji Warriors | 5 | 3 | 0 | 2 | 168 | 89 | +79 | 5 | 17 |
| Savaii Samoa | 5 | 3 | 0 | 2 | 103 | 91 | +12 | 3 | 15 |
| Tautahi Gold | 5 | 3 | 0 | 2 | 110 | 78 | +32 | 3 | 15 |
| Tau'uta Reds | 5 | 1 | 0 | 4 | 62 | 113 | -51 | 2 | 6 |
| Fiji Barbarians | 5 | 1 | 0 | 4 | 74 | 191 | -117 | 1 | 5 |
Source: oceaniarugby.com

Competition rules
Points breakdown:
4 points for a win
2 points for a draw
1 bonus point for a loss by seven points or less
1 bonus point for scoring four or more tries in a match
Classification:
Teams standings are calculated as follows:
Most log points accumulated from all matches
Most log points accumulated in matches between tied teams
Highest difference between points scored for and against accumulated from all matches
Most points scored accumulated from all matches

== Match results ==
Round One

| 2009-04-24 | Savai'i Samoa | 14-15 | Tau'uta Reds | Apia Park, Apia |

| 2009-04-24 | Fiji Barbarians | 8-47 | Fiji Warriors | Lawaqa Park, Sigatoka |

| 2009-04-25 | Tautahi Gold | 9-17 | Upolu Samoa | Teufaiva Stadium, Nukuʻalofa |

Round Two

| 2009-05-01 | Upolu Samoa | 19-15 | Tau'uta Reds | Apia Park, Apia |

| 2009-05-01 | Fiji Barbarians | 17-23 | Savai'i Samoa | Churchill Park, Lautoka |

| 2009-05-02 | Tautahi Gold | 26-21 | Fiji Warriors | Teufaiva Stadium, Nukuʻalofa |

Round Three

| 2009-05-08 | Upolu Samoa | 49-13 | Fiji Barbarians | Apia Park, Apia |

| 2009-05-09 | Fiji Warriors | 39-22 | Savai'i Samoa | Lawaqa Park, Sigatoka |

| 2009-05-09 | Tautahi Gold | 14-12 | Tau'uta Reds | Teufaiva Stadium, Nukuʻalofa |

Round Four

| 2009-05-15 | Fiji Warriors | 21-23 | Upolu Samoa | Churchill Park, Lautoka |

| 2009-05-16 | Tau'uta Reds | 15-26 | Fiji Barbarians | Teufaiva Stadium, Nukuʻalofa |

| 2009-05-16 | Savai'i Samoa | 18-14 | Tautahi Gold | Prince Edward Park, Iva |

Round Five

| 2009-05-22 | Savai'i Samoa | 26 - 6 | Upolu Samoa | Apia Park, Apia |

| 2009-05-22 | Fiji Barbarians | 10-47 | Tautahi Gold | Lawaqa Park, Sigatoka |

| 2009-05-23 | Tau'uta Reds | 15-40 | Fiji Warriors | Teufaiva Stadium, Nukuʻalofa |

== Final ==
| May 30, 2009 | Upolu Samoa | 7-19 | Fiji Warriors | Apia Park, Apia |
