= 2007 Pacific Rugby Cup =

Rugby union tournament

- Countries: Fiji (2 teams); Samoa (2 teams); Tonga (2 teams)
- Champions: Upolu Samoa
- Matches played: 16

Upolu Samoa after winning the 2007 Pacific Rugby Cup

The 2007 Pacific Rugby Cup was the second edition of the Pacific Rugby Cup competition and featured 6 representative rugby union football teams; 2 from each of the three Pacific rugby unions – Fiji, Samoa, and Tonga. It was played from 31 March to 5 May. In the grand final match, Upolu Samoa was victorious on Tongan soil, beating the Tau'uta Reds in the decider by 20 points (35 to 15).

In the grand final match, Upolu Samoa was victorious on Tongan soil, beating the Tau'uta Reds in the decider by 20 points (35 to 15).

== Teams and format ==
The six teams that were created for the inaugural 2006 competition returned to compete in 2007. These teams were:

- Savaii Samoa
- Upolu Samoa
- Fiji Warriors
- Fiji Barbarians
- Tau'uta Reds
- Tautahi Gold

The teams played a single round robin (home or away) series. The two top-ranked teams at the end of the standings met in the grand final match, with the first-ranked team awarded home advantage.

== Table ==
Team	Played	Won	Drawn	Lost	For	Against	Point Difference	Bonus Points	Points
Tau'uta Reds	5	4	0	1	108	102	+6	1	17
Upolu Samoa	5	3	0	2	112	114	-2	3	15
Fiji Barbarians	5	2	0	3	97	108	-11	4	12
Savaii Samoa	5	2	0	3	106	88	18	3	11
Fiji Warriors	5	2	0	3	93	90	+3	1	11
Tautahi Gold	5	2	0	3	84	98	-14	1	9

== Final ==
5 May 2007	Tau'uta Reds	15–35	Upolu Samoa	Teufaiva Stadium, Nukuʻalofa Att:3,000

== See also ==
- Pacific Rugby Cup
