= World Rugby Pacific Challenge =

Annual rugby union football tournament

- Current season or competition: 2024 World Rugby Pacific Challenge
- Sport: Rugby union football
- Instituted: 2006
- Number of teams: 4
- Country: Fiji; Japan; Samoa; Tonga
- Holders: Fiji Warriors (2023)
- Most titles: Fiji Warriors (10 titles)
- Related competition: Pacific Nations Cup

The World Rugby Pacific Challenge, formerly the IRB Pacific Rugby Cup, is an annual rugby union football tournament held in Oceania since 2006. It is contested by national 'A' teams (formed from the best locally based players, with most not already on their nations' senior rugby team) from the Asia-Pacific region. The tournament is run by World Rugby (previously IRB) through Oceania Rugby.

The Fiji Warriors (in white) taking on 2006 champions Savaii Samoa (navy blue) in 2007

The original IRB Pacific Rugby Cup featured two teams from each of the three Pacific Island countries of Fiji, Samoa and Tonga. The competition followed the completion of Fiji's Colonial Cup, Samoa's National Provincial Championship and Tonga's Provincial Championship and provided player development pathway leading into the IRB Pacific Nations Cup.

Since 2011, the tournament has been contested by national 'A' sides, although some matches also featured teams from Super Rugby academies in Australia and New Zealand. Teams from Japan, Argentina and Canada have also joined the tournament to compete with the three Pacific Island countries.

== Teams ==
The competing national 'A' teams as of the 2018 season were:

- Fiji Warriors
- Junior Japan
- Samoa A
- Tonga A

== Overall ==
Summary of all Pacific Challenge winners and runners-up, for tournaments up to and including 2020:

=== By team ===
Team	Tournament wins	Runner-up placings	Seasons contested
Fiji Warriors	10	3	16
(Argentina) Pampas XV	2	0	2
Upolu Samoa	1	2	5
(Tonga) Tautahi Gold	1	0	5
Savaii Samoa	1	0	5
Samoa A	0	5	11
Junior Japan	1	3	9
(Tonga) Tau'uta Reds	0	1	6
Fiji Barbarians	0	1	5
(Australia) Qld Reds A	0	1	1
Total	16	16	16

=== By country ===
Country	Tournament wins	Runner-up placings	Seasons contested
Fiji	10	4	16
Samoa	2	7	16
Argentina	2	0	2
Japan	1	3	9
Tonga	1	1	16
Australia	0	1	1
Total	16	16	16

== History ==
=== Pacific Island tournament: 2006 to 2010 ===
Logo 2006–2014

The Pacific Rugby Cup initially featured six representative teams, two from each Pacific Island country:

Fijian teams:
- Fiji Warriors
- Fiji Barbarians
Samoan teams:
- Upolu Samoa
- Savaii Samoa
Tongan teams:
- Tau'uta Reds
- Tautahi Gold

The format was a single round-robin tournament with the top-placed team hosting a final against the second-placed to decide the title. The Fiji Warriors won the competition twice, the Samoan teams won the Cup once each, and Tautahi Gold also claimed the title once for Tonga.

=== Pacific Australasian series: 2011 to 2014 ===
From 2011, the three Pacific Island countries were represented by their national 'A' teams. They were joined by Japan's national 'A' team, Junior Japan, as the fourth core team in 2013. The itinerary included tour matches against Super Rugby academy opposition from Australia and New Zealand and included the following sides:^{[A]}^{[B]}

Pacific Cup teams:
- Fiji Warriors
- Samoa A
- Tonga A
- Junior Japan
Australian teams:
- ACT A
- NSW A
- Reds A
- Force A
- Rebel Rising
- Brisbane Academy
- Sydney Academy
New Zealand teams:
- Chiefs Dev XV
- Crusaders Knights
- Hurricanes Dev XV
- Blues Dev XV
- Highlanders Dev XV

The tournament was split into three stages with the core Pacific Cup teams playing Super Rugby academies in the first two stages in Australia and New Zealand, respectively. In the third stage, the Pacific Cup teams played each other in a single round robin, home or away, to decide the title.^{[C]} No finals were played and the team finishing on top of the combined table after all stages was the tournament winner. The Fiji Warriors won all three tournaments from 2011 to 2013.

The format was expanded again in 2014 with Argentina's Pampas XV and four Australian academy teams joining the competition as core teams competing with the Pacific A sides. The New Zealand development teams did not participate in 2014 and the tournament was held entirely in Australia. Two pools were formed as follows:

Pool A:
Pool B:
- Fiji Warriors
- Force A
- Reds A
- Junior Japan
- ACT A
- NSW Gen Blue
- Pampas XV
- Samoa A
- Tonga A

A single round robin was played in each pool with the top ranked sides from each playing in the final. The Pampas XV defeated Reds A in the final held in Sydney to win the title. Fiji Warriors defeated Samoa A in the play-off for third place.

=== Pacific Challenge: 2015 onward ===
The Pacific Rugby Cup was restyled as the "Pacific Challenge" in 2015 and held in Fiji. It returned to a being a tournament solely for national 'A' teams, with Canada A replacing the Australian academy teams.

The Pampas XV won again in 2015 but were replaced by Junior Japan for the following season. The Fiji Warriors won the next four tournaments at home before their dominance was broken by Junior Japan defeating them at Suva to take the 2020 Pacific Challenge title.

After a two-year hiatus due to the COVID-19 pandemic, the tournament returned to Apia Park, Samoa in 2023.

Notes

^{A} Japan A, Force A, Rebel Rising, and the Brisbane and Sydney Academies joined in 2013.
^{B} The Blues and Highlanders development teams featured in 2012 and 2013.
^{C} The Pacific stage was cancelled in 2013 to allow Fiji, Samoa and Tonga to maximise preparations for the end-of-year tours.

== Winners ==
Year	# of Teams	Final			Venue
Year	# of Teams	Winner	Score	Runner-up	Venue
2006	6	Savaii Samoa	10–5	Fiji Warriors	Marist Grounds, Apia
2007	6	Upolu Samoa	35–15	(Tonga) Tau'uta Reds	Teufaiva Stadium, Nukuʻalofa
2008	6	(Tonga) Tautahi Gold	11–3	Upolu Samoa	Apia Park, Apia
2009	6	Fiji Warriors	19–7	Upolu Samoa	Apia Park, Apia
2010	6	Fiji Warriors	26–17	Fiji Barbarians	National Stadium, Suva
2011	3	Fiji Warriors	round robin	Samoa A	various
2012	3	Fiji Warriors	round robin	Samoa A	various
2013	4	Fiji Warriors	round robin	Samoa A	various
2014	9	(Argentina) Pampas XV	36–21	(Australia) Queensland A	TG Millner Field, Sydney
2015	6	(Argentina) Pampas XV	17–9	Fiji Warriors	National Stadium, Suva
2016	4	Fiji Warriors	36–0	Samoa A	National Stadium, Suva
2017	4	Fiji Warriors	round robin	Junior Japan	National Stadium, Suva
2018	4	Fiji Warriors	round robin	Junior Japan	National Stadium, Suva
2019	4	Fiji Warriors	round robin	Junior Japan	National Stadium, Suva
2020	4	Junior Japan	round robin	Fiji Warriors	National Stadium, Suva
Not contested 2021–2022
2023	4	Fiji Warriors	round robin	Samoa A	Apia Park, Apia
2024	4	Junior Japan	round robin	Fiji Warriors	Apia Park, Apia

== Tournaments ==
Teams listed are those that qualified for the Pacific Rugby Cup final matches (for seasons without a final, the core teams are shown). Results of the final matches are written so that the score of the team in each row is mentioned first.

Legend
	Pacific Rugby Cup winner.	Pos = Log Position, P = Games Played, W = Games Won, D = Games Drawn, L = Games Lost, PF = Points For, PA = Points Against, Diff = Points Difference, TB = Try Bonus Points, LB = Losing Bonus Points, BP = Bonus Points, Pts = Log Points, Refs = References
†	Grand Final winner.	Pos = Log Position, P = Games Played, W = Games Won, D = Games Drawn, L = Games Lost, PF = Points For, PA = Points Against, Diff = Points Difference, TB = Try Bonus Points, LB = Losing Bonus Points, BP = Bonus Points, Pts = Log Points, Refs = References

=== Pacific Challenge: 2015 to 2020 ===
Contested by the national 'A' teams of Fiji, Japan, Samoa, and Tonga. Canada A along with Argentina's Pampas XV also competed in 2015.

Pacific Rugby Challenge winner and runner-up
Year	Duration	Pos	Team	Pool matches										Play-offs	Refs
Year	Duration	Pos	Team	Pld	W	D	L	F	A	Diff	TB	LB	Pts	Final	Refs
2020	6 March to 14 March	1	Junior Japan	3	3	0	0	143	25	+118	2	0	14	–	
2020	6 March to 14 March	2	Fiji Warriors	3	2	0	1	88	26	+62	2	0	10	–	
2019	8 March to 16 March	1	Fiji Warriors	3	3	0	0	170	54	+116	3	0	15	–	
2019	8 March to 16 March	2	Junior Japan	3	2	0	1	94	97	−3	3	0	11	–	
2018	9 March to 17 March	1	Fiji Warriors	3	3	0	0	118	31	+87	3	0	15	–	
2018	9 March to 17 March	2	Junior Japan	3	2	0	1	77	77	0	2	0	10	–	
2017	10 March to 18 March	1	Fiji Warriors	3	3	0	0	125	71	+54	2	0	15	–	
2017	10 March to 18 March	2	Junior Japan	3	2	0	1	92	103	−11	2	0	10	–	
2016	8 March to 21 March	1	Fiji Warriors†	3	3	0	0	134	34	+100	3	0	15	36–0	
2016	8 March to 21 March	2	Samoa A	3	2	0	1	98	56	+42	2	0	10	0–36	
2015	10 March to 23 March	1A	Pampas XV†	3	3	0	0	89	42	+47	2	0	14	17–9	
2015	10 March to 23 March	1B	Fiji Warriors	3	2	0	1	145	42	+103	2	1	11	9–17	

Competition rules
Points breakdown:
4 points for a win
2 points for a draw
1 bonus point for a loss by seven points or less
1 bonus point for scoring four or more tries in a match
Classification:
Teams standings are calculated as follows:
Most log points accumulated from all matches
Most log points accumulated in matches between tied teams
Highest difference between points scored for and against accumulated from all matches
Most points scored accumulated from all matches

=== Pacific Australasian series: 2011 to 2014 ===
Contested by the national 'A' teams of Fiji, Samoa, and Tonga. Japan A joined as a core team in 2013. The core teams played against Super Rugby academy opposition from Australia and New Zealand before meeting each other in a single round robin to decide the title. No finals were played and team finishing on top of the table after all matches were completed was the tournament winner.

In 2014, Argentina's Pampas XV and four Australian Academy sides were added as core teams. Two pools were formed and a single round robin played in each. The top ranked sides in each pool played off in the final for the title and the second ranked teams played off for third place.

2011–2014 Pacific Rugby Cup finalists. (Note: No finals were played from 2011 to 2013. The team finishing on top of the table after all matches were completed was the tournament winner.)
Year	Duration	Pos	Team	Pool matches										Play-offs	Refs
Year	Duration	Pos	Team	Pld	W	D	L	F	A	Diff	TB	LB	Pts	Final	Refs
2014	21 February to 23 March	1B	Pampas XV†	4	4	0	0	148	83	65	3	0	19	36–21	
2014	21 February to 23 March	1A	Reds A	3	2	0	1	126	55	71	2	1	11	21–36	
2014	21 February to 23 March	2A	Fiji Warriors	3	2	0	1	154	59	95	2	1	11	54–21 (Note: Play-off for third place.)	
2014	21 February to 23 March	2B	Tonga A	4	2	0	2	96	115	-19	1	0	9	21–54	
2013	1 March to 7 April	1	Fiji Warriors	6	2	2	2	118	155	-37	2	0	14	–	
2013	1 March to 7 April	2	Samoa A	6	2	0	4	134	198	-64	1	1	10	–	
2013	1 March to 7 April	3	Junior Japan	6	0	0	6	140	361	-221	3	0	3	–	
2013	1 March to 7 April	4	Tonga A	6	0	0	6	73	306	-233	0	0	0	–	
2012	24 February to 19 October	1	Fiji Warriors	8	7	0	1	205	165	40	3	0	31	–	
2012	24 February to 19 October	2	Samoa A	8	3	0	5	191	238	-47	0	1	13	–	
2012	24 February to 19 October	3	Tonga A	8	1	1	6	72	253	-181	0	0	6	–	
2011	19 February to 26 March	1	Fiji Warriors	8	4	0	4	144	201	-57	0	1	17	–	
2011	19 February to 26 March	2	Samoa A	8	3	0	5	135	171	-36	1	2	15	–	
2011	19 February to 26 March	3	Tonga A	8	2	1	5	133	233	-100	0	1	11	–	

Competition rules
Points breakdown:
4 points for a win
2 points for a draw
1 bonus point for a loss by seven points or less
1 bonus point for scoring four or more tries in a match
Classification:
Teams standings are calculated as follows:
Most log points accumulated from all matches
Most log points accumulated in matches between tied teams
Highest difference between points scored for and against accumulated from all matches
Most points scored accumulated from all matches

Upolu Samoa after winning the 2007 Pacific Rugby Cup.

=== Pacific Island tournament: 2006 to 2010 ===
For the first five seasons, the tournament was contested by six teams; two each from Fiji, Samoa, and Tonga. The format consisted of a single round-robin, home or away, and the teams finishing in the first two positions on the table played in a final, hosted by the top ranked team, to decide the Pacific Rugby Cup title.

2006–2010 Pacific Rugby Cup finalists.
Year	Duration	Pos	Team	Pool matches									Play-offs	Refs
Year	Duration	Pos	Team	Pld	W	D	L	PF	PA	Diff	BP	Pts	Final	Refs
2010	5 May to 29 May	1	Fiji Warriors†	5	4	0	1	155	73	82	3	19	26–17	
2010	5 May to 29 May	2	Fiji Barbarians	5	4	0	1	145	116	29	3	19	17–26	
2009	24 April to 29 May	1	Upolu Samoa	5	4	0	1	114	84	30	1	17	7–19	
2009	24 April to 29 May	2	Fiji Warriors†	5	3	0	2	168	89	79	5	17	19–7	
2008	18 April to 24 May	1	Upolu Samoa	5	4	0	1	90	49	41	1	17	3–11	
2008	18 April to 24 May	2	Tautahi Gold†	5	3	0	2	97	75	22	1	13	11–3	
2007	31 March to 5 May	1	Tau'uta Reds	5	4	0	1	108	102	6	1	17	15–35	
2007	31 March to 5 May	2	Upolu Samoa†	5	3	0	2	112	114	−2	3	15	35–15	
2006	15 April to 20 May	1	Savaii Samoa†	5	4	0	1	120	81	39	2	18	10–5	
2006	15 April to 20 May	2	Fiji Warriors	5	3	1	1	112	72	40	2	17	5–10	

Competition rules
Points breakdown:
4 points for a win
2 points for a draw
1 bonus point for a loss by seven points or less
1 bonus point for scoring four or more tries in a match
Classification:
Teams standings are calculated as follows:
Most log points accumulated from all matches
Most log points accumulated in matches between tied teams
Highest difference between points scored for and against accumulated from all matches
Most points scored accumulated from all matches

2006–2010 Overall pool match results.
Team	Played	Won	Drawn	Lost	For	Against	Diff	BP	Points
Fiji Warriors	25	13	1	11	598	428	170	14	68
Savaii Samoa	25	14	0	11	521	451	70	11	67
Upolu Samoa	25	13	1	11	491	482	9	9	63
Tau'uta Reds	25	12	1	12	455	438	17	8	58
Fiji Barbarians	25	11	1	13	464	592	−128	12	58
Tautahi Gold	25	10	0	15	425	568	−143	7	47

== See also ==
- Pacific Nations Cup
