= 2006 Pacific Rugby Cup =

Rugby union tournament

- Countries: Fiji (2 teams); Samoa (2 teams); Tonga (2 teams)
- Champions: Savaii Samoa
- Matches played: 16

The 2006 champions Savaii Samoa (in blue) took on the Fiji Warriors in the Pacific Rugby Cup (2007).

The 2006 Pacific Rugby Cup was the inaugural season of the Pacific Rugby Cup. It featured 6 representative rugby union football teams; 2 from each of the three Pacific rugby unions - Fiji, Samoa, and Tonga.

Savaii Samoa won the title, defeating Fiji Warriors by 10 points to 5 in the grand final.

== Teams and format ==
The six teams that were created to take part in the competition were:

- Savaii Samoa
- Upolu Samoa
- Fiji Warriors
- Fiji Barbarians
- Tau'uta Reds
- Tautahi Gold

The teams played a single round-robin (home or away) series. The two top-ranked teams at the end of the standings met in the grand final match, with the first-ranked team awarded home advantage.

== Table ==
Team	Played	Won	Drawn	Lost	For	Against	Point Difference	Bonus Points	Points
Savaii Samoa	5	4	0	1	120	81	+39	2	18
Fiji Warriors	5	3	1	1	112	72	+40	2	17
Fiji Barbarians	5	2	1	2	76	73	+3	2	12
Tau'uta Reds	5	2	0	3	70	89	-19	2	10
Upolu Samoa	5	1	1	3	81	113	-32	1	7
Tautahi Gold	5	1	1	3	62	94	-32	1	7

== Match results ==
2006-04-15
2006-04-15	Fiji Warriors	22–14	Fiji Barbarians	Ratu Cakobau Park, Nausori Att:2,000

Upolu Samoa	18–20	Tautahi Gold	Marist Grounds, Apia Att:2,000

Tau'uta Reds	13–18	Savaii Samoa	Teufaiva Sport Stadium, Nukuʻalofa Att:3,000

2006-04-22
2006-04-22	Tautahi Gold	13–26	Savaii Samoa	Teufaiva Sport Stadium, Nukuʻalofa Att:4,000

Upolu Samoa	8–8	Fiji Warriors	Marist Grounds, Apia Att:2,000

Fiji Barbarians	17–14	Tau'uta Reds	Prince Charles Park, Nadi Att:1,000

2006-04-29
2006-04-29	Fiji Warriors	32–16	Tautahi Gold	Ratu Cakobau Park, Nausori Att:2,000

Savaii Samoa	13–14	Fiji Barbarians	Marist Grounds, Apia Att:2,000

Tau'uta Reds	19–20	Upolu Samoa	Teufaiva Sport Stadium, Nukuʻalofa Att:3,000

2006-05-06
2006-05-06	Savaii Samoa	27–21	Fiji Warriors	Marist Grounds, Apia Att:1,000

Fiji Barbarians	30–15	Upolu Samoa	Prince Charles Park, Nadi Att:2,000

Tau'uta Reds	13–8	Tautahi Gold	Teufaiva Sport Stadium, Nukuʻalofa Att:3,000

2006-05-13
2006-05-13	Fiji Warriors	29–8	Tau'uta Reds	Lawaqa Park, Sigatoka Att:2,500

Savaii Samoa	36–20	Upolu Samoa	Marist Grounds, Apia

Tautahi Gold	5–5	Fiji Barbarians	Teufaiva Sport Stadium, Nukuʻalofa

== Final ==
2006-05-20
2006-05-20	Savaii Samoa	10–5	Fiji Warriors	Marist Grounds, Apia Att:2,500
