= Rugby football =

Rugby union and rugby league team sports

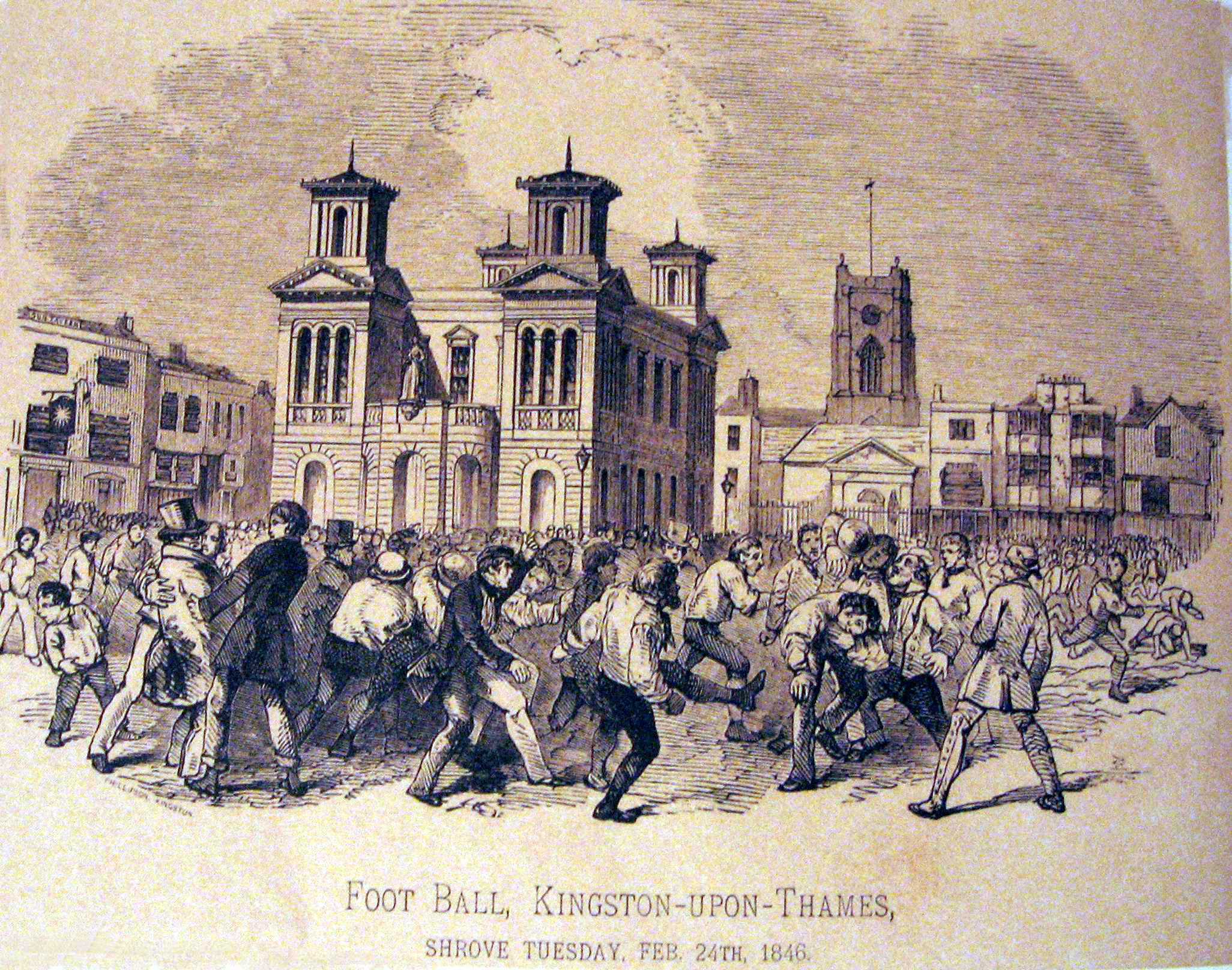
Football match in Kingston upon Thames, England on 24 February 1846

Rugby football, also known simply as rugby, is a type of football, a team sport which developed in the nineteenth century in the United Kingdom, and which later split into the modern sports of rugby union and rugby league.

Rugby football started at Rugby School in Rugby, Warwickshire, England, where the rules were first put down in written (codified) form in 1845. The School's students had been playing football, with limited ball-handling allowed, since at least the early 1820s. Forms of football in which the ball was carried and tossed date to the Middle Ages (see medieval football). Rugby football spread to other English public schools in the 19th century and across the British Empire as former pupils continued to play it.

Rugby football split into two codes in 1895, when twenty-one clubs from the North of England left the Rugby Football Union to form the Northern Rugby Football Union (renamed the Rugby Football League in 1922) at the George Hotel, Huddersfield, over payments to players who took time off work to play ("broken-time payments"), thus making rugby league the first football code to turn professional and pay players. Rugby union allowed professional players one hundred years later, in 1995. The world governing bodies are World Rugby (rugby union) and the International Rugby League (rugby league).

Canadian football and American football were once considered forms of rugby football but, after significant rules changes, are not now. The governing body of Canadian football, Football Canada, was known as the Canadian Rugby Union as late as 1967, more than fifty years after the sport parted ways with rugby rules.The first rules of the Melbourne Football Club in 1859 (now Australian rules football) were devised from the footballers' experiences playing rugby football the previous winter.

== Forms ==
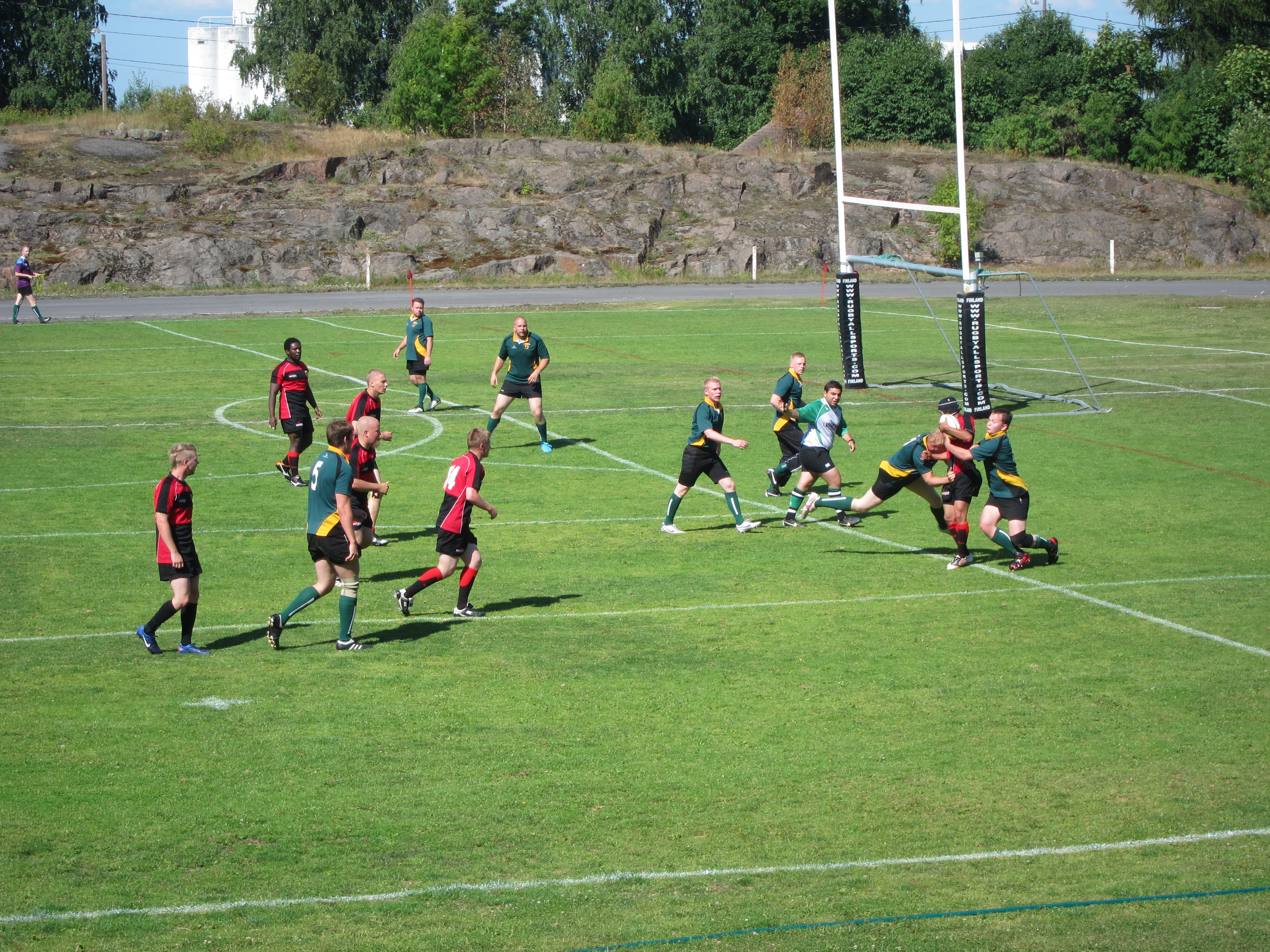
Griffins RFC Kotka, the rugby union team from Kotka, Finland, playing in the Rugby-7 Tournament in 2013

Following the 1895 split in rugby football, the two forms rugby league and rugby union differed in administration only. Soon the desire among the northern clubs to make the rules simpler and more attractive to paying spectators meant that the rules of rugby league were modified, including reducing teams from 15 to 13 players, removing the line-out and replacing the ruck with the play-the-ball, resulting in two distinct sports.

The form of rugby played at the Olympic Games is rugby sevens, based on rugby union, and organised by World Rugby. Each team has seven players on the field at one time, playing seven-minute halves. The rules and pitch size are the same as rugby union. Rugby league sevens and nines are similar short forms of rugby league.

=== Global expansion and professional era ===
Rugby football, in both its union and league forms, has expanded significantly beyond its origins in the United Kingdom and is now played worldwide. Rugby union has experienced substantial global growth through international competitions such as the Rugby World Cup, while rugby league has developed strong regional followings in countries including Australia, England, and Papua New Guinea.

The professionalisation of rugby union in 1995 marked a major turning point in the sport's development, leading to increased investment, global broadcasting, and the expansion of professional leagues across Europe and the Southern Hemisphere.

== History ==
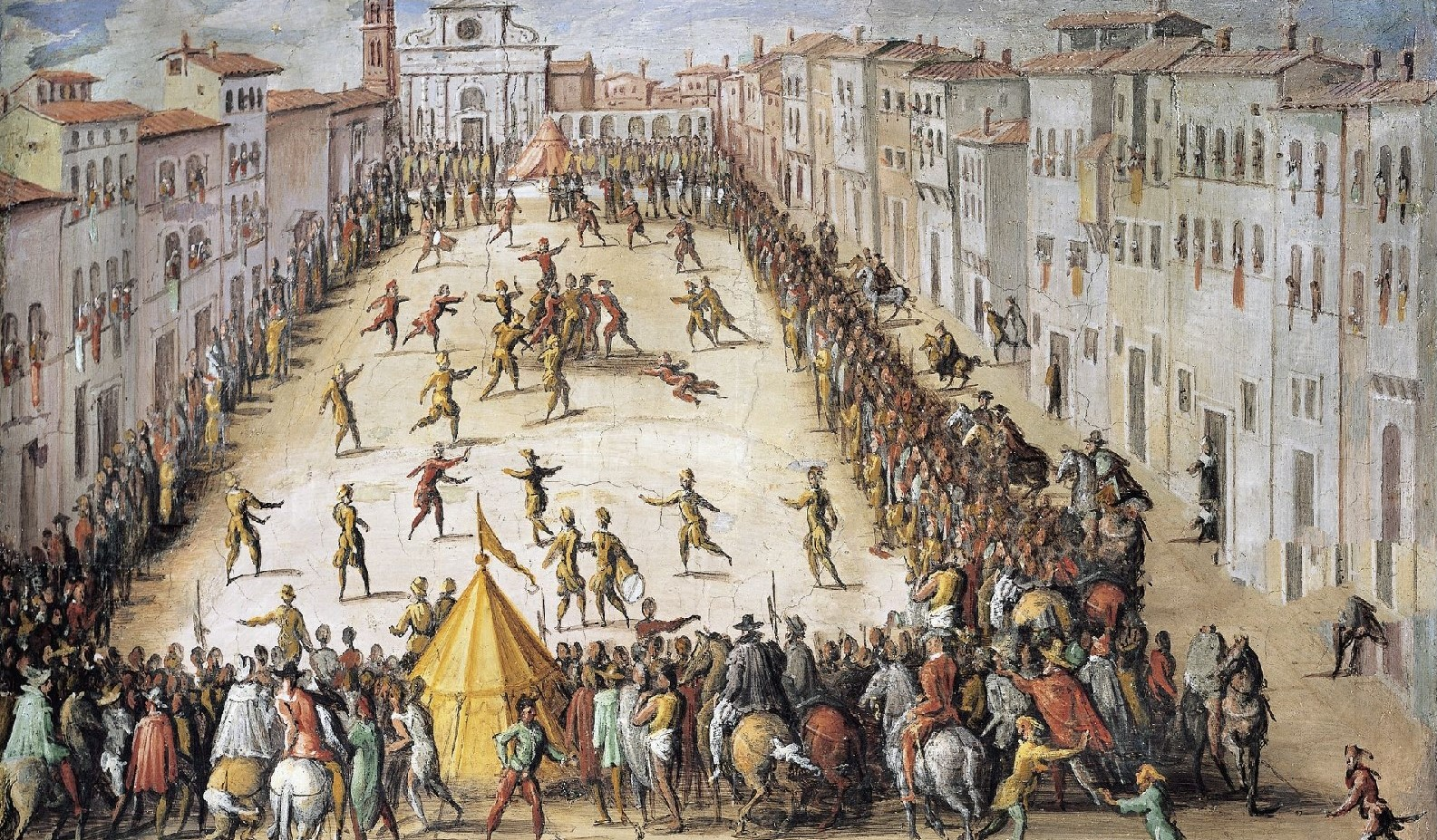
Calcio Fiorentino match in Piazza Santa Maria Novella in Florence, Italy, painted by Jan Van der Straet

=== Establishment of modern rugby ===
In 1871, English clubs met to form the Rugby Football Union (RFU). In 1892, after charges of professionalism (compensation of team members) were made against some clubs for paying players for missing work, the Northern Rugby Football Union, usually called the Northern Union (NU), was formed. The existing rugby union authorities responded by issuing sanctions against the clubs, players, and officials involved in the new organization. After the schism, the separate clubs were named "rugby league" and "rugby union".

Early forms of rugby

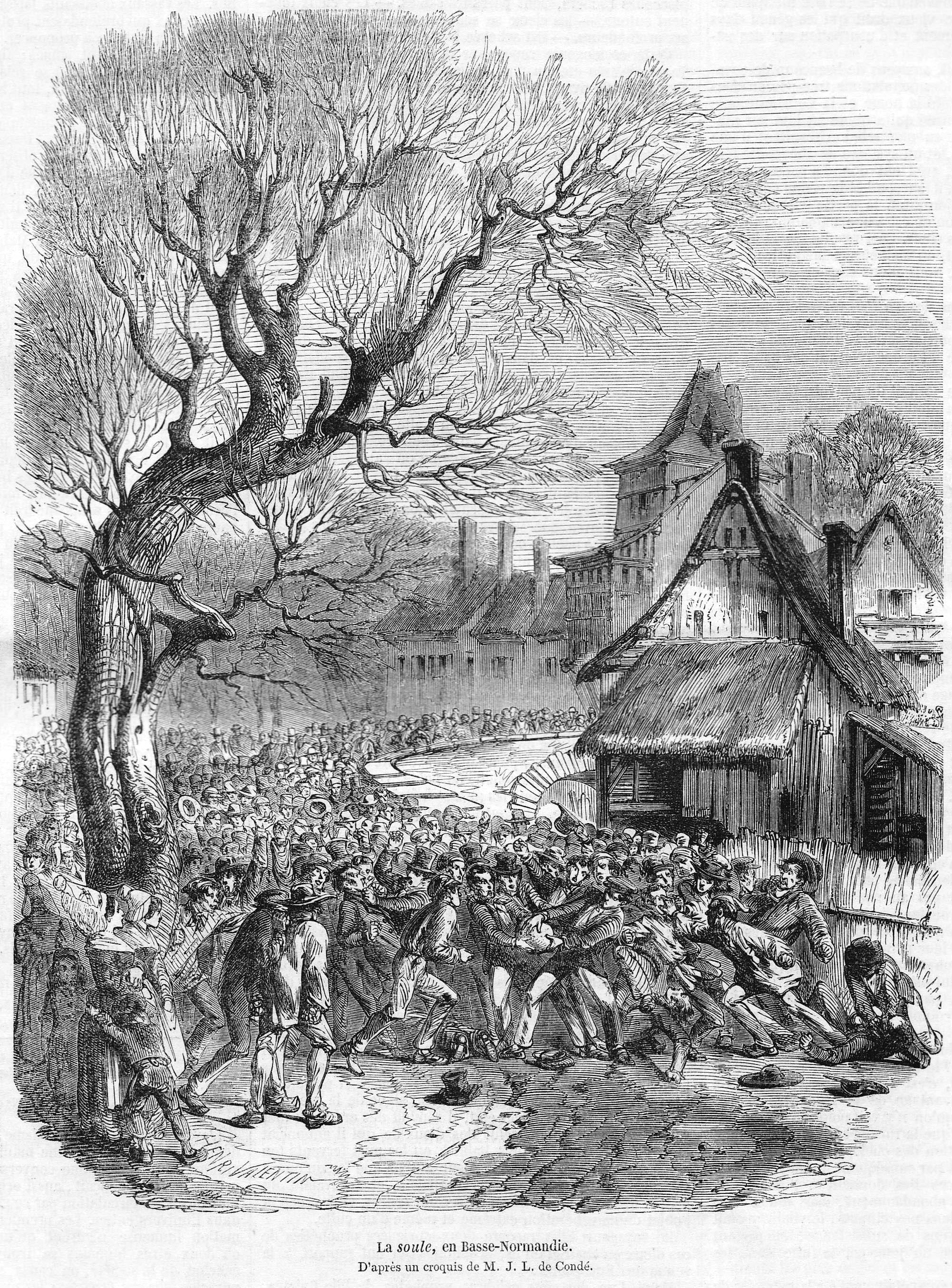
A scrummage in a La soule game in Basse Normandie, France, 1852

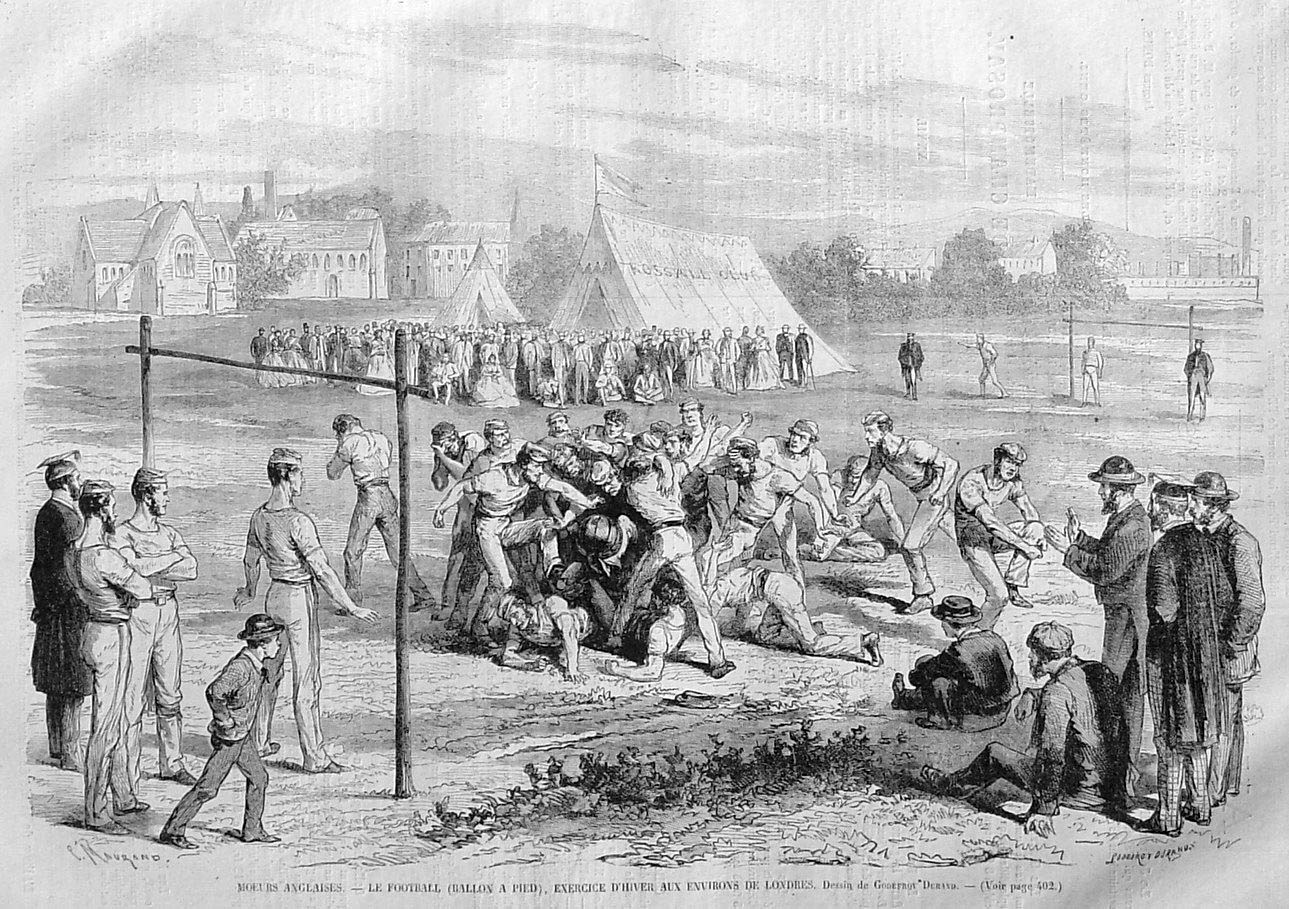
Depiction of a "football" game in London, 1868. Illustration by Godefroy Durand.

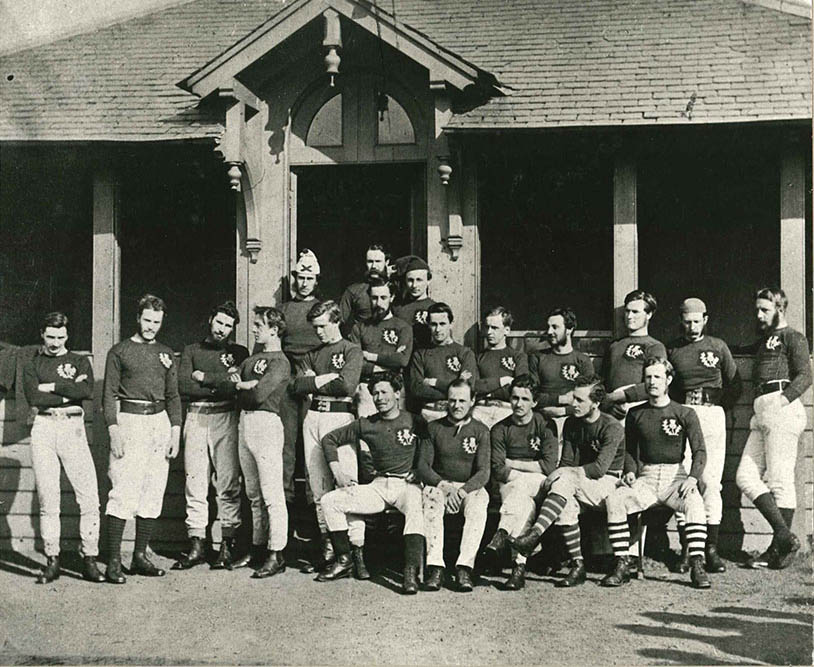
Scotland first rugby team (wearing brown) for the 1st international, v. England in Edinburgh, 1871

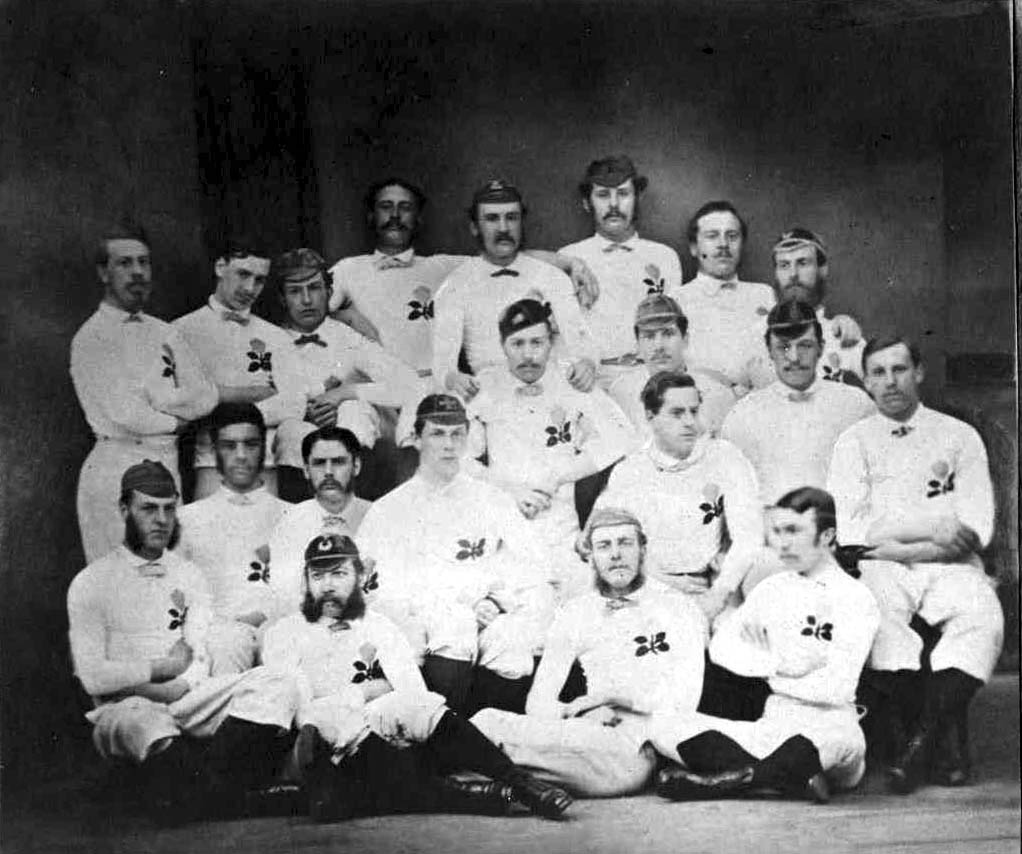
The England team in the 1st international, v. Scotland in Edinburgh, 1871

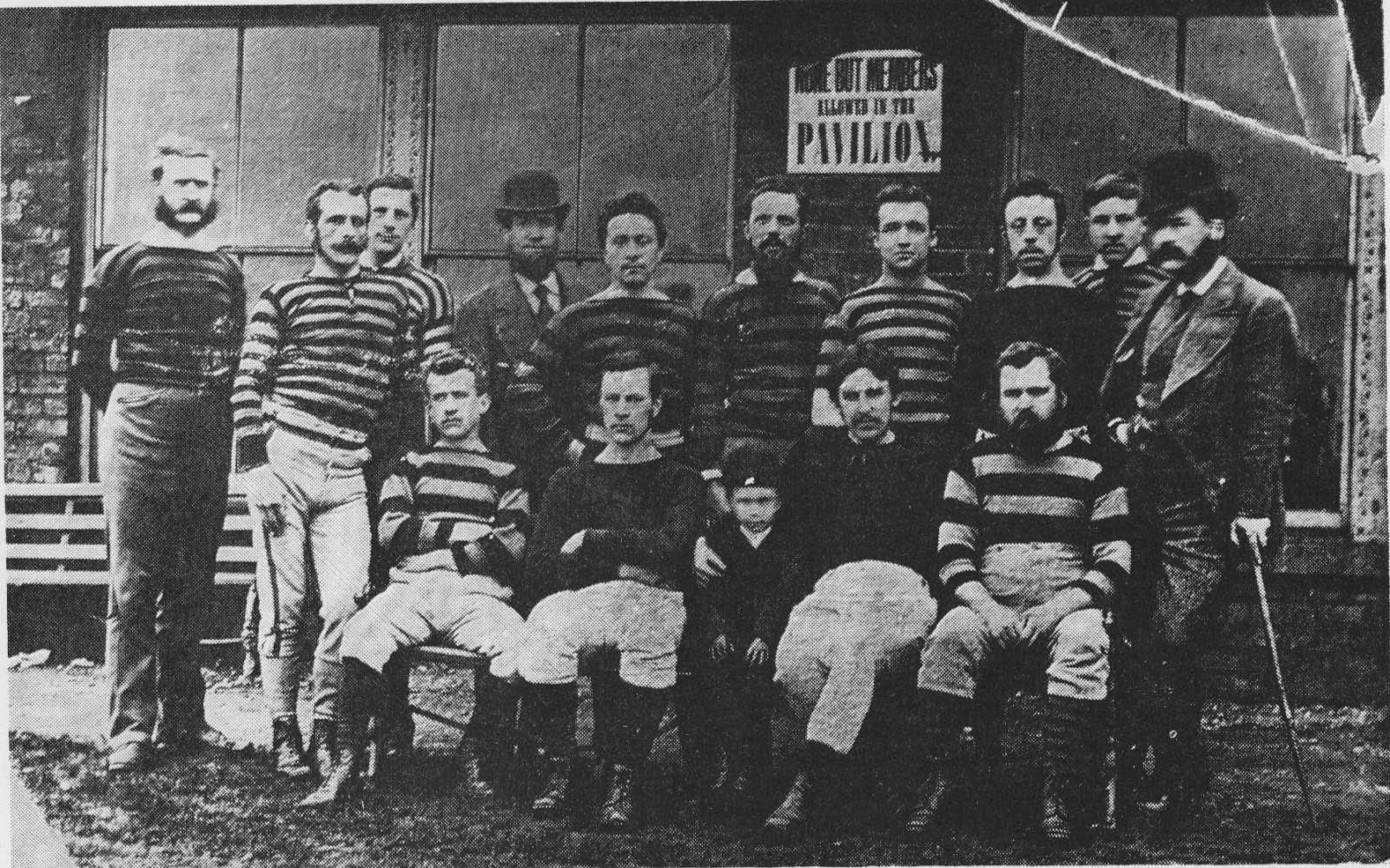
Rochdale Hornets team of 1875

== Global status of rugby codes ==
=== Rugby union ===
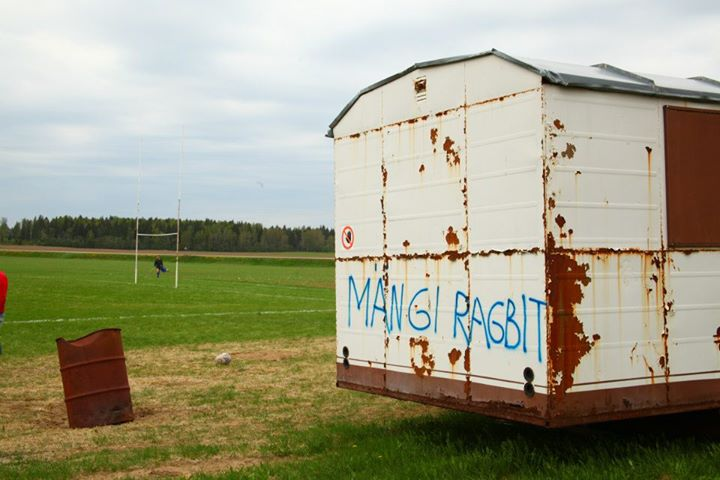
Rugby field in Tapa Parish, Estonia

Rugby union is both a professional and amateur game, and is dominated by the first tier unions: England, New Zealand, Ireland, Wales, South Africa, Australia, Argentina, Scotland, Italy, France and Japan. Second and third tier unions include Belgium, Brazil, Canada, Chile, Fiji, Georgia, Germany, Hong Kong, Kenya, Namibia, the Netherlands, Portugal, Romania, Russia, Samoa, Spain, Tonga, the United States, Uruguay and Zimbabwe. Rugby Union is administered by World Rugby (WR), whose headquarters are located in Dublin, Ireland. It is the national sport in New Zealand, Fiji, Samoa, Tonga, Georgia, Wales and Madagascar, and is by far the most popular form of rugby globally. The Olympic Games have admitted the seven-a-side version of the game, known as Rugby sevens, into the programme from Rio de Janeiro in 2016 onwards.

The premier international competition is the Rugby World Cup. There are major domestic professional leagues in several countries.

=== Rugby league ===
Rugby league is also both a professional and amateur game, administered on a global level by International Rugby League. In addition to amateur and semi-professional competitions in the United States, Russia, Lebanon, Serbia, Europe and Oceania, there are two major professional competitions; the National Rugby League based in Australia, New Zealand and Papua New Guinea, and the Super League, with teams from England and France. International Rugby League is dominated by Australia, England and New Zealand, though Tonga and Samoa have regularly disrupted this hegemony since 2017. In Papua New Guinea, it is the national sport. Other nations from the South Pacific and Europe also play in the Pacific Cup and European Cup respectively.

The premier international competition is the Rugby League World Cup. The premier international club competition is the World Club Challenge, which is contested annually in February. The two major professional competitions are broken down as follows:

- National Rugby League:
  - Australia (17 teams)
  - New Zealand (1 team)
  - Papua New Guinea (1 team) 2028 onwards
- Super League:
  - England (12 teams)
  - France (2 teams)
  - Wales (currently no teams, part of system)

== Rules ==
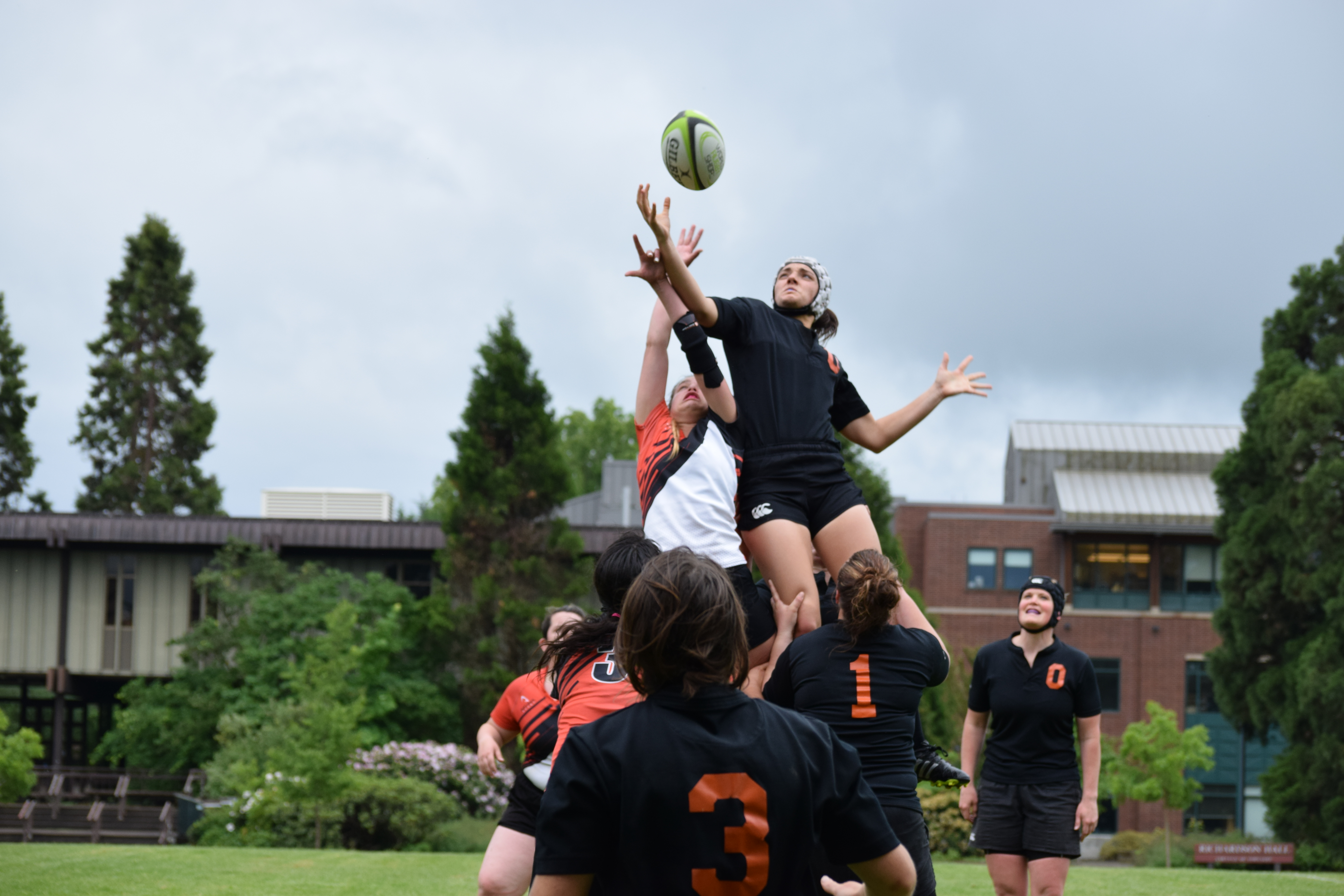
A rugby lineout being conducted. A group from either team lifts a player to fight and catch the ball for their team. (OSUWRC 2014)

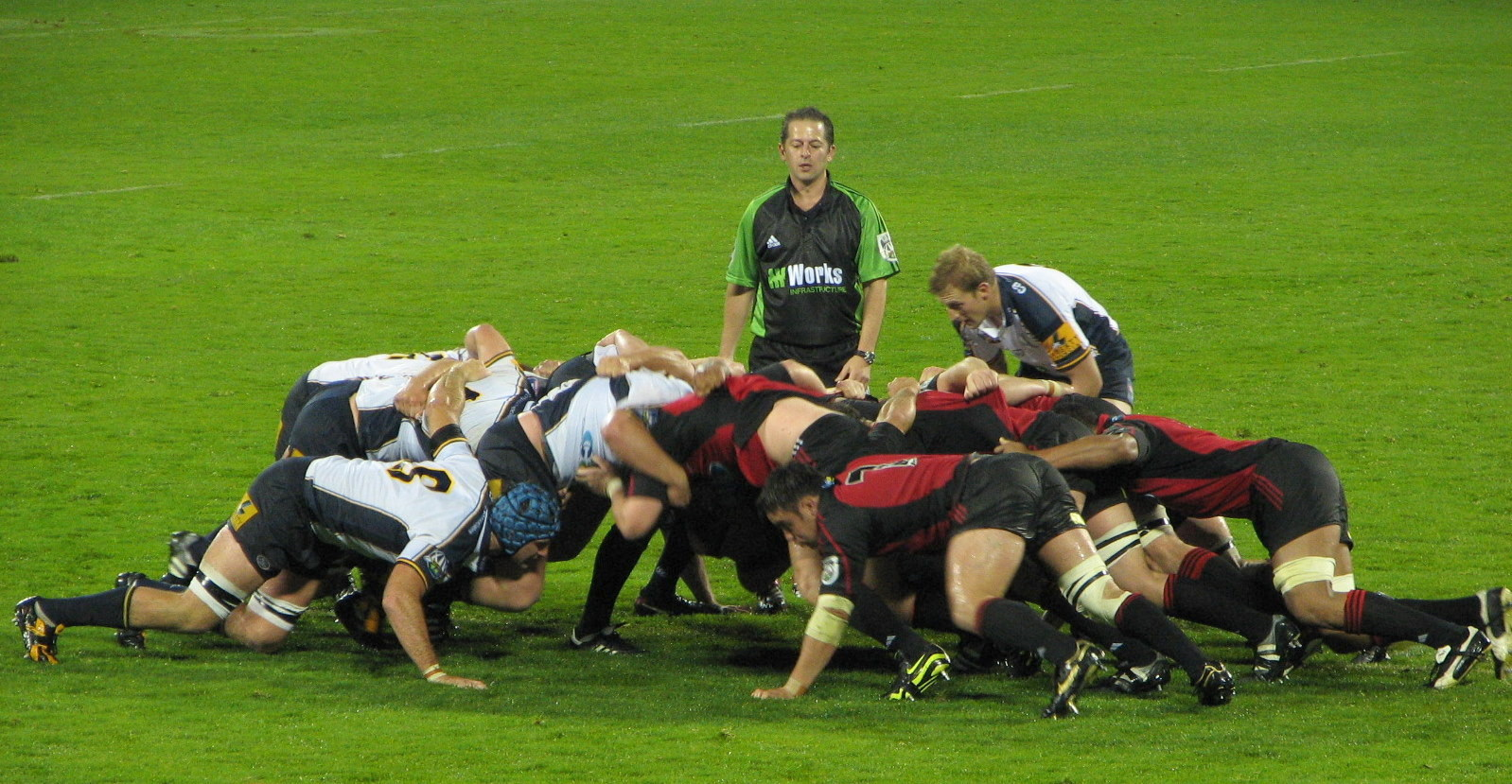
Rugby union: A scrum between the Crusaders and the Brumbies (May 2006)

Both major codes of rugby—rugby league and rugby union—share several distinctive characteristics that set them apart from other types of football. One of the most notable features is the use of an oval-shaped ball, which influences the style and flow of gameplay. Another defining rule in both codes is the strict prohibition of forward passing. This means that players are not allowed to throw the ball ahead to a teammate; instead, they must either pass the ball laterally or backward. As a result, teams can only advance toward the opponent's try line by running with the ball in hand or by kicking it strategically. Additionally, in contrast to American and Canadian football, athletes in both rugby union and rugby league do not wear protective gear or armor such as helmets or heavy padding. The physicality of the sport is managed through technique, rules, and discipline, rather than through the use of extensive protective equipment.

The two rugby codes differ as the result of changes made to the rules of rugby league. League implemented these changes with the aim of making a faster-paced and more try-oriented game than rugby union.

The main differences between the two games, besides league having teams of 13 players and union of 15, involve the tackle and its aftermath:

- Union players contest possession following the tackle: depending on the situation, either a ruck or a maul can occur. League players may not contest possession after making a tackle: play is continued with a play-the-ball.
- In league, if the team in possession fails to score before a set of six tackles, it surrenders possession. Union has no six-tackle rule; a team can keep the ball for an unlimited number of tackles before scoring as long as it maintains possession and does not commit an offence.

Set pieces of the union code include the scrum and the line-out. The scrum occurs after a minor infringement of the rules (most often a knock-on, when a player knocks the ball forward). After an infringement, packs of opposing players "scrum" or push against each other for possession. In a line-out, parallel lines of players from each team, arranged perpendicular to the touch-line, attempt to catch the ball thrown from touch. A rule has been added to line-outs which allows the jumper to be pulled down once a players' feet are on the ground.

In the league code, the scrum still exists albeit with greatly reduced importance. In league, the scrum involves fewer players and is rarely contested. Set pieces are generally started from the play-the-ball situation.

Many of the rugby league positions have names and requirements similar to rugby union positions. Notably, however, there are no flankers in rugby league.

== Culture ==
In England, rugby union is widely regarded as an "establishment" sport, played mostly by members of the upper and middle classes. For example, many pupils at public schools and grammar schools play rugby union, although the game (which had a long history of being played at state schools until the 1980s) is becoming increasingly popular in comprehensive schools. In contrast, rugby league has traditionally been seen as a working-class pursuit. Another exception to rugby union's upper-class stereotype is in Wales, where it has been traditionally associated with small village teams made up of coal miners and other industrial workers who played on their days off.

In Australia, support for both codes is concentrated in New South Wales, Queensland and the Australian Capital Territory (55% of the population), though rugby league is far more popular. The same perceived class barrier as exists between the two games in England also occurs in these states, fostered by rugby union's prominence and support at private schools.

Exceptions to the above include New Zealand, Wales, France (except Paris), Cornwall, Gloucestershire, Somerset, Scottish Borders, County Limerick (see Munster Rugby) and the Pacific Islands, where rugby union is popular in working class communities. Nevertheless, rugby league is perceived as the game of the working-class people in northern England and in the Australian states of New South Wales and Queensland.

In the United Kingdom, rugby union fans sometimes used the term "rugger" as an alternative name for the sport (see Oxford '-er'), although this archaic expression has not had currency since the 1950s or earlier. New Zealanders refer to rugby union simply as either "rugby" or "union", or even simply "football", and to rugby league as "rugby league" or "league". While "football" is now predominately a reference to soccer, many of the world's remaining 19th century founded rugby clubs continue to refer to themselves in their name as a "football club" (FC). Rugby historian Sean Fagan states that the now traditional quote, "Football is a gentleman's game played by hooligans, and Rugby is a hooligans' game played by gentlemen," was originally given by a Cambridge University Chancellor in the 1890s as "It is clear that one is a gentleman's game played by hooligans; the other a hooligan's game played by gentlemen."

== Injuries ==
About a quarter of rugby players are injured in each season.

Being a high contact sport, rugby union has the highest announced rates of concussions and outside England also has the highest number of catastrophic injuries among team sports. A 2014 study found that during match play concussion was reported at a higher level, and during training at a lower level, but still at a higher level than most players of any other sport receive.

== Rugby ball ==
In rugby union, World Rugby regulates the size and shape of the ball under Law 2 (also known as Law E.R.B); an official rugby union ball is oval and made of four panels, has a length in-line of 280–300 millimetres, a circumference (end to end) of 740–770 millimetres, and a circumference (in width) of 580–620 millimetres. It is made of leather or suitable synthetic material and may be treated to make it water resistant and easier to grip. The rugby ball may not weigh more than 460 grams or less than 410 and has an air pressure of 65.71–68.75 kilopascals, or 0.67–0.70 kilograms per square centimetre, or 9.5–10.0 lbs per square inch. Spare balls are allowed under the condition that players or teams do not seek an advantage by changing the ball. Smaller sized balls may also be used in games between younger players.

== World Cups ==
The Rugby League World Cup is an international tournament that is organized by the International Rugby League. The event has been staged at different intervals in a variety of formats. The first men's rugby league world cup was hosted by France in 1954, and won by Great Britain. Great Britain has won the tournament once more since, and New Zealand once. Australia has won the rugby league world cup 12 times, most recently in 2021, when England was the host country.

The Women's Rugby League World Cup was first held in 2000 and New Zealand won the inaugural tournament. The Wheelchair Rugby League World Cup, first held in 2008, is played by wheelchair-using teams and England won the inaugural tournament.

In rugby union, the Rugby World Cup, which was first held in New Zealand and Australia in 1987, occurs every four years. It is an international tournament organized by World Rugby. South Africa won the 2023 Rugby World Cup, which was played in France, in its fourth victory. New Zealand have won the men's tournament three times, Australia twice, and England once. The Women's Rugby World Cup was first held in 1991 and the United States won the inaugural tournament.

== See also ==
- College rugby
