= Upolu Samoa =

Former Samoan rugby union team

Upolu Samoa: 2007 Pacific Cup Champions

Upolu Samoa is a former Samoa rugby union representative team that played in the IRB Pacific Rugby Cup from 2006 to 2010. The other Samoan team in the Cup was Savaii Samoa. The players for Upolu Samoa were selected from all rugby union competitions in Samoa.

== History ==
The Upolu Samoa team failed to reach the final of the Pacific Rugby Cup in its inaugural year, 2006. Samoa was instead represented by Savaii Samoa, who won the title. After an entertaining 2007 tournament, Upolu managed to reach the final for the first time and became the Pacific Rugby Cup champions, defeating Tau'uta Reds in the final played at Teufaiva Stadium in Nukuʻalofa on 5 May 2007. Upolu Samoa hosted the final at Apia Park for the next two seasons but had to be satisfied with being runners-up on both occasions with Tautahi Gold winning 11 to 3 in 2008, and Fiji Warriors winning 19 to 7 in 2008.

== Record ==
=== Honours ===
Pacific Rugby Cup

- Champion: 2007.
- Runner-up: 2008, 2009.

=== Season standings ===
Pacific Rugby Cup

| Year | Pos | Pld | W | D | L | F | A | style="width:25 px;"|+/- | BP | Pts | Final | Notes |
|---|---|---|---|---|---|---|---|---|---|---|---|---|
| 2010 | 5th | 5 | 1 | 0 | 4 | 94 | 122 | −28 | 3 | 7 | — | Did not compete in finals |
| 2009 | 1st | 5 | 4 | 0 | 1 | 114 | 84 | +30 | 1 | 17 | 7–19 | Lost final to Fiji Warriors |
| 2008 | 1st | 5 | 4 | 0 | 1 | 90 | 49 | +41 | 1 | 17 | 3–11 | Lost final to Tautahi Gold |
| 2007 | 2nd | 5 | 3 | 0 | 2 | 112 | 114 | −2 | 3 | 15 | 35–15 | Won final against Tau'uta Reds |
| 2006 | 5th | 5 | 1 | 1 | 3 | 81 | 113 | −32 | 1 | 7 | — | Did not compete in finals |

== Squads ==
2008 Upolu Samoa Squad

2008 Squad

Forwards

- Taligatuli Moala, Paul Lewis, Solomona Tavita, Donald Kerslake, Ferro Faalogo, Esau Hunt, Evile Falefatu, Mulifusi Ulima, Muliufi Salanoa, Andrew Williams, Taleni Toloa, Tui Fitiao, Ola Pipili, Lavatai Toolo, Ken Ulia, Ruperake Petaia, Sikuka Uimaitua, Alapasa Cortz, Musolini Magele, Nissan Faatui, Leilua Fiu, Asiasiga Toalepaialii, Toalima Failalo, Sirovai Sila,

Backs

- Uale Mai, Notise Tauafao, Mike Gabriel, Roger Warren, Lolo Lui, Samasoni Moala, Gasolo Salima, Tulise Teni, Timoteo Iosua, Tuugasala Sione, Pulemalie Sopo, Joiner Key, Uaealesi Faatauvaa, Mathew Iakopo, Mikaele Pesamino, Taulgai Afamasaga, Suauu Puauli.

Coaching Team and Management

- Fepuleai Selefuti Patu (coach)
- Papaliitele Peter Fatialofa (assistant coach)
- Aiolupotea Taufusi Salesa (assistant coach)
- Ryan Schuster (manager).
