= Apikotoa =

Apikotoa is a surname. Notable people with the surname include:

- Fangatapu Apikotoa (born 1983), Tongan rugby union player
- Joe Apikotoa (born 1996), Tongan rugby union player
