= Stan Toʻomalatai =

Samoa international rugby union player

- Born: December 13, 1962 (age 63) Apia, Samoa
- Height: 5 ft 11 in (1.80 m)
- Notable relative(s): Carisbrook To'omalatai (son)

Rugby union career
- Position: Hooker
Senior career
Years	Team	Apps	(Points)
1985-1993	Vaiala		
1991-1993	Alhambra Union		
1994-1996	Vaiala		
1997	Helensville		
Provincial / State sides
Years	Team	Apps	(Points)
1993-1994	Otago	6	(0)
1997	North Harbour	12	(0)
International career
Years	Team	Apps	(Points)
1985-1995	Samoa	37	(29)
Coaching career
- Years: Team
- 2008-2011: Savaii Samoa

Paepaetele Stan To'omalatai (born 13 December 1962, in Apia) is a Samoan rugby union player. He plays as a hooker. He is father of the rugby player Carisbrook To'omalatai, who plays for Otago.

== Career ==
To'omalatai made his debut for Western Samoa on June 1, 1985, in a test match against Fiji at Apia. He was part of the Samoan team in the 1991 Rugby World Cup and in the 1994 Western Samoa rugby union tour of Australia. He was not present in the 1995 Rugby World Cup team. His last international match was during a test match against Fiji at Apia, on July 1, 1995.

== Coaching career ==
Between 2008 and 2011, To'omalatai, along with fellow Samoan international Andrew Aiolupo, coached Savaii Samoa. He also worked as assistant coach for the Samoa coach Aveau Niko Palamo in 2008-2009. He also took part at several charity events.
