= Tautahi Gold =

Former Tongan rugby union team

Tautahi Gold is a former Tongan rugby union team that played in the Pacific Rugby Cup from 2006 to 2010. The other Tongan team in the Cup was Tau'uta Reds. The team's name is from the Tautahi, which was Tonga's traditional Navy Army. Gold was chosen as the team's colour from the Sun which Tongans use as their navigational compass.

The home region of the Tautahi Gold team was a combination of Ha'apai, 'Eua and half of the Tongatapu Town District. It was important to the Union to make a home for the two teams to provide a pathway for players into Tonga's national rugby team.

Tautahi Gold were the Pacific Rugby Cup champions in 2008, defeating Upolu Samoa in the final played at Apia Park in Samoa on 14 May 2008.

== Record ==
=== Honours ===
Pacific Rugby Cup

- Champion: 2008.

=== Season standings ===
Pacific Rugby Cup

Year	Pos	Pld	W	D	L	F	A	+/-	BP	Pts	Final	Notes
2010	3rd	5	3	0	2	102	93	+9	2	14	—	Did not compete in finals
2009	4th	5	3	0	2	110	78	+32	3	15	—	Did not compete in finals
2008	2nd	5	3	0	2	97	75	+22	1	13	11–3	Won final against Upolu Samoa
2007	6th	5	2	0	3	84	98	−14	1	9	—	Did not compete in finals
2006	6th	5	1	1	3	62	94	−32	1	7	—	Did not compete in finals

== Squads ==
2010 Tautahi Gold Squad

2010 squad

Note: Flags indicate national union under World Rugby eligibility rules. Players may hold more than one non-World Rugby nationality.

Player	Position	Union
Makoni Finau	Prop	Tonga
Afele Tongia	Prop	Tonga
Otulea Fifita	Prop	Tonga
Paea Siulangapo	Prop	Tonga
Sione Fukofuka	Prop	Tonga
Siosateki Mata'u	Prop	Tonga
Sione Vaimounga	Hooker	Tonga
Soane Ledger	Hooker	Tonga
Akameta Feao	Lock	Tonga
Kelepi Halafihi	Lock	Tonga
Sione Poteki	Lock	Tonga
Jack Ram	Flanker	Tonga
Petelo Tupou	Flanker	Tonga
Rutikha Ilolahia	Flanker	Tonga
Sione Kalamafoni	Number 8	Tonga

Player	Position	Union
Soane Havea	Scrum-half	Tonga
Sepuloni Makaafi	Fly-half	Tonga
Atunaisa Sikalu	Centre	Tonga
Maamaloa Kuluka	Centre	Tonga
Mahe Fangupo	Centre	Tonga
Ofa Koloamatangi	Centre	Tonga
Viliami Hakalo	Wing	Tonga
Tupou Palu	Wing	Tonga
Mesui Lemoto	Fullback	Tonga
Sitaleki Lu'au	Fullback	Tonga

== Internationally capped players ==
- (Tonga) Isilele Matakaiongo Tupou
- (Tonga) Samisoni Pone
- (Tonga) Fangatapu 'Apikotoa
- (Tonga) Soane Havea
- (Tonga) Samiu Ika
