= Prince Edward Park, Lalomalava =

Sports ground in Lalomalava, Samoa

Coordinates: 13°42′36.1″S 172°12′27.98″W

Prince Edward Park is a sports ground in Lalomalava, Salelologa, on the island of Savai'i in Samoa. The ground is used for rugby, as well as Samoa AFL, cricket, and soccer. It is the home ground of the Savaii Samoa Rugby Union Team.

The park consists of two rugby grounds, with grandstand seating for approximately one hundred people. The park is also the location of the Oceania Football Confederation's regional technical centre.

== History ==
The park is named after Prince Edward of York, who in the early 1900s visited Savai'i and opened this park; which, at the time, was just a field. It was formally opened by Prince Edward, son of Elizabeth II, on 13 October 1992. In 2021, the UK High Commission in Samoa installed a monument at the park commemorating the event.

There are no seating stands in the park. However, there is a complimentary shading area provided by whoever hosts the matches played at this park. There are 2 small changing rooms, a meeting area for the playing teams and there are a few Fale scattered on the outskirts of the park. In 2007, it has been recorded that the park can hold around 5,000 people. Night Games cannot be played here in this Park, since there are no floodlights provided.

There is also a Training Field on the northern end of the Park. Beach Volleyball is also played on the little Beach Volleyball Court, alongside the Training Field. The Beach Volleyball Court is used for the Public and the Savai'ian State Volleyball Team.

A new cricket net provided by Cricket Samoa has also been added towards the preparations for the 2007 Asia/Oceania ICC Qualifications.

== 2007 Pacific Rugby Cup ==
Prince Edward Park hosted a single game for the 2007 Pacific Rugby Cup, between Samoa Savai'i and Tonga Tau'uta Reds. It hosted another match for the 2008 Cup.

== Future Refurbishments ==
It has been told that this park will undergo refurbishment in 2008. Prince Edwards Park will be renowned as the 2nd Official Home Ground in Samoa. At the moment, Prince Edwards Park isn't set to International Standards.

Proper seating stands for approximately 5,000 people will be built, plus a larger changing room and meeting area for the playing teams. Floodlights and a small electronic scoreboard will be added. A few stores will also be built in the surrounding area and a Bus Terminal will also be included in the Building Package.

Prince Edward Park is aiming to become the main sporting ground in Savaii, and have Asau and Maota as minor sporting parks in Savai'i.

In 2020, the park hosted the Vodafone Iva Savai'i Sevens competition.
