= Fangatapu Apikotoa =

Tonga international rugby union player

- Born: August 31, 1983 (age 43)
- Height: 6 ft 0 in (1.83 m)
- Weight: 200 lb (91 kg)

Rugby union career
- Position(s): Flyhalf, Utility back
Amateur team(s)
Years	Team	Apps	(Points)
- Amatori Alghero
Senior career
Years	Team	Apps	(Points)
2009–present	Coventry		
International career
Years	Team	Apps	(Points)
2004–present	Tonga	18	(82)

Fangatapu Apikotoa (born 31 August 1983) is a Tongan rugby union player who currently plays for the Tautahi Gold in the World Rugby Pacific Challenge. His preferred position is fly half but also can slot into the centre and full back positions.

He also played his rugby for the Marist Ma'ufanga Rugby Club in the Datec Cup Provincial Championship in Tonga.

He made his test debut for Tonga against Samoa on May 24, 2004, and has played 18 test matches and scored 87 points.

He signed for Coventry R.F.C. in the English Championship for the 2009/2010 season, making his debut against the Exeter Chiefs in September 2009.
