= Soane Havea =

Tongan rugby union player

- Born: Soane Patita Pat Boone Sioape Havea; August 29, 1981 (age 45) Tonga
- Height: 5 ft 5 in (1.65 m)
- Weight: 188 lb (85 kg)

Rugby union career
- Position(s): Flyhalf, Scrumhalf
International career
Years	Team	Apps	(Points)
2000-	Tonga	26	(0)

Soane Havea, full name, Soane Patita Pat Boone Sioape Havea (born 29 August 1981) is a Tongan rugby union player who currently plays for the Tautahi Gold in the IRB Pacific Rugby Cup. His favourite position is scrum-half.

He also plays for the Marist Ma'ufanga Rugby Club in the Datec Cup Provincial Championship

He made his international test debut for Tonga against New Zealand on June 16, 2000. He was part of the Tonga team at the 2007 Rugby World Cup.
