= 2020 Oceania Rugby Under 20 Championship =

Sporting event

2020 Oceania Rugby Under 20 Trophy
- Countries: Samoa
- Date: 22 February 2020
- Champions: Samoa (1st title)
- Matches played: 1
- Top point scorer: Louis Bartley-Saena (11)
- Top try scorer: Viliamu Faamatuaainu (2)

The 2020 Oceania Rugby Under 20s was only contested in the Trophy division where Samoa won their first under-20 title by defeating Tonga in a one-off match played in February at Apia Park. The Championship division, originally planned for 27 May to 6 June, was postponed and then cancelled due to travel and public health restrictions in place for the COVID-19 pandemic. Teams from Australia, New Zealand, Fiji and Japan had been scheduled to play at Bond University on the Gold Coast.

== Trophy match ==
22 February 2020
10:00

Samoa	36–3	Tonga
Try: Niue 12'; Faamatuaainu (2) 25' 67'; Onosa'i 30', Saotui-Huta 53'm Con: Bartley-Saena (4/5) 13' 27' 31' 67'; Pen: Bartley-Saena 4'; Cards: Niue (YC) 59'; Leafa Lemalu (YC) 64'	Report; Scores	Pen: Asi 8'; Cards: Manukeu (YC) 15'

Apia Park, Samoa

Samoa
Oceania Trophy Winner
First title
