= 1994 Western Samoa rugby union tour of Australia =

Summary
P	W	D	L
Total
5	4	0	1
Test match
1	0	0	1
Opponent
P	W	D	L
Australia
1	0	0	1

The 1994 Samoa rugby union tour of Australia was a series of five matches played by Samoa in Australia during July and August 1994.

Samoa won the first four matches against Victoria, ACT, Queensland and a New South Wales XV, but lost the Test against Australia in the final match of the tour in Sydney.

The Samoan team had played 17 games for the year by that stage. The tour followed closely after the Pacific Tri-Nations and Super 10 tournaments, which included matches in New Zealand, South Africa, Fiji, and Australia.

== Results ==
=== Victoria vs Western Samoa ===
23 July 1994

Victoria (Victoria (state))	26–60	Western Samoa

Olympic Park, Melbourne

=== ACT Kookaburras vs Western Samoa ===
27 July 1994

ACT Kookaburras (Australian Capital Territory)	13–39	Western Samoa

Manuka Oval, Canberra

=== Queensland vs Western Samoa ===
31 July 1994

Queensland	22–24	Western Samoa

Ballymore, Brisbane

=== New South Wales XV vs Western Samoa ===
3 August 1994

New South Wales XV	18–21	Western Samoa

Marathon Stadium, Newcastle

=== Australia vs Western Samoa ===
6 August 1994

Australia	73–3	Western Samoa
Try: Campese, Gavin, Gregan, Howard, Junee, Little (2), Ofahengaue, Pini, D. Smith (2); Con: Knox (6); Pen: Knox (2)	Report	Pen: Kellett

Sydney Football Stadium, Sydney
Attendance: 30,167
Referee: Glenn Wahlstrom (New Zealand)

FB	15	Matt Pini
RW	14	David Campese
OC	13	Pat Howard
IC	12	Jason Little
LW	11	Damian Smith
FH	10	David Knox
SH	9	George Gregan
LP	1	Tony Daly
HK	2	Phil Kearns (c)
TP	3	Ewen McKenzie
LL	4	Garrick Morgan
RL	5	John Eales
BF	6	Viliami Ofahengaue
OF	7	David Wilson
N8	8	Tim Gavin
Replacements:
FB	16	Darren Junee
CE	17	Dan Herbert
Coach:
(Australia) Bob Dwyer

FB	15	Andrew Aiolupo
RW	14	Brian Lima
OC	13	To'o Vaega
IC	12	Freddie Tuilagi
LW	11	Toa Samania
FH	10	Darren Kellett
SH	9	Va'apu'u Vitale
LP	1	Peter Fatialofa (c)
HK	2	Stan To'omalatai
TP	3	George Latu
LL	4	Mark Birtwistle
RL	5	Mata'afa Keenan
BF	6	Dylan Mika
OF	7	Sila Vaifale
N8	8	Pat Lam
Replacements:
FL	16	Malaki Iupeli
SH	17	Tu Nu'uali'itia
Coach:
(Samoa) Peter Schuster
