= Rugby union in Samoa =

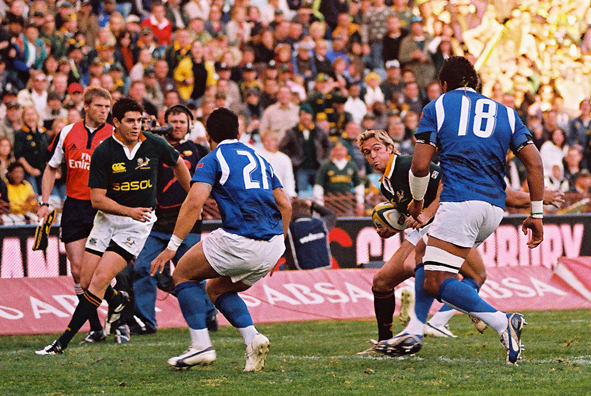
- Springbok Percy Montgomery faces off Samoans Elvis Seveali'i (21) and Joe Tekori (18).
- Country: Samoa
- Governing body: Lakapi Samoa
- National team: Samoa
- Nickname: Manu Samoa
- First played: 1920
- Registered players: 23,372
- Clubs: 140

National competitions
- Rugby World Cup; Pacific Nations Cup; Rugby World Cup Sevens; IRB Sevens World Series

Club competitions
- Pacific Rugby Cup; Datec Cup Provincial Championship

Rugby union in Samoa is the country's most popular sport. The national teams in both the standard 15-man game and rugby sevens are consistently competitive against teams from vastly more populous nations.

== Governing body ==
Rugby union is governed by Lakapi Samoa who are also members of the Pacific Islands Rugby Alliance.

Samoa were awarded 'second tier' status by the International Rugby Board which entitles them to funding from the IRB.

Lakapi Samoa was founded in 1924, as the "Apia Rugby Union", and affiliated to the NZRFU in the same year. As the Western Samoa Rugby Football Union, it joined the IRB in 1988. When Western Samoa amended its constitution to change the country's name from Western Samoa to Samoa, the union also changed its name, and dropped the word football to become the Samoa Rugby Union. The union is also a member of the Federation of Oceania Rugby Unions (FORU).

== History ==
The Marist Brothers brought the game to Samoa in 1920 and The Apia Rugby Union was formed in 1924.

On August 18, 1924 Western Samoa played its first international against Fiji in the capital Apia, the visitors winning 6–0.

The Pacific Tri-Nations series between Tonga, Fiji and Western Samoa was established in 1982.

The Western Samoa Rugby Football Union joined the International Rugby Board in 1988. Western Samoa played in the World Cup for the first time in 1991.

The Pacific Islands Rugby Alliance (PIRA) was set up in 2002 as a basis of co-operation between the Fiji Rugby Union, Samoa Rugby Union and Tonga Rugby Football Union.

In 2006, the Pacific Tri-Nations was replaced by the IRB Pacific 5 Nations which was then renamed the Pacific Nations Cup. The IRB Pacific Rugby Cup started in 2006 with Upolu Samoa and Savaii Samoa representing Samoa.

Rugby was first introduced into Samoa around the turn of the 20th century, when it was still a German colony. It is believed that the first people to introduce it there were missionaries from New Zealand.

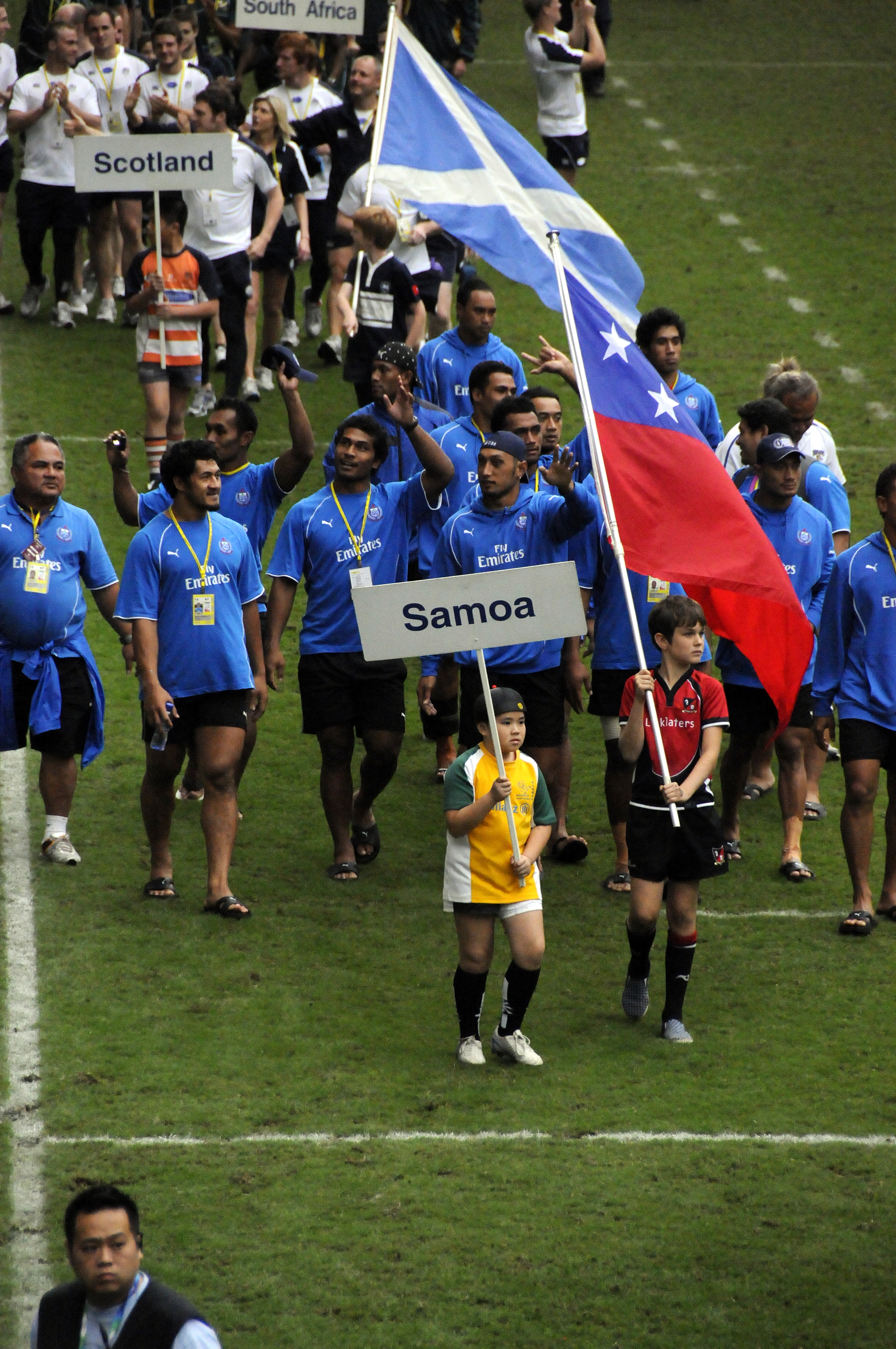
The Samoa Sevens team in March 2009.

For many years, Western Samoa's international contact was confined to the other South Sea islands of Fiji and Tonga. This is partly because of the isolation of the islands. Their first international was against Fiji, in 1924, and featured a palm tree in the middle of the pitch.

There was also a large amount of contact with New Zealand, where many Samoans would migrate to in the 20th century.

Samoa first came to major international attention in 1986, when they toured Wales. Their test against the Welsh national side produced a result of 32–14. This was also seen as a major turning point as previously there had been a debate as to whether to have an international team at all, as many players had traditionally defected to New Zealand. Samoa rugby's relationship with New Zealand rugby has been a mixed blessing. On the one hand it has allowed Samoa to recruit amongst the massive pool of first and second generation Samoan migrants in New Zealand, but conversely it also meant that for many Samoans, their highest ambition was to win a cap in the All Blacks. Notable Samoan-New Zealander players include Michael Jones and Peter Schuster.

Controversially Samoa was not invited to the first World Cup - although Tonga and Fiji were. This led to a massive campaign to build up a side good enough to qualify for the 1991 Rugby World Cup. They selected Bryan Williams, who had been a winger for the All Blacks to be their coach, and using a mixture of home grown backs such as Brian Lima and Mathew Vaea, and no nonsense New Zealand based forwards such as Mark Birtwistle, Pat Lam Mat Keenan, and Peter Fatialofa, he wielded a disparate group of talented individuals into a side which quickly came to dominate Fiji and Tonga and gain access to the world cup.

Samoa's performance at the 1991 Rugby World Cup was superb, and proved that they were an international force to be reckoned with. After beating Wales in the first game in Cardiff, they beat Argentina. In a nail bitingly close finish, they were beaten 9-3 by Australia, who would later win the tournament. However, they were beaten 28-6 by Scotland.

== Popularity ==
Rugby union is the most popular sport in Samoa, with 12 provincial unions made up of around 120 clubs and nearly 5,000 senior and twice as many junior players in a country with a population of just under 175,000 people.

Prominent Samoan players include Eliota Fuimaono-Sapolu Alesana Tuilagi Freddie Tuilagi, Apollo Perelini, Lome Fa'atau, Lolani Koko, Pat Lam, Brian Lima, current sevens captain Lolo Lui, and two winners of the IRB International Sevens Player of the Year Award in Uale Mai and Mikaele Pesamino.

== Competitions ==
=== National Provincial Championship ===
This is the second highest level of domestic competition within Samoan rugby union and is a stepping stone for local players into international rugby. Teams play within their respective unions, and then the top teams from each union then contest the finals series held at Apia Park. The Apia West and Apia union teams usually dominate.

=== Pacific Rugby Cup ===
The IRB Pacific Rugby Cup started in 2006 and involves representative teams from the three Pacific rugby unions, Fiji, Tonga and Samoa. Samoa, along with Tonga and Fiji, have two sides in the tournament, Savaii Samoa and Upolu Samoa. The aim of the tournament is to improve the quality of rugby in the Pacific Islands.

== Representative teams ==
=== National ===
The national team known as Manu Samoa have competed at every Rugby World Cup since 1991, and have made the quarter-finals in 1991, 1995 and 1999.

Samoa also play in the Pacific Nations Cup and the Pacific Tri-Nations. The sport is governed by Lakapi Samoa, were members of the Pacific Islands Rugby Alliance, and thus, also contributed to the international Pacific Islanders rugby union team.

=== Pacific Tri-Nations ===
The Pacific Tri-Nations is the series between Tonga, Fiji and Samoa. It has been played since 1982. It was replaced by the Pacific Nations Cup.

=== Pacific Nations Cup ===
The Pacific Nations Cup is a competition most often held between six Pacific Rim sides; Fiji, Japan, Samoa, Tonga, Canada, and the United States. The inaugural competition in 2006, known as the IRB Pacific 5 Nations, featured New Zealand's "A" side, the Junior All Blacks. In 2007, Australia A joined the original IRB Pacific 5 Nations teams in the new IRB Pacific Nations Cup. The 2008 competition saw the Junior All Blacks replaced by the New Zealand Māori, a developmental side made up entirely of players from the country's indigenous Māori people. In 2009, Australia A did not play and the Junior All Blacks returned. The 2010 competition had no participation from Australia or New Zealand, and was won by Manu Samoa.

== National (sevens) ==
The Samoa national rugby sevens team is one of the 15 "core teams" that compete in every event in the annual World Rugby Sevens Series. Long a solidly competitive side, Samoa Sevens burst into prominence in 2006–07, when they ran traditional favourites New Zealand and Fiji very close for the title. They cemented their status as one of the world's sevens powers by winning the 2009–10 season title.

== Samoa rules ==
Samoa rules is a traditional sport derived from Australian rules football and rugby union that is occasionally played in Samoa. It generally uses rugby pitches, H posts and 15-a-side teams, but is played to Australian rules otherwise.

== See also ==
- Sport in Samoa
- Culture of Samoa
- American Samoa national rugby union team
- Rugby union in American Samoa
