= Fiji Barbarians =

The Fiji Barbarians is a Fijian former rugby union representative team that played in the Pacific Rugby Cup from 2006 to 2010. The other Fijian team in the Cup was the Fiji Warriors. The players were drawn from the Fijian domestic competitions.

The Fiji Barbarians team qualified for the 2010 Pacific Cup final but lost the match to countrymen the Fiji Warriors by 17–26 at the National Stadium in Suva. The team had not featured in the finals for the previous four seasons.

== Record ==
=== Honours ===
Pacific Rugby Cup

- Runners-up: 2010.

=== Season standings ===
Pacific Rugby Cup

Year	Pos	Pld	W	D	L	F	A	+/-	BP	Pts	Final	Notes
2010	2nd	5	4	0	1	145	116	+29	3	19	17–26	Lost final to Fiji Warriors
2009	6th	5	1	0	4	74	191	−117	1	5	—	Did not compete in finals
2008	4th	5	2	0	3	72	90	−18	2	10	—	Did not compete in finals
2007	3rd	5	2	0	3	97	108	−11	4	12	—	Did not compete in finals
2006	3rd	5	2	1	2	76	73	+3	2	12	—	Did not compete in finals

== Squads ==
2008 Fiji Barbarians Squad

2008 Pacific Rugby Cup Squad:

Forwards: Sikeli Gavidi; Sakeo Latianara; Warui Aritema; Tiko Matawalu**; Sisari Tagivakatini; Aseri Buli; Eseroma Cakacaka; Mosese Fatiaki; Filipe Kuruvoli; Joeli Lutumailagi; Alusio Nailiko; Samu Bola; Mitieli Cama; Aminiasi Nava***; Kolonio Vasu; Aca Bibi; Josefa Nagatalevu	Backs: Kelemedi Bola; Nemia Kenatale; Aminiasi Bosenawai; Ravai Fatiaki; Tikiko Uluiviti; Timoci Mule; Masi Naoma; Ropate Ratu; Alusio Buto; Eneri Kuru; Vima Tuidraki***; Apisalome Waqabaca; Simeli Koniferedi	Reserves: Paulo Cata; Sairusi Kadi; Seremaia Naireureu; Kaminieli Naqisa; Mosese Natuilagilagi; Manueli Nawalu; Seveci Taka**; Peni Tora; Jone Cagi

- * denotes players who were in the Fiji 2007 RWC squad.
- ** denotes players who have played for Fiji in a Test.
- *** denotes players who have played 7s for Fiji in the IRB Series.

Coaching team

- Coach: Etuate Waqa
- Manager: Isei Raiyawa
- Assistant coach (Forwards): Josua Toakula
- Assistant coach (Backs): Luke Rogoyawa

== See also ==
- Australian Barbarians
- Brussels Barbarians
- French Barbarians
- New Zealand Barbarians
- South African Barbarians
