= Andrew Aiolupo =

Samoa international rugby union player

- Born: Toleafoa Anitelea Aiolupotea; 17 January 1963 (age 63) Apia, Samoa

Rugby union career
- Position: Fullback
Senior career
Years	Team	Apps	(Points)
1983-1994	Moata'a		
International career
Years	Team	Apps	(Points)
1983-1994	Samoa	36	(83)
Coaching career
- Years: Team
- 2005-2007: Samoa (backs coach)
- 2008-2011: Savaii Samoa

Toleafoa Andrew Anitelea Aiolupo (Samoan:Anitelea Aiolupo), known also as Andy Aiolupotea (born Apia, 17 January 1963) is a former Samoan rugby union player. He played as a fullback.

== Career ==
During his amateur rugby career, Aiolupo played for the Samoan club Moata'a. He made his debut with Western Samoa against Tonga, at Suva, on 22 June 1983. He was part of the 1991 Rugby World Cup roster. His last international match was against Australia, at Sydney, on 6 August 1994, playing 36 games and gaining 83 points. In particular, Aiolupo's achievements included participating at the tours of Britain and Ireland in 1988 and of Australia in 1994, playing at the 1991 Rugby World Cup and the 1993 Rugby World Cup Sevens for Samoa sevens. One of the highlights of his performances for the Samoa national team was the game against Bridgend on 22 October 1988: Aiolupo, number 22, scattered Samoa's left-flank attack after a lineout, ending with a pass through the centre and a try scored by Tauvere Ugapo.

Officially, for the Samoa national team, then known as Western Samoa, Aiolupo played 37 test matches, scoring 83 points. His debut was during the test match against Tonga, at Suva, on June 22, 1983. His last international match was against Australia, at Sydney, on 6 August 1994. He took part at four matches in the 1991 Rugby World Cup, where the Samoan team reached the quarter-finals. However, he did not score points during the tournament. In 1993, he also competed at the Rugby World Cup Sevens, the first competition in history of rugby sevens. He was declared the number 1 in the tournament. Samoa with him reached the quarter-finals. Aiolupo played 8 matches in the tournament and scored 85 points - scoring 5 tries and scored 30 successful conversions.

In 1986, Aiolupo also represented Samoa in rugby league at the 1986 Pacific Cup. In 1995, he switched codes to rugby league alongside Fata Sini, both being appointed as development officers for the Western Samoa Rugby League Association.

In 2005, he was part of the coaching staff (as backs coach) of the Manu Samoa during Michael Jones tenure as coach, along with fellow Manu Samoa former players Peter Fatialofa and Frank Bunce. He also coached Savaii Samoa between 2015 and 2012. Currently, he is a Development Officer for Samoa Rugby Union.
