= Na'ama Leleimalefaga =

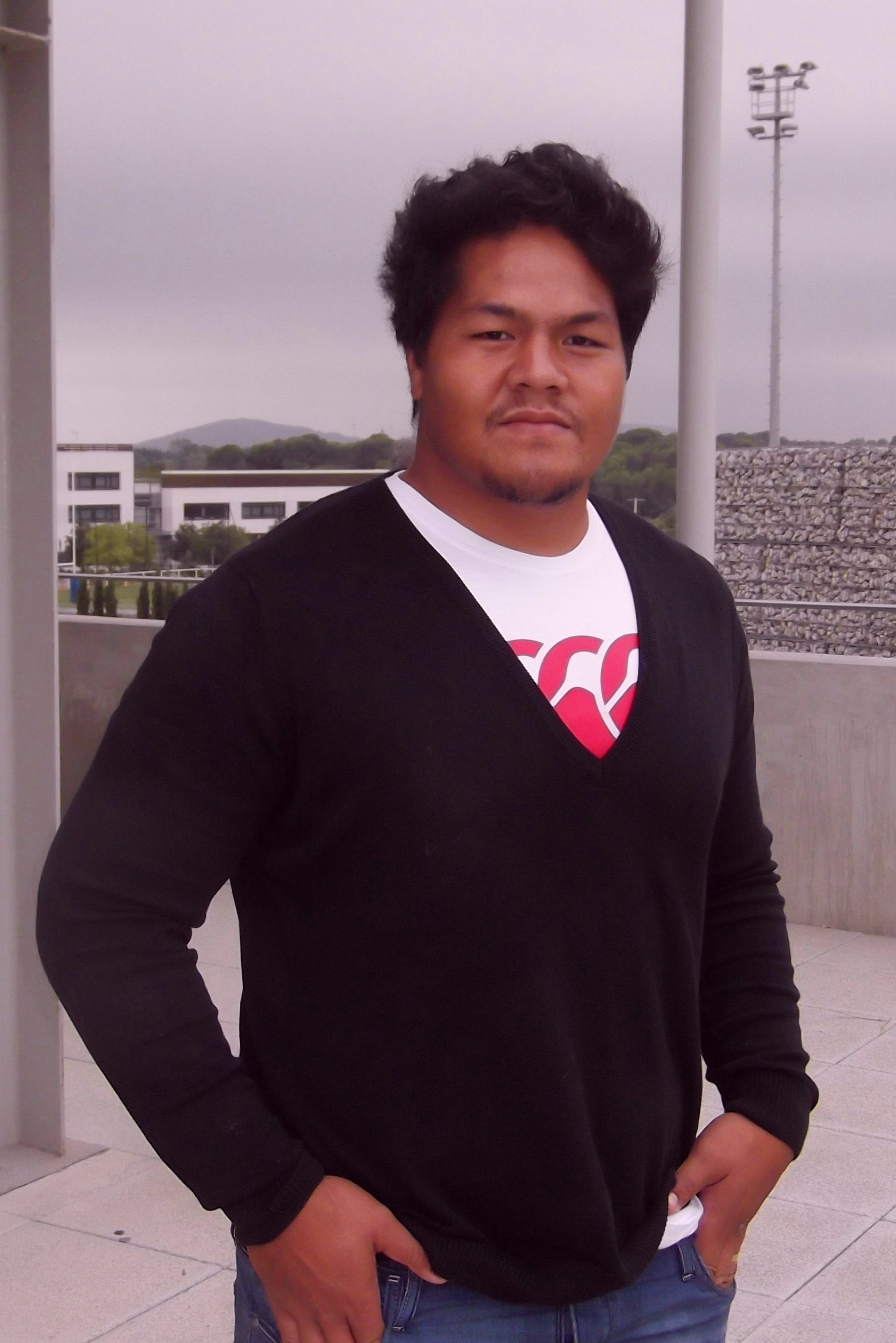
- Born: November 20, 1987 (age 38) Apia, Samoa
- Height: 5 ft 10 in (1.78 m)
- Weight: 130 kg (20 st 7 lb)

Rugby union career
- Position: Prop
Senior career
| Years | Team | Apps | (Points) |
| 2007-2015 | Montpellier | 71 | (0) |
| 2015-2017 | Worcester | 37 | (0) |
| 2017- | CA Brive | 8 | (0) |
International career
| Years | Team | Apps | (Points) |
| 2007 | Samoa | 2 | (0) |

Na'ama Leleimalefaga (born 20 November 1987 in Palauli) is a Samoan rugby union prop. He is a member of the Samoa national rugby union team and participated with the squad at the 2007 Rugby World Cup. He currently plays for the Worcester Warriors. He previously played for Scopa and Savaii Samoa.
