= Tau'uta Reds =

Former Tongan rugby union team

Tau'uta Reds is a former Tongan rugby union team that played in the Pacific Rugby Cup from 2006 to 2010. The other Tongan team in the Cup was Tautahi Gold.

The team's name is from the Tau’uta who were the Tongan land warriors that fought in the war which united Tonga as one kingdom. Red represents the colour of blood and the sacrifice which the saviour made on the cross for all mankind.

The Tau'uta Reds were minor premiers in 2007 and hosted the Pacific Rugby Cup final at Teufaiva Stadium in Nukuʻalofa on 5 May 2007, but lost the match 15–35 to Upolu Samoa.

== Record ==
=== Honours ===
Pacific Rugby Cup

- Runner-up: 2007.

=== Season standings ===
Pacific Rugby Cup

Year	Pos	Pld	W	D	L	F	A	+/-	BP	Pts	Final	Notes
2010	6th	5	1	0	4	82	169	−87	1	5	—	Did not compete in finals
2009	5th	5	1	0	4	62	113	−51	2	6	—	Did not compete in finals
2008	5th	5	2	0	3	84	95	−11	1	9	—	Did not compete in finals
2007	1st	5	4	0	1	108	102	+6	1	17	15–35	Lost final to Upolu Samoa
2006	4th	5	2	0	3	70	89	−19	2	10	—	Did not compete in finals

== Internationally capped players ==
- (Tonga) Hudson Tongaʻuiha
- (Tonga) Isileli Fine
- (Tonga) Mesui Lemoto
- (Tonga) Rodney Mahe
- (Tonga) Sateki Mata'u
- (Tonga) Tatafu Na'aniumotu
- (Tonga) Toma Toke
- (Tonga) Tevita Tanginoa
- (Tonga) Teu'i Muli Kaufusi
