= Savaii Samoa =

Former Samoan rugby union team

Savaii takes on the Fiji Warriors

Savaii Samoa is a former Samoa rugby union representative team that played in the Pacific Rugby Cup from 2006 to 2010. The other Samoan team in the Cup was Upolu Samoa. Savaii Samoa and Upolu Samoa were selected from tournaments that took place in Samoa. Most of the players selected in these two teams were local players.

The Savaii Samoa team beat Air Pacific Fiji Warriors 10-5 at Marist Ground in Apia, Samoa to win the inaugural Pacific Rugby Cup in 2006, but did not feature in the finals for the remaining four seasons.

== Record ==
=== Honours ===
Pacific Rugby Cup

- Champions: 2006.

=== Season standings ===
Pacific Rugby Cup

Year	Pos	Pld	W	D	L	F	A	+/-	BP	Pts	Final	Notes
2010	4th	5	2	0	3	105	110	−5	2	10	—	Did not compete in finals
2009	3rd	5	3	0	2	103	91	+12	3	15	—	Did not compete in finals
2008	3rd	5	3	0	2	81	81	0	1	13	—	Did not compete in finals
2007	4th	5	2	0	3	106	88	18	3	11	—	Did not compete in finals
2006	1st	5	4	0	1	120	81	+39	2	18	10–5	Won final against Fiji Warriors

== Squads ==
2008 Savaii Samoa Squad

Forwards

- Lafoga Aoelua, Loleni Tafunai, Viliamu Viliamu, Hore Tea, Poutoa Iosi, Se'e Lepa, Steve Faatau, Tua Ale, Rudy Leavasa, Egelani Fale, Luti Pese, Lale Latu, Wally Esau, Keneti Tofilau, Joe Taina, Ulia Ulia, Robert Ah Kuoi, Avaelalo Tito, Solomona Aimaasu, Maugaloto Palu, Ponifasio Vasa, Alafoti Fa'osiliva, Tele Ese, Fisoa Faaiu.

Backs

- Alatasi Tupou, Ese Fale, Gafa Siona, Ki Anufe, Afa Lesa, Mark Tanuvasa, Silaumua Potifele, Fale Afamasaga, Reupena Lavasa, Junior Leota, Chris Lei Sam, Aifou Faamausili, Tom Iosefa, Anekosi Faamoe, Fanuafou Tofi, Sitiveni Leleimalefaga

Coaching Panel:

- Paepae Stan To'omalatai (Coach)
- Toleafoa Anitelea Aiolupo (Ass. Coach)
- Junior Alesana (Manager)
2007 Savaii Samoa Squad

Note: Flags indicate national union under World Rugby eligibility rules. Players may hold more than one non-World Rugby nationality.

Player	Position	Union
Joe Taina	Fullback	Samoa
Afa Lesa	Fullback	Samoa
Tauvaga Faafou	Wing	Samoa
Esera Lauina	Wing	Samoa
Meki Magele	Wing	Samoa
Thomas Timani	Wing	Samoa
Alesana Laumea	Centre	Samoa
Iulio Sititi	Centre	Samoa
Suafai Taialii	Centre	Samoa
Fanuafou Tofi	Centre	Samoa
Alvin Tavana	Fly-half	Samoa
Earl Va'a	Fly-half	Samoa
Gafa Siona	Scrum-half	Samoa
Paul Chang Tung	Scrum-half	Samoa

Player	Position	Union
Rudy Leavasa (captain)	Prop	Samoa
Na'ama Leleimalefaga	Prop	Samoa
Sui Liaga	Prop	Samoa
Thompson Soanai	Prop	Samoa
Lafoga Auelua	Hooker	Samoa
Steve Faatau	Hooker	Samoa
Loleni Tafunai	Hooker	Samoa
Lome Fa'asavalu Tonu	Hooker	Samoa
Sio Isara	Lock	Samoa
Lale Latu	Lock	Samoa
Tala Mataena	Lock	Samoa
Luti Pese	Lock	Samoa
Filisoa Faaiu	Flanker	Samoa
Egelani Fale	Flanker	Samoa
Malo Nofoagatotoa	Flanker	Samoa
Manaia Salavea	Flanker	Samoa
Sio Sosa	Flanker	Samoa
Ulia Ulia	Flanker	Samoa
Ponifasio Vasa	Flanker	Samoa

Coaching Panel:

- Paepae Stan Toomalatai (Coach)
- Toleafoa Anitelea Aiolupo (Ass. Coach)
- Junior Alesana (Manager)
