= Pacific Islands Rugby Alliance =

The Pacific Islands Rugby Alliance (PIRA) was set up in 2002 as a basis of co-operation between the Fiji, Samoa and Tonga Rugby Unions. Niue and the Cook Islands also became members of the Alliance and supplied players to the Pacific Islanders team.
