= Tino i Iva =

Village on the island of Savai'i in Samoa

Coordinates: 13°42′32.45″S 172°12′34.85″W

Tino i Iva (also known as Iva), is a village at the east end of Savai'i island in Samoa. The village is part of the electoral constituency (Faipule District) Fa'asaleleaga 2 which is within the larger political district (Itumalo) of Fa'asaleleaga.

The population is 749.
