= Tonga Rugby Union =

Sports governing body

- Sport: Rugby union
- Founded: 1923; 103 years ago
- World Rugby affiliation: 1987
- President: Epi Taione
- Men's coach: Toutai Kefu
- Website: tonga-rugby.to

The Tonga Rugby Union is the governing body of the sport of rugby union in Tonga. They are members of Oceania Rugby. There is a rugby union playing population of fewer than 800 out of a total population of 100,000.

They were formed in 1923, and joined the World Rugby in 1987 when they were invited to play in the inaugural Rugby World Cup.

== National teams ==
The Tonga national rugby union team is nicknamed ʻIkale Tahi (Sea Eagles). Like their Polynesian neighbours, the Tongans start their matches with a war dance – the Sipi Tau. They are members of Oceania Rugby. Tonga achieved a historic 19–14 victory over France in pool play in the 2011 Rugby World Cup, but with a 2–2 record in pool play, were unable to achieve what would have been their first ever presence at the quarterfinals.

The Tonga national rugby sevens team participates occasionally in the World Rugby Sevens Series, although they are not one of the core teams. Tonga has participated in five Rugby World Cup Sevens, but has not qualified for the Summer Olympics.

== Domestic competition ==
The Datec Cup Provincial Championship is the highest level of rugby union competition within Tongan rugby and is a stepping stone for local players into international rugby union. Tongan Premier Cup teams include: Army (Ngaahi Koula), and Ma’ufanga Marist.

== See also ==
- Tonga national rugby union team
