= Samoa National Provincial Championship =

The National Provincial Championship is the highest level of domestic rugby union football competition within Samoan rugby and is a stepping stone for local players into international rugby union. Teams include Apia, Apia West, Aana, Fa'asaleleaga and Falealili.
