= Rugby union in Tonga =

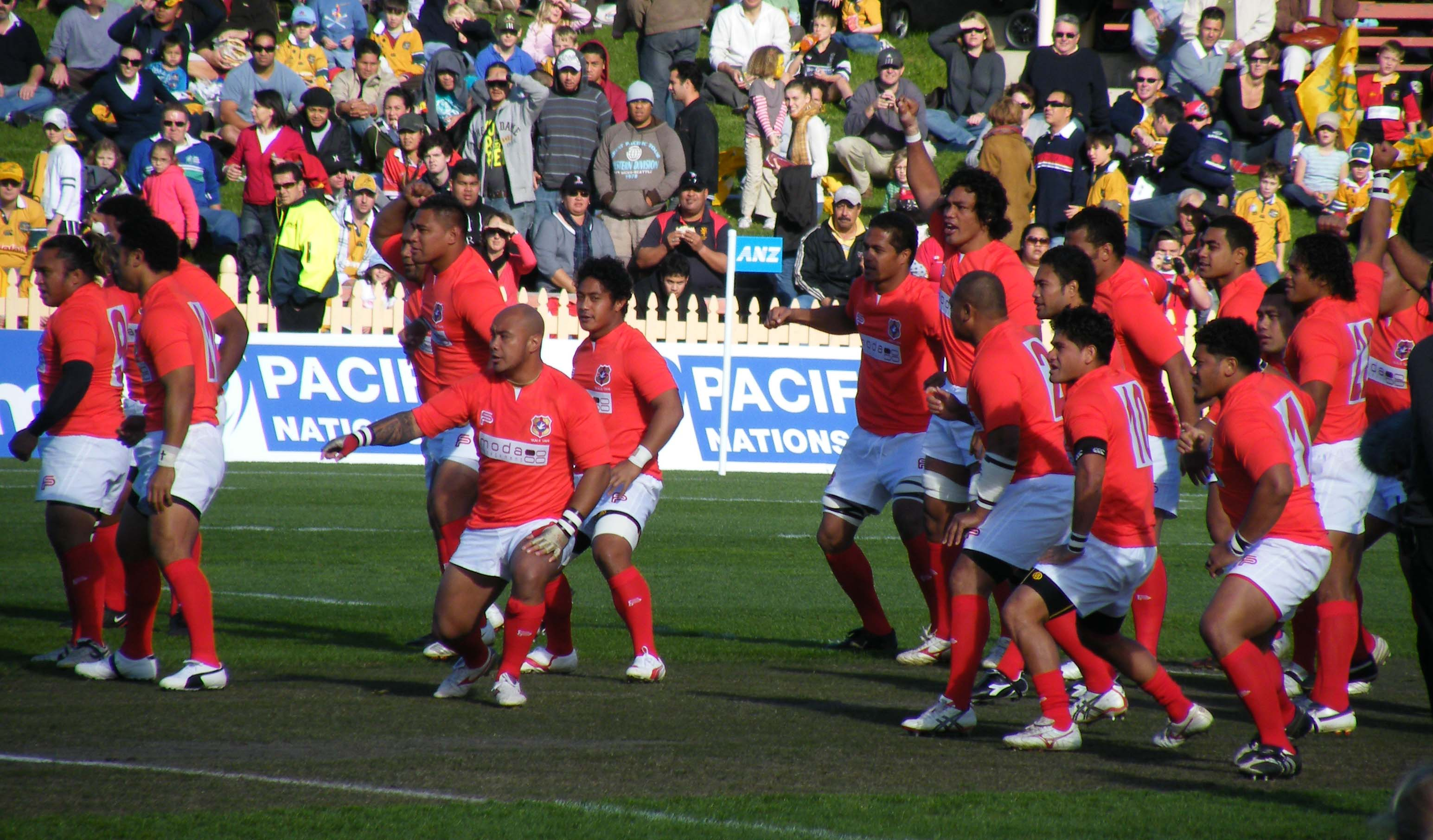
- The national team performing the sipi tau
- Country: Tonga
- Governing body: Tonga Rugby Union
- National team: Tonga
- Nickname: Ikale Tahi
- First played: Early 20th century
- Registered players: 6,891 (total); 3,049 (adult)
- Clubs: 82

National competitions
- Rugby World Cup; Pacific Nations Cup; Rugby World Cup Sevens; IRB Sevens World Series

Club competitions
- Pacific Rugby Cup; Datec Cup Provincial Championship

Rugby union is the national sport of Tonga. It is the most popular sport in the country. Tonga are considered to be a tier 2 rugby nation by the International Rugby Board.

Tonga has four main rugby playing islands, Vava'u (which produced players like Epi Taione), Ha'apai (which produced players like Jonah Lomu), ʻEua (which produced the Vunipola family, eight brothers who all played for the national team), and Tongatapu the major island in the Tonga island group.

== Governing body ==
Rugby union is governed by the Tonga Rugby Union who are also members of the Pacific Islands Rugby Alliance.

Tonga were awarded 'second tier' status by the International Rugby Board which entitles them to funding from the IRB. The TRFU was founded in 1923, and joined the IRB, in 1987.

== History ==
Rugby union was brought to the region in the early 20th century by sailors and missionaries. The main impetus for the establishment of rugby in Tonga came from the Irish missionaries in the 1920s, who introduced it to Tupou College and Tonga College. Since then, the main influence has been from New Zealand, as well as the neighbouring Pacific Islands of Samoa and Fiji, which not unlike Tonga perform far beyond their small population bases. Like Fiji and Samoa, they have a strong tendency towards rugby sevens, which suits their population and geography, and have performed well at the Hong Kong tournament.

The New Zealand connection, as for Samoa, has been a mixed blessing, since on the one hand it means that Tongans can play in a major field, but on the other hand, winning a cap for the All Blacks is a major ambition for many Tongans.

Notable Tongan players include:

- Viliami Ofahengaue, who played for Australia, Tongan born.

== Popularity ==
Rugby union is the national sport of Tonga and as in the rest of Polynesia is a way of life. Though Tongans are passionate rugby followers and players, their small population base means that much like its Pacific Island neighbours, Samoa and Fiji, Tonga has a limited yet talented player pool, and sometimes struggles with the resources and numbers of larger nations. Young talent often emigrates to or is poached by countries which offer greater prospects of individual success such as New Zealand, Australia and Europe. Nevertheless, all three countries perform far beyond their population base size.

The International Rugby Board (IRB) estimates that Tonga has a total of 800 registered senior players and twice as many juniors.

Rugby is popular in the nation's schools and students from schools such as Tonga College and Tupou College, are regularly offered scholarships from New Zealand, Australia and Japan.

Many players of Tongan descent e.g. Jonah Lomu, Israel Folau, Viliami "William" ʻOfahengaue, Malakai Fekitoa, Ben Afeaki, Charles Piutau, Frank Halai, Sekope Kepu, George Smith, Wycliff Palu, Sitaleki Timani, Salesi Ma'afu, Anthony and Saia Fainga'a, Mark Gerrard, Cooper Vuna, Doug Howlett, Toutai Kefu and Tatafu Polota-Nau have played for either the All Blacks or the Wallabies. British and Irish Lion and Welsh international player Taulupe "Toby" Faletau is Tongan born and the son of Tongan international Kuli Faletau. Taulupe's cousins and England international players Billy and Mako Vunipola (who is also a British and Irish Lion), are sons of former Tonga rugby captain Fe'ao Vunipola. Finau Maka, Telusa Veainu, Lopeti Timani, Charles Riechelmann and Pita Alatini are also of Tongan descent.

The money coming back from Tongan players playing rugby abroad is Tonga's second biggest export after squash.

== Women's rugby ==
The Tonga women's national rugby union team has played only two matches at the Women's Pacific Tri-Nations. Meanwhile, the Tonga women's national rugby sevens team has played at the 2010 and 2011 Asia-Pacific Championship, the Oceania Women's Sevens Championship since 2012, and the 2015 2015 Pacific Games.

In March 2018, the Ministry of Education announced to ban women's rugby in high schools, to "preserve the dignity of Tongan women and hold on to Tongan cultural values", but days later the Prime Minister reversed the decision.

== Competitions ==
=== Datec Cup Provincial Championship ===
This is the highest level of domestic competition within Tongan rugby union and is a stepping stone for local players into international rugby.

=== Pacific Rugby Cup ===
The IRB Pacific Rugby Cup started in 2006 and involves representative teams from the three Pacific rugby unions, Tonga along with Samoa and Fiji. Tonga's Tautahi Gold team won the tournament in 2008. The aim of the competition is to improve the quality of rugby in the Pacific Islands.

== National ==
The national team (Ikale Tahi) has performed quite well on the international stage.

Tonga beat Fiji 9-6 in their first test in 1924 played in the capital Nukuʻalofa.

1973 is arguably the high water mark of Tongan rugby, when they beat Australia 16-11.

Tonga has competed in six Rugby World Cups since 1987. Both the 2007 and 2011 Rugby World Cups were Tonga's most successful to date, both winning two out of four matches and both in a running chance for the quarter-finals. In the 2007 Rugby World Cup, Tonga won its first two matches, against the USA 25–15, and Samoa 19–15; and came very close to upsetting the eventual winners of the 2007 tournament, the South African Springboks, losing 30–25. A loss to England, 36–20 in their last pool game ended their hopes of making the knockout stages. Nevertheless, by picking up third place in their pool games behind South Africa and England, Tonga earned automatic qualification for the 2011 Rugby World Cup in New Zealand.

In Pool A of the 2011 Rugby World Cup, Tonga beat both Japan 31-18, and the 5th ranked eventual finalist France 19-14 in the latter pool stages. However, a previous heavy defeat to the All Blacks at the tournament's opener (41-10) and a subsequent tight loss to Canada (25-20) meant that Tonga lost out to France (who also lost to NZ) for the quarter-finals due to 2 bonus points and a points difference of 46. Tonga's best results prior to 2007 came in 1995, when they beat Ivory Coast 29–11, and 1999 when they beat Italy 28–25 (although with only 14 men they lost heavily to England, 101–10). Tonga emerged victoryless in the 1987 and 2003 Rugby World Cups, and did not qualify for the 1991 Rugby World Cup.

Tonga used to compete in the Pacific Tri-Nations against Samoa and Fiji, which has now been replaced by the IRB Pacific Nations Cup, which now also involves Japan, Canada, and the United States. At club level, there are the Datec Cup Provincial Championship and the Pacific Rugby Cup. Rugby union is governed by the Tonga Rugby Football Union, which was also a member of the Pacific Islands Rugby Alliance, and contributed to the Pacific Islanders rugby union team, before both were disbanded in 2009.

Tonga performs the Kailao (Sipi Tau) before its matches.

=== Pacific Tri-Nations ===
The Pacific Tri-Nations was a series between Tonga, Fiji and Samoa. It had been played from 1982 to 2006.

=== IRB Pacific Nations Cup ===
The IRB Pacific Nations Cup (formerly the Pacific 5 Nations, Pacific Tri-Nations) is a competition held between six Pacific Rim sides; Japan, Fiji, Canada, Tonga, Samoa, and the United States.

== See also ==
- Culture of Tonga
