= Lawaqa Park =

Rugby union stadium in Fiji

- Interactive map of Lawaqa Park
- Location: Sigatoka, Fiji
- Coordinates: 18°8′33″S 177°30′7″E
- Capacity: 12,000
- Type: Multi-use

Construction
- Opened: 1998

Lawaqa Park is a rugby union stadium in Sigatoka, Fiji. The stadium has a nominal capacity of 12,000 people. It currently hosts rugby union matches as well as local football matches. The stadium was upgraded in 2015 with a redevelopment project that costed 2.1 million Fijian dollars. It hosted the 2019 Nadroga 10's Provincial Rugby Union competition.

Lawaqa Park is the home stadium of Nadroga F.C., which plays in the Fiji Premier League.
