= Rugby Samoa =

Samoan rugby union governing body

Lakapi Samoa
- Sport: Rugby union
- Founded: 1924; 102 years ago
- World Rugby affiliation: 1988
- President: Tuila'epa Sa'ilele Malielegaoi
- Men's coach: Seilala Mapusua
- Website: http://www.lakapisamoa.com

Rugby Samoa (Samoan: Lakapi Samoa) is the governing body of the sport of rugby union in Samoa. Founded as the Apia Rugby Union in 1924, it was affiliated to the New Zealand Rugby Football Union the same year. It joined the International Rugby Board as the Western Samoa Rugby Football Union in 1988. In 1997, when Western Samoa amended its constitution to change the country's name from Western Samoa to Samoa, the union also changed its name, and dropped the word football to become the Samoa Rugby Union. In November 2020, they changed their name to Lakapi Samoa which is Samoan for Rugby Samoa. They were formerly members of the Pacific Islands Rugby Alliance (PIRA) along with Fiji and Tonga. The union is also a member of the Federation of Oceania Rugby Unions (FORU).

There are 12 provincial unions made up of around 120 clubs and boasting nearly 5,000 senior and twice as many junior players in a country with a population of just under 175,000 people.

The main domestic tournament is the Samoa National Provincial Championship.

In March, 2026 Tuilaʻepa Saʻilele Malielegaoi has stepped down as Lakapi Samoa chairman.

== National teams ==
The Samoa national rugby union team perform a traditional Samoan challenge called the siva tau before each game. Samoa Rugby Union were formerly members of the Pacific Islands Rugby Alliance (PIRA) along with Fiji and Tonga.

The Samoa national rugby sevens team competes in the annual World Rugby Sevens Series, and won the 2009–10 World Series. Samoa were crowned winners of the 2010 Edinburgh Sevens. The historic victory followed three consecutive tournament wins in the world series, the Hong Kong Sevens, the USA Sevens and the Adelaide Sevens.

== Financial problems ==
In November 2017, Samoa's prime minister and union chairman Tuilaepa Lupesoliai Sailele Malielegaoi announced that the organisation was bankrupt, although those claims were denied by world governing body World Rugby.
