= Apia Park =

Multi-function sports complex located in Apia, Samoa

- Interactive map of Apia Park
- Location: Apia, Samoa
- Coordinates: 13°50′12″S 171°45′7″W
- Capacity: 12,000

Construction
- Groundbreaking: 1924
- Renovated: 2015

Tenant
- Samoa national rugby union team

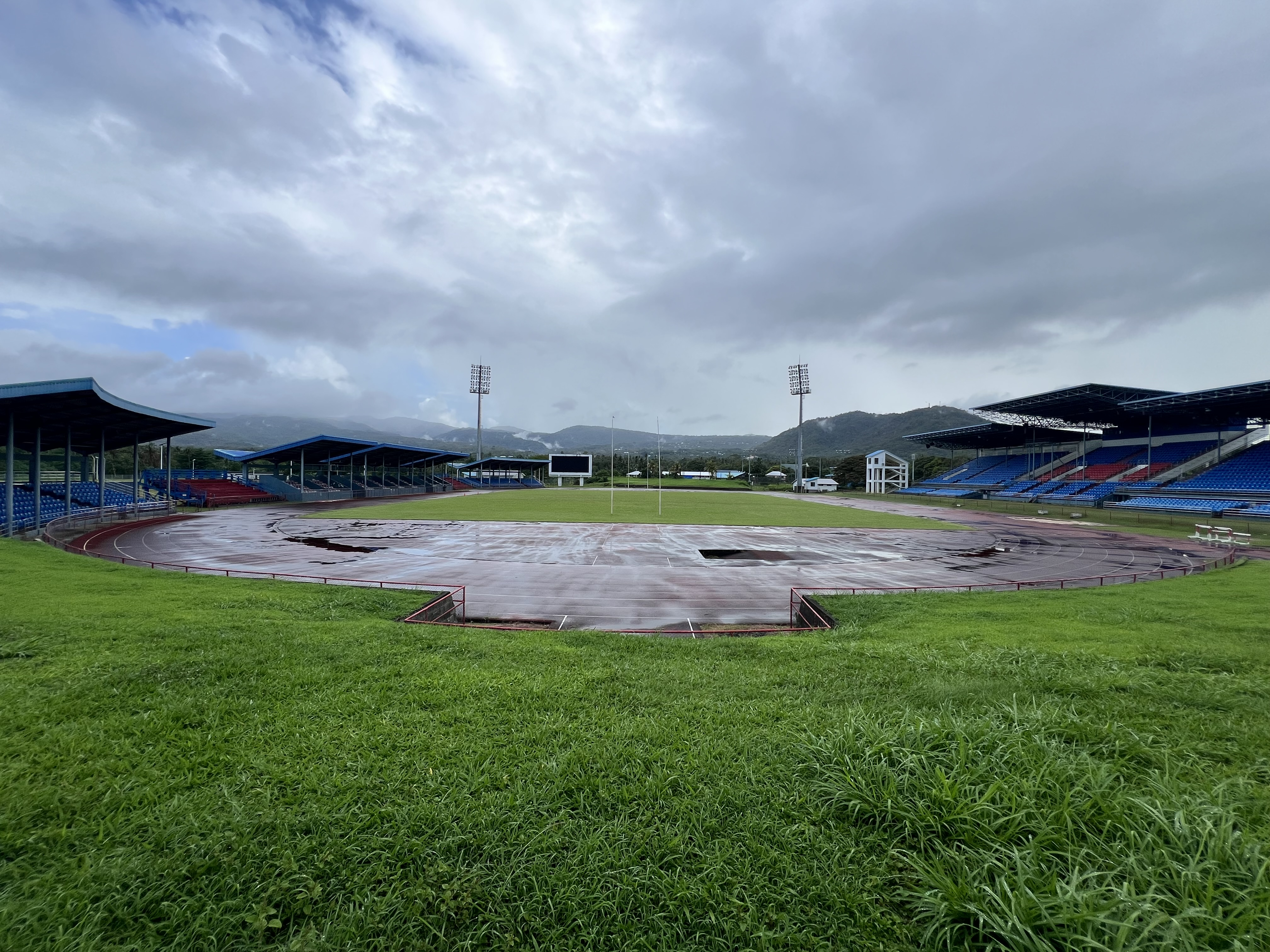
Apia Park rugby stadium as seen from the north stand

Apia Park is a multi-function sports complex located in Apia, the capital of Samoa. Primarily used for rugby union events, Apia Park is the home stadium of the Samoa national rugby union team, Manu Samoa. It is also a venue for association football. Manuma Samoa use the venue for rugby union matches.

== Facilities ==
The venue consists of a stadium with a capacity of 12,000, a gymnasium, as well as tennis and netball courts.

The Island of Savai'i however calls the Prince Edwards Park, Lalomalava their home stadium.

== History ==
The ground was opened in 1924 in and the first sporting event hosted was the rugby match against Fiji. In 2015, the main stadium area underwent a multi-million tālā facelift by Shanghai Construction Group for the historic match against the All Blacks as part of both teams' preparations for the upcoming World Cup.

== Events and competitions ==
In 2007, Apia Park was one of the main venues for the 2007 Pacific Games, hosting the athletics, table tennis, badminton, lawn bowls, rugby sevens and touch rugby events. The Park will be put to use again for an international event when it hosts the opening and closing ceremonies for the 2015 Commonwealth Youth Games, as well as the Games' athletics, rugby league and tennis competitions. The park hosted a test-match between Samoa and Fiji on 8 October 2016, marking the 30th anniversary of rugby league in Samoa. In 2017 Blues and Reds will play a regular season game of Super Rugby for the first time ever.

Moana Pasifika, an Auckland based rugby union team composed of players from around the Pacific, will play a 2023 Super Rugby Pacific home game at Apia Park against the Queensland Reds.

== See also ==
- List of rugby league stadiums by capacity
