= Datec Cup Provincial Championship =

Tongan rugby union competition

The Datec Cup Provincial Championship is the highest level of rugby union football competition within Tongan rugby and is a stepping stone for local players into international rugby union.

Tongan Premier Cup teams include Army (Ngaahi Koula) and Ma’ufanga Marist.
