= Teufaiva Sport Stadium =

Sports venue in Nukuʻalofa, Tonga

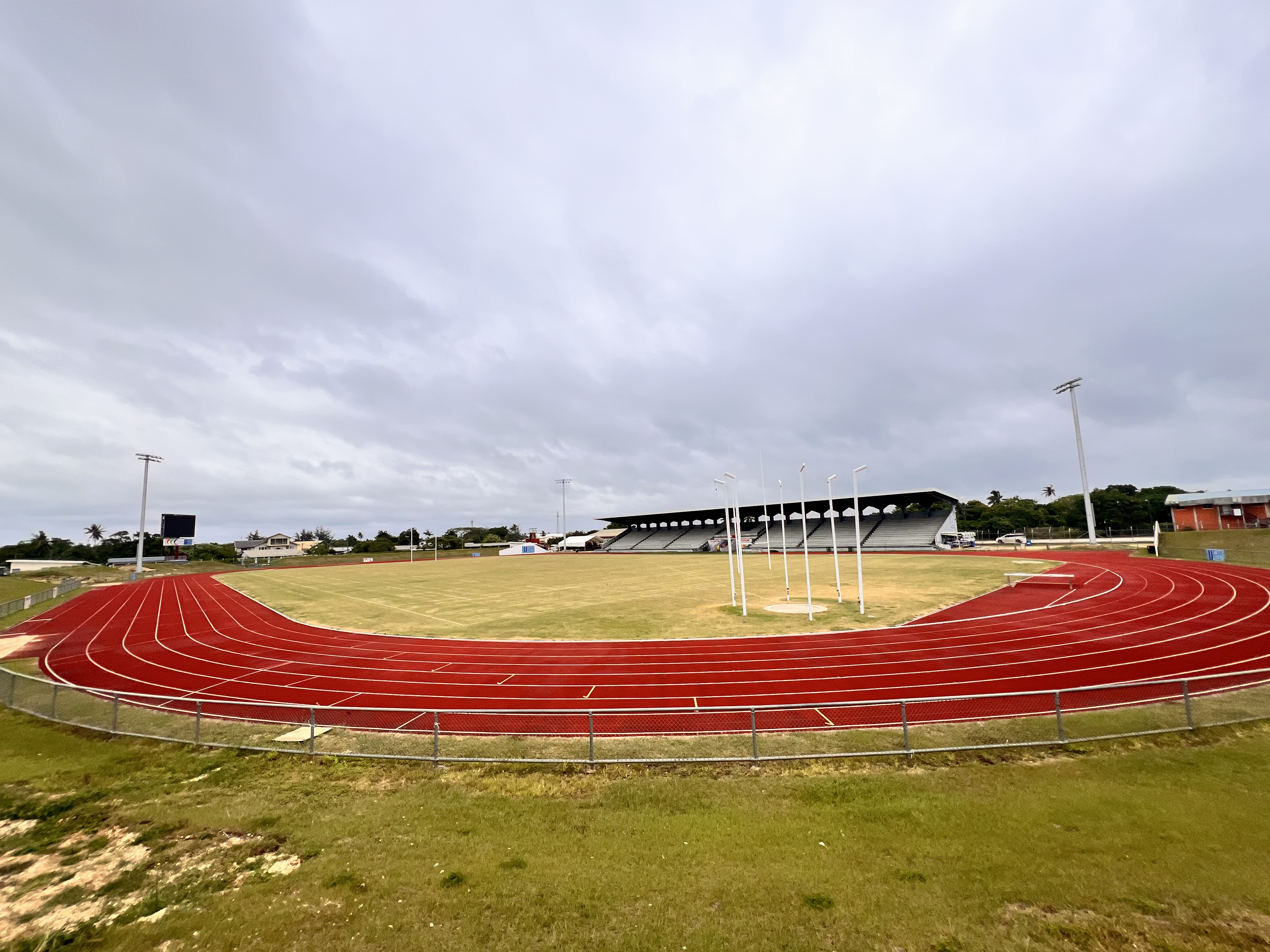
- Stadium in November 2025
- Interactive map of Teufaiva Sport Stadium
- Former names: Tenefaira Field Stadium
- Location: Nuku'Alofa, Tongatapu, Tonga
- Coordinates: 21°8′29″S 175°12′26.6″W
- Capacity: 10,000
- Surface: Grass

Tenants
- Tonga national football team Tonga national rugby union team Moana Pasifika (Super Rugby) (2024–present); Nukuhetulu FC (selected matches)

Teufaiva Sport Stadium which was previously known as Tenefaira Field Stadium is a multi-purpose stadium in Nukuʻalofa, Tonga. It is used mostly for rugby union, football and rugby league and the Ikale Tahi team matches. The stadium holds 10,000 people. It is the home ground of the Tonga national rugby union team. Teufaiva is where the Secondary School sports in Tonga are held (every year).

The stadium fell into disrepair in the early 2000s and was unused for eight years. It was reopened after being refurbished in 2017, but badly damaged by Cyclone Gita just a few months later. It was re-opened again in 2019.

On the 4th of May 2024, Moana Pasifika, from the Super Rugby Pacific competition hosted their first game at the stadium against the Highlanders (Dunedin, New Zealand). The Highlanders won 28-17 in wet conditions. This made Tonga the 12th country to host a Super Rugby match.
