= 2020 Major League Rugby season =

Third season of Major League Rugby

- Countries: United States (11 teams); Canada (1 team)
- Date: February 8 – March 8 (canceled)
- Champions: Not awarded
- Matches played: 30
- Tries scored: 188 (average 6.3 per match)

Official website
- majorleague.rugby

The 2020 Major League Rugby season was the third season of Major League Rugby, the professional rugby union competition sanctioned by USA Rugby. The regular season schedule was released on September 23, 2019, and began on February 8, 2020.

Three teams made their debut in 2020: the New England Free Jacks, Old Glory DC, and Rugby ATL. The Seattle Seawolves were the defending champions, having won their second consecutive title from the previous year.

On March 12, 2020, MLR announced the season would go on hiatus immediately for 30 days due to increasing local social distancing restrictions amidst the COVID-19 pandemic. One week later, MLR announced that the season was officially cancelled.

== Teams and format ==
With three additional teams for the 2020 season, Major League Rugby moved to a two-conference format. For the regular season, each team was to play against the other teams in their conference twice and against every team in the opposite conference once, for a total of 16 games.

The playoffs expanded from four teams in 2019 to six teams in 2020, with the top three teams from each conference qualifying. The second- and third-placed team from each conference were to play each other in the conference semifinals, with the winner moving on to play the first-placed team in the conference finals. The winners of the conference finals would have to play against each other in the final for the championship.

Locations of teams in Major League Rugby
Western Conference Eastern Conference

Conference	Club	Metro area	Stadium	Capacity	Coach	Captain
Western Conference	Austin Gilgronis	Austin, Texas	Bold Stadium	5,000	(New Zealand) Brent Semmons	(United States) Zinzan Elan-Puttick
Western Conference	Colorado Raptors	Denver, Colorado	Infinity Park (Note: Infinity Park is in Glendale, Colorado, a home rule municipality in the Denver metropolitan area.)	5,000	(New Zealand) Peter Borlase	(Australia) Luke White
Western Conference	Houston SaberCats	Houston, Texas	Aveva Stadium	4,000	(Australia) Paul Healy	(Australia) De Wet Roos
Western Conference	San Diego Legion	San Diego, California	Torero Stadium	6,000	(England) Rob Hoadley	(United States) Nate Augspurger
Western Conference	Seattle Seawolves	Seattle, Washington	Starfire Stadium (Note: Starfire Stadium is in the Seattle suburb of Tukwila, Washington.)	4,500	(Namibia) Kees Lensing	(United States) Riekert Hattingh
Western Conference	Utah Warriors	Salt Lake City, Utah	Zions Bank Stadium	5,000	(Australia) Chris Latham	(Samoa) Dwayne Polataivao
Eastern Conference	New England Free Jacks	Boston, Massachusetts	Union Point Sports Complex	2,000	(United States) Josh Smith	(Canada) Josh Larsen
Eastern Conference	New Orleans Gold	New Orleans, Louisiana	Gold Mine	10,000	(Australia) Nate Osborne	(Canada) Kyle Baillie
Eastern Conference	Old Glory DC	Washington, D.C.	Cardinal Stadium	3,500	(New Zealand) Andrew Douglas	(United States) Thretton Palamo
Eastern Conference	Rugby United New York	New York, New York	Maimonides Park	7,000	(Republic of Ireland) Greg McWilliams	(United States) Dylan Fawsitt
Eastern Conference	Rugby ATL	Atlanta, Georgia	Lupo Family Field (Note: Lupo Family Field is in the Atlanta suburb of Marietta, Georgia.)	2,500	(United States) Scott Lawrence	(South Africa) Ryan Nell
Eastern Conference	Toronto Arrows	Toronto, Ontario	Alumni Field; Lamport Stadium	2,500; 9,600	(Canada) Chris Silverthorn	(Canada) Dan Moor

== Regular season ==
=== Standings ===
Season Standings
Western Conference
Pos	Team	P	W	D	L	PF	PA	PD	TF	TA	TB	LB	Pts
1	San Diego Legion	5	5	0	0	161	108	+53	21	13	3	0	23
2	Utah Warriors	5	2	1	2	125	134	-9	15	18	2	0	12
3	Colorado Raptors	5	2	0	3	98	130	-32	11	16	0	1	9
4	Seattle Seawolves	5	1	0	4	138	162	-24	15	22	2	2	8
5	Austin Gilgronis	5	1	1	3	104	155	-51	13	19	1	0	7
6	Houston SaberCats	5	1	0	4	99	116	-17	11	12	0	2	6
Eastern Conference
Pos	Team	P	W	D	L	PF	PA	PD	TF	TA	TB	LB	Pts
1	Toronto Arrows	5	4	0	1	151	89	+62	16	10	2	1	19
2	Old Glory DC	5	4	0	1	122	129	-7	13	15	1	0	17
3	New Orleans Gold	5	3	0	2	135	102	+33	19	13	3	1	16
4	Rugby United New York	5	3	0	2	136	131	+5	18	17	2	1	15
5	Rugby ATL	5	2	0	3	116	119	+6	14	12	2	2	12
6	New England Free Jacks	5	1	0	4	139	158	-19	22	20	4	1	9
If teams are level at any stage, tiebreakers are applied in the following order: 1. number of matches won 2. the difference between points for and points against 3. the number of tries scored 4. the most points scored 5. the difference between tries for and tries against 6. the fewest red cards received 7. the fewest yellow cards received
Green background indicates teams in position for the Conference Finals; Blue background indicates teams in position for the Conference Semi-Finals (CH) Champions. (RU) Runners-up. (SF) Losing semi-finalists. Last Updated: March 7, 2020

=== Matches ===
The following are the matches for the 2020 Major League Rugby regular season:

Home \ Away	AUS	COL	HOU	NEFJ	NOLA	OGDC	RATL	RUNY	SAN	SEA	TOR	UTA
Austin Gilgronis		~~May 17~~	~~Apr 26~~			19–28	~~Mar 28~~		~~Mar 14~~	~~Apr 4~~	10–38	20–20
Colorado Raptors	~~Mar 21~~		~~Apr 18~~		20–27		~~May 2~~		~~May 30~~	~~May 23~~	22–19	22–14
Houston SaberCats	20–24	21–12				13–22	~~May 23~~	23–31	~~May 16~~	~~May 2~~		~~Apr 11~~
New England Free Jacks	~~May 9~~	~~Apr 4~~	~~Mar 14~~		~~Apr 25~~	~~Apr 18~~	~~May 30~~	34–14			~~May 16~~	
New Orleans Gold	~~May 23~~		~~May 9~~	31–22		46–13	10–22	~~Apr 18~~	21–25		~~Mar 28~~	
Old Glory DC		~~Mar 15~~		~~May 24~~	~~Apr 11~~		31–29	~~Mar 29~~		28–22	~~Apr 26~~	~~May 3~~
Rugby ATL				~~Mar 22~~	~~Apr 5~~	~~May 17~~		19–22	~~Apr 26~~	~~May 10~~	18–28	28–19
Rugby United NY	49–31	~~Apr 25~~		~~May 1~~	~~May 30~~	~~May 9~~	~~Apr 10~~			~~Mar 14~~	~~Mar 22~~	
San Diego Legion	~~May 3~~	49–22	~~Apr 5~~	30–21		~~Mar 22~~		24–20		33–24		~~May 25~~
Seattle Seawolves	~~May 31~~	~~Mar 29~~	~~Mar 21~~	44–29	~~May 17~~				~~Apr 12~~		17–39	31–33
Toronto Arrows			27–22	~~Apr 12~~	~~May 3~~	~~May 31~~	~~Apr 19~~	~~May 22~~	~~May 10~~			~~Apr 4~~
Utah Warriors	~~Apr 18~~	~~May 9~~	~~May 30~~	39–33	~~Mar 14~~			~~May 16~~	~~Mar 28~~	~~Apr 25~~		

Updated to match(es) played on March 8, 2020
Colors: Blue: home team win; Yellow: draw; Red: away team win.

=== Scheduled completed ===
==== Week 1 (Feb 8–9) ====
Feb 8	Houston SaberCats	21–12	Colorado Raptors	Aveva Stadium
11:00 CST	Try: Sam Windsor 19'; Adriaan Booysen 40'; Malacchi Esdale 64'; Con: Sam Windsor (0/3); Pen: Sam Windsor (2/2) 7', 78'	report	Try: John Ryberg 29'; Con: Tomas Quinlan (0/1); Pen: Tomas Quinlan (0/1); Cards: Brendan Daly (yellow card) 39'	Referee: Scott Green (USAR)

Feb 8	NOLA Gold	46–13	Old Glory DC	Gold Mine
15:00 CST	Try: Cam Dolan 12', 53', 73'; Malcolm May 22'; Moni Tonga'uiha 34', 41'; Julián Domínguez 57'; Con: Carl Meyer (4/7) 13', 23', 42', 54'; Pen: Carl Meyer (1/1) 40'; Cards: Malcolm May (yellow card) 25'; Lindsay Stevens (yellow card) 60'; Nikola Bursic (yellow card) 75'	report	Try: Doug Fraser 30'; Mike Dabulas 79'; Con: Jason Robertson (0/2); Pen: Jason Robertson (1/1) 26'; Cards: Gordon Fullerton (yellow card) 22'	Referee: Luke Rogan (USAR)

Feb 9	Rugby ATL	28–19	Utah Warriors	Life University Running Eagles Stadium
15:00 EST	Try: Matt Heaton 31'; Ross Deacon 56'; Marno Redelinghuys 63'; Duncan Van Schalkwyk 67'; Con: Duncan Van Schalkwyk (0/2); Kurt Coleman (1/2) 64'; Pen: Duncan Van Schalkwyk (1/1) 14'; Kurt Coleman (1/1) 80'	report	Try: Blake Hohaia 21'; Con: Hagen Schulte (1/1) 22'; Pen: Hagen Schulte (4/4) 3', 11', 16', 46'; Cards: Saia Uhila (yellow card) 55'	Referee: Derek Summers (USAR)

Feb 9	New England Free Jacks	34–14	Rugby United New York	Sam Boyd Stadium, Whitney, Nevada
13:00 PST	Try: Mitch Wilson 6'; Brad Hemopo 11'; Beaudein Waaka 25', 55'; Liam Steel 65'; Con: Tadhg Leader (2/3) 12', 26'; Beaudein Waaka (1/2) 66'; Pen: Tadhg Leader (1/1) 16'; Cards: Josh Larsen (yellow card) 21'	report	Try: Kyle Sumsion 23', 75'; Con: Cathal Marsh 24', 76'; Cards: Ben Foden (yellow card) 52'	Referee: Chris Assmus (RC)

Feb 9	San Diego Legion	33–24	Seattle Seawolves	Torero Stadium
14:00 PST	Try: Dean Muir 17', 38'; JP du Plessis 22'; Save Totovosau 42'; Jasa Veremalua 53'; Con: Luke Burton (4/5) 23', 39', 43', 54'; Cards: Peter Malcolm (yellow card) 66'	report	Try: Riekert Hattingh 13'; Vili Tolutaʻu 58'; George Barton 66'; Con: Brock Staller (1/1) 14'; Scott Dean (2/2) 59', 67'; Pen: Brock Staller (1/2) 6'; Cards: Vili Tolutaʻu (yellow card) 74'	Referee: Jamie Nutbrown (NZR)

Feb 9	Austin Gilgronis	10–38	Toronto Arrows	Circuit of the Americas
19:00 CST	Try: Chris Schade 59'; Con: Marcelo Torrealba (1/1) 60'; Pen: Marcelo Torrealba (1/1) 9'; Cards: Lino Saunitoga (yellow card) 17'; Potu Leavasa (yellow card) 79'	report	Try: Manuel Diana 1'; Penalty Try 14'; Dan Moor 27'; Jamie Mackenzie 49'; Peter Milazzo 78'; Con: Sam Malcolm (3/3) 2', 28', 50'; Tayler Adams 79'; Pen: Sam Malcolm (1/2) 25'	Referee: Lex Weiner (USAR)

==== Week 2 (Feb 15–16) ====
Feb 15	Utah Warriors	39–33	New England Free Jacks	Sam Boyd Stadium, Whitney, Nevada
11:30 PST	Try: Fetuʻu Vainikolo 29'; Dwayne Polataivao 53'; Hagen Schulte 61'; Saia Uhila 69'; Michael Baska 76'; Con: Hagen Schulte (4/5) 30', 62', 70', 77'; Pen: Hagen Schulte (2/2) 10', 26'	Report	Try: Deion Mikesell 15', 46'; Josh Larsen 36'; Poasa Waqanibau 42'; Mitch Wilson 79'; Con: Timothée Guillimin (4/5) 37', 43', 47', 80'; Cards: Brad Hemopo (yellow card) 49'; Poasa Waqanibau (yellow card) 59'	Referee: Scott Green (USAR)

Feb 15	Rugby United New York	49–31	Austin Gilgronis	Sam Boyd Stadium, Whitney, Nevada
15:30 PST	Try: Mathieu Bastareaud 4'; Cathal Marsh 17'; Troy Lockyear 33', 48'; Dylan Fawsitt 39'; Julio Giraldo 60'; Kyle Sumsion 77'; Con: Cathal Marsh (5/5) 5', 18', 34', 40', 49'; Harry Bennett (2/2) 61', 78'; Cards: Anthony Parry (yellow card) 62'	Report	Try: Dominic Akina 24'; Mason Pedersen 56'; Zinzan Elan-Puttick 63'; Gabriel Farley 65'; Con: Marcelo Torrealba (4/4) 25', 57', 64', 66'; Pen: Marcelo Torrealba (1/1) 27'; Cards: Sione Fangaiuiha (yellow card) 32'; Maikeli Mudu (yellow card) 38'	Referee: Luke Rogan (USAR)

Feb 16	Toronto Arrows	27–22	Houston SaberCats	Sam Boyd Stadium, Whitney, Nevada
11:30 PST	Try: Giuseppe du Toit 12'; Manuel Diana 15'; Dan Moor 33'; Con: Sam Malcolm (3/3) 13', 15'. 34'; Pen: Sam Malcolm (1/1) 3'; Tayler Adams (1/1) 66'; Cards: Tomás de la Vega (yellow card) 75'; Mike Sheppard (red card) 80'	Report	Try: De Wet Roos 17', 77'; Diego Fortuny 46'; Con: Sam Windsor (2/3) 47', 78'; Pen: Sam Windsor (1/1) 55'; Cards: Tiaan Loots (yellow card) 28'	Referee: Jamie Nutbrown (NZR)

Feb 16	Old Glory DC	28–22	Seattle Seawolves	Cardinal Stadium
15:00 EST	Try: Jason Robertson 3', 77'; Doug Fraser 28'; Renata Roberts-Tenana 59'; Con: Jason Robertson (1/4) 60'; Pen: Jason Robertson (2/2) 8', 52'	Report	Try: Riekert Hattingh 44'; Con: Brock Staller (1/1) 45'; Pen: Brock Staller (5/5) 11', 15', 39', 43', 55'; Cards: Nakai Penny (yellow card) 51'	Attendance: 2,850; Referee: Lex Weiner (USAR)

Feb 16	NOLA Gold	10–22	Rugby ATL	Gold Mine
17:00 CST	Try: Lindsay Stevens 18'; Con: Carl Meyer (1/1) 19'; Pen: Carl Meyer (1/1) 57'; Cards: Kevin O'Connor (yellow card) 3'; Tim Maupin (yellow card) 49'	Report	Try: Jeremy Misailegalu 28'; Rory van Vugt 79'; Con: Kurt Coleman (0/2); Pen: Kurt Coleman (4/5) 49', 53', 66', 74'	Referee: Henrique Platais (CBRu)

Feb 16	San Diego Legion	49–22	Colorado Raptors	Sam Boyd Stadium, Whitney, Nevada
15:00 PST	Try: Penalty try 14'; Dylan Audsley 20'; Ma'a Nonu 29'; Dean Muir 35'; Nate Augspurger 67'; JP du Plessis 70'; Con: Luke Burton (4/5) 21', 30', 36', 68'; Pen: Luke Burton (3/3) 4', 59', 62'; Cards: JP du Plessis (yellow card) 77'	Report	Try: Mason Emerson 7'; Nick Boyer 40'; Mika Kruse 49'; Con: Tomas Quinlan (2/3) 40', 50'; Pen: Tomas Quinlan (1/1) 19'; Cards: Kelepi Fifita (yellow card) 11'	Referee: Derek Summers (USAR)

==== Week 3 (Feb 22–23) ====
Feb 22	Colorado Raptors	20–27	NOLA Gold	Infinity Park
16:00 MST	Try: Nick Boyer 16'; John Ryberg 68'; Con: Tomas Quinlan (2/2) 17', 69'; Pen: Tomas Quinlan (2/2) 28', 33'	Report	Try: Eric Howard 4'; Julián Domínguez 8'; Carl Meyer 44', 62'; Con: Carl Meyer (2/4) 5', 9'; Pen: Carl Meyer (1/1) 59'; Cards: Holden Yungert (yellow card) 64'	Referee: Lex Weiner (USAR)

Feb 22	Austin Gilgronis	20–20	Utah Warriors	Circuit of the Americas
19:00 CST	Try: Tiaan Erasmus 44'; Frank Halai 51'; Con: Marcelo Torrealba (2/2) 45', 52'; Pen: Marcelo Torrealba (2/2) 7', 65'; Cards: Jamie Mackintosh (yellow card) 15'	Report	Try: Dwayne Polataivao 20'; Kalolo Tuiloma 80'; Con: Hagen Schulte (2/2) 21', 80'; Pen: Hagen Schulte (2/2) 40', 60'	Referee: Mike O'Brien (USAR)

Feb 22	Houston SaberCats	13–22	Old Glory DC	Aveva Stadium
19:00 CST	Try: Tiaan Loots 11'; Con: Sam Windsor (1/1) 12'; Pen: Sam Windsor (2/2) 26', 30'; Cards: Diego Magno (yellow card) 78'	Report	Try: Mungo Mason 22'; Con: Jason Robertson (1/1) 23'; Pen: Jason Robertson (5/5) 9', 15', 43', 71', 79'; Cards: Renata Roberts-Tenana (yellow card) 65'	Referee: Derek Summers (USAR)

Feb 22	Seattle Seawolves	17–39	Toronto Arrows	Starfire Sports Complex
19:00 PST	Try: Mathew Turner 25'; Riekert Hattingh 78'; Con: Brock Staller (1/1) 26'; Scott Dean (1/1) 79'; Pen: Brock Staller (1/1) 43'	Report	Try: Dan Moor 33', 80'; Lucas Rumball 60'; Con: Sam Malcolm (3/3) 34', 60', 80'; Pen: Sam Malcolm (6/6) 4', 29', 50', 54', 57', 67'; Cards: Manuel Diana (yellow card) 22'	Referee: Scott Green (USAR)

Feb 23	Rugby ATL	19–22	Rugby United New York	Life University Running Eagles Stadium
15:00 EST	Try: Duncan Van Schalkwyk 13', 80'; Johan Momson 52'; Con: Kurt Coleman (2/2) 14', 53'; Martini Talapusi (0/1)	Report	Try: Ben Foden 17'; James Denise 23'; Mark O'Keeffe 38'; Con: Cathal Marsh (2/3) 24', 39'; Pen: Harry Bennett (0/1); Cathal Marsh (1/1) 74'; Cards: Paddy Ryan (yellow card) 52'	Referee: Jamie Nutbrown (NZR)

Feb 23	San Diego Legion	30–21	New England Free Jacks	Torero Stadium
16:00 PST	Try: Save Totovosau 8'; Tira Patterson 17'; Dylan Audsley 35'; Devereaux Ferris 69'; Con: Luke Burton (2/4) 9', 70'; Pen: Luke Burton (2/2) 5', 75'	Report	Try: Poasa Waqanibau 30'; John Poland 44'; Zach Stryffeler 66'; Con: Timothée Guillimin (3/3) 31', 45', 67'; Pen: Timothée Guillimin (0/2)	Referee: Luke Rogan (USAR)

==== Week 4 (Feb 29 – Mar 1) ====
Feb 29	NOLA Gold	21–25	San Diego Legion	Gold Mine
15:00 CST	Try: Moni Tonga’uiha 6'; Dino Waldren 28'; Robbie Coleman 40'; Con: Carl Meyer (2/2) 7', 29'; JP Eloff (1/1) 40'; Pen: JP Eloff (0/1); Cards: Carl Meyer (yellow card) 32'	Report	Try: Ma'a Nonu 10', 60'; Keni Nasoqeqe 35'; Con: Luke Burton (1/2) 11'; Joe Pietersen (1/1) 61'; Pen: Luke Burton (0/1); Joe Pietersen (2/2) 65', 79'; Cards: Joshua Furno (yellow card) 25'	Referee: Scott Green (USAR)

Feb 29	Austin Gilgronis	19–28	Old Glory DC	Toyota Field
15:00 CST	Try: Penalty try 39'; Tiaan Erasmus 54'; Frank Halai 72'; Con: Marcelo Torrealba (1/2) 55'	Report	Try: Danny Tusitala 8'; Doug Fraser 24'; Renata Roberts-Tenana 78'; Con: Jason Robertson (2/3) 9', 25'; Pen: Jason Robertson (3/3) 4', 22', 40'; Cards: Will Vakalahi (yellow card) 37'	Referee: Moe Chaudhry (RC)

Feb 29	Colorado Raptors	22–14	Utah Warriors	Infinity Park
16:00 MST	Try: Rene Ranger 29', 59'; Mason Emerson 77'; Con: Robbie Petzer (2/3) 60', 78'; Pen: Robbie Petzer (1/2) 13'	Report	Try: Huluholo Moungaloa 75'; Saia Uhila 80'; Con: Robbie Povey (2/2) 76', 80'; Pen: Robbie Povey (0/2)	Referee: Jamie Nutbrown (NZR)

Feb 29	Seattle Seawolves	44–29	New England Free Jacks	Starfire Sports Complex
22:00 EST	Try: Peter Tiberio 21'; Juan-Philip Smith 35', 43'; Nakai Penny 38', 78'; Con: Ben Cima (5/5) 22', 36', 39', 44', 79'; Pen: Ben Cima (3/3) 53', 62', 72'	Report	Try: Donald Brighouse 5'; Danny Collins 16'; Josh Larsen 28'; John Poland 56'; Steven Hinshaw 68'; Con: Timothée Guillimin (2/5) 6', 17'; Pen: Timothée Guillimin (0/1); Cards: Poasa Waqanibau (yellow card) 49'	Referee: Derek Summers (USAR)

Mar 1	Rugby ATL	18–28	Toronto Arrows	Life University Running Eagles Stadium
15:00 EST	Try: Alex Maughan 39'; Neethling Gericke 70'; Con: Kurt Coleman (1/2) 71'; Pen: Kurt Coleman (2/2) 19', 32'; Cards: Neethling Gericke (yellow card) 76'	Report	Try: Leandro Leivas 14', 62'; Tomás de la Vega 56'; Gastón Mieres 80'; Con: Sam Malcolm (2/2) 15', 57'; Tayler Adams (2/2) 63', 80'; Pen: Tayler Adams (0/1); Cards: Andrew Ferguson (yellow card) 69'	Referee: Luke Rogan (USAR)

Mar 1	Houston SaberCats	23–31	Rugby United New York	AVEVA Stadium
17:00 CST	Try: Sam Windsor 57'; Taylor Howden 70'; Con: Sam Windsor (2/2) 58', 71'; Pen: Sam Windsor (3/3) 25', 42', 51'	Report	Try: Dylan Fawsitt 8'; Chris Mattina 18'; Paddy Ryan 29'; Marcus Walsh 79'; Con: Cathal Marsh (4/4) 9', 19', 30', 80'; Pen: Cathal Marsh (1/1) 45'	Referee: Henrique Platais (CBRu)

==== Week 5 (Mar 6–8) ====
Mar 6	Colorado Raptors	22–19	Toronto Arrows	Infinity Park
18:00 MST	Try: John Ryberg 21'; Mika Kruse 41'; Con: Robbie Petzer (0/2); Pen: Robbie Petzer (4/4) 5', 16', 40', 76'; Cards: Rene Ranger (yellow card) 37'; Marco Fepulea'i (yellow card) 65'	Report	Try: Gastón Mieres 25'; Con: Sam Malcolm (1/1) 26'; Pen: Sam Malcolm (4/4) 19', 32', 64', 66'; Cards: Andrew Quattrin (yellow card) 39'	Referee: Mike O’Brien (USAR)

Mar 7	NOLA Gold	31–22	New England Free Jacks	Gold Mine
15:00 CST	Try: Dino Waldren 15'; Nikola Bursic 31'; Scott Gale 64'; Cam Dolan 67'; Con: Carl Meyer (4/4) 16', 32', 65', 68'; Pen: Carl Meyer (1/1) 52'	Report	Try: John Poland 23', 54'; Conor Kindregan 43'; Liam Steel 49'; Con: Tadhg Leader (1/3) 24'; Beaudein Waaka (0/1); Pen: Tadhg Leader (0/1)	Referee: Jamie Nutbrown (NZR)

Mar 7	Houston SaberCats	20–24	Austin Gilgronis	AVEVA Stadium
19:00 CST	Try: Penalty try 9'; Sam Windsor 14'; Con: Sam Windsor (1/1) 15'; Pen: Sam Windsor (2/2) 27', 52'; Cards: Diego Magno (yellow card) 29'	Report	Try: Tiaan Erasmus 32', 47'; Mason Pedersen 43'; Con: Kurt Morath (1/1) 33'; Rodrigo Silva (1/1) 44'; Will Magie (1/1) 48'; Pen: Will Magie (1/1) 55'; Cards: Rodrick Waters (yellow card) 7'	Referee: Scott Green (USAR)

Mar 7	Seattle Seawolves	31–33	Utah Warriors	Starfire Sports Complex
18:00 PST	Try: Mike Shepherd 4'; Riekert Hattingh 24', 59'; Stephan Coetzee 46'; Con: Ben Cima (4/4) 4', 25', 47', 60'; Pen: Brock Staller (1/1) 79'; Cards: Stephan Coetzee (yellow card) 75'	Report	Try: Ratu Veremalua Vugakoto 12'; Tyler Fisher 43'; Kalolo Tuiloma 53'; Penalty try 76'; Calvin Whiting 80+8'; Con: Robbie Povey (3/4) 13', 44', 54'	Referee: Henrique Platais (CBRu)

Mar 8	Old Glory DC	31–29	Rugby ATL	Cardinal Stadium
18:00 EDT	Try: Dylan Taikato-Simpson 35'; Declan O'Donnell 40'; Danny Tusitala 58'; Con: Jason Robertson (2/3) 40', 59'; Pen: Jason Robertson (4/6) 8', 13, 21', 69'; Cards: Danny Tusitala (yellow card)	Report	Try: Penalty try 4'; Harley Davidson 9'; Alex Maughan 48', 72'; Con: Kurt Coleman (2/3) 10', 49'; Pen: Kurt Coleman (1/1) 25'; Cards: Bill Fukofuka (yellow card)	Referee: Derek Summers (USAR)

Mar 8	San Diego Legion	24–20	Rugby United New York	Torero Stadium
16:00 PDT	Try: Tira Patterson (2 tries) 14', 52'; Joshua Furno 55'; Con: Joe Pietersen (3/3) 15', 53', 56'; Pen: Joe Pietersen (1/2) 8'	Report	Try: Penalty try 22'; Will Leonard 60'; Con: Cathal Marsh (1/1) 61'; Pen: Cathal Marsh (2/2) 26', 35'; Cards: Paddy Ryan (yellow card)	Referee: Lex Weiner (USAR)

=== Cancelled schedule ===
==== Week 6 (Mar 14–15) ====
Mar 14	Rugby United New York	v	Seattle Seawolves	MCU Park
12:00 EST

Mar 14	New England Free Jacks	v	Houston SaberCats	Union Point Sports Complex
16:00 EST

Mar 14	Austin Gilgronis	v	San Diego Legion	Circuit of the Americas
18:00 EST

Mar 14	Utah Warriors	v	NOLA Gold	Zions Bank Stadium
21:00 EST

Mar 15	Old Glory DC	v	Colorado Raptors	Cardinal Stadium
15:00 EST

Bye/s: Rugby ATL, Toronto Arrows

==== Week 7 (Mar 21–22) ====
Mar 21	Colorado Raptors	v	Austin Gilgronis	Infinity Park
18:00 EST

Mar 21	Seattle Seawolves	v	Houston SaberCats	Starfire Sports Complex
21:00 EST

Mar 22	Rugby United New York	v	Toronto Arrows	MCU Park
12:00 EST

Mar 22	Rugby ATL	v	New England Free Jacks	Life University Running Eagles Stadium
15:00 EST

Mar 22	San Diego Legion	v	Old Glory DC	Torero Stadium
17:00 EST

Bye/s: NOLA Gold, Utah Warriors

==== Week 8 (Mar 28–29) ====
Mar 28	NOLA Gold	v	Toronto Arrows	Gold Mine
16:00 EST

Mar 28	Austin Gilgronis	v	Rugby ATL	Circuit of the Americas
18:00 EST

Mar 28	Utah Warriors	v	San Diego Legion	Zions Bank Stadium
21:00 EST

Mar 29	Old Glory DC	v	Rugby United New York	Cardinal Stadium
15:00 EST

Mar 29	Seattle Seawolves	v	Colorado Raptors	Starfire Sports Complex
20:00 EST

Bye/s: Houston SaberCats, New England Free Jacks

==== Week 9 (Apr 4–5) ====
Apr 4	Toronto Arrows	v	Utah Warriors	Alumni Field
14:00 EST

Apr 4	New England Free Jacks	v	Colorado Raptors	Union Point Sports Complex
16:00 EST

Apr 4	Austin Gilgronis	v	Seattle Seawolves	Circuit of the Americas
18:00 EST

Apr 5	Rugby ATL	v	NOLA Gold	Life University Running Eagles Stadium
15:00 EST

Apr 5	San Diego Legion	v	Houston SaberCats	Torero Stadium
17:00 EST

Bye/s: Old Glory DC, RUNY

==== Week 10 (Apr 10–12) ====
Apr 10	Rugby United New York	v	Rugby ATL	MCU Park
12:00 EST

Apr 11	Old Glory DC	v	NOLA Gold	Cardinal Stadium
15:00 EST

Apr 11	Houston SaberCats	v	Utah Warriors	AVEVA Stadium
20:00 EST

Apr 12	Toronto Arrows	v	New England Free Jacks	Alumni Field
14:00 EST

Apr 12	Seattle Seawolves	v	San Diego Legion	Starfire Sports Complex
20:00 EST

Bye/s: Austin Gilgronis, Colorado Raptors

==== Week 11 (Apr 18–19) ====
Apr 18	New England Free Jacks	v	Old Glory DC	Union Point Sports Complex
16:00 EST

Apr 18	Colorado Raptors	v	Houston SaberCats	Infinity Park
18:00 EST

Apr 18	NOLA Gold	v	Rugby United New York	Gold Mine
20:00 EST

Apr 18	Utah Warriors	v	Austin Gilgronis	Zions Bank Stadium
21:00 EST

Apr 19	Toronto Arrows	v	Rugby ATL	Lamport Stadium
14:00 EST

Bye/s: San Diego Legion, Seattle Seawolves

==== Week 12 (Apr 25–26) ====
Apr 25	Rugby United New York	v	Colorado Raptors	MCU Park
12:00 EST

Apr 25	New England Free Jacks	v	NOLA Gold	Union Point Sports Complex
16:00 EST

Apr 25	Utah Warriors	v	Seattle Seawolves	Zions Bank Stadium
21:00 EST

Apr 26	Rugby ATL	v	San Diego Legion	Life University Running Eagles Stadium
15:00 EST

Apr 26	Old Glory DC	v	Toronto Arrows	Cardinal Stadium
15:00 EST

Apr 26	Austin Gilgronis	v	Houston SaberCats	Circuit of the Americas
20:00 EST

==== Week 13 (May 1–3) ====
May 1	Rugby United New York	v	New England Free Jacks	MCU Park
12:00 EST

May 2	Colorado Raptors	v	Rugby ATL	Infinity Park
18:00 EST

May 2	Houston SaberCats	v	Seattle Seawolves	AVEVA Stadium
20:00 EST

May 3	Toronto Arrows	v	NOLA Gold	Lamport Stadium
14:00 EST

May 3	Old Glory DC	v	Utah Warriors	Cardinal Stadium
15:00 EST

May 3	San Diego Legion	v	Austin Gilgronis	Torero Stadium
17:00 EST

==== Week 14 (May 9–10) ====
May 9	Rugby United New York	v	Old Glory DC	MCU Park
12:00 EST

May 9	New England Free Jacks	v	Austin Gilgronis	Union Point Sports Complex
16:00 EST

May 9	NOLA Gold	v	Houston SaberCats	Gold Mine
20:00 EST

May 9	Utah Warriors	v	Colorado Raptors	Zions Bank Stadium
21:00 EST

May 10	Toronto Arrows	v	San Diego Legion	Lamport Stadium
14:00 EST

May 10	Rugby ATL	v	Seattle Seawolves	Life University Running Eagles Stadium
15:00 EST

==== Week 15 (May 16–17) ====
May 16	New England Free Jacks	v	Toronto Arrows	Union Point Sports Complex
16:00 EST

May 16	Houston SaberCats	v	San Diego Legion	AVEVA Stadium
20:00 EST

May 16	Utah Warriors	v	Rugby United New York	Zions Bank Stadium
21:00 EST

May 17	Rugby ATL	v	Old Glory DC	Life University Running Eagles Stadium
15:00 EST

May 17	Seattle Seawolves	v	NOLA Gold	Starfire Sports Complex
20:00 EST

May 17	Austin Gilgronis	v	Colorado Raptors	Circuit of the Americas
20:00 EST

==== Week 16 (May 22–25) ====
May 22	Toronto Arrows	v	Rugby United New York	Lamport Stadium
19:00 EST

May 23	Colorado Raptors	v	Seattle Seawolves	Infinity Park
18:00 EST

May 23	NOLA Gold	v	Austin Gilgronis	Gold Stadium
20:00 EST

May 23	Houston SaberCats	v	Rugby ATL	AVEVA Stadium
20:00 EST

May 24	Old Glory DC	v	New England Free Jacks	Cardinal Stadium
15:00 EST

May 25	San Diego Legion	v	Utah Warriors	Torero Stadium
17:00 EST

==== Week 17 (May 30–31) ====
May 30	Rugby United New York	v	NOLA Gold	MCU Park
12:00 EST

May 30	New England Free Jacks	v	Rugby ATL	Union Point Sports Complex
16:00 EST

May 30	Colorado Raptors	v	San Diego Legion	Infinity Park
18:00 EST

May 30	Utah Warriors	v	Houston SaberCats	Zions Bank Stadium
21:00 EST

May 31	Toronto Arrows	v	Old Glory DC	Lamport Stadium
14:00 EST

May 31	Seattle Seawolves	v	Austin Gilgronis	Starfire Sports Complex
20:00 EST

== Playoffs ==
The top three teams from each conference would have qualified for the playoffs had the season not been cancelled. The top team in each conference earns a bye week while the second and third place team play in a conference semifinal.

== Player statistics ==
=== Top scorers ===
The top ten try and point scorers during the 2020 Major League Rugby season were:

Last updated: March 9, 2020

Most tries
No	Player	Team	Tries
1	(United States) Riekert Hattingh	Seattle Seawolves	5
2	(Canada) Dan Moor	Toronto Arrows	4
2	(United States) Cam Dolan	NOLA Gold	4
2	(South Africa) Tiaan Erasmus	Austin Gilgronis	4
2	(Ireland) John Poland	New England Free Jacks	4
6	(South Africa) Dean Muir	San Diego Legion	3
6	(Australia) Sam Windsor	Houston SaberCats	3
6	(Canada) Doug Fraser	Old Glory DC	3
6	(United States) Kyle Sumsion	RUNY	3
6	(United States) Moni Tonga'uiha	NOLA Gold	3

Most points
No	Player	Team	Pts
1	(New Zealand) Sam Malcolm	Toronto Arrows	60
2	(Australia) Sam Windsor	Houston SaberCats	57
3	(New Zealand) Jason Robertson	Old Glory DC	51
4	(South Africa) Carl Meyer	NOLA Gold	48
5	(Germany) Hagen Schulte	Utah Warriors	43
6	(Ireland) Cathal Marsh	RUNY	37
6	(Australia) Luke Burton	San Diego Legion	37
8	(Canada) Brock Staller	Seattle Seawolves	30
9	(South Africa) Kurt Coleman	Rugby ATL	29
10	(United States) Ben Cima	Seattle Seawolves	27
10	(Chile) Marcelo Torrealba	Austin Gilgronis	27

=== Sanctions ===
Player	Team	Red	Yellow
(Canada) Mike Shephard	Toronto Arrows	1	0
(Fiji) Poasa Waqanibau	New England Free Jacks	0	2
(Uruguay) Diego Magno	Houston SaberCats	0	2
(United States) Brendan Daly	Colorado Raptors	0	1
(United States) Malcolm May	NOLA Gold	0	1
(United States) Lindsay Stevens	NOLA Gold	0	1
(Chile) Nikola Bursic	NOLA Gold	0	1
(New Zealand) Gordon Fullerton	Old Glory DC	0	1
(Tonga) Saia Uhila	Utah Warriors	0	1
(Canada) Josh Larsen	New England Free Jacks	0	1
(England) Ben Foden	RUNY	0	1
(United States) Peter Malcolm	San Diego Legion	0	1
(United States) Vili Toluta'u	Seattle Seawolves	0	1
(Fiji) Lino Saunitoga	Austin Gilgronis	0	1
(Samoa) Potu Leavasa Jr.	Austin Gilgronis	0	1
(New Zealand) Brad Hemopo	New England Free Jacks	0	1
(United States) Anthony Parry	RUNY	0	1
(Australia) Sione Fangaiuiha	Austin Gilgronis	0	1
(Fiji) Maikeli Mudu	Austin Gilgronis	0	1
(Argentina) Tomás de la Vega	Toronto Arrows	0	1
(South Africa) Tiaan Loots	Houston SaberCats	0	1
(Canada) Nakai Penny	Seattle Seawolves	0	1
(United States) Tim Maupin	NOLA Gold	0	1
(South Africa) JP du Plessis	San Diego Legion	0	1
(United States) Kelepi Fifita	Colorado Raptors	0	1
(United States) Holden Yungert	NOLA Gold	0	1
(New Zealand) Jamie Mackintosh	Austin Gilgronis	0	1
(New Zealand) Renata Roberts-Tenana	Old Glory DC	0	1
(Uruguay) Manuel Diana	Toronto Arrows	0	1
(United States) Paddy Ryan	RUNY	0	1
(South Africa) Carl Meyer	NOLA Gold	0	1
(Italy) Joshua Furno	San Diego Legion	0	1
(United States) Will Vakalahi	Old Glory DC	0	1
(South Africa) Neethling Gericke	Rugby ATL	0	1
(Canada) Andrew Ferguson	Toronto Arrows	0	1
(New Zealand) Rene Ranger	Colorado Raptors	0	1
(Samoa) Marco Fepulea'i	Colorado Raptors	0	1
(Canada) Andrew Quattrin	Toronto Arrows	0	1
(United States) Rodrick Waters	Austin Gilgronis	0	1
(South Africa) Stephan Coetzee	Seattle Seawolves	0	1

== MLR Virtual ==
Following the cancellation of the 2020 season, the MLR announced they would host a tournament, with each team, playing Rugby 20. The teams would enter a pool to select which nation they would play as. The MLR also announced that all of the MLR teams would be raising money and awareness for Feeding America's COVID-19 Response Fund, and that all matches would be streamed on the league's Twitch account.

MLR Team (National Team)	Wins	Draws	Loses
Austin Gilgronis (Fiji)	0	0	0
Colorado Raptors (New Zealand)	0	0	0
Houston Sabercats (Ireland)	0	0	0
New England Free Jacks (Wales)	1	0	5
New Orleans Gold (United States)	1	0	0
Old Glory DC (France)	0	0	0
Rugby ATL (Japan)	1	0	0
Rugby United New York (Australia)	0	0	1
San Diego Legion (South Africa)	0	0	0
Seattle Seawolves (England)	0	0	0
Toronto Arrows (Canada)	1	0	0
Utah Warriors (Uruguay)	0	0	0

=== Round 1 ===
Mar 20	New England Free Jacks	17-34	Toronto Arrows
7:00 EST

Mar 20	Seattle Seawolves	5-34	Austin Gilgronis

Mar 22	Colorado Raptors	v	Houston SaberCats
7:00 EST

=== Round 2 ===
Mar 24	New England Free Jacks	14-28	New Orleans Gold
8:00 EST

Mar 24	San Diego Legion	v	Houston SaberCats

Mar 25	Utah Warriors	v	Austin Gilgronis
8:00 EST

Mar 26	Old Glory DC	27-28	Rugby United New York
8:00 EST

Mar 26	Seattle Seawolves	0-50	Colorado Raptors

=== Round 3 ===
Mar 26	New England Free Jacks	26-28	Old Glory DC
6:00 EST

Mar 28	Colorado Raptors	v	Austin Gilgronis
6:00 EST

Mar 28	v	Houston SaberCats

Apr 4	Seattle Seawolves	47-0	San Diego Legion

=== Round 4 ===
Marc 31	Utah Warriors	v	Colorado Raptors
8:00 EST

Apr 1	New England Free Jacks	10-5	Rugby United New York
8:00 EST

Apr 1	Seattle Seawolves	v	Houston SaberCats
9:00 EST

Apr 2	San Diego Legion	v	Austin Gilgronis
8:00 EST

=== Round 5 ===
Apr 4	New England Free Jacks	0-52	Rugby ATL
6:00 EST

Apr 4	Houston Sabercats	13-5	Austin Gilgronis
6:00 EST

Apr 4	Colorado Raptors	v	San Diego Legion
6:00 EST

Apr 4	Seattle Seawolves	28-0	Utah Warriors

=== Playoffs ===
==== First round ====
Apr 7	New England Free Jacks	0-5	San Diego Legion
5:00 EST

Apr 8	Seattle Seawolves	26-17	Rugby United New York

==== Semi-finals ====
Apr 9	New Orleans Gold	0-5	Austin Gilgronis

==== Final ====
Apr 10	Colorado Raptors	v	Austin Gilgronis
4:00 EST

=== Friendlies ===
Jun 15	Rugby United New York	5-19	South China Tigers

Jun 27	Rugby United New York	19-17	South China Tigers

== MLR Draft ==
The 1st ever Major League Rugby collegiate draft was held in 2020. Players were eligible for the draft after 3 years of college or if they had reached 21 years of age. Free agents were permitted try out to join teams at 18 years old.

== See also ==
- 2020 MLR Draft
