= 2016 World Rugby Americas Pacific Challenge =

2016 Americas Pacific Challenge
Tournament details
- Date: 8–16 October 2016
- Countries: Argentina XV; Canada A Fiji Warriors; Samoa A Uruguay A USA Selects
- Teams: 6

Final positions
- Champions: Argentina XV
- Runner-up: Fiji Warriors

Tournament statistics
- Matches played: 9
- Tries scored: 84 (9.33 per match)
- Top scorer(s): (Argentina) Juan Cruz González (37)
- Most tries: (Argentina) Benjamín Macome (4)

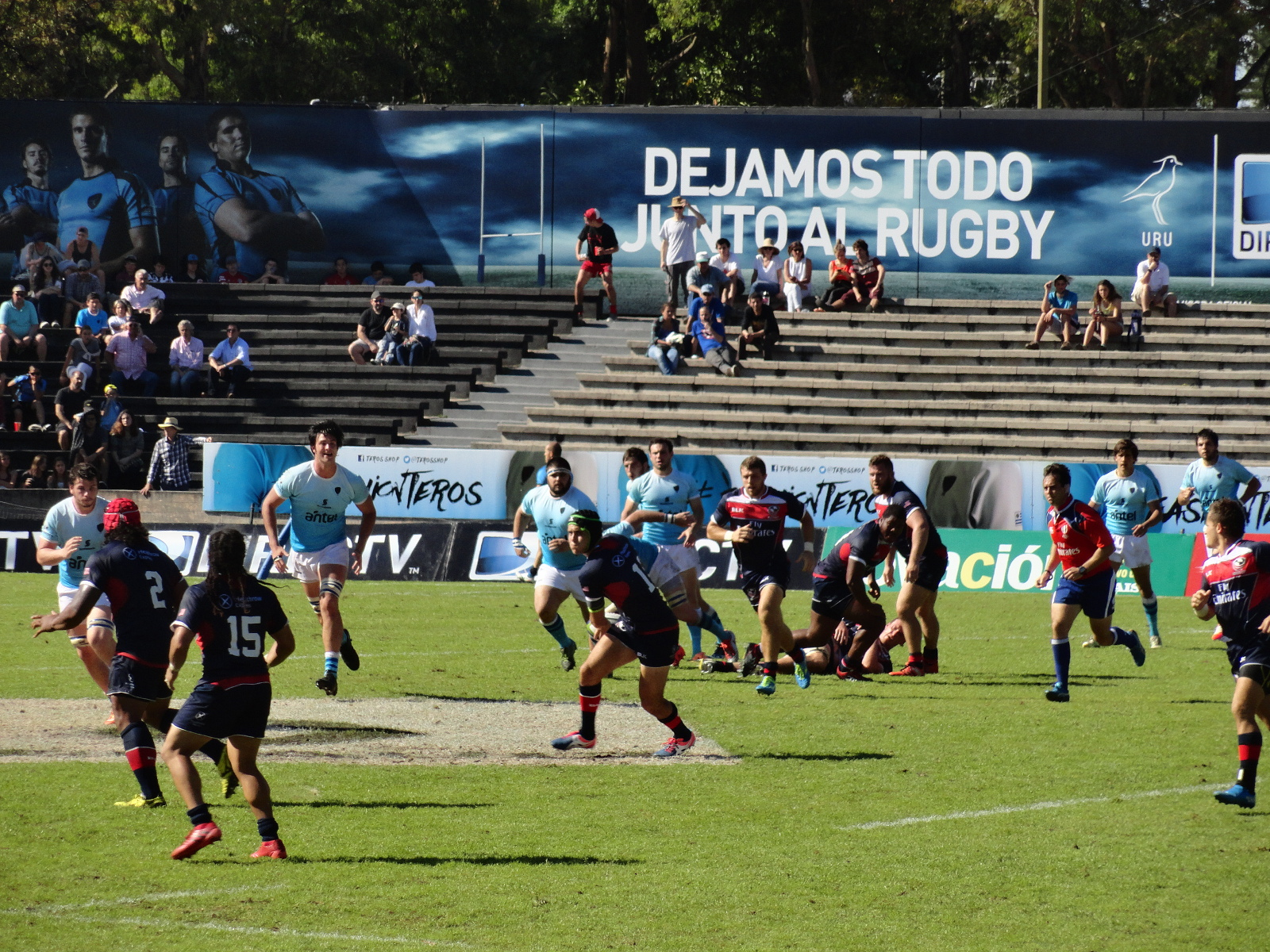
Uruguay vs United States, Montevideo 2016

The 2016 World Rugby Americas Pacific Challenge was the inaugural rugby union tournament created by World Rugby for national 'A' teams to develop home grown talent for their national test sides.

The Americas Pacific Challenge provides the Pacific nations a chance of further competition outside their own region, as the Pacific Challenge is reduced to just the Pacific nations when Rugby World Cup qualifiers are played.

For national 'A' teams from the Americas, this new tournament replaced the pre-2015 format of the Americas Rugby Championship, which is now an annual championship elevated to test status.

The tournament was hosted by Uruguay, with all matches played at the 14,000 capacity stadium Estadio Charrúa in Montevideo. Argentina XV won the tournament undefeated, with Fiji Warriors as runner-up.

== Format ==
With six teams in the tournament and a limitation of three matches per team, a "split pool" format was used. The field was split into two pools, with teams in one pool only playing the teams in the other. The competing teams were:

Group A

- Argentina XV
- Samoa A
- USA Selects

Group B

- Canada A
- Fiji Warriors
- Uruguay A

== Table ==
Final standings for combined pools:

| Rank | Team | Games | | | | Points | | | Try Bonus | Losing Bonus | Table Points |
| Rank | Team | P | W | D | L | PF | PA | Diff | Try Bonus | Losing Bonus | Table Points |
|---|---|---|---|---|---|---|---|---|---|---|---|
| 1 | Argentina XV | 3 | 3 | 0 | 0 | 154 | 62 | +92 | 2 | 0 | 14 |
| 2 | Fiji Warriors | 3 | 2 | 0 | 1 | 127 | 65 | +62 | 4 | 0 | 12 |
| 3 | Samoa A | 3 | 2 | 0 | 1 | 97 | 103 | -6 | 1 | 0 | 9 |
| 4 | Uruguay A | 3 | 1 | 0 | 2 | 96 | 130 | -34 | 3 | 0 | 7 |
| 5 | USA Selects | 3 | 1 | 0 | 2 | 74 | 106 | -72 | 1 | 0 | 5 |
| 6 | Canada A | 3 | 0 | 0 | 3 | 88 | 130 | -42 | 3 | 0 | 3 |
Updated: 16 October 2016; Source: World Rugby; Four points for a win, two for a draw, and no points for a bye. One bonus point for scoring four or more tries in a match. One bonus point for losing by seven or less. The tie-break mechanism for teams finishing on the same table points has not been sourced.

== Fixtures ==
The matches were announced on 7 September 2016.

All times are local UYT (UTC-03)

=== Round 1 ===
| 8 October 2016 | Argentina XV | 56–29 | Canada A | Estadio Charrúa, Montevideo |
| 12:30 | Try: Tuculet 11' c Delguy 14' c Macome (4) 27' c, 36' c, 45' c, 68' c Gigena 56' c Báez 75' c Con: González (6/6) 12', 15', 28', 37', 46', 57'; Miotti (2/2) 69', 76' | Report | Try: McRorie 62' c, Con: McRorie (1/2) 63'; Povey (2/2) 78', 80'; Pen: McRorie (1/1) 18' | Attendance: 500; Referee: Tim Baker (Hong Kong) |

Team details

| FB | 15 | Bautista Delguy |
| RW | 14 | Segundo Tuculet |
| OC | 13 | Santiago Álvarez |
| IC | 12 | Juan Cappiello |
| LW | 11 | Fernando Luna | | (substituted off) 24' | (substituted on) 34' |
| FH | 10 | Juan Cruz González | | (substituted off) 62' |
| SH | 9 | Felipe Ezcurra (c) | | (substituted off) 62' |
| N8 | 8 | Benjamín Macome |
| OF | 7 | Tomás Lezana | | (substituted off) 40' |
| BF | 6 | Rodrigo Báez |
| RL | 5 | Ignacio Larrague |
| LL | 4 | Juan Cruz Guillemaín | (yellow card) 24' to 34' | (substituted off) 56' |
| TP | 3 | Cristian Bartoloni | (yellow card) 23' to 33' | | | (substituted off) 62' |
| HK | 2 | Axel Zapata | | (substituted off) 56' |
| LP | 1 | Facundo Gigena |
Replacements:
| HK | 16 | Gaspar Baldunciel | | (substituted on) 56' |
| PR | 17 | Nicolás Solveyra |
| PR | 18 | Santiago Medrano | | (substituted on) 24' | (substituted off) 34' | (substituted on) 62' |
| LK | 19 | Pedro Ortega | | (substituted on) 56' |
| N8 | 20 | Santiago Montagner | | (substituted on) 40' |
| SH | 21 | Gonzalo Bertranou | | (substituted on) 62' |
| FH | 22 | Domingo Miotti | | (substituted on) 62' |
| CE | 23 | Julián Domínguez |
Coach:
(Argentina) Diego Ternavasio

| FB | 15 | Rory McDonell |
| RW | 14 | Kainoa Lloyd | | (substituted off) 65' | (substituted on) 70' |
| OC | 13 | Giuseppe du Toit | | (substituted off) 55' |
| IC | 12 | Ben LeSage |
| LW | 11 | Dan Moor | | (substituted off) 40' |
| FH | 10 | Pat Parfrey |
| SH | 9 | Gordon McRorie (c) | | (substituted off) 72' |
| N8 | 8 | Lucas Rumball | | (substituted off) 54' |
| OF | 7 | Matt Heaton |
| BF | 6 | Kyle Baillie |
| RL | 5 | Adrian Wadden |
| LL | 4 | Conor Keys | | (substituted off) 46' |
| TP | 3 | Ryan Kotlewski | | (substituted off) 68' |
| HK | 2 | Ray Barkwill | (yellow card) 55' to 65' |
| LP | 1 | Rob Brouwer | (yellow card) 58' to 68' | | (substituted off) 70' |
Replacements:
| HK | 16 | Martial Lagain |
| PR | 17 | Peter Houlihan | | (substituted on) 65' |
| PR | 18 | Ryan Ackerman | | (substituted on) 68' |
| LK | 19 | Lucas Albornoz | | (substituted on) 46' |
| FL | 20 | Nanyak Dala | | (substituted on) 54' |
| SH | 21 | Andrew Ferguson | | (substituted on) 72' |
| CE | 22 | Robbie Povey | | (substituted on) 55' |
| WG | 23 | Anton Ngongo | | (substituted on) 40' |
Coach:
(New Zealand) Mark Anscombe

| 8 October 2016 | USA Selects | 12–62 | Fiji Warriors | Estadio Charrúa, Montevideo |
| 14:30 | Try: Leuta 5'; Tomasin 47' c Con: Eloff (1/2) 48' | Report | Try: Tovilevu 7' m Hickes 15' c Radrodro (2) 28' m, 51' c Doge 39' c Veitokani 52' m Penalty try 59' c Mudu 65' c Nadruku 68' c Daveta 73' m Con: Veitokani (6/10) 16', 40', 51', 60', 66', 69' | Attendance: 600; Referee: Ricardo Sant'Anna (Brazil) |

Team details

| FB | 15 | Mike Te'o |
| RW | 14 | Brett Thompson |
| OC | 13 | Bryce Campbell |
| IC | 12 | Martin Iosefo | (yellow card) 37' to 47' |
| LW | 11 | Matai Leuta | | (substituted off) 61' |
| FH | 10 | JP Eloff | | (substituted off) 61' |
| SH | 9 | Stephen Tomasin | | (substituted off) 72' |
| N8 | 8 | Sione Tu'ihalamaka | | (substituted off) 48' | (substituted on) 55' |
| OF | 7 | Pat Blair |
| BF | 6 | Harry Higgins |
| RL | 5 | Matt Jensen | | (substituted off) 68' |
| LL | 4 | Siaosi Mahoni | | (substituted off) 55' |
| TP | 3 | Demecus Beach | (yellow card) 44' to 54' | | | (substituted off) 68' | (substituted on) 77' |
| HK | 2 | Joe Taufete'e (c) | | (substituted off) 63' |
| LP | 1 | Mason Pedersen | | (substituted off) 27' | (substituted on) 70' |
Replacements:
| HK | 16 | Hanco Germishuys | | (substituted on) 63' |
| PR | 17 | Chance Wenglewski | | (substituted on) 27' | (substituted off) 70' |
| PR | 18 | Alex Maughan | | (substituted on) 48' | (substituted off) 55' | (substituted on) 68' | (substituted off) 77' |
| LK | 19 | Christian Ostberg | | (substituted on) 68' |
| FL | 20 | Malon Al-Jiboori | | (substituted on) 55' |
| SH | 21 | Nick Boyer | | (substituted on) 72' |
| FH | 22 | Ben Cima | | (substituted on) 61' |
| CE | 23 | Ahmad Harajly | | (substituted on) 61' |
Coach:
(United States) Ray Egan

| FB | 15 | Lepani Raiyala |
| RW | 14 | Apete Daveta | (substituted off) 69' |
| OC | 13 | Ifereimi Tovilevu | (substituted off) 56' |
| IC | 12 | Eroni Vasiteri |
| LW | 11 | Fred Hickes |
| FH | 10 | Alivereti Veitokani |
| SH | 9 | Henry Seniloli | (substituted off) 58' |
| N8 | 8 | Eremasi Radrodro | (substituted off) 65' |
| OF | 7 | Vasikali Mudu |
| BF | 6 | Nemani Nagusa |
| RL | 5 | Mesulame Kunavula |
| LL | 4 | Rupeni Nasiga (c) | (substituted off) 62' |
| TP | 3 | Mesake Doge | (substituted off) 68' |
| HK | 2 | Jerry Naureure | (substituted off) 56' |
| LP | 1 | Joeli Veitayaki Jr. | (substituted off) 68' |
Replacements:
| HK | 16 | Iliesa Leca | (substituted on) 56' |
| PR | 17 | Mosese Ducivaki | (substituted on) 68' |
| PR | 18 | Kalivati Tawake | (substituted on) 68' |
| LK | 19 | Esikia Macu | (substituted on) 62' |
| FL | 20 | Sakiusa Nadruku | (substituted on) 65' |
| SH | 21 | Sakiusa Gavidi | (substituted on) 58' |
| WG | 22 | Ilimeleki Leiloma | (substituted on) 69' |
| CE | 23 | Sitiveni Kunaga | (substituted on) 56' |
Coach:
(Fiji) Senirusi Seruvakula

| 8 October 2016 | Samoa A | 44–42 | Uruguay A | Estadio Charrúa, Montevideo |
| 16:30 | Try: Fa'afou 31' m Magele 34' c Peleseuma (2) 42' m, 65' c Tuiletufuga 47' c Leilua 58' c Con: Fa'apale (4/6) 35', 48', 59', 66'; Pen: Fa'apale (2/2) 21', 80' | Report | Try: Penalty try (2) 40' c, 45' c Freitas (2) 53' m, 68' c Arata 61' c Con: Etcheverry (4/5) 40', 46', 62', 69'; Pen: Etcheverry (3/3) 20', 30', 78' | Attendance: 1,200; Referee: Pali de Luca (Argentina) |

Team details

| FB | 15 | Malu Falaniko | | (substituted off) 65' |
| RW | 14 | Jeff Makapelu | | (substituted off) 60' |
| OC | 13 | Ope Peleseuma |
| IC | 12 | Meki Magele |
| LW | 11 | La'aloi Leilua |
| FH | 10 | Patrick Fa'apale |
| SH | 9 | Danny Tusitala |
| N8 | 8 | Afa Aiono (c) |
| OF | 7 | Oneone Fa'afou |
| BF | 6 | Joshua Fuimaono | | (substituted off) 40' |
| RL | 5 | Mikaele Tapili | | (substituted off) 65' |
| LL | 4 | Talaga Alofipo |
| TP | 3 | Nephi Leatigaga | (yellow card) 40' to 50' |
| HK | 2 | Ropeti Lafo | | (substituted off) 5' |
| LP | 1 | Michael Tuiloma |
Replacements:
| HK | 16 | Malcolm Tanielu | | (substituted on) 5' |
| PR | 17 | Sylvester Taupau |
| PR | 18 | Nu'uuli Lene |
| LK | 19 | Callum Adams | | (substituted on) 65' |
| N8 | 20 | Suamalie Tuiletufuga | | (substituted on) 40' |
| SH | 21 | Melani Matavao |
| FH | 22 | Jack Saena | | (substituted on) 65' |
| WG | 23 | Johnny Va'ili | | (substituted on) 60' |
Coach:
(Samoa) Mailo Potumoe Leavasa

| FB | 15 | Rodrigo Silva | | (substituted off) 57' |
| RW | 14 | Santiago Arata |
| OC | 13 | Joaquín Prada | | (substituted off) 65' |
| IC | 12 | Nicolás Freitas |
| LW | 11 | Santiago Gibernau |
| FH | 10 | Jerónimo Etcheverry |
| SH | 9 | Guillermo Lijtenstein |
| N8 | 8 | Gonzalo Soto | | (substituted off) 48' |
| OF | 7 | Santiago Hernández | | (substituted off) 59' |
| BF | 6 | Joaquín Dell'Acqua |
| RL | 5 | Diego Ayala |
| LL | 4 | Diego Magno |
| TP | 3 | Mario Sagario (c) |
| HK | 2 | Juan Echeverría |
| LP | 1 | Mateo Sanguinetti | (yellow card) 57' to 67' | (substituted off) 67' |
Replacements:
| HK | 16 | Marcos Chamyán |
| PR | 17 | Ignacio Secco | | (substituted on) 59' |
| PR | 18 | Diego Arbelo |
| FL | 19 | Manuel Leindekar | | (substituted on) 48' |
| FL | 20 | Fernando Bascou | | (substituted on) 67' |
| SH | 21 | Facundo Klappenbach |
| FH | 22 | Manuel Blengio | | (substituted on) 57' |
| CE | 23 | Juan Manuel Cat | | (substituted on) 65' |
Coach:
(Argentina) Esteban Meneses

=== Round 2 ===
| 12 October 2016 | Samoa A | 26–39 | Fiji Warriors | Estadio Charrúa, Montevideo |
| 12:30 | Try: Tanielu; Peleseuma; Con: Fa’apale (2/2); Pen: Fa’apale (4/4) | Report | Try: Radrodro; Gavidi; Leca; Daveta; Hickes; Con: Veitokani (4/5); Pen: Veitokani | Attendance: 200; Referee: Pali de Luca (Argentina) |

| 12 October 2016 | USA Selects | 47–37 | Canada A | Estadio Charrúa, Montevideo |
| 14:30 | Try: Boyer; Iosefo (2); Te'o; Harajly; Con: Cima (5/5); Pen: Cima (4/4) | Report | Try: Fraser; LeSage (2); Rumball; Albornoz; Con: McRorie (2/4); Albornoz (1/1); Pen: McRorie (2/2) | Attendance: 300; Referee: Ricardo Sant’Anna (CBRu) |

| 12 October 2016 | Argentina XV | 71–7 | Uruguay A | Estadio Charrúa, Montevideo |
| 16:30 | Try: S. Montagner (10); C. Bartoloni (13); B. Delguy 2 (21, 65); G. Bertranou (25); F. Bosch (32); J. Guillemaín (36); J. Domínguez (39); F. Luna 2 (75, 80); J. Cappiello (78); Con: D. Miotti 4/6 (11, 22, 26, 40); J. González 4/4 (66, 76, 79, 80) | Report | Try: A. Rocco (45); Con: J. Etcheverry (46) | Referee: Tim Baker (Hong Kong) |

=== Round 3 ===
| 16 October 2016 | Samoa A | 27–22 | Canada A | Estadio Charrúa, Montevideo |
| 12:30 | Try: O. Fa’afou (11); O. Peleseuma (18); J. Saena (35); Con: J. Saena 3/3 (12, 19, 36); Pen: J. Saena (74); Drop: P. Fa’apale (80) | Report | Try: Penalty try (30); B. LeSage (50); G. McRorie (70); Con: A. Ferguson 2 (31, 51); G. McRorie (0/1); Pen: A. Ferguson (13) | Referee: Tim Baker (HKRFU) |

| 16 October 2016 | USA Selects | 15–47 | Uruguay A | Estadio Charrúa, Montevideo |
| 14:30 | Try: J. Turnbull (37); M. Al-Jiboori (45); Con: B. Cima 1/2 (37); Pen: B. Cima (3) | Report | Try: S. Hernández (18); S. Gibernau (39); D. Magno (64), F. Klappenbach (74); R. Silva (78); Con: J. Etcheverry 5/5 (19, 40, 65, 75, 79); Pen: J. Etcheverry 4 (6, 14, 27, 33) | Referee: Ricardo Sant’Anna (CBRu) |

| 16 October 2016 | Argentina XV | 27–26 | Fiji Warriors | Estadio Charrúa, Montevideo |
| 16:00 | Try: J. González (30); J. Domínguez (36); P. Ortega (80); Con: J. González 3/3 (31, 37, 80); Pen: J. González 2 (14, 66) | Report | Try: L. Raiyala 3 (48, 62, 69); S. Kunaga (52); Con: A. Veitokani 2/4 (53, 70) | Referee: Joaquín Montes (URU) |

== See also ==
- 2016 end-of-year rugby union internationals
- Americas Rugby Championship
- World Rugby Pacific Challenge
