= Chance Wenglewski =

American rugby union player (b. 1997)

- Full name: Chance Allen Wenglewski
- Born: April 9, 1997 (age 29) Tulsa, Oklahoma, United States
- Height: 6 ft 2 in (1.88 m)
- Weight: 250 lb (110 kg)
- School: Union High School
- University: Lindenwood University

Rugby union career
- Position: Prop
Amateur team(s)
| Years | Team | Apps | (Points) |
| c. 2015-2019 | Lindenwood University | | |
- Correct as of November 27, 2018
Senior career
| Years | Team | Apps | (Points) |
| 2019–2023 | Rugby ATL | 5 | |
| 2019 | → RUNY (loan) | 3 | (0) |
| 2024-Present | Seattle Seawolves | 17 | (0) |
- Correct as of 25 February 2021
International career
| Years | Team | Apps | (Points) |
| 2016 | United States U20 | 4 | (0) |
| 2016–2017 | United States U23 | | |
| 2016– | USA Selects | 7 | (0) |
| 2018– | United States | 8 | (0) |
- Correct as of September 16, 2021

Chance Allen Wenglewski (born April 9, 1997) is a rugby union player who plays at prop for Seattle Seawolves of Major League Rugby (MLR) and the United States men's national team.

He previously played for Lindenwood University. Wenglewski has also played for the USA Selects and multiple age-grade sides representing the United States. He is married to wife, Mariah Wenglewski. Though he has no children, he has a white lab, Betsy.

== Early life ==
Wenglewski was born on April 9, 1997, in Tulsa, Oklahoma. Wenglewski attended Union High School in Tulsa, where he played football. As of 2018, Wenglewski attends Lindenwood University where he has been a member of the Lindenwood Lions men's rugby team.

== International career ==
=== USA Junior All-Americans ===
Wenglewski was first named to the United States national under-20 rugby union team (Junior All-Americans) ahead of two qualification matches for the 2016 World Rugby Under 20 Trophy against Canada. Upon the Junior All-Americans qualification for the tournament, Wenglewski also played for the team there in Harare, Zimbabwe. Wenglewski also played for the Junior All-Americans in qualification matches for the 2017 World Rugby Under 20 Trophy.

=== USA Collegiate All-Americans ===
Wenglewski represented the United States, playing for the Men's Collegiate All-Americans' (MCAAs) in a September 2017 match against Oxford University.

=== USA Selects ===
Wenglewski was first named to the roster for the USA Selects in advance of the 2016 Americas Pacific Challenge. Wenglewski also represented the Selects at the Americas Pacific Challenge in 2017 and 2018.

=== USA Eagles ===
Wenglewski was first named to the roster for the USA Eagles for the 2018 Americas Rugby Championship, but he did not make an appearance during the competition. Wenglewski again was named to the Eagles' roster in October 2018, replacing an injured Olive Kilifi ahead of the 2018 end-of-year tests. Wenglewski made his debut for the Eagles on November 3, 2018, starting at prop, in an uncapped match against the Māori All Blacks—a 59–22 defeat. Wenglewski earned his first cap with the Eagles on November 24, 2018, appearing as a substitute, in the Eagles' 57–14 defeat to Ireland.
