= Alex Maughan =

American rugby union player (b. 1995)

- Born: April 24, 1995 (age 31) Charlotte, North Carolina, United States
- Height: 5 ft 10 in (1.78 m)
- Weight: 235 lb (107 kg)
- School: Arborbrook Christian Academy
- University: Life University

Rugby union career
- Position(s): Prop; Hooker
- Current team: Rugby ATL
Amateur team(s)
Years	Team	Apps	(Points)
c. 2015–2019	Life University		
2019–	404 Rugby		
- Correct as of November 14, 2018
Senior career
Years	Team	Apps	(Points)
2019–	Rugby ATL	5	(15)
2019	→ New Orleans Gold (loan)	3	(0)
International career
Years	Team	Apps	(Points)
2016	United States U23		
2016–	USA Selects	6	(0)
2017	United States	1	(0)
- Correct as of 25 February 2021

Alex Maughan (born April 24, 1995) is an American rugby union player who plays in the front row for Rugby FC Los Angeles in Major League Rugby (MLR). He also represents America playing for the United States men's national team.

Maughan has previously played for Life University, the USA Selects, and the USA Men's Collegiate All-Americans.

== Early life ==
Maughan was born on April 24, 1995. Maughan attended high school at Arborbrook Christian Academy in North Carolina. After high school, Maughan attended Life University, winning Division 1-A National Championships with the school's rugby team in 2016 and 2018.

== International career ==
=== USA Collegiate All-Americans ===
Maughan was selected to represent the United States in the Men's Collegiate All-Americans' (MCAAs) 2016 tour of Queensland, Australia. Maughan made his first start for the MCAAs at prop, in their August 10 match against Brothers Rugby Club.

=== USA Selects ===
Maughan was first selected to the USA Selects' roster in advance of the 2016 Americas Pacific Challenge. Maughan made his debut for the Selects on October 8, 2016, appearing as a substitute, in a 62–12 defeat to Fiji. Maughan also made appearances for the Selects in the Americas Pacific Challenge in 2017 and 2018.

=== USA Eagles ===
Maughan made his debut with the USA Eagles on February 4, 2017, appearing as a substitute, in the Eagles' 29–23 victory over Uruguay in the 2017 Americas Rugby Championship. In October 2018, Maughan was named to the Eagles roster in advance of the 2018 end-of-year tests.
