= Malon Al-Jiboori =

American rugby union player (b. 1997)

- Born: August 1, 1997 (age 29) Tulsa, Oklahoma
- Height: 6 ft 3 in (1.91 m)
- Weight: 230 lb (100 kg)
- School: Union High School
- University: Lindenwood University

Rugby union career
- Position: Flanker
Senior career
Years	Team	Apps	(Points)
2018	San Diego Legion	1	(0)
2019	Glendale Raptors	14	(10)
2020–2021	San Diego Legion	1	(0)
2021	Ealing Trailfinders	0	(0)
2022–	Houston Sabercats	23	(5)
- Correct as of 1 May 2021
International career
Years	Team	Apps	(Points)
2016	United States U20	4	(17)
2016	United States U23		
2016	USA Selects	3	(5)
2018–	United States	6	(5)
- Correct as of 5 April 2020
National sevens team
Years	Team		Comps
2016–2020	United States		9
- Correct as of 1 May 2021

Malon Maurice Al-Jiboori (born August 1, 1997) is an American rugby union player who plays for the United States men's national rugby sevens team and the United States men's national team (XVs). He currently plays for Ealing Trailfinders and the Houston SaberCats in Major League Rugby (MLR).

Al-Jiboori previously represented the United States at the international level with multiple age-grade sides.

== Early life ==
Al-Jiboori was born on August 1, 1997. Al-Jiboori grew up in Tulsa, Oklahoma, and attended Union High School. Al-Jiboori played American football throughout his youth, earned a college football scholarship, and aspired to play in the NFL. However, Al-Jiboori began playing rugby at the age of 16, after watching an older brother play the game. Ultimately, he would decline his football scholarship offer and leave Tulsa to attend Lindenwood University and play for the school's rugby teams. He was named Division 1-A Player of the Week on January 26, 2016 for his performances against Saint Mary's and Santa Clara. During the summer of 2016, Al-Jiboori spent time training with Super Rugby's Brumbies.

== International career ==
=== USA Junior All-Americans ===
Al-Jiboori represented the United States playing for the United States men's national under-20 team (Junior All-Americans) in the 2016 World Rugby Under 20 Trophy. During his tenure with the Junior All-Americans, Al-Jiboori served as the team's captain.

=== USA Collegiate All-Americans ===
Al-Jiboori played for the United States men's national under-23 team (Collegiate All-Americans) during their tour of Queensland in 2016.

=== USA Selects ===
In 2016, it was announced that Al-Jiboori had been selected for the USA Selects roster for the 2016 Americas Pacific Challenge. Al-Jiboori made his first start for the Selects on October 12, 2016, playing at flanker, in the Selects' 47–37 victory over Canada.

=== USA Eagles ===
Al-Jiboori made his debut with the USA Eagles on February 17, 2018, appearing as a substitute in the Eagles' 45–13 victory over Chile in the 2018 Americas Rugby Championship.

=== USA Eagles 7s ===
Al-Jiboori made his debut for the United States men's national rugby sevens team at the 2016 Singapore Sevens tournament. As of September 2018, Al-Jiboori has competed in 31 total matches for the Eagles in 7s, having scored his first two tries for the Eagles during the 2017–18 World Rugby Sevens Series.

== Club career ==
In addition to his international appearances representing the United States, Al-Jiboori has played club rugby for the Denver Barbarians and Bulldog Rugby.

After playing one match for the Major League Rugby (MLR) club San Diego Legion during the 2018 MLR season, Al-Jiboori signed a two-year deal with the Glendale Raptors ahead of the 2019 season. In April 2021 he signed with the Ealing Trailfinders. In February 2022, he signed with the Houston Sabercats of the MLR.

== Personal life ==
Malon Al-Jiboori has a younger brother, Tyren Al-Jiboori, who also plays rugby and competed for the United States at the 2018 Summer Youth Olympics. Their older brother, Michael Al-Jiboori, has also played rugby for the Denver Barbarians.
