= Pedro Rubiolo =

Argentine rugby union player (born 2002)

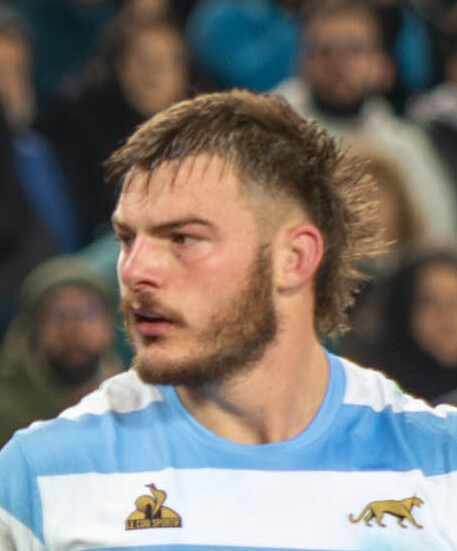
- Rubiolo in 2024
- Born: 21 December 2002 (age 23) Sante Fe, Argentina
- Height: 1.93 m (6 ft 4 in)
- Weight: 114 kg (251 lb; 17 st 13 lb)

Rugby union career
- Position(s): Lock, Flanker
- Current team: Bristol Bears
Youth career
- CRAR de Rafaela
Senior career
Years	Team	Apps	(Points)
2020-2022	Jaguares XV	14	(0)
2023-2024	Newcastle Falcons	21	(5)
2025-	Bristol Bears	3	(0)
- Correct as of 26 October 2024
International career
Years	Team	Apps	(Points)
2021	Argentina U20	4	(0)
2022–	Argentina	31	(10)
- Correct as of 22 November 2024

Pedro Rubiolo (born 21 December 2002) is an Argentine professional rugby union player who plays as a lock for Premiership Rugby club Bristol Bears and the Argentina national team.

== Club career ==
=== Jaguares ===
Rubiolo began his career at Club CRAR, Rafaela city, Santa Fe, Argentina before joining the Jaguares XV in the SLAR. Winning the competition in 2021.

=== Newcastle Falcons ===
In 2022, he signed a long-term deal with English Premiership side Newcastle Falcons, signing a two-and-a-half-year contract. He made his debut against Cardiff in the EPCR Challenge Cup.

=== Bristol Bears ===
He will join Bristol Bears on a three-year deal from the beginning of the 2025–26 season This deal was changed to a loan for the 2024–25 season, ahead of the permanent transfer, while he recovers from injury.

== International career ==
Rubiolo was named in the Argentina U20s squad for the 2021 tour of South Africa, starting in all 4 games. He has represented the Argentina XV twice playing in the Americas Pacific Challenge Starting in a 146–7 win over Paraguay A.

He made his debut for Argentina coming off the bench against South Africa in The Rugby Championship. He was named in the Argentina squad for the 2023 Rugby World Cup.

== Honours ==
Jaguarers XV

- Súper Liga Americana de Rugby: 2021

Argentina XV

- World Rugby Americas Pacific Challenge: 2021
