= Conor Kearns (rugby union) =

Irish-American rugby union player

- Born: Conor Kearns; 12 March 1993 (age 33) San Francisco, California, United States
- Height: 1.88 m (6 ft 2 in)
- Weight: 94 kg (14 st 11 lb; 207 lb)
- School: Glenstal Abbey School
- University: Trinity College Dublin; University of Oxford

Rugby union career
- Position(s): Wing, Centre, Fly-half
Amateur team(s)
Years	Team	Apps	(Points)
–	Old Crescent		
2011–2016	Dublin University Football Club		
2016	Munster A	1	
2017–2018	Oxford University RFC		
Senior career
Years	Team	Apps	(Points)
2018–2019	San Diego Legion	15	(5)
- Correct as of 25 February 2021
International career
Years	Team	Apps	(Points)
2013	United States U20	5	(0)
2016	Collegiate All-Americans	3	
2016	Irish Universities	1	
2018	USA Selects	3	(0)
- Correct as of 25 February 2021

Conor Kearns (born March 12, 1993) is an Irish-American rugby union player who last played wing, fullback and fly-half for the San Diego Legion, the USA under-20's and the USA Selects.

== Early life ==
Kearns was born in San Francisco to Irish parents originally from Dublin. When Kearns was still a child the family moved to Limerick where he would grow up playing with Old Crescent.

== University ==
Kearns completed a degree in Molecular Medicine and Immunology at Trinity College and competed with the university's rugby club in the AIL league. He went on to pursue a Master's in Pharmacology at the University of Oxford, where he also played for the rugby club in the famed Varsity match against Cambridge. Kearns captained the team in their 20–10 defeat to Cambridge at Twickenham in 2017. He also took part in their 38–16 victory in the 2018 Varsity Match. Kearns made an appearance for the Munster A side against the Ireland under-20s in April 2016.

== Major League Rugby ==
Kearns played on the wing in San Diego's 23–26 loss to Seattle in the 2019 Major League Rugby final.

== International ==
Kearns played five matches for the USA under-20's at the 2013 IRB Junior World Championship. Kearns also competed for the Irish Universities team in a 2016 match against an England Students side. Kearns was selected for the All-Americans three match tour of Australia in 2016, where he served as the team's starting fly-half in two of their three matches. Kearns made three appearances for the USA Selects during the 2018 Americas Pacific Challenge.
