= Cardinal Stadium (disambiguation) =

Cardinal Stadium, formerly known as Papa John's Cardinal Stadium, is a football stadium in Louisville, Kentucky, the current stadium of the Louisville Cardinals football team.

Cardinal Stadium may also refer to:

- Benedetti–Wehrli Stadium in Naperville, Illinois, which opened as Cardinal Stadium.
- Cardinals Field, a softball venue at University of the Incarnate Word in San Antonio, Texas.
- Cardinal Stadium (Washington, D.C.) at the Catholic University of America, Washington, D.C.
- Cardinal Stadium (1956), formerly known as Fairgrounds Stadium, a multipurpose stadium in Louisville, Kentucky and former home of the Louisville Cardinals football and baseball teams.
- Provost Umphrey Stadium, the stadium of Lamar University's football stadium located in Beaumont, Texas which opened as Cardinal Stadium.
- State Farm Stadium in Glendale, Arizona, the home of the NFL's Arizona Cardinals, which opened as Cardinals Stadium.
