= Josh Larsen =

Josh Larsen may refer to:

- Josh Larsen (speedway rider) (born 1972), American motorcycle speedway rider
- Josh Larsen (rugby union) (born 1994), Canadian rugby union player
