= Tim Maupin =

American rugby union player (b. 1989)

- Born: March 23, 1989 (age 37) Danville, California
- Height: 6 ft 1 in (1.85 m)
- Weight: 210 lb (95 kg)
- School: De La Salle High School
- University: Saint Mary's College

Rugby union career
- Position(s): Wing; Center
- Current team: NOLA Gold
Amateur team(s)
Years	Team	Apps	(Points)
2009–2013	Saint Mary's College		
2013	SFGG RFC		
2013	Olympic Club RFC		
2014–2018	Dublin University		
- Correct as of November 8, 2018
Senior career
Years	Team	Apps	(Points)
2018–	New Orleans Gold	22	(30)
- Correct as of 25 December 2020
International career
Years	Team	Apps	(Points)
2013–	USA Selects	9	(30)
2013–	United States	9	(5)
- Correct as of 25 December 2020

Tim Maupin (born March 23, 1989) is a rugby union player who plays for NOLA Gold in Major League Rugby (MLR) and for the United States men's national team internationally. He also has played for the USA Selects.

== Early life ==
Maupin was born on March 23, 1989, in Danville, California. He attended De La Salle High School, graduating in 2007. While in high school, Maupin played rugby and football, playing at quarterback for his high school team. After high school, Maupin attended Saint Mary's College. There, he played for the university's rugby teams and graduated with a bachelor's degree in sociology in 2013. After playing at Saint Mary's, Maupin played rugby for San Francisco Golden Gate during the summer of 2013 before joining the Olympic Club in San Francisco later that year. In 2014, Maupin moved to Dublin, Ireland, playing rugby for the Dublin University Football Club through early 2018. While with the team, he started at wing in the 2016 edition of The Colours Match. While in Ireland, Maupin served as a rugby coach and house master at Blackrock College in 2014 and 2015.

== Club career ==
Prior to the start of the 2018 season, it was announced that Maupin had signed with the New Orleans Gold of Major League Rugby. Maupin made his debut with the Gold on April 21, 2018, starting at center in the Gold's 35–26 victory over Houston. Maupin scored his first try for the Gold on June 9, 2018, starting at wing in a 39–22 loss to San Diego. Maupin re-signed with the Gold for 2019 season.

== International career ==
=== USA Selects ===
Maupin made his debut with the USA Selects at the 2013 Americas Rugby Championship, scoring two tries in three appearances. Maupin also played for the Selects at the Americas Pacific Challenge in 2017 and 2018.

=== USA Eagles ===
Maupin made his debut with the USA Eagles on November 16, 2013, starting at wing in the Eagles' 25–23 victory over Georgia in Rustavi.
