= 2018 Major League Rugby final =

- Event: 2018 Major League Rugby season
Glendale Raptors	Seattle Seawolves
(Colorado)	(Washington (state))
19	23
- Date: July 7, 2018
- Venue: Torero Stadium, San Diego, California
- Man of the Match: Vili Tolutaʻu
- Referee: Scott Green (United States)
- Attendance: 2,901

The 2018 Major League Rugby final was the championship match of the inaugural season of Major League Rugby (MLR), a rugby union club competition in the United States. It was played on July 7, 2018, at Torero Stadium in San Diego, California, between the Glendale Raptors and the Seattle Seawolves. Seattle won the match 23–19 to take their first title.

The Glendale and Seattle teams finished first and second in the regular season, respectively, and advanced to the MLR Championship Series, contesting the semifinals against San Diego and Utah.

== Background ==
Major League Rugby was established in 2017 and began play in April 2018.

Seattle and Glendale played each other twice during the regular season, with Glendale winning both matches.

== Venue ==
Torero Stadium, home field of Major League Rugby team San Diego Legion, was selected as the venue for the final before the beginning of the Championship Series playoffs. The stadium with a seating capacity of 6,000 on the campus of the University of San Diego is also home to the various athletics teams of the university.

== Broadcasting ==
The match was broadcast on CBS Sports Network. Dan Power served as the play by play commentator for CBS and was joined by color analysts Brian Hightower and Peter Steinberg.

== Match ==
=== Details ===
July 7	Glendale Raptors	19–23	Seattle Seawolves	Torero Stadium, San Diego, California
9:00 pm EDT (UTC−04)	Try: Fenoglio (2) 13' c, 50' m Campbell 56' c Con: Magie (2/3) 13', 57'	Report	Try: Barkwill 23' m Rasileka 58' m, Hattingh 61' c Con: Smith (1/3) 62'; Pen: Smith (2/3) 9', 67'	Attendance: 2,901; Referee: Scott Green (United States)

Glendale Raptors	Seattle Seawolves

Team details

FB	15	(United States) Maximo de Achaval
RW	14	(United States) Harley Davidson
OC	13	(United States) Chad London	(substituted off) 46'
IC	12	(United States) Bryce Campbell
LW	11	(United States) Mika Kruse
FH	10	(United States) Will Magie
SH	9	(United States) Shaun Davies (c)
N8	8	(Australia) Sam Figg
OF	7	(United States) John Quill
BF	6	(United States) Peter Dahl	(substituted off) 57'
RL	5	(United States) Ben Landry	(substituted off) 57'
LL	4	(United States) Kody O'Neil	(substituted off) 62'
TP	3	(United States) Kelepi Fifita
HK	2	(United States) Zach Fenoglio
LP	1	(United States) Blake Rogers	(substituted off) 68'
Replacements:
PR	16	(Australia) Luke White	(substituted on) 68'
PR	17	(United States) Nick Kwasniewski
HK	18	(United States) Dylan Fawsitt	(substituted on) 57'
LK	19	(United States) Connor Cook	(substituted on) 62'
FL	20	(Georgia (country)) Grigor Kerdikoshvili	(substituted on) 57'
SH	21	(New Zealand) Mickey Bateman
CE	22	(United States) Ata Malifa	(substituted on) 46'
OB	23	(United States) Nick Johnson
Coach:
(United States) David Williams

FB	15	(England) Mathew Turner
RW	14	(United States) Sequoyah Burke-Combs
OC	13	(Fiji) William Rasileka
IC	12	(United States) Shalom Suniula (c)
LW	11	(United States) Peter Tiberio
FH	10	(Australia) Peter Smith
SH	9	(Canada) Phil Mack
N8	8	(South Africa) Riekert Hattingh
OF	7	(United States) Vili Tolutaʻu	(substituted off) 76'
BF	6	(United States) Eric Duechle
RL	5	(Canada) Cam Polson
LL	4	(United States) Taylor Krumrei	(substituted off) 57'
TP	3	(Australia) Tim Metcher	(substituted off) 59'
HK	2	(Canada) Ray Barkwill	(substituted off) 62'
LP	1	(United States) Olive Kilifi	(substituted off) 57'
Replacements:
HK	16	(United States) Mike Shepherd	(substituted on) 62'
PR	17	(United States) John Hayden	(substituted on) 59'
PR	18	(United States) Kellen Gordon	(substituted on) 57'
LK	19	(United States) Cole van Harn	(substituted on) 76'
LF	20	(United States) Aladdin Schirmer	(substituted on) 57'
FL	21	(South Korea) Andre Coquillard
OB	22	(United States) Jeremy Misailegalu
OB	23	(Canada) Mozac Samson
Coach:
(Canada) Phil Mack

Most Valuable Player:
Vili Tolutaʻu (Seattle)

Assistant Referees:
Adam Leal (England)
Derek Summers (United States)
Television Match Official:
Marc Nelson (United States)

=== Highlights ===
The champion Seattle Seawolves was awarded the "America's Championship Shield", an oversized 80-pound (36 kg) metal shield of the MLR logo, which they hoisted. Seawolves flanker Vili Tolutaʻu was named the MLR Championship Series "MVP", equivalent to man of the match. For his efforts, he received a Shinola Detroit American Made watch.
