= Dylan Audsley =

United States rugby union player (b. 1994)

- Born: January 15, 1994 (age 32) London, England
- Height: 5 ft 11 in (180 cm)
- Weight: 195 lb (88 kg)
- School: Chaparral High School
- University: Saint Mary's College

Rugby union career
- Position(s): Centre, Fullback
- Current team: San Diego Legion
Senior career
Years	Team	Apps	(Points)
2018–2021	San Diego Legion	26	(63)
- Correct as of May 30, 2022
International career
Years	Team	Apps	(Points)
2013	United States U20	4	(5)
2016	United States U23	3	(27)
2018	USA Selects	3	(28)
2018–	United States	8	(10)
- Correct as of March 2, 2019

Dylan Audsley (born January 15, 1994) is an American rugby union player who plays center and fullback for the San Diego Legion in Major League Rugby (MLR) and the United States men's national team.

In 2016, Audsley was the first recipient of the Rudy Scholz Award, given to the best men’s college rugby player in the United States.

== Early life ==
Audsley was born in the United Kingdom, the son of an American mother. He moved to the United States and attended Notre Dame High School and Chaparral High School, graduating from the latter in 2012. Audsley then attended Saint Mary's College where he led the rugby team to a national championship in 2017. Audsley scored 25 of the Gaels' 30 points in their 30–24 national championship game victory over Life University. While at St. Mary's, Audsley was the first recipient of the Rudy Scholz Award, an award given to the best men’s college rugby player in the United States and named after two-time Olympic gold medalist and World War I and World War II veteran Rudy Scholz. Audsley graduated from St. Mary's in 2017 with a degree in Art History.

== Club career ==
It was announced in January 2018 that Audsley would be joining the San Diego Legion for Major League Rugby's inaugural 2018 season. Audsley made his debut for the Legion on April 29 in a 31–24 victory over Utah, scoring on his only conversion attempt.

== International career ==
=== USA Junior All-Americans ===
Audsley made his debut in international play with the United States men's national under-20 team (Junior All-Americans) in the 2013 IRB Junior World Championship. Audsley made his first appearance for the Junior All-Americans as a 68th minute substitute in a 45–3 defeat to France on June 9. Audsley made his first start for the Junior All-Americans at fullback in a 109–0 loss to England on June 13. Audsley scored his first points for the Junior All-Americans on a penalty goal in a 39–3 defeat to Scotland on June 18. Audsley concluded the tournament by scoring a conversion for the Junior All-Americans in their 46–12 loss to Fiji on June 23. Audsley was expected to be selected to represent the United States in the 2014 IRB Junior World Rugby Trophy, but he was unable to participate due to an injury.

=== USA Collegiate All-Americans ===
Audsley was selected to represent the United States in the Men's Collegiate All-Americans' (MCAAs) 2016 tour of Queensland, Australia. Audsley made his debut for the MCAAs as a substitute, scoring a conversion, in their August 6 victory over a Darling Downs Select Side. Audsley scored an additional 10 points for the MCAAs in their August 10 match against Brothers Rugby Club. Audsley concluded the Queensland tour by scoring 15 points for the MCAAs in their August 14 match against the Queensland Premier Barbarians.

=== USA Selects ===
In September 2018, it was announced that Audsley had been selected for the USA Selects roster for the 2018 Americas Pacific Challenge.

=== USA Eagles ===
Audsley made his debut with the USA Eagles on February 3, 2018, appearing as a substitute in the Eagles' 17–10 victory over Argentina XV in the 2018 Americas Rugby Championship (ARC). Audsley earned his first cap with the Eagles on February 10, 2018, starting at center in the Eagles' 29–10 victory over Canada in the ARC. Audsley scored his first two tries for the Eagles in the Eagles' 45–13 victory over Chile on February 17, 2018. Audsley was named to the Eagles' roster for the 2018 mid-year tests; he is expected to play at fullback while Mike Te'o recovers from injury.
