= Nakai Penny =

Canadian rugby union player

- Born: Nakai Penny; 4 April 1996 (age 30) Penticton, British Columbia
- Height: 1.90 m (6 ft 3 in)
- Weight: 98 kg (216 lb)
- School: Penticton Secondary
- University: University of British Columbia

Rugby union career
- Position: Flanker
- Current team: Seattle Seawolves
Amateur team(s)
Years	Team	Apps	(Points)
2014-17	UBC Thunderbirds		
2017	Westshore RFC		
Senior career
Years	Team	Apps	(Points)
2018-	Seattle Seawolves	25	(15)
- Correct as of 5 February 2022
Provincial / State sides
Years	Team	Apps	(Points)
2017	British Columbia Bears	1	(0)
International career
Years	Team	Apps	(Points)
2016	Canada U20	1	(0)
2019-	Canada	3	(0)
- Correct as of 23 February 2019

Nakai Penny (born 4 April 1996) is a Canadian rugby union player who plays for Seattle Seawolves in Major League Rugby (MLR). His usual position is flanker (As of 2018).

Penny previously played for the University of British Columbia Thunderbirds and Westshore RFC in the BC Premier League competition.

== Early life ==
Penny was born in Penticton, British Columbia in the southern interior of British Columbia. He played his high school rugby with the Penticton Secondary Lakers. In 2014 Penny moved to Vancouver to play for the UBC Thunderbirds rugby squad.

== Rugby career ==
Penny played three seasons with the University of British Columbia, winning three consecutive Rounsefell Cups, the British Columbia provincial championship. Following his career with UBC, Penny suited up with Westshore RFC in the British Columbia Premiership. In 2017 he was selected to play for the BC Bears squad in the Canadian Rugby Championship. BC went on to win their first MacTier Cup in eight years.

In 2016, Penny was selected to represent the Canadian under-20 side in the 2016 World Rugby Under 20 Trophy qualifier against the United States. He started at openside flanker for the Canadians. The American side converted a long range penalty on the last play of the game to take a 19-18 win.

On 3 January 2018 it was announced that Penny would be joining the Seattle Seawolves for their inaugural season in Major League Rugby.

== Club statistics ==
As of 11 February 2022

Season	Team	Games	Starts	Sub	Tries	Cons	Pens	Drops	Points	Yel	Red
MLR 2018	Seattle Seawolves	5	3	2	0	0	0	0	0	0	0
MLR 2019	Seattle Seawolves	12	10	2	1	0	0	0	5	0	0
MLR 2020	Seattle Seawolves	5	5	0	2	0	0	0	10	1	0
MLR 2021	Seattle Seawolves	3	1	2	0	0	0	0	0	0	0
MLR 2022	Seattle Seawolves	2	2	0	1	0	0	0	5	0	0
Total		27	21	6	4	0	0	0	20	1	0
