= Vili Tolutaʻu =

American rugby union player (b. 1994)

- Born: January 26, 1994 (age 32) Kahului, Hawaii
- Height: 6 ft 0 in (1.83 m)
- Weight: 236 lb (107 kg)
- School: Baldwin High School
- University: Central Washington University

Rugby union career
- Position(s): Hooker; Flanker
- Current team: New England Free Jacks
Amateur team(s)
Years	Team	Apps	(Points)
–c. 2012	Maui Warriors		
- Correct as of September 19, 2018
Senior career
Years	Team	Apps	(Points)
2018–2020	Seattle Seawolves	17	(25)
2021-	New England Free Jacks		
- Correct as of 25 February 2021
International career
Years	Team	Apps	(Points)
- United States U19
2013–2014	United States U20	7	(5)
- United States U23
2018–	USA Selects	3	(5)
2018–	United States	1	(0)
- Correct as of 29 January 2021
National sevens team
Years	Team		Comps
	USA Falcons		1
- Correct as of September 19, 2018

Vili Tolutaʻu (born January 26, 1994) is an American rugby union player who plays as a forward for the New England Free Jacks in Major League Rugby (MLR). He also represents America playing for the United States men's national team.

Prior to joining the Free Jacks, Tolutaʻu played for the Seattle Seawolves for 2 full seasons and the shortened 2020 MLR season. Tolutaʻu was a part of two-time championship winning Seawolves in 2018 and 2019, as well as being the MVP of the Championship Match in 2018.

Tolutaʻu previously represented the United States at the international level with several age-grade sides. Tolutaʻu also previously played for the USA Falcons, the developmental side for the United States men's national rugby sevens team.

== Early life ==
Vili Tolutaʻu was born on January 26, 1994. Tolutaʻu attended Baldwin High School and began playing rugby with the Maui Warriors as a teenager. After graduating from Baldwin High School, Tolutaʻu attended Central Washington University, playing for the school's rugby teams and graduating in June 2018 with a bachelor's degree in construction management.

== Club career ==
It was announced in April 2018 that Tolutaʻu had signed with the Seattle Seawolves for Major League Rugby's (MLR) inaugural 2018 season. Tolutaʻu made his debut for the Seawolves on April 23, appearing as a first half substitute in a 39–23 victory over San Diego. Tolutaʻu scored his first try for the Seawolves on April 29, starting at flanker in a 19–15 defeat to Glendale. Tolutaʻu was named Most Valuable Player (equivalent to man of the match) in the 2018 Major League Rugby final, as the Seawolves won the championship match 23–19. Tolutaʻu was also named to the All-MLR First Team, at flanker, for the 2018 season.

== International career ==
=== USA High School All-Americans ===
Tolutaʻu first represented the United States as a member of the United States men's national under-19 team (High School All-Americans) for two consecutive years, while a member of the Maui Warriors.

=== USA Junior All-Americans ===
Tolutaʻu represented the United States playing for the United States men's national under-20 team (Junior All-Americans) in the 2013 IRB Junior World Championship.

=== USA Collegiate All-Americans ===
Tolutaʻu played for the United States men's national under-23 team (Collegiate All-Americans) for two years.

=== USA Selects ===
In September 2018, it was announced that Tolutaʻu had been selected for the USA Selects roster for the 2018 Americas Pacific Challenge (APC). Tolutaʻu made his debut with the Selects on October 6, 2018, appearing as a substitute and scoring a try, in the Selects' 39–30 defeat to Tonga in the APC.

=== USA Eagles ===
Tolutaʻu made his debut with the USA Eagles on June 23, 2018, appearing as a substitute (playing at flanker), in the Eagles' 42–17 victory against Canada in a mid-year test.

=== USA Falcons ===
Tolutaʻu has competed for the USA Falcons, the developmental side for the United States men's national rugby sevens team, at the Las Vegas Invitational Tournament.
