= Ryan Matyas =

American rugby union player

- Born: 24 December 1990 (age 35) Tucson, Arizona
- Height: 6 ft 0 in (1.83 m)
- Weight: 195 lb (13 st 13 lb; 88 kg)
- School: Tucson High Magnet School
- University: University of Arizona

Rugby union career
- Position(s): Wing, Fullback
Amateur team(s)
Years	Team	Apps	(Points)
2011–2012	Tondu RFC		
2013–2016	Old Blue R.F.C.		
–	Tucson Magpies		
–	Tempe Old Devils		
–	East Coast Bays RFC		
–	North Harbour		
Senior career
Years	Team	Apps	(Points)
2016	San Diego Breakers	10	(10)
2018–	San Diego Legion	23	(25)
- Correct as of 28 December 2020
International career
Years	Team	Apps	(Points)
2018–	USA Selects	3	(15)
2016–2022	United States	13	(30)
- Correct as of 16 September 2021
National sevens team
Years	Team		Comps
2013–2014	United States		7

Ryan Matyas (born December 24, 1990) is an American rugby union player who plays as a wing for the San Diego Legion of Major League Rugby (MLR) and for the United States national rugby union team.

== Career ==
Matyas played college rugby for the Arizona Wildcats.

Matyas played with the United States national rugby sevens team under head coach Matt Hawkins. He earned a full-time contract for the 2013–14 season, playing in six tournaments in the 2013–14 IRB Sevens World Series. After the season, the U.S. brought in a new head coach, Mike Friday, and Matyas's contract with the U.S. sevens team was not renewed for the 2014–15 season.

Matyas debuted for the U.S. national rugby fifteens team on February 20, 2016, at the 2016 Americas Rugby Championship, coming on as a substitute against Chile. Matyas scored his first try for the U.S. on February 18, 2017 against Canada at the 2017 Americas Rugby Championship. Matyas played for the U.S. during the summer 2017 matches against Canada, where U.S. victory qualified the team for the 2019 Rugby World Cup.

Matyas played for the San Diego Breakers of PRO Rugby during the competition's inaugural 2016 season, but the competition folded after one year. Matyas signed with the San Diego Legion of Major League Rugby for the competition's inaugural 2018 season.

In September 2018, it was announced that Matyas had been selected for the USA Selects roster for the 2018 Americas Pacific Challenge.

On October 23, 2021, while playing for the United States national rugby union team, Ryan Matyas became one of two American players to have scored against the All Blacks.

On May 5, 2022, Ryan Matyas announced his retirement from international rugby.
