= 2018 World Rugby Americas Pacific Challenge =

Rugby tournament

2018 Americas Pacific Challenge
Tournament details
- Date: 6–14 October 2018
- Countries: Argentina XV; Canada A Samoa A Tonga A Uruguay A USA Selects
- Teams: 6

Final positions
- Champions: Samoa A
- Runner-up: Argentina XV

Tournament statistics
- Matches played: 9
- Tries scored: 69 (7.67 per match)
- Attendance: 5,500 (611 per match)
- Top scorer(s): (Uruguay) Federico Favaro (35) (Tonga) Saia Fililava (35) (Samoa) D’Angelo Leuila (35)
- Most tries: (Samoa) Johnny Vaili (4)

The 2018 World Rugby Americas Pacific Challenge was the third tournament of the Americas Pacific Challenge, which is a development competition for the Americas and Pacific island nations. The competition was hosted by Uruguay with all games played at the 14,000 capacity stadium Estadio Charrúa in Montevideo. Samoa A won the tournament for the first time, winning all three of their matches.

== Format ==
With six teams in the tournament and a limitation of three matches per team, a "split pool" format was used. The field was split into two pools, with teams in one pool only playing the teams in the other. The competing teams were:

Pool A

- Argentina XV
- Tonga A
- Uruguay A

Pool B

- Canada A
- Samoa A
- USA Selects

== Table ==
Final standings for combined pools:

Rank	Team	Games				Points			Tries		Try Bonus	Losing Bonus	Table Points
Rank	Team	P	W	D	L	PF	PA	Diff	TF	TA	Try Bonus	Losing Bonus	Table Points
1	Samoa A	3	3	0	0	97	72	+25	12	11	2	0	14
2	Argentina XV	3	2	0	1	131	56	+75	20	7	3	1	12
3	Uruguay A	3	2	0	1	94	77	+17	11	10	3	0	11
4	Tonga A	3	1	0	2	85	85	0	10	11	1	1	6
5	Canada A	3	1	0	2	58	111	-53	9	13	1	0	5
6	USA Selects	3	0	0	3	63	127	-64	7	17	0	0	0
Updated: 21 January 2021; Source: Four points for a win, two for a draw, and no points for a bye. One bonus point for scoring four or more tries in a match. One bonus point for losing by seven or less. The tie-break mechanism for teams finishing on the same table points has not been sourced.

== Fixtures ==
All times are local UYT (UTC-03)

The matches were announced on 22 August 2018.

=== Round 1 ===
6 October 2018	Argentina XV	31–36	Samoa A	Estadio Charrúa, Montevideo
11:00	Try: Daireaux; Herrera; Zapata; Carreras; Portillo; Con: Bonilla (2/2); Miotti (1/3)	Report	Try: Tapili; Vaili; Samuelu; Tapu; Con: Leuila (1/3); Fa’apale (1/1); Pen: Leuila (4/4)	Attendance: 300; Referee: Shuhei Kubo (JRFU)

6 October 2018	Tonga A	39–30	USA Selects	Estadio Charrúa, Montevideo
13:30	Try: Ika (2); Finau; Lave; Hafoka; Con: Fililava (4/5); Pen: Fililava (2/3)	Report	Try: Daly; Maupin; Toluta’u; Con: Audsley (3/3); Pen: Audsley (3/4)	Attendance: 500; Referee: Pali Deluca (ARU)

6 October 2018	Uruguay A	35–21	Canada A	Estadio Charrúa, Montevideo
16:00	Try: Penalty try Diana; Leivas; Con: Favaro (2/3); Pen: Favaro (3/3)	Report	Try: Fraser; Parfrey; McRorie; Con: du Toit (3/3); Pen: du Toit (0/2)	Attendance: 1,200; Referee: Derek Summers (USAR)

=== Round 2 ===
10 October 2018	Tonga A	15–23	Samoa A	Estadio Charrúa, Montevideo
11:00	Try: Kioa; Hafoka; Con: Fililava (1/2); Pen: Fililava (1/2)	Report	Try: Matamu; Matamu (2); Con: Leuila (1/2); Fa’apale (0/1); Pen: Leuila (2/2)	Attendance: 200; Referee: Pali Deluca (UAR)

10 October 2018	Uruguay A	33–18	USA Selects	Estadio Charrúa, Montevideo
13:30	Try: Arata (2); Favaro; Vilaseca; Con: Favaro (2/4); Pen: Favaro (3/3)	Report	Try: Matyas; Audsley; Con: Audsley (1/2); Pen: Audsley (2/2); Drop: Kearns (0/1)	Attendance: 1,200; Referee: Shuhei Kubo (JRFU)

10 October 2018	Argentina XV	45–5	Canada A	Estadio Charrúa, Montevideo
16:00	Try: Cordero (2); Segura (2); Penalty try Osadczuk del Prete; Con: Miotti (3/4); Bonilla (1/2)	Report	Try: Sauder; Con: McRorie (0/1)	Attendance: 400; Referee: Joaquín Montes (URU)

=== Round 3 ===
14 October 2018	Tonga A	31–32	Canada A	Estadio Charrúa, Montevideo
11:00	Try: Folau; Finau (2); Con: Fililava (2/3); Pen: Fililava (3/5); Drop: Fililava (1/1)	Report	Try: Barkwill; Lloyd (3); Penalty try Con: McRorie (1/4); Pen: McRorie (1/1)	Attendance: 150; Referee: Derek Summers (USAR)

14 October 2018	Argentina XV	55–15	USA Selects	Estadio Charrúa, Montevideo
13:30	Try: Bonilla; Favre; Herrera; Brarda; Osadczuk; Grondona; Mensa; Bruni; Con: Bonilla (4/5); Miotti (2/3); Pen: Bonilla (1/1)	Report	Try: Matyas (2); Con: Audsley (1/2); Pen: Audsley (1/1)	Attendance: 250; Referee: Joaquín Montes (URU)

14 October 2018	Uruguay A	26–38	Samoa A	Estadio Charrúa, Montevideo
16:00	Try: Kessler (2); Penalty try Ardao; Con: Favaro (2/3); Pen: Favaro (0/1)	Report	Try: Tino; Vaili; Samuelu; Tusitala; Mapu; Con: Leuila (5/5); Pen: Leuila (1/1); Drop: Fa’apale (0/1)	Attendance: 1,300; Referee: Pali Deluca (UAR)

== See also ==
- 2018 end-of-year rugby union internationals
- Americas Rugby Championship
- World Rugby Pacific Challenge
