= Jeff Makapelu =

Samoan rugby union player

Jeff (Lapana) Makapelu
- Born: Jeff Lapana Makapelu; 5 August 1987 (age 39) Motootua, Samoa
- Height: 5 ft 11 in (1.80 m)
- Weight: 14 st 2 lb (90 kg)
- School: Bishop Viard College

Rugby union career
- Position: Centre
Amateur team(s)
Years	Team	Apps	(Points)
- Tawa
Senior career
Years	Team	Apps	(Points)
2010-	RC Timişoara		
International career
Years	Team	Apps	(Points)
- Samoa (A)

Jeff Lapana Makapelu (born 5 August 1987 in Motootua, Samoa) is a Samoan rugby union footballer. A centre, he formerly played for RC Timişoara in the Romanian Rugby Championship. He also plays for the București Wolves in the European Challenge Cup, and was a former player for Marist Rugby Club in Samoa. In 2016 he was selected for samoa A for the Americas Pacific Challenge.

After returning to New Zealand he resumed playing club rugby for Tawa RFC after formerly playing for Northern United. In this year Tawa RFC won both the top competitions in Wellington club rugby the Swindale Shield and Jubilee Cup.
