= Lucas Albornoz =

Canada international rugby union player

- Born: 29 April 1991 (age 35) Vancouver, British Columbia
- Height: 193 cm (6 ft 4 in)
- Weight: 114 kg (17 st 13 lb; 251 lb)

Rugby union career
- Position: Lock
Senior career
Years	Team	Apps	(Points)
2018	Northland	2	(0)
2021-present	Houston SaberCats	10	(0)
International career
Years	Team	Apps	(Points)
2017	Canada	1	(0)

Lucas Albornoz is a Canadian rugby union player for Northland of the Mitre 10 Cup. He has played for the Canadian national team.
