= Marcelo Torrealba =

Chilean rugby union player

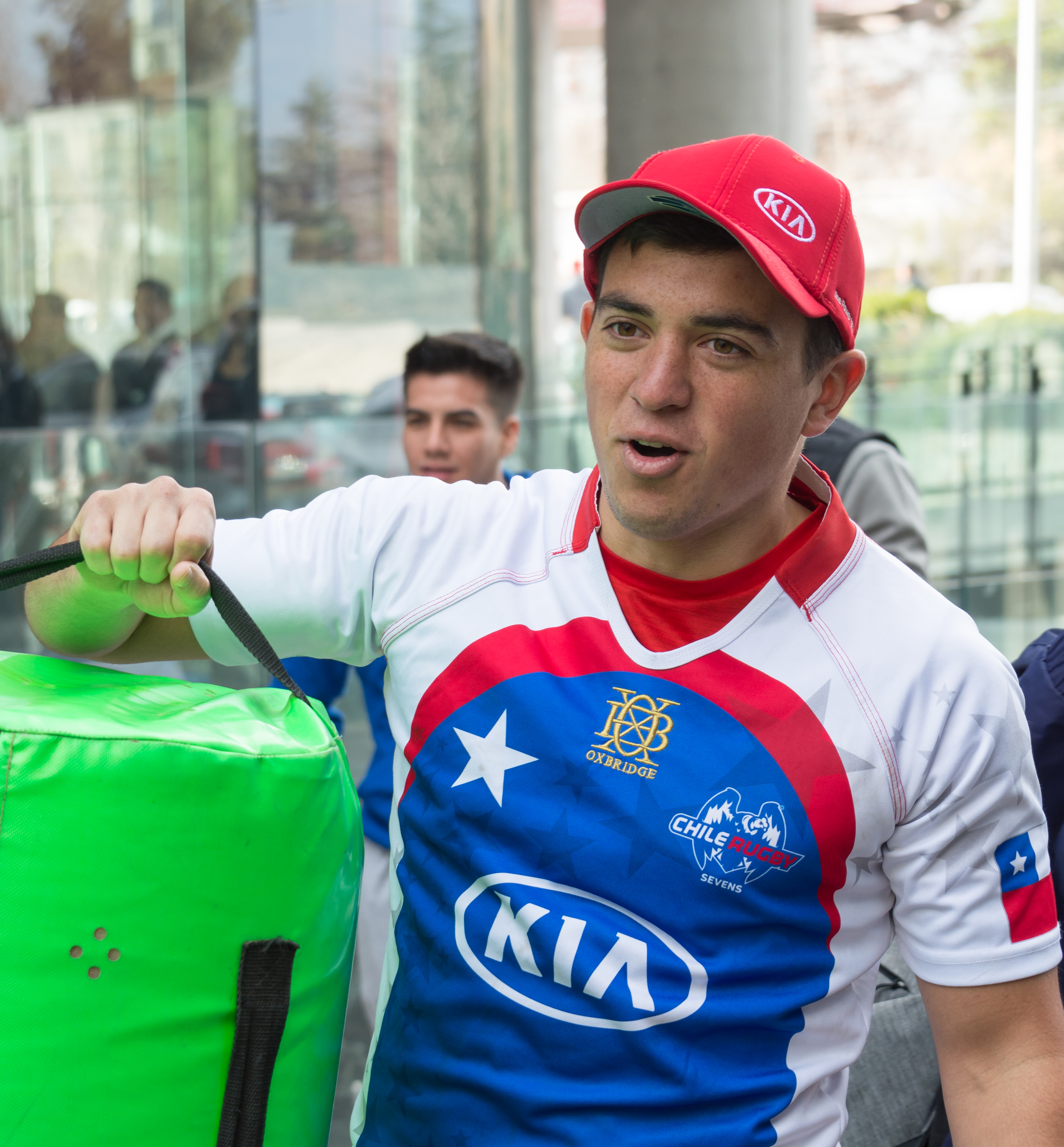
- Full name: Marcelo Diego Torrealba Otero
- Born: 6 May 1996 (age 30) Santiago, Chile
- Height: 1.70 m (5 ft 7 in)
- Weight: 78 kg (172 lb; 12 st 4 lb)
- School: The Grange School
- University: Universidad Nacional Andres Bello

Rugby union career
- Position: Scrum-half
- Current team: Selknam
Senior career
Years	Team	Apps	(Points)
2019–2021	Austin Gilgronis	22	(25)
2022–	Selknam	14	(7)
- Correct as of 28 August 2023
International career
Years	Team	Apps	(Points)
2020	Chile A	3	(0)
2021–	Chile	12	(15)
- Correct as of 28 August 2023
National sevens team
Years	Team		Comps
2016–	Chile		8
- Correct as of 28 August 2023

Marcelo Diego Torrealba Otero (born 6 May 1996) is a Chilean professional rugby union player who plays as a scrum-half for Super Rugby Americas club Selknam and the Chile national team.
