= 2021 World Rugby Americas Pacific Challenge =

2021 Pacific American Rugby Championship

2021 Americas Pacific Challenge
Tournament details
- Date: 22–30 October 2021
- Countries: Argentina XV; Brazil A Chile A Paraguay A Uruguay A USA Selects
- Teams: 6

The 2021 World Rugby Americas Pacific Challenge was the fourth tournament of the Americas Pacific Challenge, a development competition for the Americas and Pacific island nations. However, due to travel restriction only Americas countries featured, with Paraguay replacing Samoa A. The competition was hosted by Uruguay with all games played at the 14,000 capacity stadium Estadio Charrúa in Montevideo.

== Format ==
Six teams participated in the tournament. A "split pool" format was used. The field was split into two pools, with teams in one pool only playing the teams in the other. The competing teams were as follows:

Pool A

- Argentina XV
- Brazil A
- Chile A

Pool B

- Paraguay A
- Uruguay A
- USA Selects

== Table ==
Final standings for combined pools:

Rank	Team	Games				Points			Tries		Try Bonus	Losing Bonus	Table Points
Rank	Team	P	W	D	L	PF	PA	Diff	TF	TA	Try Bonus	Losing Bonus	Table Points
1	Argentina XV	2	2	0	0	170	24	+146	25	3	2	0	10
2	Chile A	3	2	0	1	108	38	+70	13	5	1	1	10
3	Brazil A	3	2	0	1	83	67	+16	10	8	2	0	10
4	Uruguay A	3	2	0	1	69	53	+16	8	7	0	1	9
5	USA Selects	2	0	0	2	34	62	-28	4	6	0	0	0
6	Paraguay A	3	0	0	3	26	266	-240	4	40	0	0	0
Updated: 6 October 2021; Source: Four points for a win, two for a draw, and no points for a bye. One bonus point for scoring four or more tries in a match. One bonus point for losing by seven or less. The tie-break mechanism for teams finishing on the same table points has not been sourced.

== Fixtures ==
All times are local UYT (UTC-03)

=== Round 1 ===
22 October 2021
12:30

Chile A	62 - 0	Paraguay A
	Report

Estadio Charrúa, Montevideo
Referee: Tomas Bertazza (Argentina)

22 October 2021
15:30

Argentina XV	cancelled	USA Selects

Estadio Charrúa, Montevideo
Referee: Cauã Ricardo (Brazil)

22 October 2021
18:30

Brazil	12 - 28	Uruguay A
	Report

Estadio Charrúa, Montevideo
Referee: Gonzalo de Achaval (Argentina)

=== Round 2 ===
26 October 2021
12:30

Brazil A	33 - 20	USA Selects
	Report

Estadio Charrúa, Montevideo
Referee: Matias Esteban (Uruguay)

26 October 2021
15:30

Argentina XV	146 - 7	Paraguay A
	Report

Estadio Charrúa, Montevideo
Referee: Frank Mendez (Chile)

26 October 2021
18:30

Chile A	17 - 24	Uruguay A
	Report

Estadio Charrúa, Montevideo
Referee: Tomas Bertazza (Argentina)

=== Round 3 ===
30 October 2021
12:30

Brazil A	58–19	Paraguay A
	Report

Estadio Charrúa, Montevideo
Referee: Frank Mendez (Chile)

30 October 2021
15:30

Chile A	29–14	USA Selects
	Report

Estadio Charrúa, Montevideo
Referee: Gonzalo de Achaval (Argentina)

30 October 2021
18:30

Argentina XV	24–17	Uruguay A
	Report

Estadio Charrúa, Montevideo
Referee: Cauã Ricardo (Brazil)

== See also ==
- 2021 end-of-year rugby union internationals
- Americas Rugby Championship
- World Rugby Pacific Challenge
