= Tomas Quinlan =

Irish rugby union player

- Born: 27 January 1995 (age 31) Cork, Ireland
- Height: 5 ft 10 in (1.78 m)
- Weight: 185 lb (84 kg)
- School: Christian Brothers
- University: Cork Institute of Technology

Rugby union career
- Position: Fly-Half
Youth career
- 2016: Munster Rugby
Amateur team(s)
| Years | Team | Apps | (Points) |
| 2016-2018 | Cork Constitution | | |
Senior career
| Years | Team | Apps | (Points) |
| 2018–2019 | RC Narbonne | | |
| 2020 | Colorado Raptors | | |
International career
| Years | Team | Apps | (Points) |
| 2015–2016 | Ireland U20 | | |

Tomas Quinlan (born 27 January 1995) is an Irish professional rugby union player. He previously played as a fly-half for the Colorado Raptors in Major League Rugby (MLR).

He previously played for RC Narbonne in the Pro D2 league and for Ireland U20s internationally.
