= Ope Peleseuma =

Opetera Peleseuma
- Born: 11 February 1992 (age 34) Apia, Tuamasaga, Samoa
- Height: 180 cm (5 ft 11 in)
- Weight: 88 kg (13 st 12 lb; 194 lb)

Rugby union career
- Position: Centre
Provincial / State sides
Years	Team	Apps	(Points)
2012, 14–	Wellington	9	(0)
2013	Taranaki	4	(5)
- Correct as of 13 October 2014
Super Rugby
Years	Team	Apps	(Points)
2013	Hurricanes	1	(0)
- Correct as of 15 July 2013
International career
Years	Team	Apps	(Points)
2012	New Zealand under-20	4	(0)
–	Samoa	1	(0)
- Correct as of 26 November 2016

Ope Peleseuma (born 11 February 1992) is a rugby union footballer who plays as a midfielder for Wellington in the ITM Cup. His performances at domestic level were rewarded when he was named in the Hurricanes Wider Training Squad for the 2013 Super Rugby season.

Peleseuma represented New Zealand Under 20 in the 2012 IRB Junior World Championship in South Africa.
