= Cardinal Stadium (Washington, D.C.) =

Stadium in Washington, D.C., U.S.

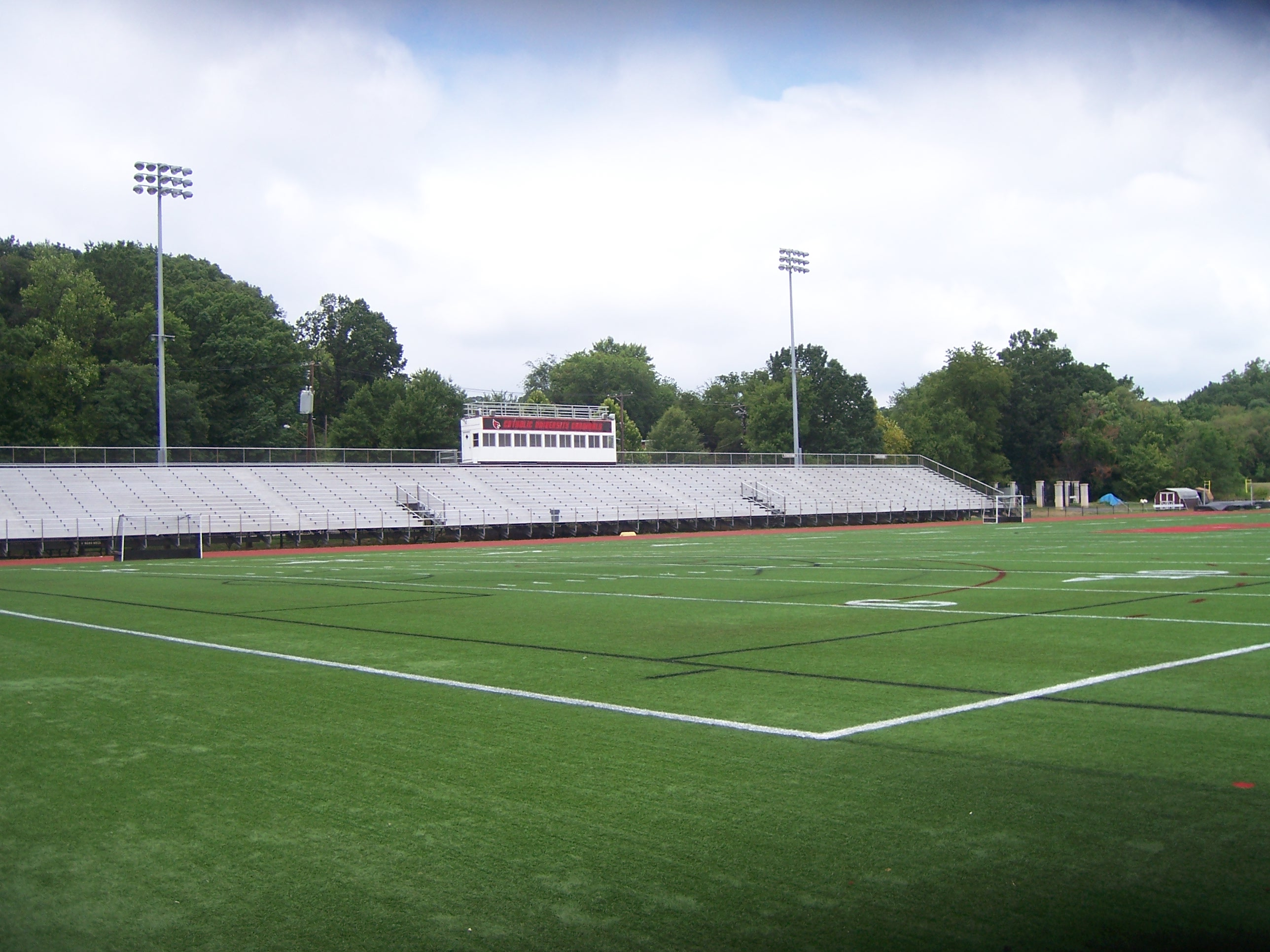
- The stadium as seen in 2011
- Interactive map of Cardinal Stadium
- Coordinates: 38.943283°N 77.000780°W
- Owner: Catholic University of America
- Operator: Catholic Cardinals
- Capacity: 3,500
- Surface: Artificial turf
- Current use: Football; Field hockey

Construction
- Opened: 1985
- Renovated: 2006 (new surface); 2007 (new scoreboard); 2016 (new surface)

Tenants
- Catholic University (NCAA D-III) 1985–present DC Current (MLU) 2013–2016; DC Breeze (AUDL) 2018–present Old Glory DC (MLR) 2019–2020

Website
- catholicathletics.com/cardinal-stadium

Cardinal Stadium is a 3,500-seat multi-purpose stadium in Washington, D.C. The stadium is located on the campus of the Catholic University of America, and is home to the Catholic University Cardinals football and field hockey teams. For the pandemic-shortened 2020 season, it was the home of Old Glory DC of Major League Rugby.

Cardinal Stadium opened in 1985 after Brookland Stadium was closed down. Cardinal Stadium is a 15-minute walk from the Brookland–CUA Station on the Washington Metro Red Line.

The stadium has a synthetic FieldTurf surface, installed in 2006 and renewed in 2016, and a Daktronics scoreboard, installed in 2007. Bleachers are located on the eastern side of the stadium, and are separated from the playing field by an eight-lane track.
