= Doug Fraser (rugby union) =

Canadian rugby union player

- Born: 8 May 1992 (age 34) Belleville, Ontario
- Height: 5 ft 9 in (1.75 m)
- Weight: 205 lb (93 kg)
- School: Ladysmith Secondary
- University: University of Victoria

Rugby union career
- Position(s): Centre, Winger
- Current team: Old Glory DC
Amateur team(s)
Years	Team	Apps	(Points)
2016-2018	Castaway Wanderers		
Senior career
Years	Team	Apps	(Points)
2019	Austin Elite	4	(0)
2020–	Old Glory DC	27	(40)
Provincial / State sides
Years	Team	Apps	(Points)
2016-	BC Bears		
International career
Years	Team	Apps	(Points)
2017-	Canada Selects		
2018-	Canada	4	(5)

Doug Fraser (born 8 May 1992) is a Canadian professional rugby union player who currently plays as a wing or centre for Old Glory DC in Major League Rugby (MLR). He also plays for Canada internationally.

He previously played for Austin Elite during the 2019 MLR season.

== Club statistics ==
As of 10 November 2021

Season	Team	Games	Starts	Sub	Tries	Cons	Pens	Drops	Points	Yel	Red
MLR 2019	Austin Elite	4	3	1	0	0	0	0	0	0	0
MLR 2020	Old Glory DC	5	4	1	3	0	0	0	15	0	0
MLR 2021	Old Glory DC	8	8	0	2	0	0	0	10	0	0
MLR 2022	Old Glory DC	14	12	2	3	0	0	0	15	0	0
Total		31	27	3	8	0	0	0	40	0	0
