= USA Falcons XV =

USA Falcons
- Union: USA Rugby
- Nickname: USA Falcons
- Coach: Shawn Pittman
Team kit	Change kit

Official website
- www.usa.rugby/mens-eagles/falconsxv/

The USA Falcons or the USA A national team, formerly known as the USA Selects, is the second national rugby team for the United States, usually used for uncapped matches and domestic club sides. The primary national team is known as the USA Eagles or the United States national rugby union team.

== History ==
The USA A side lost 21–83 to England during their 2001 North America tour. The USA A side lost 8–24 to Scotland in 2002 in Portland, Oregon in front of 1,100 fans. The USA Selects participated in the Americas Rugby Championship, a tournament originally featuring the "A" sides for Argentina, Canada, the United States, and Uruguay. The ARC is an annual tournament (except for Rugby World Cup years) that replaced the North America 4 competition. The USA Selects' best results in the ARC were their second-place finishes in 2013 and 2014. In April and May 2015, the Select side were used for the United States 2015 Rugby World Cup warm-up matches in South America, as part of the Eagles 2015 Rugby World Cup preparations. The Selects went 1-2 on their South American Tour defeating Uruguay and losing to the Argentina Jaguars twice.

== Results ==
The following table shows the results of the USA Selects during annual competitions. In 2016 The Americas Pacific Challenge replaced the ARC as the developmental tournament for the USA Selects.

Competition	Results	Finish	Top Try Scorer	Top Points Scorer
2001 England tour of North America	0–1	—N/a	Jone Naqica / Jovesa Naivalu (1)	Link Wilfley (11)
2002 Scotland tour of North America	0–1	—N/a	Aaron Satchwell (1)	Aaron Satchwell (5)
2009 ARC	0–2	4th	Kevin Swiryn (3)	Kevin Swiryn (15)
2010 ARC	1–2	3rd	Samu Manoa (2)	Nese Malifa (13)
2012 ARC	0–3	4th	Eric Duechle (1)	Zack Pangelinan (6)
2013 ARC	2–1	2nd	D. Barrett / T. Maupin (2)	Joe Cowley (24)
2014 ARC	2–1	2nd	Tim Stanfill (4)	T. Stanfill (20)
2015 USA Selects tour of South America	1–2	—N/a	John Quill (2)	AJ MacGinty (32)
2016 APC	1–2	5th	Martin Iosefo	Ben Cima (33)
2017 APC	2–1	2nd	Hanco Germishuys (4)	JP Eloff (17)
2018 APC	0–3	6th	Ryan Matyas (3)	Dylan Audsley (28)
2021 APC	0–2	5th	Barlow / Breytenbach / Sharpe / Wilson (1)	Patrick Madden (12)
2022 Toyota Challenge	0–2	—N/a	Fa’anana-Schultz / Dyer / Lopeti / Mattina / Mooneyham (1)	Luke Carty (10)

== Overall Record ==
Opponent	Played	Won	Drawn	Lost	Win %	For	Aga	Diff
Argentina XV	1	0	0	1	0.00%	15	55	−40
Argentina Jaguars	7	0	0	7	0.00%	79	291	−212
Brazil	1	0	0	1	0.00%	20	33	–13
Chile A	1	0	0	1	0.00%	14	29	–15
Canada A	6	4	0	2	66.66%	147	116	+31
(South Africa) Cheetahs	1	0	0	1	0.00%	25	53	–28
England	1	0	0	1	0.00%	21	83	–62
Fiji Warriors	1	0	0	1	0.00%	12	62	–50
Ontario Blues	1	0	0	1	0.00%	24	27	−3
(South Africa) Pumas	1	0	0	1	0.00%	15	33	−18
Samoa A	1	0	0	1	0.00%	26	48	−22
Scotland	1	0	0	1	0.00%	8	24	−16
Tonga A	2	1	0	1	50.00%	50	54	–4
Uruguay	4	3	0	1	75.00%	71	42	+29
Uruguay A	3	1	0	2	33.33%	82	116	–34
Total	32	9	0	23	28.13%	609	1,066	−457

Up to date as of 11 December 2024

== Roster ==
USA Selects 27-man roster for the uncapped 2018 Americas Pacific Challenge in October 2018.

Note: Flags indicate national union for the club/province as defined by World Rugby.

Player	Position	Date of birth (age)	Caps	Club/province
Pat O'Toole	Hooker	January 5, 1995 (age 31)	0	(United States) San Diego Legion
Kapeli Pifeleti	Hooker	September 1, 1999 (age 26)	0	(England) Saracens
Alex Maughan	Hooker	October 29, 1994 (age 31)	1	(United States) Life University
John Hayden	Prop	December 28, 1991 (age 34)	0	(United States) Seattle Seawolves
Cam Falcon	Prop	August 18, 1993 (age 32)	0	(United States) New Orleans Gold
Angus MacLellan	Prop	August 24, 1992 (age 33)	5	(United States) Utah Warriors
Kelepi Fifita	Prop	August 23, 1995 (age 30)	0	(United States) Glendale Raptors
Chance Wenglewski	Prop	September 4, 1997 (age 28)	0	(United States) Lindenwood University
Nate Brakeley	Lock	August 31, 1989 (age 36)	15	(United States) Rugby United New York
Matt Jensen	Lock	April 21, 1992 (age 33)	7	(United States) Utah Warriors
Taylor Krumrei	Lock	July 2, 1992 (age 33)	0	(United States) Seattle Seawolves
Hanco Germishuys	Flanker	August 24, 1996 (age 29)	8	(United States) Austin Elite
Vili Toluta’u	Flanker	January 24, 1994 (age 32)	1	(United States) Seattle Seawolves
Psalm Wooching	Flanker	January 16, 1994 (age 32)	3	(United States) Seattle Saracens
Brendan Daly	Number 8	December 20, 1990 (age 35)	2	(United States) SFGG
Robles Thomas	Number 8	October 27, 1994 (age 31)	0	(United States) University of California
Nick Boyer	Scrum-half	July 17, 1993 (age 32)	0	(United States) San Diego Legion
Holden Yungert	Scrum-half	July 17, 1993 (age 32)	0	(United States) New Orleans
Devereaux Ferris	Scrum-half	October 24, 1994 (age 31)	0	(United States) Life West
JP Eloff	Fly-half	May 28, 1991 (age 34)	9	(United States) New Orleans
Conor Kearns	Fly-half	March 12, 1993 (age 32)	0	(United States) San Diego Legion
Dylan Audsley	Centre	January 15, 1994 (age 32)	6	(United States) San Diego Legion
Anthony Salaber	Centre	September 24, 1994 (age 31)	0	(United States) San Diego Legion
Mika Kruse	Centre	June 27, 1998 (age 27)	0	(United States) Glendale Raptors
Zach Young	Centre	February 15, 1996 (age 29)	0	(United States) University of Arkansas
Ryan Matyas	Wing	December 24, 1990 (age 35)	10	(United States) San Diego Legion
Tim Maupin	Wing	March 23, 1989 (age 36)	7	(United States) New Orleans Gold
Mitch Wilson	Fullback	April 15, 1996 (age 29)	0	(United States) Life University
