= World Rugby Americas Pacific Challenge =

Rugby union tournament for the Americas and Pacific island nations

Americas Pacific Challenge
- Most recent season or competition: 2021 World Rugby Americas Pacific Challenge
- Sport: Rugby Union
- First season: 2016
- Countries: Argentina; Brazil; Chile; Paraguay; United States; Uruguay
- Most recent champion: Argentina XV (2021)
- Most titles: Argentina XV (3)

The Americas Pacific Challenge (APC) is a rugby union tournament funded by World Rugby that serves as a development competition for Americas and Pacific island nations. It provides a way to prepare players for participation with their senior national men's teams during international tests and in the Rugby World Cup qualification cycle.

The competition has been hosted by the Uruguayan Rugby Union since 2016, with all games played in Montevideo. Prior to its creation, two teams from the Americas had played in the Pacific Challenge, hosted by Fiji in 2015. This was reversed in 2016 with two Pacific Island teams joining the inaugural APC which effectively replaced the previous format of the Americas Rugby Championship.

== History ==
The APC was first contested in October 2016 by the national 'A' teams of Argentina, Canada, Fiji, Samoa, Uruguay and United States. Tonga took the place of the Fijian team for the 2017 competition, and retained that place in 2018.

The competition had a two-year hiatus which encompassed the 2019 Rugby World Cup and a 2020 season disrupted by impacts of the COVID-19 pandemic. Teams from Brazil, Chile and Paraguay took part for the first time in the 2021 Challenge, but the Pacific Islands did not participate due to difficulties with COVID-19 travel logistics.

== Format ==
The Americas Pacific Challenge uses a split pool format wherein the six competing teams are divided into two pools of three. Each team plays one match against each of the teams in the opposite pool. The tournament's winner is decided based upon the number of points accumulated from each match.

== Participating teams ==
The final placings of all teams for each year are recorded in the table below as numbers (where 1 denotes first place, 2 denotes second, etc.). The host nation's placing is shown in bold. A dash (–) is recorded in the year column if a team did not compete at a tournament.

Year Nation	2016	2017	2018	2021	Years played
North America
Canada A	6	6	5	–	3
USA Selects	5	2	6	5	4
South America
Argentina XV	1	1	2	1	4
Brazil A	–	–	–	3	1
Chile A	–	–	–	2	1
Paraguay A	–	–	–	6	1
Uruguay A	**4**	**5**	**3**	**4**	4
Pacific teams
Fiji Warriors	2	–	–	–	1
Samoa A	3	4	1	–	3
Tonga A	–	3	4	–	2
Number of teams All-time total: 10	6	6	6	6	4 Editions

== Winners ==
Year	# of Teams	Winner	Runner-up	Venue
**2016**	6	**Argentina XV**	Fiji Warriors	Estadio Charrúa, Montevideo
**2017**	6	**Argentina XV**	USA Selects	Estadio Charrúa, Montevideo
**2018**	6	**Samoa A**	Argentina XV	Estadio Charrúa, Montevideo
**2021**	6	**Argentina XV**	Chile A	Estadio Charrúa, Montevideo

== See also ==
- End-of-year rugby union internationals
- Americas Rugby Championship
- World Rugby Pacific Challenge
