= United States national under-23 rugby union team =

United States U-23
- Union: USA Rugby
- Nickname(s): Men's Collegiate All-Americans
- Coach(es): Agustin Cavalieri
Team kit	Change kit

Official website
- usa.rugby/pathways

The United States national under-23 rugby union team, known as the Men's Collegiate All-Americans, represents the United States in rugby union at U23 level. It is primarily represented by American players between the ages of 19-23 who participate in a club or collegiate rugby program.

== Recent results ==
The following table shows the results in official matches played by the Men's Collegiate All-Americans (score always listed first). The list may be incomplete.

Opposition	For	Against	Date	Location	Competition	Ref
Darling Downs Select XV	31	17	2016-08-06	Toowoomba, Australia	Tour Match	
Brothers RFC	34	36	2016-08-10	Brisbane, Australia	Tour Match	
QPR Barbarians XV	40	43	2016-08-13	Brisbane, Australia	Tour Match	
Brussels Devils	22	20	2022-07-09	Amsterdam, Netherlands	Corendon Summer Tour	
Delta	16	22	2022-07-16	Amsterdam, Netherlands	Corendon Summer Tour	
UXI Western Province Invitational XV	41	12	2025-07-02	Western Province Rugby Academy	Tour Match	
Boland Cavaliers U23	57	26	2025-07-08	Boland Stadium	Tour Match	
Maties Rugby	85	15	2025-07-12	Danie Craven Stadium	Tour Match	

== Roster ==
The following is the Roster for the 2025 South Africa Tour.

Name	Rugby Club
Adam Chadwick	Life University
Aidan King	NOLA Gold
Alejandro Tapia Martinez	Anthem Rugby Carolina
Alexander Hernandez	Chicago Hounds
Bastian Brunello	Mount Saint Mary's
Byron Finley	Cal Berkeley
Campbell Robb	Central Washington
Coby Baker	Cal Poly
Connor Devos	Lindenwood
Corbin Smith	Anthem Rugby Carolina
Damian Morley	Miami Sharks
Darius Law	San Diego Legion
Elias Garza	Life University
Graeme Pedegana	Anthem Rugby Carolina
Hayden McKay	Mount Saint Mary's
Hugh O'Kennedy	Trinity College
Iosefa “JT” Toia'ivao	Saint Mary's College
James Rose	Life University
John Wilson	Saint Mary's College
Keelan Farrell	Durham University
Logan Ballinger	Life University
Oliver Kirk	Cal Berkeley
Rand Santos	Cal Berkeley
Rhys Mitchell	Anthem Rugby Carolina
Shaun Matthysen	Life University
Solomon Williams	Cal Berkeley
Sosaia Pongi	Saint Mary's College
Spencer Huntley	San Diego Mustangs
Tiai Vavao Central	Washington
Tomiwa Agbongbon	Cornish Pirates
William Sherman	UCLA

=== Management ===
- Agustin Cavalieri - Head Coach
- Elvis Seveali'i - Assistant Coach
- Brendan Keane - Assistant Coach
- Darran Coleman - Manager
- Natalie Frizell - Athletic Trainer
- Declan Oorloff – Performance Analyst
- Karan Shukla – Physician
- Peyton Fennell – Physician

== See also ==
- United States national under-20 rugby union team (Junior All Americans)
