= Ryan Louwrens =

South African rugby union player

- Born: Ryan Louwrens; 12 March 1991 (age 35) Johannesburg, Transvaal, South Africa
- Height: 1.79 m (5 ft 10 in)
- Weight: 93 kg (14 st 9 lb)
- School: Churchlands High, Perth

Rugby union career
- Position: Scrum-half
Senior career
Years	Team	Apps	(Points)
2015–2016	Perth Spirit	14	(51)
2018–2021	Kintetsu Liners	18	(55)
2022	Austin Gilgronis	14	(15)
2024	Montpellier	6	(0)
- Correct as of 16 December 2024
Super Rugby
Years	Team	Apps	(Points)
2014–2017	Western Force	24	(15)
2020	Melbourne Rebels	9	(5)
2023–2024	Melbourne Rebels	28	(37)
- Correct as of 8 June 2024

Ryan Louwrens (born 12 March 1991) is a South African Australian professional rugby union player currently playing as a scrum-half for Montpellier.

Formerly with the Western Force (Super Rugby), based in the city he migrated to as a teenager, Louwrens has also played with the Perth Spirit, the Kintetsu Liners of the Japanese Top League, the Austin Gilgronis in Major League Rugby (MLR), and the Melbourne Rebels in Super Rugby.

== Early life ==
Louwrens was born in Johannesburg, South Africa, where he attended Kempton Park High School in Johannesburg. When he was 16 years old, he moved with his parents to Australia, where he attended Churchlands Senior High School in Perth. He was invited to join the RugbyWA Academy in 2008. In 2009, he returned to South Africa, where he played at the Craven Week tournament and represented Valke at the Under 19 Currie Cup. Near the end of that season, he failed a drug test and was banned for two years by the South African Rugby Union's disciplinary tribunal for using anabolic steroids.

== Career ==
In Perth, Louwrens was given a second chance and he began playing rugby for the Cottesloe club before rejoining the RugbyWA Academy in 2011. He went on to play for the Force ‘A’ team in 2012 and 2013, and played for the Western Force in their 2013 pre-season trial against Tonga XV. Louwrens was also a member of Cottesloe's grand final team in 2013. He signed an Extended Playing Squad contract with the Western Force for the 2014 season.

Louwrens played for the Force in their 2014 pre-season trial matches against a Samoa XV and the Pampas XV. He also started in all three matches for Force A in the 2014 Pacific Rugby Cup, scoring a try against Junior Japan. Soon after, he incurred a knee injury in training, which required an anterior cruciate ligament reconstruction that ended his season.

In May 2015, he made his Super Rugby debut for the Force off the bench against the Chiefs at Hamilton. He scored two tries in the team's upset home win over the NSW Waratahs two weeks later at nib Stadium.

Louwrens has signed for the Melbourne Rebels for the 2020 Super Rugby season.

== Super Rugby statistics ==
As of 3 June 2023

Season	Team	Games	Starts	Sub	Mins	Tries	Cons	Pens	Drops	Points	Yel	Red
2014	Force	0	0	0	0	0	0	0	0	0	0	0
2015	Force	7	4	3	318	2	0	0	0	10	0	0
2016	Force	12	1	11	273	1	0	0	0	5	0	0
2017	Force	5	5	0	259	0	0	0	0	0	0	0
2020	Rebels	5	4	1	330	0	0	0	0	0	0	0
2020 AU	Rebels	4	4	0	259	1	0	0	0	5	0	0
2023	Rebels	14	14	0	899	4	0	0	0	20	0	0
Total		47	32	15	2,338	8	0	0	0	40	0	0
