= 2012 Americas Rugby Championship =

2012 ARC Season
- League: Americas Rugby Championship
- Sport: Rugby Union
- Duration: 12–20 October 2012
- Teams: 4

Americas Rugby Championship
- Champions: Argentina Jaguars

ARC seasons
- 2010 2013

The 2012 Americas Rugby Championship season was the third season of the Americas Rugby Championship. It took place between 12 and 20 October 2012 in Langford, British Columbia. The tournament featured the same teams as in the 2010 version, Argentina Jaguars, Canada Selects, USA Selects, with the exception of Uruguay who replaced Tonga A. The Argentina Jaguars won the tournament going undefeated in three matches.

== Teams ==
- Argentina Jaguars
- Canada A
- (United States) USA Selects
- Uruguay

== Table ==
Place	Nation	Games				Points			Bonus points		Table points
Place	Nation	Played	Won	Drawn	Lost	For	Against	Diff	4 Tries	7 Point Loss	Table points
1	Argentina Jaguars	3	3	0	0	88	22	+66	1	0	13
2	Canada A	3	2	0	1	60	41	+19	0	0	8
3	Uruguay	3	1	0	2	46	57	-11	0	0	4
4	(United States) USA Selects	3	0	0	3	14	88	-74	0	0	0

== Schedule ==
All times are in PDT (UTC−7).

12 October 2012

USA Selects (United States)	3–39	Argentina Jaguars
Pen: McDonald (0/3); Pangelinan (1/1)	Report	Try: Rojas; Iglesias; Cruz; Ramiro (2); Con: Iglesias (4/5); Pen: Iglesias(2/2)

Canadian Rugby Centre of Excellence, Langford, British Columbia
Attendance: 1,745
Referee: Joaquin Montes (Uruguay)

12 October 2012

Canada A	28–10	Uruguay
Try: Ardron; Parfrey; Underhill; Con: Braid (2/3); Pen: Braid (3/3)	Report	Try: Ormaechea; Con: Berchesi (1/1); Pen: Berchesi (1/2)

Canadian Rugby Centre of Excellence, Langford, British Columbia
Attendance: 1,745
Referee: Juan Sylvestre (Argentina)

16 October 2012
17:30

Uruguay	10–21	Argentina Jaguars
Try: Duran; Con: Etcheverry (1/1); Pen: Etcheverry (1/1)	Report	Try: Masera; Barrea; Con: Cruz (1/2); Pen: Cruz (3/3)

Canadian Rugby Centre of Excellence, Langford, British Columbia
Referee: Bryan Arciero (Canada)

16 October 2012
19:30

Canada A	23–3	(United States) USA Selects
Try: Penalty try Wilson-Ross; Meeres; Con: Braid (1/3); Pen: Braid (2/3)	Report	Pen: Pangelinan (1/3)

Canadian Rugby Centre of Excellence, Langford, British Columbia
Referee: Juan Sylvestre (Argentina)

20 October 2012
17:30

(United States) USA Selects	8–26	Uruguay
Try: Duechle; Con: McDonald (0/1); Pen: McDonald (1/2)	Report	Try: Penalty try Magno; Con: Etcheverry (2/2); Pen: Etcheverry (3/3); Favaro (1/1)

Canadian Rugby Centre of Excellence, Langford, British Columbia
Attendance: 3,255
Referee: Bryan Arciero (Canada)

20 October 2012
19:30

Canada A	9–28	Argentina Jaguars
Pen: Braid (3/4)	Report	Try: Moyano (2); Orlando; Con: Iglesias (2/3); Pen: Iglesias (3/3)

Canadian Rugby Centre of Excellence, Langford, British Columbia
Attendance: 3,255
Referee: Joaquin Montes (Uruguay)
