= 2015 World Rugby Pacific Challenge =

Rugby union tournament

- Countries: Argentina (1 team); Canada (1 team); Fiji (1 team); Japan (1 team); Samoa (1 team); Tonga (1 team)
- Date: 10–23 March 2015
- Champions: Pampas XV (2nd title)
- Runners-up: Fiji Warriors

The 2015 Pacific Challenge was the tenth World Rugby Pacific Challenge (known as the IRB Pacific Rugby Cup in previous seasons). The tournament, featuring six national 'A' rugby union teams, was hosted in Fiji. The tournament was won by Pampas XV, who defeated Fiji Warriors by 17–9 in the final.

== Format ==
The teams were split into two pools and each team played the three opponents in the opposite pool. The teams finishing on top of each pool progressed to the final, the second teams in each pool played off for third place, and the bottom teams in each pool played off for fifth place.

== Teams ==
The six competing teams were:

Pool A

- Junior Japan
- (Argentina) Pampas XV
- Samoa A

Pool B

- Canada A
- Fiji Warriors
- Tonga A

== Standings ==
Competition tables after the pool matches:

=== Pool A ===
Team	Played	Won	Drawn	Lost	For	Against	Diff	BP1	BP2	Pts
Pampas XV	3	3	0	0	89	42	+47	2	0	14
Samoa A	3	2	0	1	69	87	-18	1	0	9
Junior Japan	3	0	0	3	41	212	-171	1	0	1
Updated: 18 March 2015; Source: worldrugby.org

Competition rules
Points breakdown:
4 points for a win
2 points for a draw
1 bonus point for a loss by seven points or less
1 bonus point for scoring four or more tries in a match
Classification:
Teams standings are calculated as follows:
Most log points accumulated from all matches
Most log points accumulated in matches between tied teams
Highest difference between points scored for and against accumulated from all matches
Most points scored accumulated from all matches

=== Pool B ===
Team	Played	Won	Drawn	Lost	For	Against	Diff	BP1	BP2	Pts
Fiji Warriors	3	2	0	1	145	42	+103	2	1	11
Canada A	3	1	0	2	101	72	+29	1	1	6
Tonga A	3	1	0	2	95	85	+10	1	1	6
Updated: 18 March 2015; Source: worldrugby.org

== Pool matches ==
=== Round 1 ===
10 March 2015	Junior Japan	17–69	Canada A	ANZ Stadium, Suva
13:00		Summary

10 March 2015	Samoa A	30–28	Tonga A	ANZ Stadium, Suva
15:00		Summary

10 March 2015	Pampas XV	22–20	Fiji Warriors	ANZ Stadium, Suva
17:00		Summary

=== Round 2 ===
14 March 2015	Pampas XV	31–7	Tonga A	ANZ Stadium, Suva
11:00		Summary

14 March 2015	Samoa A	19–17	Canada A	ANZ Stadium, Suva
13:00		Summary

14 March 2015	Junior Japan	0–83	Fiji Warriors	ANZ Stadium, Suva
15:00		Summary

=== Round 3 ===
18 March 2015	Junior Japan	24–60	Tonga A	ANZ Stadium, Suva
13:00		Summary

18 March 2015	Pampas XV	36–15	Canada A	ANZ Stadium, Suva
15:00		Summary

18 March 2015	Samoa A	20–42	Fiji Warriors	ANZ Stadium, Suva
17:00		Summary

== Finals ==
=== 5th place ===
23 March 2015	Junior Japan	24–43	Tonga A	ANZ Stadium, Suva
13:00		Summary; Report		Referee: Kaveni Talemaivalagi (Fiji)

=== 3rd place ===
23 March 2015	Samoa A	26–28	Canada A	ANZ Stadium, Suva
15:00		Summary; Report		Referee: Petelo Kelekolio (Samoa)

=== Final ===
23 March 2015	Pampas XV	17–9	Fiji Warriors	ANZ Stadium, Suva
17:00	Try: Cordero; De la Fuente; Con: González Iglesias (2); Pen: González Iglesias	Summary; Report	Pen: Vularika (3)	Referee: Brendon Pickerill (New Zealand)
