= 2013 Americas Rugby Championship =

2013 ARC Season
- League: Americas Rugby Championship
- Sport: Rugby Union
- Duration: 11–19 October 2013
- Teams: 4

Americas Rugby Championship
- Champions: Argentina Jaguars

ARC seasons
- ← 2012 2014 →

The 2013 Americas Rugby Championship season was the fourth season of the Americas Rugby Championship. It took place between 11 and 19 October 2013 in Langford, British Columbia. The tournament featured the same teams as in the 2012 version, Argentina Jaguars, Canada Selects, USA Selects, and Uruguay. Uruguay qualified by placing second, behind Argentina, at the 2013 edition of the South American Rugby Championship.

== Teams ==
- Argentina Jaguars
- Canada A
- (United States) USA Selects
- Uruguay

== Standings ==
Place	Nation	Games				Points			Bonus points		Table points
Place	Nation	Played	Won	Drawn	Lost	For	Against	Diff	4 Tries	7 Point Loss	Table points
1	Argentina Jaguars	3	3	0	0	84	23	+61	2	0	14
2	(United States) USA Selects	3	2	0	1	59	45	+14	0	0	8
3	Canada A	3	1	0	2	41	63	-22	0	0	4
4	Uruguay	3	0	0	3	18	71	-53	0	1	1

== Schedule ==
All times are in PDT (UTC−7).

11 October 2013
18:00

USA Selects (United States)	9–27	Argentina Jaguars
Pen: Siddall (3)	Report	Try: Chiappesoni; Orlando; Rojas; Barrea; Con: Poet (2); Pen: Poet (1)

Canadian Rugby Centre of Excellence, Langford, British Columbia

11 October 2013
20:00

Canada A	17–10	Uruguay
Try: Fitzpatrick; Scholz; Con: McQueen (2/2); Pen: McQueen (1)	Report	Try: Bueno; Con: Prada (1/1); Pen: Prada (1)

Canadian Rugby Centre of Excellence, Langford, British Columbia

15 October 2013
18:00

Uruguay	0–34	Argentina Jaguars
	Report	Try: Fernández; Moyano 2 Cappiello; Con: Fernández (4/4); Pen: Fernández (2/2)

Canadian Rugby Centre of Excellence, Langford, British Columbia

15 October 2013
20:00

Canada A	10–30	(United States) USA Selects
Try: Trainor; Con: du Toit (1/1); Pen: du Toit (1/1)	Report	Try: Maupin 2 Barrett; Con: Cowley (3/3); Pen: Cowley (3/3)

Canadian Rugby Centre of Excellence, Langford, British Columbia

19 October 2013
15:00

Uruguay	8-20	(United States) USA Selects
Try: Astigarraga; Pen: Prada (1/1)	Report	Try: Danny Barrett, Christopher Chapman; Con: Joe Cowley (2/2); Pen: Joe Cowley (2/2)

Canadian Rugby Centre of Excellence, Langford, British Columbia

19 October 2013
17:00

Canada A	14-23	Argentina Jaguars
Try: Mike Scholz, Conor Trainor; Con: Jack Fitzpatrick (2/2)	Report	Try: Javier Rojas; Con: Sebastian Poet; Pen: Patricio Fernandez (2/2), Sebastian Poet

Canadian Rugby Centre of Excellence, Langford, British Columbia
