= Paki Afu =

Tonga international rugby league & union footballer

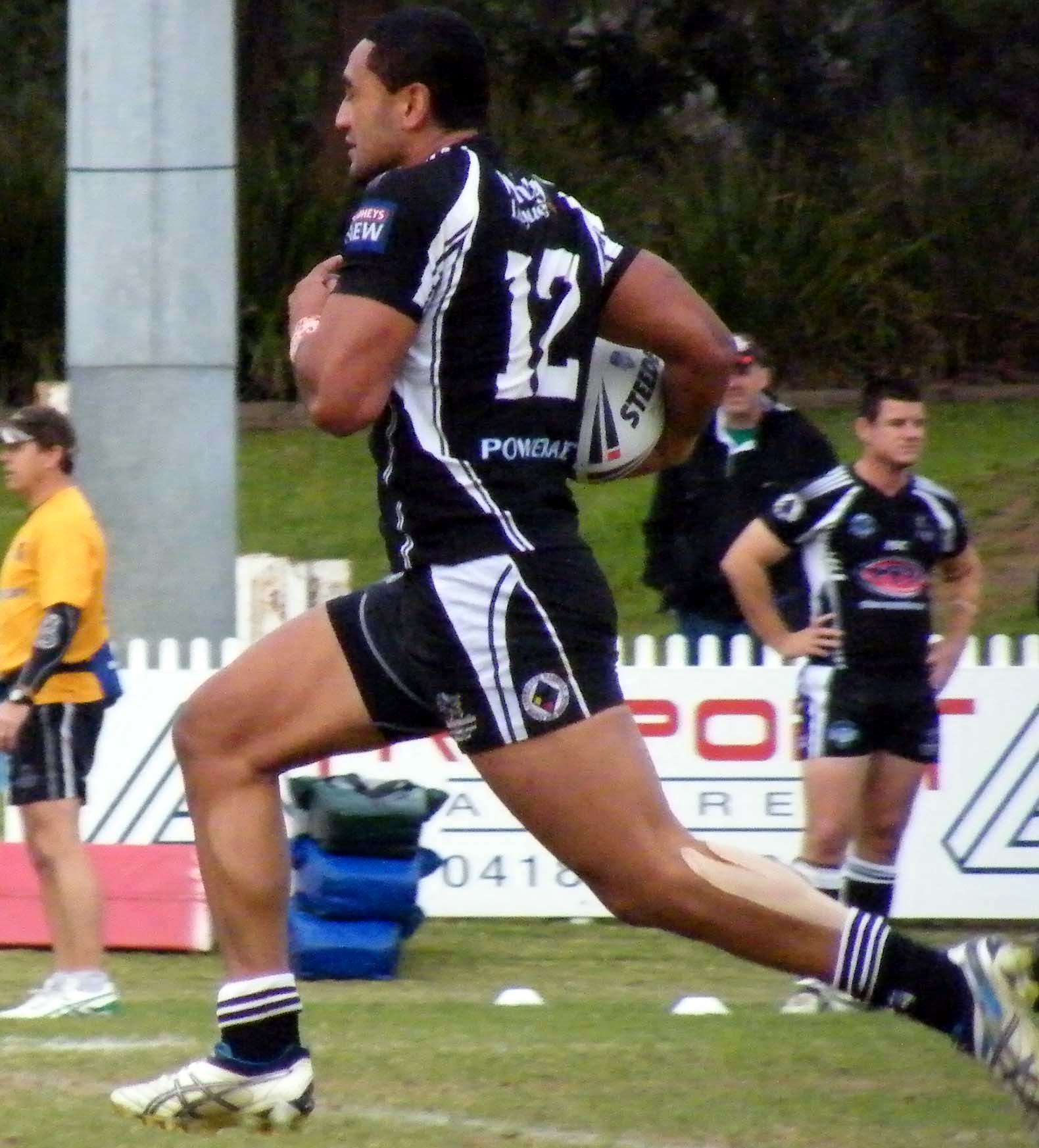

Personal information
- Full name: Pakisonasi Afu
- Born: 7 September 1990 (age 36) Auckland, New Zealand
- Height: 190 cm (6 ft 3 in)
- Weight: 114 kg (17 st 13 lb)

Playing information

Rugby league
- Position: Prop, Second-row, Lock
Club
Years	Team	Pld	T	G	FG	P
2016	Sydney Roosters	0	0	0	0	0
Representative
Years	Team	Pld	T	G	FG	P
2009	Tonga	2	0	0	0	0

Rugby union
- Position: Centre
Club
Years	Team	Pld	T	G	FG	P
2017–2018	Austin Elite Rugby	0	0	0	0	0
2019–	Utah Warriors Selects
	Total	0	0	0	0	0
Representative
Years	Team	Pld	T	G	FG	P
2016–	Tonga A	6	4	0	0	20

Pakisonasi Afu (born 7 September 1990) is a professional rugby footballer who has represented Tonga in rugby league and Tonga A in rugby union. He is contracted to Austin Elite Rugby to play Major League Rugby in the United States. Afu previously played rugby league in the NSW Cup for New Zealand Warriors and Wyong Roos as a prop. His usual position in rugby union is centre.

== Early life ==
Pakisonasi Afu was born in Auckland, New Zealand. He played rugby league as an Otahuhu Leopards junior before moving to Australia in 2008.

== Playing career ==
=== Rugby league ===
Afu played for the Canterbury Bulldogs in the Toyota Cup between 2008 and 2010. He was a Tongan international in 2009, and in 2010 he was named in the Junior Kiwis squad.

He signed with the Parramatta Eels for 2011 and played for the Wentworthville Magpies in the Bundaberg Red Cup. Following this, Afu went on a Mormon mission to the Philippines.

In 2014, he returned to New Zealand and the Otahuhu Leopards, playing in the Auckland Rugby League competition. In 2015, after moving to the Point Chevalier Pirates, he was selected for Auckland and also played for the New Zealand Warriors in the NSW Cup. Later that year he was signed by the Sydney Roosters.

He played for the Wyong Roos, the Roosters' reserve side, in the NSW Cup in 2016.

=== Rugby union ===
Afu switched codes to rugby union in 2017, representing Tonga A in the Pacific Challenge tournament where he scored two tries against Junior Japan, and in the Americas Pacific Challenge, scoring two tries against Canada A.

He signed with Austin Elite Rugby to play in the 2018 inaugural season of Major League Rugby in the United States.
