= 2020 World Rugby Pacific Challenge =

Rugby union tournament

- Date: 6–14 March 2020
- Champions: Junior Japan
- Runners-up: Fiji Warriors
- Matches played: 6

The 2020 Pacific Challenge was the fifteenth World Rugby Pacific Challenge. Teams from Japan, Fiji, Samoa and Tonga featured in the competition which was played in Fiji as a round-robin tournament. Junior Japan went undefeated in winning the challenge title, with the Fiji Warriors finishing as runner-up. The Japanese defeated the Fijian team by 21–12 in the last round.

== Teams ==
The four teams that competed were:

- Junior Japan
- Samoa A
- Fiji Warriors
- Tonga A

== Table ==
2020 World Rugby Pacific Challenge
Team	P	W	D	L	PF	PA	PD	TB	LB	Pts
Junior Japan	3	3	0	0	143	25	+118	2	0	14
Fiji Warriors	3	2	0	1	88	26	+62	2	0	10
Tonga A	3	1	0	2	46	103	−57	1	0	5
Samoa A	3	0	0	3	18	141	−123	0	0	0
Updated: 15 March 2020; Source: itsrugby.co.uk (archived)

== Match results ==
=== Round 1 ===
6 March 2020	Junior Japan	46–10	Tonga A	ANZ Stadium, Suva
3:30pm		Summary

6 March 2020	Fiji Warriors	29–5	Samoa A	ANZ Stadium, Suva
5:30pm		Summary

=== Round 2 ===
10 March 2020	Samoa A	3–76	Junior Japan	ANZ Stadium, Suva
3:30pm		Summary

10 March 2020	Fiji Warriors	47–0	Tonga A	ANZ Stadium, Suva
5:30pm		Summary

=== Round 3 ===
14 March 2020	Tonga A	36–10	Samoa A	ANZ Stadium, Suva
12:30pm		Summary

14 March 2020	Fiji Warriors	12–21	Junior Japan	ANZ Stadium, Suva
3:30pm		Summary

Junior Japan
Pacific Challenge Champion
First title
