= Fiji Warriors =

Fijian representative rugby union team

- Union: Fiji Rugby Union
- Nickname(s): Warriors, Fiji A
- Emblem: the Palm
- Coach: Senirusi Seruvakula
Team kit

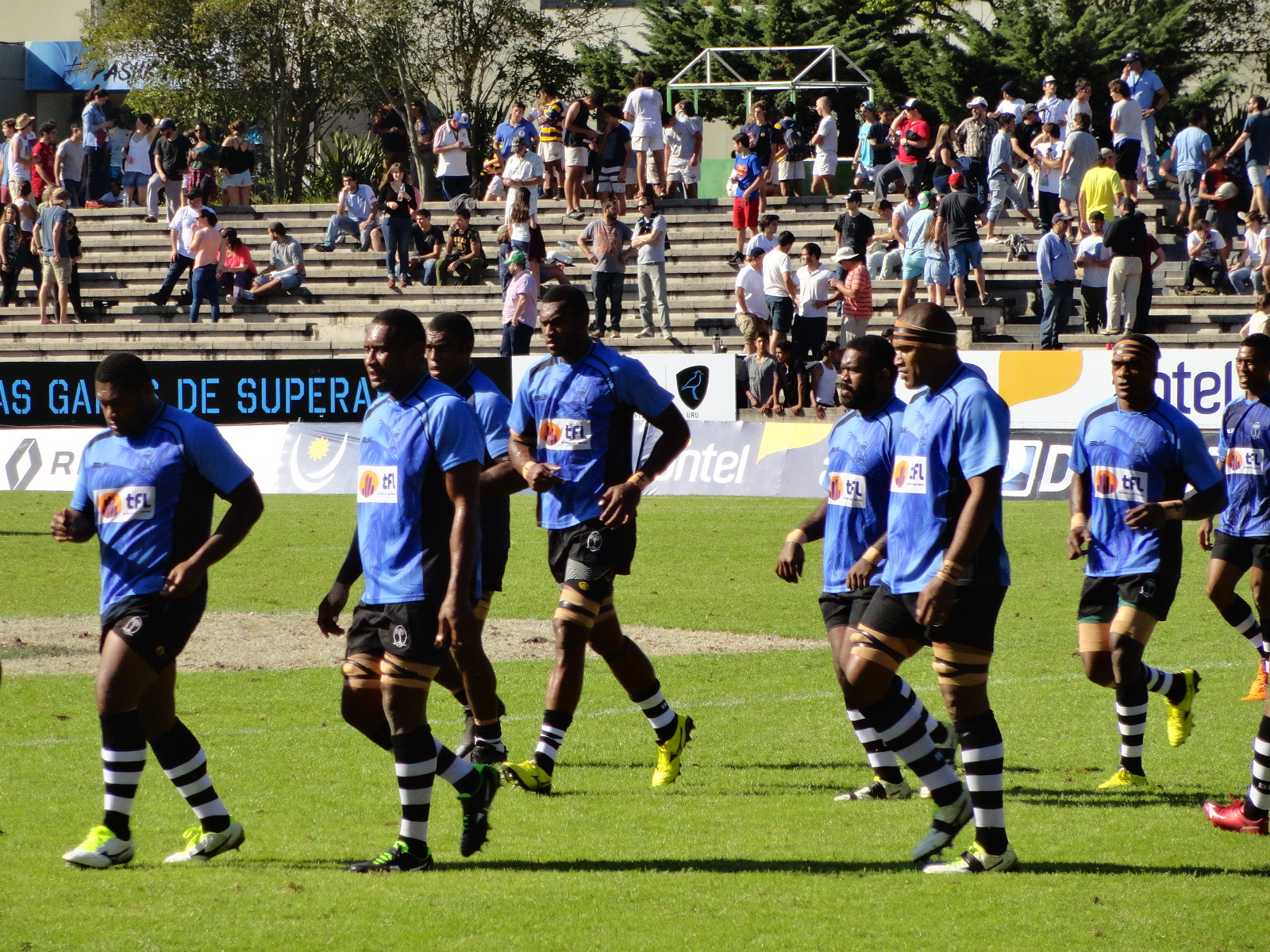
Fiji Warriors team at the 2016 Americas Pacific Challenge in Uruguay.

The Fiji Latui, also referred to as Fiji A, is a national representative rugby union team of Fiji. It is the second-tier side to the Fiji national team. As the Fiji Warriors, the team competed in the World Rugby Pacific Challenge against Samoa A and Tonga A. From 2016, the Warriors played in the Americas Pacific Challenge against national A teams from North and South America.

== History ==
Fiji's national A team has made several tours to South America, the earliest being in 2003 where they defeated Uruguay by 24–3 in Montevideo. The history of the second national team can be traced back almost half a century earlier to 1955 when a Fiji XV side undertook a two-week tour of Samoa and was undefeated in all three matches played.

The Fiji Warriors first played in the Pacific Rugby Cup in 2006, but the team was one of two Fijian sides in the competition for the first five years – the other being the Fiji Barbarians – and so it was not considered to be Fiji A for that period.

In 2010, Fiji A played two matches against Tonga A in the first Punjas Series. The team had one win and one loss but claimed the series on aggregate scores. This result was repeated in the second (and concluding) Punjas Series in 2011.

The Pacific Rugby Cup was reorganised in 2011, with Fiji Warriors becoming the sole Fijian representative in the PRC, which has since been mainly contested by national A teams. From 2011 onward the Fiji Warriors team was effectively Fiji A.

In 2012, the Fiji A team toured to Ireland where they suffered one of their heaviest defeats, beaten 53–0 at Thomond Park, Limerick by Ireland A.

At the 2015 World Rugby Pacific Challenge, the Fiji Warriors were the runner-up, with wins over Junior Japan and Samoa A and two defeats against the Argentine Pampas XV. In May 2015, the Fiji Warriors made a South American tour to play Uruguay and an Argentina XV, winning all three matches. In 2016, it played World Rugby Pacific Challenge and also World Rugby Americas Pacific Challenge.

In 2026, the Fiji Rugby Union announced that the Fiji Latui would replace the Warriors as the national second team. The team's inaugural fixture was against an Ireland XV at Musgrave Park, Cork, with the hosts winning 61–12.

== Squads ==
=== 2011 ===
2011 Fiji Warriors squad – PRC
- Waisea Daveta*
- Viliame Veikoso*
- Setefano Somoca*
- Sekonaia Kalou*
- Tevita Cavubati**
- Aca Ratuva**
- Jimilai Naikadawa**
- Anare Koliavu
- Nemia Kenatale*
- Taniela Rawaqa**
- Isoa Neivua**
- Ravai Fatiaki*
- Jo Naisilisili**
- Campese Ma'afu*
- Navi Bolatagici
- Penijamini Makutu**
- Apisalome Ratuniyarawa
- Rupeni Nasiga*
- Timoci Vakadranu
- Samu Bola**
- Waisale Vatuvoka
- Jonetani Ralulu**
- Jona Tuitoga
- Paula Tiko
- Adriu Delai**
- Paula Karatu.

Notes

* denotes players who were in the Fiji 2011 RWC squad.
** denotes players who have played for Fiji in a Test.
*** denotes players who have played 7s for Fiji in the IRB Series.

=== 2015 ===
Fiji Warriors 28-man squad for the uncapped June matches against Uruguay and Pampas XV, acting as 2015 Rugby World Cup warm-ups for all three nations. The team will be coached by Senirusi Seruvakula, who will work closely with the national head coach John McKee.

Warriors Head Coach: (Fiji) Senirusi Seruvakula

- Caps Updated: 15 May 2015

Note: Flags indicate national union for the club/province as defined by World Rugby.

Player	Position	Date of birth (age)	Caps	Club/province
Sireli Ledua (c)	Hooker	12 December 1985 (age 40)	6	(Fiji) Northland
Jale Sassen	Hooker	6 September 1992 (age 34)	0	(Fiji) Tailevu
Seru Cakobau	Hooker	22 May 1988 (age 38)	0	(Fiji) Nadroga
Leeroy Atalifo	Prop	10 March 1988 (age 38)	1	(Fiji) Suva
Taniela Koroi	Prop	8 February 1990 (age 36)	1	(New Zealand) Wellington
Peni Ravai	Prop	16 June 1990 (age 36)	2	(Fiji) Nadroga
Kirwan Sanday	Prop	13 February 1991 (age 35)	0	(Australia) Easts Tigers
Joeli Veitayaki Jr.	Prop		0	(Fiji) Naitasiri
Apisai Naikatini	Lock	4 April 1985 (age 41)	18	(New Zealand) Wellington
Savenaca Tabakanalagi	Lock	31 August 1986 (age 40)	0	(Fiji) Suva
Mataiasi Ucutabua	Lock		0	(Fiji) Vatukoula
Meli Baivatu	Flanker	2 April 1993 (age 33)	0	(Fiji) Vatukoula
Jone Dyer	Flanker		0	(Fiji) Vatukoula
Malakai Namalo	Flanker		0	(Fiji) Vatukoula
Timoci Sauvoli	Flanker		0	(Fiji) Nadroga
Jolame Bera	Number 8	1 February 1984 (age 42)	0	(Fiji) Suva
Serupepeli Vularika	Scrum-half		0	(Fiji) Suva
Emori Waqa	Scrum-half	24 April 1993 (age 33)	0	(Fiji) Tailevu
Isoa Donaldson	Fly-half	13 September 1986 (age 40)	0	(Fiji) Nadroga
Kini Douglas	Fly-half	5 January 1994 (age 32)	0	(Fiji) Naitasiri
Saimoni Tuilaucala	Centre		0	(Fiji) Tavua
John Stewart	Centre		0	(Fiji) Suva
Eroni Vasiteri	Centre	27 May 1989 (age 37)	0	(Fiji) Nadroga
Nacani Wakaya	Wing		0	(Fiji) Suva
Josaia Qumi	Wing		0	(Fiji) Vatukoula
Sam Speight	Wing	3 October 1985 (age 41)	0	(Fiji) Lautoka
Kitione Ratu	Fullback		0	(Fiji) Vatukoula
Tikilaci Vuibau	Fullback	14 August 1992 (age 34)	0	(Fiji) Northland

== Record ==
=== Honours ===
Pacific Challenge (formerly the Pacific Rugby Cup)

- Champion: (9) 2009, 2010, 2011, 2012, 2013, 2016, 2017, 2018, 2019
- Runner-up: (4) 2006, 2014, 2015, 2020

Americas Pacific Challenge

- Runner-up: (1) 2016

=== Season standings ===
Pacific Challenge

Year	Pos	Pld	W	D	L	F	A	+/-	TB	LB	Pts	Final	Notes
2020	2nd	3	2	0	1	88	26	+62	2	0	10	—	Runner-up on league table (no final)
2019	1st	3	3	0	0	170	54	+116	3	0	15	—	Title winner on league table (no final)
2018	1st	3	3	0	0	118	31	+87	3	0	15	—	Title winner on league table (no final)
2017	1st	3	3	0	0	125	71	+54	2	0	15	—	Title winner on league table (no final)
2016	1st	3	3	0	0	134	34	+100	3	0	15	36–0	Won final against Samoa A
2015	2nd	3	2	0	1	145	42	+103	2	1	11	9–17	Lost final to Argentina's Pampas XV
2014	3rd	3	2	0	1	154	59	95	2	1	11	—	Won 3rd play-off 54–21 against Tonga A
2013	1st	6	2	2	2	118	155	-37	2	0	14	—	Title winner on league table (no final)
2012	1st	8	7	0	1	205	165	40	3	0	31	—	Title winner on league table (no final)
2011	1st	8	4	0	4	144	201	-57	0	1	17	—	Title winner on league table (no final)
2010	1st	5	4	0	1	155	73	+82	2	1	19	26–17	Won final against Fiji Barbarians
2009	2nd	5	3	0	2	168	89	+79	3	2	17	19–7	Won final against Upolu Samoa
2008	6th	5	1	0	4	70	104	−34	0	3	7	—	Did not compete in finals
2007	4th	5	2	0	3	93	90	+3	0	1	11	—	Did not compete in finals
2006	2nd	5	3	1	1	112	72	+40	1	1	17	5–10	Lost final to Savaii Samoa

Americas Pacific Challenge

Year	Pos	Pld	W	D	L	F	A	+/-	TB	LB	Pts	Final	Notes
2016	2nd	3	2	0	1	127	65	+62	4	0	12	—	Runner-up on league table (no final)

== International results ==
Matches against national teams or national A teams since 2010:

Date	Competition	Team	Result	Team	Venue
16-04-2010	(PS)	Fiji A	12–27	Tonga A	National Stadium, Suva
23-04-2010	(PS)	Fiji A	21–3	Tonga A	Churchill Park, Lautoka
19-03-2011	(PRC)	Fiji Warriors	21–14	Tonga A	Churchill Park, Lautoka
22-03-2011	(PRC)	Samoa A	12–23	Fiji Warriors	Churchill Park, Lautoka
13-08-2011	(PS)	Fiji A	27–12	Tonga A	Churchill Park, Lautoka
19-08-2011	(PS)	Fiji A	30–32	Tonga A	Churchill Park, Lautoka
15-10-2012	(PRC)	Fiji Warriors	42–34	Samoa A	Teufaiva Sport Stadium, Nuku'alofa
19-10-2012	(PRC)	Tonga A	16–25	Fiji Warriors	Teufaiva Sport Stadium, Nuku'alofa
17-11-2012		Ireland Wolfhounds	53–0	Fiji Warriors	Thomond Park, Limerick
18-03-2014	(PRC)	Junior Japan	13–99	Fiji Warriors	Bond University, Gold Coast
23-03-2014	(PRC)	Fiji Warriors	54–21	Tonga A	TG Millner Field, Sydney
10-03-2015	(PRC)	Fiji Warriors	20–22	Pampas XV	National Stadium, Suva
14-03-2015	(PRC)	Fiji Warriors	83–0	Junior Japan	National Stadium, Suva
18-03-2015	(PRC)	Fiji Warriors	42–20	Samoa A	National Stadium, Suva
23-03-2015	(PRC)	Fiji Warriors	9–17	Pampas XV	National Stadium, Suva
23-05-2015		Uruguay	22–30	Fiji Warriors	Estadio Charrúa, Montevideo
27-05-2015		Argentina XV	21–23	Fiji Warriors	Estadio Suppici, Colonia del Sacramento
20-11-2026		Ireland XV	61–12	Fiji Latui	Musgrave Park, Cork

== See also ==
- Fijian Drua
- Fiji national rugby union team
