= 2014 Americas Rugby Championship =

2014 ARC Season
- League: Americas Rugby Championship
- Sport: Rugby Union
- Duration: 11–19 October 2014
- Number of teams: 4

Americas Rugby Championship
- Champions: Argentina Jaguars

ARC seasons
- ← 2013 2016 →

The 2014 Americas Rugby Championship season was the fifth season of the Americas Rugby Championship. It took place between 11 and 19 October 2014 in Langford, British Columbia. The tournament featured the same teams as in the 2013 version: Argentina Jaguars, Canada Selects, USA Selects, and Uruguay. The Argentina Jaguars won the tournament for a fifth straight time, once again going undefeated in three matches.

== Teams ==
- Argentina Jaguars
- Canada A
- (United States) USA Selects
- Uruguay

== Standings ==
Place	Nation	Games				Points			Bonus points		Table points
Place	Nation	Played	Won	Drawn	Lost	For	Against	Diff	4 Tries	7 Point Loss	Table points
1	Argentina Jaguars	3	3	0	0	111	32	+79	3	0	15
2	(United States) USA Selects	3	2	0	1	60	49	+11	1	0	9
3	Canada A	3	1	0	2	32	61	-29	0	0	4
4	Uruguay	3	0	0	3	20	81	-61	0	0	0

== Schedule ==
All times are in PDT (UTC−7).

11 October 2014
14:30

USA Selects (United States)	14–41	Argentina Jaguars
Try: Maupin; London; Con: Siddall (2/2)	Report	Try: Isaack (3); Báez; Díaz; Fernández; Con: Fernández (4/6); Pen: Fernández (1/1)

Canadian Rugby Centre of Excellence, Langford, British Columbia
Referee: A. Aso (JRFU)

11 October 2014
16:30

Canada A	20–6	Uruguay
Try: Barkwill; Gilmour; Con: McRorie (2/2); Pen: McRorie (2/2)	Report	Pen: Favaro (2/2)

Canadian Rugby Centre of Excellence, Langford, British Columbia
Referee: L. Linton (SRU)

15 October 2014
18:00

Argentina Jaguars	31–9	Uruguay
Try: Sábato; Paz; Guillemaín; Lezana; Con: Miralles (4/4); Pen: Miralles (1/1)	Report	Pen: Arocena (2/2); Blengio (1/1)

Canadian Rugby Centre of Excellence, Langford, British Columbia
Referee: L. Linton (SRU)

15 October 2014
20:00

Canada A	3–16	(United States) USA Selects
Pen: McRorie (1/1)	Report	Try: Stanfill (2); Con: Siddall (0/2); Pen: Siddall (2/2)

Canadian Rugby Centre of Excellence, Langford, British Columbia
Referee: J. Sylvestre (UAR)

19 October 2014
14:30

(United States) USA Selects	30–5	Uruguay
Try: Pinkelman; T. Stanfill (2); L. Stanfill; Con: Siddall (1/3); Niua (1/1); Pen: Siddall (2/2)	Report	Try: Magno; Con: Durán

Canadian Rugby Centre of Excellence, Langford, British Columbia
Referee: J. Sylvestre (UAR)

19 October 2014
16:30

Canada A	9–39	Argentina Jaguars
Pen: McRorie (3/3)	Report	Try: Paz (2); Báez; Cortese; Montoya; Con: Fernández (4/5); Pen: Fernández (2/2)

Canadian Rugby Centre of Excellence, Langford, British Columbia
Referee: A. Aso (JRFU)
