= 2010 Americas Rugby Championship =

2010 ARC Season
- League: Americas Rugby Championship
- Sport: Rugby Union
- Duration: 5–15 October 2010
- Number of teams: 4
- Finals champions: Argentina Jaguars

NA4/ARC seasons
- ← 2009 2012 →

The 2010 Americas Rugby Championship season was the second season of the Americas Rugby Championship. This was the only edition of the tournament in which Tonga A was featured.

== Teams participating ==
- Argentina Jaguars
- Canada Selects
- Tonga A
- USA Select XV

== Table ==
Place	Nation	Games				Points			Bonus points		Table points
Place	Nation	Played	Won	Drawn	Lost	For	Against	Diff	4 Tries	7 Point Loss	Table points
1	Argentina Jaguars	3	3	0	0	122	46	+76	2	0	14
2	Canada A	3	2	0	1	63	71	−8	0	0	9
3	(United States) USA Selects	3	1	0	2	38	77	−39	0	0	4
4	Tonga A	3	0	0	3	51	80	−29	0	1	1

== Schedule ==
5 October 2010

Tonga A	15–20	USA Select XV
Try: Tupou; Vi; Con: Mateo (1/1); Apikotoa (1/1); Pen: Apikotoa (0/2); Lemoto (1/1)	Report	Try: Danahy; Enosa; Manoa; Con: Malifa (1/3); Pen: Malifa (1/1)

Estadio Olímpico Chateau Carreras
Attendance: 300

5 October 2010

Canada Selects	14–49	Argentina Jaguars
Try: McKeen; Con: Braid (0/1); Pen: Braid (3/3)	Report	Try: Tuculet; Comuzzi; Guidone; Fessia; Gosio 2 Senatore; Con: Mieres (4/6); Sánchez (0/1); Pen: Mieres (2/2)

Estadio Olímpico Chateau Carreras
Attendance: 1,500

10 October 2010

Tonga A	16–32	Canada Selects
Try: Lemoto; Con: Apikotoa; Pen: Lemoto (2/3)	Report	Try: Buydens; MacSween; Pletch; Smith; Tomlinson; Con: Braid (2/5); Pen: Braid (1/2)

Estadio Olímpico Chateau Carreras
Attendance: 900
Referee: Chris Henshall

10 October 2010

Argentina Jaguars	45–12	USA Select XV
Try: Ascarate; Miralles (2); Senatore; Estelles; Tuculet; Con: Sánchez (3/6); Pen: Sánchez (3/4)	Report	Try: Biller; Manoa; Con: Rouse (0/1); Malifa (1/1); Pen: Rouse (0/1)

Estadio Olímpico Chateau Carreras
Attendance: 2,500
Referee: Bryan Arciero

15 October 2010

Argentina Jaguars	28–20	Tonga A
Try: Imhoff; Landajo; Gosio; Con: Mieres (1/2); Sánchez (1/1); Pen: Mieres (2/2); Sánchez (1/1)	Report	Try: Fakafanua; Lemoto; Con: Apikotoa (2/2); Pen: Apikotoa (1/2)

Estadio Olímpico Chateau Carreras
Attendance: 1,100

15 October 2010

USA Select XV	6–17	Canada Selects
Pen: Malifa (2/2)	Report	Try: Marshall; Con: Braid (0/1); Pen: Braid (4/5)

Estadio Olímpico Chateau Carreras
Attendance: 600
