= 2016 World Rugby Pacific Challenge =

Rugby union tournament

- Countries: Fiji (1 team); Japan (1 team); Samoa (1 team); Tonga (1 team)
- Date: 8–21 March 2016
- Champions: Fiji
- Runners-up: Samoa

The 2016 Pacific Challenge was the eleventh World Rugby Pacific Challenge. Four teams featured in the tournament which was hosted in Fiji. The tournament was won by Fiji Warriors, who defeated Samoa A by 36–0 in the final.

== Format ==
The teams played against each other initially in a round-robin competition, after which the top two sides played off in a final and the bottom two sides played off for third place. The 2016 Pacific Challenge was also a testing ground for the new points system that World Rugby was trialling, where tries were valued at six points instead of five and penalty goals and drop goals were valued at two points instead of three.

== Teams ==
The four teams competing:

- Junior Japan
- Samoa A
- Fiji Warriors
- Tonga A

== Table ==
Team	Played	Won	Drawn	Lost	For	Against	Diff	BP1	BP2	Pts
Fiji Warriors	3	3	0	0	134	34	+100	3	0	15
Samoa A	3	2	0	1	98	56	+42	2	0	10
Junior Japan	3	1	0	2	58	94	-36	0	0	4
Tonga A	3	0	0	3	26	132	-106	0	0	0
Updated: 21 March 2016 Source: World Rugby

== Match results ==
=== Round 1 ===
8 March 2016	Junior Japan	26–8	Tonga A	ANZ Stadium, Suva
3:30pm	Try: Doga Maeda; Takuhei Yasuda; Syokei Kim; Con: Ryoto Nakamura (3); Pen: Ryoto Nakamura	Summary	Try: Tuihakavalu Ika; Pen: Sosefo Ma’ake	Attendance: 500

8 March 2016	Fiji Warriors	34–6	Samoa A	ANZ Stadium, Suva
6pm		Summary		Attendance: 2, 000

=== Round 2 ===
12 March 2016	Samoa A	50–0	Tonga A	ANZ Stadium, Suva
3:30pm

12 March 2016	Fiji Warriors	44–10	Junior Japan	ANZ Stadium, Suva
6pm

=== Round 3 ===
17 March 2016	Samoa A	42–22	Junior Japan	ANZ Stadium, Suva
3:30pm

17 March 2016	Fiji Warriors	56–18	Tonga A	ANZ Stadium, Suva
6pm

== Finals ==
Third place play-off	21 March 2016	Junior Japan	30–44	Tonga A	ANZ Stadium, Suva
	3:30pm		Report; Summary		Attendance: 630

Final	21 March 2016	Fiji Warriors	36–0	Samoa A	ANZ Stadium, Suva
	6pm	Try: penalty try 19'; Raiyala 35'; Wakaya 54'; Ucutabua 71'; Hickes 74'; Con: Vularika (1/3) 75'; Ratu (1/1) 36'	Report; Summary		Attendance: 4,000
