= Punjas Rugby Series =

The Punjas Rugby Series was a rugby union challenge series played between Fiji A and Tonga A. It was sponsored by Fijian company Punja & Sons and played in Fiji in 2010 and 2011. There was some discussion about expanding the series to include teams from Samoa, the Cook Islands and Papua New Guinea, but this did not eventuate and the series ended after the 2011 edition.

== Punjas Rugby Series 2010 ==
16 April 2010
19:00, UTC+12

Fiji Warriors	13–27	Tonga A
Try: Mocetadra; Con: Rawaqa (1/1); Pen: Rawaqa (2)	Report	Try: Feʻao; Vaiomoʻunga; Con: Palu (1/2); Pen: Palu (5)

National Stadium, Suva

23 April 2010

Fiji Warriors	21–3	Tonga A
Pen: Rawaqa (7)	Report	Pen: Palu (1)

Churchill Park, Lautoka

- Fiji A won the series 34–30 on aggregate.

== Punjas Rugby Series 2011 ==
13 August 2011

Fiji Warriors	27–12	Tonga A
	Report

Churchill Park, Lautoka

19 August 2011

Fiji Warriors	20–32	Tonga A
	Report

Churchill Park, Lautoka

- Fiji A won the series 47–44 on aggregate.
