= 2017 World Rugby Pacific Challenge =

Rugby union tournament

- Date: 10–18 March 2017
- Champions: Fiji
- Runners-up: Japan
- Matches played: 6

The 2017 Pacific Challenge was the twelfth World Rugby Pacific Challenge. Four teams featured in the tournament which was hosted in Fiji. The format was a round-robin competition without additional finals play-off matches. The hosts Fiji Warriors finished the tournament undefeated to claim the title, with Junior Japan as runner-up.

== Closed law trials ==
In accordance with World Rugby's global law trials, which began on 1 January 2017 in the southern hemisphere, several variations to the laws of the game focused around the scrum and ruck areas were adopted for the tournament.

Law variations for the 2017 World Rugby Pacific Challenge

Law 20.1 (g) Forming a scrum: The referee will call “crouch” and then “bind”. In the “crouch” position the front rows will be shoulder to shoulder with their opponents, stable and supporting their own weight without pushing. On the “bind” call the props will position their arms in the correct ‘bind’ position [the current Law 20.1 (g) outlines the correct bind]. The front rows (+ back 5 players) will tighten binds and set themselves for the throw-in. The ball is then thrown-in without delay as per Law 20.5.

Law 20.5 and Law 20.6 (d) Throwing the ball into the scrum: No signal from Referee. The rationale is that the scrum-half may receive a signal from his hooker that the hooker is ready. This may encourage the hooker to prepare to strike for the ball. The proposal is intended to give the advantage to the team throwing-in the ball. The scrum must be stable prior to feed, and the ball fed without delay in accordance with current law. The scrum half must throw the ball in straight, but is allowed to align his shoulder on the middle line of the scrum, therefore allowing him to stand a shoulder width towards his side of the middle line. This is designed to further promote scrum stability and enhance player welfare by reducing the pressure on the hooker striking the ball.

Law 20.8 (b): Striking after the throw-in: Once the ball touches the ground in the tunnel, any front row player may use either foot to try to win possession of the ball. One player from the team who put the ball in must strike for the ball. Sanction: Free Kick.

The U19 variation – Law 20.9: 1.5 meter limit push everywhere on pitch apart from a 5 meter scrum. Sanction: Free Kick. The trial will also allow the No.8 to pick out of second row feet at a 5m scrums only.

Law 15.4 (c): The tackler must get up before playing the ball and then can only play from his side of the tackle gate:

Amended ruck definition – Law 16: A ruck commences when at least one player is on their feet and over the ball which is on the ground (tackled player, tackler). At this point the offside line is created. A player on his feet may use his hands to pick up the ball as long as this is immediate. As soon as an opposition player arrives no hands can be used.

== Teams ==
The four teams competing were:

- Junior Japan
- Samoa A
- Fiji Warriors
- Tonga A

== Table ==
Team	Played	Won	Drawn	Lost	For	Against	Diff	BP1	BP2	Pts
Fiji Warriors	3	3	0	0	125	71	+54	2	0	15
Junior Japan	3	2	0	1	92	103	-11	2	0	10
Tonga A	3	1	0	2	93	102	-9	2	0	6
Samoa A	3	0	0	3	78	112	-34	0	1	1
Updated: 10 March 2017 Source: rugbyarchive.net

== Match results ==
=== Round 1 ===
10 March 2017	Junior Japan	34–31	Samoa A	ANZ Stadium, Suva
3:30pm	Try: Tatafu (3); Iino; Con: Saito (4); Pen: Saito (2)	Summary	Try: Alofipo; Thomsen-Fuataga; Tapili; Con: Fa'apale (2); Pen: Fa'apale (4)

10 March 2017	Fiji Warriors	38–30	Tonga A	ANZ Stadium, Suva
5:30pm	Try: Raiyala (2); Narumasa; Voka; Stewart; Vularika; Con: Waqatabu (4)	Summary	Try: Lolohea (2); Ika; Con: Faiva (3); Pen: Faiva (3)

=== Round 2 ===
14 March 2017	Samoa A	22–30	Tonga A	ANZ Stadium, Suva
3:30pm	Try: Tusitala; Malielegaoi; Penalty Try*; Con: Fa'apale; Pen: Fa'apale	Summary	Try: Kaumavae (2); Ika; Sekona; Con: Faiva; Pen: Faiva

14 March 2017	Fiji Warriors	39–16	Junior Japan	ANZ Stadium, Suva
5:30pm	Try: Ralulu; Suguturaqa; Takubu; Lawaniyavi; Daveta; Con: Ralulu (4); Pen: Ralulu; Vularika	Summary	Try: Tatafu; Con: Saito; Pen: Saito (3)

- A penalty try = 7 points, no need to kick conversions.

=== Round 3 ===
18 March 2017	Tonga A	33–42	Junior Japan	ANZ Stadium, Suva
12:30pm		Summary

18 March 2017	Fiji Warriors	48–25	Samoa A	ANZ Stadium, Suva
3:30pm		Summary

Fiji Warriors
Pacific Challenge Champion
7th title
