= 1987 New Zealand rugby union tour of Japan =

Summary
| P | W | D | L |
Total
| 5 | 5 | 0 | 0 |
Test match
| 2 | 2 | 0 | 0 |
Opponent
| P | W | D | L |
Japan
| 2 | 2 | 0 | 0 |

The 1987 New Zealand rugby union tour of Japan was a series of five matches played by the New Zealand national rugby union team (the All Blacks) in Japan in October and November 1987. The All Blacks won all five matches; two of them were test matches against the Japan national rugby union team.

== Results ==
Scores and results list All Black's points tally first.

| Opponent | For | Against | Date | Venue | Status |
|---|---|---|---|---|---|
| Japan B | 94 | 0 | 21 October 1987 | Olympic Stadium, Tokyo | Tour match |
| Japan | 74 | 0 | 25 October 1987 | Hanazono, Osaka | Test match |
| Asian Barbarians | 96 | 3 | 28 October 1987 | Nishikyogoku, Kyoto | Tour match |
| Japan | 106 | 4 | 1 November 1987 | Olympic Stadium, Tokyo | Test match |
| J.R.U. Presidents XV | 38 | 9 | 4 November 1987 | Olympic Stadium, Tokyo | Tour match |
