= Taniela Rawaqa =

Fijian rugby union player (born 1986)

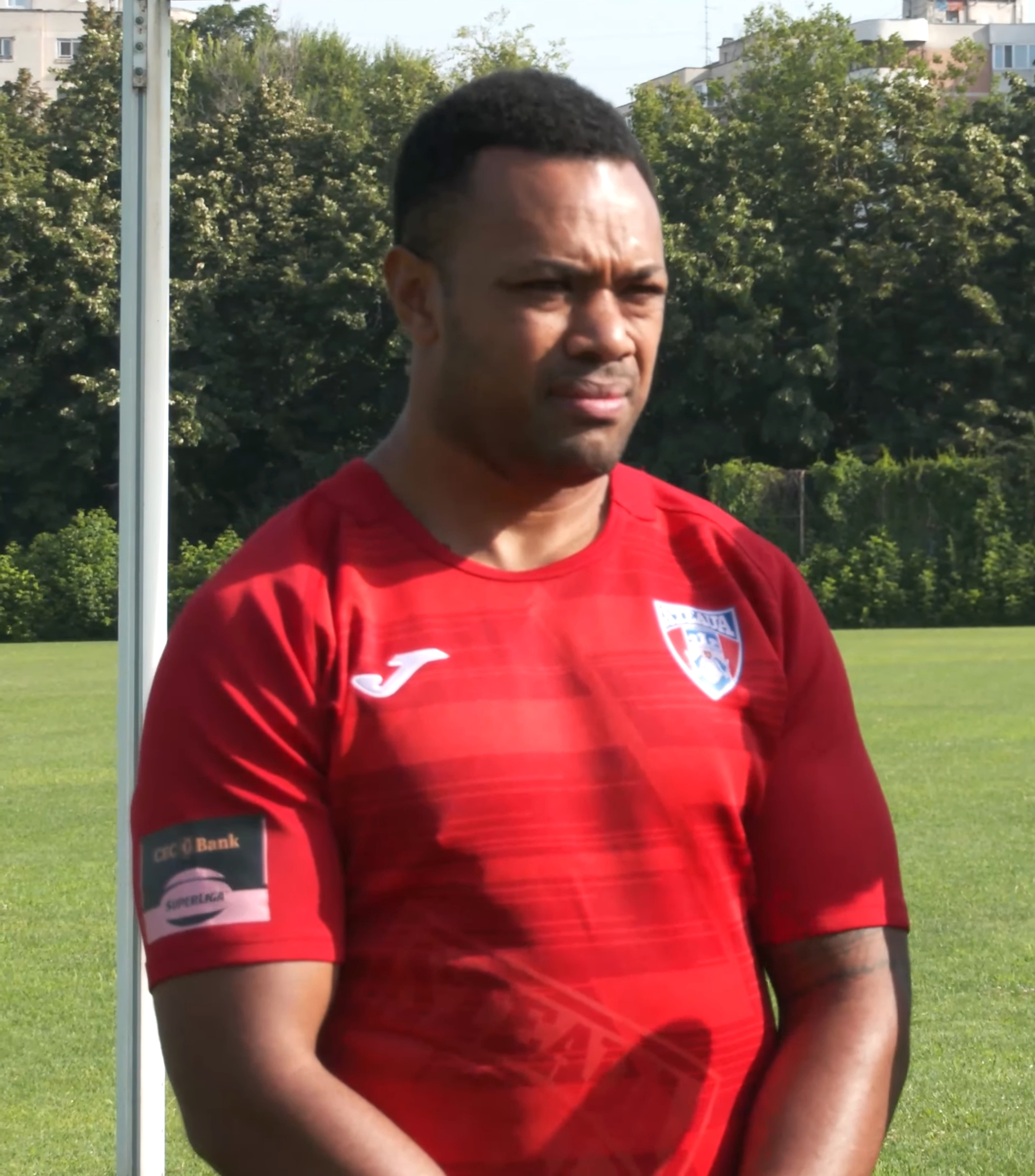
- Taniela Rawaqa in 2021
- Born: Ratu Taniela Rawaqa Maravunawasawasa; April 30, 1986 (age 40) Lautoka, Fiji
- Height: 1.79 m (5 ft 10 1/2 in)
- Weight: 90 kg (14 st 2 lb; 200 lb)
- Notable relative: Ifereimi Rawaqa

Rugby union career
- Position: Fullback
- Current team: Navy SC
Senior career
Years	Team	Apps	(Points)
2008	SU Agen		
2009	FC Grenoble		
2012	Navy SC		
International career
Years	Team	Apps	(Points)
2007–	Fiji	16	(103)
–	Fiji A		
–	Fiji 7s		
- Correct as of 2011-12-26

Taniela Rawaqa (born April 30, 1986) is a Fijian rugby union player. He plays fullback, presently with the Western Crusaders in the Colonial Cup and with the Fiji Warriors in the Pacific Rugby Cup and internationally with Fiji. He is the younger brother of Fijian International Ifereimi Rawaqa

He made his international debut against Samoa in the 2007 Pacific Nations Cup and was regarded and one of the greatest prospects and successor of Nicky Little. He also played for Fiji Sevens. He plays for Fiji A in the Punjas Rugby Series.

Rawaqa is currently the second highest points scorer in Pacific Nations Cup history with 103 points.

Rawaqa turned out for Jaffna Challengers in the Sri Lanka's Carlton Sevens Tournament in 2012.

He currently turns out for Navy Sports Club in the Sri Lankan Premier Rugby League whose team is captained by Yoshitha Rajapakse the Sri Lankan Rugby Captain and son of the Sri Lankan President.
