= 2013 Pacific Rugby Cup =

Rugby union tournament

- Countries: Fiji (1 team); Junior Japan (1 team); Samoa A (1 team); Tonga A (1 team)
- Champions: Fiji Warriors (5th title)
- Matches played: 24

The 2013 Pacific Rugby Cup was the eighth edition of the Pacific Rugby Cup competition. The tournament featured national 'A' teams from Fiji, Samoa, and Tonga, and the Junior Japan team which was added for the 2013 tournament. The format involved touring to play against Super Rugby development teams from Australia and New Zealand, and was intended include a round robin stage between the four core teams, but this leg of the tournament was cancelled to allow preparation for the end-of-year internationals.

== Teams ==
The four core teams:

- Fiji Warriors
- Junior Japan
- Samoa A
- Tonga A

Australian opposition:

- (Australian Capital Territory) ACT XV
- (New South Wales) Junior Waratahs
- (Victoria (state)) Rebel Rising
- (Queensland) Reds College XV
- (Western Australia) Western Force A
- (Australia) ARU Brisbane Academy
- (Australia) ARU Sydney Academy

New Zealand opposition:

- (New Zealand) Blues Development
- (New Zealand) Chiefs Development
- (New Zealand) Crusaders Knights
- (New Zealand) Highlanders Development
- (New Zealand) Hurricanes Development

== Table ==
=== Core Teams ===
Team	Played	Won	Drawn	Lost	For	Against	Diff	BP1	BP2	Pts
Fiji Warriors	6	2	2	2	118	155	-37	2	0	14
Samoa A	6	2	0	4	134	198	-64	1	1	10
Junior Japan	6	0	0	6	140	361	-221	3	0	3
Tonga A	6	0	0	6	73	306	-233	0	0	0
Updated: 7 April 2013; Source: oceaniarugby.com

Competition rules
Points breakdown:
4 points for a win
2 points for a draw
1 bonus point for a loss by seven points or less
1 bonus point for scoring four or more tries in a match
Classification:
Teams standings are calculated as follows:
Most log points accumulated from all matches
Most log points accumulated in matches between tied teams
Highest difference between points scored for and against accumulated from all matches
Most points scored accumulated from all matches
