= Americas Rugby Championship =

Rugby union tournament of the Americas

- Current season, competition or edition: 2026 Americas Rugby Championship
- Sport: Rugby union
- Founded: 2009; 17 years ago (reinaugurated 2016; 10 years ago)
- No. of teams: 6
- Country: Argentina XV; Brazil; Canada; Chile; United States; Uruguay
- Most recent champions: Chile (1st title)
- Most titles: Argentina XV (6 titles)

The Americas Rugby Championship, often informally called the Americas' Six Nations, is an annual international rugby tournament between six North and South American nations: Argentina, Brazil, Canada, Chile, the United States and Uruguay.

The original Americas Rugby Championship (organised by World Rugby) was inaugurated in 2009, when various combinations of national, regional and development teams from North and South America competed for the title. In 2015, it was announced that from 2016, the competition would reform under the guidance of the Americas Rugby Association and the respective unions, to provide the six national sides with additional rankings tests annually. The updated format was based on the structure of the European Six Nations Championship, coinciding with each other in February and March of each year. Prior to this, the last competitive tournament to be held across the Sudamérica–RAN region had been the PARA Pan American Championship, which had ceased after its 2003 edition. World Rugby granted all matches with test match status, with caps awarded for every match, with the exception of those involving the Argentina XV side.

== History ==
=== First conception ===
Originally formed in 2009 by World Rugby (then known as the International Rugby Board) to replace the North America 4 Series, was created to give the newly formed Canadian regions more competitive matches against strong opposition from the second teams of the United States and Argentina. The winner of the inaugural Canadian Rugby Championship, BC Bears, went on to compete on the international stage, playing the winner of the international semi-final match between USA Select XV and Argentina Jaguars. The Argentina Jaguars defeated the BC Bears 35–11 in the final to capture the tournament's first title.

=== Second and third editions ===
In 2010, the tournament was cut from 6 to 4 teams, scrapping the Canadian Division part of the tournament to create a solely international based tournament for development sides. The USA Select XV and Argentina Jaguars were joined by the second team from Tonga, and a Canada Selects side made up of the top players in the 2010 CRC season. Each team played each other once in a round-robin format, gaining 4 points for a win, with the team on the most points at the end winning the title.

The tournament returned in 2012, having not taken place in 2011 due to the 2011 Rugby World Cup. The tournament kept the same format as 2010, however the national side of Uruguay joined the tournament replacing Tonga A, though in 2014, Uruguay sent their second team Charrúas XV. Argentina Jaguars went on to win every tournament between 2012 and 2014.

=== National sides conception ===
The tournament was not held in 2015 because of the 2015 Rugby World Cup. In 2016, the tournament was relaunched and expanded to six teams with the inclusion of Brazil and Chile. Unlike the previous single-site tournament featuring lesser sides, the new tournament was held in February and March, concurrently with the European Six Nations Championship. Like the European championship, teams played both home and away, whereas players from European clubs will be available.

=== Americas Rugby Challenge ===
A second competition, the Americas Rugby Challenge or ARCh was confirmed in August 2018, to be played in August and September. The inaugural competition took place at the Estadio Cincuentenario in Medellín, Colombia from August 24 to September 1.

The new competition brought together Rugby Americas North (RAN) and Sudamérica Rugby, following the example of the Americas Rugby Championship, The Americas Rugby Challenge is officially the 'B' competition for the ARC.

As with the Americas Rugby Championship, the new Americas Rugby Challenge saw all competing countries playing against each other. The first edition of the competition was a Four Nations tournament with Rugby Americas North and Sudamérica Rugby both having two representatives each.

The host nation of Colombia were joined by Sudamérica Rugby rivals Paraguay. Guyana and Mexico represented Rugby Americas North.

== Format ==
Played annually, the format of the Championship was simple: each team played every other team once in a round-robin format, making for a total of 15 matches played across the tournament. For each win, a team picked up 4 points and 2 for a draw. The team with the most points at the end won the title. Unlike previous ARC, overseas based players were available for selection, while Argentina mainly selected provincial and domestic players that were not part of their Super Rugby Jaguares side.

== Teams ==
=== Current teams ===
- Argentina XV
- Chile
- Paraguay
- Uruguay

=== Past teams ===
- (Canada) BC Bears: 2009
- (Canada) Ontario Blues: 2009
- (Canada) Prairie Wolf Pack: 2009
- (Canada) The Rock: 2009
- Tonga A: 2010
- Argentina Jaguars: 2009–2014
- USA Selects 2009–2014
- Canada A: 2009–2019
- United States (Declined 2026 Invitation)
- Brazil (Declined 2026 Invitation)

== Previous winners ==
Year	Teams	Champions	Games played	Games won	Games drawn	Games lost	Points for	Points against	Points difference	Bonus points	Table points
2009	6	Argentina Jaguars	2	2	0	0	92	21	+71	N/A	
2010	4	Argentina Jaguars	3	3	0	0	122	46	+76	2	14
2012	4	Argentina Jaguars	3	3	0	0	88	22	+66	1	13
2013	4	Argentina Jaguars	3	3	0	0	84	23	+61	2	14
2014	4	Argentina Jaguars	3	3	0	0	111	32	+79	3	15
2016	6	Argentina XV	5	4	1	0	207	99	+108	4	22
2017	6	United States	5	4	1	0	215	96	+119	4	22
2018	6	United States	5	5	0	0	197	68	+129	4	24
2019	6	Argentina XV	5	5	0	0	258	60	+198	5	25
2020	Cancelled due to COVID-19 pandemic.										
2026	4	Chile	3	3	0	0	115	65	+50	3	15

== Past results ==
First Conception
Season	Stadium	Location	Champion	Score	Runner-up
2009	Fletcher's Fields	Markham, Ontario, Canada	Argentina Jaguars	35–11	(Canada) BC Bears
2010	Estadio Olímpico Chateau Carreras	Córdoba, Argentina	Argentina Jaguars	Round Robin	Canada A
2012	Westhills Stadium	Langford, British Columbia, Canada	Argentina Jaguars	Round Robin	Canada A
2013	Westhills Stadium	Langford, British Columbia, Canada	Argentina Jaguars	Round Robin	USA Selects
2014	Westhills Stadium	Langford, British Columbia, Canada	Argentina Jaguars	Round Robin	USA Selects
Second Conception
Season	Stadium	Location	Champion	Score	Runner-up
2016	Various (3/2 home games, 2/3 away games)		Argentina Jaguars	Round Robin	United States
2017	Various (3/2 home games, 2/3 away games)		United States	Round Robin	Argentina Jaguars
2018	Various (3/2 home games, 2/3 away games)		United States	Round Robin	Argentina Jaguars
2019	Various (3/2 home games, 2/3 away games)		Argentina Jaguars	Round Robin	Uruguay
2020	Cancelled due to COVID-19 pandemic				
2026	Various (3 games)		Chile	Round Robin	Argentina XV

== All-time results table ==
Nation	Appearances	Games	Wins	Draws	Losses	Best result
Argentina XV (Jaguars)	10	37	33	2	2	Champions: (7) 2009, 2010, 2012, 2013, 2014, 2016, 2019
Chile	5	23	4		19	Champions: 2026
Uruguay	8	29	15		17	Runner-up: 2019
Paraguay	1	3	0		1	4th place: 2026
United States	4	20	14	2	4	Champions: 2017, 2018
Canada	4	20	7		13	3rd place: 2016
Brazil	4	20	6		14	4th place: 2017, 2019
USA Selects	5	14	4		10	Runner-up: 2013, 2014
Canada A (Selects)	4	12	6		6	Runner-up: 2010 & 2012
Tonga A	1	3	0		3	4th place: 2010
(Canada) BC Bears	1	5	4		1	Runner-up: 2009
(Canada) Ontario Blues	1	5	2		3	3rd place: 2009
(Canada) Prairie Wolf Pack	1	3	1		2	6th place: 2009
(Canada) The Rock	1	3	1		2	5th place: 2009

Updated to after 2026 Americas Rugby Championship

=== Results by nation ===
Nation	Years represented	Champions	Runner-up
Argentina	10	7	2
Brazil	4	0	0
Canada	9	0	3
Chile	5	1	0
Paraguay	1	0	0
Tonga	1	0	0
United States	9	2	3
Uruguay	8	0	1
