= 2012 Pacific Rugby Cup =

Rugby union tournament

- Countries: Fiji (1 team); Samoa (1 team); Tonga (1 team)
- Champions: Fiji Warriors (4th title)
- Matches played: 18

The 2012 Pacific Rugby Cup was the seventh edition of the Pacific Rugby Cup competition.

The tournament featured national 'A' teams from the three Pacific rugby unions as well as Super Rugby development teams from Australia and New Zealand.

== Teams ==
The three core teams:

- Fiji Warriors
- Samoa A
- Tonga A

Australian opposition:

- (Australian Capital Territory) Brumby Runners
- (New South Wales) Junior Waratahs
- Queensland A

New Zealand opposition:

- (New Zealand) Blues Development
- (New Zealand) Chiefs Development
- (New Zealand) Crusaders Knights
- (New Zealand) Highlanders Development
- (New Zealand) Hurricanes Development

== Table ==
=== Core Teams ===
Team	Played	Won	Drawn	Lost	For	Against	Diff	BP1	BP2	Pts
Fiji Warriors	8	7	0	1	205	165	40	3	0	31
Samoa A	8	3	0	5	191	238	-47	0	1	13
Tonga A	8	1	1	6	72	253	-181	0	0	6
Updated: 20 October 2012; Source: oceaniarugby.com

Competition rules
Points breakdown:
4 points for a win
2 points for a draw
1 bonus point for a loss by seven points or less
1 bonus point for scoring four or more tries in a match
Classification:
Teams standings are calculated as follows:
Most log points accumulated from all matches
Most log points accumulated in matches between tied teams
Highest difference between points scored for and against accumulated from all matches
Most points scored accumulated from all matches
