= Ramiro Moyano =

Argentine rugby union player (born 1990)

- Born: May 28, 1990 (age 36) Tucumán, Argentina
- Height: 5 ft 11 in (1.80 m)
- Weight: 187 lb (13 st 5 lb; 85 kg)

Rugby union career
- Position(s): Full-back, Wing
Amateur team(s)
Years	Team	Apps	(Points)
2007-	Lince RC		
Senior career
Years	Team	Apps	(Points)
2011–2015	Pampas XV	16	(30)
2019–2021	Toulon	11	(15)
2021–2022	Edinburgh Rugby	13	(45)
Super Rugby
Years	Team	Apps	(Points)
2016−2019	Jaguares	40	(85)
- Correct as of 31 May 2022
International career
Years	Team	Apps	(Points)
2009	Argentina U-19		
2010	Argentina U-20	5	(10)
2011–	Argentina	40	(50)
2012–2014	Argentina Jaguars	8	(10)
- Correct as of 31 May 2022
National sevens team
Years	Team		Comps
2012–2016	Argentina		14 (150)

Ramiro Moyano (born 28 May 1990, in Tucumán, Argentina) is an Argentine rugby union player who plays for the national Argentina team The Pumas and most recently at club level for Edinburgh Rugby in the United Rugby Championship. Moyano mostly plays as a full-back but has on occasions played wing.

Having played for his local club Lince RC from a young age, he was selected for the Argentina U-19's team in 2009 before going on to represent Argentina U-20's in competitive tournaments in 2010. He represented the Pumitas in their home Junior World Championship playing in three games; Australia, England and France. He quickly moved on to the sevens circuit, playing in 16 competitions, including the 2013 Rugby World Cup Sevens in Moscow.

Between 2012 and 2014 he represented the Argentina Jaguars in the IRB Nations and Tbilisi Cup, where he helped the Jaguars to runner-up in the 2012 IRB Nations Cup and champions in the 2014 IRB Tbilisi Cup. Moyano was part of the Pampas XV side that won the 2011 Vodacom Cup beating the Blue Bulls 14–9. He was also part of the Pampas XV side that won back to back World Rugby Pacific Challenge titles in 2014 and 2015.

In 2011 he made his international senior debut, coming off the bench and scoring a try in Argentina's 61–6 win over Chile. The following week he gained his first start, starting at full-back against Uruguay. He continued to represent Argentina in the South American Rugby Championship while still playing sevens, and it wasn't until 2014 where he was called up to the Argentine side that would face a Tier 1 opposition - being named in a 33-man squad for their two-test series against Ireland - though did not make an appearance during the series.

In 2015, he was named in the inaugural Argentine Super Rugby team the Jaguares, where his first appearance came on 2 April 2016, in a 16–24 defeat to the Blues.

On 11 June 2016, he came off the bench against Italy in Argentina's 30–24 victory. This was Moyano's first cap for Argentina outside the South American Rugby Championship.

Moyano joined French club Toulon for the 2019–20 season.
