= 2026 Americas Rugby Championship =

Tournament details
- Host: Chile
- Dates: 29 August – 6 September 2026
- Countries: Argentina XV; Chile XV; Paraguay; Uruguay XV

Final positions
- Champions: Chile XV (1st title)
- Runner-up: Argentina XV

Tournament statistics
- Matches played: 6
- Tries scored: 59 (9.83 per match)

The 2026 Americas Rugby Championship is the tenth edition of the Americas Rugby Championship (ARC). It features four teams from South America: Argentina XV, Chile XV, Paraguay and Uruguay XV. It is the first edition of the tournament in seven years, which saw the competition disband following the COVID-19 pandemic.

== Background ==
In March 2026, the ARC was announced to be held on October 9–17 at the Estadio Héroes de Curupayty in Luque, just outside Paraguay's capital Asunción. Six teams were announced, with Paraguay replacing Canada, which had featured in all previous editions. Unlike the format used for all prior tournaments, it would see all teams grouped into two pools. Each team would play one match against every team in the opposing pool, with the team holding the most match points declared champions.

In June 2026, the tournament was pushed forward to 29 August, with Chile hosting all matches. The event was also reduced to four teams, as Brazil and the United States XV declined their invitations. Paraguay joined with their full Test team, whereas Argentina, Chile and Uruguay are believed to send their second XV teams.

Argentina XV are the defending champions from the 2019 tournament, having completed a Grand Slam.

The fixtures for the Championship were confirmed on 29 June 2026.

== Venues ==
Talcahuano	Location of venues: 1 Estadio Huachipato-CAP Acero, Talcahuano; 2 Escuela Militar, Las Condes (Santiago); 2 Estadio Elías Figueroa Brander, Valparaíso
Estadio Huachipato-CAP Acero	Location of venues: 1 Estadio Huachipato-CAP Acero, Talcahuano; 2 Escuela Militar, Las Condes (Santiago); 2 Estadio Elías Figueroa Brander, Valparaíso
Capacity: 10,032	Location of venues: 1 Estadio Huachipato-CAP Acero, Talcahuano; 2 Escuela Militar, Las Condes (Santiago); 2 Estadio Elías Figueroa Brander, Valparaíso
Las Condes (Santiago)	Location of venues: 1 Estadio Huachipato-CAP Acero, Talcahuano; 2 Escuela Militar, Las Condes (Santiago); 2 Estadio Elías Figueroa Brander, Valparaíso
Escuela Militar	Location of venues: 1 Estadio Huachipato-CAP Acero, Talcahuano; 2 Escuela Militar, Las Condes (Santiago); 2 Estadio Elías Figueroa Brander, Valparaíso
—N/a	Location of venues: 1 Estadio Huachipato-CAP Acero, Talcahuano; 2 Escuela Militar, Las Condes (Santiago); 2 Estadio Elías Figueroa Brander, Valparaíso
Valparaíso	Location of venues: 1 Estadio Huachipato-CAP Acero, Talcahuano; 2 Escuela Militar, Las Condes (Santiago); 2 Estadio Elías Figueroa Brander, Valparaíso
Estadio Elías Figueroa Brander	Location of venues: 1 Estadio Huachipato-CAP Acero, Talcahuano; 2 Escuela Militar, Las Condes (Santiago); 2 Estadio Elías Figueroa Brander, Valparaíso
Capacity: 20,575	Location of venues: 1 Estadio Huachipato-CAP Acero, Talcahuano; 2 Escuela Militar, Las Condes (Santiago); 2 Estadio Elías Figueroa Brander, Valparaíso

== Table ==
Pos	Team	Pld	W	D	L	PF	PA	PD	TF	TA	TB	LB	Pts
1	Chile XV (H, C)	3	3	0	0	115	65	+50	17	10	3	0	15
2	Argentina XV	3	2	0	1	149	49	+100	24	7	3	1	12
3	Uruguay XV	3	1	0	2	63	109	−46	11	17	1	0	5
4	Paraguay	3	0	0	3	49	153	−104	7	25	1	0	1

(C) Champion; (H) Host

== Matches ==
=== Round 1 ===
29 August 2026
15:00 CLT (UTC-04)

(1 BP) Argentina XV	58–11	Paraguay
Try: Vaca (2) 10' m, 52' m Rossetto (2) 14' m, 33' m Dogliani 43' m Viola (2) 55' c, 77' c Greising Revol 62' m Avaca 66' c Coll 69' c Con: Serpa (4/5) 56', 67', 70', 78'	Report	Try: Miño 74' m Pen: Mussi (1/1) 38'; Guzmán (1/1) 46'; Cards: Sebriano (yellow card) 61'

Estadio Huachipato-CAP Acero, Talcahuano
Referee: Raimundo Fuenzalida (Chile)

29 August 2026
18:00 CLT (UTC-04)

(1 BP) Chile XV	33–12	Uruguay XV
Try: B. Videla 1' c A. Escobar 5' c Dittus 38' c Böhme 68' c M. Garafulic 71' m Con: S. Videla (4/5) 2', 6', 39', 69'; Cards: I. Gurruchaga (yellow card) 33'; C. Saavedra (red card) 52'	Report	Try: Myszka (2) 20' c, 34' m Con: Ferrario (1/2) 21'; Cards: Myszka (red card) 52'; Bianchi (red card) 52'

Estadio Huachipato-CAP Acero, Talcahuano
Referee: Federico Longobardi (Argentina)

=== Round 2 ===
2 September 2026
12:00 CLT (UTC-04)

(1 BP) Argentina XV	64–10	Uruguay XV
Try: Villagrán 6' m Avaca (3) 10' m, 16' c, 59' c Rossetto (2) 23' m, 62 c Estellès 28' c Dande 53' c Fernández Criado 55' c A Sugasti 77' m Con: Serpa (5/8) 17', 29', 54', 56', 60'; Dogliani (2/2) 63', 78'	Report	Try: S. Pérez 66' m Diana 74' m Cards: Facciolo (yellow card) 21'

Escuela Militar, Santiago
Referee: Sergio Alvarenga (Paraguay)

2 September 2026
15:00 CLT (UTC-04)

(1 BP) Chile XV	54–26	Paraguay (1 BP)
Try: López 1' c Milesi (2) 5' c, 38' c Alvano (2) 21' c, 49' c Torrealba 43' m Aguayo 60' c Roa 66' c Con: Salas (6/7) 1', 6', 22', 39', 50', 61'; Reyes (1/1) 67'; Cards: I. Gurruchaga (yellow card) 33'; C. Saavedra (red card) 52'	Report	Try: González 46' m Paiva 58' c Chávez 73' c Mussi 80' c Con: Mussi (3/4) 59', 74', 80'

Escuela Militar, Santiago
Referee: Armen Abi-Saab (Uruguay)

=== Round 3 ===
6 September 2026
13:00 CLT (UTC-04)

Paraguay	12–41	Uruguay XV
Try: Mussi 6' c Chávez 26' m Con: Mussi (1/2) 7'	Report	Try: Álvarez Akiki 13' m Alonso (2) 37' m, 59' c Kigel 44' c Ferrario (2) 56' c, 62' m Diana 64' m Con: S. Álvarez (1/4) 45'; Ferrario (2/3) 57', 60'

Estadio Elías Figueroa Brander, Valparaíso
Referee: Sebastián Toledo (Chile)

6 September 2026
16:00 CLT (UTC-04)

(1 BP) Chile XV	28–27	Argentina XV (1 BP)
Try: S. Videla 34' c B. Videla 52' c D. Saavedra 67' c Tchimino 78' c Con: M. Garafulic (4/4) 35', 53', 68', 79'	Report	Try: Pasquini 5' m Rossetto 27' c Vaca (2) 44' m, 55' c Con: Dogliani (2/4) 28', 56'; Pen: Dogliani (1/1) 22'; Cards: Correa (yellow card) 23'

Estadio Elías Figueroa Brander, Valparaíso
Referee: Sergio Alvarenga (Paraguay)

== See also ==
- 2026 Nations Cup
