= 2011 Pacific Rugby Cup =

Rugby union tournament

- Countries: Fiji (1 team); Samoa (1 team); Tonga (1 team)
- Champions: Fiji Warriors (3rd title)
- Matches played: 18

The 2011 Pacific Rugby Cup was the sixth edition of the Pacific Rugby Cup competition. The tournament featured national 'A' teams from the three Pacific rugby unions as well as Super Rugby development teams from Australia and New Zealand.

== Teams ==
The three core teams:

- Fiji Warriors
- Samoa A
- Tonga A

Australian opposition:

- (Australian Capital Territory) Brumby Runners
- (New South Wales) Junior Waratahs
- (Queensland) QAS Reds Academy

New Zealand opposition:

- (New Zealand) Chiefs Development
- (New Zealand) Crusaders Knights
- (New Zealand) Hurricanes Development

== Table ==
=== Core Teams ===
Team	Played	Won	Drawn	Lost	For	Against	Diff	BP1	BP2	Pts
Fiji Warriors	8	4	0	4	144	201	-57	0	1	17
Samoa A	8	3	0	5	135	171	-36	1	2	15
Tonga A	8	2	1	5	133	233	-100	0	1	11
Updated: 26 March 2011; Source: oceaniarugby.com

Competition rules
Points breakdown:
4 points for a win
2 points for a draw
1 bonus point for a loss by seven points or less
1 bonus point for scoring four or more tries in a match
Classification:
Teams standings are calculated as follows:
Most log points accumulated from all matches
Most log points accumulated in matches between tied teams
Highest difference between points scored for and against accumulated from all matches
Most points scored accumulated from all matches

=== New Zealand conference ===
Source: oceaniarugby.com

=== Australian conference ===
Source: oceaniarugby.com

== Matches ==
=== Round 1 ===
19/02/11	Junior Waratahs	28 – 18	Tonga A	Foreshaw Rugby Park
4:30pm

19/02/11	Brumby Runners	29 – 13	Samoa A	Canberra Stadium
5:15pm

19/02/11	QAS Reds Academy	26 – 27	Fiji Warriors	Ballymore Stadium, Brisbane
6:30pm

=== Round 2 ===
23/02/11	Junior Waratahs	12 – 15	Fiji Warriors	St Marys League Club
5:30pm

23/02/11	Brumby Runners	22 – 22	Tonga A	Viking Park Canberra
6:30pm

23/02/11	QAS Reds Academy	20 – 23	Samoa A	Ballymore Stadium, Brisbane
6:30pm

=== Round 3 ===
28/02/11	Junior Waratahs	12 – 35	Samoa A	St Marys League Club
5:30pm

28/02/11	QAS Reds Academy	22 – 23	Tonga A	Ballymore Stadium, Brisbane
6:30pm

28/02/11	Brumby Runners	30 – 28	Fiji Warriors	Viking Park Canberra
6:30pm

=== Round 4 ===
04/03/11	Crusaders Knights	55 – 7	Fiji Warriors	Carisbrook, Dunedin
2:00pm

04/03/11	Chiefs Development	50 – 13	Tonga A	ECOLight Stadium, Pukekohe
6:00pm

05/03/11	Hurricanes Development	33 – 0	Samoa A	Porirua Park, Porirua
4:00pm

=== Round 5 ===
09/03/11	Chiefs Development	25 – 10	Fiji Warriors	Blake Park, Mt Maunganui
5:00pm

09/03/11	Crusaders Knights	22 – 21	Samoa A	Fraser Park, Timaru
6:00pm

09/03/11	Hurricanes Development	41 – 10	Tonga A	Hutt Recreation Ground, Lower Hutt
7:00pm

=== Round 6 ===
14/03/11	Hurricanes Development	27 – 13	Fiji Warriors	Porirua Park, Porirua
4:00pm

14/03/11	Crusaders Knights	36 – 18	Tonga A	Lincoln University, Christchurch
5:00pm

14/03/11	Chiefs Development	17 – 18	Samoa A	ECOLight Stadium, Pukekohe
6:00pm

=== Round 7 ===
19/03/11	Fiji Warriors	21 – 14	Tonga A	Churchill Park, Lautoka
3:30pm

Bye/s: Samoa A

=== Round 8 ===
22/03/11	Samoa A	12 – 23	Fiji Warriors	Churchill Park, Lautoka
4:30pm

Bye/s: Tonga A

=== Round 9 ===
26/03/11	Tonga A	15 – 13	Samoa A	Lawaqa Park, Sigatoka
3:30pm

Bye/s: Fiji Warriors
