= Ifereimi Rawaqa =

Fiji international rugby union player

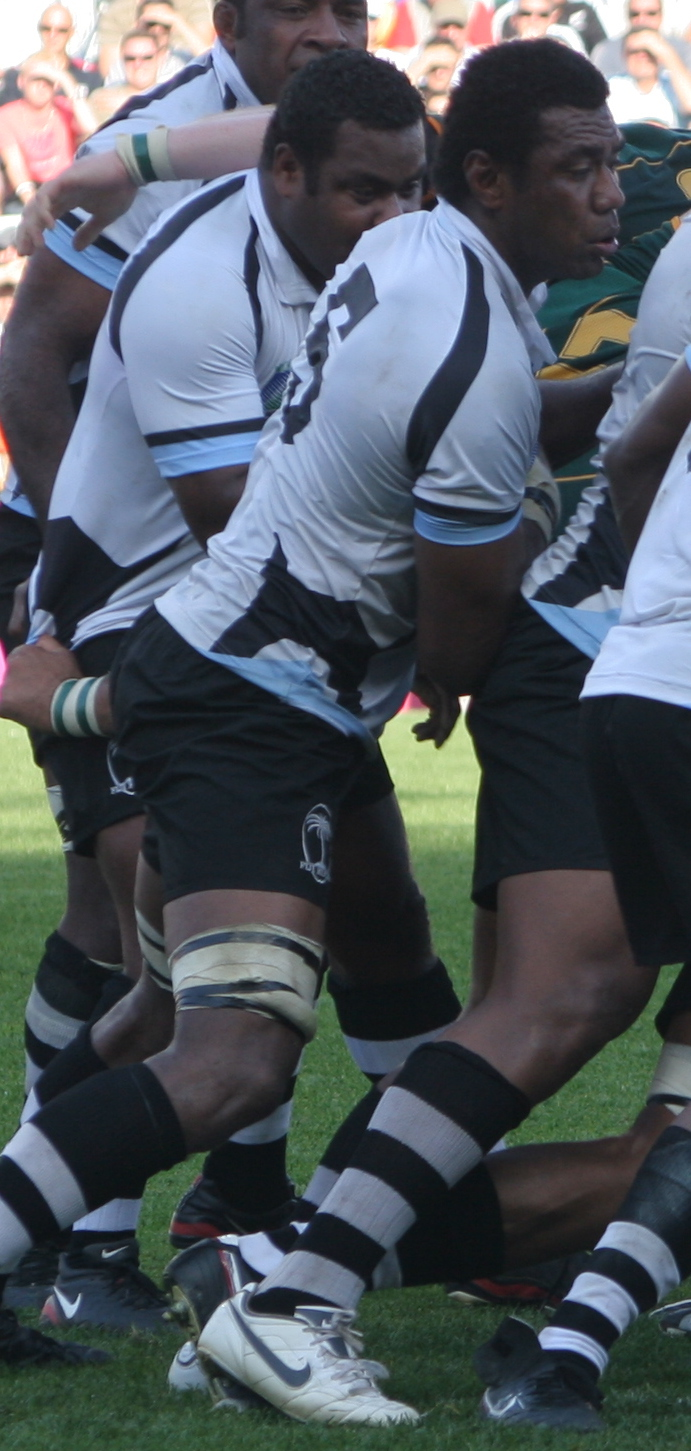
- South Africa vs Fiji during 2007 Rugby World Cup
- Born: 20 September 1980 (age 46) Vuda, Lautoka, Fiji
- Height: 1.99 m (6 ft 6 in)
- Weight: 113 kg (17 st 11 lb)
- Notable relative: Taniela Rawaqa

Rugby union career
- Position(s): Lock, Flanker
Senior career
Years	Team	Apps	(Points)
1997–1997	Vuda		
1997–2003	Lautoka		
2004–2009	Fighting Bull		
2010–	Shuttles		
International career
Years	Team	Apps	(Points)
2002–	Fiji	36	(15)
2004	Pacific Islanders	3	(0)

Ifereimi Rawaqa (born 20 September 1980, in Vuda, Lautoka, Fiji) is a Fijian rugby union player. He plays as a lock or flanker.

== Career ==
In 2002, when he was still 21 when he made his test debut in the victory over Samoa, in Apia. After four matches as a substitute, he made his first start against Tonga in the 47–20 win at Prince Charles Park in Nadi, and celebrated with a well-worked try from 35 metres out when he raced onto a chip over the top from Seru Rabeni. His build makes him an ideal line-out jumper, but he is also equipped with speed to match most wingers.

Injury saw him miss the 2003 early-season trials and he did not feature in the warm-up matches against Australia or Tonga. When Apenisa Naevo pulled up late in the first match of the New Zealand tour last August, Rawaqa was called up. He also led his provincial team Lautoka to both major trophies in Fiji in 2003 – the Telecom Cup and the Farebrother-Sullivan Trophy, which is a challenge competition similar to New Zealand's Ranfurly Shield.

In 2004 Rawaqa was selected in the Pacific Islanders team where he started all 3 test matches. After an impressive showing for the Islanders he was offered a contract to play for Auckland but turned it down preferring to play for Japanese club World Fighting Bull.

Rawaqa showed his pace when he outran the Wales backline to score under the posts in what was so nearly an historic win for Fiji at Cardiff in 2005, when Fiji lost 11–10.https://www.youtube.com/watch?v=cKnR1n2DDTY

He has played at two world cups, 2003 and 2007 being part of the historical quarter-final reaching team. He was also part of Fiji's 2005 Rugby World Cup Sevens winning team.

He is the elder brother of Fijian International Taniela Rawaqa who plays fullback for Fiji.
