= 2014 Pacific Rugby Cup =

Rugby union tournament

- Countries: Argentina (1 team); Australia (4 teams); Fiji (1 team); Japan (1 team); Samoa (1 team); Tonga (1 team)
- Champions: Pampas XV (1st title)
- Matches played: 20

The 2013 Pacific Rugby Cup was the eighth edition of the Pacific Rugby Cup competition. The tournament featured national 'A' rugby union teams from Fiji, Samoa, Tonga, Japan and Argentina. Additionally, four Super Rugby development sides joined the five Pacific sides as core teams for the first time. These Australian teams had previously only been opposition sides for the core teams and were not in contention for the title.

The tournament was played in Australia. The teams were split into two pools and a single round robin series was played in each pool, with the top team in each pool playing in the final for the PRC title. Argentina's Pampas XV won the Cup, going through the tournament undefeated.

== Teams ==
The 5 Pacific core teams:

- (Argentina) Pampas XV
- Fiji Warriors
- Junior Japan
- Samoa A
- Tonga A

The 4 Australian core teams:

- (Australian Capital Territory) ACT XV
- (New South Wales) Gen Blue (Watarahs A)
- (Queensland) Reds A
- (Western Australia) Western Force A

Additional Australian opposition:

- (New South Wales) NSW Under 20
- Queensland Under 20

== Standings ==
=== Pool A ===
Team	Played	Won	Drawn	Lost	For	Against	Diff	BP1	BP2	Pts
Reds A	3	2	0	1	126	55	71	2	1	11
Fiji Warriors	3	2	0	1	154	59	95	2	1	11
Force A	3	2	0	1	114	65	49	2	0	10
Junior Japan	3	0	0	3	26	241	-210	0	0	0
Updated: 23 March 2014; Source: oceaniarugby.com

=== Pool B ===
Team	Played	Won	Drawn	Lost	For	Against	Diff	BP1	BP2	Pts
Pampas XV	4	4	0	0	148	83	65	3	0	19
Tonga A	4	2	0	2	96	115	-19	1	0	9
Gen Blue	4	2	0	2	77	91	-14	0	0	8
Samoa A	4	1	0	3	82	91	-9	1	2	7
ACT A	4	1	0	3	78	101	-23	0	1	5
Updated: 23 March 2014; Source: oceaniarugby.com Archived 2015-03-16 at the Wayback Machine

Competition rules
Points breakdown:
4 points for a win
2 points for a draw
1 bonus point for a loss by seven points or less
1 bonus point for scoring four or more tries in a match

Classification:
Teams standings are calculated as follows:
Most log points accumulated from all matches
Most log points accumulated in matches between tied teams
Highest difference between points scored for and against accumulated from all matches
Most points scored accumulated from all matches

== Pool matches ==
=== Round 1 ===
21 February 2014	Force A	29–23	Reds A	Aquinas College, Perth
5:00pm

23 February 2014	Gen Blue (NSW)	23–17	ACT A	Allianz Stadium, Sydney
1:40pm

Bye/s: Argentina, Fiji, Japan, Samoa, Tonga

=== Round 2 ===
28 February 2014	Gen Blue (NSW)	17–14	Samoa A	TG Millner Field, Sydney
4:00pm

1 March 2014	Force A	61–6	Junior Japan
4:40pm

2 March 2014	Reds A	22–19	Fiji Warriors	Ballymore Stadium, Brisbane
3:00pm

2 March 2014	ACT A	23–32	Pampas XV
4:00pm

Bye/s: Tonga

=== Round 3 ===
4 March 2014	Samoa A	27–18	Tonga A	TG Millner Field, Sydney
3:30pm

7 March 2014	Gen Blue (NSW)	16–31	Pampas XV	David Phillips Field, Sydney
3:00pm

7 March 2014	Reds A	81–7	Junior Japan	Suncorp Stadium, Brisbane
4:20pm

Bye/s: Fiji, ACT A, Western Force A

=== Round 4 ===
9 March 2014	ACT A	20–29	Tonga A	Royal Military College, Canberra
4:00pm

10 March 2014	Force A	24–36	Fiji Warriors	Ballymore Stadium, Brisbane
4:00pm

Bye/s: Argentina, Japan, Samoa, Gen Blue, Reds A

=== Round 5 ===
11 March 2014	Pampas XV	38–24	Samoa A	David Phillips Field, Sydney
4:00pm

13 March 2014	Gen Blue (NSW)	21–29	Tonga A	TG Millner Field, Sydney
4:00pm

Unofficial match	Queensland Under 20	40–26	Junior Japan	Ballymore Stadium, Brisbane

Unofficial match	NSW Under 20	24–49	Fiji Warriors

Bye/s: ACT A, Reds A, Western Force A

=== Round 6 ===
15 March 2014	ACT A	18–17	Samoa A	GIO Stadium, Canberra
5:10pm

18 March 2014	Junior Japan	13–99	Fiji Warriors	Bond University, Gold Coast
3:00pm

19 March 2014	Pampas XV	47–20	Tonga A	Royal Military College, Canberra
4:00pm

Bye/s: Gen Blue, Reds A, Western Force A

== Finals ==
=== 3rd place play-off ===
23 March 2014	Fiji Warriors	54–21	Tonga A	TG Millner Field, Sydney
13:00

=== Final ===
23 March 2014	Reds A	21–36	Pampas XV	TG Millner Field, Sydney
15:00
