= TG Millner Field =

Rugby stadium in Marsfield, New South wales

Coordinates: 33.777369°S 151.098064°E

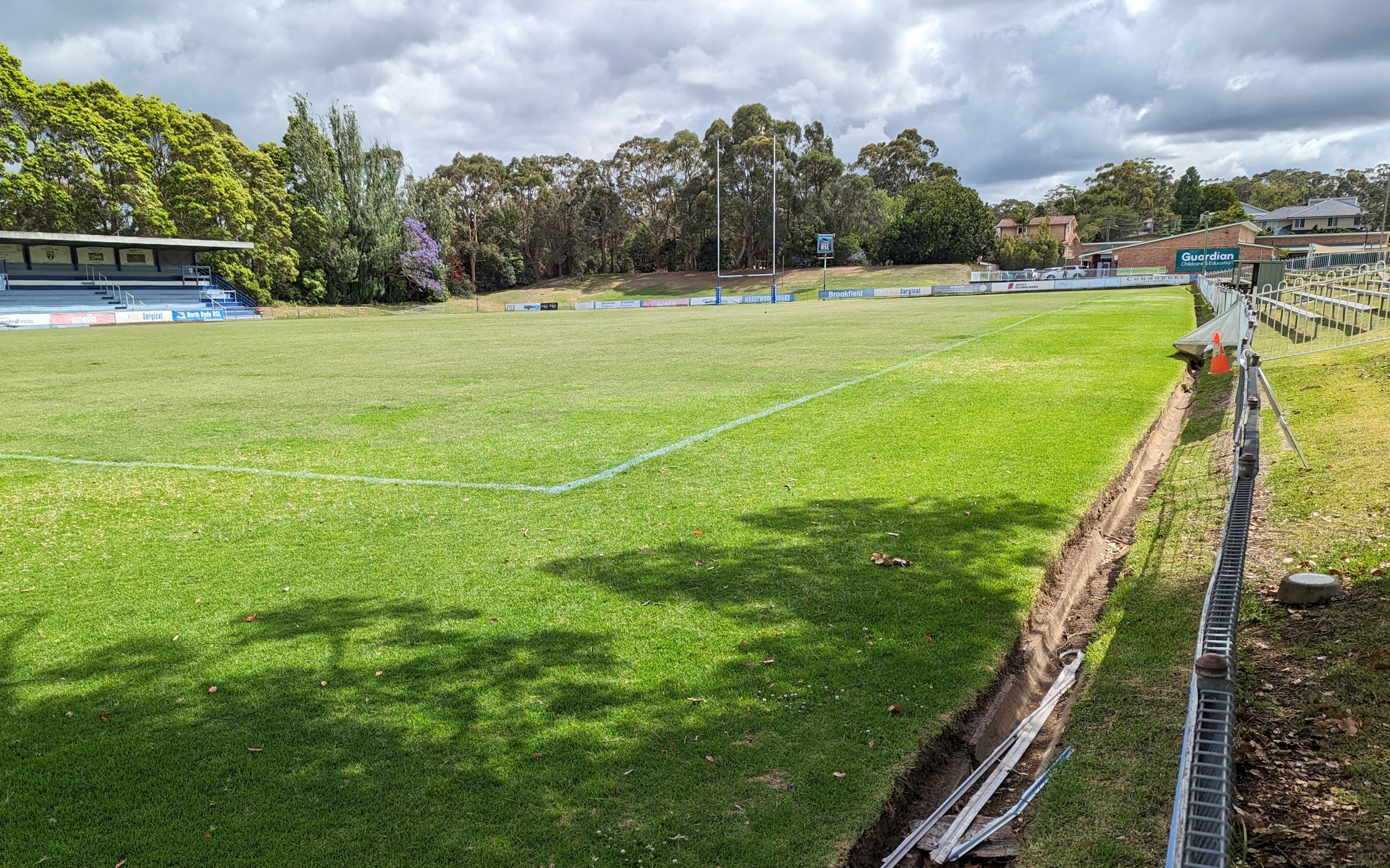
- Interactive map of TG Millner Field
- Location: Marsfield, New South Wales, Australia
- Country: Australia

TG Millner Field is in the Sydney suburb of Marsfield, Australia. It is currently the home ground of Eastwood Rugby Club however Eastwood Rugby has indicated that it will be relocating from TG Millner.

== History ==
The land where the main field is now (approximately 4 acres) was bought originally in 1951 by Colonel TG Millner and subsequently sold to Vimiera Recreation Grounds Ltd a company associated with Eastwood Rugby. The clubhouse and oval were built by volunteers and after 1963 and the development of dressing rooms, home games were played at Marsfield. Additional land was bought by Eastwood Rugby in 1967 increasing the site to more than 16 acres (65,000 m^{2}).

The complex originally had three full sized playing fields which have been floodlit since 1969 and which were available for games and training. The grandstand was also constructed in 1969.

During the 1990s the North Ryde Soccer Football Club played at the TG Millner Field for a number of years. Northern Districts Cricket also played at TG Millner for a season including at least one game with Allan Border playing.

=== Australian Rugby Development Centre ===
On Saturday, 17 August 2013, the Australian Rugby Union announced that TG Millner was to be purchased by the ARU and would be redeveloped to become the Australian Rugby Development Centre:

TG Millner Field will be transformed into a high performance sport centre and training facility for Australia’s national Rugby teams including the Qantas Wallabies and will act as the Olympic base for Australia’s Men’s and Women’s Sevens teams.

=== North Ryde RSL ===
In 2000 Vimiera Recreation Grounds, the owners of TG Millner, signed a 99-year lease with North Ryde RSL Community Club which transferred control over the entire complex to the RSL. Following this transfer a number of changes occurred.

In 2017, VRG advised that the entire complex had been sold unconditionally to North Ryde RSL.

On 25 August 2020 Ryde Council decided not to proceed with heritage listing of TG Millner Field.

=== Application to Develop the Site ===
In June 2022, North Ryde RSL the owners of TG Millner announced that an application had been lodged with Ryde Council to "renew the TG Millner Field site by creating 132 low-rise, diverse homes and a new public park for the local community."

On 7 December 2022, The Strategic Planning Panel of the North Sydney Planning Panel advised that "The Panel has determined that the planning proposal should not be submitted for a Gateway determination".

On 3 May 2023, the Government of New South Wales Planning Portal recorded that SEARS had been issued for a State Significant Development 146-150 Vimiera Rd, Marsfield - Seniors housing. "Relocation of the existing registered club to new premises within the site and construction of a residential aged care facility comprising approximately 670 beds."

Following the April 2024 State Government refusal of permission for Ryde Council to compulsorily acquire the site, North Ryde RSL announced its intention to now resubmit the Marsfield Common planning proposal for determination by the relevant consent authorities. In July 2024 North Ryde RSL advised its members that the Marsfield Common proposal had been re-submitted to Ryde Council .

On June 10, 2025 the Sydney North Planning Panel advised that it had approved the application to rezone the ground and that it "should be submitted for a Gateway determination because the Proposal has demonstrated strategic merit".

On December 4, 2025, the Gateway determination was approved.

On December 15, 2025 North Ryde RSL Community Club announced that "This week, the Club completed the sale of TG Millner Field..... to a purchaser associated with Winston Langley and the Abadeen Group".

=== Ryde Council Compulsory Acquisition ===
On 23 May 2023 Ryde Council resolved to compulsorily acquire the TG Millner Field.

On 28 November 2023 Ryde Council resolved that "Council advise the Minister for Planning of a funding allocation by City of Ryde Council of $15 million to the purchase of TG Millner".

On 12 April 2024 the Sydney Morning Herald reported; "Local government minister Ron Hoenig told the council he had refused permission [to acquire the site] because he was not convinced the council could afford to purchase the land."

=== Ryde Council LEP Re-Zoning ===
On 27 August 2024 by way of a Mayoral Minute, Ryde Council resolved "That Council develop and lodge a Planning Proposal to the NSW State Government for protection of critical public recreation space at TG Millner Field through an amendment to the Ryde Local Environmental Plan (RLEP) 2014 to classify the site as an RE1 – Public Recreation zone".

The State Planning Minister The Hon Paul Scully on November 28, 2024 advised Ryde Council that

"To be clear: these rezoning documents did not and do not contain any commitment, or requirement, from the NSW Government to either acquire or preserve TG Millner Fields as open space"

and

"the Department will not support a planning proposal to rezone the site were it to be submitted by Council. This position remains unaltered.

It is misleading to residents and ratepayers for you to suggest that these documents indicate otherwise."
