= Patricio Fernández =

Argentine rugby union player

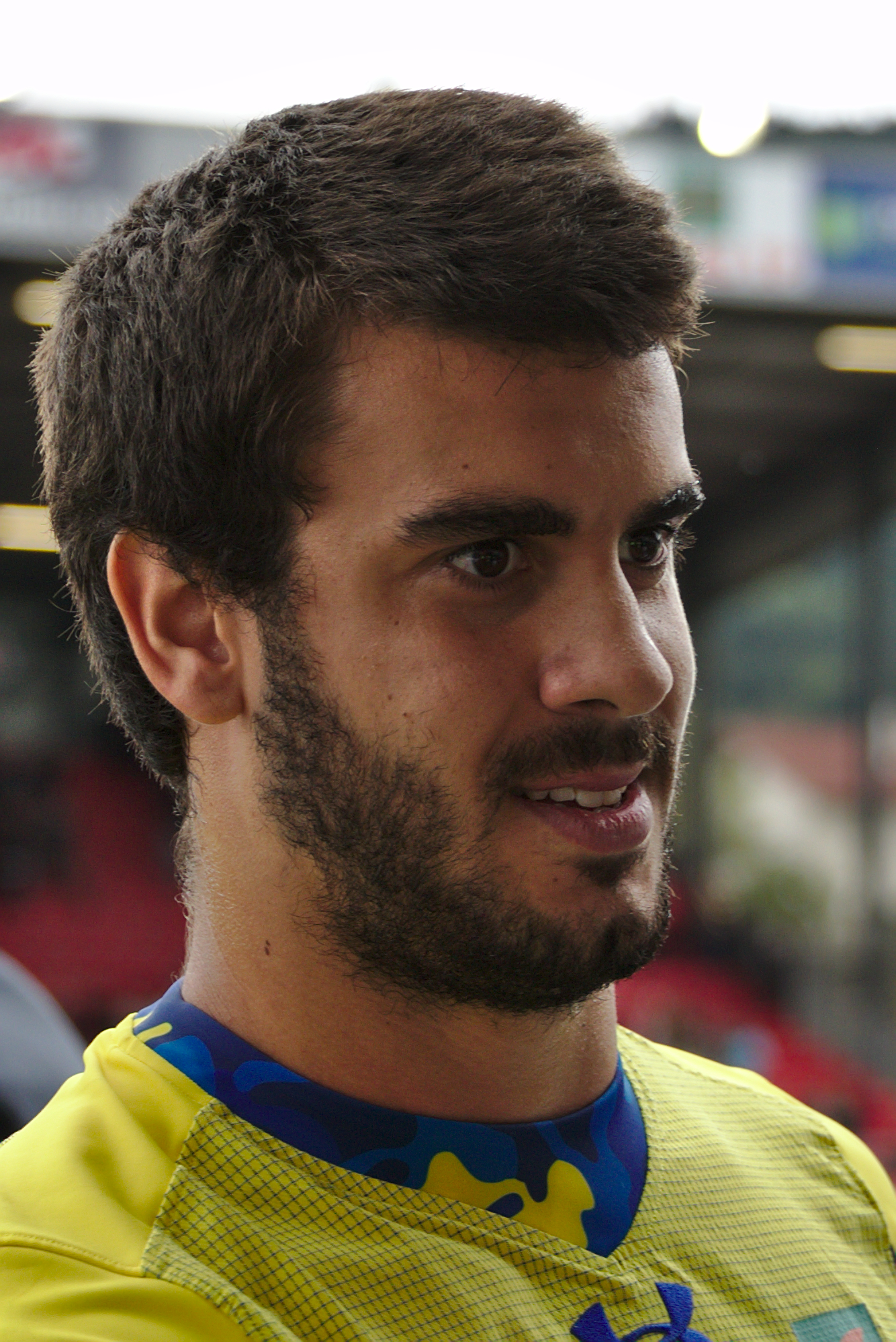
- Born: 10 November 1994 (age 32) Argentina
- Height: 190 cm (6 ft 3 in)
- Weight: 92 kg (203 lb; 14 st 7 lb)

Rugby union career
- Position: Fly-half
- Current team: Perpignan
Senior career
Years	Team	Apps	(Points)
2016–2019	Clermont	64	(246)
2019–2020	Lyon	13	(50)
2020–	Perpignan	7	(11)
- Correct as of 17 May 2021
International career
Years	Team	Apps	(Points)
2013–2014	Argentina U20	10	(155)
2021–	Argentina		
- Correct as of 17 May 2021
National sevens team
Years	Team		Comps
2014–2015	Argentina Sevens		2
- Correct as of 17 May 2021

Patricio Fernández (born 10 November 1994 in Argentina) is an Argentine rugby union player who plays for Perpignan in the Rugby Pro D2. His playing position is fly-half. He joined Perpignan in January 2021, having previously represented Clermont and Lyon. He previously represented Argentina Sevens and Argentina U20. His performances in France saw him named in the Argentina squad for the 2021 internationals.
