= Samoa A national rugby union team =

Samoa A
- Union: Samoa Rugby Union
- Emblem: the Southern Cross
Team kit

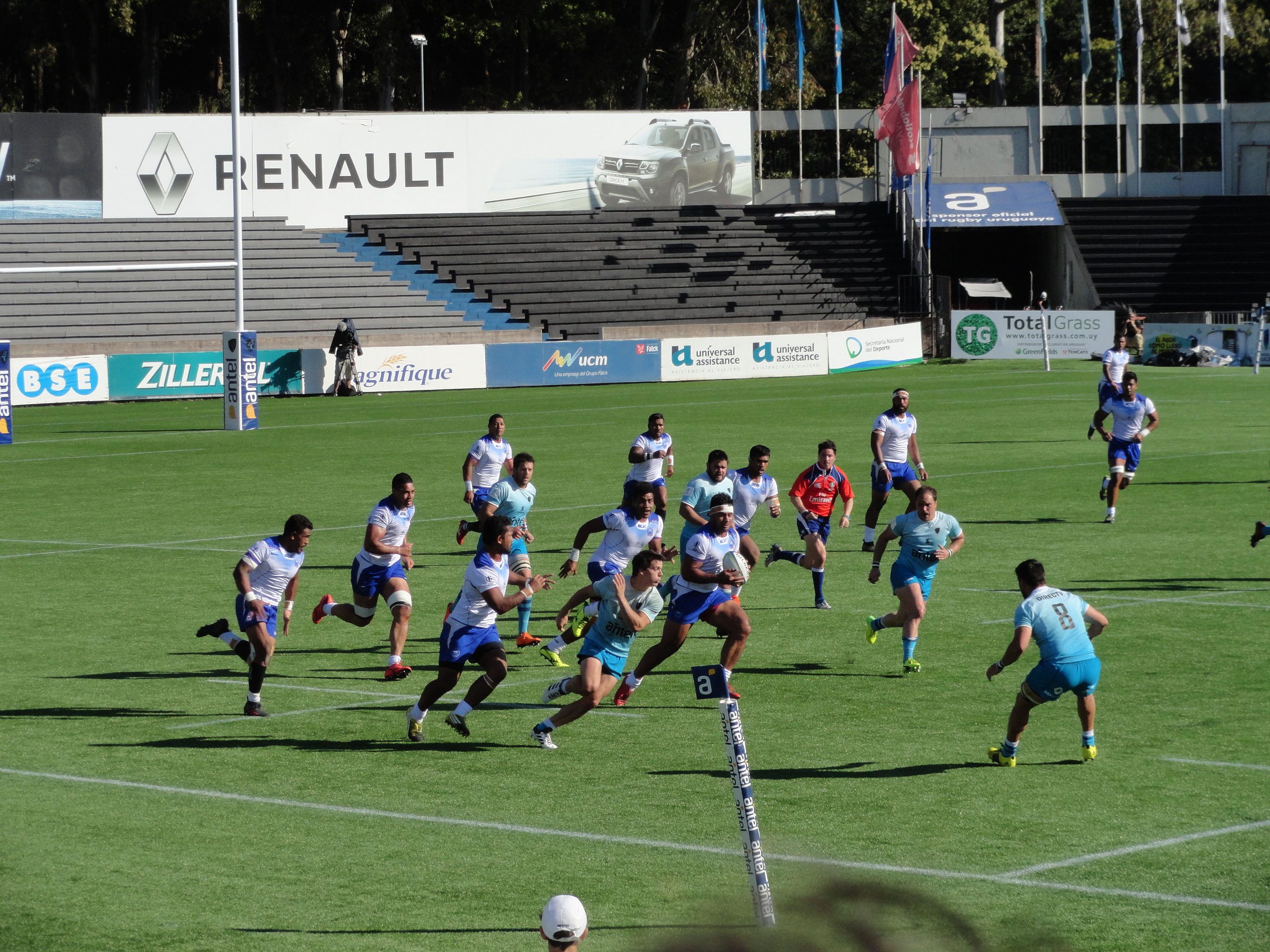
Samoa A playing Uruguay XV at the 2018 Americas Pacific Challenge in Montevideo.

Samoa A is a national representative rugby union team of the Samoan rugby union. It is the second-tier side to the Samoa national rugby union team. Samoa A competes in the Pacific Challenge, formerly known as the Pacific Rugby Cup, against teams including Tonga A and Fiji Warriors. Since 2016, the team has also competed in the Americas Pacific Challenge.

Between 2006 and 2010, Samoa was represented by two teams at the Pacific Rugby Cup; Upolu Samoa and Savaii Samoa. The two teams were replaced in 2011 by Samoa A which is now the sole Samoan representative in the Pacific Challenge. The tournament is now mainly contested by national 'A' teams.

== International results ==
Matches against national teams or national 'A" teams up to and including 2014 Pacific Rugby Cup:

22-03-2011	Samoa A	12–23	Fiji Warriors	Churchill Park, Lautoka
26-03-2011	Tonga A	15–13	Samoa A	Lawaqa Park, Sigatoka
11-10-2012	Samoa A	18–20	Tonga A	Teufaiva Stadium, Nuku'alofa
15-10-2012	Fiji Warriors	42–34	Samoa A	Teufaiva Stadium, Nuku'alofa
04-03-2014	Samoa A	27–18	Tonga A	TG Milner Field, Sydney
11-03-2014	Pampas XV	38–24	Samoa A	David Phillips Field, Sydney

== Record ==
=== Honours ===
Pacific Rugby Cup

- Runner-up: 2011, 2012, 2013.

Americas Pacific Challenge

- Winner: 2018.

=== Season standings ===
Pacific Challenge (formerly Pacific Rugby Cup)

Year	Pos	Pld	W	D	L	F	A	+/-	TB	LB	Pts	Final	Notes
2018	3rd	3	1	0	2	82	72	+10	—	—	5	—	
2017	4th	3	0	0	3	78	112	-34	0	1	1	—	
2016	2nd	3	2	0	1	98	56	+42	2	0	10	—	
2015	2nd	3	2	0	1	69	87	-18	1	0	3	—	Finished 2nd in Pool A
2014	4th	4	1	0	3	82	91	-9	1	2	7	—	Finished 4th in Pool B
2013	2nd	6	2	0	4	134	198	-64	1	1	10	—	Runner-up on league table (no final)
2012	2nd	8	3	0	5	191	238	-47	0	1	13	—	Runner-up on league table (no final)
2011	2nd	8	3	0	5	135	171	-36	1	2	15	—	Runner-up on league table (no final)

Americas Pacific Challenge

Year	Pos	Pld	W	D	L	F	A	+/-	TB	LB	Pts	Final	Notes
2018	1st	3	3	0	0	97	72	+25	2	0	14	—	First on league table (no final)
2017	4th	3	1	0	2	90	142	-52	2	1	7	—	Fourth on league table (no final)
2016	3rd	3	2	0	1	97	103	-6	1	0	9	—	Third on league table (no final)
