= Junior Japan =

Rugby union team

- Union: Japan Rugby Football Union
- Emblem: Sakura
- Founded: 2012
- Coach: (Japan) Naoya Okubo
- Captain: Keito Aoki
1st kit	2nd kit

Junior Japan is a national representative rugby union team of the Japan rugby union. It is a second-tier side to the Japan national rugby union team. Junior Japan competes in the World Rugby Pacific Challenge against teams such as Samoa A, Fiji Warriors, and Argentina's Pampas XV.

The Junior Japan squad was formed in 2012 from players just outside the main Japanese national squad. In the first year, the team played a match in Tokyo against the Tongan national side, before joining the Pacific Rugby Cup in 2013.

== Current Squad ==
Naoya Okubu named a 33 man squad for the World Rugby Pacific Challenge 2024.

Player	Position	Club/Province
Jinnosuke Mori	Loose-head Prop	(Japan) Tenri University
Mutsuki Urade	Loose-head Prop	(Japan) Kindai University
Kenji Sato	Hooker	(Japan) Waseda University
Haruya Kerakawauchi	Hooker	(Japan) Teikyo University
Kenshin Shimizu	Hooker	(Japan) Waseda University
Towa Nunobiki	Tight-head Prop	(Japan) Teikyo University
Yuta Hatta	Tight-head Prop	(Japan) Kyoto Sangyo University
Takumi Yamaguchi	Tight-head Prop	(Japan) Meiji University
Chuka Ishibashi	Lock	(Japan) Kyoto Sangyo University
Shuntaro Isobe	Lock	(Japan) Kyoto Sangyo University
Yotaro Monobe	Locks	(Japan) Meiji University
Tomonosuke Shiromaru	Lock	(Japan) Tsukuba University
Keito Aoki	Lock	(Japan) Teikyo University
Koki Kawagoe	Back row	(Japan) Tenri University
Yoshiaki Taian	Back row	(Japan) Tenri University
Shusui Kamei	Back row	(Japan) Meiji University
Kotaro Okawa	Back row	(Japan) Meiji University
Asahi Doei	Scrum-half	(Japan) Kyoto Sangyo University
Joji Takagi	Scrum-half	(Japan) Kyoto Sangyo University
Rieto Ito	Scrum-half	(Japan) Meiji University
Takaya Motohashi	Fly-half	(Japan) Teikyo University
Ryunosuke Ito	Fly-half	(Japan) Meiji University
Yuta Akihama	Centre	(Japan) Meiji University
Yamato Ueda	Centre	(Japan) Teikyo University
Kohaku Ebisawa	Winger	(Japan) Meiji University
Yoshitaka Yazaki	Winger	(Japan) Waseda University
Jingo Takenoshita	Utility back	(Japan) Meiji University
Tasuku Masuyama	Utility back	(Japan) Tsukuba University
Aoi Omiya	Reserve	(Japan) Nihon University
Ryoku Masuo	Reserve	Unattached
Syota Goto	Reserve	(Japan) Nihon University
Yusuke Yoshida	Reserve	(Japan) Teikyo University

== Record ==
=== Season standings ===
Pacific Rugby Cup

Year	Pos	Pld	W	D	L	F	A	+/-	TB	LB	Pts	Final	Notes
2013	3rd	6	0	0	6	140	361	-221	3	0	3	–	
2014	4th	3	0	0	3	26	241	-210	0	0	0	–	Finished 4th in Pool A

==== World Rugby Pacific Challenge ====
Year	Pos	Pld	W	D	L	F	A	+/-	TB	LB	Pts	Final	Notes
2015	6th	3	0	0	3	41	212	-171	1	0	1	–	Finished 3rd in Pool A
2016	3rd	3	1	0	2	58	94	-36	0	0	4	–	Lost to Tonga A in the 3rd place play off.
2017	2nd	3	2	0	1	92	103	-11	2	0	10	–	
2018	2nd	3	2	0	1	77	77	0	2	0	10	–	
2019	2nd	3	2	0	1	94	97	-3	3	0	11	–	
2020	1st	3	3	0	0	143	25	+118	2	0	14	–	
2023	3rd	3	1	0	2	100	133	33	2	0	6	–	
