= Canada A national rugby union team =

Canada A
- Union: Rugby Canada
- Emblem(s): the Maple leaf
- Ground(s): Westhills Stadium
Team kit	2nd kit

Canada A is a national representative rugby union team of Rugby Canada. Previously called Canada Selects, the team is the second-tier side to the Canada national rugby union team. Canada A competes in tournaments such as the Americas Rugby Championship and World Rugby Pacific Challenge against other national 'A' teams.

== History ==
The team first played at Markham, Ontario against the touring Scotland national team in June 2002.

== Results ==
Matches against national teams or national 'A' teams:

08-06-2002	Scotland	33–8	Canada XV	Markham, ON
30-07-2003	New Zealand Māori	52–11	Canada A	Markham, ON
11-08-2008	Portugal	18–34	Canada XV	Markham, ON
21-10-2009	Argentina XV	40–16	Canada Selects^{*}	Chatham-Kent, ON
10-10-2010	Tonga A	16–32	Canada Selects	Córdoba, Argentina
05-10-2010	Canada Selects	14–49	Argentina XV	Córdoba, Argentina
15-10-2010	USA Select XV	6–17	Canada Selects	Córdoba, Argentina
12-10-2012	Uruguay	10–28	Canada A	Langford, BC
16-10-2012	USA Selects	3–23	Canada A	Langford, BC
19-10-2012	Argentina XV	28–9	Canada A	Langford, BC
20-10-2013	Canada A	17–10	Uruguay	Langford, BC
15-10-2013	Canada A	10–30	USA Selects	Langford, BC
19-10-2013	Canada A	14–23	Argentina XV	Langford, BC
11-10-2014	Canada A	20–6	Uruguay	Langford, BC
15-10-2014	Canada A	3–16	USA Selects	Langford, BC
19-10-2014	Canada A	9–39	Argentina XV	Langford, BC
10-03-2015	Junior Japan	17–69	Canada A	Suva, Fiji
14-03-2015	Samoa A	19–17	Canada A	Suva, Fiji
18-03-2015	Pampas XV	36–15	Canada A	Suva, Fiji
23-03-2015	Samoa A	26–28	Canada A	Suva, Fiji
08-10-2016	Argentina XV	56-29	Canada A	Montevideo, Uruguay
12-10-2016	USA Selects	47-37	Canada A	Montevideo, Uruguay
16-10-2016	Samoa A	27-22	Canada A	Montevideo, Uruguay
07-10-2017	Argentina XV	71-17	Canada A	Montevideo, Uruguay
11-10-2017	Tonga A	31-15	Canada A	Montevideo, Uruguay
15-10-2017	USA Selects	45-26	Canada A	Montevideo, Uruguay
06-10-2018	Uruguay A	35-21	Canada A	Montevideo, Uruguay
10-10-2018	Argentina XV	45-5	Canada A	Montevideo, Uruguay
14-10-2018	Tonga A	31-32	Canada A	Montevideo, Uruguay
21-10-2022	Chile XV	36-25	Canada A	Mogi das Cruzes, Brazil
26-10-2022	Brazil XV	14-31	Canada A	Mogi das Cruzes, Brazil

Notes:

^* Exhibition match (no cap)

== Current squad ==
On 7 October 2022, a 32-man squad was named ahead of the 2022 World Rugby Americas Rugby Trophy.

Head Coach: (Wales) Kingsley Jones

Note: Flags indicate national union for the club/province as defined by World Rugby.

Player	Position	Date of birth (age)	Caps	Club/province
Foster Dewitt	Hooker	25 May 1996 (age 28)	1	(United States) New England Free Jacks
Andrew Quattrin	Hooker	29 August 1996 (age 28)	14	(United States) New England Free Jacks
Lindsey Stevens	Hooker	27 August 1995 (age 29)	2	(United States) LA Giltinis
Cole Keith	Prop	9 May 1997 (age 27)	25	(United States) New England Free Jacks
Liam Murray	Prop	17 October 1997 (age 27)	3	(United States) Dallas Jackals
Emerson Prior	Prop	4 June 1998 (age 26)	0	(United States) Utah Warriors
Tyler Rowland	Prop	16 October 1999 (age 25)	7	(Canada) Toronto Arrows
Kyle Steeves	Prop	31 January 2000 (age 25)	0	(Canada) Pacific Pride
Conor Young	Prop	15 August 1995 (age 29)	0	(United States) New England Free Jacks
Kyle Baillie	Lock	7 April 1991 (age 33)	34	(Canada) Toronto Arrows
Izzak Kelly	Lock		0	(Canada) UBC Thunderbirds
Conor Keys	Lock	9 July 1996 (age 28)	28	(United States) New England Free Jacks
Josh Larsen	Lock	4 April 1994 (age 30)	19	(United States) New England Free Jacks
Callum Botchar	Back row	3 October 1997 (age 27)	0	(Canada) Pacific Pride
Matthew Klimchuk	Back row	30 April 2002 (age 22)	0	(Canada) Pacific Pride
Lucas Rumball	Back row	2 August 1995 (age 29)	22	(Canada) Toronto Arrows
Owain Ruttan	Back row	25 June 1998 (age 26)	0	(Canada) Toronto Arrows
Corey Thomas	Back row	21 September 1994 (age 30)	8	(United States) LA Giltinis
Siaki Vikilani	Back row	7 August 2000 (age 24)	7	(Canada) Toronto Arrows
Ross Braude	Scrum-half	18 January 2000 (age 25)	10	(Canada) Toronto Arrows
Jason Higgins	Scrum-half	28 March 1995 (age 29)	7	(United States) San Diego Legion
Gradyn Bowd	Fly-half	27 August 1992 (age 32)	8	(United States) Old Glory DC
Cooper Coats	Fly-half	6 October 1996 (age 28)	7	Canada 7s
Ben LeSage	Centre	24 November 1995 (age 29)	25	(United States) LA Giltinis
Takoda McMullin	Centre	5 January 2002 (age 23)	0	(Canada) UBC Thunderbirds
Talon McMullin	Centre	5 January 2002 (age 23)	0	(Canada) UBC Thunderbirds
Josh Thiel	Centre	2 June 1997 (age 27)	1	(United States) San Diego Legion
D'Shawn Bowen	Wing	12 September 1996 (age 28)	0	Canada 7s
Josiah Morra	Wing	7 February 1998 (age 27)	0	Canada 7s
David Richard	Wing	12 May 2000 (age 24)	1	Canada 7s
Alex Russell	Wing	22 June 1996 (age 28)	0	Canada 7s
Gabe Casey	Fullback	15 July 1999 (age 25)	0	(Canada) UVic Vikes
Robbie Povey	Fullback	21 September 1996 (age 28)	11	(United States) Houston SaberCats
