= HFC Bank Stadium =

Multi-purpose stadium in Suva, Fiji

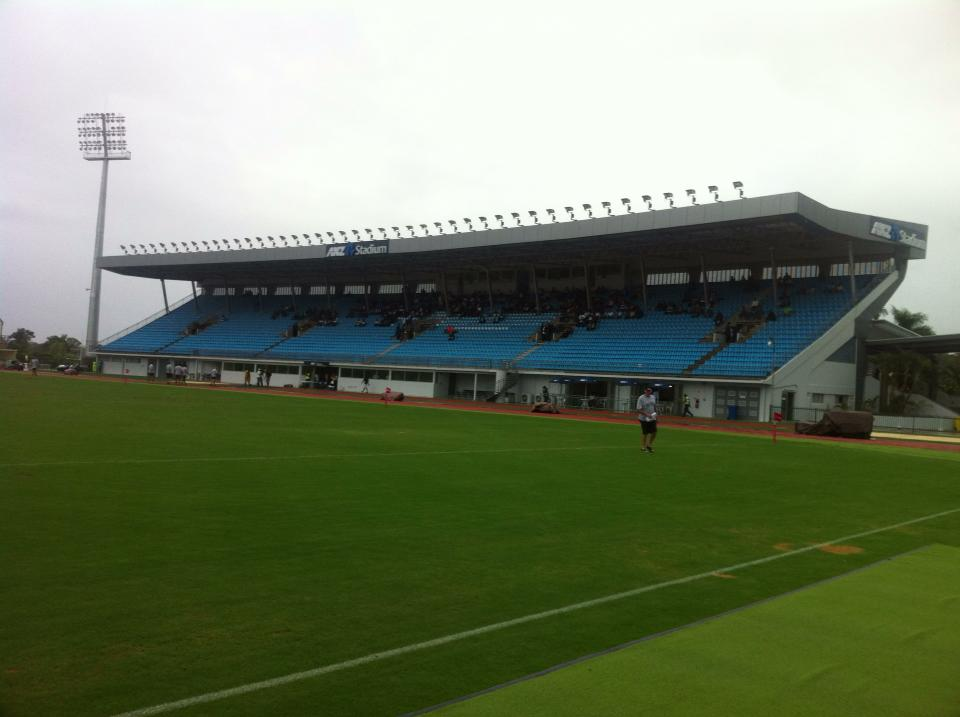
- Interactive map of HFC Bank Stadium
- Full name: HFC Bank Stadium
- Former names: ANZ Stadium (2013–2022)
- Location: Suva, Fiji
- Coordinates: 18°9′0″S 178°26′57″E
- Owner: Government of Suva City
- Operator: Government of Suva City
- Capacity: 15,446
- Surface: Grass

Construction
- Built: 1951; 75 years ago
- Renovated: 1977–1978; 2011–2012

Tenants
- Suva Highlanders; Fijian Drua; Suva FC; Fiji national football team Bula FC (OFCPL) (occasional matches) (2026–present)

The HFC Bank Stadium (formerly known as ANZ Stadium) is a multi-purpose stadium in Suva, Fiji.

HFC Stadium is used primarily for rugby league, rugby union and football matches, and features a track as well as a pitch suitable for worldwide competition. The stadium has a capacity of 15,446, with 4,026 seats on grandstand and 420 in VIP boxes.

== Construction and renovations ==
Originally called Buckhurst Park, the stadium was constructed in 1951 on sixteen hectares of land given by William H. B. Buckhurst in 1948.

The stadium was first renovated in 1978–1979 for the Sixth South Pacific Games. Work commenced in April 1978 with the demolition of the grandstand, which had lost its roof during Hurricane Bebe. The stadium was renamed National Stadium upon reopening in 1979.

A second renovation took place in 2012, sponsored by ANZ Fiji, Fiji's largest bank, at a cost of FJD $17.5 million. The stadium reopened in March 2013, with a rugby union game between the Fiji national team and Classic All Blacks.

In June 2022, the Fiji Sports Council announced HFC Bank as the new naming right sponsor of the stadium with the new name designated as HFC Bank Stadium.

HFC Bank Stadium in which hosted the 2024 Oceania Athletics Championships, Oceania Para Athletics Championships and the Oceania Masters Athletics Championships had its track surface re-laid with a new surface early in 2024, specifically for the championships. The stadium currently holds World Athletics Class 2 Certification until February 2029. The facility held the Oceania Invitational and the Oceania Athletics Championships (including Para, Masters, U20, U18, and U16) from the 1st to the 8th of June 2024.

The stadium also hosted the 2024 OFC Peace Cup in June 2024.

== Buckhurst and Bidesi Parks ==
The 2012–2013 renovation also included the park and playing grounds behind the HFC Bank Stadium, which are known as Bidesi Park and Buckhurst Park, retaining the stadium's original name. The Buckhurst and Bidesi grounds include three pitches primarily used for training and competition in rugby league, rugby union, football, and cricket, and a small stadium and synthetic training track. Buckhurst Park was the site of the National Baseball Diamond used in the 2003 South Pacific Games.

== See also ==
- List of rugby league stadiums by capacity
- List of rugby union stadiums by capacity
