= Tonga A national rugby union team =

Tonga A
- Union: Tonga Rugby Football Union
- Nickname: ʻIkale Tahi
- Emblem: The White Dove
- Ground(s): Lawaqa Park, Sigatoka
Team kit

Tonga A is a national representative rugby union team of the Tongan rugby union. It is the second-tier side to the Tonga national rugby union team. Tonga A competes in the Pacific Challenge, formerly known as the Pacific Rugby Cup, against teams including Samoa A and Fiji Warriors. Since 2017, the team has also competed in the Americas Pacific Challenge.

Between 2006 and 2010, Tonga was represented by two teams at the Pacific Rugby Cup; Tau'uta Reds and Tautahi Gold.

In 2010, Tonga A played three matches against other national A teams as an invited side to the Americas Rugby Championship. Earlier in that year Tonga A also played two matches against Fiji Warriors in the first Punjas Series. The Tongans had one win and one loss but lost the series on aggregate scores. This result was repeated in the second (and concluding) Punjas Series in 2011.

The Pacific Rugby Cup was reorganised in 2011, and has since been mainly contested by national 'A' teams. The Tonga A side became the sole Tongan representative in the PRC from then on.

== International matches ==
Matches against national teams or national 'A" teams up to and including 2014 Pacific Rugby Cup:

16-04-2010	(PS)	Fiji Warriors	12–27	Tonga A	National Stadium, Suva
23-04-2010	(PS)	Fiji Warriors	21–3	Tonga A	Churchill Park, Lautoka
05-10-2010	(ARC)	Tonga A	6–17	USA Select XV	Estadio Olímpico Chateau Carreras
10-10-2010	(ARC)	Tonga A	16–32	Canada Selects	Estadio Olímpico Chateau Carreras
15-10-2010	(ARC)	Argentina XV	28–10	Tonga A	Estadio Olímpico Chateau Carreras
19-03-2011	(PRC)	Fiji Warriors	21–14	Tonga A	Churchill Park, Lautoka
22-03-2011	(PRC)	Samoa A	12–23	Fiji Warriors	Churchill Park, Lautoka
13-08-2011	(PS)	Fiji Warriors	27–12	Tonga A	Churchill Park, Lautoka
19-08-2011	(PS)	Fiji Warriors	30–32	Tonga A	Churchill Park, Lautoka
11-10-2012	(PRC)	Samoa A	18–20	Tonga A	Teufaiva Stadium, Nuku'alofa
19-10-2012	(PRC)	Tonga A	16–25	Fiji Warriors	Teufaiva Stadium, Nuku'alofa
04-03-2014	(PRC)	Samoa A	27–18	Tonga A	TG Milner Field, Sydney
19-03-2014	(PRC)	Pampas XV	47–20	Tonga A	Royal Military College, Canberra

== Record ==
=== Season standings ===
Pacific Challenge (formerly Pacific Rugby Cup)

Year	Pos	Pld	W	D	L	F	A	+/-	TB	LB	Pts	Final	Notes
2018	[icon]												
2017	[icon]												
2016	[icon]												
2015	[icon]												
2014	4th	4	2	0	2	96	115	-19	1	0	9	21–54	Lost 3rd place play-off to Fiji Warriors
2013	4th	6	0	0	6	73	306	-233	0	0	0	—	
2012	3rd	8	1	1	6	72	253	-181	0	0	6	—	
2011	3rd	8	2	1	5	133	233	-100	0	1	11	—	

Americas Pacific Challenge

Year	Pos	Pld	W	D	L	F	A	+/-	TB	LB	Pts	Final	Notes
2018												—	
2017	3rd	3	2	0	1	87	77	+10	3	0	11	—	Third on league table (no final)
