= List of Seattle Seawolves seasons =

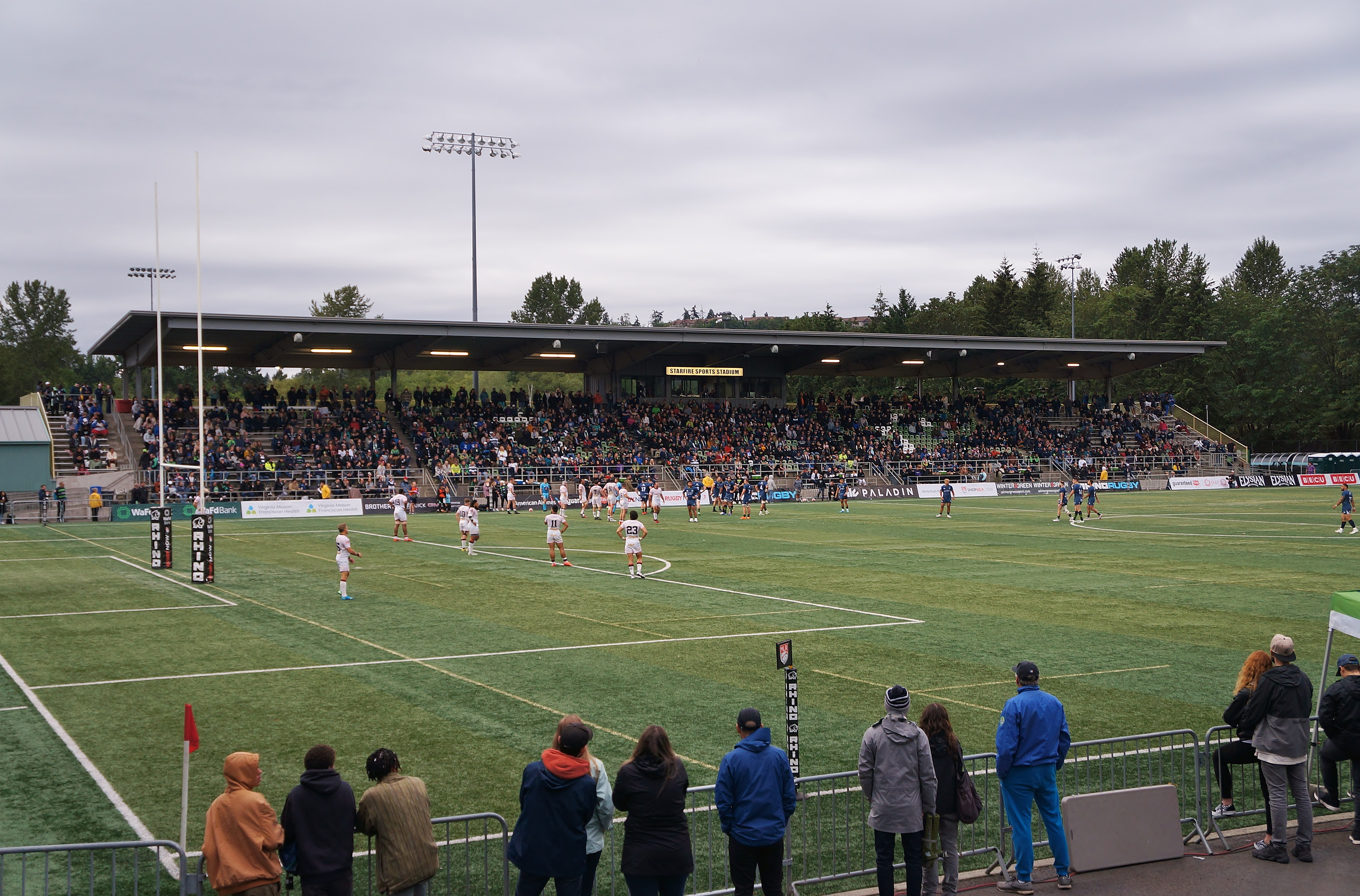
A 2022 playoffs game between the Seattle Seawolves and San Diego Legion at Starfire Sports in Tukwila, Washington

The Seattle Seawolves are a professional American rugby union team based in Seattle, Washington, that play in Major League Rugby (MLR). They were established in 2017 as one of the seven inaugural teams in MLR and began play in the 2018 season. The Seawolves are a member of the Western Conference and play their home matches at Starfire Sports, a 4,500-seat multipurpose stadium in Tukwila, Washington.

As of the 2026 season, MLR has six teams that play a regular season with 10 matches from March to June. The regular season consists of a full round-robin schedule with the top four teams advancing to the postseason playoffs, a single-elimination tournament in June that culminates in the championship final. The league previously had 12 teams that were divided into conferences and played a more limited intra-conference schedule.

The Seawolves have won two MLR championships, tied for the most in league history with the New England Free Jacks, and have appeared in four finals. The team have qualified for the playoffs in all but one of their full seasons in MLR. They won the inaugural championship in 2018 under player-coach Phil Mack and the 2019 final under Richie Walker, an interim replacement for head coach. The team missed the playoffs in the 2021 season, which they played under three coaches, and did not initially qualify for the 2022 playoffs until the disqualification of the Western Conference leaders, the Austin Gilgronis and LA Giltinis. The Seawolves qualified in a replacement berth under head coach Allen Clarke and finished as runners-up in the 2022 final, where they lost to Rugby New York. The team finished as runners-up in the 2024 final to the New England Free Jacks, who won their second consecutive championship.

As of the 2026 season, the Seawolves have played 119 total regular season games with a record of 68 wins, 2 draws, and 49 losses.

== Seasons ==
Key to colors

‡	League champions
†	Conference champions
§	Other

Seattle Seawolves record by season
Season	Conference (Note: Major League Rugby divided its league into two conferences beginning in the 2020 season. The league eliminated conferences in the 2026 season after it downsized to 6 teams.)	Regular season										Postseason results	Head coach	Refs.
Season	Conference	Pos.	Pld.	W	D	L	PF	PA	PD	BP	Pts. (Note: In rugby union, 4 points are awarded for a win, 2 points for a draw, 0 points for a loss, and bonus points for close losses and scoring at least 4 tries.)	Postseason results	Head coach	Refs.
2018	—	2nd	8	6	0	2	232	188	+44	5	29	Won Semifinal (San Diego) 38–24; Won MLR Final (Glendale) 23–19^{‡}	(Canada) Phil Mack (CAN)	
2019	—	2nd	16	11	1	4	498	405	+93	12	58	Won Semifinal (Toronto) 30–17; Won MLR Final (San Diego) 26–23^{‡}	(New Zealand) Richie Walker (NZL)	
2020 (Note: The 2020 season was postponed on March 12 after the fifth round of the regular season. The remainder of the season, including the playoffs, was canceled on March 19.)	Western	4th	5	1	0	4	138	162	−24	4	8	Not held	(Namibia) Kees Lensing (NAM)	
2021	Western	5th	16	4	0	12	343	461	−118	10	26	Did not qualify	(Namibia) Kees Lensing (NAM) (United States) Pate Tuilevuka (USA) (Ireland) Allen Clarke (IRE)	
2022	Western	4th (Note: The two highest-ranked Western Conference teams, Austin Gilgronis and the LA Giltinis, were disqualified from postseason play due to a breach of salary cap rules. As a result, Seattle were moved to second place and hosted the Western Conference Eliminator.)	16	9	0	7	435	354	+81	10	46	Won Conference Eliminator (San Diego) 43–19; Won Conference Final (Houston) 46–27; Lost MLR Final (New York) 15–30^{†}	(Ireland) Allen Clarke (IRE)	
2023	Western	2nd	16	12	0	4	509	348	+161	11	59	Won Conference Eliminator (Houston) 37–26; Lost Conference Final (San Diego) 32–10^{§}	(Ireland) Allen Clarke (IRE)	
2024	Western	2nd	16	11	0	5	498	373	+125	13	57	Won Conference Semifinals (San Diego) 30–28; Won Conference Final (Dallas) 28–25; Lost MLR Final (New England) 11–20^{†}	(Ireland) Allen Clarke (IRE)	
2025	Western	4th	16	8	1	7	460	422	+38	15	49	Lost Conference Semifinals (Utah) 21–27^{§}	(Ireland) Allen Clarke (IRE)	
2026	—	2nd	10	6	0	4	311	308	+3	7	31	Lost Conference Semifinals (California) 34–43^{§}	(Ireland) Allen Clarke (IRE)	
Total (as of 2026)			119	68	2	49	3,424	3,021	+403	87	363			
