= Kaleb Geiger =

US international rugby union player (born 1996)

- Born: May 4, 1996 (age 30) Colorado, United States
- Height: 6 ft 1 in (185 cm)
- Weight: 250 lb (113 kg)
- School: Castle View High School
- University: Concordia University

Rugby union career
- Position: Hooker / Prop
Senior career
Years	Team	Apps	(Points)
2022–23	Rugby New York	22	(10)
2023-	New England Free Jacks	31	(5)
International career
Years	Team	Apps	(Points)
2023–	United States	2	(0)

Kaleb Geiger (born May 4, 1996) is an American international rugby union player. He also plays in Major League Rugby.

== Early life/career ==
Kaleb was born to Kurt and Heidi Geiger. He has two brothers.

Geiger is a native of Sedalia, Colorado and was educated at Castle View High School.

A convert to rugby, Geiger had played varsity baseball (first base), football (defensive lineman) and wrestling for Concordia University. He didn't pick up rugby until after college, when at age 24 he was recruited by the American Raptors.

== Pro career ==
Geiger, mainly a prop and hooker, had two seasons in Major League Rugby with New York-based team Ironworkers, in 2022 and 2023. During this time he would make 22 appearances winning the 2022 MLR championship. He made his international debut for the United States in 2023, gaining his first cap against Portugal.

Geiger would sign with the free jacks. Making his debut during the 2024 season. Geiger would be a key piece in helping the free jacks win the 2024 and 2025 MLR championship. This would mark Geiger's 2nd and 3rd championship of his career.

== Honours ==
New England Free Jacks

- Major League Rugby Championship: (2024, 2025)

Ruby New York

- Major League Rugby Championship: (2022)

== Personal life ==
Geiger is married to his wife Dalaney in 2025 they had their first child together a son named Hank.

== See also ==
- List of United States national rugby union players
