= Antonio Kiri Kiri =

New Zealand rugby union player

- Born: Antonio Ihaka Kiri Kiri; 17 December 1991 (age 34) Wanganui, New Zealand
- Height: 187 cm (6 ft 2 in)
- Weight: 105 kg (16 st 7 lb; 231 lb)
- School: Palmerston North Boys' High School

Rugby union career
- Position: Flanker
- Current team: Rugby New York
Senior career
Years	Team	Apps	(Points)
2018–2019	Yorkshire Carnegie		
2019–2022	Cornish Pirates		
2018–2022	Rugby New York		
Provincial / State sides
Years	Team	Apps	(Points)
2012–	Manawatu	62	(55)
Super Rugby
Years	Team	Apps	(Points)
2018–	Blues	3	(0)
International career
Years	Team	Apps	(Points)
	All Black Sevens	4	

Antonio Ihaka Kiri Kiri (born 17 December 1991) is a New Zealand rugby union player who currently plays as a flanker for Rugby New York in Major League Rugby

== Career ==
Kiri Kiri previously played for the Blues in Super Rugby, along with spells at Yorkshire Carnegie and Cornish Pirates in the English Championship. He left Cornish Pirates on the 22 April 2022 to join Rugby New York.

He started the 2022 Major League Rugby final which saw Rugby New York win their first MLR championship
