= 2022 Major League Rugby final =

Championship rugby match

2022 Major League Rugby Championship Final
- Event: 2022 Major League Rugby season
Rugby New York (Eastern Conference)	Seattle Seawolves (Western Conference)
30	15
- Match details
- Date: June 25, 2022
- Venue: Red Bull Arena, Harrison
- Man of the Match: Andy Ellis (Rugby New York)
- Referee: Federico Anselmi (Argentina)
- Attendance: 1,979
- Weather: Overcast day 69.8 °F (21.0 °C); 68% humidity

The 2022 Major League Rugby final was the fourth Major League Rugby (MLR) championship match, held at the conclusion of the 5th season of the rugby union club competition in North America. The match was played on June 25, 2022, at the Red Bull Arena in Harrison, New Jersey. It was the first MLR Final to be held in New Jersey as all previous MLR Finals were played in California. Rugby New York emerged victorious over the Seattle Seawolves by a score of 30-15.

== Background ==
2022 Regular Season Final Standings
Western Conference
Pos	Team	W	D	L	PD	BP	Pts
1	Austin Gilgronis (D)	12	0	4	+246	10	58
2	LA Giltinis (D)	11	0	5	+160	10	54
3	Houston SaberCats (Q)	9	0	7	+15	12	48
4	Seattle Seawolves (Q)	9	0	7	+73	10	46
5	San Diego Legion (Q)	8	0	8	+47	11	43
6	Utah Warriors (E)	5	0	11	+29	13	33
7	Dallas Jackals (E)	0	0	16	-554	4	4
Eastern Conference
Pos	Team	W	D	L	PD	BP	Pts
1	New England Free Jacks (Q)	13	0	3	+126	10	62
2	Rugby ATL (Q)	11	0	5	+128	13	57
3	Rugby New York (Q)	11	0	5	+25	12	56
4	Toronto Arrows (E)	8	0	8	+24	9	41
5	New Orleans Gold (E)	4	0	12	-159	9	25
6	Old Glory DC (E)	3	0	13	-168	11	23
Green background indicates teams in position for the Conference Finals; Blue background indicates teams in position for the Conference Semi-Finals; Austin Gilgronis and LA Giltinis were disqualified (D) from the 2022 postseason.

On November 9, 2021, Major League Rugby announced the format of the 2022 season and post-season. The competition had expanded to 13 teams with the addition of the Dallas Jackals, and all teams were scheduled to play 16 games over the 18 week regular season. The teams were again divided into 2 conferences, Eastern and Western. Due to the odd number of teams, the Western conference had 7 teams, and the Eastern conference had 6 teams. This was the first time in MLR history that teams would not face all other opposition teams in the regular season. Western teams faced their conference rivals in a double round-robin format, and played 4 Eastern teams, either home or away. Eastern teams faced their conference rivals in a double round-robin format, with one additional game. They then played 5 Western teams, to complete the 16 games required for the season.

For the post-season, MLR introduced a first-round, single game playoff, called Eliminators. The 2nd ranked team in each conference hosted the 3rd ranked team, while the 1st ranked team received a bye week. The following weekend, the 1st ranked team hosted the winner of their conference's Eliminator in their Conference Final. The winner of the Conference Finals met in the Championship Final to determine the winner of the 2022 season.

On June 3, 2022, MLR announced that the Austin Gilgronis were disqualified from the 2022 post-season, due to "violation of league rules". Following the conclusion of the regular season, the Eastern-qualified teams all had greater table points than any of the Western-qualified teams. As such, the 2022 Championship Final was guaranteed to be hosted by an Eastern Conference team for the first time.

On June 7, 2022, MLR announced that the LA Giltinis were also disqualified from the 2022 post-season, again due to "violation of league rules".

== Championship Series ==
=== Eastern Conference ===
The Eastern Eliminator featured Rugby ATL hosting Rugby New York at Silverbacks Park. This marked the successive year of Atlanta hosting New York in the Championship Series, having faced each other in the 2021 Eastern Conference Final.

The first half of the match was focused on defensive decisions, and forcing penalties, as the visitors led 9-6 at halftime. The first try of the game was scored in the 44th minute, when referee Mike Lash awarded a penalty try to New York. Although Atlanta reduced the deficit with penalties, New York scored another try from the driving maul to effectively seal their victory. Atlanta were able to score a consolation try at the end of the match, but were unable to overcome New York.

June 11	Rugby ATL	19–26	Rugby New York	Silverbacks Park
20:30 EDT	Try: Kurt Coleman 80+2'; Con: Kurt Coleman (1/1) 80+3'; Pen: Kurt Coleman (4/4) 34', 40+2', 58', 65'; Cards: Connor Cook (yellow card) 2'	Report	Try: Penalty try 44'; Dylan Fawsitt 73'; Con: Automatic conversion 44'; Jason Emery (1/1) 74'; Pen: Jason Emery (4/4) 4', 19', 27', 79'; Cards: Nick Civetta (yellow card) 50'	Referee: Mike Lash (NZR) Assistants: Federico Anselmi (UAR) & Jack Gohl (RA) TMO: Nick Hannon (USAR) Man of the Match: Dylan Fawsitt (Rugby New York)

The Conference Final was hosted by the New England Free Jacks, at Veterans Memorial Stadium. This was New England's first appearance in the Championship Series since joining the league in 2020.

Although New England were able to score first and maintained the lead at half-time, it was New York that was able to seal the victory with two tries in the second half. The victory marked New York's first Eastern Conference Championship win, and the first time that the team that finished first in the Eastern Conference did not reach the Championship Final.

June 19	New England Free Jacks	16–24	Rugby New York	Veterans Memorial Stadium
15:00 EDT	Try: Beaudein Waaka 4'; Con: Beaudein Waaka (1/1) 5'; Pen: Beaudein Waaka (3/3) 17', 28', 46'; Cards: Reegan O'Gorman (yellow card) 73'	Report	Try: Benjamín Bonasso 19'; Nehe Milner-Skudder 69'; Andrew Coe 76'; Con: Jason Emery (1/1) 20'; Sam Windsor (2/2) 70', 77'; Pen: Jason Emery (1/2) 32'	Attendance: 3,500; Referee: Federico Anselmi (UAR) Assistants: Mike Lash (NZR) & Cisco Lopez (USAR) TMO: Nick Hannon (USAR) Man of the Match: Andrew Coe (Rugby New York)

=== Western Conference ===
The Western Eliminator featured the Seattle Seawolves hosting the San Diego Legion at Starfire Stadium. Seattle and San Diego returned to the Championship Series for the first time since 2019, where both teams contested in that season's Championship Final.

Although San Diego were the first team to get on the scoreboard, the impressive points total from AJ Alatimu alone was enough to see off the Legion, as Seattle claimed a fifth successive win in their MLR post-season matches, as well as a 3-0 winning streak over San Diego.

June 12	Seattle Seawolves	43–19	San Diego Legion	Starfire Sports Stadium
19:00 PDT	Try: Sam Matenga 11'; Duncan Matthews 19'; Travis Larsen 62'; Ross Neal 67'; Con: AJ Alatimu (3/3) 12', 20', 68'; Automatic conversion 62'; Pen: AJ Alatimu (5/5) 7', 14', 46', 56', 74'; Cards: Riekert Hattingh (yellow card) 50'	Report	Try: Nate Augspurger 2'; Tevita Tameilau 28'; Jason Higgins 77'; Con: Joe Pietersen (2/2) 3', 29'; Josh Henderson (0/1)	Referee: Scott Green (USAR) Assistants: Luke Rogan (USAR) & Lex Weiner (USAR) TMO: Austin Reed (USAR) Man of the Match: Duncan Matthews (Seattle Seawolves)

The Conference Final was hosted by the Houston SaberCats, at AVEVA Stadium. This was the first time Houston had reached the Championship Series, and the first Championship Series game ever to be hosted in Texas.

Despite scoring first, Houston were outmatched by Seattle, with the visitors able to take the lead early on in the match, and retained it throughout the game. This result awards Seattle their first Western Conference Championship, their third appearance in the Championship Final, and the first time the first-ranked team in the Western Conference did not reach the Championship Final (since the conference system was introduced.)

June 18	Houston SaberCats	27–46	Seattle Seawolves	Aveva Stadium
19:00 EDT	Try: David Coetzer 6'; Gerrie Labuschagné 42'; Christian Dyer (2) 47', 75'; Con: David Coetzer (2/4) 7', 48'; Pen: Gerrie Labuschagné (1/1) 13'	Report	Try: James Malcolm 17'; Juan-Philip Smith 29'; Duncan Matthews (2) 31', 60'; Mzamo Majola 54'; Ross Neal 57'; Con: AJ Alatimu (4/5) 32', 55', 58', 61'; Automatic conversion 29'; Pen: AJ Alatimu (2/2) 9', 24'	Attendance: 2,341; Referee: Scott Green (USAR) Assistants: Luke Rogan (USAR) & Kahlil Harrison (USAR) TMO: Derek Summers (USAR) Man of the Match: AJ Alatimu (Seattle Seawolves)

== Venue ==
On June 21, it was announced that the Championship Final would be held at the Red Bull Arena, in Harrison, New Jersey. The Arena had previously hosted rugby union matches, including an Premiership Rugby match between London Irish and Saracens, as well as an International game between the United States and Ireland. This was the first time that an MLR Championship Final match was held at a venue that wasn't the home ground of any MLR team.

== Broadcasting ==
The match was broadcast in the United States on Fox, and available internationally on The Rugby Network.

== Match ==
June 25, 2022
12:00 EDT (UTC−04)

Rugby New York	30–15	Seattle Seawolves
Try: Will Tucker 8'; Penalty try 24'; Andy Ellis 35'; Nic Mayhew '56; Con: Jason Emery (1/3) 9'; Automatic conversion 24'; Pen: Jason Emery (1/2) 50'; Drop: Sam Windsor (1/1) 73'; Cards: Will Tucker (yellow card) 66'	Report	Try: Martin Iosefo 4'; Sam Matenga 61'; Con: AJ Alatimu (1/2) 62'; Pen: AJ Alatimu (1/1) 13'; Cards: Rhyno Herbst (yellow card) 24'

Red Bull Arena, Harrison
Attendance: 1,979
Referee: Federico Anselmi (Argentina)

FB	15	(New Zealand) Nehe Milner Skudder
RW	14	(New Zealand) Waisake Naholo
OC	13	(New Zealand) Fa'asiu Fuatai
IC	12	(New Zealand) Jason Emery
LW	11	(Canada) Andrew Coe
FH	10	(New Zealand) Jack Heighton
SH	9	(New Zealand) Andy Ellis
N8	8	(New Zealand) Antonio Kiri Kiri
OF	7	(New Zealand) Brendon O'Connor
BF	6	(New Zealand) Will Tucker
RL	5	(United States) Nate Brakeley (c)
LL	4	(United States) Ben Bonasso (vc)
TP	3	(Brazil) Wilton Rebolo
HK	2	(United States) Dylan Fawsitt
LP	1	(United States) Chance Wenglewski
Replacements:
HK	16	(United States) Kaleb Geiger
PR	17	(New Zealand) Nic Mayhew
PR	18	(Samoa) Kalolo Tuiloma
LK	19	(United States) Nick Civetta
FL	20	(United States) Joe Basser
SH	21	(United States) Conor McManus
FH	22	(Australia) Sam Windsor
CE	23	(Canada) Quinn Ngawati
Coach:
(New Zealand) Marty Veale

FB	15	(England) Mat Turner
RW	14	(England) Ross Neal
OC	13	(South Africa) Dan Kriel
IC	12	(Ireland) David Busby
LW	11	(United States) Martin Iosefo
FH	10	(Samoa) AJ Alatimu
SH	9	(South Africa) Juan-Philip Smith
N8	8	(United States) Riekert Hattingh (c)
OF	7	(Canada) Travis Larsen
BF	6	(United States) Andrew Durutalo
RL	5	(South Africa) Rhyno Herbst
LL	4	(United States) Samu Manoa
TP	3	(New Zealand) Samuel Matenga
HK	2	(Scotland) James Malcolm
LP	1	(South Africa) Mzamo Majola
Replacements:
HK	16	(Ireland) Sean McNulty
PR	17	(United States) Kellen Gordon
PR	18	(United States) Taniela Tupou
LK	19	(New Zealand) Brad Tucker
FL	20	(United States) Tommy Clark
SH	21	(Canada) Reid Watkins
CE	22	(United States) Tavite Lopeti
WG	23	(United States) Launia Futi
Coach:
(Ireland) Allen Clarke

Man of the Match:
Andy Ellis (Rugby New York)
Assistant referees:
Mike Lash (New Zealand)
Cisco Lopez (United States)
Television match official:
Nick Hannon (United States)
