= GHSA =

GHSA may refer to:

- Georgia High School Association, an organization that governs athletics and activities for high schools in Georgia
- Global Health Security Agenda, international effort operating in the field on infection prevention and control
- GitHub Security Advisory, a computer security disclosure
