= Hyatt Regency San Francisco Airport =

Hotel in Burlingame

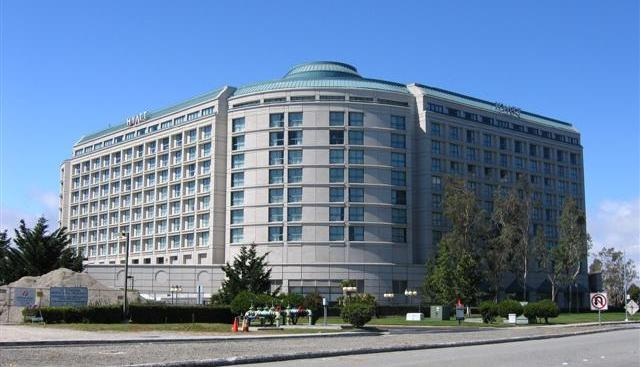
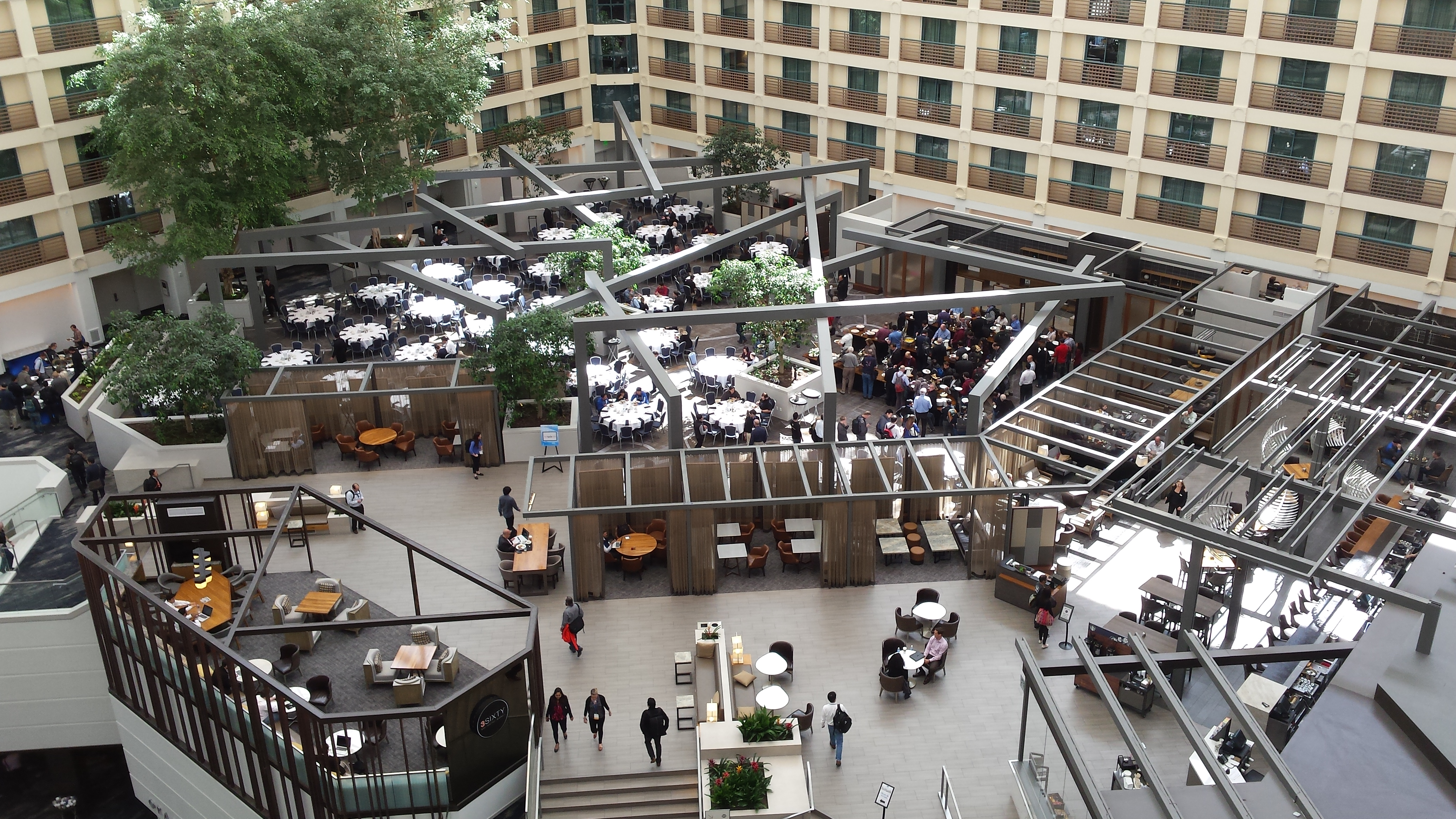
- Top: Exterior in 2004, looking northwest Bottom: Remodeled atrium in 2017

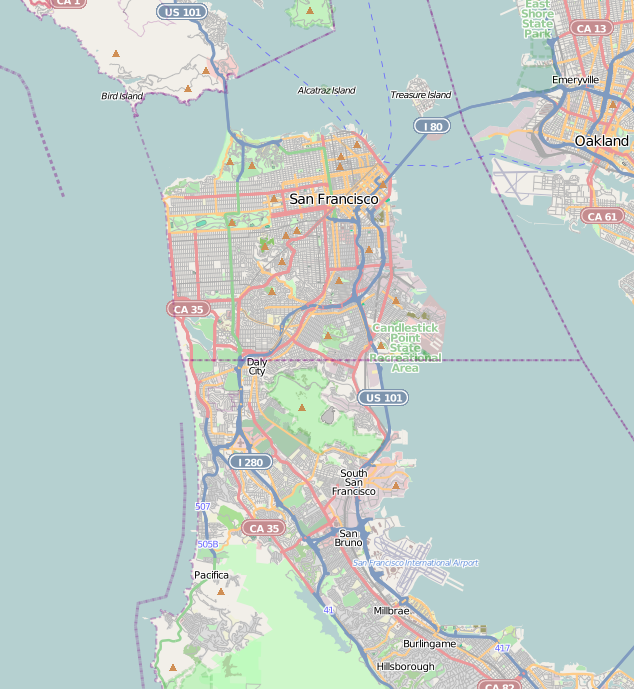
- Location within San Francisco Location within San Francisco Bay Area Location within California Location within the United States
- Former names: Hyatt House Hotel, Burlingame
- Alternative names: Hyatt Regency SFO; Hyatt Regency, Burlingame
- Hotel chain: Hyatt Hotels Corporation

General information
- Architectural style: Brutalist (exterior)
- Location: 1333 Bayshore Highway, Burlingame, California, United States
- Coordinates: 37.5939°N 122.3652°W
- Named for: San Francisco International Airport
- Opened: 1959
- Renovated: 1988
- Renovation cost: $90 million
- Owner: Host Hotels & Resorts
- Operator: Hyatt Hotels Corporation

Technical details
- Size: 650,000 sq. ft.
- Floor count: 10

Other information
- Number of rooms: 789
- Number of suites: 26

Website
- Official website

The Hyatt Regency San Francisco Airport, also known as the Hyatt Regency SFO, (Note: The IATA airport code for San Francisco International Airport is SFO.) is an airport hotel located on Bayshore Highway near San Francisco International Airport in the Bay Area city of Burlingame, California. It is the original location of the second – and first built by the company – Hyatt hotel. Since 1998 it has been owned by Host Hotels & Resorts.

== Design ==
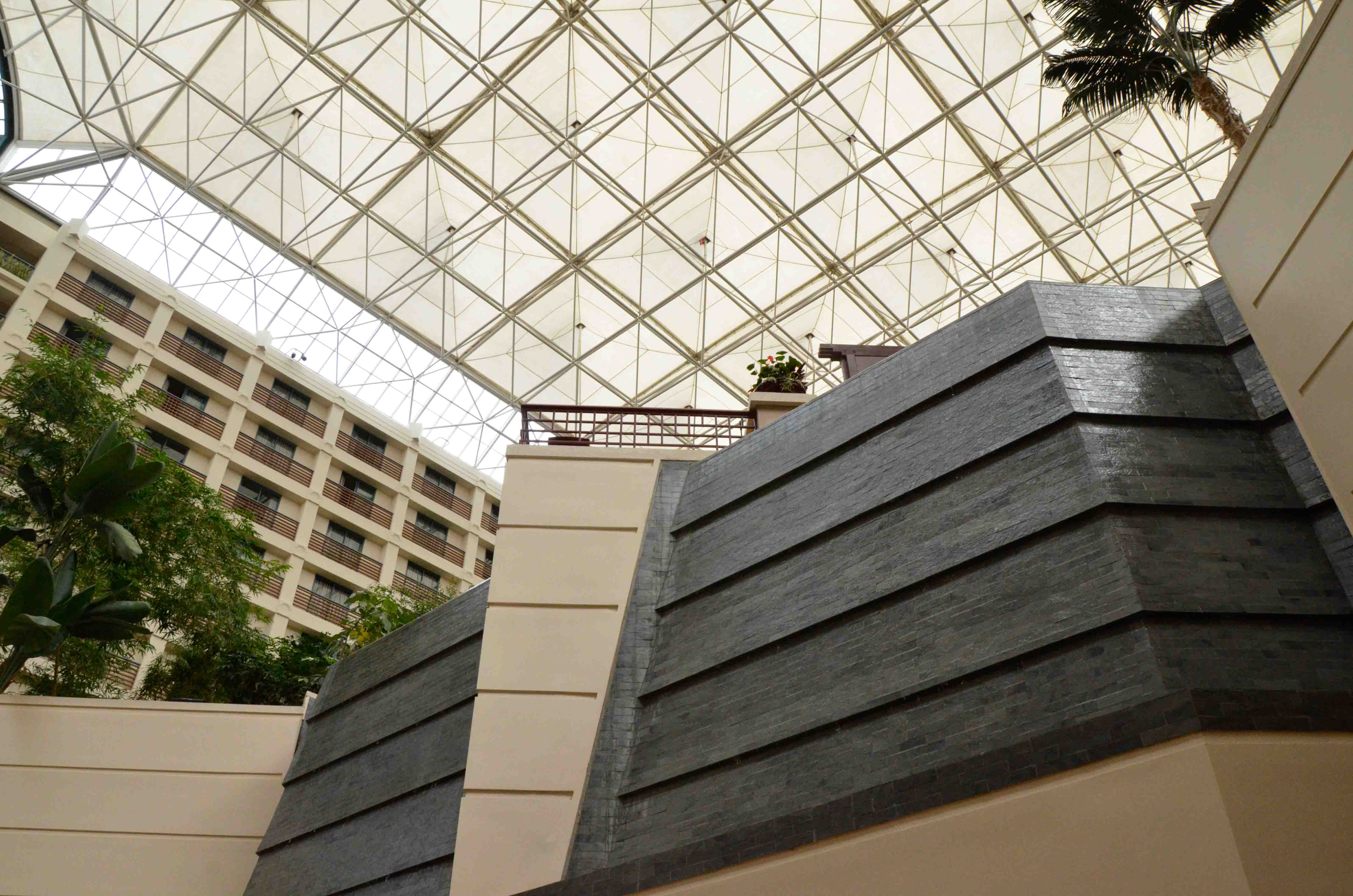
View of the space frame roof from the lower lobby in 2013

With the design and opening of the Hyatt Regency Atlanta in 1967, the Hyatt Regency brand trademark became its open atriums containing trees, waterfalls, and glass elevators, aiming to be tourist attractions of their own. The Bayshore Highway Hyatt became the Hyatt Regency Burlingame and underwent reconstruction in the 1980s, with $90 million spent to re-open in 1988 with around 800 rooms over 10 floors. In 1989, the hotel's distinct appearance was described in Building Design and Construction, explaining that it has "an 182-ft. by 182-ft. space frame that is covered by a Teflon-coated fiberglass fabric" and a "glass daylight system ... attached to its perimeter."

The Hyatt Regency San Francisco Airport had a major interior remodelling in 2016, at which point it had 789 rooms, of which 26 are suites, and 120,000 square feet of public space. This renovation modernized the lobby space while redesigning most areas of the hotel; sound-absorbing panels and dividing beams were added to the atrium with the intention to make it more relaxing while keeping the open space.

== History ==
=== Hyatt House Hotel ===
In 1957, Jay Pritzker purchased the first Hyatt hotel, which was sited near Los Angeles International Airport. Pritzker and his brothers then founded the Hyatt company with the intention of creating a chain of first-class hotels near airports; the first hotel they built was the Hyatt House Hotel, Burlingame. It opened in 1959 at 1333 Bayshore Highway in Burlingame, two miles from San Francisco International Airport. Hyatt moved its headquarters to the Burlingame hotel before 1961, where it was still located in 1976. The hotel initially had 225 rooms and suites, and operated a complementary limousine service to and from the airport. It was expanded in 1965; the new complex was "a ring of buildings with a pool at the center." The pool was Olympic-sized, and the hotel had 300 rooms and suites as well as conference facilities. It was promoted as the "World's First Fly-In Hotel."

=== Hyatt Regency ===
Shortly after its 1988 rebuild, the hotel suffered structural damage in the 1989 Loma Prieta earthquake. It managed to stay open during the quake, though without main power, but had to evacuate staff and guests early the following morning for a safety inspection. The hotel was then closed until July 1990 for structural repairs to its foundation, at an estimated cost of $5 million.

It was sold to Host Hotels & Resorts (then Host Marriott Corporation) in 1998, while still managed by and branded Hyatt.

Following the September 11 attacks in 2001, the Transportation Security Administration opened a security training and assessment center in the hotel, due to its proximity to the airport.

In October 2016 a man was shot dead on the hotel's driveway.

In 2020, it began pilot testing a Google Assistant-based concierge translation device and, along with many Hyatt hotels worldwide, became Global Biorisk Advisory Council certified.

==== Republican conventions ====
In 1996, the California Republican Party Convention was held at the hotel. In 2008, Vice-presidential candidate Sarah Palin held a fundraiser at the hotel during the presidential debates period, where she gave a speech criticizing Barack Obama. The event drew crowds of supporters and protesters outside the hotel; the groups were peaceful and mixed together.

The 2016 California Republican Party Convention was held in the hotel in April and May 2016, with then-presidential candidate Donald Trump opening the convention on April 29 with a campaign speech. Trump supporters showed up at the hotel, as did protesters, with the groups clashing in what became rioting when Trump's motorcade arrived; a flag and an effigy of Trump were burned in front of the hotel and arrests were made. As riot police struggled to subdue up to 10,000 protesters, Trump had to enter the hotel through a side door off the freeway. A Trump lookalike was attacked outside the hotel and escorted inside. At the time Trump was due to make his speech, protesters attempted to disrupt it, throwing objects at the hotel and damaging its glass panels. They broke through barricades and some protesters tried to enter the building, causing enough alarm to delay the speech. Some protesters did make it into the hotel, several having booked rooms in advance to be permitted inside, with one being removed from the convention floor and others hanging large banners (which could be seen outside through windows) inside the lobby. Protesters included Burlingame High School students in matching tie-dye, topless Free the Nipple activists, and brothers dressed as Mexican-American versions of Captain America and the Winter Soldier. No protesters showed up on April 30 when candidate Ted Cruz was attending the convention.
