= Sports Illustrated Stadium =

Soccer-specific stadium in the United States

- The Fortress

- Interior view of Sports Illustrated Stadium, 2010

- Location near New York City Location in New Jersey Location in the United States
- Former names: Red Bull Park (2006–08) (prior to opening); Red Bull Arena (2008–2024)
- Address: 600 Cape May Street
- Location: Harrison, New Jersey, U.S.
- Coordinates: 40°44′12″N 74°9′1″W
- Owner: Hudson County Improvement Authority
- Operator: Red Bull GmbH
- Capacity: 25,000
- Surface: Kentucky Bluegrass
- Field size: 120 yd × 75 yd (110 m × 69 m)
- Public transit: PATH: Harrison NWK–WTC NJT Bus: 40

Construction
- Groundbreaking: September 19, 2006
- Opened: March 20, 2010
- Cost: $200 million
- Architect: Rossetti Architects
- Structural engineers: Paulus, Sokolowski & Sartor, LLC.
- Services engineer: URS Corporation
- General contractor: Hunter Roberts Construction Group

Tenants
- New York Red Bulls (MLS) (2010–present); Gotham FC (NWSL) (2020–present); New York City FC (MLS) (2020–present, part-time); New York Red Bulls II (MLSNP) (2015–2016, 2018, 2020)

Website
- sportsillustratedstadium.com

Sports Illustrated Stadium is a soccer-specific stadium in Harrison, New Jersey, United States, that is home to the New York Red Bulls of Major League Soccer and Gotham FC of the National Women's Soccer League. It opened under its former name, Red Bull Arena, in 2010. Featuring a transparent partial roof, it is located on the waterfront in the Riverbend District of Harrison across the Passaic River from Newark and approximately 7 miles (12 km) west of Lower Manhattan, New York City. With a seating capacity of 25,000, it is the sixth-largest soccer-specific stadium in the United States and in Major League Soccer.

On December 11, 2024, the venue's name was changed to Sports Illustrated Stadium as part of a new, 13-year agreement between the Red Bulls and Sports Illustrated Tickets.

== Initial planning ==
The original plan to build a soccer specific stadium in the New York Metropolitan area was announced during the 2000 MLS season at ESPN Zone in Times Square by the President & GM of the MetroStars Nick Sakiewicz and owner Stuart Subotnick. Nick Sakiewicz led the complex, nearly 5-year effort in search of a site to build. On July 1, 2004, Sakiewicz, New Jersey governor Richard Codey, Harrison Mayor Ray McDonough and Harrison Redevelopment Chair Peter Higgins along with MLS commissioner Don Garber announced the MetroStars (as the New York Red Bulls were known at the time) would move from their home at Giants Stadium to a site in Harrison, New Jersey.

Harrison was chosen for its mass transit and interstate connections, proximity to New York City and its long history and reputation as a soccer cultural hotbed centered around the famed Harrison Soccer Courts. The West Hudson County area has been called the "Cradle of American Soccer" and home to historic teams such as Clark O.N.T., West Hudson A.A. and the Kearny Scots dating back to the late 19th and early 20th century. On November 28, 1885, the neighboring town of Kearny hosted the first international soccer match held outside of the United Kingdom between the United States and Canada at Clark Field in the neighborhood that is now East Newark. Harrison Park was located a few blocks northwest of the stadium site and was the home field of West Hudson A.A. It also hosted the American Cup final in 1920 and 1921 and the U.S. Open Cup final in 1918 and 1923.

Negotiations between MLS and the state of New Jersey dragged on until an agreement was announced on August 5, 2005, for the MetroStars to build and complete construction of a new dedicated soccer facility for the 2007 season. Concerns about environmental clean-up at the selected site forced another delay. Groundbreaking took place September 19, 2006, and construction was set for November 2007, that was delayed by one month when Red Bull GmbH bought the MetroStars from Anschutz Entertainment Group (AEG), changing the club's name in the process. After projections of opening during the 2008, and then the 2009 season, on January 23, 2009, it was announced that the arena opening would be delayed until 2010.

Nick Sakiewicz moved on to create MLS' 16th franchise in Philadelphia and build a soccer specific stadium in that market which launched in 2010. According to Erik Stover, Red Bulls managing director at the time, Harrison Redevelopment Agency chairman Peter B. Higgins was "quite simply the reason that the New York Red Bulls have a new home in Harrison. His vision and leadership guided us through numerous difficulties." The Higgins' contribution is memorialized by the naming of the street at the main gates along the west side of the stadium as Pete Higgins Boulevard.

== Red Bull buyout and new design ==
Former logo as Red Bull Arena

In addition to purchasing the team, Red Bull bought out AEG's $100 million share of the stadium, an after-effect of lasting disagreements between the two corporations regarding their plans for the facility. Their differences prompted a significant delay in the early stages of the stadium's construction. After the naming rights of the soccer team were acquired, leading to the name Red Bull Park, Red Bull instituted a number of changes to the stadium's original design, which sparked tension between the Austrian-based energy drink company and AEG. Red Bull opted out of AEG's plan to construct a stage in the stadium for performances, one that would have increased profit margins for the group.

The updated design was completed by Rossetti architects from Detroit and was built by New Jersey–based Hunter Roberts Construction Group, LLC. The stadium's unique roofing system was engineered, fabricated, and installed by the projects specialty roofing contractor Birdair of Amherst, New York, a suburb of Buffalo.

== Design and features ==
A tension-fabric curved exterior shell of PTFE fiberglass wraps around the entire two-tiered stadium, creating the distinguishing roof feature of Sports Illustrated Stadium. The roof extends 120 feet (37 m) from the last row of seats to just past the field's touchlines, with 60 feet (18 m) of the roof being translucent to allow for natural light and at 322,276 sq ft (29,940.4 m^{2}), it is the largest roof canopy of all Major League Soccer stadiums, covering all 25,000 seats. The low and enclosed roof design is known for providing superior acoustics by holding, amplifying and reflecting crowd noise back onto the field. Dual 800 sq ft (74 m^{2}) light-emitting diode (LED) HD Panasonic video boards were suspended from the north and south ends of the roof. In early 2019, both video boards were replaced with two new 1,325 sq ft (123.1 m^{2}) LED Daktronics displays as part of stadium wide upgrades.

The seats of Sports Illustrated Stadium are of the tip-up variety, without arm rests (except for a few sections near the player benches which feature small arm rests and cup holders), similar to those of European soccer stadiums with the first row of seating approximately 21 feet (6.4 m) from the touchlines. The stadium's seating is raked at 33 degrees for optimal sight-lines. Included in the 25,000 seats are 30 luxury suites and 1,000 premium seats. The Red Bull logo is patterned in red and yellow lower-level seats directly opposite the team benches and player entrance tunnel.

Sections 133, 101 and 102 collectively make up the 1,500 seat home supporters section known as the South Ward. Among the former blue seats in the South Ward was the "Red Seat" located at Section 101, Row 11, Seat 20. The Red Seat signifies the Red Bulls first goal scored at Sports Illustrated Stadium; Section 101 represents the stadium's first game, Row 11 marks the minute of the game in which the goal was scored and Seat 20 remembers the goal scorer, No. 20 Joel Lindpere. Following the passing of Empire Supporters Club member Mike Vallo, the Red Seat's No. 20 was replaced by the initials "MV" to honor him. Ahead of the 2020 season, the Red Bulls converted the South Ward into a safe standing section with a rail seating system with cup holders, similar to the system in place at BMO Stadium in Los Angeles. This system allows supporters to watch matches while standing but also contain unlock-able individual red fold-down seats to convert the section to standard seating for international matches and other events. The Red Seat was removed and given to the Vallo Family and a new location in Section 101 was selected to commemorate Mike Vallo. An open standing area was created directly behind the South Ward for supporters to gather while maintaining a view of the field. Sports Illustrated Stadium is the third soccer-specific stadium in North America to have a safe standing with rail seating system. The South Ward supporters have their own signed and dedicated entrance at Gate D.

On the west side of Sports Illustrated Stadium is the retired jersey number "99" of striker Bradley Wright-Phillips; the first to be retired by the Red Bulls. Alongside the number 99 are listed the years honoring the Red Bull teams that won the Supporters' Shield in 2013, 2015, and 2018 and Conference Championships in 2008 and 2024. In 2022, Legends Row was created with the first inductee goalkeeper Luis Robles followed by Bradley Wright-Phillips in 2026. Gotham FC's 2023 NWSL Championship and 2025 NWSL Championship are honored in Legends Row.

The lower bowl of the stadium is constructed of concrete, while the upper bowl is constructed of galvanized-metal. The Red Bulls intentionally chose galvanized-metal for the upper bowl so fans could create more noise by stomping their feet. In addition, the main concourse is elevated 26 feet (7.9 m) high, eliminating a majority of field-level entryways. On the North side of the main concourse are 13 "Red Beams"; each one memorializing a special moment in the club's history. In 2022, a mural was added to the main concourse at the "Horizon Gate". The mural was painted by artist Elijah Minton and is designed to "represent the Red Bulls loyal supporters, fans, culture, energy and passion for the game of soccer from our neighborhoods to the walls of (Red Bull Arena)."

In 2017, the Red Bulls opened MLS's first permanent sensory room for individuals and families affected by autism. The space was formerly used as executive offices by the club's general manager Marc de Grandpre, whose daughter is on the autism spectrum. The sensory room overlooks mid-field and features dimmed lighting and lightly colored walls to offer a soothing environment, along with visual aids, fidget toys and other activities. There is no special ticket or any charge required for use of the room. In 2025, the sensory room was updated and enhanced with input from KultureCity and renamed the "Altec Lansing Sensory Room". Altec Lansing equipped the sensory room with state-of-the-art noise-canceling headphones for guests with sensory challenges to use during matches and events.

Ahead of the 2022 MLS season, the Red Bulls fully renovated the Premium Levels of Sports Illustrated Stadium including the Audi Club, Bulls Corner, Provident Bank Suite Lounge and its 27 indoor suites and created a new area called the Midfield Suite. The Midfield Suite acts as a common area for all suite ticket holders and provides panoramic views of the field. A new satellite premium "BULLShop" was created on the fourth floor and a new gaming lounge was created on the 5th floor that gives suite guests access to gaming stations and lounge seating.

On June 6, 2023, the Red Bulls opened a new outdoor pre-match event space known as "CrossBar". The space includes a permanent stage and viewing area, a weather-proof option for pre-match events, along with new and upgraded furniture, gaming areas and bar and concession area. In 2026, the space was reimagined as "Hype House", a premium social club space with field level access.

Ahead of the 2024 MLS season, the Red Bulls upgraded Sports Illustrated Stadium's lighting system by installing a Musco Lighting TLC for LED system. The new system has color-changing fixtures that allow for higher on-field lighting levels, dynamic lighting for in-game moments and celebrations and reduce energy consumption by 20%. A new LED ribbon board was also installed around the upper bowl of the stadium.

Ahead of the 2025 MLS season, the Red Bulls created "Club SI" an indoor-outdoor premium space behind the home team's bench at midfield. The 4,510 sq ft (419 m^{2}) indoor lounge was designed by Populous and the outside seating area consists of 188 movie theater-style cushioned chairs with the front row called the "Manager’s Box" providing access to a balcony over the player entrance tunnel.

== Construction ==
Red Bull Arena under construction in Harrison, New Jersey on March 10, 2009

Construction commenced on Red Bull Park on January 3, 2008, on the site of a former Remco factory service building, including the first of 3,000 timber piles driven into the ground to support the new stadium. On January 11, 2008, Erik Stover was announced as the new general manager of Red Bull Arena during construction and then on after. He had served as GM of Qualcomm Stadium in San Diego since 2005. On February 20, 2008, a CAN$28–$30 million contract was announced with Structal-Heavy Steel Construction to assist in the fabrication and construction of steel components. Fabrication began offsite in the second quarter of 2008, and erection in Fall, 2008. Total project size is estimated at 9,000 tons of structural steel.

The first steel girder was put in place on August 19, 2008. The arena was reported by The New York Times to be 55% complete on March 27, 2009. The last major beam for the roof was topped out on April 14, 2009. Enclosure panels started going up on May 7, 2009. The first section of the Red Bull Arena roof was completed in August 2009. The underground drainage and turf-heating system installation began on August 18, 2009.

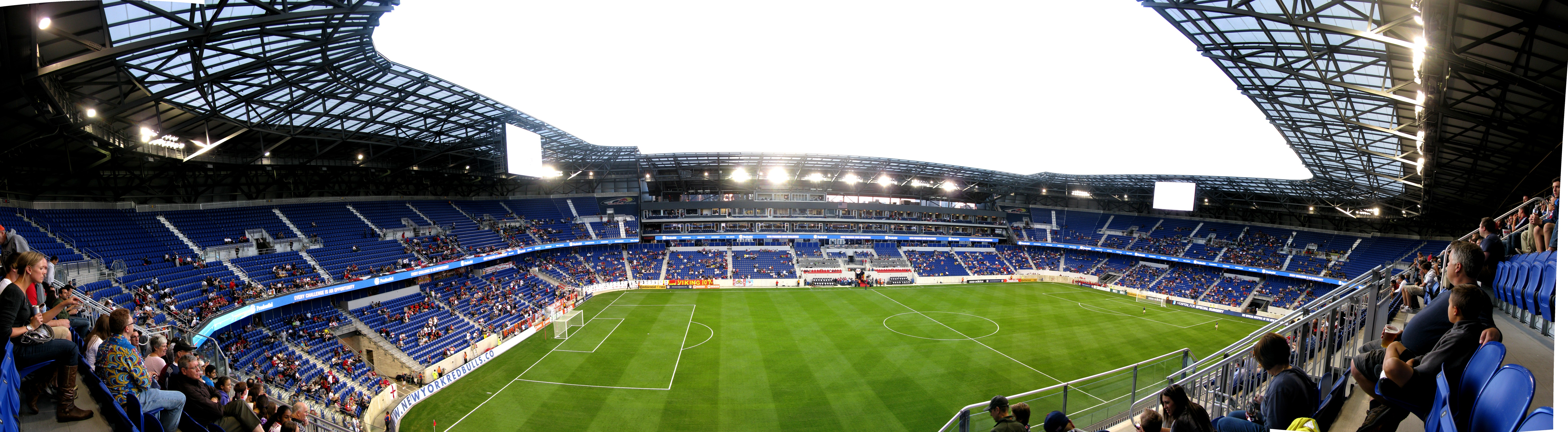
Sports Illustrated Stadium internal view

== Tax controversy ==
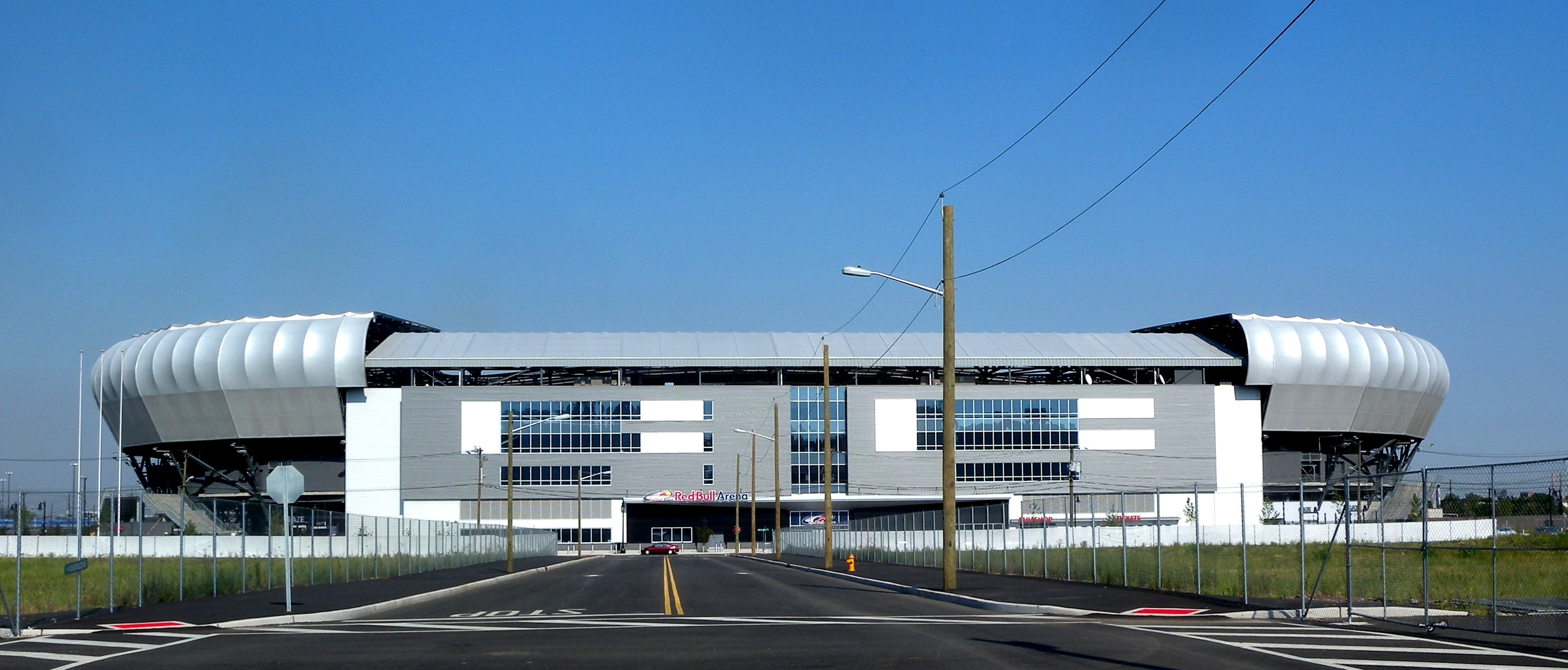
Exterior of Red Bull Arena in 2010.

In 2010, the Red Bulls refused to pay a $1.4 million property tax levy to the town of Harrison, claiming that the stadium was exempt from paying taxes. The team also refused to pay a $1.3 million for 2011. While the team did eventually pay the back taxes, it subsequently filed a lawsuit to have the payments reimbursed by the town, claiming the stadium was exempt from local taxes.

On June 30, 2012, the Tax Court of New Jersey ruled that Harrison did have the right to tax both Red Bull Arena and the land underneath it and denied the team's claim for reimbursement. This decision was upheld by an appellate court in May 2014. The Red Bulls appealed to the state Supreme Court, who in October 2014 agreed to hear the case. The Supreme Court referred the parties to mediation.

A settlement was proposed in which the Hudson County Improvement Authority would take over ownership of the land and stadium and enter into a lease agreement with the team, using the lease payments to give Harrison an annual PILOT (Payment In Lieu of Taxes) tied to the Consumer Price Index. The settlement was approved by the Harrison Town Council and mayor on March 16, 2016.

On July 14, 2016, the Red Bulls and town agreed to a revised settlement, in which the stadium and land will be turned over to the Hudson County Improvement Authority. The Red Bulls will pay an annual rent of $1.3 million, escalated annually based on the Consumer Price Index, of which $1.115 million will go to the town of Harrison. The lease agreement will be in place through 2038, with team options through 2058. At the end of the lease term, ownership of the stadium will revert to the town. This agreement must be finalized by the end of 2016.

== Naming rights ==
The acquisition of the MetroStars by Red Bull GmbH in 2006 included the naming rights to the future stadium. Red Bull began exploring an outside naming rights sponsor for the stadium as early as 2015. On December 11, 2024, the Red Bulls announced a 13-year agreement with Sports Illustrated Tickets, a ticket platform owned by Authentic Brands Group that licenses the branding of sports magazine Sports Illustrated; the sponsorship does not involve the newsroom operations of Sports Illustrated. The agreement will include the use of Sports Illustrated Tickets as the official ticketing partner of events at the stadium beginning in 2026 after it replaces Ticketmaster.

== Events ==
=== Soccer ===
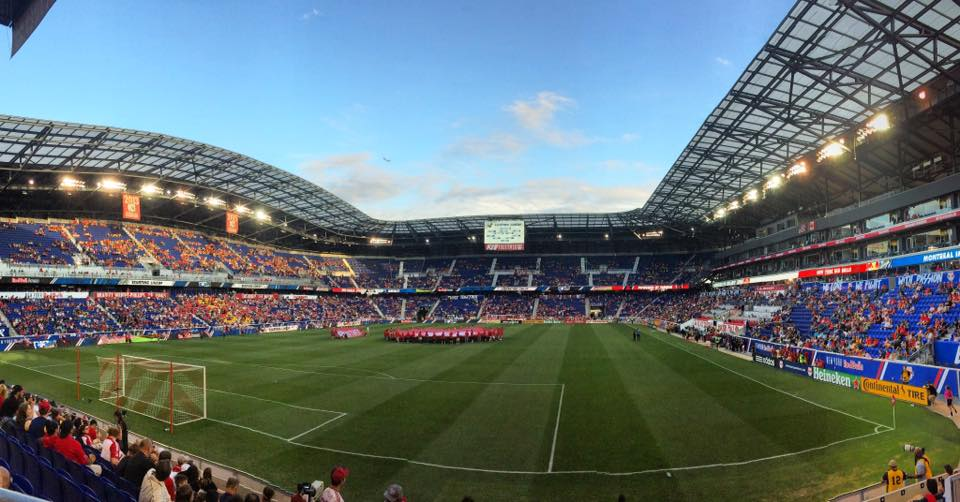
The stadium before a match between the Red Bulls and Montreal Impact

A soft opening of the stadium, a match between the Red Bulls Under-18 Academy team and the United States U-17 men's national soccer team scheduled for March 13, 2010, was postponed due to heavy rain and high wind. The facility instead opened on March 20, 2010, as the Red Bulls played a friendly match against Brazilian club Santos FC winning before a sold-out crowd 3–1.

The first official match, the MLS season opener against the Chicago Fire, took place March 27, 2010, with the Red Bulls winning 1–0 in front of a sold-out crowd. Joel Lindpere became the first player to score a goal at Red Bull Arena.

Red Bull Arena hosted its first-ever international soccer game in May 2010, when Turkey beat the Czech Republic in front of a crowd of 16,371. The stadium also hosted an exhibition between Ecuador and Colombia in October 2010. The game drew a sellout crowd of 25,000.

On June 13, 2011, Red Bull Arena hosted two group stage matches of the 2011 CONCACAF Gold Cup. The first match saw the Guatemala national football team defeat the Grenada national football team 4–0. The second match saw the Jamaica national football team defeat the Honduras national football team 1–0. Both matches were attended by a sellout crowd of 25,000 fans.

On June 28, 2011, Red Bull Arena hosted its first ever Lamar Hunt U.S. Open Cup match with the Red Bulls defeating USL Pro team F.C. New York 2–1.

On July 27, 2011, Red Bull Arena hosted the 2011 MLS All-Star Game with the MLS All-Stars playing Manchester United where United won 4–0.

On October 8, 2011, Red Bull Arena hosted its first New Jersey high school soccer game when the Harrison Blue Tide hosted the Kearny Kardinals in both boys' and girls' soccer matches.

On October 11, 2011, Red Bull Arena hosted its first United States men's national soccer team match, as the US squad lost 1–0 to the Ecuador national football team in an international friendly.

On November 13, 2011, Red Bull Arena hosted the semifinals and championship match of the 2011 Big East Conference Men's Soccer Tournament, a college soccer tournament. The 2012 Big East Men's Soccer Tournament was supposed to be held at Red Bull Arena but was moved to Subaru Park in Chester, Pennsylvania due to the effects of Hurricane Sandy.

On July 28, 2012, Red Bull Arena hosted the Trophée des champions, a soccer game between the champions of Ligue 1 and the winners of the Coupe de France: Montpellier HSC vs Olympique Lyonnais. Lyon won on penalties after the match ended 2–2. The match was organized by Ligue de Football Professionnel.

On June 20, 2013, the United States women's national soccer team played an international friendly against the South Korea women's national football team. It was in Red Bull Arena that United States forward Abby Wambach scored four goals, beating Mia Hamm's record of 158 goals, for the most international goals scored ever by a male or female player as part of 5–0 United States victory.

On July 8, 2013, Red Bull Arena hosted two group stage matches of the 2013 CONCACAF Gold Cup. The first match saw the El Salvador national football team and the Trinidad and Tobago national football team play to a 2–2 draw. The second match saw the Honduras national football team defeat the Haiti national football team 2–0. Both matches were attended by a crowd of 20,000 fans.

On October 27, 2013, the New York Red Bulls won their first ever Supporters' Shield championship by beating the Chicago Fire 5–2 in front of a sold-out crowd of 25,219.

On July 26, 2014, the New York Red Bulls defeated reigning FA Cup champions Arsenal F.C. 1–0 in the 2014 New York Cup in front of a sold-out crowd of 25,219.

On August 26, 2014, Red Bull Arena hosted the CONCACAF Champions League for the first time with the New York Red Bulls defeating C.D. FAS 2–0 in a group stage match.

On July 22, 2015, the New York Red Bulls defeated reigning Premier League champions Chelsea F.C. 4–2 as part of the 2015 International Champions Cup in front of a crowd of 24,076.

On July 26, 2015, the New York Red Bulls defeated reigning and back-to-back Primeira Liga champions S.L. Benfica 2–1 as part of the 2015 International Champions Cups in front 18,906 fans.

The New York Red Bulls II of the United Soccer League played their home games at Red Bull Arena from 2015 to 2016, then moved to Montclair State University's MSU Soccer Park at Pittser Field for the 2017 Season.

On August 12, 2016, Major League Soccer, in collaboration with the United Soccer League and oversight by the International Football Association Board, made history by becoming the first soccer league in the world to use video assistant referee (VAR) in a live match. The match was between New York Red Bulls II and Orlando City B at Red Bull Arena. During the match, referee Ismail Elfath reviewed two fouls and after consultation with video assistant referee Allen Chapman, issued a red card and a yellow card in the respective incidents. New York Red Bulls II won the match 5–1.

On October 23, 2016, Red Bull Arena hosted the 2016 United Soccer League Final with New York Red Bulls II beating the Swope Park Rangers 5–1 winning their first United Soccer League Championship. New York Red Bulls II became the first Major League Soccer-owned team to win the United Soccer League title.

On March 4, 2017, Red Bull Arena hosted two matches of the 2017 SheBelieves Cup. The first match saw the France women's national football team play the Germany women's national football team to a 0–0 draw. The second match saw the England women's national football team defeat the United States women's national soccer team 1–0 in front of sold-out crowd of 26,500.

On July 7, 2017, Red Bull Arena hosted two group stage matches of the 2017 CONCACAF Gold Cup. The first match saw the Canada men's national soccer team defeat the French Guiana national football team by a score of 4–2. The second match saw the Costa Rica national football team defeat the Honduras national football team by a score of 1–0. Both matches were attended by a sellout crowd of 25,817 fans.

On July 25, 2017, Red Bull Arena hosted Tottenham Hotspur and A.S. Roma as part of the 2017 International Champions Cup. A.S. Roma defeated Tottenham Hotspur 3–2 in front of a sold-out crowd of 26,192.

On September 1, 2017, Red Bull Arena hosted its first ever World Cup Qualifier Match between the United States men's national soccer team and Costa Rica men's national football team as part of the 2018 FIFA World Cup qualification – CONCACAF fifth round. The United States lost to Costa Rica 2–0 in front of a sold-out crowd of 26,500.

On September 24, 2017, the Danone Nations Cup World Final was held at Red Bull Arena. It marked the first time the international youth soccer tournament was held in the United States in its 18-year history.

On March 4, 2018, Red Bull Arena hosted two matches of the 2018 SheBelieves Cup for the second time. The first match saw the United States women's national soccer team play the France women's national football team to a 1–1 draw in front of a sold-out crowd of 25,706. The second match saw the Germany women's national football play the England women's national soccer team to a 2–2 draw.

On July 28, 2018, Red Bull Arena hosted S.L. Benfica and Juventus FC as part of the 2018 International Champions Cup. Juventus beat Benfica in a penalty shootout 4–2 in front of a crowd of 24,194.

On June 24, 2019, Red Bull Arena hosted two group stage matches of the 2019 CONCACAF Gold Cup. The first match saw the Bermuda national football team defeat the Nicaragua national football team by a score of 2–0. The second match saw the Haiti national football team defeat the Costa Rica national football team by a score of 2–1. Both matches were attended by crowd 20,044 fans.

On July 24, 2019, Red Bull Arena hosted Fiorentina and S.L. Benfica as part of the 2019 International Champions Cup. Benfica defeated Fiorentina 2–1.

Red Bull Arena gained a new tenant on November 18, 2019, with a joint announcement by the Red Bulls and Gotham FC that the stadium would host the latter team for its home games in the National Women's Soccer League in 2020. Gotham had used Red Bull Arena for two home matches in its 2019 season, both of which drew crowds well beyond the capacity of that team's former home of Yurcak Field at Rutgers University.

On March 8, 2020, Red Bull Arena hosted two matches of the 2020 SheBelieves Cup for the third time. This was last soccer tournament in the United States to be completed before the COVID-19 pandemic shut down all professional sports in the country. The first match saw the England women's national football team defeat the Japan women's national football team 1–0. The second match resulted in the United States women's national soccer team defeat the Spain women's national football team 1–0 in front of sold-out crowd of 26,500.

In late 2020, Red Bull Arena hosted home matches for the Montreal Impact (later known as CF Montréal) due to cross-border travel restrictions amid the COVID-19 pandemic. The stadium also hosted cross-town rivals New York City FC for five matches from August to September due to scheduling conflicts at Yankee Stadium, which were resolved by October. The team had also played two 2020 CONCACAF Champions League fixtures at the stadium in February and March due to Yankee Stadium undergoing winterization procedures.

In 2021, New York City FC played eight home matches at Red Bull Arena due to other scheduling conflicts. In addition to NYCFC playing in Red Bull Arena, CF Montréal announced on June 21, 2021, that they would play a game against NYCFC on July 7 due to scheduling conflicts at DRV PNK Stadium with the 2021 CONCACAF Gold Cup.

In 2022, New York City FC played two home matches at Red Bull Arena; one regular season match and one 2022 CONCACAF Champions League match.

On July 30, 2022, the New York Red Bulls played a club friendly against FC Barcelona in front of a sold-out crowd with Barcelona winning 2–0.

On November 13, 2022, the United States women's national soccer team played the Germany women's national football team in an international friendly with the US team winning 2–1 in front of a crowd of 26,317.

On June 17, 2023, the Ecuador national football team played the Bolivia national football team in an international friendly with Ecuador winning 1–0 in front of 20,000 fans.

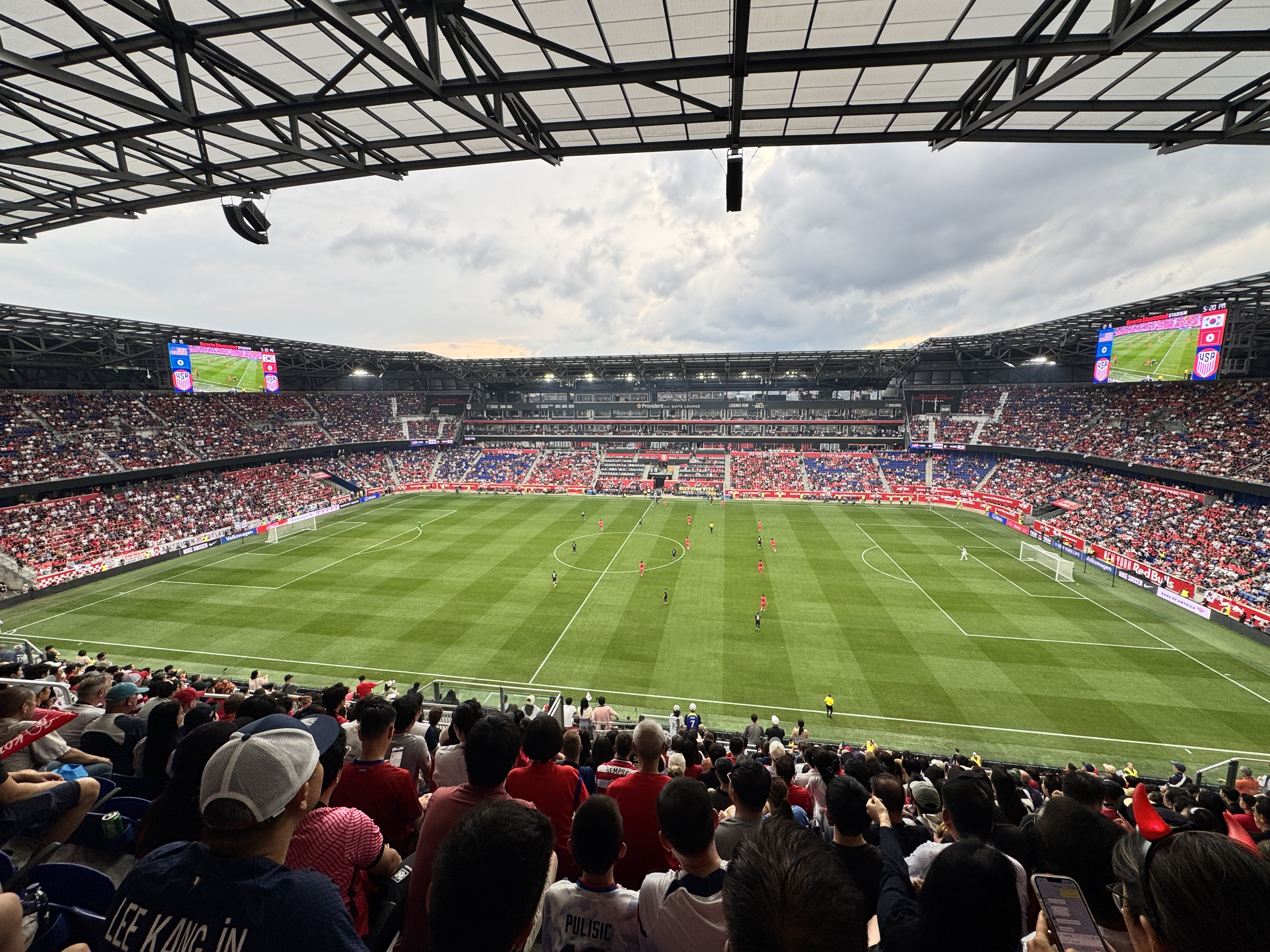
The stadium during a friendly match between United States and South Korea in 2025

The 2023 CONCACAF Gold Cup held four group stage matches at Red Bull Arena over the course of two days. On June 30, the first match saw the Panama national football team defeat the Martinique national football team 2–1 and the second match saw the El Salvador national football team and Costa Rica national football team play to a 0–0 draw. Both matches drew 22,615 fans. On July 4, the first match saw the Guatemala national football team defeat the Guadeloupe national football team 3–2 and the second match saw Costa Rica defeat Martinique by a score of 6–4. Both matches were played in front of 21,531 fans.

On July 26, 2023, New York City FC played a 2023 Leagues Cup group stage home match against Toronto FC at Red Bull Arena. They also played a regular season home match against Toronto FC during the 2023 season.

On July 28, 2023, Red Bull Arena hosted Brighton & Hove Albion vs. Newcastle United in the Premier League Summer Series where the Magpies won 2–1.

On August 3, 2023, the Red Bulls defeated New York City FC in the Round of 32 of the 2023 Leagues Cup 1–0 at Red Bull Arena eliminating City from the tournament.

On July 13, 2024, the United States women's national soccer team played the Mexico women's national football team in an international friendly prior to the 2024 Summer Olympics in Paris and honored the 20 members of the 1999 team to celebrate the 25th anniversary of their 1999 FIFA Women's World Cup victory. The United States defeated Mexico 1–0 in front of a sellout crowd of 26,376.

On July 31, 2024, RB Leipzig took on Aston Villa F.C. in an international friendly at the Arena with RB Leipzig winning 2–0.

On August 13, 2024, New York City FC played a 2024 Leagues Cup Round of 16 home match against Tigres UANL at Red Bull Arena. They also played two regular season home matches in October.

On August 19, 2024, reigning 2023 NWSL champions Gotham FC played reigning 2023 WSL champions Chelsea at Red Bull Arena in an international friendly with Chelsea defeating Gotham 3–1.

On November 10, 2024, Gotham FC played their first home playoff match at home, at Red Bull Arena, winning 2–1 against Portland Thorns.

On May 10, 2025, the Red Bulls defeated the LA Galaxy 7–0 at Sports Illustrated Stadium in a rematch of MLS Cup 2024 where the Red Bulls lost 2–1. The match saw the Red Bulls score 7 goals, the most at home by the club, and the Galaxy set a league record by starting an MLS season winless after 12 matches. The scoreline tied the widest margin of victory in an MLS Cup rematch and the MLS record for largest victory margin overall.

As part of the 2026 FIFA Men's World Cup, Sports Illustrated Stadium will host the NYNJ World Cup 26 Jersey Fan Hub festival from June 11 to July 15, 2026 and the RWJBarnabas Health Red Bulls Performance Center will serve as training grounds for the Brazil national football team.

In July 2026, Gotham FC announced they would leave the stadium in 2028 and relocate to Etihad Park in New York City. Poor field conditions ultimately led the team to move its NWSL semifinal match in November 2026 against the Kansas City Current to Icahn Stadium. Kansas City would win, 2-1.

=== Rugby union ===
In addition to soccer, the arena has also been the host of several rugby union matches. All three finals of the 2010 Churchill Cup were held at The Red Bull Arena. London Irish played their home game against Saracens in Premiership Rugby at the Red Bull Arena on March 12, 2016. This marked the first time an English premiership rugby match had been played overseas. The timing and location were selected to coincide with St. Patrick's Day festivities in an area were there is a large Irish influence. The game was televised live across the US on NBCSN. London Irish did not return the following season due to their relegation to the RFU Championship. The USA faced Ireland on June 10, 2017. This was the Eagles' first test of the 2017 summer internationals. The Eagles lost 55–19 in front of 22,370 spectators.

On June 25, 2022, the arena hosted the 2022 Major League Rugby final between Rugby New York and the Seattle Seawolves with Rugby New York winning the MLR Shield by a score of 30–15.

On March 14–15, 2026, the stadium hosted the 6th stop on the 2025-2026 HSBC Svns Series for both men's and women's Rugby Sevens. It was the final leg of the world series before the Svns World Championships in April, May and June.

Date	Home	Result	Away	Competition	Attendance	Ref.
June 19, 2010	Uruguay	19–38	Russia	2010 Churchill Cup		
June 19, 2010	United States	10–24	France A	2010 Churchill Cup		
June 19, 2010	England A	38–18	Canada	2010 Churchill Cup		
March 12, 2016	(England) London Irish	16–26	(England) Saracens F.C.	2015–16 Premiership Rugby	14,811	
June 10, 2017	United States	19–55	Ireland	2017 mid-year rugby union internationals	22,370	
June 25, 2022	(United States) Rugby New York	30–15	(United States) Seattle Seawolves	2022 Major League Rugby final	1,979	
October 30, 2026	United States	12-55	England	2026 WXV Global Series		
October 30, 2026	United States	0-52	Australia A	2026 men's rugby union internationals		

=== Lacrosse ===
The Premier Lacrosse League held five matches over the course of two weekends at Red Bull Arena in 2019. Three regular season matches were held on June 8 and 9, 2019, and drew a total of 10,773 fans. Two second round playoff matches were held on September 14, 2019, and drew a total of 10,572 fans, which was the highest single day total attendance for the PLL. This was the first time that Red Bull Arena hosted lacrosse matches.

=== American football ===
On September 2, 2023, Red Bull Arena hosted the inaugural "Brick City HBCU Kickoff Classic" between Grambling State University and Hampton University with Hampton University defeating Grambling State 35–31. This was the Arena's first American football game.

=== Concerts ===
Red Bull Arena hosted its first-ever concert, with Dispatch on June 18, 2011. Following the concert the stadium was highly praised by the sold-out crowd and media for its sight-lines, sound, and acoustics.

On October 10, 2016, Red Bull Arena announced plans to regularly host concerts and live entertainment events beginning in 2017.

On September 24, 2017, as part of the festivities for the Danone Nations Cup World Final, DNCE closed out the tournament with a concert.

The stadium hosted a concert by Rüfüs Du Sol on July 25, 2025. Later that year, as part of the Sports Illustrated Stadium Concert Series, Jason Aldean performed on October 10 and on October 11, Ludacris performed with Fat Joe, Rick Ross, Ashanti and Flo Rida.

=== Community ===
Covenant House – New Jersey, in conjunction with Horizon Blue Cross Blue Shield of New Jersey and the New York Red Bulls, have staged two "Sleep Outs" at Red Bull Arena in order to raise awareness and funds for New Jersey's homeless youth. The first was on October 17, 2014, and the second was on October 16, 2015.

On April 10, 2016, Red Bull Arena hosted thousands of Peruvian Americans from New Jersey and Pennsylvania to vote in the 2016 Peruvian general election. Citizens of Peru are entitled to vote in Peru's national elections regardless of where they reside.

On January 24, 2021, a drive-through COVID-19 testing site, with the capacity to test 2,400 people a day, opened in front of Red Bull Arena.

On May 26, 2022, Hudson County Community College (HCCC) held the commencement ceremonies for the classes of 2020, 2021 and 2022. The ceremonies were the first held for the school since 2019 due to the COVID-19 pandemic. HCCC has continued to host their commencement ceremonies at the Arena in 2023 and 2024.

=== Auto shows ===
On October 24, 2021, RIX Magazine hosted the Allstar Fitment 3.0 auto show at Red Bull Arena.

On November 20, 2022, the EuroKult Thanks-4-Giving Car Meet and Food Drive was held at the Arena.

On May 25, 2024, the Built Not Bought 2024 Car Show was held at the Arena.

== Awards and recognition ==
In December 2010, the stadium was named "Project of the Year (Sports/Recreation)" by Engineering News-Record – New York.

In January 2016, Red Bull Arena was awarded Major League Soccer – "Security Staff of the Year" for 2015. The security staff was particularly recognized for its security plan for the Major League Soccer Eastern Conference Final during a heightened state of security worldwide following the November 2015 Paris attacks.

In August 2016, Red Bull Arena was awarded the first annual J.D. Power – "Best In Fan Experience" for 2016. The stadium was selected from all the pro sports and entertainment venues in the New York metropolitan area. Red Bull Arena scored highest for overall satisfaction, security and ushers, seating area and game experience, ticket purchase, food and beverage, and leaving the game.

Also in August 2016, Red Bull Arena and the Red Bull Training Facility were awarded the Sports Turf Managers Association's (STMA) Certification for Environmentally Responsible Management. The training facility is the first facility to earn the 80% or higher ratings on the 10-part written assessment.

In August 2017, Red Bull Arena and the Red Bulls were awarded their second consecutive J.D. Power – "Best in Fan Experience" award for the New York metropolitan area. The stadium scored highest for ticket purchase, security and ushers, seating area and game experience, food and beverage and game arrival.

In November 2018, Red Bull Arena and Director of Grounds, Dan Shemesh, were honored with the "Field of the Year" award by the Sports Turf Managers Association (STMA) for the professional soccer division.

In April 2021, Red Bull Arena received Global Biorisk Advisory Council (GBAC) STAR accreditation ahead of the 2021 home opener. GBAC STAR is recognized as the gold standard of safe venues and provides third-party validation to ensure the implementation of rigorous protocols in response to biorisk situations such as COVID-19. Upgrades made to receive the accreditation include an ionized air filtration system, making all restrooms contactless, quarterly antimicrobial treatments, and implementing contact free food order and payment systems.

In November 2021, Red Bull Arena was named "2021 Professional Soccer Field of the Year" by the Sports Turf Managers Association (STMA). It is the second time Red Bull Arena was awarded this honor.

== Accessibility and transportation ==
The stadium can be reached via the Harrison station by the Newark-World Trade Center train of the PATH rapid transit system. A $256 million reconstruction and expansion, to accommodate the economic growth and development in the area and the increasing number of fans taking the PATH on game days, was completed on June 15, 2019. The stadium is accessible from Newark Penn Station by transferring to the PATH system and traveling one stop to Harrison. The stadium is also served by the 40 New Jersey Transit Bus route.

Bicycle parking is available near the stadium at the Harrison PATH station plazas with dozens of outdoor bicycle racks and two secure enclosed bicycle storage facilities provide by Oonee that can hold eight bicycles each.

The nearby Jackson Street Bridge crosses the Passaic River to the Ironbound neighborhood in Newark and is a popular pedestrian route to and from the stadium. In 2022, a soccer and Red Bulls themed mural was installed at the corner of Market Street and the Jackson Street Bridge. The mural, titled Unity Goal, was painted by Newark artist Diegumberrto who said "Soccer is a sport that unifies people of all ethnic backgrounds, cultures, and languages. The mural embodies the love of the game and adds a level of excitement as people gather to walk across the bridge to (Red Bull Arena)."

Sports Illustrated Stadium is accessible by car via I-280, with connections to the New Jersey Turnpike (I-95), Garden State Parkway, McCarter Highway (NJ-21), and other highways and roads. There are several designated lots and the Harrison Parking Center garage available for parking in the immediate vicinity.

Events and tenants
Preceded by Giants Stadium	Home of the New York Red Bulls; 2010–present	Succeeded by current
Preceded by Yurcak Field	Home of Gotham FC; 2020–present	Succeeded by current
