= Global Health Security Agenda =

- Abbreviation: GHSA
- Formation: February 2014
- Members: 69 countries, and international and non-government organizations, and private sector companies
- Website: globalhealthsecurityagenda.org

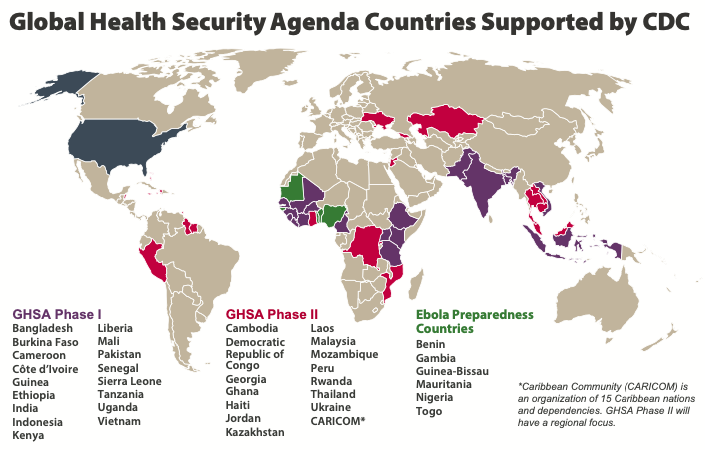
Global Health Security Agenda Countries Supported by CDC as of 15 December 2017

The Global Health Security Agenda (GHSA) is an international effort operating in the field of infection prevention and control. A brainchild of the Centers for Disease Control and Prevention (CDC), it was launched in February 2014 by a group of 44 countries and organizations including WHO. It was launched in 2014 as a five-year multilateral effort with the purpose to accelerate the implementation of the International Health Regulations (2005), particularly in developing countries. In 2017, GHSA was expanded to include non-state actors. It was also extended through 2024 with the release of the Global Health Security Agenda (GHSA) 2024 Framework (called "GHSA 2024"). The latter has the purpose to reach a standardized level of capacity to combat infectious diseases.

More than 70% of the world remains underprepared to prevent, detect, and respond to a public health emergency. Through GHSA, the CDC works with countries to strengthen public health systems and contain outbreaks at the source, before they spread into regional epidemics or global pandemics. Public health threats, health emergencies, and infectious diseases do not recognize or respect borders. Effective and functional public health systems in all countries reduce the risk and opportunity for health threats to affect the US.

CDC leadership and expertise have been instrumental in focusing a multisectoral and multinational coalition across 11 technical areas known as GHSA Action Packages that build core public health capacities in partner countries. CDC's focus on GHSA Action Packages such as disease surveillance, laboratory systems, workforce development, and emergency management have already resulted in measurable progress. CDC's global work protects Americans both at home and abroad and ensures that health threats do not reach US borders. Under the GHSA, the taxpayer is committed to partner with: 17 Phase I countries that receive financial support and technical assistance from CDC; 14 Phase II countries that receive only technical assistance from CDC.

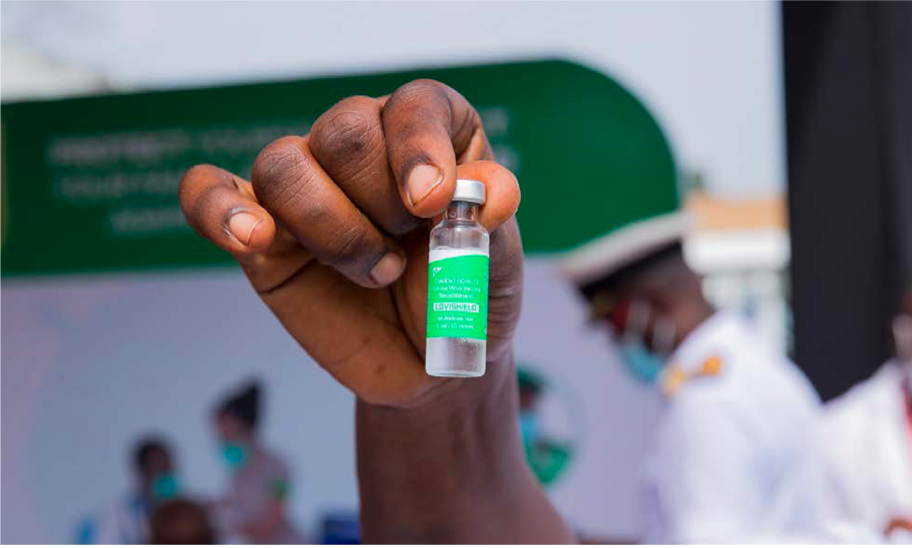
First vial of COVID-19 vaccine administered in Ghana courtesy of USAID

== Organization ==
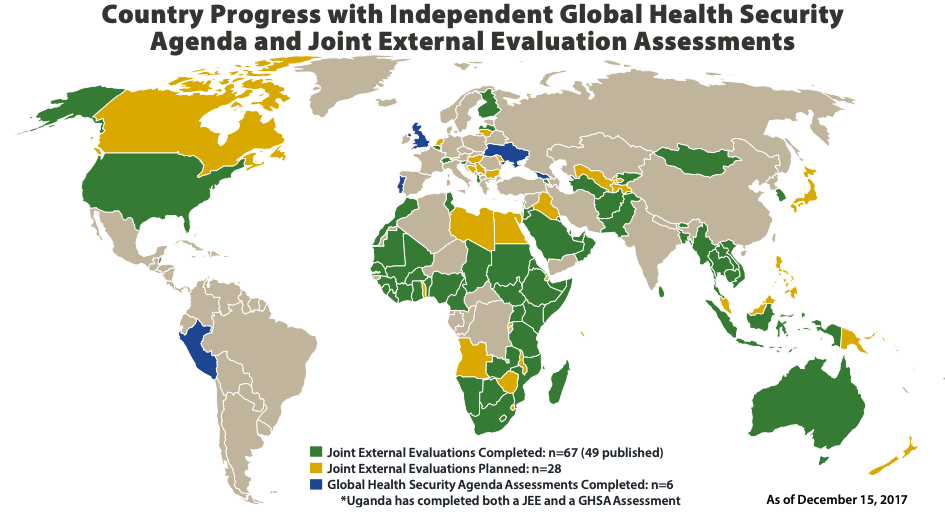
Country Progress with Independent Global Health Security Agenda and Joint External Evaluation Assessments as of 15 December 2017

A Steering Group is responsible for the governance of the GHSA. In the period from 2019 to 2023, the Steering Group has ten permanent members, including Indonesia, Italy, Kenya, Kingdom of Saudi Arabia, Republic of Korea, Senegal, Thailand, United States, the Global Health Security Agenda Consortium, Private Sector Round Table (PSRT). Additionally, the Steering Group currently has six rotating members, including Argentina, Australia, Canada, Finland, Netherlands, World Bank.

=== Global Health Security Agenda Consortium ===
The GHSA Consortium is a group of contributors to the Global Health Security Agenda. As of August 2022, notable members of the Consortium include:

- Aga Khan University
- Amazon Web Services
- American Association for Laboratory Animal Science
- American Public Health Association
- Association of Public Health Laboratories
- BD
- Bill & Melinda Gates Foundation
- Biotechnology Innovation Organization
- Boston University
- CDC Foundation
- Center for Naval Analysis
- Center for Strategic and International Studies
- Columbia University
- Consortium of Universities for Global Health
- Council of State and Territorial Epidemiologists
- CRDF Global
- Dartmouth College
- Drexel University
- EcoHealth Alliance
- Emergent BioSolutions
- Esri
- FHI 360
- Galveston National Laboratory
- General Electric
- Geneva Centre for Security Policy
- George Mason University
- Georgetown University
- Georgia Institute of Technology
- Global Biorisk Advisory Council
- Global Health Council
- Global Virus Network
- Green Cross International
- Henry Schein
- Howard University
- Infectious Diseases Society of America
- International Medical Corps
- International Rescue Committee
- Jane Goodall Institute
- Jhpiego
- Johns Hopkins Center for Health Security
- Johns Hopkins University
- JSI Research & Training Institute
- Lady Reading Hospital Medical Training Institute
- Management Sciences for Health
- Massey University
- McGill University
- Medical College of Georgia
- MRI Global
- National Association of County and City Health Officials
- National Academies of Sciences, Engineering, and Medicine
- National Academy of Sciences
- National Emerging Infectious Diseases Laboratories
- National Institute of Health (Pakistan)
- Nuclear Threat Initiative
- Palladium International
- PATH
- Project HOPE
- Program for Monitoring Emerging Diseases
- RAND Corporation
- Rostropovich-Vishnevskaya Foundation
- RTI International
- Save the Children
- Smithsonian Institution
- Tableau Foundation
- Texas A&M University
- University of Minnesota
