= Jason Emery =

New Zealand rugby union player

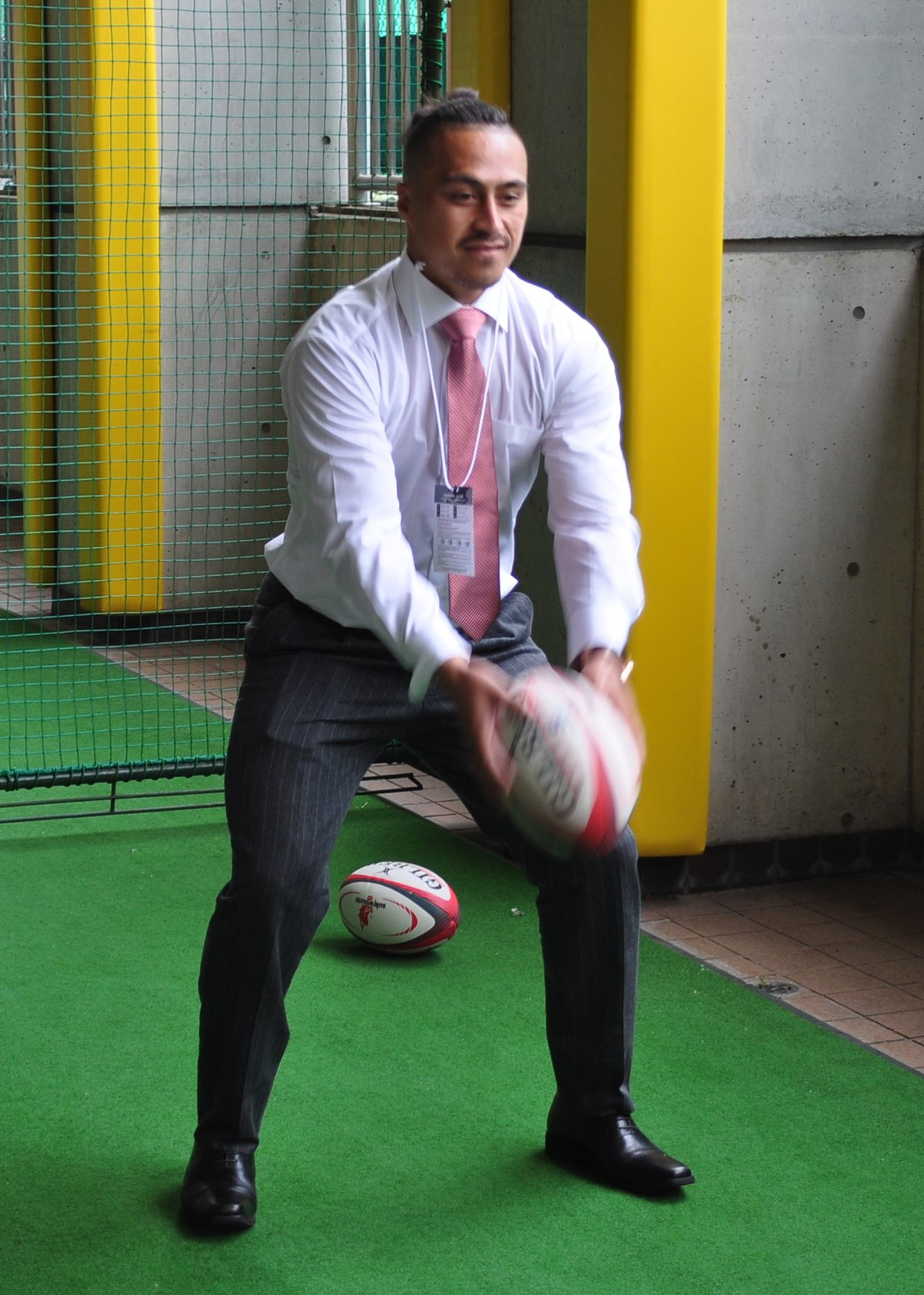
- Born: 21 September 1993 (age 33) Tauranga, New Zealand
- Height: 1.76 m (5 ft 9 1/2 in)
- Weight: 92 kg (14 st 7 lb)
- School: Palmerston North Boys' High School
- University: Massey University

Rugby union career
- Position(s): Centre, Fullback
Senior career
Years	Team	Apps	(Points)
2018–2021	Munakata Sanix Blues	23	(35)
2022-2023	New York	33	(125)
2024	Los Angeles	10	(17)
Provincial / State sides
Years	Team	Apps	(Points)
2012-2017, 2021-2024	Manawatu	87	(74)
- Correct as of 30 December 2024
Super Rugby
Years	Team	Apps	(Points)
2013–2017	Highlanders	35	(10)
2018–2019	Sunwolves	22	(10)
- Correct as of 21 February 2021
International career
Years	Team	Apps	(Points)
2012	New Zealand under-20	4	(15)
2014	Māori All Blacks	2	(10)
- Correct as of 2 March 2019

Jason Emery (born 21 September 1993) is a New Zealand rugby union player who represents the Sunwolves in Super Rugby, as well as for Manawatu in the Mitre 10 Cup. He also plays for Rugby New York (Ironworkers) in Major League Rugby (MLR) in the United States. His position of choice is centre.

He is married to Tori Ratima and is a father of three daughters, Aria, Maddie and Riley.

== Early life and schooling ==
Born in Tauranga, Emery moved south to Wellington before ending up in Palmerston North at the age of 13. While attending Palmerston North Boys' High School, Emery made the school's 1st XV as a centre as a year 11 student in 2009, competing in the Super 8 schools competition.

In 2010, Emery made the New Zealand Schools team. He scored a try in the annual trans-Tasman 'Test' against the Australia Schoolboys, played in Littlebourne. The match was won by New Zealand 30–21. The team had previously played Tonga Schools and Otago U19 two weeks earlier.

The following year Emery, while in his final year at school, played for New Zealand schools against Australia, at Knox Grammar School in Sydney. New Zealand lost 19–26, with fellow midfielder, who was also from PNBHS, Ngani Laumape scoring New Zealand's only try.

== Playing career ==
While still at school, Emery was signed by the Manawatu Rugby Union, but didn't make his provincial debut until 24 August 2012. Before that, he went to South Africa to compete at the Junior Rugby World Cup with the New Zealand U20 team, coming in 2nd place. He made his debut at the age of 18, against the Wellington Lions in the National Provincial Championship. He came on as a substitute in the final 30 minutes. He went on to help create the only try by Manawatu in the 11–30 loss at Central Energy Trust Arena in Palmerston North. He scored his first try for his province in a 33–20 win over Northland in a Championship match. It was also Emery's first start for his province.

In October 2012 Emery signed a three-year contract with the Highlanders, starting in the 2013 Super Rugby season. He made his debut in the 19–23 loss to the Hurricanes at Forsyth Barr Stadium in Dunedin on 15 March 2013.

On 22 April 2016, in his first start during the 2016 Super Rugby season for the Highlanders against the Sharks, within the first 15 minutes Emery was involved in a mid-air collision with opposing fullback Willie le Roux. This resulted in le Roux falling dangerously on his back. Because of his actions Emery was red carded and banned from playing for 4 weeks.
