= Marty Veale =

Former rugby union player/current coach

- Born: 9 August 1977 (age 49) New Zealand
- Height: 1.95 m (6 ft 5 in)
- Weight: 112 kg (17 st 9 lb)

Rugby union career
- Position: Lock
- –: Northland
Senior career
Years	Team	Apps	(Points)
2006–2008	Kubota Spears		
2009–2011	London Wasps	33	(0)
Provincial / State sides
Years	Team	Apps	(Points)
2004–2005	North Harbour		
Coaching career
- Years: Team
- Old Blue RFC (Head Coach)
- 2015–2018: West Point (Forwards Coach)
- 2016–2017: United States national rugby union team (Set Piece Coach)
- 2019: Sunwolves (Scrum Coach)
- 2019–2021: Rugby New York (Forwards Coach)
- 2021–: Rugby New York (Head Coach)

Marty Veale (born 9 August 1977) is a former rugby union player and is assistant coach with Northland in the Bunnings NPC. He played at lock for Northland in the ITM Cup competition. He formerly coached rugby as Head Coach of Rugby New York (RNY), a member of Major League Rugby (MLR)Old Blue R.F.C. in New York and the United States Military Academy at West Point men's team starting in 2015.

== Playing career ==
Veale was born in New Zealand, and was descended from William Veale who had emigrated from Ireland and was one of a well known Waterford seafaring family. Veale enjoyed a nomad existence as a player, turning out for sides in his native New Zealand, Japan and America. Before signing for Wasps in February 2009, Veale had most recently spent a season with Northland in the Air New Zealand Cup.

He signed a two-year deal at the end of the year to keep him at Wasps until the end of the 2010–11 season. At the conclusion of his time with Wasps, he returned to New Zealand, signing with Northland for the 2011 ITM Cup.

== Coaching career ==
Following his retirement as a player, Veale signed on as head coach for Old Blue Rugby Football Club, a United States Rugby Super League team and member of the USA Rugby Union. In 2015 Veale began coaching the men's forwards at the United States Military Academy at West Point, New York.

He was appointed as an assistant coach for the USA Eagles under John Mitchell in 2016. During his time with the national side they won the 2017 Americas Rugby Championship and qualified for the 2019 Rugby World Cup as Americas 1. He left his position in June 2017.

Veale then joined the Sunwolves as scrum coach for the 2019 Super Rugby season. He left the Sunwolves following the conclusion of the season and consulted for the Munakata Sanix Blues in Japan.

He was appointed as forwards coach for Rugby New York in November 2019. Veale was then named as head coach for the 2021 season following the departure of Greg McWilliams. He led Rugby New York to their first MLR Championship during the 2022 season.
