= Global Biorisk Advisory Council =

American risk accreditation company

Global Biorisk Advisory Council, a Division of ISSA
- Type: Council
- Headquarters: Northbrook, Illinois, U.S.
- Location: United States
- Website: https://gbac.issa.com

The Global Biorisk Advisory Council (GAC), a Division of ISSA, is a network of international leaders in the field of microbial-pathogenic threat analysis, mitigation and response and recovery. GAC provides services intended to assist individuals, institutions, companies and governments in assessing preparedness. It also offers education and training to respond and recover in critical biohazardous events, with an emphasis on microbial containment and psychological surety.

== History ==
GBAC started from a conversation among professionals in biosafety, infection control, forensic restoration and bio-decontamination and cleaning, in which they identified gaps within those industries that could be closed through collaboration.

In 2019, GBAC merged with ISSA, the Worldwide Cleaning Industry Association. Patricia Olinger serves as GBAC’s Executive Director. Olinger is a Registered Biosafety Professional, a Certified Forensic Operator and Certified Bio-Forensic Restoration Specialist, and has held board and committee leadership positions with US Centers for Disease Control and Prevention (CDC), the International Organization for Standardization (ISO), the US National Institutes of Health (NIH), the American Biological Safety Association and the Campus Safety Health and Environmental Management Association.

Dr. Gavin Macgregor-Skinner, an emergency management and infectious disease expert, serves as GBAC’s Director and Jeff Jones is the Director of Forensic Restoration. GBAC’s Scientific Advisory Board is composed of industry professionals.

In May 2020, GBAC introduced the GBAC STAR facility accreditation program on cleaning, disinfection and infectious disease prevention.

== GBAC STAR Accreditation ==
GBAC STAR establishes requirements to assist facilities with work practices, protocols, procedures and systems to control risks associated with infectious agents, such as SARS-CoV-2, the virus responsible for coronavirus disease 2019 or COVID-19. It provides third-party validation to ensure the implementation of protocols across 20 program elements with specific performance and guidance criteria.

Organizations that have committed to achieve or have earned GBAC STAR accreditation include:

- American Airlines
- Chase Center in San Francisco
- The Dubai Mall in Dubai, United Arab Emirates
- Georgia World Congress Center in Atlanta
- Hard Rock Stadium in Miami, the home stadium of the Miami Dolphins of the National Football League (NFL)
- Hyatt Hotels
- Hobby Center for the Performing Arts in Houston, Texas
- Orange County Convention Center
- Overland Park Convention Center in Overland Park, Kansas
- Red Bull Arena in Harrison, New Jersey
- STAPLES Center in Downtown Los Angeles
