= Rugby New York =

Professional rugby union team from New York City

- Nickname(s): Ironworkers; Roosters (former)
- Founded: 2018; 8 years ago
- Disbanded: 2023; 3 years ago
- Location: New York City, New York
- Ground(s): Mount Vernon Memorial Field, Mount Vernon, New York (Capacity: 3,900)
- Chairman: Guy Bolton
- Most caps: Dylan Fawsitt (72)
- Top scorer: Dylan Fawsitt (205)
- Most tries: Dylan Fawsitt (41)
- League: Major League Rugby
- 2023: Eastern Conference: 2nd Playoffs: Conference semi-finalist
1st kit	2nd kit

Official website
- rugbynewyork.com

Rugby New York, originally known as Rugby United New York and officially nicknamed the Ironworkers, was a professional rugby union team based in New York City that was a member of Major League Rugby (MLR). The team played an exhibition season in spring 2018 and joined MLR for its second full season in 2019. The team was founded by James Kennedy.

During the 2022 season, its first under the Rugby New York name, the team made its only MLR Final appearance, winning a title in front of 1,979 attendees at Red Bull Arena in nearby Harrison, New Jersey.

In December 2023, MLR announced that Rugby New York had withdrawn from the league and had folded, following a failed attempt to sell the team.

== History ==
Rugby United New York was founded in April 2018 by James Kennedy, owner of Murphy Kennedy Group a New York construction management company and John Layfield, a retired WWE professional wrestler and the founder of a nonprofit organization called Beyond Rugby Bermuda. In its 2018 exhibition season, RUNY was led by former USA men's national team coach Mike Tolkin, and assistant coaches Bruce McLane (former coach of New York Athletic Club RFC), Andrew Britt, and Vili Vakasisikakala. The team's 2018 spring season consisted of matches against the Ontario Arrows and the Mystic River Rugby Club of Boston. The team played its home matches at Gaelic Park in The Bronx. The team played its first match on March 17, 2018, at Mazzella Field in New Rochelle, New York. New York defeated the Ontario Arrows by a score of 36–19. RUNY played its first match in New York City against Mystic River on March 24 before a sold-out crowd at Gaelic Park. New York defeated Mystic River by a score of 50–0.

Ahead of the 2019 season, RUNY announced that they had retained Mike Tolkin as the team's head coach, signed Kees Lensing as the team's forwards coach, and named James English as general manager. Tiffany Faʻaeʻe was signed as Assistant Coach.

On November 7, 2018, RUNY announced that MCU Park in Brooklyn would be their home field for their first full season.

On April 12, 2021, the club announced that they would begin the season at Cochrane Stadium in Jersey City, NJ. The club would end up splitting their home fields between Cochrane Stadium and Belson Stadium in Queens, NY.

In January 2023, Rugby New York announced that Memorial Field in Mount Vernon, NY would be their home field.

On December 6, 2023, it was announced that the Iron Workers would not compete in the 2024 MLR season.

== Broadcasts ==
2019 and 2020 home games were shown on SportsNet New York (SNY). Matt McCarthy, John Broker and Steve Lewis were the on air talent.

The 2021 season matches were broadcast on MSG Networks, ending their contract with SNY.

== Sponsorship ==
During the inaugural season, RUNY signed a partnership deal with Magners Irish Cider, the official drink partner and Bawnmore Irish Beef Jerky as the official snack partner for the 2019 season. They also partnered up with EVF Performance, the team's official gym and Motion PT Group, named the official physical therapy partner for the team.

For the 2021 season, RUNY partnered with Sword Performance, a sports drink hydration company. They also partnered with Mainfreight as their shirt sponsor for the next two seasons.

Season	Kit manufacturer	Shirt sponsor
2018	Paladin Sports	Murphy Kennedy Group
2019	XBlades	Murphy Kennedy Group
2020	Paladin Sports	None
2021	Paladin Sports	Mainfreight
2022	Paladin Sports	Mainfreight
2023	Paladin Sports	Hudson Pro Orthopedics & Sports Medicine

=== Head coaches ===
- (United States) Mike Tolkin (2018–2019)
- (Ireland) Greg McWilliams (2020)
- (New Zealand) Marty Veale (2021–2022)
- (New Zealand) James Semple (2022–2023)

=== Captains ===
- Mike Petri (2019)
- Dylan Fawsitt (2020–2021)
- Nate Brakeley (2022–2023)

== Records ==
=== Season standings ===
Season	Conference	Regular season										Postseason						
Season	Conference	Pos	Pld	W	D	L	F	A	+/−	BP	Pts	Pld	W	L	F	A	+/−	Result
2019	-	4th	16	11	0	5	411	320	+91	10	54	1	0	1	22	24	-2	Lost Semifinal (San Diego Legion) 22–24
2020 (Note: 2020 regular season shortened and playoffs cancelled due to the COVID-19 pandemic.)	Eastern	4th	5	3	0	2	136	131	+5	3	15	-	-	-	-	-	-	Cancelled
2021	Eastern	2nd	16	10	0	6	448	419	+29	13	53	1	0	1	9	10	-1	Lost East Conference Final (Rugby ATL) 9-10
2022	Eastern	3rd	16	11	0	5	433	408	+25	11	56	3	3	0	80	50	+30	Won East Conference Eliminator (Rugby ATL) 26–19; Won East Conference Final (New England Free Jacks) 24–16; Won Major League Rugby final (Seattle Seawolves) 30-15
2023	-	4th	16	8	0	8	442	373	+69	10	43	1	0	1	37	23	-4	Lost East Eliminator (Old Glory DC) 37-33
Totals			69	43	0	26	1,870	1,651	+219	37	178	6	3	3	148	117	+31	4 postseason appearances

=== Honors ===
Major League Rugby
Playoff Appearances	Conference Championships	Major League Rugby Championships
2019, 2021, 2022, 2023	2022	2022

=== Head to Head ===
Details of the performance of Rugby United New York against Major League Rugby opponents, between the 2019 and 2022 seasons. Table includes all regular season and play-off matches.

Major League Rugby
Opposition	Span	Played	Won	Drawn	Lost	Win%	PF	PA	PD	Home Wins	Away Wins	Notes
San Diego Legion	2019–22	6	3	0	3	50	148	152	-4	1	2	
NOLA Gold	2019–22	6	4	0	2	66.67	177	179	-2	2	2	
Seattle Seawolves	2019–22	5	3	0	2	60	135	129	+6	2	1	
Houston SaberCats	2019–22	5	5	0	0	100	151	57	+94	2	3	
Utah Warriors	2019–21	3	2	0	1	66.67	99	72	+28	1	1	
Toronto Arrows	2019–22	6	3	0	3	50	138	151	-13	1	2	
Austin Gilgronis	2019–20	4	3	0	1	75	104	65	+39	2	1	
New England Free Jacks	2020-22	7	3	0	4	42.86	149	172	-23	1	2	
Rugby ATL	2020–22	7	5	0	2	71.43	154	158	-4	2	3	
Old Glory DC	2021-22	4	4	0	0	100	178	124	+54	2	2	
LA Giltinis	2021-22	2	1	0	1	50	18	59	-41	1	0	
Dallas Jackals	2022	1	1	0	0	100	41	5	+36	0	1	
Glendale Raptors	2019–20	2	1	0	1	50	47	39	+8	1	0	
Totals	2019–22	58	38	0	20	65.55	1,539	1,362	+177	18	20	

== 2018 season ==
All games in the 2018 season were exhibition games and did not count in the league standings.

Date	Opponent	Home/Away	Venue	Location	Result
March 17	Ontario Arrows	Home	Mazzella Field	New Rochelle, New York	Won, 36–19
March 24	Mystic River Rugby Club	Home	Gaelic Park	Riverdale, Bronx, New York	Won, 50–0
March 31	Mystic River Rugby Club	Away	Mignone Field	Allston, Massachusetts	Won, 42–24
April 14	Ontario Arrows	Away	York Lions Stadium	Toronto, Ontario	Game cancelled due to weather

== 2019 season ==
=== Exhibitions ===
Date	Opponent	Home/Away	Location	Result
December 1, 2018	New England Free Jacks	Away	Union Point Sports Complex	Won, 38–35
December 15, 2018	Capital Selects	Home	Mazzella Field	Won, 100–0
January 12, 2019	Toronto Arrows	Neutral	Buffalo Bills Fieldhouse	Cancelled

=== Regular season ===
Date	Opponent	Home/Away	Location	Result
January 27	San Diego Legion	Away	Torero Stadium	Won, 25-23
February 16	New Orleans Gold	Away	Archbishop Shaw	Won, 27–24
February 24	Seattle Seawolves	Away	Starfire Stadium	Lost, 21-33
March 2	Houston SaberCats	Away	Constellation Field	Won, 35-8
March 9	Utah Warriors	Away	Zions Bank Stadium	Won, 47-21
March 15	Toronto Arrows	Home	MCU Park	Won, 24–21
March 24	Glendale Raptors	Home	MCU Park	Won, 31-19
March 30	Austin Elite	Away	Toyota Field	Won, 19-11
April 14	San Diego Legion	Home	MCU Park	Lost, 19–29
April 20	Utah Warriors	Home	MCU Park	Won, 24–22
April 26	Glendale Raptors	Away	Infinity Park	Lost, 16–20
May 5	Houston SaberCats	Home	MCU Park	Won, 21–0
May 12	Seattle Seawolves	Home	MCU Park	Lost, 31–38
May 19	Austin Elite	Home	MCU Park	Won, 27-7
May 26	New Orleans Gold	Home	MCU Park	Won, 24–22
June 2	Toronto Arrows	Away	Lamport Stadium	Lost, 20-22

=== Postseason ===
Date	Opponent	Home/Away	Result
June 9	San Diego Legion	Away	Lost, 22-24

== 2020 season ==
=== Exhibition ===
Date	Opponent	Home/Away	Location	Result
January 25	Toronto Arrows	Neutral	Orchard Park	scrimmage no score recorded
February 1	New York Barbarians	Home	Wagner College Football Stadium	Won 77-5

=== Regular season ===
On March 12, 2020, MLR announced the season would go on hiatus immediately for 30 days due to fears surrounding the 2019–2020 coronavirus pandemic. It was cancelled the following week

Date	Opponent	Home/Away	Location	Result
February 8	New England Free Jacks	Away	Sam Boyd Stadium	Lost 14-34
February 15	Austin Gilgronis	Home	Sam Boyd Stadium	Won 49-31
February 23	Rugby ATL	Away	Lupo Family Field @ Life University	Won 22-19
March 1	Houston SaberCats	Away	Aveva Stadium	Won 31-23
March 8	San Diego Legion	Away	Torero Stadium	Lost 20-24
March 14	Seattle Seawolves	Home	MCU Park	Cancelled
March 22	Toronto Arrows	Home	MCU Park	Cancelled
March 29	Old Glory DC	Away	Cardinal Stadium @ Catholic University	Cancelled
April 10	Rugby ATL	Home	MCU Park	Cancelled
April 18	NOLA Gold	Away	The Gold Mine	Cancelled
April 25	Colorado Raptors	Home	MCU Park	Cancelled
May 1	New England Free Jacks	Home	MCU Park	Cancelled
May 9	Old Glory DC	Home	MCU Park	Cancelled
May 16	Utah Warriors	Away	Zions Bank Stadium	Cancelled
May 22	Toronto Arrows	Away	Lamport Stadium	Cancelled
May 30	NOLA Gold	Home	MCU Park	Cancelled

== 2021 season ==
=== Regular season ===
Date	Opponent	Home/Away	Location	Result
March 20	San Diego Legion	Away	James Regional Sports Park	Won, 36–29
March 27	New Orleans Gold	Away	The Gold Mine	Lost, 28–51
April 11	Rugby ATL	Away	Lupo Family Field	Won, 27–17
April 18	Old Glory DC	Home	Cochrane Stadium	Won, 38–34
April 25	Toronto Arrows	Home	Cochrane Stadium	Lost, 12–53
May 2	Seattle Seawolves	Away	Starfire Stadium	Won, 23–21
May 8	LA Giltinis	Home	Cochrane Stadium	Won, 18–16
May 15	Austin Gilgronis	Away	Bold Stadium	Lost, 9–16
May 23	New England Free Jacks	Home	Cochrane Stadium	Won, 29–19
May 30	Old Glory DC	Away	Segra Field	Won, 46–10
June 13	Rugby ATL	Home	Belson Stadium	Won, 31–24
June 19	Utah Warriors	Home	Cochrane Stadium	Lost, 28–29
June 27	Toronto Arrows	Away	Lupo Family Field	Won, 31–24
July 3	New England Free Jacks	Away	Union Point Sports Complex	Lost, 6–22
July 10	Houston SaberCats	Home	Belson Stadium	Won, 54–19
July 17	New Orleans Gold	Home	Belson Stadium	Lost, 32–35

=== Post-season ===
Date	Opponent	Home/Away	Result	
July 24	Rugby ATL	Away	Lupo Family Field	Lost, 9-10

== 2022 season ==
=== Regular season ===
Date	Opponent	Home/Away	Location	Result
February 12	Houston SaberCats	Away	Aveva Stadium	Won, 10-7
February 19	Rugby ATL	Away	Silverbacks Park	Won, 36-31
February 26	Dallas Jackals	Away	Choctaw Stadium	Won, 41-5
March 6	New England Free Jacks	Home	John F. Kennedy Stadium	Lost, 29-38
March 13	San Diego Legion	Home	John F. Kennedy Stadium	Won, 26-23
March 19	New Orleans Gold	Away	The Gold Mine	Won, 30-19
March 27	Toronto Arrows	Home	John F. Kennedy Stadium	Lost, 10-14
April 3	Old Glory DC	Home	John F. Kennedy Stadium	Won, 35-31
April 10	LA Giltinis	Away	Los Angeles Memorial Coliseum	Lost, 43-0
April 24	New England Free Jacks	Home	John F. Kennedy Stadium	Lost, 26-29
May 1	New Orleans Gold	Home	John F. Kennedy Stadium	Won, 36-28
May 8	Toronto Arrows	Away	York Lions Stadium	Won, 41-17
May 15	Seattle Seawolves	Home	John F. Kennedy Stadium	Won, 30-22
May 22	Rugby ATL	Home	John F. Kennedy Stadium	Lost, 3-38
May 29	Old Glory DC	Away	Segra Field	Won, 59-49
June 3	New England Free Jacks	Away	Veterans Memorial Stadium	Won, 21-14

=== Post-season ===
Round	Date	Opponent	Home/Away	Location	Result
East Eliminator	June 11	Rugby ATL	Away	Silverbacks Park	Won, 26-19
East Conference Finals	June 19	New England Free Jacks	Away	Veterans Memorial Stadium	Won, 24-19
MLR Championship	June 25	Seattle Seawolves	Home	Red Bull Arena	Won, 30-15

== 2023 season ==
=== Regular season ===
Date	Opponent	Home/Away	Location	Result
February 18	Seattle Seawolves	Away	Starfire Sports Complex	Lost, 11-25
February 26	Toronto Arrows	Home	Memorial Field	Won, 39-3
March 5	Old Glory DC	Home	Memorial Field	Won, 34-8
March 12	NOLA Gold	Away	Gold Mine on Airline	Lost, 31-5
March 19	New England Free Jacks	Home	Memorial Field	Lost, 33-18
April 2	Rugby ATL	Home	Memorial Field	Won, 31-20
April 8	Toronto Arrows	Away	York Lions Stadium	Won, 29-27
April 16	Old Glory DC	Away	Segra Field	Lost, 42-31
April 23	Houston SaberCats	Home	Memorial Field	Lost, 34-27
April 30	New England Free Jacks	Away	Veterans Memorial Stadium	Lost, 8-0
May 7	NOLA Gold	Home	Memorial Field	Won, 54-19
May 14	Chicago Hounds	Away	SeatGeek Stadium	Won, 21-20
May 28	San Diego Legion	Away	Snapdragon Stadium	Lost, 36-13
June 4	Dallas Jackals	Home	Memorial Field	Won, 43-14
June 10	Rugby ATL	Away	Silverbacks Park	Won, 39-24
June 18	Utah Warriors	Home	Memorial Field	Lost, 43-33

=== Post-season ===
Round	Date	Opponent	Home/Away	Location	Result
East Eliminator	June 25	Old Glory DC	Home	Memorial Field	Lost, 37-33
